= Banque de commerce et de développement =

- Trade name: BCD
- Industry: Finance
- Founded: 14 January 1999
- Defunct: 23 March 2004
- Headquarters: Bujumbura, Burundi
- Owner: Government of Burundi

The Banque de commerce et de développement (Commerce and Development Bank), or BCD, was a short-lived state-owned bank in Burundi.

== History ==
The Banque de commerce et de développement (BCD) was created on 14 January 1999. It was a limited liability company with 1.016 billion BIF of capital, headed by a former prime minister of Burundi. Antoine Nduwayo, prime minister from February 1995 to July 1996, had been appointed director-general of the Caisse de Mobilization et de Financement (CAMOFI] after leaving office. CAMOFI collapsed in November 1998 with debts that were more than five times its equity. Nduwayo's appointment after leading CAMOFI into bankruptcy, which contravened the banking law, showed the weakness of the central bank in upholding the law against powerful politicians.

As with CAMOFI, BCD was very poorly managed. The central bank put BCD under receivership on 23 March 2004, after ignoring warning of serious problems for a long period. A later audit showed several cases of fraud, such as a load of 3.185 billion BIF to purchase land in the Quartier Buyenzi of Bujumbura. The amount was excessive for this poor neighborhood, and the purchase was never completed. By the time of its failure the bank could only continue operating if it could raise 7.5 billion BIF through recapitalization, loan recovery and sale of assets. This would be impossible given the bank's poor reputation.

On 1 July 2006, the 44th anniversary of Burundi's independence, the President of Burundi made a speech in which he asked the relevant Ministry to do everything to restore their rights to people who had deposits in BCD. He reassured all people in the interior of the country to whom the State owed money that this issue would soon be solved.

Three commercial banks dominated the banking system during this period, with 75% of deposits and credits. They were the Banque de Crédit de Bujumbura, formerly a subsidiary of Fortis Group, Banque Commerciale du Burundi, formerly a subsidiary of ING, and Interbank Burundi, 100% privately owned. The European shareholders sold their stakes in the first two to Burundian or African shareholders, and the State also held some of the shares. Newcomers were unable to compete with these banks. BCD was one of five financial institutions that collapsed in this period, the others being the Meridien Bank Burundi (MBB), Caisse d'épargne du Burundi (CADEBU), Caisse de mobilisation et de financement (CAMOFI) and Banque Populaire du Burundi (BPB).

== See also ==
- List of companies of Burundi
- Economy of Burundi

== Sources ==
- Discours du president de la republique a l'occasion du 44 ème anniversaire de l'independance du Burundi (PDF) (in French), 1 July 2006
- Girukwigomba, Astere (2010), Domestic Resources Mobilization in Sub-Saharan Africa: The Case of Burundi (PDF), Ottawa, Canada: North-South Institute
- Nkurunziza, Janvier D.; Ndikumana, Léonce; Nyamoya, Prime (June 2010), The Financial Sector in Burundi (PDF), NBER Africa Project
- Un apartheid qui ne dit pas son nom (PDF), Bujumbura: FRODEBU, August 1997
