= Société Pétroliere du Burundi =

Société Pétrolière du Burundi
- Trade name: SOPEBU
- Industry: Energy
- Founded: 20 February 2024; 2 years ago
- Headquarters: Bujumbura, Burundi
- Owner: Government of Burundi
- Parent: Ministry of Energy
- Website: https://sopebu.com/en

Société Pétrolière du Burundi (Burundi Petrol Company), or SOPEBU, is a public company that imports, stores and distributes petroleum products in Burundi.

== Background ==
A fuel crisis began in Burundi in 2023. The shortages were blamed by the NGO Olucome on lack of foreign currency to buy the fuel, the monopoly on imports and lack of a strategic reserve.

The Council of Ministers blamed the shortages on the absence of a public body able to centralize the country's supplies, and thus to better manage funds intended for fuel imports. The private companies importing fuel relied on the central bank for foreign currency, but did not always use all that was available. The government's first response was to entrust Regideso, the water and electricity company, with importation and distribution of fuel. However, Regideso was not prepared to take on this large effort.

== Foundation ==
SOPEBU was created in an attempt to end repeated fuel shortages. Presidential decree 100/034 of 20 February 2024 created the Société Pétroliere du Burundi (SOPEBU) a publicly owned company, under the Ministry of Energy. The company was to organize, coordinate and centralize Burundi's orders for oil products, establish a physical stock that would last at least three months, import oil and gas products and distribute oil products fairly to different parts of the country, among other duties.

Gabriel Rufyiri, President of Olucome, noted that the government had a record of poor management of publicly owned companies such as Cotebu, Verundi, Cadebu, ONAPHA, Otrabu and Air Burundi. The NGO PARCEM warned of the risk of giving a monopoly to a public company, including the risk of executives appointed for political reasons, and interference by public officials in management of the company. They also raised concerns about the fact that SOPEBU did not have the trucks, storage stations and other infrastructure.

People or companies that had invested in trucks and barges to transport fuel, and in storage and distribution infrastructure, would have to negotiate a deal with Sopebu or else sell out.

== Events ==
In March 2024 Rosine Guilene Gatoni, spokesperson for the president of the Republic of Burundi, said Sopebu would be responsible for monitoring the entire fuel supply process and its distribution to the population on a daily basis. She reassured companies and people working in the oil sectors that they would not be removed from the list of traders of oil products.

In a public broadcast in June 2024 the Minister of Energy and Mines said of the fuel shortage that the SOPEBU company was working to take over from the energy company REGIDESO, which had a heavy set of specifications. His ministry was also working to discourage speculators, so that fuel could be distributed better.

The chronic fuel shortage continued, and on 12 August 2024 Evariste Ndayishimiye, President of Burundi, announced that three fuel tankers were on their way. He blamed but did not name commission agents for embezzling dollars allocated to fuel purchase. The tankers had not arrived by the end of the month, and SOPEBU would not provide an explanation. Queueing in front of gas stations was forbidden, but many motorists were defying the ban.

Ibrahim Uwizeye, Minister of Hydraulics, Energy and Mines, announced that fuel distribution would be digitalized, starting on 3 September 2024 in Bujumbura Mairie and later in the provinces. SOPEBU would control the process using a census of all gas stations, buses and taxis. This would prevent illegal trafficking of fuel by vehicles that refuelled at multiple stations so they could store fuel.

Later in September SOPEBU announced that starting on 30 September 2024 all motorized vehicles would have to be registered in a database. Various registration sites had been set up in Bujumbura. Owners would have to bring their vehicle with their registration document and the technical inspection certificate. They could also register through a mobile application.

== See also ==
- List of companies of Burundi
- Economy of Burundi

== Sources ==
- "Bujumbura : La distribution du carburant sera digitalisee", Radio Peace FM (in French)
- "Burundi : Enregistrement obligatoire des véhicules pour une gestion numérique du carburant", Itara (in French), 30 September 2024
- Decret No100/034 du 20 fevrier 2024... (PDF) (in French), Burundi
- Kururu, Simon (22 May 2024), "ANALYSE: Carburant, un casse-tête", Iwacu (in French)
- La pénurie du carburant : La SOPEBU serait une solution?, PARCEM, 21 March 2024
- Maniragaba, Mélance (22 March 2024), "SOPEBU : est-ce une garantie !", Burundi Eco (in French)
- Manirakiza, Fabrice; Ntakirutimana, Pascal (31 August 2024), "Les 3 pétroliers annoncés se font toujours attendre", Iwacu (in French)
- Nkurunziza, Dieudonné (28 June 2024), Makamba: les membres du Gouvernement animent une émission publique (in French), Radio Télévision Nationale du Burundi
- "Province de Karusi : Emission publique animée par les porte-paroles des institutions", Le Renouveau (in French), 29 March 2024
