= Société d'Entreposage Pétrolier au Burundi =

- Trade name: SEP Burundi
- Industry: Energy
- Founded: 1967; 59 years ago
- Headquarters: Bujumbura, Burundi
- Global Port Services Burundi in Bujumbura (Burundi)

Société d'Entreposage Pétrolier au Burundi (Burundi Petroleum Storage Company: SEP Burundi), is a private company that operates a fuel storage depot near the Port of Bujumbura in Burundi. It was created in 1967 to supply petroleum products to Burundi, the Democratic Republic of the Congo and Rwanda.

== Location ==
SEP (Société d'entreposage de pétrole) operates oil storage facilities near the Port of Bujumbura. The north jetty of the harbor is 330 metres (1,080 ft) long, of which 150 metres (490 ft) is used as an oil terminal. The oil depot owned by SEP is about 1 kilometre (0.62 mi) to the north of the port. The depot is connected to the quay by an oil pipeline. SEP also owned an oil depot in Gitega.

== History ==
The Société d’Entreposage Pétrolier au Burundi (SEP-Burundi) was created in 1967 to enable supply of petroleum products to Burundi, the Democratic Republic of the Congo and Rwanda. As of 1982 petrol products were imported by five companies: Finam Mobil, Texaco, Shell and BP. These companies jointly owned SEP Burundi.

In 1983 and 1986 the Ntahangwa River flooded Bujumbura. Houses were destroyed in the Buyenzi quarter, and damage was done to the stocks of SEP, COGERCO, RAFINA and the Port of Bujumbura.

In August 2019 the Council of Ministers, chaired by Pierre Nkurunziza, President of Burundi, decided to rehabilitate the SEP facility in close collaboration with Interpetrol, now the sole shareholder and manager of SEP-Burundi.

The port was damaged in 2023/2024 by floods that cause the waters of Lake Tanganyika to rise. The oil jetty had been rehabilitated, but was submerged, and the pipelines had to be reinstalled.

Presidential decree 100/034 of 20 February 2024 created the Société Pétroliere du Burundi (SOPEBU) a publicly owned company, under the Ministry of Energy. The company was to organize, coordinate and centralize Burundi's orders for oil products, establish a physical stock that would last at least three months, import oil and gas products and distribute oil products fairly to different parts of the counmtry, among other duties.

== See also ==
- List of companies of Burundi
- Economy of Burundi

== Sources ==
- Burundi Port of Bujumbura, Logistics Cluster
- Communique de presse de la reunion du conseil des ministres du mercredi 14 août 2019 (PDF), Burundi Council of Ministers
- Decret No100/034 du 20 fevrier 2024... (PDF) (in French), Burundi
- Exploitation du Port de Bujumbura (EPB) (PDF), EPB
- Hughart, M. D.; Tobias, C.; Killoran, C. H. A. (June 1982), Burundi: Problemes et choix energetiques (PDF) (in French), World Bank
- Maniragaba, Mélance (30 May 2024), "Vers la fin des travaux de modernisation du port de Bujumbura", Burundi Eco (in French)
- Profil national actualise sur la gestion des produits chimiques (PDF) (in French), INECN, December 2009
- Projet de developpement du corridor de transport sur le port de bujumbura et du lac tanganyika et la rehabilitation des voies d’acces au port (PDF), Autorité Maritime, Portuaire et Ferroviaire, August 2019
- Shirambere, Méthode (2007), Le Port de Bujumbura (PDF) (in French)
