= Banque Belgo-Africaine du Burundi =

Belgo-African Bank of Burundi
- Trade name: BBAB
- Native name: Banque Belgo-Africaine Burundi
- Founded: 1949; 76 years ago in Rwanda-Burundi
- Defunct: 1988
- Headquarters: Bujumbura, Burundi

The Belgo-African Bank of Burundi (French: Banque Belgo-Africaine Burundi, BBAB) was a commercial bank in Burundi. It was active between 1949 and 1988, when it was absorbed by BANCOBU.

== Foundation ==
The Belgo-African Bank was created in 1949 with a share capital of 36 million BIF. Owners were Standard Bank (30%), the Bank of Brussels (30%), the government of Zaire (30%) and foreign private investors (10%).

== History ==
In the 1960s there three commercial banks in Burundi, linked to Belgian banking groups, Banque de Credit de Bujumbura (BJB), Banque Commerciale du Burundi (BANCOBU) and BBAB. These banks gave credit to traders and farmers. They were most active during the coffee and cotton harvests between June and September. In the coffee business they avoided the risks of financing during cultivation, when defaults were common, but provided bridgng finance during the period of about three months between sale of coffee and receipt of payments from foreign buyers.

As of 30 September 1976 the BBAB had fixed assets of 0.4 billion BIF almost all in short-term investments. It had no branches in Burundi. It had 500 shares, or 3.1%, of the Banque Nationale de Developpement Economique (BNDE). The financial network of Burundi consisted of the Banque de la Republique du Burundi (the central bank), the three almost entirely foreign-owned commercial banks, as well as the Development Bank (BNDE), the Public Savings Bank (Caisse d'épargne du Burundi), the postal cheque system and the Social Security Fund.

In 1988 the BBAB was absorbed into BANCOBU.

== See also ==
- List of companies of Burundi
- Economy of Burundi

== Sources ==
- Evaluation de la Banque Nationale de Developpement Economique (BNDE) Burundi (PDF) (in French), World Bank, 10 June 1977
- McDonald, Gordon C.; Brennent, Lyle E.; Hibbs, Roy V.; James, Charlene A.; Vincenti, Violeta (November 1969), Area Handbook for BurundiI (PDF), The American University
- Rapport d'activités 2010 (PDF) (in French), Bancobu
