= Meridien Bank Burundi =

Meridien Bank Burundi (MBB)
- Trade name: MBB
- Industry: Finance
- Founded: 1 August 1988
- Defunct: 3 May 1995
- Headquarters: Bujumbura, Burundi
- Owner: Private / public

The Meridien Bank Burundi (Note: The name is also given as "Méridien Bank Burundi" or "Meridian Bank Burundi".), or MBB, was a bank in Burundi, a subsidiary of Meridien BIAO, a network of African banks with headquarters in Zambia. It was launched in 1988 and failed in 1995.

== History ==
Meridien Bank Burundi (MBB) was launched on 1 August 1988, the Burundi subsidiary of Meridien BIAO. The parent had headquarters in Zambia and subsidiary branches in Burkina Faso, Burundi, Cameroon, Gabon, Gambia, Ghana, Kenya, Niger, Sierra Leone, Swaziland, Tanzania and Togo. MBB was a limited liability company with private and public shareholders, and had capital of 800 million BIF (Note: A report written for USAID in 1989 said the initial capital was just 300 million BIF.) when it was founded.

Meridian Bank of Burundi began operations with 48% of shares owned by local private investors, an unexpectedly large percentage. Public and mixed companies had 27% and the parent had 25%. After six months the public investments were 41.3% of the total. By the end of 1988 the bank had assets of 1210.4 million BIF, of which 500 million BIF were government securities.

Melchior Ndadaye, the future President of Burundi, took a correspondence course in banking at the Conservatoire National des Arts et Metiers in Paris between 1987 and 1992. He directed the COOPEC (Coopérative d'Épargne et de Crédit) in Gitega from 1986 until 1988. In 1989 he returned to Bujumbura and became head of Meridien Bank's credit service. He was then put in charge of credit review at Meridien Bank, a post he held when he was elected president in 1993.

In 1994 MBB had a liquidity crisis and its capital was reduced to 506.31 million BIF. The central bank placed it in receivership on 3 May 1995. It was liquidated in September 1995. External auditors discovered serious mismanagement in both MBB and the parent Meridien-BIAO network. The parent had been financing investments with large intergroup loans, with no clear method of repayment. MBB collapsed after Meridien-BIAO failed to pay back a large loan. All the Meridien-BIAO subsidiaries had failed by June 1995.

Meridien Bank was just one of the companies with state ownership that failed due to poor management. Others were CADEBU, COTEBU, Verundi, Onapha, ORABU, OCIBU and Air Burundi.

== See also ==
- List of companies of Burundi
- Economy of Burundi

== Sources ==
- "A Hutu for president in Burundi" (PDF), AFP, 3 June 1993
- Akyeampong, Emmanuel Kwaku; Gates, Henry Louis, eds. (2012), Dictionary of African Biography, vol. 4, Oxford University Press USA, ISBN 9780195382075
- Burundi Recent Economic Developments, International Monetary Fund, 15 December 1997
- International Science & Technology Institute (September 1989), Etude du secteur financier au Burundi (PDF), Bujumbura: USAID, archived from the original (PDF) on March 2, 2017
- Kibazo, Joel (1 June 1995), "Meridien collapse - the inside story", African Business
- Kwizera, Emery (12 April 2024), "Pénuries répétitives : « L'Etat est un mauvais gestionnaire », dixit l'Olucome", Iwacu (in French)
- Nkurunziza, Janvier D.; Ndikumana, Léonce; Nyamoya, Prime (June 2010), The Financial Sector in Burundi (PDF), NBER Africa Project
