= LOVINCO =

Burundian company

Lovinfosse Company
- Trade name: LOVINCO
- Founded: 1947; 79 years ago
- Defunct: 2004
- Headquarters: Burundi

The Lovinfosse Company, known as LOVINCO, was a state-owned company that manufactured cotton blankets in Bujumbura, Burundi.

== History ==
LOVINCO was created on 19 March 1952 as a Belgian Congo limited liability company. By amendment of the Belgian law of 14 June 1962, it became a public limited company under Belgian law. By Decree-Law No. 1/1 of 15 January 1979, it became a company under Burundian law. It manufactured and marketed blankets.

COGERCO was established in 1947. COGERCO arranged for cotton to be planted, grown and harvested. COGERCO separated fiber from seed in its factory. Most of the fiber was sent to the state-owned textile company COTEBU, and seeds to Rafina. COGERCO also delivered fiber to smaller companies included LOVINCO.

Incentives by the Burundian state favored import substitution over exports. LOVINCO was one of the few companies that invested in production for export. In 1991 it was still using old and worn-out machinery from the 1950s, and was producing poor quality blankets that would wear out in two years. However, it was rehabilitating and replacing machinery to improve quality, and had recently started exporting to Uganda.

LOVINCO began to experience difficulties in the 1990s with the outbreak of wars in the Congo, Uganda, and Rwanda, and the Burundian Civil War. These countries constituted its potential market. NGOs and international organizations imported blankets from elsewhere. LOVINCO ceased operations in 2004.

== See also ==
- List of companies of Burundi
- Economy of Burundi

== Sources ==
- Burundi Private Sector Development in the Industrial Sector (PDF), World Bank, 31 December 1991
- Gahungu, Antoine (2012), Dynamique et perspectives de la filiere cotonniere du Burundi (PDF) (thesis) (in French), Université de Liège – Gembloux Agro-bio Tech
- "Les friperies déstabilisent l'industrie textile", Burundi Eco (in French), 19 November 2021
- Majambere, Gustave (2021), Présentation sur les produits et sous-produits du coton au Burundi (PDF) (in French), COGERCO
