= Loterie Nationale du Burundi =

National Lottery of Burundi
- Trade name: LONA
- Native name: Loterie Nationale du Burundi
- Industry: Gambling
- Founded: 1989; 37 years ago
- Headquarters: 14 Avenue d'Italie, Bujumbura, Burundi
- Key people: Fabrice Niragira, CEO
- Owner: Government owned
- LONA headquarters in Bujumbura (Burundi)
- Website: https://lona.gov.bi/

The National Lottery of Burundi (French: Loterie Nationale du Burundi), or LONA is a publicly owned enterprise that regulates gambling in Burundi, and owns some gambling venues.

== Functions ==
LONA regulates gambling in Burundi. It operates the national lottery, sports betting and the Lydia Ludique Burundi casino in the capital. LONA has licensed Rahisibet, an online sportsbook site, which also offers a limited selection of casino slots.

All other forms of gambling are officially illegal, and LONA does not offer licenses. Occasionally they raid illegal casinos and seize equipment. Local gambling websites are unlikely to have the proper licenses, but are unlikely to be targets for LONA. Offshore online gambling operators can still be accessed.

== Casino ==
The Lydia Ludique Burundi (or Lydia Ludic Burundi) casino opened in February 2001 in Bujumbura, at that time the capital of Burundi. It is located in the Asian Quarter, so called because of its large population of Indians. It is a subsidiary of Pefaco Ibellia SA. The casino is jointly owned with LONA and Jacques Renard, a businessman.

The Grupo Pefaco is based in Barcelona, Spain, and operates several "Lydia Ludic" casinos in Cotonou, Benin, as well as casinos in Burundi, Paraguay and Rwanda. The group manages the casinos and partners with public companies that have a gambling monopoly, such as LONA. Typically the casinos include entertainment spaces as well as slot machines, roulette and other gaming options.

Lydia Ludic Burundi Academic is a football team based in Bujumbura that is sponsored by the casino.

== Events ==
LONA operates under the terms defined in Decree No. 100/231 of 11 December 1989, which reorganized the National Lottery of Burundi.

Article 463 of Law No. 1/27 of December 29, 2017, revising the Penal Code, stated that games of chance are prohibited in public places or places open to the public, in all unfenced places where the public can have a direct view, as well as in all other places, even private ones, where anyone wishing to indulge in these games is freely admitted to enter.

On 24 November 2020 LONA authorized Lumitel, a mobile operator, to offer a mobile lottery to subscribers. The lottery was launched on 1 July 2021.

In an article of 12 August 2021, Le Mandat stated that the general manager and commercial director of LONA were being investigated on suspicion of having illegally obtained large sums through corruption. Evariste Ndayishimiye, President of Burundi, had ordered all gambling houses to temporarily close, and was alleged to have ordered the start of a National Intelligence Service investigation. The report alleged that companies had paid bribes to the executives in exchange for licences. The general manager denied the allegations, saying 12 gaming companies had been approved by LONA and had each paid the required US$50,000 licence fee. LONA had received a number of complaints, and had ordered the games suspended while they reviewed the gaming regulations. As of 19 August 2021 employees of the National Lottery, casino and sports betting venues had been suspended for two months without being paid.

On 5 July 2023 the Council of Ministers adopted a strategic plan to control and regulate gambling. It would limit and supervise consumption, and would control and regulate operators. Gambling rooms could not be set up in poor or working-class neighborhoods. The policy would extends from 2023 to 2035, during which time some gambling concession contracts would end. LONA would cease commercial activities and become purely a Gambling Regulatory Agency.

In October 2023 Martin Niteretse, Minister of the Interior, Community Development and Public Security, said sports betting was a scam that should be fought. He noted that casino games had been suspended throughout the country. That month, Burundi Eco reporters visited sports betting rooms in Bujumbura, where they found that children under 18 were allowed in. Children might not be allowed to bet in the rooms, but could bet on the internet.

In February 2024 N-Soft announced that, in collaboration with the Ministry of Finance and the Ministry of Commerce, their technology would be implemented to oversee the gambling industry. LONA would be the main user, and the software would supervise the eight existing gambling providers in Burundi. In the first phase it would cover lotteries, online platforms, sports betting and horse racing. In the second phase it would cover casino operations, including slot machines. The software would compile data such as player registrations, game results and jackpot distributions, and calculate betting revenue and profits.

In May 2024, Audace Niyonzima, Minister of Finance, Budget and Economic Planning, reported to the Senate on dividends paid by public and mixed enterprises. He noted that some public companies had never paid their dividends, including Onatel (National Telecommunications Office), Camebu (Central Medical Purchasing Agency), Cogerco (Cotton Management Company), Loterie Nationale du Burundi, Onatour, Otraco (Public Transport Office) and the Hôtel Source du Nil. Some had recorded negative results, and others had not taken the required steps to calculate dividends.

== See also ==
- List of companies of Burundi

== Sources ==
- "Burundi: Ouverture à Bujumbura Du Premier Casino Burundi", Panafrican News Agency (in French), Dakar, 18 February 2001
- Decret No. 100/224 du 30 Septembre 2011 portant nomination du directeur general et des directeurs a la Loteria Nationale de Burundi "LONA" (in French)
- "Grupo Pefaco", World Casino Directory
- Igiraneza, Jules Bercy (24 May 2024), "Les dividendes des entreprises publiques en débat au Sénat", Iwacu (in French)
- "Le Conseil des ministres adopte la stratégie nationale de la coopération au développement", ABP (in French), 11 July 2023
- "Lydia Ludic Burundi Academic", Footboom
- "Lydialudic, un acteur de poids dans le monde des casinos africains", Afrique en Marche (in French), 7 October 2021
- "LONA : Le duo Christian-Kefa au cœur des magouilles financières ?", Le Mandat (in French), 12 August 2021
- "Loterie Nationale du Burundi", Casino Zone
- Lumitel is pleased to announce the launch of the LUMILOTO electronic lottery service from July 1, 2021 (Press Release), Bujumbura: Lumitel, 3 July 2021
- N-Soft renforce la Souveraineté Numérique et l'Intelligence Économique avec un Nouveau Partenariat au Burundi (in French), N-Soft, 21 February 2024
- "Sous suspension, les employés des maisons de jeux de hasard viennent de passer deux mois sans salaire", Radio Inzamba (in French), 19 August 2021
- Tuyubahe, Méchaël (12 October 2023), "Paris sportifs : quel gaspillage de ressources ?", Burundi Eco (in French)
