= Verundi =

Société Pétroliere du Burundi
- Trade name: Verundi
- Industry: Bottle and glass manufacturing
- Headquarters: Bujumbura, Burundi
- Owner: Government of Burundi

The Société Bouteillerie-Verrerie du Burundi (Burundi Bottle and Glass Company), or Verundi, was a public company that made glass products in Burundi.

== History ==
The African Solidarity Fund supported the establishment of the Verundi company. In 1989 Verundi was one of the largest state-owned manufacturing firms in Burundi, others being COTEBU (Complexe Textile de Bujumbura) and most of the plants that processed coffee. In 1987 Verundi's exports of glass bottles rose to 456 million BIF, but fell back in 1988 to 325 million BIF.

Verundi also made products for the domestic market, such as jars for the Bugarama jam factory. Verundi closed down with the 1993 crisis, the start of the Burundian Civil War. Verundi was just one of the state-owned companies that failed due to poor management. Others were the Cotebu, Cadebu, Meridian Bank (Burundi), Onapha, Otrabu, Ocibu and Air Burundi.

On 8 March 2019 TLLINNO of Burundi signed a memorandum of understanding with Sklostroj Turnov of the Czech Republic for production of bottles and other glass products. The former Verundi site would be used for the new factory, which would cost 15 million euros. Plans were to create over 150 permanent jobs and to produce 45 to 50 million bottles per year. SKLOSTROJ would provide the equipment and expertise.

== See also ==
- List of companies of Burundi
- Economy of Burundi

== Sources ==
- "Bientôt une verrerie au sein de TLLINNO", Burundi Eco (in French), 15 March 2019
- Harerimana, Egide (29 June 2022), "Le Fonds de Solidarité Africain pour l'accompagnement des projets entrepreneurials", Iwacu
- Kwizera, Emery (12 April 2024), "Pénuries répétitives : « L'Etat est un mauvais gestionnaire », dixit l'Olucome", Iwacu (in French)
- "La CEPGL en phase de relance de ses activités", Burundi Forum (in French), 6 July 2014
- Mori Dianė (1 December 1989), Export Enhancement Program Republic of Burundi (PDF), USAID, archived from the original (PDF) on February 22, 2017
- Nzeyimana, Martine (19 February 2016), "La Confiturerie de Bugarama : la fraise peut mener au vin !", Iwacu (in French)
