= Banque de Gestion et de Financement =

Bank based in Bujumbura, Burundi

Management and Financing Bank
- Trade name: BGF
- Native name: Banque de Gestion et de Financement
- Industry: Financial services
- Predecessor: Société de Gestion et de Financement (SOGEFI)
- Founded: 1 April 1996; 30 years ago
- Headquarters: 30, Blvd de la Liberté, Bujumbura, Burundi
- Area served: Burundi
- Key people: Daniella Nziyumvira (Chairperson); Jean Marie Clair Gashubije (CEO)
- Products: Banking services
- BGF Headquarters (Burundi)
- Website: bgf.bi

The Management and Financing Bank (French: Banque de Gestion et de Financement), or BGF, is a bank based in Bujumbura, Burundi.

== History ==
The Société de Gestion et de Financement (SOGEFI) was created in 1992 by a group of businessmen, with no public office. On 1 April 1996 the BGF was created by the same group as a commercial bank, taking over the assets of SOGEFI. The bank managed deposits, withdrawals, credit, exchange, investment, treasury, discount of effects, commissions and resumption of participation. Capital was 600 million BIF in 1996, and equity was 430 million BIF.

BGF expanded into several provinces of Burundi. As of 2024 it had 9 public offices in Bujumbura Mairie, and had opened 16 agencies:

- Headquarters (1996)
- Mwaro (1999)
- Gatumba (2001)
- Kayanza (2004)
- Ngozi (2004)
- Muyinga (2004)
- Rumonge (2006)
- Makamba (2007)
- Orée du Golf and Gitega (2011)
- Ruyigi (2012)
- Avenue du Commerce (2014)
- BCM (2018)
- Muramvya (2019)
- Petro Muha (2020)
- Kinindo (2023)

As of 2008 BGF had 146 employees in eight branches. It had 32.7 billion BIF in assests, 22.7 billion BIF in deposits and 20.1 billion BIF of loans. It had 13,632 accounts, about 10% of the total in Burundi at that time.

In April 2021 the bank celebrated its 25th anniversary in Bujumbura at a ceremony attended by Prosper Bazombanza, vice-president of Burundi. By 2021 capital was 27 billion BIF and equity was 33 billion BIF. The bank was entirely owned by private citizens of Burundi.

In April 2021 the Trade and Development Fund of the TDB Group issued a partial risk guarantee facility of 500 million BIF to the Women's Initiative for Self-Empowerment (WISE), a micro-finance institution established in 2007. This would allow WISE to borrow 1 billion BIF, or about US$510,000, from BGF, which WISE would lend to women as small and medium enterprise loans, particularly in agribusiness and trade.

In 2024 BGF was one of ten banks that had been approved by the Banque de la République du Burundi (BRB) as a Treasury Valuation Specialist.

== See also ==
- List of companies of Burundi
- List of banks in Burundi
- Economy of Burundi

== Sources ==
- Barangenza, Laurent (2 May 2021), "La BGF Célèbre son jubilé d'argent", Radio Télévision Nationale du Burundi (in French)
- Historique de la BGF (in French), BGF
- Liste des SVT (in French), Banque de la République du Burundi
- Nkurunziza, Janvier D.; Ndikumana, Léonce; Nyamoya, Prime (August 2012), The Financial Sector in Burundi (PDF), National Bureau of Economic Research
- TDB Group unlocks funding for women-led small and medium enterprises in Burundi via its SME programme, TDB Group, 20 April 2021
