= Banque Burundaise pour le Commerce et l'Investissement =

Burundian Bank for Commerce and Investment
- Trade name: BBCI
- Native name: Banque Burundaise Pour le Commerce et l'Investissement
- Industry: Banking
- Founded: 1 September 1988; 37 years ago in Bujumbura, Burundi
- Headquarters: Chaussée du Peuple Murundi, B.P 2320, Bujumbura, Burundi
- Key people: Tharcisee Rutumo, Chairperson; Aude Toyi, CEO,
- BBCI Headquarters (Burundi)
- Website: https://www.bbcibank.com/

The Burundian Bank for Commerce and Investment (French: Banque Burundaise Pour le Commerce et l'Investissement, BBCI) is a bank in Burundi.

== History ==
The bank was originally incorporated as "Arab Burundi Bank for Commerce and Investment" (ABB) by Ministerial Order No. 550/063 of 12 March 1988. The bank was established on 1 September 1988 with capital of 18,073,944,000 BIF. On 19 November 1990 the Bank was renamed "Burundian Bank for Commerce and Investment" (BBCI), a mixed economy (public-private) company under private law.

From 2005, the bank opened branches throughout the country. In February 2017 BBCI opened a four-storey office in Bururi, in the southwest of the country. In 2017 the bank chose to replace its IT systems with the ERI's Olympic Banking System.

== See also ==
- List of companies of Burundi
- Economy of Burundi

== Sources ==
- "Burundi : La BBCI ouvre dans son nouveau bâtiment à Bururi", AGnews (in French), 22 February 2017
- "Burundi's BBCI selects Olympic Banking System", Finextra, 11 September 2017
- Hasaba, Fidèle (2011), Normes d'octroi des crédits par la BBCI (Banque Burundaise pour le Commerce et l'Investissement ), sur la période 2005- 2008
- Supervision Bancaire (in French), Banque de la République du Burundi
