= Savonor =

- Founded: 1970; 56 years ago
- Founder: Dieter Kuntze
- Headquarters: 12 Chaussée Uvira, Quartier Industriel P.O Box 1107; Bujumbura, Burundi
- Key people: Matthias Kuntze, CEO
- Products: Hygiene, food and cosmetic products
- Savonor Headquarters (Burundi)
- Website: www.savonor.com

Savonor is a company based in Bujumbura, Burundi, that manufactures hygiene, food and cosmetic products in Burundi. It was founded in 1970 by Dieter Kuntze and has about 2,000 employees across its hygiene products and edible oils divisions.

== History ==
The Kuntze family started to manufacture soap in Germany in 1814. Dieter Kuntze travelled to Egypt, Uganda and Burundi in the 1960s. In 1970 he founded "Savon d'or" in Burundi. After he retired in 1996, his son Matthias Kuntze took over as chairman.

Starting in 2006, the company bought oil palm plantations, refined the product to make vegetable oil, and further processed it to make soaps, detergents, sanitizers and other products, as well as edible oils. It continues to source input from smallholder farmers.

During the COVID-19 crisis, in 2020 UNICEF made an agreement with Savonor under which the company reduced its normal profit margin, and with funding from USAID, CERF, the World Bank and UNICEF manufactured "Blue Soap", the same product as its regular basic soap apart from the color, and sold it at half price. This affordable soap would also help reduce the incidence of other infectious diseases.

As of 2021 the company had two main divisions: hygiene products and edible oils. It had about 2,000 employees. Most of its business was in Burundi, but it also traded in the Democratic Republic of Congo (DRC) and Tanzania. At first the company bought palm oil from other companies and processed it to make soap. Rafina uses cotton seeds from COGERCO to produce cottonseed oil and oilcake. Byproducts are sold to Savonor.

As of 2024 Savonor had over 800 hectares (2,000 acres) of oil palms. It had three oil extraction units, a palm oil refinery and several soap manufacturing factories, Savonor used a fleet of trucks to deliver its products to 40 distributions points throughout Burundi.

== See also ==
- List of companies of Burundi
- Economy of Burundi

== Sources ==
- Gahungu, Antoine (2012), Dynamique et perspectives de la filiere cotonniere du Burundi (PDF) (thesis) (in French), Université de Liège – Gembloux Agro-bio Tech
- Kaapa, Marcus; Gray, Ryan (24 September 2021), "Savonor : Soap Through the Centuries", Africa Outlook
- Majambere, Gustave (2021), Présentation sur les produits et sous-produits du coton au Burundi (PDF) (in French), COGERCO
- "Savonor", Devex
- Savonor, Mastercard Foundation
- UNICEF in Burundi and Savonor S.A, the main soap and oil manufacturer in the country, unite to make soap affordable for the population in an effort to prevent COVID-19, UNICEF, 10 July 2020
