= CAMEBU =

Publicly owned enterprise

Burundi Central Purchasing Department of Pharmaceutical Products
- Trade name: CAMEBU
- Native name: Centrale d’achat des médicaments essentiels, des dispositifs médicaux et des produits et matériels de laboratoire du Burundi
- Industry: Medical supplies
- Founded: 29 March 2000; 26 years ago
- Headquarters: 1 Avenue Nyabisindu, Quartier Industriel, B.P. 1332 Bujumbura, Burundi
- Products: Medicines, medical devices, laboratory devices
- CAMEBU headquarters in Bujumbura (Burundi)
- Website: camebu.net

The Burundi Central Purchasing Department of Pharmaceutical Products (French: Centrale d’achat des médicaments essentiels, des dispositifs médicaux et des produits et matériels de laboratoire du Burundi), or CAMEBU is a publicly owned enterprise that imports and distributes medicines and other medical supplies in Burundi. Established in 2000, it operates under the direct supervision of the Ministry of Public Health and is regulated by the Burundian Regulatory Authority for Medicines for Human Use and Food (ABREMA).

== Foundation and mission ==
CAMEBU was created by Decree No. 100/035 of 29 March 2000. It is under the direct supervision of the Ministry of Public Health. Its main purpose is to ensure a supply of essential generic medicines, medical devices, products and laboratory materials for public clinics, private clinics and pharmacies. It makes these supplies geographically and financially accessible throughout Burundi, manages the inventory of supplies, recovers costs and stabilizes prices.

The Burundian Regulatory Authority for Medicines for Human Use and Food (Autorité Burundaise de Régulation des Médicaments à Usage Humain et des Aliments or ABREMA) is the division of the Ministry of Health responsible for regulations and oversight of the pharmaceutical sector. ABREMA also regulates the semi-autonomous CAMEBU. CAMEBU must issue international calls for tenders so that suppliers compete to give the lowest prices.

== History ==
In January 2012 CAMEBU was supporting 422 clients, including hospitals, health districts, religious denominations and rural pharmacies. The plant had six storage warehouses, two air-conditioned rooms, two cold rooms (from 2° to 8°), as well as a separate store containing flammable products. The CAMEBU storage facility was built in 1990 to store medicines at the appropriate temperature and humidity for 4 million inhabitants. As of 2012 it was supporting 8 million people. The government had rented additional space and was building extensions to the storage buildings, but there was uncertainty about funding.

In 2014 Iwacu reported that CAMEBU had just completed construction of two new drug storage sheds. The report noted that private pharmaceutical suppliers could also import medicines, and they could raise prices when CAMEBU had a shortage. Districts could obtain supplies from private pharmacies if they were not available from CAMEBU. Other issues were that medicines were being stolen between being acquired by CAMEBU and received by the health centers, and that health district managers and health center managers sometimes diverted supplies intended for public health centers to their private health centers.

In September 2016 Iwacu reported that CAMEBU was burning about 12 tons of expired pharmaceutical products in a ditch about 15 metres (49 ft) deep at Kumusenyi. The site was 2 metres (6 ft 7 in) from the RN1 road from Bujumbura to Kanyaru. Local residents were complaining about the smoke and smell. A professor at the University of Burundi said the approach was dangerous, since the products were burned in the open air at relatively low temperatures. The managing director of CAMEBU explained that they used to burn the expired products at Buterere rubbish dump, like other urban waste. They had realized that this was inappropriate since the site was so close to Lake Tanganyika, and could pollute the lake. The Kumusenyi site was on rocky, impervious ground, with few inhabitants, near to forest that could absorb the CO_{2} from the smoke.

In May 2019 Martin Nivyabando, Minister of Social Affairs, stated that CAMEBU would now be the only central supplier of medicine in Burundi. CAMEBU would collaborate with the Mutuelle de la Fonction publique (MFP) so they could import medicine direct from the manufacturer. This would ensure good prices and avoid delays in supplying medicines, which formerly could be 7 to 12 months.

In September 2020, with help from USAID, the Central Medical Store began to convert from a distribution system based only on pull to one that included active push distribution as well as pull. The goal was to optimise storage, transport and availability of health commodities. The change was made during the COVID-19 crisis with the introduction of multi-month distribution of anti-retroviral products. The approach was piloted in 11 health districts, and after three rounds of active distributions was scaled up to all 48 health districts.

That month Thaddée Ndikumana, Minister of Public Health and the Fight against AIDS, said that CAMEBU would start delivering medicines to health districts. In the past, health districts had to obtain supplies from CAMEBU, and incur the risk of damage and accidents along the road. The measure would first be implemented in the 11 northern health districts, but would be rolled out to all districts by November 2021. CAMEBU was planning to instal supply points in the interior of Burundi, starting with Gitega. In April 2022 Sylvie Nzeyimana, Minister of Public Health and the Fight against AIDS, opened the CAMEBU center in Gitega.

A 2023 report said that public hospitals often lacked medicines or medical equipment, and patients were forced to obtain supplies and tests from private operators. The hospitals could not buy medicines directly from the manufacturers, but had to wait for CAMEBU to import them. They had medical equipment, but when it broke down had to wait for the sub-region to send repair technicians. The hospitals were said to favor patients who had private insurance or who could pay in cash, as opposed to patients covered by the Mutuelle de la Fonction publique (MFP), which was slow to reimburse them.

In May 2024, Audace Niyonzima, Minister of Finance, Budget and Economic Planning, reported to the Senate on dividends paid by public and mixed enterprises. He noted that some public companies had never paid their dividends, including Onatel (National Telecommunications Office), Camebu, Cogerco (Cotton Management Company), Loterie Nationale du Burundi (Lona), Onatour, Otraco (Public Transport Office) and the Hôtel Source du Nil. Some had recorded negative results, and others had not taken the required steps to calculate dividends.

== See also ==
- List of companies of Burundi

== Sources ==
- "Burundi : Collaboration entre la CAMEBU et la mutuelle MFP", AGnews (in French), 7 May 2019
- Burundi Malaria Profile (PDF), USAID, May 2022
- "CAMEBU", Africa Business
- Igiraneza, Jules Bercy (24 May 2024), "Les dividendes des entreprises publiques en débat au Sénat", Iwacu (in French)
- "La CAMEBU incapable de stocker les médicaments", Isanganiro (in French), 3 February 2012
- "La CAMEBU rapproche ses services à la population", ABP (in French), 29 April 2022
- Launching Health Commodity Active Distribution in Burundi, USAID Global Health Supply Chain Program, 15 February 2022
- Madirisha, Edouard (6 July 2014), "La Camebu au service de la santé publique", Iwaci (in French)
- Manishatse, Lorraine Josiane (16 September 2016), "Expired pharmaceutical products burned in the open air", Iwacu English
- Ntandwi, Dieudonné (23 September 2020), "CAMEBU: lancement de la distribution active des médicaments aux districts sanitaires", RTN Burundi (in French)
- Ruzagiriza, Dona Fabiola (23 June 2023), "Hospitalisation dans les structures de santé publiques : Les patients se lamentent", Burundi Eco (in French)
