= CAMOFI =

Caisse de Mobilization et de Financement
- Trade name: CAMOFI
- Industry: Finance
- Founded: 13 October 1977
- Defunct: 11 November 1998
- Headquarters: Bujumbura, Burundi
- Owner: Government of Burundi

The Caisse de Mobilization et de Financement (Mobilization and Financing Fund), or CAMOFI, was a state-owned development bank in Burundi.

== History ==
CAMOFI was founded in 1977 as a state-controlled development bank with equity capital of 200 million BIF. State owned enterprises had to use CAMOFI or the central bank to handle their deposits, and CAMOFI was the only deposit institution allowed to buy Treasury bonds. The commercial banks had to make interest-free deposits with CAMOFI equal to defined percentages of different types of deposit made with the banks.

Grégoire Banyiyezako, an economist by training, was Director-General of CAMOFI from September 1995 until November 1996. He later became Minister of Commerce, Industry and Tourism and then Governor of the Bank of the Republic of Burundi (Central Bank). Antoine Nduwayo, an ethnic Tutsi, who was Prime Minister of Burundi from February 1995 to July 1996, became Director-General of CAMOFI.

CAMOFI provided funding to medium and long-term projects. It never made significant profits and was poorly managed by the former prime minister. The central bank injected cash into CAMOFI several times in attempts to save it. In 1997 it lost 560 million BIF before subsidies, nearly three times its equity capital. It collapsed in November 1998 with debts that were more than five times its equity. The CEO went on to run the Banque de commerce et de développement (BCD) when it was created on 14 January 1999.

The first deputy general of the central bank stated in October 2003 that CAMOFI and CADEBU had collapsed due to "gestion laxiste" (lax management), but it would be more accurate to say that they were plundered. The ruling elite had treated state enterprises such as CAMOFI and CADEBU as sources of rents. The managers, their friends, and politically connected people with large loans probably benefitted from their failure.

== See also ==
- List of companies of Burundi
- Economy of Burundi

== Sources ==
- "Grégoire Banyiyezako", Repertoire (in French), 30 June 2008
- Nkurunziza, Janvier D.; Ndikumana, Léonce; Nyamoya, Prime (June 2010), The Financial Sector in Burundi (PDF), NBER Africa Project
- Report No. 6754-BU Structural Adjustment and Development Issues (PDF), World Bank, 20 January 1988
- Un apartheid qui ne dit pas son nom (PDF), Bujumbura: FRODEBU, August 1997
