= Royal Air Burundi =

Airlines of Ruanda-Urundi

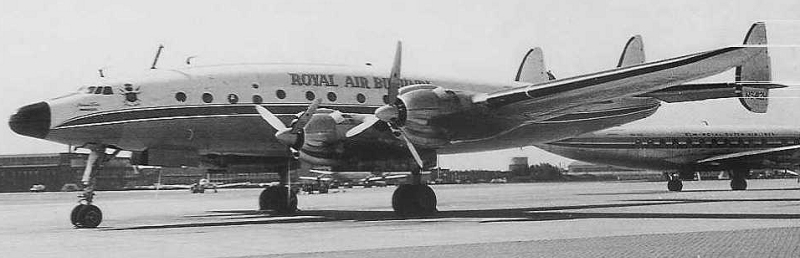
- Royal Air Burundi Lockheed Connie
IATA	ICAO	Call sign
-	-	-
- Commenced operations: 1962
- Ceased operations: 1963
- Fleet size: 1 Lockheed Constellation
- Headquarters: Usumbura, Burundi

Royal Air Burundi was an airline from Ruanda-Urundi and was based in Usumbura.

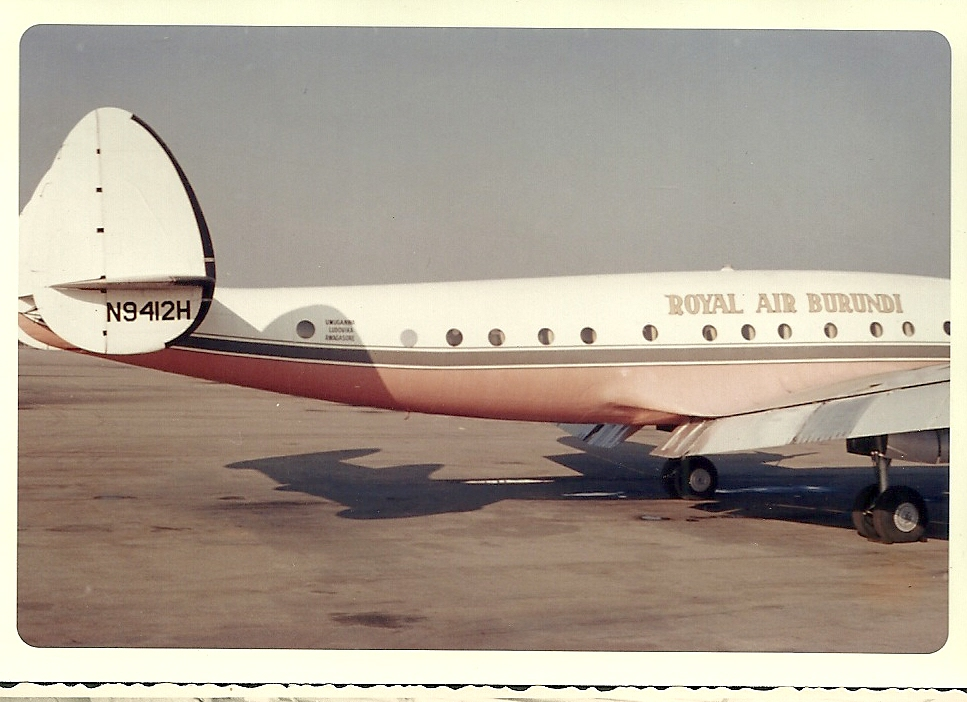
A view of the Royal Air Burundi Lockheed Connie

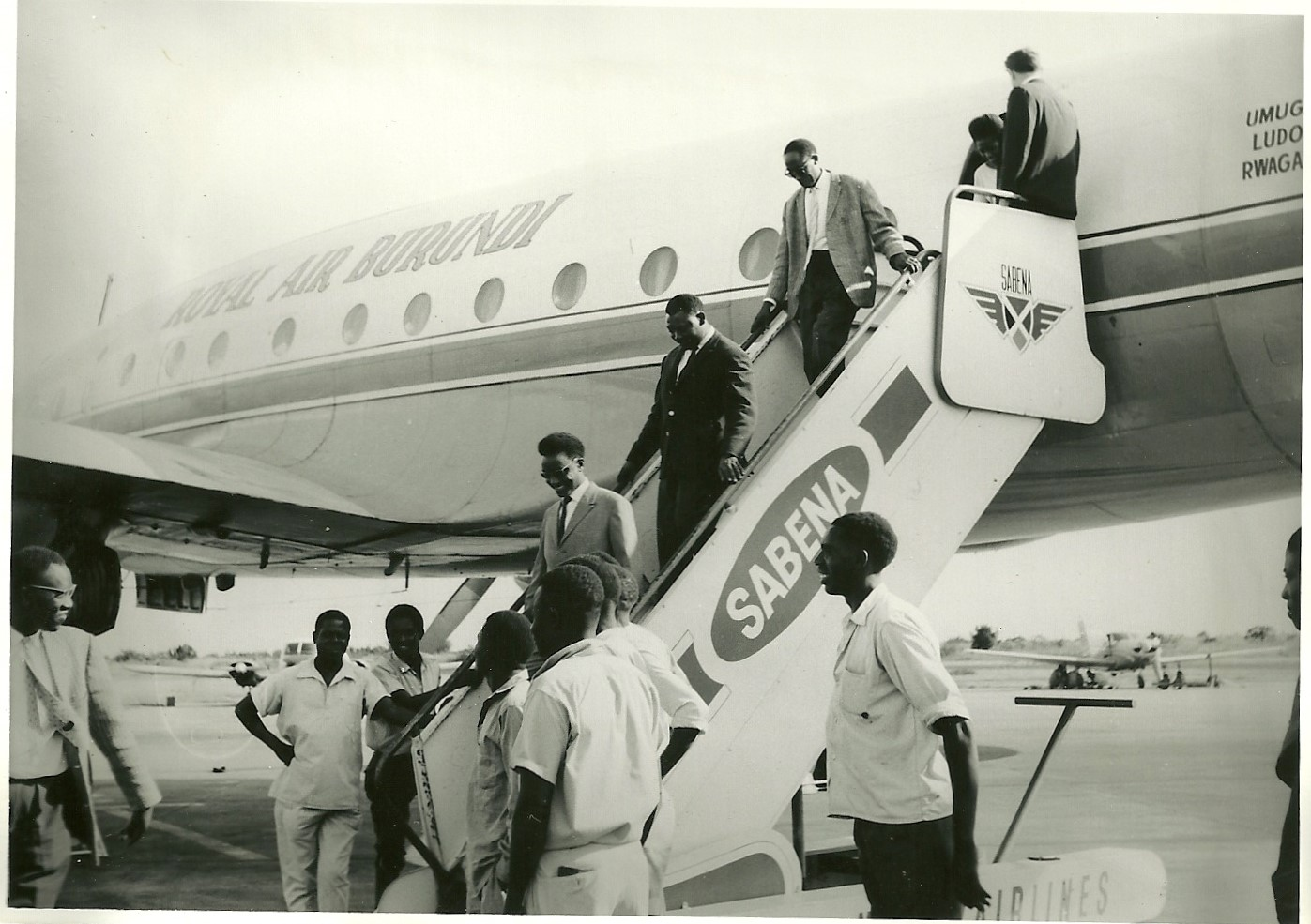
Passengers disembarking a Royal Burundi aircraft.

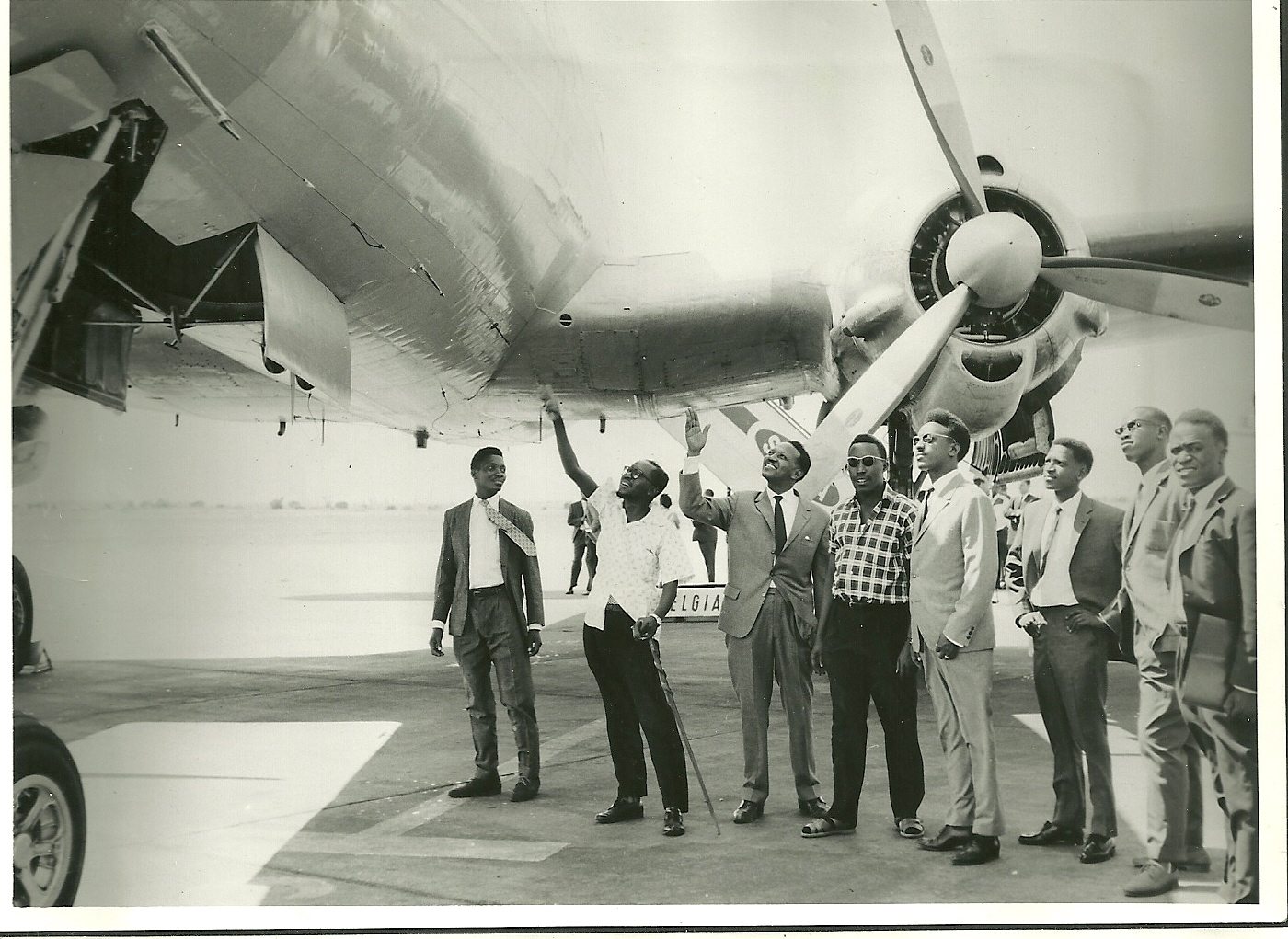
Officials inspecting one of the aircraft

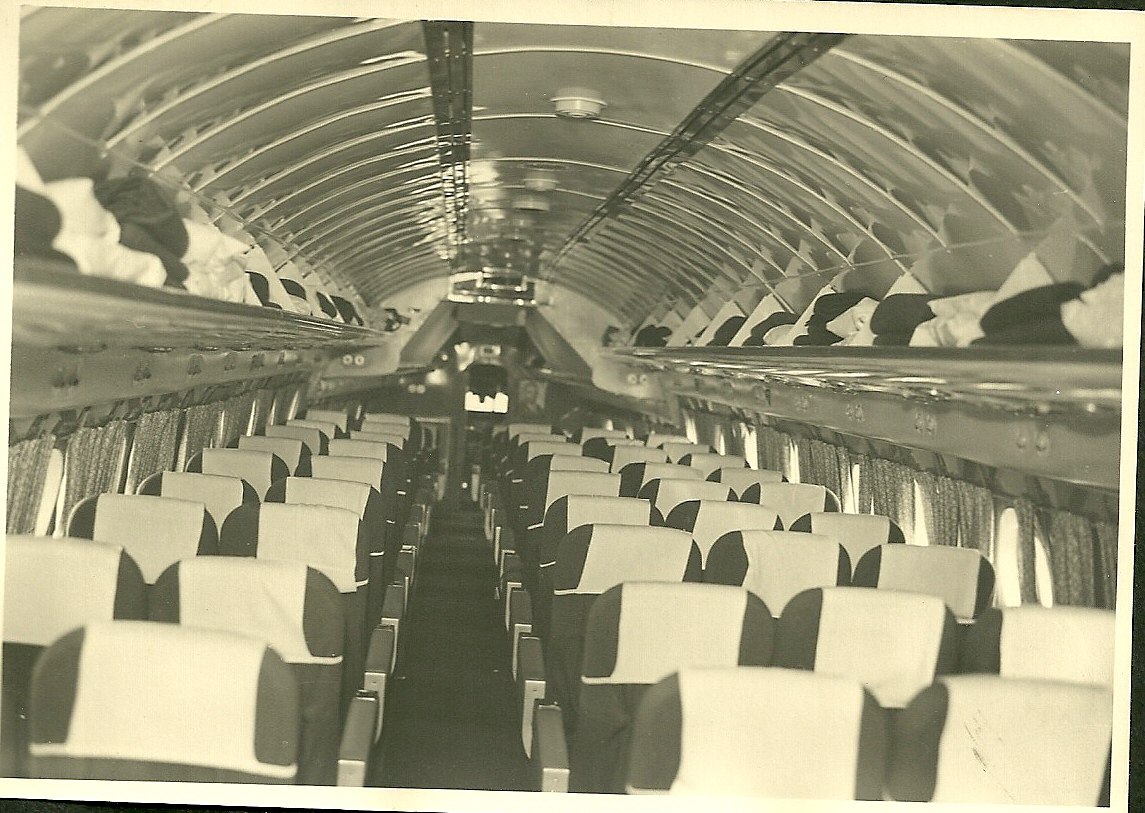
Interior of one of the aircraft

The airline was formed in 1962 to perform non-scheduled passenger flights utilising a Lockheed L.049 Constellation N9412H, which was obtained from Las Vegas Hacienda. The national airline of newly independent Burundi made numerous passenger flights to Europe, and ceased operations at the end of 1963.

== See also ==
- List of companies of Burundi
- Economy of Burundi
