= City Connexion Airlines =

Airline based in Burundi

IATA	ICAO	Call sign
G3	CIX	Connexion
- Founded: 1998
- Ceased operations: 2000
- Operating bases: Bujumbura International Airport
- Fleet size: 2

City Connexion Airlines was an airline based in Burundi. The airline was founded in 1998 when it moved its Air Operator's Certificate from the British Virgin Islands to Burundi. It started scheduled service with two Let 410s from Bujumbura to Beni, Bunia, Entebbe, Goma, Kigali, and Kigoma. The carrier was an affiliate of Air Trans Lloyd Cargo. The airline ceased all operations in 2000, however, no source for a declared bankruptcy has been found. The IATA code for the airline was later re-used by Gol Linhas Aéreas Inteligentes in Brazil.

== Fleet ==
As of August 2006, the City Connexion Airlines fleet still included the following aircraft, though no flights were being operated:

- 1 Let L-410 UVP

== See also ==
- List of companies of Burundi
- Economy of Burundi
