= OTRACO =

OTRACO may refer to

- Office d'Exploitation des Transports Coloniaux, a company that operated railways, ports, and inland barge transport in the Belgian Congo
- Office des Transports en Commun, a publicly owned enterprise that inspects vehicles and operates public transport in Burundi
