= Hôtel Source du Nil =

- Location within Burundi

General information
- Coordinates: 3.37900°S 29.36005°E
- Owner: Government owned

Website
- https://hotelsourcedunil.bi/

The Hôtel Source du Nil is a state-owned hotel in Bujumbura, Burundi.

== Location ==
The hotel is located on the west side of the Avenue du Stade in downtown Bujumbura. It backs onto the Golf de Bujumbura golf course to its west.

== Early days ==
The hotel was opened in July 1979 as the Hotel Méridien Source du Nil. As of 1981 the hotel was part of the Méridien chain, which also owned the Umubano Hotel in Kigali, Rwanda. It was the best hotel in Bujumbura. It was not busy, and most of the guests were businessmen, politicians and African diplomats. Prices were very reasonable.

The hotel was a long white building with a rather characterless facade owned by local investors. It was set in a tropical park, with a magnificent view of Lake Tanganyika from the terrace. There was a nine-hole golf course, a riding club, a nautical club, a private beach and swimming pool and several tennis courts.

The interior had opulent decoration of African inspiration. It had a laundry, a large conference room with 350 seats, five meeting rooms, a shopping arcade with a hairdressing salon, a 150-seat "grande carte" restaurant, a snack bar and a night club. The 160 rooms were "four-star luxury". They all had a balcony, a modern bathroom, a telephone, a radio, mini-bar and air-conditioning.

== Concession process ==
The hotel was nationalized and run by the Burundi Hotel and Tourism Company (Société Hotelière et Touristique du Burundi: SHTB). In November 1999 the SHTB put the hotel up for sale as one lot that included the grounds, buildings, equipment, working materials, furniture, and miscellaneous materials.

A process to grant a concession to the hotel was launched on 5 November 2009, and a steering committee for the process was formed in April 2010. An international call for tenders was issued, and Serena Hotels was chosen, with an MOU signed in August 2012. TPS East Africa (TPS EA) is the owner of Serena Hotels Group. The Aga Khan Fund for Economic Development is its main shareholder. Burundi's political stability influenced the decision.

A draft concession contract was presented to the Council of Ministers on 5 March 2015. The existing building was to be upgraded to a 3-star hotel, or to luxury apartments, and a new 5-star hotel and international conference hall were to be built. In May 2018 Serena Hotels withdrew from the negotiations. On 11 July 2018 the Council of Ministers discussed the options of converting the building into civil servants offices, or looking for another lessee for the concession.

Companies wholly or partially owned by the state that were reporting negative results in 2021 included Hôtel Source du Nil, Onatel, Cogerco, Tanganyika Mining Burundi, Regideso, Socabu and Sodeco. In the 2021 financial year the Hôtel Source du Nil had debt of 347,711,085 BIF. This had risen to 593,929,136 BIF for 2022. No progress had been made on the concession by June 2024.

== See also ==
- List of companies of Burundi
- Economy of Burundi

== Sources ==
- "Burundi: Le –Source Du Nil – passe sous Serena Hotels", AGnews (in French), 20 October 2010
- EAC-Burundi WT/TPR/S/271/BDI, World Trade Organization, 2012
- Froment, Gérard-Jean (1982), Guide pratique des hôtels must du monde (in French), Paris: Editions Icotecnica, ISBN 2-904064-00-1
- Niyongabo, Jean Marie Vianney (7 January 2022), "L'Onatel, pourra-t-il ressusciter un jour ?", Burundi Eco (in French)
- Nzoyibonera, Jonathan (24 June 2024), Hôtel Source du Nil : Vers la recherche d'un partenaire pour sa rénovation (in French)
- Sale of Hotel Source du Nil, Net Press
- "Way: Hotel Source du Nil (87173548)", OpenStreetMap, 19 March 2013
