= Transport Board of Burundi =

Transport Board of Burundi'
- Trade name: OTRABU
- Native name: Office des Transports du Burundi
- Defunct: 1991
- Successor: OTRACO
- Owner: Government of Burundi

The Transport Board of Burundi (Office des Transports du Burundi), or OTRABU, was a state-owned company that ran trucks and buses in Burundi. It was created in the 1970s, its debts were written off in 1979 and again in 1984, and it was finally liquidated in 1991.

== Road transport company ==
Due to disputes within and between countries in the Great Lakes region in the 1980s, landlocked countries such as Burundi tried to establish new routes to the ports of Mombasa, Kenya, and Dar es Salaam, Tanzania, that would be secure and economical. The Organization Transportes Regionaux Au Burundi (OTRABU) was founded to achieve transit security. The Ministry of Transport, Posts and Telecommunications owned OTRABU, which had a monopoly on road transport along the Northern Corridor.

OTRABU periodically contracted with the Office National de la Tourbe (ONATOUR) to transport peat from its bog sites to Bujumbura. In 1979 the government of Burundi assumed service of OTRABU's debt due to its financial difficulties.

The 1,804 kilometres (1,121 mi) Northern Corridor route from Mombasa to Bujumbura, Burundi, is entirely graded and asphalted. OTRABU obtained sophisticated Mercedes trucks to operate this route, helped by German technical cooperation. It had priority on this route from March 1981, but after three years the fleet had deteriorated greatly due to many accidents. OTRABU's share of the traffic fell to 21% of the total, and it had to cede the route to foreign private importers.

OTRABU was wound up before August 1984. (Note: The collapse of OTRABU in 1984 appears to have been a technical liquidation in which its debts to the government were written off. A draft Japanese agreement to build a bus depot for OTRABU was prepared later in 1984. The successor company was providing trucking services in 1988.) After its collapse, transport services in the Northern and Central Corridors were provided by private road hauliers, mostly registered in Burundi.

== Bus company ==
The Office des Transports du Burundi (OTRABU) was created in 1985. It operated 45 buses. In Bujumbura city it had 12 Mercedes-Benz buses and 21 Isuzu buses. For intercity transport it had 10 Mercedes-Benz buses, 2 Toyota buses and one Isuzu bus. In 1985 Japan donated 35 Isuzu buses.

In October 1984 a team from the Japan International Cooperation Agency met with the Burundi government representatives to discuss a project for building bus maintenance facilities for OTRABU in the New Industrial Zone of Bujumbura. It would include an administration building, 4-bay lubrication / control station, petrol station with storage for 40,000 litres (8,800 imp gal; 11,000 US gal), car washing station, workshop / storage complex, lavatory and parking for 100 working buses and for buses needing repair.

A May 1988 report from the International Development Association on a proposed development credit of SDR 64.9 million to the Republic of Burundi found that OTRABU had the potential to become profitable through a rehabilitation program based on partial privatization and elimination of all government subsidies, combined with improvements to internal management, fleet composition and a now focus on profitable activities and customers.

Later in 1988 the government's Service in Charge of Public Enterprises helped prepare a rehabilitation program for OTRABU and other public companies (CADEBU, OTRACO, ONAPHA and Verundi) to form the basis for performance contracts between the government and the companies. Most prices had been deregulated and the state-owned companies were expected to compete with private companies.

In 1988 OTRABU had to give up transport of petrol and oil products due to strong competition from private companies with new trucks, where OTRABU's fleet was older. OTRABU was liquidated on 2 September 1991. It was succeeded by OTRACO.

== See also ==
- List of companies of Burundi
- Economy of Burundi

== Sources ==
- Anyango, Gordon (April 1997), Comparative Transportation Cost Analysis in East Africa (PDF), USAID
- Burundi alternative energy: Peat ii (695-0103) formative evaluation (PDF), USAID, December 1982, archived from the original (PDF) on February 8, 2017
- Burundi Structural Adjustment and Development Issues Background Papers (PDF), World Bank, 20 January 1988
- Decoudras, Pierre-Marie (1984), "Burundi : le problème des voies d'approvisionnement.", Cahiers d'outre-mer, 37 (147): 205–234, doi:10.3406/caoum.1984.3108
- John Veerkamp, "OTRACO", Bus Planet
- Madirisha, Edouard (5 February 2014), "L'Otraco veut garder le cap, mais perd de la vitesse", Iwacu (in French)
- Minutes of discussion on the bus maintenance station construction project in the Republic of Burundi (PDF), 2 October 1984
- Mwase, N. (February 1994), "The liberalization and de-regulation of the transport sector in Sub-Saharan Africa", International Journal of Transport Economics / Rivista internazionale di economia dei trasporti, 21 (1): 75–91, JSTOR 42747472
- Proposed development credit of SDR 64.9 million (PDF), International Development Association, 11 May 1988
- Rugamba, Alex; Wainaina, Stephen (3 August 1994), Transit transport systems in East and Central Africa: Issues, actions and constraints (PDF), UNCTAD
- The Burundian Economy: Current Situation and Institutional Constraints (PDF), World Bank, February 1981
- WT/TPR/S/113 Trade Policy Review, World Trade Organization
