= National Pharmaceutical Office =

Former company in Burundi

- Trade name: ONAPHA
- Native name: Office National Pharmaceutique
- Founded: 1980
- Defunct: 2012
- Owner: Government of Burundi

The National Pharmaceutical Office (Office National Pharmaceutique), or ONAPHA, was a public company that made pharmaceutical products in Burundi.

== History ==
ONAPHA was founded in 1980 under the Ministry of Health as a public enterprise that manufactured essential medicines for the local market and for export to neighboring countries. It was later transferred to the Ministry of Commerce and Finance.

In 1988 the government's Service in Charge of Public Enterprises was helping prepare a rehabilitation program for ONAPHA and other public companies (CADEBU, OTRACO, OTRABU and Verundi) to form the basis for performance contracts between the government and the companies. Most prices had been deregulated and the state-owned companies were expected to compete with private companies.

In 1992 ONAPHA was manufacturing about 48 products and supplied 25% of drugs used in Burundi. The Ministry of Health was its largest customer, spending 200 million BIF (67% of its budget for medicines) on ONAPHA products. It had outdated equipment and cramped premises, and was operating at 60% of its capacity. Bottles, metal cans and other packaging were imported by air. The government was seeking a buyer for the company.

ONAPHA was privatized in 2005. The State Privatisation Agency (Service chargé des entreprises publiques) organised privatisation of the company in a very transparent way. As of March 2012 the government was negotiating with the Société industrielle pharmaceutique du Burundi (SIPHAR), a group of Indian origin, to complete the sale of ONAPHA.

== See also ==
- List of companies of Burundi
- Economy of Burundi

== Sources ==
- Baer, Franklin; Brown, Judith; Brown, Richard; Lagace, Arthur; Murray, Thomas; Watt, Robert; Hersh, Bradley; Falkenberg, Giselle (January 1992), Burundi Health Sector Assessment (PDF), USAID, archived from the original (PDF) on February 21, 2017
- "Burundi: A deepening corruption crisis" (PDF), Africa Report, no. 185, International Crisis Group, 21 March 2012
- Burundi Structural Adjustment and Development Issues Background Papers (PDF), World Bank, 20 January 1988
- IMF Country Report No. 06/311 Burundi (PDF), International Monetary Fund, August 2006
