= Afritextile =

Burundian textile company

- Company type: Private company
- Industry: Textiles
- Predecessor: COTEBU
- Founded: 2010; 16 years ago
- Headquarters: Bujumbura, Burundi
- Afritextile Headquarters (Burundi)
- Website: www.afritextile.bi

Afritextile is a privately owned textile company based in Bujumbura, Burundi.

== Products ==
Afritextile manufactures and markets "kitenge" pagnes and cotton polyester products. It uses cotton produced in Burundi, or purchased in the sub-region, and polyester synthetic fiber. It has 1200 employees. Importation of pagnes to Burundi is prohibited on the grounds that Afritextile can produce enough to supply the domestic market.

== History ==
The state-owned COTEBU textile company closed down in 2006 and 2007, and dismissed almost 1,600 workers. In 2010 the government sold COTEBU's assets. Afri-Textile of Mauritius received a 30-year concession on the Burundi textile complex in exchange for an investment of US$10 million. All investments in the complex during the concession period would be property of the state.

Afritextile took over all COTEBU activities in July 2010. It began preparations to start industrial activities in 2011, and in April 2012 began production one workshop at a time. There are three workshops: spinning, weaving, and dyeing & printing. There is also a mechanical repair workshop that maintains and repairs the production machinery.

Production of cotton fiber at the state-owned cotton producer COGERCO fell from about 3,700 tonnes in 1971 to about 1,000 tonnes by 2018. In July 2018 about 500 of the 930+ Afritextile employees were sent on leave, since there was a shortage of cotton from COGERCO. As of 2021 COGERCO was selling cotton fiber to Afritextile and cotton seeds to the Rafina refinery. However, it could not meet the demands of either customer, who had to also import cotton fiber or seeds.

In August 2021 Déo Guide Rurema, Minister of Environment, Agriculture and Livestock, stated that COGERCO was making heavy losses. It was being audited, and then there would be talks with Afritextile to see how the two companies could work together in future. The company had a high level of debt and was unable to pay the dividends it owed to the state. The factory was dilapidated, and only one of the two cotton gins was working. Negotiations for a public-private partnership with Afritextile were underway.

In October 2021 the wives of the premiers of Burundi and Niger visited the Afritextile, Kaze Green Economy and FOMI factories. At Afritextile they saw the whole production process from receipt of raw cotton through spinning, weaving and printing/dying. In November 2023 Emmanuel Sinzohagera, president of the Senate, visited Afritextile. He was shown the different departments making pagnes and fabrics. He observed that the workers were well-provided with gloves and nose masks.

== See also ==
- List of companies of Burundi
- Economy of Burundi

== Sources ==
- "Afri-Textile de Maurice prend possession du COTEBU au Burundi", ARIB (in French)
- Barangenza, Laurent (29 June 2021), "La diplomatie économique figure parmi les priorités du Gouvernement du Burundi", Radio Télévision Nationale du Burundi (in French)
- Gakiza, Dorine (23 November 2023), Le Président du Sénat visite l'industrie Afritextile (in French)
- Historique (in French), Afritextile
- "La COGERCO, une entreprise en faillite", ABP (in French), 18 August 2021
- "La privatisation de Cotebu", RFI, 8 December 2010
- "Le Complexe Textile de Bujumbura sur la liste des entreprises a privatiser", arib.info (in French), 16 February 2009
- "Les premières dames du Burundi et du Niger visitent les usines Afritextile, FOMI et Kaze Green Economy", ABP (in French), 25 October 2021
- Majambere, Gustave (2021), Présentation sur les produits et sous-produits du coton au Burundi (PDF) (in French), COGERCO
- Maniragaba, Mélance (20 July 2018), "Afritextile : Les congés techniques inquiètent les consommateurs", Burundi Eco (in French)
- Niyongabo, Jean Marie Vianney (24 September 2021), "La Cogerco au bord de la faillite", Burundi Eco (in French)
