= OTRACO Burundi =

Public Transport Office
- Trade name: OTRACO
- Native name: Office des Transports en Commun
- Industry: Transport
- Founded: September 1985
- Headquarters: Bujumbura, Burundi
- Products: Vehicle Inspection and Public Transport
- OTRACO headquarters in Bujumbura (Burundi)

The Public Transport Office (French: Office des Transports en Commun), or OTRACO is a publicly owned enterprise that inspects vehicles and operates public transport in Burundi. It was founded in 1985.

== Business model ==
The Office de Transport en Commun (OTRACO) is a government office based in Bujumbura that is responsible for public transportation. It is also responsible for technical inspection of vehicles.

OTRACO has a fleet of buses that serve the city of Bujumbura and the interior of Burundi. There is a shortage of private bus companies in part because the poor quality of the road makes vehicle maintenance expensive, and in part because the public cannot afford high fares. Japan has assisted OTRACO by donating modern buses and by providing training.

== History ==
The state-owned Transport Board of Burundi (Office des Transports du Burundi, or OTRABU) was liquidated on 2 September 1991. It was succeeded in its bus business by OTRACO.

In September 2006 Jean Bosco Ntunzwenimana, Minister of Transport, said four buses would be allocated to the parking lots of Bujumbura, two in the south and two in the north, to help bus passengers find transport in the evenings.

In January 2010 OTRACO founded Otraco Burundi Express, which mostly operates in Burundi, Rwanda and Uganda. Burundi terminals were in Bujumbura, Gitega and Ngozi.

On 16 April 2016 the government of Burundi signed a Public-Private Partnership (PPP) agreement with Global Smart Technologies (GST) of Burundi for modernizing automobile technical inspection services and the granting of transport permits. An order to implement the project was signed in 2019.

In February 2017, following the introduction of new ways to prevent fraud, OTRACO was inspecting over 200 vehicles per day, whereas before there were only 20 to 25 vehicles per day. A deficit of 180 million BIF had been replaced by a profit of 200 million BIF. Long queues had been reported for vehicles waiting for inspection, but the CEO of OTRACA said a computerization system was being introduced that would reduce waiting times.

In August 2017 OTRACO announced that vehicle inspection fees would increase as of 1 September 2017. Fees for public transport vehicles would rise from 11,500 BIF to 35,000 BIF. Fees for private cars would rise from 8,100 BIF to 50,000 BIF. Fees for motorbikes would rise from 2,000 BIF to 10,000 BIF.

In June 2021, the President of Burundi suspended the CEO of OTRACO, who was accused of mismanagement and of dragging out changes to OTRACO operations. Shortcomings in the GST partnership were observed, and in June 2021 the accounts through which costs were processed were frozen.

In July 2021 Capitoline Niyonizigiye, Minister of Commerce, Transport, Industry and Tourism, launched the Technical Control Center for Vehicles and Motorcycles at the OTRACO agency in the Musinzira district of Gitega. Vehicle owners would no longer have to travel to Bujumbura Mairie for technical inspections. There were plans to establish inspection centers in Ngozi in the north, and in Bururi in the southwest.

In September 2021 the ministers of Finance and Transport were asked to review the contributions of each partner in the PPP agreement with GST and draw up a new contract that respected the win-win principle. They found that GST had overvalued its equipment and technical control software. Revenue allocation depended on the service, but it was estimated that GST would get 21.3%, with the remainder divided between OTRACO and OBR. In July 2023 the Council of Ministers approved lifting of the freeze. The new contract would last for three years and one month. When it expired, the OTRACO staff, trained by GST, would be able to operate the software.

Burundi Eco interviewed the new CEO of OTRACO at the company's premises in February 2023. They noted that technical inspection of vehicles was taking 45 minutes to an hour for new customers, and 30 minutes for returns customers, a real improvement. The CEO said financial management had also improved. A project was being tested by which customers could pay electronically for technical inspections. However, the owners of old buses used in public transport still failed to come to get their vehicles inspected.

In May 2024, Audace Niyonzima, Minister of Finance, Budget and Economic Planning, reported to the Senate on dividends paid by public and mixed enterprises. He noted that some public companies had never paid their dividends, including Onatel (National Telecommunications Office), Camebu (Central Medical Purchasing Agency), Cogerco (Cotton Management Company), Loterie Nationale du Burundi, Onatour, Otraco and the Hôtel Source du Nil. Some had recorded negative results, and others had not taken the required steps to calculate dividends.

== See also ==
- List of companies of Burundi

== Sources ==
- "About OTRACO", Africa2Trust
- "Burundi : Plus 4 bus de l'OTRACO le soir aux parkings à Bujumbura", AGnews, 7 September 2017
- Igiraneza, Jules Bercy (24 May 2024), "Les dividendes des entreprises publiques en débat au Sénat", Iwacu (in French)
- John Veerkamp, "OTRACO", Bus Planet
- "Lancement des activités du Centre de contrôle technique des véhicules et des motos à l'OTRACO de Gitega", ABP (in French), 12 July 2021
- L’OTRACO commence à travailler avec profit (in French), Agence BUJUMBURA News, 24 February 2017
- Ndikumana, Jonathan (13 February 2023), "Qualité des services publics : L'OTRACO tente de remonter la pente", Burundi Eco (in French)
- Niyibigira, Aline (13 July 2023), "Contrôle technique automobile : Clé de répartition des revenus entre les partenaires (GST, OTRACO et OBR)", Burundi Eco (in French)
- Niyungeko, Dorine (11 July 2023), "Le gouvernement burundais propose de nouvelles clauses entre l'OTRACO et la société Global Smart technologies", Iwacu (in French)
- OTRACO: Affordable Transport to the People, JICA
- Otraco Travel Sample, Keza Store
- Uwimana, Diane (23 August 2017), "Price of technical inspection of vehicles to be increased", Iwacu
- WT/TPR/S/113 Trade Policy Review, World Trade Organization
