= Socabu =

Insurance Company of Burundi
- Trade name: Socabu
- Native name: Société d’Assurances du Burundi
- Founded: 29 June 1977; 49 years ago in Bujumbura, Burundi
- Headquarters: Bujumbura, Burundi
- Socabu Headquarters (Burundi)
- Website: socabu-assurances.com/socabu/

The Insurance Company of Burundi (French: Société d’Assurances du Burundi, Socabu) is an insurance company in Burundi. It dominates the markets for life and non-life insurance.

== Foundation ==
Socabu was created by decree n°100/61 of 29 June 1977, and issued its first insurance policy in October 1977. When it was founded, Socabu had a monopoly on selling insurance in Burundi. It was launched with a staff of 21 agents. The state owned 90% and the private companies Boels & Bégault and EIC of Belgium owned 10%.

== History ==
In 1985 the state reduced its stake to 50%, with public and private banks, financial institutions and other companies acquiring the rest of its shares. The company ended its reliance on expatriate managers from Boels & Bégault in 1985. In 1989 the state reduced its shares to 25%, selling its other 25% to companies.

As of 2009 Socabu dominated the life and non-life insurance markets in Burundi, which was growing rapidly. It had 173 employees and two agencies. The National Postal Administration gave it a presence throughout Burundi.

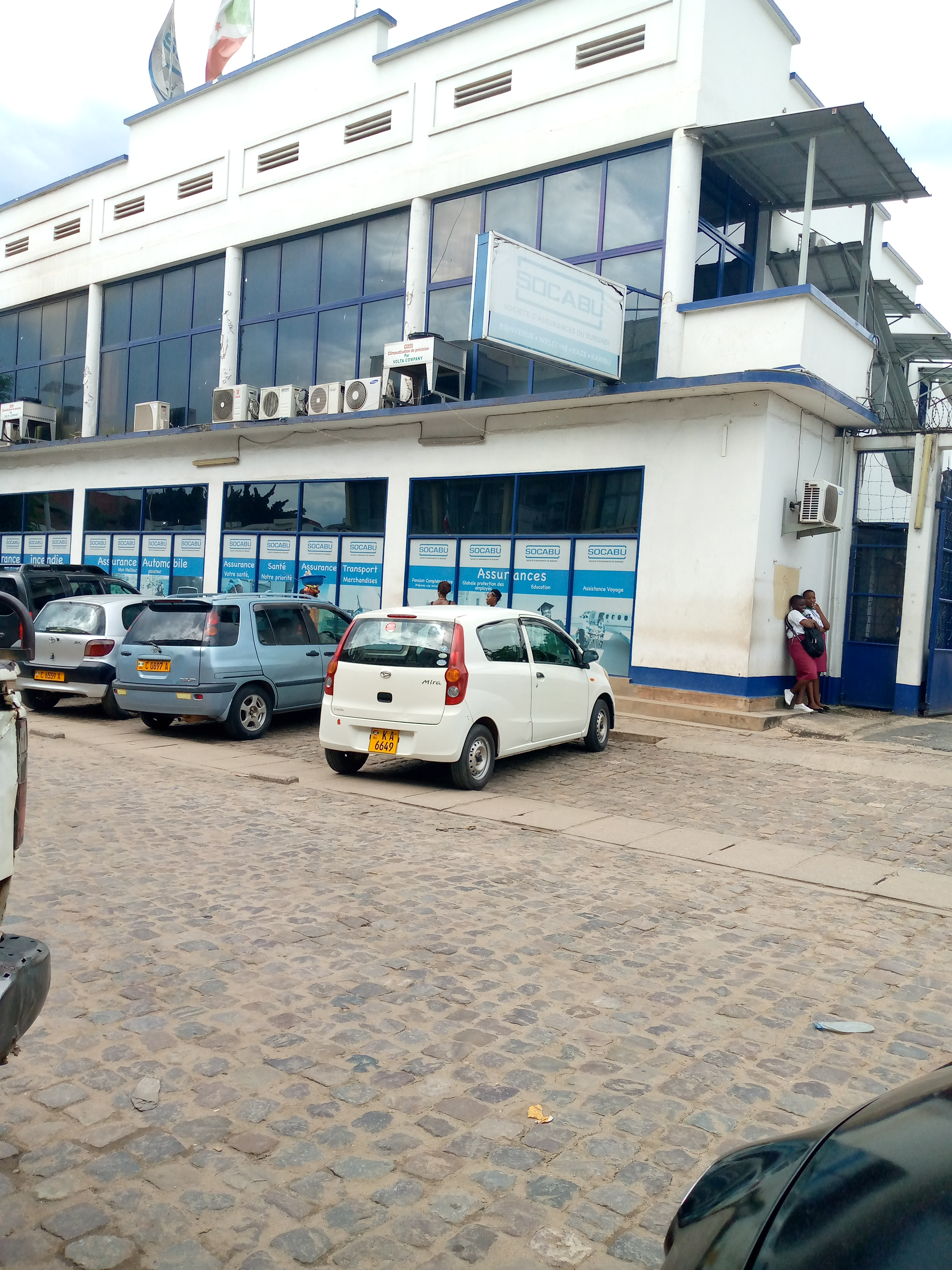
Headquarters of Socabu in Bujumbura

Planning for building a modern, well-equipped hospital in Bujumbura began in 2011. A group of doctors obtained support from Suiss Made International and Lamelec, two Swiss companies that provided 40% and 20% respectively of the capital, and Socabu with another 20%. The Minister of Public Works, Saidi Kibeya, laid the foundation stone of Kira Hospital on 29 June 2011. In 2023 the auditor refused to report on the shareholding structure at the general meeting because it did not match the balance sheets, which had to match investment.

As of December 2022, owners with over 10% were:

25.00% State of Burundi
16.67% Ecobank (private)
11.11% Ocibu (in liquidation, mixed)
9.31% Interbank Burundi (mixed)

In 2022, Socabu had plans to separate its Life and Non-Life operations into two separate companies. As of 2024 it had three public offices in Bujumbura, and public offices in Gitega, Ngozi and Makamba. Socabu owned 19.22% of the share capital of Bancobu, the Commercial Bank of Burundi.

== See also ==
- List of companies of Burundi
- Economy of Burundi

== Sources ==
- A Propos (in French), Kira Hospital
- "About SOCABU", Africa2Trust
- Burundi: Kira Hospital, voie du salut pour des milliers de malades africains (in French), Agence Anadolu (Turkey), 15 April 2015
- "Descente aux enfers de l'hôpital KIRA SWISS CLINIC", Radio Publique Africaine (in French), 31 August 2023
- Historique de la Bancobu (in French), Bancobu
- Nos Agences (in French), Socabu
- Rapport annuel 2022 (PDF) (in French), Socabu, May 2023
- SOCABU, Atlas Magazine, May 2011
- Urakeza, Cédric-Soledad (11 July 2011), "Kira Hospital : tout soigner au Burundi", Iwacu (in French)
