= BBAB =

BBAB may refer to:

- Banque Belgo-Africaine du Burundi, a bank in Burundi
- ↑↓←→BBAB, a song by Metal Galaxy
