= Afra Airways =

Airline of Burundi

Afra Airways Africa
- Founded: 2016
- Hubs: Bujumbura International Airport
- Headquarters: Bujumbura
- Key people: Manuel Pereira (CEO)
- Website: afraair.bi

Afra Airways is an airline based in Burundi, that plans to operate flights out of Bujumbura International Airport by the end of 2016. The airline received an Air Services Licence in April 2016 but at that time had not been awarded an air operator's certificate. The airline plans to operate ERJ 145s and Bombardier CRJ200 aircraft to nearby destinations. The airlines first destination is planned to be Kigali.

As of 2026 the airline has still yet to launch any flights.

== History ==
Afra Airways registered in Burundi on 15 April 2016 as a commercial passenger airline in Bujumbura. The airline was founded by Manuel Pereira who is the founder of the Spanish company Emitur S.A.

== See also ==
- Transport in Burundi
- List of companies of Burundi
- Economy of Burundi
