= Rafina (Burundi) =

Cottonseed oil company

- Founded: 1963; 63 years ago
- Headquarters: Bujumbura, Burundi
- Rafina Headquarters (Burundi)

Rafina (French: Raffinage des produits agricoles) is a company based in Bujumbura, Burundi, that manufactures cottonseed oil.

== Products ==
Rafina uses cotton oil seeds from COGERCO to produce:

- cottonseed oil for human consumption
- oilcake for animal feed. This has become increasingly important with the policy of permanent stabling of all livestock
- cotton substrates, a very fertile environment for cultivation of edible mushrooms
- cotton bark for use as fuel

Byproducts are also sold to manufacturers of cotton cushions and mattresses, soap manufacturers such as Savonor, and manufacturers of combustible bricks.

== History ==
=== Early years ===
Rafina had its origins in HUILUSA (Huilerie d’Usimbura), created in 1951, owned by a Belgian group. After several changes of name and ownership, it became RAFINA through 1963 legislation. Until 1985, the original Belgian managers remained with the company. Later the company was bought by individuals with 3,000 shares for a share capital of US$300,000. 51% were nationals of Burundi and 49% were foreigners. As a private company, Rafina keeps its costs to the minimum.

Rafina had the capacity to crush 15,000 tons of seeds per growing season, but has never used more than a small part of this potential. Rafina was intended to process and refine oilseeds such as soybeans, peanuts, sunflowers and cotton seeds, and to market the oils and by-products. In practice, state-provided cotton seed from COGERCO became its only commercial input. COGERCO's cotton gin separated fiber, sent to the textile company COTEBU, from seed, which accounted for about 54% by weight. Around 10% of the seed was retained for sowing cotton, and the remainder was blown through a seed transport pipe to RAFINA.

=== Later difficulties ===
Production at the state-owned cotton producer COGERCO fell by about 70% between 1971 and 2018. Between 1991 and 2006 Rafina cut its staff from 57 to 28. After 1998, Rafina had to import cotton seed from Tanzania at considerably higher prices than those charged by COGERCO. This affected the price of its oil, which became less competitive compared to imported oil or locally produced palm oil.

After 2007, the seeds were stored by COGERCO, some sold to cattle breeders and the rest sold to Rafina after negotiation. In the 2017–2018 season, COGERCO expected to extract 1,300 tonnes of cotton seeds to be sold to Rafina. As of 2021 COGERCO was selling cotton fiber to Afritextile and cotton seeds to the Rafina refinery. However, it could not meet the demands of either customer, who had to also import cotton fiber or seeds.

Rafina's coottonseed oil was never produced in sufficient quantities to meet domestic demand. As of 2008 Rafina's production of oilcake was 700 to 900 tonnes per year, of which 80% was used in poultry feed and 20% for cattle feed. At first Rafina sold the oilcake to the state-owned breeding company, linked to a national dairy. As these were closed, the cakes were sold to private farms around Bujumbura.

Rafina's factory is increasingly vulnerable to flooding from the Ntahangwa River.

== See also ==
- List of companies of Burundi
- Economy of Burundi

== Sources ==
- Gahungu, Antoine (2012), Dynamique et perspectives de la filiere cotonniere du Burundi (PDF) (thesis) (in French), Université de Liège – Gembloux Agro-bio Tech
- Gihimbare, Arthémon; Ndabirorere, Salvator; Ruzimi, Salvator (August 2011), Etude sur les coûts de l’inaction contre la dégradation des sols au Burundi (PDF) (in French), Bujumbura: Ministere de l’eau, de l’environnement, de l’amenagement du territoire et de l’urbanisme
- Kurubone, Alfred (23 July 2018), "La COGERCO s'attend à une production de coton fibre de 1000 tonnes", Radio Télévision Nationale du Burundi (in French)
- Majambere, Gustave (2021), Présentation sur les produits et sous-produits du coton au Burundi (PDF) (in French), COGERCO
- Maniragaba, Mélance (20 July 2018), "Afritextile : Les congés techniques inquiètent les consommateurs", Burundi Eco (in French)
- Sebushahu, Tharcisse (October 2008), Poultry sector country review, Bujumbura: FAO
