= Interbank Burundi =

Commercial bank (founded 1993)

- Company type: Private
- Industry: Banking
- Founded: 1993
- Headquarters: 15 Avenue de l'Industrie, Bujumbura, Burundi
- Key people: Gaspard Sindayigaya (Chairman); Nadia Uwaliraye Uwineza (Chief Executive Officer)
- Products: Loans, Savings, Transaction account, Investments, Debit Cards, Credit Cards
- Revenue: ▲BIF:3.7 billion (US$2.4 million) (2013)
- Total assets: BIF:304.56 billion (US$198 million) (2013)
- Website: www.interbankbdi.bi

Interbank Burundi, often called Interbank, is a commercial bank in Burundi. It is licensed by the Bank of the Republic of Burundi, the national banking regulator.

The bank is a medium-sized financial services provider in Burundi, serving both individuals and businesses. As of April 2016, Interbank was the second largest commercial bank in Burundi, with a market-share of 25%. As of 31 December 2013, the bank's total assets were valued at 304.56 billion BIF (approx. US$198 million), with shareholders' equity of 36.34 billion BIF (approx. US$23.6 million).

== History ==
The bank was founded in 1993 by citizens and non-citizens of Burundi, representing over ten nationalities.

== Branch network ==
As of December 2013, Interbank Burundi has a network of branches in Bujumbura (the largest city and former capital of Burundi) and in the provinces. Some of the locations where the bank maintains branches include the following:

1. Main Branch – 15 Avenue de l'Industrie, Bujumbura
2. Marché Central Branch – Avenue d'Allemagne, Bujumbura
3. Quartier Asiatique Branch – Avenue Ntahangwa, Bujumbura
4. Place de l'Indépendance Branch – Avenue du Commerce, Bujumbura
5. Market Branch = Bujumbura Central Market, Avenue de la Croix-Rouge, Bujumbura
6. Buyenzi Branch – 20th Avenue, Bujumbura
7. Jabe Branch – Avenue de la Jeunesse, Bujumbura
8. Ngozi Branch – RNG Road, Ngozi
9. Kirundo Branch – Kirundo
10. Gitega Branch – Gitega
11. Muyinga Branch – Muyinga
12. Makamba Branch – Makamba
13. Rumonge Branch - Rumonge
14. Kayanza Branch - Kayanza
15. Bubanza Branch - Bubanza
16. Masanganzira Branch - Masanganzira
17. Ruyigi Branch - Ruyigi
18. Cankuzo Branch - Cankuzo
19. Mabanda Branch - Mabanda

== See also ==
- List of companies of Burundi
- List of banks in Burundi
- Bank of the Republic of Burundi
- Economy of Burundi
