= List of companies of Burundi =

Location of Burundi

The Republic of Burundi is a landlocked country in the African Great Lakes region of Southeast Africa.

During the colonial period most large companies were owned and run by Europeans, and operated under concessions from the colonial government. After independence in 1962, the state took over operations of several of the companies. Subsequently the state founded a number of state-owned companies to handle specific sectors of the economy, such as sugar, cotton, textiles, cement, brewing and so on. Later, the state sold part or all of their stake in these companies, but retained the right to control the products or services they offered, and to set prices.

== Notable firms ==
This list includes notable companies with primary headquarters located in the country. The industry and sector follow the Industry Classification Benchmark taxonomy. Organizations which have ceased operations are included and noted as defunct.

Notable companies Status: P=Private, S=State; A=Active, D=Defunct
Name	Industry	Sector	Headquarters	Founded	Notes	Status	
Afra Airways	Consumer services	Airlines	Bujumbura	2016		P	A
African Mining Burundi	Mining	Gold	Butihinda	2018	Public-private. Defunct in 2021	P	D
Africell Burundi	Telecommunications	Mobile services	Bujumbura	2000	Closed in 2015	P	D
Afritextile	Consumer goods	Textiles	Bujumbura	2010		P	A
Agence de Location du Matériel	Transport	Road equipment		2001	Merged in 2019	P	D
Air Burundi	Consumer services	Airlines	Bujumbura	1971	State airline, defunct 2009	S	D
ARNOLAC	Transport	Merchant shipping	Bujumbura	1969		P	A
Bancobu	Financials	Banks	Bujumbura	1960		P	A
Bank of the Republic of Burundi	Financials	Banks	Bujumbura	1966	Central bank	S	A
Banque de commerce et de développement	Financials	Banks	Bujumbura	1999	State owned, defunct 2004	S	D
Banque de Gestion et de Financement	Financials	Banks	Bujumbura	1996		P	A
BATRALAC	Transport	Cargo shipping	Bujumbura	1988		P	A
Belgo-African Bank of Burundi	Financials	Banks		1949	Defunct 1988	P	D
BeTV	Consumer services	Television	Bujumbura	2017		P	A
Brarudi Brewery	Consumer goods	Brewers	Bujumbura	1955	Brewery	P	A
Bujumbura Credit Bank	Finance	Banks	Bujumbura	1964	Commercial bank	P	A
Burundi Airlines	Consumer services	Airlines	Bujumbura	2021		P	A
Burundi Backbone System	Telecommunications	Telecommunications Services	Bujumbura	2010		P	A
Burundi Cement Company	Industrials	Cement	Cibitoke	2008		P	A
Burundi Musongati Mining	Basic Materials	Nickel mining	Musongati	2014	Public-private partnership. Revoked in 2022	P	D
Burundi Tea Office	Consumer goods	Tea	Bujumbura	1971		S	A
Burundi Tobacco Company	Consumer goods	Tobacco	Bujumbura	1979		P	A
Burundi National Radio and Television	Consumer services	Broadcasting & entertainment	Bujumbura	1975	State media	S	A
Burundian Bank for Commerce and Investment	Financial services	Banking	Bujumbura	1988	Public-private	S	A
CADEBU	Finance	Savings and loans	Bujumbura	1964	Failed in 1992	S	D
CAMEBU	Health care	Medicine and other supplies	Bujumbura	2000		S	A
CAMOFI	Finance	Development bank	Bujumbura	1977	State owned, defunct in 1998	S	D
CECM (Burundi)	Finance	Microcredit	Bujumbura	1995		P	A
Centre Burundais de l'Internet	Telecommunications	Internet access	Bujumbura	1999		P	A
City Connexion Airlines	Consumer services	Airlines	Bujumbura	1998	Airline, defunct 2000	P	D
COFIDE	Financial	Microfinance	Ngozi	2000		P	A
COGERCO	Textile Products	Cotton	Bujumbura	1947		S	A
COMEBU	Mining	Coltan	Kabarore	1987		P	A
COOPEC	Finance	Microfinance		1984	Generic name for many small banks	P	A
COSPEC	Finance	Microfinance	Cibitoke Province	2001		P	A
COTEBU	Consumer goods	Textiles	Bujumbura	1978	Defunct 2006	S	D
CRDB Bank Burundi	Financials	Banks	Bujumbura	2012		P	A
Econet Wireless Burundi	Telecommunications	Mobile services	Bujumbura	2009		P	A
FinBank Burundi	Financials	Banks	Bujumbura	2002	Commercial bank	P	A
FOMI	Organo‑mineral fertilizers	Agriculture	Mutimbuzi Zone	2019		P	A
Global Port Services Burundi	Transport	Port Management	Port of Bujumbura	2012	Majority government-owned	S	A
Imbo Regional Development Company	Consumer goods	Rice, cotton etc,		1973		S	A
Interbank Burundi	Financials	Banks	Bujumbura	1993	Commercial bank	P	A
Interpetrol	Energy	Petrol	Bujumbura	1990s		P	A
Hôtel Source du Nil	Consumer services	Hotels	Bujumbura	1979	State-owned	S	A
Laboratoire Nationale du Bâtiment et des Travaux Publics	Industrials	Engineering and Contracting Services	Bujumbura	1982	Merged in 2019	S	D
Lacell SU Burundi	Telecommunications	Mobile service	Bujumbura	2008	Defunct in 2022	P	D
Loterie Nationale du Burundi	Consumer services	Gambling	Bujumbura	1989		S	A
LOVINCO	Consumer goods	Blankets	Bujumbura	1952	Defunct in 2004	P	D
Lumitel	Telecommunications	Mobile services	Bujumbura	2013		P	A
Kaze Green Economy	Consumer goods	Charcoal	Bujumbura	2017		P	A
KCB Bank Burundi Limited	Financials	Banks	Bujumbura	2012	Commercial bank	P	A
Meridien Bank Burundi	Financials	Banks	Bujumbura	1988	Defunct in 1995	P	D
National Bank for Economic Development	Finance	Banking	Bujumbura	1967		P	A
National Pharmaceutical Office	Consumer goods	Medicine		1980		S	D
Office des Transports du Burundi	Transport	Buses		1985	State owned	S	D
Office Pharmaceutique Vétérinaire	Consumer Staples	Veterinary products		1986	State owned	S	D
Onatel Burundi	Telecommunications	Telecommunications Services	Bujumbura	1978	State owned	S	A
ONATOUR	Energy	Peat	Bujumbura	1977	State owned	S	A
OTRACO	Transport	Buses, vehicle inspection	Bujumbura		State owned	S	A
Public Real Estate Company	Industrials	Construction		1979	State owned, defunct	S	D
Rafina	Consumer Staples	Food Products	Bujumbura	1963	Cottonseed oil producer	P	A
Rainbow Mining Burundi	Mining	Rare earths	Bujumbura	2015	Defunct 2021	P	D
REGIDESO Burundi	Utilities	Multi-utilities	Bujumbura	1962	Power and water	S	A
Régie Nationale des Postes	Industrials	Delivery services	Bujumbura	1991	Postal services	P	A
Royal Air Burundi	Consumer services	Airlines	Bujumbura	1962	Airline, defunct 1963	P	D
Savonor	Consumer products	Soap, oil	Bujumbura	1970	Hygiene, food and cosmetic products	P	A
SEP Burundi	Energy	Petrol storage	Bujumbura	1967		P	A
Socabu	Financials	Insurance	Bujumbura	1977		P	A
SODECO	Consumer products	Coffee	Bujumbura	1991	Public-private, state over 80%	S	A
SOGEAB	Consumer staples	Abattoir	Bujumbura	2010		P	A
SOPEBU	Energy	Petrol import and distribution	Bujumbura	2024		S	A
SOSUMO	Consumer goods	Sugar	Gihofi	1982		S	A
Twitezimbere Microfinance	Financial	Microfinance	Bujumbura	2013		S	A
Tanganyika Mining Burundi	Basic Materials	Gold Mining	Gihofi	2017	Public-private partnership	P	A
U-COM Burundi	Telecommunications	Mobile services	Bujumbura	1985		P	A
Union Commerciale d'Assurances et de Réassurance	Financial services	Insurance	Bujumbura	1986		P	A
Verundi	Consumer goods	Glass bottles	Bujumbura		State-owned, defunct in 1993	S	D
Women's Investment and Development Bank	Financials	Banking	Gitega	2022		S	A

== See also ==
- List of banks in Burundi
- Economy of Burundi
