= CADEBU =

Caisse d'épargne du Burundi
- Trade name: CADEBU
- Industry: Finance
- Founded: 1964
- Defunct: 1992
- Headquarters: Bujumbura, Burundi
- Owner: Government of Burundi

The Caisse d'épargne du Burundi (Burundi Savings Bank), or CADEBU, was a public company that managed mandatory savings in Burundi. It collapsed in 1992 after competition was introduced.

== History ==
The Caisse d'épargne du Burundi (CADEBU) was founded in 1964 as a state-owned financial institution. During the Ikiza mass killings in 1972, the government seized the CADEBU accounts of most prosperous Hutus. By 1976 it was on the brink of bankruptcy.

CADEBU was saved when a compulsory savings scheme was introduced in May 1976. Under this scheme, 5% of the salaries of all public and private sector workers was withheld at source for deposit with CADEBU, which held the savings for three years. At the end of this period civilians could withdraw deposits made in the first year, while armed forces personnel could withdraw the full amount. Any form of business had to get a Carte de Commerce (business permit) to get basic access to the formal sector. One of the requirements was deposit of at least 5,000 BIF with CADEBU. From October 1987 farmers no longer had to participate.

CADEBU lent out the savings at relatively low interest loans to individuals and private companies. There was competition for these loans, and the managers sometimes awarded them based on political pressure or favoritism rather than based on merit. A January 1988 World Bank report said that "Profits as stated in the annual report are probably fictitious, the accumulated losses may well exceed 10 percent of the deposits, and the capital remains insufficient."

Although in principle the commercial banks competed with CADEBU for public and private sector deposits, in practice the compulsory savings plan meant that CADEBU got more than 80% of individual savings. From 1986 CADEBU participated in financing the coffee campaign. As of 1988 CADEBU had ten branches.

== Collapse ==
In the late 1980s the financial sector was liberalized, and CADEBU lost some of its privileges. Due to a combination of poor management (Note: The first deputy general of the central bank stated in her 10 October 2003 communication that CADEBU and CAMOFI had collapsed due to "gestion laxiste" (lax management), but it would be more accurate to say that they were plundered.) and competition, it collapsed in 1992.

The ruling elite had treated state enterprises such as CADEBU as sources of rents. The managers, their friends, and politically connected people with large loans may have benefitted from the failure. The assets, mostly real estate, were quickly repossessed and sold through opaque processes by the liquidators. Twenty years later, little progress had been made in recovering the loans. CADEBU was just one of the state-owned companies that failed due to poor management. Others were COTEBU, Verundi, Meridien Bank, Onapha, ORABU, OCIBU and Air Burundi.

== See also ==
- List of companies of Burundi
- Economy of Burundi

== Sources ==
- Kwizera, Emery (12 April 2024), "Pénuries répétitives : « L'Etat est un mauvais gestionnaire », dixit l'Olucome", Iwacu (in French)
- Nkurunziza, Janvier D.; Ndikumana, Léonce; Nyamoya, Prime (June 2010), The Financial Sector in Burundi (PDF), NBER Africa Project
- Report No. 6754-BU Structural Adjustment and Development Issues (PDF), World Bank, 20 January 1988
- The small and medium enterprise sector in Burundi (PDF), USAID, July 1989, archived from the original (PDF) on February 21, 2017
- Weinstein, Warren (1976), Historical Dictionary of Burundi, Metuchen: Scarecrow Press, ISBN 9780810809628
