= Banque Commerciale du Burundi =

Commercial Bank of Burundi
- Trade name: Bancobu
- Native name: Banque Commerciale du Burundi
- Founded: 13 June 1960; 66 years ago in Bujumbura, Burundi
- Headquarters: 84 Chaussée PL Rwagasore, Bujumbura, Burundi
- Key people: Trinitas Girukwishaka, CEO
- Bancobu Headquarters (Burundi)
- Website: www.bancobu.com

The Commercial Bank of Burundi (French: Banque commerciale du Burundi, Bancobu) is a bank in Burundi. It was established on 13 June 1960. As of 2023, it had the widest bank coverage in the country, with 49 branches and over 537,000 customers.

== Foundation and ownership ==
The Commercial Bank of Burundi (Bancobu) was established on 13 June 1960. Its predecessors were the Banque Belge du Congo and the Société Congolaise de Banque. Banque Bruxelles Lambert, and from 1998 ING Belgium, held up to 49% of Bancobu. These shares were bought in 2004 by Burundian shareholders. As of 2024, the share capital of Bancobu was represented by 1,144,724 shares, divided as follows:

Private	Public	Socabu	INSS
44,32%	23.21%	19.22%	13.25%

== Events ==
In August 2012 Bancobu announced their Mobicash app for mobile phone users to securely pay bills, transfer or withdraw money at any time. The service was provided in collaboration with the mobile operator Onatel Burundi.

In July 2020 Bancobu had run out of checkbooks, after import of the type of paper needed to make the checkbooks stopped due to coronavirus.

In August 2020 Trinitas Girukwishaka replaced Gaspard Sindayigaya as managing director. Trinitas Girukwishaka was the wife of businessman Vénérand Kazohera. In January 2022 it emerged that Kazohera's Intertrade-Kazohera-Tradeco Group, which was supplying equipment to the Ministry of Defense and Ministry of Public Security, had borrowed large amounts from the bank. The Bank of the Republic of Burundi (BRB) told Bancobu that it had violated the legal and regulatory provisions that govern banking practices by granting so much credit to one individual.

As of 2023 the bank had more than 537,000 customers. Its balance sheet was about US$556 million. With headquarters in Bujumbura, it had 400 employees and 49 branches, and gave the widest bank coverage in the country. In April 2023 the African Development Bank approved a trade finance transaction guarantee facility to Bancobu, which would support SMEs in financing exports and imports.

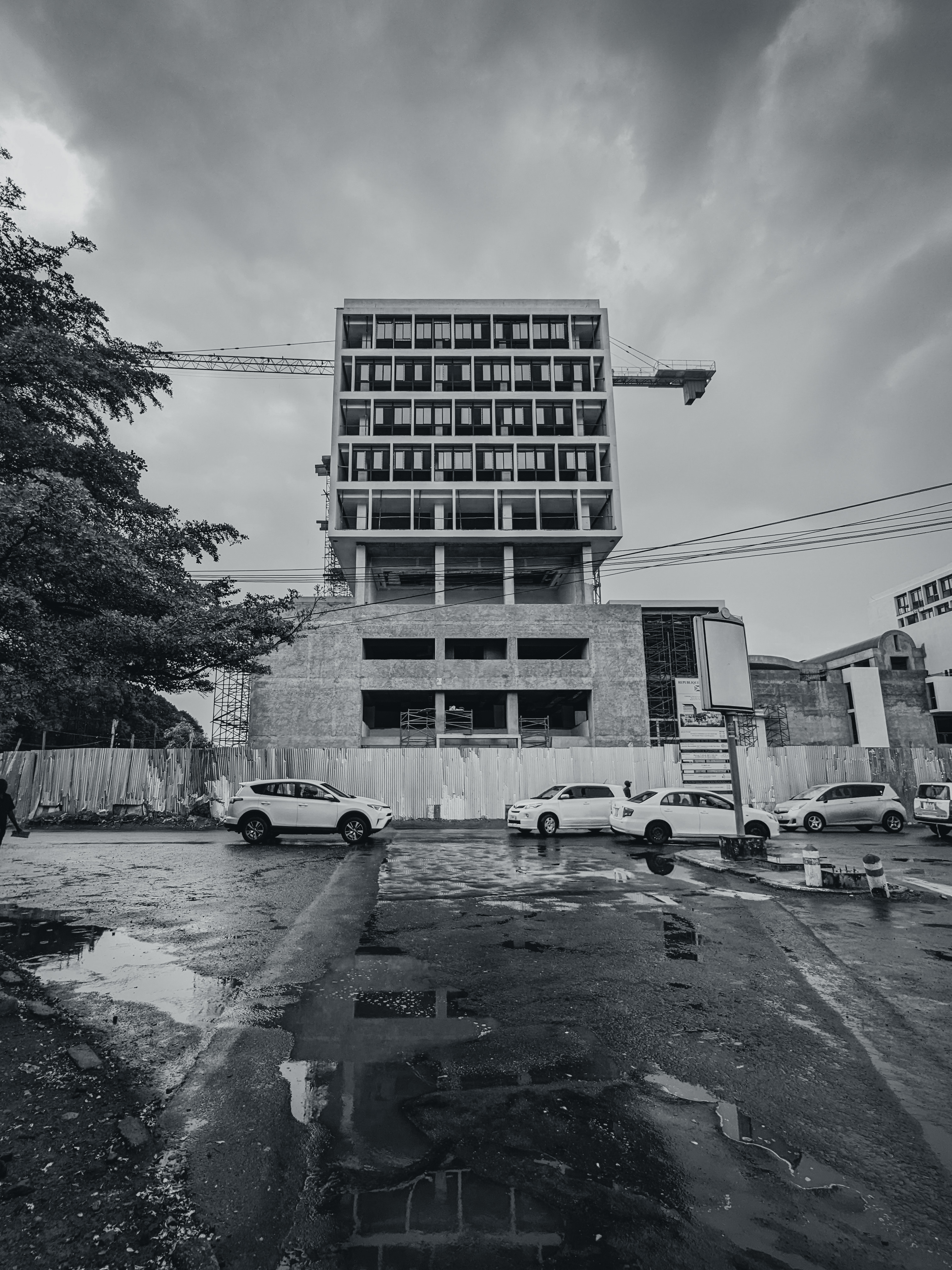
A view of the new Bancobu Business Center under construction in Bujumbura

== See also ==
- Economy of Burundi
- List of companies of Burundi
- List of banks in Burundi

== Sources ==
- BANCOBU unveils mobile banking service, MFW4A, 12 August 2012
- Burundi: African Development Bank approves trade finance transaction guarantee facility to Banque Commerciale Du Burundi (Bancobu), ADB, 14 April 2023
- "BURUNDI : Remise et Reprise à la BANCOBU entre SINDAYIGAYA et GIRUKWISHAKA", AGnews (in French), 28 August 2020
- Historique de la Bancobu (in French), Bancobu
- Manirakiza, Fabrice; Yikeze, Alphonse (28 January 2022), "BRB vs Bancobu : Le grand déballage", Iwacu (in French)
- "Manque de chéquiers à la Bancobu depuis près de 3 mois", Radio Publique Africaine (in French), 16 July 2020
