= COGERCO =

Cotton Management Company
- Trade name: COGERCO
- Native name: Compagnie de Gérance du Coton
- Founded: 1947; 79 years ago
- Headquarters: Burundi

The Cotton Management Company (French: Compagnie de Gérance du Coton, COGERCO), is a state-owned cotton company in Bujumbura, Burundi. It was established in 1947 to manage cotton cultivation and took over processing and marketing functions in 1977.

== Background ==
The Belgian colonial regime introduced cotton cultivation to Burundi in the 1920s in the Imbo natural region at altitudes of 800–1,100 metres (2,600–3,600 ft). Cotton was considered the most import export crop after coffee. In 1924, Law No. 52 compelled each family to grow 10–15 acres (4.0–6.1 ha) of cotton. This was increased in 1935 to 40 acres (16 ha) for a married person and 20 acres (8.1 ha) for a single person. In the 1950s research in the Moso natural region began in the Ruyigi and Rutana prefectures. Yields were low and transport to Bujumbura for processing would be expensive, so the trials were soon abandoned.

== Early years ==
COGERCO was established in 1947 as the Cotton Reserves Management Committee (Comité de Gérance des Réserves Cotonnières) to serve the Belgian Congo, Rwanda and Burundi. The Congo withdrew in 1961 and Rwanda in 1967. COGERCO concentrated on collection and popularization of Burundian cotton seed. The industrial and commercial functions were handled by RUZIZI, a private company. RUZIZI was nationalized in 1977, and COGERCO took over the processing and marketing functions.

COGERCO arranged for cotton to be planted, grown and harvested. COGERCO's cotton gin separated fiber, sent to the textile company COTEBU, from seed, which accounted for about 54% by weight. Around 10% of the seed was retained for propagation of cotton, and the remainder was blown through a seed transport pipe to Rafina, which made cottonseed oil and other products. COTEBU used the fiber to produce cotton textiles, and won first place in an industry competition in Madrid, Spain, in 1982. COGERCO also delivered fiber to smaller companies included the UPC factory which manufactured medical wadding, gauze bandages and sanitary napkins, Quami Freres, which manufactured sewing thread for clothing workshops and LOVINCO, which produced and marketed blankets.

Decree-Law No. 100/81 of 19 June 1984 changed the name of COGERCO to Compagnie de Gérance du Coton (Cotton Management Company) and made it a state-owned industriel and commercial establishment to promote cultivation of cotton, support cotton producers, process cotton seed into cotton fiber and market the fiber and its derivatives. An American "Continental Eagle" plant was purchased in 1987, capable of processing 120 tonnes of cotton seed per day.

Trials in the Moso region were revived in the 1980s when the government, looking for new sources of foreign exchange, asked COGERCO and the Institute of Agronomic Sciences of Burundi (ISABU) to again study the cotton potential of Moso. Trials were conducted in the Makamba, Rutana and Ruyigi provinces at altitudes of 1,100–1,400 metres (3,600–4,600 ft). Based on results, COGERCO cautiously launched commercial cotton growing in Rutana in 1985. Some cotton was grown by farmers on their land, and some was grown on land owned by COGERCO. Cotton production peaked in 1993 when 27,000 producers supplied 8,813 tonnes of cotton bolls, yielding 3,500 tonnes of fiber.

== Decline ==
With the political crisis of 1993 the cotton crop was gradually abandoned by farmers, and replaced by more profitable food crops. Quantities of textile produced by COTEBU dropped from 10,579,591 metres (34,709,944 ft) in 1989 to 4,901,301 metres (16,080,384 ft) in 1993. 4,838,907 metres (15,875,679 ft) were produced in 2000, rising to 7,264,798 metres (23,834,639 ft) in 2005. COTEBU closed down in 2006 and 2007, and dismissed almost 1,600 workers. Its successor, Afritextile, was launched that year.

In November 2014 the general manager of Cogerco said annual cotton production was now rarely more than 2,300 tonnes. After the 1993 crisis, large parts of Cogerco's cotton reserves were taken for other purposes, and the area of Cogerco reserves and peasant farms used for cotton had dropped from 8,000 to 2,000 hectares (19,800 to 4,900 acres). Farmers preferred to grow food stocks, which were worth much more than cotton.

In September 2015 the international price of cotton had dropped significantly. Cogerco continued to lose land, with most of the remaining cotton grown in Cibitoke Province. Afritextile sometimes delayed their purchase of cotton, causing cash flow problems. Lack of electricity was a serious problem for their factory. Cogerco was also negotiating with Rafina. Rafina refined the seeds to make cottonseed oil, oilcakes, and mushroom fertilizer.

2,500 tonnes of seed were produced in 2018, but in 2019 and 2020 there was heavy flooding, and yields were 873 and 777 tonnes of seed. Cogerco produced 1,010 tonnes of cotton during the 2020-2021 growing season. As of 2021 the "Continental Eagle" was COGERCO's only plant, now supported by Bajaj Steels Industries of Nagpur, India. COGERCO was selling cotton fiber to Afritextile and cotton seeds to the Rafina refinery. However, it could not meet the demands of either customer, who had to also import cotton fiber or seeds.

In August 2021 Déo Guide Rurema, Minister of Environment, Agriculture and Livestock, stated that COGERCO was making heavy losses. It was being audited, and then there would be talks with Afritextile to see how the two companies could work together in future. The company had a high level of debt and was unable to pay the dividends it owed to the state. The factory was dilapidated, and only one of the two cotton gins was working. Negotiations for a public-private partnership with Afritextile were underway.

In September 2021 the general manager of Cogerco said the company would promote growth of food crops beside the cotton to ensure adequate supplies of food. Corn, soybeans and dwarf beans had been tested. They had to be planted carefully to avoid crowding out the cotton.

== See also ==
- List of companies of Burundi
- Economy of Burundi

== Sources ==
- Gahungu, Antoine (2012), Dynamique et perspectives de la filiere cotonniere du Burundi (PDF) (thesis) (in French), Université de Liège – Gembloux Agro-bio Tech
- "La COGERCO, une entreprise en faillite", ABP (in French), 18 August 2021
- "Le Complexe Textile de Bujumbura sur la liste des entreprises a privatiser", arib.info (in French), 16 February 2009
- "Les friperies déstabilisent l'industrie textile", Burundi Eco (in French), 19 November 2021
- Majambere, Gustave (2021), Présentation sur les produits et sous-produits du coton au Burundi (PDF) (in French), COGERCO
- Misigaro, Ezechiel (23 September 2021), "Cogerco : Vers la promotion de l'association des cultures vivrières avec le coton pour plus de sécurité alimentaire", Le Renouveau (in French)
- Ndabashinze, Rénovat (18 November 2014), "La Cogerco peine à se relever", Iwacu (in French)
- Ndabashinze, Rénovat (18 October 2017), "Les planteurs de coton se plaignent", Iwacu (in French)
- Nyandwi, Salvator NYANDWI (2013), Analyse des déterminants de la faillite des entreprises publiques burundaises: cas du Complexe Textile de Bujumbura (COTEBU) (in French), Institut supérieur de gestion des entreprises
- Niyongabo, Jean Marie Vianney (24 September 2021), "La Cogerco au bord de la faillite", Burundi Eco (in French)
- Shaka, Clarisse (24 September 2015), "La Cogerco a les jambes en coton", Iwacu (in French)
