= COTEBU =

Bujumbura Textile Complex
- Trade name: COTEBU
- Native name: Complexe Textile de Bujumbura
- Founded: 16 November 1978; 46 years ago in Bujumbura, Burundi
- Defunct: 2006
- Headquarters: Avenue de l'Agriculture, Industrial District, Bujumbura, Burundi
- COTEBU Headquarters (Burundi)

The Bujumbura Textile Complex (French: Complexe Textile de Bujumbura, COTEBU), was a state-owned textile company in Bujumbura, Burundi. It was succeeded by the private AFRITEXTILE.

== Origins ==
The first attempt to create a textile factory in Burundi was with BURUTEX, which was meant to produce textiles from locally grown cotton, but failed.

On 6 January 1972 the government of Burundi signed an agreement with the People's Republic of China, for an interest-free credit to buy equipment and goods. In 1974, an agreement was signed for construction of a textile factory in Bujumbura. Work began in 1976 and was completed in 1980. The buildings were on a 21.68 hectares (53.6 acres) plot. A playground and a plot were located opposite the head office with an area of 2.41 hectares (6.0 acres).

The Bujumbura Textile Complex (Complexe Textile de Bujumbura: COTEBU) was created by decree n°100/107 of 16 November 1978 as a Public Establishment of an Industrial and Commercial nature. It was supervised by the minister responsible for industry. Decree n°100/159 of 5 September 1997 noted that the textile complex had its headquarters in Avenue de l'Agriculture in the Industrial District of Bujumbura.

== Operations ==
COTEBU was one of the most important enterprise in Burundi before collapsing due to poor management and the effect of the Burundian Civil War. When it started operations in was the only textile company in Burundi and in the sub-region including Rwanda, Uganda and the Democratic Republic of the Congo. The company would import the required machinery, materials and equipment, and would manufacture and market all related and derivative products. It could export products to earn foreign exchange.

The Cotton Management Company (Compagnie de Gérance du Coton, COGERCO) planted, grew and harvested cotton and delivered high-quality fibers. COTEBU used them to produce excellent quality cotton textiles, and won first place in an industry competition in Madrid, Spain, in 1982. Factories to manufacture clothing and sewing products began to be created, and managed to make shirts in 15 minutes, compared to 5 minutes in Europe. But an attempt to export clothes failed due to the Burundian Civil War.

When launched, weaving capacity was 9,000,000 metres (30,000,000 ft) per year, and finishing capacity was 15,000,000 metres (49,000,000 ft) per year. Production of finished textiles steadily increased from 773,207 metres (2,536,768 ft) in 1980 to 12,588,559 metres (41,301,047 ft) in 1990, while sales rose from 2,337,600 metres (7,669,300 ft) in 1981 to 10,579,591 metres (34,709,944 ft) in 1989, then fell to 9,986,600 metres (32,764,400 ft) in 1990. The company made a mistaken decision in 1993 to expand production by installing more machines, but rather than buy new and more efficient machines, it bought more of the original type. The company was loaded with debt as a result.

With the political crisis of 1993 the cotton crop was gradually abandoned by farmers, and replaced by more profitable food crops. Quantities of textile produced by COTEBU dropped to 4,901,301 metres (16,080,384 ft) in 1993. 4,838,907 metres (15,875,679 ft) were produced in 2000, rising to 7,264,798 metres (23,834,639 ft) in 2005. COTEBU closed down in 2006 and 2007, and dismissed almost 1,600 workers.

== Succession ==
In 2010 the government sold COTEBU's assets to a company headquartered in Mauritius. The successor, Afritextile, was launched that year. Afritextile's manufactures and markets "kitenge" pagnes and cotton polyester products. It uses cotton produced in Burundi and purchased in the sub-region and polyester synthetic fiber. It has spinning, weaving and dyeing / printing workshops, and has 1200 employees.

In August 2021 Déo Guide Rurema, Minister of Environment, Agriculture and Livestock, stated that the cotton fiber supplier COGERCO was making heavy losses. It was being audited, and then there would be talks with Afritextile to see how the two companies could work together in future.

== See also ==
- List of companies of Burundi
- Economy of Burundi

== Sources ==
- Barangenza, Laurent (29 June 2021), "La diplomatie économique figure parmi les priorités du Gouvernement du Burundi", Radio Télévision Nationale du Burundi (in French)
- "La COGERCO, une entreprise en faillite", ABP (in French), 18 August 2021
- "Le Complexe Textile de Bujumbura sur la liste des entreprises a privatiser", arib.info (in French), 16 February 2009
- "La privatisation de Cotebu", RFI, 8 December 2010
- "Les friperies déstabilisent l'industrie textile", Burundi Eco (in French), 19 November 2021
- Nyandwi, Salvator NYANDWI (2013), Analyse des déterminants de la faillite des entreprises publiques burundaises: cas du Complexe Textile de Bujumbura (COTEBU) (in French), Institut supérieur de gestion des entreprises
