= Burundian franc =

National currency of Burundi

franc burundais (French)
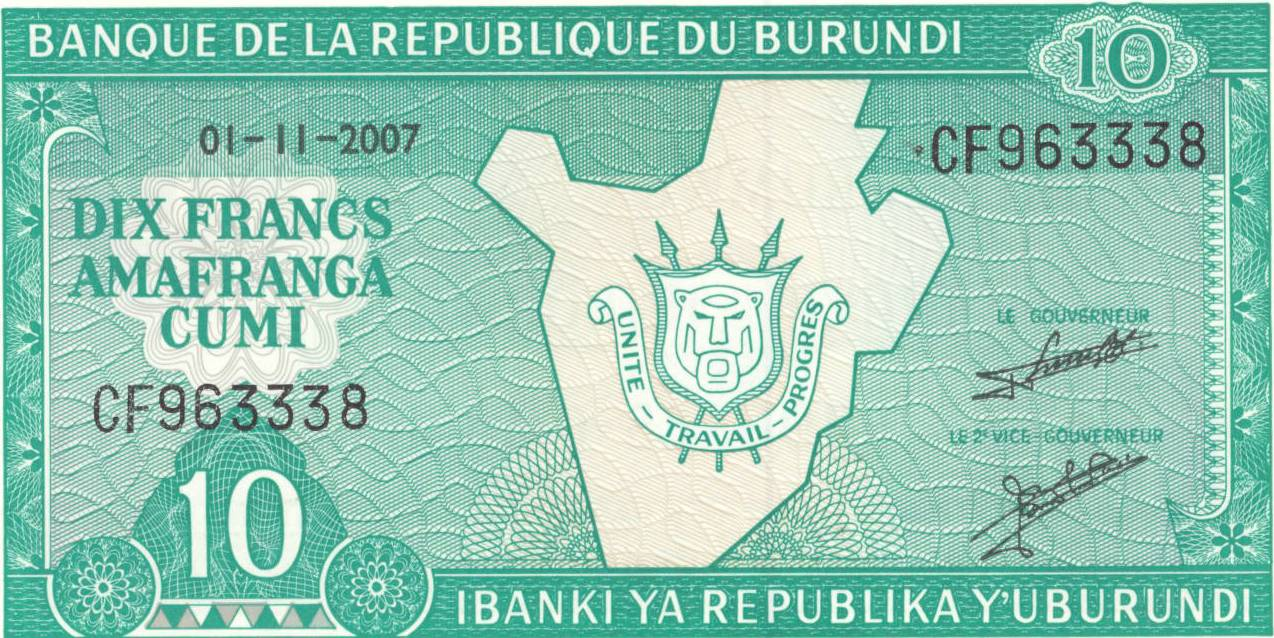
- 10 franc banknote

ISO 4217
- Code: BIF (numeric: 108)

Unit
- Symbol: FBu

Denominations
- Subunit
- 1/100: centime
- Banknotes: 100, 500, 1,000, 2,000, 5,000, 10,000 francs
- Coins: 1, 5, 10, 50 francs

Demographics
- User(s): Burundi

Issuance
- Central bank: Banque de la Republique du Burundi (Ibanki ya Republika Y'UBurundi)
- Website: www.brb.bi

Valuation
- Inflation: 38.10%
- Source: https://www.brb.bi/; February 19, 2024

The franc (ISO 4217 code is BIF) is the currency of Burundi. It is nominally subdivided into 100 centimes, although coins have never been issued in centimes since Burundi began issuing its own currency. Only during the period when Burundi used the Belgian Congo franc were centime coins issued.

== History ==
The franc became the currency of Burundi in 1916, when Belgium occupied the former German colony and replaced the German East African rupie with the Belgian Congo franc. Burundi used the currency of Belgian Congo until 1960, when the Rwanda and Burundi franc was introduced. Burundi began issuing its own francs in 1964.

There were plans to introduce a common currency, a new East African shilling, for the five member states of the East African Community by the end of 2015. As of March 2025, these plans have not yet materialized.

== Coins ==
In 1965, the Bank of the Kingdom of Burundi issued brass 1 franc coins. In 1968, Bank of the Republic of Burundi took over the issuance of coins and introduced aluminum 1 and 5 francs and cupro-nickel 10 francs. The 5 and 10 francs have continuous milled edges. Second types of the 1 and 5 franc coins were introduced in 1976, featuring the coat of arms. In 2011 new 10 and 50 franc coins were introduced.

Burundian franc coins
| Image | Value | Composition | Diameter | Weight | Thickness | Edge | Issued |
|---|---|---|---|---|---|---|---|
| | 1 franc | Aluminum | 18.9 mm | .87 g | 1 mm | Reeded | 1976-2003 |
| | 5 francs | Aluminum | 25 mm | 2.20 g | 2 mm | Reeded | 1976-2013 |
| | 10 francs | Copper-nickel | 28 mm | 7.8 g | | Reeded | 1968-1971 |
| | 10 francs | Nickel-plated steel | 27 mm | 6.2 g | 1.63 mm | Reeded | 2011 |
| | 50 francs | Nickel-plated steel | 29 mm | 7.2 g | 1.63 mm | Reeded | 2011 |

== Banknotes ==
From February 1964 until 31 December 1965, notes of the Banque d'Émission du Rwanda et du Burundi (Issuing Bank of Rwanda and Burundi), in denominations of 5, 10, 20, 50, 100, 500 and 1,000 francs, were overprinted with a diagonal hollow "BURUNDI" for use in the country. These were followed in 1964 and 1965 by regular issues in the same denominations by the Banque du Royaume du Burundi (Bank of the Kingdom of Burundi).

In 1966, notes for 20 francs and above were overprinted by the Bank of the Republic of Burundi, replacing the word "Kingdom" with "Republic". Regular issues of this bank began in denominations of 10, 20, 50, 100, 500, 1,000 and 5,000 francs. 10 francs were replaced by coins in 1968. 2,000 franc notes were introduced in 2001, followed by 10,000 francs in 2004. Photographer Kelly Fajack's image of school kids in Burundi was used on the back of the Burundian 10,000 franc note. In 2015 Burundi launched a new series of banknotes. The 10, 20, and 50 franc banknotes have lost their legal tender status and the 100 franc banknote is the only note from the old series in circulation.

| Image | | Value | Dimensions | Main Colour | Description | | Date of | | | |
| Obverse | Reverse | Value | Dimensions | Main Colour | Obverse | Reverse | printing | issue | withdrawal | lapse |
|---|---|---|---|---|---|---|---|---|---|---|
| | | 10 Francs | | green | Map and Coat of arms of Burundi | Value, motto | | | | |
| | | 20 Francs | | red-pink | | Coat of arms of Burundi | | | | |
These images are to scale at 0.7 pixel per millimetre (18 pixel per inch). For table standards, see the banknote specification table.

Banknotes of the Burundian franc
| Image | Value | Obverse | Reverse | Remark |
|---|---|---|---|---|
| | 50 francs (Mirongo Itanu Amafranga) | Dugout canoe | Fishermen, hippo | |
| | 100 francs (Ijana Amafranga) | Prince Louis Rwagasore | Home construction | Original size: 150 x 70 mm. |
| | 100 francs (Ijana Amafranga) | Prince Louis Rwagasore | Home construction | Reduced size: 125 x 65 mm. |
| | 500 francs (Amajan Atanu Amafranga) | President Melchior Ndadaye | Banque de la République du Burundi (Ibanki ya Republika y'Uburundi; Bank of the Republic of Burundi) building, Bujumbura | |
| | 500 francs (Amajan Atanu Amafranga) | Navite art | Banque de la République du Burundi (Ibanki ya Republika y'Uburundi; Bank of the Republic of Burundi) building, Bujumbura | Original size: 160 x 73 mm. |
| | 500 francs (Amajan Atanu Amafranga) | Navite art | Banque de la République du Burundi (Ibanki ya Republika y'Uburundi; Bank of the Republic of Burundi) building, Bujumbura | Reduced size: 130 x 67 mm. |
| | 500 francs (Amajan Atanu Amafranga) | Crocodile, coat of arms and Flag of Burundi, coffee branch | Outline of Burundi, boat on Lake Tanganyika | |
| | 1000 francs (Igihumbi Amafranga) | Cattle | Monument de l'Unite, Bujumbura | Original size: 170 x 76 mm. |
| | 1000 francs (Igihumbi Amafranga) | Cattle | Monument de l'Unite, Bujumbura | Reduced size: 135 x 69 mm. |
| | 1000 francs (Igihumbi Amafranga) | Bird, coat of arms and Flag of Burundi, cattle | Outline of Burundi, banana trees | |
| | 2000 francs (Ibihumbi Bibiri Amafranga) | Harvest | Lake | A printed note showing white borders on each corner. |
| | 2000 francs (Ibihumbi Bibiri Amafranga) | Harvest | Lake | Full printing on the note. |
| | 2000 francs (Ibihumbi Bibiri Amafranga) | Antelope, coat of arms and Flag of Burundi, pineapple | Outline of Burundi, fieldwork | |
| | 5000 francs (Ibihumbi Bitanu Amafranga) | Coat of arms of Burundi; Parliament of Burundi building | Port of Bujumbura (Lake Tanganyika) | Registration device on the lower center of the note; without the watermark area |
| | 5000 francs (Ibihumbi Bitanu Amafranga) | Coat of arms of Burundi; Parliament of Burundi building | Port of Bujumbura (Lake Tanganyika) | Registration device moved to the left side of the note; watermark area added; addition of bull-shaped holographic patch |
| | 5000 francs (Ibihumbi Bitanu Amafranga) | Coat of arms of Burundi; Parliament of Burundi building | Port of Bujumbura (Lake Tanganyika) | Full printing |
| | 5000 francs (Ibihumbi Bitanu Amafranga) | Buffalo, coat of arms and Flag of Burundi, dancers with drums | Outline of Burundi, landscape | |
| | 10,000 francs (Ibihumbi Cumi Amafranga) | Prince Louis Rwagasore and President Melchior Ndadaye | Classroom scene (based on a photograph by Kelly Fajack) | |
| | 10,000 francs (Ibihumbi Cumi Amafranga) | Hippo, coat of arms and Flag of Burundi, Prince Louis Rwagasore and President Melchior Ndadaye | Outline of Burundi, plants | |

== Historical exchange rates ==
On 3 January 2006, the franc was valued at 925 per $1. On January 1, 2008, the franc was valued at 1,129.40 per US dollar. On January 1, 2009, the franc was valued at 1,234.33 per U.S. dollar. On 10 July, the franc was valued at 1,587.60 per US dollar.

In April 2025, while the U.S. dollar was officially quoted at 2800 francs, it was quoted at over 7500 francs in the black market.

Current BIF exchange rates
| From Google Finance: | AUD CAD CHF CNY EUR GBP HKD JPY USD |
| From Yahoo! Finance: | AUD CAD CHF CNY EUR GBP HKD JPY USD |
| From XE.com: | AUD CAD CHF CNY EUR GBP HKD JPY USD |
| From OANDA: | AUD CAD CHF CNY EUR GBP HKD JPY USD |

== See also ==
- Economy of Burundi
- Rwandan franc
