= Economy of Burundi =

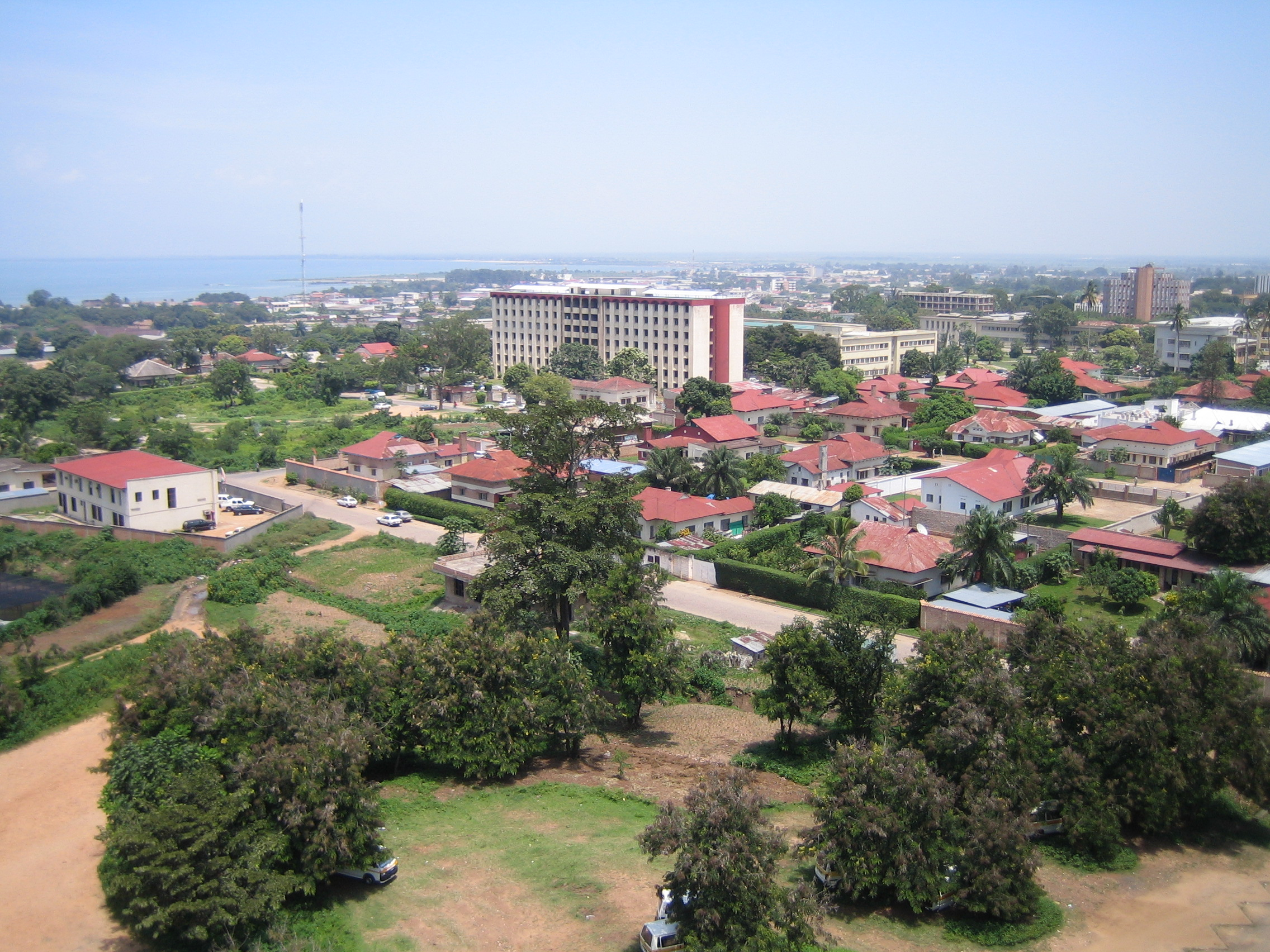
- Bujumbura, Burundi's economic capital
- Currency: Burundian franc (BIF, FBu)
- Fiscal year: Calendar year
- Trade organisations: AU, AfCFTA (signed), WTO
- Country group: Least Developed; Low-income economy

Statistics
- GDP: ▲$9.212 billion (nominal; 2026); ▲$15.162 billion (PPP; 2026)
- GDP rank: 158th (nominal; 2026); 163rd (PPP; 2026)
- GDP growth: ▲3.5% (2024); ▲1.9% (2025); ▲2.6% (2026f); ▲2.8% (2027f)
- GDP per capita: ▲$618 (nominal; 2026); ▲$1,017 (PPP; 2026)
- GDP per capita rank: 193rd (nominal; 2026); 197th (PPP; 2026)
- GDP by sector: agriculture (32.9%), industry (21.3%), services (45.8%) (2008)
- Inflation (CPI): 200% (2024 est.)
- Population below national poverty line: 53% (2010)
- Human Development Index: ▲0.439 low (2023) (187th); ▲0.286 low IHDI (2023)
- Labour force: 4.08 million (2010)
- Labour force by occupation: agriculture (89%), industry (5.3%, services (4.1%) (2002)
- Unemployment: 1% (2020)
- Main industries: light consumer goods such as blankets, shoes, soap, assembly of imported components, public works construction, food processing Agriculture: coffee, cotton, tea, corn, sorghum, sweet potatoes, bananas, manioc (tapioca); beef, milk, hides

External
- Exports: $208 million (2022)
- Export goods: coffee, tea, sugar, cotton, hides
- Main export partners: Germany 15.2% Pakistan 9.3% Kenya 8.5% China 7.8% Sweden 7.3% Belgium 5.3% Canada 4.6% Rwanda 4.5% United States 4.2% (2018 est.)
- Imports: $1.260 billion (2022)
- Import goods: capital goods, petroleum products, foodstuffs
- Main import partners: Saudi Arabia 17.3% China 8.1% Uganda 7.8% Belgium 7.2% Kenya 6.9% Zambia 6.7% India 5.6% United Arab Emirates 5.3% (2018 est.)
- Gross external debt: $820 million (2010)

Public finance
- Foreign reserves: $412.2 million
- Revenue: $350.4 million (2018)
- Spending: $351.3 million (2017)
- Economic aid: $90.7 million (2010)
- All values, unless otherwise stated, are in US dollars.

Burundi has a developing economy. It generates $9.21 billion by gross domestic product (GDP) as of 2026, being heavily dependent on agriculture, which accounts for 32.9% of gross domestic product as of 2008. Burundi itself is a landlocked country lacking resources, and with almost nonexistent industrialization. Agriculture supports more than 70% of the labor force, the majority of whom are subsistence farmers.

Although Burundi is potentially self-sufficient in food production, issues such as civil unrest, overpopulation, and soil erosion have contributed to the contraction of the subsistence economy by 25% in recent years. Large numbers of internally displaced persons have been unable to produce their own food and are largely dependent on international humanitarian assistance. Burundi is a net food importer, with food accounting for 17% of imports in 1997.

== Overview and history ==
Little industry exists except for the processing of agricultural exports. Although potential wealth in petroleum, nickel, copper, and other natural resources is being explored, the uncertain security situation has prevented meaningful investor interest. Industrial development also is hampered by Burundi's distance from the sea and high transport costs. Lake Tanganyika remains an important trading point. The trade embargo, lifted in 1999, negatively impacted trade and industry. Since October 1993 the nation has suffered from massive ethnic-based violence which has resulted in the death of perhaps 250,000 people and the displacement of about 800,000 others. Foods, medicines, and electricity remain in short supply.

Burundi is heavily dependent on bilateral and multilateral aid, with external debt totaling $1.247 billion (1.247 G$) in 1997. A series of largely unsuccessful 5-year plans initiated in July 1986 in partnership with the World Bank and the International Monetary Fund attempted to reform the foreign exchange system, liberalize imports, reduce restrictions on international transactions, diversify exports, and reform the coffee industry.

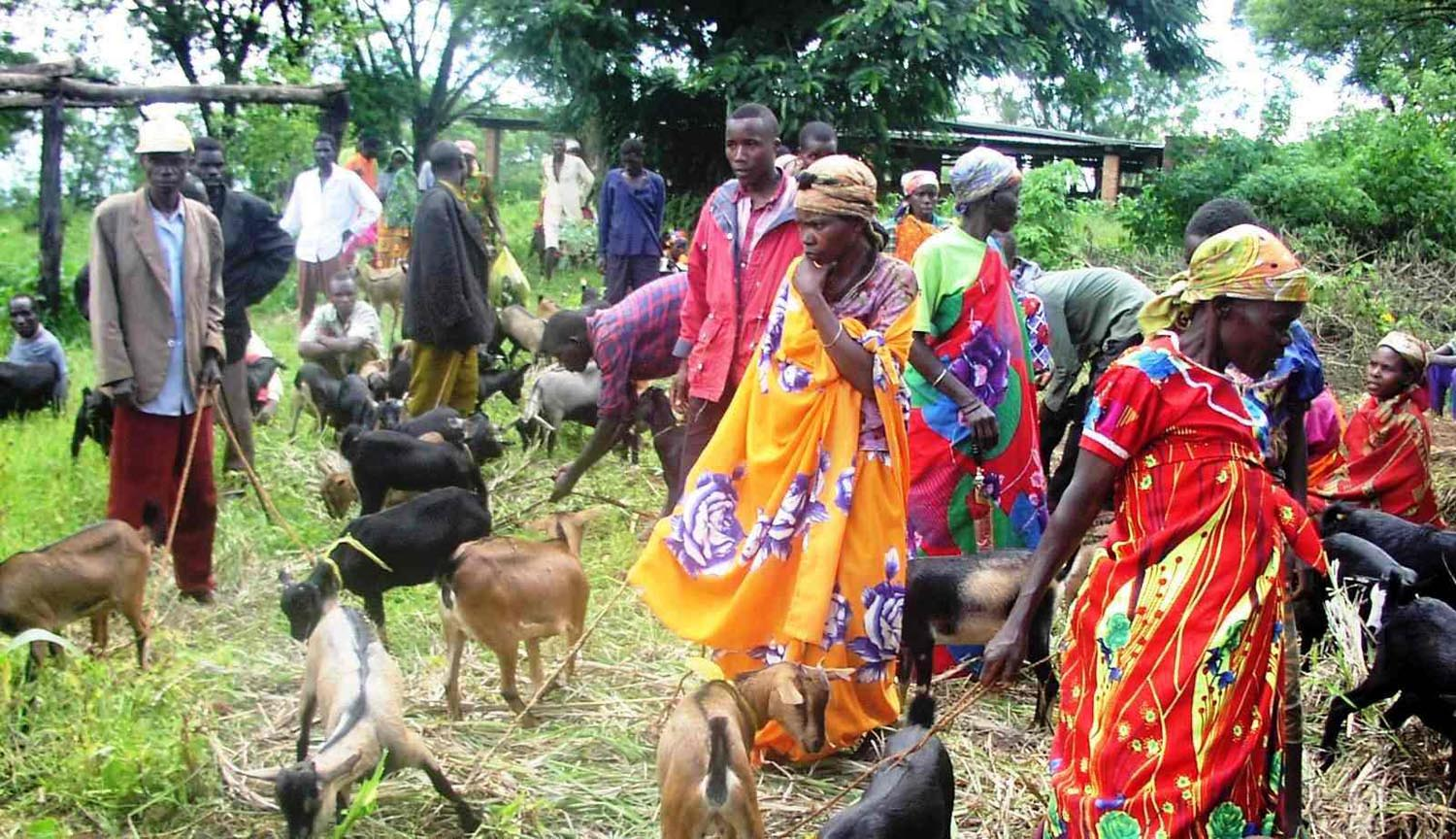
Goat rearing has been promoted as a source of income for rural-dwelling Burundians.

IMF structural adjustment programs in Burundi were suspended following the outbreak of the crisis in 1993. The World Bank has identified key areas for potential growth, including the productivity of traditional crops and the introduction of new exports, light manufactures, industrial mining, and services. Other serious problems include the state's role in the economy, the question of governmental transparency, and debt reduction.

To protest the 1996 coup by President Pierre Buyoya, neighboring countries imposed an economic embargo on Burundi. Although the embargo was never officially ratified by the United Nations Security Council, most countries refrained from official trade with Burundi. Following the coup, the United States also suspended all but humanitarian aid to Burundi. The regional embargo was lifted on January 23, 1999, based on progress by the government in advancing national reconciliation through the Burundi peace process.

In an article titled "The Blood Cries Out," Foreign Policy (FP) reported that the Burundian population growth rate is 2.5 percent per year, more than double the average global pace, and that a Burundian woman has on average 6.3 children, nearly triple the international fertility rate. FP further reported that "The vast majority of Burundians rely on subsistence farming, but under the weight of a booming population and in the long-standing absence of coherent policies governing land ownership, many people barely have enough earth to sustain themselves." In 2014, the average size for a farm was about one acre. FP added that "The consequence is remarkable scarcity: In the 2013 Global Hunger Index, Burundi had the severest hunger and malnourishment rates of all 120 countries ranked."

=== Energy crisis ===
Burundi is one of the least electrified countries in the world, only about 10% of the country's population has access to electricity. In 2022, the country produced a total of 565 GWh of electricity, 50% of which was generated via fossil fuels while the other 50% was generated via renewables. Oil is the main fossil fuel in use, while the renewable energy is sourced primarily from hydropower and to a much lesser degree from solar energy as well as bioenergy. This domestic production however does not fulfil Burundi's demand and it imports sizeable amount of energy from neighbouring countries.

By October 2025, Burundi has faced a severe fuel shortage for nearly five years, accompanied by widespread power outages and drinking-water scarcity that have disrupted daily life in Bujumbura, Gitega and other urban centres. These combined crises have affected households, schools, hospitals and businesses, many of which cannot operate without electricity or fuel. Media outlets have been forced to suspend broadcasts, students struggle to study, and small traders report major financial losses as they are unable to keep goods refrigerated or equipment running. The lack of water has further undermined sanitation, compounding public-health risks such as cholera outbreaks. Economists describe the situation as one of the worst crises in Burundi’s recent history, even compared with the embargo of the 1990s, while residents and civil-society voices continue to call for urgent measures to restore essential services.

The opening of the Rusumo Hydroelectric Power Station in 2023 added 27 MW to Burundi’s grid and helped provide the capital city of Gitega with a more reliable power supply, allowing the government to shut down an older oil-fired plant and reduce costs. The power generated will be shared equally among the countries of Burundi, Rwanda, and Tanzania. Burundi is also developing a much larger hydropower project at Rubirizi, expected to produce 160 MW upon completion, which would become the country’s largest power plant and improve electricity access to 7% of the country's population.

== Sectors ==
=== Agriculture ===
Burundi produced in 2022:

- 2.6 million tons of cassava;
- 1.3 million tons of banana;
- 808 thousand tons of sweet potato;
- 507 thousand tons of vegetables;
- 499 thousand tons of beans;
- 355 thousand tons of potato;
- 280 thousand tons of maize;
- 188 thousand tons of sugar cane;
- 130 thousand tons of fruit;
- 127 thousand tons of rice;
- 94 thousand tons of taro;
- 89 thousand tons of palm oil;
- 50 thousand tons of tea;

In addition to smaller productions of other agricultural products, like sorghum (25 thousand tons) and coffee (17 thousand tons).

=== Mining ===
Burundi is a producer of columbium (niobium) and tantalum ore, tin ore, and tungsten ore, and some deposits of gold which are designated for export. Burundi has resources of copper, cobalt, nickel, feldspar, phosphate rock, quartzite, and rare reserves of uranium, and vanadium.

=== Tourism ===
Tourism in Burundi refers to tourism in Burundi. Bujumbura, the largest city and former capital of Burundi, is a major tourist attraction of the country. In addition to this, Lake Tanganyika is a popular tourist attraction.

The documents normally required for a customs declaration are the bill of lading, the commercial invoice, a packing list, the transport document and, for goods claiming preferential treatment, a certificate of origin; a certificate issued by the pre-shipment inspection company is also required.

== Economic statistics ==
Exports of Burundi by product category (2019) Chemical products Transportation Machines Mineral products Plastics and rubbers Metals Foodstuffs Precious metals Textiles Instruments Animal products Vegetable products Paper goods Footwear and headwear Miscellaneous Stone and glass Wood products Animal and vegetable bi-products Animal hides Arts and antiques Weapons

The following table shows the main economic indicators in 1980–2026. Inflation above 5% is in green.

Year	GDP (in bil. US$ PPP)	GDP per capita (in US$ PPP)	GDP (in bil. US$ nominal)	GDP Growth (real)	Inflation rate (in Percent)	Government debt (Percentage of GDP)
1980	1.5	383	1.1	▼ -6.8	▲1.2	n/a
1985	▲2.6	▲551	▲1.4	▲11.8	▲3.8	n/a
1990	▲3.6	▲668	▼1.3	▲3.5	▲7.0	n/a
1995	3.6	▼610	▼1.2	▼ -7.9	▲18.9	n/a
2000	▲3.9	▼599	▼1.0	▲1.8	▲24.4	▲120
2005	▲5.0	▲661	▲1.1	▲4.4	▲13.3	▲137
2006	▲5.5	▲693	▲1.3	▲5.4	▲2.7	▼130.3
2007	▲5.8	▲710	▲1.4	▲3.5	▲8.4	▼129.6
2008	▲6.2	▲728	▲1.6	▲4.9	▲24.4	▼102.5
2009	▲6.5	▼723	▲1.8	▲3.8	▲10.6	▼25.7
2010	▲6.9	▲734	▲2.0	▲5.1	▲6.5	▲46.9
2011	▲7.3	▲752	▲2.2	▲4.0	▲9.6	▼42.7
2012	▲7.8	▲772	▲2.3	▲4.4	▲18.2	▼41.4
2013	▲8.3	▲795	▲2.5	▲4.9	▲7.9	▼37.9
2014	▲8.8	▲815	▲2.7	▲4.2	▲4.4	▲38
2015	▼8.5	▼772	▲3.1	▼ -3.9	▲5.5	▲39.9
2016	▲8.6	▼762	▼3.0	▼ -0.6	▲5.6	▲46.1
2017	▲8.8	▼761	▲3.2	▲0.5	▲15.8	▲46.9
2018	▲8.9	▼753	▼3.0	▲1.6	▲ -2.8	▲53
2019	▲9.5	▲778	3.0	▲1.8	▲ -0.8	▲60.1
2020	▲9.9	▲787	▲3.1	▲0.3	▲7.5	▲65.9
2021	▲10.9	▲838	▲3.4	▲3.1	▲8.4	▼63.6
2022	▲11.8	▲889	▲3.9	▲1.8	▲18.9	▲69.8
2023	▲12.6	▲921	▲4.3	▲2.7	▲27.1	▼59.9
2024	▲13.5	▲958	▲4.8	▲4.1	▲20.2	▼53.1
2025	▲14.4	▲994	▲6.9	▲3.9	▲34.2	▼41.2
2026	▲15.4	▲1031	▲8.1	▲3.8	▲14.5	▼37

== See also ==
- United Nations Economic Commission for Africa
- List of companies based in Burundi
