= Banque Centrale du Congo Belge et du Ruanda-Urundi =

Former Belgian colonial central bank

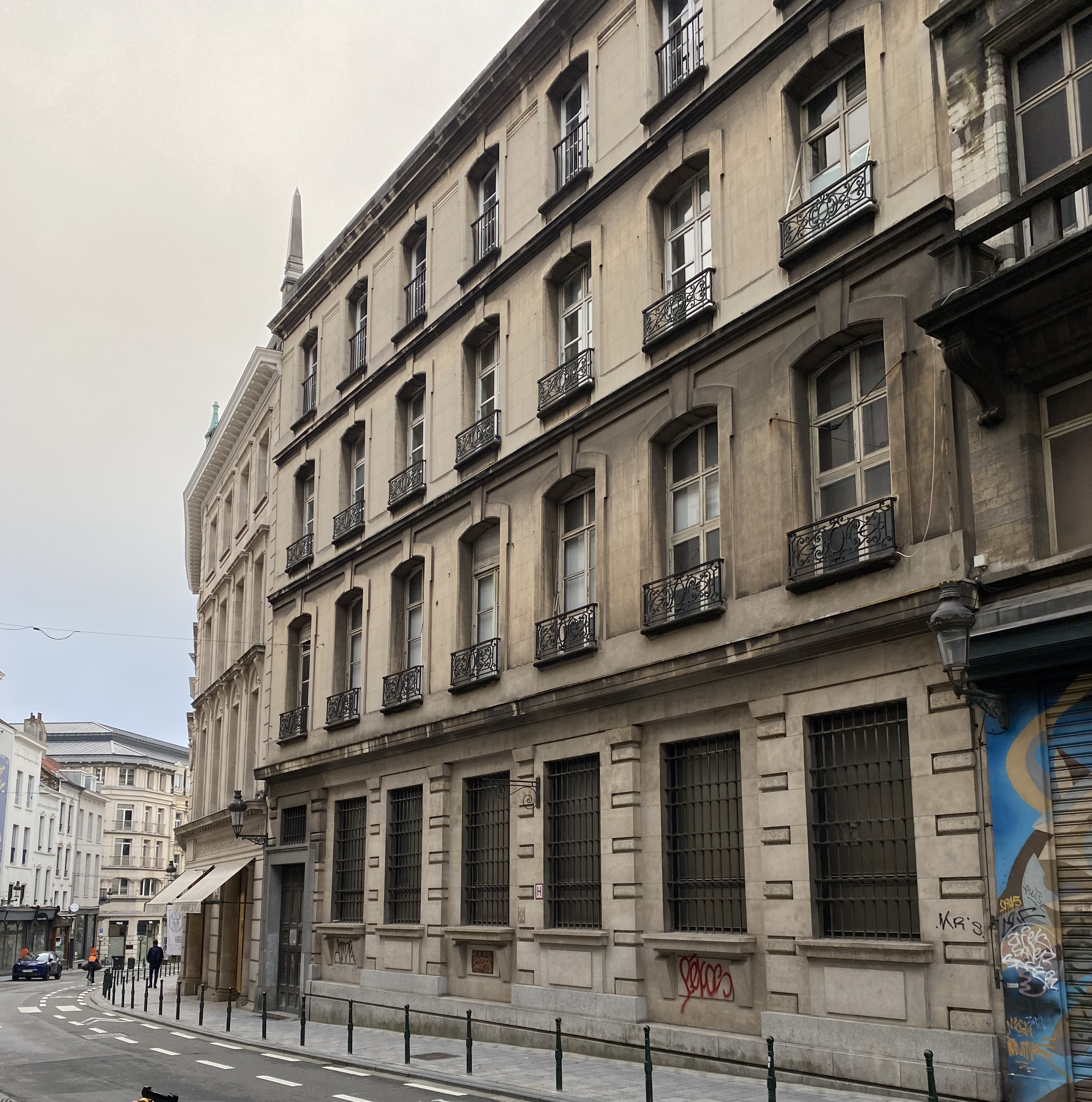
Building at rue de Namur 54 in Brussels, former seat of the BCCBRU

The Banque Centrale du Congo Belge et du Ruanda-Urundi (BCCBRU) was a short-lived central bank whose territorial remit covered Belgian Congo and Ruanda-Urundi. It was established in 1952 to take over monetary authority from the private-sector Banque du Congo Belge upon expiry of the latter's issuance charter. Made obsolete by Congolese independence in mid-1960, it finally ceased activity on 31 August 1961.

Its successors were, in the Congo, the Monetary Council (French: Conseil monétaire de la République du Congo), established in October 1960 and itself replaced in 1964 by the Banque Nationale du Congo; and in Ruanda-Urundi, the Banque d'Emission du Rwanda et du Burundi (BERB) replaced, also in 1964, by the National Bank of Rwanda and the Banque du Royaume du Burundi.

== History ==
The Banque du Congo Belge (BCB), founded in 1909 in Brussels, had received in 1911 the exclusive privilege of monetary issuance in the Belgian Congo, which was renewed in 1927 for a duration of 25 years. As the deadline approached in 1952, the BCB opted not to request further renewal so that it could focus on competitive commercial activities, an area where the dominance of its affiliate the Banque Commerciale du Congo was increasingly challenged by the Banque Belge d'Afrique (est. 1929) and the Société Congolaise de Banque (est. 1947).

The BCCBRU was established by legal texts respectively of the Colonial authorities on 30 July 1951 and of the Belgian government on 29 September 1951, enacted by royal decree on 26 October 1951. It divided its share ownership between the Colonial government of Belgian Congo (50 percent), its counterpart in Ruanda-Urundi (10 percent), the National Bank of Belgium (20 percent), and private shareholders through a stock listing (20 percent), which remained dispersed among many small holders. Partly as a result of this structure, the Ministry of the Colonies had greater direct influence over the BCCBRU than the Belgian government had over the National Bank of Belgium.

Like most other Belgian colonial enterprises, it was legally registered overseas in Léopoldville (now Kinshasa) but practically run from its operating seat (French: siège administratif) in Brussels. Its legal status was of an association under public law (French: association de droit public), practically equivalent to a limited-liability company. In addition to its core monetary mandate, the new institution was also granted authority over banking supervision, securities regulation, and foreign exchange controls in the two territories. The first of these three mandates only became effective on 1 May 1957; the second was largely insubstantial given the lack of development of securities markets.

In Brussels, the BCCBRU acquired a building dating from 1855, at rue de Namur 54, for its head office. In the course of 1952 it established offices in Léopoldville, Usumbura, Elisabethville, Bukavu, Coquilhatville, Luluabourg, and Stanleyville. Its office in Léopoldville was at Avenue des Aviateurs 24, which later became the Medical Center of the Central Bank of the Congo; the General Inspectorate (French: inspection générale) was based in Usumbura (now Bujumbura). By mid-1952 the BCCBRU had 81 employees in Belgium and 190 in Africa. At its peak in late 1959, it had 793 employees in total, of which 192 in Belgium and 601 in Africa.

Like all components of the Belgian colonial establishment, the BCCBRU was poorly prepared for the consequences of Congolese independence in mid-1960. On 2 August 1960, the self-proclaimed State of Katanga commandeered the bank's branch in Elisabethville and decreed its conversion into the National Bank of Katanga. Two days later, a Belgian emergency decree converted the Usumbura branch into the BERB, which reopened to the public in its new capacity on 22 September 1960, upon which the BCCBRU was simultaneously relieved of any role or duties in Ruanda-Urundi. Meanwhile, at negotiations in Geneva, the International Monetary Fund brokered an agreement providing for the BCCBRU to be liquidated and replaced in Congo by a national central bank. On 3 October 1960, the government of the Republic of the Congo established the Conseil monétaire de la République du Congo to that effect, and on 15 November 1960, the agreement on the transfer of assets and responsibilities was signed in New York City, by Ambassador to the U.N. Walter Loridan on behalf of Belgium and Chairman of the Board of Commissioners-General Justin Bomboko on behalf of the Congo. Instruments of ratification were duly exchanged in Brazzaville on 15 February 1961.

== Banque d'Emission du Rwanda et du Burundi ==
The BERB kept operating on the former BCCBRU's infrastructure from September 1960 onwards, but was soon rendered similarly obsolete as Rwanda became an independent republic in 1961 and Burundi became an independent monarchy in 1962. In 1964 each state established its own central bank, respectively the National Bank of Rwanda and the Banque du Royaume du Burundi. The BERB was subsequently liquidated in May 1964.

== Leadership ==
- Paul Charles, Governor 1951-1954
- Hector Martin, Governor 1954-1961
- Karel-Antoine-Francis Vercruysse, Vice-Governor 1956-1961

== See also ==
- Ruanda-Urundi franc
- Institut d'Émission des États du Cambodge, du Laos et du Viet-nam
- List of banks in Belgium
