= List of banks in Burundi =

This is a list of banks in Burundi, as updated in late 2024 by the Bank of the Republic of Burundi.

== List of banks ==
- Banque Commerciale du Burundi (BANCOBU)
- Banque de Gestion et de Financement (BGF)
- Banque Burundaise pour le Commerce et l'Investissement (BBCI)
- FinBank
- Interbank Burundi (IBB)
- Ecobank Burundi, part of Ecobank Group
- Banque de Crédit de Bujumbura (BCB), part of the Bank of Africa Group
- Diamond Trust Bank Burundi (DTB), part of Diamond Trust Bank Group
- KCB Bank Burundi (KCB), part of KCB Group
- CRDB Bank Burundi (CRDB), part of CRDB Bank Group
- Banque Communautaire et Agricole du Burundi (BCAB)
- Banque d'Investissement pour les Jeunes (BIJE), government-owned
- Banque de l'Habitat du Burundi (BHB)
- Banque d'Investissement et de Développement pour les Femmes (BIDF), government-owned
- Banque Nationale de Développement Économique (BNDE)
- Bedrock Financial Bank (BFB)

== See also ==
- List of banks in Africa
- List of companies based in Burundi
