= Banque de Crédit de Bujumbura =

Commercial bank in Burundi

Credit Bank of Bujumbura
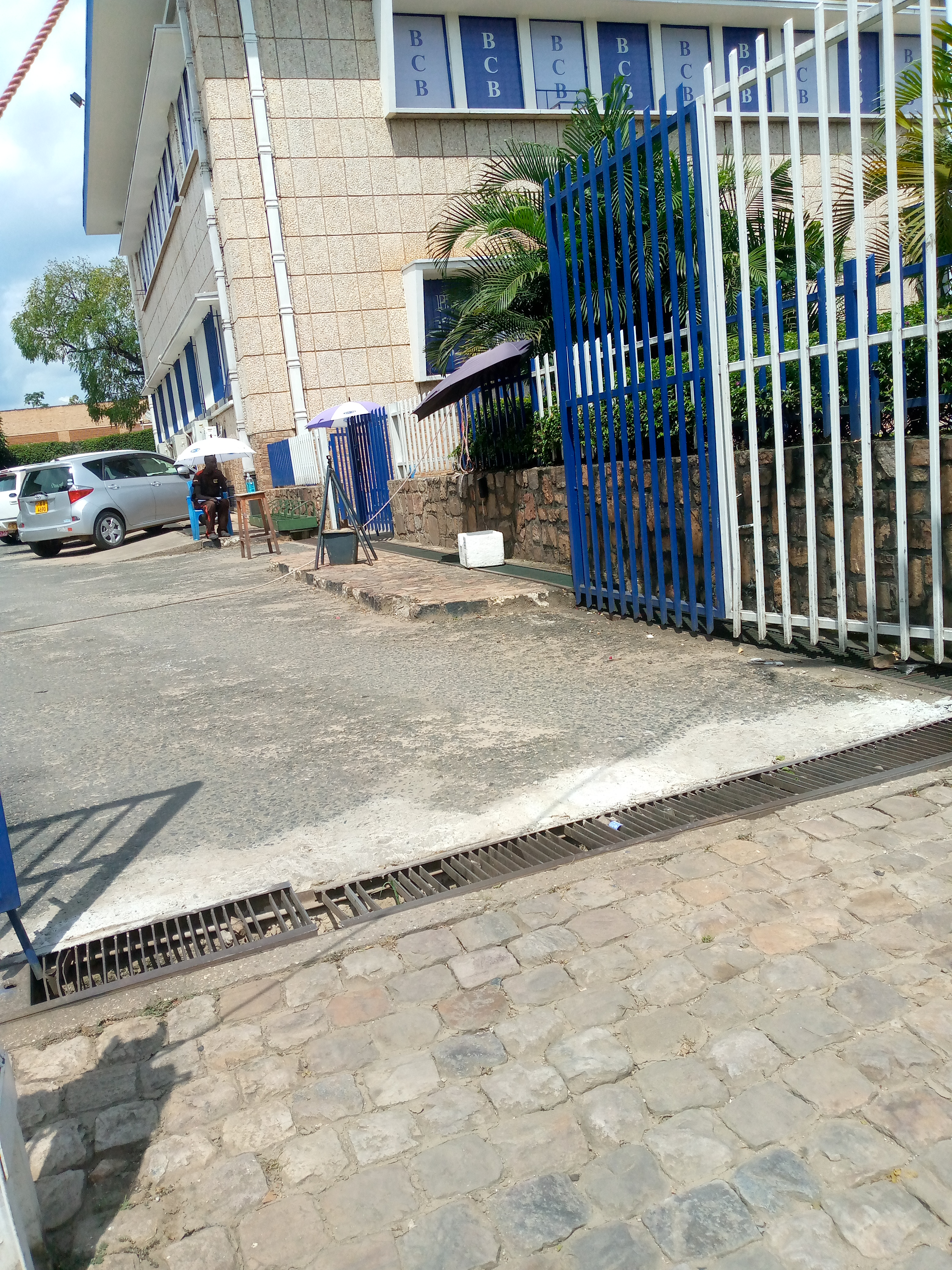
- BCB head office in 2022
- Trade name: BCB
- Native name: Banque de Crédit de Bujumbura
- Type: Mixed ownership company, Part of the Bank of Africa Group
- Industry: Financial services
- Founded: 8 August 1964; 62 years ago
- Headquarters: Bujumbura, Burundi
- Area served: Burundi
- Key people: Roger Guy Ghislain Ntwenguye (CEO)
- Products: Banking services
- BCB Headquarters (Burundi)
- Website: www.bcb.bi

The Credit Bank of Bujumbura (French: Banque de Crédit de Bujumbura), or BCB, is a commercial bank in Burundi. It was founded in 1964 and has been majority-owned by the Bank of Africa Group since 2010.

== History ==
=== Origins ===
The BCB originated as a branch of the Banque du Congo Belge (BCB), which was created in 1909 by the Banque d'Outremer of the Kingdom of Belgium. From 1911 to 1952, the Banque d'Outremer was a bank of issue. It opened a branch in Usumbura (now Bujumbura) in 1922. Usumbura, a port on Lake Tanganyika, was the region's commercial centre.

In 1964, after Burundi became independent and banking regulations were revised, the former branch of the Banque d'Outremer became the Banque de Crédit de Bujumbura (BCB). BCB began operations on 8 August 1964 with capital of 50 million BIF.

=== Shareholding changes 1965 onwards ===
The Banque de Crédit de Bujumbura was acquired in 1965 by Banque Belgolaise.

In June 2008, the bank's main shareholder, Banque Belgolaise, sold its shares in BCB to three independent banks, the Bank of Africa Group (BOA Group), the Belgian Investment Company for Developing Countries (BIO) and Banque Degroof. BIO made an initial investment of €1 million. The next month, BCB signed a partnership contract with the BOA Group.

In 2009 and 2010 BIO made additional investments of €230,000 and €832,000 respectively.

The BCB has been majority-owned by Bank of Africa (BOA) since 2010. BOA Group is Morocco's second largest private bank. The group provides strategic and operational support, and access to international markets through its presence in Europe, Asia and North America. In 2020 Degroof sold its shares in BCB to FAJAC, a new shareholder, BOA Group and BIO. BIO invested €1,053,568. As of 31 December 2022 the shareholders were:

BOA Group	24.22%
Société d'Assurances du Burundi	21.70%
Belgian Investment Company for Developing Countries (BIO)	20.78%
Republic of Burundi	11.93%
FAJAC	10.00%
Office du Thé du Burundi (OTB)	9.10%
Other shareholders	2.27%

The Republic of Burundi has a representative on the board of directors.

=== As BCB ===
BCB opened its first branch in the interior of the country in 1967 in Ngozi, which was booming due to the coffee business. Since then, BCB has continued to open branches in the provinces.

After integration into the BOA network in 2008, the bank continued to target large clients, but also began to actively collect deposits and expand the branch network.

BCB's balance sheet doubled in size between 2006 and 2014. As of 2020 BCB operated 21 branches, half of which were in Bujumbura. It is a full-service bank offering deposits, structured credit, treasury loans, documentary collection, transfers, currency exchange, and online banking. It provides debit and credit cards, and has ATMs.

In 2023 the bank had to deal with a revision of monetary policy, cessation of the renewal of refinancing, and alignment of rates on the foreign exchange markets, which exposed it to liquidity and foreign exchange risks. Despite this, it made a strong return with 19% growth in its balance sheet, which the managing director attributed to the new focus on SMEs.

In March 2024 the International Finance Corporation, a member of the World Bank Group, announced that it was lending BCB US$20 million to support BCB's target of becoming the leading bank for small and informal businesses in Burundi. US$10 million of the loan had been supplied by institutional investors. Formal and informal micro-, small-, and medium-sized enterprises (MSMEs) comprise more than 90% of firms in the country. The loan to BCB would let the bank give them better access to the capital they needed in order to grow.

== See also ==
- List of companies of Burundi
- List of banks in Burundi
- Economy of Burundi

== Sources ==
- Annual Report 2022 (PDF), Bank of Africa Group
- Banque de Crédit de Bujumbura, BIO, September 2020
- Brion, René; Moreau, Jean-Louis (October 2008), Inventaire des archives de la B.C.B. (Banque du Congo Belge) puis Banque du Congo puis B.C.Z. (Banque Commerciale Zaïroise) puis Banque Commerciale du Congo, de la Belgolaise (Banque Belgo-Congolaise) puis Belgolaise (Banque Belgo-Zaïroise) et de sociétés apparentées (PDF), BNP Paribas Fortis Historical Centre and Association pour la Valorisation des Archives d'Entreprises asbl
- Decret No. 100/112 du 23 Mars 2023 (in French), President of Burundi, 25 March 2023
- Historique de la BCB (in French), BCB
- IFC and Banque de Crédit de Bujumbura Partnership Boosts Financing for SMEs and Traders in Burundi, IFC, 11 March 2024
- "La BCB se réjouit des résultats enregistrés au cours de l'exercice 2023", Burundi Eco (in French), 12 April 2024
