= CRDB Bank Burundi =

Commercial bank in Burundi

Coordinates: 03°23′08″S 29°22′06″E

CRDB Bank Burundi S.A.
- Type: Private company: Subsidiary of CRDB Bank Group
- Industry: Financial services
- Founded: December 7, 2012; 13 years ago
- Headquarters: 1, Chaussée du Prince Louis Rwagasore, P.O BOX 254, Bujumbura, Burundi
- Key people: Hosea Ezekiel Kashimba, Chairperson; Fredrick Siwale, CEO
- Products: Loans, Transaction accounts, Savings, Investments, Debit Cards
- Revenue: ▲Aftertax:US$11,694,900 (TSh30.2 billion) (2023)
- Total assets: BIF 685 billion (US$ 334 million) (September 2022)
- Website: crdbbank.co.bi/en/

CRDB Bank Burundi, also CRDB Bank Burundi S.A., is a commercial bank in Burundi. It is licensed and supervised by the Bank of the Republic of Burundi, the central bank and national banking regulator. The commercial bank was established on 7 December 2012, as a 100 percent subsidiary of CRDB Bank Plc, based in neighboring Tanzania.

== Location ==
The headquarters and main branch of CRDB Bank Burundi S.A. are located at Chausee du Prince Louise Rwagasore 257, in the city of Bujumbura, Burundi's commercial capital.

== Overview ==
As of September 2022, the total assets of CRDB Bank Burundi were valued at 685 billion BIF (US$334 million).

== History ==
The bank was officially opened for business on 7 December 2012. It is a subsidiary of the Tanzanian financial services provider, CRDB Bank Plc. and is a component of the CRDB Bank Group, which includes CRDB Bank, CRDB Bank DR Congo and CRDB Insurance.

== Ownership ==
The shares of stock of CRDB Bank Burundi are 100 percent owned by CRDB Bank Plc, a Tanzanian financial services conglomerate, whose shares are traded on the Dar es Salaam Stock Exchange (DSE), under the symbol: CRDB.

== Governance ==
In March 2021, Bruce Mwile, the founding chief executive officer was promoted to Group Operating Officer and was replaced by Fredrick Siwale, as CEO of the Burundi subsidiary. As of December 2023, the Chairman of the five-person board of directors is Hosea Ezekiel Kashimba, one of the non-executive directors.

== See also ==
- List of companies of Burundi
- List of banks in Burundi
- Bank of the Republic of Burundi
- Economy of Burundi
