= FinBank =

FinBank or Finbank may refer to:

- FinBank Burundi, a commercial bank in Burundi
- FinBank Ghana, an international investment bank
- FinBank Nigeria, a commercial bank in Nigeria that was purchased and assimilated by First City Monument Bank
