= BIDF =

BIDF may refer to:

- Banque d'Investissement et de Developpement pour les Femmes, a commercial bank in Burundi.
- Birmingham International Dance Festival
