= Banque Nagelmackers =

Belgian private bank

Banque Nagelmackers nv

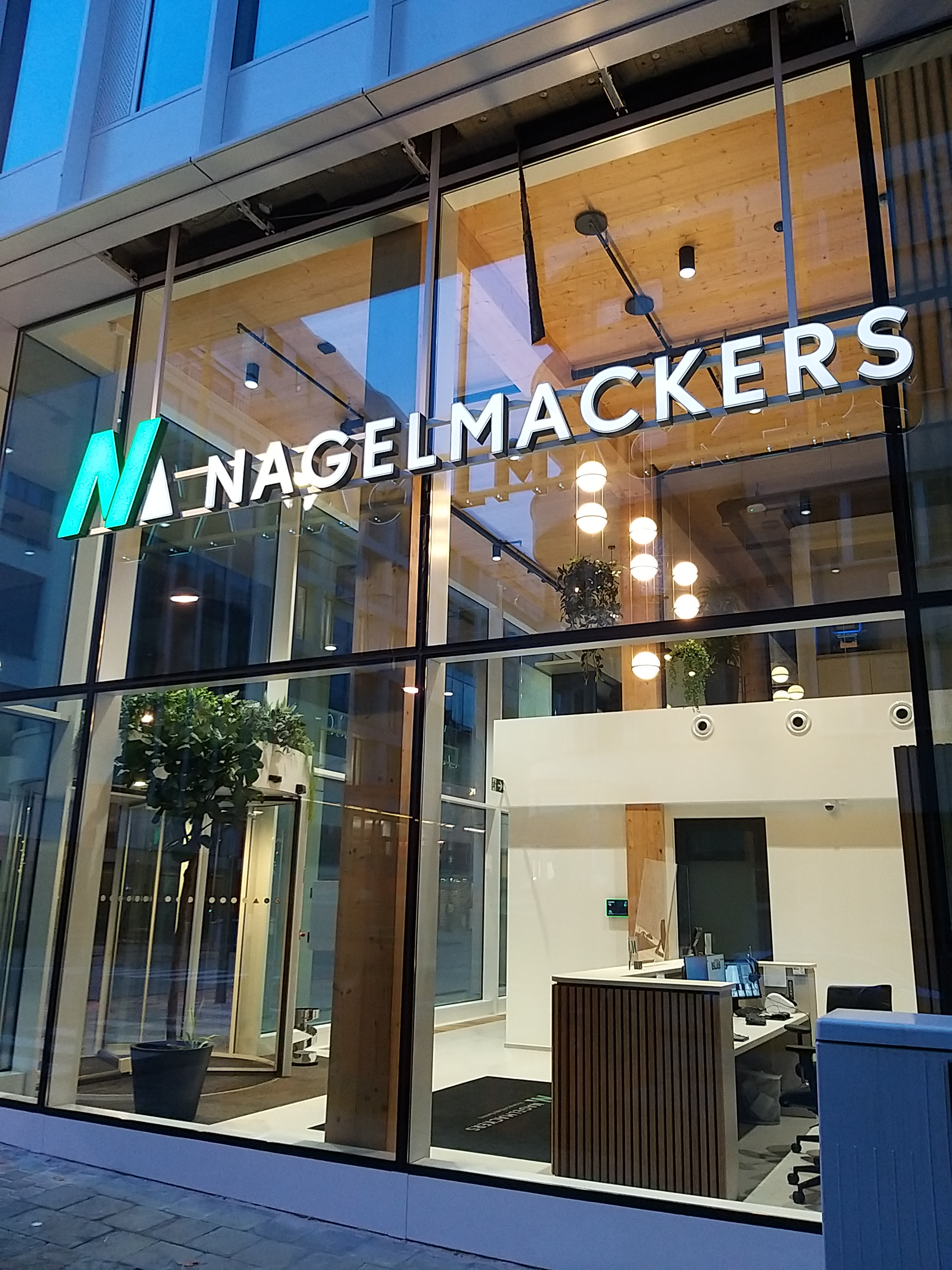
- Industry: Banking
- Founded: 1747; 279 years ago
- Founder: Pierre Nagelmackers
- Headquarters: Rue Montoyer 14, Brussels, Belgium
- Key people: Peggy Brione (CEO)
- AUM: 13,24 billion EUR
- Owner: Caisse d'Epargne Hauts de France (100%)
- Website: www.nagelmackers.be

Nagelmackers is a private bank in Belgium, the oldest in the country and the 14th oldest surviving bank in the world. It focuses on wealthy individuals and families, relying on a network of local offices. In July 2024, It was purchased from China's Anbang by Caisse d'Epargne Hauts de France, a local bank of Groupe BPCE in the Northern French region.

== History ==
Nagelmackers was founded in 1747 in Liège by Pierre Nagelmackers (1705-1780) and developed by his son Gérard Nagelmackers (1731-1798). In 1810, it purchased a building on Place de Louvain 12 in Brussels, which it had rebuilt in 1870 on a design by architect Antoine Trappeniers and eventually became its head office. The Nagelmackers family was instrumental in promoting the Liège International Exposition in 1905. In 1910, it was restructured into a partnership French: société en commandite simple under the name Nagelmackers Fils & Cie. In 1935, financier Paul de Launoit purchased shares in the bank from several members of the Nagelmackers family. It was rebranded Banque Nagelmackers 1747 in the 1970s, with reference to the date of its founding. By the late 1980s, it still kept its registered office (French: siège social) in Liège (Place de la Cathédrale 18), even though its main center of operations was in Brussels (Place de Louvain 12) with a third main seat in Namur (Rue des Dames Blanches 24).

After 243 years in independent operation, Nagelmackers went into several successive changes of ownership. In 1990, its banking business was acquired by Banque Nationale de Paris. In 1994, BNP in turn sold it to Belgian insurer P&V Verzekeringen. In 2001, P&V sold it to Dutch insurer Delta Lloyd, which in 2005 replaced the Nagelmackers brand with Delta Lloyd Bank. Also in 2005, Delta Lloyd sold the bank's operations in Luxembourg to Banque Degroof. In December 2014, Delta Lloyd announced the sale of its banking arm to Anbang, which closed the transaction a few months later and revived the Nagelmackers brand in October 2015. In 2022, amid a downsizing program, Banque Nagelmackers moved to a new head office on Rue Montoyer 14 in Brussels.

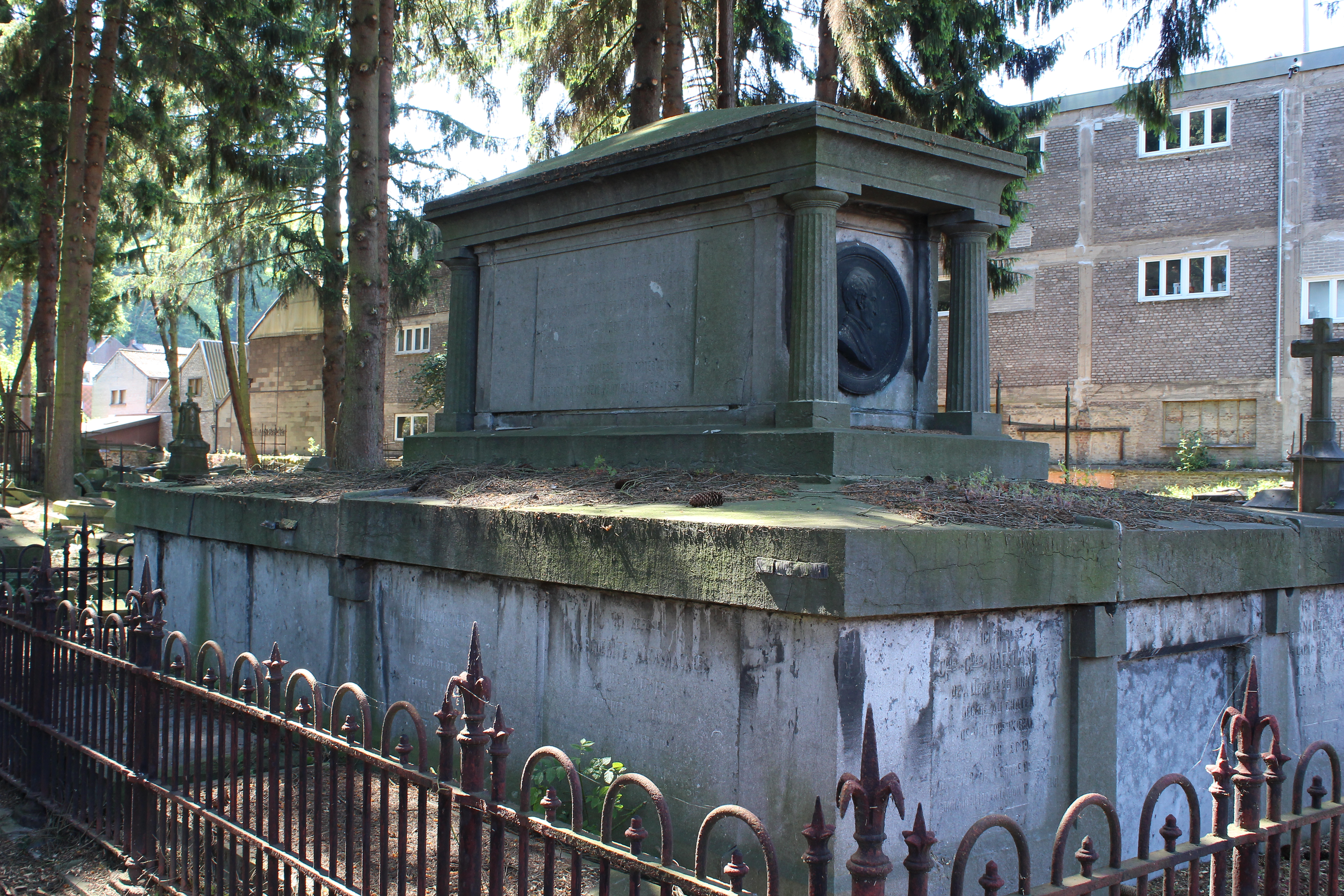
Family tomb of the Nagelmackers family in Angleur near Liège

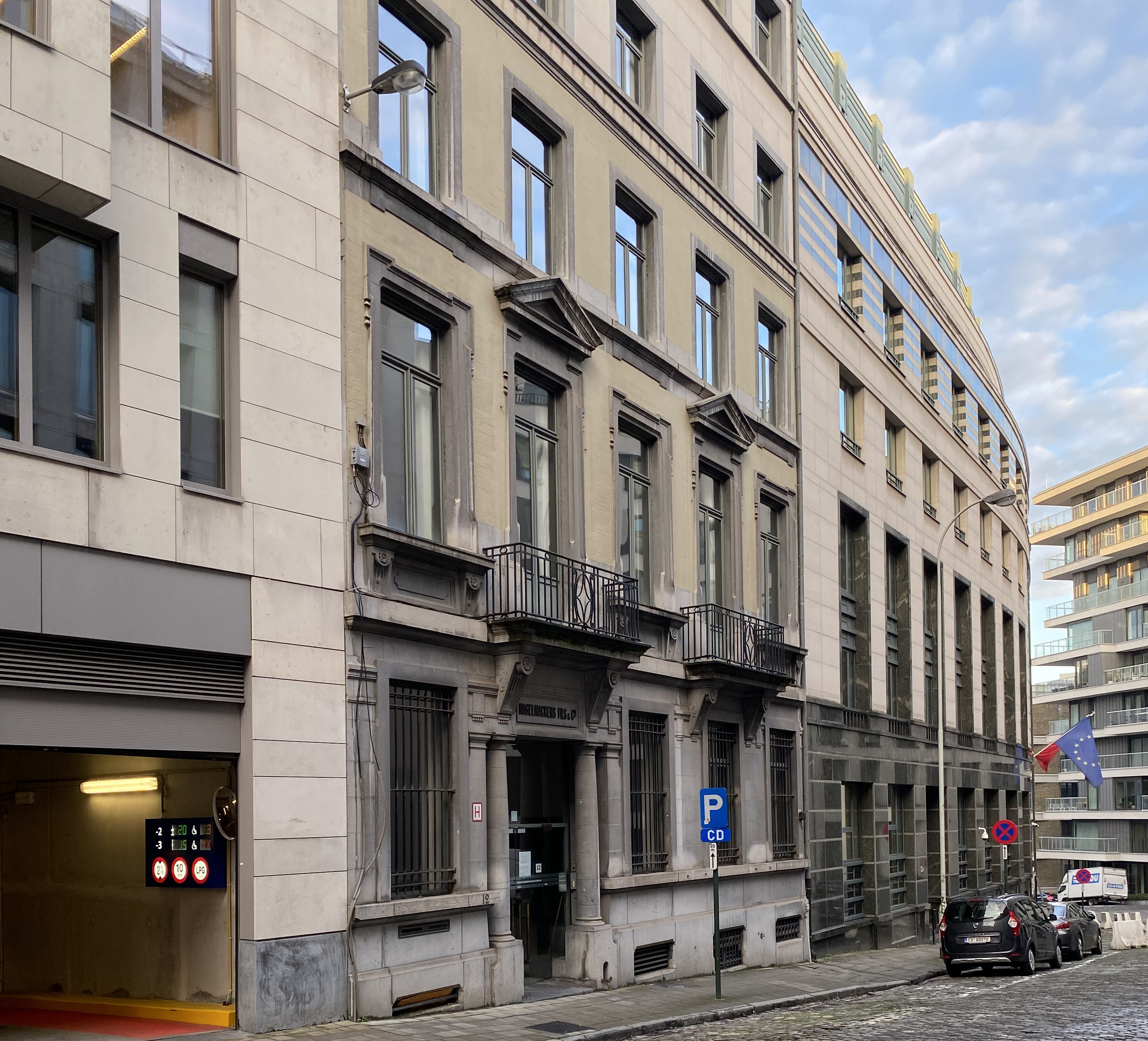
Building at Place de Louvain 12 in Brussels, the Brussels office of Nagelmackers until the 1990s

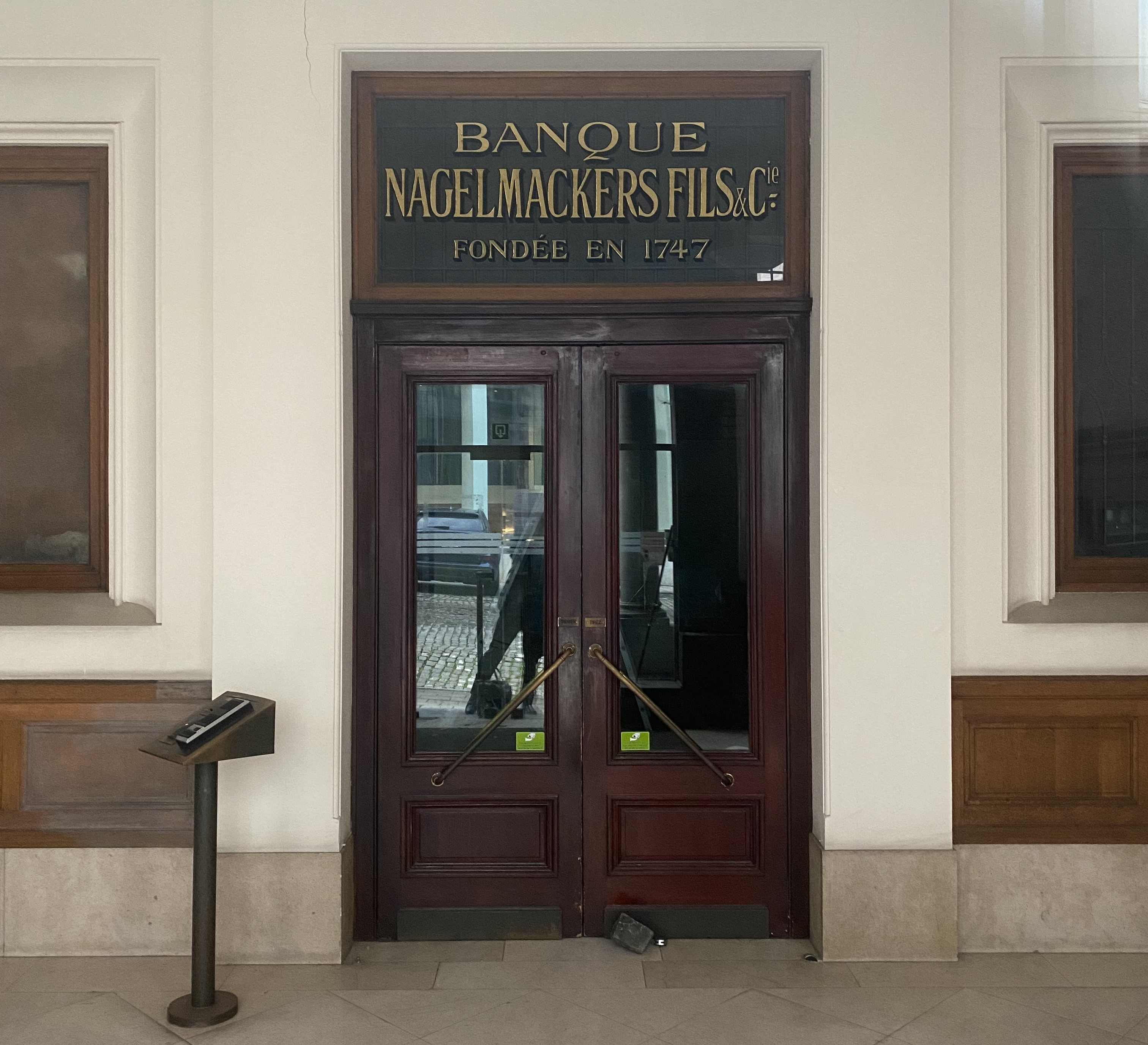
Entrance lobby at Place de Louvain 12

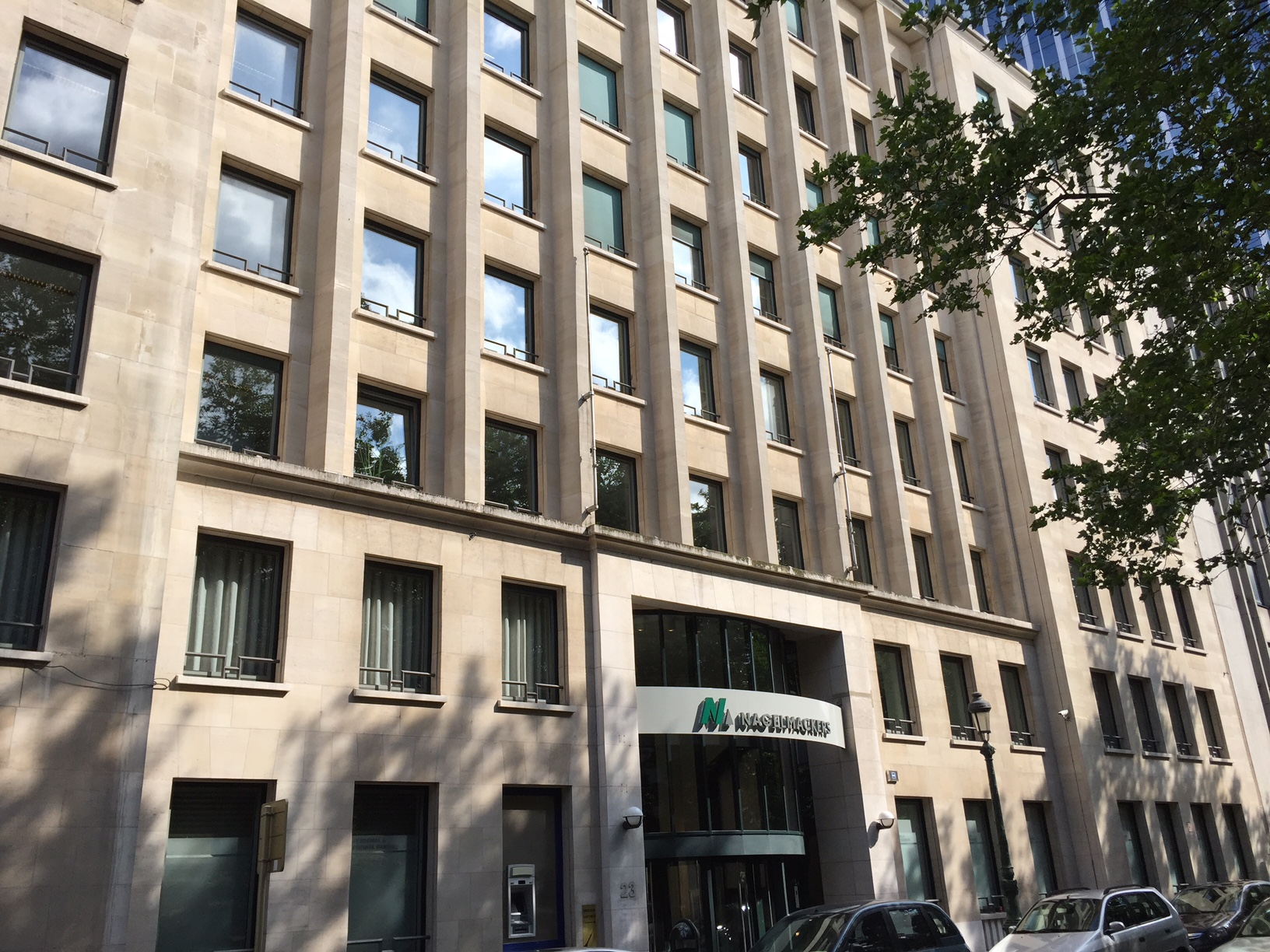
Building at Avenue de l'Astronomie 23 in Brussels, Nagelmackers head office from the 1990s until 2022

== Operations ==
As of mid-2021, Nagelmackers had 22 branches and 41 independent agents.

== See also ==
- Banque Liégeoise
- Georges Nagelmackers
- List of oldest banks in continuous operation
