= FinBank Burundi =

Burundian bank

Coordinates: 3.3846°S 29.3607°E

- Company type: Private
- Industry: Banking
- Founded: 18 April 2002
- Headquarters: 16, Boulevard de la Liberté, Bujumbura, Burundi
- Key people: Joe Dassin Rukundo, CEO
- Products: Pesaflash, Finconnect, Loans, savings, investments, mortgages
- Parent: Access Bank Group
- Headquarters (Burundi)
- Website: http://www.finbank.co.bi/

FinBank Burundi, also known as Finbank, is a commercial bank in Burundi, licensed by the Bank of the Republic of Burundi, the central bank and national banking regulator. The bank, established in 2002, was between 2008 and 2014 a subsidiary and a component of the Access Bank Group.

== Location ==
The headquarters of the bank are located at 16 Boulevard de la Liberté, in Bujumbura, the largest city and former capital of Burundi. The coordinates of the bank's headquarters are 16, Boulevard de la Liberté (commonly known as Route Rumonge).

== Overview ==
FinBank incorporated as a leasing finance company, under the name Finalease, in 2000. Two years later, it was granted a commercial banking license. It began commercial banking activities in 2003, changing its name to FinBank. In 2008, the Access Bank Group acquired majority shareholding in FinBank Burundi. In early 2014, Access Bank plc divested its interest in the bank to Dillux S.A, an investment company incorporated in Mauritius.

== Branch network ==
As of April 2016, FinBank Burundi maintained the following networked branches:

1. Head Office Branch – 16, Boulevard de la Liberté, Bujumbura - (+257) 22 24 32 06
2. Asiatique Branch – Avenue du Lac Tanganyika, Bujumbura - (+257) 22 25 88 96
3. Tokyo Branch – Avenue de l'OUA, Bujumbura - (+257) 22 90 10 44
4. Gitega Branch – Quartier Musinzira, Avenue du Commerce, Gitega - (+257) 22 40 44 82

Call center contacts - 170 (Free with Lumitel) or 76170170 (Econet)

== See also ==
- List of banks in Burundi
- List of companies of Burundi
- Economy of Burundi
