= CRDB Bank Group =

Financial services conglomerate based in Tanzania

- Type: Private Conglomerate
- Industry: Financial services
- Founded: 1996; 30 years ago
- Headquarters: Dar es Salaam, Tanzania
- Key people: Abdulmajid Nsekela; CRDB Group CEO and Managing Director
- Products: Banking and Insurance
- Website: Homepage

The CRDB Bank Group, is a privately owned conglomerate in Tanzania. The anchor company in the group is CRDB Bank Plc., the largest commercial bank in Tanzania, based on assets. As of 31 December 2023 CRDB Bank had assets valued at TSh10.897 trillion (US$4.313 billion).

== Overview ==
As of December 2023, CRDB Bank Group was involved in financial services, insurance and the delivery of social services. As of 31 December 2023, the group's total assets were valued at TSh:13.264 trillion (approx. US$:5,254 billion), with shareholders' equity worth TSh:1.774 trillion (approx. US$705 million). At that time, CRDB Bank Group was the largest financial services conglomerate in Tanzania.

== History ==
The anchor company of this group started in 1996 as Cooperative and Rural Development Bank (CRDB). It subsequently shortened its name to CRDB Bank. On 17 June 2009 the bank listed its shares of stock on the Dar es Salaam Stock Exchange (DSE).

In 2004, the bank established CRDB Microfinance Services Company (MFSC), a Tanzanian subsidiary active in the microfinance arena. MFSC does not lend directly but collaborates with "Savings and Credit Cooperative Societies (SACCOS), Savings and Credit Associations (SACAS), financial non-government organizations (NGOs), and Community Banks to disburse loans, provide technical support, and facilitate bank accounts".

The bank group established its subsidiary in Burundi on 7 December 2012, as CRDB Bank Burundi, a commercial bank. In May 2023, CRDB Bank Group established CRDB Insurance Company, another subsidiary, active in Tanzania.

In March 2022, the banking group declared ambitions to establish and/or acquire subsidiaries in Kenya, Uganda, Comoros, Malawi and Zambia. That ambition was reiterated in May 2024, with the list of countries increased to include Malawi and Rwanda.

In July 2023, the group opened a banking subsidiary in Lubumbashi, the Democratic Republic of the Congo, CRDB Bank DR Congo.

== Subsidiary companies ==
As of February 2024, the companies of the CRDB Bank Group included the following:

1. CRDB Bank Plc. a large commercial bank in Tanzania
2. CRDB Microfinance Services Limited
3. CRDB Bank Burundi, a commercial bank in Burundi
4. CRDB Bank DR Congo, a commercial bank in the Democratic Republic of Congo
5. CRDB Bank Foundation, the social services arm of the group, based in Tanzania
6. CRDB Insurance Company Limited, a Tanzanian general insurance company.

== Ownership ==
The shares of stock of the group are listed on the Dar es Salaam Stock Exchange, where they trade under the symbol: CRDB.

== See also ==
- List of conglomerates in Africa
