= Ruanda-Urundi franc =

Franc du Rwanda-Urundi (French); Ruanda-Urundese frank (Dutch); Amafaranga y'u Rwanda n'Uburundi (Kinyarwanda)
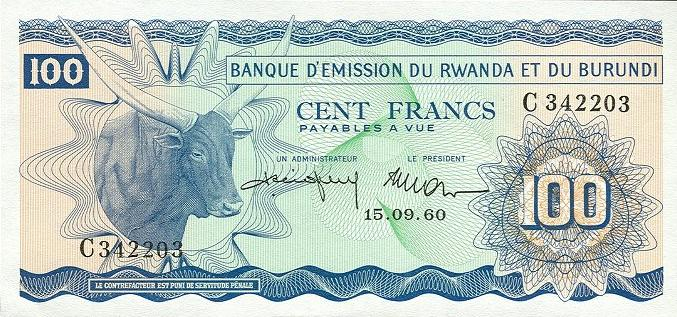
- 100 franc note

Unit
- Unit: franc
- Plural: francs
- Symbol: F

Denominations
- Subunit
- 1/100: centime
- Plural
- centime: centimes
- Symbol
- centime: c
- Banknotes
- Freq. used: 5, 10, 20, 50, 100, 500, 1000 F
- Coins
- Freq. used: 1 F

Demographics
- User(s): None, previously: Ruanda-Urundi (1960–62); Burundi (1962–64); Rwanda (1962–64)

Issuance
- Central bank: Banque d'Emission du Rwanda et du Burundi
- Mint: Royal Mint of Belgium
- This infobox shows the latest status before this currency was rendered obsolete.

The Ruanda-Urundi franc was a currency issued for the Belgian mandate territory of Ruanda-Urundi in 1960–62 which continued to circulate within its successor states of Rwanda and Burundi until 1964. The currency replaced the Belgian Congo franc which had also circulated in Ruanda-Urundi from 1916 to 1960 when the Belgian Congo became independent, leaving Ruanda-Urundi as the sole Belgian colonial possession in Africa. With the independence of Rwanda and Burundi in 1962, the shared Ruanda-Urundi franc continued to circulate until 1964 when it was eventually replaced by two separate national currencies.

== History ==
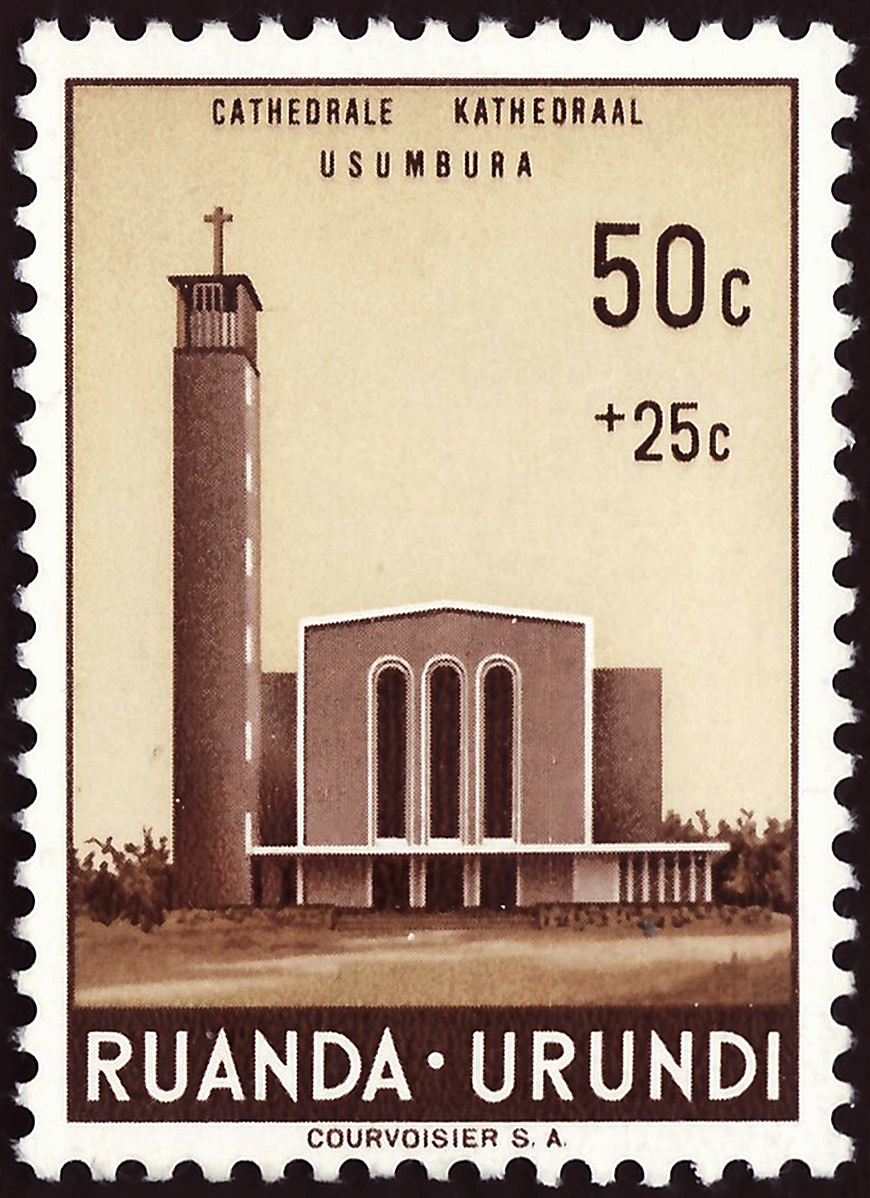
1961 stamp denominated in centimes of the Ruanda-Urundi franc. A 25 c surcharge was added to fund Usumbura Cathedral.

The franc became the currency of Rwanda and Burundi in 1916, when the two countries were occupied by Belgium and the Belgian Congo franc replaced the German East African rupie. In 1960, the Belgian Congo franc was replaced by the Ruanda-Urundi franc, issued by the Banque d'Émission du Rwanda et du Burundi (BERB). This circulated after independence until January 1964, when Rwanda and Burundi introduced their own currencies, the Burundian franc and the Rwandan franc.

== Coins ==
A single denomination was issued, the 1 franc, between 1960 and 1964.

== Banknotes ==
From 1960 to 1963, the BERB issued notes in denominations of 5, 10, 20, 50, 100, 500 and 1000 francs. In 1964, Burundi overprinted all of these denominations for use in Burundi, whilst Rwanda overprinted all but the 5 and 10 franc notes for use in Rwanda. Some notes were overprinted in 1961 for use as Katangese francs in the successionist state of Katanga in the Congo.
