= Royal Decree of 27 July 1887 =

The Royal Decree of 27 July 1887 was a rule of law signed by King Leopold II of Belgium, the then private owner of the Congo Free State, providing for the establishment of a monetary system for the free state and the introduction of a local currency, the Congolese franc, with a value set at 1/3100 of a kilo of 90% pure gold.

This decree was promulgated exactly 5 months after the Royal Decree of 27 February 1887 relating to commercial entities, which provided a legal operating framework for establishing companies to perform acts of a commercial nature, and the actions taken by these companies, while conducting business in the Congo Free State.

The present commercial law of the Democratic Republic of Congo can trace its origins to this decree.
