= Banque du Congo Belge =

Former bank in Africa

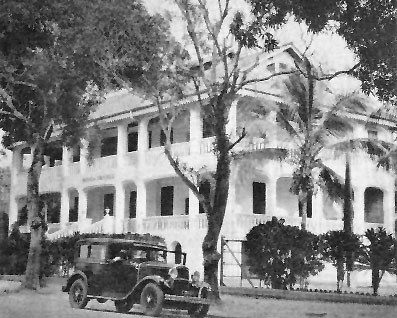
Head office of the Banque du Congo Belge in Léopoldville (now Kinshasa), photographed in 1942

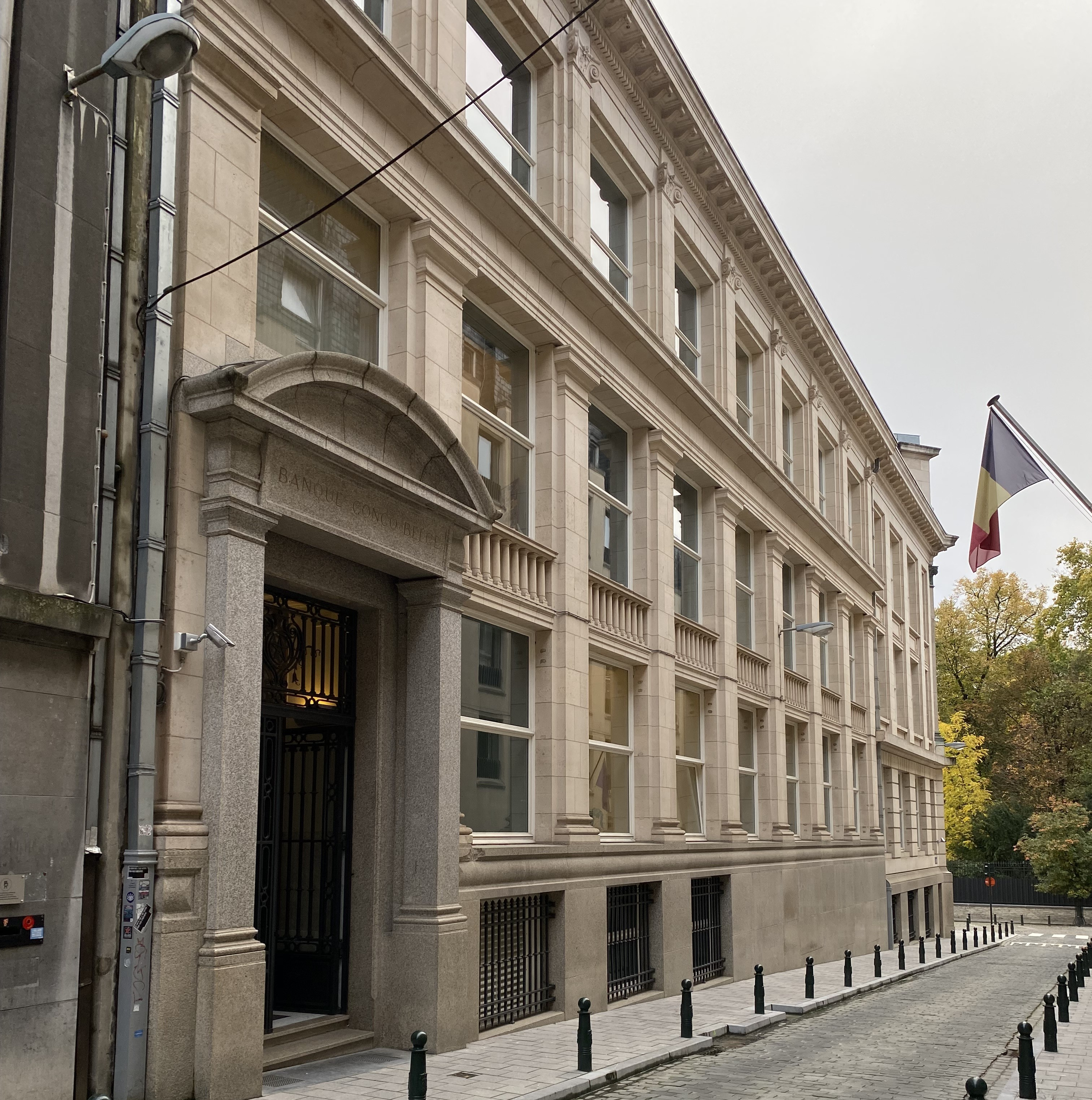
Former main administrative office of the Banque du Congo Belge in Brussels from 1920 to 1954

The Banque du Congo Belge (BCB, Dutch: Bank van Belgisch Congo; lit. 'Bank of the Belgian Congo') was a Belgian colonial bank that mainly operated in the Belgian Congo from 1909 to 1960. Following Congolese independence, it kept operating as the Banque du Congo from 1960 to 1971, the Banque Commerciale Zaïroise from 1971 to 1997, and the Banque Commerciale Du Congo (BCDC) from 1997 to 2020, when it was acquired by Kenya-based Equity Group Holdings and became part of Equity Banque Commerciale du Congo.

The BCB was the bank of issue in the Belgian Congo from 1911 to 1952 and in Ruanda-Urundi from 1916 to 1952. It was succeeded in that role in 1952 by the newly established Banque Centrale du Congo Belge et du Ruanda-Urundi. Its operations in Belgium were spun off in 1960 as Banque Belgolaise. Its commercial operations in Burundi were also spun off in 1964 and became the Banque de Crédit de Bujumbura.

== Background ==
From 1886 to 1908, King Leopold II of the Belgians ruled the Congo Free State as his private domain. On July 27, 1887, he issued a Royal decree that established the Belgian franc as the money of account for the Congo Free State and for Ruanda-Urundi. In 1890, the Heligoland-Zanzibar Treaty put Ruanda-Urundi within the German Empire's sphere of influence in Africa. Consequently, the German East African rupie became the official currency in Ruanda-Urundi though the franc continued to circulate there. The Free State's decision not to create a dedicated currency has been explained by the concern to preserve barter arrangements which were beneficial to Belgian merchants, as well as the fear that a more monetized economy would create pressures to end the regime of forced labour on which the colony relied heavily.

In 1908, Belgium assumed direct responsibility for the Congo, taking it from Leopold and thus creating the conditions for the introduction of a colonial monetary system.

== Colonial bank ==
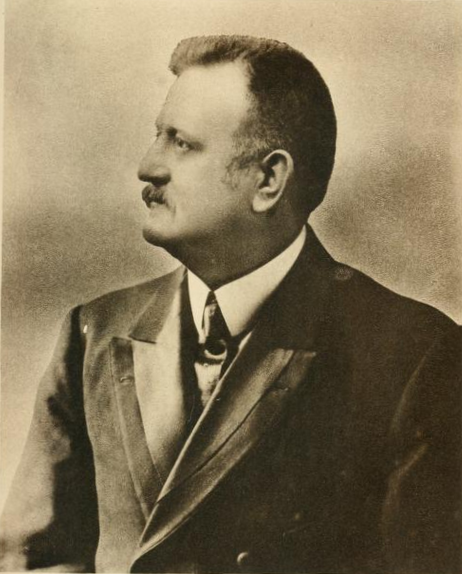
Albert Thys was instrumental in the establishment of the Banque du Congo Belge

The Banque du Congo Belge was founded on 11 January 1909 at the initiative of Albert Thys and the Banque d'Outremer he led, by a number of institutions, including the Compagnie du Congo pour le Commerce et l'Industrie (CCCI), the Banque de Bruxelles, the Bunge trading house, and several private banking firms including the Banque Lambert. After a few weeks and at the request of the Belgian authorities, the capital of the new bank was further opened to established Belgian financial institutions that included the Société Générale de Belgique (SGB), Crédit Général Liégeois, Crédit Général de Belgique, Banque Internationale de Bruxelles, the Balser banking house, and the Société Commerciale et Financière Africaine (Comfina). As a result, the main shareholders of the BCB in 1909 were the CCCI, the Banque d'Outremer, the SGB, the Comfina, Édouard Empain, the Banque de Bruxelles, De Nederlandsche Bank, and banker Franz Philippson.

As such, the BCB was initially able to act as the agent in the Congo for all the major Belgian banks rather than as a subsidiary or affiliate of only one of them, similarly to its French forerunners the Banque de l'Indochine and Banque de l'Afrique Occidentale. Its Brussels office was established in the office complex of the CCCI and in the same urban block as the Banque d'Outremer. In June 1909, it opened its first Congolese branch in Matadi, followed by Elisabethville (now Lubumbashi) four months later and Léopoldville (now Kinshasa) in 1910.

On 7 July 1911, the Colonial government awarded the bank a 25-year monopoly on the right of note issuance for the Colony and appointed it as fiscal agent for the colonial government. The granting of issuance privilege triggered a change in the governance of the BCB, which remained a Belgian joint-stock company but granted the Belgian government oversight rights; until 1937, the chairman of the BCB's board was a senior executive of the National Bank of Belgium. On 10 August 1911, the same day of the enactment of the BCB's new statute, it created a local affiliate, the Banque Commerciale du Congo, which took over its commercial activities that it could no longer itself carry out under the terms of the issuance charter. The BCB soon opened further branches in Boma and Stanleyville (now Kisangani), and issued its first banknotes in 1912. It was still modest in size, however, with a total 25 employees in 1911. It kept outsourcing the printing of banknotes to the National Bank of Belgium until May 1940.

With the German occupation of Belgium during World War I, the BCB was run from a temporary branch created for that purpose in London. It created 18 new branches during the war period, in Bandundu, Basankusu, Basoko, Buta, Coquilhatville (now Mbandaka), Inongo, Kabinda, Kasongo, Kilo-Moto, Kongolo, Libenge, Lisala, Luebo, Lusamba, Niangara, Ponthierville (now Ubundu), Rutshuru, and Sandoa. In the occupied German colonies of east Africa, it also opened offices in Kigoma and Dar es Salaam.

Following Germany's defeat in the First World War, Belgium assumed a League of Nations mandate over Ruanda-Urundi. Belgium then included them in the Congo Franc Zone, and the BCB opened branches in Usumbura and Kigali. The Convention of 10 October 1927 updated the BCB's statute, revisited the question of note issuance and extended the BCB's monopoly until 1 July 1952; a further update of the statute took place in 1935.

During the Second World War, Belgium came again under German occupation. As a consequence, the BCB had to act practically as an autonomous central bank, including as a fiscal agent of the Belgian government in exile. A convention of 21 January 1941 between Belgium (in exile) and the United Kingdom set a fixed parity between the Congo franc and the pound sterling and allowed the former to be quoted in London.

In 1952, upon expiration of its banknote issuance privilege, the BCB was replaced in its central banking role by the newly established Banque Centrale du Congo Belge et du Ruanda-Urundi (BCCBRU). On this occasion, its registered office was relocated from Brussels to Léopoldville on 16 September 1952, and it absorbed its local affiliate, the Banque Commerciale du Congo, on 19 November 1952.

In 1954, the BCB's office in Brussels moved from its longstanding location at Rue Thérésienne 14, part of the palatial building of CCCI completed in 1920, to a new head office on Cantersteen 1 above the North–South connection in central Brussels, designed by architects André and Jean Polak.

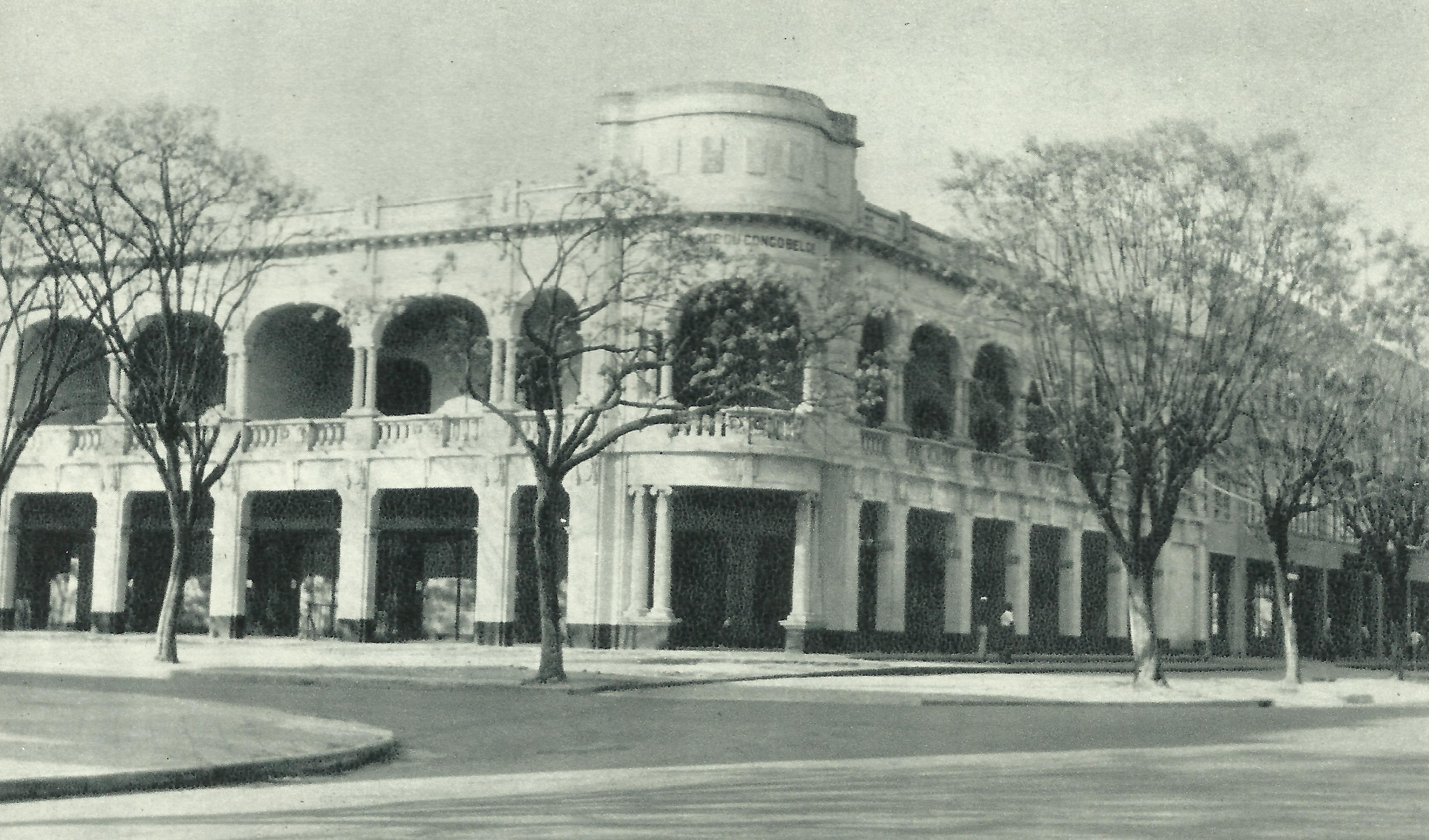
Branch in Elisabethville, photographed in 1926

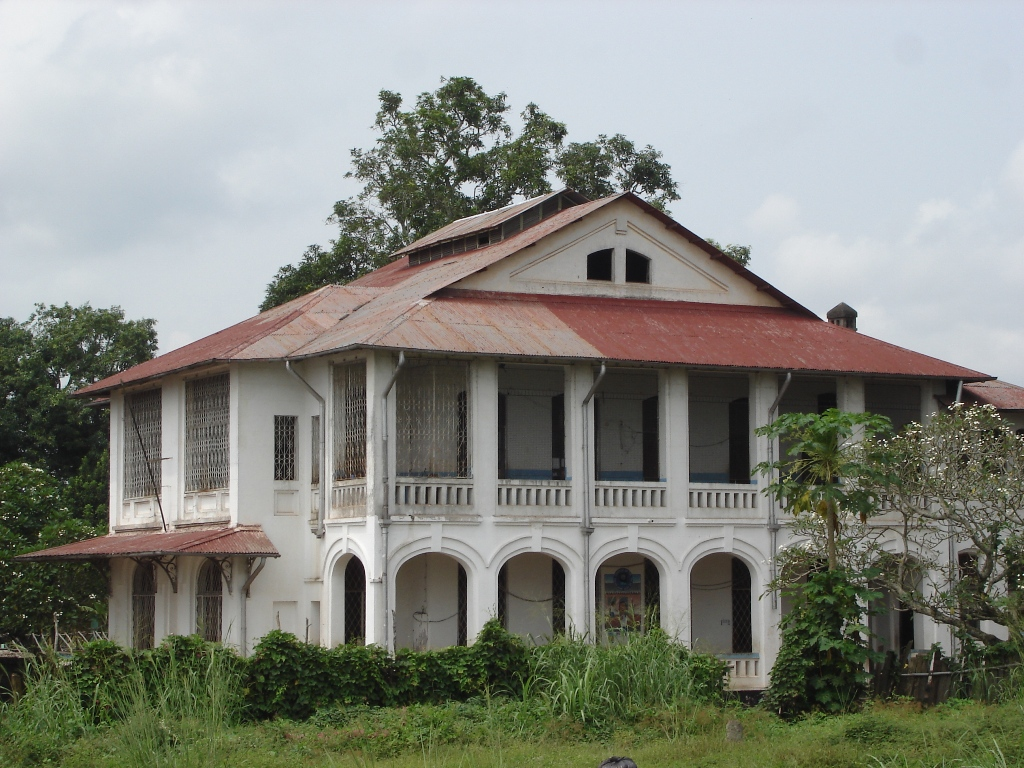
Former building of Banque du Congo Belge in Mbandaka

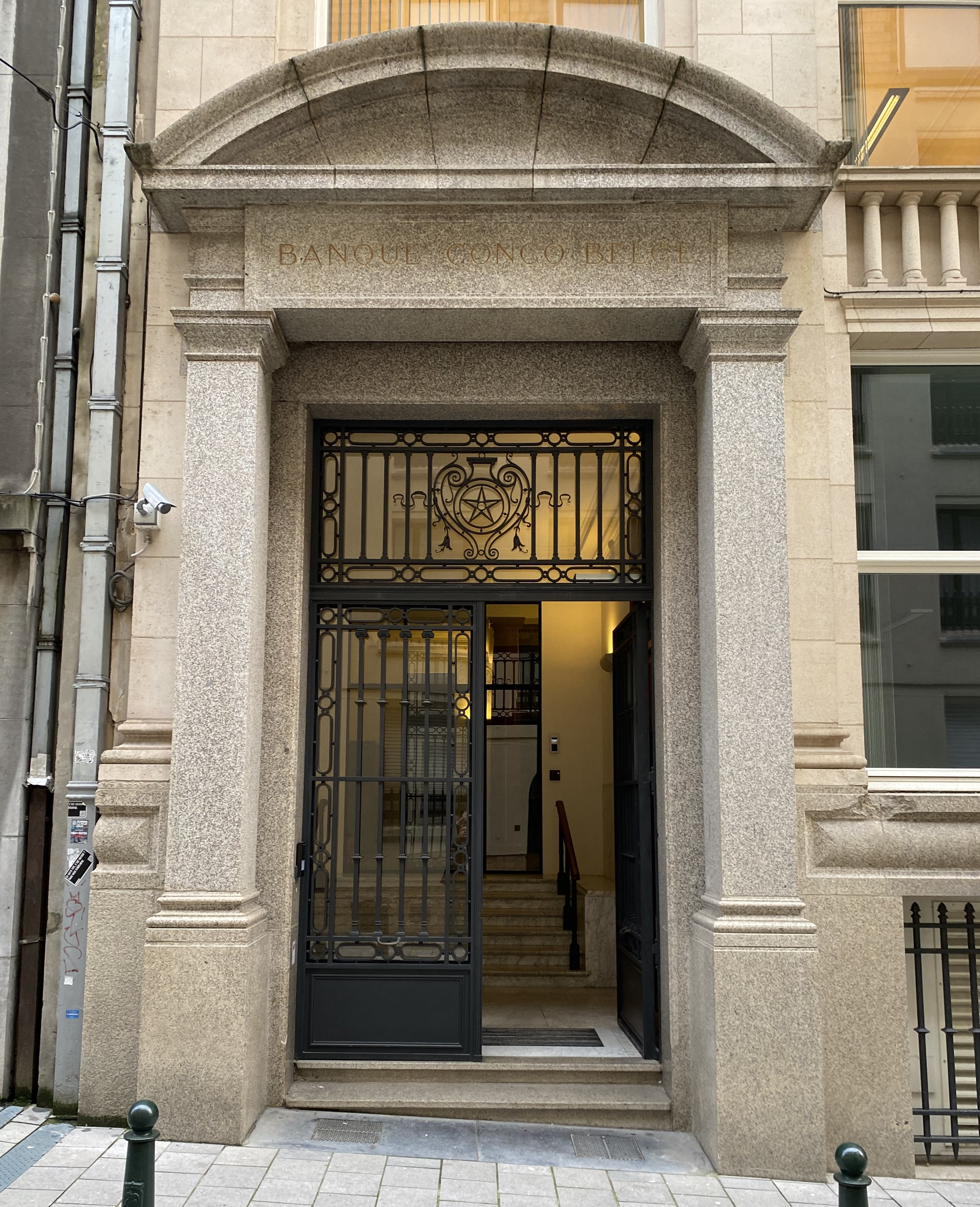
Entrance of the bank's former Brussels office with inscription "Banque Congo Belge" and ironwork displaying the Congo Star

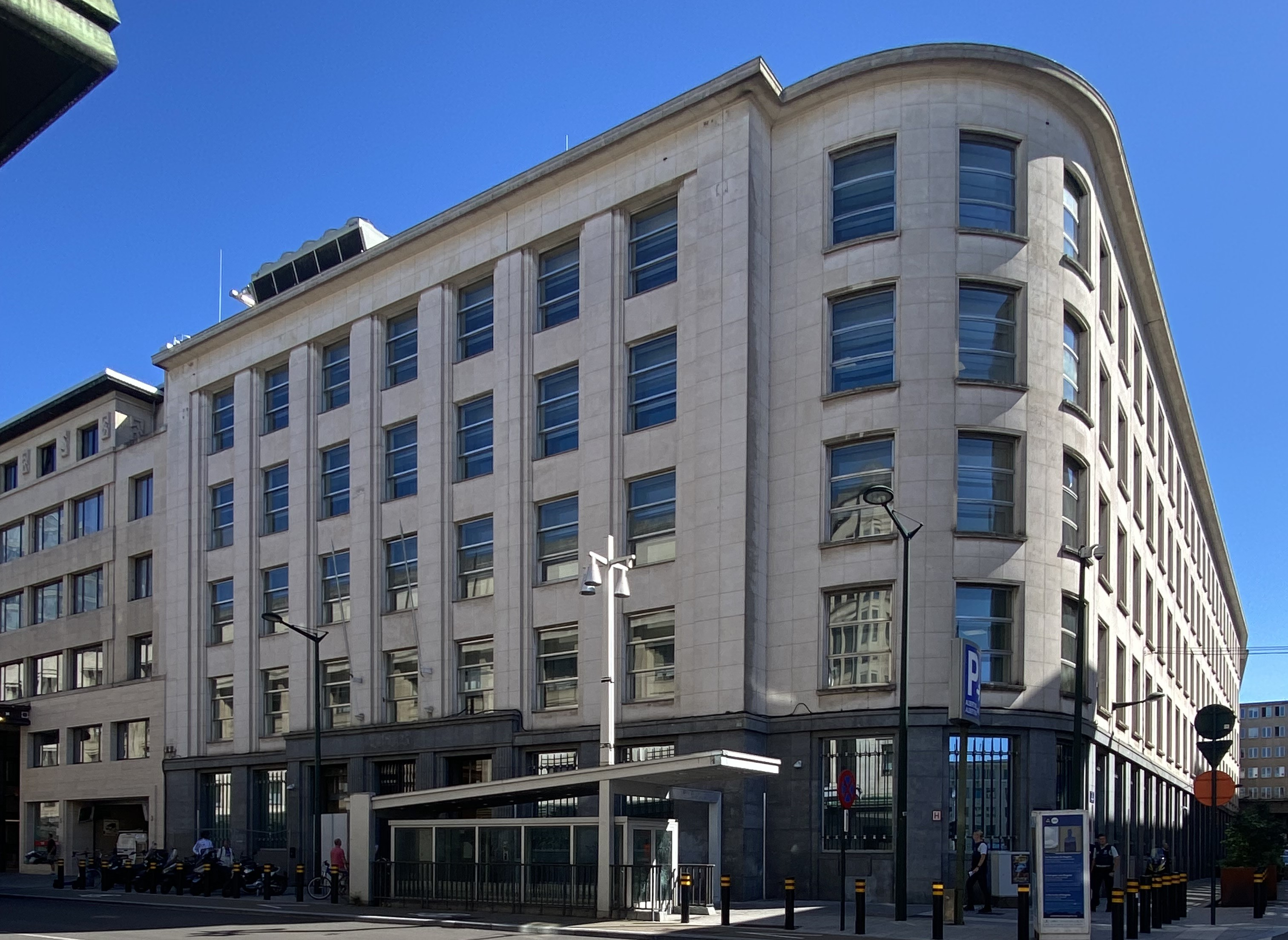
Cantersteen 1 in Brussels, BCB main Brussels office from 1954 to 1960

== Post-colonial era ==
With Congolese independence impending in 1960, the BCB adapted its corporate structure. On 14 April 1960 it formed a new Belgian bank, the Banque Belgo-Congolaise (abbreviated in 1965 as Banque Belgolaise), which took over the BCB's existing operations in Brussels, Antwerp, and London. In June 1960, it transferred most central administrative functions from Brussels to Léopoldville. On 24 August 1960, the BCB renamed itself the Banque du Congo. Simultaneously, the bank accelerated the elevation of native Africans within its staff, raising their share in management from 10 percent in early 1960 to 30 percent in early 1961 and over 40 percent by the end of 1963. This helped it to re-open by early 1964 all branches that had to be closed in the previous few years during the Congo Crisis.

On 8 August 1964, the bank's operations in what had become Burundi and Rwanda were reorganized as the Banque de Crédit de Bujumbura, which was subsequently acquired in 1965 by Banque Belgolaise.

In late 1963, Morgan Guaranty International Banking Corporation, an affiliate of Morgan Guaranty created in 1960, took a minority stake in the Banque du Congo. In 1965, it allowed the Congolese state to also become a minority shareholder through a capital increase. In early 1970, the Banque du Congo became a founding shareholder of the newly established Société Congolaise de Financement et de Dévéloppement, known as Socofide.

The bank was renamed Banque Commerciale Zaïroise when the country's name was changed to Zaire in 1971. By 1987 it was still by far the largest bank in the country, ahead of the Société Congolaise de Banque (by then branded "Banque du Peuple") and the Union Zaïroise de Banques. With the collapse of the country's economy and the start of the First Congo War in 1996, the bank sharply reduced the size of its activities. Its name was again changed in late 1997, to Banque Commerciale Du Congo (the same name as the BCB's commercial banking affiliate from 1911 to 1952), acronymized as BCDC.

In 2004, taking advantage of the improved socio-political climate and the subsequent economic upturn, BCDC redeployed its network throughout the country and adapted its sales organization. BCDC became a bank of reference in the DRC, active throughout the country. From 2009, it was controlled by businessman George Arthur Forrest. By year-end 2016, it earned $11 million US dollars before tax, making it the highest income in 15 years. In 2017, BCDC operated twenty three branches in seventeen cities in the DRC, including 10 in Kinshasa, 4 in the former Katanga Province, and one in each of the following cities: Aru, Beni, Boma, Bukavu, Bunia, Butembo, Durba, Goma, Kananga, Kimpese, Kisangani, Lukala, Matadi, Mbuji-Mayi and Isiro.

On 9 September 2019, Kenya-based Equity Group Holdings announced that it had acquired a controlling stake in BCDC from George Forrest. In December 2020, Equity Group, having received regulatory approval from the DR Congolese regulators, began the process of merging BCDC with its existing local subsidiary Equity Bank Congo (EBC), to form Equity Banque Commerciale du Congo (Equity BCDC). Equity Group maintained 77.5 percent shareholding in the merged entity.

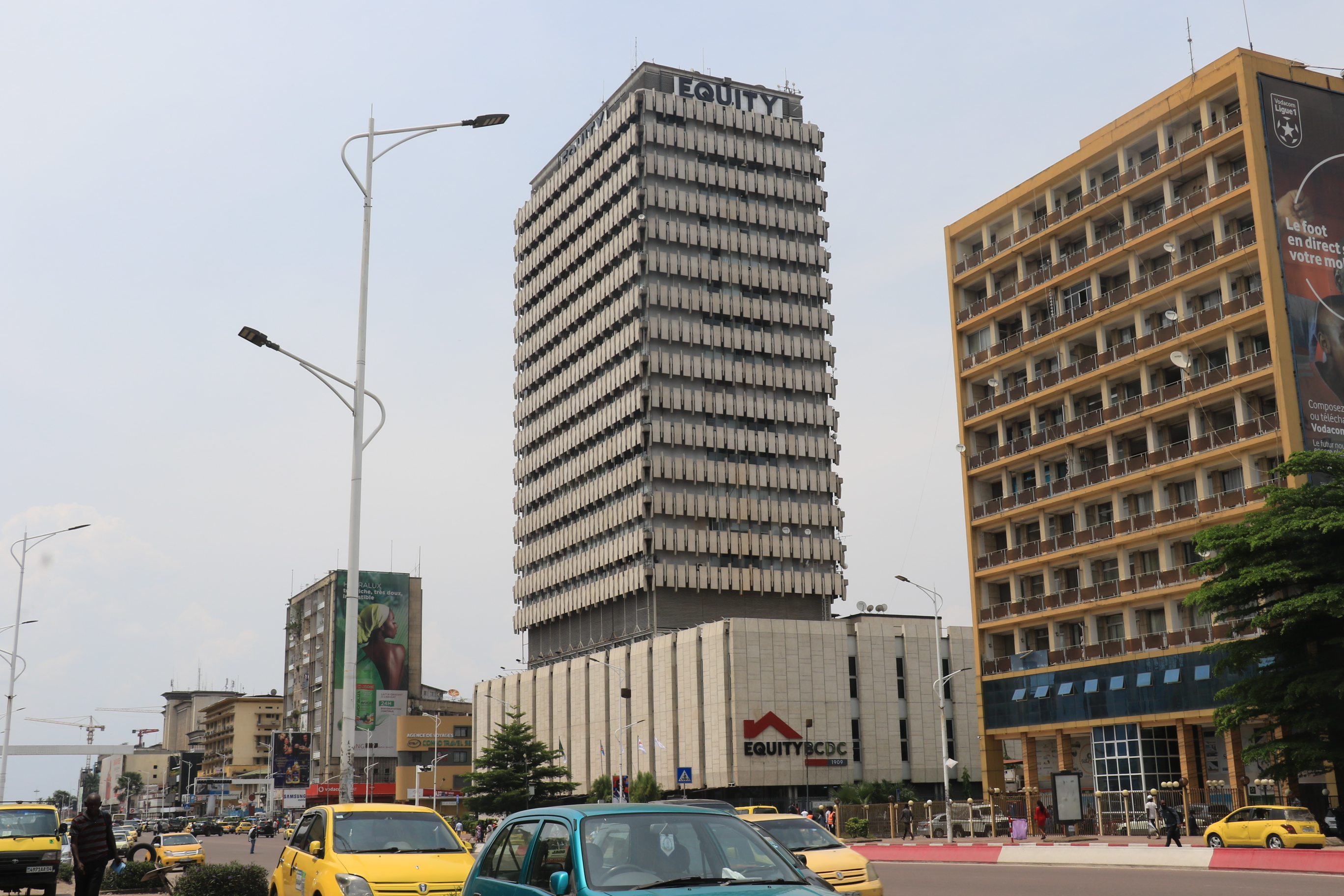
Head office building in Kinshasa, completed in 1975

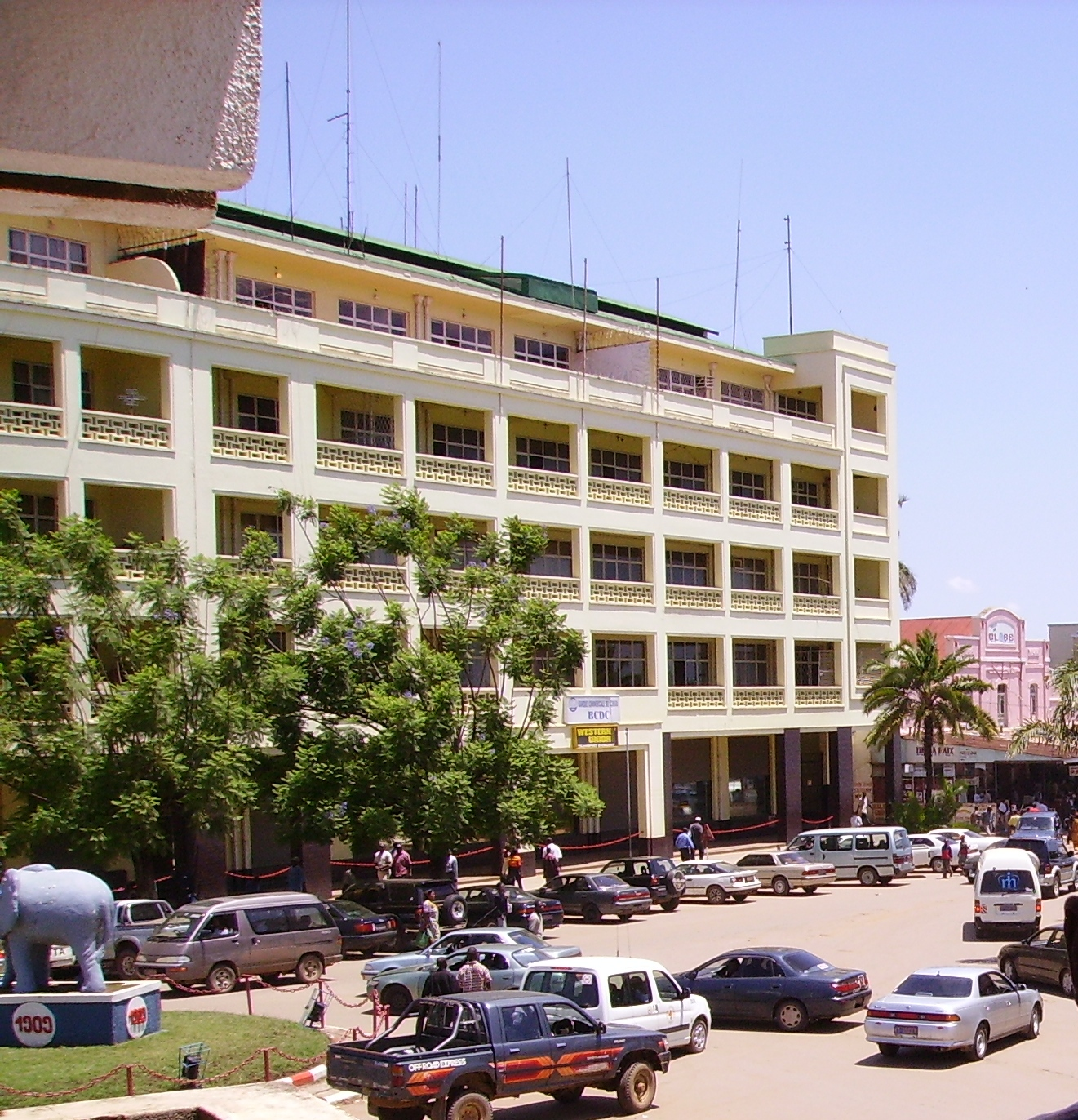
Branch in Lubumbashi (2008)

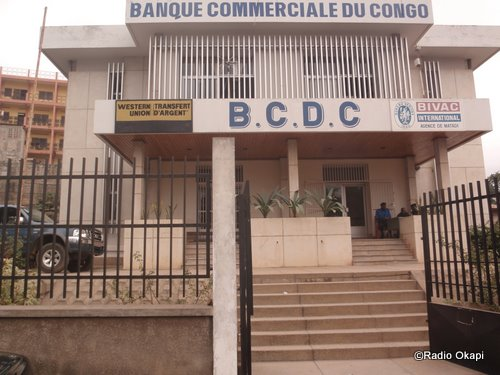
Branch in Matadi (2020)

== Leadership ==
Chairs of the Board:

- Omer Lepreux, 1909-1927
- Louis Franck, 1927-1937
- Paul Charles, 1938-1951
- Pierre de Bonvoisin, 1951-1960?

== See also ==
- Banque Belge d'Afrique
- Société Congolaise de Banque
- Banque de l'Afrique Occidentale
- Banco Nacional Ultramarino
- List of banks in Belgium
