= Banque d'Investissement et de Développement pour les Femmes =

Women's Investment and Development Bank
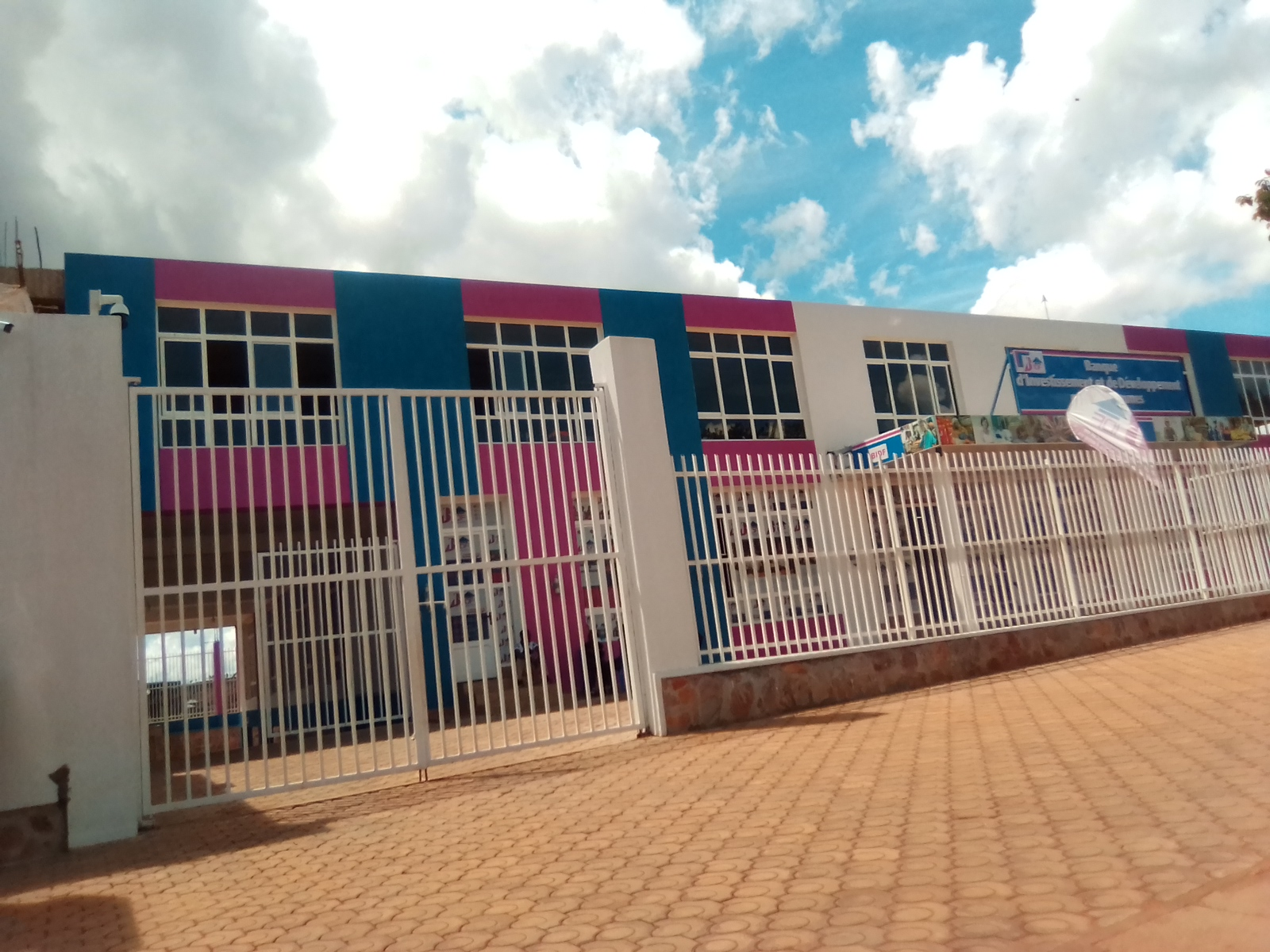
- Gitega headquarters
- Trade name: BIDF
- Native name: Banque d'investissement et de Developpement pour les Femmes
- Founded: July 13, 2021; 5 years ago in Gitega, Burundi
- Headquarters: Gitega, Burundi
- Key people: Marie Salomé Ndabahariye, CEO
- BIDF Headquarters (Burundi)
- Website: bidf.bi

The Women's Investment and Development Bank (French: Banque d'investissement et de Developpement pour les Femmes, BIDF) is a commercial bank in Burundi. It was founded in 2021 with headquarters in Gitega.

== Foundation ==
The bank was authorized by decree Ni100/72 of 8 May 2020, with the ministers of finance and the interior charged with its implementation. The constitutive general meeting of the BIDF shareholders was held in Gitega on 24 February 2021 at a meeting attended by Imelde Sabushimike, Minister for Gender Promotion, and Domitien Ndihokubwayo, Minister of Finance. The statutes of the BIDF company were unanimously adopted, and it was agreed that the Minister of Finance would represent the company until the governing bodies of the BIDF had been appointed.

The Women's Investment and Development Bank was officially opened by Evariste Ndayishimiye, President of Burindi, on 3 March 2022. It was located in Gitega, the political capital of Burundi, beside the Youth Investment Bank (Banque d’Investissement pour les Jeunes, BIJE). The bank had a starting capital of 10 billion BIF and is owned 85% by the communes and 15% by the central government of Burundi.

President Ndayishimiye said that traditional banks wait for investors to seek them out, rather than seeking investors. The banks reject poorly designed projects, but should be helping to design bankable projects. The managing director said that the bank would grant low-interest loans to support projects of women's cooperatives and associations. It would also support development projects that can provide jobs to several people, particularly in agriculture, livestock, fishing, industry, crafts, public transport and technology. The bank would help implement the projects and provide management training sessions.

== Expansion ==
In February 2024 the bank opened its first branch, the "Imfura agence", in Bujumbura Mairie. The first lady of Burundi, Angeline Ndayishimiye, presided over the ceremony. She noted that the bank had opened over 2,145 accounts by the end of 2023, more than 80% by women, helping over 21,000 women. More than 10 billion BIF had been advanced as credits in the women-oriented "investment window" and in the commercial sector, which was also open to men.

== See also ==
- List of companies of Burundi
- List of banks in Burundi
- Economy of Burundi

== Sources ==
- Bigirimana, Raphaël (24 February 2021), Création officielle de la Banque de développement pour les femmes (BIDF) (in French)
- Bigirimana, Joella (4 March 2022), "Va-t-elle réellement financer les femmes ?", Iwacu (in French)
- Décret n°100/072 du 8 mai 2020 portant Participation de l’Etat du Burundi et des Communes au Capital de la Banque d’Investissement et de Développement pour les Femmes au Burundi “BIDF” en sigle (in French)
- "Inauguration de la Banque d'investissement et de développement pour les femmes", ABP (in French), 4 March 2022
- Maniragaba, Mélance (4 March 2022), "La BIDF pour stimuler la compétition dans le secteur bancaire", Burundi Eco (in French)
- Ndikuriyo, Appolinaire (15 February 2024), "Ouverture d'une agence de la BIDF en mairie de Bujumbura : Appuyer les projets de développement des femmes burundaises", Le Renouveau (in French)
