= Banque Belgolaise =

Former Belgian bank

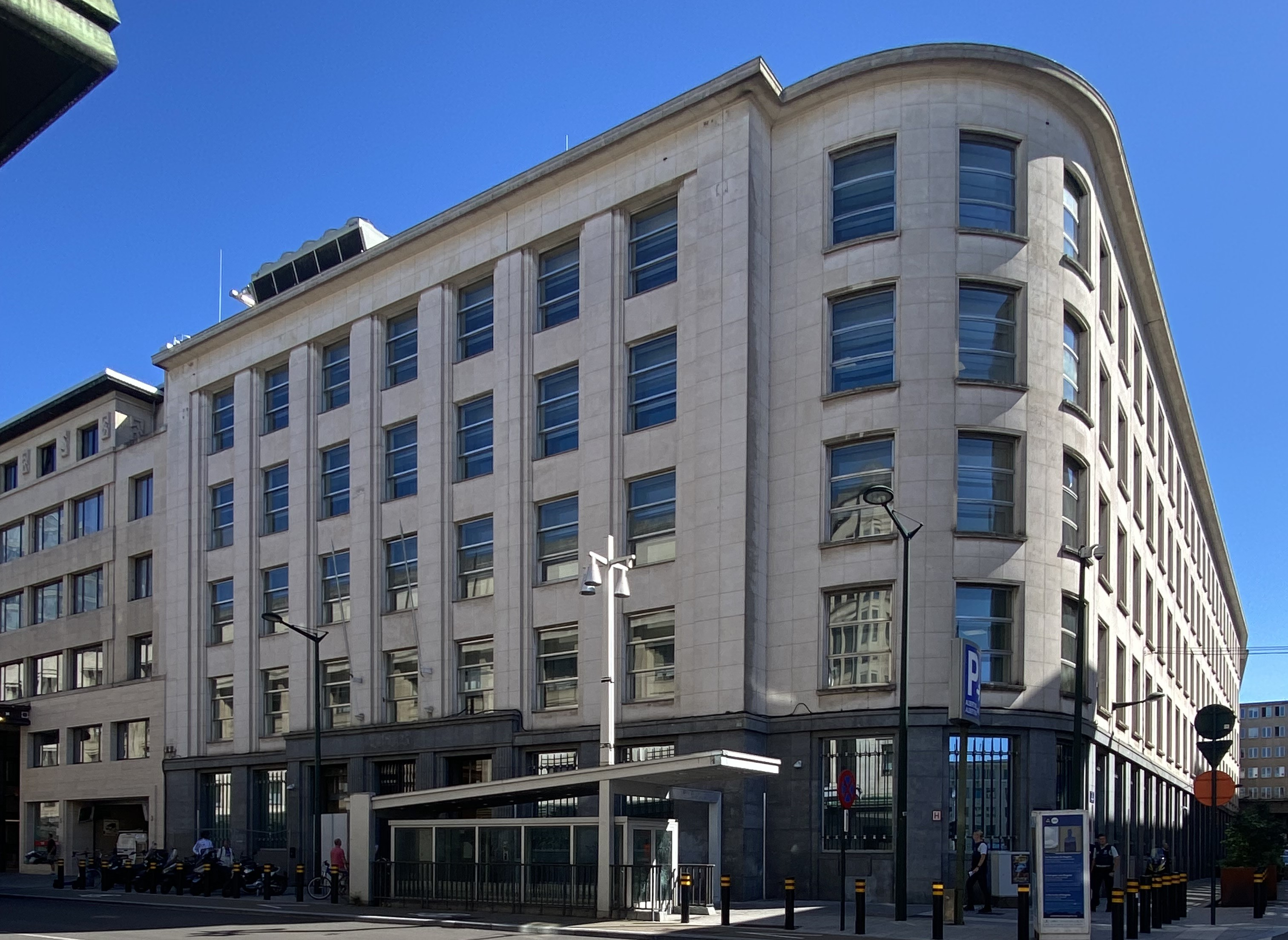
Building at Cantersteen 1 in Brussels, Brussels office of Banque du Congo Belge from 1954 to 1960, then head office of Banque Belgolaise

The Banque Belgo-Congolaise, abbreviated in 1965 as Banque Belgolaise, was a Brussels-based Belgian bank spun off in 1960 from the Banque du Congo Belge in the context of forthcoming Congolese independence. While retaining the brand Belgolaise, its registered name was changed to Banque Belgo-Zaïroise S.A. after 1971. It ceased operations in 2012 as it was wound down by its then owner BNP Paribas Fortis.

== Overview ==
Ahead of the Belgian Congo's independence, the Banque du Congo Belge (BCB) restructured its European activities on 14 April 1960 into the newly formed Banque Belgo-Congolaise, with seat in Brussels. On 21 May 1965, the bank's name was abbreviated as "Belgolaise".

Also in 1965, Belgolaise purchased the Banque de Crédit de Bujumbura which the BCB, by then renamed the Banque du Congo, had endowed the year before with its operations in what had become Burundi and Rwanda. In late 1966, Belgolaise separated the Rwandan activities into the Bank of Kigali, in which it took an equity stake of 40 percent.

Banque Belgolaise expanded into other African markets in the late 1980s and 1990s. In the late 1990s, together with other former banking activities of the Société Générale de Belgique, it became part of Fortis Group.

In 2005 Fortis announced it was selling the bank, but it was unable to find a buyer and started to liquidate it, closing the London and Paris branches in 2006. The liquidation was continued by BNP Paribas following its acquisition of Fortis in 2008, substantially completed in 2012, and finalized in 2018.

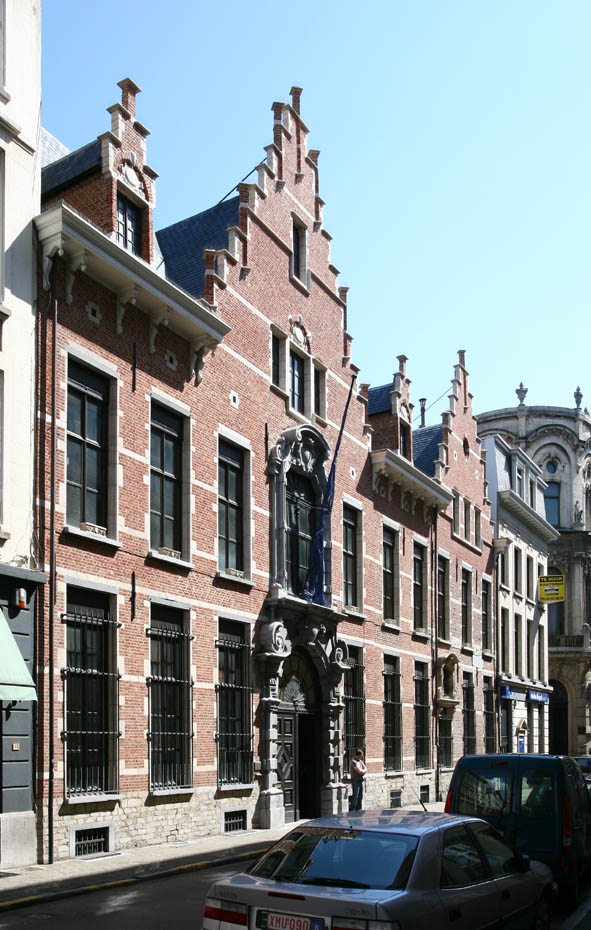
Building at Arenbergstraat 17 in Antwerp, former local Belgolaise branch

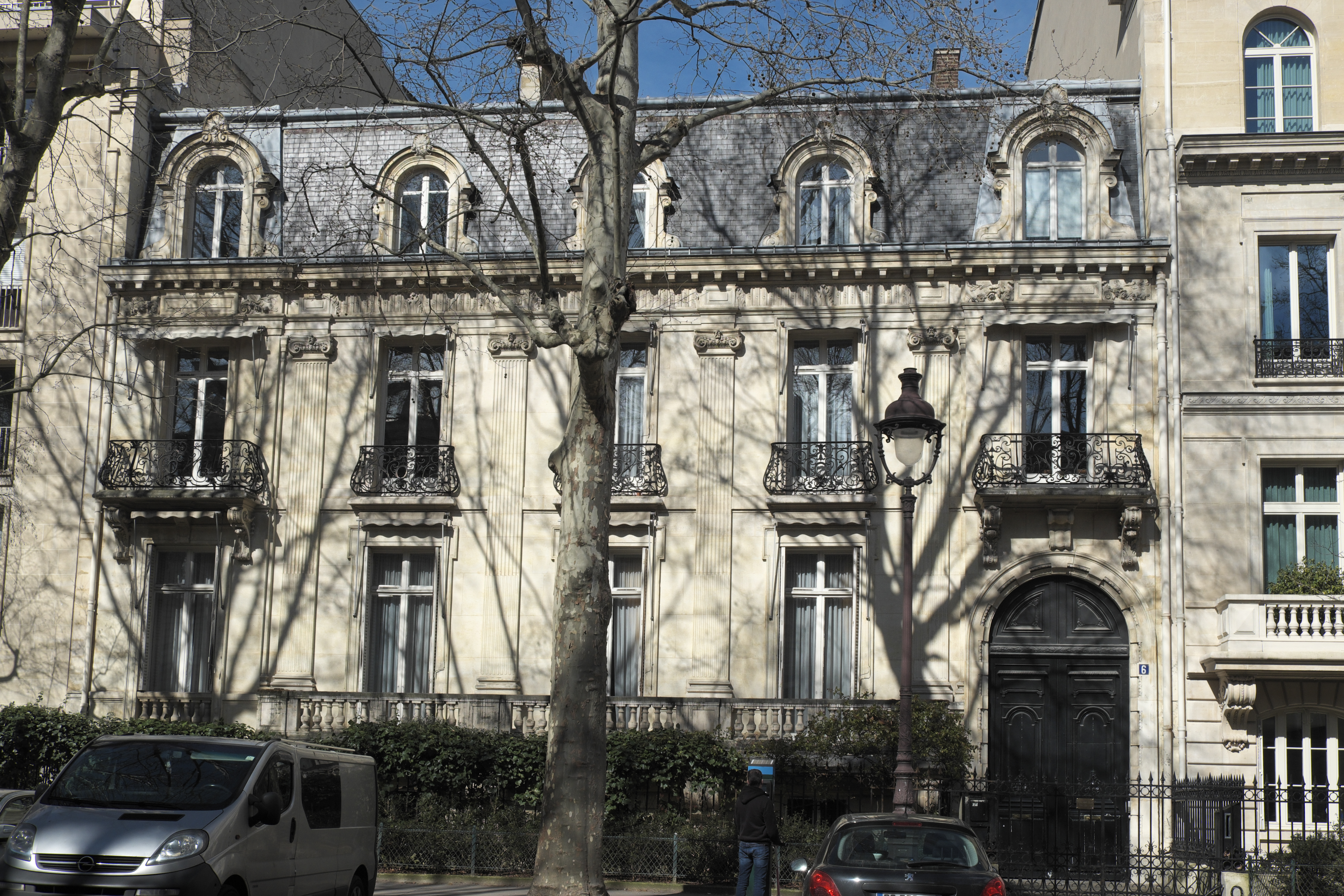
6 avenue Velasquez, the Paris office of Banque Belgolaise from 1997 to 2006

== See also ==
- Banque d'Outremer
- Société financière française et coloniale
- List of banks in Belgium
