= Katangese franc =

Currency of the State of Katanga

franc katangais (French)
- 1960 50 francs

Units of account
- Subunit
- 1/100: centime

Denominations
- Banknotes: 10, 20, 50, 100, 500 and 1,000 francs
- Coins: 1, 5 francs

Demographics
- Replaced: Belgian Congo franc
- Replaced by: Congolese franc
- User(s): Katanga

Issuance
- Central bank: Banque Nationale du Katanga
- This infobox shows the latest status before this currency was rendered obsolete.

The Katangese franc (French: franc katangais), was the currency of the unrecognized State of Katanga between 1960 and 1963 during its brief period of independence from the Republic of the Congo. It replaced the Congolese franc at par and was consequently initially equal to the Belgian franc. This established an exchange rate of 50 francs = 1 U.S. dollar. Just before Katanga was re-annexed by Congo, the exchange rate had fallen to 195 francs = 1 U.S. dollar. The currency was replaced at par by the Congolese franc.

== Coins ==
Bronze coins were issued in 1961 in denominations of 1 and 5 francs. A non-circulating gold 5 francs coin was also issued for collectors. Only one set containing 1 francs and 5 francs were ever made, and they remain readily available to collectors at nominal cost. Their design shows a copper cross, which was locally used for money in precolonial times.

Coins of the Katangese franc
Denomination	Issue	Metal	Diameter (mm)	Weight (g)	Obverse	Reverse
1 Franc	1961	Cu+Zn	22.30	4.70	Bananas - KATANGA	Katanga Cross - 1 FR - BANQUE NATIONALE - year of issue
5 Francs	1961	Cu+Zn	26.30	6.40	Bananas - KATANGA	Katanga Cross - 5 FR - BANQUE NATIONALE - year of issue

== Banknotes ==
In 1961, a provisional issue of notes was produced by the government. These were overprinted on notes of the Ruanda-Urundi franc in denominations of 5, 10, 20, and 50 francs. On 9 January 1961, regular notes dated 31.10.60 were issued by the Banque Nationale du Katanga in denominations of 10, 20, 50, 100, 500 and 1000 francs. A second series of notes was also issued dated 1962 and 1963 in denominations of 100, 500, and 1000 francs.

Banknotes of the Katangese franc (1960 Moise Tshombé issue)
Image	Value	Obverse	Reverse
	10 francs	Moïse Tshombe	National Assembly ("Bâtiment du 30 Juin"), Élisabethville (Lubumbashi)
	20 francs	Moïse Tshombe	National Assembly ("Bâtiment du 30 Juin"), Élisabethville (Lubumbashi)
	50 francs	Moïse Tshombe	National Assembly ("Bâtiment du 30 Juin"), Élisabethville (Lubumbashi)
	100 francs	Moïse Tshombe	National Assembly ("Bâtiment du 30 Juin"), Élisabethville (Lubumbashi)
	500 francs	Moïse Tshombe	National Assembly ("Bâtiment du 30 Juin"), Élisabethville (Lubumbashi)
	1000 francs	Moïse Tshombe	National Assembly ("Bâtiment du 30 Juin"), Élisabethville (Lubumbashi)

Banknotes of the Katangese franc (1962 "Franc Katangai" issue)
Image	Value	Obverse	Reverse	Watermark
	100 francs	Corn harvest	Wheel of spears and masks	Elephant
	500 francs	Man at a fireplace	Wheel of spears and masks	Elephant
	1000 francs	Cotton harvest	Wheel of spears and masks	Elephant

Preceded by: Congolese franc Reason: independence Ratio: at par	Currency of Katanga; 1960 – 1963	Succeeded by: Congolese franc Reason: reunification Ratio: at par
