= Union Zaïroise de Banques =

Former Congolese bank

The Union Zaïroise de Banques (UZB), known before 1971 as the Banque Belge d'Afrique (Dutch: Belgische Bank voor Afrika, lit. 'Belgian Bank of Africa') and after 2005 as the Union des Banques Congolaises, was a bank based in Kinshasa (before 1966, Léopoldville). It was established in 1929 by Belgium's Banque de Bruxelles as its main African banking affiliate, and remained majority-owned by European banks until nationalization in 1995. Its activities were liquidated in the early 2010s.

== Banque Belge d'Afrique ==
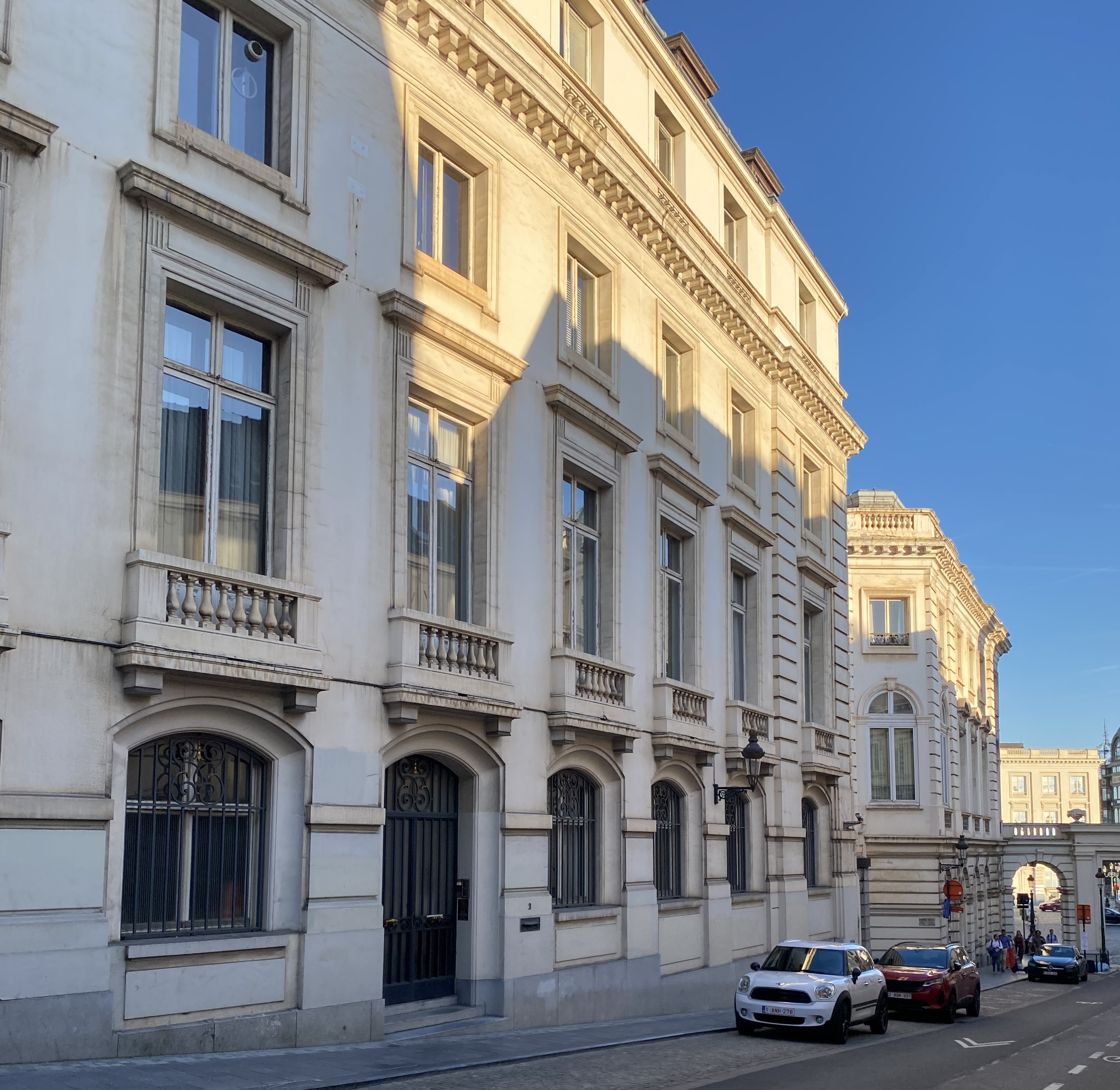
Former headquarters of the Banque Belge d'Afrique in Brussels, rue de Namur 3

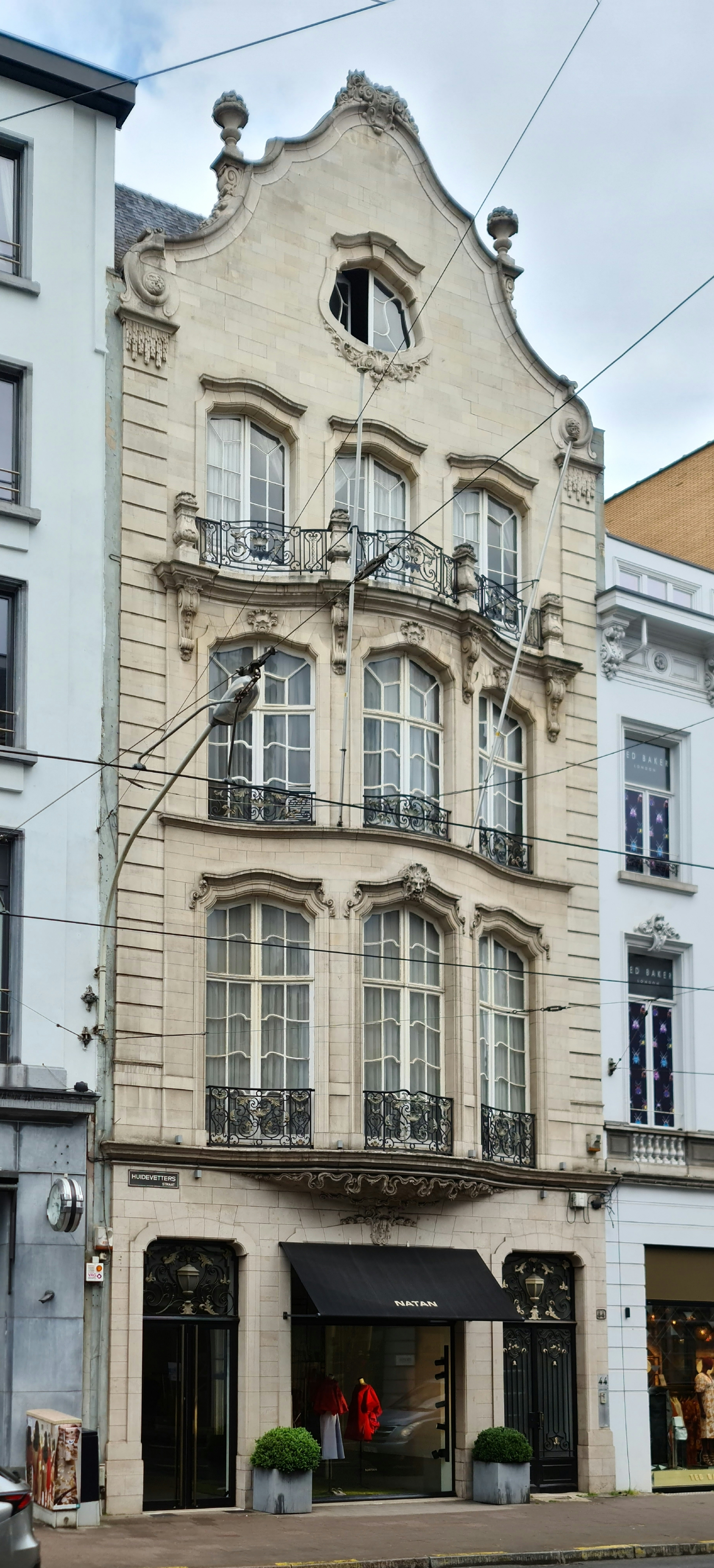
Rue des Tanneurs / Huidevettersstraat 44, former branch in Antwerp

In 1920, the Banque de Bruxelles established the Crédit General du Congo (also known as Crégéco), legally registered in Léopoldville with administrative headquarters (French: siège administratif) at Rue Royale 66 in Brussels. In 1923, the Banque de Bruxelles opened branches in Léopoldville and Elisabethville, then in Matadi and Stanleyville, which it subsequently transferred to Crégéco.

In 1929, Banque de Bruxelles transferred Crégéco's banking operations in the Belgian Congo to a newly created affiliate, the Banque Belge d'Afrique (BBA), while retaining Crégéco as a listed investment company. The BBA operated from the back of the Banque de Bruxelles building, at rue de Namur 3. It expanded its network of Congolese branches, including in Aketi, Albertville (now Kalemie), Coquilhatville (now Mbandaka), Costermansville (now Bukavu), Jadotville (now Likasi), Kolwezi, and Luluabourg (now Kananga). The BBA also had branches in Usumbura (now Bujumbura) in then Ruanda-Urundi, and in Bangui, Brazzaville and Pointe-Noire in French Equatorial Africa.

== Union Zaïroise de Banques ==
In 1971, with the country's renaming to Zaire, the Banque Belge d'Afrique was rebranded as Union Zaïroise de Banques. By then, its main shareholders were the Banque de Bruxelles (25 percent), Standard Bank (25 percent), Banque Internationale à Luxembourg, and the government of Zaire (18.8 percent).

By the late 1980s, the bank was still among the top three in Zaire, next to the Banque Commerciale Zaïroise and the Société Congolaise de Banque (by then branded "Banque du Peuple"). In 1989, it was still majority-owned by European commercial banks, as its shareholders were the Societe Financiere pour les Pays d'Outre-mer (SFOM) at 48 percent, the Government of Zaire at 28 percent, and Banque Bruxelles Lambert at 25 percent. The SFOM, a Swiss-based holding company, was jointly owned by Banque Nationale de Paris (48 percent), Dresdner Bank (26 percent), and Banque Bruxelles Lambert (26 percent).

By 1991, Union Zairoise de Banques had 16 offices in Zaire and was the second biggest bank in the country behind the Banque Commerciale Zairoise. Banque Bruxelles Lambert held 41.5% of its capital, directly and indirectly through SFOM. The Zaire Government held 15% of the capital, a group of private investors another 15%, and the rest was distributed among small investors. In 1995, shortly before the start of the First Congo War, the Zaire government nationalized UZB and dismissed its entire staff. The government also nationalized all the commercial banks at the same time.

== Union des Banques Congolaises ==
By 2005, the UZB was in severe financial distress. It was soon acquired by Banque Congolaise, an entity controlled since 1997 by businessman Alfred Roger Yaghi, alleged to have links with the Lebanese Hezbollah, upon which the bank's name was changed to Union des Banques Congolaises.

In late 2010, Banque Congolaise in turn failed and was placed under administration of the Central Bank of the Congo.

== See also ==
- Banque du Congo Belge
- Société Congolaise de Banque
