= Société Congolaise de Banque =

Former Congolese bank

The Société Congolaise de Banque (also known as Socobanque), known from 1970 successively as Banque du Peuple (lit. 'Bank of the People'), Banque Zaïroise du Commerce Extérieur (lit. 'Zaire Bank for Foreign Trade'), and eventually Banque Congolaise du Commerce Extérieur (lit. 'Congolese Bank for Foreign Trade'), was a bank based in Léopoldville, then Kinshasa, Congo, from 1947 to 2002.

== Overview ==
The Socobanque was established in 1947 by the Brussels-based Banque de Reports et de Dépôts (BRD) as its affiliate in the Belgian Congo. It came under control of the Banque Lambert as the latter took over the BRD in 1953.

In 1961, Banque Lambert fostered the creation of the Geneva-based Société financière pour les pays d'outre-mer (SFOM) with the aim of pooling its shareholders' investments in Africa; together with Banque Lambert, SFOM's founders included France's Banque Nationale pour le Commerce et l'Industrie and its African subsidiary BNCI-Afrique, California-based Bank of America, and Milan-based Banca d'America e d'Italia, which in 1964 were joined by Germany's Commerzbank. As a consequence, SFOM became the controlling shareholder of the Socobanque.

In 1970, following alleged tax irregularities, Socobanque was seized by the Congolese government, subsequently renamed "Banque du Peuple", and eventually nationalized in 1978. By 1987, it was still among the top three banks in Zaire.

The Socobanque / Banque du Peuple was later renamed Banque Zaïroise du Commerce Extérieur (BZCE), which after the country's renaming in 1997 was renamed Banque Congolaise du Commerce Extérieur (BCCE). The BCCE was eventually liquidated in 2002.

== See also ==
- Banque du Congo Belge
- Banque Belge d'Afrique
