= Degroof Petercam =

Belgian private bank

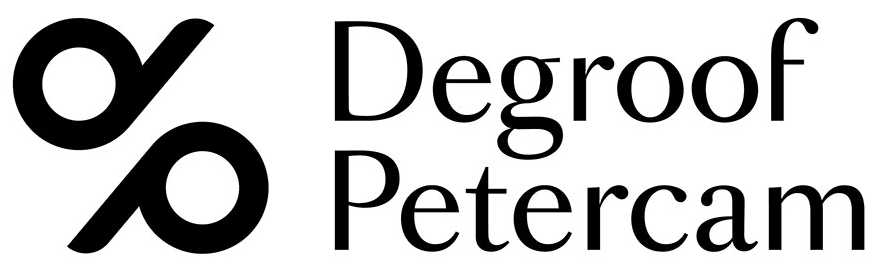

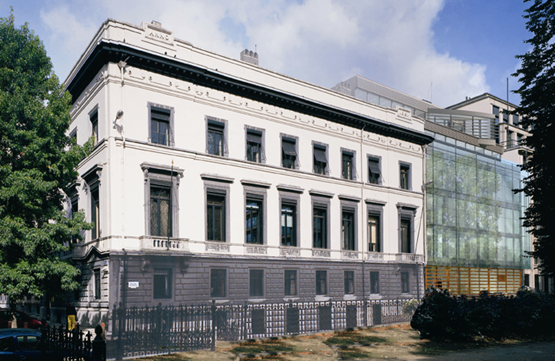
- Buildings at Rue Guimard 18 (left) and Rue de l'Industrie 44 (right, reconstructed) in Brussels, the bank's head office since 1888
- Company type: Subsidiary
- Industry: Financial services
- Predecessor: Banque Philippson
- Founded: 1871; 155 years ago
- Founder: Franz Philippson
- Headquarters: Brussels, Belgium
- Products: Private banking
- Owner: Crédit Agricole
- Parent: Banque Indosuez
- Website: www.degroofpetercam.com

Degroof Petercam is a Belgium private bank that was founded in 1871 and based in Brussels. Since 2024 it has been a subsidiary of Indosuez Wealth Management (a subsidiary of Paris-based Crédit Agricole.

The bank was founded as Banque Philippson in 1871 by Franz Philippson. It took the name Degroof in 1961 following a change in controlling ownership. In 2015, it merged with Belgian brokerage Petercam to form Degroof Petercam. In August 2023, Indosuez Wealth Management (a subsidiary of Paris-based Crédit Agricole) announced its acquisition of an 80-percent stake in Degroof Petercam, which it completed in 2024.

== History ==
=== Banque Philippson ===
Franz Philippson (1851–1929) was the son of prominent German rabbi Ludwig Philippson and his second wife Mathilde Hirsch. In 1866, he moved to Brussels and started working for Venetian Jewish banker Giacomo (Jacques) Errera, who had settled in the city a decade earlier. In 1871, the same year as Errera founded the Banque de Bruxelles, he entrusted Philippson with the initial capital for a bank in the latter's own name. In 1877, Errera's mental health problems resulted in Philippson's bank becoming fully autonomous. In 1888, Philippson secured a prominent position among the Brussels banking community by leading the restructuring of the CIty of Brussels' debt.

In 1909, Philippson became one of the main founding shareholders of the Banque du Congo Belge. Franz's sons Maurice (1877–1938) and Jules Philippson (1881–1961) led the bank in the interwar period. During World War II, the Philippson family had to flee the country to escape antisemitic persecution, then came back following the liberation of Belgium in 1945. By 1955, the bank was involved in 8 percent of all transactions on the Belgian stock market.

=== Degroof ===
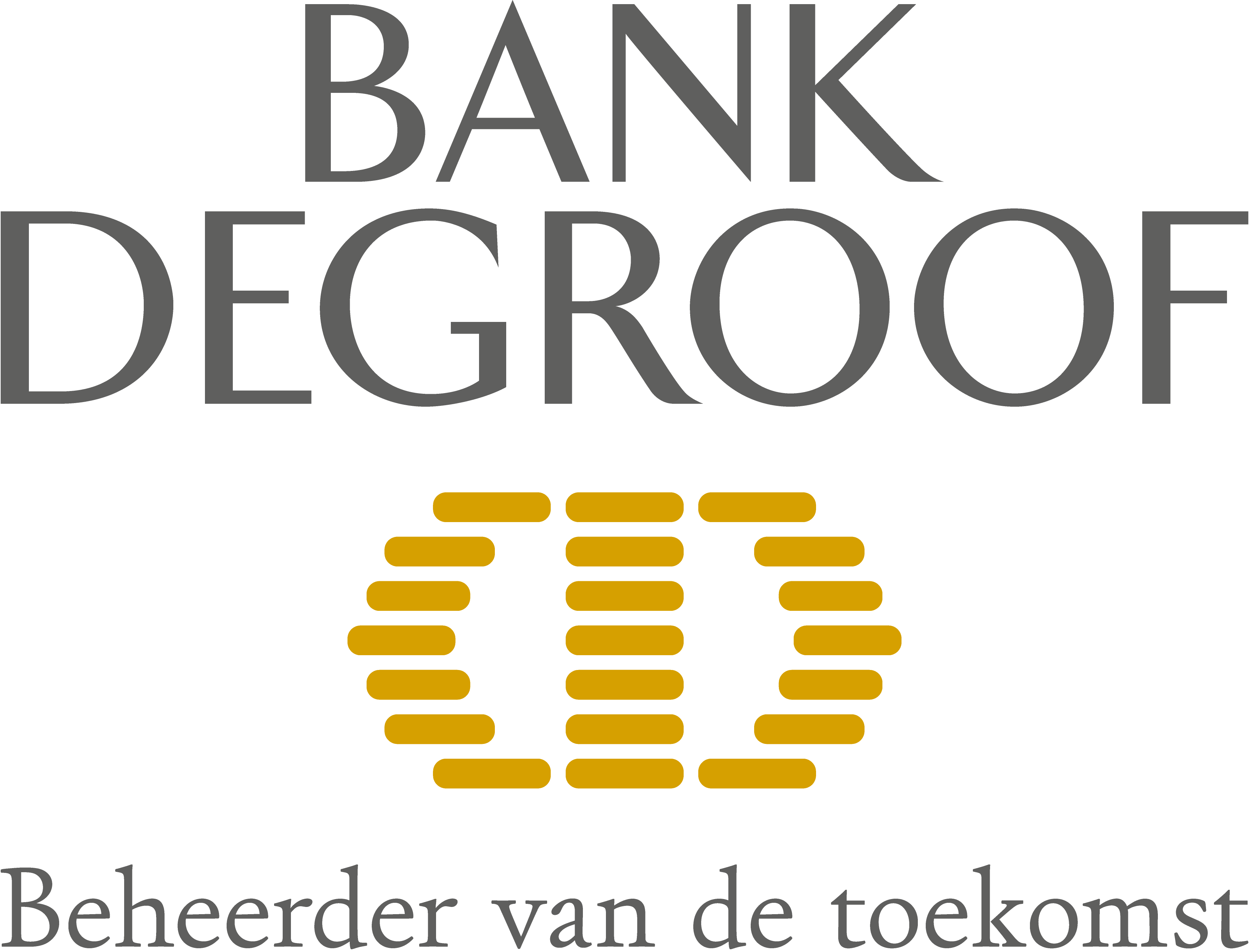
Bank Degroof logo from 2013

Jean Degroof had started working at the Banque Philippson in early 1912, aged 15, and rose through the ranks to become a partner. During World War II, together with fellow partner Richard Weitzel, he ran the bank during Jules Philippson's exile. In mid-1953, Degroof bought out Paul Philippson's shares and thus became a principal shareholder together with Jules Philippson, upon which the bank changed its name to Jules Phippson, Jean Degroof & Cie. An investment entity fully owned by Jean Degroof, the Mutuelle de participation et de gestion mobilières (Mupagemo), was established in 1955 to hold these shares. Following Jules Philippson's death in 1961, the bank abbreviated its name to Jean Degroof & Cie, while Mupagemo acquired the shares he had held in the bank.

By 1968, the bank's shareholders (French: commanditaires) were Jean Degroof (19,10 percent), Philippson family heir Benedict Goldschmidt (15,37 percent), Mupagemo (58,73 percent), and other members of the Philippson family (6,8 percent). Mupagemo then gradually bought out other shareholders and its equity stake grew to 75 percent in 1970, 84 percent in 1973, and 100 percent in 1988. In 1998, Marcel Degroof, by then the controlling shareholder of Mupagemo, sold shares to the bank's management and to external investors via the holding Compagnie du Bois Sauvage. In 2011, the Antwerp-based Cigrang family became shareholders of Banque Degroof via their CLdN holding company. By 2022, Alain Philipsson, a great-grandson of Franz Philippson, had again become the largest single shareholder in the bank.

=== Petercam ===
Petercam traces its origins to the stockbroking businesses of Léon Libert and Émile Van Campenhout, who started operations in 1919 and 1927 respectively, the former being joined from 1934 by his son-in-law Lucien Peterbroeck. Their respective inheritors, Jean Peterbroeck and Etienne and Emmanuel Van Campenhout, founded the brokerage Peterbroeck and Campenhout & Co in 1968, abbreviated as Petercam.

=== Degroof Petercam ===
The 2015 merger of Degroof and Petercam created a diversified financial services group centered on its asset management business but also offering services of institutional management, investment banking and the administrative management of investment funds. By 2023, its assets under management reached a total €71 billion. Alain Philippson became chairman of the merged entity, and was succeeded in 2018 by Ludwig Criel. and in 2021 by Gilles Samyn. In 2025, Jef Van In became chairman of the board of directors.

In August 2023, Crédit Agricole announced its intent to purchase an 80 percent stake in Degroof Petercam via its subsidiary Indosuez Wealth Management. The remaining 20 percent would remain held by the Cigrang family. By early June 2024, Crédit Agricole held 65 percent of the shares and prepared to launch an offer on an additional 15 percent.

== See also ==
- Banque Nagelmackers
- List of banks in Belgium
