= CRDB Bank =

Commercial bank in Tanzania

Coordinates: 06°48′53.5″S 39°17′15.5″E

CRDB Bank Plc
- Type: Public
- Traded as: DSE: CRDB
- Industry: Financial services
- Founded: 1996; 30 years ago
- Headquarters: Ally Hassan Mwinyi Road, Dar es Salaam, Tanzania
- Key people: Ally Hussein Laay; Chairman; Abdulmajid Mussa Nsekela; Managing Director
- Products: Savings products, Loans, Trade Finance, Investments, Treasury products, Credit Cards, Mortgages, Microfinance products, Agency Banking services, Premier Banking services, E-banking products, Insurance,
- Revenue: ▲Aftertax:TZS424 billion (approx. US$:164.86 million) (2023)
- Total assets: TZS13 trillion (approx. US$:5.055 billion) (2024)
- Number of employees: 3,729 (2022)
- Website: Bank website

CRDB Bank Plc is a commercial bank in Tanzania. It is licensed by the Bank of Tanzania, the central bank and national banking regulator. As of September 2022, CRDB Bank was the largest commercial bank in Tanzania.

== Location ==
The headquarters are located at Palm Beach, Upanga East, Ally Hassan Mwinyi Road in Dar es Salaam, the financial capital and largest city in Tanzania. The geographical coordinates of the bank's headquarters at Latitude:-6.799562, Longitude:39.28344.

== Overview ==
As of 31 December 2023, the bank's total assets were valued at TSh:13 trillion (approx. US$:5.055 billion). Customer deposits were valued at TSh:8.9 trillion (approx. US$:5.46 billion). The bank's loan book totaled TSh:8.5 trillion (approx. US$:5.46 billion). In the 12 months ended December 2023, the bank's after-tax profit was TSh:424 billion (approx. US$:164.86 million).

== Credit rating ==
In August 2016, Moody's Investors Services gave CRDB Bank a "B1 stable outlook" rating. Moody's said it based this rating on the bank's "impressive and consistent performances in local currency deposit ratings, foreign currency deposit ratings and baseline credit assessment".

== History ==
The bank was founded in July 1984, as Cooperative Rural Development Bank (CRDB) of Tanzania. Following the privatization of state-owned firms by the Tanzanian government, the bank was privatized in 1996 and became CRDB (1996) Limited. In 1996, the Danish International Development Agency (DANIDA) acquired a 30 percent ownership stake in the bank. The shares of stock of the bank were listed on the Dar es Salaam Stock Exchange on 17 June 2009.

== Ownership ==
Since 2009, the shares of stock of CRDB Bank Plc are listed on the Dar es Salaam Stock Exchange, where they trade under the symbol: CRDB. As of 30 June 2026, the shares of company stock were owned by parastatal companies, local and foreign institutions together with private individuals.

CRDB Bank Plc Shareholding Structure as at 30 June 2026
S/N	Shareholder	Shares	% Ownership
1.	Danida Investment Fund	548,067,648	21.0
2.	PSSF Pension Fund	346,761,028	13.3
3.	National Social Security Fund (Uganda)	206,246,402	7.9
4.	National Social Security Fund	43,575,766	1.7
5.	Zanzibar Social Security Fund	41,373,558	1.6
6.	Hans Mgaya Macha	40,466,725	1.5
7.	Tanvinder Singh Virdi	32,719,844	1.3
8.	Umoja Unit Trust Scheme	32,430,701	1.2
9.	National Health Insurance Fund (NHIF)	32,040,040	1.2
10.	Deogratius Emily Marandu	31,321,730	1.2
11.	CMG Investment Limited	30,933,283	1.2
12.	Banque Pictet and CIE SA A/C Patrick Shegg	29,934,870	1.1
13.	Godfrey Carlvin Magila	26,500,000	1.0
14.	More than 101,327 shareholders	1,169,466,989	45.0
	Grand Total	2,611,838,584	100.0

== CRDB Bank Group ==
The CRDB Bank Group comprises CRDB Bank Plc and four subsidiaries namely (a) CRDB Microfinance Services Limited (b) CRDB Insurance Company (c) CRDB Bank Burundi and (d) CRDB Bank DR Congo.

In 2021 the bank established "CRDB Al Barakah Banking", a unit that offers Shariah-compliant services. In 2024, that unit started offering "Takaful Insurance" in the sectors of automobile, home, business, fire, transportation and machinery. As of February 2024, the Sharia unit had generated business in excess of TSh125 billion (US$49 million).

In May 2024, the group indicated its intentions to establish subsidiaries in Zambia, Comoros, Uganda, Malawi and Rwanda.

== Governance ==
As of September 2023, Ally Hussein Laay served as the chairman of the thirteen-person board of directors and Abdulmajid Mussa Nsekela was the managing director and chief executive officer.

== See also ==
1. List of banks in Tanzania
2. Microfinance in Tanzania
