= Bank of the Republic of Burundi =

Central Bank of Burundi

Bank of the Republic of Burundi Banque de la République du Burundi
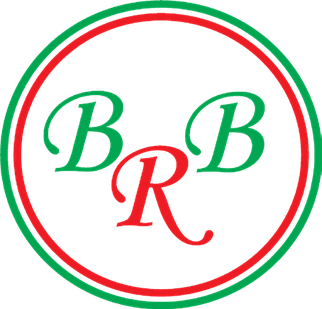

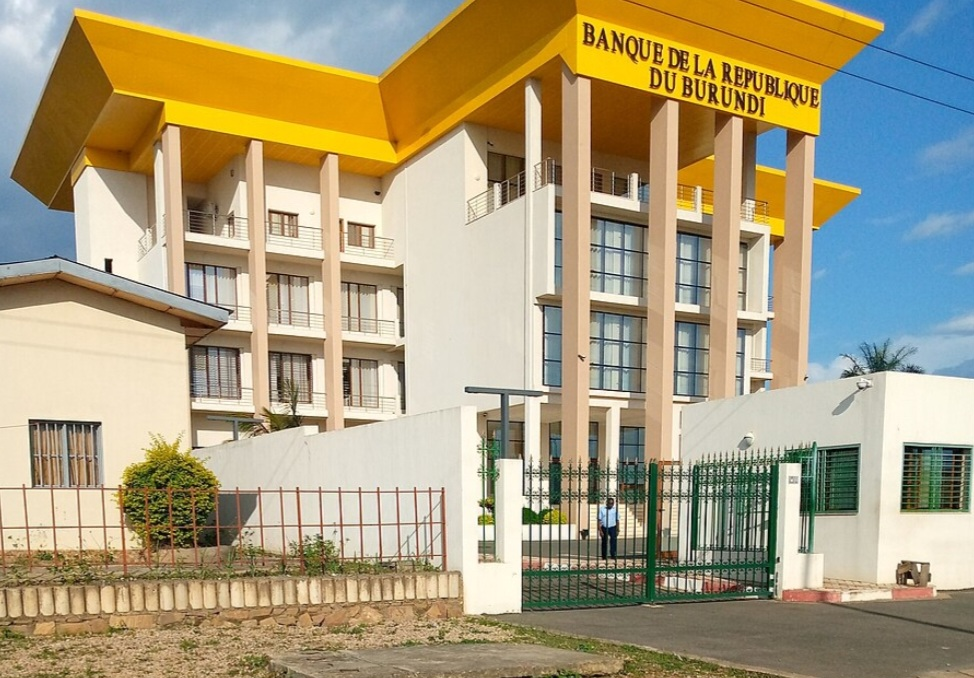
- BRB offices in Rumonge
- Central bank of: Burundi
- Headquarters: 1, Avenue du Gouvernement; BP 705; Bujumbura
- Established: 19 May 1964; 62 years ago (under the name Banque du Royaume du Burundi); 1966; 60 years ago (renamed to current name)
- Ownership: 100% state ownership
- Governor: Édouard Normand Bigendako
- Currency: Burundian franc BIF (ISO 4217)
- Reserves: 80 million USD
- Preceded by: Banque d'Émission du Rwanda et du Burundi
- Website: brb.bi

The Bank of the Republic of Burundi (Kirundi: Ibanki ya Republika y'uBurundi, French: Banque de la République du Burundi; BRB) is the central bank of Burundi. The bank was established in 1964 as the Banque du Royaume du Burundi and renamed to its current name in 1966 after the fall of the monarchy and the introduction of the Republic.

Its headquarters are in Bujumbura and it holuhhds offices in Gitega and Rumonge.

The Bank is active in promoting financial inclusion policy and is a member of the Alliance for Financial Inclusion. It is also one of the original 17 regulatory institutions to make specific national commitments to financial inclusion under the Maya Declaration during the 2011 Global Policy Forum held in Mexico.

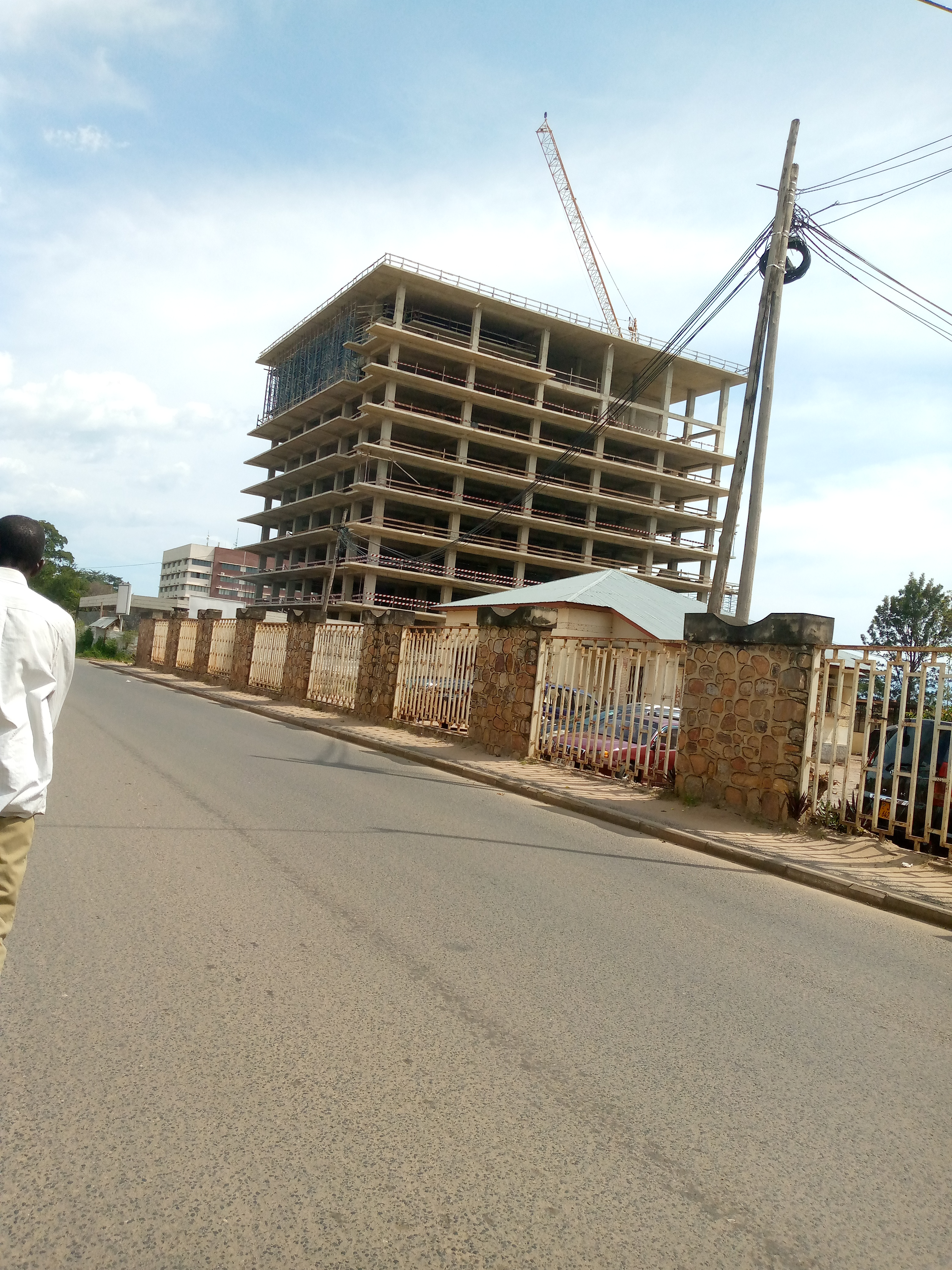
A view of the new headquarters of the BRB under construction in Bujumbura, around 2022

In 2019, the BRB started the construction of its new headquarters in Bujumbura, not too far from its current offices. However due to some technical issues, the project has experienced some delays.

The Current governor is Édouard Normand Bigendako.

== History ==
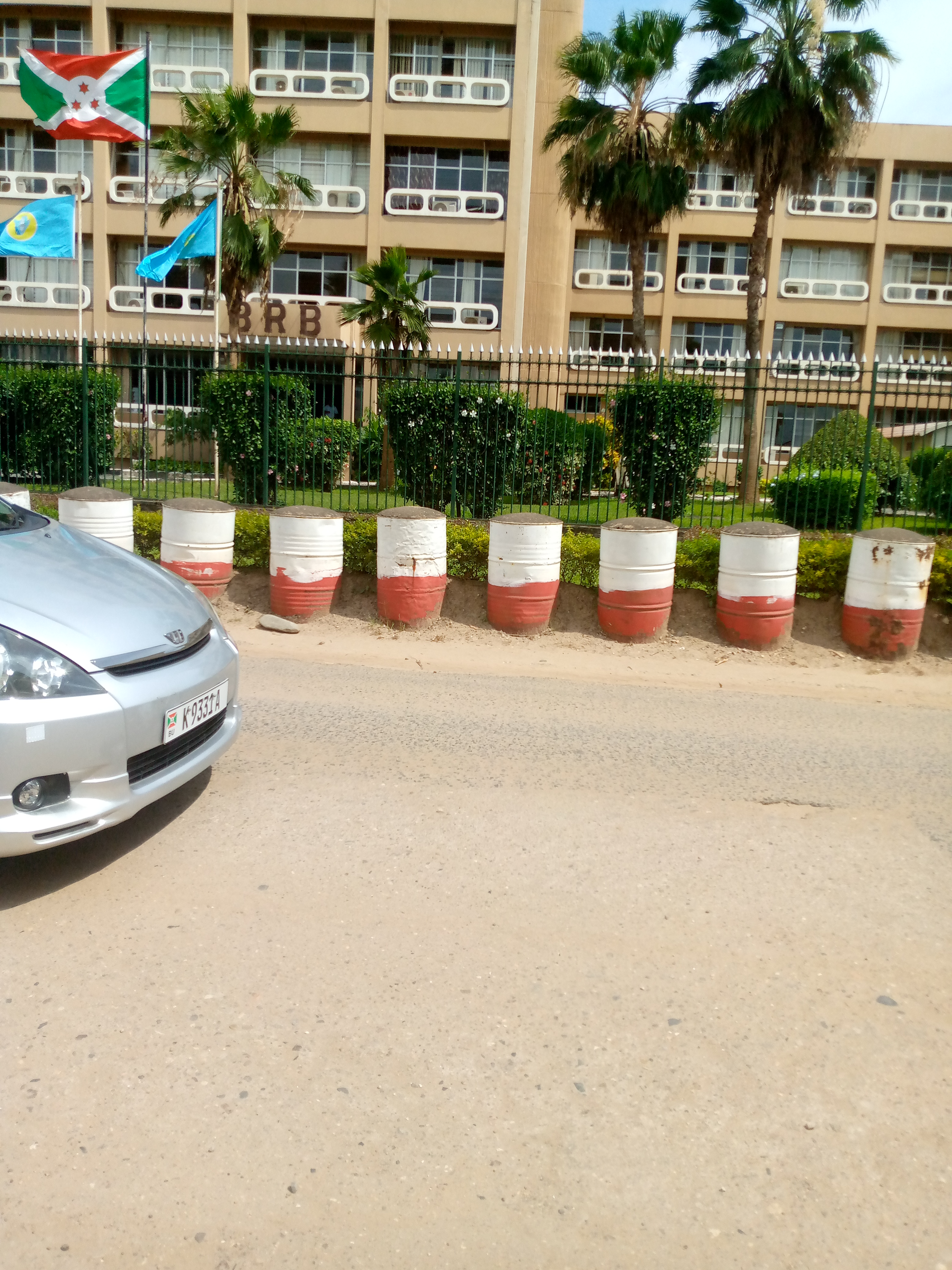
A view of the current headquarters of the BRB in Bujumbura

The central bank evolved step by step:

- Royal Decree of 27 July 1887 establishes the franc as the money of account for the Congo Free State, and Burundi is included as well.
- Heligoland Agreement of 1890 puts Rwanda and Burundi within the German sphere of influence in Africa; German East African rupie is the official currency; circulation of the French franc continues nonetheless.
- As a result of Belgium's actions, the Belgian Congo becomes a member of the Latin Monetary Union in 1908.
- Banque du Congo Belge established in 1909.
- Banque du Congo Belge issues its first banknotes in 1912.
- Rwanda and Burundi attached to the Congolese Franc Zone following Germany's defeat in World War I; 1927
- Colony of Belgian Congo and the Banque du Congo Belge create a new relationship; 1927–1952
  - World War II era: temporary involvement of the Bank of England; Congo franc is listed in London.
- Banque Centrale du Congo Belge et du Ruanda-Urundi (BCCBRU) 1952–1960
- Banque d'Émission du Rwanda et du Burundi (BERB) / (Issuing Bank of Rwanda and Burundi) – 1960–1964
- Banque du Royaume du Burundi (BRB) (Royal Bank of Burundi) and the Banque Nationale du Rwanda (BNR) open in 1964.
- Banque de la République du Burundi (BRB) opens in 1966.

== Governors ==
Name of the Governor	Term of office	
Name of the Governor	Took office	Left office
Bonaventure Kidwingira	1967	1977
Elisee Ntahonikora	1977	1980
Aloys Ntahonkiriye	1980	1986
Isaac Budabuda	1987	1992
Mathias Sinamenye	1992	1998
Grégoire Banyiyezako	1998	2003
Salvator Toyi	2003	2006
Gabriel Ntisezerana	2006	2007
Isaac Bizimana	2007	2007
Gaspard Sindayigaya	2007	2012
Jean Ciza	2012	2022
Dieudonné Murengerantwari	2022	2023
Édouard Normand Bigendako	2023	Present

== See also ==
- Minister of Finance, Budget and Economic Planning (Burundi)
- Burundian franc
- Central banks and currencies of Africa
- Economy of Burundi
- List of central banks
- List of companies of Burundi
- List of financial supervisory authorities by country
