= Markets in Bujumbura =

Markets in a city of Burundi

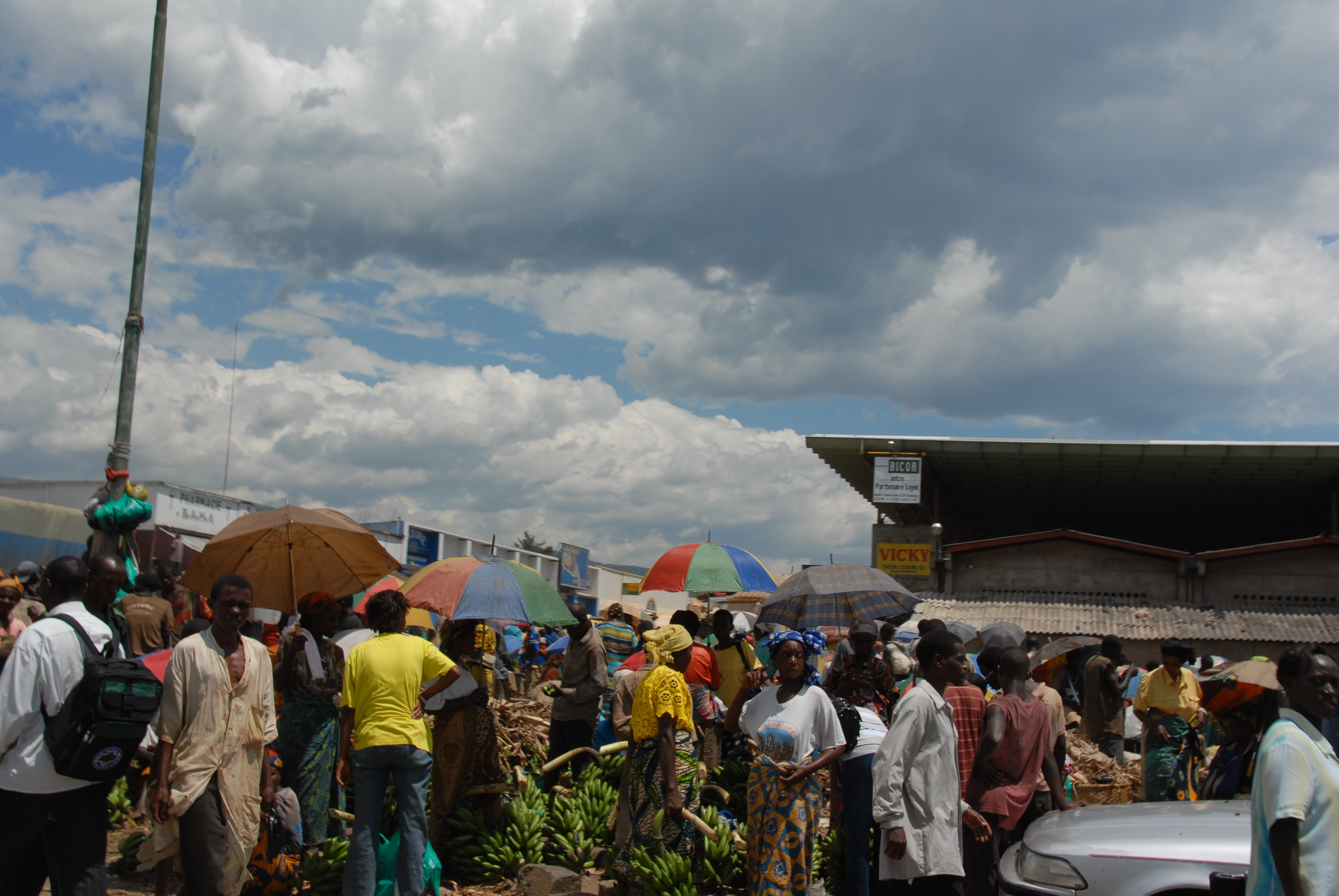
Market in Bujumbura 2007

The Markets in Bujumbura include the main public markets in the city of Bujumbura, Burundi, and various smaller public or private markets. Several thousand traders work in these markets, typically renting a very small stall and selling a limited range of goods. A well-meaning program to renovate seven of the markets, funded by the European Union, caused major costs and disruption to the traders in 2016–2018. Traders have also to deal with decisions by the city government to reallocate different types of business to different markets.

== Major markets ==
As of 2010 the six major markets in Bujumbura were Bujumbura Central Market; Kinama Market in the north, Buyenzi (Ruvumera) and Kinindo in the west; and Kanyosha and Musaga in the south. Bujumbura Central Market was supplied with cassava from Cibitoke, Bubanza, Kayanza, Ngozi, Gitega and Rumonge, and served as a wholesale market for cassava chips and flour. The other 5 markets were primarily retail markets but were also used by wholesalers and semi-wholesalers.

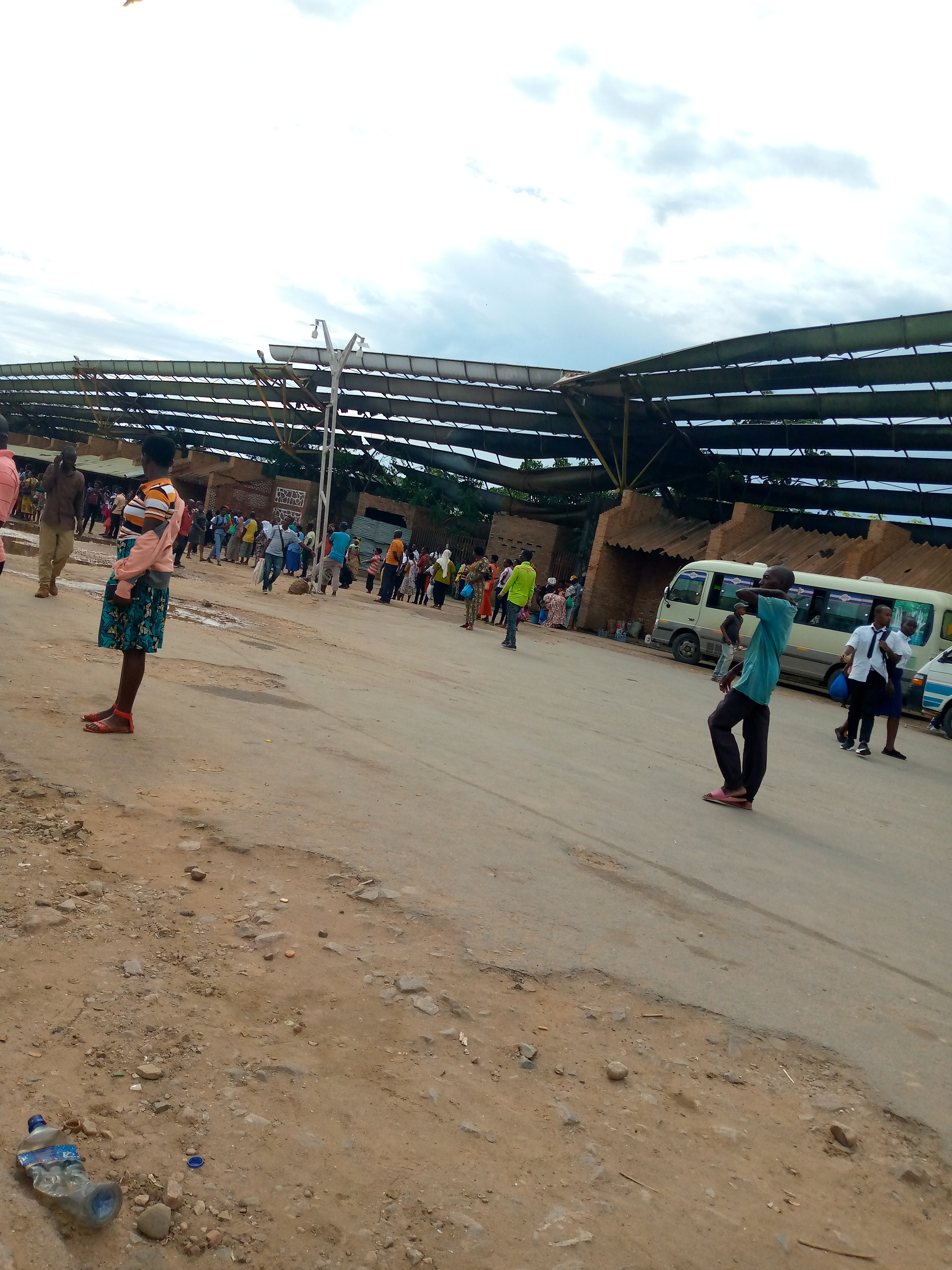
Remains of Bujumbura Central Market in 2022

When Bujumbura Central Market was destroyed by fire on 27 January 2013, the effect of the fire included food price increases, loss of value of the Burundian franc, losses to financial institutions, and a drop of tax revenues. Food products such as beans, rice and palm oil rose in price by up to 20%. The Burundian franc dropped by over 12% in two weeks due to increased demand for hard currency for imports to compensate for the goods that had been lost. Banks and microfinance institutions faced unpaid debt from traders. The state treasury and the province of Bujumbura Mairie lost tax revenues of about 50 to 60 million BIF per month.

== 2016–2018 renovations ==
In 2016 seven markets in Bujumbura were closed so they could be rehabilitated with funding from the European Union. Traders were given a deadline of 18 January 2016 to vacate their stalls. Temporary sites were allocated for the markets. Kinama Market was given the Kinama zone football field, Ngagara Market had the Methodist Church field, Musaga Market had the SOCARTI field, Kinindo Market had the Kibenga field and Ruziba Market was relocated to a place called Kigobe beside the Mugere River. The location for the Kanyosha Market was not named, and nowhere had been found for the Jabe Market. Some traders moved to the temporary markets, and others to different markets that remained open.

== Allocation of traders ==
The government of Bujumbura Mairie is active in allocating traders to the different markets. Thus in October 2010 the mayor of Bujumbura decided to make some of the municipal markets more specialized. Kinindo Market would be a center for storage, supply and wholesale of food products. Wholesalers selling dried fish, hardware and second-hand clothes would be transferred to the modern Buyenzi Market. Effective August 2021, the mayor decided to transfer all bus parking lots with connections to the south of the country to Kinindo Market.

On 27 June 2017 Freddy Mbonimpa, mayor of Bujumbura, said the parking lot for trans-city vehicles should move from the Gare du Nord to a parking lot opposite Cotebu Market. Taxis leaving for Gitega, Ngozi, Kayanza, Muramvya and Kirundo would also have to move to Cotebu Market. In September 2021, wholesalers of watermelons, tomatoes and amaranths were relocated from Cotebu Market to the Ngagara Market, as were the parking lots for vehicles transporting people and good from Bujumbura to Bubanza.

== List of markets in Bujumbura ==
Market	Commune / Zone	Booths	Coordinates
Bujumbura Central Market	Mukaza / Rohero	3,000 (closed)	3.38484°S 29.36575°E
Bujumbura City Market	Ntahangwa		3.36358°S 29.35742°E
COTEBU Market	Ntahangwa / Ngagara II	1500	3.36053°S 29.36662°E
Jabe Market	Mukaza / Bwiza	2,095	3.37113°S 29.37130°E
Kamenge Market	Ntahangwa	3,000	3.34660°S 29.38267°E
Kanyosha Market	Muha / Kanyosha		3.43155°S 29.36093°E
Kinama Market	Ntahangwa	2,085	3.33285°S 29.38200°E
Kinindo Market	Muha / Kinindo	1,200	3.40675°S 29.34951°E
Musaga Market	Muha / Musaga		3.41668°S 29.37145°E
Ngagara Market	Ntahangwa / Ngagara	900	3.35089°S 29.37285°E
Ruvumera Market	Mukaza / Buyenzi		3.37307°S 29.35496°E
Ruziba Market	Muha / Ruziba	600	3.47384°S 29.35021°E

== Sources ==
- "Bujumbura: Les commerçants contraints de déménager temporairement", Isanganiro, 12 January 2016
- Burundi – proposition visant l’octroi d’un don de 500 000 dollars eu au titre de l’aide d’urgence destine au programme d’actions visant a attenuer les effets de l’incendie du marche central de Bujumbura (PDF) (in French), African Development Bank Group, 2013
- Chemonics International Inc. (July 2010), Staple foods value chain analysis country report - Burundi (PDF), USAID, archived from the original (PDF) on February 20, 2017
- Habarugira, Bruce (17 September 2021), "Cotebu : les grossistes des fruits et légumes délocalisés", Burundi Eco (in French)
- Harerimana, Egide (3 August 2021), "Parking du marché de Kinindo : les usagers dénoncent des irrégularités", Iwacu (in French)
- "Marché de Kinindo/ La Sygeco plaide pour les vendeurs de friperie", Iwacu (in French), 19 August 2011
- Nikiza, Egide (3 July 2017), "Deux mesures pour plus de rentabilité du marché dit Cotebu", Iwacu (in French)
- Nininahazwe, Gaudiose (19 June 2018), "Les stands des nouveaux marchés de la Mairie de Bujumbura seront bientôt occupés", Radio Télévision Nationale du Burundi (in French)
