= Kinama Market =

Public market in Bujumbura, Burundi

- Market
- {{{other_names}}}
- Marché de Kinama
- Address: Commune of Ntahangwa, Bujumbura, Burundi
- Location within Burundi
- Coordinates: 3.332855°S 29.38200°E

The Kinama Market (French: Marché de Kinama) is a public market in Bujumbura, Burundi.

== Events and issues ==
As of 2010 Kinama Market in the north of the city was one of six major markets in Bujumbura. The others were Bujumbura Central Market; Buyenzi and Kinindo in the west; and Kanyosha and Musaga in the south. Kinama Market is closest to the cassava producing areas of Bujumbura Rural, Cibitoke and Bubanza. It has many mills for processing cassava, which is prominent among the produce for sale.

In May 2010 there were riots in the Kinama quarter of Bujumbara when people found "several ballot boxes filled with balloting papers, some of them not counted." Kinama market was looted, and was closed in the afternoon.

In 2016 seven markets in Bujumbura were closed so they could be rehabilitated with funding from the European Union. Traders were given a deadline of 18 January 2016 to vacate their stalls. Temporary sites were allocated for the markets. Kinama Market was given the Kinama zone football field, Ngagara Market had the Methodist Church field, Musaga Market had the SOCARTI field, Kinindo Market had the Kibenga field and Ruziba Market was relocated to a place called Kigobe beside the Mugere River. Some traders moved to the temporary markets, and others to different markets that remained open.

There were delays, in part due to shortage of materials, in part to breakdown of machinery, but also due to the traders having failed to pay their contributions to the cost of construction. In Kinama market 1,035 stallholders had paid by May 30 out of 2085 in total. The market was expected to open in July.

The market opened in August 2019, with more than 2,050 stands. In November 2019 many stands had not been completed, and some had not been started. Many of the completed stands were padlocked. Traders complained that the stands were too expensive, and speculators were driving up prices. During the rehabilitation of the market, many stalls were set up in the surrounding streets, and these were now attracting customers who would have shopped at the market.

In December 2019 Pierre Nkurunziza, President of Burundi, visited Bujumbura Mairie Province to officially inaugurate buildings as part of Burundi's 57th anniversary celebrations. This included the Kinama Market in the Commune of Ntahangwa, and the Tokyo Business Center, a large shopping center built by Vénérand Kazohera. The center contains banks, supermarkets and other businesses.

== See also ==
- List of markets in Bujumbura

== Sources ==
- Bigirimana, Raphaël (13 December 2019), "Le Chef de l'Etat poursuit l'inauguration des infrastructures d'intérêt public", Radio Télévision Nationale du Burundi (in French)
- "Bujumbura: Les commerçants contraints de déménager temporairement", Isanganiro, 12 January 2016
- Chemonics International Inc. (July 2010), Staple foods value chain analysis country report - Burundi (PDF), USAID, archived from the original (PDF) on February 20, 2017
- Haburiyakira, Felix (7 November 2019), "Marché de Kinama: Grogne des commerçants", Iwacu (in French)
- Nininahazwe, Gaudiose (19 June 2018), "Les stands des nouveaux marchés de la Mairie de Bujumbura seront bientôt occupés", Radio Télévision Nationale du Burundi (in French)
- "Post-vote clashes erupt", News24, 30 May 2010
- Uwimana, Diane (19 June 2018), "Burundi: Another appointment to open rehabilitated markets", Iwacu English News
