= Ngagara Market =

- Market
- {{{other_names}}}
- Marché de Ngagara
- Location within Burundi
- Coordinates: 3.35089°S 29.37285°E

The Ngagara Market (French: Marché de Ngagara) is a public market in Bujumbura, Burundi.

== Events and issues ==
In 2016 seven markets in Bujumbura were closed so they could be rehabilitated with funding from the European Union. Traders were given a deadline of 18 January 2016 to vacate their stalls. Temporary sites were allocated for the markets. Kinama Market was given the Kinama zone football field, Ngagara Market had the Methodist Church field, Musaga Market had the SOCARTI field, Kinindo Market had the Kibenga field and Ruziba Market was relocated to a place called Kigobe beside the Mugere River. The location for the Kanyosha Market was not named, and nowhere had been found for the Jabe Market. Some traders moved to the temporary markets, and others to different markets that remained open.

In February 2016 it was reported that no work had started at Ngagara Market, and garbage was piled up around it. Freddy Mbonimpa, mayor of Bujumbura, had said the work would take only four months for Ngagara. The renovated markets were officially reopened on 30 May 2018. They were to be occupied by July 2018, but the Ngagara Market opening was delayed due to problems in distributing the stands.

In September 2019 it was reported that the former Poroto football field, which had housed Ngagara Q3 market during the rehabilitation, had been left in a deplorable state and was now being used as a rubbish dump. After being rehabilitated the Ngagara market remained almost empty for some time. In March 2021 the market had many empty stalls, and few customers. The Bujumbura City Market and the Cotebu Market were near the Ngagara market in the Ngagara area, and the Kamenge Market and Kinama Market were not far away.

In September 2021 only 100 stalls were occupied out of more than 900. In September 2021, wholesalers of watermelons, tomatoes and amaranths were relocated from Cotebu Market to the Ngagara Market, as were the parking lots for vehicles transporting people and good from Bujumbura to Bubanza. The purpose was to make the Ngagara Market more profitable, since it was not very busy. There was some increased activity as a result. As of December 2021 most of the clean water taps were blocked, the toilets were not being cleaned and the electricity supply had failed.

== See also ==
- List of markets in Bujumbura

== Sources ==
- "Bujumbura: Les commerçants contraints de déménager temporairement", Isanganiro, 12 January 2016
- Bujumbura : Les marchés rénovés cultiveront la concurrence (in French), CDE Great Lakes, 29 May 2018
- Habarugira, Bruce (17 September 2021), "Cotebu : les grossistes des fruits et légumes délocalisés", Burundi Eco (in French)
- "Kinama, un marché qui pue", Isanganiro (in French), 17 September 2014
- Ndikumana, Jonathan (3 December 2021), "Marché de Ngagara : Des progrès toujours mitigés", Burundi Eco (in French)
- Nininahazwe, Gaudiose (19 June 2018), "Les stands des nouveaux marchés de la Mairie de Bujumbura seront bientôt occupés", Radio Télévision Nationale du Burundi (in French)
- Niyungeko, Dorine (29 March 2021), "Ngagara : un marché désert", Iwacu (in French)
- "Réhabilitation des marchés : timide commencement des travaux", IGIHE (in French), 13 February 2016
- Rigumye, Mariette (29 March 2021), "Fait du jour/Marché de Ngagara: sur plus de 900 stands, moins de 100 sont occupés", Iwacu (in French)
