= Musaga Market =

- Market
- {{{other_names}}}
- Marché de Musaga
- Location within Burundi
- Coordinates: 3.41668°S 29.37145°E

The Musaga Market (French: Marché de Musaga) is a public market in the Musaga zone of Muha Commune, Bujumbura, Burundi.

== Location ==
Musaga Market is in the Musaga zone of the Commune of Muha. As of 2010 Musaga Market in the south of the city was one of six major markets in Bujumbura. The others were Bujumbura Central Market; Kinama in the north, Buyenzi (Ruvumera) and Kinindo in the west; and Kanyosha in the south. Musaga Market was relatively new and well built.

== Events and issues ==
In 2016 seven markets in Bujumbura were closed so they could be rehabilitated with funding from the European Union. Traders were given a deadline of 18 January 2016 to vacate their stalls. Temporary sites were allocated for the markets. Kinama Market was given the Kinama zone football field, Ngagara Market had the Methodist Church field, Musaga Market had the SOCARTI field, Kinindo Market had the Kibenga field and Ruziba Market was relocated to a place called Kigobe beside the Mugere River. Some traders moved to the temporary markets, and others to different markets that remained open.

A report in January 2016 said the old Musaga Market had been closed, but rehabilitation had not started. The temporary replacement market in Musaga zone had mostly wooden stalls, with some built on the fences of houses on a road near the market. There was no water and no latrines, and men were relieving themselves on the fence of the Kinanira primary school.

The Musaga Market reopened after renovations on 27 June 2018. The market had been closed for over two years. It was the first of seven to reopen after renovations. Traders complained about the high prices demanded by the construction company for the stands. Some claimed that people with ties to that company had received stands at low prices and were reselling them at an exorbitant mark-up. In theory, state property cannot be sold or rented.

Traders also complained that the 1 by 1 metre (3 ft 3 in by 3 ft 3 in) stands were narrower than before, which had been necessary to make room for new infrastructure. The small spaces created problems for wholesale traders, who could not fit their goods into them. Improvements included a 5 metres (16 ft) shed with water, latrines, administrative offices and a garbage storage space. There was also fire protection equipment, a jail and an infirmary.

In July 2018 28 tailors at the market complained that there were no lights in their shed. They recognized that installing electricity would be expensive, but the market commissioner had promised to instal new transparent sheets to let light in. They were also complaints about the placement of stands, in which clothing stands were next to food stalls.

== See also ==
- List of markets in Bujumbura

== Sources ==
- "Bujumbura: Les commerçants contraints de déménager temporairement", Isanganiro, 12 January 2016
- Chemonics International Inc. (July 2010), Staple foods value chain analysis country report - Burundi (PDF), USAID, archived from the original (PDF) on February 20, 2017
- "Deux ans après sa fermeture pour réhabilitation, le marché de Musaga est de nouveau fonctionnel", Radio Publique Africaine (in French), 29 June 2018
- Irabaruta, Chanelle (29 June 2018), "Réouverture du marché de Musaga : des grognes fusent", Iwacu (in French)
- "Les commerçants du nouveau marché de Musaga crient à la spoliation de leurs stands", Radio Publique Africaine, 10 July 2018
- Ndayirata, Egide (18 July 2018), "Marché de Musaga : Des tailleurs sont dans le noir", Iwacu (in French)
- Nininahazwe, Gaudiose (19 June 2018), "Les stands des nouveaux marchés de la Mairie de Bujumbura seront bientôt occupés", Radio Télévision Nationale du Burundi (in French)
- "Nouveau marché de Musaga : Sans eau ni latrines", Isanganiro (in French), 19 January 2016
