= Burundian Office of Urban Planning, Housing and Construction =

Burundi Office of Urbanism, Housing and Construction
- Better planning for decent housing (in french: Mieux planifier pour un habitat décent)
- Trade name: OBUHA
- Native name: Office Burundais de l'Urbanisme, de l'Habitat et de la Construction
- Industry: Land acquisition and subdivision, public housing and urbanisation
- Founded: 24 May 2019; 7 years ago
- Headquarters: Gitega, Burundi
- OBUHA Headquarters (Burundi)
- Website: https://obuha.bi/

The Burundi Office of Urbanism, Housing and Construction (French: Office Burundais de l'Urbanisme, de l'Habitat et de la Construction), or OBUHA, is a government agency based in Gitega, Burundi that is responsible for managing the development of urban housing.

== Creation ==
OBUHA was created by presidential decree no 100/079 of 24 May 2019, which described its creation, missions, organization and functions. It is a legal entity with its own assets and financial autonomy, supervised by the Minister responsible for Urban Planning and Housing. OBUHA was formed by merging:

- Direction Générale de l'Urbanisme et de l'Habitat (Directorate General of Urbanism and Habitat: DGUH)
- Laboratoire National du Batiment et des Travaux Publics (National Laboratory of Buildings and Public Works: LNBTP)
- Direction Générale du Batiment (General Directorate of Construction: DGB)
- Régie des Services Techniques Municipaux (Municipal Technical Services Department: SETEMU)
- Encadrement des Constructions Sociales et Aménagement des Terrains (Supervision of Social Constructions and Land Development: ECOSAT)
- Société Immobilière Publique (Public Real Estate Company: SIP)

== Roles ==
OBUHA functions include:

- Acquire and subdivide building spaces, and promote production of serviced plots
- Identify sites for infrastructure, and facilitate connection of water, sewage, electricity, gas and Internet lines in the neighborhoods
- Develop and maintain access roads in the neighborhoods, and maintain urban and semi-urban roads.
- Promote production of social housing, high-rise housing and other urban housing in compliance with construction standards
- Construct and maintain buildings, and promote a long-term rental-purchase system, including rental to civil servants
- Analyze and validate the technical characteristics of construction materials
- Ensure protection of Lake Tanganyika and the waterways of the country

== History ==
In 2020 OBUHA banned commercial dredging of the Muha, Kanyosha, Ntahangwa, Mutimbuzi and other rivers of Bujumbura, since only OBUHA had the proper equipment for mechanical dredging, and manual dredging could not handle large rocks in the river bed. However, given lack of funding and the risk of floods, the agency soon allowed the cooperatives that did manual dredging to resume work. The cooperatives would pay OBUHA for the construction materials they retrieved, and were committed to building dikes and planting trees to protect the river banks.

In August 2023 OBUHA defined regulations that applied to many of the districts in the Mukaza, Muha and Ntahangwa communes of Bujumbura Mairie. A lot of less than 10 ares, or 1,000 square metres (11,000 sq ft), could not be subdivided. Buildings in lots of less than 10 ares must be at least three stories high, i.e. a ground floor and two stories. For lots of more than 10 ares, buildings must be at least five stories high.

== See also ==
- List of companies of Burundi
- Economy of Burundi

== Sources ==
- Decret No 100/079 du 24 Mai 2019 ... (PDF) (in French), Burundi
- Misago, Jeremie (25 August 2023), "Bujumbura : l'OBUHA suspend approbation de morcellement et de transfert des parcelles", Iwacu (in French)
- Niyongabo, Jean Marie Vianney (18 December 2020), "Rivières traversant la ville de Bujumbura : Reprise modérée des travaux de curage", Burundi Eco
