= Kanyosha Market =

- Market
- {{{other_names}}}
- Marché de Kanyosha
- Location within Burundi
- Coordinates: 3.43155°S 29.36093°E

The Kanyosha Market (French: Marché de Kanyosha) is a public market in the Kanyosha zone of Muha Commune, Bujumbura, Burundi.

== Location ==
As of 2010 Kanyosha in the south of the city was one of six major markets in Bujumbura. The others were Bujumbura Central Market; Kinama in the north, Buyenzi (Ruvumera) and Kinindo in the west; and Musaga in the south.

== Events and issues ==
In 2016 seven markets in Bujumbura were closed so they could be rehabilitated with funding from the European Union, including Kanyosha. Traders were given a deadline of 18 January 2016 to vacate their stalls. Temporary sites were allocated for the markets. The site for the Kanyosha Market was not named.

In June 2018 Kanyosha Market was incomplete and had been delayed due to problems in distributing the stands. In August 2020 Wwacu reported that although the red roofs surrounded by brick walls gave the impression from outside of a modern market, inside there were no proper kiosks. Three workers were welding shelves in the sheds, but 799 metal kiosks were yet to be built. The reason was that only 200 traders out of 799 had paid their fees to Alubuco, the kiosk construction company.

On 5 March 2021 Kanyosha market finally reopened. There were meant to be 800 metals kiosks, but welders were still working on incomplete stalls. A report in November 2022 said that the traders had to pay waste collection companies to collect garbage. The "Green Network" company was doing a good job of collecting waste. The market administration would also assist by unclogging gutters and setting up public garbage bins.

== See also ==
- List of markets in Bujumbura

== Sources ==
- "Bujumbura: Les commerçants contraints de déménager temporairement", Isanganiro, 12 January 2016
- Chemonics International Inc. (July 2010), Staple foods value chain analysis country report - Burundi (PDF), USAID, archived from the original (PDF) on February 20, 2017
- Gahama, Pacifique (7 March 2021), "Le marché de Kanyosha ouvre ses portes après 5 ans de réhabilitation", Iawacu (in French)
- Misago, Jeremie (12 August 2020), "Imbroglio autour de la réhabilitation du marché de Kanyosha", Iwacu (in French)
- Nininahazwe, Gaudiose (19 June 2018), "Les stands des nouveaux marchés de la Mairie de Bujumbura seront bientôt occupés", Radio Télévision Nationale du Burundi (in French)
- Ntahondi, Nathan (11 November 2022), "Les usagers du marché de Kanyosha saluent les activités de la société «Green Network»", Le Renouveau (in French)
