= Mugere =

Mugere may refer to:

- Mugere River, a river in Burundi
- Mugere, Burundi, location of the Livingstone–Stanley Monument, just south of the river near its mouth
- Mugere Hydroelectric Power Station in Burundi, on the river
