= Cotebu Market =

COTEBU Market Marché de COTEBU
- Market
- Address: Commune of Ntahangwa, Bujumbura, Burundi
- Location within Burundi
- Coordinates: 3.36053°S 29.36662°E

The COTEBU Market (French: Marché de COTEBU), or Ngagara II Market (Note: Formally called the Ngagara II Market, it should not be confused with the Ngagara Market), is a public market in the Ngagara zone of the Commune of Ntahangwa, Bujumbura, Burundi.

== Events and issues ==
Ngagara II Market, known as Cotebu Market for its proximity to the former COTEBU factory complex, was officially opened in February 2015 in the Ngagara zone of the Ntahangwa commune to temporarily accommodate traders from the Bujumbura Central Market, which was destroyed by fire on 27 January 2013. The market had 2,394 stands, excluding the fishmongers, plus 167 reserved for daily traders. The market was meant to be temporary, so did not have a parking lot or latrines.

A month later, in March 2015, it was reported that almost all the aisles in the Cotebu temporary market were empty, while others were being built, and there were very few customers. The low metal roofs resulted in very high temperatures inside the market. Fishmongers were in a better condition, since they had a well-appointed air conditioned room, but they did not have enough customers.

On 27 June 2017 Freddy Mbonimpa, mayor of Bujumbura, said the parking lot for trans-city vehicles should move from the Gare du Nord to the dump truck parking lot opposite Cotebu Market on OAU Avenue. The dump trucks would be moved down the Avenue de l'Agriculture towards the Kwa Siyoni Market. Taxis leaving for Gitega, Ngozi, Kayanza, Muramvya and Kirundo would also have to move to Cotebu Market.

On 29 June 2017 Pascal Barandagiye, Minister of the Interior, ordered that the annex of the former Bujumbura Central Market known as the "Grenier du marché" be closed, and the traders moved to the Cotebu Market. The next month, the municipal authorities started to destroy non-functional stands at the market. The space was converted to three sheds for wholesalers of fruit, vegetables and potatoes relocated from the "Grenier du Burundi", who had been displaying their wares in the hot sun along Avenue de l'OUA. They needed a shaded, well-ventilated space. Traders who had been displaced complained that they were not able to recover their goods or the materials of the destroyed stands.

Starting in September 2021, wholesalers of watermelons, tomatoes and amaranths were to be relocated from Cotebu Market to the Ngagara Market, as were the parking lots for vehicles transporting people and good from Bujumbura to Bubanza. The purpose was to make the Ngagara Market more profitable, since it was not very busy.

In May 2022 the market was still lacking trash cans. Traders carried their waste to the nearby garbage heaps. There was a single evil-smelling toilet block nearby run by a private operator who charged a fee for use. The stands were almost all occupied.

In January 2024 Iwacu reported that mounds of garbage near the fruit and vegetable stalls was decomposing and making nauseating smells. The market sweepers pile the waste up. Occasionally a machine sweeps up and takes some of the waste, but it only takes some of it, and may not return for two months. Both buyers and vendors are concerned about the health risks. In March 2024 it was reported that there were no public taps and no drinking water in the market. There were also no public latrines.

== See also ==
- List of markets in Bujumbura

== Sources ==
- Gahama, Parfait (8 August 2017), "Marché de Cotebu : les propriétaires des stands détruits voient rouge", Iwacu (in French)
- Habarugira, Bruce (17 September 2021), "Cotebu : les grossistes des fruits et légumes délocalisés", Burundi Eco (in French)
- Ndayishimiye, Alexandrine (1 March 2024), Marché dit Cotebu : L’eau potable y est introuvable (in French)
- Ndikumana, Jonathan (13 May 2022), "Les usagers du marché « COTEBU » face à l'insalubrité", Burundi Eco (in French)
- Nikiza, Egide (3 July 2017), "Deux mesures pour plus de rentabilité du marché dit Cotebu", Iwacu (in French)
- "Salubrité au marché dit Cotebu : des monticules d'immondices se forment", Iwacu (in French), 25 January 2024
- Shaka, Clarisse (21 March 2015), "Marché de Cotebu : le remède est pire que le mal", Iwacu (in French)
