= Muha River =

River in Burundi

- Location within Burundi
- Native name: Rivière Muha (French)

Location
- Country: Burundi

Physical characteristics
- Mouth
  - coordinates: 3.401171°S 29.341934°E

The Muha River (French: Rivière Muha) is a river in Burundi that flows through the south of Bujumbura. There are many problems with flooding and erosion, aggravated by extraction of sand and gravel from the river for use in construction.

== Course ==
The source of the Muha River is north of the Commune of Kanyosha in Bujumbura Rural Province at an altitude of 1,650 metres (5,410 ft). It flows east into Bujumbura Mairie Province and into the south of the city of Bujumbura through the Muha Commune to its mouth on Lake Tanganyika. The drainage basin covers 24.94 square kilometres (9.63 sq mi).

The course of the Muha is quite stable in its upper section. Around the 940 metres (3,080 ft) elevation its bed becomes deeply embedded, with vertical banks about 5 metres (16 ft) high. At the 914 metres (2,999 ft) elevation the Muha flows in a bed about 5 metres (16 ft) wide on each side with small meanders. The Gatoke ravine is on the right bank with a gabion at its entrance.

The right bank at Gatoke was covered with stones in 2000, while the left bank was planted with old eucalyptus trees, although at the Muha camp some trees had recently been felled. The Muha's main tributary, the Mpimba River, joins it at the 809 metres (2,654 ft) elevation. There is much silting in the dry season where the Mpimba River meets the Ruha River, and flooding in the rainy season. The river flows west to its mouth on Lake Tanganyika at an elevation of 673.91 metres (2,211.0 ft).

== Environment ==
The area around the Muha River is very densely populated, with 1,956 inhabitants per square kilometer as of 2016. Savannah climate prevails in the area. The average annual temperature in the area is 20 °C (68 °F). The warmest month is August, when the average temperature is 25 °C (77 °F), and the coldest is January, with 18 °C (64 °F). Average annual rainfall is 1,086 millimetres (42.8 in). The wettest month is December, with an average of 154 millimetres (6.1 in) of precipitation, and the driest is July, with 3 millimetres (0.12 in) of precipitation.

== Issues ==
The floods of the Muha and the Mpimba tributary constantly threaten the roads and bridges of the city. Above the RN7 bridge over the Muha, as of 2000, gravel had been extracted from the right bank, causing erosion and threatening the bridge. A dam below the bridge had been partially destroyed by erosion. Further down, the RN3 bridge over the river was protected by a gabion on the right bank upstream and on the left bank downstream. The central channel of the Avenue du Large bridge was completely clogged by sediment. The river bed was silted down to its mouth on Lake Tanganyika at an elevation of 673.91 metres (2,211.0 ft), with traces that the river had changed its course recently.

The riverside inhabitants earn money by extraction and sale of construction materials such as pebbles, gravel, sand and rubble from the river. However this aggravates erosion, pollutes the rivers and Lake Tanganyika, and causes the collapse of bridges. In January 2019 the RN3 bridge over the Muha River was at risk of collapsing. The gabions that supported the side of the bridge had already collapsed. Near the bridge several trees had been uprooted by a landslide when the Muha widened its bed. In July 2021 it was reported that the banks of the Muha River were collapsing at the RN3 Boulevard de la Liberté bridge.

== Maintenance ==
By 2018 landslides were common. Many trees had been planted along the river to stabilize the banks, and gabions had been installed to slow down the water between the Gatoke and Gasekebuye districts.

In 2020 Burundian Office of Urban Planning, Housing and Construction (OBUHA) banned commercial dredging of the Muha, Kanyosha, Ntahangwa, Mutimbuzi and other rivers of Bujumbura, since only OBUHA had the proper equipment for mechanical dredging, and manual dredging could not handle large rocks in the river bed. However, given lack of funding and the risk of floods, the agency soon allowed the cooperatives that did manual dredging to resume work. The cooperatives would pay OBUHA for the construction materials they retrieved, and were committed to building dikes and planting trees to protect the river banks.

Between August and October 2022 the Burundi Road Agency restored the banks of the Muha near the bridge of the Avenue du Large, which was threatened, as were nearby homes. In December 2022 the administrator of Muha commune noted that the commune had planted over sixty thousand trees on the banks of the Muha, Kanyosha, Kizingwe and Kamesa rivers.

== See also ==
- List of rivers of Burundi

== Sources ==
- "Bujumbura : Le Pont Muha risque de disparaitre", Isanganiro (in French), 24 January 2019
- Hakizimana, Claude (15 December 2022), "Commune Muha : Mise en œuvre des projets de développement communautaire", Le Renouveau (in French)
- Hydroplan (May 2000), Etude d'une méthodologie d'évaluation de l'impact du Project des Travaux Publics et de Création d'Emplois sur l'environnement (PDF) (in French), Ministère des Finances Project des Travaux Publics et de Création d'Emplois
- NASA Earth Observations: Population Density, NASA/SEDAC, archived from the original on 9 February 2016
- NASA Earth Observations Data Set Index, NASA, archived from the original on 28 November 2017
- NASA Earth Observations: Rainfall (1 month - TRMM), NASA/Tropical Rainfall Monitoring Mission, archived from the original on 19 April 2019
- Ngoyagoye, Lucie (15 July 2021), "Inquiétudes sur les effondrements des berges de la rivière Muha", Le Renouveau (in French)
- Niyungeko, Dorine; Hatangimana, Eddy (12 October 2022), "Fait du jour/Avenue du Large: les berges de la rivière Muha réhabilitées", Iwacu
- Niyongabo, Jean Marie Vianney (28 December 2018), Commune Muha : Les rivières menacent les infrastructures (in French)
- Niyongabo, Jean Marie Vianney (18 December 2020), "Rivières traversant la ville de Bujumbura : Reprise modérée des travaux de curage", Burundi Eco
- "Relation: Muha (17502768)", OpenStreetMap
