= Vénérand Kazohera =

Burundian businessman

- Born: Commune of Nyarusange, Gitega Province, Burundi
- Occupation: Businessman

Vénérand Kazohera is a Burundian businessman. He was a prominent supporter of the ruling CNDD-FDD party under president Pierre Nkurunziza (2005–2020), and remained active under president Evariste Ndayishimiye (from 2020).

== Nkurunziza regime ==
In October 2008 Vénérand Kazohera was among a large group of businesspeople who accompanied President Pierre Nkurunziza on a visit to Sweden. Kazohera became one of the best-known businessmen in Burundi, and was a major financier of the ruling CNDD-FDD. In May 2013 President Nkurunziza raised funds to complete construction of the Polytechnic University of Gitega (UPG) in Itankoma colline. Vénérand Kazohera was among the contributors, others being the CEOs of Interpetrol, Minolacs and Brarudi.

In 2017 Kazohera's father was assassinated in Gasenyi colline in the Commune of Nyarusange, Gitega Province. In July 2017 Pierre Nkurunziza, President of Burundi, laid the first sheet of metal on a large building in Nkondo colline, Commune of Nyarusange, that was to hold a school for paramedics. It was being built with the financial support of Vénérand Kazohera, who was a native of the place.

In December 2019 Pierre Nkurunziza, President of Burundi, visited Bujumbura Mairie Province to inaugurate buildings as part of Burundi's 57th anniversary celebrations. This included the Kinama Market in the Commune of Ntahangwa, and the Tokyo Business Center, a large shopping center built by Vénérand Kazohera. The center contains banks, supermarkets and other businesses.

== Ndayishimiye regime ==
In October 2020 Radio Publique Africaine reported that, following a fire at Kamenge Market, traders were concerned that management of the market was to be transferred to Vénérand Kazohera. Kazohera had donated a large amount of money towards the reconstruction, and had bought land very near the market. He was associated with the ruling CNDD-FDD party, whose president, Benjamin Ndagijimana, had tried to persuade the traders to temporarily move to Kinama, despite having no official role in the reconstruction.

In January 2021 Kazohera was arrested by the National Intelligence Service (Service national de renseignement, SNR). He was questioned and then released.

In January 2022 it emerged that Trinitas Girukwishaka, wife of Vénérand Kazohera, was the CEO of Bancobu, the Commercial Bank of Burundi. Kazohera's Intertrade-Kazohera-Tradeco Group, which was supplying equipment to the Ministry of Defense and Ministry of Public Security, had borrowed large amounts from Bancobu. The Bank of the Republic of Burundi (BRB) told Bancobu that it had violated the legal and regulatory provisions that govern banking practices by granting so much credit to one individual.

In March 2023 Gabriel Rufyiri, president of Olucome (Observatory for the fight against corruption and economic malfeasance), met the Prime Minister of Burundi. A few days later he attacked the "Burundian oligarchs", Olivier Suguru, Adrien Ntigacika and Vénérand Kazohera, who received all the public contracts. He said the national bank (BNB) reserved foreign currency for imports of medicines, fertilizers and fuel, which these individuals controlled. He also asked for clarity of how the "Prestige" company was awarded the fuel market.

Radio Publique Africaine (RPA) reported that leaders of the ruling CNDD-FDD party had visited the FOMI fertilizer factory in March 2024, led by Révérien Ndikuriyo, secretary-general of the party. Ndikuriyo was accompanied by Audace Niyonzima, Minister of Finance, Marie-Chantal Nijimbere, Minister of Commerce, Industry and Tourism, and Edouard Normand Bigendak, governor of the Central Bank. RPA reported that sources at the Ministry of Agriculture and Livestock had said the visit was to find ways to undermine the FOMI factory, and thus benefit another fertilizer factory due to be built in Gitega Province. Evariste Ndayishimiye, President of Burundi, would be the main shareholder in the new factory, but businessmen including Olivier Suguru and Vénérand Kazohera would also have shares.

== Sources ==
- Bigirimana, Raphaël (13 December 2019), "Le Chef de l'Etat poursuit l'inauguration des infrastructures d'intérêt public", Radio Télévision Nationale du Burundi (in French)
- Bujumbura : le directeur de la prison de Gitega détenu par les renseignements (in French), 21 January 2021
- "Burundi: Collecte de 420 000 USD pour l'Université UPG de GITEGA", AGnews (in French), 13 May 2013
- Lancement du camp de travail pour les jeunes en vacances (in French), Maison Ntare Rushatsi, 15 July 2017
- "Le marché de Kamenge en passe d'être attribué à certains ténors du parti Cndd-Fdd ?", Radio Publique Africaine (in French), 20 October 2020
- Manirakiza, Fabrice; Yikeze, Alphonse (28 January 2022), "BRB vs Bancobu : Le grand déballage", Iwacu (in French)
- Mbazumutima, Abbas (22 March 2023), "Olucome: "A small clique is getting rich on the backs of the taxpayer"", Iwacu (in French)
- Ndayishimiye one year on (PDF) (in French), The Burundi Human Rights Initiative, June 2021
- "Nkurunziza emmène avec lui une délégation impressionnante en Suède", Arib (in French), 2 October 2008
- "Que cache la visite du patron du CNDD-FDD à l'usine FOMI?", Radio Publique Africaine (in French), 7 April 2024
