= Kinindo Market =

- Market
- {{{other_names}}}
- Marché de Kinindo
- Location within Burundi
- Coordinates: 3.40675°S 29.34951°E

The Kinindo Market (French: Marché de Kinindo) is a public market in Bujumbura, Burundi.

== Events and issues ==
=== Original market ===
In October 2010 the mayor of Bujumbura decided to make some of the municipal markets more specialized. Kinindo Market would be a center for storage, supply and wholesale of food products. Wholesalers selling dried fish, hardware and second-hand clothes would be transferred to the modern Buyenzi Market.

In August 2011 there were 68 traders in 65 shops and stands. The police closed the stands of the second hand clothes stores, so they would move to Buyenzi Market. The vendors did not want to move, since they had spent a lot to set up their stands and would lose their customers if they moved. The president of the General Traders Union (Sygeco) asked the Burundian mediator to help in the dispute, copying the Minister of Industry, Trade and Tourism and the Minister of Privatization and Good Governance.

=== Rehabilitation ===
In 2016 seven markets in Bujumbura were closed so they could be rehabilitated with funding from the European Union. Traders were given a deadline of 18 January 2016 to vacate their stalls. Temporary sites were allocated for the markets. Kinama Market was given the Kinama zone football field, Ngagara Market had the Methodist Church field, Musaga Market had the SOCARTI field, Kinindo Market had the Kibenga field and Ruziba Market was relocated to a place called Kigobe beside the Mugere River. Some traders moved to the temporary markets, and others to different markets that remained open. The temporary market of Kibenga was in a poor site due to its proximity to the Kanyosha River.

=== New market ===
The market reopened on 3 July 2018, the second of the seven markets to be reopened. Two days later there was still the sound of welding, since the work was not complete. Some stands still had no doors, and others were closed. There was a large open space on the left side of the market for sale of second hand clothes, and another on the right side with goods such as mattresses. In the center there were a few fruit and vegetable traders with small quantities of produce, but no customers.

In July 2018, a week after the market reopened, about 50 traders had not yet received sales stalls. 1,200 stalls had been planned for the market, but few of them were functional. The company who was doing the work had not completed it, so some stalls still had to be renovated. The company returned the money to the traders so they could do the work themselves.

The mayor of Bujumbura decided to transfer all bus parking lots with connections to the south of the country to Kinindo Market, effective August 2021. On the first day, buses were parked haphazardly and were sinking into the sand and gravel of the parking lot. There was no shelter for waiting passengers. The parking lot did not have latrines, although there were said to be latrines in the market. The bus agencies had not all moved to the market.

== See also ==
- List of markets in Bujumbura

== Sources ==
- "Bujumbura: Les commerçants contraints de déménager temporairement", Isanganiro, 12 January 2016
- Harerimana, Egide (3 August 2021), "Parking du marché de Kinindo : les usagers dénoncent des irrégularités", Iwacu (in French)
- "Le marché de Kinindo rouvre ses portes après plus de deux ans de réhabitation", Radio Publique Africaine, 5 July 2018
- "Marché de Kinindo/ La Sygeco plaide pour les vendeurs de friperie", Iwacu (in French), 19 August 2011
- Nininahazwe, Gaudiose (19 June 2018), "Les stands des nouveaux marchés de la Mairie de Bujumbura seront bientôt occupés", Radio Télévision Nationale du Burundi (in French)
- "Une cinquantaine de commerçants du marché de Kinindo crient à l'injustice", RPA (in French), 12 July 2018
