= Ntahangwa River =

River in Burundi

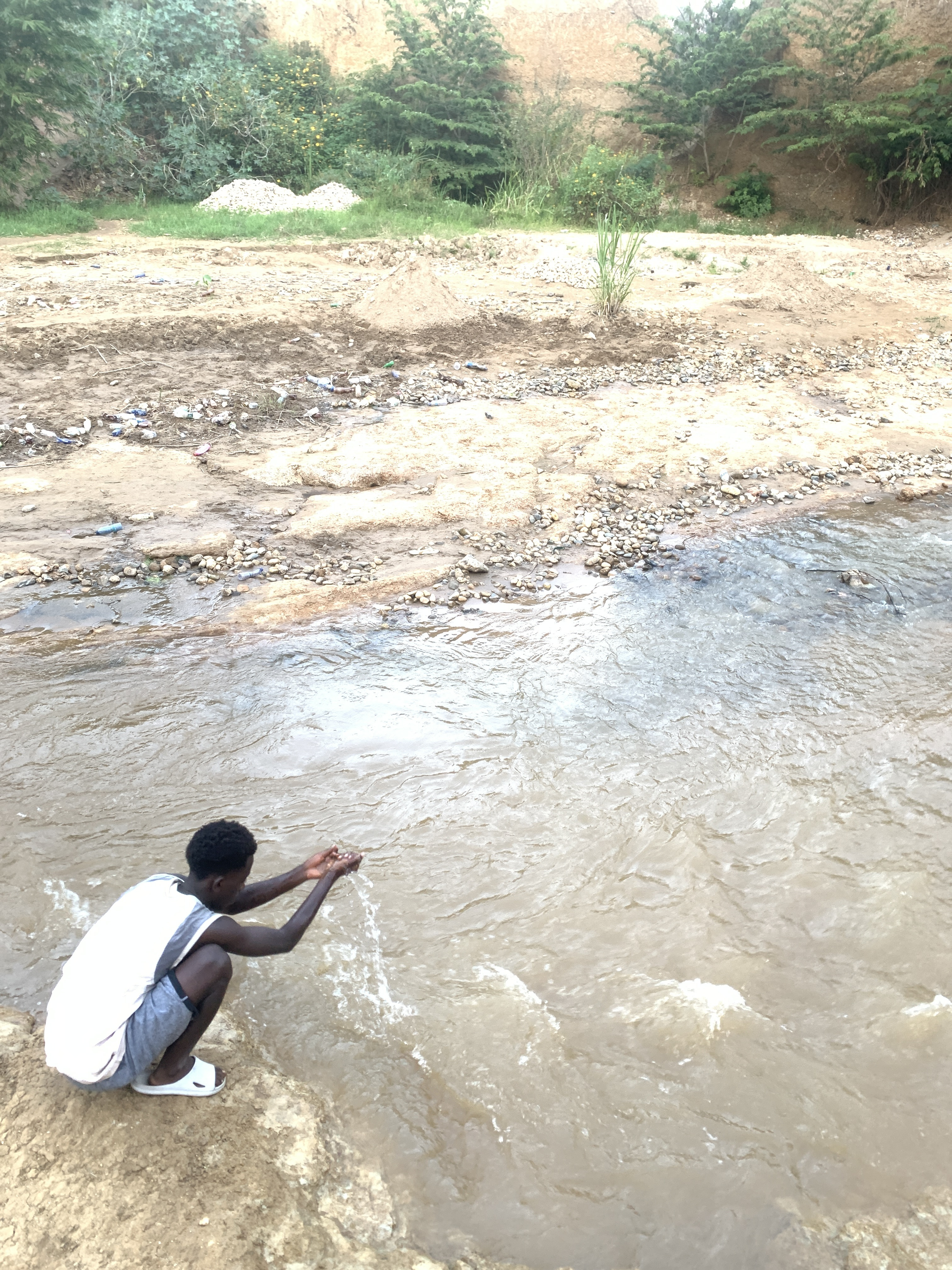

- Location within Burundi

Location
- Country: Burundi

Physical characteristics
- Mouth
  - coordinates: 3.37373°S 29.33842°E

The Ntahangwa River is a river in Burundi that flows through the city of Bujumbura.

== Course ==
The river forms in the east of Bujumbura Rural Province and flows in a generally east–west direction into Bujumbura Mairie Province and the city of Bujumbura, where it enters Lake Tanganyika.

== Environment ==
The area around the river is very densely populated, with 1,956 inhabitants per square kilometer as of 2016. Savannah climate prevails in the area. The average annual temperature in the area is 20 °C (68 °F). The warmest month is August, when the average temperature is 25 °C (77 °F), and the coldest is January, with 18 °C (64 °F). Average annual rainfall is 1,086 millimetres (42.8 in). The wettest month is December, with an average of 154 millimetres (6.1 in) of precipitation, and the driest is July, with 3 millimetres (0.12 in) of precipitation.

== Issues and events ==
In 1983 and 1986 the Ntahangwa River flooded the northwest of Bujumbura. Houses were destroyed in the Buyenzi quarter, and damage was done to the stocks of SEP, COGERCO, RAFINA and the Port of Bujumbura.

The Ntahangwa River is the most polluted stream flowing into Lake Tanganyika from Burundi. Despite this, a 1996 study concluded that its direct effect on the lake is negligible.

During a period of heavy rain in December 2016 the river flooded houses and two streets in the Kigobe and Mutanga Sud neighbourhoods of Bujumbura. An executive of the environment ministry said the river would be rehabilitated in the next three months.

In June 2017 residents in the rural Gikungu area of the Commune of Ntahangwa had been without water from REGIDESO Burundi for three months. They were forced to take water from the Ntahangwa River, but were afraid of catching diseases from the dirty water. REGIDESO said it was working on a solution.

In 2020 Burundian Office of Urban Planning, Housing and Construction (OBUHA) banned commercial dredging of the Muha, Kanyosha, Ntahangwa, Mutimbuzi and other rivers of Bujumbura, since only OBUHA had the proper equipment for mechanical dredging, and manual dredging could not handle large rocks in the river bed. However, given lack of funding and the risk of floods, the agency soon allowed the cooperatives that did manual dredging to resume work. The cooperatives would pay OBUHA for the construction materials they retrieved, and were committed to building dikes and planting trees to protect the river banks.

In 2024 supporters of the English Arsenal F.C. football club and the Youth Committed to Environmental Advocacy (YCEA Burundi) planted 1,200 anti-erosion trees along the banks of the river.

== See also ==
- List of rivers of Burundi

== Sources ==
- "1,200 anti-erosion trees have been planted on the coast of the Ntahangwa River", Burundi News Agency, 12 March 2024
- Butoyi, Rosette (6 December 2016), Ntahangwa River threatens nearby residents in rainy season
- NASA Earth Observations: Population Density, NASA/SEDAC, archived from the original on 9 February 2016
- NASA Earth Observations Data Set Index, NASA, archived from the original on 11 May 2020
- NASA Earth Observations: Rainfall (1 month - TRMM), NASA/Tropical Rainfall Monitoring Mission, archived from the original on 19 April 2019
- Nduwayo, Alexandre (20 June 2017), "Water shortage in rural Gikungu pushes residents to use Ntahangwa River water", IWACU English News
- Niyongabo, Jean Marie Vianney (18 December 2020), "Rivières traversant la ville de Bujumbura : Reprise modérée des travaux de curage", Burundi Eco
- Projet de developpement du corridor de transport sur le port de bujumbura et du lac tanganyika et la rehabilitation des voies d’acces au port (PDF), Autorité Maritime, Portuaire et Ferroviaire, August 2019
- "Relation: Ntahangwa (17502767)", OpenStreetMap
- Vandelannoote, A; Robberecht, H; Deelstra, H; Vyumvuhore, F; Bitetera, L \; Ollevier, Frans (1996), "The impact of the River Ntahangwa, the most polluted Burundian affluent of Lake Tanganyika, on the water quality of the lake", Hydrobiologia, 328 (2): 161–171
