= Freddy Mbonimpa =

Mayor of Bujumbura
- In office 2015–2020
- Preceded by: Saidi Juma
- Succeeded by: Jimmy Hatungimana

Personal details
- Born: Musaga
- Occupation: Directeur National de la Médiation et de l'Éducation Citoyenne at the Ombudsman Institution

Freddy Mbonimpa is a Burundian politician who was mayor of Bujumbura from 2015 to 2020. He held office during a period of political unrest after the decision of the President of Burundi to run for a third term.

== Appointment as mayor ==
In October 2015 the President of the National Assembly asked the constitutional court to declare that the seat of deputy Freddy Mbonimpa was vacant, since he had been named Mayor of Bujumbura by a decree of 2 September 2015. The court agreed.

== Security issues ==
Civil unrest began in April 2015 when President Pierre Nkurunziza announced his intention of running for a third term. In November 2015 about ten people attacked Freddy Mbonimpa's house in Rohero, shooting and throwing grenades. There were no deaths. In December 2015 the president of Burundi named Freddy Mbonimpa to the National Security Council.

In February 2016 Mbonimpa banned motorbikes from the city center after motorbike taxis were used in several grenade attacks. The proposal by the African Union to deploy a peacekeeping force in Burundi had been rejected, and peace talks between the government and representatives of the opposition had broken down. Security forces and opposition activists each blamed the other side for these attacks.

On just one day in May 2016 about a hundred people were arrested in the district of Musaga, where pro-opposition protest had been staged. Mbonimpa justified the operation on the basis of the need to achieve control of the movements of the population. All heads of households were required to file a "household notebook" with the municipality that named the members of the household, parents and servants. They were also required to report the names of all visitors.

In June 2017 Mbonimpa banned the opposition coalition "Amizero y'Abarundi" (Hope of Burundians) from holding a press conference, saying it "does not have legal personality in the eyes of the law." The exiled president of the coalition, Pierre Célestin Ndikumana of the FNL, said the regime wanted to prevent deputies from denouncing the many cases of extrajudicial executions, arbitrary arrests or forced disappearances of FNL members.

In May 2019 Freddy Mbonimpa addressed the security committees of all communes, zones and neighborhoods of the city of Bujumbura. He noted that the 2020 elections were approaching and asked the grassroots committees to monitor the movements of all people who may disturb public order, to make sure household notebooks were up to date, and to provide reports on security issues. He addressed other issues such as the trade in prohibited drinks and narcotics, noisy bars, bar opening times, bandit attacks in unlit places and closure of the Buterere garbage dump.

On 16 March 2020 Mbonimpa held a meeting to discuss security with for municipal administrators, neighborhood leaders and security bodies. Participants raised concerns about drug use among young people, and products being sold at prices other than those set by the government, such as sugar, cement and Brarudi products. The Brarudi and Buceco factory executives were present at the meeting and said their prices had not been raised. They discussed tightening measures to enforce opening and closing hours of cabarets and decided to suspend mobile casino games.

== Other activity ==
In February 2017 Freddy Mbonimpa invited municipal administrators to a meeting about the rental tax. In the past, this tax had been collected by Bujumbura Mairie and other communes in Burundi but was now to be collected by the OBR for the state. 40% of the revenues would be retained by the state, and 60% of revenues would go to the communes. The OBR expected to be able to collect more of the tax owing than the communes.

On 27 June 2017 Freddy Mbonimpa said the parking lot for trans-city vehicles should move from the Gare du Nord to a parking lot opposite Cotebu Market. Taxis leaving for Gitega, Ngozi, Kayanza, Muramvya and Kirundo would also have to move to Cotebu Market.

In March 2019 Mbonimpa accepted the rehabilitation of the channel of the Nyabagere River that runs under the NR1 highway in Kamenge zone, Ntahangwa commune. The banks of the river had been protected with reinforced bar retaining walls on a concrete footing, the right bank had been backfilled, and bamboos had been planted. The project was initiated after torrential rain in March and April 2017. The Burundi Agency for Public Works Achievement (ABUTIP) had undertaken the work with World Bank financing as part of the Emergency Infrastructure Resilience Project (PURI).

On 17 September 2019 Mbonimpa outlined preparations for the Torch of Peace caravan, which would visit Bujumbura for the first time in 13 years two days later. September 2019. He called on everyone in the city to take part in the activities.

On 16 November 2019 Mbonimpa gave a press briefing where he described implementation of measures such as joint security committees, verification of household registers, bans on prohibited drinks, suspension of street trading in the Commune of Mukaza, removal of vehicles abandoned on public highways, closure of film screening houses and brothels, cleaning of gutters, lighting of plots and monitoring compliance with BUCECO cement prices. He confirmed that bistros should open from 1 p.m. to 9 p.m. on weekends and public holidays and from 5 p.m. to 9 p.m. on working days. There would be severe penalties for businesses trying to bypass these rules.

Later in 2020 Freddy Mbonimpa was succeeded as mayor of Bujumbara by Jimmy Hatungimana.

== Sources ==
- Arret RCCB 320 de la Cour Constitutionelle du Burundi (PDF) (in French), Cour Constitutionelle, 2015
- "Au moins 100 Burundais arrêtés dans des rafles devenues quasi-quotidiennes", VOA, 13 May 2016
- Bigirimana, Raphaël (16 December 2019), "Les boutiques qui fonctionnent comme des bistrots risquent d'être fermées (Freddy Mbonimpa)", Radio Télévision Nationale du Burundi (in French)
- "Burundi Bans Motorbikes From Center of Capital After Grenade Attacks", Newsweek, 17 February 2016
- "Deadly violence rocks Burundi's capital", Al Jazeera, 15 November 2015
- Decret No 100/115 du 10 Decembre 2015 portant nomination des membres do conseil national de securite (PDF) (in French), President of Burundi
- de Dieu, Jean (18 March 2019), "Reception of works of drainage at the Nyabagere River", ABP
- Des détournements de fonds au razzia des marchandises au marché de Kamenge (in French), FORSC Burundi, 23 October 2020
- "Le Flambeau de la paix en Mairie de Bujumbura pour la 13ème fois", Magazine Ejo (in French), 17 September 2019
- "Le maire de Bujumbura interdit la tenue d'une conférence de presse de l'opposition", Agence Afrique (in French)
- L’OBR et la Mairie de Bujumbura se mobilisent pour la réussite de la collecte de l’Impôt Locatif (in French), OBR, 16 February 2017
- Ndaribaze, Jean Marie (24 May 2019), "Mairie de Bujumbura: les administratifs incoséquents sur la sellette (Freddy Mbonimpa)", Radio Télévision Nationale du Burundi (in French)
- Nikiza, Egide (3 July 2017), "Deux mesures pour plus de rentabilité du marché dit Cotebu", Iwacu (in French)
- Nininahazwe, Gaudiose (17 March 2020), "Mairie de Bujumbura: les comités mixtes de sécurité appelés à redoubler de vigilance", Radio Télévision Nationale du Burundi (in French)
