= ARNOLAC =

Société de l’Armement Nord des Grands Lacs
- Trade name: ARNOLAC
- Industry: Transport
- Founded: 10 July 1969; 57 years ago
- Headquarters: Bujumbura, Burundi
- Global Port Services Burundi in Bujumbura (Burundi)

Société de l’Armement Nord des Grands Lacs (Northern Great Lakes Armament Company: ARNOLAC), is a private company that operates a fleet of cargo boats on Lake Tanganyika. It is based in the Port of Bujumbura in Burundi.

== Origins ==
ARNOLAC has its origins in the fleet managed by the Belgian Compagnie des Grands Lacs (C.G.L.). In 1965 the fleet was shared equally between the Société Nationale des Chemins de fer Zaïrois (S.N.C.Z.) and what would become the Société de l’Armement Nord des Grands Lacs (ARNOLAC). ARNOLAC began business on 10 July 1969. It was 90% owned by private capital, with the state owning 10%.

(A joint commission was set up to examine the ownership of Global Port Services Burundi in October 2021. The commission recommended an inquiry into how 18 boats transferred from the Kingdom of Belgium to Burundi had been acquired by ARNOLAC.)

== History ==
As of 1990 ARNOLAC was the largest merchant shipping company in Burundi. Its competitors were BATRALAC, SOTRALAC and Tanganyika Transport. ARNOLAC owned five tugs, four self-propelled vessels and around ten barges including two fuel tanker barges, with a total capacity of 5,000 tonnes. It also operated the "Muhabura", a container ship given to the State of Burundi by France. Apart from the "Birikunzira", a 200-ton self-propelled boat built in 1979, the fleet dated to colonial times, built between 1890 and 1965. Their last refits had been between 1973 and 1986.

In July 1996 Pierre Buyoya staged a coup and regained power in Burundi. The regional countries in Central and East Africa imposed an economic embargo on the country, and trade ground to a halt. In October 1996, 264 workers out of 300 at the Port of Bujumbura were laid off. ARNOLAC, which normally had 300 workers, now had just three remaining at its central office. ARNOLAC ships were docked in Kigoma and Mpulungu when the embargo was declared. They were still being held in Kigoma, with cargo that included 3,000 tons of fertilizer and a shipment of grain sent by the World Food Programme.

In 2012 and 2013 ARNOLAC transported up to 10,000 tonnes per month. Products included cement, reinforcing bars, sugar and maize from Zambia, and goods and cement from Kigoma in Tanzania. The Burundian company Buceco had begun to manufacture cement, eliminating demand for imports, and Zambia banned export of corn. By the start of 2015 cargo volumes had fallen to 4,000 tonnes per month. There was a political crisis in 2015 when Burundian president Pierre Nkurunziza decided to run for a third term. The combined volumes carried by ARNOLAC and BATRALAC fell to 2,000 tonnes per month.

Iwacu, a weekly newspaper, published an article in August 2022 that examined the cost of shipping fuel via rail to the port of Kigoma, Tanzania, and then by boat to Bujumbura, as an alternative to trucking the fuel to Bujumbura. It noted that it had been more than 10 years since Burundi importers had used this route. A train from Dar es Salaam to Kigoma took two days when there were no problems. ARNOLAC had boats that could carry 500 cubic metres (18,000 cu ft) of fuel from Kigoma to Bujumbura in six to twelve hours. Trucks from Dar es Salaam to Bujumbura could take longer, and would cost 40% more. The railway was due to be renovated, which would further reduce transport times. The problem seemed to be that the importers had invested in trucks and did not want to change.

ARNOLAC is a member of MOESNA, formerly the Intergovernmental Standing Committee on Shipping (ISCOS). In February-March 2023 ISCOS organized a meeting of representatives of national and regional shipping lines where they agreed to create a regional shipping line owned by the private sector, and to push for of a regional cabotage framework to create greater flexibility by letting regional lines fill capacity gaps left by national lines.

As of 2024, shipping on Lake Tanganyika was dominated by companies based in Burundi, including ARNOLAC, BATRALAC and RAD Marine. ARNOLAC operated seven barges, four tugboats and two oil tankers. In total it could carry about 5,000 tons, 535 cubic metres (18,900 cu ft).

== Fleet ==
As of 2012 the ARNOLAC fleet was:

Name of Vessel	Type of Vessel	Length Overall (m)	Width (m)	Dead Weight (ton)	Draft in Charge (m)	State	In-service Year
Kizigenza	Tug Line	33.50	7.58	66	3.25	G.E	1955
Tanganyika	Tug Line	31.20	5.18	37	1.58	G.E	1889
Krimiro	Tug Line	23.50	4.55	25	-	S	1915
Moso	Harbour Tug in Kigoma	12.25	3.00	9	-	G.E	1958
Ruremesha	Mixed Cargo Ship	41.25	9.00	350	2.25	G.E	1981
Ndaje	Mixed Cargo Ship	54.75	8.70	600	3.20	G	2002
Cohoha	Tank Barge	42.35	7.00	336	2.71	G.E	1955
Rweru	Tank Barge	32.71	5.58	115	1.64	G.E	1953
Sagamba	Bulk Cargo Barge	65.70	10.00	1,397	3.77	S	1955
Murinzi	Bulk Cargo Barge	59.60	9.02	885	3.26	G.E	1931
Buragane	Bulk Cargo Barge	54.50	8.50	627	2.61	S	1937
Mumirwa	Bulk Cargo Barge	52.77	8.82	544	2.75	G.E	1955
Buyenzi	Bulk Cargo Barge	52.77	8.82	538	2.75	S	1955
Remera	Bulk Cargo Barge	47.25	8.00	477	2.36	S	1927
Buyogoma	Bulk Cargo Barge	36.50	6.00	278	2.17	S	1918
Imbo	Bulk Cargo Barge	37.77	6.50	246	2.08	S	1929
Baraka	Bulk Cargo Barge	47.25	8.00	-	-	W	1925
Tanganyika	Tourism & Research	25.30	6.86	125	-	V.G	1994

State: S = Suspended / V.G = Very Good / G = Good / G.E = Good Enough

== See also ==
- List of companies of Burundi
- Economy of Burundi

== Sources ==
- "BURUNDI: Bujumbura, un puerto desolado", IPS (in Spanish), 3 October 1996
- Burundi Port of Bujumbura, Logistics Cluster
- Burundi Transporters, Logistics Cluster
- Manirakiza, Fabrice (8 August 2022), "Carburant : A qui profite la voie routière ?", Iwacu (in French)
- Ngendakumana, Philippe (30 July 2015), "Transport international : malaise sur le Tanganyika", Iwacu (in French)
- Niyongabo, Jean Marie Vianney (21 March 2023), "Global Port Services Burundi : L'actionnariat de l'Etat représente plus de 64%", Burundi Eco (in French)
- Resolutions of the stakeholders’ consultative forum for national and regional shipping lines and maritime administration held from 27th February 2023 to 1st March 2023 at Four Points by Sheraton hotel in Dar es Salaam, Tanzania (PDF), ISCOS
- Sirven, Pierre (May 1991), "Les transports sur le lac Tanganyika. In: L'eau et l'aménagement", l’Afrique des grands lacs. (in French), Colloque de Bujumbura – via Talence : Centre de recherche sur les espaces tropicaux, 1993. pp. 281-308
- Study of Master Plan for Port Sector in the Republic of Burundi (PDF), Ministry of Transport, Public Works and Equipment, Japan International Cooperation Agency, September 2012
