= Teza =

Teza may refer to:

- The Teza (river), a river in Russia
- Teza (film), a 2008 Ethiopian drama film
- Elvire Teza, a French Olympic gymnast
- Teza (gymnastics), one of several moves introduced into gymnastics by Elvire Teza
- Teza (magazine), Israeli student magazine
- MV Teza, a ship based in Bujumbura, Burundi
