= Mutimbuzi River =

River in Burundi

- Location within Burundi
- Native name: Rivière Mutimbuzi (French)

Location
- Country: Burundi
- Province: Bujumbura Rural Province

Physical characteristics
- Mouth: Ruzizi River
  - coordinates: 3.359295°S 29.327646°E

The Mutimbuzi River (French: Rivière Mutimbuzi) is a river in Bujumbura Rural Province, Burundi.

== Watershed ==
The Mutimbuzi River watershed is north of the city of Bujumbura between 3°12’00" and 3°24’30" South latitude and 29°19’00" and 29°34’00" East longitude. Although the Mutimbuzi River is a tributary of Lake Tanganyika, it drains part of the Ruzizi plain.

The watershed includes parts of three ecoclimatic regions: the Imbo plain, the Mumirwa foothills and the Congo-Nile ridge. Altitudes range from 759 to 2,505 metres (2,490 to 8,219 ft). The upper watershed is in a mountainous massif with steep slopes. Lower down it is in the Mumirwa foothills. The downstream part in the Imbo Plain has V-shaped valley with low slopes, and is most exposed to the risk of flooding.

Average temperatures range from over 23 °C (73 °F) in the Imbo Plain to 14 to 15 °C (57 to 59 °F) on the Congo-Nile ridge. Average annual rainfall ranges from 800–1,100 millimetres (31–43 in) in the Imbo plain to 1,300–200 millimetres (51.2–7.9 in) on the Congo-Nile ridge. The rainy season generally extends from October to May and the dry season goes from June to September.

== Course ==
The Mutimbuzi River rises in the Kavya colline in the Commune of Muramvya, Muramvya Province. Its three main tributaries are the Muzazi, Murago and Gikoma. The Mutimbuzi flows through the Commune of Mutimbuzi, along the east side of the Melchior Ndadaye International Airport and under the RN4 coastal highway before emptying into Lake Tanganyika.

About 10 kilometres (6.2 mi) from the Rusizi the Mpanda River, a tributary of the Ruzizi, crosses an enormous expanse of marshes that connects to the Mutimbuzi River basin. The Mutimbuzi's mouth on Lake Tanganyika is about 8 kilometres (5.0 mi) from that of the Ruzizi.

== Flooding ==
The Mutimbuzi has a very changeable course, and feeds many ponds during the rainy season. It has very low flow in the dry season but becomes a torrent in the rainy season.

In April 2018 the Mutimbuzi River in the Buterere area, which had been diverted from its bed, had destroyed over 300 houses, flooded others and devastated many fields.

In October 2018 the Burundi Civil Aviation Authority began dredging the Mutimbuzi River to prevent it from flooding into the airport. Drains would also be installed to prevent flooding. Removal of alluvium and other waste from the river would begin downstream and continue up to the NR5 highway from Bujumbura to Rugombo.

In 2020 Burundian Office of Urban Planning, Housing and Construction (OBUHA) banned commercial dredging of the Muha, Kanyosha, Ntahangwa, Mutimbuzi and other rivers of Bujumbura, since only OBUHA had the proper equipment for mechanical dredging, and manual dredging could not handle large rocks in the river bed. However, given lack of funding and the risk of floods, the agency soon allowed the cooperatives that did manual dredging to resume work. The cooperatives would pay OBUHA for the construction materials they retrieved, and were committed to building dikes and planting trees to protect the river banks.

== See also ==
- List of rivers of Burundi

== Sources ==
- Hicintuka, Jean-Marie (3 October 2018), "Démarrage des travaux de curage de la rivière Mutimbuzi pour protéger l'aéroport international de Bujumbura", Agence Burundaise de Presse (in French)
- Mpawenayo, Balthazar (1996), Les eaux de la plaine de la Rusizi (Burundi) (PDF) (in French), Académie Royale des Sciences d'Outre-Mer, ISBN 90-75652-01-1
- "Relation: Mutimbuzi (17502766)", OpenStreetMap
- Mugisha, Elvis (30 April 2018), "La rivière Mutimbuzi crée des dégâts dans la zone de Buterere", Iwacu (in French)
- Niyongabo, Jean Marie Vianney (18 December 2020), "Rivières traversant la ville de Bujumbura : Reprise modérée des travaux de curage", Burundi Eco
- Twagirayezu, Eugénie (December 2021), Contribution a l’etude de la gestion integree des ressources en eau pour une irrigation optimisee et une lutte contre les inondations : Cas du bassin versant de la riviere Mutimbuzi en Republique du Burundi (Thesis) (in French), Bujumbura: University of Burundi
