= Ruziba Market =

- Market
- {{{other_names}}}
- Marché de Ruziba
- Location within Burundi
- Coordinates: 3.47384°S 29.35021°E

The Ruziba Market (French: Marché de Ruziba) is a public market in the south of Bujumbura, Burundi.

== Events and issues ==
=== Old market ===
Ruziba Market is in the Ruziba quarter of the Kanyosha zone, Commune of Muha, Bujumbura Mairie Province.

In May 2014 a block of latrines was opened at the market, and daily visits quickly increased from 300 to over 1,000. There were 3 latrines, 2 showers and a sink in the women's block, and 2 latrines, 2 urinals and a sink in the men's block. The latrines were built with help from the Luxembourg Red Cross. The lack of latrines and drinking water had previously caused diseases such as cholera.

=== Reconstruction ===
In 2016 seven markets in Bujumbura were closed so they could be rehabilitated with funding from the European Union. Traders were given a deadline of 18 January 2016 to vacate their stalls. Temporary sites were allocated for the markets. Kinama Market was given the Kinama zone football field, Ngagara Market had the Methodist Church field, Musaga Market had the SOCARTI field, Kinindo Market had the Kibenga field and Ruziba Market was relocated to a place called Kigobe beside the Mugere River. Some traders moved to the temporary markets, and others to different markets that remained open.

In November 2016, ambassadors from the European Union visited the market accompanied by the Mayor of Bujumbura to assess progress of construction. The modern market was being built on a 1,667 square metres (17,940 sq ft) site, with over 620 stalls and four hangars. It would have modern security, evacuation and fire protection systems. Over 600 people were working on the project, which began in January 2016 and was expected to complete early in 2017.

=== Temporary market ===
While the Ruziba Market was being rebuilt, it was temporarily relocated to a site beside the Mugere River, which divides Bujumbura Mairie Province from the Commune of Kabezi in Bujumbura Rural Province. The temporary market was established 1 kilometre (0.62 mi) from the old Ruziba market.

In January 2016 the river overflowed and swept away more than 50 market stalls and some goods. It caused flooding in shops under construction in the market, and the collapse of some plots of land. The market still did not have access to drinking water, and the latrines were still being built. In January 2018 traders in the temporary market were demanding that the rebuilt market be opened, since it had been declared complete and officially accepted in August 2017.

=== Modern market ===
Ruziba Market finally reopened around January 2019. It had been renovated at a cost of about 1 million euros, provided by the European Union. It has over 600 stalls, a cold room and three hangars. As of September 2020 there was still no electricity in the market, a particular problem for sellers of fresh fish and meat.

The market is in a poor area, and customers from the city center do not visit it. As of January 2021 many of the stalls were unoccupied. Customers from the new Nyabugete quarter came to buy fruit and vegetables, and other customers came from the nearby collines of Kabezi, Burima and Nyamaboko. The market sells Ndagala fish from Rumonge Province, either fresh or smoked, or cooked at the market.

== See also ==
- List of markets in Bujumbura

== Sources ==
- "Bujumbura: Les commerçants contraints de déménager temporairement", Isanganiro, 12 January 2016
- Habarugira, Bruce (29 January 2021), "Marché de Ruziba : De nombreuses échoppes restent cadenassées", Burundi Eco (in French)
- Le marché de Ruziba désormais pourvu en latrines (in French), Croix-Rouge du Burundi, 9 May 2014
- "Les pluies de ce dimanche ont endommagé le marché de Ruziba", Isanganiro (in French), 18 January 2016
- "Marché Ruziba : Des commerçants qui se lamentent", IndundiCulture Radio (in French), 18 September 2020
- Nininahazwe, Caritas (21 November 2016), "L'UE inspecte l'avancement de la construction des marchés de Bujumbura.", Radio Télévision Nationale du Burundi (in French)
- Nininahazwe, Gaudiose (19 June 2018), "Les stands des nouveaux marchés de la Mairie de Bujumbura seront bientôt occupés", Radio Télévision Nationale du Burundi (in French)
- Nzeyimana, Martine (15 January 2016), "Nouveau marché de Ruziba dans les eaux", Iwacu (in French)
- "Ruziba, marché réceptionné mais non fonctionnel", Isanganiro (in French), 22 January 2018
