= Kanyosha River =

River in Burundi

- Location within Burundi
- Native name: Rivière Kanyosha (French)

Location
- Country: Burundi

Physical characteristics
- Mouth
  - coordinates: 3.431795°S 29.340470°E

The Kanyosha River (French: Rivière Kanyosha) is a river in Burundi that flows through the south of Bujumbura. Erosion of the banks is a constant issue in the urban areas it passes through.

== Course ==
The Kanyosha River rises in central Bujumbura Rural Province and flows west past Buhonga to enter the south of Bujumbura Mairie Province, where it flows through the Commune of Muha and Commune of Kanyosha to its mouth on Lake Tanganyika. Elevations in the watershed vary from 758 to 2,537 metres (2,487 to 8,323 ft). Landslides occur in about 3% of the area.

== Maintenance ==
In 2020 Burundian Office of Urban Planning, Housing and Construction (OBUHA) banned commercial dredging of the Kanyosha, Muha, Ntahangwa, Mutimbuzi and other rivers of Bujumbura, since only OBUHA had the proper equipment for mechanical dredging, and manual dredging could not handle large rocks in the river bed. However, given lack of funding and the risk of floods, the agency soon allowed the cooperatives that did manual dredging to resume work. The cooperatives would pay OBUHA for the construction materials they retrieved, and were committed to building dikes and planting trees to protect the river banks.

In December 2022 the administrator of Muha commune noted that the commune had planted over sixty thousand trees on the banks of the Muha, Kanyosha, Kizingwe and Kamesa rivers.

== Issues ==
In November 2021 the banks of the river collapsed in the Busoro district of the Commune of Muha, causing some houses to collapse and threatening others. The bridge between the Musaga and Kanyosha areas was also threatened. Although people had planted trees along the banks, that was not always effective. The residents blamed extraction of stones and gravel for construction for the problem.

In June 2022 it was reported that the Kanyosha River bed between the Kinanira district of the Musaga zone and Musama district of the Kanyosha zone continued to widen, and had formed a large ravine along the river. Trees meant to protect the banks were falling into the river. The bridge between the two zones was at risk of collapsing, because the retaining walls had been weakened. Uncontrolled extraction of sand and gravel was the cause. OBUHA said rehabilitation work would start soon.

In April 2023 a ravine on the river widened and destroyed five houses, threatening others. The general commissioner of OBUHA said that the ravines would be repaired gradually as funding permitted, but warned that houses should not be built closer than 50 metres (160 ft) from the edge of a ravine. On the question of extraction of building materials, he noted that cooperatives engaged in this work were signing contracts with OBUHA and paying taxes that would help fund repair of the ravines.

== Other events ==
In July 2021 a suspension bridge for pedestrians was completed over the Kanyosha bridge between the Busoro neighborhood in the Kanyosha zone and the Kinanira neighborhood in the Musaga zone. It is 78 metres (256 ft) long and 1.2 metres (3 ft 11 in) wide. The project was funded by the African Development Bank and undertaken by the Nepalese company, "Bridge Technology", supervised by the Swiss company, "Helvetas Swiss Intercooperation".

== See also ==
- List of rivers of Burundi

== Sources ==
- Hakizimana, Claude (15 December 2022), "Commune Muha : Mise en œuvre des projets de développement communautaire", Le Renouveau (in French)
- Harerimana, Egide (23 November 2021), "Muha/Busoro : la rivière Kanyosha menace ses riverains", Iwacu (in French)
- Harerimana, Egide (26 April 2023), "Kanyosha/Musama : Cinq maisons déjà emportées par un ravin de la rivière Kanyosha", Iwacu (in French)
- Kubwimana, Désiré; AIT Brahim, Lahsen; Bousta, Mahfoud; Dewitte, Olivier; Abdellah, Abdelouafi; Bahaj, T. (January 2018), Landslides susceptibility assessment using AHP method in Kanyosha watershed (Bujumbura-Burundi): Urbanisation and management impacts, vol. 149, MATEC Web of Conferences, doi:10.1051/matecconf/201814902071
- Mbazumutima, Eric (20 June 2022), "La réhabilitation de la rivière Kanyosha s'avère nécessaire avant qu'il ne soit trop tard", Le Renouveau
- Nibitanga, Michel (11 August 2021), Que disent les usagers du pont piétonnier suspendu de Kanyosha après sa construction? (in French), Archidiocèse Catholique de Bujumbura
- Niyongabo, Jean Marie Vianney (18 December 2020), "Rivières traversant la ville de Bujumbura : Reprise modérée des travaux de curage", Burundi Eco
- "Relation: Kanyosha (17502769)", OpenStreetMap
