= Jabe Market =

- Market
- {{{other_names}}}
- Marché de Jabe
- Location within Burundi
- Coordinates: 3.37113°S 29.37130°E

The Jabe Market (French: Marché de Jabe) is a public market in the Bwiza zone of Mukaza Commune, Bujumbura, Burundi.

== Events and issues ==
A fire broke out at Bujumbura Central Market early in the morning of 27 January 2013 and destroyed the market. Nothing was done to rebuild that market. Traders moved to the Jabe Market, Ruvumera Market and Bujumbura City Market, which flourished as a result.

Jabe Market historically specialized in used shoes and different kinds of leathers. The market contained more than 2,500 stands. A January 2014 report described unsanitary conditions at the Jabe Market, with a mountain of bad-smelling garbage piled up near the market. However, some traders said the pile of waste was useful, since they could find objects in it they could repair and resell.

In 2016 seven markets in Bujumbura were closed so they could be rehabilitated with funding from the European Union, including Jabe. Traders were given a deadline of 18 January 2016 to vacate their stalls. Temporary sites were allocated for the markets. The site for the Jabe Market had not been allocated, since the land was not available yet.

On 14 January 2016 it was reported that Jabe Market would temporarily move to the grounds of Bwiza Municipal High School. A week before the move, the grounds had not been prepared. The school was concerned about noise and the problem of sharing latrines. The traders were concerned about the distance from the old market, although they had been reassured that rehabilitation would only take five months. When the rehabilitation of Jabe Market by the Getra company started, the used shoe traders moved to Bujumbura City Market.

In June 2018 the rehabilitation work on Jabe Market was very advanced.

In September 2020 Bujumbura Mairie ordered that all vendors of used shoes at Bujumbura City Market had to return to the rehabilitated Jabe Market. The Bujumbura City Market (BCM) commissioner said the return to Jabe market would badly affect the BCM economy. The BCM had invested large amounts in developing a space for the used shoe traders, and there were many other reasons why the move would be wrong. Although there was some resistance, the traders soon found they had a large, airy area to place their stands, and within a month customers were returning.

== See also ==
- List of markets in Bujumbura

== Sources ==
- "Bujumbura: Les commerçants contraints de déménager temporairement", Isanganiro, 12 January 2016
- Burundi – proposition visant l’octroi d’un don de 500 000 dollars eu au titre de l’aide d’urgence destine au programme d’actions visant a attenuer les effets de l’incendie du marche central de Bujumbura (PDF) (in French), African Development Bank Group, 2013
- "Ils réclament la transparence au marché de Jabe", Radio Publique Africaine (in French), 18 September 2014
- Irabaruta, Chanelle (2 October 2020), "Retour des commerçants des chaussures usagées au marché de Jabe : Les concernés se lamentent", Burundi Eco (in French)
- Kuriyo, Benjamin (28 January 2020), "A quand la reconstruction du marché central de Bujumbura ?", Burundi Eco (in French)
- "Le marché de Jabe déménage vers le terrain du lycée municipal Bwiza", Isanganiro (in French), 14 January 2016
- Mbonimpa, Samuel (26 November 2020), "Marché de Jabe : quand l'angoisse fait place à la satisfaction", Iwacu (in French)
- Nininahazwe, Gaudiose (19 June 2018), "Les stands des nouveaux marchés de la Mairie de Bujumbura seront bientôt occupés", Radio Télévision Nationale du Burundi (in French)
- Sabiteka, Alida (16 January 2014), "L'insalubrité qui règne au marché de Jabe n'est pas perçu de la même façon", IGIHE (in French)
