= Bujumbura City Market =

Bujumbura City Market Kwa Siyoni
- Market
- Address: Commune of Ntahangwa
- Location within Burundi
- Coordinates: 3.36358°S 29.35742°E

The Bujumbura City Market (Kirundi: Kwa Siyoni) is a public market in Bujumbura, Burundi.

== Events and issues ==
A fire broke out at Bujumbura Central Market early in the morning of 27 January 2013 and destroyed the market. Nothing was done to rebuild that market. Traders moved to the Jabe Market, Ruvumera Market and Bujumbura City Market, which flourished as a result.

The market contains agencies of bus and taxi businesses that take customers to the Democratic Republic of the Congo (DRC), Rwanda, Uganda and Tanzania. In March 2020, several of these agencies were closed due to the government decision to close all the borders of Burundi to reduce the spread of COVID-19. Traders who relied on customers from the DRC lost business.

In January 2022 traders at the market staged a two-day strike in protest against an increase in rental fees. The increase depended on the sector, ranging from 38% for meat vendors to 50% for Ndagala vendors. Rents for stores had risen by up to 85%. Travel agencies saw a 50% reduction.

In August 2023 traders at the Bujumbura City Market said that rents for most stalls had almost doubled. This was the second rent increase in 18 months. The market director said the increase was required due to inflation and tax increases, and because more money was needed for management and maintenance of the market.

Over the years the market had been enlarged, reorganized and made cleaner. A stall that was being discussed on social media was in a good location, measured 3 by 2.88 metres (9.8 ft × 9.4 ft) and could be shared by four tenants. Its rent had increased from 472,000 to 708,000 BIF. The new rental structure required traders to give a two-month deposit, which would be used when they terminated the contract with two months' notice.

== See also ==
- List of markets in Bujumbura

== Sources ==
- Burundi – proposition visant l’octroi d’un don de 500 000 dollars eu au titre de l’aide d’urgence destine au programme d’actions visant a attenuer les effets de l’incendie du marche central de Bujumbura (PDF) (in French), African Development Bank Group, 2013
- Gahimbare, Grace Divine (29 August 2023), "Bujumbura city market : Point de presse", Le Renouveau (in French)
- Habarugira, Bruce (28 January 2022), "Bujumbura City Market : Les commerçants dans le désarroi", Burundi Eco (in French)
- Harerimana, Egide (29 August 2023), "Bujumbura City Market : Des commerçants dans le désarroi après la hausse des loyers des stands", Iwacu (in French)
- Kuriyo, Benjamin (28 January 2020), "A quand la reconstruction du marché central de Bujumbura ?", Burundi Eco (in French)
- Manishatse, Lorraine Josiane (25 March 2020), "Business activities slows down at Bujumbura City Market following COVID-19 prevention measures", Iwacu
