= Port of Bujumbura =

Largest port on Lake Tanganyika

- Interactive map of Port of Bujumbura
- Location within Burundi

Location
- Country: Burundi
- Location: Bujumbura
- Coordinates: 3.377056°S 29.345802°E

Details
- Opened: 1959
- Operated by: Global Port Services Burundi (GPSB)
- Owned by: Burundi Maritime, Port and Railway Authority

The Port of Bujumbura is a port on Lake Tanganyika serving Bujumbura, the largest city in Burundi. It is the largest port on the lake and handles about 80% of Burundi's imports and exports. Constructed in 1959 and expanded in the early 1990s, the port includes berthing facilities, gantry cranes, warehouses, and an open storage area. The port is also used as a transit point for goods destined for Rwanda and the Democratic Republic of the Congo.

== Location ==
The Port of Bujumbura is the largest port on Lake Tanganyika, the others being Mpulungu (Zambia), Kalemie (Democratic Republic of the Congo), and Kigoma (Tanzania). Rumonge, to the south, has the only other large landing site in Burundi.

The port is northeast of the lake, north of the Boulevard du Port, west of the Avenue du Lac and RN5 Boulevard Melchior Ndadaye, and south of the Ntahangwa River. The Brarudi Brewery is to the northeast of the port. The Buyenzi Canal, a storm water canal, flows from the Buyenzi District into the port basin, carrying sediment and sand, domestic waste water, debris and factory waste. Regular dredging is required to remove sediment. There is an oil jetty and oil storage owned by SEP (Société d'Entreposage Pétrolier au Burundi) about 1 kilometre (0.62 mi) to the north of the port.

== Trade routes ==
Burundi depends on neighboring countries for access to the ocean:

- The northern corridor is 2,000 kilometres (1,200 mi) by road through Rwanda, Uganda and Kenya to the port of Mombasa on the Indian Ocean.
- The main route is the 1,400-kilometre (870 mi) central corridor through Tanzania. Goods are transported by lake between Bujumbura and Kigoma, and by road or rail between Kigoma and Dar es Salaam on the Indian Ocean.
- With the deep south route, goods are transported by lake between Bujumbura and Mpulungu in Zambia, then by road, or by road and rail, via Zimbabwe and South Africa to Durban on the Indian Ocean.
- The western route is by lake between Bujumbura and Kalemie, then by road and rail through the Democratic Republic of the Congo and Angola to Lobito on the Atlantic Ocean.

About 80% of Burundi's external trade is carried via the last three routes, using the Port of Bujumbura.

The port manages receipt and delivery of exports and imports, whether carried by ship or by truck. As of 2011 more than 90% of cargo handled was imports, of which about 60% entered by ship and 40% by truck. All imports were carried out of the port by truck. Exports are carried into the port by truck and taken away by ship or truck. The port also handles goods in transit to Rwanda and the Democratic Republic of Congo.

== Facilities ==
The outer harbor is a transition zone partially sheltered from the waves in which boats can wait or maneuver. The port basin is 450 by 100 metres (1,480 by 330 ft) and is used for loading and unloading cargo. In total, the port has 920m of quays, with a draught of 4 to 8 metres (13 to 26 ft). The north jetty is 330 metres (1,080 ft) long, of which 150 metres (490 ft) is used as an oil terminal. The south bank is 220 metres (720 ft) long, with several passenger ship berths, and is protected by the 120 metres (390 ft) south jetty.

There are four gantry cranes mounted on rails for general cargo, a fixed derrick and a mobile crane for containers and heavy loads, two front loaders for containers and ten forklifts. The port has an open storage space and warehouses that cover 18,560 square metres (199,800 sq ft).

Shipping on Lake Tanganyika is dominated by companies based in Burundi, including ARNOLAC, BATRALAC and RAD Marine. The port handles bagged cement, sugar, fertilizers etc., oil, motor vehicles, machinery and containers.

== History ==
The Port of Bujumbura was built in 1959, with capacity of 200,000 tons. In 1989–92 it was expanded to 500,000 tons. Until 1992 it was run as a parastatal. In 1992 it was leased for ten years to EPB (Société Concessionnaire de l'Exploitation du Port de Bujumbura), a public-private partnership owned 43% by the state and 57% private. The lease was later extended.

Presidential Decree No. 100/252 of 4 October 2011 established the Burundi Maritime, Port and Railway Authority (BMPRA) as owner, with the mandate of consolidating the port and enhancing private sector participation in port management and operations. The EBP concession ran to the end of 2012. Decree No100/311 of 27 November 2012 authorized the state of Burundi to take an ownership share in Global Port Services Burundi, a concessionary company to operate the Port of Bujumbura.

A project to renovate the Port of Bujumbura was officially launched on 17 August 2023 and was expected to take 24 months. The ceremony was attended by Marie Chantal Nijimbere, Minister of Trade, Transport, Industry and Tourism, and representatives of theEuropean Union and the African Development Bank. The cost of €79 million will be funded in part by the African Development Bank Group (€23.4 million), and the European Union (€29 million). The project involves acquiring port operations equipment, improving access roads and building staff capacity. The port should become a hub, linking the main roads leading to the interior of Burundi, and will improve trade with the other countries bordering Lake Tanganyika.

The port was damaged in 2023/2024 by floods that cause the waters of Lake Tanganyika to rise. This made hangars and offices unusable, and reduced the parking space for trucks. The oil jetty had been rehabilitated, but was submerged, and the pipelines had to be reinstalled. However, by May 2024 the modernization works were 98% complete and were to be received in October that year. A container terminal with capacity for about 400 containers was complete. There were plans to build a passenger quay.

== See also ==
- Transport in Burundi

== Sources ==
- Burundi Port of Bujumbura, Logistics Cluster
- Decret No100/127 du 07 Avril 2023 portant revision du decret No100/311 du 27 Novembre 2012 (PDF) (in French)
- Exploitation du Port de Bujumbura (EPB) (PDF), EPB
- "Ferry Terminal Port de Bujumbura", OpenStreetMap
- "Le port de Bujumbura, un point d'entrée stratégique", Burundi Eco (in French), 23 July 2021
- Maniragaba, Mélance (30 May 2024), "Vers la fin des travaux de modernisation du port de Bujumbura", Burundi Eco (in French)
- Port of Bujumbura will soon be renovated and modernized thanks to funding from the African Development Bank Group and the European Union, African Development Bank, 25 August 2023
- Shirambere, Méthode, Le Port de Bujumbura (PDF) (in French), EPB
- Study of Master Plan for Port Sector in the Republic of Burundi (PDF), Ministry of Transport, Public Works and Equipment, Japan International Cooperation Agency, September 2012
