= Global Port Services Burundi =

- Trade name: GPSB
- Industry: Transport
- Predecessor: EPB (Société Concessionnaire de l'Exploitation du Port de Bujumbura)
- Founded: 2012; 14 years ago
- Headquarters: Bujumbura, Burundi
- Global Port Services Burundi in Bujumbura (Burundi)
- Website: https://gpsbdi.com/en/

Global Port Services Burundi, or GPSB, is a public-private partnership that operates the Port of Bujumbura in Burundi. It was formed in 2012 to manage the port under a thirty-year concession.

== Background ==
The Port of Bujumbura was built in 1959. It manages receipt and delivery of exports and imports, whether carried by ship or by truck. As of 2011 more than 90% of cargo handled was imports, of which about 60% entered by ship and 40% by truck. All imports are carried out of the port by truck. Exports are carried into the port by truck and taken away by ship or truck.

In 1992 the port was leased for ten years to EPB (Société Concessionnaire de l'Exploitation du Port de Bujumbura), a public-private partnership owned 43% by the state and 57% private. The lease was later extended. The EBP concession ran to the end of 2012.

== History ==
Decree No100/311 of 27 November 2012 authorized the state of Burundi to take an ownership share in Global Port Services Burundi (GPSB), a concessionary company formed to manage the Port of Bujumbura. The management concession was for thirty years, with option to renew the contract for another 30 years.

In December 2014 GPSB dismissed over 70 employees for economic reasons.

GPSB handles import, export and transit goods. Before April 2016 trucks that passed through the port but were unloaded in private premises outside the port were weighed on entry to the port, then returned to be weighed after being unloaded, so the weight of goods could be calculated. In April 2016 GPSB introduced new handling charges that applied to these trucks. The containers were now being weighed before leaving the port so Customs could check against the weight recorded on the documents and decide whether or not to allow unloading outside the port. GPSB had to charge for use of the weighing machine.

In January 2023 GPSB began working 24 hours per day, seven days a week in order to reduce the time boats spent at the quayside waiting to be unloaded. It was hoped that this would increase lake traffic.

A joint commission was set up to examine the ownership of Global Port Services Burundi in October 2021. Based on its recommendations, on 15 March 2023 the Council of Ministers proposed a draft decree, retroactive to 14 December 2012, under which the state's shareholding in Global Port Services Burundi would be 64.21%, or over 1.7 billion BIF. The decree was signed by Evariste Ndayishimiye, President of Burundi, on 7 April 2023. The commission also recommended an inquiry into how 18 boats transferred from the Kingdom of Belgium to Burundi had been acquired by ARNOLAC.

== See also ==
- List of companies of Burundi
- Economy of Burundi

== Sources ==
- "70 employés envoyés au chômage au port de Bujumbura", Radio Publique Africaine (in French), 22 December 2014
- Decret No100/127 du 07 Avril 2023 portant revision du decret No100/311 du 27 Novembre 2012 (PDF) (in French)
- Exploitation du Port de Bujumbura (EPB) (PDF), EPB
- Inland Waterways, Northern Corridor Transit and Transport Coordination Authority (NCTTCA)
- Maniragaba, Mélance (10 February 2023), "Le nombre de rotations des bateaux augmenté au port de Bujumbura", Burundi Eco (in French)
- Ngendakumana, Philippe (12 May 2016), "Port de Bujumbura/ GPSB-Déclarants : Le torchon brûle", Iwacu (in French)
- Niyongabo, Jean Marie Vianney (21 March 2023), "Global Port Services Burundi : L'actionnariat de l'Etat représente plus de 64%", Burundi Eco (in French)
- Study of Master Plan for Port Sector in the Republic of Burundi (PDF), Ministry of Transport, Public Works and Equipment, Japan International Cooperation Agency, September 2012
