= Compagnie des Grands Lacs =

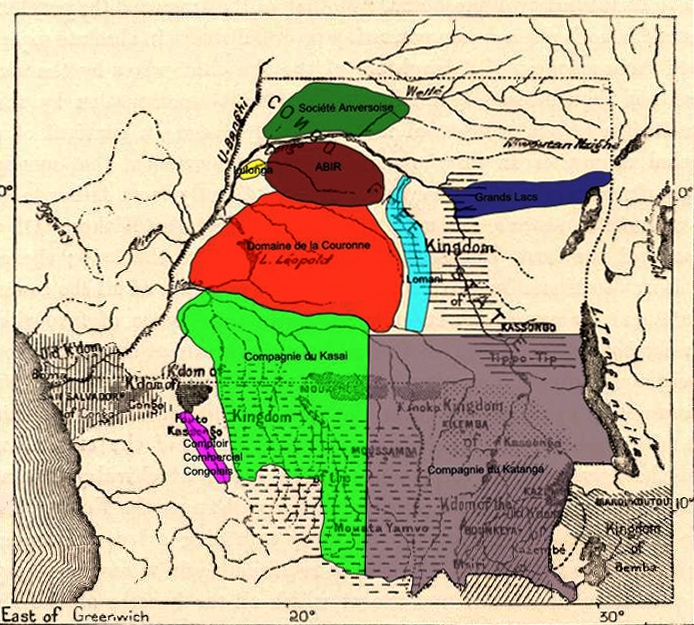
Congo Free State concession companies, Grands Lacs Company shown in dark blue

The Grands Lacs Company was a concession company of the Congo Free State.

== Bibliography ==
- Harms, Robert (1975), "The End of Red Rubber: A Reassessment", The Journal of African History, 16 (1): 73–88, doi:10.1017/S0021853700014110, JSTOR 181099
