= Kamenge Market =

Public market in Burundi

- Market
- {{{other_names}}}
- Marché de Kamenge
- Location within Burundi
- Coordinates: 3.346598°S 29.38267°E

The Kamenge Market (French: Marché de Kamenge) is a public market in Bujumbura, Burundi.

== Events and issues ==
The Kamenge market was burned down in 2012. A new one was built. On 9 February 2014, torrential rains fell in the northern parts of Bujumbura. The market was flooded, and many of the kiosks were washed away, with only mud remaining. Most of the traders had previously worked at Bujumbura Central Market before it was wrecked by a fire. The rain also cut water and power lines.

In July 2015, it was reported that, following disturbances related to President Pierre Nkurunziza's decision to run for a third term, security was tight at the market, with everyone checked for weapons at the entrance.

On 3 October 2020, there was another large fire at Kamenge market. Radio Publique Africaine reported that, following the fire, traders were concerned that management of the market was to be transferred to the businessman Vénérand Kazohera. Kazohera had donated a large amount of money towards the reconstruction, and had bought land very near the market. He was associated with the ruling CNDD-FDD party, whose president, Benjamin Ndagijimana, had tried to persuade the traders to temporarily move to Kinama, despite having no official role in the reconstruction.

The market was officially reopened on 27 November 2021 by Evariste Ndayishimiye, President of Burundi. It had a capacity of around 3,000 stalls. By 6 December 2021, a few stalls were occupied. Some of the owners of places were rebuilding their stands using bricks or metal sheets, but were not allowed to use wood. There had been some problems with reallocation of spaces. The new market has large emergency routes, and better after-hours security. There is a car park and premises for a counter of the Commercial Bank of Burundi (BANCOBU) and perhaps other banks or microfinance branches. There are toilets and permanent electricity and running water.

In December 2021, a mall owned by a private investor was being built to the northeast of the market, with some buildings nearly ready to open. Wholesalers would import goods to the mall and store them there. Possibly some of the market's traders would be able to buy goods there.

In July 2024, there were reports that security officers were demanding payment of fines from traders who they claimed had not locked both padlocks on their stalls. The Kamenge market commissioner said he had heard about this, but nobody had complained. He said there were no such fines.

== See also ==
- List of markets in Bujumbura

== Sources ==
- "Check-in au marché de Kamenge", Isanganiro (in French), 27 July 2015
- Habarugira, Bruce (3 December 2021), "Réouverture du marché de Kamenge : La construction des échoppes en cours", Burundi Eco (in French)
- Harerimana, Egide (7 December 2021), "Marché de Kamenge : Reprise des activités malgré les difficultés", Iwacu (in French)
- "Le marché de Kamenge en passe d'être attribué à certains ténors du parti Cndd-Fdd ?", Radio Publique Africaine (in French), 20 October 2020
- "Le nouveau marché de Kamenge offre plus de facilités à ses usagers", ABP (in French), 5 January 2022
- "Marché de Kamenge engorgé de boue, les commerçants appellent au secours", Igihe (in French), 12 February 2014
- Ndayishimiye, Alexandrine (24 July 2024), "Kamenge : Quand les chargés de la sécurité du marché deviennent des profiteurs", Iwacu (in French)
