= Livingstone–Stanley Monument =

Monument in Burundi

Coordinates: 3°28′55.8″S 29°21′8.5″E

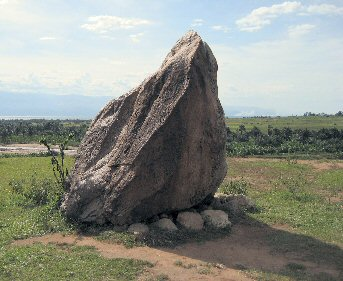
The stone monument at Mugere, south of Bujumbura

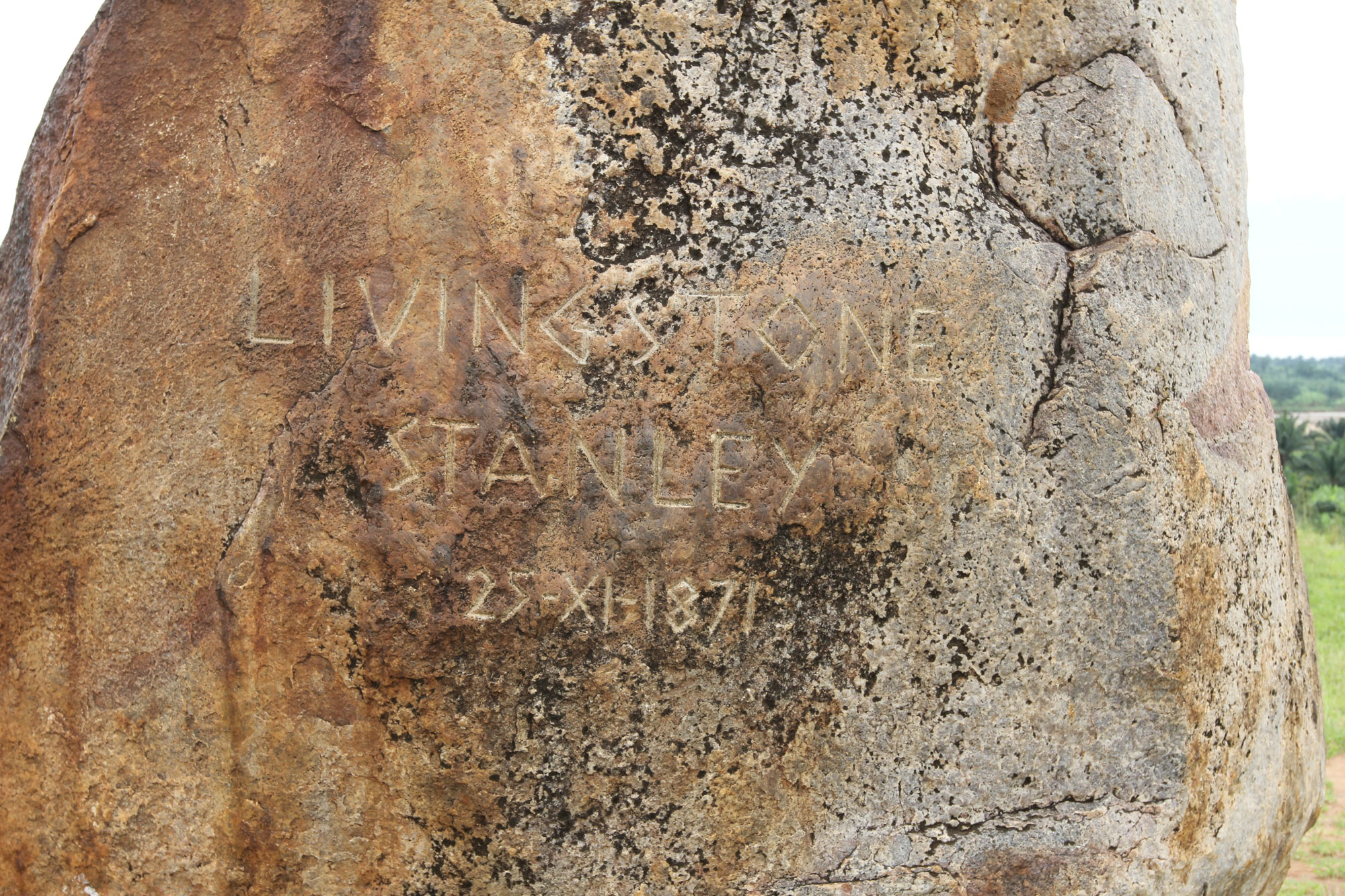
Monument engraving

The Livingstone–Stanley Monument at Mugere marks a location where explorer and missionary Dr David Livingstone and journalist and explorer Henry Morton Stanley visited and spent two nights on 25–27 November 1871 in Burundi. It is 12 km south of the largest city and former capital Bujumbura, overlooking Lake Tanganyika. In French, it is referred to as La Pierre de Livingstone et Stanley. Some Burundians claim the location is where the famous first meeting of Livingstone and Stanley took place, at which the latter uttered the famous words "Dr Livingstone, I presume?".

However, that meeting actually took place in Ujiji in Tanzania on 10 November 1871 as clearly detailed in Stanley's book, "How I Found Livingstone". David Livingstone's journal also confirms Ujiji as the location, with an entry the day before the meeting reading "At dawn, off and go to Ujiji", a town he knew well. Livingstone then details meetings with several Arab residents of Ujiji including one who was supposed to be keeping his goods from his previous visit, before recording Stanley's arrival.

From their writings, the visit to Mugere appears to be the one on 25–27 November which Livingstone and Stanley described as being one of the most hospitable they enjoyed. The date 25 November 1871 can be seen scratched on the rock. They had rested in Ujiji for six days, and then set off by canoe up the north-east shore of the lake to explore rivers which might flow out of the Lake Tanganyika. At the Mugere River they found the village of Chief Mukamba who welcomed them and gave them a hut in which to rest. They stayed two nights, and Stanley records that Livingstone's servant Susi got very drunk on the Chief's hospitality. As the first Europeans to visit the area, their arrival was memorable, and it must be at some time later the event became confused in some people's minds as the first meeting between Livingstone and Stanley. A number of websites make this wrong claim.

== See also ==
- David Livingstone
- Livingstone Memorial
