= BATRALAC =

Company operating cargo boats on Lake Tanganyika

Bateau de transport sur lac
- Trade name: BATRALAC
- Industry: Transport
- Founded: 1988; 38 years ago
- Headquarters: Bujumbura, Burundi
- Global Port Services Burundi in Bujumbura (Burundi)

Bateau de transport sur lac (Lake Transport Boat: BATRALAC), is a private company that operates cargo boats on Lake Tanganyika. It is based in the Port of Bujumbura in Burundi. Founded in 1988, the Greek-owned company operates a fleet of cargo ships including the Tora, Rwegura, and Teza.

== History ==
Batralac has Greek ownership. It acquired the 1,110 ton Tora in 1988, the 500 ton Rwegura in 1984 and the 1,500 ton Teza in 2002. As of 1990 BATRALAC, SOTRALAC and Tanganyika Transport were competitors of ARNOLAC, the largest merchant shipping company in Burundi.

During the Burundian Civil War, on 25 May 1997 FDD rebels led by former interior minister Léonard Nyangoma captured Batralac's Rwegera cargo ship and took it south to Moba in Zaire, which was still in the hands of the Forces Armées Zaïroises.

In 2005 the three Batralac ships visited Mpulungu in Zambia, at the south end of the lake, once a month. They travelled together. Products transported from Zambia were cement, reinforcing bars, sugar and maize. The ships carried food and cement trom the port of Kigoma in Tanzania.

There was a political crisis in 2015 when Burundian president Pierre Nkurunziza decided to run for a third term. The combined volumes carried by ARNOLAC and BATRALAC fell to 2,000 tonnes per month.

In 2024, shipping on Lake Tanganyika was dominated by companies based in Burundi, including ARNOLAC, BATRALAC and RAD Marine.

== MV Teza ==
MV Teza went into service in August 2002. It is a full container ship that can load 40 twenty-foot equivalent unit (TEU) shipping containers, 26 in the hold and 14 on deck. As of 2012 it had not loaded containers for several years. It can also carry 1500 tonnes of bulk cargo. It has a crew of 16. It was the largest vessel in service in the Port of Bujumbura in 2012.

MV Teza was designed by Chris Simopoulos & Associates of Greece, and built by Batralac in a project managed by Basil Demeris. The ship is 60 by 11 metres (197 by 36 ft). The steel hull is 6 to 12 millimetres (0.24 to 0.47 in) thick and has a moulded depth of 4.5 metres (15 ft) It carries up to 77,000 litres (17,000 imp gal; 20,000 US gal) of fuel and is powered by two Cummins KT19 marine diesels, each rated 425 HP at 1800 RPM, which drive 450 millimetres (18 in) diameter propellers. Cruising speed is 11 knots. Two 37kW Moëës CUST370-4M generators powered by Cummins 4B engines supply electricity.

== Fleet ==
As of 2012 the BATRALAC fleet was:

Name of Vessel	Type of Vessel	Length Overall (m)	Width (m)	Dead Weight (ton)	Draft in Charge (m)	State	In-service Year
Tora	Bulk Cargo Ship	58.00	10.00	1,110	3.50	G	1988
Rwegura	Bulk Cargo Ship	45.00	8.00	500	2.50	G.E	1984
Teza	Mixed Cargo Ship	60.00	11.00	1,500	3.60	V.G	1992

State: V.G = Very Good / G = Good / G.E = Good Enough

== See also ==
- List of companies of Burundi
- Economy of Burundi

== Sources ==
- Abuse of dominance in regulated sectors: Case submitted by Zambia, OECD, 14 January 2005
- "Across the lake", Africa Confidential, 11 April 1997
- Burundi Port of Bujumbura, Logistics Cluster
- "New Cargo Ship for Lake Tanganyika Launched In Burundi", MarineLink, 19 September 2002
- Ngendakumana, Philippe (30 July 2015), "Transport international : malaise sur le Tanganyika", Iwacu (in French)
- Sirven, Pierre (May 1991), "Les transports sur le lac Tanganyika. In: L'eau et l'aménagement", l’Afrique des grands lacs. (in French), Colloque de Bujumbura – via Talence : Centre de recherche sur les espaces tropicaux, 1993. pp. 281-308
- Study of Master Plan for Port Sector in the Republic of Burundi (PDF), Ministry of Transport, Public Works and Equipment, Japan International Cooperation Agency, September 2012
