= Commune of Kinama =

Coordinates: 3.3833°S 29.3667°E

Commune of Ngagara Commune Ngagara
- Commune
- Ngagara
- Nickname: Kin
- Interactive map of Commune of Ngagara
- Country: Burundi
- Province: Bujumbura
- Administrative center: Ngagara

Area
  - Total: 3.9 sq mi (10 km^{2})

Population (2019)
  - Total: 70,000
- Time zone: UTC+2 (Central Africa Time)

The commune of Ngagara is a commune of Bujumbura in northwest Burundi. The capital is at Ngagara, Bujumbura.
