= Commune of Buyenzi =

Commune of Bujumbura Maire Province, Burundi

Buyenzi Wilaya ya Buyenzi (Swahili)
- Commune
- Commune Buyenzi
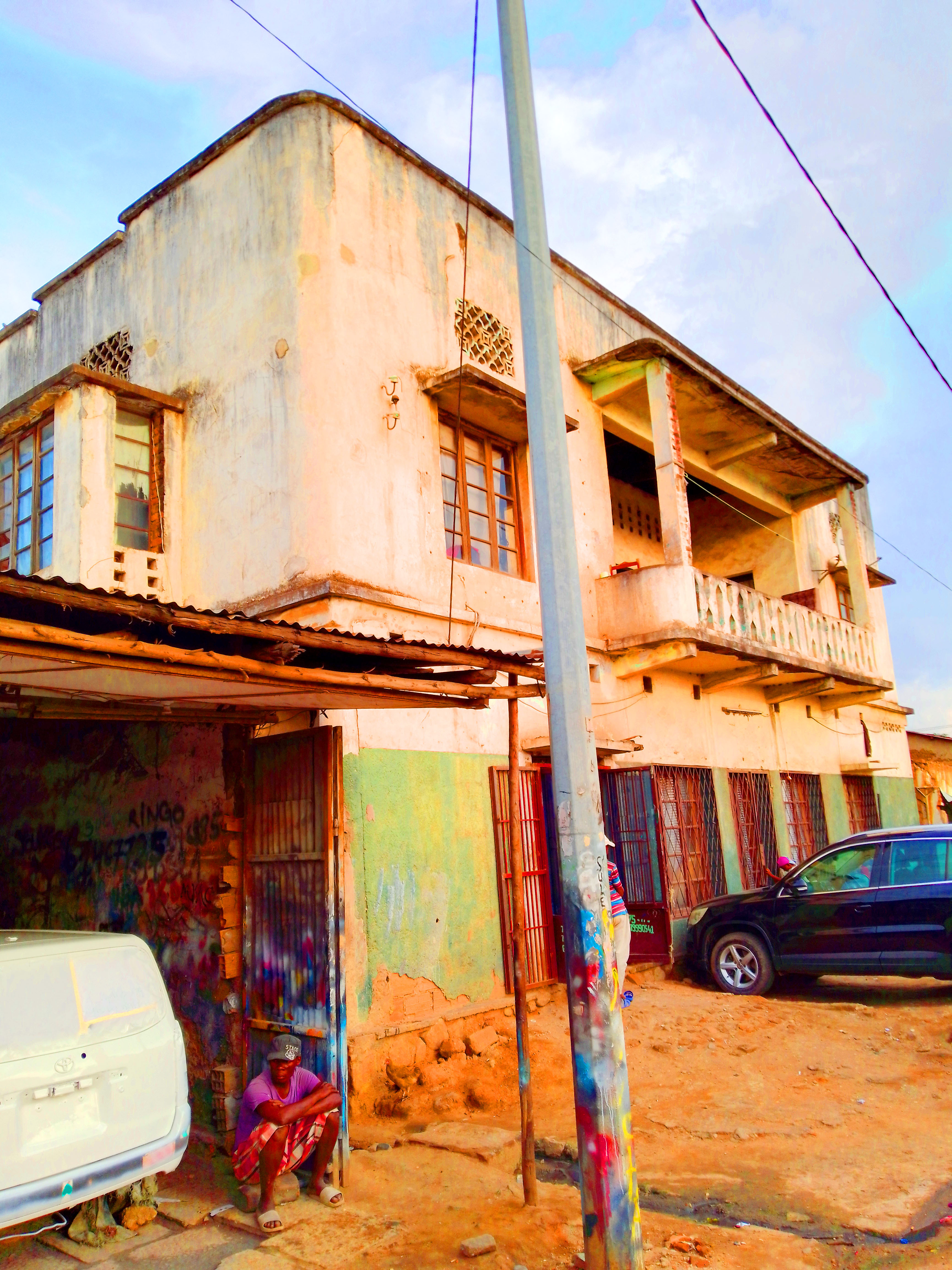
- Building in Buyenzi
- Nickname: The Swahili Quarter
- Location within Burundi
- Coordinates: 3°22′8.4″S 29°21′32.4″E
- Country: Burundi
- Province: Bujumbura Mairie Province
- Administrative center: Buyenzi
- Time zone: UTC+2 (Central Africa Time)

The commune of Buyenzi ( Wilaya ya Buyenzi, in Swahili) is a historic commune (District) of Bujumbura Mairie Province in western Burundi. The district is known for its Swahili heritage and influence not just in Bujumbura but Burundi as a whole. Buyenzi communie is laid on a grid plan and has 25 horizontal numbered streets.

== History ==
Following the 1830s, commercial relations between the Lake Tanganyika region and the Swahili traders of the Indian Ocean grew more intense, and Ujiji, located at the western end of one of the main overland caravan routes, quickly gained significance. Through ordinary daily interactions between traders and the local populace, Lake Tanganyika gradually developed into a "second Swahili coast," adopting many of the distinctive Swahili traits, such as the Swahili language, Islamic architecture and attire, and Islam itself.

As the first Swahili settlement for the specific neighborhood, Buyenzi is home to the majority of Burundian Muslims who are mostly descendants of Swahili merchants from the Swahili Coast in the early 19th Century. Masjid Al Jummaa of Buyenzi, located on 12th and 13th streets of Buyenzi, is the second-largest mosque in Burundi and reflects the Swahili Islamic heritage.

Due to caravan trade networks from the East African coast into the interior, the Swahili language had historically been spoken around the beaches of Lake Tanganyika since the second half of the 19th century. The German colonial authorities, who encouraged the spread of Kiswahili in Tanganyika, the hub of German East Africa, particularly in the early 20th century, instrumentalized the language as a counterforce against the spread of English, however, were responsible for the language's initial widespread introduction.

When examining a dispute that occurred in 1902 at the Reichskolonialamt, it also becomes clear that Kiswahili was widely used and taught in the German colony (such as in the German school in Gitega). The disagreement was about funding for a Kirundi dictionary, which was suggested by the Catholic missionary van der Burg but rejected by the German governor Graf von Götzen, who suggested Kiswahili instead because it was more widely spoken. Germans "became so enamored with Kiswahili that they even imagined transplanting it to Cameroon" during the colonial era because it was perceived as a bulwark against English, the main colonial language.

Kiswahili was never widely adopted (or diffused) in Burundi as it was under the German occupation of Tanganyika. The first school in Usumbura (today's Bujumbura) was established in 1909 by the German Residentur, who chose Kiswahili as the medium of teaching because it was the only official language in Ruanda-Urundi. The result was that, "the Swahili language, supplemented by the defining characteristics of the Swahili culture, was instituted in Bujumbura and all its inhabitants spoke the language as a lingua franca".

Kiswahili has continued to be used in Bujumbura, but its standing and renown have altered throughout time. According to Belt, who emphasizes that initially it used to be the language that united people from different backgrounds but later changed into the language of strangers, Muslims, and "uncivilized" people, the language was not only spoken by various groups but also associated with various linguistic ideologies and inherent attitudes.

=== Persecution ===
Belgium was handed the mandate over Ruanda-Urundi after the First World War, when Germany was defeated. The main reason they first upheld the German linguistic policy was that Swahili was also spoken in the Belgian Congo along the coast of Lake Tanganyika. It was unfathomable to be unable to communicate in Swahili, but throughout time, numerous new regulations came into effect, affecting Bujumbura's residents' social, economic, and linguistic circumstances significantly. Bujumbura grew more stratified as the Belgians attempted to create distinct economic and physical sectors for the various racial groups. Boundaries were also set within the town, just as they had been between rural and urban areas.

Due to their link with Islam, Kiswahili speakers were eventually marginalized by Belgian authorities because Swahili had been used as an ideological tool during German administration. In order to clearly implement a strategy of strategic stratification, new boundaries were erected between Muslim and non-Muslim groups as well as between urban and rural ones. The Kirundi-speaking majority was preferred, while the Muslim and Swahili minorities were meant to be driven out of the city.

People who spoke Kiswahili were forced by the Belgians to pay higher taxes, and starting in 1927, Kirundi was the sole language taught in schools. The Swahili group was hit harder by the educational reforms implemented in 1927, which saw the Catholic Church assume almost all of the duties associated with education and change the language of instruction from Latin to Kirundi in primary schools and French in higher education. Muslims who refused to convert to Christianity were denied access to education and the skills that the European government and businesses required. This also applied to the teaching of artisanal skills.Therefore, professions which could be learned without formal instruction became increasingly common among the Muslim community.

A separate residential area was created aside for non-Muslim Africans who had full-time, salaried jobs in order to "control" the African population. The majority of Swahilis were not permitted to dwell there because of their diverse range of jobs. When Asians [and Arabs] effectively drove the later-arrived, less-affluent Swahilis out of the Asian commune (Matongoni) and into a nearby neighborhood known as Kabondo, the stratification grew even tougher.

=== Buyenzi as a district for the Swahili in the 1930s ===
By the end of the 1920s, the divisions within Bujumbura's population and the communes allocated to them were firmly drawn: Europeans, Asians, Swahilis, and other Africans, each group with its own neighbourhood, each with appropriate occupations'. This separation between Catholic and Muslim Africans was emphasized by their growing geographic separation.

Midway through the 1930s, two additional communes were founded. One was Buyenzi, the village des Swahilis created for the Swahilis who were relocated from Kabondo, Mbugani, or Matongoni. Most of the residents were probably born, married, and passed away in the area. The other community, Belge, was located nearer the town's center and its residents were either Christians or traditionalists. They were frequently young men who had gone to Bujumbura in search of employment, got married, and then frequently never brought their wives and kids back to Bujumbura.

They typically spoke French and had stable employment in a respectable position that they had been able to obtain as a result of attending a mission school. In contrast, those in Buyenzi frequently lacked proper training, frequently changed positions, and were no longer the "right hand" of the government. The new stratification policy of the Belgian government had the result that "Islam no longer exercised the attraction to immigrants it once did." Those who had just arrived in Bujumbura now had access to a sizable, largely stable group of Africans who were not yet converted to Christianity.

Consequently, even though there were three times as many Muslims as non-Muslims in Bujumbura in the 1930s, they were no longer the majority by 1948. Swahilis were no longer the center of the African community in Bujumbura. In response, the Swahilis regrouped various nations and ethnic groups, including the Congolese, Ugandans, Rwandans, Rundis, Tanganyika residents, and Arab-Swahilis, to build an increasingly cohesive community. They were united by occupation, religion, language, and place of residence, which were four factors. Swahili evolved into a way of identifying oneself with others who did not speak the language as well as a medium of communication. Islam introduced them to a social structure and cultural framework that isolated them from the rest of society.

=== Buyenzi in the 1950s ===
The Swahilis in Bujumbura lived pretty well even without occupations in the colonial government, better than the Rwandans and the Rundi. The slurs between the two groups were more frequent as a result. The Swahilis were successful in business, but this success was sometimes attributed to unlawful trade and thievery rather than to their astute economic judgment and open minds. The Swahili people began to develop a bad reputation, which eventually led to the name "Swahili" being used to refer to thugs, liars, thieves, and generally dishonest people.

Since 1950, it has been illegal to enter into new polygamous unions, which has led to an increase in the number of unmarried Swahili women. The government mistook these ladies for still being in their unlawful marriages or prostitutes and did not think they were truly unmarried. The large taxes imposed on unmarried women as a result were known as "kodi ya malaya" (tax on prostitutes) by the Swahili clerks.

Africans also developed divides and distinctions amongst the various groups in Bujumbura, not just the Belgian authority did. At elections, they began to organize themselves along ethnic lines, which fueled tensions between different ethnic groups and regions. They also started to form associations along ethnic lines. In Buyenzi, the only officially recognized associations were those that derived their membership from the Muslim African population as a whole. By contrast, ethnic associations flourished in Belge.

Bujumbura resembled a massive formation of layered rock towards the end of the 1950s, with strata made up of "people of various occupations and national origins." This mixture also had order and logic, with certain groups dominating particular activities. This arrangement was the result of the recruitment practices that were used to fill the colonial political economy's shifting requirements. lingual views were also mirrored in these strata. The new Francophones believed that Swahili was a language spoken by criminals and robbers as well as the uncultured and ignorant. As a result, Swahili was positioned behind French and Kirundi in the linguistic hierarchy.

For a while, it appeared that the Swahili community had seen some type of revival when the country attained independence. 1955 saw demonstrations by women in Buyenzi over sexism and high taxes. Their complaints turned into overt opposition to paying taxes, and in 1956 they petitioned. In 1957, the male residents of the Swahili communes took control of the protests. These Swahili men's and women's actions were the first indications of political opposition to the colonial government and, as such, were a symbolic step towards Burundi's independence.

=== Buyenzi's role in Burudian Independence ===
Prince Louis Rwagasore, the leader of UPRONA and the son of Urundi's mwami (king), Mwambutsa, was well-liked in Buyenzi. Knowing that the Belgian officials disapproved of his activities, the Swahilis encouraged him to continue them and were enthusiastic about working for him. Swahilis were not actively and gradually eliminated; rather, they were at the very center of Rwagasore's cooperative. They want independence, a reduction in the high taxes, opportunities in Rundi society, the ability to engage in commercial activity, and the freedom to travel to the countryside because they were frustrated. UPRONA received a lot of support from the Swahili.

Other Swahili speakers, such as those in Tanzania and Kenya, are vying for independence. They held meetings and assisted with propaganda and upcountry mobilization in Burundi. They have an open mind despite their lack of education. Their flexibility, which is a result of their intermediary status on the outside of Burundian life, shown that they could transport not just people and products but also ideas.

However, the Belgians cautioned the Rundi about the Swahilis, claiming that if they gained control, the Swahilis would repress them and eradicate the Rundi culture. Due to the fact that they were not "nationals," it was specified in a statute that the majority of Swahilis could not vote or be elected. However, there was another reason why Swahilis were unable to be elected: they lacked the education required to serve as a minister or deputy, even though some may attain political rights based on Rundi ancestry.The Swahilis saw a complete return to the status quo upon their independence in 1962 for this precise reason.

After Congo gained its independence in 1960, the majority of the Congolese left, and the Rundi filled their posts in the government. Due to their inadequate education, the Swahilis reverted to the unorganized economy. The Muslims in Burundi eventually made the decision to publicly withdraw from social and political life by establishing their own educational system of Qur'an schools.

=== Buyenzi after Independence ===
Although they also spoke French, the colonial administration in Belgian Africa gave the natives' African languages advantages. After independence, however, this completely altered, with French taking over as the most significant language and Kirundi being demoted. Despite losing its importance, Swahili was still used in Bujumbura, particularly in commercial districts. The Swahilis had little sociological or political opposition in the early years of independence. After all, the Swahilis were instrumental in achieving freedom. Even the Catholic Church defended Swahili, claiming that since it was spoken by Burundi's neighbors, Swahili could be used as a second language for Africans, albeit this did not actually happen for practical and emotional reasons.

Insufficient teachers were available in the first place, and the administration had no interest in helping. Swahili was not the language of authority or power; it was French. Swahili was still disliked by certain people who still considered it as the language of the uneducated and illiterate. Others recalled the injustices and persecution they had experienced under Belgian authority.

Congolese officials who were in charge of maintaining order and performing duties were strict, which made them despise Swahili. Due to the large number of Congolese who had left for their homeland and the influx of Rundi into Bujumbura ten years after independence, Swahili was even less common in Bujumbura and Kirundi had replaced it as the dominant language.

The hard work of the Swahilis after independence led to the reintroduction of the Swahili language on the radio in 1961, despite the fact that Swahili and its speakers were still suppressed. The Swahilis were happy, but the Rundi were not won over by the language. Nevertheless, throughout time, situations for Swahili and its speakers gradually improved. Karangwa portrayed Burundi as a monolingual nation in 1995, with bilingualism prevalent among Bujumbura residents and Swahili ranking second to Kirundi, ahead of French and English.

=== Buyenzi during the Burundian Civil War ===
Contrary to expectations, Swahili usage and knowledge have expanded in Burundi as a result of the recent wars and following upheavals. This is mostly due to the fact that refugees who fled to nearby nations picked up Swahili in the process. In the refugee camps, the language is extensively spoken, especially by youngsters. These refugees are now returning and still speak Swahili. The new government in Burundi is also mostly composed of former refugees, rebel members, many of whom came from outside the country, and Swahili-fluent individuals who lived in Swahili-speaking nations throughout the war. They have a stronger preference for the promotion of Swahili in Burundi, and as a result, many politicians today speak the language.

== Buyenzi in the 2020s ==
Bunyezi's impact is finally geeting the recognition it deserved. Many modern politicians are Muslim and speak Swahili, including Dr. Yves Sahinguvu, first vice president, Sadi Kibeya, minister of education and scientific research, and Hafsa Mossi, minister of information, communication, relations with parliament, and government spokesman. For the first time in Burundian history, Islam was treated as an essential component of society rather than as an outcast or repulsive force. However, there are also concerns regarding the situation of Muslims in Burundi in the future since it appears that the period of tolerance is already coming to an end.

Both Kiswahili and English have been taught in Burundian elementary schools since the academic year 2005/2006, also as a move to strengthen political ties with other members of the East African Community. In Burundi now, only French, Kirundi, and English are recognized as official languages; Kiswahili is nevertheless a widely spoken but unofficial language.
