= Bujumbura Central Market =

Bujumbura Central Market Marché central de Bujumbura
- Market
- Location within Burundi
- Coordinates: 3.38490°S 29.36576°E

The Bujumbura Central Market (French: Marché central de Bujumbura) was a public market in the center of Bujumbura, Burundi. It burned down in January 2013, and the site was abandoned.

== History ==
The Bujumbura Central Market was built in 1994 on a site covering about 3 hectares (7.4 acres). The building was erected in 1994 at a cost equivalent to US$3.8 million in 2013 dollars. Funding was provided by the Coopération Française. The Société de Gestion du Marché Central de Bujumbura (SOGEMAC) was given a 30-year contract to manage it.

The central market was the main source of supplies for other markets in Bujumbura and in the interior of Burundi, and the main place where agricultural products from the rural areas were sold. It received produce from Cibitoke, Bubanza, Kayanza, Ngozi, Gitega and Rumonge, which in turn were supplied from their surrounding areas. It was a wholesale market for different kinds of cassava chips and flour.

The central market had 3,500 places, but more than 7,000 traders worked there, 90% of whom were women. About thirty traders had insurance, as requested by their banks. The daily value of goods sold was about US$2.8 million.

== Fire ==
A fire broke out early in the morning of 27 January 2013. Some traders, or looters, managed to recover goods. All the fire trucks assigned to Bujumbura Mairie had broken down. Firefighters arrived around 8 am, and the first water hose began operating around 9 am, but the fire could not be controlled and the firefighters concentrated on trying to prevent it from spreading. A helicopter was sent from Rwanda, but did not arrive until six hours after the fire started.

== Aftermath ==
At the macroeconomic level, the effect of the fire included food price increases, loss of value of the Burundian franc, losses to financial institutions, and a drop of tax revenues. Food products such as beans, rice and palm oil rose in price by up to 20%. The Burundian franc dropped by over 12% in two weeks due to increased demand for hard currency for imports to compensate for the goods that had been lost. Banks and microfinance institutions faced unpaid debt from traders. The state treasury and the province of Bujumbura Mairie lost tax revenues of about 50 to 60 million BIF per month.

The government decided to build a temporary market in the Ngagara II zone on an empty lot near the former COTEBU, but there were delays in starting construction due to lack of funds. When the Ngagara II Market was opened, it was cramped, poorly built and inconveniently located, and never became profitable. Traders moved to the Jabe Market, Ruvumera Market and Bujumbura City Market, which flourished as a result. The COTEBU Market was unsuccessful compared to Bujumbura City Market and Kamenge Market.

In October 2016 the government published a plan to build a new mall in place of the old market, but no bids were received by the deadline from construction companies. A Chinese company was selected to undertake construction, but the project did not move forward. In mid-2021 a roadmap was adopted by the Council of Ministers for a 5-level shopping center with underground and surface parking for 400 to 500 vehicles, and halls for conferences, concerts and exhibition. The foundation stone was to be laid in April 2023 and the center was to open in April 2026.

On 31 January 2024 Dieudonné Dukundane, Minister of Infrastructure, Equipment and Social Housing, outlined a plan through which private investors would contribute to building a new market. In February 2024 the site was still abandoned. It had not been cleared of abandoned goods, and the damaged buildings had not been demolished. Grass and trees had taken over the site. The offices of SOGEMAC, which had managed the market, had become a jail and a place where people who had missed their bus home could spend the night.

== See also ==
- List of markets in Bujumbura

== Sources ==
- Burundi – proposition visant l’octroi d’un don de 500 000 dollars eu au titre de l’aide d’urgence destine au programme d’actions visant a attenuer les effets de l’incendie du marche central de Bujumbura (PDF) (in French), African Development Bank Group, 2013
- Chemonics International Inc. (July 2010), Staple foods value chain analysis country report - Burundi (PDF), USAID, archived from the original (PDF) on February 20, 2017
- Kaburungu, Stanislas; Misago, Jeremie (3 February 2024), "Marché central de Bujumbura : 11 ans après, le joyau est devenu une jungle", Iwacu (in French)
- Kuriyo, Benjamin (28 January 2020), "A quand la reconstruction du marché central de Bujumbura ?", Burundi Eco (in French)
