= Mukaza (commune) =

Commune of Mukaza
- Commune
- Interactive map of Commune of Mukaza
- Coordinates: 3°23′12″S 29°21′34″E
- Country: Burundi

Area
  - Total: 20 km^{2} (7.7 sq mi)

Population
  - Total: 306,000
  - Density: 15,000/km^{2} (40,000/sq mi)
- Time zone: UTC+2 (Central Africa Time)

Mukaza is a commune of Bujumbura Mairie Province in Burundi.

== See also ==
- Communes of Burundi
