= Ruvumera Market =

Ruvumera market
- Market
- {{{other_names}}}
- Marché de Ruvumera
- Location within Burundi
- Coordinates: 3.3730698°S 29.354961°E

The Ruvumera Market (French: Marché de Ruvumera) is a public market in the Commune of Buyenzi, Bujumbura, Burundi.

== Events and issues ==
In July 2017 Pascal Barandagiye, Minister of the Interior, said the government planned to take over management of markets still run by private individuals. He noted that the Ruvumera market now paid three times more to Bujumbura Mairie than it had when private. The European Union provided funds to renovate seven markets in Bujumbura, which reopened on 30 May 2018. In the interim, some traders moved to the temporary Jade Market, but others chose to move permanently to Ruvumera market.

An October 2019 report said that the Ruvumera market no longer had spaces to hold waste, since kiosks had been erected on these spaces. Many of the nearby restaurants did not have toilets. The result was unsanitary conditions and risk of disease.

In March 2023 Bujumbura Mairie warned traders who had built stalls around the Ruvemera market that they had a deadline to demolish their stalls, after which the city would demolish them, charging the owners, but not returning the materials to the owners. The stall owners had been paying monthly rent to the city and an annual tax go the commune for years. The mayor said he was looking into the issue.

In July 2023 traders at the Ruvumera Market closed down in protest against the new rental prices of stands, which they considered exorbitant. Where the rents had before been collected by officials who passed very little to the state, they would now be collected in full by Burundian Revenue Office (OBR) in Bujumbura Mairie.

On 26 July 2023 the mayor of Bujumbura, Jimmy Hatungimana, led a raid on Ruvumera market to obtained rental contract signatures from the stand occupants. Standard rents would be paid in each part of the market for each stand. The OBR would collect the rents and pay 10% to the city hall as owner of the market, responsible for maintenance. When the rental contracts were renewed in June 2024 the fees were far more reasonable. A stand whose rent had been increased to 600,000 FBU per month now cost just 28,000 FBU per month (about US$10), still twice the rent paid before July 2023.

There was a fire at the market in May 2024, which caused a power outage. As of August 2024 the electricity had not been restored. Some generators had been set up to serve bank branches in the market, but they were not sufficient for the traders. Butchers had to move their refrigerators outside the market, and transport meat back and forward. Customers of clothing vendors could scarcely see the clothes to make a selection.

== See also ==
- List of markets in Bujumbura

== Sources ==
- Bujumbura : Les marchés rénovés cultiveront la concurrence (in French), CDE Great Lakes, 29 May 2018
- "De l'insalubrité au marché de Ruvumera", Radio Publique Africaine (in French), 28 October 2019
- Gahimbare, Grace Divine (26 July 2023), "Marché de Ruvumera : Lancement de la campagne de la nouvelle taxation des stands et shops", Le Renouveau (in French)
- Gateretse Devis (7 August 2024), "Sans électricité, les commerçants de Ruvumera broient du noir", Iwacu (in French)
- Gazika, Dorine (19 July 2017), Le Ministère de l’intérieur prend des stratégies pour augmenter les recettes communales (vidéo) (in French)
- Harerimana, Egide (12 April 2023), "Mukaza : Des commerçants opposés à la démolition des stands autour du marché de Ruvumera", Iawacu (in French)
- "Les commerçants du marché de Ruvumera grèvent contre les nouveaux tarifs des stands", Radio Publique Africaine (in French), 31 July 2023
- Les commerçants sont satisfaits des nouveaux prix de location des stands dans les marchés publics (in French), Office Burundais des Recettes
