= Mugere River =

River in Burundi

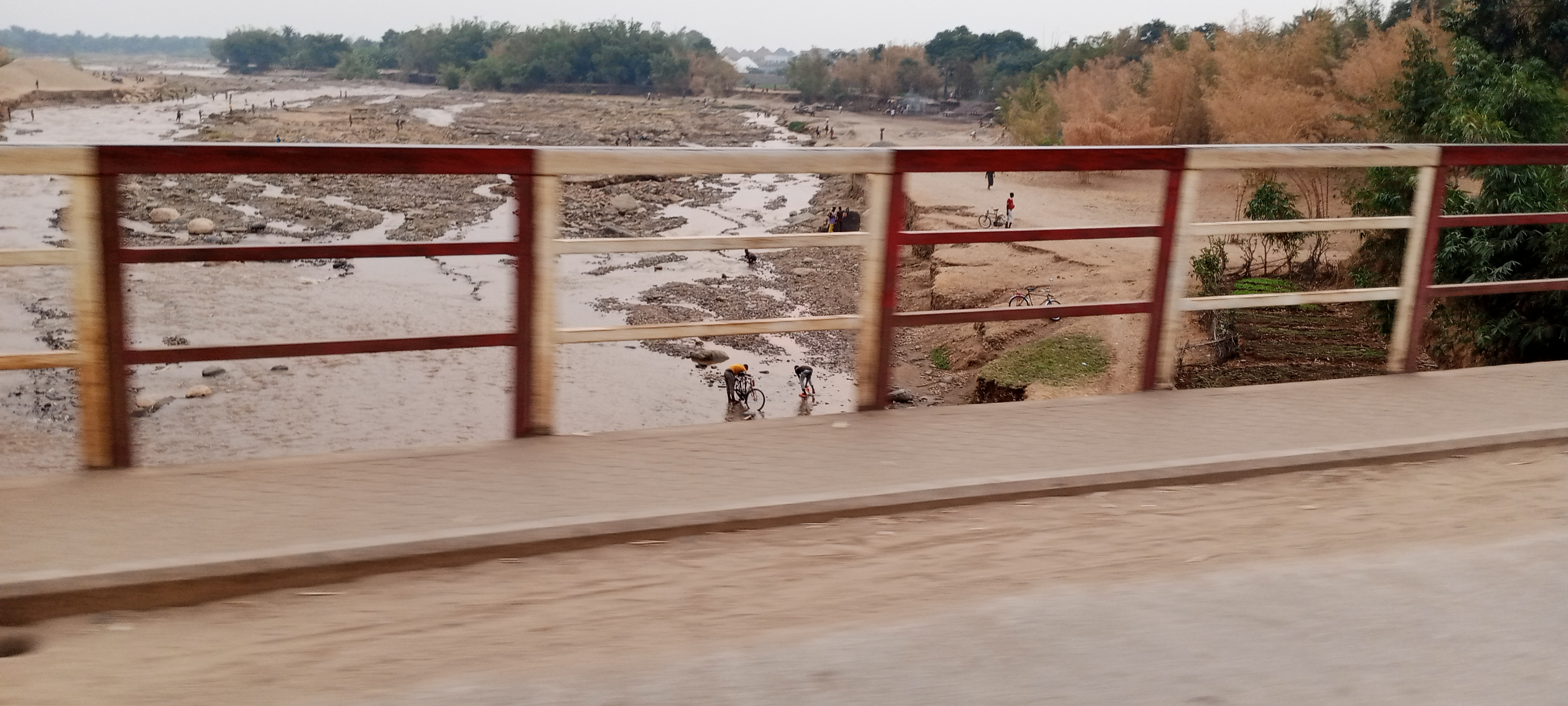

- Location within Burundi
- Native name: Rivière Mugere (French)

Location
- Country: Burundi
- Province: Bujumbura Rural Province

Physical characteristics
- Mouth
  - location: Lake Tanganyika
  - coordinates: 3.484126°S 29.33228°E

The Mugere River (French: Rivière Mugere) is a river in Bujumbura Rural Province, Burundi.

== Course ==
The river runs in a generally southeast - northwest direction from the southeast of the province, south of Mukike, to enter Lake Tanganyika south of Nyabugete. It flows to the lake from the Commune of Mukike through the Commune of Mutambu and the Commune of Kabezi.

The Mugere River rises to the west of the Kivumu colline and flows north past the heights of the Mukike colline before turning northwest and flowing past Mayuyu colline to the Mutobo colline. It is joined by the Nyamaruvya River from the left to the east of Gakara colline. It flows north-northwest to Rukingiro colline, where it is joined from the right by the Ngoma River. It continues west-northwest past the Nyarwedeka and Rubanda collines.

The Mugere is joined by the Mahangwe River from the right (north) before Nyankere colline, where there is an electric power station. It flows in a west-northwest direction, and is joined from the left (south) by the Nyarubenga at Nuamusenyi. It continues west under the RN3 highway and enters Lake Tanganyika through an area of marshland just north of Ramba. The Livingstone–Stanley Monument is near its mouth.

== Environment ==
The area around the Mugere River is densely populated, with 530 inhabitants per square kilometer as of 2016. The climate in the area is temperate. The average annual temperature is 20 °C (68 °F). The warmest month is July, when the average temperature is 24 °C (75 °F), and the coldest is November, with 16 °C (61 °F). Average annual rainfall is 1,304 millimetres (51.3 in). The rainiest month is December, with an average of 200 millimetres (7.9 in) of precipitation, and the driest is July, with 15 millimetres (0.59 in) of precipitation.

== Power station ==
The 8 MW Mugere Hydroelectric Power Station was the first hydroelectric plant in Burundi. The government of China financed its original construction in the late 1970s and early 1980s. It was commissioned in 1982. Successive rehabilitation projects were undertaken with Chinese financing in 1987, 1993, 2000 and 2009–2010. As of 2010 the power station provided almost 30% of the electricity supplied to the city of Bujumbura, and 40% of the hydroelectric capacity of the state-owned water and power utility Regideso, Burundi.

== Issues ==
In January 2013 an expert in geomorphology warned that there was a risk that the Muhere dam in the Giheta colline would collapse. In several places cracks were visible on the hill, and the road to the dam was cut in three places. If heavy rain continued, the Giheta River could flood the dam.

While the Ruziba Market was being rebuilt, in 2015 it was temporarily relocated to a site beside the Mugere River. In January 2016 the river overflowed and swept away more than 50 market stalls and some goods. It caused flooding in shops under construction in the market, and the collapse of some plots of land.

In March 2023 during the rainy season the log bridge over the Mugere River in Mutambu was carried away by the waters of the river. Students had difficulty crossing the river to get to school.

For some time, rubble and gravel were extracted by cooperatives from the bed of the river for use in construction in Bujumbura. In some sites, this created a risk of landslides. As of October 2023 the sites on the Mugere River upstream of the RN3 bridge were closed. All but one of the sites downstream of the bridge had been reopened.

== See also ==
- List of rivers of Burundi

== Sources ==
- U.S. Defense Mapping Agency (1994), Bujumbura (PDF), University of Texas at Austin
- "Des ponts et ponceaux s'écroulent", ABP (in French), 3 March 2023
- U.S. Defense Mapping Agency (1994), Gakara (PDF), University of Texas at Austin
- "Le barrage de Mugere menacé", Isanganiro (in French), 11 January 2013
- "Les pluies de ce dimanche ont endommagé le marché de Ruziba", Isanganiro (in French), 18 January 2016
- Mpundunziza, Laurent (15 October 2023), "Ministère en charge de l'environnement: Visite de terrain sur les sites de curage de moellons et graviers", Le Renouveau (in French)
- U.S. Defense Mapping Agency (1994), Mwaro, University of Texas at Austin
- NASA Earth Observations: Population Density, NASA/SEDAC, archived from the original on 9 February 2016
- NASA Earth Observations Data Set Index, NASA, archived from the original on 28 November 2017 Temperature data from satellite measurements of the earth's surface temperature within a box that is 0.1 x 0.1 degrees.
- NASA Earth Observations: Rainfall (1 month - TRMM), NASA/Tropical Rainfall Monitoring Mission, archived from the original on 19 April 2019 Average value for the years 2012–2014 within a box that is 0.1 x 0.1 degrees.
- Nsabimana, René (September 2022), Quality of service and access to electricity in Burundi and East Africa, a comparison of sector performance (PDF) (Dissertation), University of Liège
- Nzeyimana, Martine (15 January 2016), "Nouveau marché de Ruziba dans les eaux", Iwacu (in French)
- "Project ID: 825 Chinese Government provides RMB 30 million grant for Fourth Phase of 8MW Mugere Hydroelectric Power Plant Rehabilitation Project", Aiddata, William & Mary
- "Relation: Mugere (17502777)", OpenStreetMap
