= Muha (commune) =

Commune of Muha
- Commune
- Interactive map of Commune of Muha
- Country: Burundi

Area
  - Total: 39 km^{2} (15 sq mi)

Population
  - Total: 297,000
  - Density: 7,600/km^{2} (20,000/sq mi)
- Time zone: UTC+2 (Central Africa Time)

Muha is a commune of Bujumbura Mairie Province in Burundi.

== See also ==
- Communes of Burundi
