= Ntahangwa (commune) =

Commune of Ntahangwa
- Commune
- Ntahangwa
- Interactive map of Commune of Ntahangwa
- Country: Burundi

Area
  - Total: 68 km^{2} (26 sq mi)

Population (2019)
  - Total: 498,547
  - Density: 7,300/km^{2} (19,000/sq mi)
- Time zone: UTC+2 (Central Africa Time)

Ntahangwa is a commune of Bujumbura Mairie Province in Burundi.

It is named for the Ntahangwa River, which flows through the commune.

== See also ==
- Communes of Burundi
