= Bujumbura Mairie Province =

Former province of Burundi

Coordinates: 3°22′44″S 29°21′39″E

- Province
- Country: Burundi
- Province: Bujumbura Mairie
- Commune: Muha; Mukaza; Ntahangwa
- Capital: Bujumbura

Government
  - Mayor: Jimmy Hatungimana (CNDD-FDD)

Area
  - Total: 127 km^{2} (49 sq mi)

Population (2021 census)
  - Total: 1,225,142
  - Density: 9,650/km^{2} (25,000/sq mi)

Bujumbura Mairie Province was one of the eighteen provinces of Burundi. It consisted entirely of the city of Bujumbura, Burundi's largest city and economic capital. In 2025, it was merged into the new Bujumbura Province.

== Location ==
Bujumbura Mairie Province was in the west of Burundi. It bordered Lake Tanganyika to the west and was surrounded by Bujumbura Rural Province to the north, east and south. It was in the Imbo natural region apart from a small section of the east in the Mumirwa natural region.

== History ==
It was created by splitting Bujumbura Province into Bujumbura Mairie Province and Bujumbura Rural Province.

== Administrative subdivisions ==
The city of Bujumbura was divided into three communes (as of 2014), which were sub-divided into 13 neighborhoods (per Ministerial Order No. 530/1279 of 22 September 2005), which were further sub-divided into quarters

- Commune of Muha
  - Kanyosha
    - Quarters: Gisyo-Nyabaranda, Musama, Nyabugete, Kizingwe-Bihara, Nkega-Busoro, Ruziba, Kajiji
  - Kinindo
    - Quarters: Kibenga, Kinanira I, Kinanira II, Kinanira III, Kinindo, Zeimet-OUA
  - Musaga
    - Quarters: Gasekebuye-Gikoto, Gitaramuka, Kamesa, Kinanira I, Kinanira II
- Commune of Mukaza
  - Buyenzi
    - Quarters: I, II, III, IV, V, VI, VII
  - Bwiza
    - Quarters: Bwiza I, Bwiza II, Bwiza III, Bwiza IV, Kwijabe I, Kwijabe II, Kwijabe III
  - Nyakabiga
    - Quarters: Kigwati, Nyakabiga I, Nyakabiga II, Nyakabiga III
  - Rohero
    - Quarters: Centre Ville, Rohero I - Gatoke, Kabondo, Mutanga-Sud - Sororezo, Asiatique, I.N.S.S, Rohero II, Kiriri-Vugizo
- Commune of Ntahangwa
  - Buterere
    - Quarters: Buterere I, Buterere II A, Buterere II B, Kabusa, Kiyange, Maramvya, Mubone, Mugaruro, Kiyange
  - Cibitoke
    - Quarters: I, II, III, IV, V, VI, VII
  - Gihosha
    - Quarters: Gasenyi, Gihosha, Gikungu, Kigobe, Mutanga-Nord, Muyaga, Nyabagere, Taba, Winterekwa
  - Kamenge
    - Quarters: Gikizi, Gituro, Heha, Kavumu, Mirango I, Mirango II, Songa, Teza, Twinyoni
  - Kigobe
    - Quarters: Kigobe Nord, Kigobe Sud
  - Kinama
    - Quarters: Bubanza, Buhinyuza, Bukirasazi I, Bukirasazi II, Bururi, Carama, Gitega, Kanga, Muramvya, Muyinga, Ngozi, Ruyigi, SOCARTI.
  - Ngagara
    - Quarters: I, II, III, IV, V, VI, VII, VIII, IX, Industriel

== Sources ==
- Atlas des quatre sites Ramsar: Localisation et Resources (PDF) (in French), Ministry of Water, Environment and Urbanism, October 2014
