= Union Commerciale d'Assurances et de Réassurance =

Commercial Insurance and Reinsurance Union of Burundi
- Trade name: UCAR
- Native name: Union Commerciale d'Assurances et de Réassurance
- Founded: 19 June 1986; 40 years ago
- Headquarters: Bujumbura, Burundi
- UCAR Headquarters (Burundi)
- Website: https://www.ucar-vie.com/ (Life Insurance)

The Commercial Insurance and Reinsurance Union of Burundi (French: Union Commerciale d'Assurances et de Réassurance), or UCAR, is an insurance company based in Bujumbura, Burundi. Two separate subsidiaries provide life insurance and other insurance.

== History ==
UCAR was created by Burundian partners, including the State of Burundi, on 19 June 1986. The Union des Assurances De Paris (UAP) provided technical assistance. It was approved by ministerial order No. 540/326 on 12 September 1986. Share capital was 60,000,000 BIF, of which the state of Burundi held 30%, UAP held 10% and Burundian private shareholders held 60%. Capital was increased to 150,000,000 BIF in 1990. UAP sold their shares in 1995.

Under the transitional government's 2002–05 privatization program, the state's 12% stake of the Commercial Insurance and Reinsurance Union of Burundi was to be done through the issue of an invitation to tender in July 2004, followed by share transfer in October 2004. Under the terms of the World Bank's Economic Reform Support Grant, UCAR was one of 14 enterprises targeted in the 2006–2008 privatization program. The others were OPHAVET, BRB, Abattoir Public de Bujumbura (APB), REGIDESO, ONATEL, SOSUMO, COTEBU, OCIBU, OTB, SOCABU and SIP. The state of Burundi sold their shares in 2007.

In July 2008 there was one woman among the four senior managers, and one out of the nine on the management board.

The Insurance Code requires separation of Life insurance activities and Non-Life insurance activities. In 2017 the company was split into two companies, UCAR Vie et Capitalisation for life insurance, and UCAR Assurances Générales for general insurance.

== UCAR Vie ==
UCAR Vie et Capitalisation was created on 30 May 2017 to comply with law number 07/01/2014 Article 279, which states that companies that carry out both life insurance and non-life insurance must separate their life insurance from property and casualty insurance. It is a public limited company with share capital of 2,000,000,000 BIF. UCAR Vie et Capitalisation was provisionally approved on 4 August 2017 and definitely approved on 24 August 2018. Products include education, evacuation, and travel insurance, project savings, funeral expenses, credit protection and social protection.

Education insurance	A monthly or quarterly annuity paid for a defined period to a designated child, with guaranteed payment if the insured dies.
Evacuation insurance	Covers air flights to Nairobi, Kenya, for medical treatment, and optionally covers the treatment costs.
Travel insurance	Covers hospitalization expenses when travelling outside Burundi.
Project savings	A savings plan with payout to the insured, or to a beneficiary in the event of death.
Funeral expenses	Covers the insured's funeral costs.
Credit protection	Guarantees repayment of a loan in the event of death.
Social protection	A one-year term life insurance product.

== UCAR AG ==
On 1 June 2017 UCAR Assurances Générales was approved to practice non-life insurance operations. UCAR Non Vie was definitively approved on 27 June 2017. Approved products included:

- accidents
- land vehicle body
- sea, lake and river vehicle body
- transported goods
- fire and natural elements
- other damage to property
- air vehicle body
- legal protection
- various pecuniary losses
- land motor vehicle liability
- sea, lake and river vehicle liability
- general liability
- surety
- air vehicle liability
- sickness
- credit
- railway vehicle body

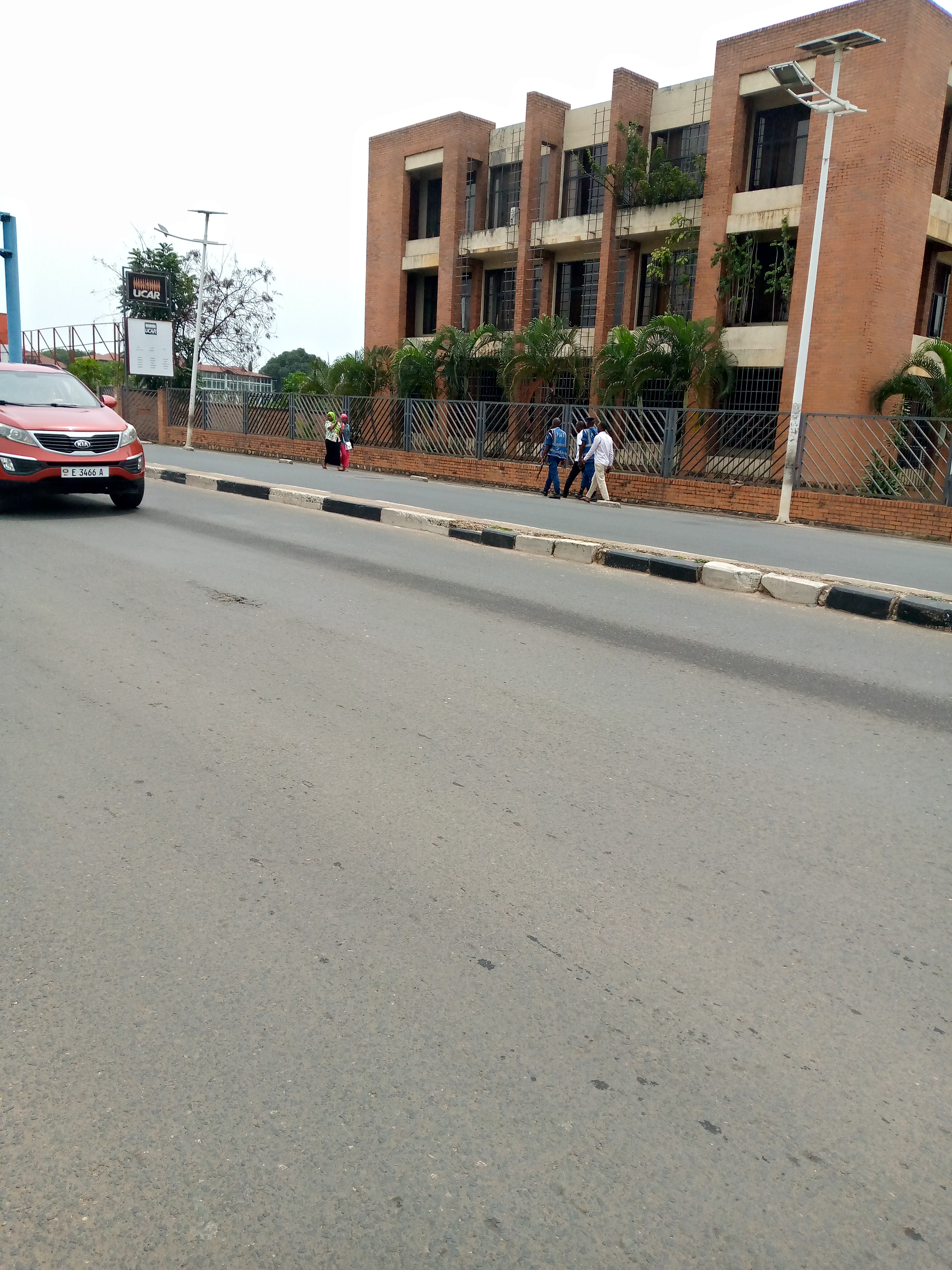
Headquarters of UCAR AG in Bujumbura

Between 2022 and 2024 UCAR AG was sanctioned repeatedly by the Insurance Regulatory and Supervisory Agency (ARCA) for concealment of information, violation of claims payment deadlines, failure to produce documents and obstructing the exercise of ARCA's missions. In April 2022 the company was placed under recapitalization with restriction of movements on its bank accounts. In September 2022 the free disposal of the assets was restricted. In September 2023 it was prohibited from subscribing to and renewing insurance contracts. This ban was lifted in April 2024.

== See also ==
- List of companies of Burundi
- Economy of Burundi

== Sources ==
- Assureurs (in French), Agence de Régulation et de Contrôle des Assurances
- Consideration of reports submitted by States parties under articles 16 and 17 of the International Covenant on Economic, Social and Cultural Rights, UN Economic and Social Council, 20 January 2014
- Decision no 540/93/009 du 01/6/2017 (PDF) (in French), Agence de Regulation et de Controle des Assurances
- Historique de l’UCAR VIE (in French), UCAR VIE
- Nos Produits (in French), UCAR-VIE
- Proposed grant in the amount of SDR 12 million to the Republic of Burundi for a financial and private sector development project (PDF), World Bank, 25 November 2009
- Suspension, Retrait et Annulation d'agrément (in French), Agence de Régulation et de Contrôle des Assurances
- WT/TPR/S/113 Burundi Trade Policy Review, World Trade Organization, 2003
