= Equipment Rental Agency (Burundi) =

- Trade name: ALM
- Native name: Agence de Location du Matériel
- Industry: Finance
- Founded: 27 October 2001
- Defunct: 22 May 2019
- Headquarters: Bujumbura, Burundi
- Owner: Government of Burundi

The Equipment Rental Agency (Agence de Location du Matériel, or ALM, was a public company formed in 2001 that supplied rental equipment to road construction and repair companies in Burundi. It was merged into The Burundi Road Agency in 2019.

== History ==
Until 2002 the general directorate of roads had its own equipment and accounting, and was funded by the state and by donors that included the World Bank. Based on World Bank recommendations, it was separated into three parts: FNR for funding, ALM for equipment and ODR for coordination of road activities.

The Equipment Rental Agency was overseen by the Ministry of Transport, Public Works and Equipment. It was governed by decree no. 100/119 of 27 October 2001. Law no.1/20 of 28 September 2013 said the state would transfer all or part of its interests in a named group of companies with state participation, including ALM. The approach to privatization would be decided on a case-by-case basis.

As of 2014 financing was through the state (FRN) and by donors such as the World Bank, African Development Bank, European Union, Arab funds and JICA (Japanese cooperation). Effective road maintenance was not widespread, in part due to lack of money, in part because the small and medium-sized road repair companies were inexperienced, underestimated the effort and failed to complete the work. The law that required jobs to go to the lowest bidder contributed to this problem. There were many cases where roads had been damaged by torrential rain and had not been repaired.

In July 2014 Ernest Mberamiheto, Minister of Good Governance and Privatization, answered questions in a National Assembly debate. Companies that had been recommended for privatization over a five-year period included SOSUMO (Note: SOSUMO: Société Sucrière du Moso (Moso Sugar Company)), SIP (Note: SIP: Société Immobilière Publique (Public Real Estate Company)), SRDI (Note: SRDI: Société Régionale de Développement de l'Imbo (Imbo Regional Development Company)), OTB (Note: OTB: Office du Thé du Burundi (Burundi Tea Office)), ALM (Note: ALM: Agence de Location du Matériel (Equipment Rental Agency)), COGERCO (Note: COGERCO: Compagnie de Gérance du Coton (Cotton Management Company)), LNBTP (Note: LNBTP: Laboratoire Nationale du Bâtiment et des Travaux Publics (National Laboratory of Building and Public Works)) and ONATOUR (Note: ONATOUR: Office National de la Tourbe (National Peat Office)). It was recommended that measures be put in place to prevent the assets of these companies being abused in the interim before privatization occurred.

Decree No. 100/009 of 23 January 2017 made the agency a public establishment with an administrative character.

The Burundi Road Agency (Agence Routière du Burundi, ARB) was created by Decree No. 100/080 of 22 May 2019, which dissolved three former General Directorates including the Roads Office (Office des Routes, OdR), the National Road Fund (Fonds Routier National, FRN) and the Equipment Rental Agency (ALM). The Burundi Road Agency is an administrative establishment with legal personality, its own assets and management autonomy. It maintains a multi-year plan, obtains funding, supervises and coordinates road maintenance activities, and builds new roads.

== See also ==
- List of companies of Burundi
- Economy of Burundi

== Sources ==
- Decree No. 100/009 of 23 January 2017 (in French), President of Burundi
- Decret No. 100-100 du 28 Mars 2011 (PDF) (in French), President of the Republic
- Hakizimana, Mireille (14 December 2016), Conseil des ministres: 11 points à l'ordre du jour (in French)
- Loi No1/20 du 28 septembre 2013 (PDF) (in French), Cabinet of the President
- Madirisha, Edouard (14 June 2014), "L'Office des Routes veut faire son travail, mais …", Iwacu (in French)
- Questions orales avec débat adressées au Ministre de la Bonne Gouvernance et la Privatisation (in French), National Assembly, July 2014
- Qui sommes nous? (in French), ARB
