= Twitezimbere =

Non-profit association in Burundi

Twitezimbere A.S.B.L.
- Location within Burundi
- Formation: February 1993; 33 years ago
- Type: Non-profit association
- Headquarters: Rohero I, Avenue de la JRR, N°25
- Coordinates: 3.38974°S 29.36901°E
- Region served: Burundi
- Website: www.twitezimbere.bi

Twitezimbere (Note: "Twitezimbere" is a Kirundi term meaning "Let's improve") ASBL is a non-profit association serving low income peasant farmers in Burundi. It assists them in adopting good farming and business practices, obtaining micro-credit, finding markets and so on. Challenges include illiteracy, traditional biases about women's roles, potential environmental damage from development projects and rapid population growth. Twitezimbere Microfinance, originating from and associated with Twitezimbere ASDL, is now a public limited microfinance company under the Ministry of Environment, Agriculture and Livestock.

== Origins ==
Twitezimbere is a Non-Profit Association (ASBL: Association sans but lucratif) that was created in February 1993 by a group of Burundian civil society organizations. It was governed by Decree-Law number 1/011 of April 18, 1992 on non-profit organizations.

On 20 April 1993 the President of the International Development Association recommended a credit of SDR 7.5 Million for a Social Action Project (BURSAP), or Twitezimbere in the local language, which would cut across the areas of growth, employment generation, essential services and monitoring of poverty. Project management would be contracted to the Twitezimbere non-profit organization, with which the government of Burundi had signed a framework agreement, and which had a management unit in place.

Sub-projects would be identified by communities and submitted to Twitezimbere for approval based on defined criteria. A mid-term review would determine the sustainability of Twitezimbere based on its implementation record. If it was successful in implementing micro-projects that had a good record of improving living standards, it was assumed that there would be no difficulty in raising funding from external donors, organizations and the government.

== Activities ==
Activities include:

- Support income-generating development activities and micro-companies.
- Improve infrastructure related to education, health, warehouses, pharmacies, drinking water, sanitation, fisheries, drainage, irrigation, bridges, erosion control and reforestation.
- Train people in entrepreneurship, self-development and management of micro-projects.
- Undertake surveys and studies to monitor socio-economic conditions.

Projects include:

=== PAGRIS ===
PAGRIS (Projet d’Appui pour une Gestion Responsable et Intégrée des Sols, Project of Support for Responsible and Integrated Soil Management) was a four-year project from March 2020 to June 2024, in a partnership between Twitezimbere, Wageningen University and ISABU. It was funded by the Embassy of the Kingdom of the Netherlands in Burundi. It covered 755 sites in 154 collines of 20 communes in the provinces of Bubanza, Bujumbura, Cibitoke, Gitega, Makamba, Muyinga and Rumonge. 100,000 farm households, 50% women, applied soil management practices on 22,000 hectares (54,000 acres) and increased their income by 25%.

=== Dolomie ===
The Dolomite Pilot Project was initiated within the PAGRIS framework by the International Fertilizer Development Center (IFDC) working with the Ministry of Environment, Agriculture and Livestock (MINEAGRIE). It promoted use of dolomite to correct soil acidity in conjunction with manure, fertilizers, improved seeds, soil protection and other good agricultural practices. Twitezimbere's intervention areas were in Bubanza (Bubanza and Rugazi), Bujumbura (Nyabiraba), Cibitoke (Mabayi), Karusi (Buhiga, Mutumba and Nyabikere), Muyinga (Muyinga), Mwaro (Gisozi and Rusaka), Makamba (Makamba) and Rumonge (Rumonge).

=== PADANE ===
PADANE (Projet d'Appui pour le Développement Agricole - Nutrition et l'Entrepreneuriat: Agricultural Development Support Project - Nutrition and Entrepreneurship) is funded by the Embassy of the Kingdom of the Netherlands and the SNV Netherlands Development Organisation. It covers the informal value chains for Amaranth, Japanese plum, Passion fruit, chicken, eggs and milk, and the formal value chains for White Sorghum, Sunflower and Patchouli.

The Market Access component runs in the provinces of Bujumbura, Bubanza, Cibitoke, Rumonge, Makamba, Gitega and Muyinga. It identifies markets for products and guides the flow of products from producers to markets. The Cooperative component runs in the provinces of Bubanza, Bujumbura, Cibitoke and Muyinga. The cooperatives facilitate ordering and purchase from the members and group sale of production, and arranges access to credits from financial institutions.

=== PSSD ===
PSSD (Private Seed Sector Development) seeks to develop the market for quality seeds and to sustainably establish seed production and marketing in Burundi. The target crops are maize, beans, potatoes. The project aims to develop national seed companies to supply quality seeds to small producers. It also aims to train smallholder farmers in good agricultural practices, and to support the private sector in setting up demonstration fields.

=== MSE ===
The population of Burundi grew from 4 million in 1979 to 5 million in 1990, 8 million in 2008 and about 13 million in 2023. This rate of growth, if sustained, will make it impossible to meet the basic needs of the population, including food security, education and health care. Population control is essential.

The Ministry of Public Health and the Fight against AIDS, in collaboration with Twitezimbere and ABS (Burundian Alliance against AIDS), studied prices, financial accessibility and availability of sexual and reproductive health (SRH) products as well as the provision of SRH services to adolescents and young people. Results were presented in November 2023. The products were generally affordable and accessible, although the WHO target of 80% had not been met. Adolescents heard conflicting messages, and were not always able to make informed choices. About 30% of public, private and volunteer health workers and 60% of faith-based providers believed that adolescent girls should not be provided with contraceptives.

MSE (Multi-actor commitment for family planning in Burundi) improves access, demand and availability of Sexual and Reproductive Health (SRH) commodities, particularly modern family planning methods and health commodities for women and adolescents. As of 2024 Health Action International, supported by the Embassy of the Kingdom of the Netherlands in Burundi and in partnership with Twitezimbere, was working on the MSE project. It aimed to improve access to health services, family planning methods, contraceptives and other sexual and reproductive health commodities.

=== PAIFAR-B ===
The Government of Burundi, supported by the International Fund for Agricultural Development (IFAD), initiated the Projet d’Appui à l’Inclusion Financière Agricole et Rurale au Burundi (Project to Support Agricultural and Rural Financial Inclusion in Burundi, PAIFAR-B). It is supervised by the Ministry of Finance, Budget and Economic Development Cooperation, and the Ministry of the Environment, Agriculture and Livestock is the project owner.

The PAIFAR-B / Twitezimbere Partnership aims to Improve financial inclusion after reducing extreme poverty and chronic malnutrition. This is to ensure social protection for the very vulnerable population, while preparing them, in the long term, to access the financial services offered by micro-finance institutions. The first step is to ensure that the targeted households escape extreme poverty and chronic malnutrition. Activities were initially concentrated on the 14 provinces covered by IFAD technical projects, Bubanza, Bujumbura, Cankuzo, Cibitoke, Gitega, Karuzi, Kayanza, Muramvya, Muyinga, Ngozi, Ruyigi, Rutana, Bururi and Rumonge.

== Gender bias ==
A 2024 article about women's participation in the Twitezimbere and Rekatujane rice cooperatives in the Commune of Gihanga, Bubanza Province, outlined some of the challenges. Traditional culture expects women to stay at home to care for the children and do household chores. The women are isolated and illiterate, and are reluctant to adapt to the new practices of cooperative rice farming.

The Twitezimbere cooperative had 81 members of whom only 12 were women. 80% of the women were illiterate, compared to 75% of the men. Some members said that "the woman is like a child who needs to be supervised. Since the time of our ancestors, it's been like that, it's a heritage." Husbands said they were masters of the home, and if they let themselves be dominated by their wife they would be cursed by the whole village.

The report recommended that the local administration should work with the leaders of the cooperatives to help change the attitudes of men who thought that women's place was in the home. They should also encourage women to participate in agricultural cooperatives through meetings and support, and should promote education of girls in rural areas.

== Environmental concern ==
Burundi began to plan a national environmental strategy in 1993, but made no progress due to the political crisis that year. With the support of the UNDP, work on the National Environmental Strategy was relaunched in 1998. However, there was lack of resources and no effort to promote the strategy, which was ignored.

During the first nine months of 1998, ASBL Twitezimbere was able to start 123 projects, and 159 sources were developed with a very small staff of six members and a support staff of four members. A 1999 report on the second social action project commended the work but noted that the already overloaded staff would have difficulty coping with studies of the environmental impact of their projects. ASBL Twitezimbere would not only have to promote environmentally sound activities, but would have to teach the beneficiaries the benefits of a healthy environment.

For example, construction of schools, health centers and commercial buildings could cause soil erosion due to extraction of construction materials such as sand and crushed stone, and manufacture of bricks and tiles. Inadequate drainage systems could also cause erosion. There could be damage to the wildlife habitat in nearby public forests, and sedimentation or contamination of water downstream from the project.

== Microfinance ==
In 1996 granting of micro-credits for income-generating activities began as part of the Poverty Reduction project, with the financial support of the African Development Bank.

Twitezimbere ASBL was one of the six founding members of the Network of Microfinance Institutions (Réseau des Institutions de Microfinance, or RIM) in 2002. The others were the National Bank for Economic Development (BNDE), the Financial Company for Development (COFIDE), the Cooperative Fund for Savings and Mutual Credit (CECM), the Municipal Development Fund (Fonds de Développement Communal, FDC) and the Cooperative for Solidarity with Peasants for Savings and Credit (COSPEC).

As of 16 July 2013 Twitezimbere Microfinance SA was a second category microfinance institution, approved by act D1/1090/2013 of the Bank of the Republic of Burundi. Under article 17 of Law No. 1/17 of 22 August 2017 governing banking activities and in accordance with article 2 of Regulation No. 001/2018 relating to microfinance activities, Twitezimbere Microfinance SA, incorporated in the legal form of a public limited company, was reclassified in the first category of microfinance institutions by the Bank of the Republic of Burundi, from 23 April 2019.

In September 2022 the Ministry of Environment, Agriculture and Livestock requested proposals for an individual consultant to develop the Twitezimbere Microfinance savings and credit manual. The contract was financed by PAIFAR-B through IFAD Grant No. 2000001940.

The Caisse Coopérative d'Epargne et de Crédit Mutuel (CECM) has an important agreement with Twitezimbere. It includes a guarantee fund, that includes loans from Twitezimbere related to income-generating activities. CECM is responsible for monitoring and recovery of credits, but collaborates with Twitezimbere if there are repayment difficulties. The agreement also concerns lines of credit or cash loans using funds from Twitezimbere when CECM does not have enough.

== See also ==
- List of companies of Burundi
- Economy of Burundi

== Sources ==
- Ange Moray, Multi-Stakeholder Approach to Family Planning, Health Action International
- Ashcroft, Mariama; Djoi, Didier; Ndikumana, Louis (June 2007), Microfinance au Burundi diagnostic et recommandations strategiques (PDF), Women's World Banking
- Manirakiza, Ferdinand; Ntakirutimana, Leonard; Bazira, Abel Bigawa (2024), "Determinants of Rural Women's Participation in Agricultural Cooperatives in Burundi: The Case of the TWITEZIMBERE and REKATUJANE Rice Cooperatives in the GIHANGA Commune", Archives of Food and Nutritional Science, 8 (1), Heighten Science Publications Corporation: 001–011, doi:10.29328/journal.afns.1001055
- Memorandum and Recommendation of the President of The International Development Association to the Executive Directors on a Proposed Credit in the Amount of Sdr 7.5 Million to the Republic Of Burundi for a Social Action Project (PDF), World Bank, 20 April 1993
- Multi-actor commitment for family planning in Burundi (in French), Twitezimbere
- Nduwumwami, Damas (April 1999), Analyse environnementale des activites futures du second projet d'actions sociales (PDF) (in French), ASBL Twitezimbere
- Niyongabo, Ephrem (2007), La recherche de pérennité par les institutions de microfinance au Burundi. Trois études de cas... (PDF)
- PADANE (in French), Twitezimbere
- PAGRIS (in French), Twitezimbere
- PAIFAR-B (in French), Twitezimbere
- Presentation of Twitezimbere Microfinance SA (in French), Twitezimbere Microfinance
- Projet d'appui a l'inclusion financiere agricoleet rurale du Burundi "PAIFAR-B" don fida n° 2000001940 (PDF) (in French), Ministere de l'environnement, de l'agricultureet de l'elevage
- Projet Pilote Dolomie (in French), Twitezimbere
- PSSD (in French), Twitezimbere
- "Twitezimbere Asdl", Esoko
- "Twitezimbere, pour un développement économique durable basé sur la Santé Sexuelle et Reproductive", Burundi Eco, 24 November 2023
