= COFIDE =

Development Finance Company
- Trade name: COFIDE
- Native name: Compagnie de Financement pour le Développement
- Founded: 14 May 2000; 26 years ago
- Headquarters: Ngozi, Burundi

The Development Finance Company (French: Compagnie de Financement pour le Développement, COFIDE) is a microcredit bank in Burundi.

== Foundation ==
COFIDE was founded on 14 May 2000, the first bank in Burundi to establish its head office in a rural area, as a financial institution for the poorest people. It financed coffee producers, the newly founded University of Ngozi, students, housing and small businesses. COFIDE provided microcredit, relatively small amounts of assistance where the operational costs and/or risk of non-recovery were relatively high.

On 17 July 2000 it was reported that Pascal-Firmin Ndimira, a former prime minister of Burundi, was going to take charge of COFIDE. He had headed the Burundi Financial Society (Société Burundaise de Financement, SBF) since August 1998, but had informed his superiors who had accepted his resignation. They included the governor of the central bank, the minister of finance and the president of Burundi.

== Community bank ==
COFIDE complemented the action of commercial banks in Ngozi Province in the north of Burundi, without compromising the stability of the financial system. It also provided service in Kayanza Province and Kirundo Province.

COFIDE's philosophy as a community bank was evident from the structure of its shareholding and the participation in the share capital of churches and non-profit associations. Its initial share capital was 600 million BIF, with 1,200 shareholders. The rural population subscribed small amounts of the share capital of COFIDE. They were organized into an association to subscribe to the capital, mobilize savings and facilitate access to credit. Small shareholders held more than half the capital.

COFIDE distinguished rural from other microcredit, and collective from individual microcredit. Collective microcredit was granted to groups that had a bankable project, a well-defined administrative or legal status, demonstrated capability, commitment of the individual members to the group and collateral. The group had to sign a credit agreement and pass their proceeds through their COFIDE accounts to facilitate recovery. Recipients of individual microcredit must have a bankable project, have real securities or a solid guarantee, and commit to repay through the signing of a credit agreement.

== Partners ==
The research center of the University of Ngozi (CERADER) provided technical support and analysis of credit application files, and support was also provided by the Union for Cooperation and Development (Union pour la Coopération et le Développement, UCODE), as well as [Coffee] Washing Station Management Companies (Sociétés de Gestion des Stations de Lavage, SOGESTAL). A technical intermediary such as CERADER or the Real Estate and Construction Company (Société Immobilière et de Construction, IMMOCO) might be involved with collective or individual creditcases, responsible for supervising implementation of the project.

The six founding members of the Network of Microfinance Institutions in 2002 were the National Bank for Economic Development (BNDE), the Development Finance Company (COFIDE), the Cooperative Savings and Mutual Credit Fund (CECM), the Municipal Development Fund (Fonds de Développement Communal, FDC), Twitezimbere ASBL and the Cooperative for Solidarity with Peasants for Savings and Credit (COSPEC). They wanted a framework to discuss their policies and strategies, to professionalize the sector and to establish a sustainable partnership system.

== See also ==
- List of companies of Burundi
- Economy of Burundi

== Sources ==
- Ashcroft, Mariama; Djoi, Didier; Ndikumana, Louis (June 2007), Microfinance au Burundi diagnostic et recommandations strategiques (PDF), Women's World Banking
- Burundi Étude diagnostique sur l’intégration commerciale (PDF) (in French), World Bank, September 2004
- "Former premier Pascal-Firmin Ndimira is leaving the Burundi Financing Society (SBF) for Ngozi-based COFIDE (Development Financial Company).", Net Press
- Hakisimana, Jean Baptiste (10 November 2004), Financement du secteur cafe au Burundi : profil et perspectives (PDF) (in French), United Nations Conference on Trade and Development
- Niyongabo, Ephrem (2007), La recherche de pérennité par les institutions de microfinance au Burundi. Trois études de cas (PDF)
- "The experiences: Cofide – Africa (Burundi)", Vita, 19 March 2002
