= Office Pharmaceutique Vétérinaire =

Veterinary Pharmaceutical Office
- Trade name: OPHAVET
- Native name: Office Pharmaceutique Vétérinaire
- Founded: 1986
- Defunct: 2006
- Owner: Government of Burundi

The Veterinary Pharmaceutical Office (Office Pharmaceutique Vétérinaire), or OPHAVET, was a state-owned company that distributed vetinerary products in Burundi.

== History ==
OPHAVET was created in 1986 when LAPHAVET (Laboratoire de pharmacie vétérinaire}, created in 1983) was divided into a veterinary laboratory that became a department of the government's Livestock service and OPHAVET. OPHAVET had management autonomy. Working capital was 6 million BIF. Provincial veterinarians were to be the depositaries of OPHAVET, and would ensure distribution and sale of medicines.

The law on privatization was promulgated in 1991. At the start of 1993 a call for tenders on privatization of OPHAVET was launched, but the process was delayed while the Interministerial Committee for Privatization (CIP) studied the matter. The request for bids had not drawn any bidders, so the technical committee recommended liquidating the company. The country became chaotic after the assassination of President Melchior Ndadaye in October 1993. An embargo against Burundi was imposed by countries in the sub region in 1996.

Under the terms of the World Bank's Economic Reform Support Grant, OPHAVET was one of 14 public enterprises targeted in the 2006-2008 privatization program. The others were OCIBU, BRB, Abattoir Public de Bujumbura (APB), REGIDESO, ONATEL, SOSUMO, COTEBU, UCAR, OTB, SOCABU and SIP. The target for the privatization of OPHAVET, APB, COTEBU, and the Source du Nil Hotel was the first half of 2007. However, there was little follow-up.

OPHAVET was liquidated after several private pharmacies which marketed veterinary products had been established, since it no longer had enough companies. As of 2008, OPHAVET was no longer functioning. Law No. 1/06 of 21 March 2011 regulated the practice of the veterinary profession, including pharmacies. The sector was completely privatized, but public services were inspecting pharmacies to ensure that products were not a threat to animal and human health.

== See also ==
- List of companies of Burundi
- Economy of Burundi

== Sources ==
- Berg, Elliot; Graham, Melissa; Hogan, Daniel; Ludvik, Carl (September 1994), Privatization and Development Project Midterm Evaluation (PDF), U.S. Agency for International Development, archived from the original (PDF) on October 5, 2006
- Bizimungu, Alexis (December 2016), "La privatisation initiée au Burundi depuis 1991 : bilan et perspectives", Cahiers du CURDES (16): 103–141
- Burundi: Letter of Intent, Memorandum of Economic and Financial Policies, and Technical Memorandum of Understanding (PDF), IMF, 21 February 2007
- Doazan, Ph. (February 1987), Rapport de mission à Bujumbun1 ( Burundi) (du 7 au 22 décembre 1987) (PDF) (in French), OAU
- Etats generaux de l’agriculture et de l’elevage, edition 2014 (PDF) (in French), Bujumbura: Ministere de l’agriculture et de l’elevage, November 2014
- Proposed grant in the amount of SDR 12 million to the Republic of Burundi for a financial and private sector development project (PDF), World Bank, 25 November 2009
- Report no. 15161 implementation completion report Republic of Burundi economic management and public enterprise credit, World Bank, 6 December 1995
- Sebushahu, Tharcisse (October 2008), Poultry sector country review, Bujumbura: FAO
