= Banque Nationale de Développement Économique =

National Bank for Economic Development
- Trade name: BNDE
- Native name: Banque Nationale de Developpement Economique
- Founded: April 4, 1967; 58 years ago in Bujumbura, Burundi
- Headquarters: Bujumbura, Burundi
- Key people: Major General Audace Nduwumusi, Chairperson; Pierre Mupira, CEO
- Bancobu Headquarters (Burundi)
- Website: www.bnde.bi

The National Bank for Economic Development (French: Banque Nationale de Developpement Economique, BNDE) is a bank in Burundi.

== Foundation and ownership ==
The BNDE was established in 1967 to assist Burundi's economic development by providing loan and equity funds to agricultural, industrial and tourism enterprises, and to finance housing.

As of 1977 share capital ownership was:

Type	Percent	Owners
Government of Burundi and public institutions	45.0%	Banque de la République du Burundi, Institut National de Sécurité Sociale, Office des Cultures Industrielles du Burundi
Foreign institutions	39.3%	Banque Belgo-Zairoise, Caisse Centrale de Coopération Economique, Deutsche Entwicklungsgesellschaft
Domestic commercial banks	9.3%	Banque Belgo-Africaine du Burundi, Banque Commerciale du Burundi, Banque de Crédit de Bujumbura
Local company	6.4%	Brasseries du Burundi

== History ==
BNDE was founded with a share capital of 60 million BIF. It survived the crisis that began in 1993, although its external lines of credit were frozen for over fifteen years. Unlike commercial banks, it does not support bank accounts, but mainly finances medium- to long-term development projects. These included schools, universities (especially private ones), health centers and civil servant housing. It was a leader in financing micro-projects and funding microfinance institutions.

The six founding members of the Network of Microfinance Institutions in 2002 were the National Bank for Economic Development (BNDE), the Development Finance Company (COFIDE), the Cooperative Savings and Mutual Credit Fund (CECM), the Municipal Development Fund (Fonds de Développement Communal, FDC), Twitezimbere ASBL and the Cooperative for Solidarity with Peasants for Savings and Credit (COSPEC). They wanted a framework to discuss their policies and strategies, to professionalize the sector and to establish a sustainable partnership system.

As of 2020 the BNDE was financing agriculture and livestock, industry and agro-industry, crafts, tourism, health and education, housing up to 15 years, refinancing of microfinance institutions, financing of renewable energy and ICT, CEMT, micro-credits and project savings. The BNDE had share capital estimated at over 10 billion BIF.

== See also ==
- List of companies of Burundi
- Economy of Burundi
- List of banks in Burundi

== Sources ==
- Ashcroft, Mariama; Djoi, Didier; Ndikumana, Louis (June 2007), Microfinance au Burundi diagnostic et recommandations strategiques (PDF), Women's World Banking
- "BNDE : mission accomplie à 53 ans d'existence", Journal Burundi Eco (in French), 26 December 2020
- Report No. 1460a-BU Appraisal of the Banque Nationale de Developpement Economique (BNDE) Burundi (PDF), World Bank Industrial Development and Finance Division, 10 June 1977
