= ARFIC =

Burundi Coffee Regulatory Agency
- Trade name: ARFIC
- Native name: Autorité de Régulation de la Filière Café
- Industry: Coffee
- Founded: 2009
- Defunct: 2020
- Successor: Office pour le Développement du Café
- Headquarters: 87 Avenue de la Tanzanie, Bujumbura
- Area served: Burundi
- Products: Coffee bags

The Burundi Coffee Regulatory Agency (Autorité de Régulation de la Filière Café), or ARFIC, was a public entity that regulated the coffee industry in Burundi. It replaced the Burundi Coffee Board (OCIBU) in 2009 as part of a privatization program. It was in turn replaced by the Office for Coffee Development (ODECA) in 2020 when the state took back control.

== Background ==
In 2022, the coffee sector in Burundi employed 600,000 farming families, and provided 90% of Burundi's export income. It was highly regulated by the government, with public institutions that enforced compliance with the laws and regulations. For example, coffee farmers in Burundi must grow Bourbon coffee and must deliver their coffee to a washing station, where it is processed and then exported as Burundian Bourbon coffee.

The coffee sector in Burundi was entirely state-owned until 1986. The Burundi Coffee Board (OCIBU) owned 133 washing stations and two hulling stations, and controlled marketing and sale of coffee. The state-owned BCC (Burundi Coffee Company) had a monopoly on export.

In 1990 the International Development Association provided US$28 million to reform the coffee industry in Burundi. OCIBU would divest its production facilities and become the Office du Cafe, purely involved in regulation. SODECO, a new autonomous company open to private investors would take over the two hulling factories from OCIBU. Five mixed private-public SOGESTALs were created in 1991 to manage the 133 depulping and washing stations that the state had created in all places where there was a high concentration of coffee orchards.

== History ==
In 2009 OCIBU was dissolved and replaced by the Autorité de Régulation de la Filière Café (ARFIC), a new regulatory agency for the coffee sector. ARFIC was a Public Establishment with Administrative Character (EPA) created on 1 June 2009. It was under the oversight of the Ministry of Environment, Agriculture and Livestock (MINEAGRIE).

ARFIC followed highly bureaucratic procedures to regulate harvests, milling, sales, and export. ARFIC represented the Burundi coffee sector in dealing with international institution, confirmed the quality of grades of Burundi coffee, mediated between exporters and importers, certified sales contracts, ensured foreign currency was repatriated and published statistics.

The Coffee Sector Competitiveness Project, defined in 2014 and supported by the World Bank, was to create the framework for deregulation and privatization of the coffee sector. Joint implementation responsibility was given to ARFIC, InterCafé and CNAC Murima w'Isangi, under the oversight of MINEAGRIE. Goals included removing inefficiencies by completing liberalization and privatization, improving technical and financial support to farmers, replacing old trees with younger trees, prioritizing production of high-quality berries, and improving transport services.

InterCafé was an organization of all the stakeholders in the coffee sector, resolved disputes between stakeholders, and arranged for fertilizer distribution. The fertilizer was purchased by MINEAGRIE through the National Fertilizer Subsidy Program. The coffee growers must contribute half the price of fertilizer obtained through this program, or up to 60% of the price of fertilizers from the World Bank. InterCafé worked with the Confédération Nationale des Associations des Caféiculteurs du Burundi (CNAC-Murima w'Isangi) in supervision, extension and joint missions to promote Burundi coffee abroad.

At a meeting of Burundian coffee exporters in November 2017 the managing director of ARFIC noted that international coffee prices had dropped because of growing production in Brazil. 16,000 tons of coffee had been produced in Burundi, but only 6,048 tons were exported. A representative of the exporters said that the price they had to pay to buy coffee had remained the same and communal taxes had greatly increased, while the sales price had fallen.

== Dissolution ==
In January 2020, the government of Burundi restored full state control of the coffee value chain. Déo-Guide Rurema, Ministry of the Environment, Agriculture and Livestock, held a press conference on 29 January 2020 where he announced that a new public company under his ministry, the Office pour le Développement du Café du Burundi (Office for Coffee Development) or ODECA, would replace ARFIC. It would also take over the functions of the CNAC Murima w'Isangi, Intercafé, the two SODECO companies and the five SOGESTALs. The organizations that had been abolished should return their tools to ODECA.

Other companies in the sector should pay their debts to the government, Regideso and the coffee growers. Private associations should contact ODECA to find out the new working arrangements. They should provide bank guarantees that they would pay the growers, and could expect no support from the government.

ODECA replaced ARFIC, Inter-Cafe and CNAC as the implementing agency for the Coffee Sector Competitiveness Project. This change seriously affected the ability of the project to achieve its goals.

== See also ==
- List of companies of Burundi

== Sources ==
- "Autorité de Régulation de la Filière Café (ARFIC)", Devex
- Bigirindavyi, Bonith (10 August 2018), "RFIC-INTERCAFE, Deux institutions complémentaires", Burundi Eco (in French)
- ICR00004849 implementation completion and results report - coffee sector competitiveness project, World Bank, March 2022
- Nibitanga, Alice; Anderson, James M (February 2010), Burundi Agribusiness Program Quarterly Report, Q1 PY 3 (October-December 2009) (PDF), USAID, archived from the original (PDF) on October 24, 2011
- Nininahazwe, Bella Lucia (7 November 2017), "Burundian coffee exporters fear going bankrupt", Iwacu
- P-5245-BU Memorandum and Recommendation of the President of the International Development Association ... Coffee Sector Project, International Development Association, 14 March 1990
- Reform of the Coffee Sector in Burundi: Prospects for Participation, Prosperity and Peace (PDF), USAID, May 2007
- Rigumye, Mariette (30 January 2020), "Filière café : ARFIC cède la place à ODECA", Iwacu (in French)
- Rosenberg, M. (2023), "Transforming Burundian "taste of place": From shunned in commercial blends to specialty coffee", Norsk Geografisk Tidsskrift - Norwegian Journal of Geography, 77 (4): 255–267, doi:10.1080/00291951.2023.2248997, hdl:10852/109540
