= National Laboratory of Building and Public Works =

- Trade name: LNBTP
- Native name: Laboratoire Nationale du Bâtiment et des Travaux Publics
- Founded: 14 December 1982
- Defunct: 2019
- Owner: Government of Burundi
- LNBTP headquarters in Bujumbura (Burundi)

The National Laboratory of Building and Public Works (Laboratoire Nationale du Bâtiment et des Travaux Publics), or LNBTP, is a public company that conducts tests on soils and matierials used in conxtruction projects in Burundi.

== Foundation ==
The National Laboratory of Building and Public Works (LNBTP) was created by Decree No. 100/129 of 14 December 1982 with the status of a technical department. By Decree No. 100/114 of 2 August 1990, it became an administration with legal personality, its own assets and management autonomy. Its board of directors has five members including the director, who are appointed by decree on the proposal of the Minister in charge of public works.

The original mission of the LNBTP was to undertake all tests, studies and research concerning soils and construction materials for buildings and public works.

== History ==
Ministerial order No. 720/158 of 18 July 1994 authorized involvement of private laboratories in execution of public works and building contracts awarded by the State. The private laboratories had to provide technical references and have sufficient and experienced staff. The LNBTP was the authority in assessing the quality of the services of private laboratories.

Ministerial Order No. 720/129 of 9 March 2001, still in force as of 2018, gave the LNBTP a monopoly on studies and geotechnical control of soils and materials for execution of public works and building contracts awarded in the name of the State. These must include a clause specifying the nature and frequency of the laboratory's interventions. Approved private laboratories could intervene in public contracts as self-control laboratories for companies or private individuals.

A 2004 World Bank report noted that LNBTP functions included supervising technical and geo-technical studies for roads. It had experienced and well-trained engineers, but did not have the capacity to plan and lead road programs executed by the private sector.

In July 2014 Ernest Mberamiheto, Minister of Good Governance and Privatization, answered questions in a National Assembly debate. Companies that had been recommended for privatization over a five-year period included SOSUMO (Note: SOSUMO: Société Sucrière du Moso (Moso Sugar Company)), SIP (Note: SIP: Société Immobilière Publique (Public Real Estate Company)), SRDI (Note: SRDI: Société Régionale de Développement de l'Imbo (Imbo Regional Development Company)), OTB (Note: OTB: Office du Thé du Burundi (Burundi Tea Office)), ALM (Note: ALM: Agence de Location du Matériel (Equipment Rental Agency)), COGERCO (Note: COGERCO: Compagnie de Gérance du Coton (Cotton Management Company)), LNBTP and ONATOUR (Note: ONATOUR: Office National de la Tourbe (National Peat Office)). It was recommended that measures be put in place to prevent the assets of these companies being abused in the interim before privatization occurred.

As of 2018 the laboratory had 48 permanent employees including 6 engineers, 10 technicians and 19 technical assistants. It was poorly funded, relying on fees and external aid, and faced competition from private laboratories. The LNBTP had a monopoly on tests relating to buildings, but the market was free and subject to competition for other types of works.

In 2019 by Decree No.100/079 of 24 May 2019 the LNBTP was merged with other entities into OBUHA (Note: OBUHA: Office Burundais de l’Urbanisme, de l’Habitat et de la Construction (Burundian Office of Urban Planning, Housing and Construction)), which was in charge of Urban Planning, Housing, and Construction. The other merged entities were SIP, ECOSAT (Note: ECOSAT: Encadrement des Constructions Sociales et Aménagement des Terrains (Social Construction Promotion and Land Development)), Municipal Technical Services (SETEMU), General Directorate of the Building (DGB) and General Directorate of Urban Planning and Habitat (DGUH). The new organization was responsible for sanitation, housing, and urban planning and development.

In July 2021 over 30 employees of the former LNBTP were dismissed. They were told that their contract had terminated when the decree establishing OBUHA had been signed, although their salaries had continued to be paid. They could take a recruitment test if they wanted to continue with OBUHA, join the civil service as new exmployees with no recognition of their experience, or accept severance pay. The employees were not told how to hand over, or to whom.

== See also ==
- List of companies of Burundi
- Economy of Burundi

== Sources ==
- Decret No 100/079 du 24 mai 2019 (PDF) (in French)
- Elaboration de la strategie nationale en matiere de planification et de gestion du secteur des transports et plan d'action 2018 - 2027 (PDF) (in French), Ministere des transports, des travaux publics, de l’equipement et de l’amenagement du territoire
- Manirakiza, Fabrice (6 July 2021), "LNBTP : les travailleurs dénoncent un licenciement abusif", Iwacu (in French)
- Nsabimana, Jean; Henry, Sabine; Ndayisenga, Aloys; Kubwimana, Désiré; Dewitte, Olivier; Kervyn, François; Michellier, Caroline (2023), "Geo-Hydrological Hazard Impacts, Vulnerability and Perception in Bujumbura (Burundi): A High-Resolution Field-Based Assessment in a Sprawling City", Land, 12 (10): 1876, doi:10.3390/land12101876
- PID: Burundi - Road sector development project (PDF), World Bank, 30 March 2004
- Questions orales avec débat adressées au Ministre de la Bonne Gouvernance et la Privatisation (in French), National Assembly, July 2014
