= Coopérative de Solidarité avec les Paysans pour l'Epargne et le Crédit =

Cooperative for Small Farmer Solidarity for Savings and Credit
- Trade name: COSPEC
- Native name: Coopérative de Solidarité avec les Paysans pour l'Epargne et le Crédit
- Founded: January 2001; 24 years ago
- Headquarters: Cibitoke Province, Burundi

The Cooperative for Small Farmer Solidarity for Savings and Credit (French: Coopérative de Solidarité avec les Paysans pour l'Epargne et le Crédit), or COSPEC, is a microcredit bank in Burundi.

== Foundation ==
COSPEC was created in January 2001 on the initiative of grassroots communities from the six Communes of the Cibitoke Province. It collects local savings to support microcredit loans for income-generating peasant activities in Cibitoke Province.

The six founding members of the Network of Microfinance Institutions in 2002 were the National Bank for Economic Development (BNDE), the Development Finance Company (COFIDE), the Cooperative Savings and Mutual Credit Fund (CECM), the Municipal Development Fund (Fonds de Développement Communal, FDC), Twitezimbere ASBL and the Peasants' Solidarity Savings and Credit Cooperative (COSPEC). They wanted a framework to discuss their policies and strategies, to professionalize the sector and to establish a sustainable partnership system.

== Approach ==
COSPEC holds information sessions on the merits of a savings and credit cooperative, and encourages voluntary membership. Any person or association can open a savings account for a membership fee of 800 BIF, and obtain a savings booklet. The amount of the share is 10,000 BIF. Savings are remunerated at 5%.

Members applying for credit must meet defined rules and must present a real guarantee. Credits have a duration of six months at a rate of 15% as of 2007. Recovery and monitoring of credit are done by the COSPEC representative at the commune level, supported by a committee of people chosen for their reputation, who serve as moral guarantors for the credit applicant. COSPEC works with administration officials to ensure recovery.

== See also ==
- List of companies of Burundi
- Economy of Burundi

== Sources ==
- Ashcroft, Mariama; Djoi, Didier; Ndikumana, Louis (June 2007), Microfinance au Burundi diagnostic et recommandations strategiques (PDF), Women's World Banking
- Niyongabo, Ephrem (2007), La recherche de pérennité par les institutions de microfinance au Burundi. Trois études de cas (PDF)
