= Network of Microfinance Institutions (Burundi) =

- Réseau des Institutions de Microfinance
- Abbreviation: RIM
- Formation: 2002; 24 years ago
- Type: Non-profit association
- Purpose: Rural development
- Region served: Burundi
- Website: rim.bi

The Network of Microfinance Institutions (French: Réseau des Institutions de Microfinance), or RIM is a non-profit association of microfinance institutions in Burundi.

== Origins ==
The six founding members of the Network of Microfinance Institutions were the National Bank for Economic Development (BNDE), the Financial Company for Development (COFIDE), the Cooperative Fund for Savings and Mutual Credit (CECM), the Municipal Development Fund (Fonds de Développement Communal, FDC), Twitezimbere ASBL and the Cooperative for Solidarity with Peasants for Savings and Credit (COSPEC). They wanted a framework to discuss their policies and strategies, to professionalize the sector and to establish a sustainable partnership system.

The RIM was approved by ministerial order no. 531/119 of 22 February 2002. As of 2024, it had 37 member institutions, accounting for 99% of microfinance volume in Burundi, as well as the BNDE financial institution. It is governed by the law on non-profit organizations, and by its statutes and internal regulations.

== Function ==
RIM membership is open to any microfinance institution in Burundi. The objectives of RIM as defined by its statutes and its 2005-2007 business plan include:

- Contribute to the improvement of practices and the professionalization of microfinance institutions through dissemination of information, exchange of experiences and training
- Represent members to potential sources of funding
- Influence the government in favor of microfinance
- Assist Government efforts in mobilizing resources for rural development
- Elaborate requests for institutional and organizational support to be submitted to fund donors
- Organize conferences, training seminars, study trips and sectorial studies for members.

== Activities ==
In May 2016, the legal representative of RIM gave a press briefing in which she reported that the 33 Microfinance Institutions (MFIs) approved to date by the Bank of the Republic of Burundi (BRB), had almost 730,000 depositors or clients in 2015, compared to 272,340 in 2004. Over 110 billion BIF, or about US$55 million of credits had been granted to 126,729 clients by MFIs in Burundi in 2015. She noted that most microfinance went to traders and small companies, but little went to agriculture, which provided a living for 90% of the population. Most of the credits were concentrated in the city of Bujumbura rather than the hinterland where most of the population lived.

In August 2019, RIM organized a Microfinance Week with the theme "Rural finance and innovation for effective financial inclusion". The chairman of the board of RIM noted that MFIs had served 904,614 clients between 2004 and 2018. In 2018, they had 1,966 employees and 379 service points throughout Burundi. RIM members included 17 savings and credit cooperatives, 19 public limited companies and one financial institution. That year they collected 177.8 billion BIF in deposits from 749,237 savers, and granted 270.7 billion BIF in credits to 308,773 borrowers. However, most MFIs were based in Bujumbura or large urban areas where infrastructure such as electricity and internet access was available, and most credits were for housing, trade and small equipment.

In September 2022, RIM organized a 5-month training campaign for managers and agents of MFIs. The campaign was funded by the Agricultural and Rural Financial Inclusion Support Project (PAIFAR-B), which in turn was financed by the International Fund for Agricultural Development (IFAD). The main objective was to improve recovery of loans to clients, since default rates of more than 10% were common in rural areas, and could be much higher after climate disasters. Non-payment rates should be no more than 5% to 10% if the MFI was to avoid bankruptcy. Training would also cover agricultural and rural finance, sustainable and green finance, gender and financial inclusion, and development of value chains.

In April 2023, RIM, in partnership with the Project to Support Rural Agricultural Inclusion of Burundi (PAIFAR-B), invited consultants of consulting firms to submit proposals for developing products adapted to women members of cooperatives and village savings and loan associations.

== See also ==
- List of companies of Burundi
- Economy of Burundi

== Sources ==
- Ashcroft, Mariama; Djoi, Didier; Ndikumana, Louis (June 2007), Microfinance au Burundi diagnostic et recommandations strategiques (PDF), Women's World Banking
- "Burundi : le RIM plaide pour l'accès des agriculteurs aux services financiers", Xinhuanet (in French), 19 May 2016
- "Le RIM engagé dans l'amélioration de la gestion et du recouvrement des crédits", Journal Burundi Eco (in French), 12 September 2022
- Niyongabo, Jean Marie Vianney (16 August 2019), "La contribution du RIM au développement est remarquable malgré les défis", Burundi Eco (in French)
- "Réseau des Institutions de Microfinance", Esoko (in French)
- "Réseau des Institutions de Microfinance du Burundi (RIM)", Le Renouveau (in French), 1 April 2023
