= OCIBU =

Coffee industry agency in Burundi

Insurance Company of Burundi
- Trade name: OCIBU
- Native name: Office des Cultures Industrielles du Burundi
- Founded: 29 June 1977; 49 years ago in Bujumbura, Burundi
- Headquarters: Bujumbura, Burundi

The Burundi Coffee Board (French: Office des Cultures Industrielles du Burundi, OCIBU), or Office du Café de Burundi, was a coffee industry agency in Burundi, since replaced by ARFIC;.

== History ==
OCIBU was founded with the mission of promoting coffee cultivation in Burundi, developing and enforcing quality standards, regulating marketing and issuing product information.

In December 1975 a loan to Burundi from the International Development Association was arranged for a second coffee improvement project. ISABU was to carry out a coffee research program and field trials, and OCIBU the rest of the project. This included procuring the distributing production inputs to coffee growers, building and equipping four coffee washing stations, organizing cooperatives and other community development activities, and building or rehabilitating potable water sources, bridges and culverts.

In 1990 reforms of the coffee industry began, with introduction of private operators to handle export, curing and roasting. The state maintained control of washing and de-pulping stations via OCIBU. In 2002 OCIBU had 133 washing stations, 5 SOGESTALs (Sociétés de Gestion des Stations de Lavage) and various industries including two SODECO (Sociétés de Déparchage et de Conditionnement du Café) plants.

Under the terms of the World Bank's Economic Reform Support Grant, OCIBU was one of 14 public enterprises targeted in the 2006-2008 privatization program. The others were OPHAVET, BRB, Abattoir Public de Bujumbura (APB), REGIDESO, ONATEL, SOSUMO, COTEBU, UCAR, OTB, SOCABU and SIP.

Until 2009 OCIBU had a monopoly in organizing the coffee market, regulating quality and arranging for technical assistance. In 2009 OCIBU was dissolved and replaced by ARFIC, a new regulatory agency for the coffee sector. As of December 2022 OCIBU, which was in liquidation, owned 11.11% of the insurance company Socabu.

== Sources ==
- "Commodity associations", Spore (152), April–May 2011
- Development Credit Agreement (Second Coffee Improvement Project) (PDF), International Development Association, 5 December 1975
- Nibitanga, Alice; Anderson, James M (February 2010), Burundi Agribusiness Program Quarterly Report, Q1 PY 3 (October‐December 2009) (PDF), USAID, archived from the original (PDF) on October 24, 2011
- Proposed grant in the amount of SDR 12 million to the Republic of Burundi for a financial and private sector development project (PDF), World Bank, 25 November 2009
- Rapport annuel 2022 (PDF) (in French), Socabu, May 2023
- Reform of the Coffee Sector in Burundi: Prospects for Participation, Prosperity and Peace (PDF), USAID, International Alert, May 2007, ISBN 978-1-898702-89-4
- Technical Audit of the Production Tools of the Coffee Sector, PROMAN, 2002
