= Adrien Ntigacika =

Burundian businessman

- Other name: "Ziranotse"
- Occupation: Businessman

Adrien Ntigacika is a Burundian businessman, best known for his involvement in manufacturing fertilizers that blend chemical and organic components.

== Early years ==
Adrien Ntigacika was once an employee of SOSUMO. He became a billionaire during the regime of President Pierre Nkurunziza.

An investigation into reported irregularities at SOSUMO in 2006-2007 included an item where a 6 by 2.4 metres (19.7 by 7.9 ft) container had disappeared. The managing director of SOSUMO provided correspondence on an agreement to sell the container for 500,000 FBU to Adrien Ntigacika, but no payment record was found. It turned out that the container had been transferred to the CNDD-FDD party, but the managing director did not declare it and invented the story of the sale to Adrien Ntigacika.

In 2014 Ntigacika founded ITRACOM (International Trading Company), which supplied road transport and imported chemical fertilizers. Later he set up ITRACOM Holding Ltd. to hold his increasingly diverse group of companies.

In September 2016 Adrien Ntigacika, representing the Provincial Committee of the Collective of Organizations for the Integrated Development of the Population (CODIP) distributed seeds to organizations in the communes of Rutana, Bukemba and Giharo in Rutana Province. The seeds were donated by the United Nations Food and Agriculture Organization and CODIP.

== FOMI ==
In 2019 Ntigacika founded ITRACOM Fertilisants, using the trade name FOMI (Fertilisants Organo-Minéraux Industries). That year imports of chemical fertilizers was banned and FOMI was given a monopoly on their manufacture. FOMI was the first fertilizer plant in the region. Manufacturing began in February 2019 with 250 employees. ITRACOM Fertilizers Ltd. (IFL) is a subsidiary of FOMI Fertilizers that distributes organo-mineral fertilizers in Burundi, Rwanda, Uganda, and the Democratic Republic of the Congo.

In December 2020 the Burundian Revenue Office (OBR) awarded Ntigacika a prize having been the first job creator during the 2020 financial year. As of 2021 FOMI employed over 3,500 people. In July 2021 Daniel Gélase Ndabirabe, President of the National Assembly of Burundi, visited the FOMI factory, where he congratulated Ntigacika for his contributions to the National Development Plan 2018–2027.

In November 2021 it was reported that excessive use of FOMI fertilizers might cause soil degradation. Despite expert advice, both Déo Guide Rurema, Minister of Agriculture and Alfred Niyokwishimira, general director of ISABU, chose not to change the recommended quantities. Radio Inzamba reported that the reason was that they had fallen out with Adrien Ntigacika, who was planning to build a cement factory on ISABU land in Rutana Province.

== Other activities ==
In 2020 Ntigacika set up the Banque Communautaire et Agricole du Burundi (BCAB) and INKINZO insurance. On 15 September 2020 Evariste Ndayishimiye, President of Burundi, inaugurated an extension of the FOMI factory, the Agricultural Community Bank of Burundi and Inkinzo insurance in Bujumbura Mairie. In February 2021 the Commune of Gitega banned bicycle taxis from the city center. Their place would be taken by buses owned by Adrien Ntigacika. Ntigacika founded ITRACOM Packaging (ITRAPACK) in 2021 to manufacture bags for packaging fertilizers and agricultural crops.

In April 2021 the Tanzanian authorities gave Ntigacika land in Dodoma, Tanzania, as the site of a huge fertilizer plant for Itracom Fertilizers. It would cost US$180 million and was expected to produce 600,000 tons of organic fertilizer annually, and to directly employ at least 3,000 people.

In March 2023 Gabriel Rufyiri, president of Olucome (Observatory for the fight against corruption and economic malfeasance), met the Prime Minister of Burundi. A few days later he attacked the "Burundian oligarchs", Olivier Suguru, Adrien Ntigacika and Vénérand Kazohera, who received all the public contracts. He said the national bank (BNB) reserved foreign currency for imports of medicines, fertilizers and fuel, which these individuals controlled. He also asked for clarity of how the "Prestige" company was awarded the fuel market.

== Sources ==
- About Company, ITRACOM
- Beginning of the parliamentary recess: The National Assembly visits FOMI factory., National Assembly of Burundi
- Bigirimana, Raphaël (16 September 2020), "Le Chef de l'Etat inaugure plusieurs oeuvres en mairie de Bujumbura", Radio Télévision Nationale du Burundi (in French)
- "Burundi : Rutana – Le CODIP remet 241 Kg de semences et 35 houes", AGnews (in French), 21 September 2016
- "Gitega : les taxis-vélos interdits d'accès au centre-ville pour les intérêts d'un tiers", Radio Inzamba (in French), 23 February 2021
- "L'homme d'affaires Ziranotse au cœur d'un scandaleux marché de bottines militaires : la livraison ne chausse que le pied droit des hommes en treillis", BurundiDaily.net (in French), 12 July 2023
- Manirakiza, Fabricet; Ndabashinze, Rénovat (11 September 2023), "Gouvernement & FOMI : Le désamour ?", Iwacu (in French)
- Mbazumutima, Abbas (22 March 2023), "Olucome: "A small clique is getting rich on the backs of the taxpayer"", Iwacu (in French)
- Notre histoire (in French), ITRACOM Holding
- "Porté par le régime CNDD-FDD, Adrien Ntigacika déploie ses ailes sur la Tanzanie avec "ITRACOM Fertilizers"", BurundiDaily.net (in French), 22 April 2021
- Rapport d’investigations sur les actes de malversation imputes a la direction de la Sosumo durant la periode 2006-2007 (PDF) (in French), IGE, 2009
- "Un bras de fer qui risque de plonger l'agriculture dans l'abîme", Radio Inzamba (in French), 16 November 2021
- Visite du Très Honorable Daniel Gélase NDABIRABE, Président de l’Assemblée Nationale du Burundi à la FOMI (in French), FOMI
