= Société de Gestion des Stations de Lavage =

Washing Station Management Company
- Trade name: SOGESTAL
- Native name: Société de Gestion des Stations de Lavage
- Industry: Coffee production
- Founded: 1991
- Defunct: 2020
- Area served: Burundi

A Société de Gestion des Stations de Lavage (Washing Station Management Company), or SOGESTAL, was a public-private company that coordinated the activities of coffee washing stations in Burundi and arranged to sell the coffee. There were five of these companies, covedring different regions of the country. Theny struggled to survive as the industry was opened to competition. The SOGESTALs were founded in 1991 and dissolved in 2020.

== History ==
The coffee sector in Burundi was entirely state-owned until 1986. The Burundi Coffee Board (OCIBU) had the mission of promoting coffee cultivation in Burundi, developing and enforcing quality standards, regulating marketing and issuing product information. OCIBU owned 133 washing stations and two hulling stations, and controlled marketing and sale of coffee. The state-owned BCC (Burundi Coffee Company) had a monopoly on export.

In 1986 Burundi began the structural adjustment policies advocated by the World Bank and IMF, under which privatization of the coffee sector was given a high priority. In 1990 the International Development Association provided US$28 million to reform the coffee industry in Burundi. OCIBU would divest its production facilities and become the Office du Cafe, purely involved in regulation. SODECO, a new autonomous company open to private investors would take over the two hulling factoris from OCIBU. Five mixed private-public SOGESTALs were created in 1991 to manage the 133 depulping and washing stations that the state had created in all places where there was a high concentration of coffee orchards.

The washing stations were managed by the SOGESTALs, but owned by the government through OCIBU. The state retained ownership shares in the SOGESTALs. Private operators acquired shares in OCIBU, SODECO and the SOGESTALs. Sonicoff, a private company, also established de-pulping and washing stations in Karuzi Province.

By 2007 the BCC had lost its monopoly on export. Coffee for export was sold at auction, but the SOGESTALs increasingly sold directly. Until 2009 OCIBU had a monopoly in organizing the coffee market, regulating quality and arranging for technical assistance. The Twitezimbere microfinance fund was involved in the coffee sector, lending to farmers when they delivered cherries to the washing stations, and receiving payments later from the SOGESTALs when they in turn were paid by OCIBU.

In 2009 OCIBU was dissolved and replaced by ARFIC, a new regulatory agency for the coffee sector. The first 13 washing stations owned by the government of Burundi were sold to Webcor, a private investor, in 2009. Webcor would buy coffee cherries on the basis of "cash on arrival of cherry", a fundamental change. The SOGESTAL's would have to negotiate new financing arrangements to be able to compete with Webcor. Other private coffee actors included COPROTRA, Ubwiza Bw'ikawa and Gatukuza.

In December 2019 the Ministry of Finance notified Sogestal Kirundo-Muyinga that it was in breach of its contract with the state. It was behind in rent payments, had not maintained rental property, had failed to pay staff and to pay taxes and duties, and had not organized the coffee campaign effectively. A sum of 3.8 billion BIF was overdue to the state. The lease contract between Sogestal Kirundo-Muyinga and the Burundian State was terminated on 15 January 2020. In March 2020 the shareholders of the Sogestal decided to terminate the activities of the company, and transfer some of its assets to the Office du Développement du Café (ODECA), a state organization with 20 employees. In 2020, most Sogestal stations transitioned to government control under ODECA.

== List of SOGESTALs ==
As of May 2010 the five SOGESTALs in Burundi were:

SOGESTAL	Capital (BIF)	State % 2007	Provinces	Sample washing stations
Kayanza	30,600,000	14.20%	Kayanza	Butegana; COPROTRA; CPC; KAREHE; BWAYI; Kinyovu; Kiriyama; Rohororo
Kirimiro	50,100,000	68.00%	Muramvya; Gitega; Karuzi; Rutana; Ruyigi	Butemba; Kibuye; Mahonda; Teka
Kirundo-Muyinga	101,000,000	48.00%	Kirundo; Muyinga	Kagombe; Murago; Ngogomo; Nyamasaka; Rugerero; Buhimba; Gasura
Mumirwa	30,200,000	81.00%	Cibitoke; Bubanza; Bujumbura; Bururi; Bururi; Makamba	Buhayira; Mugina; Murwi; Ntamba
Ngozi	51,000,000	26.90%	Ngozi	Rugabo; Ruhama; Gatukuza; Gitwa; Rutegana; Rwintare; Murambi

== See also ==
- List of companies of Burundi

== Sources ==
- Burundi / Mahonda Station, Alabaster Coffee
- "Commodity associations", Spore (152), April–May 2011
- Gahama, Pacifique (16 November 2020), "Sogestal Kirundo-Muyinga : les anciens employés à genou", Iwacu (in French)
- Lentz, Benjamin E (2010a), Burundi Agribusiness Program: Quarterly Report 1 October - 31 December 2009 (PDF), USAID, archived from the original (PDF) on October 24, 2011
- Lentz, Benjamin E (2010b), Burundi Agribusiness Program: PY 3 Q2 Quarterly Report 1 January - 31 March 2010 (PDF), USAID, archived from the original (PDF) on February 24, 2017
- Nibitanga, Alice; Anderson, James M (February 2010), Burundi Agribusiness Program Quarterly Report, Q1 PY 3 (October-December 2009) (PDF), USAID, archived from the original (PDF) on October 24, 2011
- P-5245-BU Memorandum and Recommendation of the President of the International Development Association ... Coffee Sector Project, International Development Association, 14 March 1990
- Reform of the Coffee Sector in Burundi: Prospects for Participation, Prosperity and Peace (PDF), USAID, May 2007
