= Bujumbura Slaughterhouse Management Company =

- Trade name: SOGEAB
- Native name: Société de Gestion de l’Abattoir de Bujumbura
- Founded: 20 August 2010
- Owner: Government of Burundi
- Bujumbura abbattoir (Burundi)

The Bujumbura Slaughterhouse Management Company (Société de Gestion de l'Abattoir de Bujumbura), or SOGEAB, is a company that operates abattoirs in Burundi. It took over the assets of the Bujumbura Public Slaughterhouse (Abattoir Public de Bujumbura) or APB.

== Public abattoir ==
The Bujumbura Public Abattoir (APB) was built in 1958. The site has an area of 16,800 square metres (181,000 sq ft). It has a parking area, an administrative block and a large building where the animals are processed. It contains the slaughterhouse room, the bleeding room, a dressing room for removal, evisceration, and skinning to extract the carcasses; the cold room, an incinerator and corridors for cattle, small ruminants and pigs. The water and electricity supply is provided by REGIDESO, the public water and electricity company.

The wastewater and blood are evacuated to the pit along the same channels. The eviscerated contents of the bellies are dumped behind the large building. During the 2009 financial year, 26,215 cattle, 54,339 small ruminants and 6,205 pigs were slaughtered. Over time the city has grown round the abattoir, which poses a serious threat to public health and hygiene. The layout, equipment and lack of infrastructure at the slaughterhouse does not allow the animals to be slaughtered in a professional and humane way.

The APB was an autonomous managed organization under the Ministry of Agriculture and Livestock. Under the terms of the World Bank's Economic Reform Support Grant, the APB was one of 14 public enterprises targeted in the 2006–2008 privatization program. The others were OCIBU, BRB, OPHAVET, REGIDESO, ONATEL, SOSUMO, COTEBU, UCAR, OTB, SOCABU and SIP.

The APB was a major supplier to AFRITAN, a tannery.

== Private company ==
The Bujumbura Public Slaughterhouse was privatized in 2010, with the assets of the APB transferred from the State of Burundi to the Société de Gestion de l'Abattoir de Bujumbura (SOGEAB) of 20 August 2010. SOGEAB was a group of ten businessmen. They included former managers and staff of APB. By 2018 the abattoir, which could slaughter 100 cattle per day on average, was no longer able to meet demand from local butchers.

SOGEAB began construction of a modern abattoir in Muzinga, Bubanza Province, in 2018, made possible when that location was connected to the electricity grid. The electricity would be used to power a cooling system to preserve the carcasses. The abattoir was expected to be able to handle at least 200 animals per day. It was expected to cost about 5 billion BIF, or US$2.6 million.

Design of the new slaughterhouse followed advice given by the Food and Agriculture Organization of the United Nations (FAO). The location was well drained and near a transport route. Covered pens supplied with drinking water would be provided so the animals could rest before being slaughtered. The abattoir would collect skins for manufacture of leather goods, use horns for everyday products and use blood to make blood meal, used in feeding livestock and poultry. The digestive organs would be transformed into biogas and compost.

== See also ==
- List of companies of Burundi
- Economy of Burundi

== Sources ==
- Bizimungu, Alexis (2016), La privatisation initiee au Burundi depuis 1991: bilan et perspectives (PDF) (in French), Bujumbura: Université du Burundi
- Burundi Environmental Threats and Opportunities Assessment (PDF), USAID, September 2010, archived from the original (PDF) on February 22, 2017
- Burundi : la crise de corruption, Crisis Group, 21 March 2012
- Élaboration de la Stratégie sectorielle pour le secteur de l'énergie au Burundi (PDF), IED, January 2011
- "L'abattoir moderne de MUZINGA à BUBANZA en construction depuis 2018", AGnews, 14 July 2020
- Maniragaba, Mélance (9 April 2021), "Un abattoir ne s'installe pas partout", Burundi Eco (in French)
- Ndayisenga, Aloys (2010), La reproduction d'un système paysan a travers les revenus extérieurs à l'exploitation. Le cas de la région du Bututsi au Burundi (PDF) (Thesis) (in French), Université de Toulouse II-Le Mirail
- Proposed grant in the amount of SDR 12 million to the Republic of Burundi for a financial and private sector development project (PDF), World Bank, 25 November 2009
- Quality meat and animal welfare in Burundi, Netherlands Enterprise Agency, 10 February 2020
- Sengabo, Bonaparte (21 December 2018), "Abattoir public de Bujumbura : L'arbre qui cache la forêt", Burundi Eco (in French)
