= Ernest Mberamiheto =

Burundian teacher and politician

Minister for Good Governance and Privatization
- In office 17 February 2014 – .
- Preceded by: Issa Ngendakumana

Personal details
- Born: Commune of Bwambarangwe, Kirundo Province

Ernest Mberamiheto is a Burundian teacher and politician.

== Early years ==
Ernest Mberamiheto was born in the Commune of Bwambarangwe, Kirundo Province. He is a Hutu. He was a militant in the Jeunesse Révolutionnaire Rwagasore (JRR), the youth wing of the UPRONA party, and then a member of UPRONA. He graduated in English Languages and Literature, and in 1985 joined the Ecole de Formation des Instituteurs (EFI) in Muyago, Cankuzo Province. When the EFI changed its name to the Lycée pédagogique he was appointed prefect of studies. He is a father of four children, including three girls.

== Political career ==
From 1990 to 1992, Mberamiheto was administrator of the Commune of Gisagara, Cankuzo. He was transferred to become administrator of the Commune of Bwambarangwe, Kirundo, a few months before the 1993 elections. He was elected deputy for Kirundo Province on the UPRONA ticket (3rd on the list). He would not sit until 1994, after the deputies higher on the list had moved on. After the elections he was stripped of his duties and returned to teach in Kinyinya. He taught at the Lycée du Lac Tanganyika during the 1995-1996 school year, then for three months was director of the Lycée Sainte Famille in Kinama.

When President Pierre Buyoya returned to power in 1996, Mberamiheto was a representative of the people in Kigobe. While in Kigobe, he was support manager as advisor in charge of social issues, director general of the National Assembly, deputy protocol officer, and legislative director. He left UPRONA in 2004 and joined the Frodebu party of Dr Jean Minani: He became deputy chief of protocol for Dr Minani, who was president of the National Assembly.

On 14 November 2007 Mberamiheto was appointed deputy minister responsible for primary and secondary education in the government of Pierre Nkurunziza. He served until 2010. In January 2008 Mberamiheto spoke at a workshop on the new guide for teachers concerning HIV education, which the government had launched with the United Nations Children's Fund. He noted that a 2004 study had found that 23% of school children in Burundi had had sexual intercourse by the time they were aged 14. After the 2010 elections, Mberamiheto was a manager in the evaluation office at the Ministry of Primary and Secondary Education, then Secretary General of the Senate.

== Minister of Good Governance and Privatization ==
On 17 February 2014 Ernest Mberamiheto was appointed Minister of Good Governance and Privatization. He replaced Issa Ngendakumana from the Frodebu Nyakuri party.

In July 2014 Mberamiheto answered questions in a National Assembly debate. Companies that had been recommended for privatization over a five-year period included SOSUMO, (Note: SOSUMO: Société Sucrière du Moso (Moso Sugar Company)) SIP, (Note: SIP: Société Immobilière Publique (Public Real Estate Company)) SRDI , (Note: SRDI: Société Régionale de Développement de l'Imbo (Imbo Regional Development Company)) OTB, (Note: OTB: Office du Thé du Burundi (Burundi Tea Office)) ALM, (Note: ALM: Agence de Location du Matériel (Equipment Rental Agency)) COGERCO, (Note: COGERCO: Compagnie de Gérance du Coton (Cotton Management Company)) LNBTP (Note: LNBTP: Laboratoire Nationale du Bâtiment et des Travaux Publics (National Laboratory of Building and Public Works)) and ONATOUR. (Note: ONATOUR: Office National de la Tourbe (National Peat Office)) It was recommended that measures be put in place to prevent the assets of these companies being abused in the interim before privatization occurred. In September 2014 Mberamiheto participated in a session of the Intergovernmental Working Group on Asset Recovery in Vienna, part of the Conference of the States Parties to the United Nations Convention against Corruption.

In November 2014 the National Assembly unanimously adopted the Protocol establishing the East African Community Monetary Union. Burundi would have a period of ten years to meet the prerequisites before accessing the single currency. Mberamiheto told the MPs that the goal was to achieve monetary and financial stability, necessary for sustainable growth. Membership would eliminate transition costs and exchange rate risk when payments were settled in the common currency.

In August 2018 Ernest Mberamiheto was president of the national commission for the state examination.

== Sources ==
- "Annexe 1 – Institutions au Burundi (situation au 1 mai 2008)" (PDF), L’AFRIQUE DES GRANDS LACS. ANNUAIRE 2007-2008 (in French)
- ARRET N° RCCB.1 DE LA COUR CONSTITUTIONNELLE DU BURUNDI PORTANT SUR LA REGULARITE DE LA PROCEDURE DE DESIGNATION DES MEMBRES DE L'ASSEMBLEE NATIONALE DE TRANSITION. (PDF) (in French)
- Conference of the States Parties to the United Nations Convention against Corruption (PDF), United Nations, 24 September 2014
- "Is HIV/AIDS education failing young people?", IRIN News, 31 January 2008
- "Le Burundi ratifie le protocole portant création de l'Union monétaire de l'EAC", Xinhua (in French), 26 November 2014
- Ngabire, Elyse (24 February 2014), "Ernest Mberamiheto, à la Bonne Gouvernance, un fidèle parmi les fidèles du Dr Jean Minani", Iwacu (in French)
- Nininahazwe, Bella Lucia (8 August 2018), "60,000 final year post-fundamental school students sit for state exam", Iwacu
- Questions orales avec débat adressées au Ministre de la Bonne Gouvernance et la Privatisation (in French), National Assembly, July 2014
- "Remaniement du gouvernement après un moment d'impasse", IGIHE (in French), 18 February 2014
