= CECM =

CECM may refer to:

- Centre for Experimental and Constructive Mathematics at the Simon Fraser University
- Certified in Ethics and Compliance Management at the John Cook School of Business (St. Louis University)
- Championnat d'Europe de la Coupe Mulet
- Commission des écoles catholiques de Montréal (Montreal Catholic School Commission)
- Computer Engineering Course Management, website of University of Tehran
- Convention européenne de la construction métallique
- Caisse Coopérative d'Epargne et de Crédit Mutuel, microfinance bank in Burundi
