= Imbo Regional Development Company =

- Imbo Regional Development Company or SRDI (in french Société Regionale de Développement de l'Imbo)
- Trade name: SRDI
- Native name: Société Régionale de Développement de l'Imbo
- Industry: Finance
- Founded: 1973
- Area served: Imbo natural region
- Owner: Government of Burundi
- Website: https://www.srdi.bi/

The Imbo Regional Development Company (Société Régionale de Développement de l'Imbo), or SRDI, is a public company that sponsors rural development in the Imbo natural region of northwest Burundi. The company was created in 1973, based on a development program for rice production that began in 1964 with assistance from the European Development Fund.

== Origins ==
The Lower Rusizi development program began in July 1964 with assistance from the European Development Fund to develop an irrigated area for rice production. Peasants were to be resettled in villages supplied with water from a dam on the Mpanda River. The project was the basis for the SRDI. The Société Régionale de Développement de l'Imbo (SRDI) was created in 1973 by Ministerial Order No. 710/27.

== History ==
Cotton farming was developed in the Mugerero area between 1969 and 1980, employing the indigenous population and migrants from overpopulated regions such as Mwaro, Muramvya, Kayanza, Gitega, Bujumbura and Ngozi. A rice processing plant was installed in 1976.

From 1984 to 1992 SRDI collaborated with AMSAR in a rural development project in East Mpanda led by Louis Berger International. The Mpanda East project run by the SRDI aimed to develop 12,875 hectares (31,810 acres) of land to the east of the Mpanda River. 5,000 farming families were to be installed to cultivate food crops and irrigated rice. Other improvements included development of water supplies, schools, dispensaries, electric supply and new roads. As of 1988 the SRDI controlled 1,000 hectares (2,500 acres) of irrigated rice fields, and had a rice hulling plant. Two Rice Producers Associations were piloted in 1989.

Decree No. 100/154 of 5 September 1997 harmonized the SRDI statutes with the code of private and public companies. In 1998, SRDI took over 647 hectares (1,600 acres) of the Rukaramu project's rice fields, 270 hectares (670 acres) for mixed farming and 300 hectares (740 acres) for social infrastructure developed with Chinese assistance. That year it began grouping rice farmers from the same villages into associations.

The European Union allocated over US$5 million to a project in Bubanza Province implemented by the FAO named "Contribution to the alleviation of the surge in food prices of the production capacities of the associations exploiting the Imbo perimeter," which was handed over in a ceremony at the headquarters of SRDI on 22 November 2013. The project included training in maintenance of hydro-agricultural infrastructure and tracks, and cultivation techniques. It also included rehabilitation of two irrigation water catchment areas and about 17.5 kilometres (10.9 mi) of rivers and dikes, over 61 kilometres (38 mi) of tracks and 66 kilometres (41 mi) of canals, and five 1,000 cubic metres (35,000 cu ft) storage sheds. The farmers also received 69 pairs of oxen, seeds, tools, fertilizers and a huller.

In July 2014 Ernest Mberamiheto, Minister of Good Governance and Privatization, answered questions in a National Assembly debate. Companies that had been recommended for privatization over a five-year period included SOSUMO (Note: SOSUMO: Société Sucrière du Moso (Moso Sugar Company)), SIP (Note: SIP: Société Immobilière Publique (Public Real Estate Company)), SRDI (Note: SRDI: Société Régionale de Développement de l'Imbo (Imbo Regional Development Company)), OTB (Note: OTB: Office du Thé du Burundi (Burundi Tea Office)), ALM (Note: ALM: Agence de Location du Matériel (Equipment Rental Agency)), COGERCO (Note: COGERCO: Compagnie de Gérance du Coton (Cotton Management Company)), LNBTP (Note: LNBTP: Laboratoire Nationale du Bâtiment et des Travaux Publics (National Laboratory of Building and Public Works)) and ONATOUR (Note: ONATOUR: Office National de la Tourbe (National Peat Office)). It was recommended that measures be put in place to prevent the assets of these companies being abused in the interim before privatization occurred.

In July 2019 a joint mission of the International Fund for Agricultural Development (IFAD) and the Government of Burundi reviewed the National Program for Food Security and Rural Development in Imbo and Moso (PNSADR-IM) program. It noted that in the Rukaramu area, the memorandum of understanding signed between the PNSADR-IM and the SRDI providing for the establishment of a single management structure was not being respected by the SRDI. The former committees set up by the SRDI and the new committees elected by the producers were not collaborating.

As of 2021 the SDRI was active in the Commune of Mpanda and the Commune of Gihanga in Bubanza Province, the Commune of Mutimbuzi in Bujumbura Rural Province and the Commune of Buterere in Bujumbura Mairie.

== See also ==
- List of companies of Burundi
- Economy of Burundi

== Sources ==
- "Bubanza/Grâce à la FAO, le rendement du riz a augmenté", Iwacu (in French), 5 May 2013
- Decret No. 100/071 du 15 Fevrier 2023 (PDF)
- National Programme for Food Security and Rural Development in Imbo and Moso Supervision Report (in French), IFAD, 12 July 2019
- Ndedi, Alain Aime; Furaha Kazinguvu, Eugénie; Kalimu Witakenge, Jonathan; Karenzo, Jérémie (25 September 2021), Socio-economic Promotion of Farmers in Burundi by the Société Régionale de Développement de l'Imbo (SRDI) (Promotion Socio-économique des Agriculteurs au Burundi par la Société Régionale de Développement de l'Imbo (SRDI)) (in French), doi:10.2139/ssrn.3930665
- Nsabimana, Stanislas (January 1988), "L'aménagement agricole de l'Imbo au Burundi. In: Géographie et aménagement dans l'Afrique des grands lacs.", Colloque de Bujumbura (in French), 3 (1): 48–58
- Questions orales avec débat adressées au Ministre de la Bonne Gouvernance et la Privatisation (in French), National Assembly, July 2014
