= Gisozi, Burundi =

Gisozi Kisozi
- Location in Burundi
- Coordinates: 3°34′S 29°41′E
- Country: Burundi
- Province: Mwaro Province

Gisozi, also Kisozi is a settlement in central Burundi and capital of the commune of the same name.

== Location ==
Gisozi is in Mwaro Province, to the southeast of Bujumbura (the largest city and former capital of Burundi) and southwest of Gitega (the current capital). It is on the RP33 road, which runs north from the RN7 highway through Gisozi to the town of Mwaro. There is a health center in the southwest of the village.

== Agronomic Research Station ==
The first tea cultivation trials in Burundi were set up at the Gisozi Agronomic Research Station (Recherche Agronomique de Gisozi) in 1963. This is a regional branch on the Institute of Agronomic Sciences of Burundi (ISABU).

In March 1999 the Italian Cooperation Office donated a 3"x3" water motor pump and a 4.5KVA/50hz generator set to the research station. In June 2017 the station was receiving technical and financial support from the International Atomic Energy Agency (IAEA) in research into using nuclear techniques to boost the productivity of cassava, an important basic food in Burundi.

== Sources ==
- "Burundi - Italy", Net Press (in French), Bujumbura, 2 March 1999
- Fitzpatrick, Mary; Parkinson, Tom; Ray, Nick (2006), East Africa, Footscray, Victoria: Lonely Planet, ISBN 1741042860
- Historique (in French), OTB
- Norbert (22 June 2017), "Le Burundi recourt aux techniques nucléaires pour augmenter sa productivité agricole", French.china.org.cn (in French)
- "Node: Gisozi (3128476142)", OpenStreetMap
