= FOMI =

Fertilisants Organo-Minéraux Industries (FOMI)
- FOMI
- Industry: Fertilizer manufacture and distribution
- Headquarters: Mutimbuzi zone, Commune of Ntahangwa, Bujumbura Province, Burundi
- Owner: Adrien Ntigacika, founder
- FOMI Headquarters (Burundi)
- Website: fomi.bi

FOMI (Fertilisants Organo-Minéraux Industries: Organo-Mineral Fertilizers Industries) is a company that manufactures fertilizers in Burundi.

== Creation ==
FOMI was founded by a businessman who was engaged in importing and distributing mineral fertilizers to meet a need for fertilizers in Burundi that were economical and did not have to be imported. ITRACOM Fertilizers LTD (IFL) is a subsidiary of FOMI Fertilizers that distributes organo-mineral fertilizers in Burundi, Rwanda, Uganda, and the Democratic Republic of the Congo. It was established by the International Trading Company (ITRACOM) and operates under ITRACOM Holdings.

The FOMI factory is located in Mutimbuzi zone of the Commune of Ntahangwa, Bujumbura Province. It is on the RN5 highway, 5.9 kilometres (3.7 mi) from the center of Bujumbura. It was founded by the businessman Adrien Ntigacika, and is the first fertilizer plant in the region. It produces three types of fertilizer and agricultural lime. Mineral fertilizers are imported and mixed with local organic manure.

In 2019 imports of chemical fertilizers was banned and FOMI was given a monopoly on their manufacture. Manufacturing began in February 2019 with 250 employees. Six months later there were about 500 employees, of whom 400 were contract workers, and the factory was producing 150 to 200 tonnes per day. The plant was expanded in 2020, and between 2019 and 2021 production rose from 200 tons to 500 tons. As of 2021 it employed over 3,500 people.

== Events ==
Given the dependence of Burundi on agriculture, any change to the inputs could have serious effects. Until 2019 all crop fertilization formulas in Burundi were based on chemical (mineral) formulas. Use of FOMI organo-mineral fertilizers in Burundi began in 2019. There were questions about the fertilizer's effectiveness compared to chemical fertilizers, particularly from rice farmers on the Imbo plain, but also from farmers of other crops. Trials began in 2019, and new formulas for rice, potato and maize were developed based on results.

In December 2019 the sugar company SOSUMO validated a study by experts from the Institute of Agronomic Sciences of Burundi (ISABU) that recommended using new techniques and types of fertilizer to boost production. The authors noted that the existing system had been unchanged for thirty years. SOSUMO agreed to now use organic fertiliser produced by FOMI, which would reduce costs, including foreign currency costs.

In November 2021 Déo Guide Rurema, the then Minister of Environment, Agriculture and Livestock, visited FOMI with a delegation and asked about availability of fertilizers. Demand was higher than supply, and Bubanza Province was complaining about lack of FOMI fertilizer. Although the stocks allocated to Bubanza were available, lack of fuel was affecting transportation to the province.The delegation also conducted a firsthand inspection of the FOMI fertilizer manufacturing process. The visit gave the fertilizer a clean bill of health. In December 2021 FOMI received three certificates issued by the International Organization for Standardization (ISO), further strengthening export of FOMI products.

In December 2021 Ministry of Agriculture arranged a workshop with ISABU, the International Rice Research Institute (RRI) and FOMI to present results and recommendations from research on the new organo-Mineral fertilizers. The new formulas used different combininations of the three fertilizers, FOMI Imbura, FOMI-Bagara and FOMI Totahaza, with recommended amounts per hectare. These fertilizers all contained 50% organic matter (manure) to boost calcium, magnesium, and potassium, plus the minerals nitrogen, phosphorus and potassium in different proportions. Research has been done on new export crops: chia, castor, pyrethrum, cashew and millet. and proved that FOMI fertilizers increase yields.

In September 2023 Sanctus Niragira, the new Minister of the Environment, Agriculture and Livestock, announced new fertilizer prices, and also stated that FOMI Totahaza fertilizer was being replaced by DAP/Urea, the main ingredient. Earlier claims of 30% increases in agricultural production were incorrect, but with the higher levels now recommended these improvements could be expected.

FOMI continues to provide fertilizers to farmers all over Burundi including Gitega, Butanyerera, Buhumuza, Burunga and other high value agricultural zones. FOMI supports the restoration of soil fertility, improved nutrient efficiency, and more productive, resilient farming systems. By helping farmers improve soil health and crop performance, FOMI contributes to climate-change adaptation by strengthening farms’ ability to withstand climate variability. It also supports climate-change mitigation by promoting more efficient input use and reducing reliance on imported agricultural inputs.

FOMI is actively expanding its production facilities to strengthen long-term availability, improve operational resilience, and progressively develop export capacity that will generate the foreign currency needed to secure critical inputs and spare parts. The company continues to provide suitable fertilizer solutions for different crops, including Totahaza fertilizer for non-rice crops and urea for rice production. FOMIs expansion program is focused on ensuring that Burundian farmers receive quality agricultural inputs when they need them most. The factory has been being expanded to meet domestic demand, and second to obtain foreign currency through exports. FOMI is supporting Burundi’s agricultural transformation through reliable fertilizer production and continued investment in industrial capacity despite several challenges.

== See also ==
- List of companies of Burundi
- Economy of Burundi

== Sources ==
- About Company, ITRACOM
- Beginning of the parliamentary recess: The National Assembly visits FOMI factory., National Assembly of Burundi
- Bigirindavyi, Bonith (20 September 2019), "FOMI : De l'engrais pour accroître la production agricole", Burundi Eco (in French)
- Gakiza, Dorine (5 December 2019), "SOSUMO : bientôt, des changements dans la culture de la canne à sucre", Burundi Forum (in French)
- "L'usine FOMI reçoit les certificats de standards internationaux", Biodiversité du Burundi (in French), 15 December 2021
- Manirakiza, Fabricet; Ndabashinze, Rénovat (11 September 2023), "Gouvernement & FOMI : Le désamour ?", Iwacu (in French)
- Message de bienvenu (in French), FOMI
- Misago, Jeremie (29 December 2021), "FOMI: Des formules de fertilisation actualisées", Iwacu (in French)
- Nkurunziza, Dieudonné (15 November 2021), "Les fertilisants organo-mineraux de FOMI répondent aux normes (Déo G. Rurema)", Radio Télévision Nationale du Burundi (in French)
- Ruzagiriza, Dona Fabiola (15 September 2023), "Réutilisation des engrais chimiques : L'efficacité des engrais FOMI remise en cause encore une fois", Burundi Eco (in French)
