= SODECO =

Husking and Packaging Company
- Trade name: Sodeco
- Native name: Societe de deparchage et de conditionnement
- Industry: Mining
- Founded: 1991; 34 years ago
- Headquarters: Burundi
- Bujumbura site (Burundi)

The Husking and Packaging Company (French: Societe de deparchage et de conditionnement, SODECO) is a public-private coffee company in Burundi.

== Background ==
In 1990 the International Development Association provided US$28 million to reform the coffee industry in Burundi. The Office des cultures industrielles (OCIBU), which both regulated the industry and participated in production, would divest its production facilities and become the Office du Cafe (Note: The Office du Cafe is now the Office de Développement du Café (ODECA).), purely involved in regulation. Five autonomous companies open to private investors would take over the coffee washing stations from OCIBU and the Regional Development Company (RDC), and would manage about 100 new coffee washing stations. SODECO, a new autonomous company open to private investors would take over the two hulling factoris from OCIBU.

== History ==
SODECO was created in 1991 with 82% state ownership and 18% private sector ownership. (Note: A June 2010 report prepared by Chemonics International Inc. for USAID said "Like in most African countries, governments cannot run business – so [there are] a lot of inefficiencies of high overheads [employing political friends with no required skills and attitude].") SODECO had a monopoly on curing (Note: Curing involves removal of the parchment, grading and bagging.) until 1995. As of 2010 SODECO had two curing factories, Songa in Gitega and Buterere in Bujumbura, with combined capacity of 60,000 tons per year. There were two private companies with curing factories, Sonicoff (Society of Nile Coffee) with a factory in Gitega, and Sivca (Société Industrielle de Valorisation du Café) with a factory in Ngozi. Sonicoff and Sivca had combined capacity of 10,000 tons per year. At this time, annual production was 20,000 to 30,000 tons per year.

In June 2009 the state issued a call for tenders, and in 2012 the SODECO plant in Gitega was sold to the Ugandan company KYOOGA–COPRODIV for US$2.8 million. SODECO was to grant severance and notice pay to 50 employees, and 25 would remain with the new company. By 2012 private mills had the capacity to process about half of the parchment coffee.

Between 1991 and 2019 the price paid to producers for cherry coffee did not change when adjusted for inflation. In 2019 the state increased its involvement in the coffee sector, with the Office de Développement du Café (ODECA) now coordinating all links in the sector. Producer prices were increased, but green coffee production fell from a record 25,000 tonnes in 2018 to 15,054 tonnes in 2020. Déo Guide Rurema, Minister of the Environment, Agriculture and Livestock, attributed the drop to climate change.

As of 2021 private individuals and cooperatives ran 173 pulping/washing stations, and ODECA managed 107. About 600,000 families, or 40% of the population, are coffee growers. Coffee processing is the main industry, and coffee is the largest export. Companies wholly or partially owned by the state that were reporting negative results in 2021 included Hôtel Source du Nil, Onatel, Cogerco, Tanganyika Mining Burundi, Regideso, Socabu and SODECO.

== See also ==
- List of companies of Burundi
- Economy of Burundi

== Sources ==
- Burundi Coffee Industry Value Chain Analysis (PDF), Chemonics International Inc., 5 June 2010
- Burundi. Diagnostic Trade Integration Study (DTIS) Update (PDF), vol. 2 - Annexes, July 2012
- "Burundi: SODECO (café) passe chez KYOOGA–COPRODIV (Ougandais)", AGnews (in French), 9 May 2012
- Inyabuntu, Florence (23 April 2021), "Deux ans après la nationalisation de la filière café, quel bilan ?", Burundi Eco (in French)
- Niyongabo, Jean Marie Vianney (7 January 2022), "L'Onatel, pourra-t-il ressusciter un jour ?", Burundi Eco (in French)
- P-5245-BU Memorandum and Recommendation of the President of the International Development Association ... Coffee Sector Project, International Development Association, 14 March 1990
- Reform of the Coffee Sector in Burundi: Prospects for Participation, Prosperity and Peace (PDF), International Alert, May 2007
