= Burundi Tea Office =

Public company supporting Burundi industry

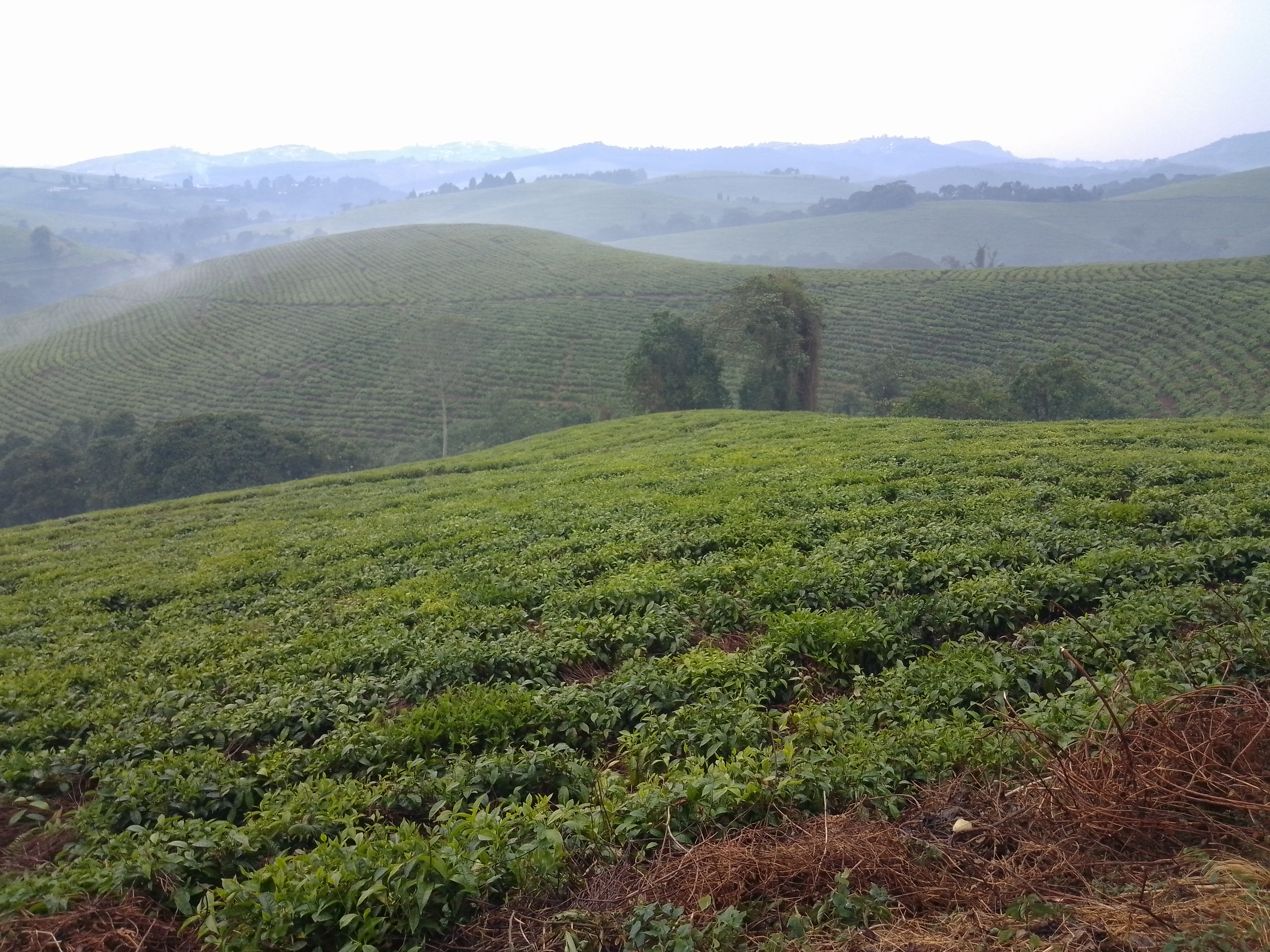
- Teza tea fields
- Trade name: OTB
- Native name: Office du Thé du Burundi
- Industry: Tea
- Founded: 1971; 55 years ago
- Headquarters: Av. Boulevard de l’UPRONA; BP: 2680; Bujumbura, Burundi
- Key people: Eng. Gilles Mukundwa, CEO
- Products: black tea, green tea, tea bags
- Owner: Government of Burundi
- OTB Headquarters (Burundi)
- Website: www.otb.co.bi

The Burundi Tea Office (Office du Thé du Burundi), or OTB, is a public company that supports the tea industry in Burundi.

== Background ==
Burundian tea is a high-altitude tea that has been cultivated since 1931 on the flanks of the high mountains of the Congo-Nile ridge. The tea gardens are planted at an altitude of 1,700 to 2,500 metres (5,600 to 8,200 ft). The favorable climate and environment support quality that is comparable to Indian teas. The excellent characteristics of high-altitude tea should place Burundian tea in the high end of the market, but unreliable quality and other factors makes it hard to reach that goal.

== Monopoly ==
The first tea cultivation trials in Burundi were set up at the Gisozi Agronomic Research Station in 1963. Large-scale tea growing was launched after Burundi gained independence in 1964. OTB was created as a public company in 1971 by presidential decree n° 1/79 of 07/30/1971. Its headquarters are in Bujumbura, and it now has five complexes in the provinces.

The OTB was expected to supplement the income of tea growers and contribute substantially to the country's foreign exchange. The extension of tea cultivation outside the research station was carried out in state-owned industrial block plantations, and "village tea plantations" in family plots. The first industrial block plantations, each with a tea factory, were:

Project	Area		Start date
Project	ha	acre	Start date
Teza	600	1,500	1963
Rwegura	800	2,000	1966
Tora	300	740	1969
OTB Buhoro	300	740	1987

Starting in 1969, high altitude tea plantations in the form of family plots were introduced in the regions surrounding the tea factories. These were:

Factory	Extension	Area		Start date
Factory	Extension	ha	acre	Start date
Teza	Muramvya / Banga	700	1,700	1969
Toro	Gisozi / Tora	700	1,700	1971
Rwegura	Remera	500	1,200	1974
Ijenda (new)	Ijenda	1,000	2,500	1974
OTB Buhoro	OTB Buhoro	500	1,200	1989

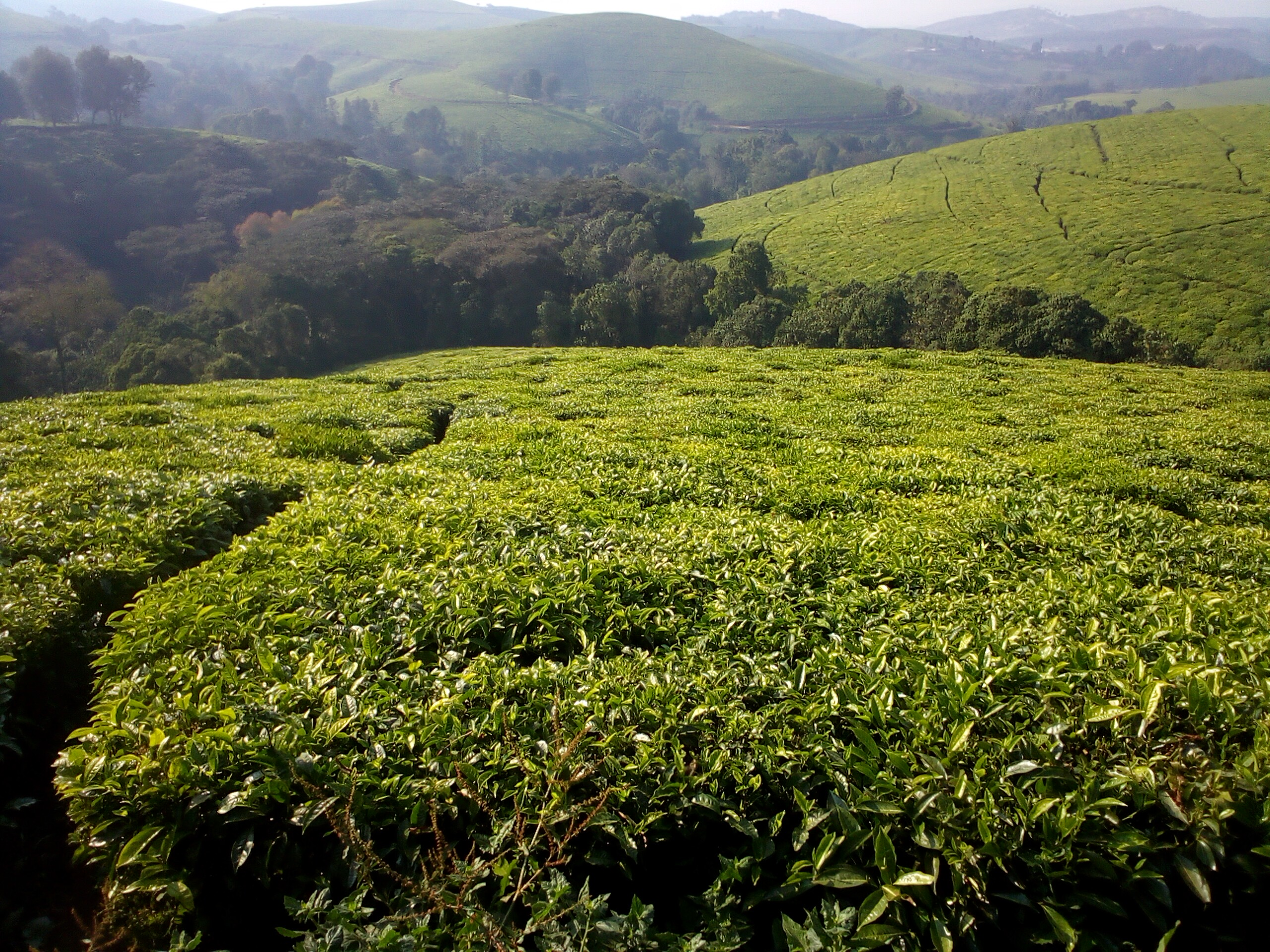
Tea fields around Kibira National Park

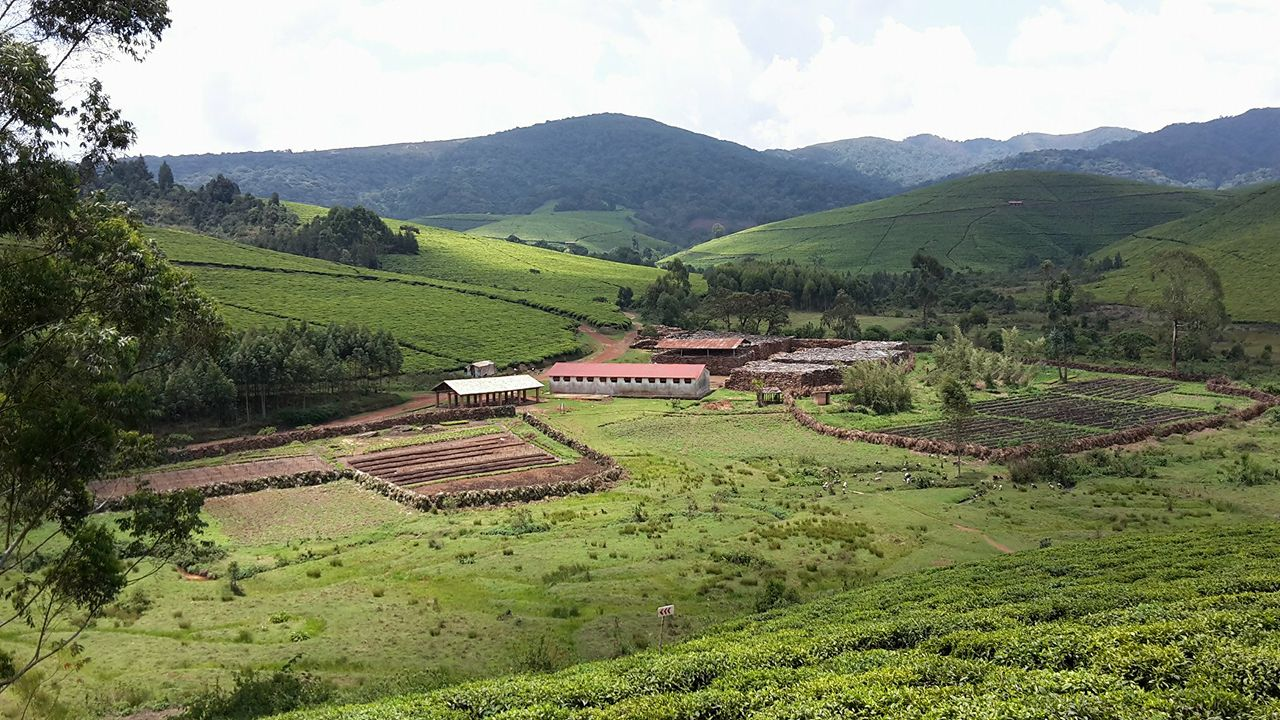
Teza-Muramvya

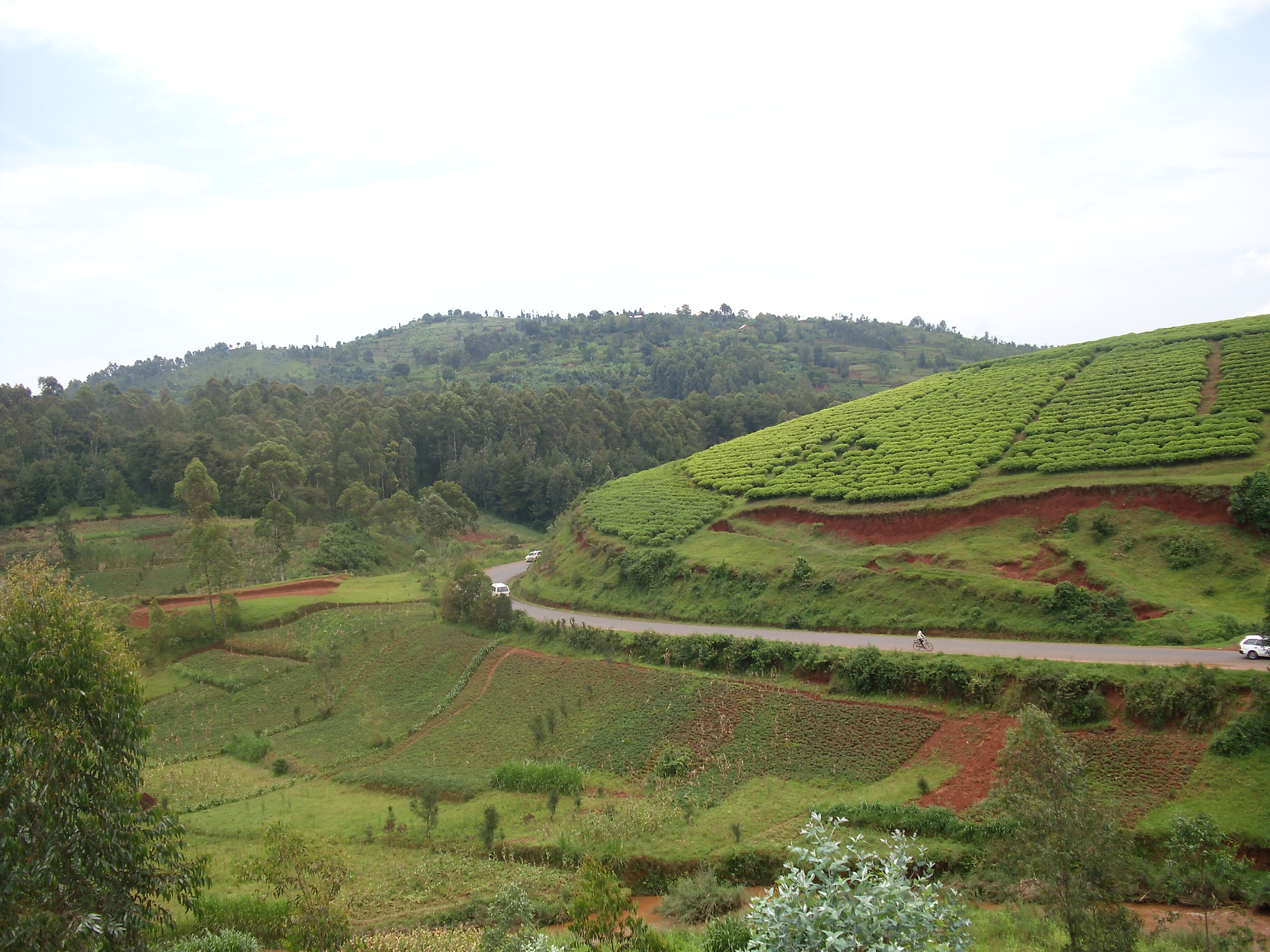
Mucece

The socio-political crisis that began in October 1993 caused a reduction in the area under production, especially in 1997. The Teza tea complex was the worst affected, with about 54 hectares (130 acres) of tea trees burned, and about 100 hectares (250 acres) growing wild due to lack of monitoring and maintenance.

Decree No. 100/157 of 5 September 1997 revised the terms under which the OTB was governed. As of 2002 OTB had 800 permanent employees at its headquarters. It also had a temporary workforce supplying about eight million man-days per year, equivalent to about 4,000 full-time workers, but only employed seasonally. Burundi Institute of Agricultural Sciences (ISABU) supported OTB with research.

By 2006 there were 2,010 hectares (5,000 acres) of industrial block plantation and 6,921 hectares (17,100 acres) of village plantations. In 2011, OTB still had a monopoly on tea production in Burundi. It controlled 9,005 tea plantations, both state-owned and family owned, distributed in five tea regions. From north to south these were Buhoro, Rwegura, Teza, Ijenda and Tora. OTB bought green leaves from the tea growers, processed it into black tea, and sold the product to markets around the world. Tea cultivation provided regular monetary income to about 350,000 people in 2011.

== Competition ==
A new private company, Promotion du Thé de Mwaro (PROTHEM), started operations in 2011 with some difficulty. After PROTHEM arrived the price per kilo paid to growers was raised from 180 BIF to 250 BIF. Law no.1/20 of 28 September 2013 said the state would transfer all or part of its interests in a named group of companies with state participation, including OTB. The approach to privatization would be decided on a case-by-case basis.

In July 2014 Ernest Mberamiheto, Minister of Good Governance and Privatization, answered questions in a National Assembly debate. Companies that had been recommended for privatization over a five-year period included SOSUMO, (Note: SOSUMO: Société Sucrière du Moso (Moso Sugar Company)) SIP, (Note: SIP: Société Immobilière Publique (Public Real Estate Company)) SRDI, (Note: SRDI: Société Régionale de Développement de l'Imbo (Imbo Regional Development Company)) OTB, (Note: OTB: Office du Thé du Burundi (Burundi Tea Office)) ALM, (Note: ALM: Agence de Location du Matériel (Equipment Rental Agency)) COGERCO, (Note: COGERCO: Compagnie de Gérance du Coton (Cotton Management Company)) LNBTP (Note: LNBTP: Laboratoire Nationale du Bâtiment et des Travaux Publics (National Laboratory of Building and Public Works)) and ONATOUR. (Note: ONATOUR: Office National de la Tourbe (National Peat Office)) It was recommended that measures be put in place to prevent the assets of these companies being abused in the interim before privatization occurred.

In 2009 the five centers produced 6,729,023 kilograms (14,834,956 lb) of dry tea. This had risen to 10,761,613 kilograms (23,725,295 lb) of dry tea by 2018. In 2020 there were 66,487 tea growers, of whom 15,790 had formed production cooperatives. The OTB in 2022 faced competition from the new company Promotion du Thé de Mwaro (PROTHEM), which OTB accused of sourcing tea from the village producers that it supports. More tea companies were being started, but there was no regulatory body for the industry. Power cuts due to fuel shortages were also an issue.

OTB and PROTHEM of Gisozi met in February 2020 to try to sort out their differences. OTB accused PROTHEM of picking green leaf in the Commune of Rusaka, where it did not have its own plantations. OTB had invested in buying the plants, and providing chemical fertilizer, road maintenance and supervision of tea growers, who in return sold to OTB. PROTHEM said it did have plantations in the locality. It was founded in line with the government's program to attract local and foreign investors, and the administration should let the factory collect tea from tea growers to whom they had given plants.

Tea production depends on the weather. It decreased by 8.5% in July 2021 compared to the previous year due to poor rainfall, but increased by 35.8% in August 2022 compared to the previous year due to good rainfall. Another factor for a gradual long-term decline is that tea growers were not being paid enough and are abandoning their fields, or substituting other crops. The price per kilo was 250 BIF in 2012, and only increased to 280 BIF in 2021.

== See also ==
- List of companies of Burundi
- Economy of Burundi

== Sources ==
- Historique (in French), OTB
- Loi No1/20 du 28 septembre 2013 (PDF) (in French), Cabinet of the President
- Ndaribaze, Jean Marie (27 February 2020), "L'Office du Thé du Burundi (OTB) et l'usine du thé de Gisozi PROTHEM se rencontre pour s'entendre sur certains points", Radio Télévision Nationale du Burundi (in French)
- Ndayisaba, Éric (2016), La région théicole d'Ijenda (Burundi) : économie et société, 1965-2011. (PDF) (in French), HAL
- Ndikumana, Jonathan (29 April 2022), "L'OTB en quête d'extension malgré les embûches", Burundi Eco (in French)
- Niyibigira, Aline (3 June 2023), "Le thé du Burundi serait-il en voie de régression ?", Burundi Eco (in French)
- Nkunzimana, T.; Thonon, A.; Ndimira, P.-F. (2002), "La théiculture au Burundi: Diagnostic d'une filière en mutation" (PDF), Topicultura (in French), 20 (4): 193–197
- Questions orales avec débat adressées au Ministre de la Bonne Gouvernance et la Privatisation (in French), National Assembly, July 2014
- Renforcement des capacités commerciales de la filière thé (in French), AFD, 13 December 2011
