= Coopératives d'Épargne et de Crédit (Burundi) =

Burundi Savings and Credit Cooperatives
- Coopératives d’Epargne et de Crédit
- Abbreviation: COOPEC
- Formation: 20 March 1984; 42 years ago
- Type: Cooperatives
- Purpose: Savings and loans
- Region served: Burundi
- Services: Savings and loans
- Official languages: Kirundi, French
- Main organ: FENACOBU (Fédération Nationale des COOPEC du Burundi)
- Website: fenacobu.bi

Coopératives d'Épargne et de Crédit (Savings and Credit Cooperatives), or COOPECs, are microfinance savings and loans cooperatives serving low income people in Burundi. FENACOBU is the umbrella organization for the cooperatives.

== Background ==
There were systems to mobilize peasant savings in Burundi before 1980, but they were ineffective. In 1981 the Burundian Ministry of Communal Development approached the Centre International du Crédit Mutuel (CICM) of France to request assistance in establishing and developing a Mutual Credit system in Burundi. The CICM began work in Burundi in 1981 and 1982 to enable the formation of rural savings and loans cooperatives (COOPECs).

On 20 March 1984 agreement No. 283/C/DPL/83/BUR was signed between the Government of Burundi, the French Ministry of Cooperation and the CICM. The COOPEC Central Office was established to lead the process of setting up COOPECs. Four financing agreements totalling 20,300,000 French Francs were signed between Burundi and the Coopération Française.

== History ==
On 14 May 1984 the first COOPEC was founded in the Mungwa zone of the Commune of Gitega, Gitega Province. Melchior Ndadaye, the future President of Burundi, directed the Coopératives d'Épargne et de Crédit in Gitega from 1986 until 1988. In 1989 he returned to Bujumbura and became head of Meridien Bank Burundi's credit service. He remained at Meridien Bank until he was elected president in 1993. Between 1985 and 2005 the network of COOPECs progressively expanded throughout Burundi.

The Government of Burundi withdrew financial support in 1992 but continued to provide the premises housing the COOPECs. After the Burundian Civil War started in 1993 some COOPECs were vandalized and had to shut down. Staff members left and paper records were destroyed in offices that had not been computerized. Until 1996, the COOPECs received technical support from the CICM. The CICM left hastily that year and were replaced by new management. There was conflict between the staff and the new managers.

FENACOBU (Fédération Nationale des COOPEC du Burundi, National Federation of COOPECs of Burundi) was created in 1997 as the umbrella structure of the network. Its purpose was the ensure proper management of existing and future COOPECs. The Board of Directors did not appoint the managers of FENACOBU until 1998. Decree No. 100/203 of 22/7/2006 regulated microfinance activities in Burundi. To meet the requirements of that decree for itself and the affiliated COOPECs, FENACOBU applied for approval from the Bank of the Republic of Burundi (BRB), which it obtained on 1 March 2007.

In June 2023, all 5,000 and 10,000 BIF notes were withdrawn from circulation. This caused immense harm to people who kept their money at home instead of in a bank or a microfinance institution such as a COOPEC. Other microfinance institutions include Caisse Coopérative d'Epargne et de Crédit Mutuel (CECM) and Coopérative Solidarité avec les Paysans pour l’Epargne et le Crédit à Cibitoke (COSPEC).

== Activities ==
A COOPEC is a non-profit collective whose primary purpose is to collect the savings of its members and grant them loans. The members are co-owners and participate in decision-making. The members work in a cooperative manner to collect savings and grant credits to low-income populations who cannot access the mainstream banking system. COOPECs only distribute credits after several months of prior savings. The reasons for this rule are that the COOPECs must have capital against which they can grant credit without resorting to external financing, and building up savings is seen as a process for members to learn how to handle money.

COOPECs differ from traditional banks who offer competitive financial services while maximising return to shareholders. COOPECs must cover their operating costs, but otherwise provide financial services to members under the best conditions. One weakness is that the savings often exceed the amount needed to cover loans. The COOPECs deposit excess liquidity in the banks, in effect transferring resources from poor rural communities to more prosperous cities.

Starting on 12 October 2016 the COOPECs were interconnected through a service run by FENACOBU. Members of all COOPECs can make deposits and withdrawals at any FENACOBU service point. Products and services include current accounts, term deposit accounts, savings plans, tontine savings, solidarity savings and credit products. Credit products include overdrafts, express credit, agricultural credit, school credit, solidarity credit, employee credit, ordinary credit, automatic credit, warrantage credit and harvest credit. Other services provided include domiciliation of salaries and pension annuities, and transfer from account to account.

== Sources ==
- "A Hutu for president in Burundi" (PDF), AFP, 3 June 1993
- Akyeampong, Emmanuel Kwaku; Gates, Henry Louis, eds. (2012), Dictionary of African Biography, vol. 4, Oxford University Press USA, ISBN 9780195382075
- "Fédération Nationale des COOPEC du Burundi", Esoko (in French)
- "FENACOBU-MF", Menya (in French), 2 June 2022
- Historique (in French), FENACOBU
- "Les coopératives d'épargne sont d'une importance capitale", ABP (in French), 15 January 2024
- Niyongabo, Ephrem (2007), La recherche de pérennité par les institutions de microfinance au Burundi. Trois études de cas... (PDF)
