= ISABU =

Burundi Institute of Agricultural Sciences
- Trade name: ISABU
- Native name: Institut des Sciences Agronomiques du Burundi
- Founded: 22 June 1962; 64 years ago in Bujumbura, Burundi
- Headquarters: Bujumbura, Burundi
- Isabu Headquarters (Burundi)
- Website: isabu.bi

The Burundi Institute of Agricultural Sciences (French: Institut des Sciences Agronomiques du Burundi, ISABU) is an agricultural research institute in Burundi..

== Foundation ==
ISABU is a public institution supervised by the Ministry of Environment, Agriculture and Livestock. It was created by Legislative Ordinance No. B7/11 of June 22, 1962. Its governance is defined by this decree and Decree-Law No. 1/123 of July 25, 1988 concerning organic regulations of public establishments in Burundi. It undertakes agricultural research to provide high-performance animal and plant material, and supporting technologies, to farmers in Burundi.

== History ==
In December 1975 a loan to Burundi from the International Development Association was arranged for a second coffee improvement project. ISABU was to carry out a coffee research program and field trials, and OCIBU the rest of the project.

In December 2019 the sugar company SOSUMO validated a study by experts from ISABU that recommended using new techniques and types of fertilizer to boost production. The authors noted that the existing system had been unchanged for thirty years. SOSUMO agreed to now use organic fertiliser produced by FOMI, which would reduce costs, including foreign currency costs.

In November 2021 it was reported that excessive use of FOMI fertilizers might cause soil degradation. Despite expert advice, both Déo Guide Rurema, Minister of Agriculture and Alfred Niyokwishimira, general director of ISABU, chose not to change the recommended quantities. Radio Inzamba reported that the reason was that they had fallen out with Adrien Ntigacika, who was planning to build a cement factory on ISABU land in Rutana Province.

== Sources ==
- A propos de l'ISABU (in French), ISABU
- Development Credit Agreement (Second Coffee Improvement Project) (PDF), International Development Association, 5 December 1975
- Gakiza, Dorine (5 December 2019), "SOSUMO : bientôt, des changements dans la culture de la canne à sucre", Burundi Forum (in French)
- "Un bras de fer qui risque de plonger l'agriculture dans l'abîme", Radio Inzamba (in French), 16 November 2021
