= Commune of Gisozi =

Coordinates: 3°34′16″S 29°40′41″E

- Commune
- Interactive map of Commune of Gisozi
- Country: Burundi
- Province: Mwaro Province
- Administrative center: Gisozi
- Time zone: UTC+2 (Central Africa Time)

The commune of Gisozi is a commune of Mwaro Province in central Burundi. The capital lies at Gisozi.
