= Public Real Estate Company =

- Trade name: SIP
- Native name: Société Immobilière Publique
- Founded: 7 May 1979
- Defunct: 24 May 2019
- Successor: OBUHA
- Owner: Government of Burundi

The Public Real Estate Company (Société Immobilière Publique), or SIP, was a state-owned company that developed serviced plots and built housing for civil servants and managers in Burundi.

== History ==
SIP was created by Decree No. 100/69 of 7 May 1979. The state ended its formula of free housing for civil servants. SIP immediately began to develop new neighborhoods for senior civil servants, excluding private sector agents and other lower categories of the Civil Service. The state subsidized the interest on loans for first housing granted to its executives and agents by 100%, and covered 20% of the capital (capped at 3,600,000 BIF or about US$3,600 at the time).

A report prepared by Coopers & Lybrand in July 1984 discussed problems with financial management at SIP. It noted that most homes were sold to civil servants on 15-year installment plans, with interest charges covered by the state. The installment payments were withheld from the civil servants' pay, but there were unpredictable delays before they were forwarded to SIP, which was forced to take out loans to pay for its construction programs, and sometimes to delay payments on these loans. The report recommended development of a computerized accounting system that would let SIP managers compare financial forecasts under different scenarios.

In 1986 Burundi revised its housing policy when it entered the Structural Adjustment Program, where the Breton Woods Institutions subjected the state to strict budgetary management rigor. Subsidies of house prices and interest rates were ended. The state now only provided an endorsement and guarantee of 20-year mortgage loans. In 1989 the Urban Housing Promotion Fund (Fonds de Promotion de l’Habitat Urbain, FPHU) was created as a joint venture to support the government's policy on urban housing. It provided credit to SIP and the Encadrement des Constructions Sociales et Aménagement des Terrains (ECOSAT) to finance housing operations and real estate investments.

After a reform in 1991, SIP continued to develop land and build for senior and middle managers, while ECOSAT developed land and built houses for lower income public and private sector employees. Due to the lack of land reserves, their activities were carried out in fits and starts.

In July 2014 Ernest Mberamiheto, Minister of Good Governance and Privatization, answered questions in a National Assembly debate. Companies that had been recommended for privatization over a five-year period included SOSUMO (Note: SOSUMO: Société Sucrière du Moso (Moso Sugar Company)), SIP (Note: SIP: Société Immobilière Publique (Public Real Estate Company)), SRDI (Note: SRDI: Société Régionale de Développement de l'Imbo (Imbo Regional Development Company)), OTB (Note: OTB: Office du Thé du Burundi (Burundi Tea Office)), ALM (Note: ALM: Agence de Location du Matériel (Equipment Rental Agency)), COGERCO (Note: COGERCO: Compagnie de Gérance du Coton (Cotton Management Company)), LNBTP (Note: LNBTP: Laboratoire Nationale du Bâtiment et des Travaux Publics (National Laboratory of Building and Public Works)) and ONATOUR (Note: ONATOUR: Office National de la Tourbe (National Peat Office)). It was recommended that measures be put in place to prevent the assets of these companies being abused in the interim before privatization occurred.

As of 2017 SIP and ECOSAT were experiencing serious financial difficulties. SIP had very few human, technical or financial resources, and mainly just produced serviced plots for better-off people. In the previous twenty years it had produced 4,340 serviced plots in Bujumbura and a few other urban centers, a small quantity given the pace of urban growth in Burundi.

The Office Burundais de l'Urbanisme, de l’Habitat et de la construction (OBUHA) was created by decree n°100/079 of 24 May 2019 by merging six existing institutions:

- Public Real Estate Company (Société Immobilière Publique, SIP)
- Supervision of Social Construction and Land Development (Encadrement des Constructions Sociales et Aménagement des Terrains, ECOSAT)
- National Laboratory for Building and Public Works (Laboratoire National du Bâtiment et des Travaux Publics, LNBTP)
- Municipal Technical Services Authority (Régie des Services Techniques Municipaux, SETEMU)
- General Directorate of Building (Direction Générale du Bâtiment, DGB)
- General Directorate of Urban Planning and Housing (Direction Générale de l’Urbanisme et de l’Habitat, DGUH).

== See also ==
- List of companies of Burundi
- Economy of Burundi

== Sources ==
- Decret No 100/135 du 30 Juin 2016 (PDF) (in French), Burundi
- Kuriyo, Benjamin (23 August 2019), "Le Fonds de Promotion de l'Habitat Urbain décentralise ses services", Burundi Eco (in French)
- Maniragaba, Mélance (24 July 2020), "Premier logement : des recours qui ne tiennent pas la route", Burundi Eco (in French)
- Nindorera, Louis-Marie (September 2017), La Gouvernance foncière au Burundi (PDF) (in French), Bujumbura: World Bank
- No 204.02.17/1126/RE/2017 (PDF), UN High Commission on Human Rights, 13 December 2017
- OBUHA (in French), Programme Solidarité Eau
- "Office Burundais de l'urbanisme, de l'[...]", Esoko (in French)
- Questions orales avec débat adressées au Ministre de la Bonne Gouvernance et la Privatisation (in French), National Assembly, July 2014
- SIP Plan for the improvement of the financial management (PDF), Coopers & Lybrand], July 1984, archived from the original (PDF) on February 15, 2017
