= Caisse Coopérative d'Epargne et de Crédit Mutuel =

Cooperative Savings and Mutual Credit Fund
- Caisse Coopérative d'Epargne et de Crédit Mutuel
- Tuziganye, Turonke ingurane

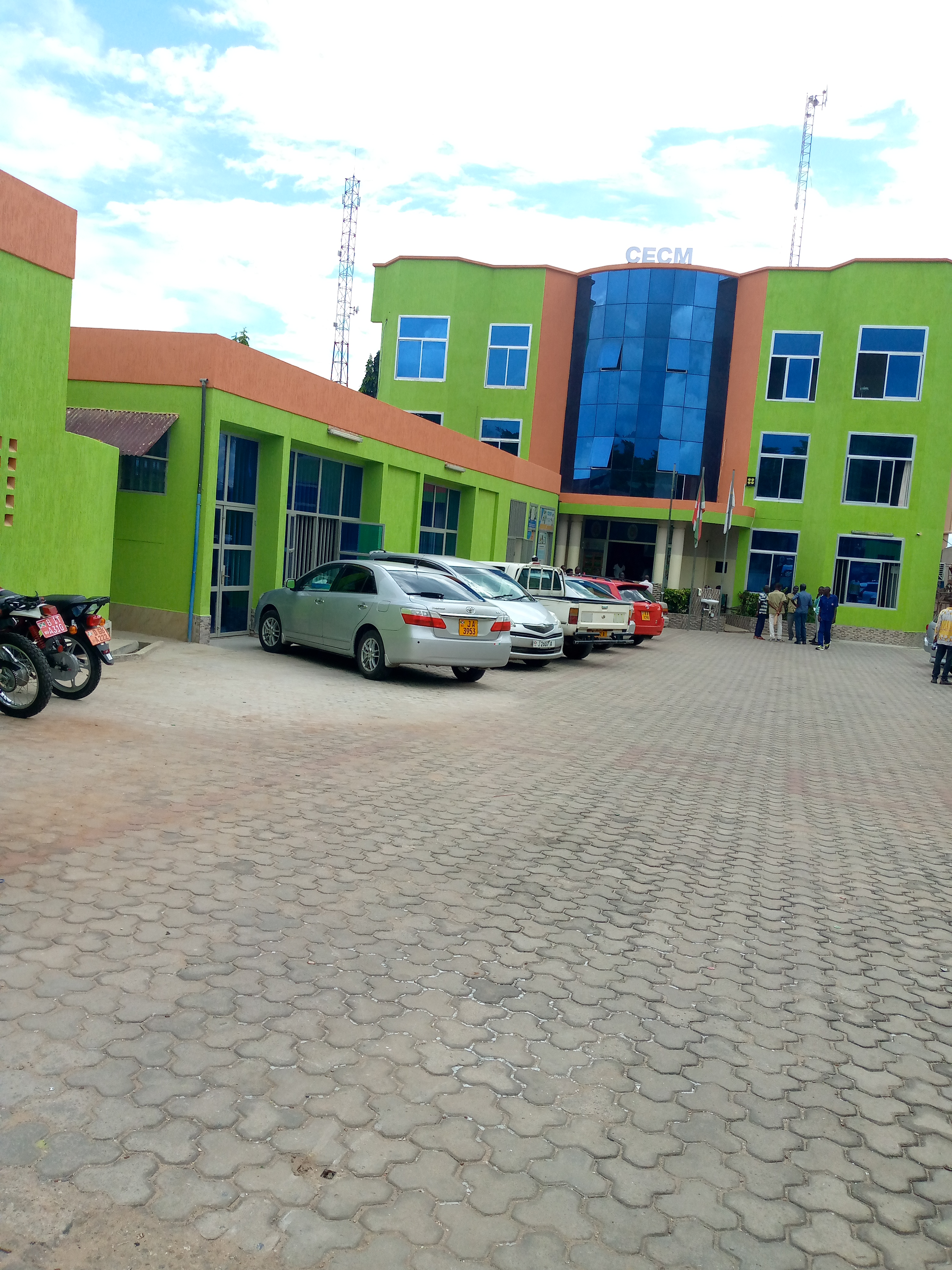
- CECM head office in Bujumbura

- Location within Burundi
- Abbreviation: CECM
- Formation: 4 September 1995; 30 years ago
- Purpose: Savings and loans
- Headquarters: 10 Avenue de la RDC, Bujumbura
- Coordinates: 3.38207°S 29.36793°E
- Region served: Burundi
- Services: Savings and loans
- Official languages: Kirundi, French
- Key people: Claudette Nyandwi, Chairperson; Marie Louise Nsabiyumva, CEO
- Website: cecm.bi

Caisse Coopérative d'Epargne et de Crédit Mutuel (Cooperative Savings and Mutual Credit Fund), or CECM, is a microfinance savings and loans bank serving low income people in Burundi.

== History ==
The CECM was initiated in 1995 by the "Association pour la Promotion Economique de la Femmes" (APEF: Association for Economic Promotion of Women). It was approved by ministerial order no. 550/313/1995 of 4 September 1995. At first, CECM received funding from the Canadian NGO "Développement international Desjardins" (DID), but DID withdrew from Burundi in March 1996. CECM merged with the APEF in 1999.

By the end of 2003, CECM had 16,876 members, 75% women and 25% men. CECM had opened two agencies, one next to Bujumbura Central Market and the other in Buyenzi. The organization was planning agencies in other peripheral districts of Bujumbura Mairie. As of 2007, priority was given to low-income women from the outlying districts of the city of Bujumbura. It operated mainly in Bujumbura Mairie and its outskirts, and did not have an agency in the interior.

Decree law no. 100/203 of 22 July 2006 regulated microfinance activities in Burundi. CECM was approved as a Cooperative Savings and Mutual Credit Fund by the Bank of the Republic of Burundi (BRB) on 29 December 2006. Under new regulations, microfinance institutions with mutualist principles belong to the 3rd category. The CECM was approved as such by letter no. D1/1092/2019 of 11 June 2019 from the Central Bank. Other microfinance institutions include Coopératives d'Épargne et de Crédit (COOPECs) and Coopérative Solidarité avec les Paysans pour l’Epargne et le Crédit à Cibitoke (COSPEC).

As of 2022 CECM had 64 billion BIF in deposits and 62 billion BIF in outstanding credits. CECM had 179 executives and agents operating in 12 agencies across Burundi. On 16 December 2022 CECM launched a new product called "CECM Ni Akaravyo". This would let members access their account through a mobile phone to make withdrawals, payments and transfers, view history and purchase units. Money in their account could be transferred to ecocash or lumicash. Point of Sale (POS) machines were being installed around the country using Econet and Lumitel SIM cards. The POS machines would use fingerprints for identification, and give receipts for each transaction.

== Objectives ==
The main objectives of the CECM are:

- Encourage individual savings efforts, especially among women
- Mobilize members' resources and grant credits to finance activities that help combat poverty;
- Promote accessible and appropriate financial and non-financial services such as technical advice and management training.

The CECM is aimed at anyone, female or male who has difficulty accessing the mainstream financial system.

The basic principle is to save before borrowing. Shares cost 4,000 BIF, with a maximum of five shares. The membership fee is 800 BIF. The CECM offers three types of savings product: sight savings, term savings and savings set aside to finance a specific activity. The rate of return on savings varies depending on the term. Loans are released through customers' accounts, and paid interest of 18% as of 2007. The loan guarantee depends on the type of credit and the amount. CECM uses four recovery methods: warning telephone call, interview visit, formal recovery letter and finally implementation of guarantees.

A 2012 report prepared for USAID described CECM as well structured and functional, with over 20,000 members of whom 80% were women. It was providing credit to small farmers, particularly to women (70%), in sectors such as rice, vegetables, beans and fruit but not coffee. CECM usually provided credit to small groups of women rather than to individuals. To access credit women had to open a savings account and be a member of the bank for at least six months. The amount given vary from 100,000 to 200,000 BIF. The interest rate was 8%, low compared to other banks, but CECM did not give loans with terms over nine months, The bank also provided training in capacity building, business management, and health related issues.

== Finances ==
The demand for credits exceeds the amount saved by members. The gap between the rate of growth of savings and credit is small, which implies excess demand for credit within the institution. CECM uses external donors to meet the demand, and has always received support from international NGOs such as Oxfam Quebec, Catholic Relief Service, United Nations Development Programme and NOVIB.

CECM has an important agreement with the non-profit association Twitezimbere. It includes a guarantee fund, that includes loans from Twitezimbere related to income-generating activities. CECM is responsible for monitoring and recovery of credits, but collaborates with Twitezimbere if there are repayment difficulties. The agreement also concerns lines of credit or cash loans using funds from Twitezimbere when CECM does not have enough.

== See also ==
- List of companies of Burundi
- Economy of Burundi

== Sources ==
- "CECM Ni Akaravyo : Un nouveau né dans le domaine des services financiers numériques", Journal Burundi Eco, 24 December 2022
- Historique (in French), CECM
- Ndayirukiye, Albéric (27 April 2022), "Agir pour les femmes avec la CECM : 25 ans après", Akeza (in French)
- Niyongabo, Ephrem (2007), La recherche de pérennité par les institutions de microfinance au Burundi. Trois études de cas... (PDF)
- Weidemann Associates, Inc. (October 2012), Burundi Gender Assessment Final Report (PDF), USAID, archived from the original (PDF) on February 3, 2017
