= Office National de la Tourbe =

Mining company in Burundi

- Trade name: ONATOUR
- Native name: Office Nationale de la Tourbe
- Industry: Peat mining and processing
- Founded: 1977; 49 years ago
- Headquarters: Burundi
- Bujumbura (Burundi)
- Website: http://www.onatour.bi/

Office National de la Tourbe, or ONATOUR is a publicly owned enterprise that mines and processes peat in Burundi. It produces peat briquette from the mined peat. It was created by decree on 21 March 1977 with the mission of promoting and marketing peat and its derivatives to industry and agriculture.

== Locations ==
As of 2018 peat reserves in Burundi were estimated at 150 million tonnes, of which 57 million tonnes could profitably be exploited. In 2021 ONATOUR was exploiting five sites:

Site	Commune	Province	Reserves tonnes	Approx coords
Gashiru	Mugongo-Manga	Bujumbura Rural		3.4042°S 29.5486°E
Ruyange	Gisozi	Mwaro		3.58784°S 29.68213°E
Kidimbagu	Matana	Bururi	170,000	3.74863°S 29.6890°E
Gitanga	Matana; Ryansoro	Bururi; Gitega	57,000	3.72048°S 29.80664°E
Buyongwe	Kiremba; Nyamurenza commune of Marangara	Ngozi	20,000	2.72816°S 29.91567°E

Other peat swamps include Ndurumu, Nyavyamo and Nyamuswaga.

== Production process ==
Production is limited to the dry season, from July to September. The marshes must be channeled and drained dry so machines can work without getting bogged down. Peat gradually deteriorates over time, so ONATOUR produces based on demand. It could produce 20,000 to 30,000 tonnes per year, but as of 2021 actually produced 10,000 to 15,000 tonnes of peat. Apart from the army, which consumes about 10,000 tonnes per year, customers include the national police, BUCECO, FOMI and other companies.

Natural peat smokes while burning, so is not good for indoor coooking. ONATOUR has produced about a hundred tonnes of peat briquettes, but these still produce sojme smoke. In 2021 ONATOUR was carbonizing the briquettes to make them smoke-free. This product promised to be an affordable alternative to wood, and would help reduce deforestation.

== History ==
=== Early years ===
The State-owned Office Nationale de la Tourbe (ONATOUR) is Burundi's only peat producer. ONATOUR was created by decree on 21 March 1977 with the mission of promoting and marketing peat and its derivatives to industry and agriculture.

USAID provided support to ONATOUR in developing the peat business starting in 1978. The priority would be to serve urban householders, replacing charcoal. A follow-up project was authorized in August 1980, with the goal of conserving Burundi's rapidly shrinking forest reserves by using peat as an alternative to wood, and to strengthen ONATOUR's capacity to efficiently undertake planned operations.

In 1988 the company initiated a project to make soil fertilizer using peat mixed with manure and a few chemicals. Similar projects were underway in other peat-producing countries, including Ireland, Germany, Russia, Indonesia and Malaysia. The project was interrupted by the outbreak of civil war in October 1993.

Between 1997 and 1998 ONATOUR's production suffered from shortages of fuel oil and spare parts. Production increased in 1999 to 20,000 tonnes before falling in 2000 and 2001. The domestic market could absorb only 12,000 tonnes per year. Onatour produced 9,764 tons in 2009–2010, 13,111 tons in 2010–2011, 7,942 tons in 2011–2012, 20,335 tons in 2012–2013, and 19,256 tons in 2013–2014.

== Postwar ==
After the civil was, the military camps were the main source of demand, although they stopped ordering peat in 2013 with giving any reason. They buy peat because they cannot find enough firewood to meet their needs. Onatour used to supply peat to universities, prisons and boarding schools, but in 2009 Onatour was unable to supply these customers, so they cancelled their subscriptions. As of 2014 the company had increased its capacity by adding four new machines to the six old ones, and had installed a 20MW power plant that was powered by peat. Onatour had four trucks to distribute peat, but two had broken down, so the company had to hire private vehicles.

In 2016 ONATOUR's only customer was the Ministry of National Defense and Veterans Affairs (MDNAC). This customer had heavy arrears of overdue debt owed to ONATOUR. ONATOUR wanted to win back former customers by improving peat quality and increasing the number of trucks to transport the fuel. It was also looking for a machine to convert peat into briquettes, a process to convert peat to coal, and the agrihaute project to produce peat-based fertilizers.

In the years leading up to 2019 ONATOUR's production was mostly consumed by the Burundian military. Between 2015 and 2019 annual production of peat increased from 3,967 tonnes to 18,330 tonnes. Production was 11,800 tonnes 2018–2019, 15,248 tonnes 2019 –2020, 9,111 tonnes 2020–2021 and 12,955 tonnes 2021–2022. In 2019 the Gitanga Mine produced 7,529 tonnes; the Gisozi Mine, 4,247 tonnes; the Buyongwe Mine, 3,466 tonnes; and the Matana Mine, 3,088 tonnes.

In 2022 FOMI and BUCECO were buying small quantities of peat. A study on production of carbonized peat-based briquettes was completed in December 2021. The briquettes do not give off smoke, and are designed for household use as an alternative to charcoal. ONATOUR planned to obtain a machine to manufacture the briquettes, and expected no problem meeting demand given Burundi's large peat reserves.

In May 2024, Audace Niyonzima, Minister of Finance, Budget and Economic Planning, reported to the Senate on dividends paid by public and mixed enterprises. He noted that some public companies had never paid their dividends, including Onatel (National Telecommunications Office), Camebu (Central Medical Purchasing Agency), Cogerco (Cotton Management Company), Loterie Nationale du Burundi (Lona), Onatour, Otraco (Public Transport Office) and the Hôtel Source du Nil. Some had recorded negative results, and others had not taken the required steps to calculate dividends.

== See also ==
- List of companies of Burundi
- Mining industry of Burundi

== Sources ==
- Igiraneza, Jules Bercy (24 May 2024), "Les dividendes des entreprises publiques en débat au Sénat", Iwacu (in French)
- Madirisha, Edouard (6 June 2014), "Il faut moderniser l'Onatour !", Iwacu (in French)
- Niyongabo, Jean Marie Vianney (18 February 2022), "ONATOUR : Vers la production des briquettes carbonisées", Burundi Eco (in French)
- Nkurunziza, Gilbert (17 December 2021), "La vulgarisation de la tourbe : un antidote à la déforestation ?", Burundi Eco (in French)
- Ntibarikure, Mathias (12 May 2016), "L'ONATOUR au bord de la faillite", Burundi Eco (in French)
- Project Assistance Completion Report: Alternative Energy (Peat) Project (695-0103) (PDF), USAID, April 1990, archived from the original (PDF) on February 15, 2017
- Yager, Thomas R. (2001), The Mineral Industries of Burundi, Comoros, Malawi, Mauritius, Reunion, Rwanda, and Seychelles (PDF), USGS
- Yager, Thomas R. (2019), The Mineral Industry of Burundi (PDF), USGS
- Yishuang Liu; Gao Ke (1 December 2018), "Le Burundi va renforcer le recours aux "expériences étrangères" sur l'intégration de la tourbe dans la fertilisation du sol", Xinhua (in French)
