= Déo-Guide Rurema =

Ministers in Burundi

Déo-Guide Rurema (born 1967) is a Burundian politician serving as the Minister of the Environment, Agriculture and Livestock. He was appointed in June 2020 by President Évariste Ndayishimiye.

== Background and education ==
Rurema was born in 1967 in Murata, Kayanza Province in Burundi. He earned a Doctorate Degree in Agronomic Sciences from the University of Abomey-Calavi, Benin Republic.

== Career ==
Rurema began his career with the International Institute of Tropical Agriculture in the University of Abomey-Calavi, Benin Republic where he earned the position of Researcher-Doctorate and Research Associate. During that same period, he was a Professor in the University of Burundi and also Director of the Research Centre in Agriculture and Rural Development and Coordinator of the Partnership Project between United States Agency for International Development, University of Ngozi and the University of North Carolina. Rurema also occupied other positions related to his profession.
