= Burundian unrest (2015–2018) =

Period of unrest in Burundi

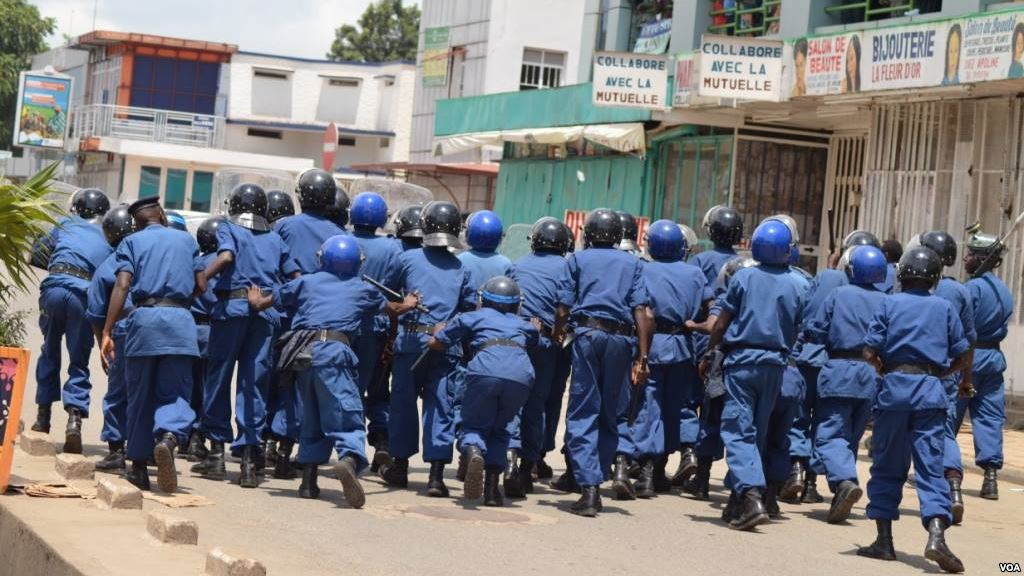
- Date: 26 April 2015 – 2018
- Location: Bujumbura, Burundi
- Caused by: Proposal to allow the country's president, Pierre Nkurunziza, to run for a third term in office
- Methods: Protests; Demonstrations; Government crackdown
- Status: At least 600 protesters arrested and 200,000 refugees; 13 May attempted military coup; Protests continue in Bujumbura; Low-level insurgency in border areas
- Result: Pierre Nkurunziza decides not to seek a fourth term in 2018

Parties
Burundian opposition; FNL; Student protesters; Opposition protesters; Republican Forces of Burundi (Forebu); RED-Tabara; FRODEBU (limited involvement); Faction of the Burundian military (2015 only)	(Burundi) Burundian government; CNDD-FDD; National Police; National Intelligence Service

Lead figures
Agathon Rwasa Godefroid Niyombare; Cyrille Ndayirukiye	President Pierre Nkurunziza; Adolphe Nshimirimana †

Casualties
- Deaths: Estimated 1,700 civilians killed 390,000 civilians fled into exile

On 25 April 2015, the ruling political party in Burundi, the National Council for the Defense of Democracy – Forces for the Defense of Democracy (CNDD-FDD), announced that the incumbent President of Burundi, Pierre Nkurunziza, would run for a third term in the 2015 presidential election. The announcement sparked protests by those opposed to Nkurunziza seeking a third term in office.

Widespread demonstrations in the then-capital, Bujumbura, lasted for over three weeks. During that time the country's highest court approved Nkurunziza's right to run for a third term in office despite the fact that at least one of the court's judges fled the country claiming he had received death threats from members of the government. As a result of the protests the government also shut down the country's internet and telephone network, closed all of the country's universities and government officials publicly referred to the protesters as "terrorists". In April, tens of thousands of people fled the country, hundreds of people were arrested and several protesters and police officers were killed while dozens more were injured.

On 13 May 2015, a coup was announced, led by Major General Godefroid Niyombare, while President Nkurunziza was in Tanzania attending an emergency conference about the situation in the country. By the next day the coup collapsed and government forces reasserted control. On 11 December, almost 90 people were killed in attacks on state targets.

== Background ==
The Burundian Civil War lasted from 1993 to 2005, and an estimated 300,000 people were killed. The conflict ended with a peace process that brought in the 2005 constitution providing guaranteed representation for both Hutu and Tutsi, and parliamentary elections that led to Pierre Nkurunziza, from the Hutu FDD, becoming president.

Since 2005, poverty has remained a major problem. According to the World Bank, over 60% of Burundians do not have enough food. The country's government does not have enough money to fund needed programs and the economy is reliant on coffee exports whose price has fluctuated radically in recent years and made long-term financial planning nearly impossible.

=== Constitutionality of a third term ===
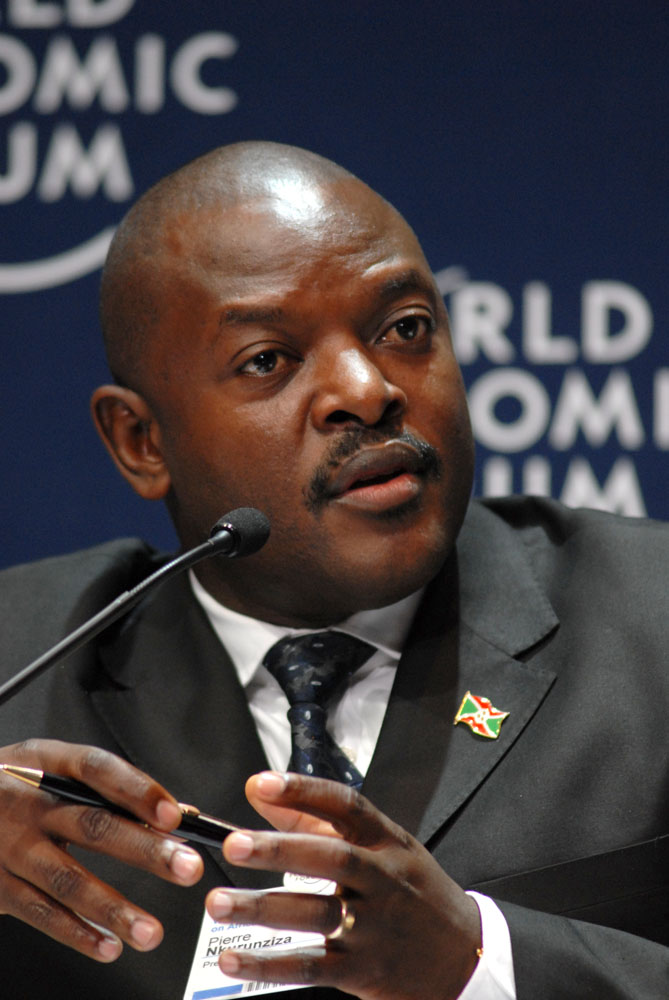
President Pierre Nkurunziza, pictured in 2008

On 4 May 2015, the Vice-President of the Constitutional Court fled the country following alleged death threats from senior figures in the government. The judge claimed that most of the seven judges on the country's highest court believed it would be unconstitutional for Nkurunziza to be elected again. United States Secretary of State John Kerry also stated on 4 May that Nkurunziza's nomination "flies directly in the face of the constitution."

Following the departures of four of the seven judges who sit on Burundi's constitutional court (including the Vice-President), the remaining judges approved Nkurunziza's right to run for a third term in office. Members of the opposition described the court's ruling as "manipulated."

Critics of the president say his actions jeopardise a peace deal that has kept ethnic tensions in check since the Burundian Civil War ended in 2005 and that Nkurunziza is not constitutionally permitted to seek a third term in office; his supporters argue that his first 5-year term should not count because he was elected by a parliamentary vote rather than a popular vote.

== Protests and uprising ==
=== First week of protests ===
On 25 April 2015, the ruling CNDD-FDD announced that Nkurunziza would run for a third term in the 26 June 2015 presidential election. The announcement sparked protests by those opposed to Nkurunziza and those who claimed a third term would be a violation of the country's constitution which says no President can be elected more than twice.

In the then-capital Bujumbura, protesters cut down trees to blockade roads. On 30 April, after days of protests, President Nkurunziza met with an American diplomat and told him that the protests were illegal.

On 1 May, a grenade attack took place in Bujumbura and killed three people, including two policemen, and human rights organizations said that protesters had been beaten and arrested. On the same day, a speech by President Nkurunziza was broadcast, in which he stated that the protests were illegal, and a committee would be established and submit its findings before the June election, so that "severe sanctions will be taken against those who will be found guilty" of illegal activities.

On 2 May, Security Minister, General Gabriel Nizigama said the protests were an "uprising" and that the demonstrators would be regarded as "criminals, terrorists and even enemies of the country".

The International Red Cross says at least six people were killed in the demonstrations, and Rupert Colville, a spokesman for the Office of the United Nations High Commissioner for Human Rights says that over 400 protesters were detained, and some were beaten in prison.

=== Second week of protests ===
Protests resumed on 4 May after a two-day suspension called for by protest leaders. Protests began peacefully but at least two protesters were shot and killed by police after stones were thrown at police.

=== Attempted coup d'état ===
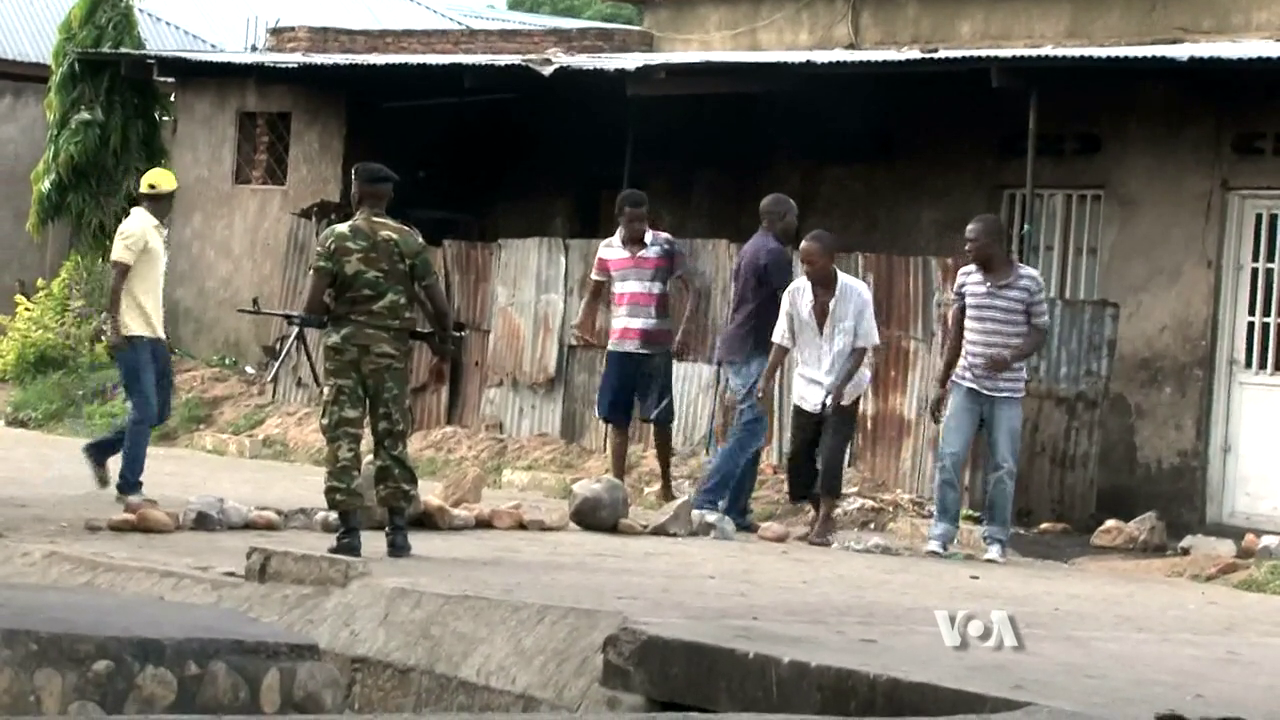
Burundian loyalists in Bujumbura on 18 May 2015, in the immediate aftermath of the failed coup

On 13 May 2015, Major General Godefroid Niyombare declared a coup d'état, announcing on radio that "Nkurunziza is dismissed, his government is dismissed too," while President Nkurunziza was in Tanzania attending an emergency conference about the situation in the country. Niyombare, a former army chief of staff and head of intelligence, announced the coup along with senior officers in the army and police, including a former defense minister. After the announcement, crowds stormed into the streets of the then-capital in celebration and soldiers were seen guarding the state broadcaster's headquarters.

Nkurunziza attempted to fly back to Burundi, but his plane was reportedly turned back to Tanzania. AFP reported that rebel soldiers had seized control of Bujumbura International Airport. Nevertheless, the head of the armed forces, Prime Niyongabo, declared from the RTNB state radio complex during the night of 13–14 May that the coup attempt had been defeated, and he called on rebel soldiers to surrender. Loyalist forces remained in control of the state radio and presidential palace. Shortly thereafter, AFP reported heavy fighting around the RTNB state radio complex as it was attacked by rebel soldiers. In the wake of the fighting, the station remained in loyalist hands.

Reuters reported that a journalist at the state broadcaster said there was "heavy gunfire" around the station in the then-capital. Reuters also heard from witnesses that two private radio stations that broadcast Niyombare's announcement had been attacked by men in police uniforms. Radio Publique Africaine was set ablaze. Five soldiers were reported killed in clashes that the government said retook control of the sites.

African Union chairperson Nkosazana Dlamini-Zuma stated that she "condemns in the strongest terms today's coup attempt" and called for a "return to constitutional order and urges all stakeholders to exercise utmost restraint." Nkurunziza thanked loyal soldiers who he said were "putting things in order" and said that rebel soldiers would be forgiven if they surrendered.

In the hours that followed the failed attacks on the state broadcaster, the coup appeared to begin collapsing. Later in the day on 14 May, Nkurunziza announced that he had returned to Burundi, although his specific location was not given for security reasons. He congratulated "the army and the police for their patriotism" and "above all the Burundian people for their patience". One of the coup leaders, General Cyrille Ndayirukiye, said that "our movement has failed" because of "overpowering military determination to support the system in power". He also suggested that soldiers backing the coup would not continue fighting, saying the coup leaders "don't want to be responsible for leading those who have followed us to their deaths."

Early on 15 May, Niyombare said that he and the other coup leaders had decided to surrender to government forces. Meanwhile, Nkurunziza returned to Bujumbura. Speaking on state radio later in the day, he said that there was "peace in the whole country" and vowed that anyone trying to stir up unrest would fail. The government also disclosed that Niyombare was still at large, contradicting an earlier statement that he had been captured.

On 16 May, eighteen people including former defence minister General Cyrille Ndayirukiye and police commissioners Zenon Ndabaneze and Hermenegilde Nimenya, appeared in court. Relatives claim that they had been beaten while in custody.

On 18 May President Nkurunziza dismissed three ministers from his cabinet: Minister of National Defence Pontien Gaciyubwenge, Foreign Minister Laurent Kavakure and Trade Minister Marie-Rose Nizigiyimana.

=== Pre-election violence ===
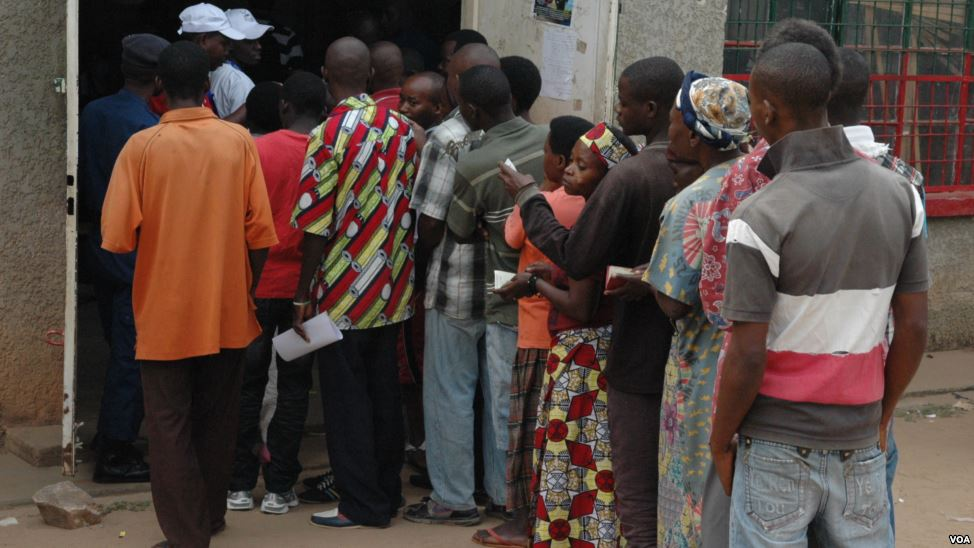
People voting in Bujumbura on 29 June 2015

After the attempted coup, heavily armed soldiers were deployed in Bujumbura. Nkurunziza decided to delay the parliamentary election, but not the presidential election, by 10 days after a recommendation by the election commission. One soldier was reportedly killed by police gunfire on 20 May 2015. Also on 20 May, Nkurunziza spoke about the dangers of ethnically based unrest and violence, recalling the dark days of the civil war and warning against a return to the "tensions of ethnic division". On May 23, three people were killed and 21 wounded when grenades were thrown in a market in Bujumbura.

Zedi Feruzi, the leader of a small opposition party, the Union for Peace and Development, was shot and killed along with his bodyguard in Bujumbura on 23 May 2015. Opposition parties broke off negotiations with the government after his death.

On 25 June 2015, Second Vice-President Gervais Rufyikiri, a member of the CNDD-FDD, left the country and went into exile in Belgium, declaring that Nkurunziza's candidacy was unconstitutional and that, by running, Nkurunziza was putting his own interests ahead of the nation's interests. He said that Nkurunziza was "deaf" to ignore all the voices calling on him not to run. The government welcomed Rufyikiri's departure and alleged that he was involved in the failed coup attempt. Meanwhile, Burundian students crawled under the gates of the US embassy parking lot, which is diplomatically protected.

Opposition groups announced on 26 June that they would boycott the election. On 27 June, "a group of unidentified young people" set fire to a building in Ntega district where ballot boxes and voting booths were being kept, destroying some of them. There were also two grenade attacks in Bujumbura, but there were no injuries.

Pie Ntavyohanyuma, the President of the National Assembly, fled to Belgium on 28 June 2015, citing the unrest and his opposition to Nkurunziza's third term bid. He said that when he told Nkurunziza that he should not run, "his answer was to threaten me, to humiliate me."

Speaking to a Kenyan television station on 6 July, one of the coup leaders, General Leonard Ngendakumana, called for armed rebellion against Nkurunziza. He said that his group was responsible for the grenade attacks and said that "our intent is to intensify". Fighting was reported in northern Burundi on 10–11 July. The military said on 13 July that 31 rebels had been killed and 170 had been captured in those battles; it said that six of its own soldiers had also been wounded. The Burundian government stated that the rebels had crossed into northern Burundi through the Nyungwe Forest from Rwanda but the Rwandan government denied this. Ngendakumana said that the rebels were from his group.

=== Post-election violence ===
Shortly after the election was held on 21 July 2015, without the participation of the opposition, main opposition leader Agathon Rwasa proposed the formation of a national unity government, while warning of the potential for more violence and armed rebellion against Nkurunziza. As conditions for participating in such a government, Rwasa said that Nkurunziza's third term would need to be greatly truncated to no more than a year and new elections would have to be held, although he admitted that he doubted Nkurunziza would accept those conditions. He also urged those hoping to oust Nkurunziza through violence to instead focus on dialogue. The government welcomed the idea of forming a national unity government, but rejected the notion of truncating Nkurunziza's new term.

General Adolphe Nshimirimana, the chief of presidential security, was assassinated in his car by gunmen in Bujumbura on 2 August 2015. Nshimirimana, who was killed along with three bodyguards, was considered a key ally of President Nkurunziza and described as his "right-hand man". He was said to have been heavily involved in countering protests against Nkurunziza and defeating the coup attempt, and he was accused by some of organizing murders of government opponents. A reporter who went to the location of the attack, Agence France-Presse correspondent Esdras Ndikumana, was arrested and allegedly beaten. He was released after two hours and was treated at a hospital for his injuries. On August 4, Nkurunziza ordered the police to apprehend Nshimirimana's assailants.

Pierre Claver Mbonimpa, a prominent human rights activist and opponent of Nkurunziza, was shot in Bujumbura on 3 August and "very badly wounded". On 9 August, he was transported to a hospital in Belgium for treatment.

On 15 August, Jean Bikomagu, a leader of the military during the Civil War, was assassinated in Bujumbura, heightening fears of another civil war developing.

Nkurunziza was sworn in for his third term a few days early, on 20 August 2015. The ceremony was not announced until the same day it was held. Speaking on the occasion, he described his re-election as "a victory of all Burundians". He vowed that if his enemies continued to pursue violence, they would be beaten with the aid of God and "scattered like flour thrown into the air".

Patrice Gahungu, spokesman for the Union for Peace and Development, a party opposed to Nkurunziza, was killed by gunmen on 8 September.

Gunmen attempted to kill General Prime Niyongabo, the army chief of staff, in an ambush in Bujumbura on 11 September 2015. Several people were reportedly killed, but Niyongabo survived the attack.

Low-level violence continued in the months that followed, as people on both sides continued to be targeted and killed. In an attempt to improve the security situation, Nkurunziza said on 2 November 2015 that anyone illegally possessing firearms must surrender them within five days or "be prosecuted according to the anti-terrorism law and be dealt with as enemies of the nation".

On 6 November, Welly Nzitonda, the son of opposition activist Pierre Claver Mbonimpa, was found dead a few hours after being arrested. A policeman was killed, and other officers were injured, when gunmen attacked a vehicle carrying a CNDD-FDD member of parliament on 27 November. Colonel Serges Kabanyura, a military zone commander, was wounded in an exchange of gunfire on 29 November.

==== 11 December 2015 Bujumbura attacks ====
Three military camps and an officers' school in Bujumbura came under fire on 11 December 2015. Several soldiers were reportedly killed, but the government said that the attacks had failed. Nevertheless, fighting continued well into the day, although it had apparently stopped by 12 December. Army Spokesman Gaspard Baratuza later updated the death toll to say: "The final toll of the attacks yesterday is 79 enemies killed, 45 captured, and 97 weapons seized, and on our side eight soldiers and policemen were killed and 21 wounded." While residents in Bujumbura discovered 39 bodies lying on the streets, Baratuza later said the bodies belonged to "enemies." The death toll also later rose to 87. Meanwhile, reports indicated soldiers and police went door to door dragging out young men from their homes before killing them. Other residents posted pictures on social media showing some of the bodies with their hands tied behind their backs, while police spokesman Pierre Nkurikiye said there were "no collateral victims." Baratuza added that those who attempted to raid the Ngagara military camp retreated and were pursued by security forces who "inflicted on them considerable losses." Kenya Airways also cancelled flights to Bujumbura International Airport on 11 December but said they would resume them on 13 December.

In the context of this violence, the African Union announced in mid-December 2015 that it planned to send peacekeepers to Burundi, but the government rejected any such deployment and said that if the troops were sent without its permission, it would be considered an invasion. On 23 December, the formation of a rebel group dedicated to forcing Nkurunziza out of power was officially announced; the group called itself the Republican Forces of Burundi (FOREBU). Nkurunziza reiterated on 30 December that AU peacekeepers were not welcome and that the army would fight back if they tried to deploy in Burundi. Other militants organized the "Resistance for the Rule of Law in Burundi" (RED-Tabara). The Burundian government subsequently began to claim that RED-Tabara was led by a prominent opposition figure, Alexis Sinduhije, and affiliated with the Movement for Solidarity and Democracy party. The rebel group denied links to Sinduhije.

=== 2016–2017 events ===
The government formed a commission in 2015 to consult the people on ideas for political reform. On 24 August 2016, the commission's chairman, Justin Nzoyisaba, said that the commission's findings were in favor of removing presidential term limits: "People said they have to erase the term limits; it means that the president can run for any time he wants." Nkurunziza indicated on 30 December 2016 that he would run for a fourth term if the constitution was changed, providing that it was the will of the people.

Emmanuel Niyonkuru, the Minister of Water, the Environment and Planning, was shot and killed in Bujumbura in the early hours of 1 January 2017.

On 12 May 2017, Nkurunziza appointed a commission to draft changes to the constitution in line with the outcome of the consultative process, which backed the removal of term limits, within six months.

On 17 May 2017, three people were killed and three others injured when an unidentified person threw a grenade in Musaga neighborhood, south of Bujumbura.

On 10 July 2017, unidentified attackers threw a grenade to a bar at Shinya in Gatara district, northern Burundi at approximately 8pm local time, killing 8 people and injured another 66 in which 10 were in serious condition, according to local officials and police.

On 8 August 2017, at around 8pm, unknown attackers threw two grenades at a bar Buyenzi zone of Bujumbura, killing two people and injuring five others.

On the night of 17 August 2017, at least three people were killed and 27 wounded in Bujumbura, after grenades were thrown into two bars in the Buyenzi district, according to police and hospital sources.

== Aftermath ==
Although security forces successfully suppressed unrest in Burundi, armed opposition militants continued to be active. FOREBU (later renamed to "Popular Forces of Burundi" or FPB) as well as RED-Tabara joined the FNL in the DR Congo, where they became involved in the Kivu conflict and began to clash with the Armed Forces of the Democratic Republic of the Congo (FARDAC). In October 2019, RED-Tabara launched a cross-border raid into Burundi. In the next month, unidentified militants ambushed Burundian Army soldiers at the Burundi-Rwanda border, resulting in accusations by the Burundian government that Rwanda was supporting local rebel groups.

== Refugees ==
By 6 May 2015 the United Nations reported that 40,000 people had fled to seek safety in neighbouring Rwanda, the Democratic Republic of the Congo and Tanzania. By 13 May at least an additional 10,000 people had fled. On 14 May the UN said that over 70,000 people had fled the country. On 18 May 2015 the figure had been revised up to 112,000 refugees and asylum-seekers.

By 22 May 2015 a cholera epidemic had broken out amongst refugees in Tanzania and affected over 3,000 people. At least 31 refugees in Tanzania had died from the disease and between 3–500 new cases were being found every day.

In February 2017, United Nations stated that there are 380,000 refugees who fled Burundi, mostly sheltering in neighbouring Tanzania.

As of February 2018, UNHCR has reported 428,000 refugees have fled Burundi into neighbouring countries.

== Reactions ==
=== Domestic ===
The government shut down Radio Publique Africaine and blocked instant messaging services and social media sites it said were used to co-ordinate protests. Reporters Without Borders condemned the restrictions on press and citizen communication. All universities were closed. On 30 December 2019 prosecutors called for sentences of 15 years each for 4 independent reporters who worked for Iwacu. Reporters Without Borders organised a petition on behalf of the four.

==== Military's response ====
On 2 May 2015, the Defence Minister, General Pontien Gaciyubwenge, said that the army was neutral and called for an end to attacks on citizens' rights. On 3 May the army's chief of staff General Prime Niyongabo stated it "remains and will remain a republican and loyalist army that is respectful of the laws and rules of Burundi and of those who govern it".

=== International ===
Supranational

- African Union – On 7 May 2015, Chairperson of the African Union Commission, Nkosazana Dlamini-Zuma called on the government to postpone the election because of the instability. On December 18, the African Union Peace and Security Council authorized MAPROBU, a peacekeeping mission of up to 5,000 peacekeepers. It threatened to invoke Article 4(h) of the Constitutive Act of the African Union, allowing it to deploy an intervention force even without the host government's consent, if the government of Burundi does not accept MAPROBU within 96 hours.
- – The East African Community expressed concern at the number of people seeking refuge in neighbouring countries out of fear of violence. Ministers from Rwanda, Tanzania, Kenya and Uganda then travelled to the country for talks to try to end the crisis.
- – United Nations Secretary General Ban Ki-moon called "on the Burundian authorities to conduct a prompt investigation into the deaths that occurred during the recent demonstrations so that those responsible are held accountable." The UN tried to facilitate talks between the government, opposition and civil society groups.

States

- Belgium – On May 21, 2015, the Foreign Ministry stated that "a third presidential term would stain at the highest level the legitimacy of the Burundi executive, and would make the completion of the bilateral program impossible."
- Kenya – President Uhuru Kenyatta asked for the presidential election to be delayed.
- Rwanda – On 4 May, the Government of Rwanda issued a statement that read: "Rwanda urges the Government of Burundi to take immediate necessary steps to ensure the protection of its population, end the worsening humanitarian situation and restore peace."
- South Africa – On 19 May, South Africa called on Burundi to indefinitely postpone the planned election until stability returned.
- United States – On 4 May, Secretary of State John Kerry said the U.S. was "deeply concerned" about the situation.

In September 2016, United Nations' Human Rights Council established a Commission of Inquiry on Burundi. Committee's mandate was renewed in September 2017. Since 2016 the government has refused to share information or cooperate with the Commission of Inquiry on Burundi – twice threatening legal action against its members.

=== Collective ===
While the UN expressed alarm over the situation by mid-November, it was also joined by the United States, whose regional envoy, Tom Perriello, was to hold talks with regional states Ethiopia, Rwanda and Uganda. The International Criminal Court's Fatou Bensouda also threatened she would investigate allegations of war crimes. This came shortly after apparent incendiary rhetoric from the government. Senate President Révérien Ndikuriyo said the opposition would be "pulverize[d]" if they do not lay down arms before a 13 November 2015 deadline. "Today, the police shoot in the legs... but when the day comes that we tell them to go to 'work,' do not come crying to us." (The phrase "work" was a euphemism used during the Rwandan genocide to describe committing acts of mass killing). Vice President Gaston Sindimwo similarly said: "Holiday time is over." In criticising the rhetoric (similar to the lead up to the Rwandan Genocide by such outlets as RTLM), opposition leader Jeremiah Minani denounced the "messages of hate and division" and warned that "genocide is on its way." The United Nations Security Council was due to meet on 9 November 2015 to discuss the crisis, at the behest of the French delegation, who also denounced the wave of "hate speech." In October 2017, the International Criminal Court started an investigation into crimes in Burundi since April 2015.

== See also ==
- South Sudanese Civil War
- Second Ivorian Civil War
- 2013 Guinea clashes
- 2020 Cuban protests
- 2020 Ivorian protests
- List of protests in the 21st century
