= Chief of the Defence Staff (Burundi) =

Professional head of the Burundi National Defence Force

Chief of Defence Staff
- Chef de la Force de Défense Nationale du Burundi (French); Umukuru w’ibiro bikuru vya gisirikare (Kirundi)
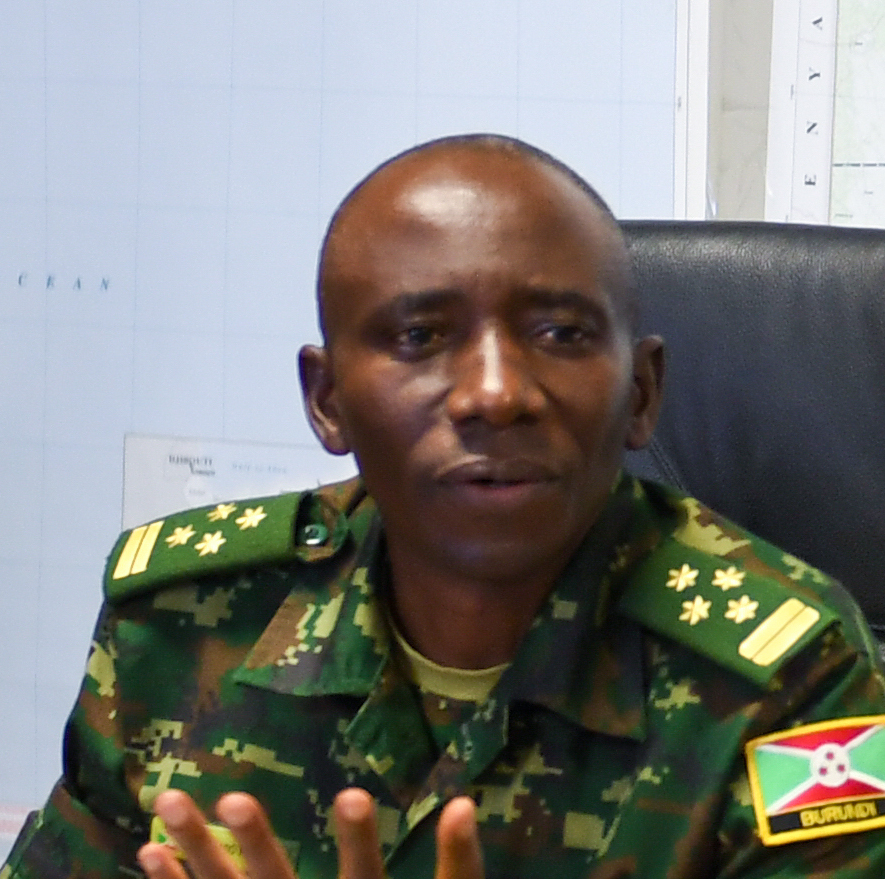
- Incumbent; General Prime Niyongabo since 9 November 2012; 13 years ago
- Burundi National Defence Force
- Type: Chief of defence; Chief of staff
- Abbreviation: C/FDNB
- Reports to: Minister of National Defense & War Veterans
- Seat: État-Major Général, Bujumbura
- Appointer: President of Burundi with advice and consent from Senate
- Constituting instrument: Constitution of Burundi; Arrêté Royale No 001/614; Loi organique N°1/ 022 du 31 Décembre 2004; Loi organique N°1/ 04 du 20 février 2017
- Formation: 7 March 1966; 60 years ago
- First holder: Major Albert Shibura
- Deputy: Chef Adjoint de la Force de Défense
- Website: Official website

The Chief of the Defence Staff (French: Chef de la Force de Défense Nationale du Burundi, Kirundi: Umukuru w’ibiro bikuru vya gisirikare , C/FDNB; lit. 'Chief of the Burundi National Defence Force') is the military head of the Burundi National Defence Force, overseeing all military operations.

The headquarters of the army's general staff (French: État-Major Général de le FDNB, EMG/FDNB) is made up of three major components: the Land Force, the Air Force and the Navy.

== List of officeholders ==
=== Chiefs of staff (1962–1966) ===
No.	Portrait	Name (Birth–Death)	Term of office			Ref.
No.	Portrait	Name (Birth–Death)	Took office	Left office	Time in office	Ref.
1		Colonel; Verwayen	1 July 1962	7 March 1966	3 years, 8 months	

=== Chiefs of defence staff (1966–present) ===
No.	Portrait	Name (Birth–Death)	Term of office			Ref.
No.	Portrait	Name (Birth–Death)	Took office	Left office	Time in office	Ref.
2		Major; Albert Shibura (born 1939)	7 March 1966	6 May 1967	1 year, 1 month	
3		Major General; Thomas Ndabemeye	6 May 1967	1976	8–9 years	
4		Colonel; Sylvère Nzohabonayo	1976	1977	0–1 years	
5		Colonel; Antoine Niyungeko	1977	1981	3–4 years	
6		Lieutenant colonel Charles Kazatsa	1981	1982	3–4 years	
7		Colonel; Herménélgide Karenzo	1982	1987	4–5 years	
8		Colonel; Edmond Ndakazi	1987	1989	1–2 years	
9		Colonel; Michel Mibarurwa	1989	1993	3–4 years	
10		Colonel; Jean Bikomagu (died 2015)	1993	20 August 1996	2–3 years	
11		Lieutenant general Vincent Niyungeko	1996	2002	5–6 years	
12		Lieutenant general Germain Niyoyankana (born 1955)	2002	2005	2–3 years	
13		Major General; Samuel Gahiro	2005	2009	3–4 years	
14		Major General; Godefroid Niyombare (born 1969)	2009	2012	2–3 years	
15		General; Prime Niyongabo (born 1970)	9 November 2012	Incumbent	13 years, 9 months	
