= National Intelligence Service (Burundi) =

Government agency

- Service National de Renseignement (SNR)

Agency overview
- Formed: 1984; 42 years ago as National Security Service (Surêté Nationale)
- Preceding agency: National Security Service (Surêté Nationale)
- Headquarters: Bujumbura, Burundi
- Employees: Classified
- Annual budget: Classified
- Agency executive: General Ildephonse Habarurema, Administrator-General
- Parent agency: Burundi

The National Intelligence Service (French: Service National de Renseignement, or SNR) is the national civilian intelligence and security agency of Republic of Burundi tasked with advancing national security through collecting and analyzing intelligence from internal and external and conducting civilian intelligence cybersecurity, clandestine and covert operations, counter-revolutionary, counterintelligence, counterterrorism, creation a civilian security network intelligence, executive protection (especially the President of the Republic of Burundi and Prime Minister of Burundi), intelligence gathering, internal security, maintain confidentiality of civilian intelligence information and documents, political security, political warfare, support irregular warfare operations, and threat assessment to national security.

The SNR is headed by an administrator-general (administrateur général) who reports directly to the President of the Republic of Burundi, while its individual agents report both to the SNR hierarchy and the public prosecutor. It runs its own detention facilities and is separate from the National Police of Burundi (Police Nationale du Burundi, PNB) and the Burundi National Defence Force (Force de la Défense Nationale du Burundi, FDNB).

== History and role ==
The SNR superseded the National Security Service (Surêté nationale) founded under the regime of Jean-Baptiste Bagaza in 1984 which was popularly known as the "National Documentation" (Documentation nationale). It was reorganised in 2006 under the regime of Pierre Nkurunziza with a mission of "research, centralization, and exploitation of all information of a political, security, economic and social nature necessary for the government to act to guarantee the security of the state". Its members wear plain clothes and are often recruited from among former members of the Forces for the Defense of Democracy (Forces pour la Défense de la Démocratie, FDD) militia who fought for Nkurunziza in the Burundian Civil War. It is one of the few Burundian government institutions not subject to the system of ethnic quotas imposed by the Arusha Accords.

According to a 2006 report by Human Rights Watch (HRW), SNR agents "are known to be particularly brutal in carrying out their missions and to often act outside the law". It attributed 38 extrajudicial killings to SNR members in that year alone. The SNR has been accused of numerous human rights abuses in connection to the political unrest in Burundi after 2015. HRW subsequently documented numerous allegations of torture perpetrated by the SNR, sometimes in collaboration with the National Police during this period. In 2018 BBC News investigated allegations that the SNR had been running a "secret killing house" in Bujumbura where political activists hostile to Nkurunziza had been detained illegally, tortured, and killed.

== Administrators-General of the SNR ==
The following have served as Administrator-General (administrateur général) of the SNR since its inception:

- Adolphe Nshimirimana (2004–2014)
- Godefroid Niyombare (2014–2015), who was later a leading figure in the 2015 Burundian coup d'état attempt
- Étienne Ntakirutimana (2015–2019)
- Gervais Ndirakobuca (2019—2020)
- Ildephonse Habarurema (2020-)

== See also ==
- Guardians of the Peace, a pro-government militia active in 1997–2005
