= Albert Shibura =

Burundian politician and diplomat

Burundian Interior Minister and Minister of Justice
- In office July 15, 1972 – June 5, 1973

Burundian Ambassador to China
- In office June 5, 1973 – 1975
- Succeeded by: Simon Sabimbona

Ambassador of Burundi to Uganda
- In office 1970–1971
- Succeeded by: Jonathas Niyungeko

Chief of the Defence Staff of the Armed Forces of Burundi
- In office March 7, 1966 – May 6, 1967
- Preceded by: Colonel Verwayen
- Succeeded by: Major General Thomas Ndabemeye

Personal details
- Born: 1939 (age 86–87) Bururi

Albert Shibura (born 1939) is a Burundian retired politician and military officer.

== Early life ==
Albert Shibura was born in 1939 in the Matana region of the present Bururi Province, Ruanda-Urundi. After six years of primary education, he attended the Groupe Scolaire de Astrida. He subsequently attended Lovanium University in the Belgian Congo before failing out of his classes. Shibura later studied in Munich, West Germany before enrolling at the École spéciale militaire de Saint-Cyr.

== Career ==
After two years of study at Saint-Cyr, Shibura returned to Burundi in 1965 and was commissioned as a second lieutenant in the Burundi National Army.

- From 7 March 1966 to May 6, 1967 he was chief of staff of the Military of Burundi.
- From 15 July 1972 to 5 June 1973 he was Minister of Interior and Justice in the administration of Albin Nyamoya.
- From 5 June 1973 to 1975 he was the first Burundian ambassador in Beijing with accreditation in Pyongyang.
- From 1980 to 1981 he was ambassador in Kampala.

== Works cited ==
- Weinstein, Warren (1976). Historical Dictionary of Burundi. Metuchen: Scarecrow Press. ISBN 978-0-8108-0962-8.
