= Pontien Gaciyubwenge =

Burundian politician, soldier (born 1956)

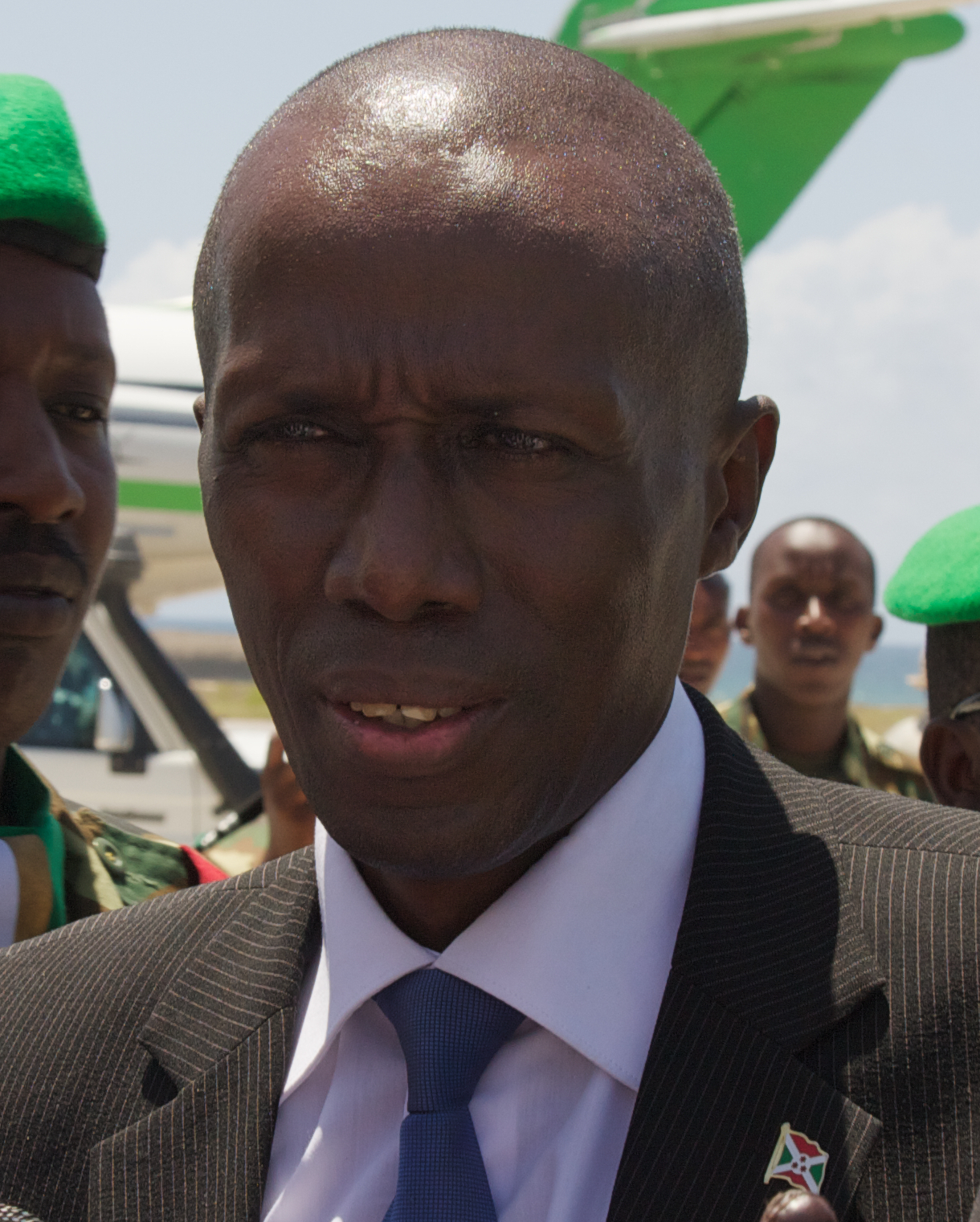
- Gaciyubwenge in 2011

Minister of National Defence
- In office 30 August 2010 – 18 May 2015
- President: Pierre Nkurunziza
- Succeeded by: Emmanuel Ntahomvukiye

Personal details
- Born: 1956 (age 69–70) Mwaro, Burundi

Pontien Gaciyubwenge (born 1956) is a Burundian politician and soldier. He served as Minister of National Defence in the government of President Pierre Nkurunziza from 30 August 2010 until he was fired on 18 May 2015, after a failed coup d'état took place.

== Life ==
Gaciyubwenge was born in Mwaro in 1956. He obtained higher military education in Bujumbura from 1977 to 1982 and received additional training in the United States. Gaciyubwenge subsequently held command over groups, battalions and military regions until he was named director of planning. On 30 August 2010, while holding the rank of major general, he was appointed Minister of Defence in a cabinet reshuffle.

On 2 May 2015, during the 2015 Burundian unrest, Gaciyubwenge urged the armed forces of Burundi to remain neutral and act in accordance with the Arusha Agreements that ended the Burundian Civil War. He also stated that "all political actors" should avoid the use of violence. On 18 May 2015, after a failed coup d'état took place, he was fired. He was replaced as Minister by Emmanuel Ntahomvukiye.
