= 1989–1990 protests in Ivory Coast =

- Date: May 3, 1990
- Location: Côte d'Ivoire
- Caused by: Austerity Measures; Assault on demonstrators; Inspiration from 1989–1990 unrest in Benin
- Goals: Fresh general elections; Withdrawal of new bills; Better conditions
- Methods: Demonstrations, Riots
- Result: Protests suppressed by force; Meetings/Negotiations with democratic protesters

The 1989–1990 protests in Ivory Coast was massive violent demonstrations and a popular uprising that sprang up in Ivory Coast or Côte d'Ivoire in late-1989 to mid-1990, inspired by the 1989–1990 unrest in Benin against the government, low salaries and more.

== Background ==
Large student-led demonstrations occurred in the spring of 1990, descending into violent clashes and battles between the army and protesters. The protest movement would be the biggest the country has seen since its independence and the confrontations with the military during the protests would be the bloodiest since independence.

== Protests ==
Protesters wanted the fall of Félix Houphouët-Boigny who is president of the country. Nationwide pro-democracy protests erupted in the fall of 1989, when protesters wanted multiparty democracy and political freedoms. Tensions was rising amid violence at nonviolent protests and staged strikes by the opposition. In April–June 1989, a wave of strikes affected the industrial sectors in the country, inspiring people across the country.

In response to deepening anger and widespread discontent, the government failed to silence and quell the disturbances so negotiations and peaceful protest actions was held instead but this didn't stop protests. Demonstrators and students, high school students and university teachers marched in February for two months, protesting nth government's fake promises in Abidjan and demanded better conditions, paid salaries and the resignation of the president.

The government’s forces used live ammunition, batons and tear gas to prevent the gatherings, public meetings, anger, writing letters, speeches and nonviolent rallies from occurring. After waves of popular uprising and peaceful demonstrations, the government responded with negotiations, meeting its protesters and leaders of protest rallies and protest movement and made their demands clear. In 1991, four were killed in May–June during bloody crackdowns and deadly confrontations with the military after raids on campuses. Protesters rallied against the use of Police brutality.

== See also ==
- 2020 Ivorian protests
- 1989–1990 unrest in Benin
