= Law enforcement in Burundi =

Burundi National Police Urwego rw'inyamiramabi rw'Uburundi (Kirundi) Police Nationale du Burundi (French)
- Common name: Burundi Police
- Abbreviation: PNB
- Motto: Kirundi: "Inkinzo y'Umutekano"; French: "Bouclier de la Sécurité"; English: "The Shield to Security"

Agency overview
- Formed: 2004; 22 years ago
- Preceding agency: National Gendarmerie (1967–2004) Public Security Police (1990–2004)

Jurisdictional structure
- National agency: BDI
- Operations jurisdiction: BDI
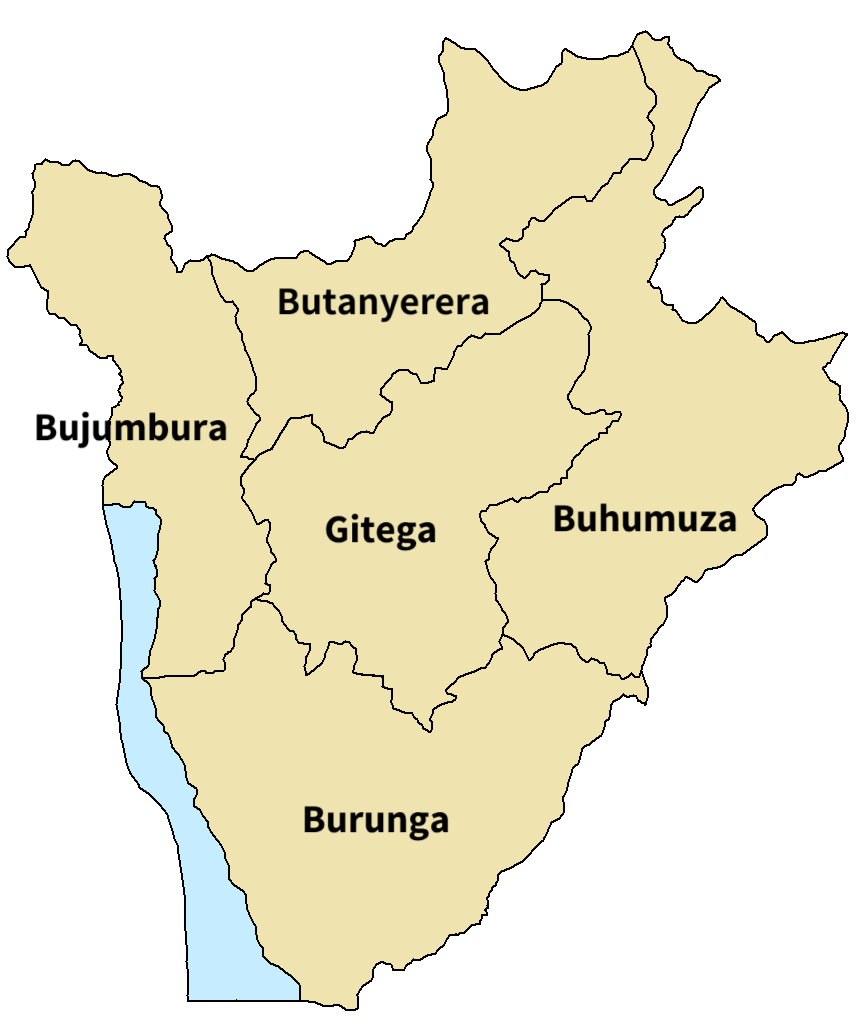
- Map of Burundi National Police's jurisdiction
- Area: 27,834 square kilometres (10,747 sq mi)
- Population: 14,151,540(2024)
- Governing body: Ministry of Interior, Community Development and Public Security
- General nature: Civilian police

Operational structure
- Overseen by: General Inspectorate of the Burundi National Police
- Headquarters: Bujumbura
- Minister responsible: Hon. Léonidas Ndaruzaniye, Minister of Interior, Community Development and Public Security
- Agency executives: Brig. Gen. Joseph Ninteretse, Inspector General of Police (IGPNB); Brig. Gen. Emmanuel Ndayiziga, Deputy Inspector General of Burundi National Police (DIGPNB)
- Parent agency: Ministry of Interior, Community Development and Public Security
- Units: List: - General Commissariat of the Internal Security Police(French: "Commissariat Général de la Police de Sécurité Intérieure"), made of : • Traffic Police and Road Safety Unit ( French: "Unité de Police de Roulage et de la Sécurité Routière" - PRSR); • Rapid Intervention Mobile Group (French: "Groupement Mobile d'Interventiom Rapide" - GMIR); • Marine Police Unit (French: "Unité de Police Marine" - UPM); • Anti-Terrorist Police Unit (French: "Unité de Police Antit-Terroriste" - UPAT); • Group for the Support of Institutional Protection (French: "Groupement d'Appui à la Protection des Institutions" - GAPI); • Riot Control Unit (French: "Unité Anti-Émeute" - UAE); - General Commissariat of the Judicial Police (French: "Commissariat General de la Police Judiciaire") made of : • INTERPOL National Central Office - Bujumbura (French: "Bureau Central National de l'Interpol Bujumbura" - BCN-Interpol Bujumbura); • Judicial Research and Intervention Brigade (French: "Brigade de Recherche et d'intervention Judiciaire" - BRIJ); • Child Protection and Morals Unit (French: "Unité de Protection des Mineurs et des Mœurs" - UMPP); • Anti-Narcotics Unit (French: "Unité Anti-Drogue" - UAD); • Anti Police Misconduct Unit (French: "Unité chargée de la lutte contre la Délinquance Policière - UDP); - General Commissariat for Migration(French: "Commissariat Général des Migrations"); • Bujumbura Airport Commissariat (French: "Commissariat Aéroportuaire de Bujumbura"); • Bujumbura Port Commissariat (French: "Commissariat Portuaire de Bujumbura"); • Border Control Police
- Provinces: Provinces of Burundi

Facilities
- Patrol cars: Toyota Hilux

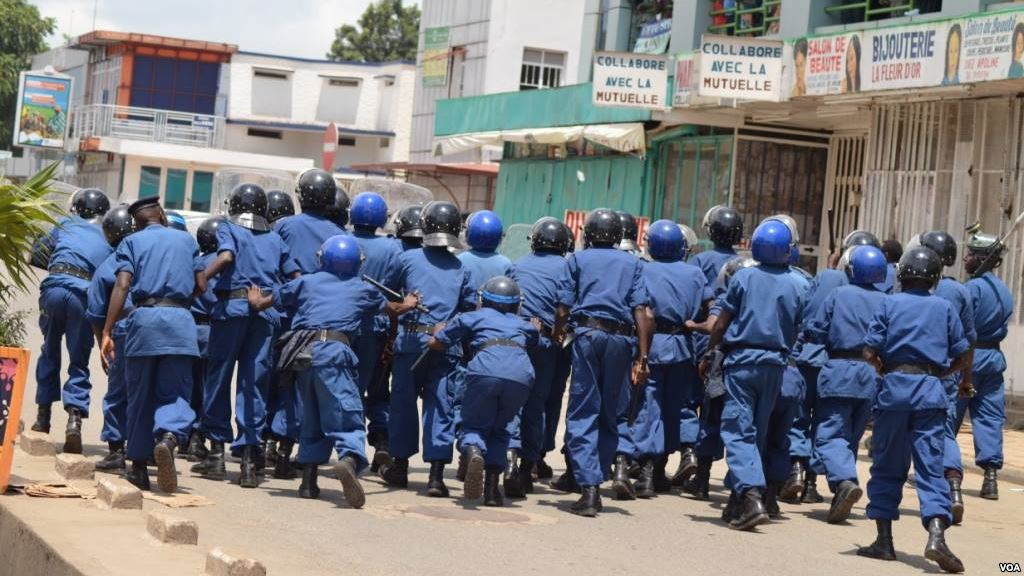
Burundian riot police in action in April 2015 against anti-government protestors during the popular unrest in 2015-2018

The principle law enforcement agency in Burundi is the National Police of Burundi (Kirundi: Urwego rw'inyamiramabi rw'Uburundi, French: Police nationale du Burundi PNB). The police falls within the jurisdiction of the Ministry of Interior, Community Development and Public Security. It is separate from the National Intelligence Service (SNR), the state intelligence agency.

== Origins ==
Under Belgian colonial rule (1916–62), law enforcement in Burundi was the responsibility of a small unit of the Force Publique which was a gendarmerie with a combined military function from the Belgian Congo. Its members were popularly known as Bamina in Burundi, after the large military base at Kamina in the Congo.

Law enforcement fell under the mandate of the newly created National Gendarmerie (Gendarmerie nationale) after Burundian independence in 1962. Although initially civilian-led, this became part of the army under the military dictatorships after 1967. A separate civilian police force was re-established in 1990 as the Public Security Police (Police de sécurité publique) which co-existed with the Gendarmerie.

== National Police of Burundi ==
The PNB was founded in December 2004, following the end of the Burundian Civil War and the Arusha Accords. Its stated objectives are the maintenance of public order, the protection of the population, and the fight against organised crime. Its objective was to provide a single, integrated police force under the leadership of a single Directorate-General (Direction générale), replacing the previous system of administrative fragmentation. It's headed by Inspectorate General of Police (IGPNB) headquartered in Bujumbura.The PNB is divided into missions, dealing with separate areas as well as five regional commissariats. The different services in 2014 were:

- Internal Security Police (Police de sécurité intérieure)
- Judicial Police (Police judiciaire)
- Air Police (Police de l'Air)
- Border and Aliens Police (Police des frontières et des étrangers)
- Prison Police (Police pénitentiaire)

Most of Burundi's police force is concentrated in Bujumbura, the de facto capital city, and other major urban centres. The PNB members are armed, often with "Kalashnikov-type assault rifles".

Burundi has been a member of INTERPOL since 1970. Burundian police have been deployed abroad as part of United Nations (UN) operations in Africa.

== Criticism ==
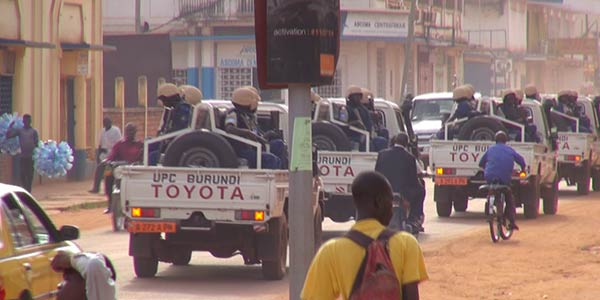
Burundian police on patrol in the Central African Republic in 2014 as part of the African Union-led MISCA force

Corruption is a major problem for the PNB. According to a 2014 survey by Afrobarometer, the PNB is widely considered the most corrupt of Burundi's public services. Transparency International reported that over 80 percent of Burundians believed that there was corruption within the police service in 2014. The Burundian government has tried to resolve the corruption problem with the aid of foreign assistance from countries including the Netherlands. Although little effective citizen oversight exists, there is theoretically a police ombudsman and attorney general, both tasked with dealing with complaints against police. According to the US Department of State, the Burundian National Police "is comprised largely of former rebel fighters, lacks accountability and has minimal capacity to respond to crises and investigate crimes in a just manner in accordance with human rights". However, 2014 polling also indicated that 54–83 percent of Burundians had "confidence" in the PNB and approximately 65 percent of the population claim to respect the PNB and believed it is disciplined.

The PNB was frequently used to suppress anti-government protests during the popular unrest in Burundi in 2015. Police violence against protesters, both in the form of beatings and shootings, was particularly criticised by Human Rights Watch. As a response, in 2016, the UN decided to repatriate 280 Burundian police from the MINUSCA mission in the Central African Republic because of accusations that its personnel had committed atrocities in Burundi before their departure. Burundi also refused an offer by the UN Security Council to deploy 288 UN police officers to Burundi in August 2016. Further abuses continued into 2018.

== See also ==
- National Intelligence Service (SNR), the Burundian state intelligence agency;
- National Defence Force (FDN), the Burundian military.
- Guardians of the Peace, a state-led militia during the Burundian Civil War active 1997–2005
