= Burundi–India relations =

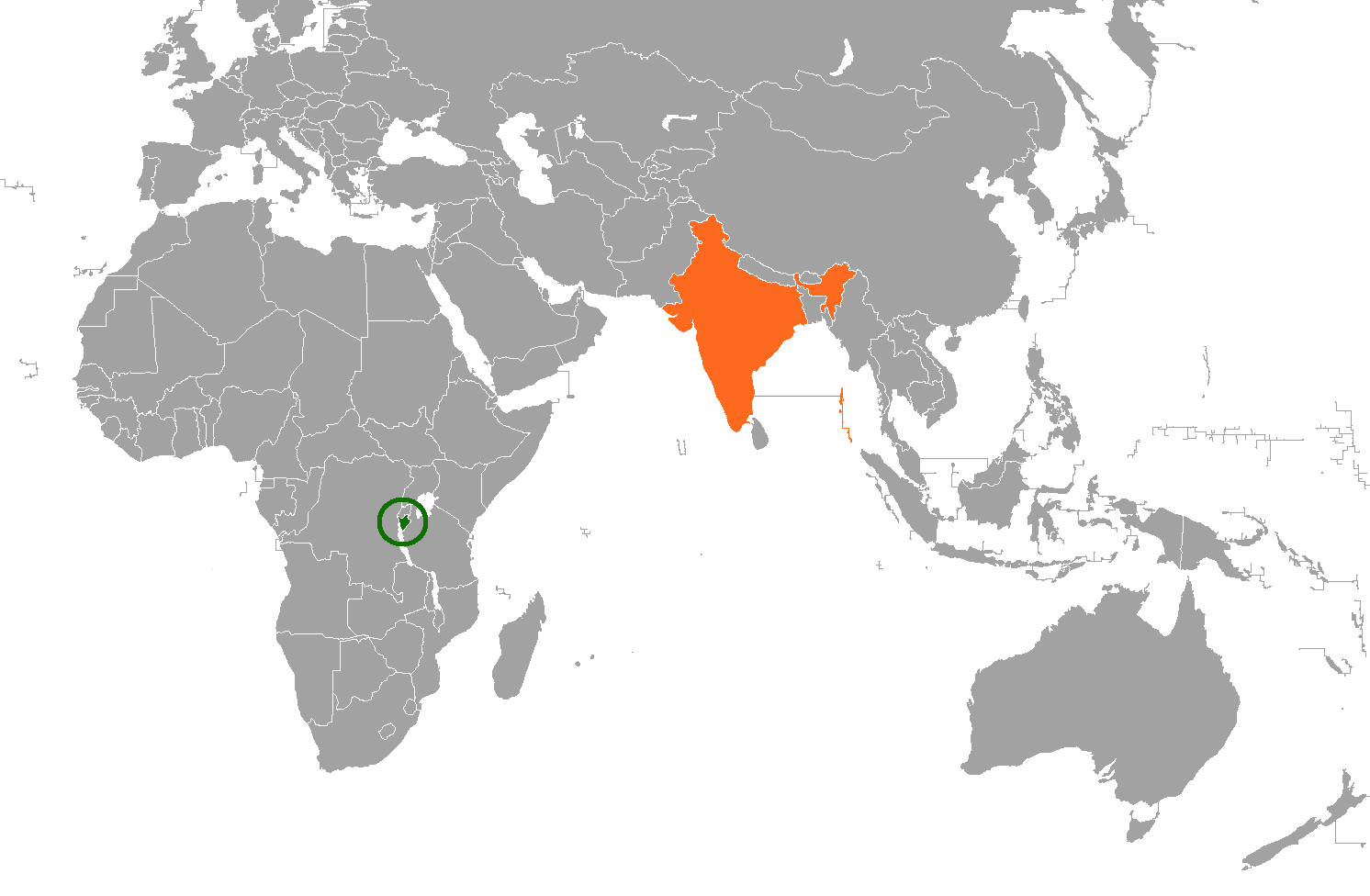

- Burundi: India

Diplomatic mission
- Embassy of Burundi, New Delhi: Embassy of India, Bujumbura

Burundi–India relations are the international relations that exist between Burundi and India. Apart from bilateral relations, India also engages with Burundi through the African Union and the Regional Economic Communities (RECs).

== History ==
Relations between Burundi and India began to grow after the East African Community revoked their sanctions against Burundi and admitted the country into the organisation in May 2007. Burundi opened its embassy in New Delhi in 2009, and the first resident Ambassador to India assumed office in 2010. The High Commission of India in Kampala, Uganda is jointly accredited to Burundi.

Several high level diplomatic visits between the countries have taken place. Defence Minister Germain Niyoyankana visited India in May 2006. Burundi's Second Vice-President Marine Barampama was the guest of honour at the CII-EXIM Bank Conclave on India-Africa Partnership in October 2006. Foreign Minister Augustin Nsanze participated in the CII-Exim Bank India-Africa Partnership Summit in March 2010. He visited again in February 2011 to attend the LDC Ministerial Conference.

Burundian President Pierre Nkurunziza made a state visit to India in September 2012. During the visit, the two countries signed agreements on co-operation in the fields of rural development, education, health, and medicine. Indian Prime Minister Manmohan Singh stated that "India is committed to the development of infrastructure in Burundi". Nkurunziza had previously made a private visit to seek medical treatment in the country in 2010. He was paid a courtesy visit by an Indian Foreign Ministry official. Second Vice President Gervais Rufyikiri and a business delegation attended the 9th CII Exim Bank Conclave in New Delhi in March 2013. Several other Burundian ministers have also visited India.

From India, the highest level visits to Burundi have been at the level of minister of state. Minister of State for External Affairs Preneet Kaur visited Burundi in February 2012, becoming the first Indian minister to visit the country. Kaur met with the President and Foreign Minister, and signed a General Cooperation Agreement. An Indian business delegation that accompanied Kaur, held meeting with Burundian businessmen. Minister of State for Rural Development Sudarshan Bhagat visited Burundi in July 2015 as Prime Minister's Special Envoy. He met with the President and Foreign Minister.

Burundi supports India's candidature for a permanent seat in the UN Security Council.

== Trade ==
India was the second largest source for imports to Burundi in 2015. Bilateral trade between Burundi and India totaled US$30.89 million in 2013-14. India exported $30.71 million worth of goods to Burundi, and imported $180,000. The main commodities exported by India to Burundi are pharmaceuticals and chemicals, machinery and instruments, plastic and linoleum products, transport equipment, rubber manufactured products and chemicals. The major commodities imported by India from Burundi are non-electrical machinery, iron and steel.

As of August 2015, entities owned by Indians have a total investment of over $20 million in Burundi. Several companies owned by Indians and persons of Indian origin (PIO) operate in Burundi such as Angelique International Ltd (power sector), Jain Irrigation Systems (irrigation), Lucky Exports Ltd (traders of agro–based commodities and minerals), and Akagera Business Group (diversified operations). Indian manufacturers Bajaj Auto and TVS Motor Company retail motorbikes and auto-rickshaws in Burundi through their local dealers. PIO-owned Contec Global Burundi based in Bujumbura is the authorized printer of passports, visa stickers, and other identity documents for the Burundian government.

== Cultural relations ==
Burundians often visit India to study in the country or to seek medical attention. The Indian High Commission in Kampala issued 447 student visas to Burundian nationals between 2012 and 2014, and 205 medical visas in 2014 alone.

Citizens of Burundi are eligible for scholarships under the Indian Technical and Economic Cooperation Programme and the Indian Council for Cultural Relations. The Government of India also offers fully paid scholarships and fellowships in under-graduate, graduate, post-graduate and research courses in India for Burundian nationals. They also qualify for fully paid short-term training courses in India.

== Indians in Burundi ==
As of August 2015, around 450 Indian citizens of persons of Indian origin reside in Burundi. The majority of them are employed as traders and businessmen by multinational companies in the country.

== Foreign aid ==
India has offered to provide Burundi with lines of credit worth $4.22 million for a farm mechanization project, and another $0.17 million to help design an Integrated Food Processing Complex in Burundi. In May 2011, Burundi signed an agreement with the EXIM Bank of India to receive an $80 million LOC for the 30MW Kabu hydro-electric power project.

The African Union nominated Burundi as the site for an India-Africa Vocational Training Centre (VTC) at the first India Africa Forum Summit in 2008. India trained Burundians in operations, and handed over the Centre to the Government of Burundi in April 2014. India also established a pan-African institute called the India-Africa Institute of Educational Planning and Administration (IAIEPA) under commitments made at the Summit. The Institute was opened in 2015. India pledged to build a cluster bio-mass gasifier system in Burundi at the second India Africa Forum Summit in 2011. India also offered to build a Farm Science Centre, an institution innovated by the Indian Council of Agriculture Research, in the country.

Under the Pan African e-network project, India set up tele-medicine and tele-education centers in Burundi in 2010. The tele-medicine centers will enable Burundian doctors to consult with doctors in India. In April 2010, the two countries signed an agreement to establish an Information Technology Centre in Burundi with Indian assistance. India donated two consignments of medicines worth nearly $440,000 in June and July 2010 for distribution in refugee camps in Burundi. After a fire in Bujumbura, a major revenue-earning market of the Burundian Government, caused a financial crisis affecting the functioning of the Burundian Permanent Mission in New York, the Indian Government provided the country with $100,000 as grant assistance. India donated $100,000 to provide relief in the wake of flooding in Burundi in February 2014.

India has offered Burundi the Duty Free Tariff Preference (DFTP) scheme, which India extends to the Least Developed Countries (LDCs).
