= 1989–1990 unrest in Benin =

The 1989–1990 unrest in Benin was a wave of protests, demonstrations, nonviolent boycotts, grassroots rallies, opposition campaigns and strikes in Benin against the government of Mathieu Kérékou, unpaid salaries, and new budget laws.

== Protests ==
Protests were first kicked off by teachers unions, protesting unpaid salaries in January for 10 days. The strike was the longest in their history, and they were joined by trade unions, university students and healthcare workers, protesting against unpaid salaries and calling for better wage increases. Secondary and elementary school teachers joined in, calling for new national wage security and an end to corruption. Protest was met with Riot police repression. Priests, students and opposition supporters marched alongside other groups of the pro-democracy movement, calling for reforms and better wages.

Mathieu Kérékou threatened government workers who participated, but the protesters were adamant, calling for release of prisoners, fall of the government, and better wages. Civil servants joined protests in June, participating in large protests in Porto-Novo for the next few months amid threats of arrests. After months of nonstop intensive campaigns, police eventually opened fire on strikers, officially killing two protesters in August.

After the assaults, protesters staged different ways of protest, such as gatherings, public speeches, occupations, meetings and letters to government officials. After a break of protests and promises to meet their demands in October, another wave of anti-government strikes and demonstrations broke out, with the same methods from before. Professors, university students and teachers ended strikes in 1990, holding negotiations with the Mathieu Kérékou and his cabinet. Elections were held immediately in response to the protest movement.

== See also ==
- Revolutions of 1989
- 1989–1990 protests in Ivory Coast
