= List of ambassadors of Burundi to China =

Coordinates: 39.913697°N 116.437697°E

Ambassador of from Burundi to China
- Umuserukizi w'Uburundi mu Bushinwa
- Coat of arms of Burundi

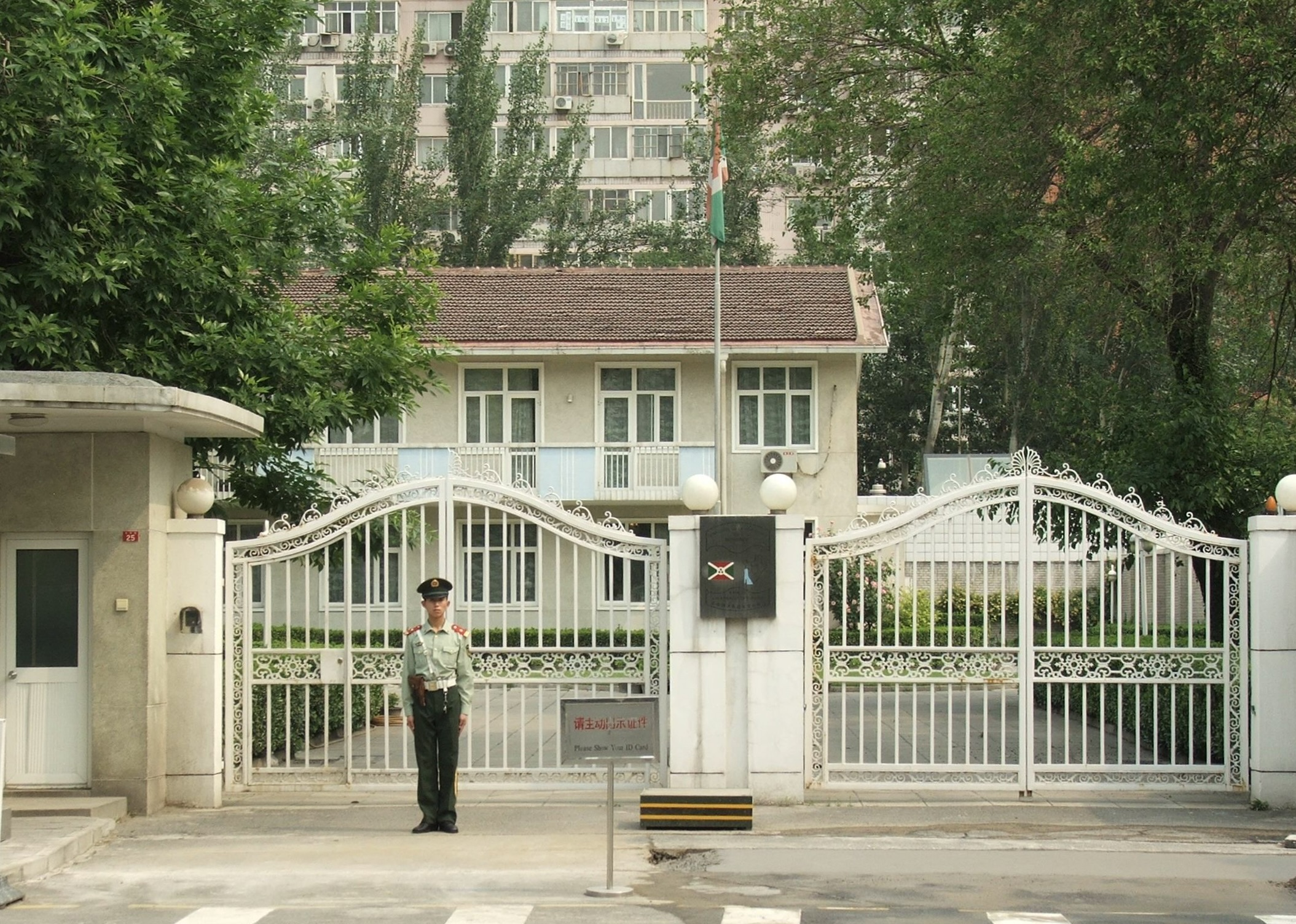
- Incumbent; Major General Télesphore Irambona since April 24, 2023
- Style: His/Her Excellency
- Residence: 25, Guang Hua Lu, Jian Guo Men Wai, Pékin 100600, Chine
- Appointer: Évariste Ndayishimiye
- Inaugural holder: Albert Shibura
- Formation: June 5, 1973
- Website: https://www.ambabupekin.mae.gov.bi/

The Burundian Ambassador to China is the official representative of the Government of Burundi to the Government of the People's Republic of China.

- The Ambassador, with residence in Beijing, is concurrently accredited to governments in Hanoi, Tokyo, Seoul, Manila and Canberra.

== History ==
- On December 21, 1963 Mao Zedong and Mwambutsa IV Bangiriceng of Burundi established diplomatic relations.
- In February 1965 Mwambutsa IV Bangiricenge of Burundi broke diplomatic relations with the government in Beijing.
- On October 31, 1971 Michel Micombero restored the diplomatic relations.

== List of representatives ==
Diplomatic accreditation	Ambassador	Observations	List of presidents of Burundi	Premier of the People's Republic of China	Term end
June 5, 1973	Albert Shibura		Michel Micombero	Zhou Enlai	December 8, 1975
January 22, 1976	Simon Sabimbona	(* 1941) January 31, 1980 ambassador in Washington, D.C.	Jean-Baptiste Bagaza	Hua Guofeng	1979
November 1979	Sylvere Gahungu	1974: director general in charge of the press and information.	Jean-Baptiste Bagaza	Hua Guofeng	1984
August 15, 1984	David Mpfubusa		Jean-Baptiste Bagaza	Zhao Ziyang	
December 20, 1985	Niyungeko Jonaphas		Jean-Baptiste Bagaza	Zhao Ziyang	
December 30, 1986	Basile Gateretse		Jean-Baptiste Bagaza	Zhao Ziyang	
1989	Gervais Ndikumagenge		Pierre Buyoya	Li Peng	
1990	Relwi Endikuwagenk		Pierre Buyoya	Li Peng	
October 3, 1990	Tharcisse Ntakibirora		Pierre Buyoya	Li Peng	
December 5, 1993	Procés Bigirimana		Pierre Buyoya	Li Peng	
1998	Pierre Ndikumagenge	Tutsi from Uprona, 2005: Minister of Agriculture and Livestock	Pierre Buyoya	Zhu Rongji	2003
November 14, 2007	Gabriel Sabushimike		Pierre Nkurunziza	Wen Jiabao	2020
March 15, 2011	Pascal Gasunzu		Pierre Nkurunziza	Wen Jiabao	2020
April 24, 2023	Major General Télesphore Irambona		Évariste Ndayishimiye	Li Qiang	
