= Pierre Claver Mbonimpa =

Burundian activist

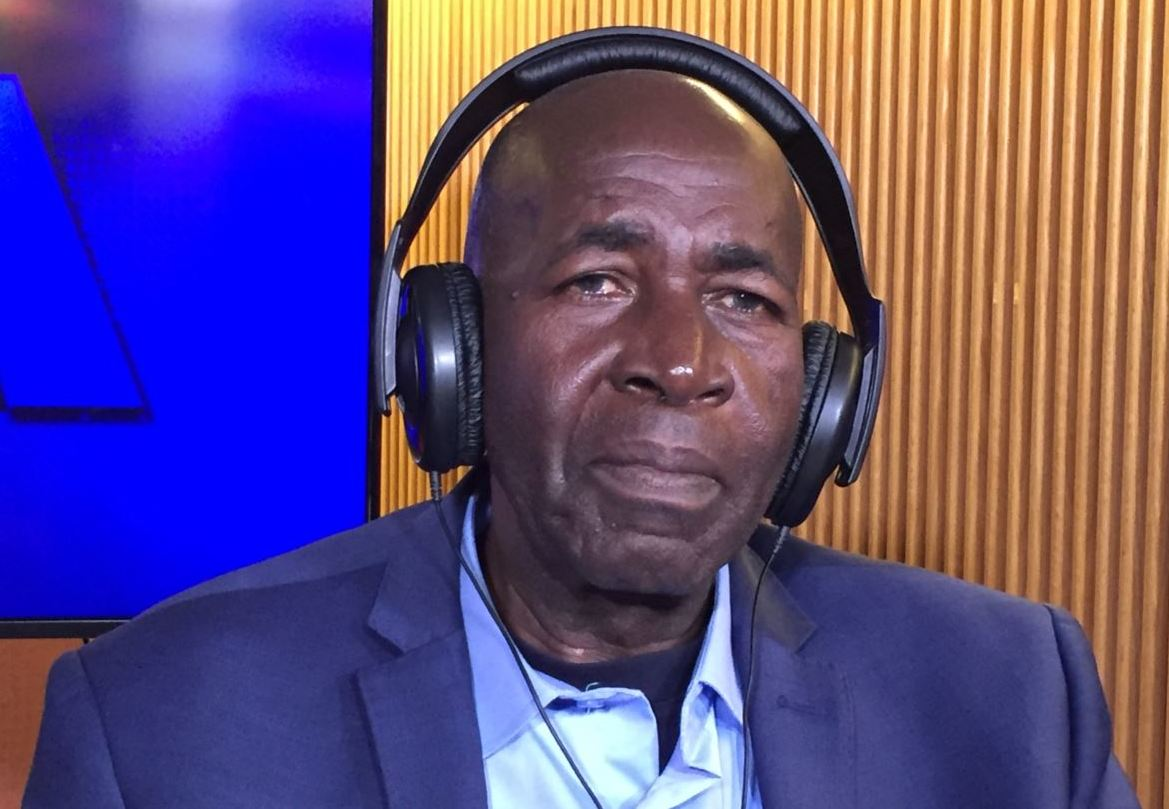
Pierre Claver Mbonimpa speaking with the Voice of America in 2017

Pierre Claver Mbonimpa is a Burundian human rights activist. He established the Association for the Protection of Human Rights and Incarcerated Persons (APRODH) in August 2001.

== Early life ==
Before Mbonimpa founded the APRODH, he worked as a public servant to the Economy and Finance Ministry for Burundi. He then served as a police officer for the Air and Customs Police; while at this position he was wrongfully accused and arrested for possession of an illegal weapon, and served two years in the Prison Centrale of Mpimba from 1994 to 1996. During those two years of imprisonment, Mbonimpa was frequently tortured and beaten, and it was this experience that inspired him to form APRODH.

In 1995, after a year behind bars, he had the idea to create a non-profit organisation, and cooperating with two other inmates, they wrote the articles for Association for the Defence of the Rights of Prisoners. After viewing the effects of prison life, and its abuse of all races and ethnic groups, the association does not discriminate along these lines either, and works to protect the rights of all prisoners.

== Human rights activism ==
Mbonimpa has created a multidimensional organisation APRODH, not only have they vigorously campaigned for the protection of the basic human rights of all prisoners, including the 9,000 or so people who have been awaiting trial for years in the over crowded prison system. They are also active in the prevention, of torture and sexual violence, as well as the protection of children in the criminal system.

Burundi does not have a juvenile detention/criminal system, and those above the age of 15 are tried as adults. Although legally children below this age limit should not be imprisoned, due to civil war and unrest, many become locked up anyway. At the Mpimpa prison male and female children cannot be held separately; this includes the children of the woman being held in the prison as well, most often after being born in the prison:

" There are also 24 babies and toddlers living in the jail, nearly all of whom were born inside. One prisoner tells the team that that some women are forced to have sex for money in order to survive, and become pregnant."

Mbonimpa has received many death threats for his stance and work on improving human rights, however he has not let that take away from his work in Burundi. He received the Martin Ennals Award for Human Rights Defenders in 2007 and the Civil Courage Prize in 2017.

=== Arrest and shooting ===
On May 15, 2014, Pierre Claver Mbonimpa was arrested again in Bujumbura. After questioning, prosecuting officials charged him with endangering internal and external state security for remarks made on the radio 10 days earlier, and using false documents. The remarks and documents relate to allegations that young Burundians were being armed and sent for military training in neighboring Democratic Republic of Congo. The arrest is considered as harassment and repression of human rights activists by Human Rights Watch.

Mbonimpa is an opponent of President Pierre Nkurunziza and opposed Nkurunziza's controversial bid for a third term in 2015. Mbonimpa was shot in Bujumbura on 3 August 2015 and "very badly wounded". Some believed that the attack was intended as retaliation for the assassination of General Adolphe Nshimirimana, a key Nkurunziza ally who was killed on the previous day. On 9 August, Mbonimpa, who had suffered a gunshot wound to the face, was flown to Belgium for further treatment.

Mbonimpa's son-in-law was killed in October 2015, and his son was killed on 6 November 2015, allegedly after being arrested.

== Awards ==
In 2007 Pierre Claver Mbonimpa was given Martin Ennals Award for Human Rights Defenders.

In 2011 Mbonimpa won Henry Dunant Award.

In 2016 Mbonimpa received Alison Des Forges Award for putting his life in the cause of human rights and for others.

In 2017 Train Foundation awarded Pierre Claver Civil Courage Prize for his bravery and human rights efforts.
