= Military ranks of Burundi =

The Military ranks of Burundi (French: Grades militaires du Burundi) are the military insignia used by the National Defence Force of Burundi.

== Commissioned officer ranks ==
The rank insignia of commissioned officers.

Rank group	General / flag officers				Senior officers			Junior officers
Burundi Army
Burundi Army	Général	Lieutenant-général	Général-major	Général de brigade	Colonel	Lieutenant-colonel	Major	Capitaine	Lieutenant	Sous-lieutenant
Burundi Army	Jenerai	Riyetena jenerai	Jenerai majoro	Jenerai wa birigade	Koroneri	Riyetena koroneri	Majoro	Kapitene	Riyetena	Suriyetena
Rank group	General / flag officers				Senior officers			Junior officers

== Other ranks ==
The rank insignia of non-commissioned officers and enlisted personnel.

Rank group	Senior NCOs						Junior NCOs		Enlisted
Burundi Army										No insignia
Burundi Army	Adjudant-major	Adjudant-chef	Adjudant	Première sergent major	Première sergent	Sergent	Caporal-chef	Caporal	Soldat de 1^{ère} classe	Soldat de 2^{ème} classe
Burundi Army	Ajida shefu	Ajida majoro	Ajida	Sereja majoro mu murwi wa mbere	Sereja mu murwi wa mbere	Sereja	Kaporari shefu	Kaporari	Umusoda wo mu murwi wa mbere	Umusoda wo mu murwi wa kabiri
Rank group	Senior NCOs						Junior NCOs		Enlisted
