= 2015 Burundian coup attempt =

Coup d'état attempt

Coordinates: 3.3816°S 29.3633°E

2015 Burundian coup d'état attempt
- Part of 2015 Burundian unrest
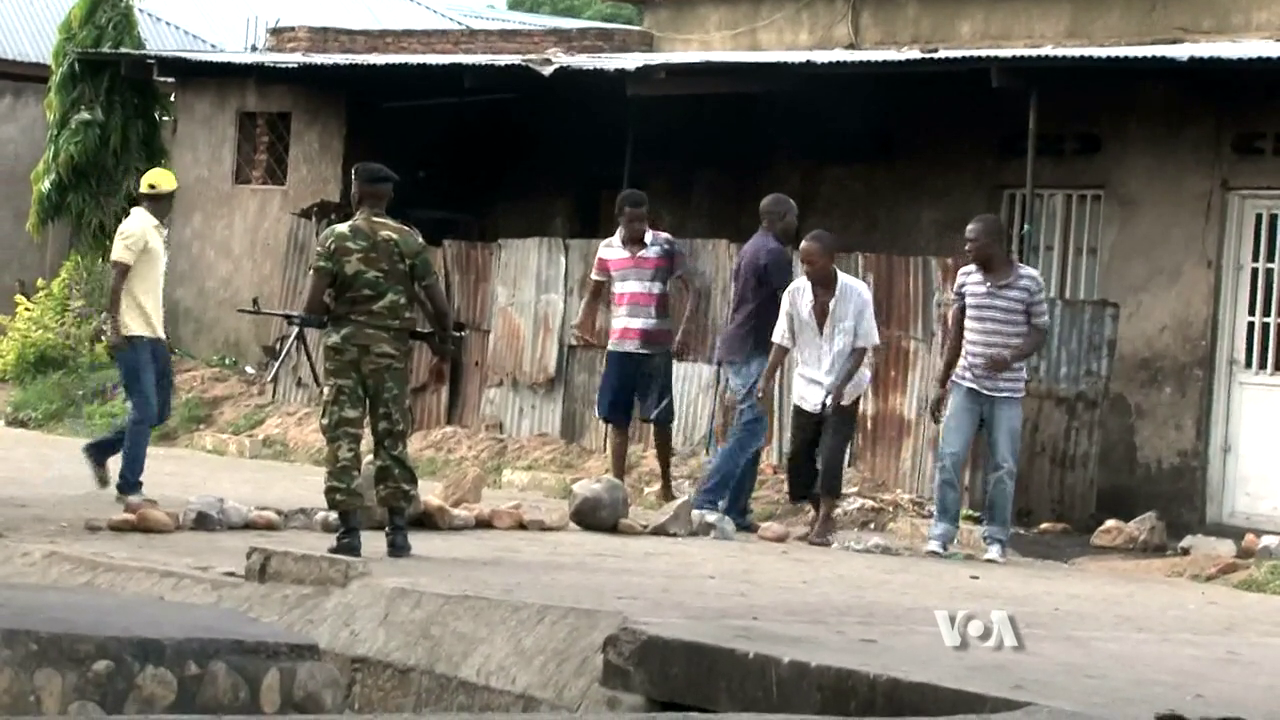
- A loyalist soldier after the failure of the coup, on 18 May 2015
| Date | 13–15 May 2015 |
| Location | Bujumbura , Burundi |
| Result | Coup attempt fails |

Belligerents
| Government of Burundi | Army faction |

Commanders and leaders
| Pierre Nkurunziza; Prime Niyongabo, Head of the Army | Godefroid Niyombare; Cyrille Ndayirukiye, Defence minister Zenon Ndabaneze, Police Commissioner |

On 13 May 2015, army general Godefroid Niyombare said that he was "dismissing President Pierre Nkurunziza" following the 2015 Burundian unrest. However, the presidency tweeted that the "situation is under control" and there is "no coup".

President Nkurunziza was at the time in neighbouring Tanzania attending the 13th Extraordinary Summit of the East African Community Heads of State, which had been convened to discuss the situation in Burundi.

Nkurunziza quickly attempted to return to Burundi, but he was apparently unable to do so because rebel soldiers had taken control of the airport in Bujumbura. Nevertheless, the head of the armed forces, Prime Niyongabo, said on state radio during the night of 13–14 May that the coup attempt had been defeated, and he called on rebel soldiers to surrender. Loyalist forces remained in control of the state radio and presidential palace. Shortly thereafter, "heavy fighting" was reported around the state radio as it was attacked by rebel soldiers.

Nkurunziza's office announced the president's successful return to Burundi on 14 May, as army and police loyal to Nkurunziza regained control of much of Bujumbura. On 15 May, the government said it arrested Niyombare and two other leaders of the coup and would charge them with mutiny.

== Sequence of events ==
On 13 May 2015, Major General Godefroid Niyombare declared a coup d'état, announcing on radio that "Nkurunziza is dismissed, his government is dismissed too," while President Nkurunziza was in Tanzania attending an emergency conference about the situation in the country. Niyombare, a former army chief of staff and head of intelligence, announced the coup along with senior officers in the army and police, including a former defense minister. After the announcement, crowds stormed into the streets of the capital in celebration and soldiers were seen guarding the state broadcaster's headquarters.

Nkurunziza attempted to fly back to Burundi, but his plane was reportedly turned back to Tanzania. AFP reported that rebel soldiers had seized control of Bujumbura International Airport. Nevertheless, the head of the armed forces, Prime Niyongabo, declared from the RTNB state radio complex during the night of 13–14 May that the coup attempt had been defeated, and he called on rebel soldiers to surrender. Loyalist forces remained in control of the state radio and presidential palace. Shortly thereafter, AFP reported heavy fighting around the RTNB state radio complex as it was attacked by rebel soldiers. In the wake of the fighting, the station remained in loyalist hands.

Reuters reported that a journalist at the state broadcaster said there was "heavy gunfire" around the station in the capital. Reuters also heard from witnesses that two private radio stations that broadcast Niyombare's announcement had been attacked by men in police uniforms. Radio Publique Africaine was set ablaze. Five soldiers were reported killed in clashes that the government said retook control of the sites. All in all, five independent Burundian news agencies were completely or partially destroyed: Radio Bonesha, Radio Isanganiro, Radio Publique Africaine, Rema FM and Radio-Télévision Renaissance.

African Union chairperson Nkosazana Dlamini-Zuma stated that she "condemns in the strongest terms today's coup attempt" and called for a "return to constitutional order and urges all stakeholders to exercise utmost restraint." Nkurunziza thanked loyal soldiers who he said were "putting things in order" and said that rebel soldiers would be forgiven if they surrendered.

In the hours that followed the failed attacks on the state broadcaster, the coup appeared to begin collapsing. Later in the day on 14 May, Nkurunziza announced that he had returned to Burundi, although his specific location was not given for security reasons. He congratulated "the army and the police for their patriotism" and "above all the Burundian people for their patience". One of the coup leaders, General Cyrille Ndayirukiye, said that "our movement has failed" due to "overpowering military determination to support the system in power". He also suggested that soldiers backing the coup would not continue fighting, saying the coup leaders "don't want to be responsible for leading those who have followed us to their deaths."

Early on 15 May, Niyombare said that he and the other coup leaders had decided to surrender to government forces. Meanwhile, Nkurunziza returned to Bujumbura. Speaking on state radio later in the day, he said that there was "peace in the whole country" and vowed that anyone trying to stir up unrest would fail. The government also disclosed that Niyombare was still at large, contradicting an earlier statement that he had been captured.

On 16 May 2015, eighteen people, including former defence minister General Cyrille Ndayirukiye and police commissioners Zenon Ndabaneze and Hermenegilde Nimenya, appeared in court. Relatives claimed that they had been beaten while in custody. Ndayirukiye pleaded guilty to trying to overthrow the government, and he was sentenced to life imprisonment on 15 January 2016. At the same time, three other generals received the same penalty, while nine defendants received sentences of 30 years and eight defendants received sentences of five years. Seven of the defendants were acquitted.

== Aftermath ==
Due to the destruction of all five major independent Burundian news broadcasters during the coup, the Burundian populace had very little access to information about their country. According to the Broadcasting Board of Governors website, the only significant news source Burundians had as of May 14 was Voice of America's Kirundi/Kinyarwanda service. Burundi's only independent newspaper, Iwacu, suspended publishing for a week but thereafter resumed. As the situation unfolded international media sources returned to Burundi, but the government remained hostile to journalists, dealing with them "as if they were coup plotters." According to rights activist Innocent Muhozi, the head of the Burundian Press Observatory, “They want to break the journalists’ morale. There is harassment, phone calls, threats, blacklists." Four months after the coup attempt, The East African reported that "Burundi private media [was] still off air."

On 18 May 2015 President Nkurunziza dismissed Minister of Defence Pontien Gaciyubwenge, Minister of Foreign Affairs Laurent Kavakure and Minister of Trade Marie-Rose Nizigiyimana.
