= Alexis Sinduhije =

Burundian journalist

- Born: May 5, 1967 (age 59)
- Occupations: journalist, politician
- Political party: Movement for Solidarity and Democracy
- Awards: CPJ International Press Freedom Award (2004); Time 100 (2009)

Alexis Sinduhije (born 5 May 1967) is a Burundian journalist and politician. After founding Radio Publique Africaine during the Burundi Civil War, Sinduhije received a CPJ International Press Freedom Award and was named to the Time 100 list of most influential people. In 2007, he left journalism to run for president, but was arrested in 2008 on a charge of "insulting the president," Pierre Nkurunziza, drawing protests on his behalf from the U.S., U.K., and Amnesty International. He was found not guilty and released in 2009. The film Kamenge, Northern Quarters follows Sinduhije before, during, and after his incarceration.

== Background ==
From 1991 to 1993, Sinduhije was a news reporter for National Radio and Television of Burundi and then became the chief news editor for La Semaine, an independent weekly newspaper that was shut down by the National Army during a military coup. He worked at Studio Ijambo, a 10 full-time journalists (Hutu and Tutsi correspondents are equally represented) independent radio production studio in Bujumbura providing programming to the BBC, Reuters, Associated Press, Agence France-Presse, and to national radio. His accomplishments as a journalist were recognised by Harvard University who invited him to the Kennedy School as a Shorenstein Fellow in 1997.

During the ethnically divisive Burundi Civil War, Sinduhije, who is a Tutsi, adopted a Hutu war orphan.

== Radio Publique Africaine ==
In 2001, Sinduhije founded Radio Publique Africaine (RPA), along with Samantha Power, as a means of bringing about peace between his fellow Tutsi and the Hutu in his often war-torn country. He thought of the idea while working at the state radio station. RPA's stated purpose is "to humanize relations between the ethnic groups." Sinduhije later stated that it was initially hard to find donors for the project, given the regional distrust of public radio after the role that the Rwandan public radio station Radio Télévision Libre des Mille Collines had played in that nation's recent genocide.

Sinduhije's house was broken into in February 2003 and his security guard murdered in apparent retaliation for the station's reporting. The incident led Amnesty International to call on Burundian authorities to guarantee Sinduhije's safety and that of other journalists. The government of Burundi briefly banned the station on 17 September 2003 for broadcasting an interview with a spokesman for Agathon Rwasa's rebel group, the National Liberation Forces. However, other stations refused to broadcast news in solidarity until the ban was removed, and the government allowed the station to resume transition within three days.

For Sinduhije's work with the station, he was honored with the 2004 International Press Freedom Award of the Committee to Protect Journalists (CPJ). In 2009, Time named him to its Time 100, an "annual list of the world's most influential people".

== Presidential candidacy ==
Sinduhije left the station in December 2007 in order to pursue a political career, announcing his candidacy for the 2010 presidential elections.

On 3 November 2008, Sinduhije was arrested for holding an unauthorized meeting. After nine days of detention at Mpimba Central Prison, he was additionally charged with "insulting the president", Pierre Nkurunziza, based on documents the police had confiscated. The BBC reported that his detention was widely viewed as politically motivated, given the impending presidential election. The United States Embassy in Burundi described Sinduhije's arrest as "unacceptable" and demanded his release. The British government also noted its concern, stating that the arrest threatened "the ability of Burundians to exercise their civil and political rights". Amnesty International designated him a prisoner of conscience, "held solely for expressing his political views", and called for his immediate release. Burundi's ambassador to the United States responded that the Sinduhije's arrest was unconnected to the election and that Burundi was "committed to human rights".

Sinduhije was found not guilty on 13 March 2009 and released from prison. Following a series of candidate withdrawals and boycotts of a poll that opposition candidates accused of being rigged, Nkurunziza stood unopposed and was re-elected with 91.62 percent of the vote.

== Sanctions and alleged involvement in rebel activity ==
In 2010s he was subject to US and UN sanctions for the violence instigated by members of his party.

In course of the Burundian unrest (2015–2018), the Burundian government accused Sinduhije and his party, the Movement for Solidarity and Democracy, of organizing the "Resistance for the Rule of Law in Burundi" (RED-Tabara) rebel group (a group based in congo at the moment). However, members of RED-Tabara denied that Sinduhije was leading them.
