= Adolphe Nshimirimana =

Burundian military general

- Born: September 2, 1964; Gitega, Burundi
- Died: 2 August 2015 (aged 50); Bujumbura, Burundi
- Resting place: Bujumbura-Marie, Burundi

Adolphe Nshimirimana (September 12, 1964 – August 2, 2015) was a Burundian military general who served as army chief of staff, as well as a senior presidential adviser for internal security and close political ally of President Pierre Nkurunziza. Observers viewed Lt. Gen. Nshimirimana as Nkurunziza's de facto internal security chief as head of the National Intelligence Service. He was born at Nyabiraba in Gishubi Commune, Gitega Province.

In 2015, President Pierre Nkurunziza announced his intention to seek a third term, leading to widespread opposition and unrest. Nshimirimana helped to defeat the attempted coup d'état against Nkurunziza in May 2015 and was seen as the mastermind behind the crackdown on opposition protesters. Human Rights Watch accused Nshimirimana of becoming "one of the key hard-liners around the president." Nshimirimana's influence increased as the unrest and street protests against Nkurunziza continued in mid-2015. According to Carina Tertsakian of Human Rights Watch, "Despite or perhaps because of his brutal reputation, Adolphe was generally seen as untouchable, with no one in a position of power daring, or even suggesting, holding him to account."

Nshimirimana was killed and three others were seriously injured in a rocket attack on his car at Gare du Nord (North Station) in Bujumbura at 8.30 a.m. on August 2, 2015.

On August 4, 2015, Nkurunziza ordered the police to find the murderers of Nshimirimana, within ten days. He was considered the right-hand man of the president.

On December 13, 2016, Burundi police announced that one of the suspects in Nshimirimana's assassination escaped from prison by killing a prison guard.
