= Marie-Rose Nizigiyimana =

Burundian politician (born 1966)

Minister of Trade, Industry, Post and Tourism
- In office 18 February 2014 – 18 May 2015
- President: Pierre Nkurunziza
- Succeeded by: Irina Inantore

Personal details
- Born: 1966 (age 59–60) Kayanza Province, Burundi
- Party: Union for National Progress
- Education: University of Burundi
- Occupation: Politician

Marie-Rose Nizigiyimana (born 1966) is a Burundian politician. She held the post of Minister of Trade, Industry, Post and Tourism in the government of President Pierre Nkurunziza from 18 February 2014 until she was fired on 18 May 2015.

== Biography ==
Nizigiyimana was born in 1966 in the community of Rango in Kayanza Province, Burundi. She obtained a history degree at the University of Burundi, and she worked as a teacher since 1993.

Nizigiyimana has been member of the political party Union for National Progress since 1993. On 18 February 2014, she was made Minister of Trade, Industry, Post and Tourism after a cabinet reshuffle.

She was fired on 18 May 2015, shortly after a failed coup d'état. Nizigiyimana had received criticism over fuel shortages in the country. She was replaced by Irina Inantore. By 2017 she worked as permanent secretary at the Ministry of Public Works.
