= Cyrille Ndayirukiye =

Burundian politician and Army general (1954–2021)

Minister of National Defence of Burundi
- In office January 2000 – 8 November 2002
- Preceded by: Alfred Nkurunziza
- Succeeded by: Vincent Niyungeko

Personal details
- Born: 8 July 1954 Kiganda, Ruanda-Urundi
- Died: 25 April 2021 (aged 66) Gitega, Burundi
- Party: UPRONA
- Occupation: Army general

Cyrille Ndayirukiye (8 July 1954 – 25 April 2021) was a Burundian politician and Army general. He served as Minister of National Defence of Burundi from 2000 to 2002. He was also one of the main anti-government militants in the 2015 coup attempt.

== Imprisonment and death ==
As one of the main soldiers involved in the 2015 coup attempt in Burundi, he was consequently sentenced to Life imprisonment in January 2016.

Ndayirukiye subsequently died in prison on April 21, 2021.
