= Minister of National Defence (Burundi) =

Minister of National Defence and Veterans Affairs
- Ministre de la Défense Nationale et des Anciens Combattants
- Coat of arms of Burundi
- Incumbent; Marie Chantal Nijimbere since 5 August 2025
- Ministry of National Defence and Veterans Affairs
- Abbreviation: MDNAC
- Member of: Council of Ministers (Burundi)
- Reports to: President
- Formation: 1 July 1962
- First holder: Nicayenzi Zénon
- Website: www.mdnac.gov.bi

The Minister of National Defence and Veterans Affairs of Burundi is the senior political appointee responsible for the National Defence Forces of Burundi.

In 2015 Maj General Pontien Gaciyubwenge was succeeded by a civilian. He was replaced as Minister by Emmanuel Ntahomvukiye.

== List of ministers ==
The ministers have been:

No.	Portrait	Name (Birth–Death)	Term of office		
No.	Portrait	Name (Birth–Death)	Took office	Left office	Time in office
1	Zénon Nicayenzi	Zénon Nicayenzi (born 1934)	1 July 1962	1963	0–1 years
2	Michel Micombero	Lieutenant general Michel Micombero (1940–1983)	1963	1976	12–13 years
3	Jean-Baptiste Bagaza	Colonel; Jean-Baptiste Bagaza (1946–2016)	1976	1987	10–11 years
4	Pierre Buyoya	Major; Pierre Buyoya (1949–2020)	1987	1988	0–1 years
5	Léonidas Maregarege	Colonel; Léonidas Maregarege	1988	1993	4–5 years
6	Charles Ntakije	Colonel; Charles Ntakije	1993	1994	0–1 years
7	Gédéon Fyiroko	Colonel; Gédéon Fyiroko	1994	1994	0 years
8	Firmin Sinzoyiheba	Colonel; Firmin Sinzoyiheba	1994	1997	2–3 years
9	Alfred Nkurunziza	Colonel; Alfred Nkurunziza	1997	2000	2–3 years
10	Cyrille Ndayirukiye	Major General; Cyrille Ndayirukiye (1954–2021)	1997	2000	2–3 years
11	Vincent Niyungeko	Lieutenant General; Vincent Niyungeko	2002	2005	2–3 years
12	Germain Niyoyankana	Lieutenant General; Germain Niyoyankana (born 1955)	2005	2010	4–5 years
13	Pontien Gaciyubwenge	Major General; Pontien Gaciyubwenge (born 1956)	2010	2015	4–5 years
14	Emmanuel Ntawomvukiye	Civilian; Emmanuel Ntawomvukiye	May 2015	June 2020	4–5 years
15	Alain Tribert Mutabazi	Civilian; Alain Tribert Mutabazi	June 2020	August 2025	4–5 years
16	Marie Chantal Nijimbere	Civilian; Marie Chantal Nijimbere (born 1983)	August 2025	Incumbent	0–1 years
