= Radio Publique Africaine =

Radio station in Burundi

African Public Radio (Radio Publique Africaine or RPA) is a public radio station in Burundi. In 2009, Le Monde described it as "one of the most widely listened-to stations in the country". The station's motto is "la voix des sans-voix" ("the voice of the voiceless").

Alexis Sinduhije founded the station in 2001 with the goal of encouraging peace between the Hutu and Tutsi ethnic groups in the later years of the Burundi Civil War, hiring ex-combatants of both ethnic groups as reporters. Sinduhije later stated that it was initially hard to find donors for the project, given the regional distrust of public radio after the role that the Rwandan public radio station Radio Télévision Libre des Mille Collines had played in that nation's recent genocide.

In February 2003, Sinduhije's house was broken into and his security guard murdered in apparent retaliation for the station's reporting. The incident led Amnesty International to call on Burundian authorities to guarantee Sinduhije's safety and that of other journalists. The government of Burundi briefly banned the station on 17 September 2003 for broadcasting an interview with a spokesman for Agathon Rwasa's rebel group, the National Liberation Forces. However, other stations refused to broadcast news in solidarity until the ban was removed, and the government allowed the station to resume transition within three days.

For Sinduhije's work with the station, he was honored with the 2004 International Press Freedom Award of the Committee to Protect Journalists (CPJ). In 2009, Time named him to its Time 100, an "annual list of the world's most influential people". Sinduhije left the station in December 2007 in order to pursue a political career.

In July and August 2011, RPA editor Bob Rugurika was summoned five times by magistrates asking him to "correct" the station's reporting that a Burundian government official had been implicated in a 1996 massacre by a United Nations report, which the CPJ described as part of a pattern of "harassment of independent journalists who report critically about the administration". Reporters from an RPA station in Ngozi were also summoned to court.

In 2015, the government shut down Radio Publique Africaine during the 2015 Burundian protests and blocked instant messaging services and social media sites it says are used to co-ordinate protests. Reporters Without Borders condemned the restrictions on press and citizen communication. During the unrest, the station was set ablaze after broadcasting opposition announcements. The BBC reports that the station's building was burnt down.
