= Jean Bikomagu =

- Died: August 15, 2015; Bujumbura, Burundi
- Cause of death: Assassination
- Resting place: Bujumbura, Burundi

Jean Bikomagu (died August 15, 2015) was a Burundian colonel, military officer and former army chief. Bikomagu held the position of Army Chief of Staff during the Burundian Civil War (1993–2005). Burundi's army was dominated by ethnic Tutsis during the civil war.

In 1992 Bikomagu served as the commander of the Cibitoke Army Camp. President Melchior Ndadaye appointed him as Army Chief of Staff in 1993. President Pierre Buyoya dismissed him on 21 August 1996. Bikomagu was shot and killed by assailants on August 15, 2015, as he was arriving at his home in the Kinindo district of southern Bujumbura. His daughter was seriously wounded in the attack. His assassination, and other killings in Burundi, raised concerns that the at the time ongoing 2015 Burundian unrest could have been escalating.
