= 2020 Ivorian protests =

Anti-government protests in Ivory Coast

The 2020 Ivorian protests were a series of massive rioting and increasingly violent street demonstrations adding to the growing massive street protests and civil disorder sweeping Ivory Coast. The protests were against the results and the re-run of president Alassane Ouattara. These protests were major anti-government opposition protests, and consisted of supporters of opposition protests in Abidjan and other cities in support of democratic reforms. Protesters used nonviolent tactics but met with intense violence back from the riot police.

== Background ==
The protests surrounded president's Alassane Ouattara bid for a third term in running for the 2020 Ivorian presidential election, which reignited weeks of violent demonstrations that left six dead. As the popular uprising intensified, the government began to ignore and target opposition members and opposition supporters, calling them criminals and targeting a violent crackdown on the demonstrators and even burning the homes of opposition member participating in the 31 October elections.

== Protests ==
Pro-democracy riots first began as strikes in March and April, against lockdown in Cote d’Ivoire as a result of the COVID-19 pandemic. Anti-Alassane Ouattara protests rocked the country, mainly the Christian south, sparking fears of a civil war. Thousands rallied on 12–21 September in Abidjan, which is where all the protests began and were taking place.

After the civil unrest and opposition protests, the government crackdown became severe, with at least 85 killed in the protest movement altogether. Protesters gathered and called for free elections and the resignation of president Alassane Ouattara. The violence that marred the nation was one of the largest opposition demonstrations and bloodiest actions since the 2010-2011 Ivorian crisis.

Hundreds of thousands took to the streets in popular civil disobedience in October, before the 2020 Ivorian presidential election. Election protests erupted and bloody crackdowns and vigilante mob attacks were carried out against protesters as the opposition called on strikes to be held nationwide after the results of the election were announced. After 5 days of violent clashes and intense remonstrances, 30+ protesters were killed. Protests ceased shortly thereafter.

== See also ==
- Second Ivorian Civil War
