= 2005 Burundian constitutional referendum =

Constitutional referendum in Burundi

- 28 February 2005

Results
Choice	Votes	%
Yes	2,577,883	92.27%
No	216,060	7.73%
Valid votes	2,793,943	97.98%
Invalid or blank votes	57,676	2.02%
Total votes	2,851,619	100.00%
Registered voters/turnout	3,413,624	83.54%

A constitutional referendum was held in Burundi on 28 February 2005. The new constitution was approved by 92% of voters.

== Proposed constitution ==
The proposed new constitution guaranteed representation for both Hutu and Tutsi ethnic groups by setting out ethnic quotas for parliament, government and the army, which had been dominated by Tutsis since independence;

- The ethnic composition of the National Assembly would be set at 60% Hutu and 40% Tutsi, with three additional seats reserved for Twas.
- In the Senate, seats would be split 50-50 between Hutus and Tutsis, with three seats reserved for Twas.
- Military posts would be shared equally between the two groups.
- The President of the Republic is elected by universal direct suffrage for a mandate of five years renewable one time.

== Campaign ==
Most political parties urged a "Yes" vote in the poll, but some Tutsi parties urged a "No" vote, stating that the new constitution doesn't give Tutsis enough guarantees.

== Results ==
Choice	Votes	%
For	2,607,852	92.02
Against	226,235	7.98
Invalid/blank votes	60,285	–
Total	2,894,372	100
Registered voters/turnout	3,132,494	92.40
Source: African Election Archive
