= Godefroid Niyombare =

Burundian military officer

General Godefroid Niyombare

Ambassador of Burundi to Kenya
- In office February 2014 – December 2014
- Preceded by: Ezéchiel Nibigira
- Succeeded by: Béatrice Kankindi

Personal details
- Born: 18 October 1969 (age 57)

Military service
- Allegiance: Burundi
- Branch/service: Burundi Army
- Years of service: until 2015
- Rank: Major general

Godefroid Niyombare (born 1969) is a Burundian military officer who led a coup attempt against President Pierre Nkurunziza on 13 May 2015. At the time of the coup attempt, Niyombare was a Major General. He previously served as military chief of staff and as Burundi's Ambassador to Kenya, and was head of the National Intelligence Service (Service national de renseignement, SNR) from December 2014, when he replaced Adolphe Nshimirimana, until February 2015, when he was dismissed by Nkurunziza and replaced by Major-General Moïse Pasteur Bucumi.

== Military career ==
During the Burundi Civil War, he was a Hutu commander in the CNDD-FDD rebel group and was involved in peace talks with the FNL rebel group.

After the civil war, Niyombare was a top army officer under President Nkurunziza, who nominated him as army chief of staff. Niyombare was confirmed in that post by a vote of the Senate on 16 April 2009. He was the first Hutu to head the army.

During the African Union Mission to Somalia, Niyombare oversaw military efforts, with 4,400 Burundian troops deployed in March 2011. Niyombare said on 14 March 2011 that the soldiers had been deployed a week before.

In late 2014, Niyombare was appointed as head of the National Intelligence Service (SNR). He served in that post for only three months, as he was dismissed by Nkurunziza in February 2015. His dismissal occurred after the leaking of a 10-page memo he wrote arguing against Nkurunziza's controversial plans to run for a third term.

=== May 2015 coup attempt ===
In the midst of protests against Nkurunziza's bid for a third term, which many viewed as unconstitutional, Niyombare announced from a private radio station on 13 May 2015 that he was deposing the President, who was at the time at talks in neighboring Tanzania. Speaking alongside other top officers, he blamed Nkurunziza for causing the situation by pursuing his controversial presidential candidacy. On the streets, people opposed to Nkurunziza celebrated the announcement, and despite government denials, initial reports suggested that Niyombare's coup had been successful. Nkurunziza promptly tried to return home, but was apparently unable to do so due to rebel control of the Bujumbura airport.

Nkurunziza loyalists resisted and declared that the coup had been defeated. On 14 May, rebel soldiers attacked the state radio and television broadcaster, but they were repelled by loyalist forces. In the wake of this failure, the coup crumbled. Early on 15 May, Niyombare said that he and the other coup leaders had decided to surrender to government forces. Niyombare said that he hoped the loyalists would not kill them. The government announced that he had been captured but that statement was retracted later that day.
