= Germain Niyoyankana =

Burundian former army officer and politician

Germain Niyoyankana (born 1955) is a Burundian former army officer and politician who was Minister of National Defense from 2005 to 2010. He held the highest military rank in Burundi as lieutenant general. Before that, he was the chief of staff.

In the frame of the implementation of the Peace Process following the 1993-2005 Burundi Civil War, Niyoyankana as the top army commander, is credited with his ability to have peacefully integrated former Hutu rebels into the army historically dominated by Tutsis.
