= Burundi National Defence Force =

Combined military forces of Burundi

- Force de Défense Nationale du Burundi (French); Urwego rw'ukwivuna abansi rw'Uburundi (Kirundi)
- Flag of Burundi

- Coat of arms of Burundi
- Founded: 23 January 1965; 61 years ago
- Current form: 31 December 2004; 21 years ago
- Service branches: Ground Force; Air Force; Naval Force; Reserve and Development Support Force (FRAD)
- Headquarters: Bujumbura, Burundi
- Website: Official website

Leadership
- Commander-in-chief: Évariste Ndayishimiye
- Minister of National Defense & War Veterans: Marie Chantal Nijimbere
- Chief of the Defence Staff: General Prime Niyongabo

Personnel
- Military age: 18–64
- Active personnel: 30,050 (2024)

Expenditure
- Budget: $US 64 million (2011)
- Percent of GDP: 3.7% (2011)

Industry
- Foreign suppliers: China; Russia; South Africa; India; Egypt; European Union; Turkey

Related articles
- History: Burundian Civil War; First Congo War; Second Congo War; Somali Civil War; African Union Mission in Somalia; Central African Republic Civil War; MINUSCA; War in Darfur; United Nations–African Union Mission in Darfur; Kivu conflict; M23 campaign (2022–present)
- Ranks: Military ranks of Burundi

The Burundi National Defence Force (French: Force de Défense Nationale du Burundi; FDNB; Kirundi: Urwego rw'ukwivuna abansi rw'Uburundi) is the military of Burundi. A general staff commands the armed forces, consisting of a joint staff; a training staff, and a logistics staff. Naval and aviation commands exist, as well as specialised units.

== History ==
=== Independence and early history (1962–1993) ===
Under Belgian colonial rule, the mandatory status of Ruanda-Urundi established limits on the recruitment of Barundi for military service. Instead, Ruanda-Urundi was garrisoned by a small unit of the Force Publique recruited in the Belgian Congo which combined its military role with the role of gendarmerie. Its members were popularly known as Bamina in Burundi, after the large military base at Kamina in the Congo. Amid the Congo's independence, the Belgian colonial administration formed the Burundian National Guard (Garde Nationale Burundaise) in 1960. It consisted of 650 men, recruited equally from the Hutu and Tutsi ethnic groups (though the Tutsi mostly consisted of those from the Hima subgroup). When Burundi became independent in 1962 the force was renamed the Burundian National Army (Armée Nationale Burundaise) and assumed a purely military function. The gendarmarie function was allocated to a civilian authority called the National Gendarmerie (Gendarmerie nationale) after independence in 1962, though this became part of the army on 7 March 1967.

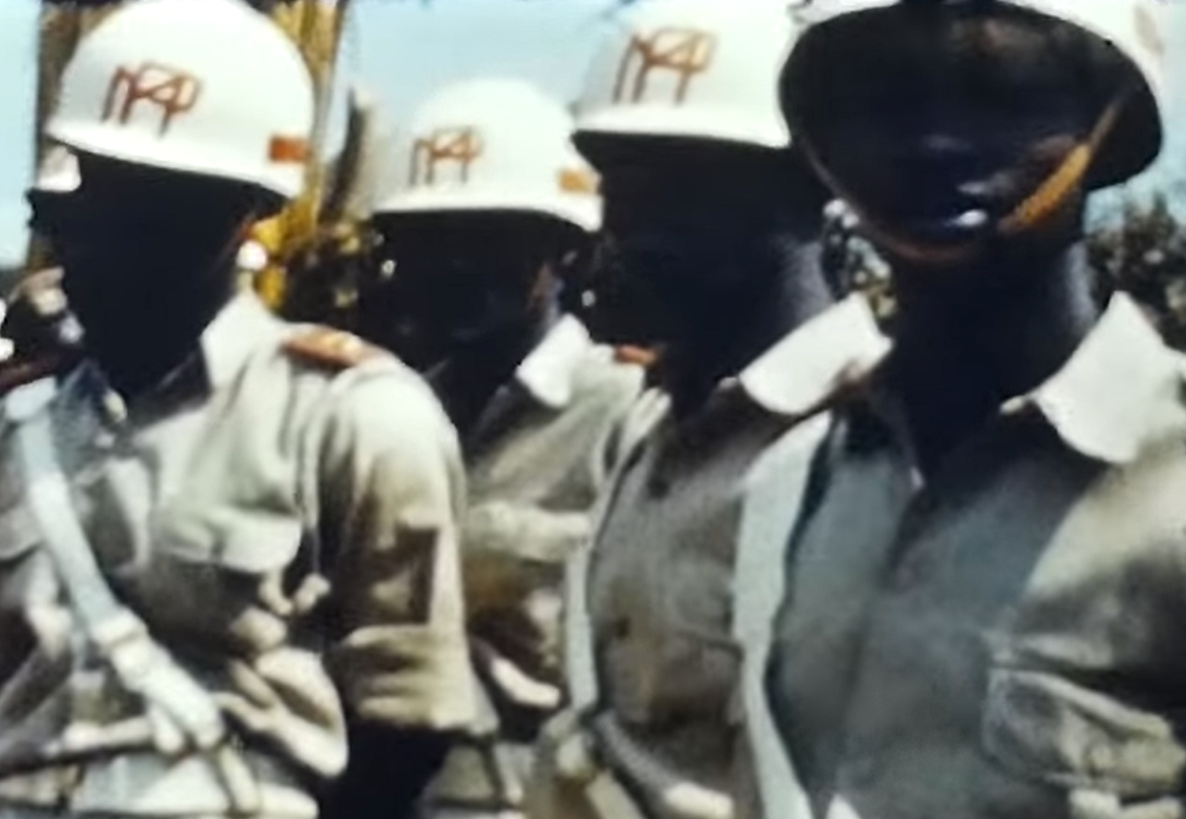
Burundian soldiers (wearing M1 helmets) at the coronation ceremony of King Ntare V, 1 September 1966

Burundi became independent on 1 July 1962 with the army organised into eight platoons. A coup attempt in October 1965 led by the Hutu-dominated police was carried out but failed. The Tutsi dominated army, then led by Tutsi officer Captain Michel Micombero purged Hutu from their ranks and carried out reprisal attacks which ultimately claimed the lives of up to 5,000 people in a predecessor to Burundian genocides. Micombero then became prime minister.

King Mwambutsa IV, who had fled the country during the October 1965 coup attempt, was deposed by a coup in July 1966 and his teenage son, Crown Prince Charles Ndizeye, claimed the throne as King Ntare V. Later that same year, Prime Minister, then-Colonel, Michel Micombero, carried out another coup in November 1966, this time deposing Ntare, abolishing the monarchy and declaring the nation a republic. His one-party government was effectively a military dictatorship. As president, Micombero became an advocate of African socialism and received support from China. He imposed a staunch regime of law and order and sharply repressed Hutu militarism. After Micombero's coup d’etat which deposed the monarchy, he became the first general in Burundian history. He was also commissioned by the National Council of the Revolution (French: Conseil National de la Révolution (CNR)), and made a Lieutenant Général. In his turn, Micombero raised Thomas Ndabemeye to the grade of Major General. They were the sole generals of the First Republic.

In 1972 the Tutsi-dominated Burundi Army and government carried out a series of mass killings, the Ikiza, often characterised as a genocide, primarily against educated and elite Hutus who lived in the country. Conservative estimates place the death toll of the event between 100,000 and 150,000 killed, while some estimates of the death toll go as high as 300,000. This included a purge of all Hutus and some politically unfavorable Tutsis from the military, shrinking it to about 2,300 members. On 30 December 1974 a naval division was created.

In 1981–82 the IISS estimated that the Burundian armed forces were 6,000 strong, with 2 infantry battalions, 1 airborne battalion, 1 commando battalion, and an armoured car company. The same estimate was repeated in the 1988–89 edition except that the strength figure had been dropped to 5,500.

=== The Civil War and aftermath ===
In 1993, Hutu President Melchior Ndadaye was elected in the 1 June presidential election and was sworn in on 10 July.

On 21 October, a coup attempt was staged by a Tutsi–dominated National Defence Force faction, led by Chief of Staff Lt. Col. Jean Bikomagu, ex-President Jean-Baptiste Bagaza, and former interior minister François Ngeze. The coup attempt resulted in the assassination of Ndadaye and numerous other casualties. Following the coup, the Committee of Public Salvation (CSP) was created as the ruling junta, and François Ngeze (a prominent Hutu member of UPRONA) was installed as the new president. Ngeze himself condemned the assassination of Ndadaye. Faced with widespread condemnation, the Army leaders urged civilian politicians to resume control. Consequently, Prime Minister Sylvie Kinigi (who took refuge in the French embassy with other senior government figures) was installed as Acting President on 27 October.

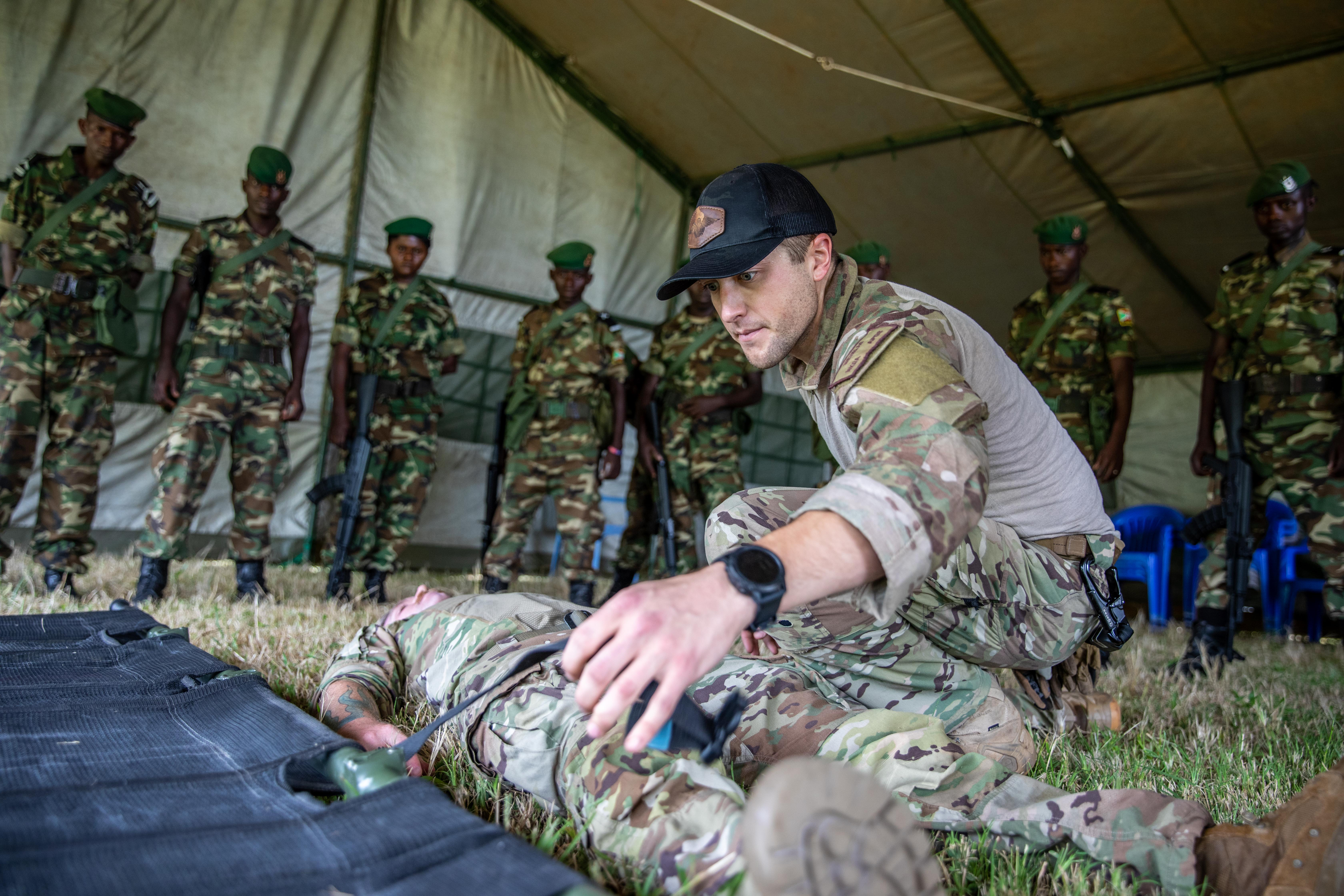
A U.S. Air Force Pararescueman, assigned to 82nd Expeditionary Rescue Squadron, demonstrates proper use of a litter to Burundi National Defence Force (BNDF) Soldiers, April 5, 2024, at Mudubugu, Burundi. Visiting U.S. Soldiers of the East Africa Response Force, along with other service members, joined their BNDF counterparts for a full day of demonstrations and practical exercises focused on emergency field medical care and casualty evacuation. (U.S. Army photo by Sgt.Joshua DuRant)

The 1996 UN inquiry names three units - para 122-3 indicates that at the time of the October coup, the 2e Commando were the presidential guard and the 1er Parachutiste and 11e Blinde were the units involved in the coup. (Para 115 notes that some officers of the 2e Commando were previously involved in an attempted coup in July, before Ndadaye was sworn in, but presumably by October the unit was thought to be loyal). In addition, U.S. Ambassador Bob Krueger mentions members of the 1st Parachute Battalion being active during the coup in his book.

The coup attempted sparked the Burundian Civil War, which lasted from 1993 to 2005, killing an estimated 300,000 people. The Arusha Accords ended 12 years of war and stopped decades of ethnic killings. The 2005 constitution provided guaranteed representation for both Hutu and Tutsi, and 2005 parliamentary election that led to Pierre Nkurunziza, from the Hutu FDD, becoming president.

According to a 2004 report by Child Soldiers International, Burundi's military used conscripted child soldiers. Children in military service were subject to military courts which fell short of international law standards.

The armed forces have deployed significant numbers of troops to the African Union Mission in Somalia since c. 2007. On February 1, 2007 Burundi committed to the mission, pledging up to 1,000 troops. By March 27, it was confirmed that 1700 Burundian troops would be sent to Somalia. In 2011 the IISS estimated that three Burundian battalions were deployed there.

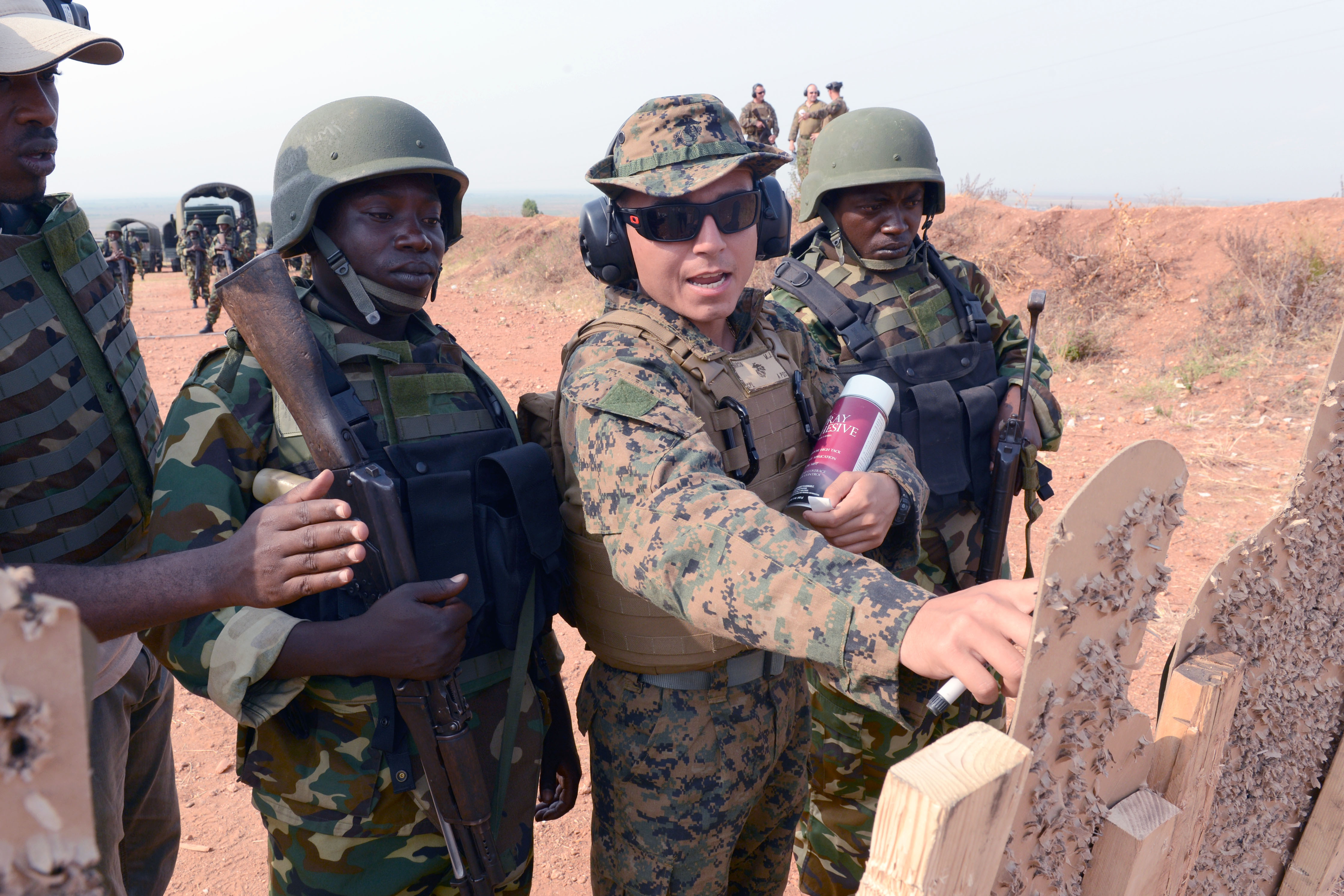
U.S. Marine Corps Sgt. Martin Garcia, a combat engineer with Special-Purpose Marine Air-Ground Task Force Africa 13, checks targets with Burundian soldiers in Mudubugu, Burundi, Aug. 22, 2013. The Marines and sailors are conducting a 10-week exercise with Burundi National Defense Force soldiers to prepare them for assignments in Somalia. Besides marksmanship, service members from both nations also shared best practices on medical care, infantry, basic weapons training, marksmanship, unexploded ordnance recognition, land navigation and patrolling. Nearly 300 SP-MAGTF members are currently in East Africa to support U.S. Africa Command and Combined Joint Task Force-Horn of Africa's missions to strengthen partner nation militaries. (U.S. Navy photo by Petty Officer 1st Class Tom Ouellette/Released)

The army's forces in 2011 included, according to IISS estimates, 2 light armoured battalions (squadrons), seven infantry battalions and independent companies; and artillery, engineer, and air defence battalions (SA-7 'Grail' man-portable SAMs and 14.5mm, 23mm and 37mm guns were reported). Separately reported were the 22nd commando battalion (Gitega) and 124th commando battalion (Bujumbura). Despite the elapse of another six years, the 2017 listing from the Military Balance was essentially unchanged except for an increase in size to some 30,000 and the addition of ten reserve infantry battalions.

In the wake of the 2015–2018 unrest, personnel faced a choice between supporting President Pierre Nkurunziza, with whom some fought when he was a military commander, or opposing him. Interviewed by Reuters on May 14, 2015, an Africa analyst at Verisk Maplecroft said a coup then reported in progress by Major General Godefroid Niyombare, former director of the intelligence service, "starkly highlight[ed] Nkurunziza's lack of unified support among his military chiefs." "Even if Niyombare's attempt fails, Nkurunziza's political credibility may be damaged irreparably."

The 121e Régiment de Parachutistes were mentioned in French news articles as one of the units that supported the attempted coup in 2015.

In the aftermath of the coup and the later disputed election, armed forces chief of staff Major General Prime Niyongabo survived an assassination attempt on September 11, 2015.

In 2015/16, Laurent Touchard wrote that the BNDF included ten two-battalion infantry brigades. (Touchard 2016)

== Structure ==
=== Branches ===
==== Army ====
In 2011 the IISS estimated that three Burundian battalions were deployed in Somalia. The army's forces in 2011 included, according to IISS estimates, 2 light armoured battalions (squadrons), seven infantry battalions and independent companies; and artillery, engineer, and air defence battalions (SA-7 'Grail' man-portable SAMs and 14.5mm, 23mm and 37mm guns were reported).

Separately reported were the 22nd commando battalion (Gitega) and 124th commando battalion (Bujumbura).

Despite the elapse of another six years, the 2017 listing from the Military Balance was essentially unchanged except for an increase in size to some 30,000 and the addition of ten reserve infantry battalions.

As of 2024 the Burundian ground forces consist of two armored battalions, seven infantry battalions, one artillery battalion, one air defense battalion, and one engineer battalion.

==== Air Force ====
Current roundel of Burundi

The Air Force includes several attack and utility helicopters as well as some training aircraft.

==== Navy ====
The navy includes several patrol boats. It operates across the different lakes of Burundi but with its main operations taking place in Lake Tanganyika.

==== Specialized units ====
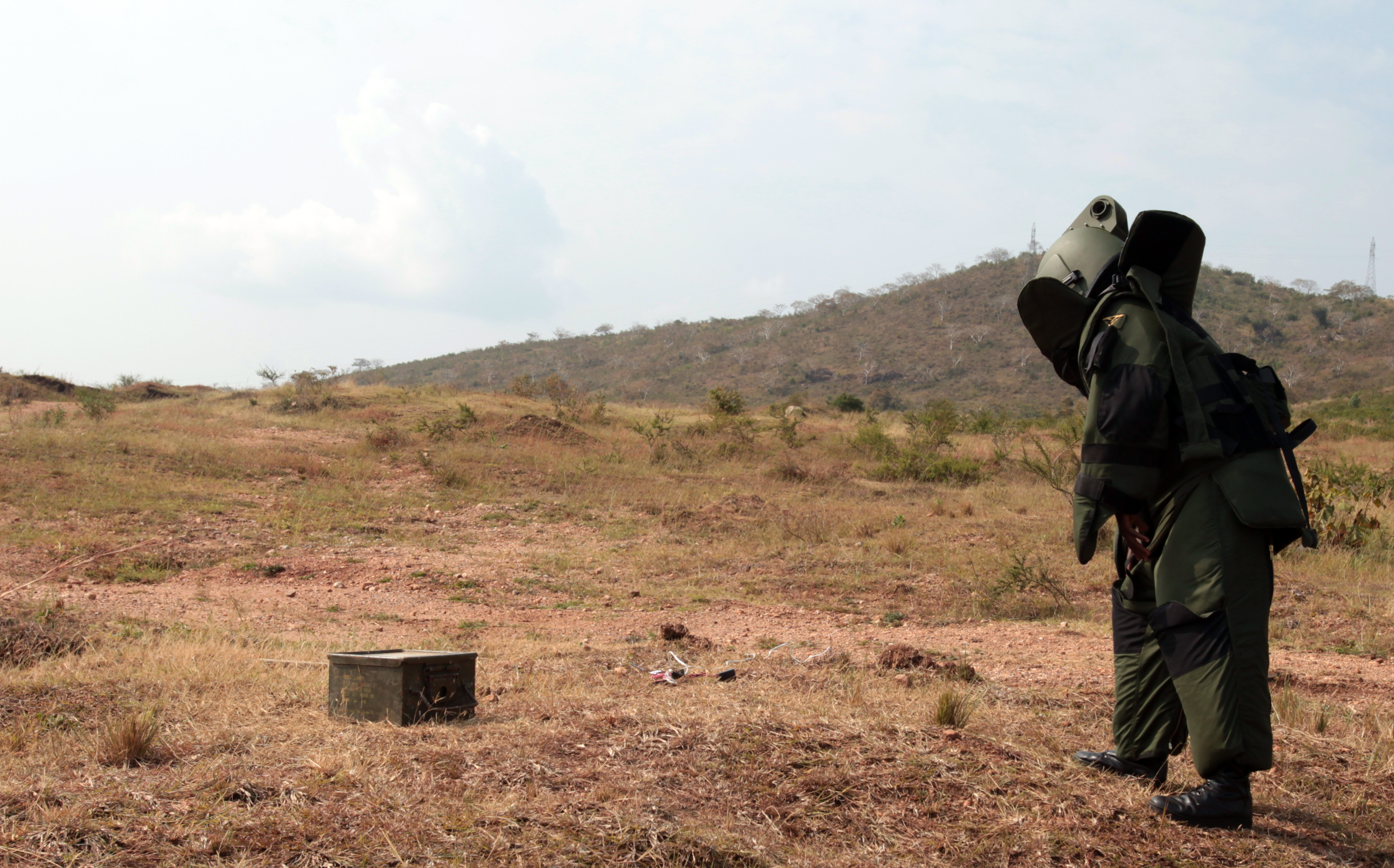
An explosive ordinance disposal soldier with 1st Sapper Company, Burundi National Defense Force, approaches a simulated improvised explosive device during a combined arms breaching exercise, June 26, 2012. Marines and sailors from Special-Purpose Marine Air-Ground Task Force Africa, Security Cooperation Team-2 have been in Burundi training with the 1st Sapper Company in combined arms breaching techniques to prepare the unit for deployment in support of the African Union Mission in Somalia. (Photo by Lance Cpl. Adwin Esters/120626-M-JL916-418)

The specialized units are:

- Special Brigade for the Protection of Institutions (BSPI)
- Military Police (PM)
- Headquarters (QG)

== United Nations missions & African Union Missions ==
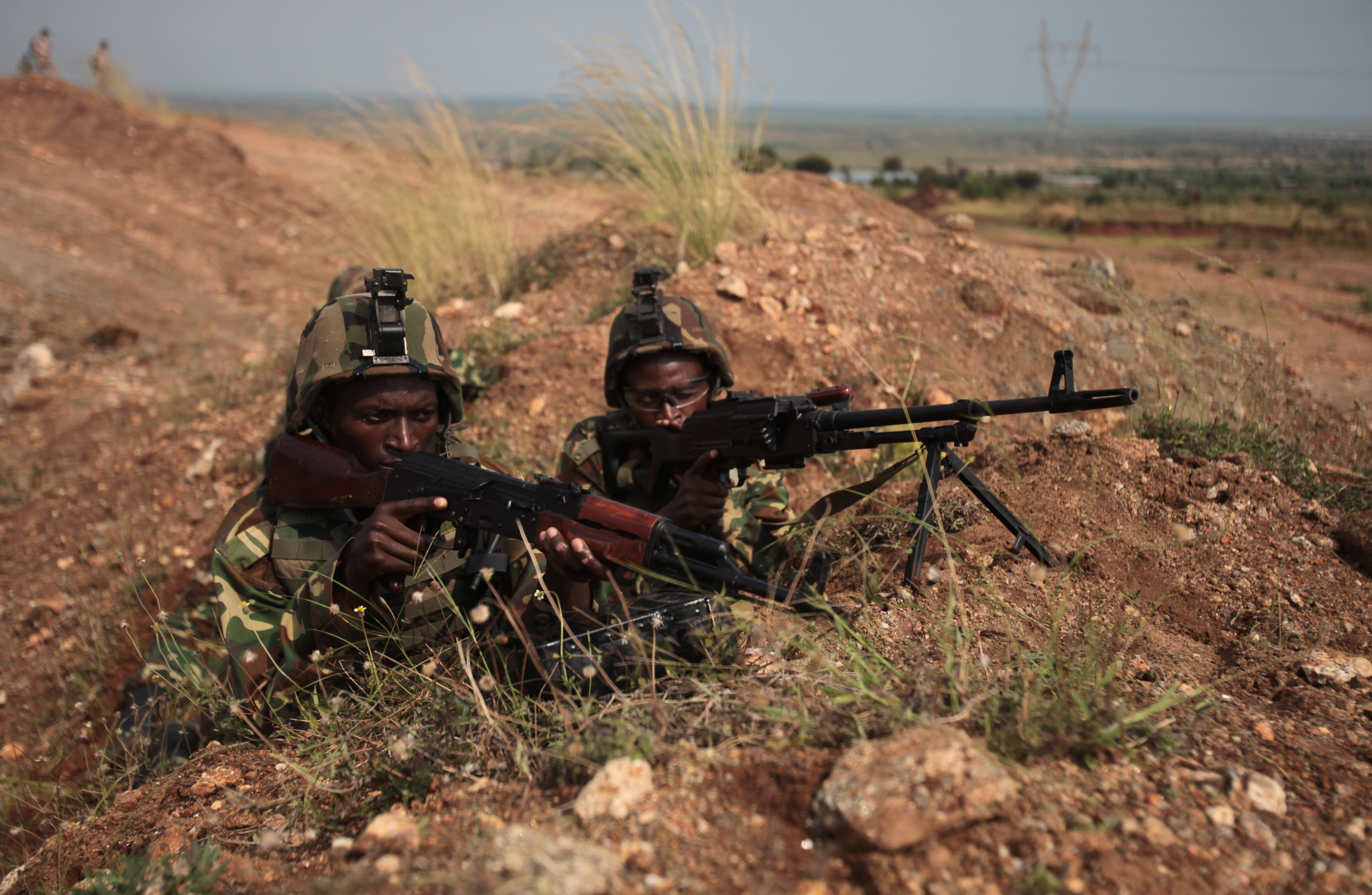
FDNB soldiers training before deployment to Somalia, 2012

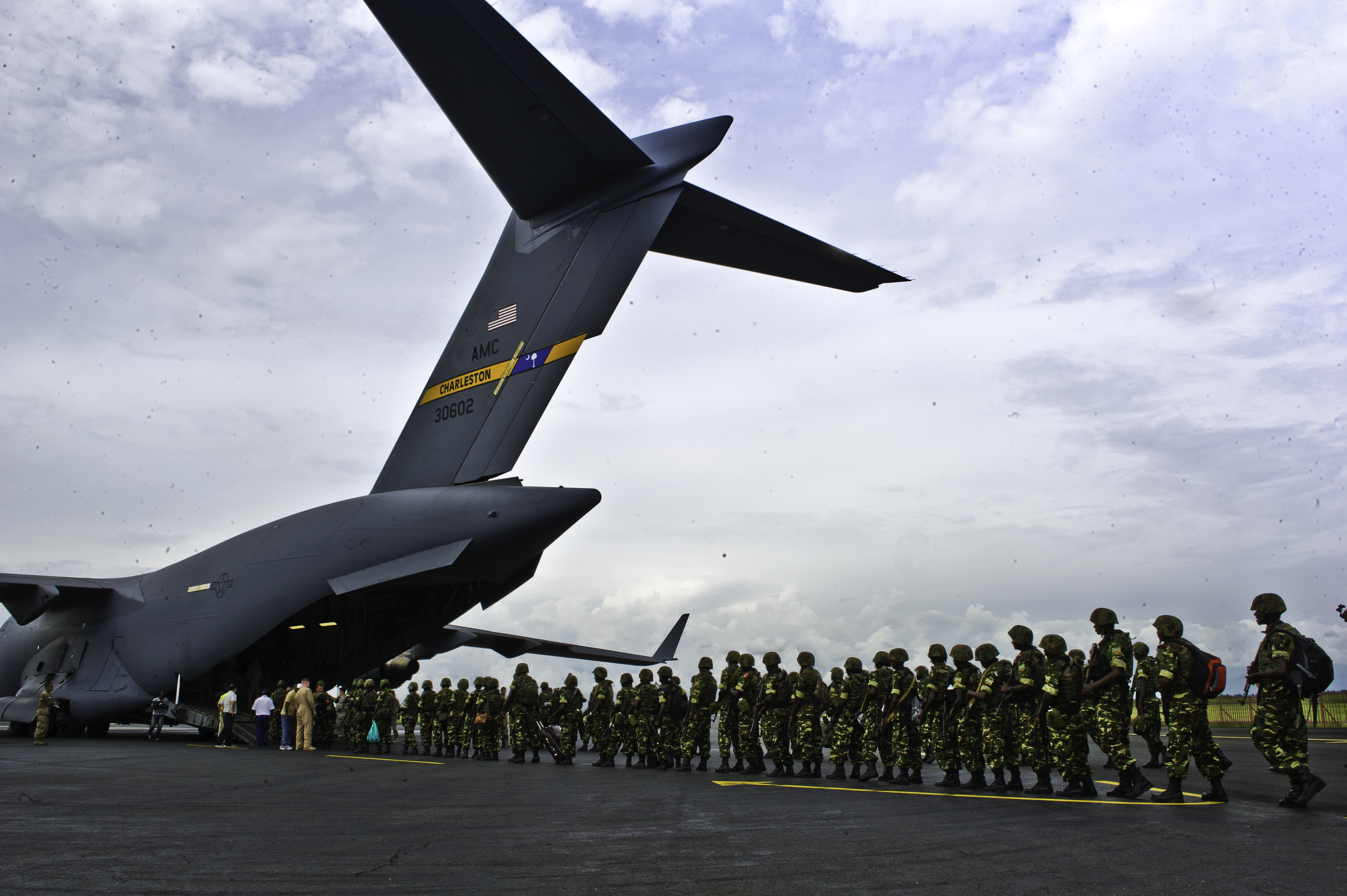
Burundi soldiers prepare to load onto a C-17 Globemaster Dec. 13, 2013 at Bujumbura Airport, Burundi. In coordination with the French military and African Union, the U.S. military provided airlift support to transport Burundi soldiers, food and supplies in the Central African Republic (CAR). This support is aimed at enabling African forces to deploy promptly to prevent further spread of sectarian violence and restore security in CAR. (U.S. Air Force photo by Staff Sgt. Erik Cardenas).

The FDNB has been involved in the following United Nations peacekeeping missions:

Mission	Location	Status	Numbers
United Nations
United Nations African Union Mission in Darfur (UNAMID)	Darfur, Sudan	Ended	2
United Nations Multidimensional Integrated Stabilization Mission in the Central African Republic (MINUSCA)	Bangui, Central African Republic	Ongoing	766
African Union
African Union Mission to Somalia (AMISOM)	Mogadishu, Somalia	Ended (Replaced by ATMIS)	5,432

== Equipment ==
=== Small arms ===
Name	Image	Caliber	Type	Origin	Notes
Machine guns and assault rifles
DShK		12.7×108mm	Heavy machine gun	Soviet Union	In service
RPK		7.62×39mm	Squad automatic weapon	Soviet Union	In service
PKM		7.62×54mm	General Purpose Machine Gun	Soviet Union	In service
AK-47		7.62×39mm	Assault rifle	Soviet Union	In service
PM md. 63		7.62×39mm	Assault rifle	Socialist Republic of Romania	Standard rifle
Vektor R4		5.56x45mm	Assault rifle	South Africa	In service
Heckler & Koch G3		7.62x51mm	Assault rifle	Germany	In service
Sniper rifles
SVD		7.62×54mmR	Sniper rifle	USSR/Russia	In service

=== Anti-tank weapons ===
Name	Image	Type	Origin	Caliber	Notes
RPG-7		Rocket-propelled grenade	Soviet Union	40mm	In service
M20 Super bazooka		Rocket-propelled grenade	United States	60mm	In service
RL-83 Blindicide		Anti-tank rocket launcher	Belgium	83mm	In service
Type 52		Recoilless rifle	United States; China	75mm	In service
MILAN		Anti-tank missile	France; West Germany	103mm (MILAN 1); 115mm (other variants)	In service

=== Scout cars ===
Name	Image	Type	Origin	Quantity	Notes
BRDM-2		Amphibious armored scout car	Soviet Union	30	In service

=== Armored personnel carriers ===
Name	Image	Type	Origin	Quantity	Notes
BTR-40		Armored personnel carrier	Soviet Union	29	In service
BTR-80		Armored personnel carrier	Soviet Union	10	In service
Walid		Armored personnel carrier	Egypt	6	In service
WZ-551		Armored personnel carrier	China	15	In service
Panhard M3		Armored personnel carrier	France	9	In service
Fahd 300		Armored personnel carrier	Egypt	19	In service

=== Reconnaissance ===
Name	Image	Type	Origin	Quantity	Notes
Panhard AML		Armored car	France	18	In service: 12 AML-90; 06 AML-60
Shorland S52		Armored car	United Kingdom	7	In service
ACMAT VLRA		Armored car	France		In service (Ceremonial presidential command car)

=== Mine-Resistant Ambush Protected ===
Name	Image	Type	Origin	Quantity	Notes
RG-31 Nyala		MRAP	South Africa / United Kingdom United States	12	In service
RG-33L		MRAP	South Africa	10	In service
Casspir		MRAP	South Africa /West Germany	27	In service
Cougar		MRAP	United States	16	In service
DCD HD Springbuck		MRAP	South Africa	10	In service

=== Artillery ===
Name	Image	Type	Origin	Quantity	Status
Mortars
BM-37		Mortar	Soviet Union	15	In service
MO-120-RT61		Mortar	France	75	In service
Rocket artillery
BM-21 Grad		Multiple rocket launcher	Soviet Union	12	In service
Field artillery
D-30		Howitzer	Soviet Union	18	In service

=== Air defence systems ===
Name	Image	Type	Origin	Quantity	Status
Type 55		Anti-aircraft gun	Soviet Union; China	135+	In service
ZU-23-2		Autocannon	Soviet Union	135+	In service
ZPU-4		SPAAG	Soviet Union	15	In service
9K32 Strela-2		MANPADS	Soviet Union	Unknown	In service

=== Aircraft inventory ===
Image	Aircraft	Type	Versions	Origin	In service	Notes
Utility helicopters
	Aérospatiale Alouette III	Utility helicopter	SA 316	France	3	
	Aérospatiale Écureuil	Utility helicopter	SA 350B	France		
	Aérospatiale SA 342 Gazelle	Utility helicopter	SA 342L	France	6	
	Airbus Helicopters H125M Fennec	Utility helicopter		Europe		
Attack helicopters
	Mil Mi-24 Hind	Attack helicopter	Mi-35	Soviet Union/Russia	3	
	Mil Mi-8 Hip	Attack helicopter	Mi-8	Soviet Union/Russia	1	
Training aircraft
	Cessna-Reims FRA150L	Training aircraft	FRA150L	United States		
	Aermacchi SF-260	Training aircraft	SF-260WL SF-260TP SF-260C	Italy		
Light attack aircraft
	Aermacchi SF-260	Light attack aircraft	SF-260WL SF-260TP SF-260C	Italy		

== Sources ==
- Daley, Patricia O. (2008). Gender & Genocide in Burundi : The Search for Spaces of Peace in the Great Lakes Region. African Issues. Bloomington: Indiana University Press. ISBN 978-0-253-35171-5.
- International Institute for Strategic Studies (IISS) (2012). "The Military Balance 2012". The Military Balance: Annual Estimates of the Nature and Size of the Military Forces of the Principal Powers. London: IISS. ISSN 0459-7222.
- IISS (2024). The Military Balance 2024. London: Routledge. ISBN 978-1-032-78004-7.
- Burundi Defence Review Lessons Learned
- Lansford, Tom, ed. (2017). Political Handbook of the World 2016-2017. Volume 1. Thousand Oaks, California: SAGE Publishing. ISBN 978-1-5063-2718-1.
- Weinstein, Warren (1976). Historical Dictionary of Burundi. Metuchen: Scarecrow Press. ISBN 9780810809628.
