= History of Burundi =

Burundi originated in the 16th century as a small kingdom in the African Great Lakes region. After European contact, it was united with the Kingdom of Rwanda, becoming the colony of Ruanda-Urundi - first colonised by Germany and then by Belgium. The colony gained independence in 1962, and split once again into Rwanda and Burundi. It is one of the few countries in Africa (along with Rwanda, Botswana, Lesotho, and Eswatini) to be a direct territorial continuation of a pre-colonial era African state.

== Kingdom of Burundi (1680–1966) ==
The origins of Burundi are known from a mix of oral history and archaeology. There are two main founding legends for Burundi. Both suggest that the nation was founded by a man named Cambarantama. The other version, more common in pre-colonial Burundi says that Cambarantama came from the southern state of Buha.

The first evidence of the Burundian state is from 16th century where it emerged on the eastern foothills. Over the following centuries it expanded, annexing smaller neighbours and competing with Rwanda. Its greatest growth occurred under Ntare IV Rutaganzwa Rugamba, who ruled the country from about 1796 to 1850 and saw the kingdom double in size.

The Kingdom of Burundi was characterized by a hierarchical political authority and tributary economic exchange. The king, known as the mwami headed a princely aristocracy (ganwa) which owned most of the land and required a tribute, or tax, from local farmers and herders. In the mid-18th century, this Tutsi royalty consolidated authority over land, production, and distribution with the development of the ubugabire—a patron-client relationship in which the populace received royal protection in exchange for tribute and land tenure.

=== European contact (1856) ===
European explorers and missionaries made brief visits to the area as early as 1856, and they compared the organization of the kingdom of Burundi with that of the old Greek empire. It was not until 1899 that Burundi became a part of German East Africa. Unlike the Rwandan monarchy, which decided to accept the German advances, the Burundian king Mwezi IV Gisabo opposed all European influence, refusing to wear European clothing and resisting the advance of European missionaries or administrators.

=== German East Africa (1899–1916) ===
The Germans used armed force and succeeded in doing great damage, but did not destroy the king's power. Eventually they backed one of the king's sons-in-law Maconco in a revolt against Gisabo. Gisabo was eventually forced to concede and agreed to German suzerainty. The Germans then helped him suppress Maconco's revolt. The smaller kingdoms along the western shore of Lake Victoria were also attached to Burundi.

Even after this the foreign presence was minimal and the kings continued to rule much as before. The Europeans did, however, bring devastating diseases affecting both people and animals. Affecting the entire region, Burundi was especially hard hit. A great famine hit in 1905, with others striking the entire Great Lakes region in 1914, 1923 and 1944. Between 1905 and 1914 half the population of the western plains region died.

=== Belgian and United Nations governance (1916–1962) ===
In 1916 Belgian troops conquered the area during the First World War. In 1923, the League of Nations mandated to Belgium the territory of Ruanda-Urundi, encompassing modern-day Rwanda and Burundi, the western kingdoms being assigned to Tanganyika. The Belgians administered the territory through indirect rule, building on the Tutsi-dominated aristocratic hierarchy.

Following the Second World War, Ruanda-Urundi became a United Nations Trust Territory under Belgian administrative authority. The trust territory guidelines required that the trust territories be prepared for independence and majority rule but it wasn't until 10 November 1959 that Belgium committed itself to political reform and legalised the emergence of competing political parties.

On 20 January 1959, Burundi's ruler Mwami Mwambutsa IV requested Burundi's independence from Belgium and dissolution of the Ruanda-Urundi union. In the following months, Burundian political parties began to advocate for the end of Belgian colonial rule and the separation of Rwanda and Burundi. The first and largest of these political parties was the Union for National Progress (UPRONA). UPRONA was a multi-ethnic party led by Tutsi Prince Louis Rwagasore while the Christian Democratic Party (PDC) was supported by Belgium, which was being ruled by the Christian Social Party, whose party leader, August de Schryver, was Minister of the Belgian Congo and Ruanda-Urundi from 1959 until 1960.

Burundi's first elections took place on 8 September 1961 and UPRONA won just over 80% of the electorate's votes. In the wake of the elections, on 13 October, the 29-year-old Prince Rwagasore was assassinated, robbing Burundi of its most popular and well-known nationalist. Historians have speculated over Belgium's role in Rwagasore's death and the two highest ranking Belgian colonial officials in Burundi (Jean-Paul Harroy and Roberto Régnier) were accused of involvement by Rwagasore's convicted murderer (Jean Kageorgis). The day after Kageorgis' execution Burundi was granted independence.

Ethnic Distribution of Leadership Positions
Ethnic group	1929	1933	1937	1945	1967	1987	1993	1997	2000a	2000b	End-2001
Tutsi	22	15	18	28	71	72%	32%	38%	89%	100%	47%
Hutu	20	6	2	0	18	28%	68%	62%	11%	0%	53%

== Independence (1962) ==
The flag of the Kingdom of Burundi (1962–1966).

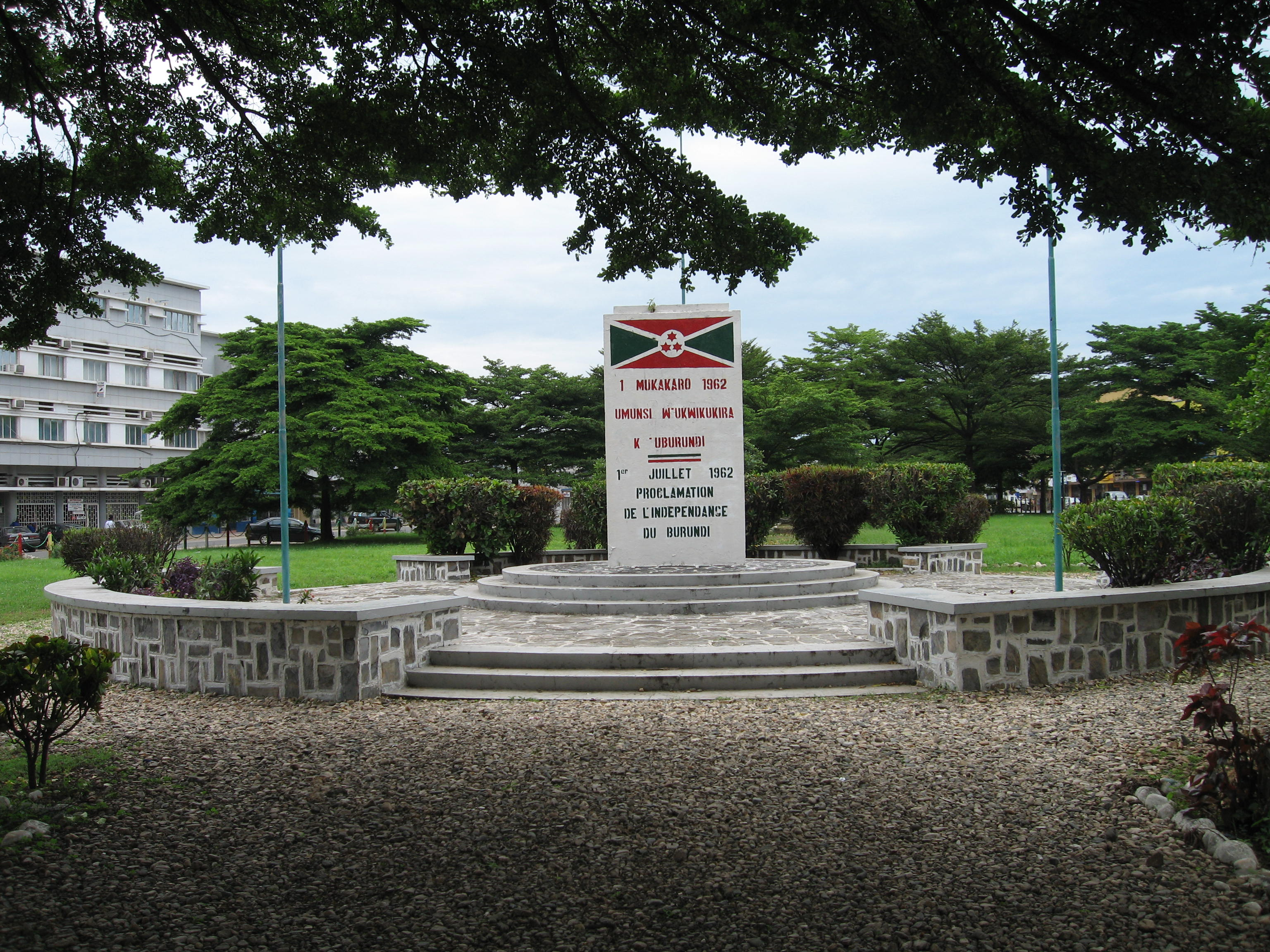
Independence Square and monument in Bujumbura.

Full independence was achieved on July 1, 1962. In the context of weak democratic institutions at independence, Tutsi King Mwambutsa IV Bangiriceng established a constitutional monarchy comprising equal numbers of Hutus and Tutsis. The 15 January 1965 assassination of the Hutu prime minister Pierre Ngendandumwe set in motion a series of destabilizing Hutu revolts and subsequent governmental repression.

These were in part in reaction to Rwanda's "Social Revolution" of 1959–1961, where Rwandan Tutsi were subject to mass murder by the new government of Hutu Grégoire Kayibanda. In Burundi the Tutsi became committed to ensuring they would not meet the same fate and much of the country's military and police forces became controlled by Tutsis. Unlike Rwanda, which allied itself with the United States in the Cold War, Burundi after independence became affiliated with China.

The monarchy refused to recognize gains by Hutu candidates in the first legislative elections held by Burundi as an independent country on 10 May 1965. In response, a group of Hutu carried out a failed coup attempt against the monarchy on 18 October 1965, which in turn prompted the killing of scores of Hutu politicians and intellectuals. On 9 July 1966, King Mwambutsa IV was deposed by his son, Prince Ntare V, who himself was deposed by his prime minister Capt. Michel Micombero on 28 November 1966. Micombero abolished the monarchy and declared a republic. A de facto military regime emerged and civil unrest continued throughout the late 1960s and early 1970s. Micombero headed a clique of ruling Hima, the Tutsi subgroup located in southern Burundi. Similar to 1965, rumors of an impending Hutu coup in 1969 prompted the arrest and execution of scores of prominent political and military figures.

In June 1971, a group of Banyaruguru, the socially "higher up" subgroup of Tutsi located in the north of the country, were accused of conspiracy by the ruling Hima clique. On 14 January 1972, a military tribunal sentenced four Banyaruguru officers and five civilians to death, and seven to life imprisonment. To the Hima concerns about a Hutu uprising or Banyaruguru-led coup was added the return of Ntare V from exile, a potential rallying point for the Hutu majority.

=== 1972 genocide ===
On April 29, there was an outbreak of violence in the south of the country, also the base of the Hima, where bands of roving Hutu committed atrocities against Tutsi civilians. All civilian and military authorities in the city of Bururi were killed and the insurgents then seized the armories in the towns of Rumonge and Nyanza-Lac. They then attempted to kill every Tutsi they could, as well as some Hutu who refused to participate in the rebellion, before retreating to Vyanda, near Bururi, and proclaiming a "Republic of Martyazo." Somewhere from 800 to 1200 people were killed.

A week after the insurgent proclamation of a republic, government troops moved in. Meanwhile, President Micombero declared martial law on May 30 and asked Zairean President Mobutu Sese Seko for assistance. Congolese paratroopers were deployed to secure the airport while the Burundi army moved into the countryside. Africanist René Lemarchand notes, "What followed was not so much a repression as a hideous slaughter of Hutu civilians. The carnage went on unabated through the month of August. By then virtually every educated Hutu element, down to secondary school students, was either dead or in flight."

Because the perpetrators, composed of government troops and the Jeunesses Révolutionnaires Rwagasore (JRR), the youth wing of the Union for National Progress ruling party, targeted primarily civil servants, educated males and university students, solely because of their "Hutuness" and irrespective of whether they posed a threat, Lemarchand terms the eradication a "partial genocide." One of the first to be killed was deposed monarch Ntare V, in Gitega.

As president, Micombero became an advocate of African socialism and received support from the People's Republic of China. He imposed a staunch regime of law and order, sharply repressing Hutu militarism.

From late April to September 1972, an estimated 200,000 to 300,000 Hutu were killed. About 300,000 people became refugees, with most fleeing to Tanzania. In an effort to attract sympathy from the United States, the Tutsi-dominated government accused the Hutu rebels of having Communist leanings, although there is no credible evidence that this was actually the case. Lemarchand notes that, while crushing the rebellion was the first priority, the genocide was successful in a number of other objectives: ensuring the long-term stability of the Tutsi state by eliminating Hutu elites and potential elites; turning the army, police and gendarmerie into a Tutsi monopoly; denying the potential return of monarchy through the murder of Ntare V; and creating a new legitimacy for the Hima-dominated state as protector of the country, especially for the previously fractious Tutsi-Banyaruguru.

=== Post-1972 genocide developments ===
In 1976, Colonel Jean-Baptiste Bagaza took power in a bloodless coup. Although Bagaza led a Tutsi-dominated military regime, he encouraged land reform, electoral reform, and national reconciliation. In 1981, a new constitution was promulgated. In 1984, Bagaza was elected head of state, as the sole candidate. After his election, Bagaza's human rights record deteriorated as he suppressed religious activities and detained political opposition members.

In 1987, Major Pierre Buyoya overthrew Col. Bagaza in a military coup d'état. He dissolved opposition parties, suspended the 1981 constitution, and instituted his ruling Military Committee for National Salvation (CSMN). During 1988, increasing tensions between the ruling Tutsis and the majority Hutus resulted in violent confrontations between the army, the Hutu opposition, and Tutsi hardliners. During this period, an estimated 150,000 people were killed, with tens of thousands of refugees fleeing to neighboring countries. Buyoya formed a commission to investigate the causes of the 1988 unrest and to develop a charter for democratic reform.

In 1991, Buyoya approved a constitution that provided for a president, non-ethnic government, and a parliament. Burundi's first Hutu president, Melchior Ndadaye, of the Hutu-dominated Front for Democracy in Burundi (FRODEBU) Party, was elected in 1993.

== 1993 genocide and civil war (1993–2005) ==
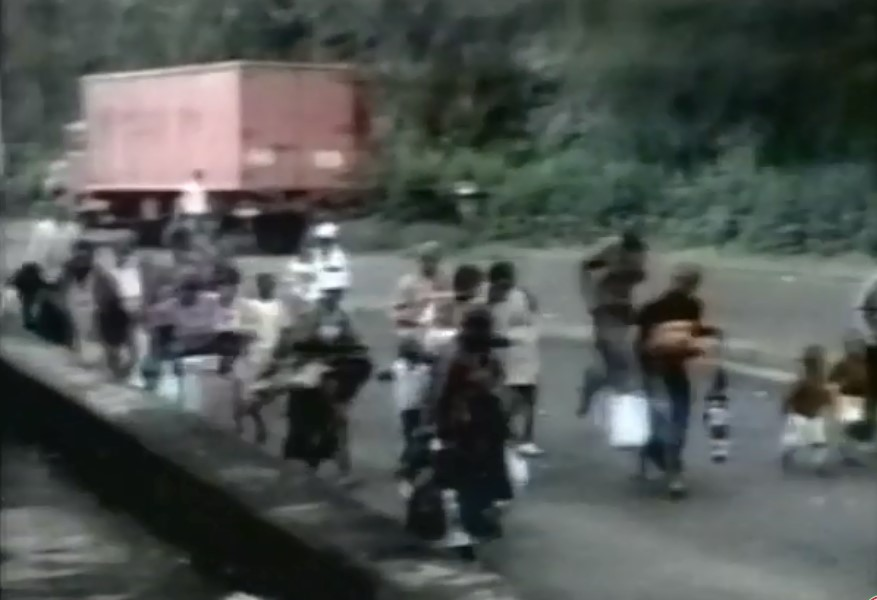
People fleeing during 1993 Burundian genocide

Ndadaye was assassinated three months later, in October 1993, by Tutsi army extremists. The country's situation rapidly declined as Hutu peasants began to rise up and massacre Tutsi. In acts of brutal retribution, the Tutsi army proceeded to round up thousands of Hutu and kill them. The Rwandan genocide in 1994, sparked by the killing of Ndadaye's successor Cyprien Ntaryamira, further aggravated the conflict in Burundi by sparking additional massacres of Tutsis.

A decade of civil war followed, as the Hutu formed militias in the refugee camps of northern Tanzania. An estimated 300,000 people were killed in clashes and reprisals against the local population, with 550,000 citizens (nine percent of the population) being displaced. After the assassination of Ntaryamira, the Hutu presidency and Tutsi military operated under a power-sharing political system until July 1996, when Tutsi Pierre Buyoya seized power in a military coup. Under international pressure, the warring factions negotiated a peace agreement in Arusha in 2000, which called for ethnically balanced military and government and democratic elections.

The country has been hit hard by HIV/AIDS during this period. Sample testing by SOS Children had shown that those who were HIV positive were 20 percent of the urban population and 6% of the rural population. The death toll due to the syndrome has been devastating: the UN estimated 12,000 deaths in 2001 and Oxfam estimated 40,000 deaths in 2001.

Two powerful Hutu rebel groups (the CNDD-FDD and the FNL) refused to sign the peace agreement and fighting continued in the countryside. Finally, the CNDD-FDD agreed to sign a peace deal in November 2003 and joined the transitional government. The last remaining rebel group, the FNL, continued to reject the peace process and committed sporadic acts of violence in 2003 and 2004, finally signing a cease fire agreement in 2006.

== Post-war (2005–present) ==
=== Post-war elections ===
In 2005, Burundi began the transition towards peace with its first elections since 1993. The CNDD-FDD won both the local and legislative elections, held in June and July respectively. An indirect presidential election took place in August 2005, and the members of the legislature and senate elected Pierre Nkurunziza, a former teacher and CNDD rebel, who had been president of the CNDD-FDD party since August 2000. He won with 151 of the 161 votes.

=== Nkurunziza era (2005–2020) ===
Peacetime ushered in an era in which the ruling CNDD-FDD party dominated the political space in Burundi. President Pierre Nkurunziza, and a small clique of military generals from the party, tightly controlled the country.

In 2005, Pierre Nkurunziza, became the first post-transitional president. He was elected by the National Assembly and Senate through the means of indirect presidential elections.

Former President Domitien Ndayizeye and his political supporters were arrested in 2006 and accused of plotting a coup, but later he was acquitted by the Supreme Court. International human rights groups claimed that the current government was framing Domitien Ndayizeye by torturing him into false confessions of a coup plot. In December 2006 the International Crisis Group labeled Burundi's human rights status as "deteriorating". The organization reported that the government had arrested critics, muzzled the press, committed human rights abuses, and tightened its control over the economy, and that "unless it [reversed] this authoritarian course, it risk[ed] triggering violent unrest and losing the gains of peace process."

In February 2007, the United Nations officially shut down its peacekeeping operations in Burundi and turned its attention to rebuilding the nation's economy, which relies heavily on tea and coffee, but which had suffered severely during 12 years of civil war. The UN had deployed 5,600 peacekeepers since 2004, and several hundred troops remained to work with the African Union in monitoring the ceasefire. The UN Post Conflict Fund (PBF) pledged $35 million to Burundi to work on infrastructure, to promote democratic practices, to rebuild the military, and to defend human rights.

==== 2010 elections ====
Nkurunziza was re-elected in 2010 with more than 91% of the votes amidst an opposition boycott and sworn in for his second term on 26 August 2010.

==== 2015 unrest ====
In April 2015, Nkurunziza announced that he would seek a third term in office. The opposition said that Nkurunziza's bid to extend his term was in defiance of the constitution, as it bars the president from running for a third term. However, Nkurunziza's allies said his first term did not count as he was appointed by parliament and not directly by the people. On April 26 police clashed with demonstrators protesting Nkurunziza's announcement that he would seek a third term in office. At least six people were killed in the first two days of ongoing protests. The government shut down multiple radio stations and arrested a prominent civil society leader, Pierre-Claver Mbonimpa. UN Secretary-General Ban Ki-moon said, in a statement, that he had despatched his special envoy for the region, Said Djinnit, to Burundi for talks with Nkurunziza. African Union commission head Nkosazana Dlamini-Zuma said she welcomed a decision by Burundi's Senate to ask the Constitutional Court to rule whether Nkurunziza could stand for re-election. More than 24,000 people fled Burundi in April, as tensions mounted ahead of presidential elections in June, the UN refugee agency said.

On May 13, 2015, Burundi army General Godefroid Niyombareh, former head of Burundian intelligence, declared a coup via radio while Nkurunziza was abroad attending a summit in Tanzania with other African leaders. Niyombareh had been fired by the President in February. Despite reports that gunshots had been heard and people were celebrating in the streets of the capital, government officials dismissed the threat and claimed to remain in control.

Opposition groups announced on 26 June that they would boycott the election.

Speaking to a Kenyan television station on 6 July, one of the coup leaders, General Leonard Ngendakumana, called for armed rebellion against Nkurunziza. He said that his group was responsible for the grenade attacks and said that "our intent is to intensify". Fighting was reported in northern Burundi on 10–11 July. The military said on 13 July that 31 rebels had been killed and 170 had been captured in those battles; it said that six of its own soldiers had also been wounded. The Burundian government stated that the rebels had crossed into northern Burundi through the Nyungwe Forest from Rwanda but the Rwandan government denied this. Ngendakumana said that the rebels were from his group.

Shortly after the election was held on 21 July, without the participation of the opposition, main opposition leader Agathon Rwasa proposed the formation of a national unity government, while warning of the potential for more violence and armed rebellion against Nkurunziza. As conditions for participating in such a government, Rwasa said that Nkurunziza's third term would need to be greatly truncated to no more than a year and new elections would have to be held, although he admitted that he doubted Nkurunziza would accept those conditions. He also urged those hoping to oust Nkurunziza through violence to instead focus on dialogue. The government welcomed the idea of forming a national unity government, but rejected the notion of truncating Nkurunziza's new term.

The presidential election results were announced on 24 July 2015. Nkurunziza won the election with 69.41% of the vote. Agathon Rwasa was placed second and credited with 18.99% despite calling for a boycott. This change of power led to an opening of social science research in the country, and later a reconsideration of the value and purpose of that research within the context of the larger political and societal violence.

On 30 September 2016, the United Nations Human Rights Council established the Commission of Inquiry on Burundi through resolution 33/24. Its mandate is to "conduct a thorough investigation into human rights violations and abuses committed in Burundi since April 2015, to identify alleged perpetrators and to formulate recommendations." The Human Rights Council extended the mandate of the commission for another year in September 2017. On 29 September 2017 the Commission of Inquiry on Burundi called on Burundian government to put an end to serious human rights violations. It further stressed that, "The Burundian government has so far refused to cooperate with the Commission of Inquiry, despite the Commission's repeated requests and initiatives." The Commission conducted interviews with more than 500 Burundian refugees abroad and others who remained in their country and reached the conclusion that "serious human rights violations and abuses have been committed in Burundi since April 2015. The violations the Commission documented include arbitrary arrests and detentions, acts of torture and cruel, inhuman or degrading treatment, extrajudicial executions, enforced disappearances, rape and other forms of sexual violence."

==== Post-2015 ====
In a constitutional referendum in May 2018, Burundians voted by 79.08% to approve an amended constitution that ensured that Nkurunziza could remain in power until 2034. However, much to the surprise of most observers, Nkurunziza later announced that he did not intend to serve another term, paving the way for a new president to be elected in the 2020 General Election.

On 24 December 2018, the government moved Burundi's political capital from Bujumbura back to Gitega, where it had been until 1966.

The threat of the COVID-19 pandemic was played down officially by the regime. The Presidency issued a statement which warned its population against "hasty, extreme, unilateral measures" against the virus. Human Rights Watch reported that some nurses had been told "not to talk about suspected cases, symptom patterns, or insufficient resources".

=== Post-Nkurunziza (2020–present) ===
On 20 May 2020, Évariste Ndayishimiye, a candidate who was hand-picked as Nkurunziza's successor by the CNDD-FDD, won the election with 71.45% of the vote. Shortly after, on 9 June 2020, Nkurunziza died of a cardiac arrest, at the age of 55. There was some speculation that his death was COVID-19 related, though this is unconfirmed. As per the constitution, Pascal Nyabenda, the president of the national assembly, led the government until Ndayishimiye's inauguration on 18 June 2020.

Initially, Ndayishimiye adopted a stronger response to the COVID-19 pandemic than his predecessor - calling the virus the nation's "worst enemy" shortly after taking office. In January 2021, he closed national borders, having previously issued a statement which said that anyone bringing Covid into Burundi would be treated as "people bringing weapons to kill Burundians". In February 2021, however, Burundi joined Tanzania in being the only African nations to reject vaccines from the COVAX scheme: the health minister Thaddee Ndikumana stated that “since more than 95% of patients are recovering, we estimate that the vaccines are not yet necessary.” As of June 2021, Burundi has still not made any effort to procure vaccines - one of three countries to fail to take this step.

In June 2025, Burundi urged the United Nations to officially recognize the 1972-1973 massacres of Hutus as genocide.

== See also ==
- Burundi Civil War
- Colonial Heads of Burundi
- Heads of government of Burundi
- List of kings of Burundi
- List of presidents of Burundi
- Livingstone-Stanley Monument, Burundi
- Politics of Burundi
- Bujumbura history and timeline

General:

- History of Africa
