= 1976 Burundian coup d'état =

1976 coup d'état in Burundi

- Location of Burundi in Central Africa
- Date: 1 November 1976
- Location: Bujumbura, Burundi
- Type: Military coup
- Motive: Regime change
- Target: Presidential Palace, Bujumbura
- Organised by: Jean-Baptiste Bagaza
- Outcome: Coup succeeds: Michel Micombero is ousted by Deputy Chief of Staff Jean-Baptiste Bagaza; Formation of the Supreme Revolutionary Council; Bagaza is inaugurated as president

The 1976 Burundian coup d'état was a bloodless military coup that took place in Burundi on 1 November 1976. An Army faction, led by Deputy Chief of Staff Jean-Baptiste Bagaza, ousted President Michel Micombero. Bagaza formed the 30-member Supreme Revolutionary Council to take control, suspended the country's constitution and was inaugurated as president on 10 November 1976.

Micombero was initially arrested but later allowed to leave the country and went into exile in Somalia (then Somali Democratic Republic under the rule of Siad Barre) where he died in 1983.

== Aftermath ==
=== The regime of Bagaza ===
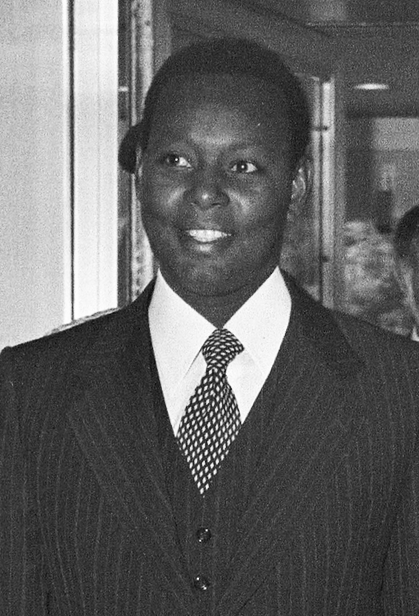
Jean-Baptiste Bagaza, who took power in the coup, pictured in 1978

After coming to power, Bagaza tried to defuse interethnic and intra-ethnic tensions between Hutu and Tutsi through a series of liberalization. In 1977, Bagaza returned Burundi to civilian rule and the Hutus were incorporated into the government; an anti-corruption campaign began and eventually a limited land reform program was launched by the government.

In November 1981, a new constitution was approved in a referendum, but Burundi remained a one-party state led by the Union for National Progress party (Union pour le Progrès national, UPRONA).

According to the Constitution, election was held on 22 October 1982 for the National Assembly, and on 31 August 1984 Bagaza was elected president with 99.6% of the vote, being the only candidate for the country's presidency. However, the reforms were cosmetic in nature, the state was still dominated by UPRONA and the military, which in general served as instruments of political and economic domination of the Hima-Tutsi clan, based in Bururi (Bagaza was from province of the same name), while most of the Hutus remained marginalized and disenfranchised.

To organize resistance against Tutsi rule, Hutu refugees in the neighboring Democratic Republic of the Congo (then Zaire under the rule of Mobutu Sese Seko) founded the Party for the Liberation of the Hutu People (Parti pour la libération du peuple Hutu, PALIPEHUTU) in April 1980. During this period, Tutsis had monopoly access to education and work in government bodies.

As the state centralized all decisions and dissemination of information, it came into conflict with the Catholic Church. The church provided alternative means of access to health care, education and social mobilization to those controlled by the Tutsis, which resulted in the church being accused of "supporting the Hutu resistance". This conflict culminated in the expulsion of missionaries and the nationalization of Catholic schools in 1985.

=== Crisis of the regime and overthrow of Bagaza ===
The failure of the authorities to carry out meaningful political, economic and social reforms and the persecution of the Catholic Church by the state led to an increase in dissent, which, from 1984, has been suppressed with increasingly violent manifestations through the arrest and torture of opponents of the government.

The early years of Bagaza's presidency were characterized by large public investments financed by foreign loans. Because these investments were made to create new sources of income and patronage for the Bururi-Tutsi elite, and not to achieve economic development goals, they did not have long-term viability. The authorities, in order to pay the external debt, imposed high taxes, which in turn hit the population hard.

The deteriorating human rights situation has led to conflict with Burundi's major foreign donors, especially Belgium and France, who have begun to pressure the government to implement meaningful reforms, withholding aid, which accounted for 50% of government spending.

By 1986, the country's economic situation had deteriorated so much that Bagaza was forced to accept a structural adjustment program imposed by the IMF and the World Bank, which included massive cuts in military and government spending.

Such measures proved disastrous for Bagaza, as the Tutsi elite and military did not approve of the loss of jobs, income and patronage, as a result of which he was overthrown on 3 September 1987 in a bloodless military coup, led by Major Pierre Buyoya.
