= Anti-clerical campaign of the government of Burundi =

Policy of repression of the Roman Catholic Church in Burundi

Anti-clerical campaign of the government of Burundi was a policy of repression and restriction of the rights of the Catholic Church, pursued in Burundi from 1977 to 1987 by the regime of President Jean-Baptiste Bagaza.

The repression against the Roman Catholic Church stemmed from the ethnic conflict that plagued Burundi since its independence. The military regime, representing the interests of the Tutsi minority, suspected the church of supporting the discriminated Hutu majority. Starting in 1977, President Bagaza's government consistently restricted the rights of the church, evidenced by measures such as: the liquidation of Catholic press and education, the expulsion of hundreds of foreign missionaries, limitations on religious freedom, and the arrest of clergy and lay Catholic activists. Normalization of relations between the state and the church occurred only after Bagaza was overthrown in the 1987 coup d'état.

== Social and historical background ==
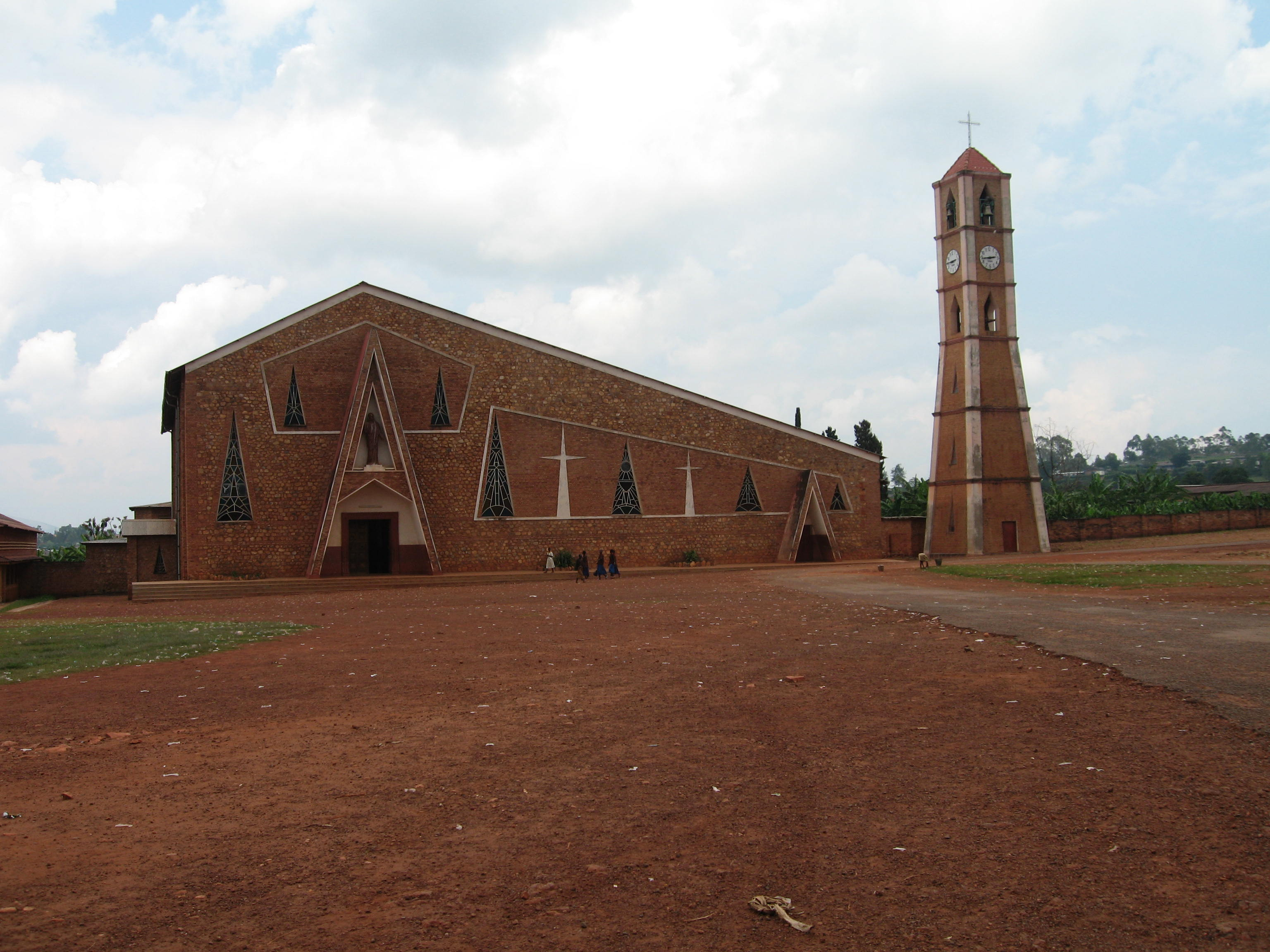
Cathedral in Gitega

The beginnings of Christianity in the lands of present-day Burundi can be traced back to 1879, when White Fathers missionaries established their first mission in Rumonge on the shores of Lake Tanganyika. Due to the hostile attitude of the local population, it lasted only two years. It was not until the turn of the 19th and 20th centuries that more intensive Christianization efforts began in the region. European missionaries were aided by the fact that Islam, nor any other Abrahamic or Indian religion, had taken root in Burundi. The local population also did not practice traditions that were particularly difficult to reconcile with the principles of the Christian faith (polygamy, elaborate ancestor worship, etc.). As a result, by the 1970s, nearly 70% of Burundi's population adhered to Christianity, with the Roman Catholic Church being by far the largest and most influential denomination. The number of Catholics baptized in the Roman rite accounted for 60% to 65% of the population of Burundi, while 5% to 10% of the population belonged to various Protestant churches and communities. The clergy were predominantly European.

Burundi, like its neighboring country Rwanda, gained independence on 1 July 1962. The escalating antagonism between the Tutsi minority, traditionally holding higher social status, and the numerically dominant Hutu had a profound impact on the fate of both countries. (Note: Following Belgian estimates from the 1930s, most sources typically state that Burundi's population consists of 85% Hutu, 14% Tutsi, and 1% Twa (Lemarchand (1996, p. 6); Skutsch (1999, p. 340)).) In Rwanda, rising ethnic tensions led to the outbreak of a bloody uprising (1959–1962), which resulted in the overthrow of the Tutsi monarchy and the establishment of a republic dominated entirely by Hutu. On the other hand, Burundi, where the social hierarchy and ethnic divisions were much less rigid and significantly more complicated, began its independent life as a constitutional monarchy, with the Tutsi maintaining significant influence. However, under the influence of various factors, relations between the two ethnic groups quickly deteriorated.

An attempted coup by a group of Hutu officers in October 1965 enabled the Tutsi-controlled army to gain dominant influence over the country's affairs. After a few months of difficult cohabitation, the military overthrew the monarchy in a coup d'état and declared the establishment of the so-called First Republic on 28 November 1966. The country was led by the former prime minister and defense minister, Captain Michel Micombero (Tutsi-Hima).

In the following years, the military regime systematically reduced the influence of the Hutu in political life, the armed forces, and the administration. In April 1972, radical Hutu politicians, with the help of mercenaries from Zaire, initiated an armed uprising in the southern provinces of the country, during which hundreds to thousands of Tutsi were murdered. The rebellion was quickly suppressed by the government army, and the reprisals against its supporters turned into a planned and systematic extermination of the Hutu social elite. From the end of April to September 1972, between 100,000 and 300,000 Hutu were killed in Burundi, and at least 150,000 were forced to flee the country. This was the first documented case of genocide in post-colonial Africa. The massacres of 1972 ultimately solidified the status of the Tutsi as the dominant ethnic group. For the next 16 years, power, influence, privileges, and wealth were reserved exclusively for members of this group, while the Hutu were blocked from access to education and excluded from military service or employment in state administration.

== Birth of the Second Republic ==
On 1 November 1976, President Micombero was overthrown in a military coup. Power in the country was taken by the Supreme Military Council, headed by Lieutenant Colonel Jean-Baptiste Bagaza. The bloodless coup initially seemed like a classic palace coup, as the new president was Micombero's cousin, also from the Tutsi-Hima subgroup. However, it quickly became clear that the new regime aimed to radically overhaul the state and society, symbolized by the adoption of a new constitution in November 1981. The period of Bagaza's rule (1976–1987) is now known in the history of Burundi as the era of the "Second Republic".

The fall of the discredited regime of Micombero, tainted by genocide, was welcomed with relief both within Burundi and beyond its borders. The coup was also favorably received by the Roman Catholic Church, whose bishops, in a pastoral letter from December 1976, wished the new government "every success" and assured it of their "full support for its efforts". The brief hopes raised by the birth of the Second Republic were linked to the fact that, in the early stages of his rule, Bagaza took several actions that appeared to aim at easing the ethnic tensions that had torn the country apart. The regime's central slogan became "national unity". Government propaganda proclaimed that the division of society into Tutsi and Hutu was an artificial problem created by colonial governments. Consequently, identity documents were stripped of any reference to ethnic origins, and all previous restrictions on marriage between Hutu and Tutsi were abolished. Public and private references to ethnic origin were soon prohibited, with violations potentially being considered as incitement to racial hatred. Bagaza also declared an amnesty for all Hutu exiles and released a number of political prisoners. He made conciliatory gestures towards other Tutsi clans, previously discriminated against by the Tutsi-Hima rulers. The credibility of the president's actions was further strengthened by the fact that he had not been involved in the 1972 genocide, being abroad at the time. Furthermore, the government vigorously promoted a return to pre-colonial traditions and values, with the elevation of the Kirundi language to the status of the sole language of instruction in primary and secondary schools serving as a particularly symbolic gesture. A number of investments in infrastructure and education were also undertaken.

However, the Second Republic was a strictly authoritarian state, plagued by corruption and nepotism. The 1981 constitution confirmed the status of the ruling party, UPRONA, as the only legally operating political force. During Bagaza's rule, Tutsi dominance in political and social life was firmly entrenched. (Note: In the 30-member Supreme Military Council, all seats were occupied by officers from the Tutsi ethnic group. All provincial governors also came from this ethnic group. Between 1976 and 1979, only three Hutu were included in the cabinet, holding relatively insignificant positions such as ministers for public services, labor and social affairs, and transport and aviation. In 1982, Hutu held only 15 seats in the 65-member parliament, and by 1987, this group had decreased to just seven members. Moreover, Tutsi completely dominated the structures of the ruling party, UPRONA – both at the central and regional levels (for example, in the 65-member central committee, there were only two Hutu) (Lemarchand (1996, p. 108)).) The slogans of national unity turned out to be a propaganda tool aimed at restoring the legitimacy of the ruling elite, which had been lost in 1972. Denying the existence of ethnic differences primarily served to combat the alleged tribalism of the Hutu. While under Micombero's rule, Tutsi hegemony was based on their absolute control over the security forces (army, gendarmerie), the Bagaza regime sought to solidify and secure Tutsi dominance through changes in the legal system and social life. Identity cards and a residency registration requirement were introduced, severely restricting the freedom of movement, as permission to leave one's place of residence depended on approval from local authorities. The government also implemented a policy of "villagization", merging individual farms into self-sustaining economic units. (Note: "Villagization" was very unpopular among farmers, so it yielded minimal results. By 1983, the government had managed to organize only 102 villages, each consisting of 50 to 200 families. A greater success, however, was the support for agricultural cooperatives – based on more voluntary principles of operation (Lemarchand (1996, p. 109); Kay (1987, pp. 7–8)).) Officially, this policy aimed to increase agricultural production, but it was widely seen as an effort to strengthen control over the rural population. According to Reginald Kay, the hallmark of the Second Republic was primarily the discrimination in education. The authorities sought, under various pretexts, to limit the number of Hutu attending secondary schools and universities. Of the 36,000 students who completed primary education each year, only 4,000 continued to secondary school, with Hutu forming a clear minority in this group. Hutu made up only a third of the students at the University of Burundi. The most sophisticated move was making Kirundi the language of instruction in primary and secondary schools, coupled with a drastic reduction in the teaching of French. Only Tutsi from privileged families connected to the regime possessed the cultural capital required to learn French, without which any social advancement was impossible.

The official discrimination against Hutu during the Second Republic, visible in all aspects of Burundian social life, was often compared to South African apartheid.

== Policy of weakening the church from 1977 to 1987 ==
=== Origins and objectives of the regime's anti-church policy ===
Although the Burundian Roman Catholic hierarchy greeted the birth of the Second Republic with goodwill, the new government, after only a few months, began taking actions aimed at significantly reducing the influence and importance of the church. Various persecutions also fell upon Protestant churches and communities. The most extreme repression targeted the Seventh-day Adventists and Jehovah's Witnesses, whose activities were completely banned.

One of the main architects of the anti-clerical campaign was Emile Mworoha, the Secretary General of UPRONA, who was the second most powerful person in the state and the chief ideologue of the regime. This intellectual, educated at French universities, emphasized that due to colonial legacies, the state had largely ceded significant areas of social life, such as education and healthcare, to the control of the church. Following this line of thought, he argued – and government propaganda echoed this – that limiting the church's influence was primarily aimed at "eliminating the last traces of colonialism". Legal and propaganda justification for the government's actions was also provided by the 1981 constitution, which explicitly stated the secular nature of the state.

For these reasons, some researchers, including Jean-Pierre Chrétien (who privately promoted Mworoha's academic career), were inclined to view the anti-church policy of the Burundian government as an equivalent of Otto von Bismarck's Kulturkampf. Professor Witold Kieżun, who worked in Burundi in the 1980s as the head of a UN project, believed that the origins of the anti-clerical campaign were linked to President Bagaza's alleged connections with Freemasonry.

In reality, the conflict between the state and the church was primarily a result of the ethnic tensions ravaging Burundi. The regime feared that Christian churches, preaching equality of all races and nations, could encourage the Hutu to demand their rights. Furthermore, the Tutsi elites never forgot that the success of the Hutu revolution in neighboring Rwanda was largely possible due to the support provided by the Catholic Church and its affiliated secular organizations (unions, cooperatives, etc.).

It also did not escape their attention that the Rwandan church had since remained in a close alliance with the Hutu ethnocracy, as exemplified by the fact that the Archbishop of Kigali, Vincent Nsengiyumva, had for many years been a member of the central committee of the ruling party. Similar tendencies were observable in Burundi in the early 1960s, when the church maintained a distant attitude toward the progressive and nationalist program of UPRONA, while still cautiously supporting the emancipationist tendencies of the Hutu.

Particularly distrustful of the church were the Tutsi-Hima who had ruled the country since 1966, as they, due to their humble social origins, were generally open to radical social ideas. For the ruling camp, it was of little significance that the Tutsi retained considerable influence within the Burundian episcopate and among the clergy. During Bagaza's rule, five of the seven diocesan bishops were from the Tutsi-Hima group, while one of the other two came from a mixed family, and the other was from the noble Ganwa layer.

The key factor that likely triggered the conflict was, however, the fact that the Catholic Church and its affiliated secular organizations created a kind of loophole in the system of official discrimination against the Hutu, which had been created by the Tutsi regime. The church owned numerous primary and secondary schools, and catechetical centers (yaga mukama) scattered across the countryside allowed tens of thousands of Hutu children to acquire literacy skills. The Tutsi elites feared that under these circumstances, the continued operation of Catholic education could lead to the revival of the Hutu intellectuals massacred in 1972. The regime also viewed with great distrust the popular parish discussion groups, inama sahwaniya, which were prevalent in the provinces. These groups were seen as breeding grounds for Hutu leaders and dangerous competition for the local committees organized by the ruling party.

Therefore, the anti-clerical policy of Bagaza's government aimed not so much at paralyzing the church's operation altogether but at preventing it from engaging in educational and socio-charitable activities. Repressions were not applied with equal intensity across all regions. The strongest persecution affected the church's structures in the southern Bururi Province, while in the capital, for example, the repressions were relatively less noticeable.

=== Course of the anti-clerical campaign ===
The first move made by the authorities was the cancellation of religious programs and the prohibition of broadcasting Mass on state radio in 1977. This removal of religious content from public circulation was accompanied by an increasing anti-church rhetoric in state propaganda, which also extended to language. From then on, Sundays were referred to in state media as le septième jour ("the seventh day"), replacing the previous term le jour du Seigneur ("the Lord's Day").

In 1978, the government took control of Catholic primary schools, although the church was still responsible for covering the costs of their maintenance. On 9 May 1979, new regulations were implemented that prohibited the organization of prayer meetings outside parish buildings. This strike against the inama sahwaniya (prayer groups) also limited the ability of provincial residents to participate in the life of the church, as attending such meetings often meant long journeys on foot for many faithful.

These government actions prompted the Burundian episcopate to send a protest letter directly to President Bagaza. The regime was particularly irritated by the fact that this letter, along with anonymous leaflets accusing Bagaza of preparing another genocide, was later distributed during the French-African summit in Kigali (22 May 1979). Later that year, the authorities closed the Catholic newspaper Ndongozi and confiscated a transmitter owned by the Protestant Cordac radio station.

A symbolic gesture came in 1980 when the nuncio was stripped of his position as dean of the diplomatic corps accredited in Bujumbura. The government then decided that no new chaplains would be accepted to replace those retiring from the military. Efforts were also intensified to remove foreign missionaries from Burundi. They were typically expelled or denied visa extensions. As early as 1977, the government refused to extend the visa of the retired Bishop of Bururi, Joseph Martin, despite his having spent nearly 50 years in Burundi. In 1978, the authorities stripped bishops of their right to use diplomatic passports. By the end of 1979, 80 missionaries had been expelled from the country. These actions continued in subsequent years and primarily affected priests from the Bururi diocese. By 1987, a total of 550 foreign missionaries had been expelled from Burundi, reducing their number to 143. Alongside these actions against foreign clergy, a highly aggressive propaganda campaign was also launched. For example, in May 1987, the government's official newspaper Le Renouveau published a series of articles slandering Belgian missionaries. It was announced that some of the clergy were wanted Nazi war criminals.

In 1983, during a visit to West Germany, President Bagaza gave a press interview in which he declared, "We have reduced the influence of the Catholic Church, and we intend to limit it even more, although the actions we are taking are not always understood – especially in Europe". Following these statements, specific actions were soon taken. In February and March 1984, the government passed a series of regulations that limited religious freedom, though most remained largely unenforced. In response, on 12 February 1985, provincial governors received a circular signed by the Minister of Internal Affairs, Colonel Charles Kazatsa, which reminded them of the following regulations in effect:

- All religious services and meetings, including Masses, as well as any other gatherings organized under the auspices of the church or affiliated organizations, could only take place on Sundays or Saturday afternoons.
- Weddings could only occur according to a strict schedule determined by the parish priest and the local government administrator.
- Clergy were prohibited from visiting sick parishioners unless they requested confession or anointing.
- Funerary services could only accompany burials.
- Home religious services were forbidden.
- The church, if it wished to introduce a new service that would "distract the faithful from their usual activities", was required to submit a request to the Ministry of Internal Affairs at least one month in advance.
- Placing religious symbols, signs, or objects in public spaces required approval from the provincial governor. (Note: The government also ordered the destruction of many roadside crosses and chapels (Jarocki & Kieżun (2013, p. 487)).)
- Work related to the construction and maintenance of church buildings could only take place on Saturday afternoons.

The official justification for introducing the above regulations was based on economic arguments. According to the authorities, the popular morning Masses, which took people away from work on weekdays, were reducing domestic production and the absorption of foreign development aid. This situation was explained by the fact that the insufficient number of clergy and churches in rural areas forced farmers to undertake long walks, thus reducing the time and efficiency of their work. Paradoxically, however, this rhetoric contradicted other government actions, such as the refusal to grant permits for the construction of new churches and chapels, as well as the ban on organizing religious meetings outside parish buildings. In 1985, reports came from some regions of Burundi that the government, in order to prevent farmers from attending Mass, allowed the sale of coffee harvests only on Sundays.

In 1986, the government's policy towards religious groups became even more repressive. In April, the state officially took control over all Catholic and Protestant secondary schools. On September 13, the authorities announced the takeover of six Catholic seminaries. This decision, announced on the eve of the new formation year, triggered the first public protest from the episcopate. However, it did not change the government's policy in any way. On 4 October 1987, by decree of the Minister of the Interior, the government ordered the closure of yaga mukama catechetical centers, which deprived 220,000 Hutu children of the opportunity to learn to read and write. At the same time, the decree also banned the activities of Catholic Action. Furthermore, the government took steps to hit the church's finances by raising taxes on church property and officially reducing the fees paid by the faithful to the church.

In April 1987, the regime ordered the dissolution of all Catholic parish councils. Soon after, lay Catholics were banned from publicly praying, preaching the Bible, and administering Communion. Choir singing and the use of musical instruments during services were also prohibited.

Clergy and laypeople who publicly protested against the government's actions or ignored the restrictions imposed on the church faced police repression. Pierre-Claver Niyorugira, a priest from the Diocese of Ngozi, was arrested in June 1984 and imprisoned for seven weeks for organizing financial help for the wife of a certain criminal prisoner. Archbishop Joachim Ruhuna, the ordinary of the Archdiocese of Gitega, spent several months under house arrest in 1985 for criticizing the government in his pastoral letter. Shortly afterward, Father Gabriel Barakana (the former rector of the University of Burundi) and six lay Catholics were arrested on charges of insulting the head of state. In December 1985, Father Barakana was sentenced to four years in prison, while four other defendants received sentences ranging from two to five years (the priest was released from prison at the end of March 1987, probably due to pressure from foreign factors). At the beginning of October 1986, Father André Kameya, the parson in Munanira and the only Catholic priest who was a member of UPRONA, was imprisoned without any court ruling. He was likely arrested because, during Mass, he read a letter from the bishops criticizing the government's takeover of seminaries and urged his parishioners to remain steadfast in faith. In the fall of 1986, Father Jean Ndikuriyo, who had read Pope John Paul II's letter criticizing the Burundian government's actions, was arrested. In March 1987, Ndikuriyo was released under a special act of grace, but after two weeks, he was arrested again, along with two other priests. He was only released after Bagaza's downfall. At least three Catholic catechists were arrested for teaching religion on weekdays. The government also did not hesitate to close sacred buildings. In Gitega, the local cathedral, four churches, and ten other places of worship were closed.

== Reaction of the church and the international public opinion ==
Despite the widespread anti-church campaign, Burundian Catholics did not succumb to secularization. Attendance at Sunday Mass remained very high, and in parishes without priests, the faithful tried to organize communal prayers on their own as much as possible. However, the response of the hierarchical church to the anti-clerical policies of the regime was initially very cautious. For a long time, it was only ordinary clergy and lay Catholics who were willing to engage in acts of resistance, while the Burundian episcopate displayed significant submission to the authorities.

In July 1985, Bishop Michel Ntuyahaga – the bishop of the capital's Bujumbura diocese – received a letter from an anonymous author who compared the regime to Satan and called on the bishop to ignore restrictions on the freedom of worship (the letter included Bible passages describing martyrs who preferred to die rather than renounce their faith). The bishop responded with an open letter to all clergy in his diocese, stating that holding Mass on regular weekdays had no theological justification, and he discouraged provoking the government without reasonable cause.

It is likely that the Burundian episcopate feared that openly opposing the regime would invite harsher reprisals against the church. Reginald Kay suggested that the episcopate's caution may also have been influenced by the fact that most bishops were of Tutsi descent. In many ways, the government also managed to subordinate leaders of Protestant churches. An example of this is seen with Anglican Archbishop Justin Ndandali, who convinced Rose Ndayahoze – the wife of a minister killed during the 1972 massacre – not to publicly press her financial claims against the Burundian government.

It was only after nine years of the anti-clerical campaign that the Burundian episcopate issued an official and firm protest against the government's actions. On 28 September 1986, in response to the confiscation of six Catholic seminaries, the bishops issued a pastoral letter to all the faithful, in which they described the government's actions as "unjust and unacceptable expropriation".

On 10 November 1986, Pope John Paul II sent a public letter to the chairman of the Burundian episcopate, Bishop Evariste Ngoyagoye. The Pope expressed his concern about the difficult situation of the church in Burundi, assured of his solidarity, and urged clergy and the faithful to persevere. The letter also mentioned various examples of repression by the authorities against the church, assessing them as part of a "plan to discriminate against the church and its clergy through accusations, insinuations, and threats – aimed at pushing the church community to the margins of society". The Pope emphasized that the church was not seeking special privileges nor intended to intervene in matters outside its mission, but rather demanded the ability to carry out its mission while maintaining appropriate autonomy from the state. He also expressed hope that dialogue with the Burundian government would be possible. The response from the authorities, however, was swift. At the end of December 1987, President Bagaza accused the church of tarnishing Burundi's image abroad. Father Jean Ndikuriyo, who read the letter to his students, was imprisoned.

The international public's reaction to the persecution of the church in Burundi was initially indifferent. In particular, the two most important foreign partners of Burundi, Belgium and France, maintained silence. For a long time, only human rights organizations, such as Amnesty International, showed interest in the issue. Due to inaccurate information coming from Burundi, reports from human rights defenders often contained factual errors, which the government used to discredit them. (Note: The lack of access to reliable and accurate information about the situation of the church in Burundi was primarily due to the fact that the repression was most strongly felt in the provinces, where independent observers (i.e., those not affiliated with either the government or the church) had particularly limited access (Kay (1987, pp. 9–10)).)

The situation began to change in the second half of the 1980s. In January 1987, the leader of the Christian Democratic Union of Germany majority in the Landtag of the German state of Baden-Württemberg called for the suspension of aid programs to Burundi unless it was guaranteed that the "persecution of Christians" in the country would end. Over time, even the most important foreign partners began distancing themselves from Bagaza's regime. The Belgian government protested against the expulsion of missionaries with Belgian passports and then revised the technical aid program for Burundi, which led to an anti-Belgian campaign in the Burundian media. France, ruled by socialists at the time, maintained silence for the longest period. However, a shift in Paris' stance became apparent in June 1987, when Lucette Michaux-Chevry, a representative of the French Ministry of Cooperation visiting Burundi, publicly stated that she was "deeply surprised" that she had been denied entry to the cathedral in Bujumbura on a regular weekday.

== 1987 coup and its consequences ==
By the mid-1980s, Bagaza's government had become extremely unpopular across all segments of society. In the deeply conservative country, the anti-church policies of the regime provoked opposition not only among the Hutu masses but also among many Tutsi. Some members of the ruling elite were deeply concerned that the repression against the church had worsened Burundi's international image and had led to conflicts with the country's key development aid donors. Increasing dissatisfaction was also brewing within the ranks of the military and the state bureaucracy due to the widespread corruption and nepotism. A major catalyst for the outbreak of discontent was Bagaza's decision to retire a large group of officers early, which, given the country's difficult economic situation, meant actual demotion for many soldiers.

On 3 September 1987, a group of officers and non-commissioned officers carried out a bloodless coup in Burundi. Bagaza, who was attending the Francophonie summit in Quebec at the time, was stripped of all governmental and party positions. By decision of the National Salvation Military Committee, Major Pierre Buyoya, a Tutsi-Hima from Rutovu, was declared president. The new dictator was a practicing Catholic, and during Bagaza's rule, he had been a member of the central committee of UPRONA and had opposed the persecution of the church. Upon taking power, Buyoya initiated some reforms aimed at liberalizing the political system, including the release of hundreds of political prisoners and the expansion of freedom of speech. Above all, however, Buyoya sought to normalize relations with the church. He allowed the reopening of catechetical centers, yaga mukama, and permitted the return of many missionaries who had been expelled by the previous regime. All restrictions on religious freedom were lifted, and the aggressive anti-clerical propaganda in state-run media ceased.

== See also ==
- Authenticité (Zaire) (1971), which also involved hostility to the Catholic Church.

== Bibliography ==
- Gil, Czesław, ed. (1979). Listy polskich misjonarzy z Burundi [Letters of Polish Missionaries from Burundi] (in Polish). Kraków: Wydawnictwo oo. Karmelitów Bosych.
- Jarocki, Robert; Kieżun, Witold (2013). Magdulka i cały świat. Rozmowa biograficzna z Witoldem Kieżunem przeprowadzona przez Roberta Jarockiego [Magdulka and the Whole World. A Biographical Interview with Witold Kieżun Conducted by Robert Jarocki] (in Polish). Warsaw: Iskry. ISBN 978-83-244-0325-7.
- Kay, Reginald (1987). Burundi since the Genocide. London: Minority Rights Group. Archived from the original on 2015-03-30.
- Lemarchand, René (1996). Burundi: Ethnic Conflict and Genocide. Woodrow Wilson Center Press and Cambridge University Press. ISBN 0-521-56623-1.
- Lemarchand, René (2009). The Dynamics of Violence in Central Africa. Philadelphia: University of Pennsylvania Press. ISBN 978-0-8122-4120-4.
- Skutsch, Carl (1999). "Burundi: ethnic strife since 1962". In Ciment, James (ed.). Encyclopedia of conflicts since World War II. Chicago, London: Fitzroy Dearborn Publishers. ISBN 1-57958-181-1.
