= Law of Burundi =

The law of Burundi is based on the civil law system, drawing from German and French civil codes, with customary law also applying to some matters. The foundation of Burundi's legal system is the Constitution of Burundi.

The current revision of the Constitution of Burundi was adopted in a 2018 referendum which saw the reintroduction of the office of Prime Minister. The supreme authority on the interpretation of the constitution is the Constitutional Court of Burundi.

Burundian nationality law is regulated by the Constitution, and the Nationality Code of Burundi (French: Code de la nationalité burundaise)

The basic law on copyright in Burundi is Law No. 1/021 of December 30, 2005, on the Protection of Copyright and Related Rights in Burundi. Burundi has not signed the Berne Convention but it has signed the TRIPS Agreement.

Capital punishment in Burundi was abolished on 24 April 2009.

== Useful links ==
- Center for Legal Studies and Documentation (C.E.D.J): https://amategeko.gov.bi/
- Ministry of Justice: https://burundi.justice.gov.bi/
