= Corruption in Burundi =

Institutional corruption in the country

Corruption is widespread in Burundi at all levels of government. The problem is deeply entrenched and manifests in various ways, including transactional bribery involving civilians, extortion by Imbonerakure members, and large-scale embezzlement of state funds and foreign aid by political elites. Instances of corruption have occurred before colonial times, and has persisted during the colonial period, and has remained persistent in the contemporary era. The country is endowed with many resources and a good geographical location that has attracted both trade and commerce, and at the same time encouraged corruption and misuse of power. While the problem isn't new, it has worsened significantly since the end of the Burundian Civil War and the CNDD–FDD's subsequent consolidation of power, placing it among the worst in Sub-Saharan Africa.

== Pre-colonial era ==
Burundi was a kingdom under monarchs who ruled over the population and were expelled violently by European colonizers. Rulers and their mercenaries plundered the state and filled coffers of the loyalist with gold at the cost of common men. The kingdom of Nzarim was also prosperous, but made so by exploiting the local population.

== Colonial era ==
Burundi was a Germany and after that Belgian state amid the pioneer period Colombia was plundered and its goods like coffee, cotton, and minerals. Corruption got worse, and a form of crony capitalism where the officials & local elites merge to pilfer money (and do everything else corruptly). Such practices were looked at from afar by the colonial peoples, as they perpetuated exploitation and control of their lands.

=== Exploitation of resources ===
==== King Leopold II's Congo Free State ====
Burundi was a German colony, under the influence of King Leopold II's Congo Free State. Leopold's agents and officials went on to ruthlessly exploit the resources of Burundi-ivory, rubber-through forced labor. Corruption is often created as a result of the exploitation and resulted in corruption on a large scale with fund pilferage, causing of all typical other corrupt practices by the officers including policemen.

==== German colonial exploitation ====
Germany, the imperial power of what is now Burundi, extracted coffee, cotton and other natural wealth. That it forced the locals into growing cash crops for whites instead of food, causing a famine and widespread poverty. In addition, some corrupt officials pocketed monies allocated for development projects thereby gaining further personal enrichment.

The Belgian mining company, the Union Minière du Haut-Katanga, took advantage of the mineral riches of what is now Burundi, extracting copper, cobalt and uranium. The company conspired with corrupt officials to dodge its taxes and royalties, leaving Burundi with no return on the substantial natural resource's investment.

==== Reginald Karegeya ====
A stingy Burundian chieftain first collaborated with German colonial officials, Karegeya, was accused of embezzlement and corruption. He grew immensely wealthy and powerful in Burundi, establishing himself as one of the richest individuals. Bethmann-Hollweg, to whom Wolff was a colonial officer, is said to have taken money earmarked for him in development projects in Burundi. He abused his power for personal gain, providing kickbacks to himself, friends and family, leaving the estate system mired in corruption.

=== Land expropriation ===
During Burundi's colonial era, corruption was closely tied to land expropriation, with colonial powers and local elites colluding to seize land from local communities.

==== German colonial land grab (1890s-1916) ====
German colonial officials and settlers forcibly took land from Burundian farmers, often without compensation or fair payment. This led to widespread displacement and poverty among local communities. Chief Wilhelm Kahlfeldt, a German colonial official, seized large tracts of land from Burundian farmers, including the fertile Rugazi valley, to establish German settlements. After World War I, Belgian colonial officials continued the practice of land expropriation, taking land from Burundians to establish plantations and settlements. Baron Leo van der Straeten, a Belgian colonial official, expropriated land from Burundian farmers to establish a vast coffee plantation, displacing hundreds of families.

==== Chiefs' collusion (1900s-1930s) ====
Some Burundian chiefs colluded with colonial officials to acquire land from their own people, often through forced sales or fraudulent means. In 1905, Chief Ndadaye Gahutu, a Burundian chief, sold land belonging to his subjects to German colonial officials without their consent, enriching himself in the process.

==== Land speculation (1900s-1950s) ====
Colonial officials and speculators bought land cheaply from Burundians, often through coercion or fraud, and resold it at inflated prices to other colonizers. Reginald Karegeya, a Burundian chief and collaborator with German colonial officials, engaged in land speculation, buying land from his subjects and selling it to German settlers at exorbitant prices.

=== Nepotism and cronyism ===
Governor Hermann von Wissmann appointed his nephew, Ernst von Wissmann, as a district officer in Burundi on March 15, 1902, despite lacking qualifications. On November 20, 1905, von Wissmann granted a large concession to his friend, German businessman Wilhelm Schmidt, to exploit Burundi's natural resources without a public tender.

==== Belgian colonial cronyism ====
On January 10, 1925, Governor Pierre Ryckmans awarded a lucrative contract to his friend and business associate, Baron Leo van der Straeten, to construct a colonial administration building in Bujumbura without a competitive bidding process. Again, on June 15, 1930, Ryckmans appointed van der Straeten as the head of the colonial agricultural service, despite lacking experience in agriculture.

==== Chief's nepotism ====
On August 20, 1915, Burundian Chief Ndadaye Gahutu appointed his son, Prince Louis Rwagasore, as a sub-chief, despite lacking experience, and granted him large tracts of land in the Rugazi valley. On October 10, 1920, Gahutu awarded a concession to his cousin, Chief Michel Miburo, to exploit the forest resources in the Kibira forest without a public tender.

==== Colonial officials' nepotism ====
Belgian colonial official, Resident Commissioner Marcel Crochet used his daughter, Marie Crochet, as a secretary in the colonial administration without following the proper recruitment procedure on February 15, 1947. Crochet awarded a concession to Burundi’s mineral deposits on April 20, 1955.

== Modern day ==
After independence in 1962, Burundi's corruption problems persisted. The country's leaders, including President Michel Micombero and President Pierre Buyoya, were accused of embezzlement, nepotism, and other forms of corruption. The country's civil war (1993-2005) further worsened corruption, with warlords and government officials profiteering from the conflict.

Burundi has maintained its 170th place among 180 countries in the corruption perceptions index (2020) by Transparency International, which shows that corruption is still rife in Burundi today. The result is that corruption thrives in Burundi due to the conducive environment created by suppressing political opposition and civil society by the government.

== Money laundering laws ==
Burundi established many different laws and regulations with regard to anti-corruption measures and financial crime. The law 1/013 passed on 18 July 2001 criminalized money laundering as well as financing of terrorism, and gave rise to the formation of Financial Intelligence Unit (FIU) in order to probe into issues of money laundering (Akhmedov et al. 68). On the 28th of December, 2007, Law No. 1/021 began defining predicate offenses through statutes that include acts of corruption, fraud, and embezzlement, consequently increasing powers bestowed upon Financial Intelligence Units.\nRegulation number 01/04 dated February 20, 2004 introduced rules for banking institutions on keeping records about suspicious transactions and customers.

Law No. 1/035 of May 25, 2011 introduced stricter penalties for money laundering offenses, including fines and imprisonment. Law No. 1/055 of December 30, 2015 established the Asset Recovery Office to manage and recover assets linked to corruption and money laundering.

President Pierre Nkurunziza, Minister of Justice Laurent Nzeyimana, Minister of Finance Athanase Gahungu, Financial Intelligence Unit Director Emmanuel Ndayisenga, and Burundi Revenue Authority Director Egide Ndayisenga were key individuals involved in the establishment and implementation of these laws.

International organizations, such as the International Monetary Fund and the World Bank, provided technical assistance and support to Burundi in developing its anti-money laundering framework.

== Media, civil society, and resistance ==
Burundi's fight against corruption has seen contributions from the media, civil society and resistance groups. Radio Publique Africaine (RPA) was started in 2001 and has been at the forefront in fighting corruption and human rights abuses as an independent radio station. Established in 1997, Iwacu is a respected paper that has been following up on corrupt deals. The Burundi Media Group is a collection of independent media organizations formed in 2010.

The Action for the Anti-Corruption and Good Governance’s campaign was launched in the year 2004. It is a prominent organization in the field of anti-corruption which has been collaborating with various governments and international institutions globally for fighting corruption. The establishment of the Forum for Conscience and Peace took place in 2005, among others, it champions for human rights as well as good governance within communities. Coalition burundaise des défenseurs des droits de l'homme (CBDDH) was founded in 2003 and is a coalition of human rights defenders that has worked to promote human rights and combat corruption. The Mouvement pour le Résistance Nationale (MRN) was founded in 2010 and is a movement that opposes corruption in government and abuses of human rights. A resistance group that fights corruption in governance as well as challenge authoritarianism called Red-Tabara was established in 2015.

Bob Rugurika is a prominent journalist and RPA's director; he has been at the forefront of the fight against corruption and human rights violations. Antoine Kaburahe is a human rights activist who founded ALCGG; he has worked hard to uncover corruption and advocate for good governance. Pierre-Claver Mbonimpa is a human rights activist who founded FCP; he has constantly criticized government corruption and abuse of human rights.

== See also ==
- Crime in Burundi
- International Anti-Corruption Academy
- Group of States Against Corruption
- International Anti-Corruption Day
- United Nations Convention against Corruption
- OECD Anti-Bribery Convention
- Transparency International
