= Transitional Senate of Burundi (2001) =

The Transitional Senate of Burundi was the upper house of the Parliament of Burundi designated in 2001 under the transitional constitution. It sat until 2005.

== History ==
The Senate was re-established following the Arusha Accords. The transitional constitution was adopted on 18 October 2001. The transitional senate was designated by the President and Vice-President of Burundi, and by the Office of the National Assembly, and was designed to balance political, ethic and regional representation. It was chaired by Libère Bararunyeretse and included the three former heads of state, three Twa people and at least two people with different ethnicity from each province.

== Members ==
Members of the transitional senate were, in alphabetical order:

- Bagaza, Jean-Baptiste
- Bararunyeretse, Libère
- Baricako, Anne-Marie
- Barikore, Gustave
- Bayaga, Evariste
- Bicishimisi, Judith
- Bikomagu, Jean
- Bitariho, Raphaël
- Bizimana, Clotilde
- Bukuru, Josias
- Buname, Alexandre
- Buyoya, Pierre
- Gahigi, Frédérique
- Ciza, Victor
- Habonimana, Stany
- Kabura, François
- Kabura Marie, Rose
- Kamwenubusa, Emile
- Kanyenkiko, Anatole
- Karenzo, Pélagie
- Karibwami, Désiré
- Manwangari, Jean Baptiste
- Misigaro, Michel
- Mugemencuro, Aloys
- Mukorako, Georges
- Nahimana, Pierre-Claver
- Ndabaneze, Immaculée
- Ndayisaba, Joseph
- Ndayishimiye, Etienne
- Ndimurukundo, Nicéphore
- Nikobamye, Gaétan
- Niragira, Consolate
- Nitunga, Nestor
- Niyobampama, Libère
- Niyongabo, Gérard
- Nkurunziza, Pascal
- Ntaganzwa, Benoît
- Ntagwirumugara, Christine
- Ntahonkiriye, Omer
- Ntambuka, Issa
- Nteziyaremye, Anatole
- Ntibantunganya, Sylvestre
- Ntibarutaye, Pierre
- Ntureka, Louis
- Nzabampema, Frédéric
- Nzoyisaba, Cathérine
- Ruzobavako, Séverin
- Sabuwanka, Elie
- Sahinguvu, Yves
- Segatwa, Fabien
- Simbagoye, Naftal
- Sindayigaya, Ferdinand

== Sources ==
- Burundi (06/09), U.S. State Department
- Transitional Senate (in French), Senate of the Republic of Burundi
