= Rwira =

- Village
- Location in Burundi
- Coordinates: 3°52′45″S 29°46′11″E
- Country: Burundi
- Province: Bururi Province
- Commune: Commune of Rutovu
- Time zone: UTC+2 (Central Africa Time)

Rwira is an agricultural village in the Commune of Rutovu in Bururi Province in southern Burundi. It lies to the west of Rutovu. It is a place known for its bean production.
