= President of Burundi =

Head of state

President of the Republic of Burundi
- Umukuru W'igihugu c' Uburundi (Kirundi); Président de la République du Burundi (French)
- Coat of arms of Burundi

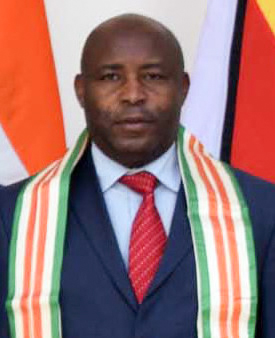
- Incumbent; Évariste Ndayishimiye since 18 June 2020
- Executive branch in Burundian politics
- Style: His Excellency (formal); Nyenicubahiro umukuru w'igihugu (Kirundi); Mr. President (informal)
- Status: Head of state
- Member of: Council of Ministers; National Security Council
- Residence: Ntare Rushatsi House
- Seat: Gitega, Burundi
- Appointer: Direct popular vote
- Term length: Seven years, renewable once
- Constituting instrument: Constitution of Burundi (2005); Amended Constitution of Burundi (2018)
- Precursor: King of Burundi (as Head of State); Prime Minister (as Head of Government)
- Formation: Proclamation of the First Republic; 28 November 1966; 59 years ago
- First holder: Michel Micombero
- Deputy: President of the National Assembly of Burundi (in the presidential line of succession)
- Salary: US$47,300 annually
- Website: Official website (French and English versions) kwantare.gov.bi (Kirundi version)

The president of Burundi, officially the president of the republic (French: Président de la République; Kirundi: Umukuru W'igihugu c' Uburundi), is the head of state of the Republic of Burundi. The president is also commander-in-chief of the National Defence Force. The office of the presidency was established when Michel Micombero declared Burundi a republic on 28 November 1966. The first constitution to specify the powers and duties of the president was the constitution of 1974 adopted in 1976. The constitution, written by Micombero, affirmed Micombero's position as the first president of Burundi. The powers of the president currently derive from the 2005 constitution implemented as a result of the 2000 Arusha Accords after the Burundian Civil War. The current president since 18 June 2020 is Évariste Ndayishimiye.

The president's stated role is to represent Burundi's national unity and ensure that the laws and functions of the state are created and executed with full compliance in the constitution. The president is granted a variety of powers throughout the constitution. Title V establishes the executive powers granted to the president and Title VI establishes legislative powers granted to the president. The president has the power to appoint military commanders, ambassadors, magistrates, provincial governors and members of various national councils. The president also appoints all judges, including those of the Supreme Court and Constitutional Court. The president can organize government and can call for parliamentary sessions under extraordinary circumstances. In addition to promulgating legislation, the president has the power to propose and amend laws and can veto laws that parliament is unable to agree upon. The president can also amend the constitution. The president represents Burundi in international affairs by signing and ratifying its treaties. The president is the sole office to manage war, but needs approval from parliament and the National Council of Security to start wars. The president is the sole post that can authorize military action. The president is also the sole post to grant civil and military awards.

A presidential term is seven years, and a president can serve two terms. The president is assisted by two presidentially appointed vice-presidents; however, the 2018 Burundian constitutional referendum passed to eventually reduce the number of vice-presidents to one. The president is entitled to a pension after the end of their final term of office.

== Origin ==
In 1966, Michel Micombero became a rallying force for opposition to king Ntare V of Burundi. When Ntare V promoted Micombero to the post of Prime Minister of Burundi, Micombero launched the November 1966 Burundian coup d'état. Micombero overthrew Ntare V and declared Burundi a republic and himself its president. Micombero formalized his role as president in his 1974 constitution formally adopted in 1976. The constitution guaranteed Micombero's presidency and established a one-party state led by the Union for National Progress (UPRONA). Political instability continued in Burundi. After the 1987 Burundian coup d'état, Pierre Buyoya seized the post of the presidency and implemented the 1992 constitution. The new constitution instituted multiparty elections in Burundi. Opposition to the change started the Burundian Civil War in 1993. In 1996, Buyoya returned to power and sought reconciliation and transition to democracy. In 2000, the Arusha Accords were signed by all three sides of the conflict, and between 2000 and 2005, Buyoya and Domitien Ndayizeye worked under the 2001 and 2004 transitional constitutions to transition Burundi to democracy. The 2005 constitution is a final product of the transition. The powers and duties of the presidency are enshrined within the 2005 constitution.

== Powers and duties ==
=== Executive powers ===
The president is both head of state and head of government. The president is tasked with representing the republic of Burundi, ensuring the integrity of the constitution, and executing the functions of the state and its laws. The president is assisted by two vice-presidents. The president shares many powers and duties with the two-vice presidents and can delegate powers, with exceptions, to them. The president arranges the government with approval from the vice-presidents. The president has the power to direct the agenda of the government and provides executive instructions for the two vice-presidents through presidential decree. The president appoints military commanders and ambassadors with approval from the Senate. The president dictates the agenda of the ambassadors and can recall them. The president also appoints provincial governors after approval from the two vice-presidents and confirmation from the Senate. The president has the power to declare a state of emergency after approval from the cabinet, the National Assembly, the Senate, the National Council of Security and the Constitutional Court.

The president serves as the commander-in-chief of the military. The president has the sole power to authorize use of the military and has the power to declare and end wars with approval of the National Assembly, Senate and National Council of Security.

The president has the power of pardon with approval from the two vice-presidents and the Superior Council of the Magistracy.

The president grants civil and military decorations. The president serves as the figure to whom all members of government are responsible.

=== Legislative powers ===
The president has the power to propose law and can amend laws related to the domain of law with approval from the Constitutional Court. The president promulgates law and validates law in accordance with the constitution and the Constitutional Court. The president has the power to organize special sessions and may assemble the government yearly to discuss Burundi's budget. If the government is unable to agree upon the passage of a bill, the president has the power to either veto the bill or request the National Assembly to make a final decision.

=== Judicial powers ===
The president ensures the independence of the judiciary. The president leads the Superior Council of the Magistracy and appoints magistrates with approval from the Senate. The president has the power to appoint all judges, including those of the Supreme Court and Constitutional Court. The president requires approval from the Supreme Council of the Magistracy and Senate to appoint judges to the Supreme Court and requires approval from the Senate to appoint judges to the Constitutional Court.

=== Matters of defense ===
The president has the duty of informing the National Assembly and Senate if use of the military is authorized and must organize a special session for this purpose if the government is not already meeting. The president is explicitly bound by the constitution to follow international military law. The president has the sole power to allow foreign soldiers into Burundi.

=== Matters of council ===
The president appoints the members of truth and reconciliation councils, which the president also oversees. The president also appoints the members of the National Council of Security, the Economic, financial and Social Council, and the National Council of Communication.

=== Matters of diplomacy ===
The president represents Burundi internationally. The president negotiates, signs and ratifies treaties in accordance with the constitution and the Constitutional Court.

=== Amending the Constitution ===
The president has the power to amend the constitution.

== Selection ==
=== The first president post-transition ===
The 2005 constitution distinguishes between a first president and subsequent presidents. The first president is elected by a two-thirds majority vote by the National Assembly and Senate. If the first president is absent for any reason, another person is elected as first president through the same means.

=== Eligibility ===
To be eligible for the presidency, a candidate is required to be a national of Burundi by descent. Candidates must reside within Burundi when their candidacies are announced, and the candidates must be at least 40 years old upon conclusion of the election. Additionally, candidates must be valid voters and must not be facing penalty according to electoral law. Each candidate also requires 200 supporters, all of whom must also be valid voters.

The first president is not eligible for election.

=== Election process ===
Candidates for the presidency must either announce themselves as independents or be sponsored by specific political parties. Burundi's population, endowed with universal suffrage, elects the president by an absolute majority vote in two rounds. If there is no candidate that wins an absolute majority in the first round, then a second round with the top two candidates from the first rounds is held.

The election is held between one and two months before the end of the incumbent's tenure.

=== Post-election ===
The president is not allowed to hold other occupations during presidential tenure. If a candidate occupies another public office, their tenure in that office ends immediately upon declaration of the election results. If a candidate occupies a private sector office, they are barred from further business action immediately upon declaration of the election results.

== Succession in absence ==
If the president is temporarily unable to carry out their duties, then the first vice-president assumes the duties of the president until the president is again able to perform their role. If neither the president nor the first vice-president are present, then the second vice-president assumes the duties of the president.

If the president dies, resigns, or is otherwise made permanently unable to carry out their duties, then the duties of the president are carried out by the president of the National Assembly. If the president of the National Assembly is not able to act as president, then the vice-presidents, with assistance from the rest of the government, act jointly as president. A new election for president is immediately conducted unless an emergency has been declared by the Constitutional Court.

== Removal ==
The president can be impeached if two-thirds of both the National Assembly and Senate agree on impeachment. Grounds for impeachment include "grave fault, abuse of power, corruption" and high treason. The president is removed from office if the High Court of Justice convicts the president of a crime.

== Latest election ==
Candidate	Party	Votes	%
Évariste Ndayishimiye	CNDD–FDD	3,082,210	71.45
Agathon Rwasa	National Congress for Liberty	1,084,788	25.15
Gaston Sindimwo	Union for National Progress	73,353	1.70
Domitien Ndayizeye	Kira Burundi Coalition	24,470	0.57
Léonce Ngendakumana	Front for Democracy in Burundi	21,232	0.49
Dieudonné Nahimana	Independent	18,709	0.43
Francis Rohero	Independent	8,942	0.21
Total		4,313,704	100.00
Valid votes		4,313,704	96.18
Invalid/blank votes		171,224	3.82
Total votes		4,484,928	100.00
Registered voters/turnout		5,113,418	87.71
Source: CENI
