= 1982 Burundian parliamentary election =

- 22 October 1982
- 52 of the 65 seats in the National Assembly
Party	Leader	Vote %	Seats	+/–
UPRONA	Jean-Baptiste Bagaza	100	52	+31
This lists parties that won seats. See the complete results below.
Seats by constituency
Speaker after
Emile Mworoha; UPRONA

Parliamentary elections were held in Burundi on 22 October 1982, the first since 1965. Following a constitutional referendum the year before, the country had become a one-party state with the Union for National Progress (UPRONA) as the sole legal party. The party nominated 104 candidates to contest the 52 seats in the enlarged National Assembly. Following the election, in which turnout was reported to be 95%, President Jean-Baptiste Bagaza appointed a further 13 members.

== Results ==
Party	Seats	+/–
Union for National Progress	52	+31
Presidential appointees	13	New
Total	65	+32
Source: IPU
