= 2005 Burundian communal elections =

Communal elections were held in Burundi on 3 June and 7 June 2005. The elections were won by the National Council for the Defense of Democracy – Forces for the Defense of Democracy (CNDD-FDD), which won 1,781 of the 3,225 seats.

== Electoral system ==
Each of the 129 communes had 25 seats.

== Conduct ==
The election was largely peaceful in most parts of the country, however, violence and intimidation in some communes of Bujumbura Rural and Bubanza provinces led to a re-poll held on 7 June. Observers considered the communal elections generally free and fair, despite some minor irregularities.

== Results ==
Party	Votes	%	Seats
CNDD–FDD			1,781
Front for Democracy in Burundi			822
Union for National Progress			260
National Council for the Defense of Democracy			135
Movement for the Rehabilitation of Citizens – Rurenzangemero			88
Party for National Recovery			75
Other parties			64
Total			3,225
Total votes	2,544,669	–	
Registered voters/turnout	3,157,158	80.60	
Source: EISA (seats)
