= Martin Ndayahoze =

Commandant Martin Ndayahoze (died 30 April 1972) was a Burundian military officer and government official who served variously as Minister of Information, Minister of Economy, and Deputy Chief of Staff of the Burundian National Army. He was the only Hutu military officer to serve in government under President Michel Micombero and frequently warned of the dangers of ethnic violence in his reports to the presidency. He was executed in 1972.

== Early life ==
Martin Ndayahoze was born in Kamenge, Bujumbura. He was ethnically Hutu. He attended a technical school in Kamenge for four years and thereafter studied at the École spéciale militaire de Saint-Cyr in France. He married Rose Karambuzi, a Tutsi from Rwanda, on 3 October 1967 and had three sons with her.

== Career ==
Upon the completion of his studies at Saint-Cyr in 1965, Ndayahoze returned to Burundi and was commissioned as a second lieutenant in the Burundian National Army. He was one of the few well-educated Hutu to serve in the army officer corps. In July 1966 he was appointed Minister of Information. He was the only Hutu military officer to be given a government post by Prime Minister—and later President—Michel Micombero, and was one of Micombero's few Hutu confidants. On 10 December 1966 he was by presidential decree promoted to the rank of captain-commandant, retroactive to 1 November 1966. In August 1968 he was made Secretary General of the Union pour le Progrès national (UPRONA), the ruling party in Burundi. In early September 1969 he was contacted by a group of Hutu conspirators who informed him of their plan to launch a coup against President Micombero on the night of 16/17 September. Instead of assisting them, Ndayahoze warned Micombero and as a result 70 people were arrested. Thereafter, Micombero heavily relied on him to calm Hutus in Burundi and prevent ethnic revolt. His tenure as Minister of Information ended in December.

In May 1970 Ndayahoze was appointed Minister of Economy. On 3 March 1971 he was dismissed from his ministerial office and attached to the Army General Staff as Deputy Chief of Staff in charge of logistics. Throughout 1971 and 1972 he wrote frequently in his reports to the presidency of the dangers of worsening ethnic relations in Burundi.

== Death ==
On 29 April 1972 Hutu rebels launched attacks in Bujumbura and southern Burundi. As it suppressed the rebellion, the Burundian government embarked on a programme of ethnic repression, targeting the country's remaining Hutu elites, including those who had served in government and the military. Ndayahoze disappeared after being summoned to a crisis meeting early in the morning on 30 April. It was later revealed that he had been arrested and executed, making him one of the first Hutu officials to be murdered by the regime during its repression. Burundian officials alleged that under interrogation he admitted to plotting the rebellion against the government with other Hutus. In 1987 the widow of Ndayahoze sought compensation for the murder of her husband and on behalf of other families with members who were victims of the 1972 repression. At the request of the Burundian ambassador, she was barred from the UN headquarters building in New York. She later compiled his writings and published them in a book, Le commandant Martin Ndayahoze, un visionnaire.

== Works cited ==
- Chrétien, Jean-Pierre; Dupaquier, Jean-François (2007). Burundi 1972, au bord des génocides (in French). Paris: Karthala Editions. ISBN 9782845868724.
- Lemarchand, René (1970). Rwanda and Burundi. New York: Praeger Publishers. OCLC 254366212.
- Russell, Aiden (2019). Politics and Violence in Burundi: The Language of Truth in an Emerging State. Cambridge University Press. ISBN 9781108499347.
- Weinstein, Warren (1976). Historical Dictionary of Burundi. Metuchen: Scarecrow Press. ISBN 9780810809628.
