= 1987 Burundian coup d'état =

1987 coup d'état in Burundi

- Location of Burundi in Central Africa
- Date: 3 September 1987
- Location: Bujumbura, Burundi
- Type: Military coup
- Motive: Regime change
- Target: Presidential Palace, Bujumbura
- Organised by: Pierre Buyoya
- Outcome: Coup succeeds: Jean-Baptiste Bagaza is ousted by Pierre Buyoya; Formation of the Military Committee for National Salvation; Buyoya is inaugurated as president

The 1987 Burundian coup d'état was a bloodless military coup that took place in Burundi on 3 September 1987. Tutsi president Jean-Baptiste Bagaza was deposed whilst traveling abroad and succeeded by Tutsi Major Pierre Buyoya.

== Background ==
Jean-Baptiste Bagaza was appointed president of Burundi following a military coup in 1976, that deposed Michel Micombero. As president of the Union for National Progress (UPRONA) party, he was the sole candidate in the 1984 presidential election and was re-elected with 99.6% of the votes. During Bagaza's presidency, there were long-standing tensions over the repression of the Catholic Church, in a country where 65 percent of citizens were practicing Catholics. This was later described by diplomats as a key factor in the coup.

== Coup and aftermath ==
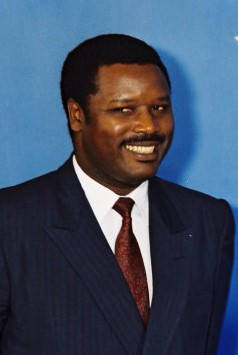
Pierre Buyoya, who took power in the coup, pictured in 1990

In September 1987, Bagaza travelled to Quebec, Canada, to attend a francophone summit. The army took over, led by Bagaza's cousin, Major Pierre Buyoya. Hearing of the coup, Bagaza immediately returned to Africa but Bujumbura Airport was closed, and in Nairobi, he was refused entrance to Kenya. Following the coup, Bagaza fled to Uganda, and then in 1989, Libya, where he was granted political asylum.

Buyoya formed the Military Committee for National Salvation to take control, suspended the country's constitution and was inaugurated as president on 2 October 1987. Buyoya, a Roman Catholic, said that he would lift measures imposed on the Catholic Church by Bagaza's government. He was succeeded by Melchior Ndadaye following the 1993 presidential election, and came to power in Burundi for a second time following a military coup in 1996, that ousted Sylvestre Ntibantunganya.
