= 1996 Burundian coup d'état =

Military coup in Burundi

- Part of Burundian Civil War
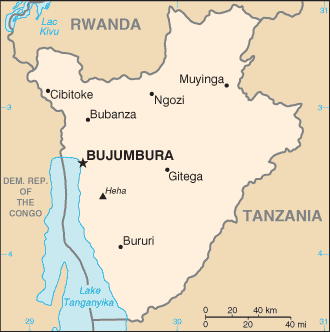
- A CIA WFB map of Burundi
- Date: 25 July 1996
- Location: Bujumbura, Burundi
- Type: Military coup
- Motive: Regime change
- Target: Presidential Palace, Bujumbura
- Organised by: Pierre Buyoya
- Outcome: Coup succeeds: Sylvestre Ntibantunganya is ousted by former president Pierre Buyoya; Buyoya is inaugurated as interim president

The 1996 Burundian coup d'état was a military coup d'état that took place in Burundi on 25 July 1996. In the midst of the Burundi Civil War, former president Pierre Buyoya (a Tutsi) deposed Hutu President Sylvestre Ntibantunganya. According to Amnesty International, in the weeks following the coup, more than 6,000 people were killed in the country. This was Buyoya's second successful coup, having overthrown Jean-Baptiste Bagaza in 1987.

== Background ==
Tutsi Pierre Buyoya first came to power in Burundi following a military coup in September 1987, when he deposed Jean-Baptiste Bagaza. Buyoya was president until the country's first democratic presidential election on 27 June 1993, which was won by Hutu Melchior Ndadaye. On 21 October, Ndadaye was assassinated, sparking the Burundi Civil War between Hutu and Tutsi groups. Moderate Hutu Cyprien Ntaryamira became president in February 1994, but both he and Rwandan president Juvénal Habyarimana were assassinated in April that year, an event that sparked the Rwandan genocide. Ntaryamira was succeeded by another Hutu leader, Sylvestre Ntibantunganya.

== July 1996 events ==
On 21 July 1996, Hutu rebels attacked a refugee camp in the country and killed more than 300 people. On 23 July, President Ntibantunganya went into hiding at the home of U.S. ambassador Morris N. Hughes, Jr. The army took power on 25 July, a move announced over the radio by Defense Minister Firmin Sinzoyiheba. Pierre Buyoya was named interim president. He announced the suspension of the constitution, the dissolution of the National Assembly, and the banning of political parties, but declared that he would guarantee Ntibantunganya's safety. The military takeover was condemned by international leaders including U.S. president Bill Clinton, United Nations Secretary-General Boutros Boutros-Ghali and the head of the Organisation of African Unity, Salim Ahmed Salim. It was the fourth such takeover of the Burundian government since the country's independence in 1962, and the second to result in Buyoya taking power.

== Aftermath ==
According to Amnesty International, in the weeks immediately following the coup, more than 6,000 people were killed in the country. Ntibantunganya later entered negotiations with Buyoya, who agreed to provide him with a home in the Bujumbura suburb of Kiriri. He left the United States Embassy on 8 June 1997, saying, "I reaffirm that I shall not yield on the principle for a search for a negotiated solution for all problems that face our country." Buyoya was succeeded as president in 2003 by Domitien Ndayizeye. The civil war continued until 2005.
