= Party for National Recovery =

Political party in Burundi

The Party for National Recovery (French: Parti pour le Redressement National, PARENA) is a minor political party in Burundi. It was founded in May 1994 by the former president Jean-Baptiste Bagaza. Bagaza, an ethnic Tutsi, had established a military dictatorship in Burundi from 1976 until his deposition in 1987, after which he lived in exile. He was allowed to return to the country during its democratization under Pierre Buyoya after 1992.

PARENA draws most of its support from the Tutsi minority. In the June 2005 local elections the party received 2.3 percent of the vote, winning 75 of the 3,225 seats on local councils. The party received 1.7% of the vote in the July 2005 parliamentary elections, but failed to win a seat. Its support remained low thereafter. In 2014 Bagaza resigned the leadership of the party and was replaced by Zénon Nimubona.

PARENA was accused of having links with Tutsi militias in 2000 and of encouraging violence against the Front for Democracy in Burundi (FRODEBU), a Hutu party. It was said in 1996 to have a youth wing called the Front of Patriotic Youth (Front de la jeunesse patriotique, FJP).
