= 1981 Burundian constitutional referendum =

- 18 November 1981

Results
Choice	Votes	%
Yes	1,582,244	99.28%
No	11,539	0.72%
Valid votes	1,593,783	99.32%
Invalid or blank votes	10,939	0.68%
Total votes	1,604,722	100.00%
Registered voters/turnout	1,702,623	94.25%

A constitutional referendum was held in Burundi on 18 November 1981. The new constitution would make the country a presidential republic with a unicameral National Assembly, as well as creating a one-party state with the Union for National Progress (UPRONA) as the sole legal party. It was supported by 99.28% of voters with a 94% turnout.

== Results ==
Choice	Votes	%
For	1,582,244	99.28
Against	11,539	0.72
Invalid/blank votes	10,939	–
Total	1,604,722	100
Registered voters/turnout	1,702,623	94.25
Source: African Elections Database
