= 2005 Burundian parliamentary election =

Parliamentary elections were held in Burundi on 4 July 2005. The result was a victory for the National Council for the Defense of Democracy – Forces for the Defense of Democracy (CNDD–FDD), which won 64 of the 118 seats in the National Assembly

== Conduct ==
Voting was largely peaceful throughout the country during election day. Observers deemed the polls generally free, fair, and transparent while the major political parties accepted the results as legitimate.

== Results ==
=== National Assembly ===
In order to ensure the 60%-40% ethnic split and 30% quota for women, a further 18 members, including the three Twa representatives foreseen by the Electoral Code, were co-opted after the elections.

Party	Votes	%	Seats		
Party	Votes	%	Elected	Co-opted	Total
CNDD–FDD	1,417,800	58.55	59	5	64
Front for Democracy in Burundi	525,336	21.70	25	5	30
Union for National Progress	174,575	7.21	10	5	15
National Council for the Defense of Democracy	100,366	4.14	4	0	4
Movement for the Rehabilitation of Citizens – Rurenzangemero	51,730	2.14	2	0	2
Party for National Recovery	42,223	1.74	0	0	0
Other parties and independents	109,396	4.52	0	0	0
Co-opted Twa members			–	3	3
Total	2,421,426	100.00	100	18	118
Valid votes	2,421,426	99.00			
Invalid/blank votes	24,575	1.00			
Total votes	2,446,001	100.00			
Registered voters/turnout	3,167,124	77.23			
Source: African Elections Database

=== Senate ===
Following the National Assembly elections, the Senate was indirectly elected on 29 July. Of the 49 Senate members, 34 were elected by electoral colleges formed by councillors, three were co-opted Twas, four were former Presidents, and eight further members were co-opted to ensure that at least 30% of its members were women. A total of 119 candidates stood for election to the Senate.

Party	Votes	%	Seats		
Party	Votes	%	Elected	Co-opted	Total
CNDD–FDD			30	2	32
Front for Democracy in Burundi			3	2	5
National Council for the Defense of Democracy			1	2	3
Union for National Progress			0	2	2
Co-opted Twa members			–	3	3
Former presidents			–	4	4
Total			34	15	49
Valid votes	1,097	50.76			
Invalid/blank votes	1,064	49.24			
Total votes	2,161	100.00			
Registered voters/turnout	3,225	67.01			
Source: African Elections Database, IPU
