= Jean-Baptiste Bagaza =

President of Burundi from 1976 to 1987

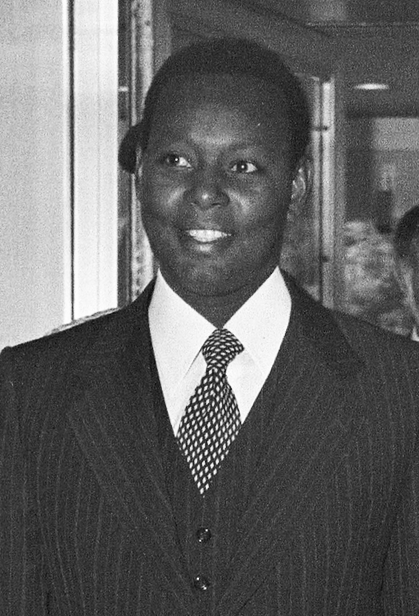
- Bagaza in 1978

2nd President of Burundi
- In office 1 November 1976 – 3 September 1987
- Prime Minister: Édouard Nzambimana (1976‍–‍1978)
- Preceded by: Michel Micombero
- Succeeded by: Pierre Buyoya

Personal details
- Born: 29 August 1946 Rutovu, Ruanda-Urundi
- Died: 4 May 2016 (aged 69) Brussels, Belgium
- Party: UPRONA; PARENA
- Spouse: Fausta Bagaza
- Children: 4

Military service
- Allegiance: Burundi
- Branch/service: Burundi Armed Forces
- Rank: Colonel
- Criminal information
- Conviction: Conspiracy against former president Pierre Buyoya

Details
- Imprisoned at: Mpanga Prison (1997)

Jean-Baptiste Bagaza (29 August 1946 – 4 May 2016) was a Burundian army officer and politician who ruled Burundi as president and de facto military dictator from November 1976 to September 1987.

Born into the Tutsi ethnic group in 1946, Bagaza served in the Burundian military and rose through the ranks under the rule of Michel Micombero after his rise to power in 1966. Bagaza deposed Micombero in a bloodless coup d'état in 1976 and took power himself as head of the ruling Union for National Progress (Union pour le Progrès national, UPRONA). Despite having participated in the genocidal killings of 1972, he introduced various reforms which modernised the state and made concessions to the country's ethnic Hutu majority. His regime became increasingly repressive after it became consolidated in 1984, especially targeting the powerful Catholic Church. His rule lasted until 1987 when his regime was overthrown in a further coup d'état and he was forced into exile. He returned to Burundi in 1994 and became involved in national politics as the leader of the Party for National Recovery (Parti pour le Redressement National, PARENA). He died in 2016.

== Biography ==
=== Early life and military career ===
Bagaza was born in Rutovu, Bururi Province in Belgian-ruled Ruanda-Urundi on 29 August 1946. His family were ethnic Hima, part of the wider Tutsi ethnic group. After studying in Catholic schools in Bujumbura, he enlisted in the army of the newly independent Kingdom of Burundi. He was sent to Belgium in 1966 where he studied at the Royal Military Academy in Brussels until 1971. He earned a sociology degree. He returned to Burundi in 1972. Bagaza was involved in President Michel Micombero's genocidal killings of ethnic Hutu in 1972, though the "extent or nature of his involvement" remain unclear. In May he was, at the rank of captain, appointed adjunct chief of staff of the Burundian military in charge of logistics—largely because of his family's connections to the Micombero, replacing purged Hutu officer Martin Ndayahoze. In November he was promoted to the rank of lieutenant colonel and made chief of the general staff. In May 1975 he was appointed to the Chamber of Accounts under the Supreme Court.

=== Dictatorship ===
Bagaza overthrew Micombero in a military coup on 1 November 1976. The constitution was temporarily suspended by a military junta, the 30-member Supreme Revolutionary Council, which declared Bagaza president on 10 November 1976. He was thirty at the time. Bagaza initiated a number of reforms after taking power, attacking corruption and making modest reforms to improve conditions for Hutu who had been targeted under the Micombero regime. He reformed taxation and the administration. He earned respect for his work ethic, as he "drove himself to work at 7:30 a.m. each day" instead of travelling in large cavalcades as most regional politicians did at the time. Some Hutu refugees were allowed to return from exile in Zaire and Tanzania where they had fled during the genocide. Bagaza granted a few government posts to Hutu, appointing two Hutu ministers in his first cabinet. Burundi's feudal system of land tenure, known as the Ubugererwa, was abolished in 1977. Some Tutsi-held land was transferred to Hutu farmers. The end of the Ubugererwa as well as the abolition of the ikori poll tax earned Bagaza much goodwill among Hutu.

Officially, Bagaza attempted to address the country's ethnic tensions by banning all mention of ethnicity, declaring that everyone was just Burundian or, more broadly, African. He emphasized Kirundi as the common language of all Burundians, the "social solidarity" of the peasants, and the country's rich oral tradition. Political scientist René Lemarchand described this emphasis on national unity as a cornerstone of Bagaza's regime. Despite this, Lemarchand and researcher Nigel Watt argued that this move was just disguising the continued dominance of the Tutsi elite. Bagaza ensured that the Tutsi remained economically and politically dominant. From 1976 to 1979, the Supreme Revolutionary Council was solely composed of Tutsi officers, while only three Hutu served in the cabinet, namely Damien Barakanfitiye (Public Service), Ladislas Barutwanayo (Transport and Aeronautics), and Joseph Nzeyimana (Social Services and Labor). There were no Hutu among the governors, and the vast majority of the Burundian parliamentarians remained Tutsi. In fact, the marginalization of Hutu in the economy and education increased during Bagaza's rule. This resulted in the emergence of the radical PALIPEHUTU party and militant group.

Under Bagaza, a programme of economic modernization was begun to allow the emergence of small-scale capitalist agriculture, involving the construction of two new hydroelectric dams which still form the basis for Burundi's energy infrastructure. He also initiated road building programs, expanded the availability of drinking water, and developed a port on Lake Tanganyika. His infrastructure investments helped to shape Burundi's export ecenomy which came to rely on coffee, tea and sugar. He remained well remembered for his infrastructure improvements and development projects in Burundi. (Note: This is also reflected in popular culture, with a Burundian joke being: "Bagaza built the roads, Buyoya made the speed bumps and Frodebu created the potholes.") Internationally, Bagaza successfully maneuvered between different political factions, securing economic aid from the Western Bloc, the Eastern Bloc, China, and the Arab world. He expelled the large Congolese migrant community from Burundi, claiming that they had just decided to leave on their own.

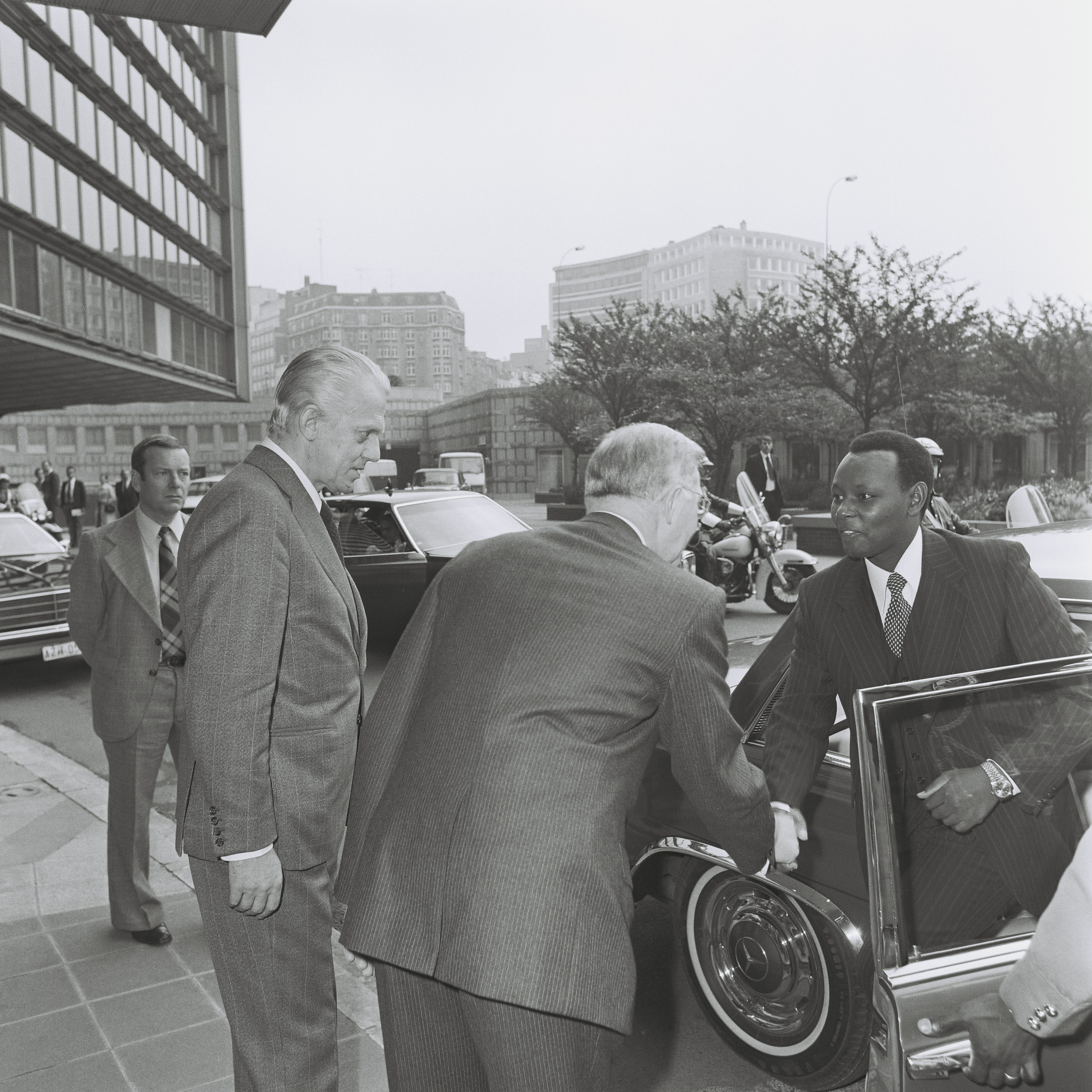
Visit of Jean-Baptiste Bagaza, President and Minister for Defence of Brurundi, to the CEC.

In 1979, the Supreme Revolutionary Council dissolved. Afterward, the once-powerful Union for National Progress (Union pour le Progrès national, UPRONA) political party experienced a resurgence and became the "all-embracing, strongly structured instrument of political mobilization" for the Bagaza regime. UPRONA's growing role in the government was spearheaded by its general-secretary Emile Mworoha who became the second most powerful person in the country after Bagaza. Lemarchand judged that many innovations of Bagaza's regime could be credited to Mworoha. However, not all of the government's efforts were popular. Bagaza pushed for the "villagization" of Burundi's rural areas, seeking to collect the common hamlets of the countryside into larger, concentrated villages. This policy partially sought to increase agriculture efficiency, but also allowed for any easier control of the rural population. The villagization was highly unpopular. Coinciding with these attempts at greater rural control, Bagaza gradually started an anti-clerical campaign from 1977/78, as the Catholic Church in Burundi expanded its literary classes for children as well as the inama sahwaniya, grassroots discussion groups overseen by rural parishes. These Church-sponsored measures mainly benefited poor Hutu. Bagaza's regime thus regarded them as attempts to undermine the dominance of the state as well as the Tutsi elite, responding with anti-clerical policies.

Location of Burundi in Central Africa.

Bagaza's regime introduced a new national constitution in 1981 which consolidated Burundi as a one-party dictatorship under UPRONA, which he re-organised under his own leadership. In the election of 1984, he was re-elected president with 99.6 percent of the national vote. After the election, Bagaza organized a military operation against the Catholic Church in Burundi, regarding it as a threat to his power. The Church was increasingly targeted as the regime became increasingly repressive. Foreign missionaries were expelled and attempts were made to break its influence over the public and education. Bagaza escalated his anti-clerical campaign, banning Catholic media and church services, closing Church-run literacy centers, nationalizing Church-run schools, and ordering the arrest and torture of Church figures. He ordered the closure of 87 churches, including Gitega Cathedral. Protestant media was also targeted. He also tried to implement other "eccentricities" such as restricting bar openings and officially limiting the time as well as money Burundians were allowed to spend for traditional betrothal and mourning ceremonies. Bob Krueger argued that these policies ultimately alienated too many Burundians and led to Bagaza's deposition, a view shared by Watt.

=== Deposition and involvement in democratic politics ===
A military coup broke out in September 1987, led by Major Pierre Buyoya, while Bagaza was abroad in Quebec, Canada. The coup was reportedly organized by non-commissioned officers who had disapproved of Bagaza's plan to limit army service to ten years and to end the soldiers' right to free electricity for living spaces outside barracks. Buyoya successfully deposed Bagaza's regime and established himself as president. Bagaza himself went into exile in neighbouring Uganda and later in Libya where he lived until 1993. Opposed to the empowerment of Hutu through the 1993 elections, he reportedly played a major part in the coup d'état against Melchior Ndadaye, Burundi's first democratically elected president. The putschists killed Ndadaye, but failed to maintain control. Power was consequently returned to a civilian, democratic government. Bagaza subsequently denied any involvement in the putsch. Despite the coup's failure, he returned to Burundi where he founded the Party for National Recovery (Parti pour le Redressement National, PARENA). PARENA was described as a Tutsi "extremist party". He was a senator for life as a former head of state. At the time, Bagaza was known for his extreme views, including general opposition to any power-sharing agreements with Hutu factions such as the Front for Democracy in Burundi (Front pour la Démocratie au Burundi, FRODEBU). He eventually began to advocate the division of Burundi into a "Tutsiland" and a "Hutuland".

On 18 January 1997, Bagaza was placed under house arrest for gathering weapons for a plot against President Buyoya. Two months later, the house arrest was changed into a prison sentence, though he was quickly released. Bagaza was subsequently involved in the peace talks which were supposed to end the Burundian Civil War. As he and PARENA as a whole tended to be opposed to the implementation of power-sharing deals with the Hutu rebels, the government placed Bagaza under house arrest and banned PARENA from November 2002 to May 2003. In 2005, there were rumours that radical followers of Bagaza were organising a rebel group known as "Justice and Liberity United Front". Tensions abated when PARENA accepted ministerial position in the newly formed coalition government. Bagaza ran as PARENA's candidate for the 2010 presidential election, but withdrew when the Burundian opposition boycotted the elections. He stepped down as head of PARENA in March 2014, and was succeeded by Zénon Nimbona. He remained the main opposition leader in the Burundian Senate, and joined the opposition boycott of the 2015 elections. When major unrest erupted in the country in the period leading up to the 2015 election, Bagaza and the other three still-living ex-presidents called for an international intervention.

Bagaza died in Brussels, Belgium on 4 May 2016 at the age of 69 of natural causes and was buried in Bujumbura on 17 May 2016. He was survived by his wife Fausta and four daughters.

== Notes ==
Political offices
| Preceded by Michel Micombero | President of Burundi; 1976–1987 | Succeeded by Pierre Buyoya |
