= Copyright law of Burundi =

The basic law on copyright in Burundi is Law No. 1/021 of December 30, 2005, on the Protection of Copyright and Related Rights in Burundi. Burundi has not signed the Berne Convention but it has signed the TRIPS Agreement.
