= Commune of Rutovu =

Coordinates: 3°53′S 29°51′E

- Commune
- Interactive map of Commune of Rutovu
- Country: Burundi
- Province: Bururi Province
- Administrative center: Rutovu
- Time zone: UTC+2 (Central Africa Time)

The commune of Rutovu is a commune of Bururi Province in south-western Burundi. The capital lies at Rutovu.
