= 1984 Burundian presidential election =

- 31 August 1984
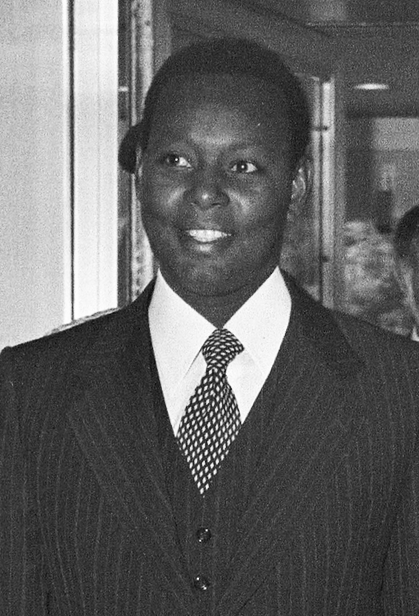
Nominee	Jean-Baptiste Bagaza
Party	UPRONA
Popular vote	1,752,579
Percentage	99.6%
President before election
Jean-Baptiste Bagaza
UPRONA
Elected President
Jean-Baptiste Bagaza
UPRONA

Presidential elections were held for the first time in Burundi on 31 August 1984. Incumbent Jean-Baptiste Bagaza of the Union for National Progress (UPRONA; then the sole legal party) was the only candidate, and was re-elected with 99.63% of the vote. Voter turnout was 98.3%.

Candidate	Party	Votes	%
Jean-Baptiste Bagaza	Union for National Progress	1,752,579	99.6
Against			0.4
Total			
Total votes		1,758,804	–
Registered voters/turnout		1,788,493	98.34
Source: Nohlen et al.
