= Constitution of Burundi =

2005 national constitution

The Constitution of Burundi was adopted by referendum on February 28, 2005 and promulgated on March 18, 2005.

On May 12, 2017, a draft revision of the constitution of Burundi was announced. The final draft was announced on October 25, 2017, and provides for the creation of a post of Prime Minister, the transition from a five-year to a seven year presidential term, the term limit will be one consecutive and the threshold of adoption of the laws would go from two thirds to the absolute majority. With these changes, the Arusha Accords are de facto abrogated. In January 2018, during the campaign for the referendum, the Burundian authorities arrested opponents of the changes. Finally, the text also provides for the possibility of restoring the monarchy.

The referendum was held on May 17, 2018. The proposed amendments to the constitution were approved by over 70% of voters. The constitutional reform was promulgated on June 7, 2018.

== See also ==
- Constitution of the Kingdom of Burundi
