= Pierre Buyoya =

President of Burundi (1987–1993; 1996–2003)

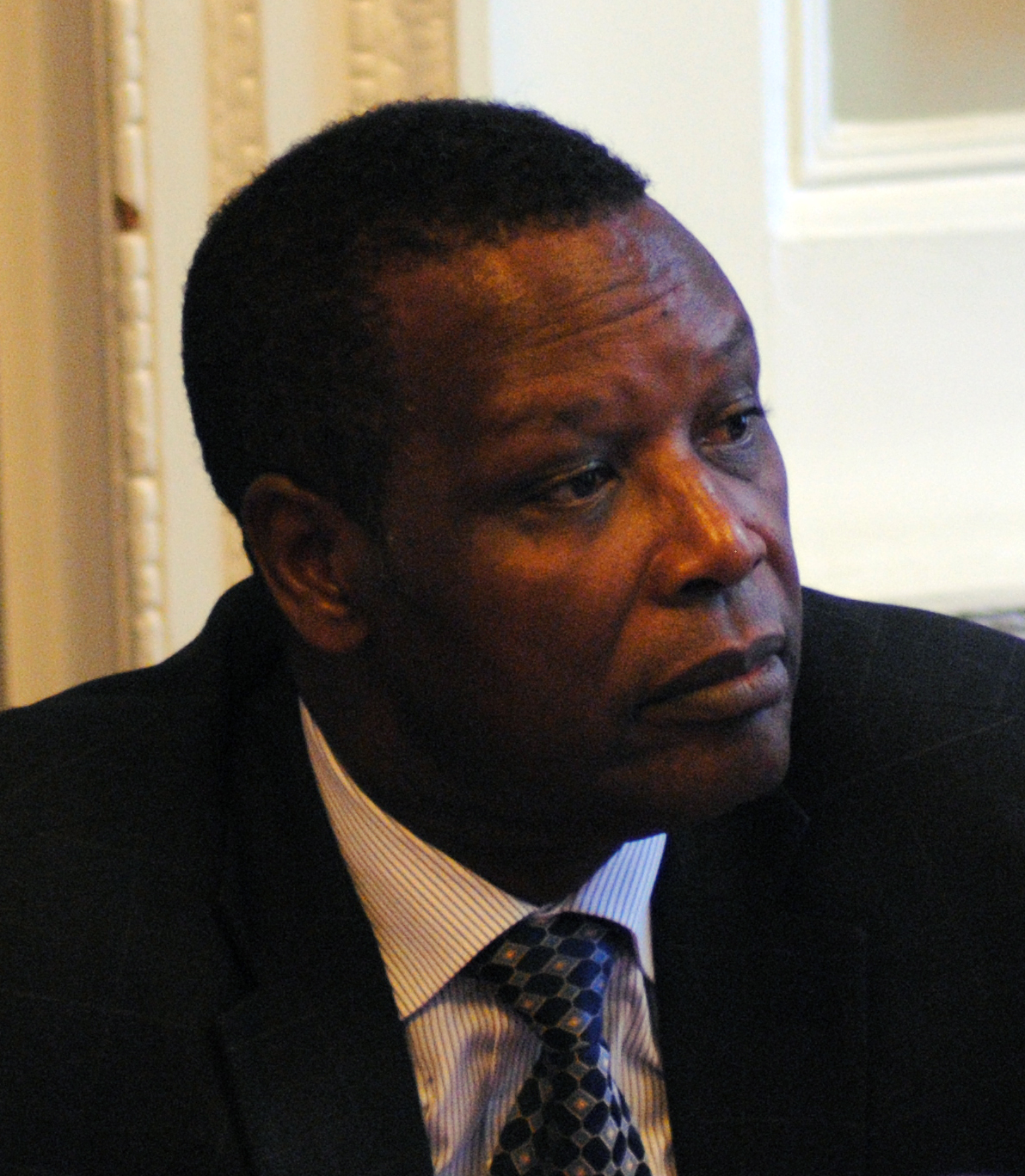
- Buyoya in 2013

3rd and 7th President of Burundi
- In office 25 July 1996 – 30 April 2003^{[a]}
- Prime Minister: Pascal-Firmin Ndimira (1996–1998)
- Vice President: Frédéric Bamvuginyumvira (1998–2001); Mathias Sinamenye (1998–2001); Domitien Ndayizeye (2001–2003)
- Preceded by: Sylvestre Ntibantunganya
- Succeeded by: Domitien Ndayizeye
- In office 3 September 1987 – 10 July 1993
- Prime Minister: Adrien Sibomana
- Preceded by: Jean-Baptiste Bagaza
- Succeeded by: Melchior Ndadaye

Senator for life
- In office 30 April 2003 – 7 June 2018

Personal details
- Born: 24 November 1949 Rutovu, Ruanda-Urundi (modern-day Burundi)
- Died: 17 December 2020 (aged 71) Bonneuil-en-France, France
- Resting place: Bamako (2020–2024); Rutovu (2024–present)
- Party: UPRONA
- Spouse: Sophie Ntaraka (m. 1978)
- Children: 4
- Education: Royal Military Academy

Military service
- Allegiance: Burundi
- Branch/service: Burundi Armed Forces
- Rank: Major
- a. Acting: 25 July 1996 – 11 June 1998

Pierre Buyoya (24 November 1949 – 17 December 2020) was a Burundian army officer and politician who served as the seventh president of Burundi from 1996 to 2003. Having previously served as the fifth president from 1987 to 1993, Buyoya was the second-longest-serving president in Burundian history, after Pierre Nkurunziza.

An ethnic Tutsi, Buyoya joined the sole legal party, UPRONA and quickly rose through the ranks of the Burundian military. In 1987, he led a military coup d'état that overthrew his predecessor Jean-Baptiste Bagaza and enabled him to seize power. Leading an oppressive military junta, Hutu uprisings in 1988 led to the killings of an estimated 20,000 people. Buyoya then established a National Reconciliation Commission that created a new constitution in 1992 which allowed for a multi-party system and a non-ethnic government. Running as a candidate in the 1993 Burundian presidential election, he was defeated by Hutu candidate Melchior Ndadaye of the FRODEBU opposition party.

Ndadaye was assassinated during another attempted coup after only three months in office, leading to a series of retaliatory killings that culminated in the Burundian Civil War. During the war, Buyoya returned to power in another coup d'état in 1996. During his second presidency, he created an ethnically inclusive government by establishing a partnership with FROBEDU. This led to the 2000 Arusha Accords which introduced ethnic power sharing. He selected Domitien Ndayizeye, a Hutu as his vice-president, who succeeded him as president in 2003. The war ended two years later.

Following the end of the war, Buyoya became a senator for life under the terms of the 2004 constitution. During his post-presidency, he was also sent as an African Union envoy during peace missions in Chad and Mali. In October 2020, he was sentenced to life in prison in absentia by a Burundinan court for his suspected role in the 1993 coup attempt that assassinated Ndadaye. He died of COVID-19 two months later.

== Early life ==
Pierre Buyoya was born in Rutovu, Bururi Province, on 24 November 1949 in Belgian-administered Ruanda-Urundi. His father, Rurikumunwa, was ethnically a Tutsi-Hima of the Batyaba clan. The name "Buyoya" was not the family's surname, but instead can be translated as "baby". Buyoya later recollected that his parents had lost several other children and feared that he too might die young, thus initially picking the name "baby" for their son and deciding that they could later change the name. This decision was not unusual, as children have traditionally often received descriptive or protective names per Burundian naming customs. Despite his parents' initial intention, Buyoya's name was never updated.

He received a primary education at a Catholic mission in Rutovu from 1958 to 1963. He thereafter attended the Ecole moyenne pédagogique until 1967. He enlisted as an officer the Burundian Army and studied at the Royal Military Academy in Brussels, Belgium, rising to the rank of major. Academically, Buyoya studied social sciences, examined armoured cavalry, and defended a thesis concerning the Algerian National Liberation Front. Once done with his studies in Belgium, he attended the General Staff College in France from August 1976 to January 1977 and the Bundeswehr Command and Staff College in West Germany from 1980 to 1982.

Buyoya married Sophie Ntaraka in 1978, and the couple had four children. He entered the long-term single party, Union for National Progress (Union pour le Progrès national, UPRONA), and acquired a position on its Central Committee (Comité central) in 1979. He renewed his party membership in 1984. Buyoya joined the General Staff of the Army in 1982 and was made responsible for training. His rapid rise through the military hierarchy earned him the nickname "Old Man", and he was well-respected by his fellow soldiers. The New York Times reported in 1996 that "[n]o one could recall his ever telling a joke. He is often seen at soccer games and reads a lot. He eschews a uniform, though his leisure suits recall French summer khakis."

== Presidency ==
=== Coup d'état and first term, 1987–1993 ===
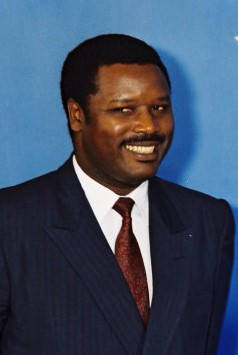
Buyoya in 1990

In September 1987, Buyoya led a military coup d'état against the regime of Jean-Baptiste Bagaza who had taken power in another coup in November 1976. Buyoya's coup was reportedly organized by non-commissioned officers who had disapproved of Bagaza's plan to limit army service to ten years and to end the soldiers' right to free electricity for living spaces outside barracks. Buyoya led the country as the chairman of a 31-person military committee of national safety. He proclaimed an agenda of economic liberalisation. As in previous regimes, he presided over an oppressive ruling junta consisting primarily of Tutsi. Initially, there were few policy changes compared to Bagaza's regime, with a notable exception being Buyoya's effort to improve relations with the Christian churches by ending the government's anti-clerical campaign.

As Buyoya's government implemented few changes, resentment grew among the marginalized Hutu, fueled by the radical PALIPEHUTU party and militant group as well as the hostile government of neighboring Rwanda. Tensions eventually escalated in the communes of Ntega and Marangara, where a Hutu uprising erupted in August 1988. The rebels initially killed about 300 Tutsi, whereupon the Burundian army brutally retaliated and killed approximately 20,000 Hutu. Buyoya refused to properly investigate the mass killings, but he recognized his government's weakness in the face of popular discontent as well as international condemnations over the massacres. He thus began to implement reforms.

Buyoya appointed a Commission of National Reconciliation (Commission pour la réconciliation nationale), and he was officially proclaimed President of Burundi on 9 September 1988. In early October he appointed a mixed government of both civilian and military figures and awarded himself the post of Minister of National Defence. He chose Adrien Sibomana, a well-respected Hutu, as his prime minister, and made efforts to ethnically balance his cabinet. For the first time since the 1960s, substantial public debate was allowed over issues of policy and governance. By 1991, the Commission of National Reconciliation had created a "Charter of Unity" (Ubumwe) which was approved via referendum and supposed to reduce ethnic tensions. These efforts were accompanied by publicity campaigns led Buyoya's government, resulting in the creation of "unity squares" in most towns with small monuments celebrating inter-ethnic unity, while government officials were encouraged to spread slogans to garner support for the unity measures. According to researcher Nigel Watt, "this unity was cosmetic" and did not change the real power dynamics in the country, though Buyoya's regime was possibly "starting to do the right thing". Tutsi and Hutu extremists opposed even these small changes, with two small Hutu revolts taking place in 1991 and again resulting in brutal punitative campaigns by the Tutsi-dominated military.

The Commission of National Reconciliation created a new constitution that Buyoya approved in 1992. This constitution called for a non-ethnic government with a president and a parliament. Described as a "cunning politician" by Watt, Buyoya subsequently managed to maintain power while making mostly ceremonial efforts regarding democratization. However, his limited liberalism allowed for the emergence of a "visible Hutu bourgeoisie" as well as freer party politics. Democratic presidential elections were held in June 1993 and were won by the Hutu Melchior Ndadaye, who created a balanced Hutu and Tutsi government. Nevertheless, the army assassinated Ndadaye in a coup attempt in October 1993. Some human rights groups suspected Buyoya of supporting the putschists, while several soldiers who participated accused him of helping plan the coup. Burundi entered a prolonged period of civil war in which 300,000 people were killed and 470,000 displaced. There were numerous attempts to form a government, but even the coalition government under Sylvestre Ntibantunganya was unable to stop the fighting.

=== Coup d'état and second term, 1996–2003 ===
On 25 July 1996, with strong support and backup from the army, Buyoya returned to power in a military coup, ousting interim President Ntibantunganya who had been contested by the population due to his failure to stop killings perpetrated by rebels. The civil war became less intense but continued. Economic sanctions were also imposed by the international community because of the nature of Buyoya's return to power, but were eased as Buyoya created an ethnically inclusive government. He entered a new "partnership" with the National Assembly in June 1998 which was dominated by the Hutu-backed Front for Democracy in Burundi (Front pour la Démocratie au Burundi, FRODEBU). This paved the way for the Arusha Accords in 2000 which introduced a form of ethnic power-sharing and paved the way for the end of the Civil War. Buyoya selected as his vice-president Domitien Ndayizeye, a Hutu. The conditions of the Arusha Accords required Buyoya to hand over power in 2003, which he did. Ndayizeye became the President of Burundi on 30 April, paving the way for the end of the Civil War in 2005.

== Later activities ==
In the aftermath of the Civil War, Buyoya became a senator for life as a former head of state, per the terms of the 2004 constitution.

In his 2007 book From Bloodshed to Hope in Burundi, the former US Ambassador Robert Krueger accuses Buyoya of orchestrating the 1993 putsch that led to the murder of President Ndadaye.

Buyoya was appointed by the African Union to lead a peace mission in Chad in 2008. He was subsequently appointed to another mission in Mali. On 19 October 2020 the Supreme Court of Burundi sentenced Buyoya in absentia to life in prison for the murder of Ndadaye in 1993.

In December 2020 he contracted COVID-19 in Mali during the COVID-19 pandemic in Mali. At first, he was hospitalised in Bamako but was later transferred to France and died on 17 December in Bonneuil-en-France, in an ambulance on his way to a hospital in Paris. He was buried in Bamako on 29 December 2020. On 16 July 2024, at the private initiative of his family and with the agreement of the President of Burundi Évariste Ndayishimiye, Buyoya's remains were repatriated to Burundi and buried in a private ceremony in Rutovu.

== Works cited ==
- Akyeampong, Emmanuel Kwaku; Gates, Henry Louis, eds. (2012). Dictionary of African Biography. Vol. 2. Oxford University Press USA. ISBN 978-0-19-538207-5.
- Daley, Patricia O. (2008). Gender & Genocide in Burundi: The Search for Spaces of Peace in the Great Lakes Region. African Issues. Bloomington: Indiana University Press. ISBN 978-0-253-35171-5.
- Watt, Nigel (2016) [1st pub. 2008]. Burundi: Biography of a Small African Country (Revised and updated ed.). London: C. Hurst & Co. ISBN 978-1849045094.

Political offices
Preceded by Jean-Baptiste Bagaza	President of Burundi; 1987–1993	Succeeded by Melchior Ndadaye
Preceded by Sylvestre Ntibantunganya	President of Burundi; 1996–2003	Succeeded by Domitien Ndayizeye
