= Banyaruguru =

Ethnic group

The Banyaruguru are a closely related ethnic group (sometimes considered a subgroup) to the Batutsi, Banyankole, Bahima, Bahororo, Ha people living in western Tanzania, and Banyamulenge living in northern Rwanda and parts of Uganda. They live in Uganda, They are found in Kitagwenda, Kamwenge district in Tooro kingdom, while others are located on the Ankole hills in Rubirizi district.

== History ==
The Banyaruguru originated from the Baganda. A fight broke out between two kabakas of Buganda which led to the death of one king and the existence of the Banyaruguru people. In 1797, Buganda's reigning king Junju Sendegeya fought with his brother Semakiikiro Wasajja Nabbunga leading to his death.

== Culture ==
The Banyaruguru people are mainly fishermen and also practice other economics activities like agriculture and stone quarrying.

== See also ==
- Bunyaruguru
