= Michel Micombero =

First president of Burundi (1966–1976)

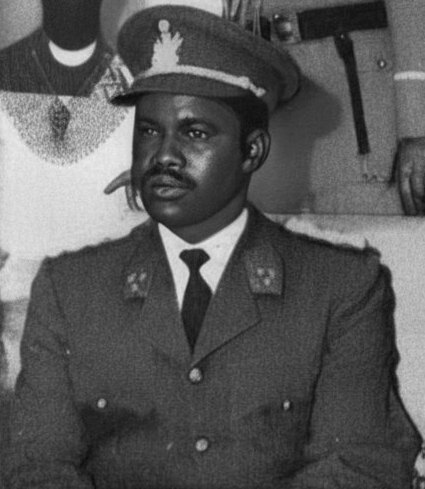
- Micombero in 1966

1st President of Burundi
- In office 28 November 1966 – 1 November 1976
- Prime Minister: Albin Nyamoya (1972‍–‍1973)
- Preceded by: Ntare V (as king)
- Succeeded by: Jean-Baptiste Bagaza

8th Prime Minister of Burundi
- In office 11 July 1966 – 28 November 1966
- Monarch: Ntare V
- Preceded by: Léopold Biha
- Succeeded by: Position abolished

Personal details
- Born: 26 August 1940 Rutovu, Ruanda-Urundi (modern-day Burundi)
- Died: 16 July 1983 (aged 42) (Note: According to the obituary published in The New York Times two days later, Micombero died on 16 July 1983. His entry in the Dictionary of African Biography gives 6 August 1983 instead.) Mogadishu, Somalia
- Party: Union for National Progress (UPRONA)
- Spouse: Adèle Nzeyimana (m. 1965)
- Education: Royal Military Academy; Somali National University

Military service
- Allegiance: Burundi
- Branch/service: Burundi Army
- Years of service: 1962–1976

Michel Micombero (26 August 1940 – 16 July 1983) was a Burundian military officer and politician who ruled the country as de facto military dictator for the decade between 1966 and 1976. He was the last Prime Minister of the Kingdom of Burundi from July to November 1966, and the first President of the country from November 1966 until his overthrow in 1976.

Micombero was an ethnic Tutsi who began his career as an officer in the Burundian military at the time of Burundi's independence in 1962. He studied abroad and was given a ministerial portfolio on his return. He rose to prominence for his role in helping to crush an attempted coup d'état in October 1965 by ethnic Hutu soldiers against the Tutsi-dominated monarchy. In its aftermath, in 1966, Micombero himself instigated two further coups against the monarchy which he perceived as too moderate. The first coup in July installed a new king on the throne, propelling Micombero to the role of prime minister. The second coup in November abolished the monarchy itself, bringing Micombero to power as the first president of the new Republic of Burundi.

Micombero led a one-party state which centralised the country's institutions and adopted a neutral stance in the Cold War. Dissent was repressed and, in 1972, an attempt to challenge Micombero's power led to genocidal violence against the Hutu population in which around 100,000 people, mainly Hutus, were killed. His regime finally collapsed in 1976 when he was ousted in a coup d'état by another army officer, Jean-Baptiste Bagaza, who installed himself as president. Micombero went into exile in Somalia, where he died in 1983.

== Biography ==
=== Early life, 1940–1962 ===
Micombero was born in Rutovu, Bururi Province in Belgian-ruled Ruanda-Urundi on 26 August 1940. His parents were peasants of Hima ethnicity, part of the wider Tutsi ethnic group. Micombero studied at Catholic mission schools in Burundi and, in 1960, joined the military which was being formed ahead of Burundi's planned independence in 1962. As part of his training, he was sent to study at the Royal Military Academy in Brussels, Belgium in April 1960 to train as an officer. In March 1962 he was promoted to the rank of second lieutenant. At the time of the independence of the Kingdom of Burundi in July 1962, he held the rank of captain. In November he was made assistant commander-in-chief of the Burundian National Army (Armée Nationale Burundaise).

=== Independence and seizure of power, 1962–1966 ===
Location of Burundi in Central Africa. By 1966, it was bordered to the north by Rwanda and to the east and west by Tanzania and the Democratic Republic of the Congo respectively.

In early post-independence Burundi, the Tutsi-dominated monarchy of Mwambutsa IV attempted to balance the interests of Tutsi with those of the Hutu majority. In 1963, Micombero joined the ruling Union for National Progress (Union pour le Progrès national, UPRONA) party which, though dominated by Tutsi, also tried to attract Hutu members. In June, Micombero was named State Secretary for Defense (Minister of National Defence), making him head of the military at the age of 23. In September he appealed to the National Assembly to merge the civilian National Gendarmerie (Gendarmerie nationale) into the army to head off "antagonistic" tendencies between the two forces, but this was never carried out.

In October 1965, a group of ethnic Hutus, drawn largely from the National Gendarmerie, attempted to overthrow the Burundian monarchy. Their attempt was unsuccessful but Mwambutsa IV fled into exile. Micombero led the repression against the coup's perpetrators. On 9 November 1965 he married Adèle Nzeyimana, a Ganwa daughter of a subchief. In July 1966, a second coup d'état brought the king's son, Ntare V, to power. On 8 July Ntare declared the dismissal of Prime Minister Léopold Biha and the suspension of the constitution. The following day he asked Micombero to form a government. On 12 July Micombero presented his government to Ntare with himself as Prime Minister and Minister of Defence. Tensions between the soldiers in the government and the monarchy emerged in August and led to a reshuffling of the cabinet in September. On 7 November Ntare attempted to broadcast a decree dismissing Micombero's government, but was turned away from the radio station by soldiers. Three weeks later, on 28 November, while Ntare was in the Democratic Republic of the Congo on a state visit, Micombero, now a colonel, led a military coup d'état that deposed the king. He then abolished the monarchy and proclaimed Burundi a republic with himself as its first President.

=== Dictatorship, 1966–1976 ===
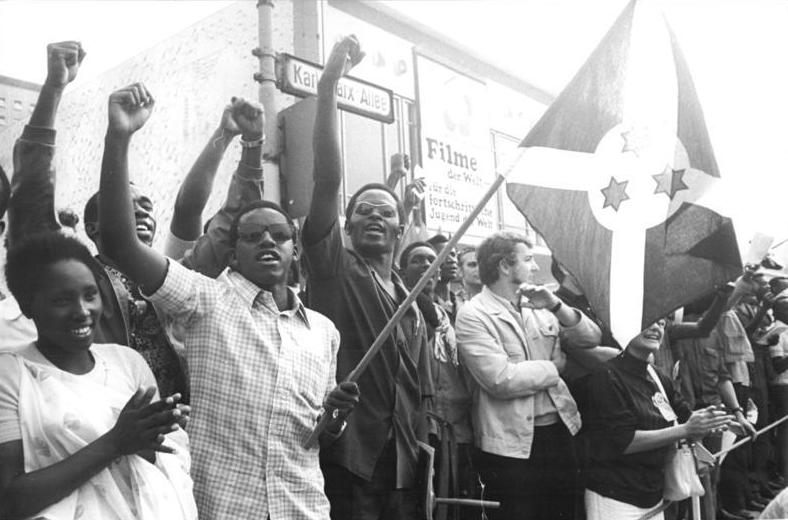
Burundian delegates at the Soviet-sponsored 1973 World Festival of Youth and Students in East Germany. Micombero managed to navigate between communist and capitalist powers during the Cold War.

As president, Micombero declared Burundi a one-party state with UPRONA as the only legal party. He abolished the parliament and instead set up a "National Revolutionary Council". His ideology of "democratic centralism" brought all the country's institutions and media under the control of what was effectively a military dictatorship. His regime combined ideas from the socialist ideology of Tanzania with other doctrines from Joseph-Désiré Mobutu's regime in the Democratic Republic of the Congo (known as Zaire from 1971 to 1997). Micombero's regime systematically marginalized Hutus; for instance, he excluded Hutus from the national military by introducing new height and girth standards that were usually only fulfilled by Tutsi recruits.

Micombero became increasingly paranoid after suffering an injury in a road accident in 1967. He was widely believed to be an alcoholic, and often seen in a "drunken stupor". Various plots against the regime were discovered and unrest remained; notable attempts at deposing him were prevented in 1969 and 1971. His base of support became increasingly restricted to Tutsi in the northern and central regions of Burundi. For instance, Tutsis from Muramvya led the 1971 plot against his rule. As a Cold War leader, he was able to play off both Communist and Western powers against one another. In 1969, he accused Belgium of having supported a minor Hutu revolt, causing the latter to withdraw military aid. The Belgians were quickly replaced by the French.

In April 1972, a rebellion broke out among the Hutu at Rumonge in the south at the encouragement of the Tanzanian regime and spread rapidly. In subsequent ethnic violence, as many as 1,000 Tutsi were killed. The response of the Micombero regime was to launch a campaign of genocidal violence against the Hutu in the region in which at least 100,000 people are thought to have been killed. The deposed king Ntare, said to have led the rebellion, was himself murdered. The massacres particularly targeted educated Hutus. A number of Banyaruguru Tutsis were also murdered. Realizing that the violence was out of control, Micombero eventually ordered the massacres to cease. In 1973, after further violence, Mobutu was forced to intervene to prevent a Tanzanian invasion. Following the end of the crisis, Micombero introduced a new constitution allowing him to run for a further seven-year term. He also laid the foundation for the Economic Community of the Great Lakes Countries the same year, along with the governments of Rwanda and Zaire.

In November 1976 opponents, led by Colonel Jean-Baptiste Bagaza, led a successful coup d'état against Micombero's regime. Micombero himself was arrested and a second republic was declared under the dictatorship of Bagaza. Although a Tutsi and a participant in the killings of 1972, Bagaza made concessions to the Hutu majority and made some progress towards modernising the Burundian state until he too was deposed in 1987.

=== Exile and death, 1977–1983 ===
Micombero was exiled from Burundi in 1977. He took up residence in Somalia, then ruled by dictator Siad Barre who was a close friend. He gained a degree in economics from the Somali National University in 1982. He died of a heart attack at Madina Hospital in Mogadishu in 1983.

Researcher Nigel Watt assessed Micombero as the "first, and worst, of the three Tutsi military presidents" of Burundi, as, by unleashing the 1972 violence, he caused lasting hatred and violence that plagued Burundi for decades.

== See also ==
- Ikiza

Political offices
| Preceded by Léopold Biha | Prime Minister of Burundi; 1966 | Succeeded by Position abolished |
| Preceded by Ntare V Ndizeye (As king) | President of Burundi; 1966–1976 | Succeeded by Jean-Baptiste Bagaza |
