= 2018 Burundian constitutional referendum =

- 17 May 2018
- To reintroduce the post of Prime Minister, reduce the number of Vice-Presidents from two to one, and increase the presidential term from five to seven years, but restricting a president to two consecutive terms

Results
Choice	Votes	%
Yes	3,359,493	79.08%
No	888,564	20.92%
Valid votes	4,248,057	92.62%
Invalid or blank votes	338,673	7.38%
Total votes	4,586,730	100.00%
Registered voters/turnout	4,768,154	96.2%

A constitutional referendum was held in Burundi on 17 May 2018. The proposed amendments to the constitution were approved by over 70% of voters.

== Proposed changes ==
The proposed changes would reintroduce the post of Prime Minister and reduce the number of Vice-President from two to one. They also involve increasing the presidential term from five to seven years, but restricting a president to two consecutive terms. However, the amendments would also allow incumbent President Pierre Nkurunziza, in office since 2005, to stand for re-election, despite having already served three terms.

The amendments also reduce the parliamentary majority required to pass legislation.

== Conduct ==
In December 2017, Nkurunziza threatened people not to campaign against the proposed changes. The official campaign window opened two weeks before the referendum.

Prior to the referendum, the BBC and Voice of America were banned from the country for six months. Radio France Internationale (RFI) received a "warning" about its coverage.

On 11 May, at least 26 people were killed in Cibitoke Province, allegedly by militiamen from the Democratic Republic of the Congo.

The Burundian opposition coalition, Conseil National pour le Respect de l'Accord d'Arusha pour la paix et la Réconciliation au Burundi et la Restauration de l'Etat de Droit (CNARED) called on the Burundian population to boycott the vote which it accused of being the "death warrant" of the Arusha Accords of 2000 which ended the Burundian Civil War. A Presidential decree threatened three years' imprisonment for anyone convicted of encouraging people not to vote.

Reports from polling stations say some people were being forced to vote to avoid being beaten or arrested. Suspected opponents were "killed, raped, abducted, beaten, and intimidated," Human Rights Watch said in a statement, adding it had documented at least 15 killings, six rapes and eight abductions during voting day.

== Results ==
Choice	Votes	%
For	3,359,493	79.08
Against	888,564	20.92
Total	4,248,057	100.00
Valid votes	4,248,057	92.62
Invalid/blank votes	338,673	7.38
Total votes	4,586,730	100.00
Registered voters/turnout	4,768,154	96.20
Source: CENI
