= Rutovu =

- Town
- Location in Burundi
- Coordinates: 3°53′28″S 29°51′7″E
- Country: Burundi
- Province: Bururi Province
- Commune: Commune of Rutovu
- Time zone: UTC+2 (Central Africa Time)

Rutovu is a small town and seat of the Commune of Rutovu in Bururi Province in southern Burundi. It lies 37.1 kilometres by road to the northeast of Bururi.

== People ==
The first three presidents of Burundi were born in Rutovu.

== Tourism ==
Rutovu receives some tourism due to nearby Mount Kikizi, known as the most distant source of the White Nile.
