= Union for National Progress =

Political party in Burundi

Union for National Progress Union pour le Progrès national
- President: Gaston Sindimwo
- Founder: Louis Rwagasore
- Founded: January 1960; 66 years ago
- Ideology: Burundian nationalism Tutsi interests Civic nationalism Economic interventionism Historical: Under François Ngeze: Pacifism Pro-Louis Rwagasore views Pro-Pierre Ngendandumwe views Under Pierre Buyoya: Economic liberalization Pro-Market economy Under Jean-Baptiste Bagaza: Economic statism Mixed economy Anti-ethnicism Pro-small-scale capitalist agriculture Pro-German model Authoritarianism Under Michel Micombero: Democratic centralism Ujamma Mobutism African socialism Republicanism Under Louis Rwagasore: Anti-colonialism Constitutional monarchy
- Political position: Centre-left; Historical: Syncretic
- Colors: Red and white
- Anthem: "UPRONA Ni wewe duhanze Amaso"
- Senate: 0 / 13
- National Assembly: 0 / 111

Party flag

The Union for National Progress (French: Union pour le Progrès national, UPRONA) is a nationalist political party in Burundi. Initially it emerged as a nationalist united front in opposition to Belgian colonial rule but subsequently became an integral part of the one-party state established by Michel Micombero after 1966. Dominated by members of the Tutsi ethnic group and increasingly intolerant to their Hutu counterparts, UPRONA remained the dominant force in Burundian politics until the latter stages of the Burundian Civil War in 2003. It is currently a minor opposition party.

== History ==
Sources differ on the circumstances of UPRONA's founding. According to political scientist Warren Weinstein, UPRONA was created shortly after a 1958 meeting of customary chiefs and clergy convened by Burundian prince Louis Rwagasore and Léopold Biha to discuss nationalist ideas. According to Biha, UPRONA was created in 1957 to protest a Belgian administrative reorganisation that disempowered the monarchy. According to linguist Ellen K. Eggers, UPRONA was formed in the late 1950s and Rwagasore became heavily involved with it in 1958. Historian Ludo De Witte wrote that Rwagasore and some associates organised the first UPRONA meetings in September and October 1958. According to Governor Jean-Paul Harroy, Rwagasore founded the party in late 1959. It received official recognition from the colonial administration as a political party on 7 January 1960.

Rwagasore took virtual control over the movement, though his familial connection to the Mwami disqualified him from holding any party offices and he officially served UPRONA only as an advisor. UPRONA was able to secure the early financial support of the Swahili population in Bujumbura and Lake Tanganyika coastline. The party initially was strongly identified with the interests of the Bezi lineage of Ganwa and support for traditional institutions, but this alignment fell apart after Rwagasore came into conflict with his father. Under Rwagasore, UPRONA pushed a program of modernisation, committing neither to a return to the feudal system nor a complete societal transformation. He used symbols of the monarchy to communicate his message and often emphasised his princely status at public appearances, but he stressed that UPRONA would support the monarchy "only insofar as this regime and its dynasty favoured the genuine emancipation of the Murundi people".

Rwagasore sought to transform UPRONA into a mass party with broad-base appeal across different regions, ethnicities, and castes. Wary of the growing Hutu–Tutsi ethnic conflict in Ruanda, he sought to counteract tensions by bringing members of both groups into UPRONA's leadership. Formal party positions at both the national and local levels were usually evenly divided between Hutus and Tutsis, though the latter tended to occupy the most important offices. The party enjoyed some cohesive success in Usumbura, but never truly cultivated a mass political base, especially outside the capital. UPRONA's internal rules set devolved responsibilities to the central committee, but in practice the party operated at the whim of Rwagasore; it retained relatively weak organisational capability and was held together by his charismatic leadership. His populist tendencies and personal popularity led many of the original chiefs who had supported UPRONA, including founding member Biha, to leave the party and engage in their own political activities. In their place, the party relied upon the support of seminary graduates, évolués, and younger chiefs.

Shortly before Burundi's first municipal elections in 1960, the Belgian administration—fearful of communist sympathies in UPRONA—placed Rwagasore under house arrest and forced many other party figures into exile. UPRONA declared a boycott of the elections which, UPRONA's rivals, specifically the Christian Democratic Party (Parti Démocratique Chrétien, PDC), performed well in, with Belgian support. Of the 2,876 offices available, UPRONA won 545, while the PDC won 942. UPRONA was not represented in the national transitional government established by the colonial administration in January 1961.

For the 1961 legislative elections, UPRONA concentrated its entire election campaign on Rwagasore, using his charisma to rally substantial support. Burundi hosted legislative elections on 18 September 1961. With approximately 80% voter turnout, UPRONA won 58 of 64 seats in the Legislative Assembly, and Rwagasore was declared formateur. Ten days later the Legislative Assembly installed a 10-member government with Rwagasore as prime minister. He was assassinated in October in a plot conceived by PDC figures, who were subsequently arrested and executed. The murder fractured UPRONA, as Rwagasore's former lieutenants struggled to succeed him as the party's leader.

Conflict embroiled UPRONA over who would assume the party presidency, with André Muhirwa—the new prime minister—seeking it with the support of a Tutsi faction and Paul Mirerekano aiming to secure it with the backing of a Hutu faction. Muhirwa's group would be dubbed the Casablanca faction, while Mirerekano's group would become known as the Monrovia faction. The party increasingly split along ethnic lines. The assumption of numerous UPRONA figures into official government roles also decimated the independent structure of the organisation. In the county's 1965 elections, most UPRONA candidates faced opposition from others bearing the UPRONA label; in some constituencies, there as many as five competing slates of candidates with the same affiliation. In practice, there were two main factions: populaire or pro-Hutu and traditionaliste or pro Tutsi. Ultimately, UPRONA-aligned candidates won 21 of the 33 seats in the National Assembly.

UPRONA's most famous Prime Minister and Burundian National Hero is Louis Rwagasore (assassinated in 1961). Upon the death of Rwagasore, UPRONA developed two factions which became known as the "Casablanca group" and the "Monrovia group". The former was dominated by Tutsis and anti-Western in its ideological orientation. The latter was led by Hutus and leaned either pro-West or was neutral towards it. Ngendandumwe was associated with the Monrovia group. From that time until 1965, the party also had some Hutu support, and three of its Hutu members, including Pierre Ngendandumwe, became Prime Minister of Burundi. The party was taken over by President Michel Micombero in a coup d'état and became a pillar of the military dictatorships that ruled the country from 1966 to 1993. In 1993, UPRONA placed second in contested elections to Melchior Ndadaye's FRODEBU.

UPRONA President Pierre Buyoya handed over power to Hutu leader Domitien Ndayizeye of the Front for Democracy in Burundi (a Hutu-based party) on 30 April 2003. At the legislative elections in 2005, the party won 7.2% and 15 out of 118 seats.

During the 2010 elections, UPRONA boycotted councillors' and presidential elections but decided to participate in the legislative elections claiming the need to form an opposition bloc in Parliament and to better compete in the 2015 elections.

== Electoral history ==
=== Presidential elections ===
Election	Party candidate	Votes	%	Result
1984	Jean-Baptiste Bagaza	1,752,579	99.6%	Elected ✓
1993	Pierre Buyoya	742,360	32.86%	Lost ✗
2015	Gerard Nduwayo	60,380	2.14%	Lost ✗
2020	Gaston Sindimwo	73,353	1.70%	Lost ✗

=== National Assembly elections ===
Election	Votes	%	Seats	+/–	Position
1961	627,453	81.23%	58 / 64	▲58	▲1st
1965			21 / 33	▼37	1st
1982			52 / 65	▲31	1st
1993	461,691	21.87%	16 / 81	▼36	▼2nd
2005	174,575	7.21%	15 / 118	▲15	▼3rd
2010	251,759	11.06%	17 / 106	▲2	▲2nd
2015	71,189	2.49%	2 / 121	▼15	▼3rd
2020	108,865	2.54%	2 / 123	Steady	3rd

=== Senate elections ===
Election	Seats	+/–	Position
2005	2 / 49	▲2	▲4th
2010	2 / 41	Steady	▲2nd
2015	2 / 43	Steady	2nd
2020	1 / 43	▼1	2nd

== Works cited ==
- Banshimiyubusa, Denis (2018). Les enjeux et défis de la démocratisation au Burundi. Essai d'analyse et d'interprétation à partir des partis politiques [The issues and challenges of democratization in Burundi. Essay of analysis and interpretation from political parties] (PDF) (PhD thesis) (in French). Université Pau et des Pays de l'Adour. OCLC 1085890695.
- De Witte, Ludo (2021). Meurtre Au Burundi : La Belgique et l'assassinat de Rwagasore [Murder in Burundi: Belgium and the assassination of Rwagasore] (in French). Editions IWACU, Investig' Action. ISBN 978-2-930827-87-2.
- Eggers, Ellen K. (2006). Historical Dictionary of Burundi (third ed.). Lanham: Scarecrow Press. ISBN 978-0-8108-5302-7.
- Ghislain, Jean (1970). La Féodalité au Burundi (PDF) (in French). Brussels: Académie royale des Sciences d’Outre-Mer. OCLC 2115033.
- Harroy, Jean-Paul (1988). "A propos de 'Burundi'" [About 'Burundi'] (PDF). Bulletins des Séances (in French). 34 (4): 607–622.
- Lemarchand, René (1970). Rwanda and Burundi. New York: Praeger Publishers. OCLC 254366212.
- Philipp, Günther (1978). "Burundi". In Franz Nuscheler; Klaus Ziemer (eds.). Die Wahl der Parlamente und anderer Staatsorgane. Band 2: Afrika [The election of parliaments and other state organs. Volume 2: Africa] (in German). Berlin: Walter de Gruyter. pp. 567–604. ISBN 978-3-11-004518-5.
- Russell, Aidan (2019). Politics and Violence in Burundi: The Language of Truth in an Emerging State. Cambridge: Cambridge University Press. ISBN 978-1-108-49934-7.
- Weinstein, Warren (1976). Historical Dictionary of Burundi. Metuchen: Scarecrow Press. ISBN 978-0-8108-0962-8.
