= Council of Ministers (Burundi) =

Government of Burundi

The Council of Ministers of Burundi are the senior level of the executive branch of Burundi and consists of the Prime Minister of Burundi and various Ministers. The 2018 constitution, which enshrines ethnically based power-sharing, requires that at most 60% of ministers come from the ethnic Hutu majority and at most 40% hail from the Tutsi minority. At least 30% of government ministers must be women. The members of the council are directly appointed by the President in consultation with the Vice-President and Prime minister.

The current council of ministers commenced on 8 September 2024 and is President Évariste Ndayishimiye's second cabinet (with a couple of minister changed of the course of 2024).

== Current members of the government ==
President Évariste Ndayishimiye's first council was a total of 15 ministers of which 5 were women.

28 June 2020 - 8 September 2022
Office	Incumbent	Party	Ethnic Group
President; Commander-in-chief of the Armed Forces	Évariste Ndayishimiye	CNDD-FDD	Hutu
Vice-President of Burundi	Prosper Bazombanza	UPRONA	Tutsi
Prime Minister of Burundi	Alain Guillaume Bunyoni	CNDD-FDD	Hutu
Minister of the Interior, Community Development and Public Security	Gervais Ndirakobuca		
Minister of National Defense and Veteran Affairs	Alain Tribert Mutabazi		
Minister of Justice and Keeper of the Government Seals	Jeanine Nibizi		
Minister of Foreign Affairs & International Development	Albert Shingiro		
Minister of Finance, Budget and Economic Planning	Dr. Domitien Ndihokubwayo	CNDD-FDD	Tutsi
Minister of Education and Scientific Research	Dr. Gaspard Banyankimbona		
Minister of Public Health and HIV/Aids fight	Dr. Thaddée Ndikumana		Hutu
Minister of Environment, Agriculture and Livestock	Dr. Déo-Guide Rurema		
Minister of Infrastructure, Equipment and Social Housing	Déogratias Nsanganiyumwami		
Minister of Public services, Labour & Employment	Domine Banyankimbona		
Minister of Water, Energy and Minerals	Ibrahim Uwizeye	CNDD-FDD	Tutsi
Minister of Commerce, Transport, Industry and Tourism	Immaculate Ndabaneze		
Minister of East African Community Affairs, Youth, Sports and Culture	Ezéchiel Nibigira		
Minister of National Solidarity, Social Affairs, Human Rights and Gender	Imelde Sabushimike		Twa
Minister of Communication, Information Technology and Media	Marie Chantal Nijimbere		

This cabinet was changed after the former Prime minister, Alain Guillaume Bunyoni was sacked in September 2022. After a couple of cabinet reshuffling, the following cabinet was headed by Prime Minister Gervais Ndirakobuca and was made up of the following 15 ministers:

10 December 2024 - 05 August 2025
Office	Incumbent	Party	Ethnic Group
President; Commander-in-chief of the Armed Forces	Évariste Ndayishimiye	CNDD-FDD	Hutu
Vice-President of Burundi	Prosper Bazombanza	UPRONA	Tutsi
Prime Minister of Burundi	Gervais Ndirakobuca	CNDD-FDD	Hutu
Minister of the Interior, Community Development and Public Security	Martin Niteretse		
Minister of National Defence and Veteran Affairs	Eng. Alain Tribert Mutabazi		
Minister of Justice and Keeper of the Government Seals	Domine Banyankimbona		
Minister of Foreign Affairs & International Development	Amb. Albert Shingiro		
Minister of Finance, Budget and Economic Planning	Hon. Nestor Ntahontuye		
Minister of National Education and Scientific Research	Dr. François Havyarimana		
Minister of Public Health and HIV/Aids fight	Dr. Lydwine Baradahana		
Minister of Environment, Agriculture and Livestock	Prosper Dodiko		
Minister of Infrastructure, Equipment and Social Housing	Dieudonné Dukundane		
Minister of Public services, Labour & Employment	Venuste Muyabaga		
Minister of Water, Energy and Minerals	Eng. Ibrahim Uwizeye	CNDD-FDD	Tutsi
Minister of Commerce, Transport, Industry and Tourism	Marie Chantal Nijimbere		
Minister of East African Community Affairs, Youth, Sports and Culture	Amb. Gervais Abayeho		
Minister of National Solidarity, Social Affairs, Human Rights and Gender	Imelde Sabushimike		Twa
Minister of Communication, Information Technology and Media	Léocadie Ndacayisaba		

This cabinet was changed after the former Prime minister, Gervais Ndirakobuca, was elected president of the Senate following the 2025 Parliamentary elections.The current cabinet is headed by Prime Minister Nestor Ntahontuye who was Minister of Finance, Budget and Economic Planning under Prime Minister Gervais Ndirakobuca's cabinet. It is made up of the following 13 ministers:

05 August 2025 - Present
Office	Incumbent	Party	Ethnic Group
President; Commander-in-chief of the Armed Forces	Évariste Ndayishimiye	CNDD-FDD	Hutu
Vice-President of Burundi	Prosper Bazombanza	UPRONA	Tutsi
Prime Minister of Burundi	Nestor Ntahontuye	CNDD-FDD	Hutu
Minister of the Interior, Community Development and Public Security	Hon. Rtd. Maj. Gen. Léonidas Ndaruzaniye		Hutu
Minister of National Defence and Veteran Affairs	Marie Chantal Nijimbere	CNDD-FDD	Tutsi
Minister of Justice, Keeper of the Government Seals, Human Rights and Gender	Alfred Ahingejeje		Twa
Minister of Foreign Affairs & International Development	Amb. Dr.Édouard Bizimana		Hutu
Minister of Finance, Budget and Digital Economy	Dr. Alain Ndikumana		Hutu
Minister of National Education and Scientific Research	Dr. François Havyarimana		Hutu
Minister of Public Health and HIV/Aids fight	Dr. Fidèle Nkezabahizi		
Minister of Environment, Agriculture and Livestock	Calinie Mbarushimana		Hutu
Minister of Infrastructure, Social Housing, Transport and Equipment	Eng. Égide Nijimbere		Hutu
Minister of Public services, Labour & Employment	Police Lt. Gen. Gabriel Nizigama		Hutu
Minister of Mineral Resources, Energy, Industry, Trade and Tourism	Dr. Hassan Kibeya	CNDD-FDD	Hutu
Minister of Youth, Sports and Culture	Lydia Nsekera		Tutsi
Minister of Communication and Media	Evelyne Butoyi		Tutsi

== Members of the Government named in 2010 ==
The president Pierre Nkurunziza named a new government on August 30, 2010. The newly formed government consisted of 21 ministers, out of which 10 were members of the previous government.

Office	Incumbent
Minister of Foreign Affairs	Augustin Nsanze
Ministry of Home Affairs	Edouard Nduwimana
Ministry of Public Security	Alain Guillaume Bunyoni
Minister of Justice and Keeper of the Government Seals	Ancilla Ntakaburimvo
Minister of National Defense and Former Combatants	Maj.Gen. Pontien Gaciyubwenge
Minister at the Presidency in charge of Good Governance, Privatization, General Inspection of the State and Local Administration	Jean Baptiste Gahimbare
Minister of Agriculture and Livestock	Eng. Odette Kayitesi
Minister of Economy, Finance and Development	Clothilde Nizigimana
Minister of Commerce, Industry and Tourism	Victoire Ndikumana
Minister of Environment, Territory Management and Public services	Eng. Jean-Marie Nibirantije
Minister of Education and Scientific Research	Dr. Julien Nimubona
Minister of Youth, Culture and Sports	Jean-Jacques Nyenimigabo
Minister of Public Health and HIV/Aids fight	Dr. Sabine Ntakarutimana
Minister of Information, Communication, Relations with Parliament	Concilie Nibigira
Minister of Civil Services, Labour and social security	Annonciata Sendazirasa
Minister of Transport, Posts and Telecommunications	Ing. Saidi Kibeya
Minister of Water, Energy and Minerals	Moïse Bucumi
Minister of primary and secondary education	Séverin Buzingo
Minister of Communal Development	Pierre Mupira
Minister of National Solidarity, Repatriation, National Building, Human Rights and Gender	Immaculée Nahayo
Minister of Regional Integration and East African Community Affairs	Hafsa Mossi

== Members of the government named in 2007 ==
In 2007 the Government of Burundi consisted of a 20-member Council of Ministers appointed by the President. The Council of Ministers, together with the President and Vice-Presidents, forms the executive branch of government in the country.

Members of President Pierre Nkurunziza's government were announced on 14 November 2007. The government consisted of 12 men (8 Hutus and 4 Tutsis) and 8 women (6 Hutus and 2 Tutsis). The ethnic composition was 14 Hutus and 6 Tutsis. A new government was announced on August 29, 2010.

Office	Incumbent	Political Affiliation
Minister of Foreign Affairs	Antoinette Batumubwira ♀	CNDD-FDD
Minister of Home Affairs and Communal Development	Venant Kamana	CNDD-FDD
Minister of Justice and Keeper of the Government Seals	Jean Bosco Ndikumana	
Minister of National Defense and Former Combatants	Maj.Gen. Germain Niyoyankana	Independent
Minister at the Presidency in charge of Good Governance, Privatization, General Inspection of the State and Local Administration	Martin Nivyabadi	
Minister of Agriculture and Livestock	Eng. Ferdinand Nderagakura	
Minister of Economy, Finance and Development	Clothilde Nizigimana ♀	CNDD-FDD
Minister of Commerce, Industry and Tourism	Euphrasie Bigirimana ♀	
Minister of Environment, Territory Management and Public services	Eng. Anatole Kanyenkiko	UPRONA
Minister of Education and Scientific Research	Saïdi Kibeya	CNDD-FDD
Minister of Youth, Culture and Sports	Jean-Jacques Nyenimigabo	CNDD-FDD
Minister of Public Health and HIV/Aids fight	Dr. Emmanuel Gikoro	
Minister of Information, Communication, Relations with Parliament, and Government Spokesman	Hafsa Mossi ♀	CNDD-FDD
Minister of Civil Services, Labour and social security	Clotilde Niragira ♀	CNDD-FDD
Minister of Transport, Posts and Telecommunications	Philippe Njoni	UPRONA
Minister of Water, Energy and Minerals	Samuel Ndayiragije	
Minister at the Presidency in charge of AIDS	Barnabe Mbonimpa ♀	FRODEBU
Minister of Public Safety	Alain Guillaume Bunyoni ♀	CNDD-FDD
Minister of National Solidarity, Repatriation, National Building, Human Rights and Gender	Immaculée Nahayo ♀	CNDD-FDD
Minister of Regional Integration and East African Community Affairs	Vénérand Bakevyumusaya	

== See also ==
- Burundi
  - Rulers and heads of state of Burundi
  - Heads of government of Burundi
  - Vice-Presidents of Burundi
- Burundi elections, 2005
- History of Burundi
