= Ndayishimiye cabinet =

Inaugural cabinet of president Évariste Ndayishimiye of Burundi in 2020

Ndayishimiye Cabinet
- Cabinet of the Republic of Burundi
- Incumbent
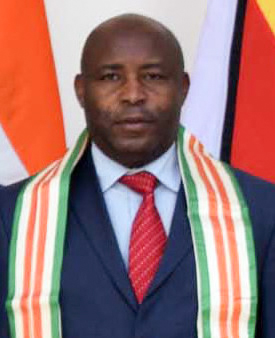
- Date formed: 28 June 2020

People and organisations
- Head of state: Évariste Ndayishimiye
- Head of government: Évariste Ndayishimiye
- No. of ministers: 16
- Member party: CNDD-FDD
- Status in legislature: Majority
- Opposition party: CNL

History
- Election: 2020 general election
- Legislature term: 7 years

The inaugural Ndayishimiye Cabinet was formed by President of Burundi Évariste Ndayishimiye on 28 June 2020. Ndayishimiye took over as president of Burundi in June 2020 following the electoral win in the 2020 Burundian general election and the death of former president Pierre Nkurunziza.

== First Term ==
=== Inaugural Cabinet ===
In his first cabinet, Ndayishimiye nominated 16 Ministers, of which 5 were women.

28 June 2020 - 8 September 2022
Office	Incumbent	Party	Ethnic Group
President; Commander-in-chief of the Armed Forces	Évariste Ndayishimiye	CNDD-FDD	Hutu
Vice-President of Burundi	Prosper Bazombanza	UPRONA	Tutsi
Prime Minister of Burundi	Alain Guillaume Bunyoni	CNDD-FDD	Hutu
Minister of the Interior, Community Development and Public Security	Gervais Ndirakobuca		
Minister of National Defense and Veteran Affairs	Alain Tribert Mutabazi		
Minister of Justice and Keeper of the Government Seals	Jeanine Nibizi		
Minister of Foreign Affairs & International Development	Albert Shingiro		
Minister of Finance, Budget and Economic Planning	Dr. Domitien Ndihokubwayo	CNDD-FDD	Tutsi
Minister of Education and Scientific Research	Dr. Gaspard Banyankimbona		
Minister of Public Health and HIV/Aids fight	Dr. Thaddée Ndikumana		Hutu
Minister of Environment, Agriculture and Livestock	Dr. Déo-Guide Rurema		
Minister of Infrastructure, Equipment and Social Housing	Déogratias Nsanganiyumwami		
Minister of Public services, Labour & Employment	Domine Banyankimbona		
Minister of Water, Energy and Minerals	Ibrahim Uwizeye	CNDD-FDD	Tutsi
Minister of Commerce, Transport, Industry and Tourism	Immaculate Ndabaneze		
Minister of East African Community Affairs, Youth, Sports and Culture	Ezéchiel Nibigira		
Minister of National Solidarity, Social Affairs, Human Rights and Gender	Imelde Sabushimike		Twa
Minister of Communication, Information Technology and Media	Marie Chantal Nijimbere		
