= List of ambassadors of Burundi to Germany =

Coordinates: 52.486648°N 13.321826°E

Ambassador of Burundi to Germany
- Umuserukizi w'Uburundi mu Budagi
- Coat of arms of Burundi

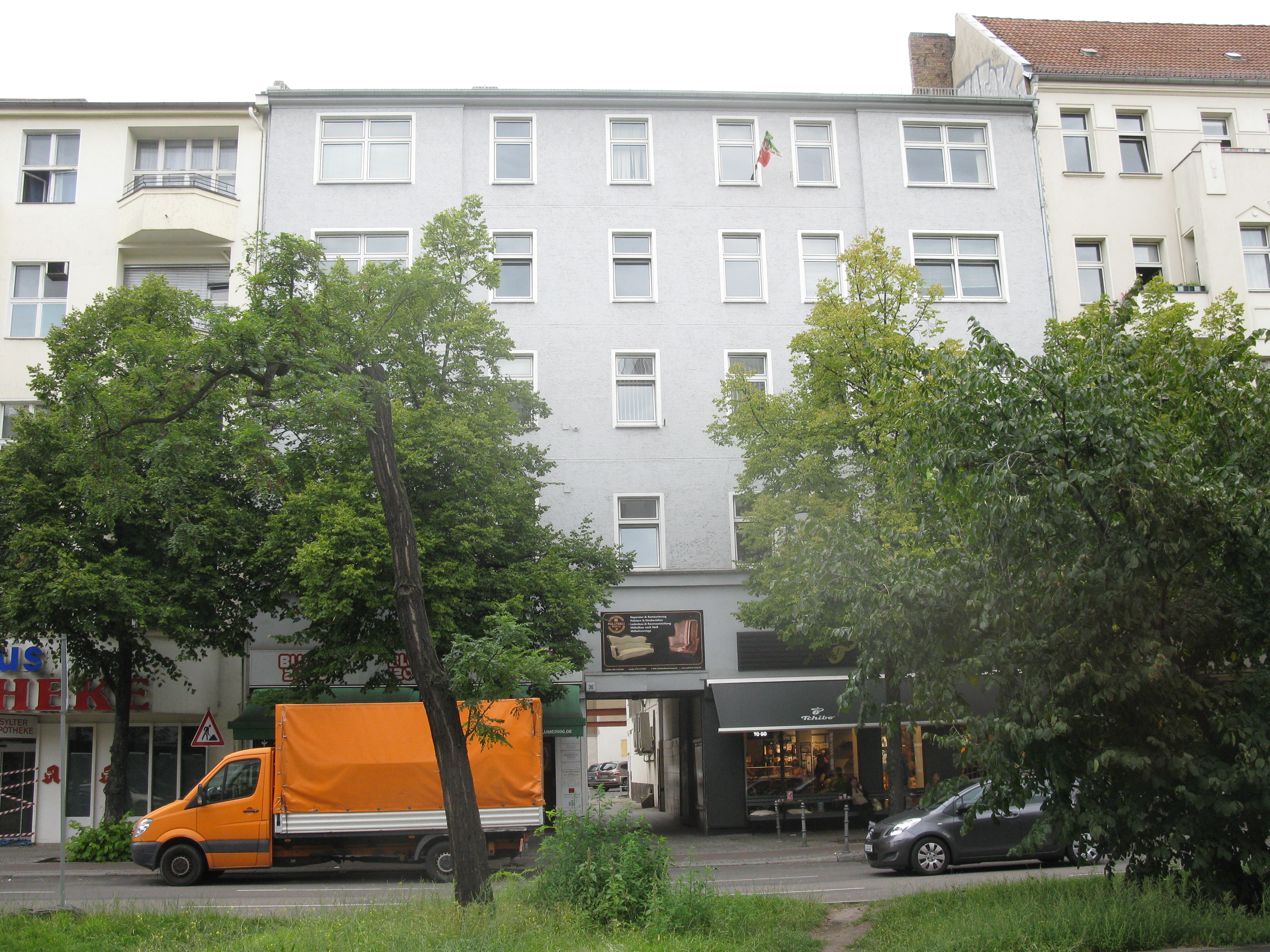
- Incumbent; Annonciata Sendazirasa since February 14, 2024
- Style: His/Her Excellency
- Residence: 10715 Berlin, Berliner Straße 36 (Embassy office)
- Appointer: Évariste Ndayishimiye
- Inaugural holder: Pierre Bigaympunzi
- Formation: 1966
- Website: https://www.ambabuberlin.mae.gov.bi/

The Burundian Ambassador to Germany is the official representative of the Government of Burundi to the Government of Germany.

- The Ambassador, with residence in Berlin, is concurrently accredited to Vienna, to Copenhagen, to Reykjavík, to Prague, to Oslo, to Stockholm, to Riga, to Helsinki and to Bratislava.
- He/She is also concurrently accredited to the following international organisation:the AIEA, the CND, the UNIDO, the UNODC and the UNOOS.

== List of representatives ==
Diplomatic accreditation	Ambassador	Observations	List of presidents of Burundi	List of chancellors of Germany	Term end
1966	Pierre Bigaympunzi		Michel Micombero	Kurt Georg Kiesinger	1972
1972	Damien Ntahokagiye	Chargé d'affaires	Michel Micombero	Willy Brandt	1972
March 15, 1973	Adolphe Binagana	(* June 21, 1938 in Ngozi, Burundi)	Michel Micombero	Helmut Schmidt	1975
1975	Aloys Ndabunganiye	Chargé d'affaires	Michel Micombero	Helmut Schmidt	1976
1976	Jean Libère Ndabakwaje		Jean-Baptiste Bagaza	Helmut Schmidt	1977
1977	Antoine Meri	Chargé d'affaires	Jean-Baptiste Bagaza	Helmut Schmidt	1978
1978	Lazare Nzorubara		Jean-Baptiste Bagaza	Helmut Schmidt	1981
1981	Sébastian Ntahuga	Chargé d'affaires	Jean-Baptiste Bagaza	Helmut Schmidt	1984
January 5, 1984	Egide Nkuriyingoma	(* July 18, 1949 ): In 1981 he was ambassador in Moscow; In abril 1987 he was appointed Minister of Foreign Affairs (Burundi).	Jean-Baptiste Bagaza	Helmut Kohl	1985
1985	Sylvain Gahuya	Chargé d'affaires	Jean-Baptiste Bagaza	Helmut Kohl	1988
1988	Ildephonse Nkeramihigo		Pierre Buyoya	Helmut Kohl	
1988	Sébastien Ntahuga	*In 1991 he was appointed minister of justice	Pierre Buyoya	Helmut Kohl	1991
1991	Paul Ndayihereje	Chargé d'affaires	Pierre Buyoya	Helmut Kohl	1994
1994	Albert Mbonerane		Sylvestre Ntibantunganya	Helmut Kohl	1997
December 16, 1999	Aloys Mbonayo		Pierre Buyoya	Gerhard Schröder	2003
2003	Térence Nsanze		Domitien Ndayizeye	Gerhard Schröder	2004
2004	Pierre Sinarinzi	Chargé d'affaires	Domitien Ndayizeye	Gerhard Schröder	2007
June 2, 2007	Domitille Barancira		Pierre Nkurunziza	Angela Merkel	2010
2010	Barthélemy Mfayokurera	Chargé d'affaires	Pierre Nkurunziza	Angela Merkel	2011
December 15, 2011	Anatole Bacanamwo		Pierre Nkurunziza	Angela Merkel	2012
2012	Liberat Bunguza	Chargé d'affaires	Pierre Nkurunziza	Angela Merkel	2013
November 7, 2012	Edouard Bizimana	(* February 10, 1968)	Pierre Nkurunziza	Angela Merkel	
July 6, 2016	Else Nizigama Ntamagiro		Pierre Nkurunziza	Angela Merkel	
May 21, 2021	Appolonie Nibona		Évariste Ndayishimiye	Olaf Scholz	
February 14, 2024	Annonciata Sendazirasa		Évariste Ndayishimiye	Olaf Scholz	
