= Nizigama =

Nizigama is a surname. Notable people with the surname include:

- Aloÿs Nizigama (born 1966), Burundian long-distance runner
- Else Nizigama Ntamagiro (born 1972), Burundian diplomat
- Gabriel Nizigama, Burundian politician
- Lucie Nizigama (1957–2010), Burundian legal scholar and activist
