= Kayitesi =

Kayitesi is a Central African surname. Notable people with the surname include:

- Odette Kayitesi, Burundian politician
- Sonia Kayitesi (born 1998), Rwandan disk jockey
