= Uwizeye =

Uwizeye is a surname. Notable people with the surname include:

- Ibrahim Uwizeye (born 1972), Burundian politician
- Judith Uwizeye (born 1979), Rwandan lawyer
- Marc Uwizeye (born 1991), Rwandan recording artist
