= Melchior Nankwahomba =

Burundian politician

Member of the National Assembly
- In office 2010–2015

Governor of Kirundo Province, Burundi
- In office 2015–2019
- Preceded by: Réverien Nzigamasabo
- Succeeded by: Alain Tribert Mutabazi

Melchior Nankwahomba was a politician who was appointed governor of Kirundo Province in 2015.

== Career ==
=== National Assembly ===
Melchior Nankwahomba is a Hutu. In the 2010-2015 National Assembly Melchior Nankwahomba was the representative for Kirundo as a member of the CNDD-FDD (National Council for the Defense of Democracy – Forces for the Defense of Democracy). In April 2013 he attended a three day workshop on the APA (Aires Protégées d’Afrique Centrale, Protected Areas of Central Africa). On 2 September 2015 the president of Burundi named the governors of the provinces, including Melchior Nankwahomba as governor of Kirundo.

=== Governor of Kirundo ===
In May 2016 Burundian officials said the Rwanda had expelled more that 1,500 Burundians who had refused to move to refugee camps. Melchior Nankwahomba told Reuters that they had been given the choice of going to the camps or returning to Burundi. Those who refused the camps were stripped of their possessions and chased out. The mayor of Ntega Town said 1,320 returnees had recently arrived there. The expulsions were related to the ongoing political crisis in Burundi after President Pierre Nkurunziza decided to run for a third term, and over 200,000 people fled from Burundi.

90%of Burundians live by farming. In October 2016 Melchior Nankwahomba said that over 4,000 people had recently fled from their homes due to lack of food caused an exceptionally long dry season. People had left the communes of Bugabira, Busoni and Kirundo and moved to the neighboring Cankuzo Province. Some were so desperate that they tried to sell their land and houses for food.

In August 2017 Melchior Nankwahomba, governor of Kirundo Province, launched the transplanting of rice seedlings in the Nyavyamo Marsh. The rice harvest was estimated to be between 8 and 10 tons per hectare, or between 4,304 and 5,380 tonnes in total. Xinhua News Agency interviewed Melchior Nankwahomba in December 2017. He told them that an irrigation and water conservation project completed by the Chinese Stecol Corporation just southeast of Kirundo Town had greatly improved the lives of the local people by turning huge areas of marshland into farmland. A combination of dams, irrigation channels, drainage ditches and pumps controlled water levels, and the company had also built roads and prepared the sites of a school and bus station.

In December 2017 Melchior Nankwahomba spoke about the destruction of the hotel owned by opposition politician Jean Minani. He said that the theft and destruction was done by the watchmen that Minani had left to guard the property. They had not been paid for a long time. He said some had been caught and were in Ngozi central prison. He denied that the destruction had any political motives. In February 2018 Melchior Nankwahomba held a meeting with residents in Kirundo in which he asked them not to listen to rumours spread by people with an interest in stirring up trouble ahead of the coming elections. He also asked people who had electricity connections to install lights outside their houses to deter criminals.

Melchior Nankwahomba was still governor as of December 2018. In February 2019 the new governor of Kirundo, Alain Tribert Mutabazi, presented a report outlining achievements in 2018 and the outlook for 2019. The achievements includes construction of 67 classrooms, three health centers, five markets and village offices. Almost three million tree seedlings had been planted. Food had been distributed to the 2,000 families most affected by the drought.

=== Education official ===
In October 2019 Melchior Nankwahomba was Director of Social Affairs at Cibitoke Community College. In May 2021 it was reported that students at the University of Burundi had received their scholarship loans five months late, and had been told that they could not withdraw the full amount, but had to leave 5,000 frans in their accounts. Melchior Nankwahomba, Director of Social Affairs at the University of Burundi, could not be reached to comment on the issue. On 15 February 2023 Évariste Ndayishimiye named officials of the University of Burundi, including Melchior Nankwahomba as Director of Social Services.

== Sources ==
- "Annexe 1 - Institutions au Burundi (situation decembre 2018)" (PDF), Political Chronicles of the African Great Lakes Region, p. 122, 2018
- Atelier Sous-regional de Sensibilisation et de Reflexion des Parlementaires Sur l’APA (PDF), April 2013
- "Burundi Assemblée nationale 2010-2015", EveryPolitician
- "Burundi : Le marais de Nyavyamo donnera près de 5.380 tonnes de riz", AGnews, 14 August 2017
- Governor of Kirundo province asks people to mistrust rumors, L'agence burundaise de presse(ABP), 1 March 2018
- Habonimana, Innocent (25 October 2016), "Thousands flee famine due to drought in Kirundo Province", IWACU English News
- Jean De Dieu (21 February 2019), Presentation of the Achievements Report for the Year 2018 and Outlook
- Kirundo: le Gouverneur dément les rumeurs sur la destruction de l’hôtel de Jean Minini (in French), 4 December 2017
- Lyu Tianran (7 December 2017), Feature: Chinese company in Burundi turns vast marshland into farmland, Xinhua
- Ndayishimiye, Evariste (15 February 2023), Decret No 100/045 (PDF)
- Nkurunziza, Pierre (2 September 2015), Decret No 100/19 du 02 Septembre 2015 Portant Nomination des Gouverneurs des Provinces ... (PDF) (in French)
- "Rwanda expels over 1,500 Burundians as relations fray", Al Jazeera, 16 May 2016
- "Une partie du prêt-bourse des étudiants détournée pour une destination inconnue", Radio Inzamba (in French), 5 May 2021
- Visite d’une délégation de l’Cibitoke Community College au Campus Nyamugerera (in French), Cibitoke Community College, 25 October 2019
