= Janvière Ndirahisha =

Burundian academic and politician

Janvière Ndirahisha (born 1966) is a Burundian academic and politician. From 2015 to 2020 she was a Minister of Education for Burundi. She is President of the National Women's Forum (FNF).

== Life ==
Janvière Ndirahisha was born in 1966 in Burundi. She was educated at the University of Burundi before undertaking a PhD at the University of Antwerp. Her thesis on Grothiendiek representations was supervised by Fred Van Oystaeyen.

Ndirahisha was elected President of Burundi's new National Women's Forum in 2013.

In August 2015 Ndirahisha was announced as Minister of Education, Higher Education and Scientific Research in Pierre Nkurunziza's' cabinet. By 2019 she had moved to be Minister of Education, Technical & Vocational Training, with Gaspard Banyankimbona as Minister of Education, Higher Education and Scientific Research.

In 2017 Ndirahisha announced that headmasters of schools which had achieved under 30% in national tests would be dismissed, and her ministry closed several failing schools. In 2018 her ministry banned pregnant girls from attending school, a move which was criticised by equal rights campaigners in the country.

Nkurunziza's successor Évariste Ndayishimiye removed Ndirahisha from the cabinet in 2020.
