= Joseph Gahama =

Burundian historian

Prof.Joseph Gahama
- Born: 28 October 1953 (age 72)
- Citizenship: Burundian
- Education: University of Burundi (Bachelor of Arts in History with Education); Paris 1 Panthéon-Sorbonne University (Masters in History) (PhD in History of African Societies) (Habilitation to direct research (HDR))
- Scientific career
- Fields: African History
- Workplaces: University of Burundi, Kigali Institute of Education, University of Rwanda and East African University Rwanda

Joseph Gahama (born October 28, 1953) is a Burundian historian specialized in African history.

Gahama holds PhD in History of African Societies in 1980 from Paris 1 Panthéon-Sorbonne University. He served continuously 19 years as Senior Lecturer, Associate Professor and Professor of history department in University of Burundi from 1981 to 2000.

In 2000, Gahama moved to Rwanda where he worked in various universities such as Kigali Institute of Education (KIE), University of Rwanda and East African University Rwanda . He served as Vice Chancellor of East African University Rwanda from 2016 to 2020.

== Early life and education ==
Prof. Joseph Gahama was born on October 28, 1953, in Bujumbura, Burundi. He finished lower education in Bujumbura and he holds bachelor of Arts in history with education from University of Burundi in 1976.

In 1976, Gahama further enrolled in Paris 1 Panthéon-Sorbonne University, France for post graduate degrees. He graduated with master's degree in history in 1977, and PhD in history of African societies from same university in 1980.

Gahama obtained Habilitation to Direct Research (HDR) from Paris 1 Panthéon-Sorbonne University since 1996.

== Academic career ==
Gahama served as senior lecturer and head of history department at University of Burundi, Burundi from 1981 to 2000.

In 2000, Gahama moved to Rwanda and served at former Kigali Institute of Education now University of Rwanda, College of Education in different positions for 16 years. As professor of history from 2000 to 2016 additional to this, from 2004 to 2007 he served as director of research and consultancy, and from 2011 to 2016 served as dean of faculty of social sciences and business studies at same institution.

In 2016, Gahama was appointed as vice chancellor of East African University Rwanda located in Nyagatare until his retirement in 2020.

== Additional career ==
Professor Gahama served as a consultant for international organizations in their projects regarding to Africa including UNICEF, UNESCO, UNDP, the African Union to mention few. He has participated, with presentation of papers, in more than a hundred international conferences and seminars. He is the author of several books, articles and chapters in collective works on the socio-political history of Africa of the Great Lakes, especially Burundi and Rwanda. He is also a member of numerous national and international scientific and cultural associations

== Personal life ==
Gahama is married with 4 children.

== Publications ==
=== Books ===
- Burundi, panorama historique, Le Caire, Etudes scientifiques, 1986.
- Bibliographie signalétique spécialisée sur l’histoire du Burundi, Bujumbura, RPP, 1991
- Les régions orientales du Burundi, Paris, Karthala, 1994
- L’institution des bashingantahe au Burundi, Bujumbura, Presses Lavigerie, 1999
- Démocratie, bonne gouvernance et développement dans la région des Grands Lacs, Bujumbura, RPP, 1999
- Le Burundi sous administration belge, Paris: Karthala, 2nd edition, 2001
- Une nouvelle approche pour écrire et enseigner l’histoire au Rwanda, Paris, Editions universitaires européennes, 2012
- African Perspectives in the 21st century., Dakar, CODESRIA, 2015
- East African Community: Journey towards Regional Integration, IUCEA: Kampala, 2015
- Peace, Security and Post- Conflict Reconstruction in the Great Lakes Region, Dakar, CODESRIA, 2017

=== Books reviews ===
- Burundi : Biography of A Small African Country, by Nigel Watt, 2011
- La problématique de l’exécution des jugements et distorsions entre dispositions légales, pratiques sociales, coutumes et réalités locales au Burundi, by Dominik Kohihagen, 2007
