= Emmanuel Niyonkuru =

Burundian politician

Minister of Water, Environment, Spatial Planning and Urban Development
- In office 24 August 2015 – 1 January 2017

Personal details
- Born: 20 July 1962 Commune of Rutegama, Burundi
- Died: 1 January 2017 (aged 54) Bujumbura, Burundi
- Cause of death: Assassination
- Education: University of Burundi

Emmanuel Niyonkuru (20 July 1962 – 1 January 2017) was a Burundian politician.

== Life ==
Niyonkuru gained his higher education at the Faculty of Economic and Administrative Sciences at the University of Burundi from 1987 to 1991.

Later Niyonkuru followed a career in the banking industry. From 1992 to 2015, he worked as the deputy director of Bank of the Republic of Burundi (BRB). Emmanuel Niyonkuru was also elected to the Burundian Senate, representing the district of Muramvya for the 2015 to 2020 term.

In 2015, he was appointed to Burundi's Council of Ministers by Burundian President Pierre Nkurunziza, in charge of water, environment, spatial planning and urban development.

== Death ==
In 2017, as part of the political unrest in Burundi, Niyonkuru was assassinated by gunshot around midnight while on his way home to Rohero, a suburb in the then-capital city of Bujumbura, according to police. Six people, who are believed to be from Rwanda, were arrested in connection to the assassination. Burundian President Pierre Nkurunziza, stated that the crime would not go unpunished. Niyonkuru's assassination is one of many attacks against public faces of Nkurunziza's administration. He was buried at Mpanda in neighbouring Tanzania.
