= Ntakarutimana =

Ntakarutimana or Ntakirutimana is a Burundian surname. Notable people with the name include:

- Egide Ntakarutimana (born 1997), Burundian long-distance runner
- Sabine Ntakarutimana, Burundian politician
- Elizaphan Ntakirutimana, Rwandan pastor convicted of genocide
