= Domitien Ndihokubwayo =

Burundian politician

Minister of Economy, Finance and Development of Burundi
- In office May 2016 – 2022
- President: Pierre Nkurunziza; Évariste Ndayishimiye
- Preceded by: Tabu Abdallah
- Succeeded by: Audace Niyonzima

Personal details
- Party: CNDD–FDD

Domitien Ndihokubwayo (born October 4, 1966 in Ngozi Province) is a Burundian politician CNDD-FDD who served as the Minister of Finance in the governments of Prime Minister Alain-Guillaume Bunyoni from May 2016 to 2022. He succeeded Tabu Abdallah. In 2022, he was succeeded by Aundace Niyonzima.

== Career ==
Prior to this appointment, Ndihokubwayo was in charge of the Burundi Revenue Authority (OBR).

In his capacity as minister, Ndihokubwayo served as chair of the International Monetary Fund's African Caucus in 2021.

== Other activities ==
- African Development Bank (AfDB), Ex-Officio Member of the Board of Governors (since 2016)
