= Annonciata Sendazirasa =

Burundian politician

Ambassador of Burundi to Germany
- Incumbent
- Assumed office 14 February 2024
- President: Évariste Ndayishimiye
- Prime Minister: Gervais Ndirakobuca
- Preceded by: Appolonie Nibona

General Director of the Mutuelle de la Fonction Public (Civil Service Health Insurance Fund)
- In office 25 August 2020 – 20 Novembre 2023
- President: Évariste Ndayishimiye
- Prime Minister: Gervais Ndirakobuca
- Succeeded by: Dr. Sylvie Nzeyimana

Second Vice-Governor of the Bank of the Republic of Burundi
- In office 30 August 2020 – 18 June 2015
- President: Pierre Nkurunziza
- Succeeded by: Audace Niyonzima

Minister of Civil Services, Labour and social security of Burundi
- In office 30 August 2010 – 18 June 2015
- President: Pierre Nkurunziza

Personal details
- Born: 17 November 1963 (age 62) Burundi
- Party: CNDD–FDD

Annonciata Sendazirasa is a Burundian politician and educator, currently serving as Ambassador of Burundi to Germany. She was the former Minister of Civil Services, Labour and social security in Burundi, having been appointed to the position in 2010 by the former president of Burundi, Pierre Nkurunziza. Her term began on 30 August 2010 and ended on 18 June 2015.

Political offices
Preceded by Appolonie Nibona	Ambassador of Burundi to Germany; 2024 - Today	Succeeded by

Political offices
Preceded by	General Director of the Mutuelle de la Fonction Public (Civil Service Health Insurance Fund); 2020 - 2023	Succeeded by Dr Sylvie Nzeyimana

Political offices
Preceded by	Second Vice-Governor of the Bank of the Republic of Burundi; 2015 - 2020	Succeeded by Audace Niyonzima

Political offices
Preceded by	Minister of Civil Services, Labour and social security of Burundi; 2010 - 2015	Succeeded by
