= Albert Shingiro =

Burundian diplomat and politician

The Honourable Albert Shingiro
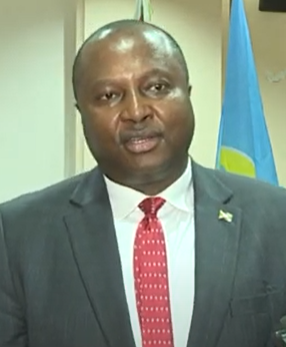

Minister of Foreign Affairs and Development Cooperation
- In office 30 June 2020 – 6 August 2025
- President: Évariste Ndayishimiye
- Preceded by: Ezéchiel Nibigira
- Succeeded by: Édouard Bizimana
- Prime Minister: Alain Guillaume Bunyoni; Gervais Ndirakobuca

Permanent Representative of Burundi to the United Nations in New York
- In office 4 September 2014 – 30 June 2020
- President: Pierre Nkurunziza; Pascal Nyabenda (acting); Évariste Ndayishimiye
- Preceded by: Herménélgide Niyonzima
- Succeeded by: Zéphyrin Maniratanga

Personal details
- Education: University of Benin; Laval University

Albert Shingiro (born 31 December 1970) is a Burundian diplomat. He served as the Minister of Foreign Affairs and Development Cooperation in the Republic of Burundi from 30 June 2020 until 6 August 2025.

== Background and education ==
Shingiro was born in 1970 in Buhiga, Karusi Province in Burundi and he is married with three children. He is an Anglican Christian. In 1998, Shingiro earned a bachelor's degree in Legal and Political Science from the University of Benin and a master's degree in International Relations from Laval University in Canada in 2003. He speaks Kirundi, Swahili, French, and English.

== Career ==
A career diplomat, Shingiro was appointed to various diplomatic positions. He was the second counselor of the Burundian Embassy in New York between the year 2006 to 2010. In 2012, he was appointed as the permanent secretary of the Ministry of Foreign Affairs, the appointment ended in 2014. In that same 2014, he was appointed as the Ambassador of the Republic of Burundi to the United Nations which ended in June 2020. On the 28 of June 2020, he was appointed as the Minister of Foreign Affairs.

On the 6 of August 2025, Shingiro was succeeded by Edouard Bizimana.
