= Ministry of Public Security of Burundi =

Government ministry of Burundi

Ministry of the Interior, Community Development, and Public Security
- Ministère de l’Intérieur, du Développement Communautaire et de la Sécurité Publique (French)
- Coat of arms of Burundi

Ministry overview
- Formed: 1962
- Preceding Ministry: Ministry of Interior and National Security
- Jurisdiction: Government of Burundi
- Headquarters: Ngagara,Quartier Industriel, Avenue Nyabisindu, N° 17 , Bujumbura
- Minister responsible: Hon. Léonidas Ndaruzaniye
- Ministry executives: Théophile Ndarufatiye, Permanent Secretary in charge of the Interior and Community Development portfolio; Police Brig. Gen. Richard Ndayisaba, Permanent Secretary in charge of the Public Security sector; Police Brig. Gen.Célestin Nibona Bonansize, Assistant Minister
- Website: mininterinfos.gov.bi

Ministry of the Interior, Community Development, and Public Security is the ministry of the interior of Burundi. The minister in 2007 was Venant Kamana. The clearing of land mines was among the tasks of the ministry after the civil war.

Since 2025, the ministry is led by retired Police Major General Léonidas Ndaruzaniye.
