= DJ Sonia =

Rwandan DJ (born 1998)

Sonia Kayitesi, commonly known as Dj Sonia born on October 31, 1998 (age 27), is a Rwandan disc jockey, business woman, event planner, model and fashionista.

== Early life and career ==
She joined deejaying Career since 2019. She is best known for her work in Music of Rwanda through, World Cup Qualifiers events. She contributed to a Rwandan ceremony of giving a name to a newborn baby gorilla, popular known as Kwita Izina.

Sonia has played in many different concerts, including Silent Disco, Decent Entertainment, Giants of Africa, the Hill Festival, and played in different hotels and most games, including the Women's Afrobasket Rwanda 2023, the FIBA World Cup, and many other places. DJ Sonia who is one of the many female DJs in mixing music in Kigali, was invited to a concert where she met Darassa who is one of the biggest names in Tanzanian music and Masauti who is one of the popular artists in Nairobi. She is currently one of the music mixers for the Rwandan national media, Radio Rwanda, Rwanda TV, and its second branch, KC2.

She performed as the Dj when Nigerian singers both Davido and Tiwa Savage went to Rwanda.
