= Tabu Abdallah =

Burundian politician and former minister

Tabu Abdallah Manirakiza
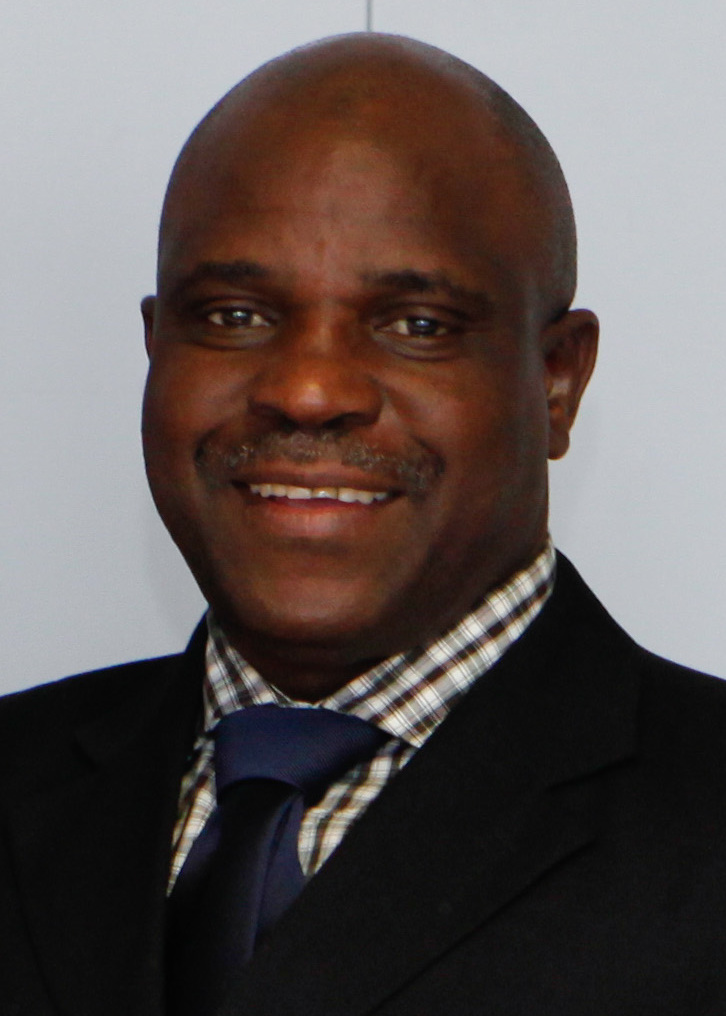
- Tabu Abdallah Manirakiza in 2014

Minister of Economy, Finance and Development of Burundi
- In office 2012–2016
- President: Pierre Nkurunziza
- Preceded by: Clotilde Nizigama
- Succeeded by: Domitien Ndihokubwayo

Personal details
- Party: CNDD-FDD
- Occupation: Politician

Tabu Abdallah Manirakiza commonly known as Tabu Abdallah is a Burundian CNDD-FDD politician and former Finance minister. He held that position from 2012 to 2016 when he was replaced by Domitien Ndihokubwayo.
