= Gerard Niyungeko =

Burundian judge

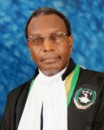

Judge of the African Court on Human and Peoples' Rights
- Incumbent
- Assumed office 2006

Personal details
- Occupation: Jurist, professor of law

Gerard Niyungeko was a Judge of the African Court on Human and Peoples' Rights, a position he was appointed to in 2006.

At the time of his election he was Professor of Law at the University of Burundi at Bujumbura. There, he holds the UNESCO Chair in Education for Peace and Conflicts Resolution. Dr. Niyungeko is also a consultant to the Political Affairs Commission of the African Union.

== Other positions held ==
- Member Associate, The Institute of International Law (IIL), Year of election 2019
- Member, Editorial Committee of the Research Group on the Democratic, Economic and Social Development of Africa (current)
- Visiting Professor in International Law, Free University of Brussels (2002–2003)
- International expert, United Nations Program for development in the judicial domain and in the domain of human rights (2002)
- Counsel for Niger, Boundary Dispute between Niger and Benin, International Court of Justice (2002)
- Member, Implementation Monitoring Committee for the Arusha Accord for Peace and Reconciliation in Burundi (2000)
- Member, Association for the Development of Education in Africa Working Group on Higher Education (1999)
- Member, Burundi delegation to the diplomatic conference of the United Nations on the creation of the International Criminal Court (1998)
- Vice Rector, University of Burundi (1997–2000)
- President, Constitutional Court of Burundi (1992–1996)
- Legal representative, Great Lakes University
- Member, Committee forming the Tribunal of the Preferential Trade Area for Eastern and Southern African States (1991–1995)
- President, Constitutional Commission of Burundi (1991–1992)
- Counsel for Burundi, LAFICO v. Holding Arabe Burundo Libyen (HALB), International Arbitral Tribunal, Brussels (1990–1991)
- Counsel for Burundi, Armed Activities on the Territory of the Congo (Democratic Republic of Congo v. Burundi),
- International Court of Justice (1999–2000)

== Publications ==
- La preuve devant les juridictions internationales (Brussels: Bruylant, forthcoming) (in French)
- Les droits de l'homme, cours destiné aux formateurs (Bujumbura, 1994) (in French)
- "L'impact du programme d'adjustement structurel sur le respect des droits économiques et sociaux au Burundi", 32 Revue Belge 8 (1999) (in French)
- "La mise en oeuvre du droit international humanitaire et le principe de la souveraineté des États", International Review of the Red Cross 113 (1991) (in French)
- Dr. Niyungeko is also the author of several training manuals on human rights
