= Burundi Ministry of Energy and Mines =

Government ministry of Burundi

Ministry of Mineral Resources, Energy, Industry, Trade and Tourism
- Coat of Arms of Burundi

Ministry overview
- Type: Ministry
- Jurisdiction: Government of Burundi
- Headquarters: ROHERO I, venue de la REVOLUTION Bujumbura, Burundi
- Minister responsible: Dr. Hassan Kibeya
- Ministry executives: Christine Niragira, Permanent Secretary in charge of Industry, Trade, Tourism, and Central Administration; Dr. Martin Ndayizeye, Permanent Secretary in charge of Mining and Energy Resources; Pacifique Nshimirimana, Assistant Minister
- Website: Homepage

The Burundi Ministry of Energy and Mines also known as the Ministry of Mineral Resources, Energy, Industry, Trade and Tourism is responsible for managing energy development and distribution in Burundi. The main function of the Ministry of Energy and Mines include: design and implement the National policy in energy, geology and Mines; promote geological research and mining industry activities; developing and implementing policies related to electricity, minerals, petroleum and petroleum products. The current Cabinet Minister of Energy is Dr. Hassan Kibeya, Jiji and Mulembwe Hydropower Project (PHJIMU), Hydro-Electric Plant Mpanda, Hydro-Electric Plant Kabu 16, Hydro-Electric Plant Rusumo falls, Kagu Project, Ruzizi III, Ruvyironza, Hydro-Electric Plant in Kirasa-Karonge, Peat Power Project.

== Location ==
The headquarters of the ministry are located at Municipality Mukaza Kabondo district ROHERO zone Avenue du 13 October N ° 6 in Bujumbura the capital city of the country.

== Scope of activities ==
The ministry is responsible for the design and execution of the National policy in energy, geology and mines, promoting geological research and mining industry activities, developing an Energy Supply program with a view to ensuring sustainable access for the population to modern energy sources, promoting renewable energies through appropriate research and dissemination actions, and the planning, construction and management of hydraulic, energy and basic sanitation infrastructures. The major power projects include the Rusumo Hydroelectric Power Station.

== Auxiliary institutions and allied agencies ==
- areen.bi
- REGIDESO Burundi
- www.obm.bi
- www.aber.bi
- ministere-energie-mines.gov.bi/onatour/
- www.aber.bi

== See also ==
- Energy Regulators Association of East Africa
