= Christine Nzeyimana =

Burundian judge

Christine Nzeyimana is a Burundian judge. From 2007 to 2013 she was president of the Constitutional Court of Burundi.

LNzeyimana was a judge on Burundi's Supreme Court. In 2006 she was one of the three judges who decided the case of former president Domitien Ndayizeye, former vice-president Alphonse Kadege, and the five others accused of "threatening state security".

Nzeyimana has no party affiliation. She is married to the diplomat Adolphe Nahayo.
