= National Women's Forum =

The National Women's Forum (Forum National des Femmes, FNF) is a women's organization in Burundi, founded in 2013. Its president is Janvière Ndirahisha.

== History ==
The FNF was launched on 22 March 2013 at Bugenyuzi Commune in Karuzi Province. In May 2013 an office was established, and an Executive Board was elected, with Janvière Ndirahisha as president, and Ménédore Nibaruta as deputy president. The organization received funding from UNFPA and Care Burundi.

A representative from the National Women's Forum served on the 2017 committee charged with proposing an amendment to the Constitution of Burundi.
