= Audace Niyonzima =

Burundian politician

Minister of Economy, Finance and Development of Burundi
- In office 2022 – 12 December 2024
- President: Évariste Ndayishimiye
- Preceded by: Domitien Ndihokubwayo

Audace Niyonzima is a Burundian politician. He was appointed as Minister of Finance, Budget and Economic Planning in 2022.

Niyonzima was 51 years old in 2022, so he was born 1970-1972. He is from Muyinga province.

Niyonzima earned an economics degree from University of Yaoundé in 2002. From 2003 to 2017 he worked as economist in Bank of the Republic of Burundi. From 2017 to 2021 he worked in the Burundi Revenue Authority. In April 2021 he was appointed and the first deputy governor of Bank of the Republic of Burundi.
