= Joseph Mbazumutima =

Former Burundian politician

Joseph Mbazumutima (born 11 April 1937) was a Burundian politician.

== Early life ==
Joseph Mbazumutima was born on 11 April 1937 into a Ganwa family. He was educated at the Groupe Scolaire de Astrida.

== Career ==
Mbazumutima served as the private secretary of Mwami Mwambutsa IV, his second cousin, from 1955 to 1961. In September 1961 he was elected to the Legislative Assembly as a member of the Union for National Progress (Union pour le Progrès national, UPRONA) party. He adhered to the Casblanca faction in the body. The government considered making him an ambassador to either the United States or the Soviet Union, but he was never given such an appointment.

In January 1963 Mbazumutima was appointed chief administrator of the Institut Murundi d'Information et de Documentation. In May he was appointed Grand Marshall of the Royal Court. He was appointed Minister of Foreign Affairs on 6 April 1964. By 1966 he was serving as the administrator of the Burundian National Bank. He was dismissed in November 1968.

== Works cited ==
- Lemarchand, René (1970). Rwanda and Burundi. New York: Praeger Publishers. OCLC 254366212.
- Weinstein, Warren (1976). Historical Dictionary of Burundi. Metuchen: Scarecrow Press. ISBN 978-0-8108-0962-8.
