= Domitille Barancira =

Burundian judge and diplomat

Domitille Barancira is a Burundian judge, jurist, and diplomat, who chaired the Constitutional Court from 1998 until 2006. She subsequently served as Burundi's ambassador to Germany from 2007 to 2010. She is recognised as one of Burundi's foremost campaigners for women's rights and has contributed significantly to judicial reform in her country.

== Career ==
Domitille Barancira took a law degree from the University of Burundi. She worked as a judge between 1983 and 1996, acting as deputy chair of the Supreme Court from 1992 until 1996. She was chair of the Bujumbura Court of Appeal for two years and afterwards became chair of the Constitutional Court in 1998. She was appointed to the latter post by President Pierre Buyoya and held it until 2006. She was also head of the Commission of Reform and Modernization of the Burundian Justice System. In 2006, she was a nominee for the African Court on Human and Peoples' Rights.

In 1997, Barancira told Agence France-Presse that 17 people who had been sentenced to death as a result of ethnic violence following the assassination of President Melchior Ndadaye in 1993 had appealed their sentences unsuccessfully. She added that nobody had been executed since cases of cannibalism 15 years previously. In the appellate court, she upheld the death sentence for Pierre Nkurunziza in 1998; she later administered his oath as president in 2005, when she was head of the Constitutional Court. In the 2000s, she became one of Burundi's foremost campaigners for women's rights alongside Catherine Mabobori, Vestine Mbundagu, Marie-Christine Ntagwirumugara and Sabine Sabimbona. In 2007, she became Burundi's ambassador to Germany; she retired from the post in 2010.
