= Édouard Bizimana =

Burundian diplomat and ambassador

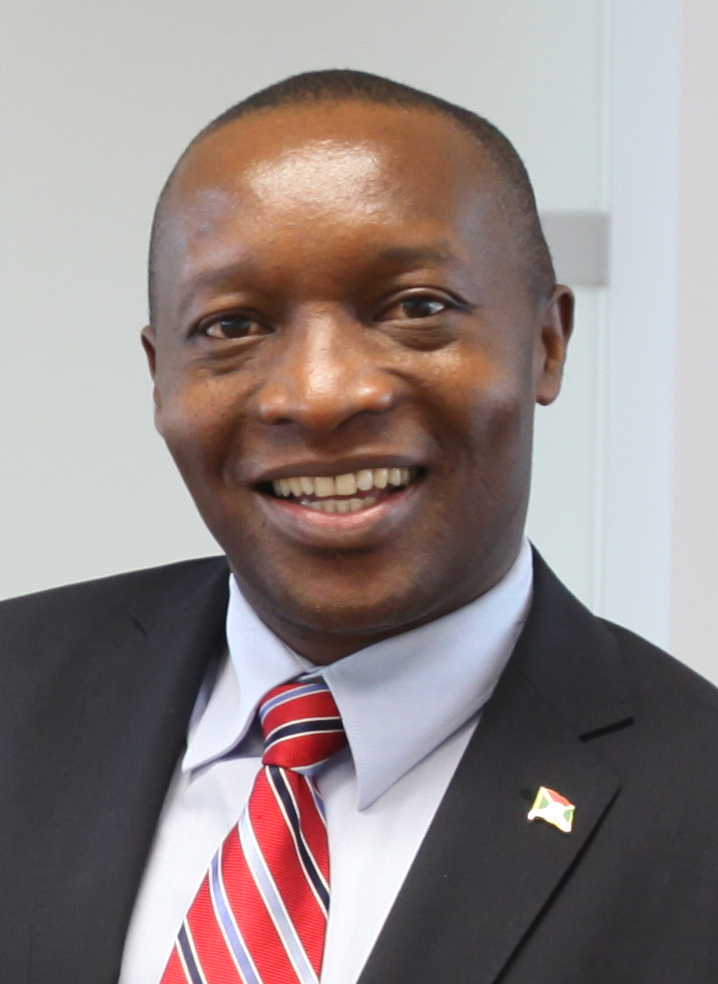
- Edouard Bizimana at the UNIDO accreditation in Vienna in September 2014

Minister of Foreign Affairs and Development Cooperation
- Incumbent
- Assumed office 6 August 2025
- Preceded by: Albert Shingiro
- President: Évariste Ndayishimiye
- Prime Minister: Nestor Ntahontuye

Ambassador of Burundi to Russia
- In office 2016–2021
- President: Évariste Ndayishimiye; Pierre Nkurunziza

Ambassador of Burundi to Germany
- In office 2012–2016
- President: Pierre Nkurunziza
- Succeeded by: Else Nizigama Ntamagiro

Personal details
- Born: 10 February 1968 (age 58) Burundi
- Party: CNDD-FDD
- Education: Yaoundé University II (PhD); Yaoundé University II(DESS); University of Yaoundé I (Bachelor); University of Burundi

Édouard Bizimana (born 10 February 1968) is a Burundian diplomat and politician. He served as Burundian Ambassador to Germany from 2012 to 2016. After serving as Ambassador to Russia, he became Burundi's Foreign Minister in 2025.

== Biography ==
Edouard Bizimana graduated from high school in Rusengo, Ruyigi Province, Burundi, in 1990. From 1990 to 1993, he studied at the University of Burundi in Bujumbura, specializing in language and English literature. He continued his studies from 1996 to 1998 at University of Yaoundé I in Yaoundé, Cameroon's capital, earning a Bachelor's degree in Modern English Letters. In 2000, he received a Diploma of Advanced Studies (DESS) in International Relations from the Institute of International Relations of Cameroon (IRIC) at Yaoundé University II . He earned his doctorate there in 2003 with a dissertation on "Armed Conflicts and Environmental Protection in the Great Lakes Region". During his studies, he completed internships at institutions including the Cameroonian Ministry of Foreign Affairs, the Cameroonian Athletics Federation, and the Institute for Diplomatic Studies in Cairo.

Edouard Bizimana is married and the father of four children.

== Diplomatic career ==
Since 2004, Edouard Bizimana worked for the Burundian Ministry of Foreign Affairs, initially as an advisor to the Director General for Cooperation with Europe, North America, and Non-Governmental Organizations. From 2006, he served as Deputy Chief of Protocol in the office of Second Vice President Marina Barampama, and from 2007 to 2010 as First Counselor at the Burundian Embassy in Washington, D.C. At the Burundian Ministry of External Relations and International Cooperation, he was responsible for international and regional organizations from February 2010. Shortly thereafter, he became a Ministerial Counselor in the Burundian Permanent Forum of Political Parties.

On 22 June 2012, Edouard Bizimana was appointed ambassador to Berlin. He was also accredited to Austria, the Vatican, the Czech Republic, Slovakia, and the United Nations organizations in Vienna. He held this post until 2016. His successor in Germany was Else Nizigama Ntamagiro. After a subsequent posting as Burundian ambassador to Moscow, he became his country's minister of foreign affairs. He became foreign minister in 2025.

== Publications ==
- Quelle diplomatie pour les pays post-conflit? Harmattan, Paris 2008, ISBN 978-2-296-06642-7.
