= Denise Sinankwa =

Burundian politician

Minister of Finance
- In office 13 September 2006 – 13 July 2007
- Preceded by: Dieudonne Ngowembona
- Succeeded by: Clotilde Nizigama

Denise Sinankwa is Burundian politician. She served as Minister of Finance.

In 2007, she left the country for France due to the Interpetrol Burundi embezzlement case.

== See also ==
- List of female finance ministers
