= Victoire Ndikumana =

Burundian politician

Victoire Ndikumana (born 1957) is a Burundian politician for the UPRONA party. She was Minister of Women's Advancement and Social Protection from 1991 to 1993, and Minister of Trade, Industry, Posts and Tourism from 2010 to 2014.

== Life ==
Victoire Ndikumana was born into a Tutsi family in Monyi, the daughter of Emile Ndikumana and Augusta Gahimbare. She was educated at the University of Burundi. In 1979 she married Daniel Sejiji, with whom she has two sons, one daughter, 2 grandsons, and 2 granddaughters.

From 1991 to 1993 Ndikumana was Minister of Women's Advancement and Social Protection. In the 1993 election, the first multi-party parliamentary elections since 1965, she was elected MP representing Cankuzo Province, as one of 16 UPRONA MPs. After the outbreak of the Burundian Civil War in 1993, Ndikumana called on Burundian women to take part in civil society and restore an emphasis on peaceful social values over violence. In 1996 Ndikumana was against United Nations proposals to send a standby peacekeeping force to neighboring Zaire:

Such a force, which will contribute to the divisions between Burundians, should not be tried. We don’t know what this force will do, [but] in Central Africa and Somalia, we have never seen what this [U.N.] force could achieve.

Ndikumana served as Treasurer of the AMANI Forum.

In August 2010 Ndikumana was one of three UPRONA MPs appointed to be ministers in President Pierre Nkurunziza's power-sharing government, when she was appointed Minister of Trade, Industry, Posts and Tourism. She saw it as a priority to address Burundi's trade deficit by increasing imports. In February 2014 Nkurunziza and the other two UPRONA ministers resigned their ministerial positions. They objected to Nkurunziza's sacking of his UPRONA vice-president, Bernard Busokoza, and to efforts by the ruling CNDD-FDD party to replace Charles Nditjie, UPRONA party chairman, with someone more sympathetic to CNDD-FDD before the 2015 elections.

In 2012 Ndikumana received an International Women's Day Women Achiever Award from the Institute of South Asian Women (ISAW).

== Works ==
- (with Christophe Sebudandi) A la conquête de la parole: La participation des femmes dans la transition démocratique au Burundi. International Alert, July 2012.
