= Ibrahim Uwizeye =

Ministers in Burundi

Minister of Hydraulics, Energy and Mines
- Incumbent
- Assumed office June 2020
- President: Évariste Ndayishimiye
- Prime Minister: Alain-Guillaume Bunyoni

National Assembly Deputy
- In office ?–?

Personal details
- Born: 1972 (age 53–54) Kirundo Province, Burundi
- Education: University of Burundi

Eng. Ibrahim Uwizeye (born 1972) is a Burundian politician, currently the Minister of Hydraulics, Energy and Mines in Burundi. He was appointed by President Évariste Ndayishimiye in June 2020.

== Background and education ==
Uwizeye was born in 1972 in Kirundo Province. He has a diploma in Industrial Engineering in Planning and Urbanism from the University of Burundi.

== Career ==
Ibrahim Uwizeye served as a Construction Engineer in private companies before he went in to politics. In 2006, Uwizeye served as the Head of the North Office of Town Planning and Housing and later became the Director of Urban management. Thereafter, he was appointed Deputy in the National Assembly for two legislatures. From 2020 to 2015, Uwizeye was a Secretary of the Standing Committee on Agriculture and Livestock, Environment and Communal Development.
