= Minister of Finance, Budget and Economic Planning (Burundi) =

Minister of finance, budget and economic planning of Burundi

Ministry of Finance, Budget and Digital Economy
- Ministère des Finances, du Budget et de l'Économie Numérique (French)
- Coat of arms of Burundi

Ministry overview
- Formed: 1961
- Preceding Ministry: Ministry of Finance, Budget and Economic Planning
- Jurisdiction: Government of Burundi
- Headquarters: Building of the Ministry of Finance, Budget and Digital Economy, 5th Floor, Office N° 522, Boulevard du Japon, BP 1830, Bujumbura
- Minister responsible: Hon Dr. Alain Ndikumana
- Ministry executives: Francine Inarukundo, Permanent Secretary; Isidora Ntakiyiruta, Assistant Minister
- Website: finances.gov.bi

Minister of Finance, Budget and Digital Economy of Burundi is a government minister in charge of the Ministry of Finance, Budget and Economic Planning of Burundi, responsible for public finances of the country.

== Ministers responsible for finance ==
Name	Took office	Left office	Notes
Léopold Bihumugani	Jan 1961	Sept 1961	
Pierre Ngendandumwe,	Sept 1961	June 1963	
Ferdinand Bitariho	June 1963	April 1964	
Rémy Nsengiyumva	April 1964	Sept 1965	
Mathieu Muhakwanke	Sept 1965	July 1966	
Donatien Bihute	July 1966	Nov 1967	
Joseph Ndabaniwe	Nov 1967	July 1968	
Joseph Hicuburundi	July 1968	March 1974	
Samuel Nduwingoma	March 1974	Sept 1974	
Gabriel Mpozagara	Sept 1974	Nov 1976	
Dominique Shirimanga	1976	1978	
Astère Girukwigomba	1978	1980	
Andre Bibwa	1980	1982	
Edouard Kadigiri	1982	1984	
Pierre Ngenzi	1984	1987	
Pierre Binoba	1987	1988	
Gérard Niyibigira	1988	1993	
Bernard Ciza	1994	1994	
Salvator Toyi	1994	1996	
Gerard Niyibigira	1996	1998	
Astère Girukwigomba	1998	2000	
Charles Nihangaza	2000	2001	
Edouard Kadigiri	2001	2003	
Athanase Gahungu	2003	2005	
Dieudonne Ngowembona	2005	2006	
Denise Sinankwa	2006	2007	
Clotilde Nizigama	2007	2012	
Tabu Abdallah	2012	2016	
Domitien Ndihokubwayo	May 2016	2022	
Audace Niyonzima	2022	12 December 2024	
Nestor Ntahontuye	12 December 2024	5 August 2025	
Alain Ndikumana	6 August 2025	Present	

== See also ==
- Bank of the Republic of Burundi
- Economy of Burundi
