= Kwita Izina =

Rwandan ceremony of giving a name to a newborn baby gorilla

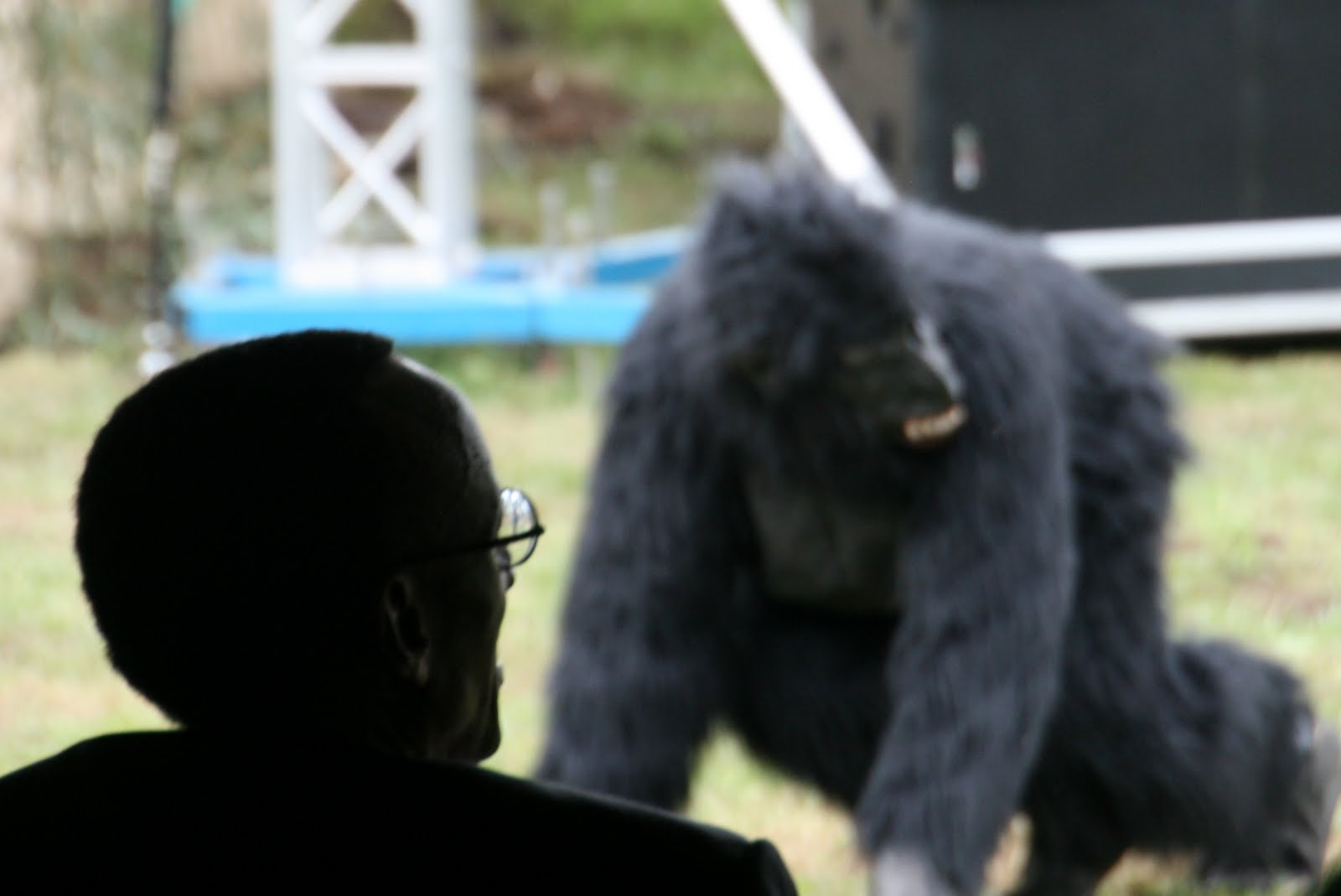
President Kagame of Rwanda watching the 6th annual Kwita Izina celebration

Kwita Izina is a Rwandan ceremony of giving a name to a newborn baby gorilla. It is named after the traditional baby naming ceremony that takes place after the birth of a newborn child in Rwandan culture. Rwanda adapted this tradition for gorilla conservation, officially launching Kwita Izina in 2005.

The ceremony's main goal is in helping monitor each individual gorilla and their groups in their natural habitat. It was created as a means of bringing attention both locally and internationally about the importance of protecting the mountain gorillas and their habitats in Volcanoes National Park in the Virunga Mountains in the north of the country. Since 2005, 438 mountain gorillas have been named through Kwita Izina.

== Other sources ==
- Infant Gorilla Naming 2023 - Kwita Izina - 29 August 2023 | Dian Fossey Gorilla Fund
- Rwanda: Kwita Izina Ceremony to Celebrate 18 Baby Gorillas- 16 June 2009
- Africa: Kenya, Uganda Spice Up Kwita Izina- 13 June 2009
- CNN founder Ted Turner treks Mountain Gorillas - 26 May 2009
- Kwita Izina: Rwanda’s 5th Annual Gorilla Naming Ceremony - Jun 25 2009
- "Year of the Gorilla" 5th annual Rwandan Kwita Izina ceremony, to be held on June 20th, 2009
- Rwanda: Kwita Izina Ceremony to Celebrate 18 Baby Gorillas
- Wildlife Direct - Photos From Gorilla Naming Ceremony Jun 23 2008
