= Ministry of Foreign Affairs and Development Cooperation =

Government ministry of Burundi

Ministry of Foreign Affairs, Regional Integration and Development Cooperation
- Ministère des Affaires Étrangères, de l'Intégration Régionale et de la Coopération au Développement (French)
- Coat of arms of Burundi

Ministry overview
- Formed: 1962
- Preceding Ministry: Ministry of Foreign Affairs and Development Cooperation
- Jurisdiction: Government of Burundi
- Headquarters: Boulevard de la Liberté n°15 B.P 1840, Bujumbura
- Minister responsible: Hon. Amb. Dr. Édouard Bizimana
- Ministry executives: Sophonie Nitunga, Permanent Secretary in Charge of Foreign Affairs and Development Cooperation; Sévérin Mbarubukeye, Permanent Secretary in Charge of East African Affairs; Amb. Else Nizigama Ntamagiro, Foreign Affairs Assistant Minister
- Website: www.mae.gov.bi/en/

The Ministry of Foreign Affairs, Regional Integration and Development Cooperation (French: Ministère des Affaires Étrangères, de l'Intégration Régionale et de la Coopération au Développement) is the foreign ministry of the republic of Burundi.

== List of ministers ==
This is a list of all Ministers of Foreign Affairs

Name	Portrait	Term of office		Notes
Name	Portrait	Took office	Left office	Notes
Lorgio Nimubona		1 July 1962	1963	
Joseph Mbazumutima		1964	1965	
Marc Manirakiza		1965	8 July 1966	
Pié Masumbuko		12 July 1966	16 September 1967	
Prime Niyongabo		6 December 1966	13 March 1967	
Michel Micombero		13 March 1967	14 November 1967	
Lazare Ntawurishira		14 November 1967	11 December 1969	
Libère Ndabakwaje		11 December 1969	3 March 1971	
Artémon Simbananiye		3 March 1971	11 November 1974	
Gilles Bimazubute		11 November 1974	27 November 1975	
Melchior Bwakira		27 November 1975	1 November 1976	
Albert Muganga		13 November 1976	13 October 1978	
Édouard Nzambimana		13 October 1978	8 November 1982	
Laurent Nzeyimana		8 November 1982	2 April 1987	
Egide Nkuriyingoma		2 April 1986	3 September 1987	
Cyprien Mbonimpa		1 October 1987	2 April 1992	
Libère Bararunyeretse		2 April 1992	10 July 1993	
Sylvestre Ntibantunganya		10 July 1993	22 December 1993	
Jean‐Marie Ngendahayo		22 December 1993	3 March 1995	
Paul Munyembari		3 March 1995	12 October 1995	
Vénérand Bakevyumusaya		12 October 1995	25 July 1996	
Luc Rukingama		4 August 1996	11 June 1998	
Severin Ntahomvukiye		11 June 1998	1 November 2001	
Therence Sinunguruza		1 November 2001	31 August 2005	
Antoinette Batumubwira		31 August 2005	14 January 2009	
Augustin Nsanze		14 January 2009	7 November 2011	
Laurent Kavakure		7 November 2011	18 May 2015	
Alain Aimé Nyamitwe		18 May 2015	19 April 2018	
Ezéchiel Nibigira		19 April 2018	30 June 2020	
Albert Shingiro		30 June 2020	6 August 2025	
Édouard Bizimana		6 August 2025	Present	
