= Jean Baptiste Gahimbare =

Burundian politician

Minister of Good Governance, Privatization, General Inspection of the State and Local Administration of Burundi
- In office August 30, 2010 – 18 June 2015
- President: Pierre Nkurunziza

Personal details
- Born: Burundi
- Party: CNDD–FDD

Jean Baptiste Gahimbare is a Burundian politician. Gahimbare was the former Minister of Good Governance, Privatization, General Inspection of the State and Local Administration in Burundi, having been appointed to the position in 2010 by the former president of Burundi, Pierre Nkurunziza. The term began on August 30, 2010.

Awards and achievements
| Preceded by | Minister of Good Governance, Privatization, General Inspection of the State and Local Administration of Burundi | Succeeded by |
