= Pierre Mupira =

Burundian politician

Minister of Communal Development of Burundi
- In office August 30, 2010 – 18 June 2015
- President: Pierre Nkurunziza

Personal details
- Born: Burundi
- Party: CNDD–FDD

Pierre Mupira is a Burundian politician and educator. He was the former Minister of Communal Development in Burundi, having been appointed to the position in 2010 by the former president of Burundi, Pierre Nkurunziza. His term began on August 30, 2010.

Awards and achievements
Preceded by	Minister of Communal Development of Burundi	Succeeded by
