= 2005 Burundian elections =

2005 Burundian elections may refer to:

- 28 February 2005 — 2005 Burundian constitutional referendum
- 3 June and 7 June 2005 — 2005 Burundian communal elections
- 4 July 2005 — 2005 Burundian legislative election
- 29 July 2005 — 2005 Burundian Senate election
- 19 August 2005 — 2005 Burundian presidential election
