= Julien Nimubona =

Burundian politician

Minister of Education and Scientific Research of Burundi
- In office August 30, 2010 – 18 June 2015
- President: Pierre Nkurunziza

Personal details
- Born: Burundi
- Party: UPRONA(Union pour le Progès National)

Julien Nimubona is a Burundian politician and educator. He was the former Minister of Education and Scientific Research in Burundi, having been appointed to the position in 2010 by the former president of Burundi, Pierre Nkurunziza. His term began on August 30, 2010.

Awards and achievements
| Preceded by | Minister of Education and Scientific Research of Burundi | Succeeded by |
