= Samuel Ndayiragije =

Burundian politician

Minister of Water, Energy and Minerals of Burundi
- In office 14 November 2007 – 11 August 2013
- President: Pierre Nkurunziza

Personal details
- Born: Burundi
- Party: CNDD–FDD

Samuel Ndayiragije is a Burundian politician. He was the former Minister of Water, Energy and Minerals in Burundi, having been appointed to the position in 2007 by the former president of Burundi, Pierre Nkurunziza. His term began on 14 November 2007.

Awards and achievements
Preceded by	Minister of Water, Energy and Minerals of Burundi	Succeeded by
