= Alain Mutabazi =

Burundian politician

Governor of Kirundo Province, Burundi
- In office 2015–2020
- Preceded by: Melchior Nankwahomba
- Succeeded by: Albert Hatungimana

Minister of Defense

Alain Tribert Mutabazi is a Burundian politician who was the governor of northern Province of Kirundo and later was appointed Minister of Defense.

== Background ==
Mutabazi is a native of the Ntega commune in Kirundo province. He was educated at the University of Burundi where he was a representative of the Imbonerakure youth. He was a Director of Vocational Education in Kirundo province and was later appointed Economic Advisor to the Governor of the Kirundo Province.

== Governor of Kirundo ==
Melchior Nankwahomba was governor of Kirundo Province as of December 2018. In February 2019, as the new governor of Kirundo, Alain Tribert Mutabazi presented a report outlining achievements in 2018 and the outlook for 2019. Plans for the year 2019 included an extension of the Kirundo University Institute of Lakes, a modern stadium to be built in Renga village, Busoni Commune, a project to electrify the communes of Busoni, Bwambarangwe and Gitobe, a state project for manage marshes and irrigation to deal with climate change, and the Kirundo Town Extension Project. He also talked of preparations for the 2020 elections.

== Minister of Defense ==
In June 2020 President Évariste Ndayishimiye appointed his first government. It included Engineer Alain-Tribert Mutabazi, former governor of Kirundo Province, as Minister of National Defense. In April 2021 Mutabazi admitted that lack of discipline was a major problem in the army, that had to be addressed quickly. Many of the crimes were the result of drunken arguments, including three recent killings in less than one month.

In August 2023 Mutabazi travelled to Moscow to attend an International Military-Technical Forum organized by the Russian Ministry of Defense. He met with defense officials and the Russian arms exporter Rosoboronexport to discuss impleemtation of the military-technical agreement the two countries had signed the previous year. In April 2024 Mutabazi said that the Burundi National Defense Force (FDNB) wanted good relations with all countries, and was non-aligned with the great powers over military cooperation, including the European Union, Russian Federation and United States of America. As of June 2024 Alain Tribert Mutabazi continued to hold office as Minister of National Defense and Veterans Affairs.

== Sources ==
- "Annexe 1 - Institutions au Burundi (situation decembre 2018)" (PDF), Political Chronicles of the African Great Lakes Region, p. 122, 2018
- "Burundi Defense Minister Worried About Drunkenness Among Soldiers", Taarifa Rwanda, 2021-04-16, archived from the original on 2021-04-16
- Emery Kwizera (23 April 2024), Coopération militaire avec les grandes puissances : « La FDNB pratique le non-alignement » (in French), Iwacu
- Membres du Gouvernement (in French), Presidency of Burundi
- "Perezida Ndayishimiye Yashyizeho Leta Nshya mu Burundi", Ijwi ry'Amerika (in Kinyarwanda)
- Jean De Dieu (21 February 2019), Presentation of the Achievements Report for the Year 2018 and Outlook
