= Jean-Jacques Nyenimigabo =

Burundian politician (1949–2026)

Minister of Youth, Culture and Sports of Burundi
- In office 30 August 2010 – 18 June 2015
- President: Pierre Nkurunziza

Personal details
- Born: 25 May 1949 Mubuga, Gitega Province, Ruanda-Urundi
- Died: 29 September 2026 (aged 77)
- Party: CNDD–FDD

Jean-Jacques Nyenimigabo (25 May 1949 – 29 September 2026) was a Burundian politician. He was the former Minister of Youth, Culture and Sports in Burundi, having been appointed to the position in 2010 by the former president of Burundi, Pierre Nkurunziza. His term began on 30 August 2010. He was the member of parliament of Mubuga zone. Nyenimigabo died on 29 September 2026, at the age of 77.

Awards and achievements
Preceded by	Minister of Youth, Culture and Sports of Burundi	Succeeded by
