= Moïse Bucumi =

Burundian politician

Minister of Water, Energy and Minerals of Burundi
- In office August 30, 2010 – 18 June 2015
- President: Pierre Nkurunziza

Personal details
- Born: Burundi
- Party: CNDD–FDD

Moïse Bucumi is a Burundian politician. He was the former Minister of Water, Energy and Minerals in Burundi, having been appointed to the position in 2010 by the former president of Burundi, Pierre Nkurunziza. His term began on August 30, 2010.

Awards and achievements
| Preceded by | Minister of Water, Energy and Minerals of Burundi | Succeeded by |
