= Ezéchiel Nibigira =

Burundian politician

The Honourable Dr. Ezéchiel Nibigira
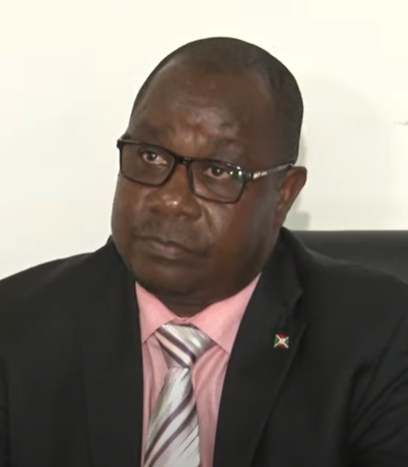

President of the Commission of ECCAS
- Incumbent
- Assumed office 6 September 2025
- Preceded by: Gilberto Da Piedade Verissimo

Minister of East African Community Affairs, Youth, Sports and Culture
- In office 30 June 2020 – 2 Octobre 2023
- President: Évariste Ndayishimiye
- Prime Minister: Alain-Guillaume Bunyoni
- Preceded by: Isabelle Ndahayo
- Succeeded by: Gervais Abayeho

Minister of External Relations and International Cooperation
- In office 19 April 2018 – 30 June 2020
- President: Pierre Nkurunziza; Pascal Nyabenda (acting); Évariste Ndayishimiye
- Prime Minister: Alain-Guillaume Bunyoni
- Preceded by: Alain-Aimé Nyamitwe
- Succeeded by: Albert Shingiro

Personal details
- Party: CNDD FDD
- Education: Walden University (DBA); Hope Africa University (MBA)
- Profession: Diplomat

Dr. Ezéchiel Nibigira is a Burundian politician who served as Minister of Foreign Affairs of the Republic of Burundi fro April 2018 to June 2020. He was then appointed as Minister of East African Community Affairs, Youth, Sports and Culture in June 2020 under Évariste Ndayishimiye's first cabinet. He was replaced by Amb. Gervais Abayeho in October 2023. Since 6 September 2025, he has been serving as President of the Commission of the Economic Community of Central African States.

He was previously Ambassador of Burundi in Kenya and leader of the youth wing of Burundi's ruling party CNDD-FDD. He was also a Member of Parliament representing Bujumbura rural where he chaired Burundi's parliament's Finance committee. Prior to his appointment as Minister, Nibigira was head of Burundi's customs as well as imports and exports. During President Pierre Nkurunziza's 2010 elections campaign, Nibigira was a chief campaign manager. Nibigira earned a Bachelor of Arts degree in business from Hope Africa University.
