= Marc Uwizeye =

Rwandan film producer and recording artist (born 1991)

Marc Uwizeye, commonly known as Rocky Kimomo (/kɪmoʊˈmoʊ/; born August 24, 1991 (age 35) in Kigali, Rwanda, to Gerrard Nzamurambaho and Immaculée Batamuliza, is a Rwandan recording artist,songwriter, sculptor, dubbing artist, and film producer.

== Early life and career ==
He has been in film production since 2015, and he is best known for his work, which includes the Wrath of the Soldier soundtrack and his contribution to the music of Rwanda through Rocky Entertainment. In 2023, Rocky Kimomo premiered a movie called Wrath of Soldier and specialized in sculpture.

Rocky Kimomo is the one who organized the tour to support the Visit Rwanda program through Rwandan celebrities.He started the campaign by encouraging them to visit their local parks, which include Nyungwe National Park and Volcanoes National Park and Akagera National Park. Rocky Kimomo is currently working as a brand ambassador for Itel Mobile.

== Philanthropy ==
Rocky Kimomo donates to charity organizations working in the Gasabo District. Those foundations care for children infected with congenital HIV.He also pays for their school fees and basic needs, apart from funding them.
