= Concilie Nibigira =

Burundian politician

Minister of Information, Communication, Relations with Parliament of Burundi
- In office 30 August 2010 – 18 June 2015
- President: Pierre Nkurunziza

Personal details
- Born: Burundi
- Party: CNDD–FDD

Concilie Nibigira is a Burundian politician. She was the former Minister of Information, Communication, Relations with Parliament in Burundi, having been appointed to the position in 2010 by the former president of Burundi, Pierre Nkurunziza. Her term began on 30 August 2010 and ended on 18 June 2015.

Awards and achievements
Preceded by	Minister of Information, Communication, Relations with Parliament of Burundi	Succeeded by
