= Marie Chantal Nijimbere =

Burundian government minister

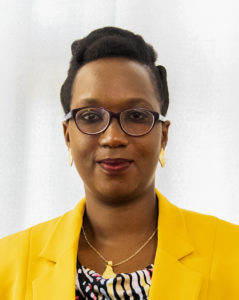

Minister of National Defence and Veterans Affairs
- Incumbent
- Assumed office 5 August 2025

Minister of Commerce, Transport, Industry and Tourism
- In office 9 September 2024 – 5 August 2025
- President: Evariste Ndayishimiye
- Succeeded by: Dr. Hassan Kibeya

Minister of Communication, ICT and Media
- In office 23 June 2020 – 9 September 2024
- President: Evariste Ndayishimiye
- Succeeded by: Léocadie Ndacayisaba

Personal details
- Born: 1983 (age 42–43) Cankuzo, Burundi
- Education: University of Burundi; Mount Kenya University

Marie Chantal Nijimbere (born 1983) is a Burundian politician serving as Minister of National Defence and Veterans Affairs. From 9 September 2024 to 5 August 2025, she served as Minister of Commerce, Transport, Industry and Tourism. Previously, she had served as Minister of Communication, ICT and Media in the Republic of Burundi from 28 June 2020 to 9 September 2024, appointed by the President Evariste Ndayishimiye . She was subsequently replaced by Léocadie Ndacayisaba.

== Background and education ==
Nijimbere was born in 1983 in Cankuzo. She received a bachelor's degree in Economics and Administration from the University of Burundi in 2010 and a master's degree in Business and Administration from Mount Kenya University.

== Career ==
Nijimbere has 10 years of experience in the civil society sector. She worked with the association of scouts and guides of Burundi where she managed finances and accounts, organized national events and supervised young people. From 2010 to 2014 she was in control of the finance of African scouting events. In 2017, she became the accountant of the African Scouting events that was held in that year. In June 2020, she was appointed as the Minister of Communication, ICT and Media by the President of the Republic of Burundi Evariste Ndayishimiye.
