= The East African University =

Coordinates: 01°39′00″S 36°54′02″E

The East African University (TEAU)
- Motto: The Fountain of Knowledge and Character
- Type: Private
- Established: 2010
- Vice-Chancellor: Everett Standa
- Administrative staff: no
- Students: yes
- Location: Kitengela, Kenya
- Campus: Urban

The East African University (TEAU) is a private university in Kenya.

== Location ==
The university main campus is located approximately 10 kilometres (6.2 mi) south of the central business district of the town of Kitengela, Kajiado County, Kenya. This location lies off the Nairobi-Kajiado-Namanga Road, approximately 40 kilometres (25 mi) south of Nairobi, the capital of Kenya and the largest city in that country. The approximate coordinates of the university campus are:1° 39' 0.00"S, +36° 54' 0.00"E (Latitude:-1.6500; Longitude:36.9000). The coordinates are approximate because the university campus does not yet show on most publicly available maps in January 2012.

The university also has another campus located at View Park Towers, Utalii Lane within the CBD (Central Business District) in Nairobi.

== History ==
The idea to start the university was conceived in 2005. In 2006, 100 acres (0.40 km^{2}) of land were acquired in Kitengela, for the purpose of establishing the university. Application was then made to the Commission for University Education for a Tertiary Education Institution License. The license was granted in November 2010 and was handed over to the university officials by the chairman of the commission, Prof. Ezra Maritum.

== Academics Schools ==
As of January 2012, the university maintains the following schools:

- School of Business and Management Studies
- School of Computer Science and Information Technology
- School of Education, Arts & Social Sciences

== Courses ==
Graduate School Courses

- None available as of January 2012

Undergraduate Degree Courses

- Bachelor of Science in Business Management (Accounting)
- Bachelor of Science in Business Management (Sales & Marketing)
- Bachelor of Science in Business Management (Banking & Finance)
- Bachelor of Science in Business Management (Human Resource Management)
- Bachelor of Computer Science and Information Technology
- Bachelor of Education (Arts)
- Bachelor of Business Information Technology

Diploma Courses

- Diploma in Computer Science and IT
- Diploma in Business Information Technology
- Diploma in Business Science with the options
- Diploma in Actuarial Science
- Diploma in Credit Management
- Diploma in Islamic Banking and FINANCE
- Diploma in Procurement and Supplies Management
- Diploma in Co-operative Management
- Diploma in Management of NGOs
- Diploma in Project Planning and Management

Certificate Courses

- Certificate in Science in Computer Science and IT
- Certificate in Business Information Technology

== Affiliation ==
The University of East Africa is affiliated with Kampala University, a multi-campus institution with its main campus located in Ggaba, a southeastern suburb of Kampala, the capital of Uganda and the largest city in that country. Professor Badru Kateregga, the Chairman of the Board of Trustees of TEAU also serves as the Vice Chancellor of Kampala University.

== See also ==
- Education in Kenya
- List of universities in Kenya
- Kajiado
- Kampala University
