= Evelyne Butoyi =

Politician from Burundi

Evelyne Butoyi is a politician from Burundi. Butoyi is Burundi's ambassador to Zambia.
