= Imelde Sabushimike =

Burundian minister

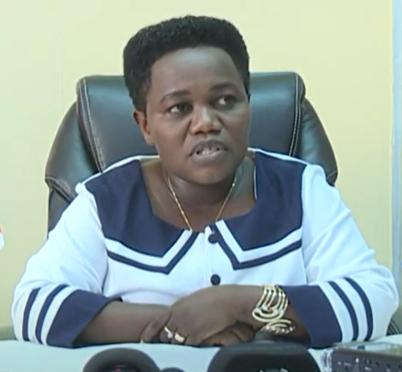
- Sabushimike in 2020

Minister of Human Rights, Social Affairs and Gender
- Incumbent
- Assumed office 28 June 2020
- President: Évariste Ndayishimiye
- Preceded by: Martin Nivyabandi

Imelde Sabushimike is a Burundian politician serving as the Minister of Human Rights, Social Affairs and Gender in Burundi, appointed by the Burundi president, General Evariste Ndayimiyishe. She was the first Twa woman to be part of the Government in Burundi.

== Education and background ==
Sabushimike earned a degree in Economics. She worked with National Commission of Internal Dialogue as a Secretary.

== Career ==
In 2013, Sabushimike worked for an NGO called UNIPROBA (Unissons nous por la promotion des Batwa or unite for the promotion of the Batwa) founded in 2003 created to defend the rights of the Batwa community. She used this medium in helping and improving the life of the Batwa community. It was said that Imelde worked to support an ambitious development and social agenda, including education, job creation, energy etc.
