= Immaculate Ndabaneze =

Former Burundi Minister of Commerce

Burundi Minister of Commerce, Transport, Industry and Tourism
- In office June 2020 – May 2021
- President: Évariste Ndayishimiye

Personal details
- Born: 1972 (age 53–54) Gihanga Commune, Bubanza, Burundi

Immaculate Ndabaneze (born 1972) is a Minister in Burundi. She served as the Minister of Commerce, Transport, Industry and Tourism from June 2020 to May 2021 before being dismissed following embezzlement claims.

== Background and career ==
Ndabaneze is a native of Gihanga Commune in Bubanza Province. She is a trained economist and she utilised her profession for 20 years in the banking industry. She became a politician in 1999 and she was the Chairman of the Standing Committee in charge of Economic Issues, Finance and Budget. She is the Head of the Board of Directors of Tujane Microfinance Bank in Burundi.
