= Jean-Marie Nibirantije =

Burundian politician

Minister of Environment, Territory Management and Public services of Burundi
- In office August 30, 2010 – 18 June 2015
- President: Pierre Nkurunziza

Personal details
- Born: Burundi
- Party: CNDD–FDD

Jean-Marie Nibirantije is a Burundian politician and educator. He was the former Minister of Environment, Territory Management and Public services in Burundi, having been appointed to the position in 2010 by the former president of Burundi, Pierre Nkurunziza. His term began on August 30, 2010.

Awards and achievements
| Preceded by | Minister of Environment, Territory Management and Public services of Burundi | Succeeded by |
