= Clotilde Nizigama =

Burundian politician

Minister of Economy, Finance and Development of Burundi
- In office 16 November 2007 – 2012
- President: Pierre Nkurunziza
- Preceded by: Denise Sinankwa
- Succeeded by: Tabu Abdallah

Personal details
- Born: Burundi
- Party: CNDD–FDD

Clotilde Nizigama is a Burundian politician. Nizigimana was the former Minister of Economy, Finance and Development in Burundi, having been appointed to the position in 2007 by the former president of Burundi, Pierre Nkurunziza. The term began on 14 November 2007 and ended in 2012. She was also governor of the African Development Bank, and vice-general secretary of the CEEAC.

Preceded by Denise Sinankwa	Minister of Economy, Finance and Development of Burundi; 2007-2012	Succeeded by Tabu Abdallah
