= Emmanuel Gikoro =

Burundian politician

Minister of Public Health and HIV/Aids fight of Burundi
- In office 14 November 2007 – 11 August 2013
- President: Pierre Nkurunziza

Personal details
- Born: Burundi
- Party: UPRONA

Emmanuel Gikoro is a Burundian politician. He was the former Minister of Public Health and HIV/Aids fight in Burundi, having been appointed to the position in 2007 by the former president of Burundi, Pierre Nkurunziza. His term began on 14 November 2007.

Awards and achievements
Preceded by	Minister of Public Health and HIV/Aids fight of Burundi	Succeeded by
