= Lucie Nizigama =

Burundian legal scholar and women's rights activist

Lucie Nizigama (1 May 1957 – September 2010) was a Burundian legal scholar and advocate for the rights of women. She died in 2010.

== Biography ==
Nizigama was born on 1 May 1957 in the province of Ruyigi. After the death of her father, her mother was engaged in legal battles with her in-laws and went through lengthy court proceedings to gain access to inherit their family land. Lucie's mother was able to put her through schooling. She had three other siblings. She went on to law school years later, but had to interrupt her course, to resume it in 1998 and finish it in 2001. She then worked as a magistrate and is the first female judge in the rural province of Karuzi. She then opened a law firm in 2002.

The Burundian Civil War enhanced the vulnerability of a large part of the population, so in 2004, Nizigama closed her practice and devoted herself to defending women by practicing legal assistance in the Association of Women Lawyers of Burundi (AFJ). She was also active in the Christian Action for the Abolition of Torture, of which she becomes president in Burundi. She conducted investigations into sexual violence against women. She tried to promote legislative changes on women's rights and reparations for victims, and participated in the draft law of the Truth and Reconciliation Commission of her country. She died in September 2010 after a long illness.
