= Barnabe Mbonimpa =

Burundian politician

Minister at the Presidency in charge of AIDS of Burundi
- In office 14 November 2007 – 11 August 2013
- President: Pierre Nkurunziza

Personal details
- Born: Burundi
- Party: CNDD–FDD

Barnabe Mbonimpa is a Burundian politician and educator. He was the former Minister at the Presidency in charge of AIDS in Burundi, having been appointed to the position in 2007 by the former president of Burundi, Pierre Nkurunziza. His term began on 14 November 2007.

Awards and achievements
Preceded by	Minister at the Presidency in charge of AIDS of Burundi	Succeeded by
