= Euphrasie Bigirimana =

Burundian politician

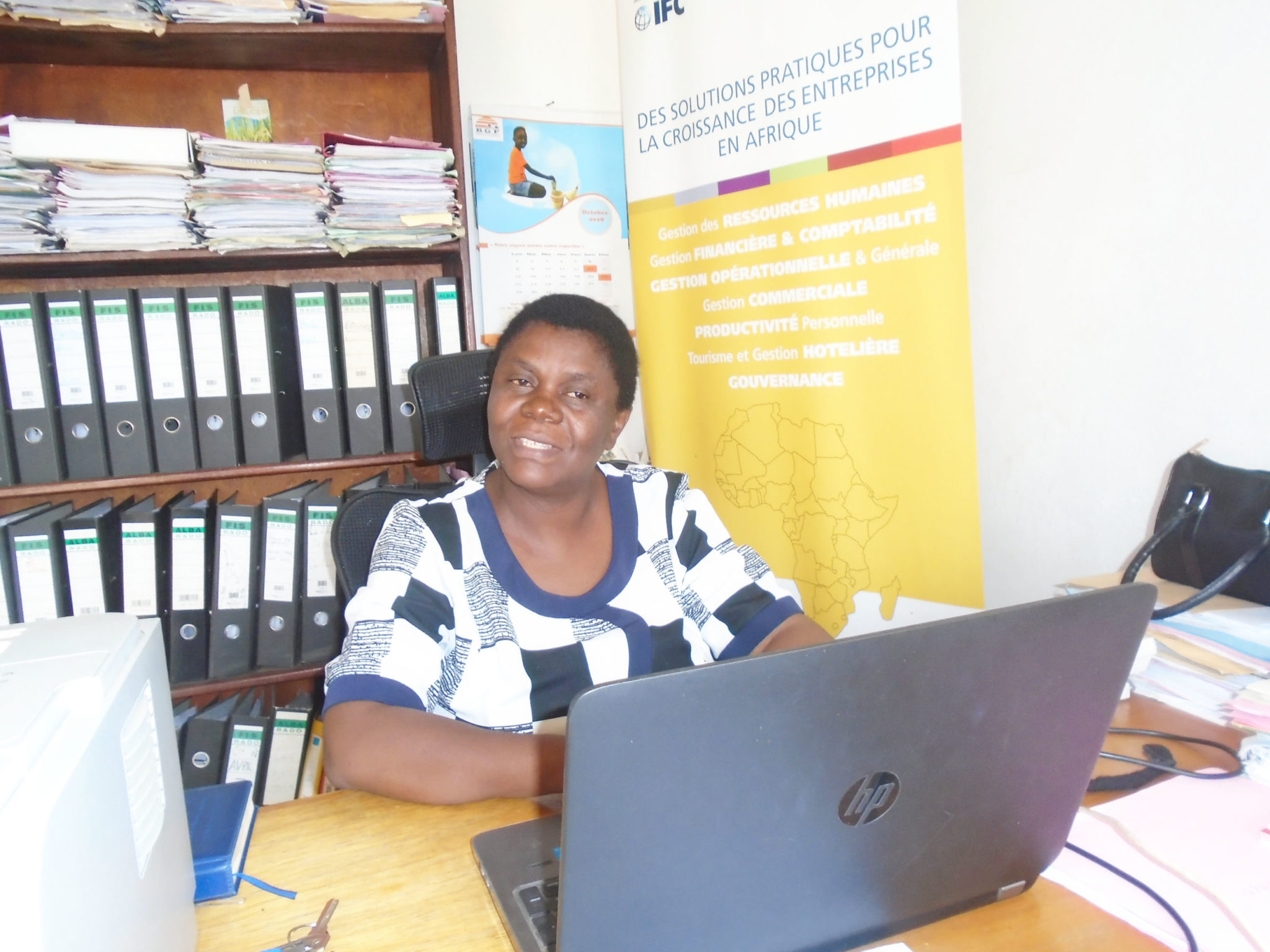

Minister of Commerce, Industry and Tourism of Burundi
- In office 14 November 2007 – 11 August 2013
- President: Pierre Nkurunziza

Personal details
- Born: Burundi
- Party: CNDD–FDD

Euphrasie Bigirimana is a Burundian politician and educator. She is a former Deputy Minister of Commerce, Industry and Tourism in Burundi, having been appointed to the position in 2007 by the former president of Burundi, Pierre Nkurunziza. Her term began on 14 November 2007.

Awards and achievements
Preceded by	Minister of Commerce, Industry and Tourism of Burundi	Succeeded by
