= Martin Nivyabadi =

Burundian politician

Minister of Good Governance, Privatization, General Inspection of the State and Local Administration of Burundi
- In office 14 November 2007 – 11 August 2013
- President: Pierre Nkurunziza

Personal details
- Born: Burundi
- Party: CNDD–FDD

Martin Nivyabadi is a Burundian politician. He was the former Minister of Good Governance, Privatization, General Inspection of the State and Local Administration in Burundi, having been appointed to the position in 2007 by the former president of Burundi, Pierre Nkurunziza. His term began on 14 November 2007.

Awards and achievements
Preceded by	Minister of Good Governance, Privatization, General Inspection of the State and Local Administration of Burundi	Succeeded by
