= Saidi Kibeya =

Burundian politician

Minister of Good Governance, Privatization, General Inspection of the State and Local Administration of Burundi
- In office August 30, 2010 – 18 June 2015
- President: Pierre Nkurunziza

Personal details
- Born: Burundi
- Party: CNDD–FDD

Saidi Kibeya is a Burundian politician and educator. He was the former Minister at the Presidency in charge of Good Governance, Privatization, General Inspection of the State and Local Administration in Burundi, having been appointed to the position in 2010 by the former president of Burundi, Pierre Nkurunziza. His term began on August 30, 2010.

He was later reported to be Minister of Transports and Equipment in 2021.

He is the father of Minister Hassan Kibeya.

Awards and achievements
Preceded by	Minister of Good Governance, Privatization, General Inspection of the State and Local Administration of Burundi	Succeeded by
