= Constitutional Court of Burundi =

- Sentare yubahiriza ibwirizwa shingiro (Kirundi); Cour Constitutionnelle du Burundi (French)
- Coat of arms of Burundi
- Established: 1992; 34 years ago
- Jurisdiction: Burundi
- Location: Avenue des États Unis, Kigobe, Ntahangwa, Bujumbura
- Composition method: Appointed by President after approval by the Senate with at least 4 of the members appointed being career magistrates
- Authorised by: Constitution of Burundi Title VIII Chapter IV
- Judge term length: Eight years, non renewable
- Number of positions: 7 (by Burundian Constitution)
- Website: courconstitutionnelle.gov.bi

President
- Currently: Valentin Bagorikunda
- Since: December 17, 2020; 5 years ago

Vice-President
- Currently: Emmanuel Ntahomvukiye
- Since: December 17, 2020; 5 years ago

The Constitutional Court (Kirundi: Sentare yubahiriza ibwirizwa shingiro, French: Cour constitutionnelle) is the supreme authority on Burundi's constitutional law. The Constitutional Court deals with the interpretation of the Constitution of 2005 and is considered the country's second highest court. In conjunction with the Burundian Supreme Court (Cour Suprême), the Constitutional Court can sit en banc as a High Court of Justice (Haute Cour de Justice) with special prerogatives, such as the power to try an incumbent president. It sits at Bujumbura and its incumbent president is Valentin Bagorikunda.

The court was established in 1992 as the authority on the new constitution adopted the same year. Previously, the Supreme Court had exercised jurisdiction over constitutional questions. In May 2015, the Constitutional Court was called to rule on the legality for a candidate to stand for a third term as president of Burundi. The case occurred against the background of the widespread popular unrest against the government of Pierre Nkurunziza who had held the position since 2005. The court ruled that the Constitution of 2005 did not prohibit a third term, ruling that Nkurunziza's first mandate should not be counted because he had been selected by parliament. The judgment was deeply controversial and was accused of pro-government bias. The court's vice-president, Sylvere Nimpagaritse, fled into exile before the judgment was released, claiming that the government had applied pressure to the judges to decide in favour of three-term presidencies. Nkurunziza subsequently served for a third term and died in 2020 shortly after announcing that he would not stand for a fourth.

List of presidents

Name	Took office	Left office	Notes
Gérard Niyungeko	1992	1996	
The Constitutional Court was abolished and then reorganized	1996	1998	
Domitille Barancira	1998	2006	
Christine Nzeyimana	2007	2013	
Charles Ndagijimana	2013	December 2020	
Valentin Bagorikunda	December 2020	Present	

== See also ==
- Supreme Court of Burundi
