= Venant Kamana =

Burundian politician

Minister of Home Affairs and Communal Development of Burundi
- In office 14 November 2007 – 11 August 2013
- President: Pierre Nkurunziza

Personal details
- Born: Burundi
- Party: CNDD–FDD

Venant Kamana is a Burundian politician and educator. He was the former Minister of Home Affairs and Communal Development in Burundi, having been appointed to the position in 2007 by the former president of Burundi, Pierre Nkurunziza. His term began on 14 November 2007.

Awards and achievements
Preceded by	Minister of Home Affairs and Communal Development of Burundi	Succeeded by
