= Domine Banyankimbona =

Ministers in Burundi

Minister of Justice
- In office 2022–2025
- Preceded by: Jeanine Nibizi
- Succeeded by: Arthémon Katihabwa

Personal details
- Born: 1970 (age 55–56)

Domine Banyankimbona (born in 1970) is a Burundian politician who served as the Minister of Public Service, Labour and Employment in the Republic of Burundi.

== Background and education ==
Banyankimbona was born in 1970 in Bururi Province. She is a member of the Catholic Church. Banyankimbona received a Bachelor’s Degree in Law from Hope University, Nairobi.

== Career ==
Banyankimbona served as the Vice President of the Supreme Court in Burundi and later became President at the Court of Cassation. Thereafter, she became President of the First Section of the Judicial Chamber. Banyankimbona occupied various positions relating to her profession before she became the Minister of Public Service, Labour and Employment appointed by the President of Burundi, Evariste Ndayimiyishe. From 2022 to 2025, she served as the Minister of Justice.
