= Odette Kayitesi =

Burundian politician

Minister of Agriculture and Livestock of Burundi
- In office August 30, 2010 – 18 June 2015
- President: Pierre Nkurunziza

Personal details
- Born: Burundi
- Party: CNDD–FDD

Odette Kayitesi is a Burundian politician and educator. She was the former Minister of Agriculture and Livestock in Burundi, having been appointed to the position in 2010 by the former president of Burundi, Pierre Nkurunziza. Her term began on August 30, 2010.

Awards and achievements
Preceded by	Minister of Agriculture and Livestock of Burundi	Succeeded by
