= University of Burundi =

Public university in Bujumbura, Burundi

- Kaminuza y'Uburundi (Kirundi); Université du Burundi (French)
- Other name: UB
- Former name: Official University of Bujumbura (1964–77)
- Motto: "Le Grenier du savoir au service de la Nation" (Kirundi:'Rumuri rumurikira Abarundi') (lit. 'The Breadbasket of Knowledge at the service of the Nation')
- Type: Public university
- Established: 1964; 62 years ago
- Rector: Dr. Prudence Bararunyeretse
- Academic staff: 496
- Faculty: List: Faculty of Agronomy and Bioengineering (Faculté d'Agronomie et de Bio-Ingénieurie); Faculty of Law (Faculté de Droit); Faculty of Medicine (Faculté de la Médecine); Faculty of Psychology and Educational Science (Faculté de Psychologie et des Sciences de l'Education); Faculty of Economic Sciences and Management (Faculté des Sciences Economiques et de Gestion); Faculty of Letters and Human Sciences (Faculté des Lettres et Sciences Humaine); Faculty of Sciences (Faculté des Sciences); Faculty of Engineering Sciences (Faculté des Sciences de l'Ingénieur)
- Administrative staff: 1200
- Students: 18,500 (2025)
- Location: B.P. 1550, Bujumbura, Burundi; 3°22′44″S 29°23′04″E
- Campus: List; Campus Buhumuza (Buhumuza); Campus Kamenge (Bujumbura); Campus Kiriri (Bujumbura); Campus Mutanga (Bujumbura); Campus Nyamugerera (Cibitoke); Campus Rohero (Bujumbura); Campus Zege (Gitega)
- Website: www.ub.edu.bi
- Location within Burundi

The University of Burundi (Kirundi: Kaminuza y'Uburundi, French: Université du Burundi, UB) is the biggest public university in Burundi, with its main campus located in Bujumbura, Burundi. Founded in 1964, it comprises eight faculties and five institutes and has a student enrollment of approximately 13,000. It is based in three campuses in Bujumbura and a fourth in Gitega. It took its current name in 1977 and is Burundi's only publicly funded university.

== History ==
The origins of the University of Burundi can be traced to the Agronomy Institute of the University of the Belgian Congo and Ruanda-Urundi, founded under Belgian colonial rule. In 1960 this became the Agronomical Institute of Ruanda-Urundi (Institut agronomique du Ruanda-Urundi) and moved to Bujumbura, becoming the country's first major centre of higher education. Under the initiative of the Jesuit missions, three other specialist institutions subsequently emerged in Bujumbura after Burundi's independence in 1962. These institutions were merged to form the Official University of Bujumbura (Université officielle de Bujumbura, or UOB) in January 1964. In 1977, the UOB merged with two vocational institutions to create the University of Burundi (Université du Burundi, or UB).

The Library of the University of Burundi was opened in 1981 and formally dedicated in 1985. It was reported in 1993 to have 150,000 volumes in its collection, making it one of the largest libraries in Burundi.

Teaching at the university has been significantly disrupted by political upheaval elsewhere in Burundi since independence. The Burundian Civil War (1993–2006) created particular problems, as did the accompanying socio-economic crisis which led to strikes, funding problems, and a brain drain of academic staff overseas. On 11–12 June 1995 ethnic Hutu students were massacred at the university by ethnic Tutsi.

Its alumni include Pierre Nkurunziza who served as President of Burundi from 2005 to 2020. He studied physical education and later held a post as assistant lecturer at the university before, as a Hutu, being forced to flee in 1995. His successor, Évariste Ndayishimiye, also studied law at the university before the violence of 1995 but did not complete his studies.

UB is affiliated to the Inter-University Council for East Africa (IUCEA), Regional Universities Forum for Capacity Building in Agriculture (RUFORUM), the Agence universitaire de la Francophonie (AUF), and the Conseil Africain et Malagache pour l'enseignement supérieur (CAMES).

== Schools and institutes ==
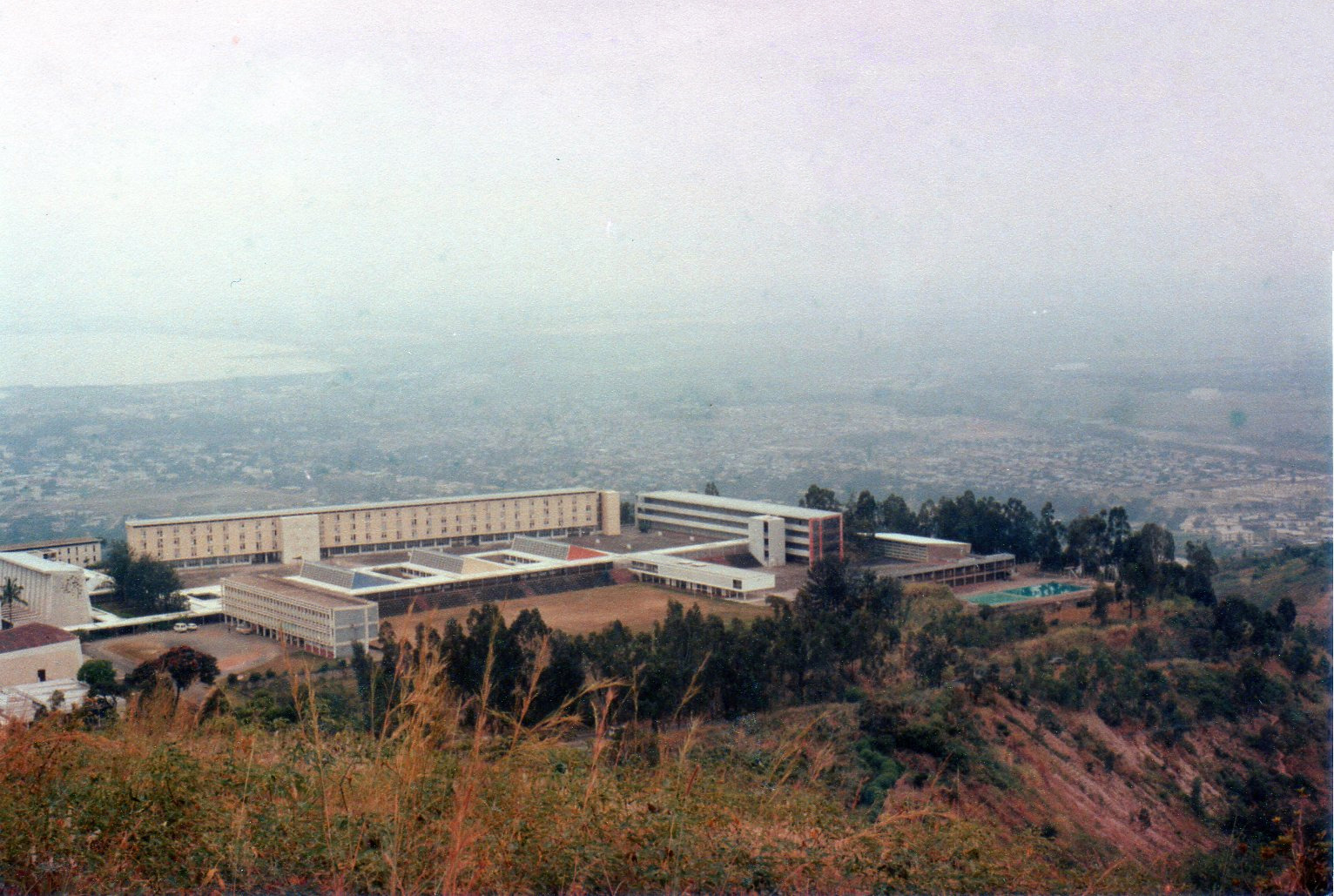
View of the university's buildings in Bujumbura

The university is divided into faculties and institutes which are themselves made up of departments. As of 2018, the university was said to comprise:

=== Faculties ===
- Faculty of Agronomy and Bioengineering (Faculté d'Agronomie et de Bio-Ingénieurie)
- Faculty of Law (Faculté de Droit)
- Faculty of Medicine (Faculté de la Médecine)
- Faculty of Psychology and Educational Science (Faculté de Psychologie et des Sciences de l'Education)
- Faculty of Economic Sciences and Management (Faculté des Sciences Economiques et de Gestion)
- Faculty of Letters and Human Sciences (Faculté des Lettres et Sciences Humaine)
- Faculty of Sciences (Faculté des Sciences)
- Faculty of Engineering Sciences (Faculté des Sciences de l'Ingénieur)

=== Institutes ===
- Confucius Institute for Chinese language (Institut Confucius), affiliated to the international Confucius Institute programme
- Institute of Applied Pedagogy (Institut de Pédagogie appliquée) 'IPA'
- Institute of Physical Education and Sport (Institut d'Education physique et de Sport) 'IEPS'
- Institute of Applied Statistics (Institut des Statistiques appliquées) 'ISTA'
- Higher Institute of Commerce (Institut supérieur de Commerce) 'ISCO'
- Higher Institute of Applied Sciences (Institut Superieur des Sciences Appliquées) 'ISSA'
- Higher Institute of Agriculture Training (Institut Supérieur de Formation Agricole) 'ISFA'
- Institute of Land Administration and Mapping (Institut d'administration et de Cartographie Foncières) 'IACF'

=== Campuses ===
The University of Burundi is currently operates seven campuses:

- Campus Buhumuza (Buhumuza)
- Campus Kamenge (Bujumbura)
- Campus Kiriri (Bujumbura)
- Campus Mutanga (Bujumbura)
- Campus Nyamugerera (Cibitoke)
- Campus Rohero (Bujumbura)
- Campus Zege (Gitega)

== Notable alumni ==
- Denis Mukwege, Nobel Peace Prize winner in 2018
- Domitille Barancira
- Prosper Bazombanza
- Eraste Bigirimana
- Alain-Guillaume Bunyoni, former prime minister of Burundi
- Bernard Busokoza, former vice-president of Burundi
- Zedi Feruzi
- Joseph Gahama
- Mbaranga Gasarabwe
- Sylvie Kinigi
- Mathilde Mukantabana
- Eugénie Musayidire
- Alain Mutabazi
- Évariste Ndayishimiye, president of the Republic of Burundi
- Janvière Ndirahisha
- Jean-Marie Ngendahayo
- Marie Chantal Nijimbere
- Agnès Nindorera
- Emmanuel Niyonkuru
- Gérard Niyungeko
- Pierre Nkurunziza, former president of Burundi
- Léonard Nyangoma
- Agathon Rwasa
- Thérence Sinunguruza
- Ibrahim Uwizeye
- Gaspard Banyankimbona, African Union Commissioner for Education, Science, Technology and Innovation
- Ézechiel Nibigira, President of the Commission of ECCAS
- Gabriel Ntisezerana
