= Sabine Ntakarutimana =

Burundian politician

Minister of Public Health and HIV/Aids fight of Burundi
- In office August 30, 2010 – 18 June 2015
- President: Pierre Nkurunziza
- Preceded by: Dr Emmanuel Gikoro

Personal details
- Born: 28 avril 1968 Burundi
- Party: CNDD–FDD

Sabine Ntakarutimana is a Burundian politician and educator. She was the former Minister of Public Health and HIV/Aids fight in Burundi, having been appointed to the position in 2010 by the former president of Burundi, Pierre Nkurunziza. Her term began on August 30, 2010.

Awards and achievements
Preceded by	Minister of Public Health and HIV/Aids fight of Burundi	Succeeded by
