= Déogratias Nsanganiyumwami =

Ministers in Burundi

Déogratias Nsanganiyumwami (born in 1963) was the Minister of Infrastructures, Equipment and Social Housing in Burundi from 28 June 2020 to 8 September 2022. He was replaced by Dieudonné Dukundane.

== Background and education ==
Nsanganiyumwami was born in 1963 in the province of Rutana Province, Burundi. He earned a Master’s Degree and a Doctorate’s Degree in veterinary medicine from a University in Bulgaria.

== Career ==
Nsanganiyumwami started practicing as a veterinary doctor in a private sector in 1998. Thereafter in 2002, he was employed as Provincial Veterinary Doctor in the Ministry of Agriculture and Livestock. Nsanganiyumwami later became the Head of the Department of Animal Health in Burundi.
