= Else Nizigama Ntamagiro =

Burundian diplomat (born 1972)

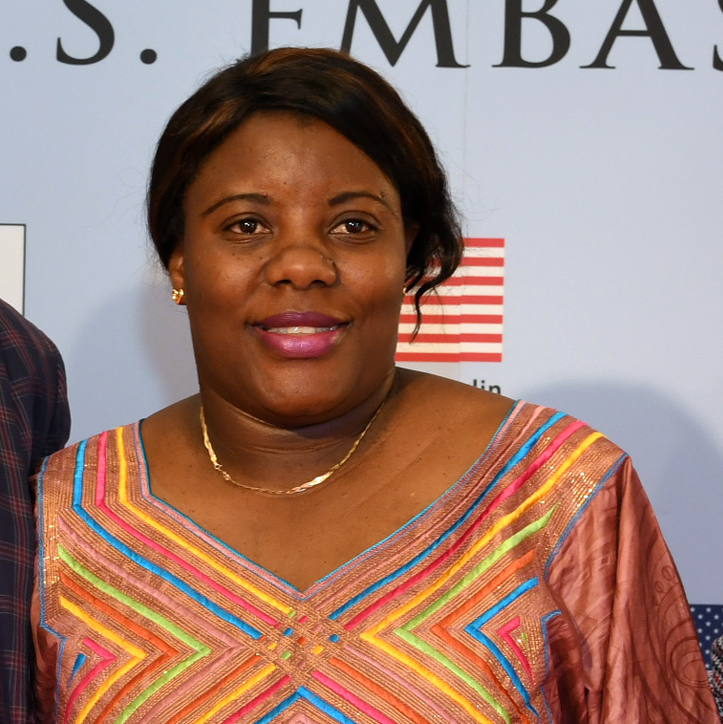
- Else Nizigama Ntamagiro in July 2018

Ambassador to Germany
- In office July 2016 – June 2021
- Succeeded by: Appolonie Nibona

Personal details
- Born: 15 November 1972 (age 53) Burundi
- Education: UCLouvain

Else Nizigama Ntamagiro (born 15 November 1972) is a Burundian diplomat and foreign policy advisor to President Évariste Ndayishimiye. She was her country's ambassador to Berlin from July 2016 to June 2021. She previously served as ambassador to other countries including the Holy See.

== Career ==
Else Nizigama Ntamagiro studied public administration and political science at the University of Bukavu (DR Congo) and received a master's degree in political science and international relations from the Université catholique de Louvain (UCL) in Belgium.

After joining the diplomatic service, Ntamagiro took on advisory roles in the Department for International Organizations at the Ministry of Foreign Affairs in 2002. In 2009, she became First Counselor at the Embassy in the Democratic Republic of the Congo. Two years later, she was appointed Chargée d'affaires at the Embassy in Canada. In 2014, she was appointed Ambassador of Burundi to Russia and Georgia. Two years later, she swapped posts with the Ambassador to Berlin Edouard Bizimana.

Else Nizigama Ntamagiro was accredited as Ambassador Extraordinary and Plenipotentiary of the Republic of Burundi to Germany on 6 July 2016. In December 2016, Ntamagiro received secondary accreditations for the Holy See and in January 2018 for Austria and Slovakia. She has also been Permanent Representative (Ständige Vertretung) to UNIDO in Vienna since June 2017.

Appolonie Nibona, her successor in Berlin, handed over her credentials on 21 June 2021. She was later appointed Head of the Office for Diplomatic Affairs and Cooperation at the Presidency of the Republic of Burundi.
