= Gabriel Nizigama =

Burundian Police General

General Gabriel Nizigama is a Burundian police general who was the chief police commissioner and later served as the Burundian security minister during the presidency of Pierre Nkurunziza. In 2018, he was appointed Chancellor of the National Orders of the Republic of Burundi by Decree No. 100/0146 of 2018.
