= Gaspard Banyankimbona =

Burundian politician

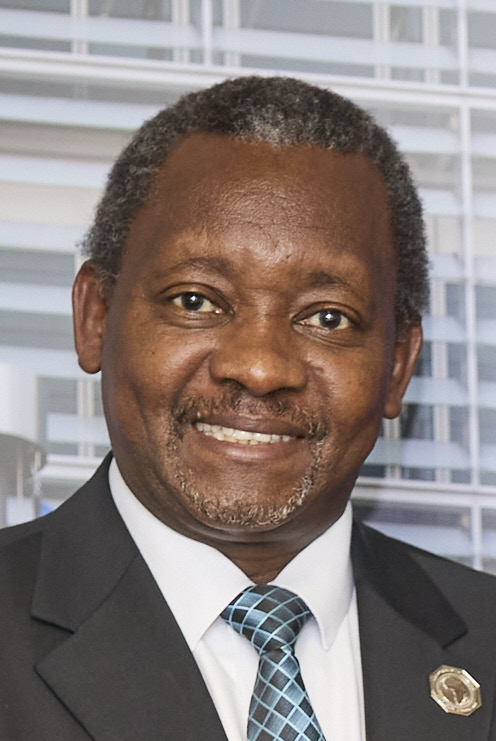
- Banyankimbona in 2026

Commissioner for Education, Science, Technology and Innovation, African Union
- Incumbent
- Assumed office 15 July 2025

Executive Secretary of the Inter-University Council for East Africa
- In office April 2021 – 1 October 2025
- Leader: Veronica Nduva (2024- now); Peter Mathuki (2021-2024)
- Preceded by: Alexandre Lyambabaje
- Succeeded by: Idris A. Rai (Acting Secretary)

Minister of National Education and Scientific Research of Burundi
- In office 28 June 2020 – March 2021
- President: Évariste Ndayishimiye
- Succeeded by: François Havyarimana

Minister of Higher Education and Scientific Research
- In office April 2018 – 28 June 2020
- President: Pierre Nkurunziza
- Succeeded by: himself

Chancellor of the University of Burundi
- In office December 2014 – April 2018
- President: Pierre Nkurunziza
- Succeeded by: François Havyarimana

Permanent Secretary, Ministry of Higher Education and Scientific Research
- In office May 2013 – December 2014
- President: Pierre Nkurunziza

Head of the department Biology of the University of Burundi
- In office December 2012 – May 2013
- President: Pierre Nkurunziza

Personal details
- Born: Burundi
- Party: CNDD–FDD
- Education: Katholieke Universiteit Leuven(PhD); University of Liège (Masters); University of Burundi (Bachelor)

Gaspard Banyankimbona is a Burundian politician. He is the current African Union Commissioner for Education, Science, Technology and Innovation (ESTI) since October 2025.

He previously served as executive secretary for Inter-University Council for East Africa from April 2021 to October 2025. He took office on 13 April 2021 succeeding former executive secretary Alexandre Lyambabaje whose tenure ended in August 2020.

He previously held the position of Minister of Education and Scientific Research in Burundi, having been appointed to the position in 2018 until June 2020 by former president of Burundi, Pierre Nkurunziza and later on reappointed to the position by the current president of Burundi, Évariste Ndayishimiye.

His term under Évariste Ndayishimiye's government began on 28 June 2020 and ended in April 2021.

He also was the chancellor of the University of Burundi from December 2014 to April 2018.

Awards and achievements
| Preceded by | Minister of Education and Scientific Research of Burundi | Succeeded by |
