= Vénérand Bakevyumusaya =

Burundian politician

Vénérand Bakevyumusaya is a Burundian politician and diplomat. Bakevyumusaya was the foreign minister from 1995–1996, ambassador to France from 1998–2002, and principal counselor to the President from 2002–2003. He also served as a permanent representative to UNESCO. He was Minister of Regional Integration and East African Community Affairs from November 2007 to January 2009, and was (starting January 2009) Minister of Information, Communication, and Relations with Parliament.
