= Jeanine Nibizi =

Burundian politician

Minister of Justice
- In office 2020–2022
- Preceded by: Aimée Laurentine Kanyana
- Succeeded by: Domine Banyankimbona

Jeanine Nibizi is a Burundian politician who served as Minister of Justice and Keeper of the Government Seals from 2020 to 2022. Before taking up that position, she served as Gitega Prison Director.
