= Alain-Guillaume Bunyoni =

Burundian politician

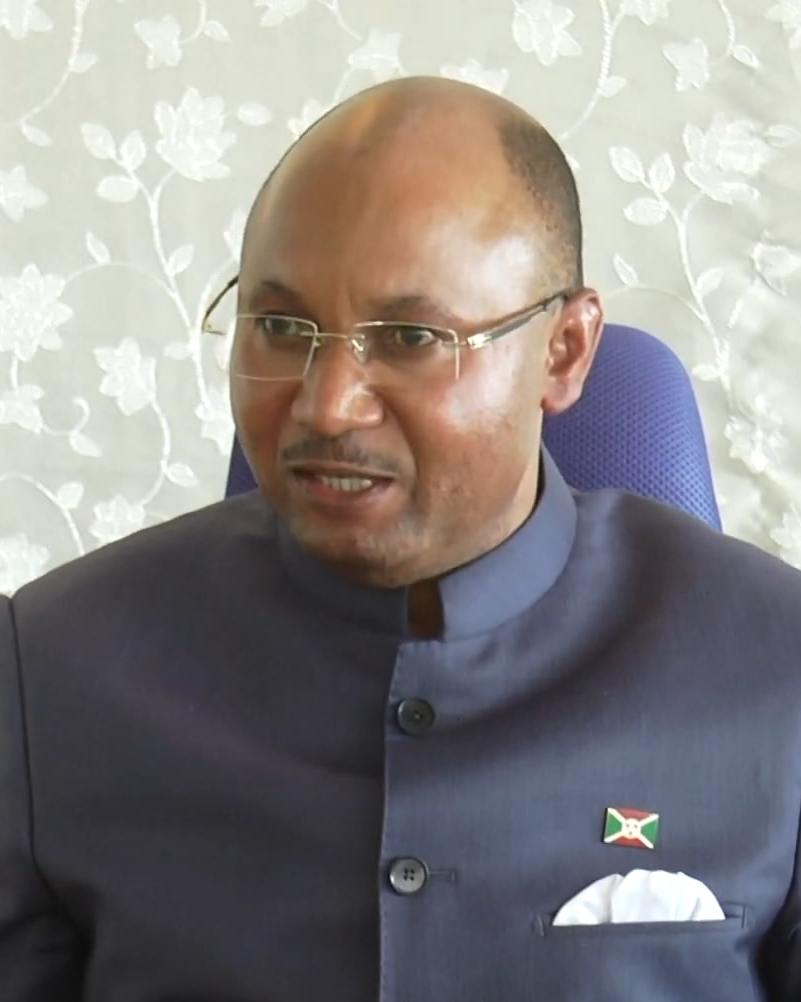
- Bunyoni in January 2020

8th Prime Minister of Burundi
- In office 24 June 2020 – 7 September 2022
- President: Évariste Ndayishimiye
- Preceded by: Pascal-Firmin Ndimira (1998)
- Succeeded by: Gervais Ndirakobuca

Personal details
- Born: 23 April 1972 (age 54) Kanyosha, Bujumbura Mairie Province, Burundi
- Party: CNDD-FDD
- Education: University of Burundi

Alain-Guillaume Bunyoni (born 23 April 1972) is a Burundian politician and police general who was Prime Minister of Burundi from 24 June 2020 to 7 September 2022. Before that, from 2015 until 2020, he served as Minister of Internal Security in the Cabinet of Burundi. From 2015 till 2022, he was considered to be the de facto number two in the country.

== Background and education ==
Bunyoni was born on 23 April 1972 in the commune of Kanyosha, in Bujumbura Mairie Province. He was educated at the University of Burundi. He graduated and appeared on the list of graduates in 1994, but he did not attend the ceremony. Instead, he joined the fighting that broke out, following the assassination of President Melchior Ndadaye. He was a member of the Forces for the Defense of Democracy fighting force.

== Political career ==
In 2003, the National Council for the Defense of Democracy – Forces for the Defense of Democracy political coalition reached a ceasefire with the other combatants in the Burundian Civil War. From 2004 until 2005, Bunyoni served as the equivalent of the Inspector General of the new police force. From 2005 until 2007, he served as the Chief of Police of Burundi.

Between 2007 and 2011, Bunyoni served as the Minister of Internal Security, a role he returned to between 2015 until 2020. From 2011 until 2014, Alain-Guillaume Bunyoni was appointed head of the Office of the Minister of Civil Affairs in the Office of the President.

On 23 June 2020, the Parliament of Burundi voted to accept the nomination of Bunyoni, by Évariste Ndayishimiye, the newly elected president, as the 8th prime minister of Burundi. He was sworn into office on 24 June 2020 by the president of Burundi.

President Ndayishimiye sacked Bunyoni after accusing unnamed people of plotting a coup against him. On 21 April 2023, Bunyoni was arrested. The Justice ministry shared a document on 23 April 2023, signed by Prosecutor General Sylvestre Nyandwi which informed of his arrest. Burundi's national human rights commission informed that Bunyoni has not been subject to any form of persecution.

Bunyoni has been under international sanctions for his alleged role in being complicit in human rights violations carried out during the violence sparked by then-President Pierre Nkurunziza's decision to run for a third term.

On 27 June 2024, the Supreme Court of Burundi confirmed on appeal the life sentence against Bunyoni.

On 11 March 2026, Bunyoni, who had been detained in a hospital in Gitega due to ill health, was granted provisional release on medical grounds.

== Other considerations ==
In addition to the above responsibilities, Bunyoni was in charge of various international security responsibilities and in 2007 he was one of the United Nations envoys who was in charge of promoting peace and security. He also chaired the East African Police Committees (OCCPAE) Committee on Interpol.

== See also ==
- Parliament of Burundi
- Cabinet of Burundi
- Provinces of Burundi

Political offices
Preceded by Position abolished (1998–2020)	Prime Minister of Burundi; 2020–2022	Succeeded by Gervais Ndirakobuca
