= Évariste Ndayishimiye =

President of Burundi since 2020

His Excellency Évariste Ndayishimiye
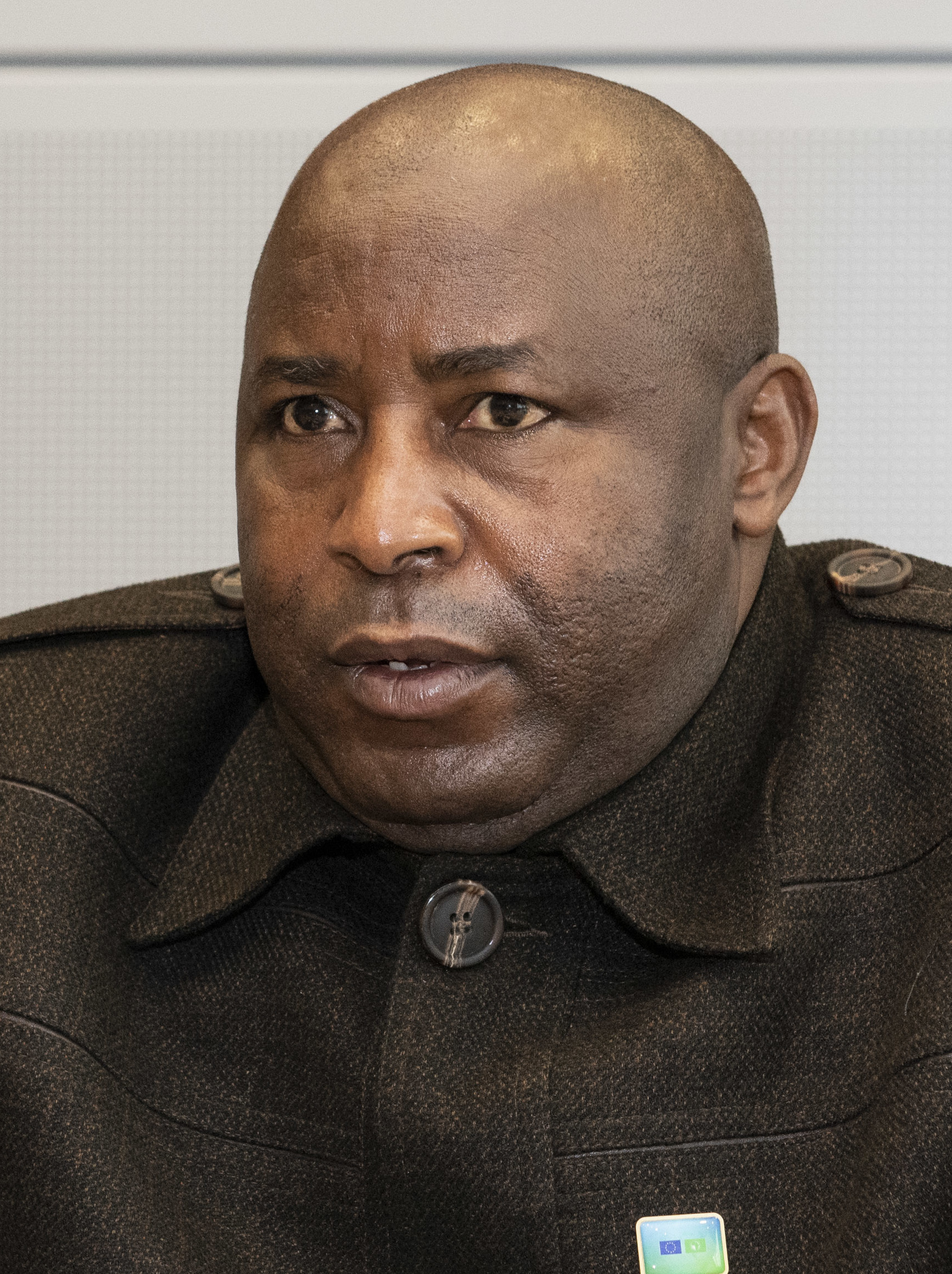
- Ndayishimiye in 2022

10th President of Burundi
- Incumbent
- Assumed office 18 June 2020
- Prime Minister: Alain-Guillaume Bunyoni; Gervais Ndirakobuca; Nestor Ntahontuye
- Vice President: Prosper Bazombanza
- Preceded by: Pierre Nkurunziza

Chairperson of the African Union
- Incumbent
- Assumed office 15 February 2026
- Preceded by: João Lourenço

First Vice Chairperson of the African Union
- In office 15 February 2025 – 15 February 2026
- Chairperson: João Lourenço
- Preceded by: João Lourenço

Personal details
- Born: 17 June 1968 (age 58) Giheta, Gitega Province, Burundi
- Party: CNDD–FDD
- Spouse: Ndayubaha Angeline Ndayishimiye
- Children: 6
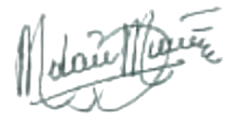
- Signature

Military service
- Allegiance: Burundi
- Branch: Burundi National Defence Force
- Rank: Major General

Évariste Ndayishimiye (born 17 June 1968) is a Burundian general and politician who has served as the tenth President of Burundi since 18 June 2020 and as the chairperson of the African Union since February 2026. He became involved in the rebel National Council for the Defense of Democracy – Forces for the Defense of Democracy during the Burundian Civil War and rose up the ranks of its militia. At the end of the conflict, he entered the Burundian Army and held a number of political offices under the auspices of President Pierre Nkurunziza. Nkurunziza endorsed Ndayishimiye as his successor ahead of the 2020 elections which he won with a large majority.

== Biography ==
Évariste Ndayishimiye was born on 17 June 1968 at Musama, Kabanga Zone in Giheta, Gitega Province in Burundi. He is reported to be a "fervent" Catholic. He began studies in law at the University of Burundi (UB) but was still studying in 1995 when Hutu students were massacred as part of the inter-ethnic violence which accompanied the Burundian Civil War (1993–2005). He fled and joined the moderate rebel National Council for the Defense of Democracy – Forces for the Defense of Democracy (Conseil National Pour la Défense de la Démocratie – Forces pour la Défense de la Démocratie, CNDD–FDD) which drew its support predominantly from ethnic Hutu. Rising up the ranks of the group during the civil war, he presided over its militia and military activities. He gained the nickname "Neva".

A series of agreements in 2003 paved the way for the CNDD–FDD to enter national politics as a political party. Ndayishimiye became deputy chief of staff of the Burundian Army. In 2005, the CNDD–FDD came to power under the leadership of Pierre Nkurunziza whose background was similar and who had also fled UB in 1995. Ndayishimiye served as Minister of the Interior and Public Security from 2006 to 2007 before becoming the personal military aide (chef de cabinet militaire) to Nkurunziza. He held this post until 2014. Alongside his office, he studied at Wisdom University of Africa and gained a degree in 2014. He also chaired the Burundi National Olympic Committee for much of this period.

After rising opposition, Nkurunziza announced in 2018 that he would not stand for a fourth term as president in 2020. Ndayishimiye was the candidate he endorsed as his replacement in the CNDD–FDD and was considered to be a "close ally". It had been reported that Nkurunziza "wanted to run the country from behind the scenes", using Ndayishimiye as a puppet ruler after his resignation. However, it was also noted that Ndayishimiye may have been chosen as a compromise between Nkurunziza and other CNDD–FDD "generals" determined to ensure that a Civil War veteran retained control. Ndayishimiye was "not associated with the worst abuses" under Nkurunziza and was reported to be the most "open" and "honest" candidate within the CNDD–FDD.

Ndayishimiye won elections held in May 2020, winning 68 percent of the national vote. However, the fairness of the poll was widely questioned and it occurred in the middle of the COVID-19 pandemic in Burundi. Nkurunziza died unexpectedly on 8 June 2020. Since Ndayishimiye had already won the elections, the Constitutional Court accelerated his inauguration as president. He was installed at a ceremony in Gitega on 18 June 2020, two months ahead of schedule.

== Presidency ==
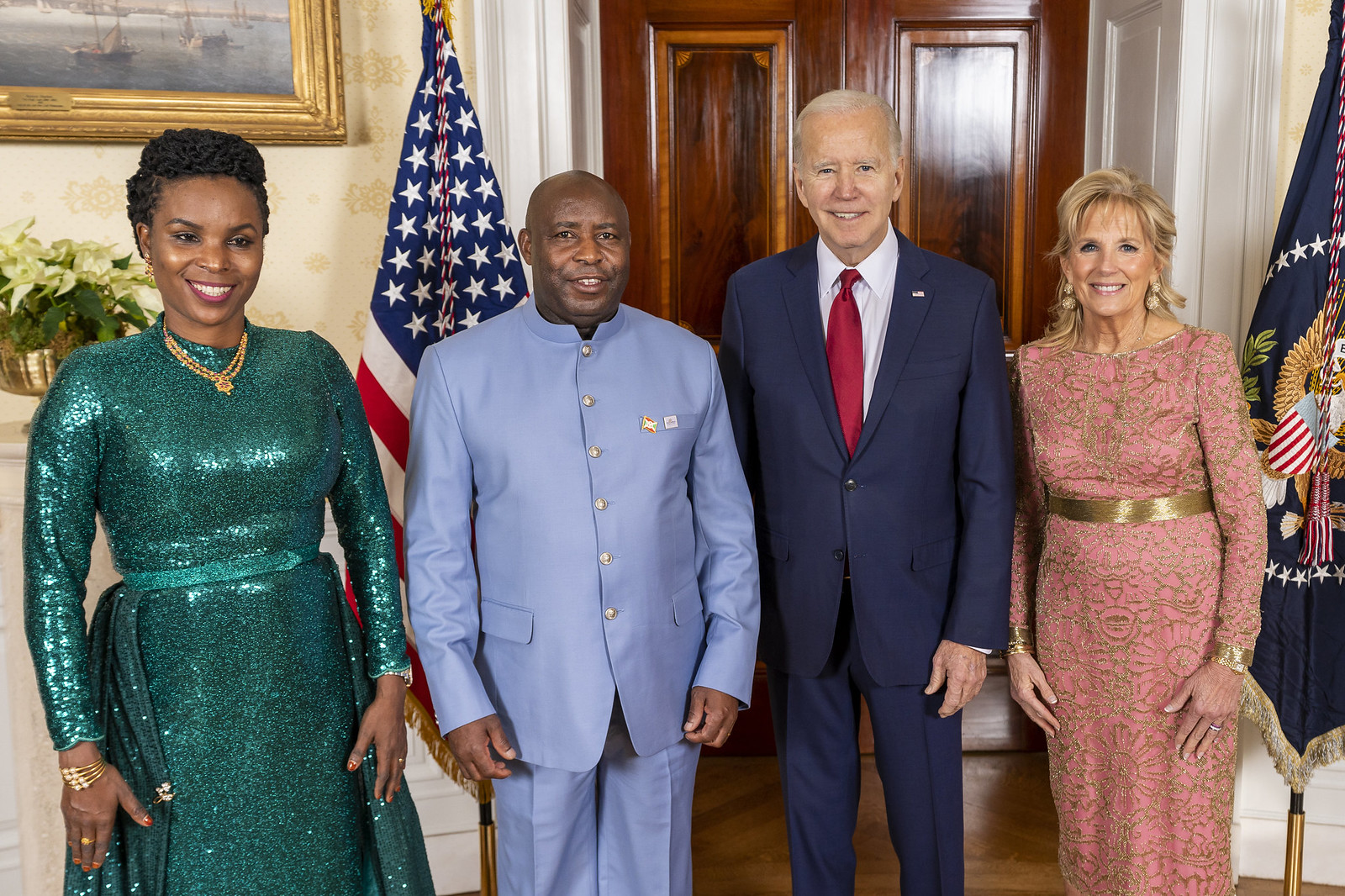
Ndayishimiye with President Joe Biden, Jill Biden, and Angeline Ndayishimiye in late 2022

Ndayishimiye began his seven-year term on 18 June 2020 and announced his first cabinet on 28 June 2020. He reduced the number of cabinet ministers from 21 to 15 and mainly nominated ex-regime hardliners to take up key positions. Ndayishimiye's tenure has been noted to have been less isolationist than his predecessor Nkurunziza's, with Ndayishimiye having made four state visits, including a five-day trip to Equatorial Guinea, and also accommodated a state visit by the President of Ethiopia during his first ten months in office.

Initially, Ndayishimiye was more active than his predecessor in pursuing a stronger response to the COVID-19 pandemic. He called the virus the nation's "worst enemy" shortly after taking office. In January 2021, he closed national borders, having previously issued a statement which said that anyone bringing COVID-19 into Burundi would be treated as "people bringing weapons to kill Burundians". Burundi nonetheless joined Tanzania in February 2021 in being the only African nations to reject vaccines from the COVAX scheme. Health minister Thaddée Ndikumana stated that "since more than 95% of patients are recovering, we estimate that the vaccines are not yet necessary". Through most of 2021, Burundi apparently made no efforts to procure vaccines—one of only three countries to fail to take this step. However, in October 2021, the Burundian government announced that it had received delivery of 500,000 doses of the Chinese Sinopharm BIBP vaccine.

In December 2022, he attended the United States–Africa Leaders Summit 2022 in Washington, D.C. hosted by US President Joe Biden.

In July 2023, he attended the 2023 Russia–Africa Summit in Saint Petersburg and met with President of Russia Vladimir Putin. In the same month, he attended the opening ceremony of the 2021 Summer World University Games held in Chengdu, China, where on the sidelines of it, he met with General Secretary of the Chinese Communist Party Xi Jinping.

Ndayishimiye with Russian President Vladimir Putin at the 2026 Russia–Africa Summit in Moscow, 28 October 2026

In December 2023, responding to a reporter's question on Western countries pushing for LGBT rights to be respected, Ndayishimiye stated the homosexuals should be stoned en masse, and that to do so would not be a crime. In August 2024, in an Amnesty International report, Amnesty International denounced acts of “intimidation, harassment, arbitrary arrests and detentions” targeting activists, journalists and others by the government of Évariste Ndayishimiye. Since 2024 he advocates for private and foreign investment in the tourism branch.

On 17 July 2025, Ndayishimiye was designated by the African Union as its special envoy to the Sahel region.

In February 2026, during the 39th Ordinary Session of the African Union Assembly in Addis Ababa, Ndayishimiye was elected Chairperson for the year 2026.

Political offices
Preceded by Pierre Nkurunziza	President of Burundi; 2020–present	Incumbent
