= List of Tutsis =

This is a list of notable Tutsis.

== Monarchs ==
=== Kings of Rwanda ===
- Ruganzu I ex king of Rwanda – 1438–1482
- Cyirima I ex king of Rwanda – 1482–1506
- Kigeli I ex king of Rwanda – 1506–1528
- Mibabwe I ex king of Rwanda – 1528–1552
- Yuhi I ex king of Rwanda – 1552–1576
- Ndahiro II ex king of Rwanda – 1576–1600
- Ruganzu II ex king of Rwanda – 1600–1624
- Mutara I ex king of Rwanda – 1624–1648
- Kigeli II ex king of Rwanda – 1648–1672
- Mibambwe II ex king of Rwanda – 1672–1696
- Yuhi II of Rwanda ex king of Rwanda – 1696–1720
- Karemeera ex king of Rwanda – 1720–1744
- Cyirima II ex king of Rwanda – 1744–1768
- Kigeli III ex king of Rwanda – 1768–1792
- Mibabwe III ex king of Rwanda – 1792–1797
- Yuhi III ex king of Rwanda – 1797–1830
- Mutara II ex king of Rwanda – 1830–1853
- Kigeli IV ex king of Rwanda – 1853–1895
- Mibambwe IV ex king of Rwanda – 1895–1896
- Yuhi IV ex king of Rwanda – 1896–1931
- Mutara III ex king of Rwanda – 1931 1959
- Kigeli V ex king of Rwanda – 1959–1961

==== Queens of Rwanda ====
- Rosalie Gicanda queen of Rwanda

=== Kings of Burundi ===
- Ntare III Rushatsi, ex king of Burundi – 1680–1709
- Mwezi III Ndagushimiye, ex king of Burundi – 1709–1739
- Mutaga III Senyamwiza Mutamo, ex king of Burundi – 1739–1767
- Mwambutsa III Syarushambo Butama, ex king of Burundi – 1767–1796
- Mwambutsa III Mbariza – 1850–1884
- Ntare IV Rutaganzwa Rugamba, ex king of Burundi – 1884–1890
- Mwezi IV Gisabo, ex king of Burundi – 1908–1915
- Mwezi IV Gisabo, ex king of Burundi – 1915–1916
- Mwezi IV Gisabo, ex king of Burundi – 1916–1922
- Mutaga IV Mbikije, ex king of Burundi – 1922–1946
- Mwambutsa IV Baniriceng, ex king of Burundi – 1962–1966
- Ntare V Ndizeye, ex king of Burundi – 1966–1966

== Politicians ==
=== National leaders ===
==== Presidents of Rwanda ====
- Paul Kagame, current President of Rwanda, he previously commanded the rebel force that ended the 1994 Genocide against Tutsi in Rwanda.

==== Presidents of Burundi ====
- Michel Micombero, former president of Burundi − 1940–1983
- Jean-Baptiste Bagaza, former president of Burundi – born 1946
- Pierre Buyoya, former president of Burundi – born 1949

===== Vice Presidents of Burundi =====
- Mathias Sinamenye, 2nd vice president of Burundi
- Alphonse-Marie Kadege, 4th vice president of Burundi
- Frédéric Ngenzebuhoro 5th vice president of Burundi
- Martin Nduwimana, 6th vice president of Burundi – born 1958

==== Prime Ministers of Burundi ====
- Sylvie Kinigi, former prime minister of Burundi and acting president of Burundi – born 1952
- Louis Rwagasore, former prime minister of Burundi – 1932–1961
- Léopold Biha, former prime minister of Burundi
- Anatole Kanyenkiko, former prime minister of Burundi – born 1952
- Antoine Nduwayo, former prime minister of Burundi – born 1942

==== Vice President of Democratic Republic of Congo ====
- Azarias Ruberwa, former Vice President of the Democratic Republic of Congo – born 1964

=== Other politicians ===
- James Kabarebe (born 1959), Rwandan military officer who has served as a Senior Presidential Adviser on security matters in the government of Rwanda and the Rwandan Minister of Defence.
- Lando Ndasingwa, Rwandan politician, murdered in the Genocide against Tutsi in 1994
- Louise Mushikiwabo, fourth and current Secretary General of Organisation internationale de la Francophonie. She previously served as the Minister of Foreign Affairs and Cooperation of Rwanda.

== Athletes ==
- Gaël Bigirimana
- Saido Berahino
- Yannick Mukunzi

== Others ==
- Sonia Rolland, actress, mother tutsi, father French – born 1981
- Stromae, Belgian musician, rapper and singer-songwriter.
- Benjamin Sehene, Rwandian author, lives in Paris – born 1959
- Immaculée Ilibagiza, Rwandan American author and Rwandan Genocide survivor.
- Scholastique Mukasonga, writer, author of Our Lady of the Nile
- Yolande Mukagasana (born September 6, 1954), Rwandan writer writing in French.
- Ange Kagame, only daughter of Paul Kagame, current president of Rwanda.
