= Burundi–Rwanda relations =

Bilateral relations

- Burundi: Rwanda

Diplomatic mission
- Embassy of Burundi, Kigali: Embassy of Rwanda, Bujumbura

Relations between Burundi and Rwanda have existed for at least as long as the states themselves. Before contact with Europeans, Rwanda and Burundi were kingdoms (primarily inhabited by Hutu, Tutsi and Twa) competing to gain control over nearby territory. In the 1880s, the two kingdoms were placed under colonial authority, first by Germany, and then by Belgium after 1919.

Since regaining their independence in the 1960s, the crises and political developments of both nations have had profound impacts on each other. Bilateral relations between Burundi and Rwanda have ranged from being very friendly to very hostile, and are regularly shaped by the relations between Hutu and Tutsi in general.

== Early relations (pre-1961) ==
=== Pre-colonial relations ===
The lands constituting what are now Rwanda and Burundi were first inhabited by ancestors of the Twa, arriving in the area between 8000 and 3000 BCE. Later on (between 700 BCE and 1500 CE), Bantu peoples also migrated into the region. The exact nature of the origins of Hutu and Tutsi are a matter of dispute.

Regional clans (ubwoko) eventually grew into eight kingdoms by 1700, with the Kingdom of Burundi (or Urundi) and Kingdom of Rwanda being among them. According to Kanyaru traditions, the family and associates of the first king of Burundi – Ntare I – were related to Rwanda's royal family, although this is not universally agreed upon. Around the early-to-mid 19th century, Rwanda and Burundi engaged in the conquering and annexing of smaller surrounding kingdoms, reaching their greatest territorial extent.

=== Colonial era ===
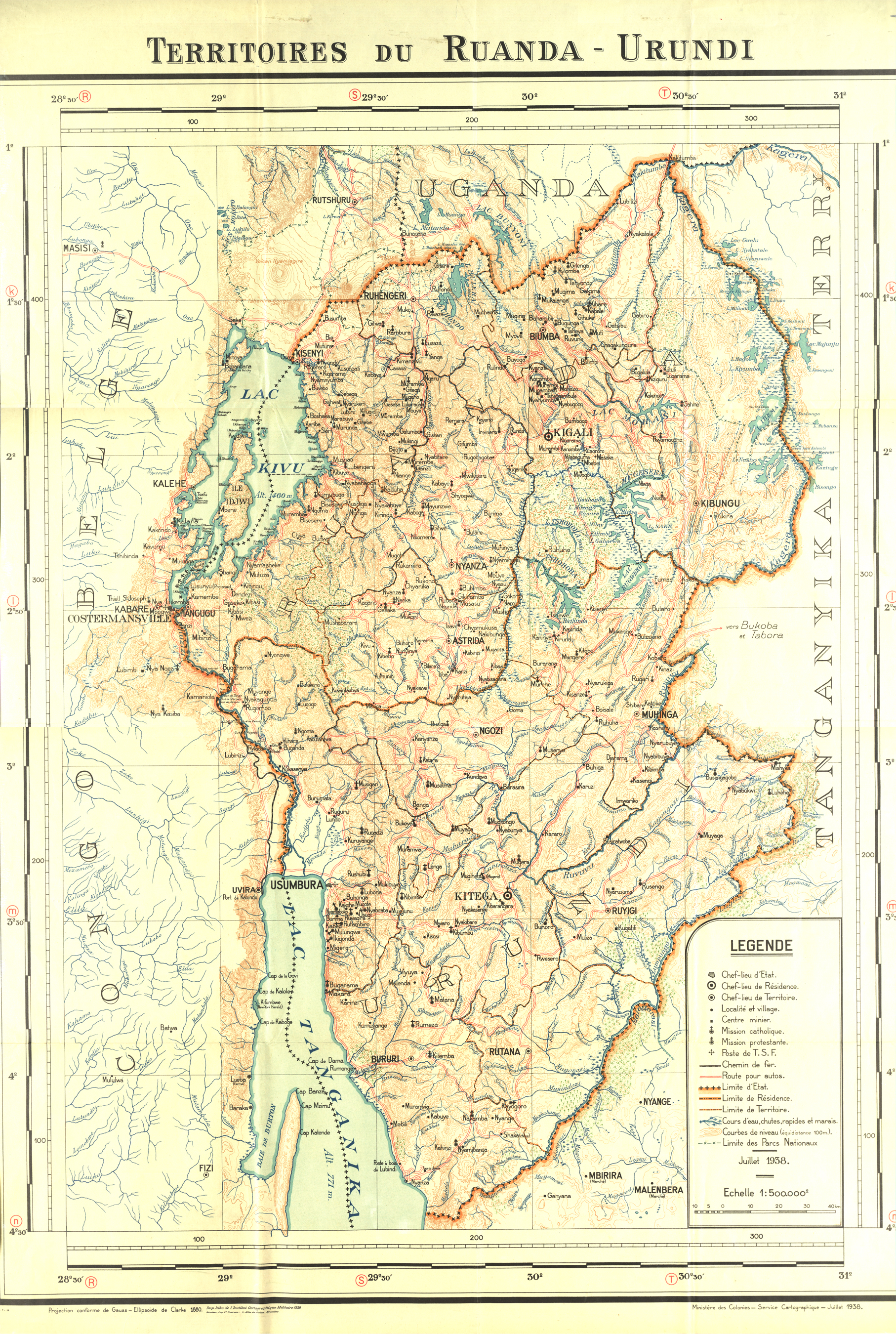
French language map of Ruanda-Urundi, c. 1929–1938

Both Rwanda and Burundi were assigned to the German Empire in the Berlin Conference of 1884–85. Germany did not rule over the kingdoms themselves, but instead chose to rule indirectly through their monarchies, making them the westernmost part of the German East Africa colony. Belgian forces later took control of the kingdoms during World War I, subsequently making them Belgian colonies in a 1919 League of Nations mandate named Ruanda-Urundi.

Although Belgium initially continued the German method of government through the monarchy, in 1926, it began a policy of direct colonial rule in line with norms in the Belgian Congo. Reforms included simplifying the complex three-chieftain system, so one chief (usually Tutsi) instead of three (typically split between Tutsi and Hutu) ruled a local area. Belgian reforms also extended uburetwa (forced labour by Hutu for Tutsi chiefs) to individuals, not just communities, and to regions not previously covered by the system. Tutsi chiefs began a process of land reform with Belgian support; grazing areas traditionally controlled by Hutu collectives were seized by Tutsi and privatised with minimal compensation.

Ruanda-Urundi was devastated by a famine during World War II; a combination of drought and the trade policies of colonial authorities caused between 36,000 and 50,000 people to die in 1943–1944, with hundreds of thousands more fleeing to neighbouring areas.

== Cold War relations (1961–1990) ==
=== Impact of the Rwandan Revolution ===
During and after the Rwandan Revolution, hundreds of thousands of Tutsi fled Rwanda to neighbouring countries, including roughly 25,000 who left for Burundi. Although Rwanda had shifted from being a Tutsi-led monarchy to a Hutu-dominated republic by 1961, Burundi had retained its Tutsi monarchy, and was the country most welcoming to the refugees. Many refugees wished to return to Rwanda, with some aspiring to overthrow the new government.

==== Rebel attacks and reprisal killings ====
The first attempt by Tutsi rebels in Burundi to invade Rwanda was made on 25 November 1963, with approximately 1,500 refugees from across Burundi attempting to move towards the Rwandan border. Upon learning of this, United Nations Commission on Human Rights (UNCHR) Representative in Bujumbura Jacques Cuenod, along with a group of Protestant missionaries, alerted the Burundian government and tried to persuade them to stop the attack. After some hesitation, Burundi sent the gendarmerie to disarm the refugees and return them to their camps. One refugee later told UNCHR official Francois Preziosi that François Rukeba, the Rwandan government-in-exile's Minister of Defence, had ordered the attack after a meeting in Bujumbura, during which Tutsi rebel leaders from other countries expressed their opposition.

By early December 1963, the attitude of the Burundian authorities towards forestalling rebel attacks on Rwanda changed, as a meeting between Rwandan and Burundian delegates in Gisenyi – intended to resolve outstanding issues regarding the dissolution of the Rwanda-Burundi monetary and customs union – fell apart due to disagreements. Burundian Vice Prime Minister Pié Masumbuko told a Rwandan official, "Recently we have arrested people who were about to attack you and now you decide to sever economic relations with us. Therefore you do not want collaboration."

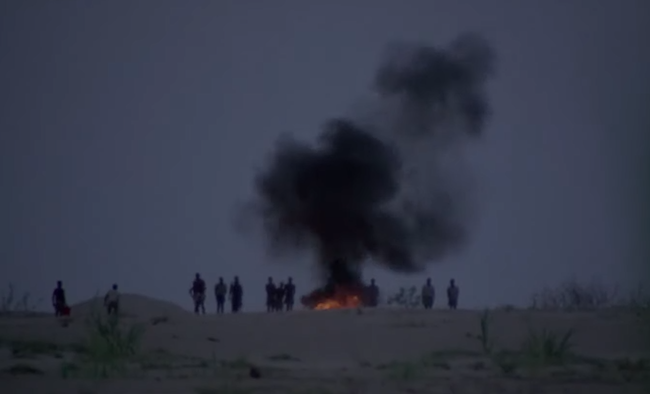
Cremation of those killed in the aftermath of the failed Tutsi rebel invasion, January 1964

After another Tutsi rebel invasion in late December 1963, the Rwandan government purged moderate Hutu and leading Tutsi politicians. Rwandan Tutsi in general also became targets of mass killings, with the estimated death toll ranging from 1,000 to 20,000. More Tutsi fled to escape the violence, thousands of whom went to Burundi.

Burundi was the only state to openly condemn the killings. The Burundian government further accused the Rwandan military of crossing into their territory on 22 January 1964 and killing Burundian nationals in bordering regions. The Burundian military was mobilised, and created a "buffer zone" at the border with Rwanda, forbidding anyone from entering it without authorisation. In turn, the Rwandan government accused Burundi of allowing the raid to occur and potentially backing the attack. Burundian Prime Minister Pierre Ngendandumwe denied his government's involvement in the invasion, (Note: On the morning of 23 December Ngendandumwe had told a Rwandan official in Bujumbura that he knew nothing of the invasion, having first heard of it in a radio report.) and attempted to convince the Organisation of African Unity (OAU) to convene a meeting on the apparent border incident. The invasion also spawned a debate in the Burundian National Assembly in February over possible sanctions against the rebels. The Hutu parliamentary faction advocated extraditing known rebels to Rwanda, while the Tutsi bloc advised against this. Ultimately, no action was taken. The border violation dispute was dropped in April 1964 without official resolution, though by then, tensions had subsided. Nevertheless, the invasion led the governments to exchange bitter communiques and insult each other on their state radio stations until 1965.

=== Political instability in Burundi ===
On 15 January 1965, Prime Minister Ngendandumwe (who was Hutu) was assassinated; his alleged assassin was a Rwandan Tutsi refugee, which prompted the Burundian government to arrest him, along with several other Rwandan refugees, including most of the leaders of the Armée Populaire de Libération Rwandaise. Despite these arrests and subsequent investigations, the Supreme Court of Burundi dismissed all charges against those accused in the assassination in December 1967, citing a lack of evidence.

After a series of coups or coup attempts in October 1965, July 1966, and November 1966, Tutsi Army Captain Michel Micombero took control of the Burundian government and abolished the monarchy. Soon after taking over, he pledged to improve Burundi's relations with its neighbours, including Rwanda. The President of Rwanda, Grégoire Kayibanda, immediately extended his country's recognition to the new government of Burundi. Burundi's relations with Rwanda subsequently improved, and official, post-independence diplomatic relations were established in August 1969.

==== Ikiza ====
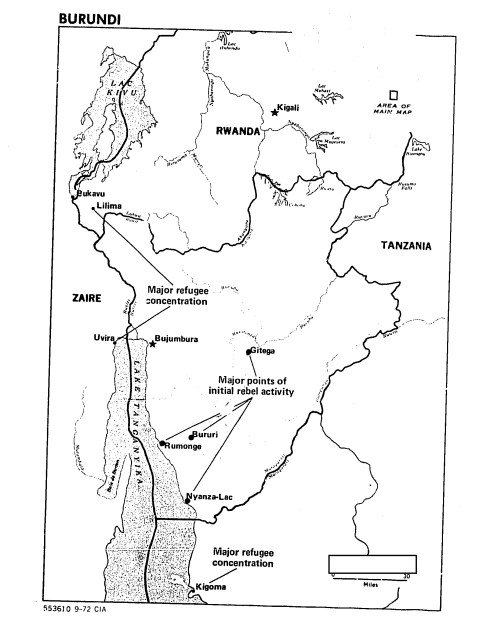
Map of Burundi; shows impacts of the 1972 Hutu uprising and government reprisal killings

The Rwanda Revolution and its aftermath dramatically worsened Tutsi–Hutu relations in Burundi, and from that point onward, the country's Tutsi-led regimes sought to avoid a similar revolution in their own territory. Fear of such a development strongly motivated the Burundian government under Micombero to massacre thousands of Hutu in 1972 in response to a Hutu uprising, with the participation of some Rwandan Tutsi refugees. Several Rwandan citizens were also among those killed. These killings (called the Ikiza) prompted a large, mostly-Hutu exodus from Burundi to neighboring countries, including around 6,000 to Rwanda (although roughly half would later leave for Tanzania).

On 1 June 1972, after American diplomats spoke with Rwandan President Kayibanda (who was Hutu), the Rwandan Minister of International Cooperation delivered a letter signed by Kayibanda to the Burundian authorities, which urged Micombero to stop the killings. Beyond this, most African heads of state made no public condemnation of the killings in Burundi, though the National Union of Students of Uganda did so on 16 July. The Rwandan government formally accused Burundi of committing genocide against Hutu at an OAU meeting in May 1973.

The Ikiza worsened ethnic tensions in Rwanda, where Hutu began harassing and attacking Tutsi. Faced with increasing political isolation, Kayibanda used the Burundi killings as a reason to take further discriminatory measures against Tutsi. His government's use of vigilante committees to implement this generated instability when these committees began questioning the power of the authorities, facilitating army officer Juvénal Habyarimana's coup in 1973.

== Modern relations (1990–present) ==
=== Rwandan reactions to the 1993 events in Burundi ===
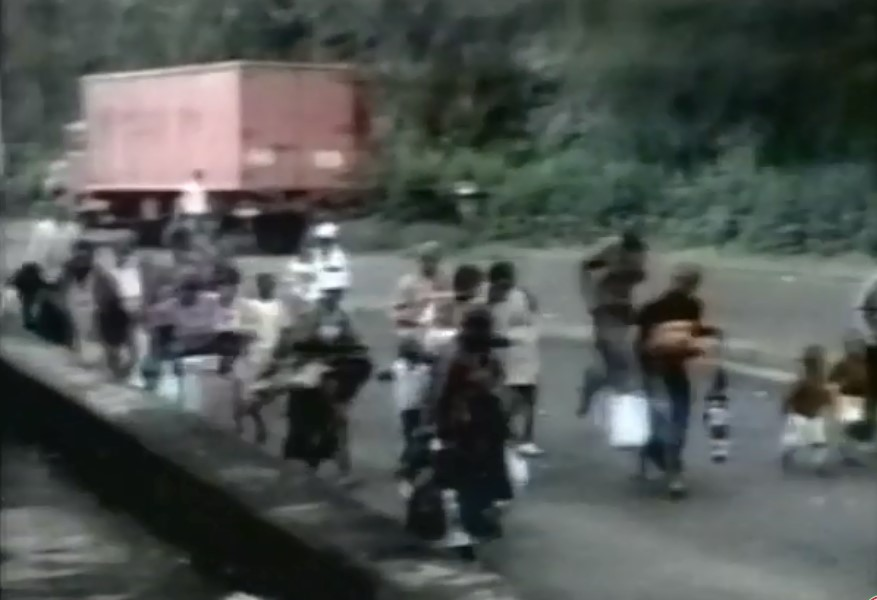
Burundians fleeing from violence in the aftermath of the coup attempt

Rwanda condemned the 1993 coup attempt in Burundi, which killed the Hutu president Melchior Ndadaye and became a catalyst for widespread ethnic violence against Burundian Tutsi. A joint study – conducted by the United Nations Population Fund and the Burundian government in 2002 – estimated that 116,059 people were killed from 21 October to 31 December 1993, with at least 100,000 deaths occurring in late October. It remains unclear what proportion of these victims were Tutsi or Hutu, and the question of whether the killings of Tutsi during this time arose from a planned genocide or from spontaneous violence remains heavily disputed among academics and Burundians who lived through the events.

During the 1990–1994 Rwandan Civil War, many Hutu politicians recalled the Ikiza, using it to inform their fears of atrocities if the Tutsi-dominated Rwandan Patriotic Front (RPF) succeeded in seizing power. The killing of Ndadaye and the flight of 300,000 Hutu refugees to Rwanda during the violence crystallised anti-Tutsi sentiment among Hutu there, and greatly troubled the prospects of the Arusha Accords, a power-sharing agreement designed to end the civil war. Filip Reyntjens asserted that Ndadaye's assassination completely derailed the peace process in Rwanda. Some Rwandan Hutu even speculated that the RPF had assisted in the coup. (Note: Prunier described the Rwandan Patriotic Front's attitude towards the coup as "ambivalent"; the organisation issued a communique officially condemning Ndadaye's murder and the subsequent ethnic violence, but some of its members openly celebrated the president's death. The RPF also helped several Burundian army officers purportedly involved in the coup settle in Kampala after fleeing Burundi.) Radio Télévision Libre des Mille Collines (RTLM), a Rwandan Hutu extremist propaganda station, deliberately misreported the details of Ndadaye's death – saying he had been tortured and castrated – to inflame anti-Tutsi sentiment. According to Gérard Prunier, the death of Ndadaye greatly strengthened the messaging of Rwandan Hutu extremists who sought to exterminate Tutsi, and allowed them to push their ideas beyond fringe status, culminating in the Rwandan genocide of 1994; Alison Des Forges wrote that the muted international response to the killings "led to the cataclysm in Rwanda".

=== Assassinations ===
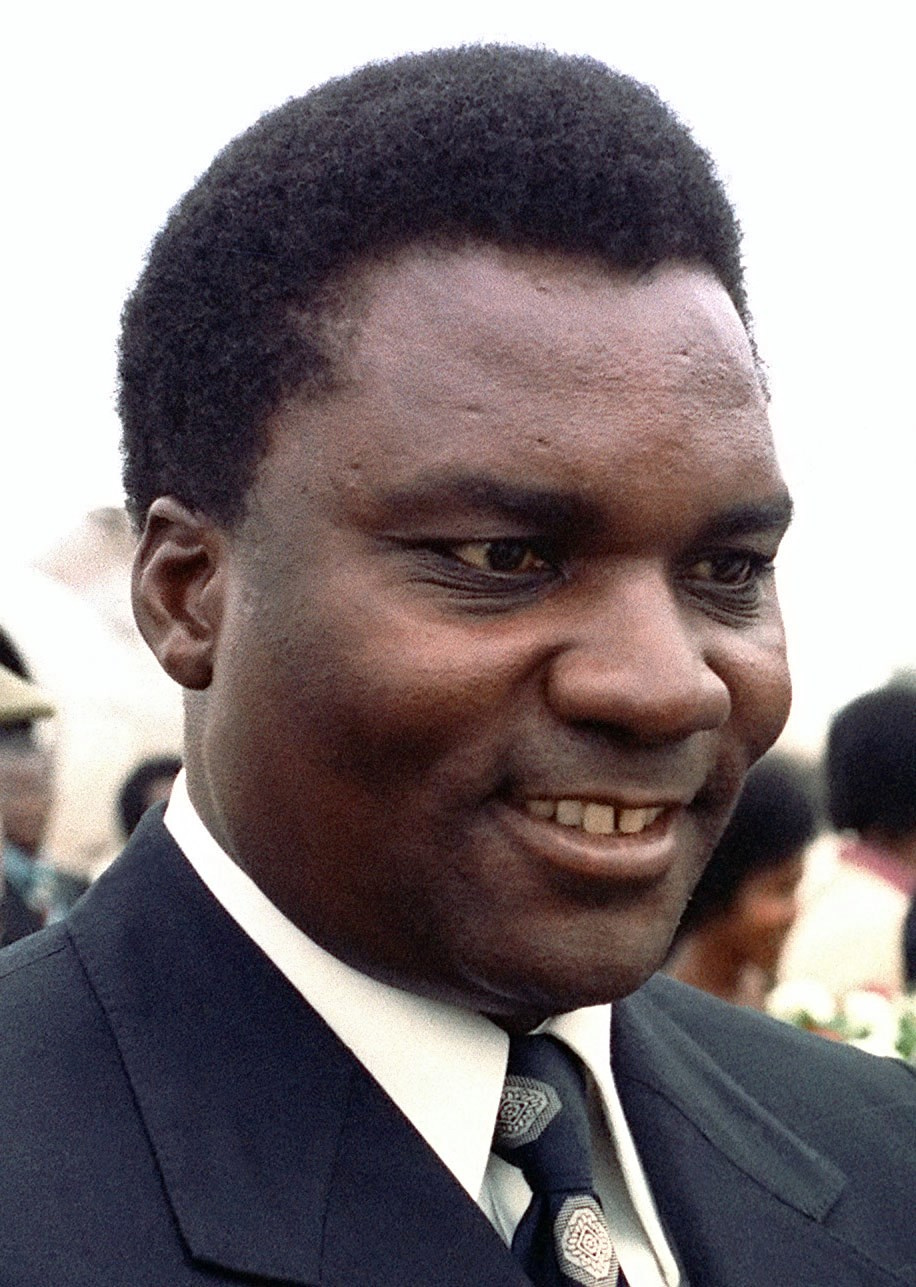
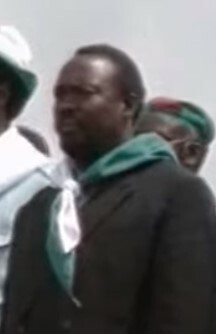
Juvénal Habyarimana (left);
Cyprien Ntaryamira (right)

On 6 April 1994, Rwandan President Habyarimana and Burundi's new president, Cyprien Ntaryamira, were assassinated after their plane was shot down by surface-to-air missiles, breaking the Arusha Accords.

Observers feared that President Ntaryamira's death would lead to widespread violence in Burundi, as had happened when his predecessor was assassinated. However, unlike in Rwanda, the situation in Burundi remained peaceful after word was received of its president's death. The Burundian government declared that the plane crash was caused by an accident, and President of the National Assembly Sylvestre Ntibantunganya made a broadcast on television appealing for calm. Diplomats reported that most Burundians believed that the attack was meant to target the Rwandan president, not theirs. Ntibantunganya, who became his successor, held similar views, considering Ntaryamira's death to be "by the facts of circumstance", and that he was not targeted.

Faced with the spillover of the Rwandan Civil War, Ntibantunganya's government pursued a strict policy of neutrality, denying officials of the former Habyarimana government residency in Bujumbura, and refusing to allow French troops to use Burundi as a staging area for Opération Turquoise. In May 1994, he met with RPF leader Pasteur Bizimungu.

=== Aftermath of the Rwandan genocide ===
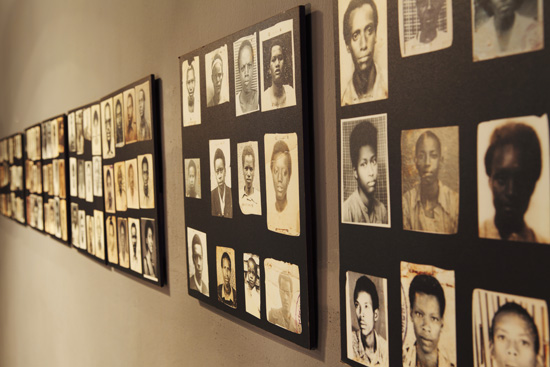
Pictures of Rwandan genocide victims at the Kigali Genocide Memorial

Beginning the day after the assassinations, Rwandan Hutu extremists carried out a genocide that killed 500,000–800,000 Tutsi, as well as 10,000 Batwa and some moderate Hutu, between 7 April and 15 July 1994. Following this, the RPF resumed their military campaign, defeating the government and taking complete control of the country on 18 July.

The genocide created a refugee crisis; an estimated 300,000 Rwandans ultimately fled to Burundi, while approximately 180,000 Burundian exiles who had fled to Rwanda in October 1993 also returned. With international assistance, Burundi opened new refugee camps to house them.

==== Escalating civil war in Burundi ====
The military and paramilitary forces of the old Rwandan Hutu regime (Ex-FAR/ALiR and Interahamwe) subsequently fled into Zaire, then rebuilt their strength and launched an insurgency against the RPF. The Burundian CNDD–FDD and PALIPEHUTU-FNL (the country's most prominent Hutu rebel groups) soon allied themselves with the Rwandan Hutu factions, which consequently aided them in attacking the Burundian military. Although the CNDD–FDD's denied these links, Reyntjens assessed how northern Burundi's situation made Rwandan and Burundian Hutu rebel groups "objective allies" for geopolitical convenience, given an interest "in effectively controlling this area which could become a major base for an invasion of Rwanda by Rwandan exiles."

The increased internal conflict and decline of state authority in Burundi greatly alarmed the RPF-led government of Rwanda. The RPF feared that the collapse of the Burundian government would lead not only to the influx of possibly 500,000 Tutsi refugees into Rwanda, but also provide a new haven to the Rwandan Hutu insurgents. Because of this, Rwanda began providing aid to the Burundian government from 1995. Rwandan troops would repeatedly cross the border and attack Hutu refugee camps which harbored rebel forces, in coordination with the Burundian military and local Tutsi militias.

==== Congo Wars ====
Rwanda's views on the Burundian Civil War also influenced its decision to launch the First Congo War in late 1996. By overthrowing Zairian President Mobutu Sese Seko, Rwanda hoped to eliminate Zaire as a haven for various Hutu rebel groups. Burundi supported Rwandan involvement in Zaire, but provided very limited military support.

Although Rwanda successfully overthrew Mobutu in a matter of months (replacing him with Laurent-Désiré Kabila), CNDD–FDD rebels still significantly expand their operations in 1997, even infiltrating Burundi and attacking Rutovu, President Pierre Buyoya's home town and the center of Burundi's Tutsi elite at the time. Later on, some elements of the new Congolese government under Kabila's son, Joseph, came to support the Burundian insurgents by the early 2000s, just as Mobutu had done previously.

=== Relations since the 2000s ===
Both Burundi and Rwanda joined the East African Community (EAC) in December 2006.

Although relations between Rwandan President Paul Kagame and Burundian President Pierre Nkurunziza were initially friendly, this dynamic shifted significantly after the 2012–2013 M23 rebellion in the Democratic Republic of the Congo, with Nkurunziza opposing the March 23 Movement, and the Kagame-led Rwanda backing it.

==== Burundian unrest ====
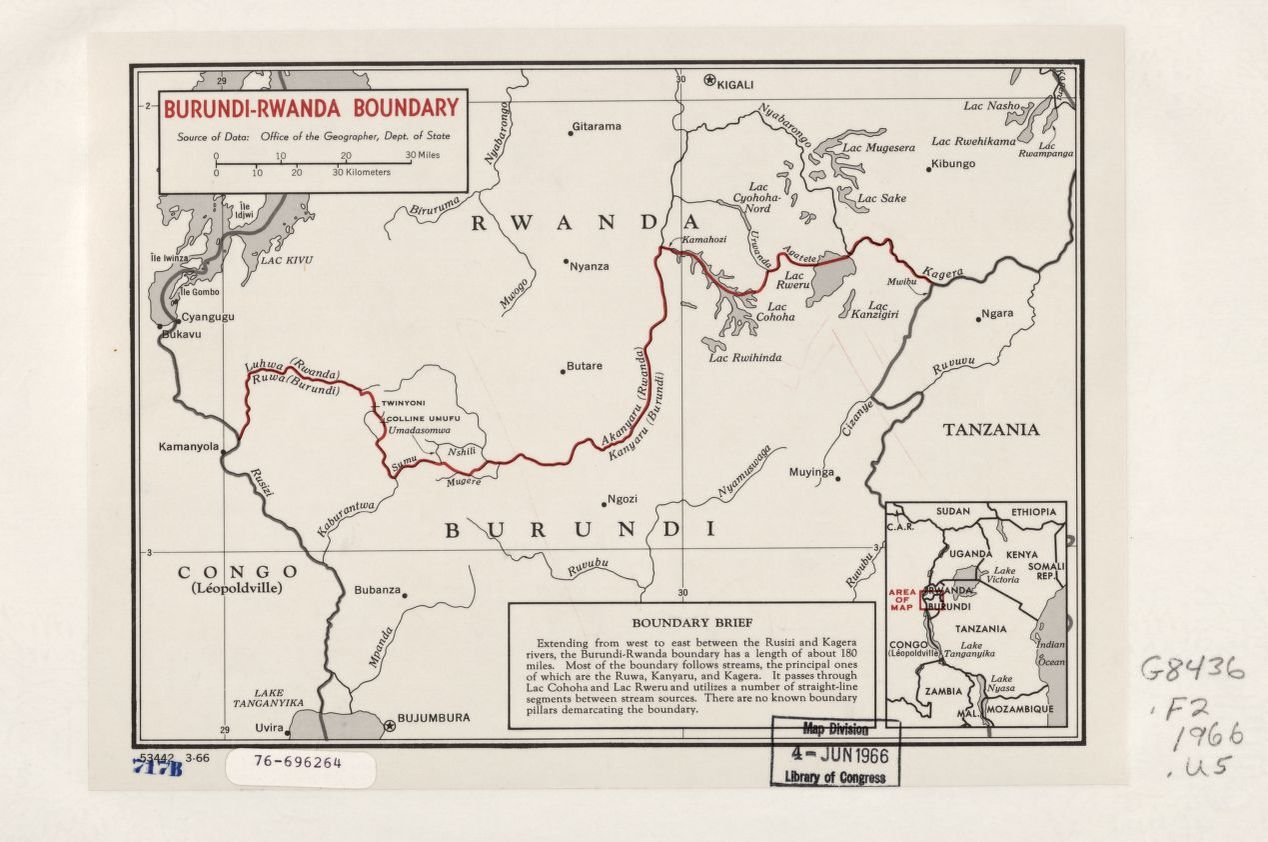
Burundi–Rwanda border

Beginning in April 2015, and especially after a failed coup attempt the following month, Burundi (now led by the CNDD–FDD) launched major crackdowns on protesters, prompting more than 390,000 Burundians to flee to neighbouring countries by May 2018, including to Rwanda. The unrest caused even more strain on relations between Rwanda and Burundi; Kagame was among those critical of Nkurunziza for seeking a third term, and both countries accused each other of harbouring hostile rebel groups. Desire Nyaruhirira, a Rwandan diplomat, was expelled from Burundi in October 2015 after it accused him of being a destabilising actor. According to both the United States and a confidential United Nations report, the Rwanda Defence Force was training and recruiting Burundian refugees in the eastern DRC – some of them being children – to attack Nkurunziza's government.

==== M23 offensive ====
On 15 August 2022, Burundi began sending troops to Kivu in the DRC to fight against M23 rebels, which were fighting alongside Rwandan troops (despite official denials from Rwanda). They arrived as part of the first contingent of EAC peacekeeping forces to deal with the M23 offensive, with Burundians being the largest contributors. The Burundian presence in the region was controversial, as despite ostensibly being there to fight the rebels, they were instead reported to be co-existing in the same space as the M23.

==== RED-Tabara ====
In January 2024, Burundi closed all its land borders with Rwanda indefinitely after the latter was accused of supporting the RED-Tabara.

==== Threats of force ====
In March 2025, President Évariste Ndayishimiye of Burundi told BBC News that he had seen "credible intelligence" that Rwanda planned to attack his country. Rwanda's government called Ndayishimiye's comments "surprising" and noted that the two neighbours are co-operating on security plans for their shared border.

== See also ==
- Foreign relations of Burundi
- Foreign relations of Rwanda
