= Ririkumutima =

Ririjumutima

Queen Regent of Burundi
- Tenure: 1908 – 28 July 1917
- Born: Kingdom of Burundi
- Died: July 28, 1917; Gitega, Burundi
- Spouse: Mwezi IV Gisabo
Names
- Mwamikazi Nidi Ririkumutima Bizima Bitazimiza Mwezi
- Father: Sekawonyi
- Mother: Inankinso

Mwamikazi Nidi Ririkumutima Bizima Bitazimiza Mwezi, commonly known as Ririkumutima, (died 28 July 1917) was Queen Regent of Burundi from 1908 to her death. She was married to the king (mwami) of Burundi, Mwezi IV Gisabo in the mid 1890s and she was his favourite wife. However, when king Mwezi IV died in 1908, Ririkumutima fell out of royalty as Mutaga IV Mbikije, one of his sons, became king. This led to a lot of strife in the kingdom.

== Early life and family ==
Ririkumutima was born in the mid-nineteenth century in the Kingdom of Burundi, the third daughter of Chief Sekawonyi of the Watussi Munyakarama clan by his wife Inankinso. One of thirteen wives of Mwezi Gisabo (ca. 1850 – 1908), king of Burundi, Ririkumutima gave birth to three daughters and six sons.

== Political career ==
The elderly king Mwezi died in 1908. Ririkumutima was anxious to secure that the royal succession would pass to one of her sons. Aware that another wife, Ntibahinya, was gaining favour and that the throne seemed likely to pass to Ntibahinya's son, Mbikije, Ririkumutima arranged for Ntibahinya's assassination. She then proclaimed throughout the kingdom that she was Mbikije's mother and therefore the rightful queen mother. While it was widely known that Ririkumutima was not Mbikije's biological mother, the fiction was accepted and she served as regent both during Mbikije's reign as Mutaga IV Mbikije and the following reign of Mwambutsa IV Bangiricenge.

The role of queen mother (mugabekazi) was a highly revered one in Burundian society; this, coupled with Ririkumutima's political acumen made her a formidable presence. Her other sons became important chiefs in the local aristocracy.

=== Relation to European colonial government ===
Though Burundi had become an Imperial German colony as part of the German East Africa in 1890, the colonial power did not effectively occupy or control the region. In 1916 during World War I, the Belgian troops invaded and occupied the region.

The first Europeans to encounter Ririkumutima described her as being:

carried by bearers on her litter from one royal residence to another and [someone who] personally dealt with the kingdom's affairs. In her visits to the European authorities, this slow-speaking woman, incapable of a movement, showed herself to be as intelligent, as energetic and more stubborn than all the princes in her entourage.

— R. Bourgeois, Banyarwanda et Barundi, (1954), p. 54

== Death ==
Ririkumutima died at Gitega on 28 July 1917.
