= Prince Godefroid Kamatari =

Prince Godefroid Kamatari (1957 – 20 August 2005) was a grandson of Mwami Mutaga IV Mbikije of Burundi, and a son of Prince Ignace Kamatari (d. 1964 in Bujumbura) and his second wife Princess Agrippine.

Prince Kamatari led the Abahuza party in Burundi, which advocates a return of a constitutional monarchy in Burundi, as a stabilising factor in its bloody history. Most of the exiled members of the royal family live in France and elsewhere in Europe.

He died in Kigali, Rwanda on 20 August 2005.

== Siblings ==
=== By first wife ===
Prince Kamatari had 2 half sisters born to his father's first wife Princess Ndaribarire and Ntihabose Ciza:

- Princess Catherine Kamatari (by his father's first wife Princess Ndaribarire), (Born 1932)
- Prince Deogratias Kamatari (by Ntihabose Ciza - Umusumano Clan), (Born 1942)

=== By subsequent wives ===
Prince Godefroid's other Siblings are:

Prince Pascal Kamatari (by his mother Princess Agrippine), (1949-1997) Was married to Mimi von der Recke.

Princess Esther Kamatari (Born 1951)

Prince Louis Kamatari, (Born 1953)

Princess Baudouine Kamatari, (Born 1955)

Princess Fabiola Kamatari, (Born 1961)
