= Mwambutsa I of Burundi =

King of Burundi

Mwambutsa I Mbariza was the ruler of the Kingdom of Burundi from 1767 to 1796. His only son was Ntare II Rutaganzwa Rugamba. He succeeded Mwami Mutaga III Senyamwiza Mutamo.

Regnal titles
Preceded by Mutaga III	King of Burundi; 1767–1796	Succeeded by Ntare II

== Succession ==
Following the death of Mutaga Senyamwiza in 1767, three of his sons—Mbonyingingo, Sebitungwa and Ntisemberwa—were reported to have claimed the throne. According to a traditional account recorded in sources on Burundian history, the succession was decided during the Muganuro festival, when the candidates were required to lift the royal drum, the Karyenda. Ntisemberwa succeeded in lifting the drum and was subsequently enthroned as Mwambutsa Mbariza. He ruled from approximately 1767 to 1796 and was succeeded by his son Ntare Rugamba.
