= Gishora =

The field of Gishora is located approximately 7 km north of the city of Gitega, in the Gitega Province of Burundi. It houses a royal palace and royal field.

== Site Description ==
Gishora is on the top of the Gishora Hill in the commune of Giheta, 7 km from the town of Gitega. In the residence of Gishora, the first court or forecourt, called Intangaro, shelters the sanctuary of the sacred drums. The second largest, which is the royal court, includes the royal residence (Ingoro). With time, this court was generally occupied by the chiefs and the backyard (ikigo) includes the dwelling of the maidservants, the room of worship (indaro ya Rugabo) and other structures. This court was only reserved for the royal family. Before one has to reach the residence, there was a public reception place called Inama.

== History ==
The royal field of Gishora was founded by the Mwami (or King of Burundi) Ntare Rugamba in the first half of the 19th century after its victory against the Chief Ntibirangwa rebels.

== World Heritage Status ==
This site was added to the UNESCO World Heritage Tentative List on May 9, 2007 in the Cultural category.
