= Royal Drummers of Burundi =

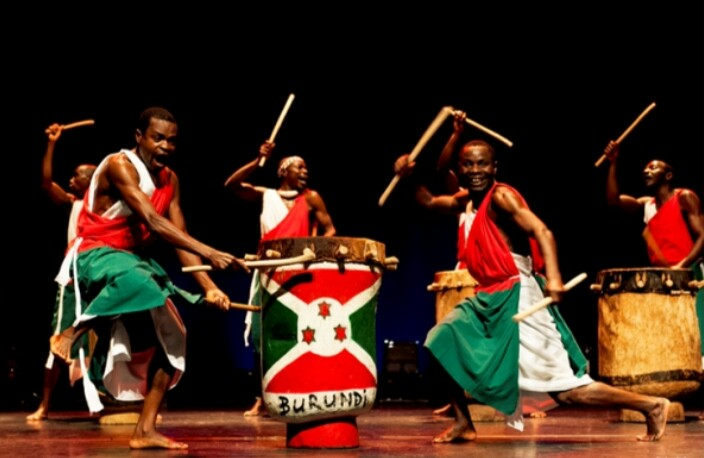

Background information
- Also known as: The Drummers of Burundi
- Origin: Burundi
- Years active: 1960s–present

The Royal Drummers of Burundi, commonly known in recordings as The Drummers of Burundi or as The Master Drummers of Burundi, is a percussion ensemble originally from Burundi. Their performances are a part of ceremonies such as births, funerals, and coronations of mwami (Kings). Drums (called karyenda) are sacred in Burundi, and represent the mwami, fertility and regeneration. The Royal Drummers use drums made from hollowed tree trunks covered with animal skins. In addition to the central drum, called Inkiranya, there are Amashako drums which provide a continuous beat, and Ibishikiso drums, which follow the rhythm established by the Inkiranya.

The performance of the Royal Drummers has been the same for centuries, and their techniques and traditions are passed down from father to son. The members of the ensemble take turns playing the Inkiranya, dancing, resting, and playing the other drums, rotating throughout the show without interruptions. At the start of their performance, the drummers enter balancing the heavy drums on their heads and singing and playing. There are some extra members who carry ornamental spears and shields and lead the procession with their dance. They then perform a series of rhythms, some accompanied by song, and exit the stage the same way, carrying the drums on their heads and playing.

Beginning in the 1960s, the Drummers have toured the world. They have recorded at least three albums - Batimbo (Musiques Et Chants) in 1991,The Drummers of Burundi (1992, recorded 1987) Real World (retitled Live at Real World in 1993) and The Master Drummers of Burundi (1981 lp, 1994 cd). They have also appeared on Joni Mitchell's The Hissing of Summer Lawns (1975), and on "Zimbo", the B-side of the Echo & the Bunnymen 12" single of "The Cutter" (1983). It is often claimed that they perform on the Def Leppard single "Rocket", but this is a misattribution. They have influenced artists such as Adam and the Ants and Bow Wow Wow, and inspired Thomas Brooman to organize the WOMAD festival in 1982, which shaped the burgeoning world music genre.

The Drummers were featured in Werner Herzog's film Fitzcarraldo, as the "drumming of the bushmen".
