= Mutaga IV of Burundi =

Mutaga IV Mbikije

King of Burundi
- Reign: 21 August 1908 – 30 November 1915
- Predecessor: Mwezi IV Gisabo
- Successor: Mwambutsa IV Bangiricenge
- Born: 1892; Kingdom of Burundi
- Died: 30 November 1915 (aged 22–23); Kingdom of Burundi, German East Africa
- Spouse: Niyakire; Princess Ngenzahayo
- Issue: Ignace Kamatari; Mwambutsa IV Bangiricenge
Names
- Mutaga IV Mbikije
- Dynasty: Abaganwa
- Father: Mwami Mwezi IV
- Mother: Ntibanyiha

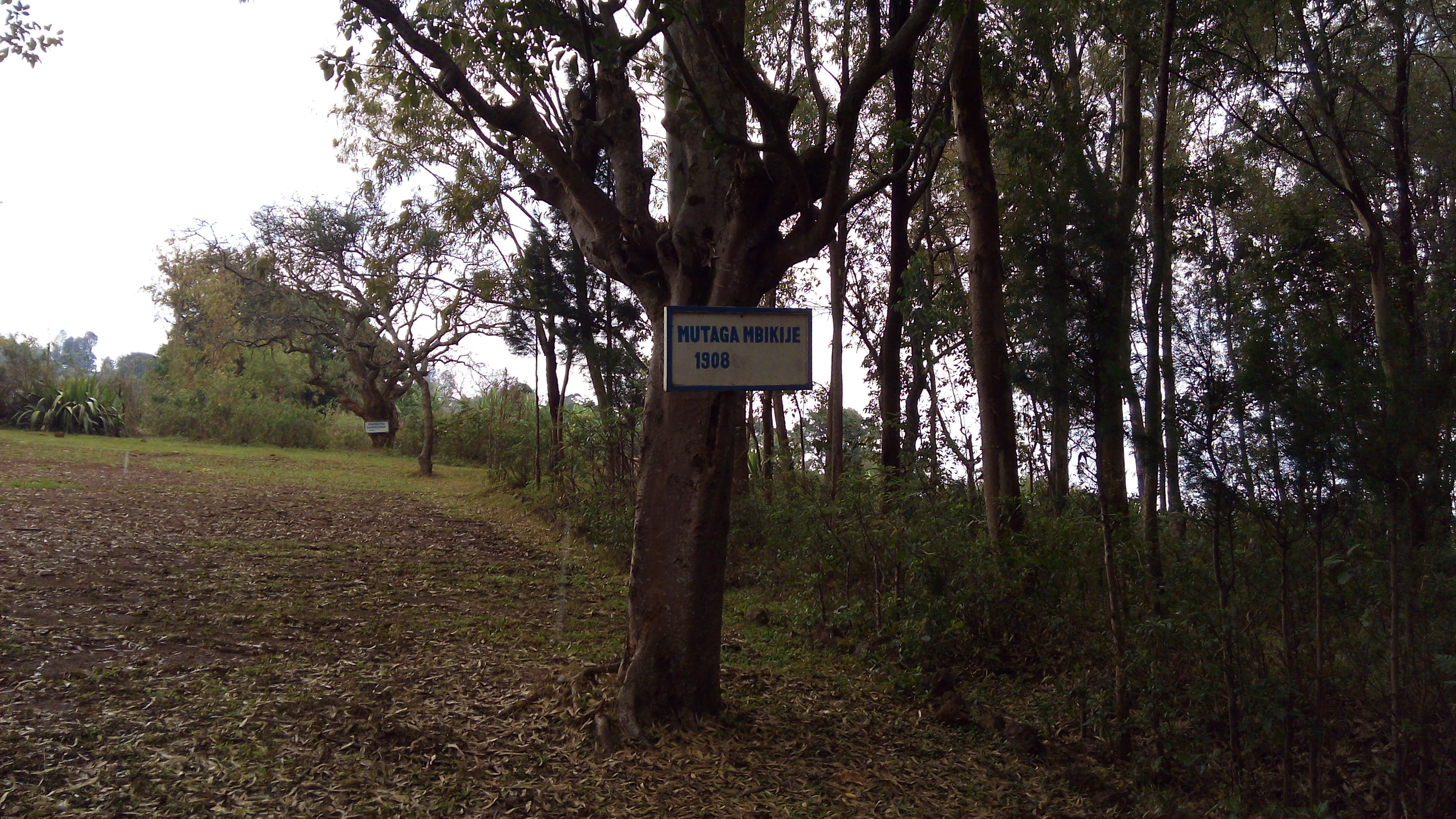
Modern-day view of the ceremonially planted tree (ikigabiro) from the coronation of Mutaga IV

Mutaga IV Mbikije (c. 1892 – 30 November 1915) was the king of Burundi from 21 August 1908 until 30 November 1915. He was the son of Mwami Mwezi IV. He inherited the throne at the age of 15, after his father died in 1908, under the regnal name of Mutaga. Being too young to ensure continuity, he ruled with the help of a regency council consisting of another wife of his father, Ririkumutima, and a half-brother of this father, Ntanigera. Mutaga IV died prematurely in November 1915 after a fight that supposedly pitted him against his younger brother, Prince Bangura.

He had two sons:

- Mwambutsa IV Bangiricenge
- Prince Ignace Kamatari (died 1964), father of Princess Esther Kamatari

His stepmother, Ririkumutima, served as regent for much of his reign.

Regnal titles
Preceded by Mwezi IV	King of Burundi; 1908–1915	Succeeded by Mwambutsa IV
