= Gitega prison fire =

2021 disaster in Burundi

- Date: 7 December 2021
- Time: 04:00 CAT
- Location: Gitega, Burundi; 03°25′34″S 29°56′08″E
- Cause: Electrical failure
- Deaths: 38
- Injuries: 69+
- Property damage: Unknown

At approximately 04:00 CAT on 7 December 2021, a fire broke out in an overcrowded prison in Gitega, Burundi, killing at least 38 and injuring more than 69.

== Background ==
Overcrowding is a major problem in Burundi prisons where, according to October figures, 13,100 inmates live in facilities designed to accommodate no more than 4,100 people. In June, over 5000 inmates received presidential pardons in an attempt to empty the country's overcrowded jails.

According to the Christian Association Against Torture, the prison had the capacity for 400 prisoners, but at the time of the fire it held 1,539 inmates. Most of the inmates were males, however, it had a women's wing as well. It also housed several political prisoners in a high security compound. Earlier in August, a fire broke out in the same prison, which the authorities blamed on electrical problems.

== Accident ==
The blaze started at 04:00 CAT time (02:00 GMT) on 7 December 2021 while many of the inmates were asleep. The Interior Ministry stated in a tweet that a short circuit was responsible for the fire. According to the survivors, the police refused to open the quarters as the flames spread. According to one of the inmates, over 90% of the sleeping halls were burnt. Images circulating online showed a burning building and piles of bodies.

A police source stated that emergency services arrived late with the fire truck reaching the prison two hours after the fire began. Nurses from the Gitega hospital, as well as teams from the Red Cross, arrived at the scene to tend to the victims. Those with minor injuries were treated at the scene, while those with severe burns were taken to a hospital. Vice President Prosper Bazombanza told reporters that 38 people died in the fire.

Of these, twelve died of asphyxia as they attempted to flee the burning building and 26 more died of severe injuries. Many of the victims were elderly inmates. He added that at least 69 were injured.

== Aftermath ==
Vice President Bazombanza, along with several senior ministers visited the scene of the accident. According to witness reports, soldiers and police officers surrounded the site of the fire, preventing journalists from approaching and taking pictures.

== See also ==
- Tangerang prison fire
