= Coat of arms of Burundi =

National coat of arms of the Republic of Burundi

- Armiger: Republic of Burundi
- Adopted: 1966
- Motto: Unité, Travail, Progrès ('Unity, Labour, Progress')

The coat of arms of Burundi, adopted in 1966, consists of a shield surrounded by three spears. On the shield is the motto of the nation, as well as the head of a lion. Behind the shield there are three crossed traditional African spears. Under the shield the national motto of Burundi appears on a scroll: Unité, Travail, Progrès (French for 'Unity, Labour, Progress').

== Official description ==
The constitution of Burundi describes the coat of arms as follows:

"The motto of Burundi is 'Unité, Travail, Progrès'. The emblem of the Republic is a shield charged with a head of a lion, together with three spears, the whole surrounded by the national motto."

== History ==
The previous coat of arms of the Kingdom of Burundi, used from 1962 until 1966, looked very similar, except that the royal karyenda drum was surmounted on the top as a symbol of the mwami ('king'), surrounded by two laurels. The number of spears was four. The national motto was Ganza Sabwa, which is Kirundi for 'The King rules and reigns'.

== Gallery ==
Coat of arms of The German East Africa Company

Proposed Coat of arms of The German East Africa (1914)

Coat of arms of Ruanda-Urundi (1916-1962)

Coat of arms of the Kingdom of Burundi (1962–1966)
