= Nandabunga =

Nandabunga (fl. 19th century) was a chief of Buyenzi-Bweru in Ngozi, in what is now known as Burundi. She was a daughter of Mwezi IV of Burundi, and was noted because she accomplished what had been done by few, if any, others of her gender. Twice she commanded the chiefdom under the title of Munganwa. Nandabunga was twice married. Almost nothing is known of her first husband, but the second was a Tutsi named Munyakarama who took no part in governing the chiefdom. It was highly uncommon for the Tutsi women to act as chiefs, making Nandabunga well known for holding such a high rank. There have been many fables and myths about her life and all of Nandabunga's accomplishments, but it is hard to access certain facts about her life.
