= Karyenda =

Traditional African drum

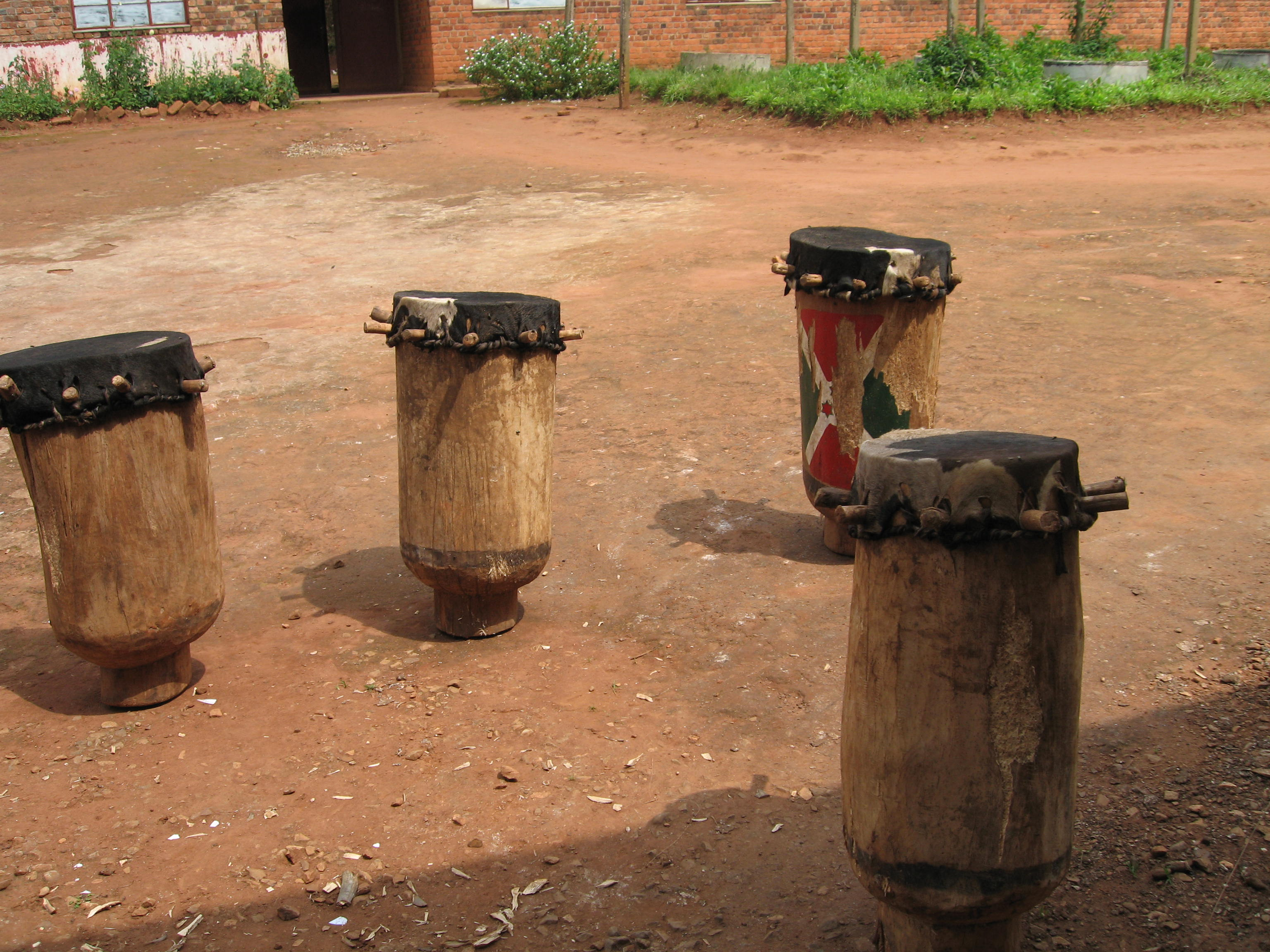
Drums from Gitega, Burundi

The karyenda is a traditional African drum. It was the main symbol of Burundi and its Mwami (King) and had semi-divine status. The Mwami was said to interpret the beatings of the karyenda into rules for the kingdom.

== History ==
Flag of the Kingdom of Burundi with a karyenda in the middle.

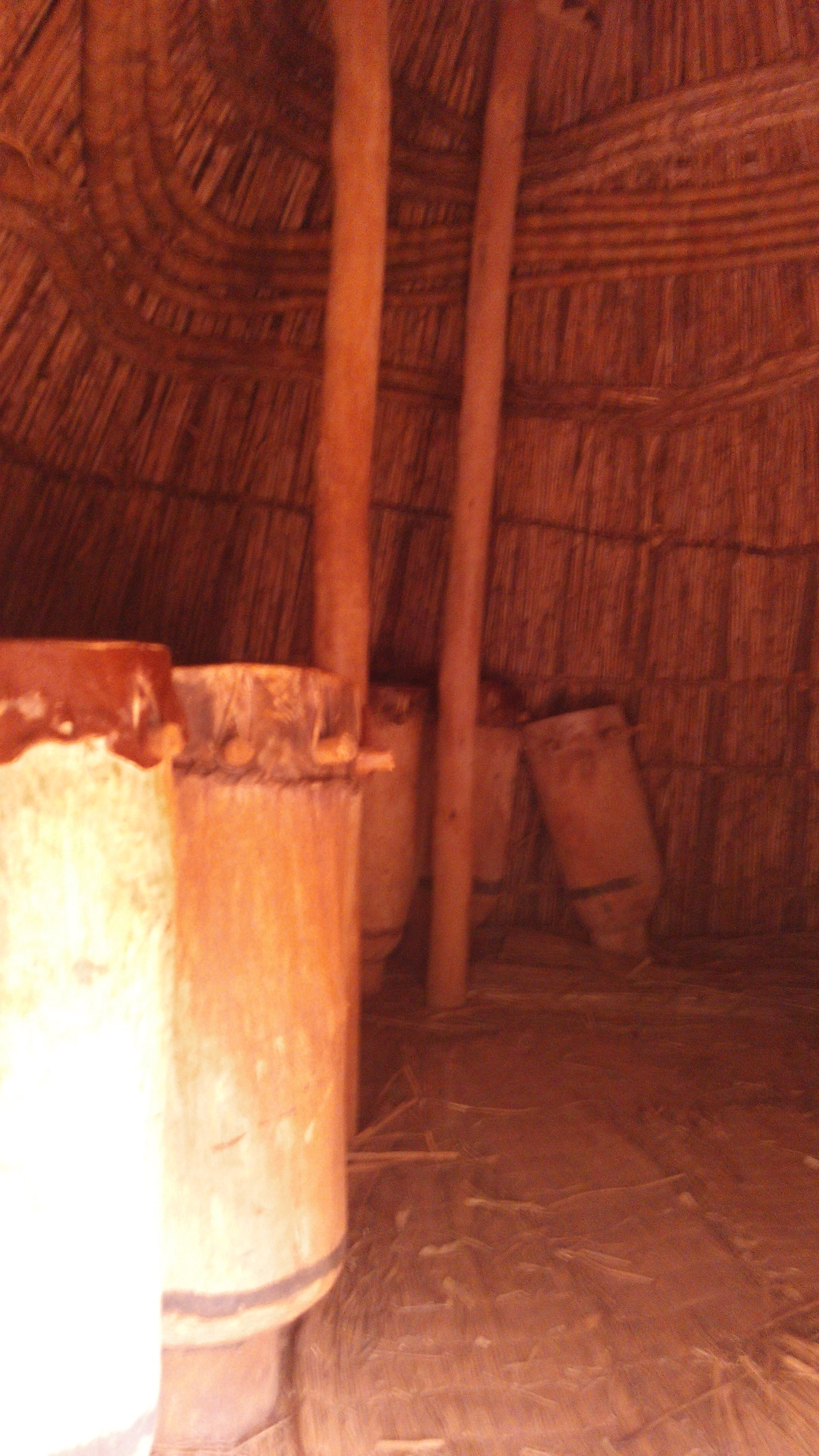
A house of drums

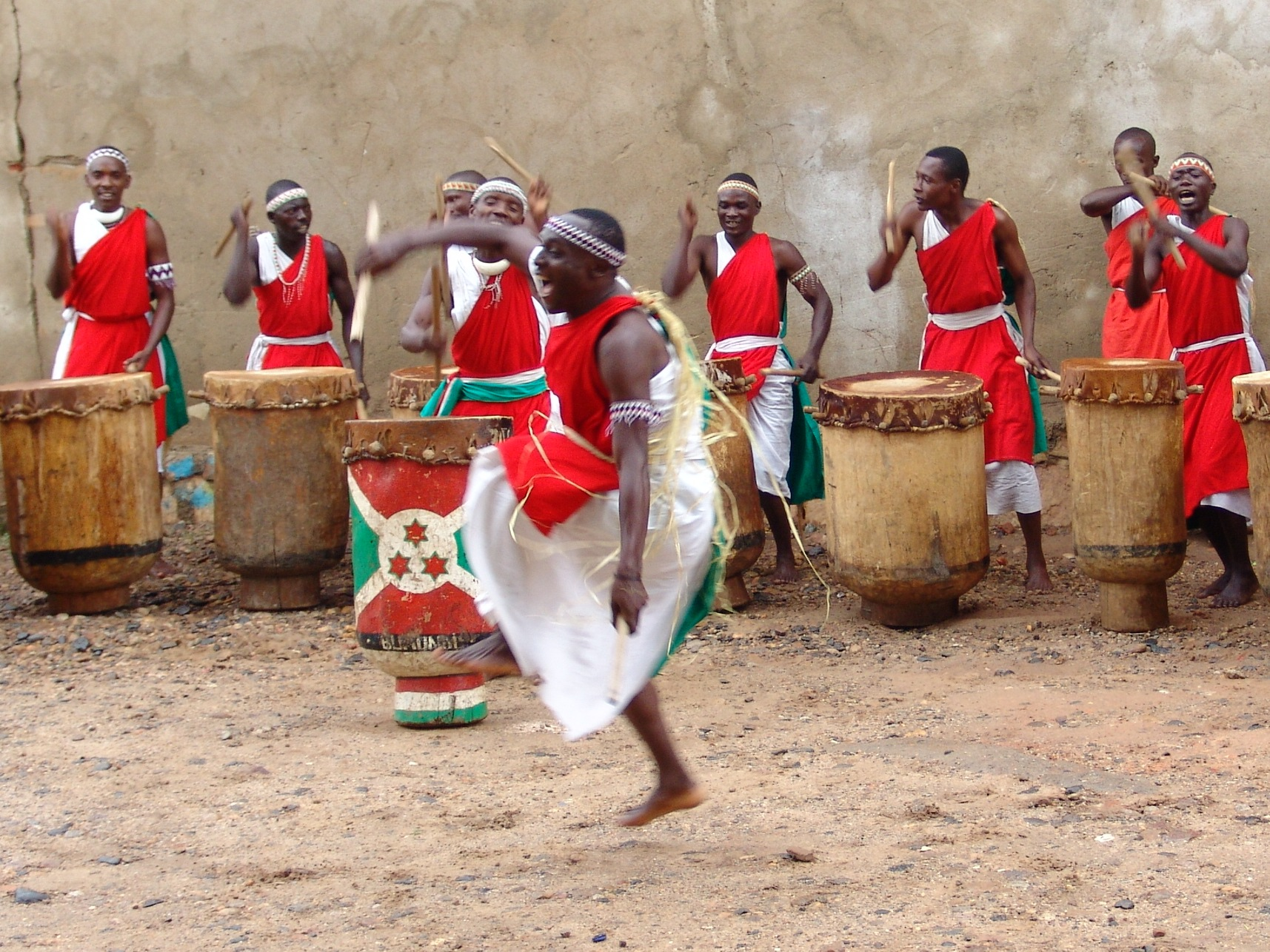
Traditional Burundian drummers

When Burundi gained independence from Belgium in 1962, the karyenda was the symbol on the national flag and its coat of arms from 1962 to 1966. It was replaced after the republic was established. Traditionally the most important folk songs and dances were performed to extol the virtues of the kingship. A major festival was the annual umuganuro (sorghum festival), which was a huge display of pomp, festivities, and dances for the royal court. Since the fall of the monarchy in 1966, and particularly after a massacre of Hutus in 1972, such cultural expressions have waned.

The second most important drum was the rukinzo. It accompanied the mwami wherever he went.

The drums, despite many upheavals, have remained popular and are still revered. The old families who were wardens of the drums have tried to keep the ancient traditions alive. Some have an international outreach, such as the Royal Drummers of Burundi, or L. Ndoricimpa and C. Guillet, who recorded Les tambours du Burundi (The Drums of Burundi) in 1983.

== Symbolism ==
As sacred objects, the drums were much more than simple musical instruments. They were used in rituals, such as the umuganuro, or for special circumstances. Major events for the king, such as royal coronations, funerals, and weddings were announced through the drums. The beating of the drums also signalled certain rites, such as when the mwami rose in the morning or retired in the evening.

Drums had various names, such as "dispenser of peace" or "lady of the land".

The Royal Order of Karyenda and the Royal Order of Rukinzo were founded by King Mwambutsa IV of Burundi on July 1, 1962. The Order of Karyanda was the principal order of the kingdom and was divided into five classes.

== Sanctuaries ==
The drums were normally kept in drum sanctuaries. These were a tight network of high places, as well as centres of political and religious power in pre-colonial Burundi. The sanctuaries were guarded mainly by Hutu families, who were the only ones the king allowed to manufacture, play, and keep the drums or bring them to court for an occasion. They were called abatimbo, which is Rundi for drummers "who hit hard". A sacred drum was enthroned in each sanctuary and guarded by attendants. There were also ingendanyi (minor drums), and a set of drums that were played with the main drums.

Some of the main sanctuaries for the drums were: Gishora Hill, near Gitega; Higiro Hill, also near Gitega; Magamba Hill; and Banga.
