= Abahuza =

Political party in Burundi

Party for the Restoration of Monarchy and Dialogue Parti pour la restauration de la monarchie et la dialogue
- Founder: Prince Godefroid Kamatari
- Founded: 20 September 2004
- Ideology: Constitutional monarchism

The Party for the Restoration of Monarchy and Dialogue (French: Parti pour la restauration de la monarchie et la dialogue), more well known by its nickname Abahuza (lit. 'Come Together' in Kirundi), is a constitutional monarchist political party in Burundi seeking a moderated return of the monarchy which reigned over the Kingdom of Burundi shortly after independence. The party was registered with Burundi's Interior Ministry on 20 September 2004.

The party was founded and led by Prince Godefroid Kamatari, one of the heirs to the Burundian throne, until his death on the 20 August 2005. The main stated goal of the party is the restoration of Burundi's monarchy, which was abolished in 1966, which it asserts resulted in violent ethno-national conflict between the Tutsis and the Hutus. The ethno-national cleavage in Burundi mirrors that in neighboring Rwanda to the north. During that time, many members of the Tutsi royal family were assassinated by Hutu nationalists, and civil wars have ravaged the small country ever since. According to party leaders, a return to a moderate monarchy will put an end to the unrest. Prince Godefroid was able to communicate the central ideology of the party in his statement that "the monarchy lasted 500 years in Burundi in a political environment of stability and cohabitation because the King was the symbol of national unity."

Prince Godefroid had stated that the party sought a constitutional monarchy, like those seen in Europe, as opposed to a totalitarian monarchy. The party chose Princess Esther Kamatari, Godefroid's sister and a former fashion model in Paris, to run as their presidential candidate in the 2005 elections. Their hope is to end the ethnic divisions in the country and restore peace and harmony. In addition, the party hopes to reestablish the monarchy through a referendum that would be voted on. According to Princess Kamatari, her first step as president would be to implement a social plan "because the country is in ruins".
