= Mutaga III of Burundi =

Mwami Mutaga III Senyamwiza Mutamo was the king of Burundi. He ascended to the throne c.1735-1739 and ruled until his death in 1767. He succeeded king Mwezi III Ndagushimiye.

== Life ==
His predecessor as king of Burundi was his father Mwezi III of Burundi.

In Mutaga's life there had been conflicts with Ruanda. Fights that had begun with Burundis expansion northward ended when Mutaga married Rujugira, the daughter of Ruanda's king.

These wars restarted in later years and he died in Butare. Mwambutsa I became his successor.

Regnal titles
Preceded by Mwezi III	King of Burundi; 1739–1767	Succeeded by Mwambutsa I
