= Gitega =

Capital city of Burundi

- Capital city
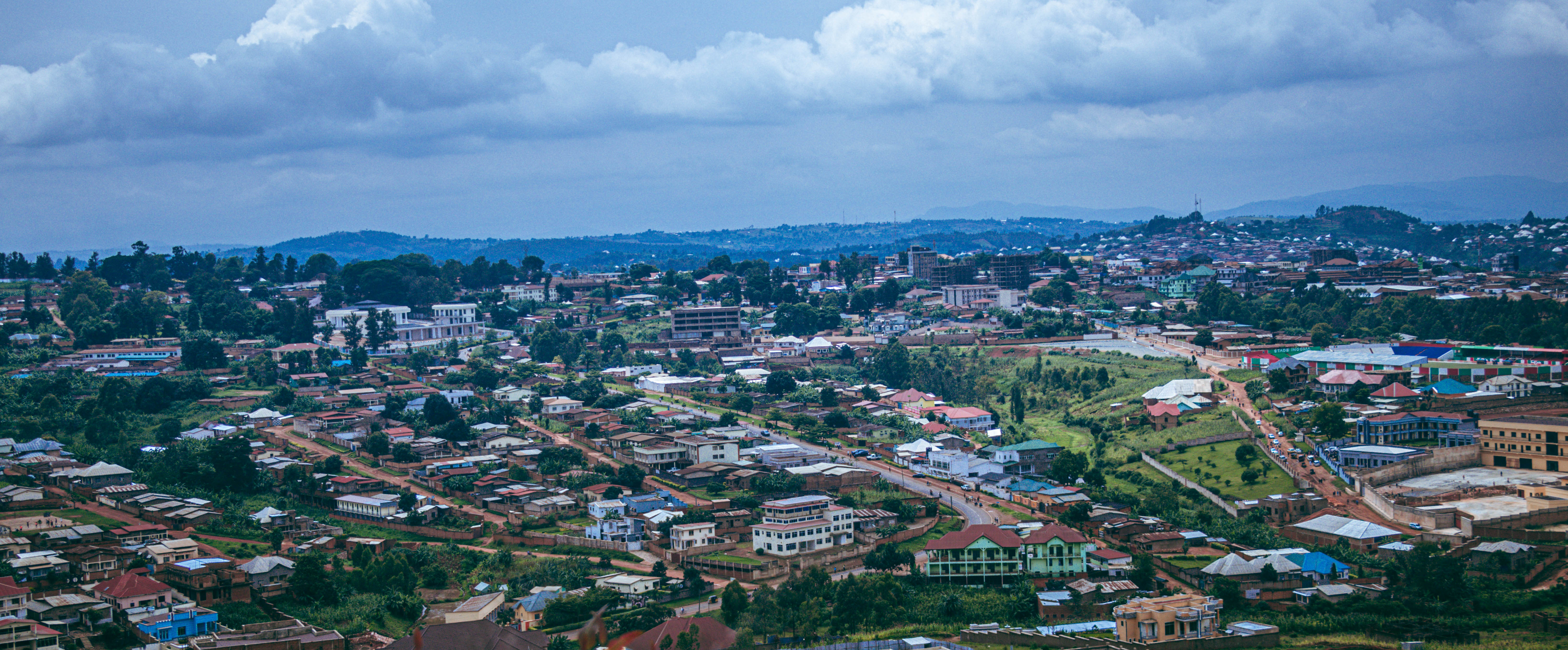
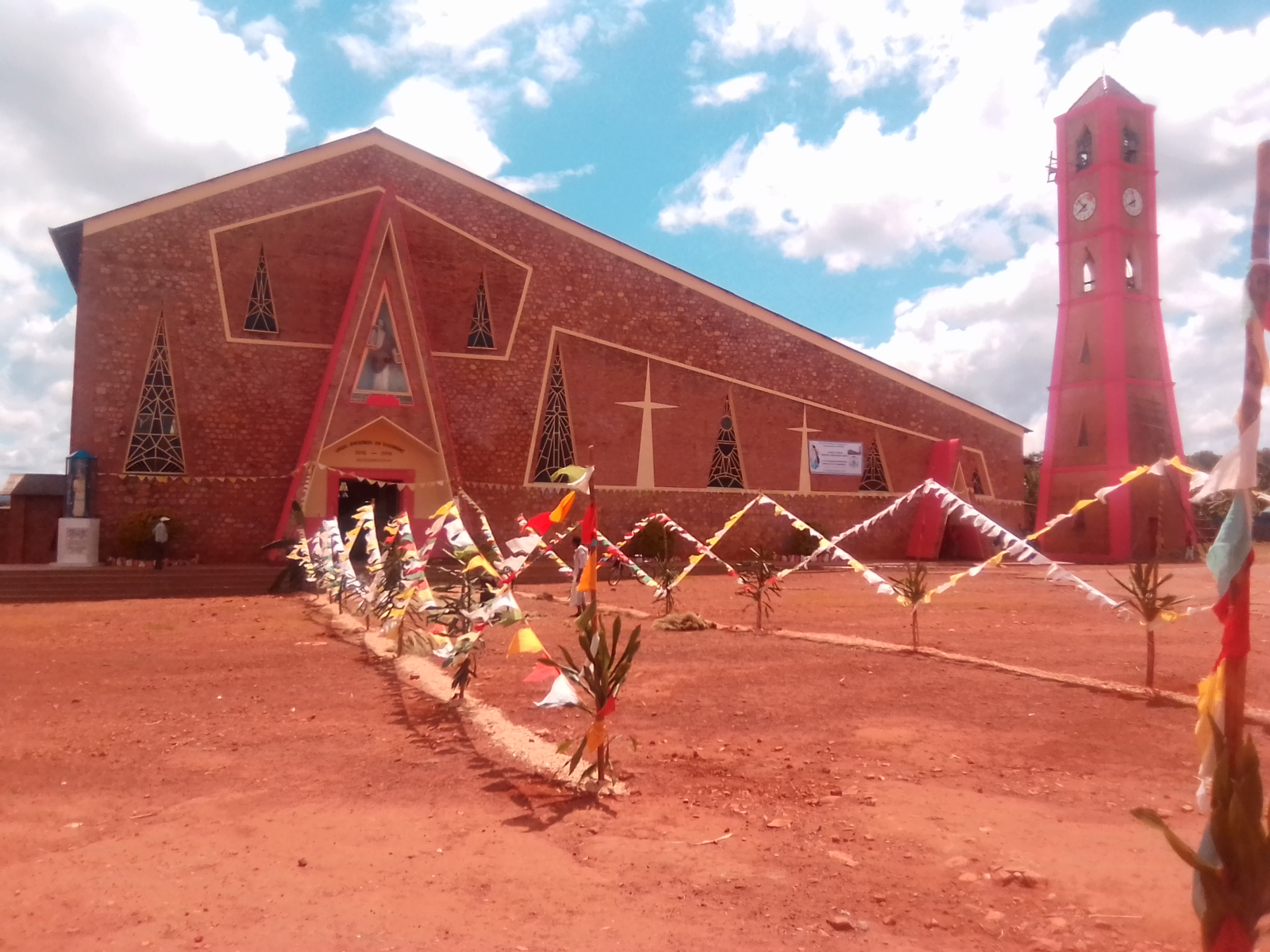
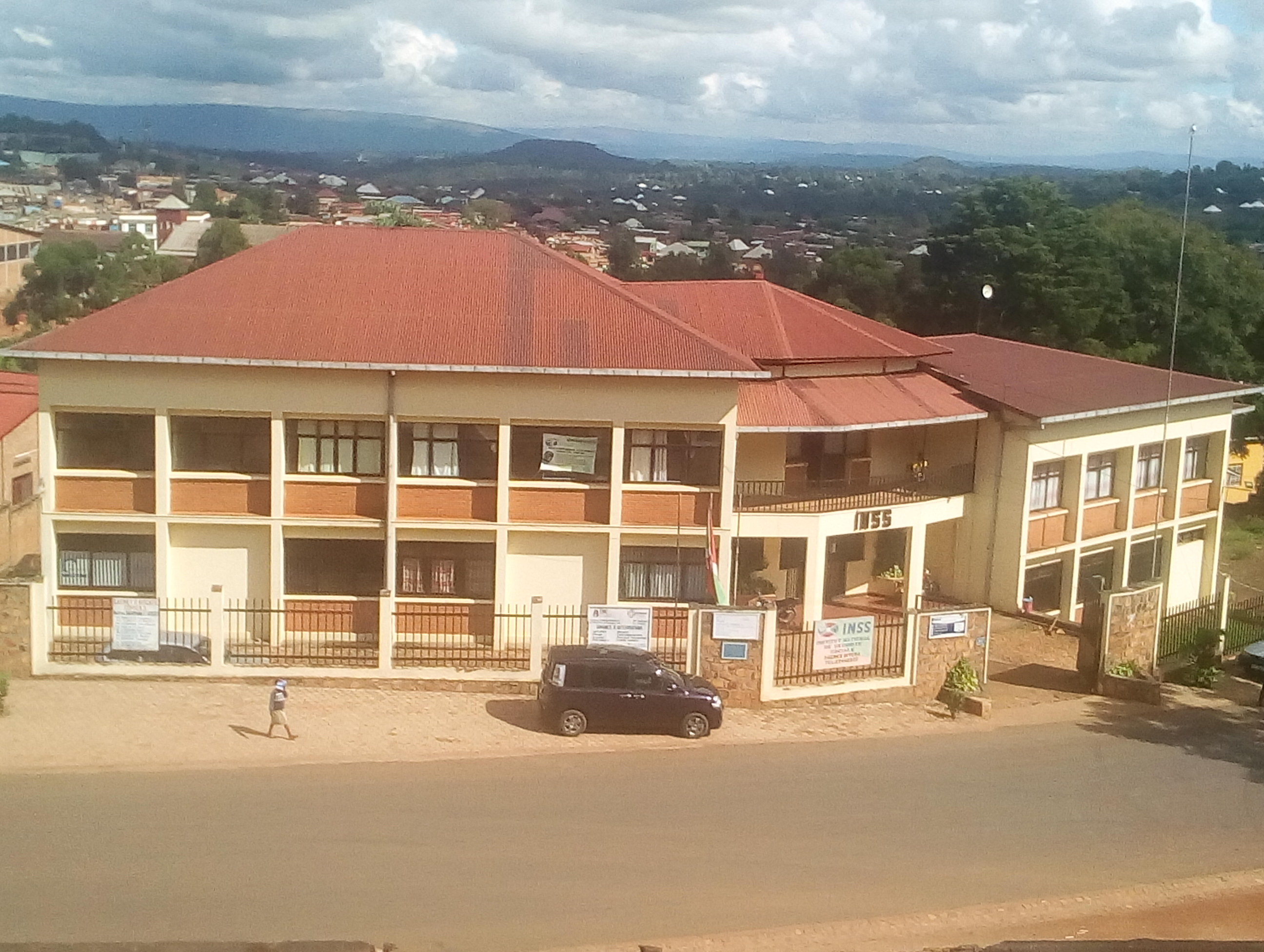
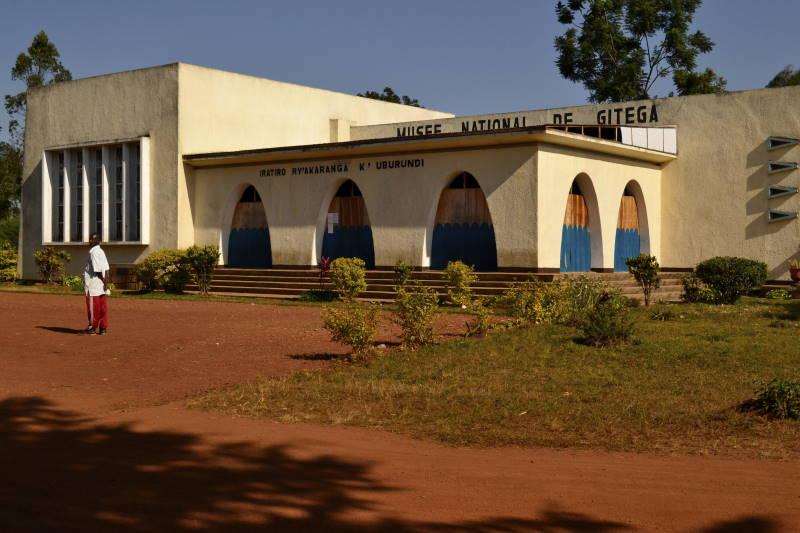
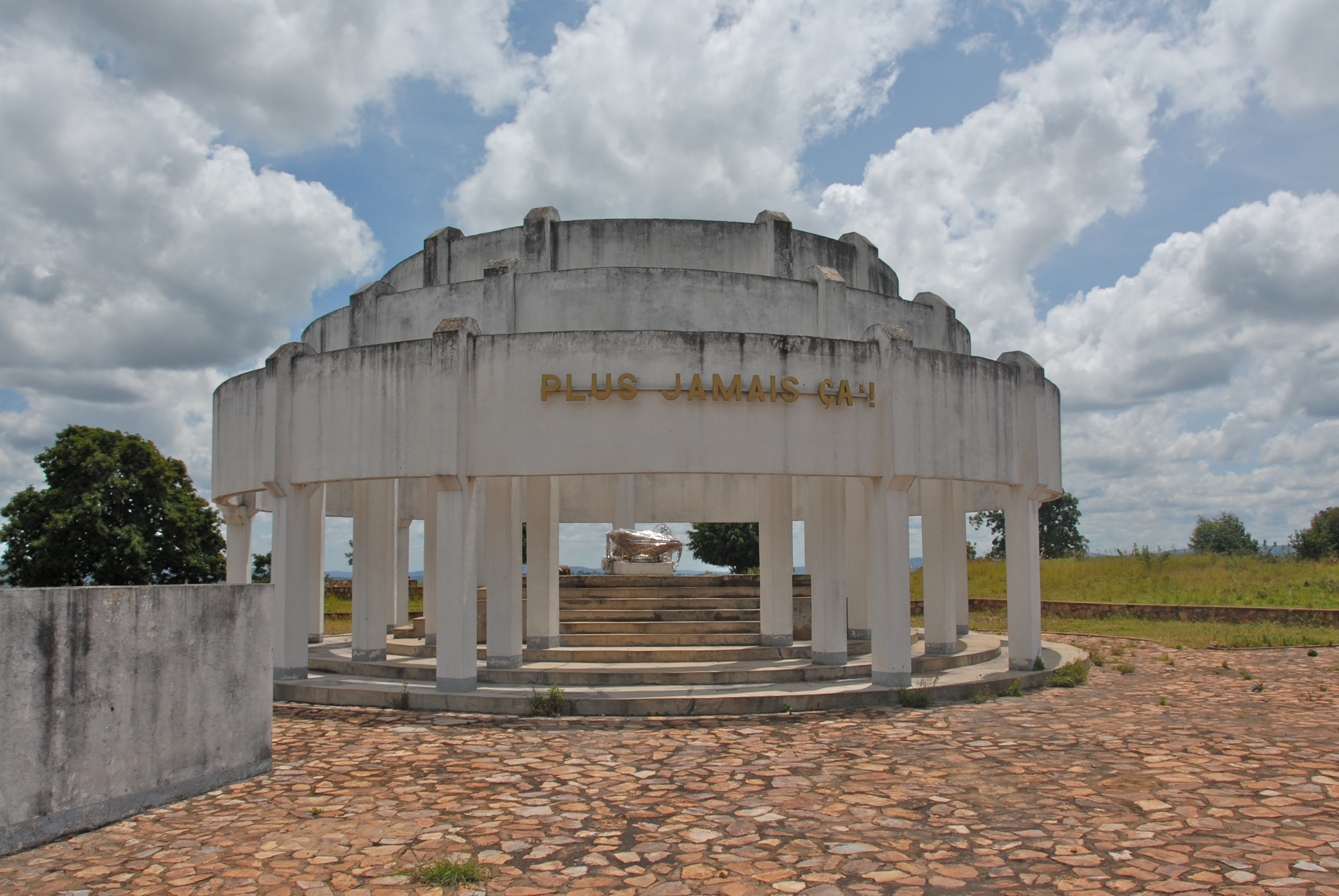
- Top: Gitega skyline; Middle: Cathedral of Christ the King, Downtown Gitega; National Museum of Gitega, Kibimba School Memorial

- Location of Gitega in Burundi

- Location in Burundi Gitega (Africa)
- Coordinates: 03°25′42″S 29°55′30″E
- Country: Burundi
- Province: Gitega Province

Area
  - Capital city: 22 km^{2} (8.5 sq mi)
  - Urban: 22 km^{2} (8.5 sq mi)
  - Metro: 27 km^{2} (10 sq mi)
- Elevation: 1,504 m (4,934 ft)

Population (2020)
  - Capital city: 135,467
  - Density: 6,200/km^{2} (16,000/sq mi)
- Time zone: UTC+02:00 (CAT)
- Climate: Cwb

Gitega (French pronunciation: [ɡiteɡa]), formerly Kitega, is the political capital of Burundi. Located in the centre of the country, in the Burundian central plateau roughly 62 kilometres (39 mi) east of Bujumbura, the largest city and former political capital, Gitega is the country's fourth largest city and former royal capital of the Kingdom of Burundi until its abolition in 1966. (Note: From 1922 on, Usumbura (now Bujumbura) acted as a second, colonial, administrative and economic capital of the country; it effectively became its only political capital between the abolition of the monarchy in 1966 and January 2019.) In December 2018, then-President of Burundi Pierre Nkurunziza announced that he would follow on a 2007 promise to return Gitega its former political capital status, with Bujumbura remaining as economic capital and centre of commerce. A vote in the Parliament of Burundi made the change official on 16 January 2019, with all branches of government expected to move in over three years.

== Geography ==
Gitega is the capital of Gitega Province, one of the eighteen provinces of Burundi. It is located in the center of the country, at roughly the same distance between the commercial capital, Bujumbura on Lake Tanganyika to the west, the Tanzanian border to the east—both at around 62 kilometres (39 mi)—and the Rwandan border, about 72 kilometres (45 mi) to the north. It lies on a broad plateau surrounded by hills, a few kilometres southwest of the confluence of the Ruvyironza and Rurubu Rivers. Ruvubu National Park, the country's biggest, lies 26 kilometres (16 mi) to the east.

== Climate ==
Climate data for Gitega (1991–2020)
Month	Jan	Feb	Mar	Apr	May	Jun	Jul	Aug	Sep	Oct	Nov	Dec	Year
Record high °C (°F)	35.0 (95.0)	35.4 (95.7)	32.0 (89.6)	31.3 (88.3)	30.1 (86.2)	30.8 (87.4)	30.7 (87.3)	31.7 (89.1)	32.6 (90.7)	32.9 (91.2)	31.8 (89.2)	33.8 (92.8)	35.4 (95.7)
Mean daily maximum °C (°F)	27.6 (81.7)	27.5 (81.5)	27.1 (80.8)	26.4 (79.5)	25.9 (78.6)	26.7 (80.1)	27.3 (81.1)	28.1 (82.6)	28.4 (83.1)	27.5 (81.5)	26.6 (79.9)	27.0 (80.6)	27.2 (81.0)
Daily mean °C (°F)	21.9 (71.4)	21.8 (71.2)	21.6 (70.9)	21.5 (70.7)	21.1 (70.0)	21.2 (70.2)	21.3 (70.3)	22.3 (72.1)	22.4 (72.3)	21.8 (71.2)	21.3 (70.3)	21.6 (70.9)	21.6 (70.9)
Mean daily minimum °C (°F)	16.1 (61.0)	16.0 (60.8)	16.1 (61.0)	16.5 (61.7)	16.4 (61.5)	15.7 (60.3)	15.3 (59.5)	16.4 (61.5)	16.4 (61.5)	16.2 (61.2)	15.9 (60.6)	16.1 (61.0)	16.1 (61.0)
Record low °C (°F)	12.9 (55.2)	12.9 (55.2)	12.8 (55.0)	14.0 (57.2)	13.6 (56.5)	11.6 (52.9)	11.3 (52.3)	12.5 (54.5)	13.0 (55.4)	12.9 (55.2)	12.7 (54.9)	13.1 (55.6)	11.3 (52.3)
Average precipitation mm (inches)	99.8 (3.93)	96.7 (3.81)	142.9 (5.63)	142.4 (5.61)	107.7 (4.24)	44.7 (1.76)	10.4 (0.41)	39.2 (1.54)	88.0 (3.46)	109.4 (4.31)	192.1 (7.56)	185.3 (7.30)	1,258.8 (49.56)
Average precipitation days (≥ 1.0 mm)	7.3	7.4	12.5	15.5	11.1	1.8	0.6	2.4	6.9	13.4	17.3	14.1	110.1
Source: NOAA

== History ==
Gitega was at one time the seat of the Kingdom of Burundi and remained as capital of the kings of Burundi (mwami) until 1966.

The Germans laid out the plan for the modern town of Gitega in 1912 when Burundi was part of German East Africa.

In March 2007, President of Burundi Pierre Nkurunziza announced that Burundi was planning to bring back its capital city to Gitega, saying that it is in a better location for a capital than Bujumbura.

On 24 December 2018, it was announced by Nkurunziza that Gitega was to become the capital city of Burundi, pending only Parliament approval. The expected parliamentary assent (given the President's CNDD-FFD party comfortable majority in both chambers) arrived through a vote on 16 January 2019, with some ministries already starting the move two days later.

On 7 December 2021, a fire broke out in an overcrowded prison in Gitega, killing at least 38 and injuring more than 69.

== Education ==
The Polytechnic University of Gitega was founded in 2014.

== Culture ==
It is the home of Burundi's National Museum of Gitega. Several karyenda royal drum sanctuaries are located in the area, as well as the ibwami (royal court). On 29 April 1972, Ntare V of Burundi, the country's last Mwami (King), was killed in Gitega.

== Places of worship ==
Places of worship in Gitega are predominantly Christian churches and cathedrals, including: Roman Catholic Archdiocese of Gitega (Catholic Church), Province of the Anglican Church of Burundi (Anglican Communion), Union of Baptist Churches in Burundi (Baptist World Alliance), and Assemblies of God. There are also Muslim mosques.

== Transportation ==
Gitega was served by Gitega Airport, which is now defunct. Gitega is served by four National Roads (Routes Nationales, RN): RN2 connects it with Bujumbura through the northwest, via Muramvya and Bujumbura Rural provinces. RN15 leads to the north of country, towards Ngozi and continuing on to Rwanda, while passing through the ancient royal court of Gishora; RN12, which separates from RN15 on the outskirts of Gitega, heads northeast to serve the provinces of Karuzi and Muyinga. The last is RN3, which heads towards the southwest towards Rumonge and Lake Tanganyika.

== See also ==
- Commune of Gitega
- Category:People from Gitega
