= July 1966 Burundian coup d'état =

July 1966 coup d'état in Burundi

- Location of Burundi in Central Africa
- Date: 8 July 1966
- Location: Bujumbura, Kingdom of Burundi
- Type: Military coup
- Cause: Ethnic tensions between Hutu and Tutsi; Perceived moderate tendencies of Mwambutsa IV in balancing Hutu and Tutsi demands in government
- Motive: Regime change
- Target: Royal Palace, Bujumbura
- Organised by: Crown Prince Charles Ndizeye; Michel Micombero
- Outcome: Coup succeeds: Mwambutsa IV is ousted by his son, Crown Prince Charles Ndizeye, who acceded to the throne as Ntare V; Michel Micombero is promoted to the post of Prime Minister by Ntare V, replacing ousted Léopold Biha

On 8 July 1966, a coup d'état took place in the Kingdom of Burundi. The second in Burundi's post-independence history, the coup ousted the government loyal to the king (mwami) of Burundi, Mwambutsa IV, who had gone into exile in October 1965 after the failure of an earlier coup attempt.

== Background ==
The first coup attempt had been led by members of the Hutu ethnic group and was provoked by rising ethnic tensions between the Hutu and Burundi's Tutsi ruling class. The July 1966 coup was an extreme Tutsi counter-reaction against what they saw as Mwambutsa's dangerous moderate tendencies in trying to balance Hutu and Tutsi demands in government.

== Events ==
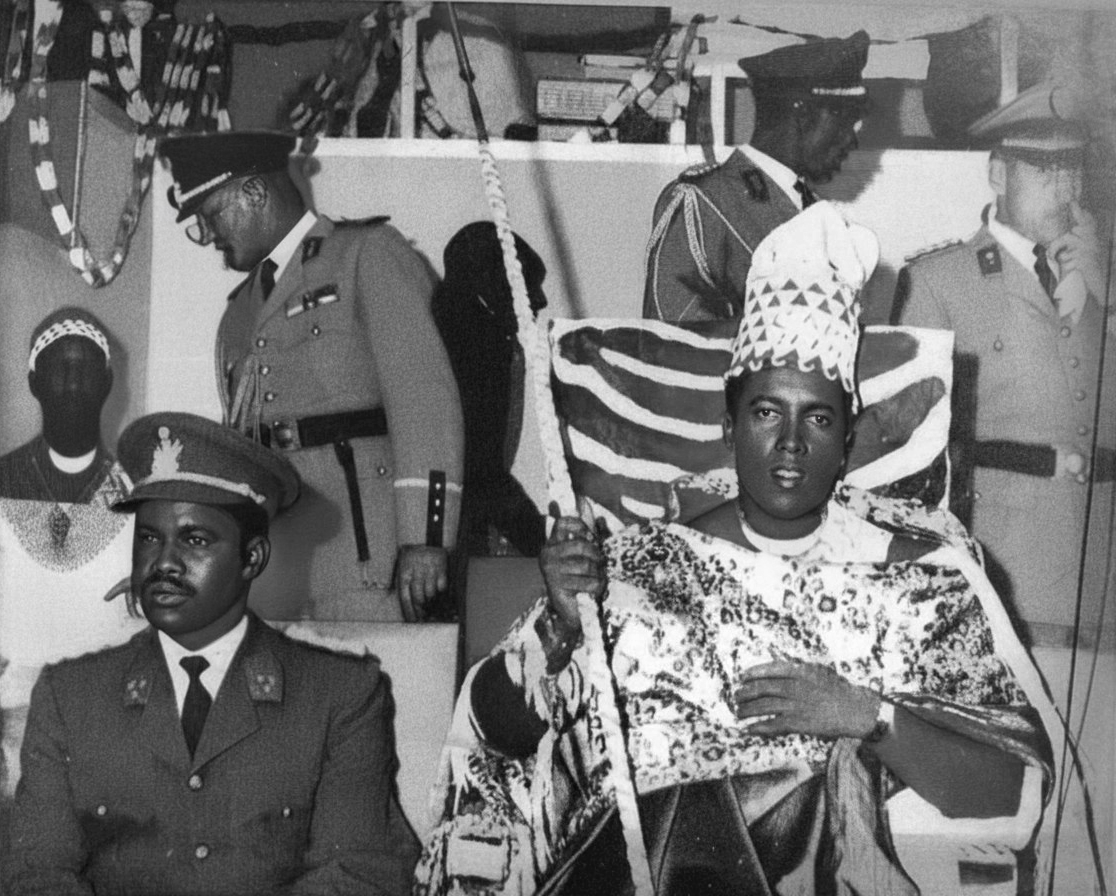
Ntare V (right) and Michel Micombero (left), pictured at the coronation ceremony of Ntare V two months following the coup

On 24 March 1966, shortly after going into exile, Mwambutsa had delegated his royal powers to his son, the 18-year-old Crown Prince Charles Ndizeye. On 8 July 1966, forces loyal to Ndizeye overthrew the pro-Mwambutsa government of Prime Minister Léopold Biha. Ndizeye announced that he was assuming the role of head of state of Burundi. He suspended the constitution, dismissed Biha, and asked the 26-year-old Captain Michel Micombero, a Tutsi army officer who had played a major role in the coup, to form a new government. On 12 July, Micombero's government was installed with himself as prime minister. On 1 September, Ndizeye had himself crowned as Mwami Ntare V. Ntare promised to Burundi strong leadership, anti-corruption measures, and a new constitution.

However, tension developed between Ntare, who wanted to actively rule as a monarch, and Micombero's government, which had aligned itself to reform and saw little need for an involved king.

== Aftermath ==
Less than five months later, Micombero led a third coup d'etat on 28 November which ousted Ntare. Micombero abolished Burundi's monarchy and declared the nation a republic. This allowed Micombero to establish a military dictatorship with UPRONA as the only legal party, which would last until his own overthrow in a military coup in 1976. Ntare V fled into exile but returned to the country from Uganda in 1972, at which time he was assassinated under circumstances that have yet to be fully explained.

== Works cited ==
- Lemarchand, René (1970). Rwanda and Burundi. New York: Praeger Publishers. OCLC 254366212.
- Lemarchand, René (1995). Burundi: Ethnic Conflict and Genocide. New York: Woodrow Wilson Center Press. ISBN 0-521-45176-0. OCLC 502218720.
- Melady, Thomas (1974). Burundi: The Tragic Years. Maryknoll, N.Y.: Orbis Books. ISBN 0-88344-045-8. OCLC 2680717.
