= Mwezi I of Burundi =

Mwezi I Ndagushimiye was the king of Burundi from 1709 to 1739. He was the successor of Ntare I of Burundi and the second king of the kingdom.

Regnal titles
Preceded by Ntare I	King of Burundi; 1709–1739	Succeeded by Mutaga III
