= Esther Kamatari =

- Princess of Burundi
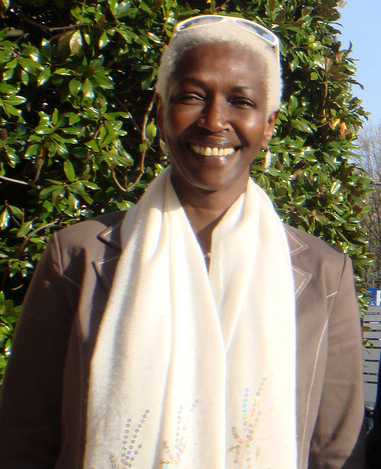
- Esther Kamatari in 2009.
- Born: 30 November 1951 (age 74); Bujumbura, Ruanda-Urundi
- Spouse: Peter Bassez; Gilles Herbulot
- Issue: from first marriage: Frédérique Bassez, Kamatari Wilson Lixon , from second marriage: Jade Herbulot Kamatari; Arthur Herbulot Kamatari
- House: Ntwero
- Father: Prince Ignace Kamatari
- Mother: Agrippine
- Occupation: model, writer, artist

Princess Esther Kamatari (born 30 November 1951 in Bujumbura) is a writer, model, and exiled Burundian princess.

== Biography ==
Esther Kamatari grew up in Burundi as a member of the royal family. She was educated at l'Ecole Nationale d'Administration du Burundi. Following independence in 1962, the king was overthrown in a military coup d'état, and the monarchy abolished in 1966. Kamatari fled the country in 1970 after her father's assassination and settled in Paris, where she became the first African model in France. An attempt to re-establish the kingdom ended with the murder of King Ntare V in 1972.

Burundi's post-independence history has been dominated by tensions between the Hutu majority and the Tutsi minority. The civil war of the 1990s in Burundi and conflicts with neighbouring countries and the plight of thousands of child-victims of war led her to become involved with the Association of the People of Burundi in France. In Burundi she is known for her humanitarian work.

A peace brokered by South Africa has made elections possible in Burundi, and Esther Kamatari and her Abahuza party, which means "bringing people together," will run on the platform of restoration of the monarchy.

== Marriage and children ==
Esther is married to a French man named Gilles. He is a doctor. They have two children, Jade and Arthur. Esther already had a daughter, Frédérique.

== Patronages ==
- President of Burundian Association in France (since 1990).

== Honours ==
Foreign honours

- Knight of the National Order of the Lion (Republic of Senegal, 14 August 2002).

== Publications ==
- Kamatari, E. and Renault, M. 2001. Princesse des Rugo, mon histoire. Bayard, ISBN 2-227-13914-5

== See also ==
- List of African writers (by country)#Burundi
