= Ntare II of Burundi =

Ntare IV Rutaganzwa Rugamba (c. 1796 – c. 1850) was the king of Burundi. He was the son of king Mwambutsa I Mbariza and Msabiyije, a wife from the influential Bashoka Tutsi clan. The early years of his reign began with a regency, which was common in Burundian royal history.

Under Ntare IV, the Kingdom of Burundi reached the peak of its political and economic power in the pre-colonial period. He carried out a large-scale territorial expansion, doubling the size of the state and bringing its borders closer to modern ones: successful military campaigns, including against Rwanda, allowed the kingdom to strengthen its position in the region. Ntare IV centralized power by subordinating local chiefs (basigaba) to the central administration and creating an effective tribute collection system. He reformed the army, forming a permanent military force (ibikanga), which ensured border security and control of trade routes along Lake Tanganyika. Economic growth under him was based on the development of agriculture. The streamlining of the traditional ubugabire system (patron‑client relations) ensured the stability of economic processes and social consolidation. After the death of Ntare IV, civil strife began in the country, which weakened the state in the long run and facilitated colonial penetration at the end of the 19th century.

Regnal titles
Preceded by Mwambutsa I	King of Burundi; 1796–1850	Succeeded by Mwezi IV
