= Mwezi IV of Burundi =

King of Burundi

Mwezi IV Gisabo

King of Burundi
- Reign: 1850 – August 1908
- Predecessor: Ntare IV
- Successor: Mutaga IV
- Born: c. 1840; Kingdom of Burundi
- Died: August 1908; Kingdom of Burundi, German East Africa
- Spouse: Ntibanyiha
- Issue: Mutaga IV of Burundi; Nandabunga
Names
- Mwezi IV Mbikije
- Dynasty: Abaganwa
- Father: Ntare IV of Burundi

King Mwami Mwezi IV Gisabo Bikata-Bijoga (c. 1840–1908) was the last independent ruler of Burundi before its colonization by the German Empire.

== Biography ==
He ascended to the throne in 1850 after succeeding his father. Ntare IV Rutaganzwa Rugamba who was the King of Burundi until 1850. Mwezi IV would continue to reign up until his death in 1908, when he would be succeeded by his son Mutaga IV Mbikije.

=== Pre-colonisation reign ===
In his position as king of Burundi, he was seen as the ‘Father’ of the Nation, a figure seen as more religious than political, who was revered as a mystical figure. Mwezi was one of the younger sons of Ntare, he came to power under the regency of his older brother, and there was some question of his own parentage. This would end up leading to a struggle with his older brothers in order to retain his claim to kingship. During the more than fifty-year reign of King Mwezi IV, a four-tiered system of administration emerged in order to help govern the country of Burundi more effectively. A central area around the Muramvya Province was under the direct control of the king; an area under the administration of his sons or brothers, which was most closely allied to him; a broad area further east and south that was administered by Batare chiefs, who were descendants of Ntare IV of Burundi: and a final zone that covered the west and northwestern areas of the country and was under the administration of other, mostly Hutu authorities. This method of leadership ended up in multiple revolts in attempts to overthrow Mwezi Gisabo, with the principal actors in these revolts often being the sons and grandsons of Ndivyariye, an older brother of Mwezi Gisabo. The issue of governance in Burundi concerned the ways in which the society was governed and how it was presently governed, the distribution of the contested authority and resources in the society, and most importantly to what level of degree were the political leaders seen as a legitimate leader with authority in the eyes of Burundian society. The sources of power in Burundi had always been authority, human resources, skills and knowledge, intangible psychological and ideological factors, and material resources and sanctions, and when legitimacy of a leader did not exist or was thrown into doubt, the result was political turmoil and social unrest. Mwezi IV was forced to control a number of new forms of political intrusion that threatened to undermine his power as king and his control over Burundi. He was forced to deal with attacks by African actors from the east (such as Mirambo), as well as threats from the commercial power associated with the east coast Swahili networks, and direct European intervention in his country. In 1884 he led the Burundian army in battle against slave traders led by Rumaliza along the Kivu-Tanganyika road, inflicting a major defeat upon his opponents and stopping their incursion into Burundi.

=== German colonisation and continued rule ===
There were some Burundian figures that allied themselves with the German colonial empire in exchange for their help seizing King Mwezi. The powerful individuals that betrayed their king were to be rewarded with important or prominent administrative positions that had political power of their own, the most prominent of these being Inanga Maconco. Maconco was originally the son-in-law of Mwezi, who became an early ally to him after marrying one of Mwezi's daughters. After she died, Maconco allied himself with the German forces as they sought to capture Mwezi, and in exchange the Germans promised him a prominent administrative position. However, he was arrested and hanged by the Germans after he was accused of stealing a gun. The German forces along with some of the Burundi that had allied themselves with the Europeans, including Maconco, drove Mwezi from his compound and were able to force him into an agreement. The contents of this 1890 agreement were that King Mwezi be forced to recognize German authority, respect the presence of foreign missionaries, and accept the administrative authority of German allies (such as those who betrayed him like Maconco) in certain areas. However, in exchange for this, the Germans would support Mwezi as the continued King of Burundi. The year 1890 would also see the country of Burundi, along with Rwanda and Tanganyika, become part of the German East Africa. Although this occurred under the reign of Mwezi, the German Protectorate of East Africa was a short-lived venture for the Germans, as they ended up losing all of their colonies, Burundi included, as one of the consequences resulting from World War I.

== Works cited ==
- Weinstein, Warren (1976). Historical Dictionary of Burundi. Metuchen: Scarecrow Press. ISBN 9780810809628.

Regnal titles
Preceded by Ntare IV	King of Burundi; 1850–1908	Succeeded by Mutaga IV
