= Ntare I of Burundi =

First king of Burundi

Ntare I Kivimira Savuyimba Semunganzashamba Rushatsi Cambarantama was the Mwami of Burundi from 1675 to 1709. He was a legendary descendant of the Ntwero family, and the first king of Burundi. His mother's name was Inanjonaki.

Ntare established the Sentare, a tribunal of judges to handle property disputes between chiefs.

There are two main founding legends for Burundi. Both suggest that the nation was founded by a man named Cambarantama. A legend says it originated in Rwanda. The other version, more common in precolonial Burundi, says it originates from the southern state of Buha.

To celebrate the king, the film "NTARE RUSHATSI, The Lion and the Sheep" was created by Burundian director Nifasha Florian in 2019.

The official state house of Burundi was also named after him.

== Sources ==
- Eggers, Ellen K. (2006). Historical Dictionary of Burundi. Scarecrow Press. ISBN 978-0-8108-5302-7.
- Weinstein, Warren (1976). Historical Dictionary of Burundi. Metuchen: Scarecrow Press. ISBN 9780810809628.

Regnal titles
Preceded by -	King of Burundi; 1680–1709	Succeeded by Mwezi III
