= Kingdom of Burundi =

Bantu kingdom in southeast Africa (c. 1680 to 1966)

Kingdom of Burundi Ubwami bw'Urundi (Kirundi) Koninkrijk Boeroendi (Flemish) Royaume du Burundi (French) Königreich Burundi (German)
- c. 1680–1966
- Flag (1962–1966) Coat of arms (1962–1966)
- Motto: Imana, Umwami, Uburundi; Dieu, le Roi et le Burundi "God, the King and Burundi"
- Anthem: Burundi Bwacu (Kirundi); Our Burundi
- Territory of the Kingdom of Burundi in 1966.
- Status: Independent state (1680–1890); Part of German East Africa (1890–1916); Part of Ruanda-Urundi (1916–1962); Independent state (1962–1966)
- Capital: Gitega; Bujumbura
- Common languages: Kirundi; French; German (official from 1890–1916); Flemish (official from 1916–1962)
- Religion: Burundian traditional religion, Catholicism, Protestantism, Islam
- Government: Parliamentary constitutional monarchy (1962–1966)
- Mwami
  - c. 1680–1709: Ntare I (first)
  - 1966: Ntare V (last)
- Prime Minister
  - 1961: Joseph Cimpaye (first)
  - 1966: Michel Micombero (last)
- Legislature: Parliament (from 1962)
  - Upper house: Senate (from 1962)
  - Lower house: National Assembly (from 1962)
- History
  - Established: c. 1680
  - German East Africa: 1 July 1890
  - Formation of Ruanda-Urundi: 20 July 1922
  - Autonomy: 21 December 1961
  - Independence: 1 July 1962
  - Republic declared: 28 November 1966

Population
  - c. 1890: c. 1,000,000
- Currency: Shell money (16th–19th centuries); German East African rupie (1890–1916); Belgian Congo franc (1916–1960); Ruanda-Urundi franc (1960–1964); Burundian franc (from 1964)
Succeeded by
Republic of Burundi
- Today part of: Burundi

The Kingdom of Burundi (French: Royaume du Burundi), also known as Kingdom of Urundi (Kirundi: Ubwami bw'Urundi), was a Bantu kingdom in the modern-day Republic of Burundi. The Ganwa monarchs (with the title of mwami) ruled over both Hutus and Tutsis. Created in the 16th century, the kingdom was preserved under German and Belgian colonial rule in the late 19th and early 20th century and was an independent state between 1962 and 1966.

== History ==
=== Early history and expansion ===
The date of the foundation of the Kingdom of Burundi is unknown, and the exact context of the state's foundation are disputed. The region was originally inhabited by Twa hunter-gatherers before the influx of Bantu farmers from about the 11th century. The valleys and hills became home to a patchwork of farmers, fishermen, and foragers. Pastoralists (associated with cattle) arrived in waves. Based on societal and oral traditions, it is generally believed that the region's pastoralists were the ancestors of the later Tutsi ethnic group, while the agriculturalists became the Hutus, however the exact origins of Burundi's ethnic groups remain unclear and disputed. Many local and regional dynasties developed, eventually coalescing around two political centres; one in the north and one in the south.

The Kingdom of Burundi was founded by first mwami Ntare I (r. c.1680–1705), who unified the two centres; the commonly accepted founding date is 1680. There are differing versions of Burundian oral history. In all versions, Ntare brings rain and ends a famine. According to the "Kanyaru cycle", Ntare's royal clan and its associates were related to Rwanda's royal family, and had migrated from Rwanda to Burundi; in turn, this royal clan might have originally been Hima pastoralists from southern Ethiopia. Another telling of the events, provided by the "Nkoma cycle" suggests that the state's founders were ethnic Hutu and had migrated from Buha (modern Kigoma Region) to Nkoma before arriving in Burundi. The Nkoma traditions are found across the country, while Kanyaru traditions are more localised, official, and possibly influenced by the Hamitic hypothesis, leading scholars to lend more credence to the Nkoma traditions. (Note: The Kanyaru cycle focuses on the extreme north, while the Nkoma cycle focuses on the central and southern regions. According to Jean-Pierre Chrétien the Kanyaru cycle evolved during the colonial period, and sought to link Burundi to Rwanda. In Rwanda and Burundi, the Hamitic hypothesis was associated with assumption that the local kingdoms had been founded by Ethiopian or Nilotic migrants from the north, a belief popularized by colonial figures and elements of the Tutsi elite. From the start, the hypothesis was racially charged, and was thus gradually rejected by scholars and later in public, especially in Rwanda. René Lemarchand described the Hamitic hypothesis as "totally discredited" in 1996, though admitted that it was still considered possible by "Burundi scholars of Hutu extraction". In contrast, researcher Helmut Strizek argued in 2006 that neutral research on the possible migratory origin of the Tutsi had become nearly impossible due to the ideological conflicts surrounding the Hamitic hypothesis, even though modern scholars had proposed theories about a north-south migration of the Hima people, an ethnic group related to the Tutsi.)

Under Ntare I, Burundi expanded and annexed a number of surrounding polities. Over time, his royal clan became separated from both the Tutsis as well as the Hutus, becoming known as the Ganwa and regarded as a de facto separate group. While many linked the origins of the royal clan to the Hutu, status-wise the Ganwa were more closely associated with the Tutsi. As a result of the Ganwa being neither Tutsi nor Hutu, the clan was able to keep the loyalty of both ethnic groups. The head of the Ganwa and ruler of Burundi was known as the mwami; however, the kingdom was extensively decentralised. Succession struggles were also common. Over time, four important lineages emerged in the Ganwa, namely the Bezi, Batare, Bataga, and Bambutsa, with each lineage tracing its origin to a king. These lineages struggled for control, and their infighting became one of the major sources of conflict within Burundi.

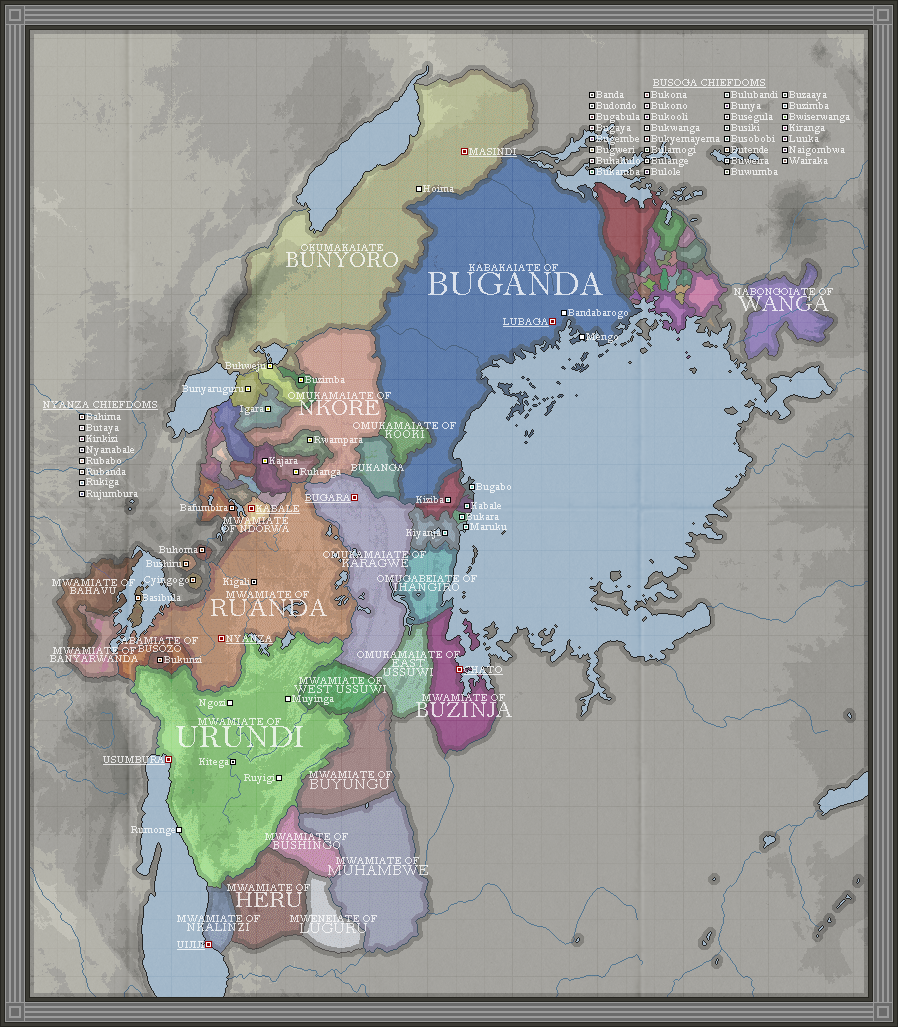
The kingdoms of the African Great Lakes, c. 1880. Burundi is marked in light green.

After this early period of consolidation, Burundi was limited in its ability to expand due to bordering at other, more powerful states. In the early 19th century, however, the Kingdom of Burundi experienced an increase in power. Ntare IV (r. c.1795–1852) was able to conquer several smaller kingdoms as well as areas which later became part of Rwanda and Tanzania. Together with the Kingdom of Rwanda, he conquered and divided the Bugesera kingdom. By 1850, the kingdom's borders had taken a form which largely overlap with the modern state of Burundi. However, Ntare IV's decisions regarding his succession greatly affected the monarchy, as he appointed his sons as the administrators of the newly conquered territories. His sons, constituting the Batare lineage, became powerful nobles and dominated northern Burundi in the next decades. Ntare IV's heir, Mwezi IV of Burundi (r. 1852–1908) fought with his siblings for control, but ultimately only managed to maintain control of half of Burundi. The rest remained under the control of his brothers and their descendants. Regardless, his attempts to curb their power and partially successful efforts to take away their large landholdings led to a lasting resentment of the Batare toward Mwezi IV. In turn, Mwezi IV granted his numerous sons their own large fiefs, and they formed the powerful Bezi lineage. As a result, the Batare and Bezi became fierce rivals and continued to fight for control over the kingdom over the next decades.

In the 1880s, Arab slave traders loyal to Rumaliza encroached on Burundian territory, but the state managed to fend off their raids in a series of conflicts. One of the greatest successes of Mwezi IV was a major victory over Zanzibari slave traders in a battle at Rumonge. This clash resulted in no slaves ever being taken or traded in Burundi, contrasting to surrounding regions which heavily suffered under slave raids.

=== European contacts and German domination ===
The first European explorers to reach Burundi were Richard Francis Burton and John Hanning Speke in 1858, followed by Henry Morton Stanley and David Livingstone in 1871. Mwezi IV of Burundi was wary of the Europeans, resisting initial attempts by Christian missionaries to proselytize the population. When three Christian missionaries of the Catholic White Fathers came to the state in 1881, they were murdered. In 1890, Burundi was assigned to the German colonial empire as part of German East Africa, but was not effectively occupied or controlled by the colonial power. Mwezi IV initially refused to acknowledge German rule, and demonstratively rejected outside influences, even including cotton clothing. Besides establishing a military post in the area in 1896, Germany mainly opted to rule indirectly through the mwami, alternating between strengthening and limiting the power of the Burundian monarchy. In 1899, a Christian mission station was founded at Mugera, a traditionally holy location and site of the royal necropolis, despite Mwezi IV's protests.

Around 1900, an "anti-king" of mysterious origin called Kilima appeared in northern Burundi, using discontent among the local Hutu peasants to challenge the Burundian monarchy and establish his own fiefdom. Kilima led several massacres of Tutsis, and eventually managed to gain the support of first the Germans and later the Belgians, preserving his autonomy. Even though German East African governor Gustav Adolf von Götzen urged the colonial residents in Burundi respect and uphold Mwezi IV's authority, the local German representatives implemented a divide and rule strategy, favoring various opposition figures to weaken the anti-colonial king. From 1902 to 1903, Resident Friedrich Robert von Beringe and Kilima launched an outright military operation against Mwezi IV, defeating his forces in battle and forcing him to accept full submission in the treaty of Ikiganda. Conversely, the treaty recognized the monarch as the rightful ruler of Burundi. Upon learning of the events, Götzen fired Beringe, while Kilima was sent into temporary exile and various anti-royal chiefs were forced to pledge loyalty to Mwezi IV. Regardless, the conflict permanently damaged relations between the German authorities and the Burundians, as both the Burundian court as well as Burundian opposition leaders were left unsure about the changing German politics and thus remained generally mistrustful.

There was little direct impact of the German rule on the country. However, Burundi suffered under a rinderpest outbreak and sleeping sickness epidemic during this period, causing a substantial loss of population and economic hardship. In 1912, German colonial resident Erich von Langenn-Steinkeller moved the seat of the German administration from Usumbura to Gitega, close to the traditional heartland of the Burundian monarchy.

=== World War I and Belgian rule ===
During World War I, Burundi was contested between Germany and the Allies. From 1914, the Ruzizi River marked the frontline in the area; in September 1915, German forces crossed the border and attacked Luvungi in the neighbouring Belgian Congo. After this attack was repelled by the Belgians, the Germans withdrew most of their Schutztruppe forces from the area. From then on, Burundi was only held by the Urundi Company led by Langenn-Steinkeller and the 14th Reserve Company; this garrison consisted of 36 Germans, 250 askari, and 100 Ruga-Ruga. In May 1916, Belgian troops broke through German defenses in Rwanda as part of the early stages of the Tabora offensive, and then turned south to capture Burundi. However, their attempt to capture the local German Schutztruppe garrison failed, as Langenn-Steinkeller's force successfully evaded them and retreated from the region. The Belgians occupied Burundi's capital of Gitega on 17 June 1916. The Burundian monarchy, at the time led by a regency council due to the minority of mwami Mwambutsa IV, officially surrendered to the Belgians ten days later.

As a result of the atrocities committed in the Congo when it had been directly ruled by Leopold II of Belgium, the population of Burundi was generally fearful of the Belgians; though Force Publique troops did not assuage these fears, as they looted and harassed civilians, the Belgian takeover was mostly orderly and its new regime was initially "no harder (nor any easier)" than that of the Germans. The war years exerted a heavy toll on Burundi; locals were conscripted as porters and food requisitioned, resulting in many civilian deaths.

In 1922, Burundi was officially assigned to the Belgian colonial empire (together with the neighbouring Kingdom of Rwanda) as part of Ruanda-Urundi, an international mandate by the League of Nations. The Belgians preserved many of the kingdom's institutions intact, but in contrast to the limited overlordship by Germany, they exerted more control, imposing forced labor and more taxes. They also gradually deposed the country's chiefs and subchiefs. These developments led to increased social conflicts, and a series of peasant uprisings in the 1920s and 1930s. These rebellions targeted both the Belgians as well as the Batare lineage that was seen as being more closely aligned with the colonial power than the Bezi. Furthermore, the Belgians strengthened the division between Hutus and Tutsis, regarding the latter as a superior people and favoring them in the administration. This gave rise to more ethnic tensions. Burundi's economy began to change due to the introduction of coffee farming as well as the widespread implementation of forced labor. There was also greater mobility, and many Burundians migrated to the Congo and Rwanda to seek work. The first motor road was opened in 1932.

=== Independence movement and end of the monarchy ===
Whereas the similar Rwandan monarchy was abolished in a revolution between 1959 and 1961, the Burundian monarchy succeeded in surviving into the post-colonial period. By the early 1960s, Burundi's monarchy still held considerable popular support, both among the Tutsis as well as the Hutus.

After World War II, an independence movement developed in Burundi, In 1946, the United Nations exerted pressure on Belgium to prepare Burundi's independence as well as introduce democratic reforms. From this point, the Belgians began to switch their support from the Tutsi minority to the Hutu majority, favoring the latter's takeover of the future state. The Burundian independence movement was led by Louis Rwagasore, a prince of the Bezi clan and leader of the Union for National Progress (UPRONA). He hoped to avoid the ethnic and social conflicts of Rwanda, and was able to rally both Tutsis as well as Hutus to his cause. However, the Belgian administration was wary of Rwagasore's nationalism. It consequently supported the creation of the Christian Democratic Party (Parti Démocratique Chrétien, PDC) which rejected immediate independence and was regarded as more moderate. Before long, the parties were also drawn into the long-existing conflict among the nobility, as the Bezi backed UPRONA and the Batare supported the PDC.

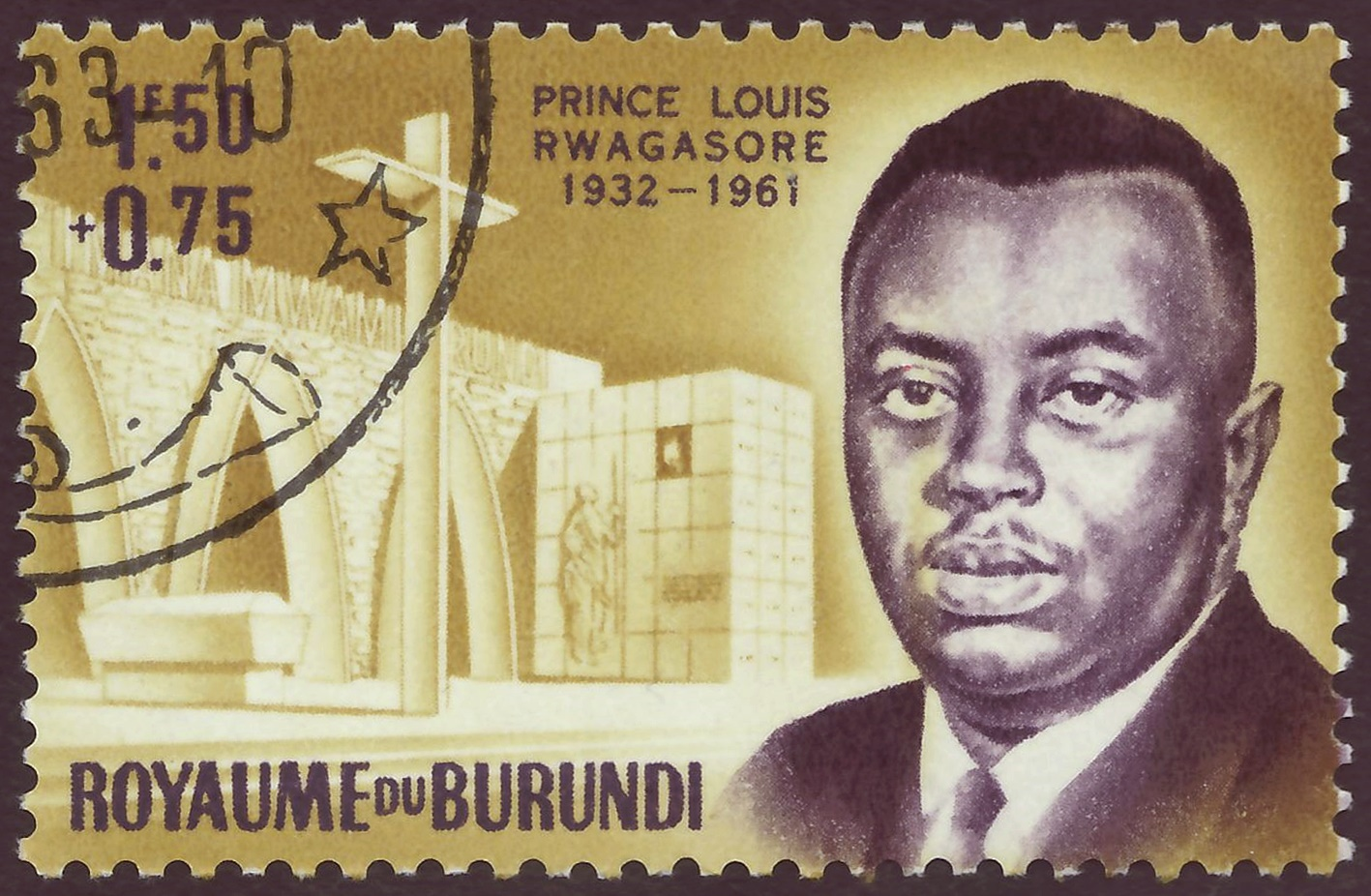
1963 stamp commemorating Louis Rwagasore

Aided by the Belgian authorities which placed Rwagasore under house arrest, the PDC won the country's first municipal elections in November 1960. In the 1961 Burundian legislative election, however, UPRONA achieved a landslide victory. Rwagasore became Prime Minister and assembled a government of national unity to prepare for full independence. His tenure was cut short when he was murdered on 13 October 1961 by his political rivals; the assassination was probably connected to the Batare-Bezi rivalry. Rwagasore's death derailed his attempts to build national inter-ethnic cohesion and facilitated the growth of Hutu-Tutsi tensions which would dominate the remaining years of the Kingdom of Burundi.

In 1962, the Kingdom of Burundi regained its independence as a constitutional monarchy in which the mwami held executive power and legislative power was given to the parliament. By late 1963, the Burundian government allowed Congolese revolutionary Gaston Soumialot to recruit thousands of fighters along the Burundian-Congolese border. Soumialot and his troops consequently participated in the Simba rebellion. Ethnic violence between the Hutu majority and the Tutsi minority rose between 1963 and 1965. This culminated in the murder of Prime Minister Pierre Ngendandumwe, a Hutu, in January 1965. The following legislative elections resulted in a Hutu majority in the National Assembly, but mwami Mwambutsa IV decided to appoint Léopold Biha, one of his confidants and a Ganwa, as the Prime Minister, hoping to maintain the monarchy's power. In response, a failed coup d'état was launched against the monarchy by Hutu officers in October 1965; Mwambutsa IV fled the country and refused to return, even as he claimed to still hold supreme power. The failed coup strengthened radical Tutsis. Mwambutsa's son, Ntare V, attempted to solve the crisis by deposing his father in the July 1966 coup d'état, but was himself ousted from power in a November 1966 coup d'état by his Prime Minister, Michel Micombero, who abolished the monarchy. In March 1972 Ntare returned to Burundi via helicopter from Uganda after years in exile under disputed circumstances. He was immediately detained before eventually being executed at Gitega by government troops the following month.

== Politics and society ==
Crowning of Ntare V, last mwami of Burundi, in 1966

The Kingdom of Burundi was led by the mwami who presided over a large and powerful aristocracy. Before Burundi's colonization, the kingdom was highly decentralized; though this number fluctuated, on average there were 220 powerful noble lineages. The regional elite often held wide independence under the nominal overlordship of the mwami. As a result of the nobility's power as well as the infighting within the royal family, the power of the mwami remained rather limited during the kingdom's existence. In general, the noble and powerful ganwa lineages could autonomously rule their fiefdoms as long as they paid taxes and provided troops to the king in times of war; they often fought each other. However, the mwami were highly respected and revered as the "embodiment of God".

The traditional symbol of the Burundian monarchy were the royal drums. The most important of these instruments was the inkiranya, a holy drum allegedly created by the first mwami. The royal drums were kept at a special sanctuary, guarded by certain Hutu families, and used during festivals, rituals, and royal ceremonies. The flag of the kingdom contained a karyenda drum in the center as a symbol of royal authority.

=== Colonial system ===
After the colonization of Burundi, a series of colonial residents were appointed to oversee the country, first by Germany and then by Belgium. These residents had far-reaching power, and also involved themselves in the internal politics of the kingdom. For instance, resident Langenn-Steinkeller appointed the regency council which governed Burundi during the minority of Mwambutsa IV. However, the resident system never fully functioned during the German rule, as most of the residents held their post only for a short time. Unlike the Germans, the Belgians exerted much more direct control, gradually undermining the traditional government and social structures. The role of the mwami was further reduced to a figurehead, though his administration was still allowed responsibility for customary law and land allocation. Belgian Resident Pierre Ryckmans described the new policy by stating that "the native kings... are the familiar décor that permits us to act behind the scenes without alarming the people". The Belgians also implemented racist policies designed to divide and rule by favoring Tutsis over Hutus, while cementing ethnic divisions by introducing the ethnic origin of Burundians on new identity documents.

=== Demographics, social classes, and ethnic groups ===
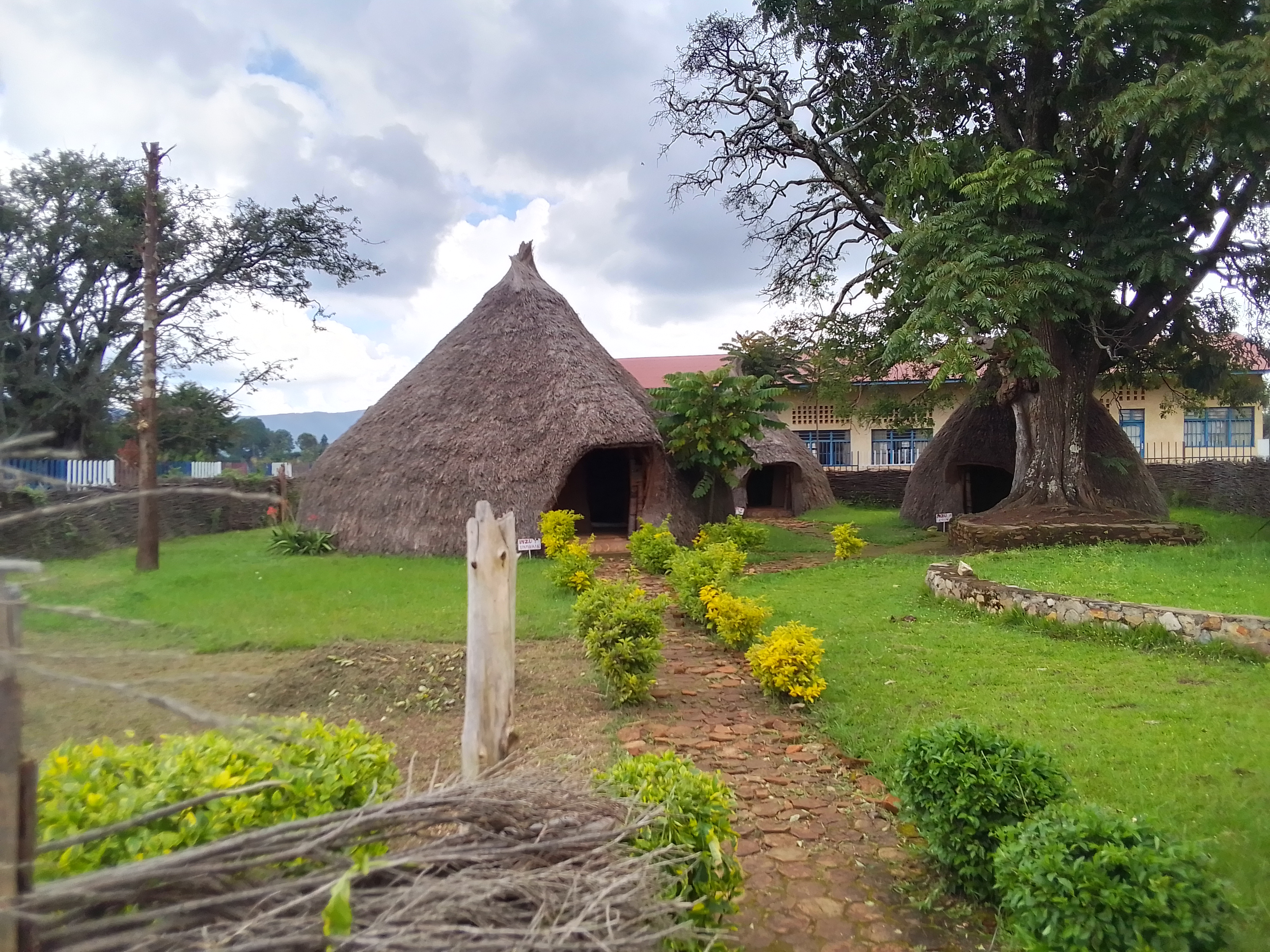
The traditional royal enclosure of Mwambutsa IV of Burundi, penultimate mwami

Historically, Burundi was one of the most populous states of the wider region, with a population of about 1 million people before the colonization. Only the Imbo natural region was sparsely inhabited due to its affliction with malaria. Conversely, the population was not centralized, with Burundians generally settling in small halmets and farmsteads (dubbed rugo) in the middle of their fields and plantations. There were few if any larger villages. Urbanization began in the colonial era, but the halmets remained the most typical form of settlement until the kingdom's end. A systematic "villagization" was only initiated in the later republican period.

The royal clan, the Ganwa (or Baganwa), formed Burundi's leading elite. Though often associated with the Tutsis, the Ganwa constituted a socially, politically, and to some extent ethnically distinct group. Ranking directly below the Ganwa were the Banyamabanga, a prestigious and wealthy social class that assumed important political and ritualist positions at the royal court, the courts of regional leaders, and among the remaining population. The majority of the Banyamabanga belonged to Hutu lineages, most importantly the Bajiji; they were important enough to be involved in the selection processes for the mwami since the 19th century.

The Ganwa and Banyamabanga led the native administration which included the local authorities (Batware), delegates (Vyariho), and arbiters (Bashingantahe); these could be Tutsis or Hutus. The Bashingantahe were important in maintaining peace around Burundi; the posts were granted to "outstanding citizens" who guarded traditions, controlled for good behavior, and resolved interpersonal disputes. The commoners were called Banyagihugu, including all who held no official positions, worked for their basic subsistence, and were required to provide tribute and serve as soldiers in war. The Banyagihugu were further divided into agriculturalists (birimizi), pastoralists (borozi), and artisans (banyamyuga). The majority of the birimizi were Hutus, while most Tutsis lived as borozi, though Hutu agriculturalists also often possessed cattle and Tutsi pastoralists grew crops. Generally, there was little hard distinction between Hutus and Tutsis during much of the kingdom's history. In fact, the Hima subgroup of the Tutsi was regarded as less prestigious than both the Ruguru-Tutsis and the Hutus; while the Ganwa intermarried with Rugurus and Hutus, they would not take Hima spouses. Marriages between Tutsi and Hutu were quite common. The bottom of the social hierarchy was formed by the Twa who lived as either hunter-gatherers or as potters. Even the Twa could advance socially, however, and be adopted into the clans belonging to other ethnic groups. Compared with Rwanda to the north, Burundians enjoyed a greater degree of personal freedom.

Despite the intermixing between Hutus and Tutsis, and the diverse chances for political and social advancement, there existed substantial inequality. The political and social system of the kingdom was likened to feudalism by researcher Nigel Watt who pointed out that many Hutu peasants, especially in certain provinces, faced substantial repression. Rural rebellions were not uncommon. Burundi's royal army was also mainly recruited from Ganwa and Tutsis. On average, high-ranking positions were given to Hutus "by favour", whereas many Tutsis were granted posts "by right".

=== Religion ===
Burundi's traditional religion had one god, called Imana, who was opposed by a devil-like personification of death called Urupfu. The cult surrounding Imana was called ukubandwa and headed by the Kiranga, a kind of high priest. In addition, ancestor worship was widely practised in Burundi. The traditional religion was practised by the country's Hutus and Tutsis. In the 19th century, Islam reached Burundi due to the settlement of Arab and Swahili traders; the Muslims also set up local palm oil production. Islam remained prominent among merchants during the kingdom's existence, but did not spread substantially in Burundi until after the monarchy had been abolished.

In 1879, the first Christian missionaries arrived in Burundi, but they were killed. After the start of the German domination, however, the Catholic Church and its representatives quickly garnered great influence in Burundi. The Catholic White Fathers were quite successful in proselytizing by opening schools and hospitals as well as tolerating widespread syncretism: Instead of directly challenging Burundi's traditional religion, the White Fathers presented Imana as a form of the Christian God. Thus, elements of the old cult carried over into the local form of Christianity. However, the White Fathers largely dismantled the religious elements of the Burundian monarchy. The first Protestant missionaries arrived in 1911; these were German Lutherans, and they fled the country in World War I.

When the Belgians took over Burundi, they began to directly support the White Fathers, further boosting their proselytization efforts. In the 1920s, more Protestants like the Seventh-day Adventists, Anglicans, Danish Baptists, Swedish Pentecostals, American Quakers, and Free Methodists came to Burundi. The Catholic and Protestant missionaries were generally very successful, and Burundi was largely Christian by the end of the Belgian rule.

== Legacy ==
Most members of the royal house live in exile in France today. In the 2005 elections, Princess Esther Kamatari ran for president for the Party for the Restoration of Monarchy and Dialogue in Burundi (Abahuza). Supporters believe that a restoration of a constitutional monarchy could help to ease the country's ethnic tensions.

The royal drums have also survived the kingdom, and are still used up until the present day. Burundi has even become famous for its drummers.

== See also ==
- History of Burundi
- List of kings of Burundi
- Constitution of the Kingdom of Burundi
