= List of kings of Burundi =

Mwami of Burundi
- Coat of arms of the Kingdom of Burundi, with the royal karyenda drum surmounted on the top

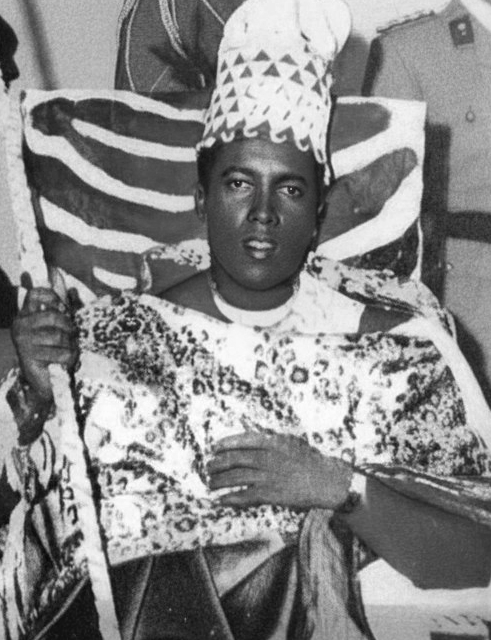
- Last to reign: Ntare V Ndizeye; 8 July 1966 – 28 November 1966

Details
- Style: His Majesty
- First monarch: Ntare I Rushatsi Cambarantama (traditional list); Ntare III Rushatsi (modern list)
- Last monarch: Ntare V Ndizeye
- Formed: c. 1530 (traditional list) c. 1680 (modern list)
- Abolished: 28 November 1966
- Residences: Gitega and Bujumbura, Burundi
- Appointer: Hereditary
- Pretender: Princess Rosa Paula Iribagiza

This article contains two versions of the list of kings of Burundi, the traditional version before 1680 and the modern genealogy. The Kingdom of Burundi was ruled by sovereigns, titled mwami (plural abami), whose regnal names followed a cycle: Ntare (meaning 'lion'), Mwezi (meaning 'moon'), Mutaga (meaning 'day'), and Mwambutsa(meaning 'liberator'). Traditionally, it was thought that there had been four complete cycles but the modern genealogy indicates that there were only two complete cycles, starting with Ntare I Rushatsi.

In the 16th century, Burundi was a kingdom characterized by a hierarchical political authority and tributary economic exchange. A mwami headed a princely aristocracy (ganwa) which owned most of the land governing its subjects with superiority and required a tribute, or tax, from local farmers and herders who lived in forests. The Tutsi monarchy ruled the nation for centuries, but became largely ceremonial with the colonization of the nation by the German Empire in 1899. The kings continued to nominally rule through German and Belgian colonial periods, and the monarchy continued after the nation gained independence from Belgium in 1962. Burundi ceased to be a monarchy when King Ntare V Ndizeye was deposed by Prime Minister and Chief of Staff, Colonel Michel Micombero, who abolished the monarchy and declared a republic following the November 1966 coup d'état.

== Kings of Burundi ==
=== Traditional list ===
The dates before 1900 are estimates.

Portrait	Name	Reign	Ikigabiro
	Ntare I Rushatsi Cambarantama	c. 1530–c. 1550	
	Mwezi I Baridamunka	c. 1550–c. 1580	
	Mutaga I Mutabazi	c. 1580–c. 1600	
	Mwambutsa I Nkomati	c. 1600–c. 1620	
	Ntare II Kibogora	c. 1620–c. 1650	
	Mwezi II Nyaburunga	c. 1650–c. 1680	
	Mutaga II Senyamwiza Mutamo	c. 1680–c. 1700	
	Mwambutsa II Nyarushamba	c. 1700–c. 1720	
	Ntare III Kivimira Semuganzashamba	c. 1720–c. 1750	
	Mwezi III Kavuyimbo (Ndagushimiye)	c. 1750–c. 1780	
	Mutaga III Sebitungwa	c. 1780–c. 1800	
	Mwambutsa III Mbonyuburundi (Mbariza)	c. 1800–c. 1830	
	Ntare IV Runzi (Rutaganzwa Rugamba)	c. 1830–c. 1850	
	Mwezi IV Gisabo Bikata-Bijoga	c. 1850–1908	
	Mutaga IV Mbikije	c. 1908–1915	
	Mwambutsa IV Bangiricenge Rubangishamiheto	1915–1966	
	Ntare V Ndizeye	1966	

=== Modern list ===
Portrait	Name (Lifespan)	Reign	Notes
	Ntare III Rushatsi	c. 1680–c. 1709	
	Mwezi III Ndagushimiye	c. 1709–c. 1739	
	Mutaga III Senyamwiza Mutamo	c. 1739–c. 1767	
	Mwambutsa III Serushambo Butama	c. 1767–c. 1796	Also known as Mwambutsa III Mbariza.
	Ntare IV Rutaganzwa Rugamba (c. 1800–c. 1850)	c. 1796–c. 1850	
	Mwezi IV Gisabo (c. 1840–1908)	c. 1850 – 21 August 1908	
	Mutaga IV Mbikije (c. 1892–1915)	21 August 1908 – 30 November 1915	
	Mwambutsa IV Bangiricenge (1912–1977)	16 December 1915 – 8 July 1966	Left the country following the 1965 coup attempt; deposed in the July 1966 coup d'état.
	Ntare V Ndizeye (1947–1972)	8 July 1966 – 28 November 1966	Deposed in the November 1966 coup d'état.

== Timeline ==
(Based on the traditional list)

(Based on the modern list)

== Royal Standard ==
Royal Standard of Burundi (1962–1966).

== See also ==
- History of Burundi
- Kingdom of Burundi
- Ruanda-Urundi
  - List of colonial residents of Burundi
- President of Burundi
  - List of presidents of Burundi
- Vice-President of Burundi
- Prime Minister of Burundi
