= 1993 Burundian coup attempt =

1993 coup attempt in Burundi

1993 Burundian coup d'état attempt
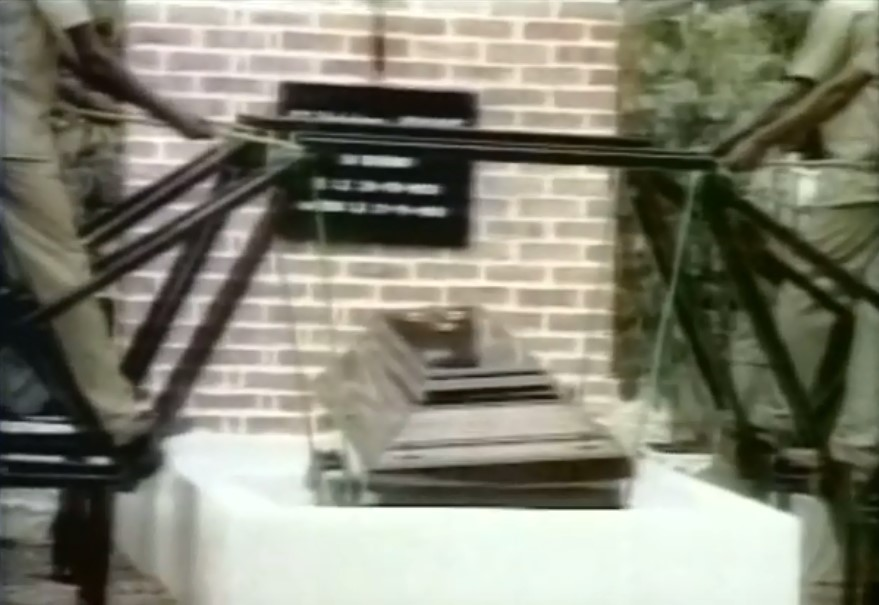
- Burial of President Melchior Ndadaye, who was killed during the coup attempt
- Date: 21 October–November 1993
- Location: Bujumbura, Burundi
- Type: Military coup
- Cause: Ethnic tensions between Hutus and Tutsis; Election of Melchior Ndadaye (Hutu) as President in June 1993
- Motive: Regime change
- Outcome: Coup fails: Assassination of Melchior Ndadaye and other officials; Reinstatement of the civilian-led government; Outbreak of ethnic violence and the Burundian Civil War
- Deaths: Numerous government officials and family members killed among which: President of the National Assembly Pontien Karibwami, Vice President of the National Assembly Gilles Bimazubute, Minister of Home Affairs and Communal Development Juvénal Ndayikeza, Director of Intelligence Richard Ndikumwami

On 21 October 1993, a coup was attempted in Burundi by a Tutsi–dominated army faction. The coup attempt resulted in assassination of Hutu President Melchior Ndadaye and the deaths of other officials in the constitutional line of presidential succession. François Ngeze was presented as the new President of Burundi by the army, but the coup failed under domestic and international pressure, leaving Prime Minister Sylvie Kinigi in charge of the government.

Following a long period of military rule by Tutsi army officers, in the early 1990s Burundi underwent a democratic transition. In June 1993 presidential and parliamentary elections were held and won by the Hutu-dominated Front pour la Démocratie au Burundi (FRODEBU), displacing the ruling Union pour le Progrès National (UPRONA) and President Pierre Buyoya. A new coalition government was installed on 10 July with FRODEBU leader Ndadaye as Burundi's first Hutu president. Ndadaye's tenure was largely peaceful, but during his time in office Burundi was subject to several social and political disruptions. Thousands of Burundian Hutu refugees who had fled previous political violence returned to the country en masse, while the government reconsidered various contracts and economic concessions made by the previous regimes and began reforming the army. These actions threatened the interest of Tutsi business elites and military officers. In this atmosphere, elements in the army began planning a coup. The exact identity of those who led the plot remains unknown, though Ngeze, Army Chief of Staff Jean Bikomagu, ex-President Jean-Baptiste Bagaza, and outgoing President Buyoya are widely suspected to have been involved.

Early in the morning on 21 October 1993 army units took up positions around Bujumbura and mounted an attack on the presidential palace. After several hours Ndadaye was captured and taken to a military camp where he was murdered. The putschists also targeted key FRODEBU leaders, killing President of the National Assembly Pontien Karibwami, Vice President of the National Assembly Gilles Bimazubute, Minister of Home Affairs and Communal Development Juvénal Ndayikeza, and Director of Intelligence Richard Ndikumwami. The deaths of Karibwami and Bimazubute eliminated the constitutional line of presidential succession. Other government figures, including Kinigi, survived by fleeing or seeking shelter at the French embassy. Later that day the army formed a crisis committee and presented Ngeze as the new President of Burundi. The announcement of Ndadaye's death touched off severe ethnic violence, as angered Hutu peasants and FRODEBU members began murdering Tutsis. The army retaliated by massacring Hutus. The international community and civil society organisations condemned the coup and requested a return to constitutional governance. Faced with these challenges, in the afternoon of 23 October Bikomagu ordered the army to return to its barracks, and two days later Kinigi's government announced the abrogation of all emergency measures declared by the putschists.

The coup attempt left Prime Minister Kinigi—the highest-ranking civilian official to survive—the de facto head of state of Burundi. Civilian institutions of government were reestablished in earnest in December. Attempts by the National Assembly to elect a successor to Ndadaye were stifled by the Tutsi-dominated Constitutional Court, though the body eventually succeed in selecting Cyprien Ntaryamira as President of Burundi in January 1994. Ntaryamira died in April and was succeeded by Sylvestre Ntibantunganya, while ethnic violence persisted and UPRONA pushed demands for more favorable constitutional arrangements. Frustrated by this turn of events, some FRODEBU elements broke away from the party and formed rebel groups, leading to the Burundian Civil War.

== Background ==
From the mid-1960s, the country of Burundi was politically dominated by its Tutsi ethnic minority at the expense of the Hutu majority. Union pour le Progrès National (UPRONA), which served as the legal ruling party from 1966, was overwhelmingly made up of Tutsis. Military officers dominated the presidency, coming to power through coups. During this time there instances of ethnic repression, particularly in 1972 when the Burundian Army quashed a Hutu rebellion and then murdered thousands of civilians.

In 1987 Pierre Buyoya became President of Burundi following a coup. He initially ignored the country's ethnic strife and perpetuated Tutsi domination of public life. In August 1988 violence broke out and the army massacred thousands of Hutus. Facing substantial foreign pressure, Buyoya initiated reforms designed to end Burundi's systemic ethnic violence, while UPRONA attempted to incorporate more Hutus into its ranks. The Tutsi establishment in the army and security forces nevertheless resisted change. A commission appointed by the president produced a constitution which provided for democratic elections. The document was adopted via referendum in March 1992 followed shortly thereafter by the creation of new political parties. Buyoya scheduled free elections in 1993 and offered himself as UPRONA's presidential candidate. UPRONA's main challenger became Front pour la Démocratie au Burundi (FRODEBU), a party largely associated with Hutus. In the 1 June presidential election Buyoya faced Melchior Ndadaye, who was backed by FRODEBU. Ndadaye won the election in a landslide, earning 64 percent of the popular vote. In the subsequent parliamentary elections on 29 June, FRODEBU won 71.4 percent of the vote and earned 80 percent of the seats in the National Assembly. The party also took over most local administration, displacing many Tutsi incumbents.

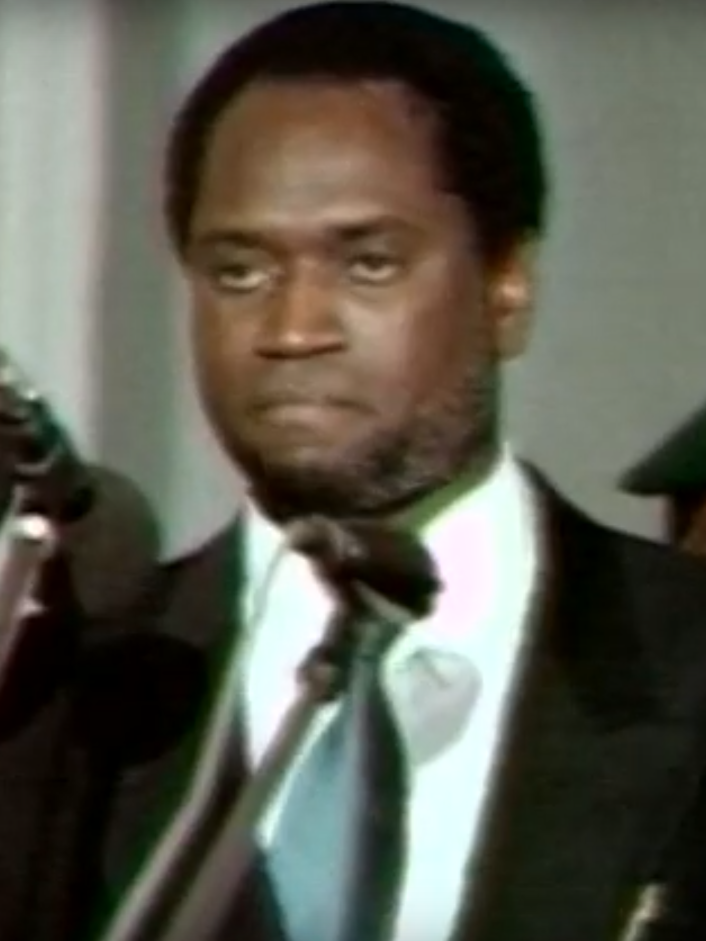
President Melchior Ndadaye, pictured in 1993

Rumors circulated in Burundi that the army would attempt to intervene to disrupt the transition. Ndadaye reassured a supporter that "They can kill Ndadaye, but they can't kill all 5 million Ndadayes." A plot from a handful of officers discovered on 3 July to seize Ndadaye's residence failed due to a lack of support from other components of the military, resulting in several arrests, including that of its suspected leader, Lieutenant Colonel Slyvestre Ningaba, who had been chef de cabinet for Buyoya. Buyoya—who had urged the populace to accept the results of the election—condemned the coup attempt, as did the army leadership. (Note: American diplomat Bob Krueger wrote that Commandant Hilaire Ntakiyica told him that the coup had been planned by Buyoya. It reportedly failed after the French ambassador and apostolic nuncio, having learned of the plot, warned Buyoya that the international community would not accept a coup, and thus the president intervened and ordered the army not to act.) Ndadaye was sworn-in as President on 10 July. He assembled a government of 23 ministers, including 13 FRODEBU and six UPRONA members. Nine of the ministers were Tutsi, including Prime Minister Sylvie Kinigi, a member of UPRONA.

Ndadaye's tenure was largely peaceful, but during his time in office Burundi was subject to several social and political disruptions. Among the former, the media—recently liberalised—often used its freedom to discuss public issues in an inflammatory manner. Thousands of Burundian Hutu refugees who had fled during the violence of 1972 began returning en masse and demanding the reclamation of their property. Though Ndadaye suggested resettling them in vacant lands, many local officials made room for them by evicting others from their homes. Politically, Ndadaye's government reexamined several contracts and economic concessions made the by the previous regime, posing a threat to Tutsi elite business interests. Military reforms also led to the separation of the gendarmerie's command from the army, the replacement of the chiefs of staff of the army and gendarmerie, and new requirements for enrollment into the army were introduced. The army was due to open its annual recruitment drive in November, and there were fears among some Tutsi soldiers that this process would be altered in a way that would threaten their dominance of the institution.

== Coup organisers ==
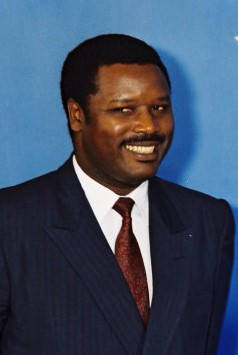
Some observers suspected that former president Pierre Buyoya was involved in the coup.

At some point a group of army personnel began planning a coup against Ndadaye's government. According to an officer in the Presidential Guard, one of the preparations taken by the plotters was to move troops from further postings into Bujumbura to grow the strength of the army. According to journalist Alexis Sinduhige, the putschists relied on a corporal, Nzisabira, as an informant in the Presidential Guard.

The exact identity of those who planned and organised the 1993 coup remains disputed. Army Chief of the General Staff Lieutenant Colonel Jean Bikomagu, ex-President Jean-Baptiste Bagaza, and former Minister of Interior François Ngeze are generally regarded as leading members. Bikomagu and Bagaza denied any involvement, while Ngeze said he had been forced to support the putsch. Others believed to have played a key planning role include Lieutenant Colonel Ningaba, Lieutenant Colonel Charles Kazatasa, Lieutenant Colonel Laurent Niyonkuru, and Major Bernard Busokoza. Some human rights groups also suspected ex-President Buyoya of supporting the putschists. American diplomat Bob Krueger considered Buyoya to be the person chiefly responsible for the coup, as did Lieutenant Jean-Paul Kamana and Commandant Hilaire Ntakiyica, two soldiers who admitted to partaking in minor roles in the plot. Others suspected of involvement include Jérôme Sinduhije, Alphonse-Marie Kadege, Libère Bararunyestse, Pascal Simbanduku, Lieutenant Colonel Jean-Bosco Daradangwe, François Bizindavyi, Samuel Nduwingoma, Laurent Niyonkuru, UPRONA politician Charles Mukasi, Lieutenant Colonel Nzosaba, Lieutenant Colonel Ndayisaba, Lieutenant Colonel Niyoyunguruza, Lieutenant Colonel Maregarege, Lieutenant Colonel Nengeri, Lieutenant Colonel Pancrace Girukwigomba, Major Gervais Nimubona, Major Bukasa, Major Haziyo, Lieutenant Ntarataza, Lieutenant Ngomirakiza, Vincent Niyungeko, and George Mukarako. The role of foreign influences is unknown.

== Prelude ==
From 16 to 18 October 1993, Ndadaye attended a summit of francophone heads of state in Mauritius. He returned to Burundi on the last day. During that time, Chief of the General Staff of the Gendarmerie Lieutenant Colonel Epitace Bayaganakandi informed Minister of Defence Lieutenant Colonel Charles Ntakije that he was in the possession of reliable reports which indicated a coup was being planned. On 19 October, an army officer approached the wife of Minister of Communications Jean-Marie Ngendahayo and informed her that personnel in the army headquarters were plotting against the president. At 15:00 on 20 October, Major Isaïe Nibizi—commander of the 2nd Commando Battalion, commandant of Camp Muha, and the officer responsible for presidential security—informed Ndadaye's chef de cabinet about suspicious military movements.

Later that afternoon, Ndadaye hosted a cabinet meeting in Bujumbura to mark the first 100 days of his presidency (which had passed two days prior) and discuss what his government had accomplished in comparison to its campaign promises. After the meeting, Ngendahayo requested to speak in private with Ndadaye. In the president's office, Ngendahayo raised concerns about Ndadaye's safety. Instead of informing the president about the vague threat his wife had learned of, he told him that he felt it strange that UPRONA, the Tutsi-dominated opposition party, was denouncing the government's popular policy of allowing thousands of Burundian refugees to return to the country before the commune elections in December. Ngendahayo stated that he thought this would cost UPRONA the elections, and thus the only reason they would oppose the policy is if they planned to take power via assassination and a coup. He also requested that Ndadaye further consider a previous report declaring his security to be inadequate. Ndadaye instructed Ngendahayo to bring him Minister of Defence Ntakije. Ngendahayo found Ntakije in a separate room on a telephone call. Ambassador Melchior Ntamobwa, who was also present, told Ngendahayo that the colonel was being informed of a coup plot meant to move forward that night. Once Ntakije finished the call, he and Ngendahayo went to the president's office.

Ntakije told Ndadaye that a coup was being planned by the 11th Armoured Car Battalion, which was going to attack the Presidential Palace at 02:00 on 21 October. When asked how he would respond, Ntakije said he would gather trusted officers and organise an ambush if the battalion left its camp. Ndadaye inquired about the status of Sylvestre Ningaba, the officer who had been arrested in July for attempting a coup, and asked if he could be relocated to a different prison so the putschists could not obtain his help. Ntakije said that this would not be possible due to the objections of prison officials to transferring detainees at nighttime, but he assured the president that he would station an additional armoured car at the Presidential Palace for extra security. Ndadaye spoke about training possibilities for the Presidential Guard before releasing both ministers and going to the palace. When he arrived he told his wife, Laurence, about the coup plot, but was mostly assured by what Ntakije had said to him. (Note: Writing on Ndadaye's willingness to return to the palace despite the threat, journalists Gaëtan Sebudandi and Pierre-Olivier Richard asserted that the president was probably convinced that the coup would be easily foiled, just like the plot on 3 July. Krueger wrote, "That a president as intelligent as Ndadaye's associates found him to be would so readily accept such scant preparations for his protection seems, in retrospect, remarkable to an outsider...However, in a capital perpetually nervous with rumour, it becomes exhausting to take seriously every reported threat. Moreover, Ndadaye may have had a kind of che sarà, sarà, fatalistic attitude that could come to a person who, having overcome numerous life threatening challenges, was unwilling to run away from the position and responsibilities he had so recently assumed.") Ndadaye and his wife went to sleep, but he was awoken by a phone call from Brussels by J. Alfred Ndoricimpa, the Methodist Bishop of Burundi, who informed the president of rumours circulating among the Burundian expatriates in Brussels of an impending military coup.

== The coup ==
=== Attack on the Presidential Palace ===
At around midnight on 20/21 October, putschists of the 11th Armoured Car Battalion departed from Camp Muha in over a dozen armoured cars and took up positions around Bujumbura. Within an hour they surrounded the Presidential Palace. They were joined by hundreds of soldiers and gendarmes from the other eleven military camps in Bujumbura, including members of the 1st Parachute Battalion and a few personnel from the 2nd Commando Battalion. They prepared to attack the palace, which was only guarded by 38 soldiers of the Presidential Guard and two armoured cars. Shortly before 01:00 on 21 October, Ntakije called the president and told him that armoured cars had left Camp Muha for an unknown destination and advised him to leave the palace immediately. Ndadaye then attempted to reach Captain Ildephonse Mushwabure, the commander of the palace guard, by phone, but when he did not answer he went into the palace gardens. At 01:30 the putschists fired a single shot, and shortly thereafter at least one armoured car blasted a hole in the wall of the grounds and began bombarding the palace with cannon fire. Laurence Ndadaye took her three children into an interior room and sheltered them under tables, though she and her son were grazed by shrapnel. Meanwhile, the president was disguised in a military uniform by his guards and placed in one of their armoured cars in the garden, where he remained for the next six hours. According to political scientist René Lemarchand, the palace guards offered sustained resistance to the attack until several of them defected to the increasing number of putschists and the rest gave up. Two of the putschists were reportedly wounded by gunfire when they attempted to enter the palace grounds. In contrast, Laurence Ndadaye stated that none of the guards resisted the attack. The United Nations International Commission of Inquiry for Burundi wrote, "An armed confrontation is reported to have taken place between 'attackers' and 'defenders' for six hours...yet no one was killed, no armored car damaged."

Laurence Ndadaye was unable to reach her husband's cell phone and believed he was dead. When Ntakije called for him, she told him that he was in the garden. Laurence then made a series of phone calls to Minister of Foreign Affairs Sylvestre Ntibantunganya, Minister of Agriculture Cyprien Ntaryamira, FRODEBU leaders, the provincial governors, and President Juvénal Habyarimana of Rwanda to inform them of the coup. Habyarimana told her he was already aware of the putsch. After being warned, Ntibantunganya began calling FRODEBU leaders in an attempt to rally the government. At 02:10 he reached Ngendahayo. Ngendahayo then telephoned Ntakije, who reported that the situation was under control. When Ntakije called back 30 minutes later, the colonel said that he was hiding and urged Ngendahayo to flee. Ngendahayo then took his family in his private car to the home of Michel Ramboux, a Belgian development official and personal friend.

=== Escape attempts of the government ministers ===
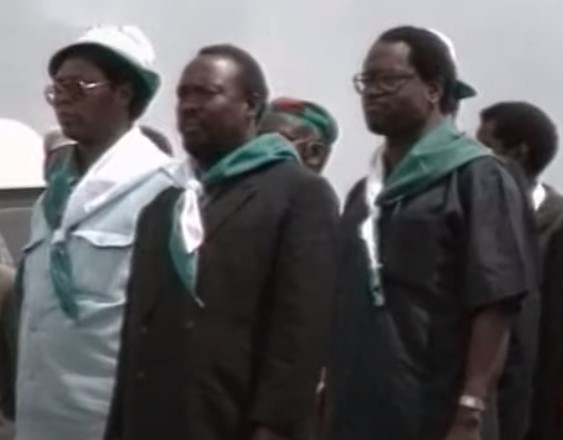
Cyprien Ntaryamira (center) was among the leading FRODEBU members who survived the coup.

Meanwhile, the chargé d'affaires of the United States embassy, Paul Patin, awoke to the sound of gunfire. He called his embassy's head of security and asked him for a ride to the legation. When the security officer and a United States marine arrived at his residence some Burundian soldiers attempted to impede their entry, but they soon departed and Patin reached the embassy, where he telephoned the United States Department of State and told them about the coup. At 2:45 Ntibantunganya telephoned Patin, telling him that the president was safe and that "the situation seems to be under control". He also extracted Patin's assurances that the United States government would condemn the coup. At about 03:30 he told Patin that he was preparing to flee. Distrustful of his military guard, he changed into his gardener's clothes and walked to a friend's home, where he remained in hiding for the next two days. Ntaryamira hid in his neighbours' home, who were Tutsis. When soldiers did not find him in his own residence, they went there asking for his whereabouts. The matriarch of the household told the soldiers that Ntaryamira had fled down the road, and they quickly departed.

Meanwhile, the wives of Ntibantunganya and Ntaryamira, agreeing that they should split up from their husbands, sought safety in the home of their friend, Dominique Barumpozako. Soldiers went there in search of them and killed Ntibantunganya's wife and her houseguest, whom they mistook for Ntaryamira's wife. Minister of Home Affairs and Communal Development Juvénal Ndayikeza called the provincial governors before telephoning Patin to ask him for refuge in the United States embassy. Patin assured him safety, but before Ndayikeza could reach the embassy he was captured by soldiers and killed. Vice-President of the National Assembly Gilles Bimazubute was collected by soldiers from his residence. Though a Tutsi, he was a proponent of majority rule and was thus regarded as a traitor by the putschists, who soon thereafter killed him. When soldiers arrived at Director of Intelligence Richard Ndikumwami's house, he drew a pistol to defend himself. They quickly disarmed him and bayoneted him in front of his family before taking his body away. President of the National Assembly Pontien Karibwami—who was ex officio Vice President of Burundi—lived in the former home of President Buyoya, which was constructed with many security features. The guards at his home did not resist the putschists, but they were unable to break in for an hour until they breached the reinforced doors with a bazooka. They fatally beat and bayoneted Karibwami and took him away.

Kinigi's bodyguards remained loyal to her during the takeover. Deputy Prime Ministers Bernard Ciza and Melchior Ntahobama were betrayed by their guards and were imprisoned. However, a few hours later a junior military officer freed them and asked them where they wished to go. Ciza was taken to the French embassy, while Ntahobama was taken to the home of the deputy chief of mission of the Belgian embassy. FRODEBU parliamentary leader Jean-Bosco Sindayigaya was also arrested but later released. At about 04:00, a technician awakened by the putschists was, after some delay, able to sever telecommunications between Bujumbura and elsewhere. With the phone lines inoperative, Patin decided to search for President Ndadaye. Upon reaching the Burundian Army headquarters, French military attachés who were present dissuaded him from going to Camp Muha, saying it was too dangerous.

Shortly before dawn, Ngendahayo scaled the wall at Ramboux's residence and went to the neighbouring home, which belonged to his brother and was also where Minister of Refugee Repatriation Léonard Nyangoma was staying. At about 07:00 Ngendahayo telephoned Colonel Bikomagu. The colonel stated that the situation was "under control" and that Ndadye was "in a safe place". Ngendahayo requested a military escort so that he could go to the radio and television station and, as Minister of Communications, inform the country of such. Bikomagu said he would call back and send an escort when possible.

=== Death of Ndadaye ===
At about 7:00, soldiers breached the Presidential Palace and found Laurence Ndadaye and her children. They told them to go outside to find shelter in an armoured car. After 30 minutes of avoiding gunfire, they reached one of the two cars, which would not start. They quickly reunited with President Ndadaye, who was in the other armoured vehicle. The family considered scaling the perimeter wall to go to the neighbouring Meridian Hotel, but found that the palace was surrounded by putschists. At Captain Mushwabure's direction, Ndadaye decided to be taken with his family to Camp Muha. At 7:30 they left in their armoured car, and were trailed by the putschists' vehicles. Upon arriving at the base at 8:00, their car was surrounded by putschists of the 1st Battalion. Ndadaye was taken by Colonel Bikomagu to a meeting with other senior officers of the army. About an hour later he returned with Secretary of State for Security Colonel Lazare Gakoryo, having reached a verbal agreement with the officers. Ndadaye reentered the armoured car with Gakoryo to finalise their understanding on paper, but when the secretary of state exited the vehicle soldiers began shouting for the president to come out. Once he did, Bikomagu quieted the crowd and Ndadaye appealed to the soldiers to negotiate peacefully with him.

Soldiers began closing in on the president, and Bikomagu instructed them to let his family go since they were "of no interest" to them. He directed a driver to take the family away, and at Laurence's direction, the soldier brought them to the French embassy, where they were allowed to take refuge. Bikomagu then pointed at President Ndadaye and said to the putschists, "He is the one you were looking for. Here he is. Do what you want with him." They placed Ndadaye in a jeep and drove him to the 1st Parachute Battalion's camp nearby, closely followed by Bikomagu, Gakoryo, and Major Nibizi. The president was taken to an office where ten junior officers—specifically assigned to the task—killed him. A coroner's report later found that Ndadaye was held by a cord around his neck while the soldiers bayoneted him 14 times. Half of the wounds penetrated his thorax and the subsequent bleeding filled up his lungs, killing him. According to historian Gérard Prunier, Lieutenant Colonel Paul Kamana "is thought to be the person who actually killed President Ndadaye". The soldiers then dug a mass grave in the centre of the camp, where they buried Ndadaye, Karibwami, Bimazubute, Ndayikeza, and Ndikumwami. After several hours the soldiers realised that international opinion would strongly disapprove of such treatment of the bodies, so they exhumed them and allowed family members to collect them. Of the politicians killed during the coup attempt, all were FRODEBU members, and all but one were Hutu.

Meanwhile, at about 7:30 Ngendahayo called Bikomagu. Bikomagu stated that he was with Ndadaye, but that the president could not speak due to the presence of hostile soldiers outside and quickly hung up. Ngendahayo, his brother, and Nyangoma suspected that Bikomagu was lying and, feeling that he might have sent troops to kill them, they fled to the warehouse of Belgian businessman Michel Carlier. Carlier hid them in the warehouse, and Ngendahayo managed to reach Ndadaye's chef de cabinet via cell phone. He told them that the president was dead and that Ngendahayo, as Minister of Communications, had to inform the public. Afterwards, two technicians from the radio station phoned him, saying that while they could not broadcast a speech through their own station, they had a working telephone connection with Radio Rwanda. Ngendahayo proceeded to deliver the following message for Radio Rwanda:

I do not know for certain the fate of President Ndadaye at this time. What I do know is that, whether alive or dead, no one will stop the democratic process in Burundi. The people have decided to choose freedom. The wheel of history is going forward. I therefore call upon the free world's representatives to rescue the nation of Burundi and its democracy. And I particularly call upon the francophone countries to assist, because at the recent francophone summit attended by President Ndadaye, they highlighted the virtues of democracy. I hope that they will spearhead this process in Burundi. And I call upon all Burundians to fight for democracy wherever they are.

The message was repeatedly broadcast over Radio Rwanda throughout the day in French and Kirundi. Ngendahayo, his brother, and Nyangoma then took one of Carlier's company cars and reached the French embassy. Kinigi and Ntakije also sought refuge there; most of the cabinet was gathered at the embassy. (Note: Academic Nigel Watt wrote that "it was reported" that the Belgian embassy had declined to offer the ministers sanctuary.) Minister of Justice Fulgence Bakana fled to Rwanda. Most members of the National Assembly successfully went into hiding. Radio Rwanda broke news of Ndadaye's death early in the evening. Minister of Health Jean Minani was in Kigali at the time of the takeover, and delivered a message through the station, appealing to Burundians to resist the coup and calling for international armed intervention to protect the civilian government.

=== Military government ===
Early in the morning on 21 October François Ngeze, a Hutu UPRONA member of the National Assembly and former Minister of Interior under Buyoya, was brought to Camp Para in Bujumbura. Later that morning army officers assembled in the camp's mess and Ngeze was presented to them as the new President of Burundi. At about 14:00 on 21 October, a "Comité de gestion de crise" assembled at the Burundian Army headquarters. It comprised Ngeze (who was presiding), Army Chief of the General Staff Lieutenant Colonel Jean Bikomagu, Lieutenant Colonel Pascal Simbanduku, and Lieutenant Colonel Jean-Bosco Daradangwe. They were later joined by Lieutenant Colonel Slyvestre Ningaba following his release from prison. (Note: All of the soldiers arrested in July for plotting a coup were released during the October putsch.) The committee resolved that military commanders in the provinces should arrest the governors and replace them, reattached the gendarmerie's command to the army, and sent out an appeal for politicians and foreign diplomats to meet with them and "discuss ways to manage the crisis".

In the afternoon Ngeze conducted a courtesy call at the French embassy to introduce himself as the new head of state. French Ambassador Henri Crepin-Leblond told him that the coup was unconstitutional and that power should be turned over to the civilian government. Ngeze then went to the local office of the United Nations Development Program, where the head of the mission, Jocelyn Basil-Finley, told him that the international community would not accept the coup. Ngeze then made several presidential appointments, assigning a new director of intelligence. At about 21:00, he introduced himself to the public in a television broadcast as President of the Conseil National de Salut Public—a body which did not exist—and announced the displacement of the governors among other actions as measures meant to "manage the crisis". Public radio announcements appealing for public support of the new regime were drafted under the direction of UPRONA politician Charles Mukasi. The country's borders were closed and Bujumbura International Airport was shut down.

The Rwanda-based Radio Télévision Libre des Mille Collines (RTLM) reported that a coup had taken place and that Ndadaye had been captured on 21 October. This led young FRODEBU members to arm themselves and take Tutsis and Hutu UPRONA members hostage. Once RTLM announced later that day that Ndadaye was dead, the hostages were executed. The United Nations International Commission of Inquiry for Burundi determined in 1996 that "circumstantial evidence is sufficient to warrant the conclusion" that some FRODEBU leaders had anticipated the possibility of an army coup attempt and disseminated plans for armed resistance and hostage-taking. The announcement of Ndadaye's death triggered an immediate reaction of violence from FRODEBU members and Hutu peasants across the country, who took to murdering all Tutsis they encountered. Some of the perpetrators stated that they acted out of fear that the assassination signaled an imminent repeat of the 1972 killings of Hutus. More deaths occurred when the army intervened to restore "peace and order", resorting to brutality and murdering many Hutu civilians in the process. Thousands more people fled abroad. When protestors peacefully demonstrated against the coup in Bujumbura, soldiers opened fire on them, killing about 10 people.

=== Collapse of the coup ===
On 22 October Ngeze met with the Bujumbura diplomatic corps and representatives of international organisations at Kigobe Palace. He explained that since the country was embroiled by crisis, he had taken power with the support of the army to restore order. His remarks were negatively received. That afternoon, protestors marched through the capital to commemorate Ndadaye and condemn the coup. All major providers of foreign aid to Burundi suspended their relief programs, particularly Belgium, France, Germany, the United States, and the European Union. The governments of Tanzania, Rwanda, and Zaire condemned the coup, as did the Commonwealth Heads of Government Meeting in session in Cyprus, the Organisation of African Unity (OAU), United Nations Secretary-General Boutros Boutros-Ghali, the United Nations Security Council, and the United Nations General Assembly. Boutros-Ghali dispatched Special Envoy James O. C. Jonah to "facilitate the return of the country to constitutional rule". Burundian religious leaders also requested that Bikomagu and Ngeze restore the constitution, while Minani declared that he was forming a government-in-exile in Kigali. The following day several political parties, churches, and civic associations released a joint statement calling for a return to constitutional governance.

Faced with these challenges, in the afternoon of 23 October Bikomagu—offering himself as a mediator between the putschists and the government—ordered the army to return to its barracks and asked for an amnesty for those involved in the coup attempt. Daradangwe urged the civilian government to assume command over the army. The government rejected amnesty for the putschists. The following day Kinigi told reporters at the French embassy that her government had "no power" and appealed for "countries with good relations with us to send us troops". In a broadcast via Radio Rwanda, Ngendahayo asked the population to remain calm and asserted that the once the government could assume its responsibilities it would apprehend those responsible for the coup. The army in turn rejected Kinigi's call of international armed intervention. On 25 October the civilian government declared the abrogation of all emergency measures and the following day it reestablished control over Burundi National Radio and Television, the state broadcaster. Two days later the UPRONA parliamentary group declared its support for the civilian regime.

On 2 November an OAU peace mission was dispatched to Burundi, and Kinigi and Bikomagu met to try and sort out their differences. On 7 November Kinigi left the French embassy and returned to her residence under the protection of French soldiers. The French government assigned approximately 15 antiterror police officers and 20 military advisors to assist Kinigi's government and train a Burundian force to assume responsibility for its security. The UN Security Council ultimately declined to send a peacekeeping force to Burundi.

== Aftermath ==
=== Academic analysis ===
Historian Alison Des Forges wrote that while the putschists never issued a manifesto, "it is clear they aimed to destroy the democratic government". She also wrote that "it may have been more of a self-interested coup by soldiers who happened to be Tutsi than a coup to safeguard the interests of the Tutsi as a group". Political scientist Filip Reyntjens described the coup as "the most successful failed military take-over" in African history, and largely attributed its failure to popular domestic resistance. Journalists Zdenek Červenka and Colin Legum stated that "In military terms, the coup was a success. The predominantly Tutsi army still [held] effective power. However, in political terms, the actions by the military extremists was an abysmal failure since it failed in their major objective of displacing the democratically elected government." According to Lemarchand, the coup was a "watershed event" which "destroyed a nascent interethnic consensus" and "undid in a few hours what a democratic transition begun five years earlier had so painstakingly tried to accomplish". Reyntjens concurred and wrote that it led to the reemergence of ethnicity as "the single most important factor of political life". Academic Alexandre Hatungimana wrote that the killing of Ndadaye "opened a constitutional void that neither the army, divided on the military coup, nor the political parties of the opposition, weakened by their defeat in the election, nor civil society, paralyzed by the violence that took hold of nearly all the hilltops in the country, were able to fill". Economist Léonce Ndikumana argued that, "Unlike earlier ethnic conflicts [...] the crisis that followed the October 1993 military coup has been longer, bloodier, and has affected the entire country."

=== Ethnic violence ===
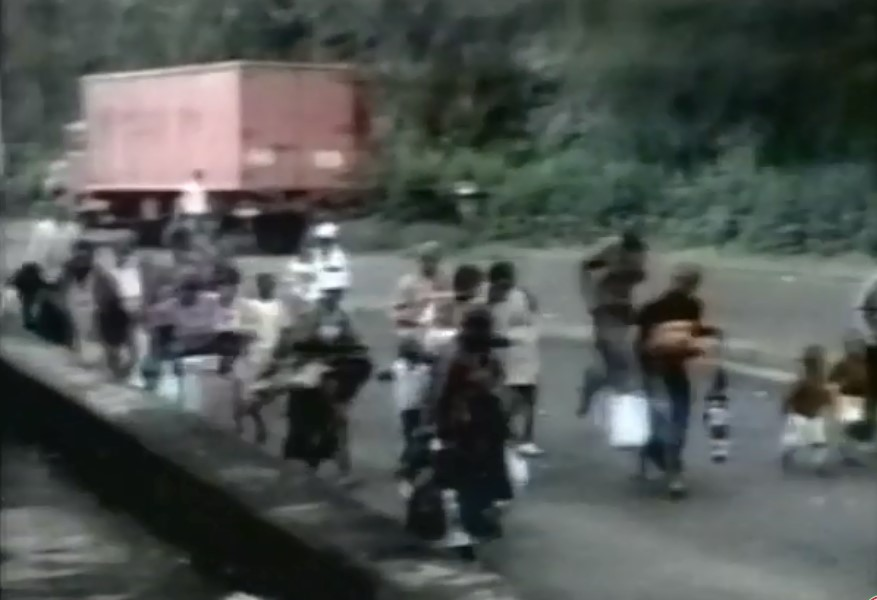
Burundians fleeing from the violence in the aftermath of the coup attempt

The ethnic violence following the coup lasted to the end of the year. Initial estimates of the death toll ranged from 25,000 to 500,000. A joint study conducted by the United Nations Population Fund and the Burundian government in 2002 estimated the number of people killed from 21 October to 31 December 1993 to be 116,059, with at least 100,000 deaths occurring in late October. It remains unclear what proportion of these victims were Tutsi and what proportion were Hutu. The question of whether the killings of Tutsis during this time arose from a planned genocide or from spontaneous violence remains heavily disputed among academics and Burundians who lived through the events. The killing of Ndadaye and the flight of 300,000 Hutu refugees to Rwanda during the violence crystallised anti-Tutsi sentiment among Hutus there and greatly troubled the prospects of the Arusha Accords power-sharing agreement designed to end the Rwandan Civil War. Reyntjens asserted that Ndadaye's assassination completely derailed the peace process in Rwanda. Some Rwandan Hutus even speculated that the Tutsi-dominated Rwandan Patriotic Front had assisted in the coup. (Note: Prunier described the Rwandan Patriotic Front's attitude towards the coup as "ambivalent"; the organisation issued a communique officially condemning Ndadaye's murder and the subsequent ethnic violence, but some of its members openly celebrated the president's death. The RPF also helped several Burundian army officers purportedly involved in the coup settle in Kampala after fleeing Burundi.) RTLM, a Rwandan Hutu extremist propaganda station, deliberately misreported the details of Ndadaye's death—saying he had been tortured and castrated—to inflame anti-Tutsi sentiment. According to Prunier, the death of Ndadaye greatly strengthened the messaging of Rwandan Hutu extremists who sought to exterminate Tutsis and allowed them to push their ideas beyond fringe status, culminating in the Rwandan genocide of 1994. In the city of Uvira in eastern Zaire, Tutsi-related Banyamulenge people were stoned in reaction to the coup.

=== Political effects ===
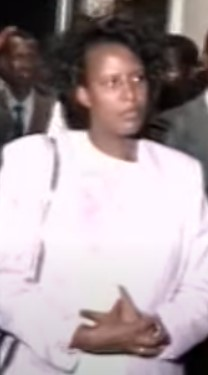
Prime Minister Sylvie Kinigi was left the de facto President of Burundi following the coup.

The deaths of Ndadaye, Karibwami, and Bimazubute eliminated the constitutionally-delineated presidential line of succession, and left Kinigi, the highest-ranking civilian official to survive the putsch, the de facto head of state of Burundi. On 8 November the Constitutional Court ruled that "the government acting collegially" assumed the responsibilities of the interim presidency until a new president could be elected. The constitution stipulated that upon the death of a president elections were to be held in three months time, but this was unanimously deemed practically and financially unworkable. According to Reyntjens, the failure of the October putsch led its perpetrators to opt for a "creeping coup", eroding FRODEBU's legitimacy and establishing a constitutional order that favored their aims. Civilian institutions of government were reestablished in earnest in December 1993; the government moved to a mansion near Lake Tanganyika under the protection of the French military. The National Assembly reconvened and elected Sylvestre Ntibantunganya as its new presiding officer and Christian Sendegaya as vice-president. Attempts by the National Assembly to elect a successor to Ndadaye were stifled by the Tutsi-dominated Constitutional Court, though the body eventually succeed in electing Cyprien Ntaryamira as president on 13 January 1994 and inaugurating him on 5 February. The composition of the government was revised and Kinigi was replaced by another Tutsi UPRONA member, Anatole Kanyenkiko. Ntaryamira was killed alongside President Habyarimana of Rwanda when their plane was shot down over Kigali on April 6. Ntibantunganya subsequently became president.

Tutsi extremists continued to employ violence in the months after the coup to put pressure on FRODEBU. By mid-1994, the Tutsi-dominated army was conducting ethnic cleansing operations and UPRONA was pushing for constitutional revisions. Seeing no other options, FRODEBU leaders agreed to make concessions to their political opponents. This resulted in the signing of a protocole d'accord on 12 July, a power-sharing agreement which allotted 60 percent of all government and administration offices to FRODEBU and the rest to UPRONA. Unsatisfied, UPRONA and its allies increased their demands, leading to the signing of the Convention de Gouvernement in September. The agreement raised UPRONA's share of government positions to 45 percent, and mostly stripped the government and National Assembly of their powers by investing all executive authority in a National Security Council. The council comprised the president, prime minister, and eight other persons named by the president "on the proposition of political parties and after consulting with the representatives of civil society". A UPRONA/Tutsi faction then seized a majority on the council and effectively regained control of the country. Reyntjens described the convention as "the institutional translation of the October 1993 coup: the constitution [had] been shelved and the outcome of both the presidential and parliamentary elections swept aside as the president and parliament [were] placed under the tutelage of an unconstitutional body".

Over the course of the 1994 negotiations, several FRODEBU leaders broke away from the talks and formed rebel groups, including the Conseil National Pour la Défense de la Démocratie-Forces pour la Défense de la Démocratie (CNDD-FDD), sparking the decade-long Burundian Civil War. Civil governance broke down as UPRONA and FRODEBU grew unable to cooperate, and on 25 July 1996 the army staged another coup which returned Buyoya to the presidency. Under regional pressure, the warring factions began negotiations in 1998. The Arusha Accords were signed in August 2000, but the agreement faced a troubled implementation process. Buyoya stepped down in 2003 and was replaced by Domitien Ndayizeye, while the CNDD-FDD ended its rebellion and engaged in the peace process. South African peacekeepers maintained order while a new consociational constitution was developed. While tensions remained high, political leaders engaged in more constructive and less inflammatory talks than in the aftermath of the 1993 coup, and the army withdrew itself from politics. Municipal elections were held in 2005. UPRONA and FRODEBU were left largely discredited for their governance failures, and CNDD-FDD won a majority of local offices. Subsequent parliamentary elections also resulted in a CNDD-FDD victory. The newly constituted Parliament then elected Pierre Nkurunziza President of Burundi. Ndadaye Day is observed annually in Burundi on 21 October to commemorate the president's death. In 2018, the widow of Karibwami and Ntibantunganya called for official recognition of the others killed in the coup attempt.

== Criminal investigations and fate of alleged putschists ==
Following the failure of the coup, Ningaba, Kamana, Major Bernard Busokoza, and seven other Burundian soldiers fled to Kampala, Uganda. Kamana—who maintained that his only role in the coup was to serve as Ngeze's driver and bodyguard—said he fled upon realising that he would be made a scapegoat by his superiors. Being a source of some embarrassment to Ugandan President Yoweri Museveni, the soldiers were asked to leave in February 1994. They briefly stayed in Zaire before quietly returning to Uganda and eventually being detained in late November.

"Oh my God, the eternal question...Almost three decades that justice has cleared me. But, in the eyes of Burundians, I still remain the "bad boy"...From far or near, I was never involved. As proof, you will find that it was I who first condemned the coup d'etat, asking for respect for legality."

— Ngeze on being asked about his involvement in the coup, 2021

In December 1993 the Burundian government announced the formation of a commission of inquiry to investigate crimes related to the coup attempt and subsequent massacres. The commission never materialised. Similar investigations were conducted by the military and civilian procuracies. The army arrested 18 soldiers suspected of involvement in Ndadaye's murder, but by the end of 1994 none of the accused had been tried. The civilian procuracy began its investigations in April 1994. They were conducted by teams of provincial magistrates but were undermined by the Tutsi-dominated judicial system. The prosecutors arrested several hundred people—almost all of them Hutus—but by the end of 1994 had not subjected any of them to trial. As required by the Convention de Govournement, in October 1994 President Ntibantunganya called for an international commission of inquiry to investigate the events of October 1993, but no immediate steps were taken to further this endeavor.

In March 1994 Boutros-Ghali sent a UN fact-finding mission to Burundi to investigate the coup attempt and subsequent massacres, but its findings were not made public. Further teams were sent by the UN Security Council and Boutros-Ghali throughout 1994 and early 1995 to investigate the massacres, all concluding that the perpetrators of Ndadaye's murder should be held accountable. An International Commission of Inquiry for Burundi was eventually established in August 1995 by the UN Security Council. The body's investigation was obstructed by the Burundian military and it found inconsistencies in the testimonies of Tutsi officers. When interviewed about the events, senior commanders portrayed the coup as a mutiny. The commission concluded in its 1996 report that "the coup was carried out by officers highly placed in the line of command of the Burundian Army" but that it was "not in a position to identify the persons that should be brought to justice for this crime". Some low-ranking Tutsi soldiers interviewed by the commission accused Buyoya of involvement in the coup, but they were later killed in a prison riot.

Burundian authorities ultimately tried 117 people for involvement in Ndadaye's murder in 1999, during Buyoya's second presidency. Krueger characterised the proceedings as a "show trial". In May the Supreme Court of Burundi found 79 of those tried guilty of involvement. Five were sentenced to death: Kamana (who was in exile and tried in absentia), Laurent Nzeyimana, Juvenal Gahungu, Sylvere Nduwumukama, and Emmanuel Ndayizeye. The remaining 38 of those tried were acquitted, including Bikomagu, Ntakije, and Nibizi.

On 19 October 2020 the Supreme Court sentenced Buyoya to life in prison for Ndadaye's murder. Bernard Busokoza, Alphonse-Marie Kadege, and 16 others were also sentenced for involvement in the murder. Buyoya, who was abroad at the time serving as an envoy for the African Union, denounced the proceedings as "a political trial conducted in a scandalous manner" and resigned from his diplomatic position "in order to have full freedom to defend myself and clear my name". He died in December 2020.

== Works cited ==
- Amnesty International Report 1994. London: Amnesty International Publications. 1994. ISBN 978-0-86210-230-2.
- Amnesty International Report 1995. London: Amnesty International Publications. 1995. ISBN 978-0-86210-245-6.
- Akyeampong, Emmanuel Kwaku; Gates, Henry Louis, eds. (2012). Dictionary of African Biography. Oxford University Press USA. ISBN 9780195382075.
- Bundervoet, Tom (May 2009). "Livestock, Land and Political Power: The 1993 Killings in Burundi". Journal of Peace Research. 46 (3): 357–376. doi:10.1177/0022343309102657. S2CID 58245595.
- Butare, Innocent (2019). Une jeune femme sur un bateau ivre: Agathe Uwilingiyimana du Rwanda (in French). Africa Books Collective. ISBN 9789956550333.
- Červenka, Zdenek; Legum, Colin (1994). Can National Dialogue Break the Power of Terror in Burundi?: Report on the Impact of the International Conference National Dialogue Held in Bujumbura on May 15–18 on Burundian Efforts to Restore Democratic Process in the Country. Nordic Africa Institute. ISBN 9789171063533.
- Charny, Israel W., ed. (1999). Encyclopedia of Genocide: A–H. Vol. 1. ABC-CLIO. ISBN 9780874369281.
- Chretien, Jean-Pierre (May 1996). "Burundi: The Obsession with Genocide". Current History. 95 (601): 206–210. doi:10.1525/curh.1996.95.601.206. ISSN 0011-3530. S2CID 249701714.
- Chretien, Jean-Pierre; Mukuri, Melchior (2002). Burundi, la fracture identitaire: logiques de violence et certitudes ethniques, 1993-1996 (in French). Karthala Editions. ISBN 9782845863187.
- Daley, Patricia O. (2008). Gender & Genocide in Burundi: The Search for Spaces of Peace in the Great Lakes Region. African Issues. Bloomington: Indiana University Press. ISBN 978-0-253-35171-5.
- Des Forges, Alison (May 1994). "Burundi: Failed coup or creeping coup?". Current History. 93 (583): 203–207. doi:10.1525/curh.1994.93.583.203. ISSN 0011-3530.
- Falola, Toyin; Jean-Jacques, Daniel, eds. (2015). Africa: An Encyclopedia of Culture and Society. ABC-CLIO. ISBN 9781598846669.
- Giraudineau, Laurent (November 1993). "Burundi : La Démocratie Assassinée". Afrique Magazine (in French). No. 108. pp. 24–30, 34.
- Guichaoua, André (1995). Les crises politiques au Burundi et au Rwanda, 1993-1994: analyses, faits et documents (in French) (2nd ed.). Université des sciences et technologies de Lille. ISBN 9782909869018.
- International Commission of Inquiry for Burundi: Final Report (S/1996/682), New York: United Nations International Commission of Inquiry for Burundi, 1996
- Kaoutzanis, Christodoulos (2020). The UN Security Council and International Criminal Tribunals: Procedure Matters (online ed.). Cham: Springer International Publishing. ISBN 9783030237776.
- Krueger, Robert; Krueger, Kathleen Tobin (2007). From Bloodshed to Hope in Burundi: Our Embassy Years During Genocide (PDF). University of Texas Press. ISBN 9780292714861.
- Lansford, Tom, ed. (2017). Political Handbook of the World 2016-2017. Volume 1. Thousand Oaks, California: SAGE Publishing. ISBN 978-1-5063-2718-1.
- Legum, Colin, ed. (1994). Africa Contemporary Record 1992–1994. Vol. XXIV. New York: Africana Publishing Company. ISBN 978-0841905627.
- Lemarchand, René (1996). Burundi: Ethnic Conflict and Genocide (reprint ed.). Cambridge University Press. ISBN 9780521566230.
- Lemarchand, René (2012). The Dynamics of Violence in Central Africa. University of Pennsylvania Press. ISBN 9780812241204.
- Melvern, Linda (2000). A People Betrayed: The Role of the West in Rwanda's Genocide (reprint ed.). Zed Books. ISBN 9781856498319.
- Mekenkamp, Monique; van Tongeren, Paul; van de Veen, Hans (1999). Searching for Peace in Africa: An Overview of Conflict Prevention and Management Activities. European Platform for Conflict Prevention and Transformation. ISBN 9789057270338.
- Ndikumana, Léonce (April 1998). "Institutional Failure and Ethnic Conflicts in Burundi". African Studies Review. 41 (1): 29–47. doi:10.2307/524680. JSTOR 524680. S2CID 143482426.
- Prunier, Gérard (1997). The Rwanda Crisis: History of a Genocide (reprint ed.). Columbia University Press. ISBN 9780231104098.
- Reyntjens, Filip (December 1993). "The Proof of the Pudding is in the Eating: The June 1993 Elections in Burundi". The Journal of Modern African Studies. 31 (4): 563–583. doi:10.1017/S0022278X00012246. JSTOR 161291. S2CID 154612240.
- Reyntjens, Filip (1994). L'Afrique des grands lacs en crise: Rwanda, Burundi, 1988-1994 (in French). Karthala Editions. ISBN 9782811122508.
- Reyntjens, Filip (January 2006). "Briefing: Burundi: A Peaceful Transition after a Decade of War?". African Affairs. 105 (418): 117–135. doi:10.1093/afraf/adi092. JSTOR 3518791.
- Sebudandi, Gaëtan; Richard, Pierre-Olivier (1996). Le drame burundais: hantise du pouvoir ou tentation suicidaire (in French). Karthala Editions. ISBN 9782865376476.
- Thompson, Allan, ed. (2007). The Media and the Rwanda Genocide. London: Pluto Press. ISBN 9780745326252.
- Turner, Simon (2012). Politics of Innocence: Hutu Identity, Conflict and Camp Life. Berghahn Books. ISBN 9780857456090.
- Uvin, Peter (2013). Life after Violence: A People's Story of Burundi. Zed Books. ISBN 9781848137240.
- Watt, Nigel (2008). Burundi: Biography of a Small African Country. New York: Columbia University Press. ISBN 978-0-231-70090-0.
