= Cyriaque Simbizi =

Burundian politician

Personal details
- Born: Burundi
- Died: 6 April 1994; Kigali, Rwanda
- Political party: Front pour la Démocratie au Burundi (FRODEBU)

Cyriaque Simbizi (died 6 April 1994) was a Burundian Minister of Communication who was assassinated in a plane shootdown.

== Early life ==
Cyriaque Simbizi originated from Cankuzo Province, Burundi. Ethnically, he was Tutsi.

== Political career ==
Simbizi was originally a member of the Union pour le Progrès national (UPRONA), but switched his party affiliation to the Front pour la Démocratie au Burundi (FRODEBU) on 2 January 1994.

== Death ==
On 6 April 1994 Burundian President Cyprien Ntaryamira attended a regional summit in Dar es Salaam. Once the summit was over, Ntaryamira reportedly asked Rwandan President Juvénal Habyarimana if he could be taken home aboard the Rwandan Dassault Falcon 50 presidential jet, which was faster than his own propeller-driven plane. Habyarimana agreed and allowed Ntaryamira to accompany him along with two of his ministers, Simbizi and Bernard Ciza. At 8:23 PM as the jet was approaching Kigali International Airport, two surface-to-air rockets were fired, with the second missile striking it. The plane crashed, killing all aboard. Simbizi was buried in Bujumbura in a state funeral on 16 April alongside Ntaryamira and Ciza.

== Works cited ==
- Guichaoua, André (1995). Les crises politiques au Burundi et au Rwanda, 1993-1994: analyses, faits et documents (in French) (2nd ed.). Université des sciences et technologies de Lille. ISBN 9782909869018.
- Melvern, Linda (2000). A People Betrayed: The Role of the West in Rwanda's Genocide (reprint ed.). Zed Books. ISBN 9781856498319.
- Ntibantunganya, Sylvestre (1999). DÉMOCRATIE (UNE) POUR TOUS LES BURUNDAIS: La Guerre "ethno"-civile s'installe 1993-1996 (in French). Vol. 2. Editions L'Harmattan. ISBN 9782296356054.
