= United Nations Security Council Resolution 1012 =

UN Security Council Resolution 1012
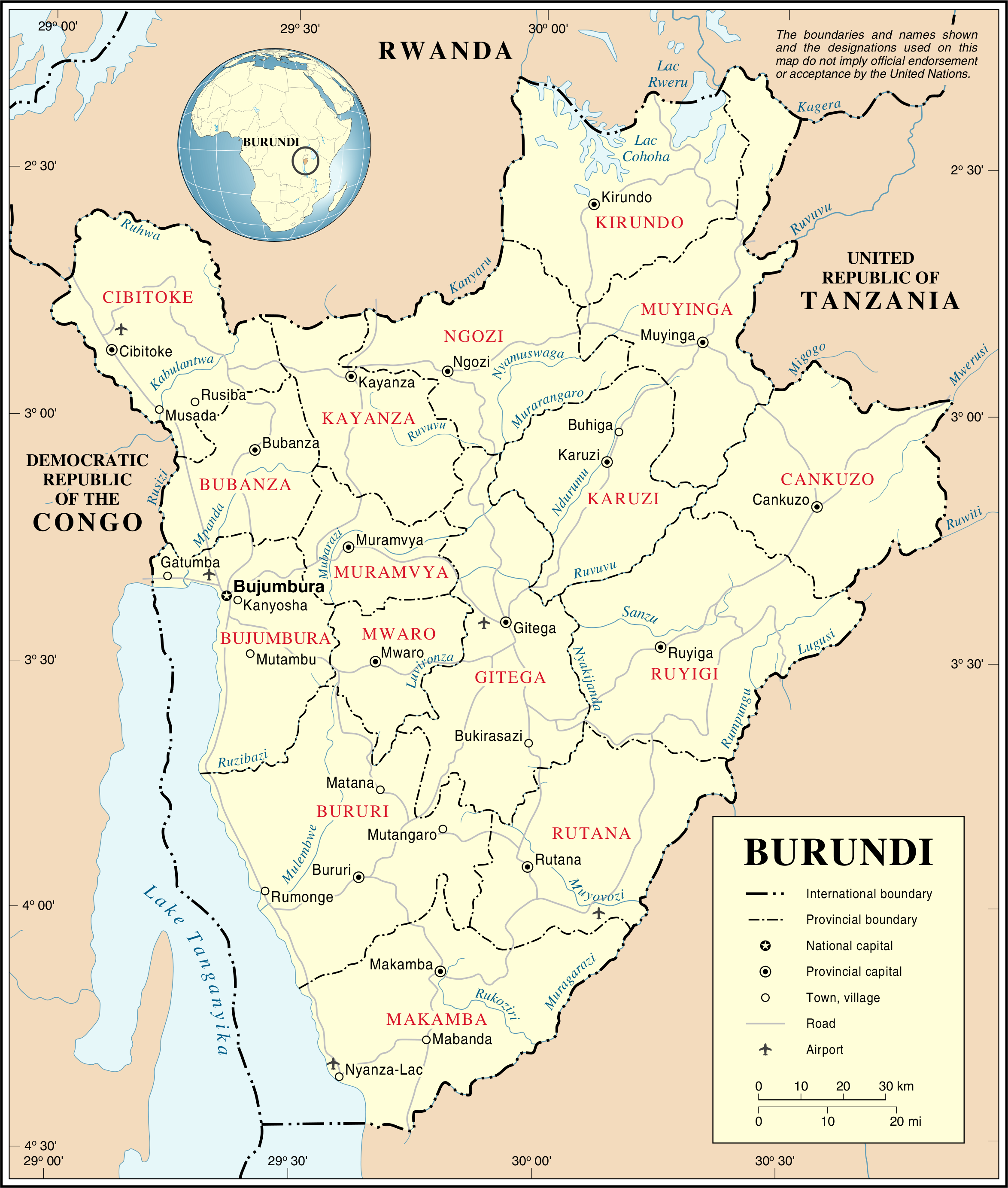
- Burundi
- Date: 28 August 1995
- Meeting no.: 3,571
- Code: S/RES/1012 (Document)
- Subject: Burundi
- Voting summary: 15 voted for; None voted against; None abstained
- Result: Adopted

Security Council composition
- Permanent members: China; France; Russia; United Kingdom; United States
- Non-permanent members: Argentina; Botswana; Czech Republic; Germany; Honduras; Indonesia; Italy; Nigeria; Oman; Rwanda

United Nations Security Council resolution 1012, adopted unanimously on 28 August 1995, after considering the situation in an African landlocked country, Burundi. The council established an international inquiry over the assassination of President Melchior Ndadaye (the first Hutu president of Burundi) during a military coup in October 1993.

== Background ==
On 21 October 1993, Burundi's first democratically elected Hutu president, Melchior Ndadaye, was assassinated by Tutsi extremists. As a result of the murder, violence broke out between the two groups, and an estimated 50,000 to 100,000 people died within a year. In 1994, Ndadaye's successor Cyprien Ntaryamira was assassinated in the same plane crash with Rwandan President Juvenal Habyarimana. This act marked the beginning of the Rwandan genocide, while in Burundi, the death of Ntaryamira exacerbated the violence and unrest, although there was no general massacre. Sylvestre Ntibantunganya was installed to a 4-year presidency on 8 April, but the security situation further declined. The influx of hundreds of thousands of Rwandan refugees and the activities of armed Hutu and Tutsi groups further destabilised the regime.

== Resolution ==
After considering a report from a fact-finding mission to Burundi, the Council noted that an international committee would play a role in the investigation of the coup in 1993 and the subsequent massacre. The inquiry was a recommendation of the Secretary-General Boutros Boutros-Ghali and the Government of Burundi itself had called for its establishment and the massacres to be termed genocide. Violations of international humanitarian law had been committed in Burundi and the country's judicial system had to be strengthened. There was also serious concern about the resumption of radio broadcasts that called for ethnic hatred, and those responsible for violations would be held responsible.

The Security Council then asked the Secretary-General to establish an international inquiry with the following mandate:

(a) to investigate the murder of the President of Burundi on 21 October 1993 and the subsequent massacre;
(b) to propose measures to bring those responsible to justice.

The international commission would consist of five jurists selected by the Secretary-General. All countries and organisations with information were asked to provide it to the committee. Within three months, Boutros-Ghali was requested to report on the workings of the commission.

All parties and institutions in Burundi were urged to co-operate with the commission of inquiry, by:

(a) adopting measures so that the committee can work freely;
(b) providing information to the commission that it requests;
(c) permit the commission to collect all relevant information;
(d) allow the commission to interrogate anyone;
(e) allow the commission to visit any place at any time;
(f) guaranteeing the safety, security and to respect freedom of witnesses.

== See also ==
- Burundi Civil War
- History of Burundi
- List of United Nations Security Council Resolutions 1001 to 1100 (1995–1997)
