= Bernard Ciza =

Burundian politician

Minister of State for Development Planning and Reconstruction of Burundi
- In office February 1994 – 6 April 1994

Deputy Prime Minister for Economic and Social Affairs of Burundi
- In office 10 July 1993 – February 1994

Personal details
- Born: Bururi Province, Ruanda-Urundi
- Died: 6 April 1994 Kigali, Rwanda
- Party: Front pour la Démocratie au Burundi

Bernard Ciza (died 6 April 1994) was a Burundian politician. Originating from Bururi Province, he became a leading member of the Front pour la Démocratie au Burundi (FRODEBU) and in 1993 became Deputy Prime Minister for Economic and Social Affairs under Prime Minister Sylvie Kinigi. He survived the coup attempt of October 1993 and in February 1994 became Minister of State for Development Planning and Reconstruction. He died later that year when the plane on which he was traveling was shot down over Kigali.

== Early life ==
Bernard Ciza was ethnically Hutu and originated from Bururi Province, Burundi. He married a woman, Charlotte.

== Political career ==
By 1993 Ciza served as a member of the central committee of the Front pour la Démocratie au Burundi (FRODEBU). Following the 1993 elections in Burundi, he became Deputy Prime Minister for Economic and Social Affairs under Prime Minister Sylvie Kinigi. On 21 October Tutsi army officers launched a coup in an attempt to overthrow the government. Ciza and fellow Deputy Prime Minister Melchior Ntahobama were betrayed by their military guards and were imprisoned. However, a few hours later a junior military officer freed them and asked them where they wished to go. Ciza was taken to the French embassy. The coup eventually faltered and the civilian government was reinstated. In February 1994 a new government was sworn-in under Prime Minister Anatole Kanyenkiko, and Ciza became Minister of State for Development Planning and Reconstruction.

== Death ==
On 6 April 1994 Burundian President Cyprien Ntaryamira attended a regional summit in Dar es Salaam. Once the summit was over, Ntaryamira reportedly asked Rwandan President Juvénal Habyarimana if he could be taken home aboard the Rwandan Dassault Falcon 50 presidential jet, which was faster than his own propeller-driven plane. Habyarimana agreed and allowed Ntaryamira to accompany him along with two of his ministers, Ciza and Cyriaque Simbizi. At 8:23 PM as the jet was approaching Kigali International Airport, two surface-to-air rockets were fired, with the second missile striking it. The plane crashed, killing all aboard. Ciza was buried in Bujumbura in a state funeral on 16 April alongside Ntaryamira and Simbizi. His ministerial portfolio was taken over by Minister of Finance Salvator Toyi.

== Works cited ==
- Guichaoua, André (1995). Les crises politiques au Burundi et au Rwanda, 1993-1994: analyses, faits et documents (in French) (2nd ed.). Université des sciences et technologies de Lille. ISBN 9782909869018.
- Keesing's Record of World Events. Vol. 40. Longman. 1994. ISSN 0950-6128.
- Krueger, Robert; Krueger, Kathleen Tobin (2007). From Bloodshed to Hope in Burundi : Our Embassy Years During Genocide (PDF). University of Texas Press. ISBN 9780292714861.
- Melvern, Linda (2000). A People Betrayed: The Role of the West in Rwanda's Genocide (reprint ed.). Zed Books. ISBN 9781856498319.
