= Perpétue Nshimirimana =

Burundian diplomat and writer

Permanent Representative of Burundi to the United Nations in Geneva
- In office 1993 – 1993
- President: Melchior Ndadaye

Personal details
- Born: February 1961 (age 65) Bujumbura

Perpétue Nshimirimana (born February 1961) is a Burundian diplomat and writer.

Born in Bujumbura, Nshimirimana studied at the Lycée Clarté Notre Dame de Bujumbura before travelling to Algeria for university, where she received a diploma in journalism from the Institut National des Sciences de l'Information et de la Communication. She returned home in 1984 to work at the Radio Télévision Nationale du Burundi. She served as a member of the National Council on Communication and the National UNESCO Commission. From 1991 to 1992, she was a constitutional commission member, and in 1993, she served on the national electoral commission. After the election of Melchior Ndadaye as president, Nshimirimana was named Permanent Representative of Burundi to the United Nations in Geneva, a role which ended with the assassination of Ndadaye later in 1993. As of 2015, she lived in Switzerland. In 2005, she received the "Femme exilée, Femme engages" prize for her work with Burundian orphans.

Nshimirimana's autobiography, Lettre à Isidore, was published in 2004.
