= Gilles Bimazubute =

- Born: 1934
- Died: 21 October 1993 (aged 58–59); Bujumbura, Burundi
- Cause of death: Assassination
- Resting place: Bujumbura, Burundi
- Occupations: Politician, civil servant

Gilles Bimazubute (1934 – 21 October 1993) was a Burundian politician.

== Early life ==
Gilles Bimazubute was born in 1934 in the Ijenda region, Ruanda-Urundi. He was a member of the Abasapfu clan of the Tutsi ethnic group. He attended the Official University of the Congo and Ruanda-Urundi in Élisabethville from 1958 until his expulsion in 1961. In 1959 he and Prime Nyongabo founded the Union Culturelle de la Jeunesse Africaine du Burundi (UCJAB), a youth nationalist organisation. In 1961 UCJAB was renamed Jeunesse Nationaliste Rwagasore (JNR). The following year he was arrested for a short time. He was married to the niece of politician André Muhirwa.

== Career ==
In 1962 Bimazubute was appointed director of Radio Burundi. He resigned to take up a position at Hatton & Cookson, a British trading firm with offices in Bujumbura. In 1963 he was appointed chef de cabinet in the Burundian Ministry of Foreign Affairs. From that September he served as acting Minister of Foreign Affairs for three months. In late 1964 he earned a scholarship to study in France. He subsequently studied law at the University of Paris from 1964 to 1966, but did not complete his studies. While there, he wrote for the Belgian left-wing monthly publication, Remarques Africaines. In 1965 and 1966 he penned several articles criticising the Burundian monarchy and calling for the institution of a republican political system.

In 1966 ex-army officer Michel Micombero launched a coup in Burundi, deposing the monarchy and becoming President of Burundi. In December his government invited Bimazubute back to the country and appointed him head of the new government radio station, La Voix de la Révolution (The Voice of the Revolution). He also became Director General of the Ministry of Information and on 17 January 1967 was made secretary general to the presidency. Not personally close to Micombero, he and Albert Shibura pushed the regime's policies leftward and advanced an anti-clerical view. Bimazubute attempted to arrange a diplomatic rapprochement between Burundi and China, but Micombero vetoed this proposal. He subsequently helped Minister of Foreign Affairs Prime Niyongabo arrange for a North Korean delegation to visit Burundi over the president's opposition on 5 March. Angered by what he saw as leftist subversion, on 13 March Micombero purged his cabinet, and Bimazubute was demoted to Director General of the Ministry of Information.

Late in the night on 5 May at a bar in Bujumbura a large fight broke out among members of the Jeunesses Révolutionnaires Rwagasore, with one side showing fidelity to Micombero and the other holding more ideological left leanings. As a result, Micombero decided to arrest left-leaning politicians; Bimazubute was detained on 9 May. He was released in November and again appointed Director General of the Ministry of Information. In May 1968 he was given the additional posting of Director General of the Ministry of Foreign Affairs. That year he was also made Minister of Interior, and in August he was given the portfolio of the civil service and made Secretary General of the Union pour le Progrès National (UPRONA). Bimazubute's wide responsibilities provoked internal ire, as his detractors argued he held too many posts and did not perform well enough in any of them. Micombero also continued to distrust his ideological politics, and in August 1969 Bimazubute was dismissed from all of his offices.

In September 1969 Bimazubute was placed on the Bujumbura Conseil du Sages. On 20 December he was made Director General of the Ministry of Education. In January 1971 he became chef de cabinet in the Ministry of Foreign Affairs. In May he was appointed Ambassador to Zaire. While there he cultivated good relations with President Mobutu Sese Seko and was impressed with his policy of Authenticité, which promoted indigenous language and culture. On 14 July 1972 Bimazubute was recalled to Burundi and made Minister of Education. Inspired by Authenticité, he adopted several reforms in the Burundian education system, including the institution of Kirundi as the language of instruction in primary schools. He also ordered the consolidation of schools following the Ikiza, an event in which the army massacred thousands of educated Hutus, driving many students and teachers out of the country. His good relations with Mobutu led him to be appointed Minister of Foreign Affairs and International Cooperation in 1974, reportedly at Mobutu's urging. He was dismissed in late 1975.

In his later life Bimazubute served as an executive member of the Burundi Bible Society. In the early 1990s Burundi underwent a democratic transition and returned to multi-party politics. In February 1991 Bimazubute became one of the twelve founding members of the Iteka League, a human rights association. He also joined the Front pour la Démocratie au Burundi (FRODEBU). Following the June 1993 legislative elections, he became Vice-President of the National Assembly.

== Death ==
During the 1993 Burundian coup d'état attempt launched by Tutsi army officers early in the morning on 21 October, Bimazubute was collected by soldiers from his residence. Though a Tutsi, he was a proponent of majority rule and was thus regarded as a traitor by the putschists. Bimazubute insisted on dressing in a full suit and tie before the soldiers took him away. The putschists soon thereafter killed him and buried him and the other victims of their coup attempt in a mass grave in the centre of Camp Muha. After several hours the soldiers realised that international opinion would strongly disapprove of such treatment of the bodies, so they exhumed them and allowed family members to collect them. He was the only Tutsi killed during the coup attempt. He and the other coup victims were reburied on 6 December in Bujumbura. The deaths of President Melchior Ndadaye, President of the National Assembly Pontien Karibwami, and Bimazubute eliminated the constitutionally-delineated presidential line of succession. Christian Sendegaya succeeded Bimazubute as Vice-President of the National Assembly on 23 December.

== Works cited ==
- Guichaoua, André (1995). Les crises politiques au Burundi et au Rwanda, 1993-1994: analyses, faits et documents (in French) (2nd ed.). Université des sciences et technologies de Lille. ISBN 9782909869018.
- Krueger, Robert; Krueger, Kathleen Tobin (2007). From Bloodshed to Hope in Burundi : Our Embassy Years During Genocide (PDF). University of Texas Press. ISBN 9780292714861.
- Lemarchand, René (1970). Rwanda and Burundi. New York: Praeger Publishers. OCLC 254366212.
- Russell, Aiden (2019). Politics and Violence in Burundi: The Language of Truth in an Emerging State. Cambridge University Press. ISBN 9781108499347.
- Uvin, Peter (2013). Life after Violence: A People's Story of Burundi. Zed Books. ISBN 9781848137240.
- Weinstein, Warren (1976). Historical Dictionary of Burundi. Metuchen: Scarecrow Press. ISBN 9780810809628.
