= Burundi Workers' Party =

Defunct political party of Burundi

Burundi Workers' Party Parti des travailleurs du Burundi Umugambwe w'Abakozi b'Uburundi
- Abbreviation: UBU
- Founder: Salvator Buyagu; Cyprien Ntaryamira; Melchior Ndadaye; Jérôme Ndiho; Festus Ntanyungu; Jean Ndikumana; Sylvestre Ntibantunganya
- Founded: December 1979; 46 years ago
- Dissolved: 1986; 40 years ago
- Succeeded by: Front for Democracy in Burundi
- Ideology: Communism; Marxism-Leninism; Hutu interests
- Political position: Far-left

Burundi Workers' Party (French: Parti des travailleurs du Burundi, PTB; Kirundi: Umugambwe w'Abakozi b'Uburundi, UBU) was a clandestine Marxist-Leninist party in Burundi. Its primary constituency was the large Burundian refugee population situated in neighboring Rwanda.

UBU was one of two movements that emerged from the MEPROBA (Mouvement des étudiants progressistes barundi), a leftist student organization created in exile in Belgium at the beginning of the 1970s following the ethno-political massacres of 1965 and 1969. In the aftermath of the1972 Ikiza, MEPROBA was split over debates on whether to focus on ethnicity or to maintain a more orthodox Marxist analysis, the two factions developing into the TABARA and UBU respectively. The party was founded in December 1979 by Salvator Buyagu, Cyprien Ntaryamira, Melchior Ndadaye, Jérôme Ndiho, Festus Ntanyungu, Jean Ndikumana, Sylvestre Ntibantunganya, and several others.

When UBU was disbanded, followers of Ndadaye regrouped into the Front for Democracy in Burundi (FRODÉBU).

== Sources ==
- Eggers, Ellen K. Historical dictionary of Burundi. 2nd ed. Lanham: Scarecrow Press, 1997. (ISBN 0-8108-3261-5)
