= Cyprien Ntaryamira =

President of Burundi in 1994

- Ntaryamira in 1994

5th President of Burundi
- In office 5 February 1994 – 6 April 1994
- Prime Minister: Anatole Kanyenkiko
- Preceded by: Sylvie Kinigi (acting)
- Succeeded by: Sylvestre Ntibantunganya

Personal details
- Born: 6 March 1955 Mubimbi, Bujumbura Rural Province, Ruanda-Urundi
- Died: 6 April 1994 (aged 39) Kigali, Rwanda
- Cause of death: Assassination (surface-to-air missile)
- Party: Burundi Workers' Party (1979–1986); Front for Democracy in Burundi (1986–1994)
- Spouse: Sylvana Mpabwanayo
- Education: National University of Rwanda

Cyprien Ntaryamira (6 March 1955 – 6 April 1994) was a Burundian politician who served as President of Burundi from 5 February 1994 until his assassination two months later in the context of the Burundian Civil War.

A Hutu born in Burundi, Ntaryamira studied there before fleeing to Rwanda to avoid ethnic violence and complete his education. Active in a Burundian student movement, he cofounded the socialist Burundi Workers' Party and earned an agricultural degree. In 1983, he returned to Burundi and worked agricultural jobs, though he was briefly detained as a political prisoner. In 1986 he cofounded the Front for Democracy in Burundi (FRODEBU), and in 1993 FRODEBU won Burundi's general elections. He subsequently became the Minister of Agriculture and Animal Husbandry on 10 July under the rule of Burundi's new FRODEBU president Melchior Ndadaye, but in October Tutsi soldiers killed Ndadaye and other top officials in an attempted coup, inciting the civil war.

Ntaryamira survived the putsch and in January 1994 the National Assembly elected him to succeed Ndadaye as the President of Burundi. After a prolonged constitutional dispute, he was inaugurated on 5 February, declaring that his top priorities would be restoring peace, promoting human rights, and resettling refugees. Throughout his tenure he unsuccessfully sought to mitigate ethnic conflict. He was killed on 6 April 1994 when the plane he was travelling in with Rwandan president Juvénal Habyarimana was shot down over Kigali.

== Early life ==
Cyprien Ntaryamira was born on 6 March 1955 in the Mageyo Zone's commune of Mubimbi, Bujumbura Rural Province, Ruanda-Urundi. Ethnically, he was Hutu and the sixth of eleven children in his family. He attended primary school in Rushubi before enrolling in the Collège du Saint-Ésprit in Bujumbura in 1968.

In 1972 a Hutu rebellion against the regime of Tutsi president Michel Micombero led to a wave of anti-Hutu genocidal repression inflicted by the Burundian Army. According to his cousin, François Ngeze, government administrator Basile Gateretse hid Ngeze and Ntaryamira in his home for two weeks. Once the authorities became suspicious, Gateretse arranged for the two of them to flee across the Ruzizi River into Zaire. Thousands of Hutus ultimately fled the country. Ntaryamira eventually went to Rwanda. He reentered school at Rilima College in Kigali Prefecture, studying there from 1973 to 1976. He subsequently attended the National University of Rwanda, earning a bachelor's of science degree and a degree in agriculture engineering in 1976 and 1979, respectively. He married Sylvana Mpabwanayo in 1985 and had three children with her.

== Political career ==
While abroad, Ntaryamira maintained an interest in Burundian politics and in 1976 cofounded a student movement, known as the Movement of Progressive Barundi Students (Mouvement des Etudiants Progressistes Barundi). He served as head of its information department. In August 1979, some of the student movement members founded the Burundi Workers' Party (Umugambwe wa'Bakozi Uburundi, UBU), a revolutionary socialist political party. By 1981 he sat on its central committee as its national secretary responsible for economic and social questions. He returned to Burundi in March 1983 and was hired as an advisor in the Burundian General Directorate of Agricultural Planning. He also established a hen-breeding business in Mubimbi. The following January he took charge of the Compagnie de Gérance du Coton's northern cotton region. In May 1985 he was arrested and held at Mpimba prison for working with a subversive political movement—UBU. Incarcerated for a year, he was reportedly freed at the request of the wife of President Jean-Baptiste Bagaza, a childhood friend of his.

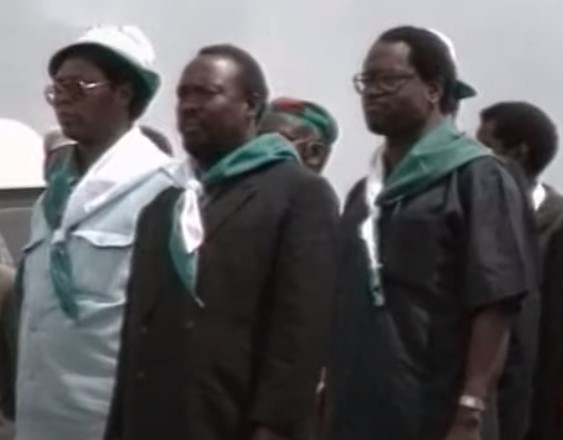
Ntaryamira (centre) at a FRODEBU rally in 1993. Melchior Ndadaye stands to the right.

As the Cold War wound down Ntaryamira, Melchior Ndadaye, and several other UBU members sought to move away from socialist ideology in favor of embracing democracy and electoral processes, as was more acceptable to the international community. Ntaryamira was viewed as politically moderate with regards to ethnic issues, believing Hutus could work with the Tutsi minority to govern Burundi. In August 1986 Ntaryamira, Ndadaye, and 10 others founded the Front for Democracy in Burundi (Front pour la Démocratie au Burundi, FRODEBU). Ntaryamira served in its political bureau and was responsible for creating the party's economic policies. In December 1987 he was appointed Burundi's Director General of Agriculture and Livestock. FRODEBU gained power after Burundi's first democratic presidential and parliamentary elections, which ended a long history of rule by military officers of the Tutsi minority and the Union for National Progress (Union pour le Progrès national, UPRONA). Ndadaye became president. Ntaryamira was elected to a seat in the National Assembly, representing the Bujumbura Rural constituency. On 10 July 1993, he was appointed Minister of Agriculture and Animal Husbandry, serving under Prime Minister Sylvie Kinigi. In that capacity he appointed several Tutsis to key posts in the agriculture ministry.

At about midnight on 20/21 October 1993, members of the Burundian Army launched a coup attempt and attacked the presidential palace in an attempt to capture Ndadaye. The president's wife called Ntaryamira to warn him of what was occurring. Fearing he would be targeted, Ntaryamira hid in his neighbours' home, who were Tutsis. When soldiers did not find him in his own residence, they went there asking for his whereabouts. The matriarch of the household told the soldiers that Ntaryamira had fled down the road, and they quickly departed. He then hid in a foreign embassy for the remainder of the coup attempt. Ndadaye and the other officials in the line of presidential succession—the President and Vice-President of the National Assembly—were ultimately killed, creating a power vacuum. The assassination also sparked massive violence, as Hutus massacred Tutsis in rural areas and the army retaliated by murdering Hutus, leading to tens of thousands of deaths and creating a large outflow of refugees.

On 9 January 1994, the National Assembly modified Article 85 of the Burundian constitution, empowering itself to elect the next president of Burundi. FRODEBU set about trying to name a successor to Ndadaye, and this stoked a rivalry between Sylvestre Ntibantunganya and Léonard Nyangoma. By his own account, Ntibantunganya decided to withdraw himself as a candidate despite having the support of the central committee, citing his desire to focus on party matters, and Jean‐Marie Ngendahayo suggested that FRODEBU back Ntaryamira for the position instead. In contrast, former president Pierre Buyoya alleged that Ntaryamira was "imposed" by other FRODEBU figures and some party outsiders to circumvent the rivalry. The opposition viewed Ntaryamira as free of involvement in the 1993 massacres of Tutsis, and he was offered as a "consensus" candidate. On 13 January, the National Assembly elected Ntaryamira to become president in a vote, 78 to one.

Ntaryamira was scheduled to be inaugurated on 22 January, but the parliamentary opposition, led by UPRONA, filed a suit with the Constitutional Court to block the installment. They argued that Article 182 of the constitution, which stipulated that the document could not be modified in times of national crisis, rendered the National Assembly's amending of Article 85 void. FRODEBU parliamentarians argued that the change was necessary to fill the vacancy, since holding a national election to replace the former president would have been impossible. The Constitutional Court ruled in favor of the opposition in a decision split along ethnic lines. The Hutu justices subsequently resigned and the government dismissed the Tutsi justices. This led to several days of violence in Bujumbura, but on 3 February the government and opposition parties reached an agreement to install Ntaryamira as president with an UPRONA prime minister, as well as reinstate the Constitutional Court. Ntaryamira was sworn in on 5 February. In his inaugural address, he declared that his top priorities would be to restore peace, promote human rights, and resettle thousands of Burundian refugees and internally displaced persons. His government consisted of a broad coalition including Hutu and Tutsi members from FRODEBU and UPRONA. Anatole Kanyenkiko, an UPRONA politician, was made prime minister. Kanyenkiko's selection did not satisfy many UPRONA leaders, and while Ntaryamira allowed several other top party figures into his government, he blocked the appointment of those whom he considered responsible for the violence in the capital.

During Ntaryamira's presidency, Burundi was troubled with severe ethnic violence and an economic crisis triggered by the conflict and low rainfall. He reorganised the National Intelligence Service — appointing Domitien Ndayizeye to head it—and the Migration services and attempted to reform municipal police. He also announced that he would appoint a commission to investigate atrocities committed in Bujumbura.

In an attempt to demobilise civilian militias, his government dispatched delegations to meet with the groups, but these entreaties failed as the emissaries were fired upon. His government then attempted to use the army to stop the militias, but in late March the army became entangled in ethnic conflict in the capital and, acting autonomously from the government, exclusively targeted Hutu neighborhoods for disarmament. In a radio broadcast, Ntaryamira appealed to the army to withdraw to end the fighting. His support for national disarmament and for a European embargo on arms exports to Burundi brought him into disagreement with Kanyenkiko, who wanted a harsh crackdown on rebel groups and thought an embargo infringed on the country's sovereignty. Ultimately, his efforts to stem the ethnic violence were unsuccessful. He maintained close diplomatic ties with President Mobutu Sese Seko of Zaire and President Ali Hassan Mwinyi of Tanzania. He was also rumoured to have daily phone conversations with Rwandan President Juvénal Habyarimana. On 4 April, he met with Mobutu and Habyarimana in Gbadolite to discuss regional security issues.

== Death ==
=== Aircraft shootdown ===
On 6 April 1994 Ntaryamira attended a regional summit in Dar es Salaam called by Mwinyi to discuss maintaining peace in Burundi. However, the focus of the meeting quickly turned towards the implementation of the Arusha Accords, a peace agreement designed to end the Rwandan Civil War. The delegates chastised President Habyarimana for stalling the peace process, and Ntaryamira criticised him for heightening local tensions and thereby jeopardising the national security of Burundi.

Once the summit was over, Ntaryamira reportedly asked Habyarimana if he could be taken home aboard the Rwandan Dassault Falcon 50 presidential jet, which was faster than his own propeller-driven plane. A stop in the Rwandan capital, Kigali, would also allow him to pick up his wife who was there. Habyarimana agreed and allowed Ntaryamira to accompany him along with two Burundian ministers. Some observers have speculated that Habyarimana feared he was in danger and thought that the presence of another head of state on his aircraft would deter attacks. At 8:23 PM as the jet was approaching Kigali International Airport, two surface-to-air rockets were fired, with the second missile striking it. The plane crashed, killing all aboard. The precise identity of the attackers who launched the rockets remains unknown. Some people believe Hutu extremists unhappy with Habyarimana's decision to sign the Arusha Accords were responsible, while others have alleged that Rwandan rebel leader Paul Kagame ordered the assassination.

=== Political consequences ===
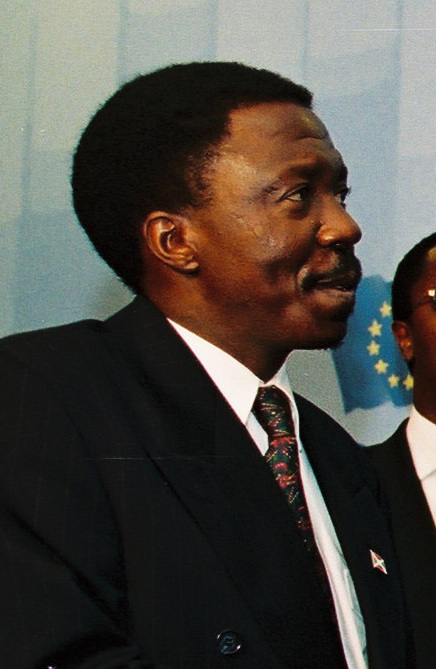
Ntaryamira was succeeded as President of Burundi by Sylvestre Ntibantunganya (pictured).

Observers feared that Ntaryamira's death would lead to widespread violence in Burundi, as had happened when Ndadaye was killed in October 1993. However, unlike in Rwanda, where the shootdown sparked a genocide, the situation in Burundi remained peaceful after word was received of its president's death. The Burundian government initially declared that the plane crash was caused by an accident and President of the National Assembly Sylvestre Ntibantunganya made a broadcast on television, flanked by the minister of defence and the army chief of staff, appealing for calm. Several hundred Tutsis marched through the capital to celebrate the deaths of the presidents. Diplomats reported that most Burundians believed that the assassination was meant to target Habyarimana, not Ntaryamira.

Ntibantunganya attributed Ntaryamira's death to "the facts of circumstance" and believed that he was not targeted. Ntibantunganya succeeded Ntaryamira as interim president. The Kanyenkiko government officially resigned but stayed in office to manage daily affairs pending the confirmation of its replacement. As Ntibantunganya was only viewed as having assumed the presidency in an interim fashion, new power sharing discussions between FRODEBU and the opposition parties began while ethnic tensions remained high and violence spread throughout the country. On 20 April the Constitutional Court again ruled that the amendment which allowed the National Assembly to elect Ntaryamira president was unconstitutional. An agreement was reached in September, whereby the National Assembly elected Ntibantunganya to a four-year term of office while 45% of positions in the cabinet were allocated to the opposition. Regardless, violence increased as the army purged Hutu civilians and numerous rebel groups formed to fight against it.

=== Burial and commemoration ===
Ntaryamira's body was heavily mutilated in the crash; his corpse was identified at about 03:00 on 7 April 1994. On 16 April 1994, a requiem mass was held for him at the Regina Mundi Cathedral in Bujumbura, attended by thousands of people, and he was subsequently buried on the grounds of the presidential palace.

Historians Jean-Pierre Chrétien and Melchior Mukuri wrote of Ntaryamira's presidency, "It is difficult to draw up an assessment for a regime which only worked for two months and in an immediately very tense atmosphere." Ntaryamira's death is commemorated annually by the Burundian government on 6 April. His killing in the plane shootdown has generally been overshadowed in public memory by Habyarimana's death and the subsequent Rwandan genocide. On 6 April 2017, his widow wrote a letter to President Pierre Nkurunziza, asking that the Burundian government recognise Ntaryamira as a national hero and request that the United Nations launch an international investigation into the downing of his plane. In April 2021, a government spokesperson indicated that the government was considering its options for further exploring the details of the shootdown.

== See also ==
- List of heads of state and government who died in aviation accidents and incidents
- List of heads of state and government who were assassinated or executed

Political offices
Preceded by Sylvie Kinigi	President of Burundi; 1994	Succeeded by Sylvestre Ntibantunganya
