= CNDD =

CNDD may refer to:

- National Council for the Defense of Democracy, Burundi
- National Council for Democracy and Development, Guinea
- National Council for the Defense of Democracy–Forces for the Defense of Democracy (CNDD-FDD)
