= Sylvestre Ntibantunganya =

6th president of Burundi (1994–96)

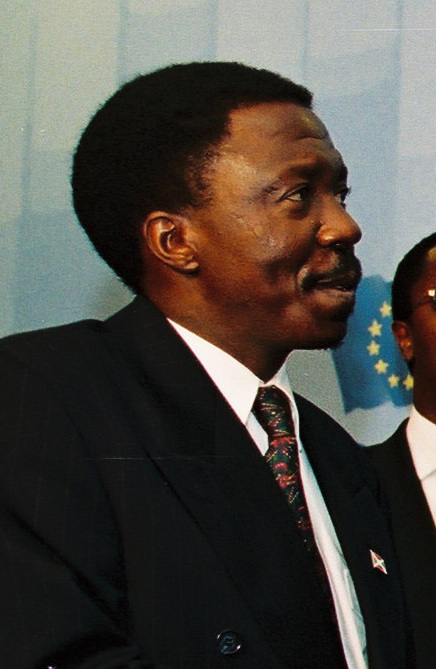
- Ntibantunganya in 1994

6th President of Burundi
- In office 6 April 1994 – 25 July 1996
- Prime Minister: Anatole Kanyenkiko (1994–1995); Antoine Nduwayo (1995–1996)
- Preceded by: Cyprien Ntaryamira
- Succeeded by: Pierre Buyoya

President of the National Assembly of Burundi
- In office 23 December 1993 – 30 September 1994

Minister of Foreign Affairs of Burundi
- In office 10 July 1993 – 22 December 1993

Personal details
- Born: 8 May 1956 (age 70) Commune of Gishubi, Gitega, Burundi
- Party: Front for Democracy in Burundi (FRODEBU); Burundi Workers' Party (UBU)
- Spouse(s): Eusébie Nshimirimana (until 1993); Pascasie Minani (from 1995)
- Occupation: Politician • Author

Sylvestre Ntibantunganya (born 8 May 1956) is a Burundian politician. He was President of the National Assembly of Burundi from 23 December 1993 to 30 September 1994, and President of Burundi from 6 April 1994 to 25 July 1996 (interim to October 1994).

A Hutu, Ntibantunganya became involved in politics in the 1970s, eventually joining the Marxism-influenced Burundi Workers' Party (UBU) before leaving it to cofound the Front for Democracy in Burundi (FRODEBU) in 1986. After working as a journalist for Burundi National Radio and Television during the 1980s, Ntibantunganya was elected to Burundi's National Assembly following FRODEBU's victory in the country's multiparty elections in June 1993 over the Union for National Progress (UPRONA), the Tutsi dominated-party that had ruled Burundi as a one-party state since 1966. He was named Minister of Foreign Affairs the following month under Burundi's new president, party-mate Melchior Ndadaye.

Ndadaye's assassination during a coup attempt in October after three months in power provoked the Burundian Civil War between Tutsis and Hutus. During this time, he was named President of the National Assembly two months later. The assassination of Ndadaye's successor Cyprien Ntaryamira in April 1994 made Ntibantunganya the interim president in the midst of the civil war, becoming the permanent President in October of that year.

During the war, he was overthrown during a coup in 1996, and was replaced by former UPRONA president Pierre Buyoya. Following the end of the war in 2005, Ntibantunganya became a senator for life under the civil war's peace accords until 2018. He also ran as an unsuccessful candidate in the 2015 Burundian presidential election.

== Early life ==
Sylvestre Ntibantunganya was born on 8 May 1956 in the Commune of Gishubi, Gitega Province. He is an ethnic Hutu. As a child he intended on becoming a priest, and thus after finishing primary school he attended Mugera seminary. He left after his first semester and then attended university. He graduated in 1984 with a bachelor's degree in history and geography and sought out a teaching position but could not obtain one. From April 1984 to December 1987 he worked as a journalist for Burundi National Radio and Television.

== Political career ==
=== Early activities and FRODEBU ===
In the 1970s Ntibantunganya was a member of the Movement of Progressive Barundi Students (Mouvement des Etudiants Progressistes Barundi). In August 1979 some of the student movement members founded the Burundi Workers' Party (Umugambwe wa'Bakozi Uburundi, UBU), a revolutionary socialist political party. To join the party, an applicant had to be sponsored by a member and was accepted on a probationary basis while they were educated in Marxism. Ntibantunganya was sponsored by one of the founding members and after three months became a full member of the party. By 1981 he sat on its central committee as its national secretary for external relations. UBU developed two factions, with the first advocating armed revolution and the second—led by Ntibantunganya and Melchior Ndadaye—advocating democracy and political freedom. As a result of these ideological divisions, the two men left UBU in 1983.

In 1988, President Pierre Buyoya decreed the creation of a 24-person commission to study ethnic divisions in Burundi and create a plan for national unity. Ntibantunganya served on the panel, which produced a Charter of National Unity, but it was denounced by Hutu members of the political opposition for being dominated by Tutsis and presenting an elitist point of view of the country. Ntibantunganya later called the project a failure. In May 1991 he founded Tujujurane, a Kirundi newspaper. He cofounded the Front pour la Démocratie au Burundi (FRODEBU) in 1986 and for a time edited its official newspaper, L'Aube de la Démocratie (lit. 'Dawn of Democracy'), and in 1993 served on the party's central committee.

=== Minister of Foreign Affairs and President of the National Assembly ===
In Burundi's legislative elections held on 29 June 1993, Ntibantunganya was elected to a seat in the National Assembly representing Gitega. He became Minister of Foreign Affairs in Prime Minister Sylvie Kinigi's government on 10 July.

Early in the morning on 21 October 1993 Tutsi soldiers in the Burundian Army launched a coup and attacked the presidential palace. The president's wife called Ntibantunganya called to warn him about the putsch. Thus informed, he began calling FRODEBU leaders in an attempt to rally the government and warned Minister of Communications Jean‐Marie Ngendahayo. He also called the chargé d'affaires at the United States embassy and extracted his assurances that the United States government would condemn the coup. He then resolved to flee. Distrustful of his military guard, Ntibantunganya changed into his gardener's clothes and walked to a friend's home, where he remained in hiding for the next two days. His wife, Eusébie Nshimirimana, was murdered by soldiers while attempting to hide at a different home, though their infant child survived. He subsequently found refuge at the French embassy with Kinigi and other government officials. President Ndadaye was ultimately killed in the coup, as were the other officials in the presidential line of succession. Ntibantunganya later recalled the night of the coup as his saddest memory. Ndadaye's death left him the interim leader of FRODEBU. He resigned as Minister of Foreign Affairs on 22 December 1993. The following day he was elected President of the National Assembly.

FRODEBU also set about trying to name a new president. This stoked a rivalry between Ntibantunganya and another FRODEBU cofounder, Léonard Nyangoma. By his own account, Ntibantunganya decided to withdraw himself as a candidate despite having the support of the central committee, citing his desire to focus on party matters, and Ngendahayo suggested that FRODEBU back Cyprien Ntaryamira for the position instead. FRODEBU reached an agreement with the opposition, whereby Ntaryamira was sworn-in as President of Burundi on 5 February 1994 with a new government.

=== President of Burundi ===
On 6 April 1994 President Ntaryamira was traveling on a Rwandan plane with Rwandan President Juvénal Habyarimana. The aircraft was shot down by unknown assailants over Kigali, killing all aboard. The shootdown triggered the Rwandan genocide. Following the crash, Ntibantunganya made a broadcast on Burundi television, flanked by the minister of defence and the army chief of staff, appealing for calm. He attributed Ntaryamira's death to "the facts of circumstance" and believed that he was not the target of the assassination. In accordance with the constitution Ntibantunganya, as President of the National Assembly, became the interim President of Burundi. Prime Minister Anatole Kanyenkiko and his government officially resigned but stayed in power pending the confirmation of a new executive. Ntibantunganya and Kanyenkiko enjoyed a good working relationship.

[T]he president...is expected to be strong and authoritative. Sylvestre Ntibantunganya, however, was neither. He never directly sought the presidency...Within his own party he was accused of prolixity, hesitation, and indecisiveness. He lacked experience in either business or government, in making quick, firm decisions.

— United States Ambassador to Burundi Bob Krueger

Faced with the spillover of the Rwandan Civil War, Ntibantunganya's government pursued a strict policy of neutrality, denying officials of the former Habyarimana regime residency in Bujumbura and refusing to allow French troops to use Burundi as a staging area for Opération Turquoise. In May Ntibantunganya met with RPF leader Pasteur Bizimungu. The genocide created a refugee crisis; an estimated 300,000 Rwandans ultimately fled to Burundi, while approximately 180,000 Burundian exiles who had fled to Rwanda in October 1993 also returned. With international assistance, Ntibantunganya's government opened new refugee camps to house them.

Over the course of 1994 the political and security situation in Burundi continued to deteriorate. Moderates in both UPRONA and FRODEBU were marginalised as radicals gained increasing influence and ethnic violence permeated the countryside. By the middle of the year Ntibantunganya was the only original member of the FRODEBU central committee still actively engaged with the party and the civil political process, with the others having been killed or having fled into exile. The party fractured into at least three groups, with the smallest section supporting Ntibantunganya, though many felt his cooperation with and concessions to the army and the opposition amounted to a capitulation. Another faction became a rebel group, the Conseil National Pour la Défense de la Démocratie – Forces pour la Défense de la Démocratie (CNDD–FDD). His tenure as President of the National Assembly ended on 30 September 1994. In early February 1995 Ntibantunganya dismissed two UPRONA ministers after they failed to show up to a cabinet meeting. Later that month, UPRONA extremists—displeased with the coalition government—forced out Prime Minister Kanyenkiko and replaced him with Antoine Nduwayo. Nduwayo actively undermined the president's policies. In 1995 Ntibantunganya married his second wife, Pascasie Minani.

In the summer of 1995 the Burundian Army purchased heavy weapons from China. Fearful of the implications of their arrival, Ntibantunganya quietly persuaded the Tanzanian government to delay the shipment on its soil. Under pressure from UN and domestically, Ntibantunganya was forced to let the arms be delivered. At the behest of Tutsi extremists he also convinced the National Assembly to grant the army and gendarmerie emergency powers to restrict freedom of movement and speech.

With the civil war worsening and ethnic violence increasing, on 25 June 1996 Ntibantunganya participated in regional security talks in Mwanza, Tanzania. As a consequence of the meeting, the president and Nduwayo both agreed to appeal for "international military assistance". The Burundian Army feared this would mean its usurpation by foreign intervention, and UPRONA immediately denounced the proposal. Nduwayo then accused Ntibantunganya of subverting the military, and joined the thousands of others in the capital in marching against an intervention. On 20 July 300 Tutsis at a displaced persons camp were massacred, presumably by Hutu rebels. When Ntibantunganya attempted to attend a funeral for them three days later the crowd of mourners attacked him with stones, forcing him to evacuate via helicopter. Ntibantunganya then obtained intelligence which suggested his life was threatened. He refused to resign but asked for refuge at the United States Ambassador's residence, which was granted. On 25 July he went to the residence, while Nduwayo announced his government's resignation. Major Pierre Buyoya subsequently took power in a military coup. He announced the suspension of the constitution, the dissolution of the National Assembly, and the banning of political parties, but declared that he would guarantee Ntibantunganya's safety. Ntibantunganya later entered negotiations with Buyoya, who agreed to provide him with a home in the Bujumbura suburb of Kiriri. He left the United States Embassy on 8 June 1997, saying, "I reaffirm that I shall not yield on the principle for a search for a negotiated solution for all problems that face our country."

== Later life ==
Ntibantunganya served as a senator for life as a former head of state from the implementation of the Arusha Accords until August 2018. On 14 June 2007 his membership in FRODEBU was suspended. He was a candidate in the 2015 Burundian presidential election. In July he and several other opposition candidates dropped out of the race, citing concerns for their safety and fear that incumbent President Pierre Nkurunziza would rig the outcome in his favor. The following year he spent several months in exile in Belgium. In 2020 he led the East African Community's election monitoring team for Tanzania's general elections.

In 1999 Ntibantunganya released his first book, Démocratie (une) pour tous les Burundais, published by L'Harmattan. He spent 14 years writing another book, Burundi, Démocratie piégée, which he published in 2019. During the celebration of International book day on 23 April 2021 he lamented that Burundians "do not read" and called for the national promotion of literature.

== Works cited ==
- Banshimiyubusa, Denis (2018). Les enjeux et défis de la démocratisation au Burundi. Essai d'analyse et d'interprétation à partir des partis politiques [The issues and challenges of democratization in Burundi. Essay of analysis and interpretation from political parties] (PDF) (PhD thesis) (in French). Université Pau et des Pays de l'Adour. OCLC 1085890695.
- Chretien, Jean-Pierre; Mukuri, Melchior (2002). Burundi, la fracture identitaire: logiques de violence et certitudes ethniques, 1993-1996 (in French). Karthala Editions. ISBN 9782845863187.
- "Keesing's Record of World Events". Keesing's World News Archive. 40. Longman. 1994. ISSN 0950-6128.
- Krueger, Robert; Krueger, Kathleen Tobin (2007). From Bloodshed to Hope in Burundi : Our Embassy Years During Genocide (PDF). University of Texas Press. ISBN 9780292714861.
- Reyntjens, Filip (2009). The Great African War: Congo and Regional Geopolitics, 1996-2006 (reprint ed.). Cambridge University Press. ISBN 9780521111287.
- Watt, Nigel (2008). Burundi : Biography of a Small African County. New York: Columbia University Press. ISBN 978-0-231-70090-0.
- Whitaker's Almanack : 1994 (126th ed.). London: J. Whitaker & Sons. 1993. ISBN 9780850212389.

Political offices
Preceded by Cyprien Ntaryamira	President of Burundi; 1994–1996	Succeeded by Pierre Buyoya
