= André Guichaoua =

André Guichaoua is a French sociologist and former expert witness for the International Criminal Tribunal for Rwanda. He has been described by Scott Straus as "a leading scholar of Rwanda and the Habyarimana period".

== Works ==
- Guichaoua, André, ed. (1995). Les crises politiques au Burundi et au Rwanda, 1993-1994: analyses, faits et documents (in French). Université des sciences et technologies de Lille, Faculté des sciences économiques et sociales. ISBN 978-2-86537-554-7.
- Guichaoua, André (2005). Rwanda 1994. Les politiques du génocide à Butare (in French). KARTHALA Editions. ISBN 978-2-8111-3979-7.
- Guichaoua, André (2015). From War to Genocide: Criminal Politics in Rwanda, 1990–1994. University of Wisconsin Press. ISBN 978-0-299-29820-3.
