= 1993 ethnic violence in Burundi =

1993 killings of mostly Tutsis in Burundi

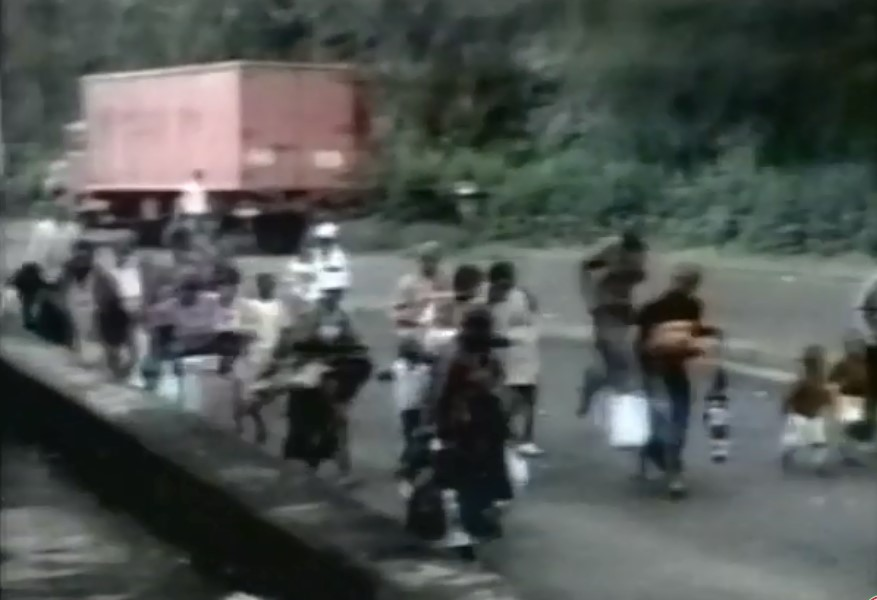
Burundians fleeing during the 1993 violence

Mass killings of Tutsis were conducted by the majority-Hutu populace in Burundi from 21 October to December 1993, under an eruption of ethnic animosity and riots following the assassination of Burundian President Melchior Ndadaye in an attempted coup d'état. The massacres took place in all provinces apart from Makamba and Bururi, and were primarily undertaken by Hutu peasants. At many points throughout, Tutsis took vengeance and initiated massacres in response.

The United Nations Population Fund and the Government of Burundi conducted a study in 2002 which concluded that a total of 116,059 people died during the events. The question of whether the killings of Tutsis arose from a planned genocide or from spontaneous violence remains heavily disputed among academics and Burundians who lived through the events.

== Background ==
From the mid-1960s, the country of Burundi was politically dominated by its Tutsi ethnic minority at the expense of the Hutu majority. Union pour le Progrès National (UPRONA), which served as the legal ruling party from 1966, was overwhelmingly made up of Tutsis. Military officers dominated the presidency, coming to power through coups. During this time there were instances of ethnic repression, particularly in 1972 when the Burundian military quashed a Hutu rebellion and then murdered thousands of civilians.

In 1987, Pierre Buyoya became President of Burundi following a coup. He initially ignored the country's ethnic strife and perpetuated Tutsi domination of public life. In August 1988, violence broke out and the army massacred thousands of Hutus. Facing substantial foreign pressure, Buyoya initiated reforms designed to end Burundi's systemic ethnic violence, while UPRONA attempted to incorporate more Hutus into its ranks. The Tutsi establishment in the army and security forces nevertheless resisted change. A commission appointed by the president produced a constitution which provided for democratic elections. The document was adopted via referendum in March 1992, followed shortly thereafter by the creation of new political parties. Buyoya scheduled free elections in 1993 and offered himself as UPRONA's presidential candidate. UPRONA's main challenger became Front pour la Démocratie au Burundi (FRODEBU), a party largely associated with Hutus. In the 1 June presidential election, Buyoya faced Melchior Ndadaye, who was backed by FRODEBU. Ndadaye won the election in a landslide, earning 64 percent of the popular vote. In the subsequent parliamentary elections on 29 June, FRODEBU won 71.4 percent of the vote and earned 80 percent of the seats in the National Assembly. The party also took over most local administration.

== Prelude ==
Rumours circulated in Burundi that the army would attempt to intervene to disrupt the transition. A plot from a handful of officers discovered on 3 July to seize Ndadaye's residence failed due to a lack of support from other components of the military, resulting in several arrests. Ndadaye was sworn-in as President on 10 July. He assembled a government of 23 ministers, including 13 FRODEBU and six UPRONA members. Nine of the ministers were Tutsi, including Prime Minister Sylvie Kinigi, a member of UPRONA.

Ndadaye's tenure was largely peaceful, but during his time in office Burundi was subject to several social and political disruptions. Among the former, the media—recently liberalised—often used its freedom to discuss public issues in an inflammatory manner. Thousands of Burundian Hutu refugees who had fled during the violence of 1972 began returning en masse and demanding the reclamation of their property. Though Ndadaye suggested resettling them in vacant lands, many local officials made room for them by evicting others from their homes. Politically, Ndadaye's government reexamined several contracts and economic concessions made the by the previous regime, posing a threat to Tutsi elite business interests. Military reforms also led to the separation of the gendarmerie's command from the army, the replacement of the chiefs of staff of the army and gendarmerie, and new requirements for enrollment into the army were introduced. The army was due to open its annual recruitment drive in November, and there were fears among some Tutsi soldiers that this process would be altered in a way that would threaten their dominance of the institution.

At some point, a group of army personnel began planning a coup against Ndadaye's government. Their exact identity remains disputed.

== Massacres ==
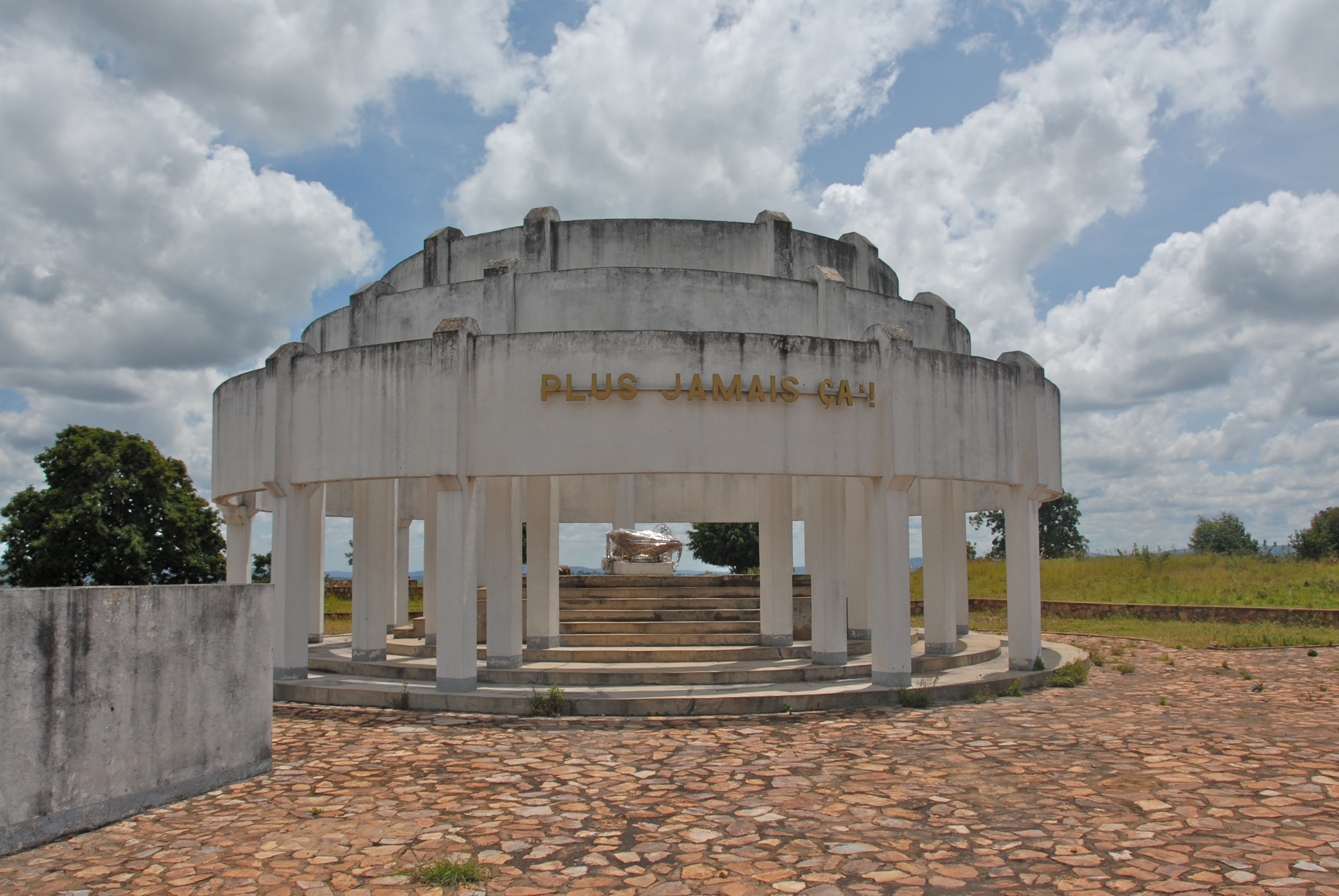
Modern-day view of the Kibimba School Memorial which commemorates the massacre of 75 Tutsi schoolchildren in October 1993

Tensions climaxed on 21 October 1993 when President Ndadaye was assassinated during a coup attempt, and the country descended into a period of civil strife. The Rwanda-based Radio Télévision Libre des Mille Collines (RTLM) reported that a coup had taken place and that Ndadaye had been captured on 21 October. This led young FRODEBU members to arm themselves and take Tutsis and Hutu UPRONA members hostage. Once RTLM announced Ndadaye's death later that day, the hostages were executed.

By 22 October, Hutus were attacking Tutsis in the provinces of Kirundo, Ngozi, Gitega, Muyinga, Ruyigi, and Karuzi, and in parts of Kayanza, Muramvya, Rutana, and Bujumbura Rural. Violence was less intensive in the Cibitoke and Bubanza Provinces in the northwest and Cankuzo Province in the east. Only the provinces of Makamba and Bururi completely avoided the violence. Hutu peasants were primarily involved, though in some instances FRODEBU members in provincial and communal governments engaged in anti-Tutsi violence. In Butzei, one FRODEBU administrator was reported to have arranged for over three dozen Tutsi civil servants to be burnt.

In several instances, Tutsis engaged in reprisals. The retaliatory violence was particularly acute in the provinces of Karuzi, Gitega, and Ruyigi. On 24 October in Ruyigi town, Tutsis murdered 78 Hutu civil servants who were seeking refuge at a bishop's compound. The Tutsi-dominated army also engaged in reprisal killings. One of the few exceptions to this was in Karuzi Province, where the local commander, Major Martin Nkurikiye, went unarmed with two FRODEBU parliamentarians into villages to try to convince armed Hutus to stand down. The army protected Tutsis by resettling them in fortified villages. Minister of Health Jean Minani—who was in Rwanda at the time—accused the army of committing genocide. In November, the Permanent Francophone Council condemned the killings.

Initial estimates of the death toll from the ethnic violence ranged from 25,000 to 500,000. A joint study conducted by the United Nations Population Fund and the Burundian government in 2002 estimated the number of people killed from 21 October to 31 December 1993 to be 116,059, with at least 100,000 deaths occurring in late October. It remains unclear what proportion of these victims were Tutsi and what proportion were Hutu.

== Aftermath ==
In 1997, the Burundian government passed a law which penalised genocide and crimes against humanity. Later that year, the government charged hundreds of persons accused of responsibility in the killings of Tutsis, with 44 being sentenced to death.

In 2014, the Truth and Reconciliation Commission (TRC) was established to investigate crimes committed during ethnic violence since independence in 1962.

== Assessment of the violence as genocide ==
In May 1994, a UN preliminary fact-finding commission determined that the massacres of Tutsis were not part of "any premeditated plan for the extermination of the Tutsi ethnic group by the Hutu". Conversely, the following year the International Commission of Inquiry for Burundi concluded that the killings constituted "an effort to completely destroy the Tutsi ethnic group. Tutsis were not simply killed in a spurt of violence, but systematically hunted...evidence is sufficient to establish that acts of genocide against the Tutsi minority took place in Burundi on 21 October 1993, and the days following". The commission noted that "the evidence is insufficient to determine whether or not these acts of genocide were planned or ordered by leaders at a higher level". FRODEBU accused the commission of bias and capitulating to demands of Tutsi politicians, church figures, and journalists to have their ethnic group's losses labeled genocide.

The question of whether the killings of Tutsis arose from a planned genocide or from spontaneous violence remains heavily disputed among academics and Burundians who lived through the events. Burundian Tutsi authors maintain that the killings were premeditated. Political scientist Filip Reyntjens wrote in 1995 that "there is no evidence that a genocidal plan ever existed, and the allegations that it did were part of a strategy to exonerate the army and to implicate FRODEBU." Academic Nigel Watt considered the violence to be a "double genocide", with the first one being perpetrated by Hutus against Tutsis, and the second being by the army against Hutus. He also wrote that there was no evidence that plans to kill Tutsis were formulated on a national scale but that "the speed of the mobilisation suggests that some people feared [a coup] might happen and made preparations."

== Legacy ==
The killings have received little coverage in international media or academia. Des Forges wrote that, "The lack of international response to the killing in Burundi led to the cataclysm in Rwanda". Burundian Tutsis attach more significance to the 1993 massacres relative to the 1972 Ikiza, which Hutus emphasise. Some Burundians perceive both events as genocides worthy of remembrance, but generally factions have formed to claim the precedence of one event over the other and commemorate them accordingly. Radical Tutsi ideologues, while stressing that the 1993 events were a genocide targeting Tutsis, often neglect to mention the thousands of Hutus killed by the army during the same period and the flight of thousands more as refugees to Rwanda. Tutsi academics tend to give Ndadaye's assassination only cursory attention in their histories of the violence. In contrast, Hutu writers usually emphasise the killing of Ndadaye and the massacres of Hutus inflicted by the army and ignore the killings of Tutsis. The Tutsi extremist group AC Genocide-Crimoso later established several monuments to commemorate Tutsis killed in 1993. The Burundian government erected a monument in 2010 to commemorate victims of all post-colonial violence in the country.

== See also ==
- Ikiza
- Rwandan genocide
- Burundian Civil War
- Small Country, a novel that takes place in Burundi during the 1993 ethnic conflicts

== Works cited ==
- Amnesty International Report 1994. London: Amnesty International Publications. 1994. ISBN 978-0-86210-230-2.
- Bentrovato, Denise (2019). "Burundi". The Palgrave Handbook of Conflict and History Education in the Post-Cold War Era. Cham: Palgrave Macmillan. ISBN 9783030057213.
- Bundervoet, Tom (May 2009). "Livestock, Land and Political Power: The 1993 Killings in Burundi". Journal of Peace Research. 46 (3): 357–376. doi:10.1177/0022343309102657. S2CID 58245595.
- Daley, Patricia O. (2008). Gender & Genocide in Burundi : The Search for Spaces of Peace in the Great Lakes Region. African Issues. Bloomington: Indiana University Press. ISBN 978-0-253-35171-5.
- International Commission of Inquiry for Burundi: Final Report (S/1996/682), New York: United Nations International Commission of Inquiry for Burundi, 1996
- Lemarchand, René (1996). Burundi: Ethnic Conflict and Genocide, Cambridge University Press, ISBN 0-521-56623-1
- Klinghoffer, A. (1998). The International Dimension of Genocide in Rwanda. Springer. ISBN 9780230375062.
- Lemarchand, René (2009). The Dynamics of Violence in Central Africa. University of Pennsylvania Press. ISBN 9780812241204.
- Manirakiza, Désiré (2011). "Les intellectuels burundais face au piège de l'ethnisme" [Burundian intellectuals face the trap of ethnicism]. Revue Africaine de Sociologie (in French). 15 (1): 20–47. JSTOR 24487939.
- Reyntjens, Filip (December 1993). "The Proof of the Pudding is in the Eating: The June 1993 Elections in Burundi". The Journal of Modern African Studies. 31 (4): 563–583. doi:10.1017/S0022278X00012246. JSTOR 161291. S2CID 154612240.
- Schweiger, Romana (July 2006). "Late Justice For Burundi". The International and Comparative Law Quarterly. 55 (3): 653–670. doi:10.1093/iclq/lei109. JSTOR 4092644.
- Sebudandi, Gaëtan; Richard, Pierre-Olivier (1996). Le drame burundais: hantise du pouvoir ou tentation suicidaire [The Burundian tragedy: obsession with power or suicidal temptation] (in French). Karthala Editions. ISBN 9782865376476.
- Turner, Simon (2012). Politics of Innocence: Hutu Identity, Conflict and Camp Life. Berghahn Books. ISBN 9780857456090.
- Uvin, Peter (2013). Life after Violence: A People's Story of Burundi. Zed Books. ISBN 9781848137240.
- Watt, Nigel (2008). Burundi: Biography of a Small African Country. Hurst & Company. ISBN 9781850659174.
