= Jean-Marie Ngendahayo =

Burundian politician (born 1956)

Jean‐Marie Ngendahayo (born 1956) is a Burundian politician.

== Early life and education ==
Jean‐Marie Ngendahayo was born in 1956 in Cibitoke Province, Ruanda-Urundi. Ethnically, he is Ganwa, though this category has been subsumed into the Tutsi ethnic group. He attended primary school from 1961 to 1969 and thereafter attended the Holy Spirit Lycée until 1976. That year he enrolled at the University of Burundi, and he graduated from the institution in 1981 with a degree in Roman philology. He later married, having two daughters from his first marriage and a son from his second marriage.

Ngendahayo initially worked as a teacher, but eventually took up a position with the European Economic Community. He then worked for the United Nations Children's Fund's Burundi office and the United Nations Population Fund.

== Political career ==
In the early 1990s Burundi underwent a democratic transition and returned to multi-party politics. In February 1991 Ngendahayo became one of the twelve founding members of the Iteka League, a human rights association. He joined Melchior Ndadaye's political party, the Front for Democracy in Burundi (FRODEBU). In Burundi's legislative elections held in June 1993, Ngendahayo was elected to a seat in the National Assembly representing Cibitoke. He became Minister of Communications in Prime Minister Sylvie Kinigi's government on 10 July. In this capacity he suspended a newspaper's publication for attacking the president, but the Commission on Press Freedom overturned his decision.

Later in 1993 Ngendahayo was appointed Minister of Foreign Affairs. In June 1995 he and United States Ambassador Bob Krueger were ambushed by rebels while traveling in a convoy in the countryside. The two escaped and were flown by helicopter back to the capital. He resigned from his post on 25 June and fled to Johannesburg, South Africa, saying that the government was unable to provide for the safety of Burundian citizens. He came back to Burundi in 2002.

In the 2005 Burundian legislative election Ngendahayo won a seat in the National Assembly on a National Council for the Defense of Democracy – Forces for the Defense of Democracy (CNDD-FDD) ticket. He subsequently rose to become chairman of the Parliamentary Committee on Foreign Affairs. In May he was appointed Minister of Interior. In September 2007 he left the CNDD-FDD, citing his unhappiness with the government's actions, particularly concerning human rights.

== Later life ==
In 2008 Ngendahayo went into exile in the United States. He returned to Burundi two years later and began writing and teaching.

== Works cited ==
- Keesing's Record of World Events,. Vol. 39. Longman. 1993. ISSN 0950-6128.
- Krueger, Robert; Krueger, Kathleen Tobin (2007). From Bloodshed to Hope in Burundi : Our Embassy Years During Genocide. University of Texas Press. ISBN 9780292714861.
- Reyntjens, Filip (2009). The Great African War: Congo and Regional Geopolitics, 1996-2006 (reprint ed.). Cambridge University Press. ISBN 9780521111287.
