= Holy Spirit Lycée =

- French: Lycée du Saint-Esprit

Location
- Gihosha, Bujumbura; Burundi
- Coordinates: 3°21′51″S 29°23′32″E

Information
- Former name: Usumbura Interracial College (1952-1955)
- Type: Public secondary school
- Motto: Latin: Ad Majorem Dei Gloriam (For the Greater Glory of God)
- Religious affiliation: Catholicism
- Denomination: Jesuits
- Established: 1952; 74 years ago
- Rector: Félix Barutwanayo
- Faculty: 53
- Age range: 11 through 18
- Enrollment: 920
- Language: French-medium; Kirundi; Swahili; English
- Campus size: 6 hectares (15 acres)

Holy Spirit Lyceum (French: Lycée du Saint-Esprit) is a public Catholic secondary school located in Gihosha, Bujumbura, Burundi. The school was founded by the Rwanda Burundi Region of the Society of Jesus in 1952; and it covers ages 11 through 18 and has about 920 students. The Lycée is managed by the Society of Jesus. It has ranked first in the country's national exams.

== History ==
In 1952 the Jesuit College was located on Kiriri Hill in eastern Bujumbura, under the name Usumbura Interracial College. It was re-named after the Holy Spirit in 1955. The Burundian government took over the school in 1987 and moved it to Kamenge, a northern zone of Bujumbura. In 1990 it was returned to the Jesuits and took its present name. It remains in Kamenge but, following the redivision of the city into new administrative units, it was designated as being in the zone of Gihosha. It operates under the designation of public schools under Catholic management. Teaching is in French while languages taught include the native Kirundi as well as Swahili and English.

Past rectors include Guillaume Ndayishimiye (1990-2000 and 2011-2016), Ignace Samurenzi (2000-2001 and 2003-2011), Robert Albertijn (2001-2003 ) and Bernard Karerwa(2016- ).

== See also ==
- Education in Burundi
- List of Jesuit schools
