= Melchior Ndadaye =

President of Burundi

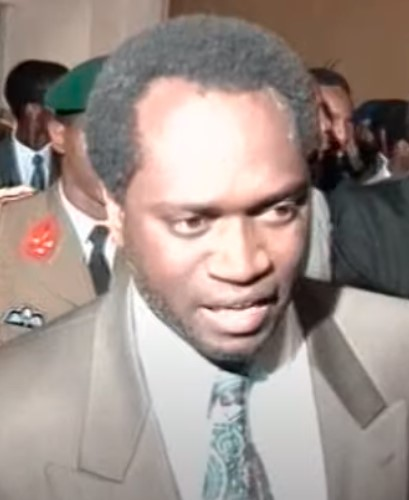
- President Ndadaye in 1993

4th President of Burundi
- In office 10 July 1993 – 21 October 1993
- Prime Minister: Sylvie Kinigi
- Preceded by: Pierre Buyoya
- Succeeded by: François Ngeze

Personal details
- Born: 28 March 1953 Nyabihanga, Ruanda-Urundi
- Died: 21 October 1993 (aged 40) Bujumbura, Burundi
- Cause of death: Assassination
- Resting place: Bujumbura
- Party: Front for Democracy in Burundi (FRODEBU); Burundi Workers' Party (UBU)
- Spouse: Laurence Ndadaye
- Education: National University of Rwanda; Conservatoire national des arts et métiers
- Occupation: Politician, banker

Melchior Ndadaye (28 March 1953 – 21 October 1993) was a Burundian banker and politician who became the first democratically elected and first Hutu president of Burundi after winning the landmark 1993 election. Though he attempted to smooth the country's bitter ethnic divide, his reforms antagonised soldiers in the Tutsi-dominated army, and he was assassinated amidst a failed military coup in October 1993, after only three months in office. His assassination sparked an array of brutal tit-for-tat massacres between the Tutsi and Hutu ethnic groups, and ultimately led to the decade-long Burundi Civil War.

== Early life ==
Melchior Ndadaye was born on 28 March 1953 in the commune of Nyabihanga, Ruanda-Urundi. The son of Pie Ndadaye and Thérèse Bandushubwenge, he was the first of ten children in a Hutu family. He attended primary school in Mbogora and in 1966 enrolled at the normal school in Gitega. Following the 1972 Ikiza, in which the government of Burundi targeted and massacred educated Hutus, he fled to Rwanda, fearing what would happen if he returned to school in Gitega. He enrolled at the Groupe Scolaire Officiel in Butare to complete his secondary studies, graduating in 1975. He then enrolled at the National University of Rwanda to take up pedagogical studies, earning a license degree in 1980. Ndadaye taught at the Lycée pédagogique in Save, southern Rwanda, from 1980 to 1983.

== Early political involvement and return to Burundi ==
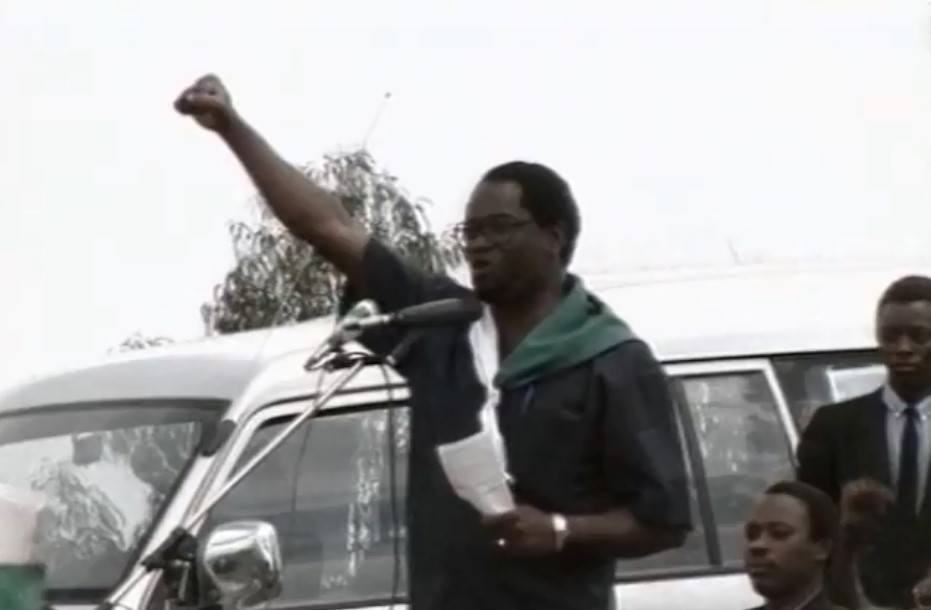
Ndadaye speaking at a FRODEBU rally following his electoral victory in 1993

Ndadaye became involved in politics while in Rwanda, and in 1976 founded the Mouvement des Étudiants Progressistes Barundi au Rwanda (BEMPERE), a progressive movement for exiled Burundian Hutu students. In August 1979 Ndadaye and other Burundian exiles founded the Burundi Workers' Party (Umugambwe wa'Bakozi Uburundi, UBU), a Marxist-Lenininist political party. He served as the party's secretary for information and editor-in-chief of its newspapers, Le Flambeau and Ukuri. From 1982 to 1983 ideological divisions arose in UBU, with one faction advocating armed revolution and another—led by Sylvestre Ntibantunganya and Ndadaye—advocating democracy and political freedom. Ndadaye published a document calling for an "alliance of Burundian progressive forces," further distancing himself from other members. As a result of the fracture, Ndadaye left UBU and returned to Burundi in 1983.

In July 1984 Ndadaye married Laurence Nininahazwe, with whom he had three children. From that year until 1986 he worked at the Centre Neuro-Psychiatrique Kamenge in Bujumbura. During this time he was a member of another political party, Front de Lutte pour la Démocratie (FROLUDE), but the group disbanded after fears grew that it had been infiltrated by the government and some of its members were arrested. From 1986 until 1988 Ndadaye directed the Coopératives d'Épargne et de Crédit in Gitega. In 1989 he returned to Bujumbura and became head of Meridian Bank Biao's credit service. He then took up study with the Institut Technique de Banque at the Conservatoire national des arts et métiers in Paris, securing a diploma in higher banking studies in 1992.

== Leader of FRODEBU ==
In June 1986 Ndadaye and other former UBU members, seeing the growing international preference for democracy and peaceful electoral processes, founded a new underground political movement, the Front for Democracy in Burundi (FRODEBU). He subsequently became the party's president. In 1988 he was named first secretary of the Gitega branch of the Union des Travailleurs du Burundi, a labor union affiliated with the ruling Union for National Progress (UPRONA) party. That year Burundi became beset by ethnic violence, and on 23 October he criticised the government of President Pierre Buyoya in a meeting called by the governor of Gitega Province. As a result, he was imprisoned for two months in Rumonge. In February 1991 Ndadaye became one of the twelve founding members of the Iteka League, a human rights association. In March Buyoya appointed a 35-member Constitution Commission to study the country's ethnic and political problems and draft a new basic law. Ndadaye was the sole member of the political opposition to serve on it. The body produced a 145-page report titled, "The Democratisation of Institutions and Political Life in Burundi." Ndadaye resigned in August, citing the commission's lack of diversity, and omissions and undemocratic provisions in the report. He was also dissatisfied with UPRONA's control over the political transition.

The 1991 constitution made provisions for multiparty politics, and on 25 May 1992 FRODEBU petitioned the Ministry of Interior for official recognition, which was granted on 23 July. Ndadaye remained critical of the transition, expressing anger at the government's domination by UPRONA members and accusing UPRONA activists of using state resources to support their activities. On 18 April 1993 a FRODEBU congress nominated Ndadaye as its candidate of choice for the upcoming presidential election. Viewed as a liberator of Burundi's Hutus, he also obtained the support of a coalition of minor Hutu-dominated opposition parties, the Forces pour le Changement Démocratique (FCD). Ntibantunganya, another founding FRODEBU member, said that Ndadaye further benefitted from a public perception that he was a "political virgin". Advocating change, Ndadaye and his allies made frequent use of the phrase "new Burundi" (Kirundi: uburundi bushasha). He put forward a platform titled, "Our proposals to build a new Burundi", comprising 46 specific measures involving political, economic, and socio-cultural issues. He advocated disbanding the Tutsi-dominated armed forces and recreating the army and gendarmerie based on equitable recruitment from each colline, thus ensuring more ethnically balanced forces. FRODEBU's opponents denounced the party as a Hutu extremist organization and attempted to tie it to the Parti pour la libération du peuple Hutu (PALIPEHUTU), a rebel group. Ndadaye decried this characterisation, and instead accused UPRONA's leadership of attempting to sow ethnic division.

Ndadaye, endorsed by FRODEBU and the FCD, competed against UPRONA's candidate, Buyoya, and Pierre Claver Sendegeya of the Parti pour la Réconciliation du Peuple. In the 1 June presidential election, Ndadaye won 64.86 percent of the vote, whereas Buyoya only garnered 33.20 percent and Sendegeya got 1.26 percent. The poll was certified by international observers as being free and fair, and none of the candidates contested the results. UPRONA members were stunned by Ndadaye's landslide victory. According to Buyoya, some party members asked him to falsify the returns to show a victory for himself, but he refused, feeling it would compromise his integrity and risk civil war. Foreign observers were also surprised by Buyoya's loss, but were generally satisfied that a civilian would assume power and that democratic processes were being followed. In the subsequent parliamentary elections on 29 June, FRODEBU won 71.4 percent of the vote and earned 80 percent of the seats in the National Assembly.

Rumours circulated in Burundi that the army would attempt to intervene to disrupt the transition. Ndadaye reassured a supporter that "They can kill Ndadaye, but they can't kill all 5 million Ndadayes." A plot from a handful of officers discovered on 3 July to seize Ndadaye's residence failed due to a lack of support from other components of the military, resulting in several arrests, including that of its suspected leader, Lieutenant Colonel Slyvestre Ningaba, who had been chef de cabinet for Buyoya. Buyoya and army leaders condemned the coup attempt. (Note: American diplomat Bob Krueger wrote that Commandant Hilaire Ntakiyica told him that the coup had been planned by Buyoya. It reportedly failed after the French ambassador and apostolic nuncio, having learned of the plot, warned Buyoya that the international community would not accept a coup, and thus the president intervened and ordered the army not to act.) When Ndadaye called Buyoya to ask him about the coup, Buyoya joked with him that it was a "kind of baptism of fire".

== Presidency ==
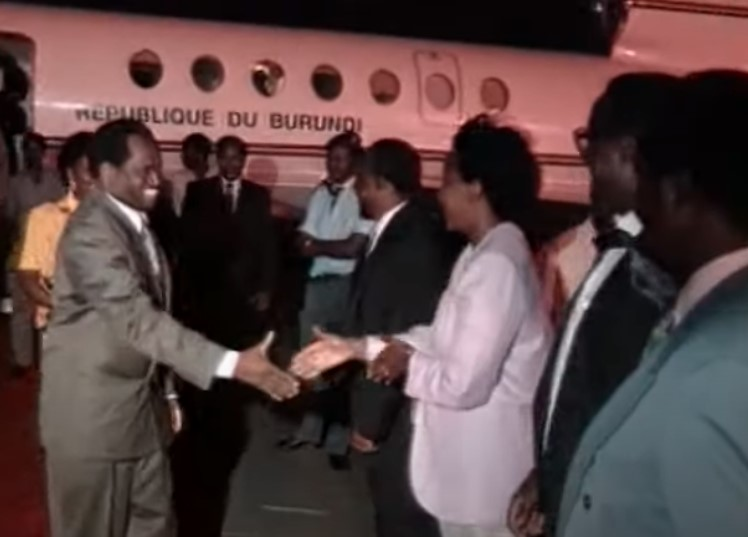
Ndadaye greeting Prime Minister Sylvie Kinigi at Bujumbura airport, 1993

Ndadaye was sworn in as President of Burundi on 10 July 1993. He became both the first democratically elected head of state and first Hutu president of Burundi. In his inaugural address he promised to create a "new Burundi". He assembled a government of 23 ministers, including 13 FRODEBU and six UPRONA members. Nine of the ministers were Tutsi, including Prime Minister Sylvie Kinigi, a member of UPRONA. He also appointed a Council of National Unity comprising 15 Hutus and 15 Tutsis who were to advise him on ethnic concerns.

Despite his cautious approach to the presidency, some of his actions nevertheless provoked tensions in the community. He questioned contracts and concessions approved under previous Tutsi governments, which threatened the economics of the powerful Tutsi elite and army. He began reforms to the military, shifting the national police to a separate command and changing the admission requirements for the military and police so as to reduce the entrenched Tutsi dominance. The dominance of FRODEBU caused problems at a local level, as Ndadaye's Hutu supporters took over many positions previously held by Tutsis in the public service, and botched the resettlement of refugees returning after the 1972 massacres in such a way as to leave many Tutsi families homeless. The issues were exacerbated by the newly-free press, who began reporting in such a way as to inflame ethnic tensions. He appointed Lieutenant Colonel Jean Bikomagu as Army Chief of Staff.

Internationally, Ndadaye attended the signing of the Arusha Accords—a peace agreement designed to end the Rwandan Civil War—on 4 August. His relationship with Rwandan President Juvénal Habyarimana was tenuous. In September he went to the United Nations headquarters and addressed the General Assembly. On 18 October he attended a summit of Francophone countries in Mauritius.

== Assassination and legacy ==
=== Prelude ===
On 19 October 1993, an army officer approached the wife of Minister of Communications Jean‐Marie Ngendahayo and informed her that personnel in the army headquarters were plotting against the president. At 15:00 on 20 October, Major Isaïe Nibizi, the officer responsible for presidential security, informed Ndadaye's chef de cabinet of suspicious military movements. Later that afternoon, Ndadaye hosted a cabinet meeting in Bujumbura to mark the first 100 days of his presidency (which had passed two days prior) and discuss what his government had accomplished in comparison to its campaign promises. At the conclusion of the meeting Ngendahayo requested to speak in private with Ndadaye. In the president's office, Ngendahayo raised concerns about Ndadaye's safety. Instead of informing the president about the vague threat his wife had learned of, he told him that he felt it strange that UPRONA, the Tutsi-dominated opposition party, was denouncing the government's popular policy of allowing thousands of Burundian refugees to return to the country before the commune elections in December. Ngendahayo stated that he thought this would cost UPRONA the elections, and thus the only reason they would oppose the policy is if they planned to take power via an assassination and a coup. He also requested that Ndadaye further consider a previous report declaring his personal security to be inadequate. Ndadaye instructed Ngendahayo to bring him the Minister of Defence, Colonel Charles Ntakije.

Ntakije told Ndadaye that a coup was being planned by the 11th Armoured Car Battalion, which was going to attack the Presidential Palace at 02:00 on 21 October. When asked how he would respond, Ntakije said he would gather trusted officers and organise an ambush if the battalion left its camp. Ndadye inquired about the status of Sylvestre Ningaba, a former army colonel who had been arrested in July for attempting a coup, and asked if he could be relocated to a different prison so the putschists could not obtain his help. Ntakije said that this would not be possible due to the objections of prison officials to transferring detainees at nighttime, but he assured the president that he would station an additional armoured car at the Presidential Palace for extra security. Ndadaye spoke about training possibilities for the Presidential Guard before dismissing both ministers for the evening and going to the palace. When he arrived he told his wife, Laurence, about the coup plot, but was mostly assured by what Ntakije had said to him. Writing on Ndadaye's willingness to return to the palace despite the threat, journalists Gaëtan Sebudandi and Pierre-Olivier Richard asserted that the president was probably convinced that the coup would be easily foiled, just like the plot on 3 July. Krueger wrote, "That a president as intelligent as Ndadaye's associates found him to be would so readily accept such scant preparations for his protection seems, in retrospect, remarkable to an outsider...However, in a capital perpetually nervous with rumour, it becomes exhausting to take seriously every reported threat. Moreover, Ndadaye may have had a kind of che sarà, sarà, fatalistic attitude that could come to a person who, having overcome numerous life threatening challenges, was unwilling to run away from the position and responsibilities he had so recently assumed."

=== Attack on the Presidential Palace ===
At around midnight on 20 October, putschists of the 11th Armoured Car Battalion departed from Camp Muha in over a dozen armoured cars and took up positions around Bujumbura. Within an hour they surrounded the Presidential Palace. They were joined by hundreds of soldiers and gendarmes from the other eleven military camps in Bujumbura, including members of the 1st Parachute Battalion and a few personnel from the 2nd Commando Battalion. They prepared to attack the palace, which was only guarded by 38 soldiers of the Presidential Guard and two armoured cars. Shortly before 01:00 on 21 October, Ntakije called the president and told him that armoured cars had left Camp Muha for an unknown destination and advised him to leave the palace immediately. Ndadaye then attempted to reach Captain Ildephonse Mushwabure, the commander of the palace guard, by phone, but when he did not answer he went into the palace gardens. At 01:30 the putschists fired a single shot, and shortly thereafter at least one armoured car blasted a hole in the grounds wall and began bombarding the palace with cannon fire. Laurence Ndadaye took her three children into an interior room and sheltered them under tables, while the president was disguised in a military uniform by his guards and placed in one of their armoured cars in the garden, where he remained for the next six hours.

=== Death ===
At about 7:30, Laurence Ndadaye and her children left the palace and reached one of the two cars on the grounds, which would not start. They quickly reunited with President Ndadaye, who was in the other armoured vehicle. The family considered scaling the perimeter wall to go to the neighbouring Meridian Hotel, but found that the palace was completely surrounded by putschists. At Captain Mushwabure's direction, Ndadaye decided to be taken with his family to Camp Muha. At 7:30 they left in their armoured car, and were trailed by the putschists' vehicles. Upon arriving at the base at 8:00, their car was surrounded by putschists of the 1st Battalion. Ndadaye was taken by Army Chief of Staff Bikomagu to a meeting with other senior officers of the army. About an hour later he returned with Secretary of State for Security Colonel Lazare Gakoryo, having reached a verbal agreement with the officers. Ndadaye reentered the armoured car with Gakoryo to finalise their understanding on paper, but when the secretary of state exited the vehicle soldiers began shouting for the president to come out. Once he did, Bikomagu quieted the crowd and Ndadaye appealed to the soldiers to negotiate peacefully with him.

Soldiers began closing in on the president, and Bikomagu instructed them to let his family go since they were "of no interest" to them. He directed a driver to take the family away, and at Laurence's direction, the soldier brought them to the French embassy, where they were allowed to take refuge. Bikomagu then pointed at President Ndadaye and said to the putschists, "He is the one you were looking for. Here he is. Do what you want with him." They placed Ndadaye in a jeep and drove him to the 1st Parachute Battalion's camp nearby, closely followed by Bikomagu, Gakoryo, and Major Nibizi. The president was taken to an office where ten junior officers—specifically assigned to the task—killed him. A coroner's report later found that Ndadaye was held by a cord around his neck while the soldiers bayoneted him 14 times. Half of the wounds penetrated his thorax and the subsequent bleeding filled up his lungs, killing him. The soldiers then dug a mass grave in the centre of the camp, where they buried Ndadaye, President of the National Assembly Pontien Karibwami, Vice President of the National Assembly Gilles Bimazubute, Minister of Home Affairs and Communal Development Juvénal Ndayikeza, and Director of Intelligence Richard Ndikumwami. After several hours the soldiers realised that international opinion would strongly disapprove of such treatment of the bodies, so they exhumed them and allowed family members to collect them. Ndadaye was reburied on 6 December in a ceremony in Bujumbura alongside other officials killed in the coup.

=== Aftermath ===
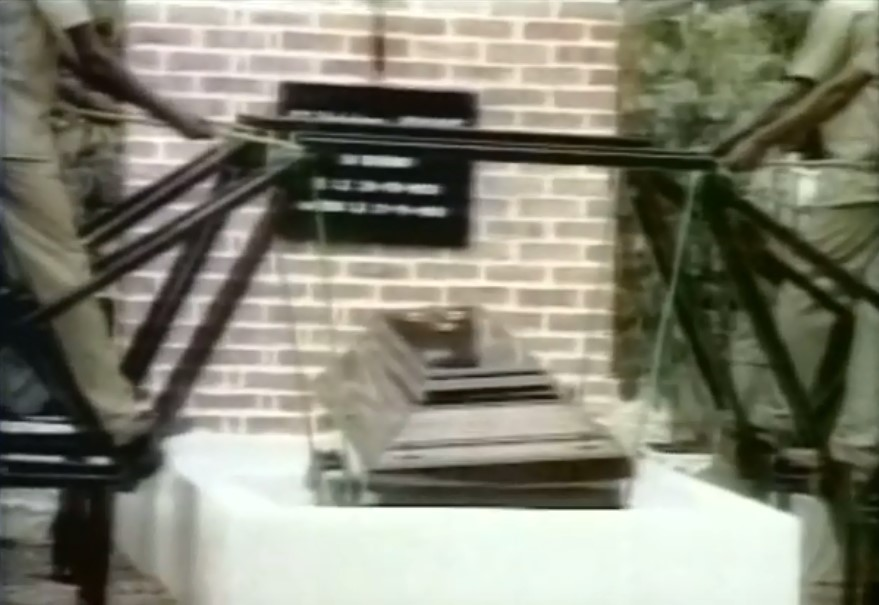
Ndadaye's casket lowered into his grave

Ndadaye's death sparked severe ramifications across the country. The attempted coup rapidly failed, as Francois Ngeze, the civilian politician installed as temporary head of state, refused to support the coup leaders and called for Prime Minister Kinigi, who had survived the coup and was in hiding at the French embassy to assume control, a move soon backed by key military chiefs. Kinigi was thus appointed as acting president while a resolution to the constitutional crisis caused by the assassination of both the president and the president of the assembly was found. The United Nations Security Council condemned the assassination and coup, and was soon followed in doing so by the United Nations General Assembly. Many thousands of civilians, on both sides, were killed in the resulting carnage, with estimates varying but generally agreed to be above 100,000. The ongoing violence developed into the decade-long Burundi Civil War.

A United Nations investigation into Ndadaye's murder, the result of which was released in 1996, accused the army command of being responsible for the assassination and of being complicit in the resulting massacres by Tutsi troops. It did not name specific figures as being responsible, but Buyoya, Ndadaye's predecessor as president, has long been suspected of having some role in the assassination.

In 1999, as part of attempts to end the civil war, an array of arrests were made of those suspected of involvement in the Ndadaye assassination. Five men, including the alleged ringleader, army officer Paul Kamana, were sentenced to death, and 74 others received sentences ranging from one year to twenty years. Most of the high-ranking officials charged, however, were acquitted, in a verdict condemned by Ndadaye's supporters.

In Burundi, Ndadaye has been posthumously remembered as a martyr for democracy and a national hero. Ndadaye Day is observed annually on 21 October to commemorate his death. The day is commemorated by the laying of a wreath on the tomb of Ndadaye. During President Pierre Nkurunziza's tenure as president, the government erected a monument jointly honouring Ndadaye and Louis Rwagasore at a roundabout in Bujumbura.

== Works cited ==
- Akyeampong, Emmanuel Kwaku; Gates, Henry Louis, eds. (2012). Dictionary of African Biography. Vol. 4. Oxford University Press USA. ISBN 9780195382075.
- Banshimiyubusa, Denis (2018). Les enjeux et défis de la démocratisation au Burundi. Essai d'analyse et d'interprétation à partir des partis politiques [The issues and challenges of democratization in Burundi. Essay of analysis and interpretation from political parties] (PDF) (PhD thesis) (in French). Université Pau et des Pays de l'Adour. OCLC 1085890695.
- "Burundi President Slain: Country Thrown Into Chaos". International Journal on World Peace. X (4): 37–38. December 1993. JSTOR 20751938.
- Des Forges, Alison (May 1994). "Burundi: Failed coup or creeping coup?". Current History. 93 (583): 203–207. doi:10.1525/curh.1994.93.583.203. ISSN 0011-3530. S2CID 249702870.
- Deslaurier, Christine (2013). "Rwagasore for ever? Des usages contemporains d'un héros consensuel au Burundi". Vingtième Siècle Revue d'histoire (in French). Vol. 2, no. 118. pp. 15–30.
- Falola, Toyin; Jean-Jacques, Daniel, eds. (2015). Africa: An Encyclopedia of Culture and Society. ABC-CLIO. ISBN 9781598846669.
- International Commission of Inquiry for Burundi: Final Report (S/1996/682), New York: United Nations International Commission of Inquiry for Burundi, 1996
- Krueger, Robert; Krueger, Kathleen Tobin (2007). From Bloodshed to Hope in Burundi : Our Embassy Years During Genocide (PDF). University of Texas Press. ISBN 9780292714861.
- Legum, Colin, ed. (1994). Africa Contemporary Record 1992–1994. Vol. XXIV. New York: Africana Publishing Company. ISBN 978-0841905627.
- Reyntjens, Filip (December 1993). "The Proof of the Pudding is in the Eating: The June 1993 Elections in Burundi". The Journal of Modern African Studies. 31 (4): 563–583. doi:10.1017/S0022278X00012246. JSTOR 161291. S2CID 154612240.
- Sebudandi, Gaëtan; Richard, Pierre-Olivier (1996). Le drame burundais: hantise du pouvoir ou tentation suicidaire (in French). Karthala Editions. ISBN 9782865376476.

Political offices
Preceded by Pierre Buyoya	President of Burundi; 1993	Succeeded by François Ngeze
