= Front for Democracy in Burundi =

Political party in Burundi

Front for Democracy in Burundi Front pour la Démocratie au Burundi
- Abbreviation: FRODEBU
- President: Léonce Ngendakumana
- Founders: Melchior Ndadaye; Cyprien Ntaryamira; Sylvestre Ntibantunganya
- Founded: 1986; 40 years ago
- Legalised: 1992; 34 years ago
- Preceded by: Burundi Workers' Party
- Ideology: Hutu interests Progressivism; Democratic socialism Social democracy Anti-ethnicism; African socialism
- Political position: Left-wing
- International affiliation: Socialist International
- Colors: Green, white
- Senate: 0 / 13
- National Assembly: 0 / 111

Party flag

The Front for Democracy in Burundi (French: Front pour la Démocratie au Burundi, FRODEBU) is a democratic socialist political party in Burundi. In Burundi's ethnically divided political landscape, the FRODEBU is officially a multi-ethnic organization, despite being dominated by the Hutu ethnic group.

== History ==
It was formed by followers of Melchior Ndadaye from the disbanded Burundi Workers' Party in 1986. FRODEBU was legalized as a political party in 1992.

In 1993, FRODEBU won power in Burundi and put forward a Hutu president, Melchior Ndadaye. The election of a Hutu government triggered violence between Hutu and Tutsi militias, and President Ndadaye was assassinated. In retaliation, some 25,000 Tutsis were killed. The Tutsis responded with an outbreak of violence against Hutus and killed civilians in retaliation. The violence was on a smaller scale than the mass genocide occurring in Rwanda where Hutu were massacring Tutsis and moderate Hutus.

By mid-1994, FRODEBU had been severely crippled by a loss of leadership; of its 11-strong central committee prior to the 1993 elections, by that point only Sylvestre Ntibantunganya remained active with the party in Burundi. Six of the committee members had been killed, while the remainder had fled into exile.

In the legislative 2005 parliamentary election, the party won 21.7% of the vote and 30 out of 118 seats, becoming the main opposition party.

FRODEBU suspended its participation in the National Assembly on 21 February 2008 to protest efforts by the National Council for the Defense of Democracy-Forces for the Defense of Democracy (CNDD/FDD) to remove Alice Nzomukunda, a former CNDD/FDD member, from her post as vice-president of the National Assembly.

FRODEBU is a consultative member of the Socialist International.

== Electoral history ==
=== Presidential elections ===
Election	Party candidate	Votes	%	Result
1993	Melchior Ndadaye	1,483,904	65.68%	Elected ✓
2010	Boycotted			

=== National Assembly elections ===
Election	Votes	%	Seats	+/–	Position
1993	1,532,106	72.58%	65 / 81	▲65	▲1st
2005	525,336	21.70%	30 / 118	▼35	▼2nd
2010	Boycotted				
2015	Boycotted				
2020	31,106	0.73%	0 / 123	Steady	▼4th

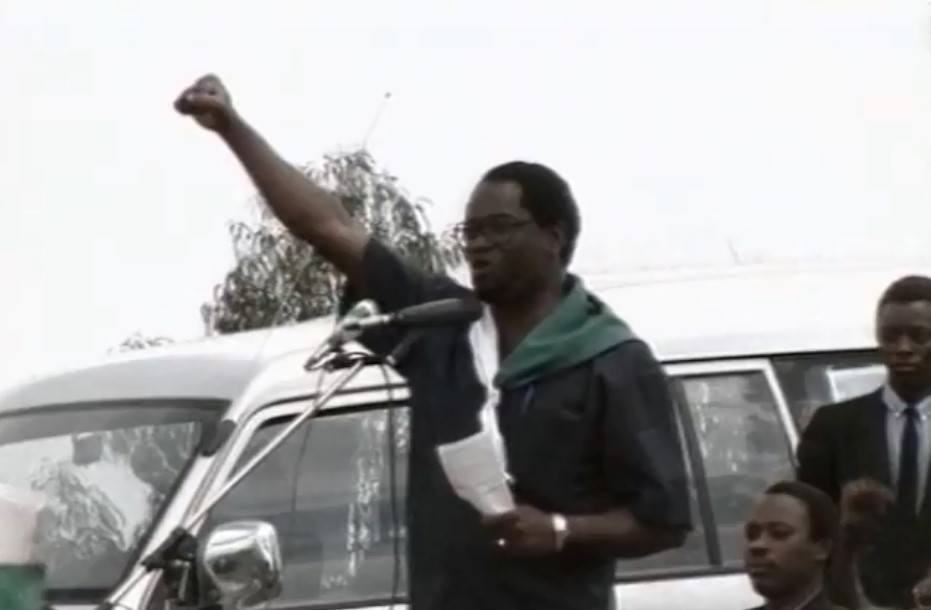
Ndadaye speaking at a FRODEBU rally following his electoral victory in 1993

=== Senate elections ===
Election	Seats	+/–	Position
2005	5 / 49	▲5	▲2nd
2010	Boycotted		
2015	Boycotted		
