= Assassination of Juvénal Habyarimana and Cyprien Ntaryamira =

1994 aircraft shootdown in Rwanda

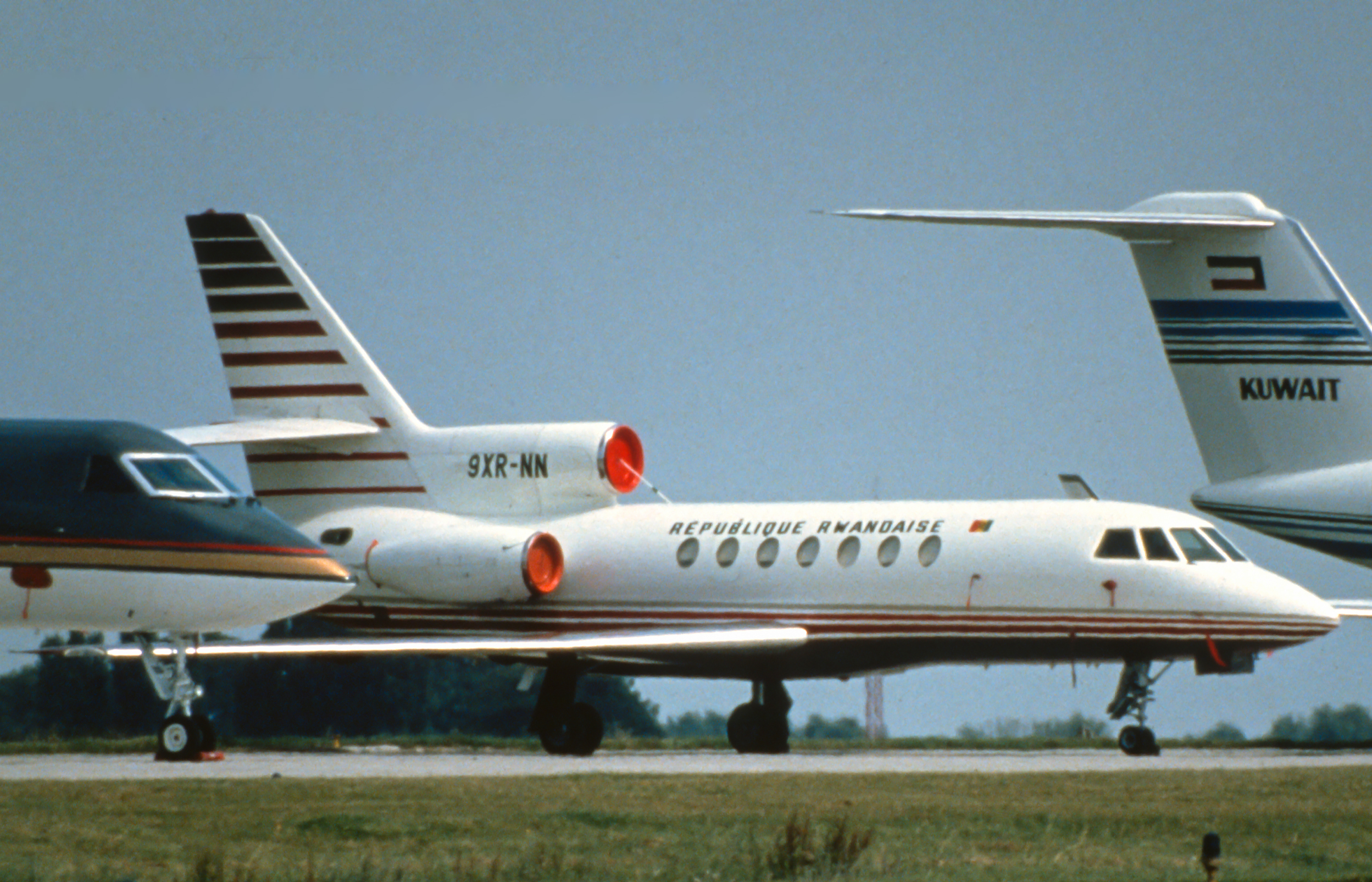
- 9XR-NN, the aircraft involved, seen in Brussels Airport in 1993

Shootdown
- Date: 6 April 1994
- Summary: Shot down by surface-to-air missiles
- Site: Presidential Palace gardens, near Kigali International Airport, Kigali, Rwanda; 1°58′32″S 30°10′26″E

Aircraft
- Aircraft type: Dassault Falcon 50
- Registration: 9XR-NN
- Flight origin: Dar es Salaam International Airport, Kipawa, Ilala, Tanzania
- Stopover: Kigali International Airport, Kigali, Rwanda
- Destination: Bujumbura International Airport, Bujumbura, Burundi
- Occupants: 12
- Passengers: 9
- Crew: 3
- Fatalities: 12
- Survivors: 0

On the evening of 6 April 1994, the aircraft carrying Rwandan president Juvénal Habyarimana and Burundian president Cyprien Ntaryamira, both Hutu, was shot down with surface-to-air missiles as their jet prepared to land in Kigali, Rwanda; both were killed. The assassination set in motion the Rwandan genocide, one of the bloodiest events of the late 20th century.

Responsibility for the attack is disputed. Most theories propose as suspects either the Tutsi rebel Rwandan Patriotic Front (RPF) or government-aligned Hutu Power followers opposed to negotiation with the RPF.

== Background ==
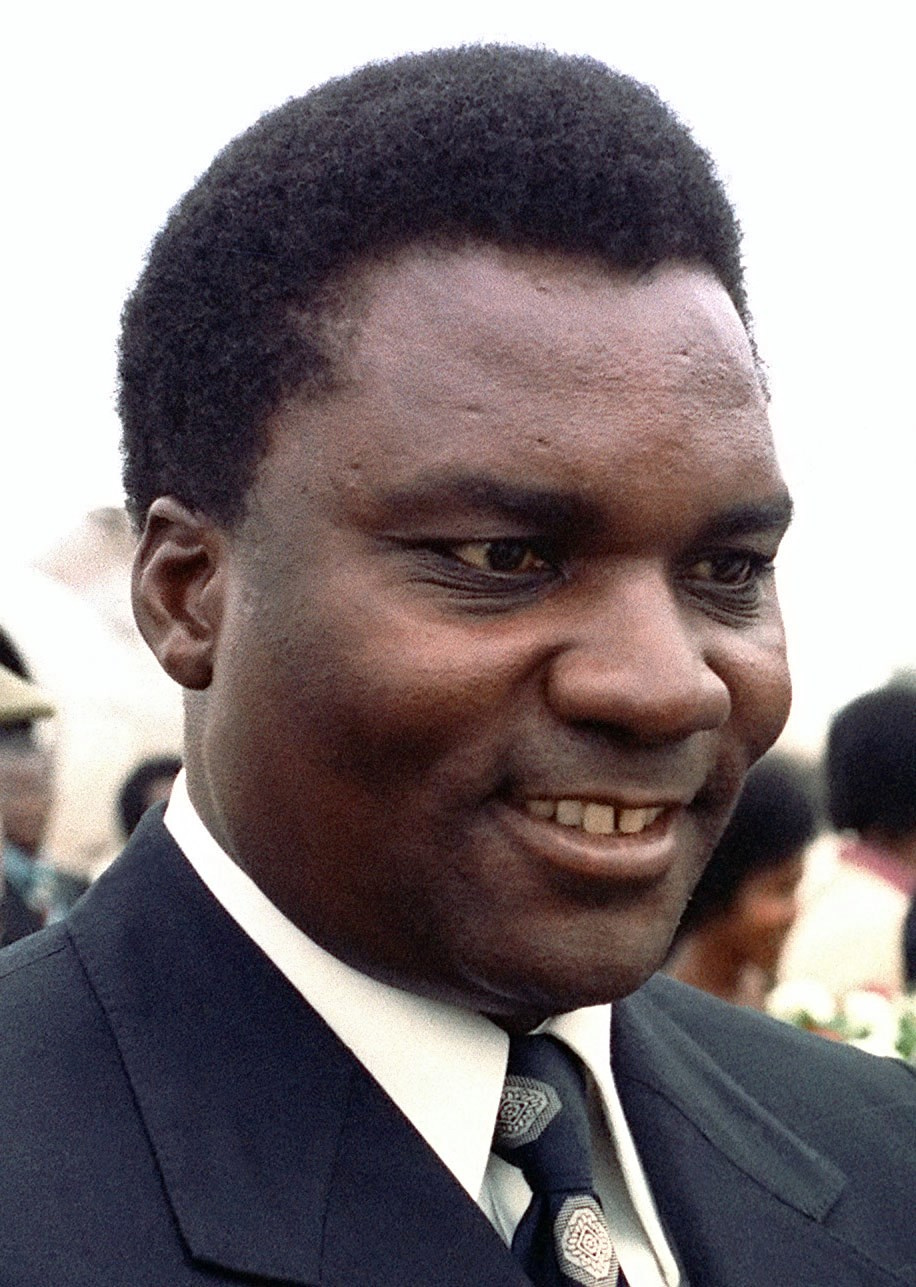
Rwandan President Juvénal Habyarimana in 1980

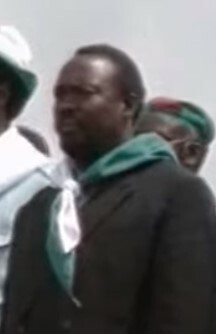
Burundian President Cyprien Ntaryamira in 1993

In 1990, the Rwandan Civil War began when the Rwandan Patriotic Front, dominated by the Tutsi ethnic group, invaded northern Rwanda from Uganda. Most of the RPF fighters were either refugees or the sons of refugees who had fled ethnic purges by the Hutu government during the Rwandan revolution. The attempt to overthrow the government failed, though the RPF was able to maintain control of a border region. As it became clear that the war had reached a stalemate, the sides began peace negotiations in May 1992, which resulted in the signing in August 1993 of the Arusha Accords to create a power-sharing government.

The war radicalized the internal opposition. The RPF's show of force intensified support for the "Hutu Power" ideology. Hutu Power portrayed the RPF as an alien force intent on reinstating the Tutsi monarchy and enslaving the Hutus, a prospect which must be resisted at all costs. This ideology was embraced most wholeheartedly by the Coalition for the Defense of the Republic (CDR) who advocated racist principles known as the Hutu Ten Commandments. This political force led to the collapse of the first Habyarimana government in July 1993, when Prime Minister Dismas Nsengiyaremye criticized the president in writing for delaying a peace agreement. Habyarimana, a member of the MRND political party, dismissed Nsengiyarmye and appointed 'Madame' Agathe Uwilingiyimana, who was perceived to be less sympathetic to the RPF, in his stead. The main opposition parties refused to support Madame Agathe's appointment, each splitting into two factions: one calling for the unwavering defense of Hutu Power and the other, labeled "moderate", that sought a negotiated settlement to the war. As Prime Minister Uwilingiyimana was unable to form a coalition government, ratification of the Arusha Accords was impossible. The most extreme of the Hutu parties, the CDR, which openly called for ethnic cleansing of the Tutsi, was entirely unrepresented in the Accords.

The security situation deteriorated throughout 1993. Armed Hutu militias attacked Tutsis throughout the country, while high-ranking adherents of Hutu Power began to consider how the security forces might be turned to genocide. In February 1994, Roméo Dallaire, the head of the military force attached to the United Nations Assistance Mission for Rwanda (UNAMIR), which had been sent to observe the implementation of the Arusha Accords, informed his superiors, "Time does seem to be running out for political discussions, as any spark on the security side could have catastrophic consequences."

In the United Nations Security Council, early April 1994 saw a sharp disagreement between the United States and the non-permanent members of the council over UNAMIR. Despite a classified February Central Intelligence Agency (CIA) analysis predicting half a million deaths if the Arusha process failed, the U.S. was attempting to reduce its international commitments in the wake of the Somalia debacle and lobbied to end the mission. A compromise extending UNAMIR's mandate for three more months was finally reached on the evening of Tuesday, 5 April. Meanwhile, Habyarimana was finishing regional travel. On 4 April, he had flown to Zaire to meet with president Mobutu Sese Seko and on 6 April flew to Dar es Salaam, Tanzania for a one-day regional summit for heads of state convened by Tanzanian president Ali Hassan Mwinyi. For the return trip, Habyarimana offered to take Saleh Tambwe, Tanzania's Ambassador to Rwanda, with him back to Rwanda. He then extended the offer to President of Burundi Cyprien Ntaryamira. Ntaryamira accepted, preferring Habyarimana's faster Dassault Falcon 50 to his own transport. Several Burundian ministers joined the president on the flight. As a result of this new arrangement, Tambwe was not brought on board to make room for the Burundian entourage.

According to interim Prime Minister Jean Kambanda's testimony to the International Criminal Tribunal for Rwanda (ICTR), President Mobutu of neighboring Zaire (now DRC) had warned Habyarimana not to go to Dar es Salaam on 6 April. Mobutu reportedly said this warning had come from a very senior official in the Élysée Palace in Paris. There was a link between this warning, said Mobutu, and the subsequent suicide in the Élysée of François de Grossouvre, a senior high-ranking official who was working for President François Mitterrand and who killed himself on 7 April after learning about the downing of the Falcon. According to witnesses, president Habyarimana who had been warned that going on the plane is riskful, slowly stepped into the plane, according to some he was unsure and doubting about entering the plane but decided to anyway.

== Missile attack ==
Shortly before 8:20 pm local time (18:20 UTC), the presidential jet circled once around Kigali International Airport before coming in for final approach in clear skies. A weekly flight by a Belgian C-130 Hercules carrying UNAMIR troops returning from leave had been scheduled to land before the presidential jet, but was waved off to give the president priority.

A surface-to-air missile struck one of the wings of the Dassault Falcon, then a second missile hit its tail. The plane erupted into flames in mid-air before crashing into the garden of the presidential palace, exploding on impact. The plane carried three French crew and nine passengers.

The attack was witnessed by numerous people. One of two Belgian officers in the garden of a house in Kanombe, the district in which the airport is located, saw and heard the first missile climb into the sky, saw a red flash in the sky and heard an aircraft engine stopping, followed by another missile. He immediately called Major de Saint-Quentin, part of the French team attached to the Rwandan para-commando battalion (Commandos de recherche et d'action en profondeur), who advised him to organize protection for his Belgian comrades. Similarly, another Belgian officer stationed in an unused airport control tower saw the lights of an approaching aircraft, a light traveling upward from the ground and the aircraft lights going out. This was followed by a second light rising from the same place as the first and the plane turning into a falling ball of fire. This officer immediately radioed his company commander, who confirmed with the operational control tower that the plane was the presidential aircraft.

A Rwandan soldier in the military camp in Kanombe recalled:

You know, its engine sound was different from other planes; that is, the president's engine's sound ... We were looking towards where the plane was coming from, and we saw a projectile and we saw a ball of flame or flash and we saw the plane go down; and I saw it. I was the leader of the bloc so I asked the soldiers to get up and I told them "Get up because Kinani [a Kinyarwanda nickname for Habyarimana meaning 'famous' or 'invincible'] has been shot down." They told me, "You are lying." I said, "It's true." So I opened my wardrobe, I put on my uniform and I heard the bugle sound.

A Rwandan officer cadet at the airport who was listening to the Radio Télévision Libre des Mille Collines heard the announcer state that the presidential jet was coming in to land. The spoken broadcast stopped suddenly in favor of a selection of classical music.

=== Victims ===
All twelve aboard the Falcon were killed. They were:

- Juvénal Habyarimana, President of Rwanda
- Cyprien Ntaryamira, President of Burundi
- Bernard Ciza, Burundian Minister of Public Works
- Cyriaque Simbizi, Burundian Minister of Communication
- Major General Déogratias Nsabimana, Chief of Staff of the Rwandan Army
- Major Thaddée Bagaragaza, responsible for the maison militaire of the Rwandan president
- Colonel Elie Sagatwa, member of the special secretariat of the Rwandan president, Chief of the Military Cabinet of the Rwandan president
- Juvénal Renzaho, foreign affairs advisor to the Rwandan president
- Dr. Emmanuel Akingeneye, personal physician to the Rwandan president

French aircraft crew:

- Jacky Héraud (pilot)
- Jean-Pierre Minaberry (co-pilot)
- Jean-Michel Perrine (flight engineer)

== Immediate reaction ==
=== Rwanda ===
Chaos ensued on the ground. Presidential Guards, who had been waiting to escort the president home from the airport, threatened people with their weapons. Twenty Belgian peacekeepers who had been stationed along the perimeter of the airport were surrounded by the Presidential Guard and some were disarmed. The airport was closed and the circling Belgian Hercules was diverted to Nairobi.

In Camp Kanombe the bugle call immediately after the crash was taken by soldiers to mean that the Rwandan Patriotic Front had attacked the camp. The soldiers rushed to their units' armories to equip themselves. Soldiers of the paracommando brigade Commandos de recherche et d'action en profondeur assembled on the parade ground at around 9:00 pm while members of other units gathered elsewhere in the camp. At least one witness stated that about an hour after the crash there was the sound of gunfire in Kanombe. Munitions explosions at Camp Kanombe were also initially reported.

The senior officer for the Kigali operational zone called the Ministry of Defence with the news. Defence Minister Augustin Bizimana was out of the country, and the officer who took the call failed to reach Colonel Théoneste Bagosora, the director of the office of the minister of defence, who was apparently at a reception given by UNAMIR's Bangladeshi officers.

The news of the crash, initially reported as an explosion of UNAMIR's ammunition dump, was quickly relayed to UNAMIR Force Commander Dallaire. He ordered UNAMIR Kigali sector commander Luc Marchal to send a patrol to the crash site. Numerous people began calling UNAMIR seeking information, including Prime Minister Agathe Uwilingiyimana and Lando Ndasingwa. Uwilingiyimana informed Dallaire that she was trying to gather her cabinet but many ministers were afraid to leave their families. She also reported that all of the hardline ministers had disappeared. Dallaire asked the prime minister if she could confirm that it was the president's plane that had crashed, and called UNAMIR political head Jacques-Roger Booh-Booh to inform him of developments. Uwilingiyimana called back to confirm that it was the president's jet and he was presumed to be on board. She also asked for UNAMIR help in regaining control of the political situation, as she was legally next in the line of succession, but some moderate ministers allied to her had already begun fleeing their homes, fearing for their safety.

At 9:18 pm, Presidential Guards whom a UNAMIR report described as "nervous and dangerous" established a roadblock near the Hotel Méridien. Several other roadblocks had been set up prior to the attack as part of security preparations for Habyarimana's arrival. The patrol of UNAMIR Belgian soldiers sent to investigate the crash site was stopped at a Presidential Guards roadblock at 9:35 pm, disarmed and sent to the airport.

The para-commando brigade was ordered to collect bodies from the crash site and UN peacekeepers were prevented from accessing the site. Akingeneye was quickly recovered, but most of the corpses were damaged beyond immediate recognition. Habyarimana was identified lying in a flowerbed at about 21:30 on 6 April, while Ntaryamira was recognised at about 03:00 on 7 April. One Rwandan advisor was identified after his wife told the search party what clothes he had been wearing. The last to be identified were those of the French aircrew, discovered at dawn outside of the palace gardens. The bodies were taken into the Presidential Palace living room. Plans were initially made to take them to the hospital, but the renewal of conflict made this difficult and instead the two presidents' bodies were stored in a freezer at a nearby army barracks. Two French soldiers arrived at the crash and asked to be given the flight data recorder once it was recovered. The whereabouts of the flight data recorder were later unknown. The French military contacted Dallaire and offered to investigate the crash, which Dallaire refused immediately.

A Rwandan colonel who called the army command about 40 minutes after the crash was told that there was no confirmation that the president was dead. About half an hour later, roughly 9:30, the situation was still confused at army command, though it appeared clear that the presidential aircraft had exploded and had probably been hit by a missile. News arrived that Major-General Déogratias Nsabimana, the army chief of staff, had been on the plane. The officers present realized that they would have to appoint a new chief of staff in order to clarify the chain of command and began a meeting to decide whom to appoint. Col. Bagosora joined them soon afterward. At about 10:00 pm, Ephrem Rwabalinda, the government liaison officer to UNAMIR, called Dallaire to inform him that a crisis committee was about to meet. After informing his superiors in New York City of the situation, Dallaire went to attend the meeting, where he found Bagosora in charge.

=== Burundi ===
Observers feared that President Ntaryamira's death would lead to widespread violence in Burundi, as had happened when his predecessor, Melchior Ndadaye, was assassinated during a coup attempt in October 1993. However, unlike in Rwanda, the situation in Burundi remained peaceful. The Burundian government declared that the plane crash was caused by an accident and President of the National Assembly Sylvestre Ntibantunganya made a broadcast on television, flanked by the minister of defence and the army chief of staff, appealing for calm. Several hundred Tutsis marched through the capital to celebrate the deaths of the presidents. Diplomats reported that most Burundians believed that the assassination targeted Habyarimana, not Ntaryamira. On 16 April a requiem mass was held for Ntaryamira at the Regina Mundi Cathedral in Bujumbura, attended by thousands of people, and he and his two ministers were subsequently buried in a state funeral. Ntibantunganya succeeded Ntaryamira as President of Burundi. He believed that Ntaryamira's death was "by the facts of circumstance" and that he was not targeted.

=== International ===
In response to the assassinations, President Mwinyi declared three days of national mourning in Tanzania and sent messages of condolence to the Rwandan government, Burundian government, and the deceased presidents' families. He wrote in his memoirs that the Tanzanian government was "shocked" by the downing of the plane. A group of about 70 Rwandans and Burundians at the New Mwanza Hotel celebrated the assassination, leading Prime Minister John Malecela to order their arrest. This action was countermanded by the attorney general, who stated that their actions were not illegal.

A mourning period was also set up in Zaire.

President of the UN Security Council Colin Keating appealed for peace in Rwanda and Burundi and sent condolences to the families of the late presidents.

== Aftermath ==
At some point following the 6 April assassination, Juvenal Habyarimana's remains were obtained by president Mobutu of Zaire and stored in a private mausoleum in Gbadolite, Zaire (now Democratic Republic of the Congo). Mobutu promised Habyarimana's family that his body would eventually be given a proper burial in Rwanda. On 12 May 1997, as Laurent-Désiré Kabila's ADFL rebels were advancing on Gbadolite, Mobutu had the remains flown by cargo plane to Kinshasa where they waited on the tarmac of N'djili Airport for three days. On 16 May, the day before Mobutu fled Zaire, Habyarimana's remains were cremated under the supervision of an Indian Hindu leader. The Hindu leader's presence reflected the need to cremate the body and Mobutu's insistence some form of religious ceremony was performed rather than Habyarimana's own religion.

== Investigations ==
=== Launch site ===
Map of the airport and its surroundings

Two prominent investigations, which have been internationally recognized, have identified the Kanombe barracks as the likely source of the missile. In 2010, the "Mutsinzi Report" carried out by Rwandan officials in collaboration with British ballistics experts from the Royal Military Academy, identified a small area, which included a portion of the airport, the Kanombe camp, and a small area near the presidential residence, as the launch site. In January 2012, a French report was made public with similar findings.

Despite these reports, some have continued to cast doubt on this conclusion. These uncertainties stem from immediate assessments of the situation. French Judge Jean-Louis Bruguière had led an inquiry in 2004 which accused the RPF of shooting down the plane from Masaka Hill, but it was found to be based on the testimonies of witnesses who were not regarded as credible. A Belgian inquiry in 1994 concluded that the missile had been fired from Masaka Hill, but that "it would have been virtually impossible for a rebel soldier to have reached Masaka carrying missiles." The base was controlled by FAR forces, including the Presidential Guard and the para-commando battalion, and the Anti-Aircraft Battalion (LAA) were also based there. This report was widely reported to exonerate the RPF, although it did not actually do that, according to Filip Reyntjens.

=== Responsibility ===
While initial suspicion fell upon the Hutu extremists who carried out the subsequent genocide, there have been several reports since 2000 stating that the attack was carried out by the RPF on the orders of Paul Kagame, who went on to become president of Rwanda. All such evidence is heavily disputed and many academics, as well as the United Nations, have refrained from issuing a definitive finding. Mark Doyle, a BBC News correspondent who reported from Kigali through the 1994 genocide, noted in 2006 that the identities of the assassins "could turn out to be one of the great mysteries of the late 20th century."

A now-declassified US Department of State intelligence report from 7 April 1994 reports an unidentified source telling the US ambassador in Rwanda that "rogue Hutu elements of the military—possibly the elite presidential guard—were responsible for shooting down the plane." This conclusion was supported by other U.S. agencies, including the Defense Intelligence Agency, which reported on 9 May that "It is believed that the plane crash [...] was actually an assassination conducted by Hutu military hardliners.". Philip Gourevitch, in his 1998 book on the genocide, framed the thinking of the time:

Although Habyarimana's assassins have never been positively identified, suspicion has focused on the extremists in his entourage—notably the semiretired Colonel Théoneste Bagosora, an intimate of Madame Habyarimana, and a charter member of the akazu and its death squads, who said in January 1993 that he was preparing an apocalypse.

The 1997 report of the Belgian Senate stated that there was not enough information to determine specifics about the assassination. A 1998 report by the National Assembly of France posited two probable explanations. One is that the attack was carried out by groups of Hutu extremists, distressed by the advancement of negotiations with the RPF, the political and military adversary of the current regime, while the other is that it was the responsibility of the RPF, frustrated at the lack of progress in the Arusha Accords. Among the other hypotheses that were examined is one that implicates the French military, although there is no clear motive for a French attack on the Rwandan government. The 1998 French report made no determination between the two dominant theories. A 2000 report by the Organisation of African Unity does not attempt to determine responsibility.

A January 2000 article in the National Post reported that Louise Arbour, the chief prosecutor for the ICTR, had terminated an investigation into the shootdown after three Tutsi informants came forward in 1997 with detailed accusations against Paul Kagame and the RPF, claiming that they had been members of an "elite strike team" responsible for the downing. One of the three whistleblowers was Jean-Pierre Mugabe, who issued a declaration on the shootdown in April 2000. Following the National Post's article, a three-page memorandum written by investigator Michael Hourigan was sent to the ICTR where defense attorneys had requested it. (Note: Hourigan wrote two memoranda. One was a four-page memorandum written in January 1997 to brief Arbour; the second was three pages long and dated August 1997, written before his resignation. Sanitized copies of both memoranda are available.) Hourigan later stated that investigation into the shootdown had been clearly within his mandate and that he was "astounded" when Arbour made an about-face and told him it was not. This sequence of events was confirmed by Hourigan's boss, Jim Lyons, a former FBI agent who headed the so-called National Investigative Team. Lyons believes Arbour was acting on orders to shut down the investigation. An investigation by Luc Reydams concluded that there was no evidence of such orders. Reydams argued that the decision to shut down the investigation was "based on an assessment of the concrete conditions at the time" and that "any responsible Prosecutor would have concluded that pursuing the investigation would be futile and dangerous."

Arbour later stated that "It was my decision and my decision alone". According to Arbour, the OTP in Kigali was in a very difficult situation at the time:

We did not want to invest substantial resources only to have a judge refuse to confirm an indictment for lack of jurisdiction. I was not persuaded that the shooting down of the plane would in law constitute a war crime or a crime against humanity. It would be difficult to construe it as an act of genocide unless it was perpetrated by the leaders of the genocide to act as a trigger for the mass mobilization that followed. The situation was different fifteen years later. With all the high profile RPF defections and incriminating statements, it might have been possible to mount a case. [....] From a legal angle, it is not so much the shooting down of the plane that is of interest, but allegations of actions by the RPF that would have constituted crimes against humanity during the period of time (1994) over which the tribunal had jurisdiction. During my time at ICTR, we always assumed that this work would have to be done, but that we would have to be very cautious about how to proceed, preferably by working from outside the country. I understand however that from a historical perspective, the shooting of the plane will continue to be a great focus of speculation if there is no closure.

In 1998, the French anti-terrorist magistrate Jean-Louis Bruguière opened an investigation into the shootdown on behalf of the families of the French aircraft crew. On the basis of hundreds of interviews, Bruguière concluded that the assassination had been carried out on the orders of Paul Kagame, and issued arrest warrants against nine of Kagame's aides in 2006. In protest, Rwanda broke diplomatic relations with France. In November 2008 the German government implemented the first of these European warrants by arresting Rose Kabuye, Kagame's chief of protocol, upon her arrival in Frankfurt.

One of Bruguière's witnesses was Abdul Ruzibiza, a former lieutenant in the RPF who claimed that he was part of a cell that carried out the assassination with shoulder-fired SA-16 missiles. Days after the substance of Bruguière's report was leaked in 2004, Ruzibaza published his testimony in a press release, detailing his account and further accusing the RPF of starting the conflict, prolonging the genocide, carrying out widespread atrocities during the genocide and political repression. The former RPF officer published a book in 2005 with his account (Rwanda. L'histoire secrete), and testified under oath before the ICTR in 2006. The scholar René Lemarchand wrote about the book that "The careful marshalling of the evidence, the remarkably precise information concerning who did what, where, and when, the author's familiarity with the operational code of the RPF, leave few doubts in the reader's mind about Kagame's responsibility in triggering the event that led to the bloodshed." In November 2008 Ruzibiza suddenly claimed he had invented everything, but some months before his death in 2010, Ruzibiza explained that his retraction "is linked to my personal security and that of other witnesses". Yet Ruzubiza now changed his story by saying that he did not personally participate in the downing of the plane, but rather knew someone who did.

Linda Melvern wrote that Bruguière's evidence "was very sparse, and that some of it, concerning the alleged anti-aircraft missiles used to down the presidential jet, had already been rejected by a French Parliamentary enquiry." A 2007 article by Colette Braeckman in Le Monde Diplomatique strongly questions the reliability of Judge Bruguière's report and suggests the direct involvement of French military personnel acting for or with the Presidential Guard of the Rwanda governmental forces in the missile attack on the aircraft. In a 2007 interview with the BBC, Kagame said he would co-operate with an impartial inquiry "carried out by a judge who had nothing to do with Rwanda or France". The BBC concluded, "Whether any judge would want to take on such a task is quite another matter."

Paul Rusesabagina, a Rwandan of mixed Hutu and Tutsi origin whose life-saving efforts was the basis of the 2004 film Hotel Rwanda, has supported the allegation that Kagame and the RPF were behind the plane downing, and wrote in November 2006 that it "defies logic" that the UN Security Council had not ordered an investigation, as it had done following the far less consequential assassination of Rafic Hariri in 2005.

In February 2008, a 182-page indictment and international arrest warrants were issued against 40 current or former high-ranking Rwandan military officials of the Rwandan Patriotic Army/Rwandan Defence Forces by the Spanish Investigative Judge Fernando Andreu of the Audiencia Nacional. They were charged with a number of serious crimes between 1990 and 2002, including the shootdown of Habyarimana's plane. Unlike the French judicial enquiry, Andreu's indictment was in part based on the principle of universal jurisdiction.

Kagame also ordered the formation of a commission of Rwandans that was "charged with assembling proof of the involvement of France in the genocide". The commission issued its report to Kagame in November 2007 and its head, Jean de Dieu Mucyo, stated that the commission would now "wait for President Kagame to declare whether the inquiry was valid".

In January 2010, the Rwandan government released the "Report of the Investigation into the Causes and Circumstances of and Responsibility for the Attack of 06/04/1994 Against The Falcon 50 Rwandan Presidential Aeroplane Registration Number 9XR-NN," known as the Mutsinzi Report. The multivolume report implicates proponents of Hutu Power in the attack. Philip Gourevitch noted "two months ago, on the day after Rwanda's admission to the Commonwealth, France and Rwanda reestablished normal diplomatic relations. Before that happened, of course, the Rwandans had shared the about-to-be-released Mutsinzi report with the French. The normalization of relations amounts to France's acceptance of the report's conclusions."

== Legacy ==
Ntaryamira's death is commemorated by the Burundian government on 6 April of each year. The death of the Burundian president and two of his ministers in the plane shootdown has generally been overshadowed in public memory by Habyarimana's death and the subsequent Rwandan genocide.

== See also ==
- List of heads of state and government who died in aviation accidents and incidents
- List of heads of state and government who died in office
- List of heads of state and government who were assassinated or executed
- List of political conspiracies
- List of unsolved murders (1980–1999)

== Sources ==
- Dallaire, Roméo; Beardsley, Brent (2003). Shake Hands with the Devil: The Failure of Humanity in Rwanda. New York: Carroll & Graf Publishers. ISBN 0-7867-1487-5.
- Gaillard, Philippe; Barrada, Hamid (28 April 1994). "Le récit en direct de la famille Habyarimana". Jeune Afrique (in French). No. 1738. pp. 12–19.
- Mamdani, Mahmood (2001). When Victims Become Killers: Colonialism, Nativism, and the Genocide in Rwanda. Princeton, NJ: Princeton University Press. ISBN 0-691-10280-5.
- Melvern, Linda (2004). Conspiracy to Murder: The Rwandan Genocide. New York: Verso. ISBN 0-312-30486-2.
