= Abdul Ruzibiza =

Rwandan militant

- Born: June 28, 1970; Gitagata
- Died: September 22, 2010 (aged 40); Norway
- Organization: Rwandan Patriotic Front
- Known for: Claimed to be part of a group that carried out the assassination of President of Rwanda Juvénal Habyarimana and Burundian president Cyprien Ntaryamira

Abdul Joshua Ruzibiza (June 28, 1970 – September 22, 2010) was a former member of the Rwandan Patriotic Front who, at one time, claimed to be part of a group that carried out assassinated President of Rwanda Juvénal Habyarimana and Burundian president Cyprien Ntaryamira in April 1994, an event that marked the beginning of the Rwandan genocide.

== Early life ==
Ruzibiza claimed to have been born a Tutsi in Gitagata, Kanzenze commune in Bugesera He joined the Rwandan Patriotic Front (RPF) in 1987 while he was in Burundi and participated in the 1990 attack launching the Rwandan Civil War.

== Exile ==
In 2001, he left Rwanda for "security reasons" and in 2005 released a book entitled Rwanda. L'histoire secrète ("Rwanda: The Secret History"). In the book, Ruzibiza accused the RPF of assassinations and massive human rights abuses. His testimony was subsequently heavily relied upon in reports prepared by Jean-Louis Bruguière, the magistrate in charge of investigating the deaths of several Frenchmen in the presidential assassinations. Ruzibiza stated that he was responsible for surveying the sites used for the missile attack on the presidential plane. Ruzibiza later gave testimony before the International Criminal Tribunal for Rwanda in 2006. In November 2008, Ruzibiza recanted at least parts of his story, stating that his account of the assassination in Rwanda: The Secret History is not true and that the book was actually written by several people. That was occasioned by the trial of Rose Kabuye, an aide to Rwandan president Paul Kagame, whom Ruzibiza asserted he never named as an accomplice. Ruzibiza criticized Bruguière, stating, "If he is basing his investigation on me, then I have the right to say that he is a big manipulator... he is saying what I have not said." But in June 2010 Ruzibiza explained that the retraction "is linked to my personal security and that of other witnesses", and he confirmed his earlier damning statements about the RPF, although he now changed his story by saying that he did not personally participate in the downing of Habyarimana's airplane, but rather knew someone who did, who he did not want to name.

== Death ==
Ruzibiza died at the age of 40. He was living in Norway and had been suffering from cancer for some time.
