= Josephine Dusabimana =

Josephine Dusabimana (born 1957 in Belgian Congo) is a Rwandan woman who saved the lives of 12 Tutsis during the Rwandan genocide.

== Activism ==
In April 1994, Dusabimana, a Hutu woman, lived in a two-room house on the shore of Lake Kivu with her husband and children. The family were poor farmers who grew beans and sorghum. Dusabimana viewed her Tutsi neighbors positively, having lived alongside them her whole life and seeing them as friends.

On April 7, she learned of the assassination of Juvénal Habyarimana and Cyprien Ntaryamira, which had occurred on April 6, and the violence being enacted against Tutsis. She took in two Tutsi men who needed help into her home. She traded her goats to a cousin in exchange for a canoe, and brought the men to the shore of Lake Kivu that night, hoping they could paddle across the lake to the Democratic Republic of the Congo. She hid the canoe's paddles in sweet potato leaves to avoid suspicion while transporting them. While walking to the lake, she lied to some passersby that she was planting sweet potatoes, saying "I do not know when all this chaos will be over but in the meantime I must keep planting".

The following week, Dusabimana sheltered another Tutsi man and his two daughters. With the help of her children, she stole a canoe belonging to a genocide perpetrator in the village and gave it to the Tutsi family, along with some soybeans to eat during the escape.

On another occasion, Dusabimana's home was attacked by gendarmes while she was sheltering a woman and her infant. The woman and child were shot and killed, and both Dusabimana and her husband sustained injuries, with her husband later dying from his wounds.

In total, Dusabimana saved the lives of 12 Tutsis during the genocide.

== Recognition ==
Following the genocide, some of the survivors whom Dusabimana helped gave her gifts of cows in gratitude. In 2011, Dusabimana was given a certificate of honor for her work by then-United States Secretary of State Hillary Clinton.
