= Municipal law =

Area of law

Municipal law is the national, domestic, or internal law of a sovereign state and is defined in opposition to international law. Municipal law includes many levels of law: not only national law but also state, provincial, territorial, regional, or local law. The state may regard them as distinct categories of law, but international law is largely uninterested in the distinction and treats them all as one. Similarly, international law makes no distinction between the ordinary law of the state and its constitutional law.

Article 27 of the Vienna Convention on the Law of Treaties from 1969 provides that if a treaty conflicts with a state's municipal law (including the state's constitution), the state is still obliged to meet its obligations under the treaty. The only exception is provided by Article 46 of the Vienna Convention if a state's expression of consent to be bound by a treaty was a manifest violation of a "rule of its internal law of fundamental importance".

== Sources ==
- Reydams, Luc Universal Jurisdiction: International and Municipal Legal Perspectives, (Oxford Monographs in International Law), (Oxford University Press, 2004) ISBN 978-0-19-927426-0.
- Paolo Davide Farah e Piercarlo Rossi, "National Energy Policies and Energy Security in the Context of Climate Change and Global Environmental Risks: A Theoretical Framework for Reconciling Domestic and International Law Through a Multiscalar and Multilevel Approach", European Energy and Environmental Law Review (EEELR), Kluwer Law International, Vol. 20, No. 6, pp. 232–244, 2011.
