= Mucyo Commission =

Inquiry into French culpability in the Rwandan Genocide

The National Independent Commission Charged With Gathering Evidence to Show the Implication of the French Government in the Genocide Perpetrated in Rwanda in 1994, commonly referred to as the Mucyo Commission after its Chairman, is a Rwandan government commission established by Paul Kagame in order to ascertain the nature of French involvement in the 1994 genocide. It released a report in August 2008, 331 pages in total, claiming to detail that France was not only complicit, but had engaged in actions on the level of conspiracy to genocide. Allegations included covert weapons dealing and training of interahamwe militants before and during the genocide, providing protection and shelter for some of the worst genocidaires, illegitimate humanitarian aims during Operation Turquoise and even French black ops on the ground of Rwanda during the genocide. This report, however, has been subject to great controversy and skepticism in the international community. It has been accused of being politically charged to benefit the Rwandan Patriotic Front.

== History ==
The commission was established in 2004 when a bill authorizing it was passed through the Council of Ministers Organic Law No. 05/2005. The commission was chaired by Jean de Dieu Mucyo, former Attorney General of Rwanda and included a variety of high level Rwandan officials, including the Vice-President.

== Criticism ==
According to the scholar Filip Reyntjens:

"The Mucyo report was problematic for several reasons. Very selective in the use of sources and citations, it avoided mentioning any responsibility of the RPF in the events leading up to the genocide. [...] Certain data were unlikely, to say the least; for instance, Tutsi were thrown out of helicopters above Nyungwe forest, but later told their story to the commission. At least one document (on page 295 of the report) was a crude fake."
