= Rose Kabuye =

Rwandan soldier and politician

- Born: Rose Kanyange; 22 April 1961 (age 65); Muvumba, Rwanda
- Citizenship: Rwandan
- Occupations: Retired Lieutenant Colonel, politician, businesswoman
- Known for: Highest ranking woman in Rwandan Army, women's rights advocacy
- Notable work: Mayor of Kigali, Chief of State Protocol, Member of Parliament
- Awards: Rwandan National Liberation Medal, Campaign Against Genocide Medal

Voice of America pronunciation of "Rose Kabuye" from the region of Rwanda. Transliteration (American pronunciation recommendation): "ROHZ kah-BOO-yeh"

Rose Kabuye

Rose Kabuye (née Kanyange; 22 April 1961 in Muvumba, Rwanda) is a retired Lieutenant Colonel in the Rwandan Army and until late 2023, she was the highest ranking woman ever to serve in her country's armed forces. She is currently working in the private sector as chief executive officer of Virunga Logistics and Startech Limited but is best known for her work as a fighter for the Rwandan Patriotic Front during the Rwandan Civil War. She subsequently became Mayor of Kigali City, Rwandan Chief of State Protocol, and a member of the Rwandan parliament. Because of her participation in the liberation struggle, she was awarded The Rwandan National Liberation Medal and the Campaign Against Genocide Medal. She was serving as the chief of protocol of Rwandan President Paul Kagame in November 2008 when she was arrested in Frankfurt, Germany on charges that were lifted in March 2009.

== Rwandan Civil War ==
Raised and educated in Uganda, Rose Kabuye began her military training there in 1986 following graduation from Makerere University with a degree in Political Science and Social Administration. She joined the Rwandan Patriotic Front (RPF), in the early 1980s. In the rank of a major, she took part in the 1990 invasion of Northern Rwanda from Uganda to win refugees the right to return to their homeland. In 1993, she became the RPF's Director of Welfare and was placed in charge of caring for sick and disabled victims of the war. She became a leader of RPF women fighters and organised regular meetings to engage them as a group and provide vital psychological support. Her skills as a negotiator began to emerge during her participation in 1992 peace talks between the RPF and the former Rwandan government.

== Mayor of Kigali ==
In 1994, immediately following the war, Rose Kabuye was appointed mayor of the capital Kigali. where she was intimately involved in humanitarian activities as well as rehabilitating vital infrastructure including water and electricity. As mayor through 1998, she focused on solving housing problems in her city by constructing temporary shelters for the poor as well as survivors of the Rwandan genocide. She is credited with reorganisation and rehabilitation of Kigali's commercial activities during her tenure. She established the Kigali Lottery and directed proceeds to pay for the education of 100 genocide orphans.

== Member of Parliament and champion of women ==
In 1998, Rose Kabuye became a Member of the Rwandan Parliament where she served as Chairperson of the Defense and Security Committee. As a member of the Women's Parliamentary Forum, she was involved in the mobilisation of women on a grassroots level and worked to rescind a range of laws that discriminated against women. She was an advocate for the training of women leaders and the elevation of women in more decision-making areas of Rwandan government. Rwanda now has the highest percentage of women in Parliament of any parliamentary nation in the world. While MP, Rose Kabuye participated in the drafting of the new Rwandan constitution and its dissemination to the populace for input and adoption.

== Chief of State Protocol under President Kagame ==
In 2003, Rose Kabuye began a 7-year tenure as Chief of State Protocol under Rwandan President Paul Kagame. In that role, she advised top Rwandan government leaders on matters of national and international protocol; accompanied the President on all official travel; and planned and hosted numerous ceremonial events for visiting heads of state and other visiting dignitaries. She planned and coordinated, among other major events, The New Partnership for Africa's Development (2000) and COMESA – the Common Market for Eastern and Southern Africa. She also coordinated State visits to Rwanda including those by US president and Mrs. George W. Bush and French President Nicolas Sarkozy. She accompanied President Kagame on his visits to the United Nations General Assembly in New York.

== Other volunteer leadership roles ==
Rose Kabuye served as Chair Person for the Kigali City AIDS Committee launching programs to educate Rwandans about HIV/AIDS and how to prevent its spread. She served on the Board of Ndabaga—an NGO for Demobilized Women Soldiers. She is an Executive Member of Forum for African Women Educationlists (FAWE Rwanda Chapter) and core member of Women Waging Peace.

== Controversy over 1994 plane crash ==
In 1994, a plane carrying the president of Rwanda (Juvenal Habyarimana) and the President of Burundi (Cyprien Ntaryamira) was shot down near Kigali airport, killing both leaders. This event was the catalyst for the Rwandan genocide which, over the course of some 100 days, claimed the lives of between 800,000 and one million people.

In November 2006, French Judge Jean-Louis Bruguière issued an arrest warrant for nine people, including Rose Kabuye, for allegedly having been involved in the attack. On 9 November 2008, she was arrested in Germany while travelling on business. After the arrest, Rwandan President Kagame expelled the German ambassador and ordered his envoy in Berlin to return to Kigali "for consultations." Demonstrators staged protests in front of the German embassy in Kigali carrying signs that read: "Shame on you, Germany! Seventy years after the Holocaust, you arrest a woman who put a stop to genocide."

Charges against Rose Kabuye were lifted in March 2009.
