= Déogratias Nsabimana =

Rwandan military officer

- Born: 23 August 1945; Ruhengeri, Rwanda
- Died: 6 April 1994 (aged 48); Kigali, Nyarugenge, Kigali, Rwanda
- Relatives: Forces armées rwandaises
- Military career
- Allegiance: Rwanda
- Branch: Rwandan Armed Forces
- Rank: Major-general
- Commands: Chief of Staff of the Rwandan Army
- Conflicts: Rwandan Civil War †

Déogratias Nsabimana (23 August 1945 – 6 April 1994) was a general and Chief of Staff of the Rwandan Armed Forces (FAR), under President Habyarimana from April 1992 until he was killed on 6 April 1994 alongside Habyarimana. He also served as Minister of Defense.

== Military career ==
In October 1990, the Rwandan Patriotic Front (RPF), a force of mostly Tutsi Rwandan refugees and expatriates, crossed the border from Uganda and invaded Rwanda. Nsabimana distinguished himself on the battlefront. As a result, in April 1992, Nsabimana was appointed Chief of Staff of the Rwandan Army. In this role, he supported the development of a new paratrooper unit. Allegedly, as a member of Network Zero (a communication association of military and political leaders), he helped train the future death squads. When evidence of cooperation between the Rwandan army and the Interahamwe militia appeared, he said that he had no knowledge of this cooperation.

Instead, Nsabimana argued to the Secretary of Defense that the Ministry of Justice should deal with this matter. Nsabimana also presented a plan; the historian Ferdinand Nahimana would draw up a history lesson program for the Rwandan army. The lessons should deal with the offences of the former Tutsi rulers. In December 1993, as part of the Arusha Agreement, a power-sharing agreement was put into effect, with the rebel movement Rwandan Patriotic Front (RPF) which saw some 600 soldiers enter Kigali. Nsabimana was opposed to the Arusha Agreement. The following year, Nsabimana was allegedly involved in the application of stockpiles for the Interahamwe. According to a witness, in March 1994, Nsabimana discussed with Colonel Gratien Kabiligi, chief of military operations, ways the RPF could be defeated after the Arusha Peace Agreement came into effect. It was suggested using soldiers living outside military camps in civilian parts of the city as well as former soldiers (who would command the recruits), who were to be “reliable civilians.” Groups were to be organized within administrative units, with direction provided by soldiers working closely with administrative authorities. The commander of operations in Kigali was then ordered to quickly prepare lists of members of the armed forces living in residential areas. The prefect of the city was asked to provide similar information on reservists and reliable civilians as soon as possible.

On 1 April 1994, the Prefect of Kigali sent Nsabimana a list of several hundred reservists and others (most presumably civilians) chosen for civilian defence. Their names were listed by cell, sector, and commune, the standard administrative units.

== Death ==
On 6 April 1994, Nsabimana, along with President Juvénal Habyarimana, was returning from high-level talks in Dar es Salaam when his aircraft, Dassault Falcon 50, was hit by two surface-to-air missiles and crashed just outside the presidential compound in Kigali. the plane was carrying twelve aboard, including President Cyprien Ntaryamira of Burundi.

Rwandan President Paul Kagame has expressed the belief that Nsabimana had been conspiring against Habyarimana and that he had followed him to Dar es Salaam to keep him under observation.
