= Rwandan Civil War =

1990–1994 armed struggle in Rwanda

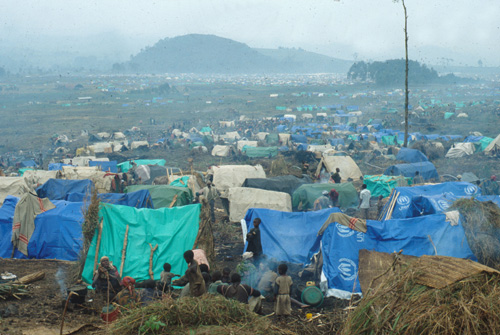
- Rwandan refugee camp in Eastern Zaire, 1994
Date	1 October 1990 − 18 July 1994 (3 years, 9 months, 2 weeks and 3 days)
Location	Rwanda
Result	Rwandan Patriotic Front (RPF) victory

Belligerents
Rwandan Patriotic Front (RPF)	Rwanda; Zaire (1990); France

Commanders and leaders
Fred Rwigyema †; Paul Kagame; Pasteur Bizimungu; Peter Bayingana †	(Rwanda) Juvénal Habyarimana X; (Rwanda) Déogratias Nsabimana X; (Rwanda) Théoneste Bagosora; (Rwanda) Théodore Sindikubwabo; (Rwanda) Augustin Bizimungu

Strength
RPF: 20,000	(Rwanda) Rwandan Armed Forces: 35,000; (France) French Armed Forces: 600 (1990); 400 (1993); 2,500 (1994)

Casualties and losses
- 7,500 combatants killed; 500,000–800,000 civilians killed in the Rwandan genocide; 15 UNAMIR peacekeepers killed

The Rwandan Civil War was a large-scale civil war in Rwanda which was fought between the Rwandan Armed Forces, representing the incumbent Third Rwandese Republic, and the rebel Rwandan Patriotic Front (RPF) from 1 October 1990 to 18 July 1994. The war arose from the long-running dispute between the Hutu and Tutsi groups within the Rwandan population. The Rwandan Revolution, which broke out in 1959, had replaced the Tutsi monarchy with a Hutu-led republic, forcing more than 336,000 Tutsis to seek refuge in neighbouring countries. A group of these refugees in Uganda founded the RPF which, under the leadership of Fred Rwigyema and Paul Kagame, became a battle-ready army by the late 1980s.

The war began on 1 October 1990, when the RPF invaded north-eastern Rwanda, advancing 60 km (37 mi) into the country. They suffered a major setback when Rwigyema was killed in action on the second day. The Rwandan Army, assisted by expeditionary troops from France, gained the upper hand and the RPF were largely defeated by the end of October. Kagame, who had been in the United States during the invasion, returned to take command. He withdrew troops to the Virunga Mountains for several months before attacking again. The RPF began an insurgency, which continued until mid-1992 with neither side able to gain the upper hand. A series of protests forced Rwandan President Juvénal Habyarimana to begin peace negotiations with the RPF and domestic opposition parties. Despite disruption and killings by Hutu Power, a group of extremists opposed to any deal, and a fresh RPF offensive in early 1993, the negotiations were successfully concluded with the signing of the Arusha Accords in August 1993.

An uneasy peace followed, during which the terms of the accords were gradually implemented. RPF troops were deployed to a compound in Kigali and the peace-keeping United Nations Assistance Mission for Rwanda (UNAMIR) was sent to the country. The Hutu Power movement was steadily gaining influence and planned a "final solution" to exterminate the Tutsi. This plan was put into action following the assassination of President Habyarimana on 6 April 1994. Over the course of about a hundred days, between 500,000 and 1,000,000 Tutsi and moderate Hutu were killed in the Rwandan genocide. The RPF quickly resumed the civil war. They captured territory steadily, encircling cities and cutting off supply routes. By mid-June they had surrounded the capital, Kigali, and on 4 July they seized it. The war ended later that month when the RPF captured the last territory held by the interim government, forcing the government and genocidaires into Zaire.

The victorious RPF assumed control of the country, with Paul Kagame as de facto leader. Kagame served as vice president from 1994 and as president from 2000. The RPF began a programme of rebuilding the infrastructure and economy of the country, bringing genocide perpetrators to trial, and promoting reconciliation between Hutu and Tutsi. In 1996 the RPF-led Rwandan government launched an offensive against refugee camps in Zaire, home to exiled leaders of the former regime and millions of Hutu refugees. This action started the First Congo War, which removed long-time dictator Mobutu Sese Seko from power. As of 2026, Kagame and the RPF remain the dominant political force in Rwanda.

== Background ==
=== Pre-independence Rwanda and origins of Hutu, Tutsi, and Twa ===
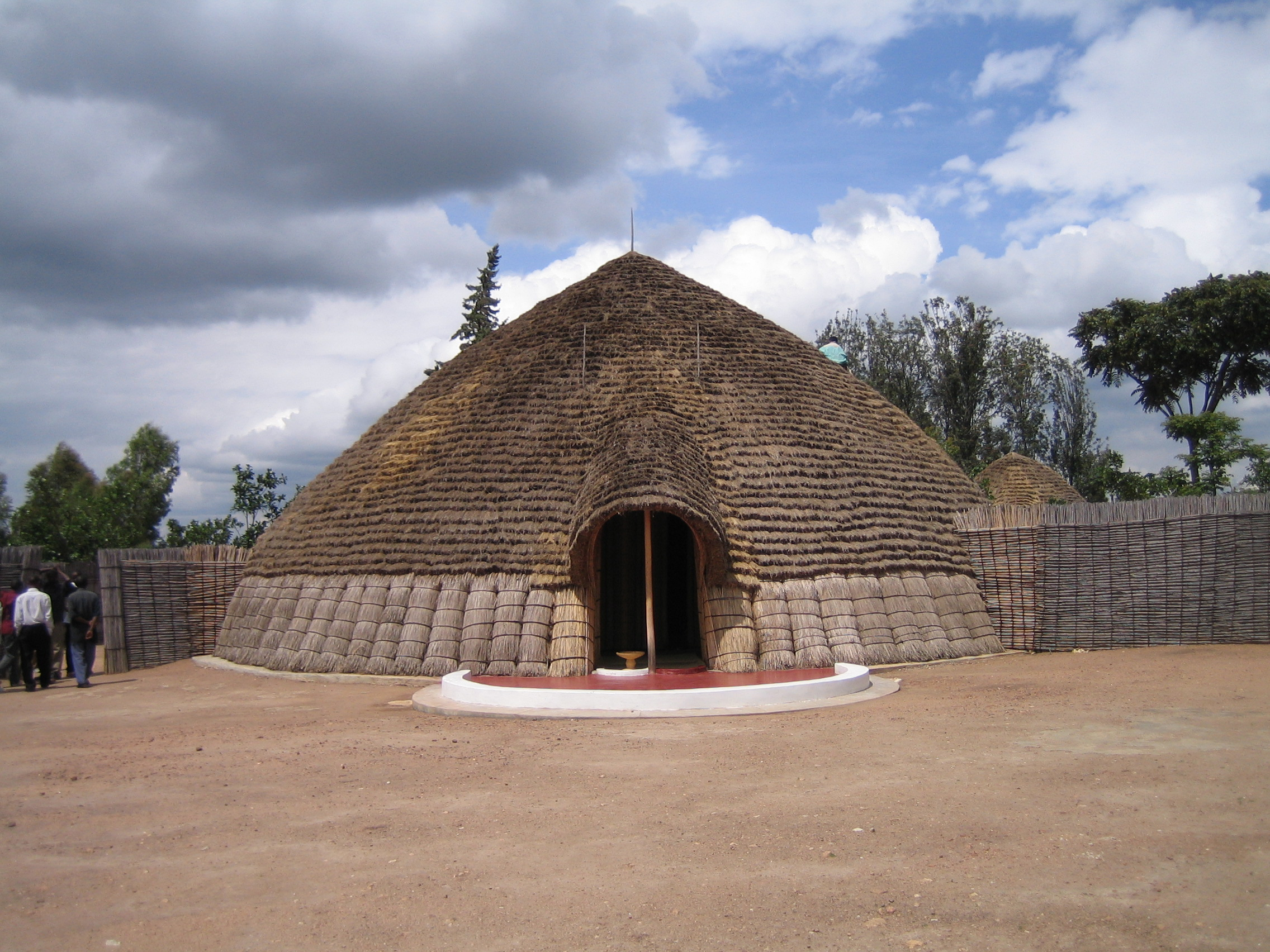
A reconstruction of the King of Rwanda's palace at Nyanza

The earliest inhabitants of what is now Rwanda were the Twa, Indigenous pygmy hunter-gatherers who settled in the area between 8000 BC and 3000 BC and remain in Rwanda today. Between 700 BC and 1500 AD, Bantu groups migrated into the region and began to clear forest land for agriculture. The forest-dwelling Twa lost much of their land and moved to the slopes of mountains. Historians have several theories regarding the Bantu migrations. One theory is that the first settlers were Hutu, and the Tutsi migrated later and formed a distinct racial group, possibly originating from the Horn of Africa. An alternative theory is that the migration was slow and steady, with incoming groups integrating into rather than conquering the existing society. Under this theory, the Hutu and Tutsi are a later class, rather than racial, distinction.

The population coalesced, first into clans (ubwoko) and into around eight kingdoms by 1700. The Kingdom of Rwanda, ruled by the Tutsi Nyiginya clan, became dominant from the mid-eighteenth century, expanding through conquest and assimilation. It achieved its greatest extent under the reign of Kigeli Rwabugiri in 1853–1895. Rwabugiri expanded the kingdom west and north, and initiated administrative reforms which caused a rift to grow between the Hutu and Tutsi populations. These included uburetwa, a system of forced labour which Hutu had to perform to regain access to land seized from them, and ubuhake, under which Tutsi patrons ceded cattle to Hutu or Tutsi clients in exchange for economic and personal service. Rwanda and neighbouring Burundi were assigned to Germany by the Berlin Conference of 1884, and Germany established a presence in 1897 with the formation of an alliance with the King. German policy was to rule through the Rwandan monarchy, enabling colonisation with fewer European troops. The colonists favoured the Tutsi over the Hutu when assigning administrative roles, believing them to be migrants from Ethiopia and racially superior. The Rwandan King welcomed the Germans, and used their military strength to reinforce his rule and expand the kingdom. In World War I, Belgian forces took control of Rwanda and Burundi during the Tabora and Mahenge offensives, and from 1926 began a policy of more direct colonial rule. The Belgian administration, in conjunction with Catholic clerics, modernised the local economy. They also increased taxes and imposed forced labour on the population. Tutsi supremacy remained, reinforced by Belgian support of two monarchies, leaving the Hutu disenfranchised. In 1935, Belgium introduced identity cards classifying each individual as Tutsi, Hutu, Twa, or Naturalised. It had previously been possible for wealthy Hutu to become honorary Tutsi, but the identity cards prevented further movement between the groups.

=== Revolution, exile of Tutsi, and the Hutu republic ===
After 1945, a Hutu counter-elite developed, demanding the transfer of power from Tutsi to Hutu. The Tutsi leadership responded by trying to negotiate a speedy independence on their terms but found that the Belgians no longer supported them. There was a simultaneous shift in the Catholic Church, with prominent conservative figures in the early Rwandan church replaced by younger clergy of working-class origin. Of these, a greater proportion were Flemish rather than Walloon Belgians and sympathised with the plight of the Hutu. In November 1959, the Hutu began a series of riots and arson attacks on Tutsi homes, following false rumours of the death of a Hutu sub-chief in an assault by Tutsi activists. Violence quickly spread across the whole country, beginning the Rwandan Revolution. The King and Tutsi politicians launched a counter-attack in an attempt to seize power and ostracise the Hutu and Belgians, but were thwarted by Belgian Colonel Guy Logiest, who was brought in by the colonial Governor. Logiest re-established law and order and began a programme of overt promotion and protection of the Hutu elite. He replaced many Tutsi chiefs with Hutu and effectively forced King Kigeli V into exile.

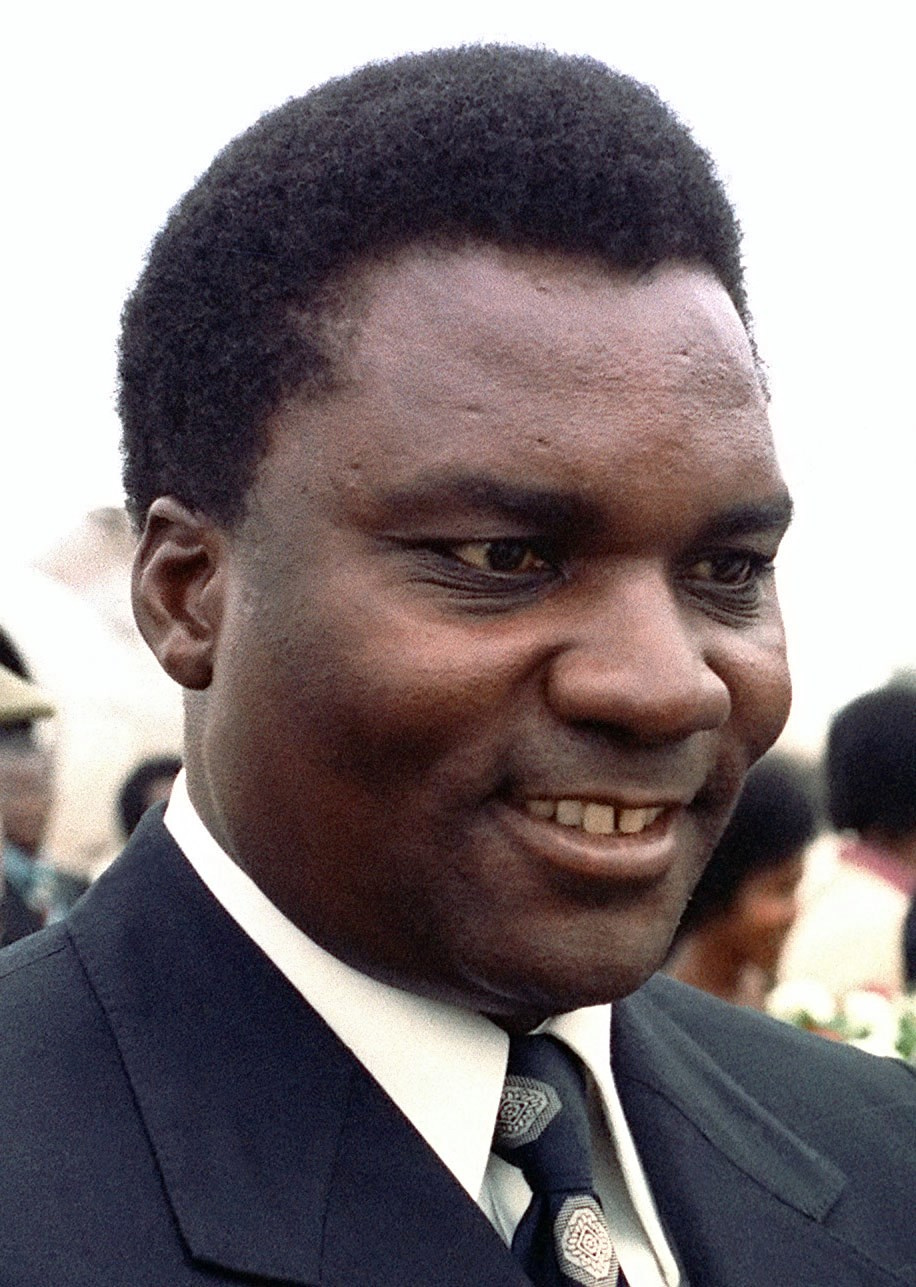
Hutu army officer Juvénal Habyarimana (pictured) became President of Rwanda after a 1973 coup.

Logiest and Hutu leader Grégoire Kayibanda declared the country an autonomous republic in 1961 and it became independent in 1962. More than 336,000 Tutsi left Rwanda by 1964 to escape the Hutu purges, mostly to the neighbouring countries of Burundi, Uganda, Tanzania and Zaire. Many of the Tutsi exiles lived as refugees in their host countries, and sought to return to Rwanda. Some supported the new Rwandan Government, but others formed armed groups and launched attacks on Rwanda, the largest of which advanced close to Kigali in 1963. These groups were known in Kinyarwanda as the inyenzi (cockroaches). Historians do not know the origin of this term—it is possible the rebels coined it themselves, the name reflecting that they generally attacked at night. The inyenzi label resurfaced in the 1990s as a highly derogatory term for the Tutsi, used by Hutu hardliners to dehumanise them. The inyenzi attacks of the 1960s were poorly equipped and organised and the government defeated them. The last significant attack was made in desperation from Burundi in December 1963 but failed due to bad planning and lack of equipment. The government responded to this attack with the slaughter of an estimated 10,000 Tutsi within Rwanda.

Kayibanda presided over a Hutu republic for the next decade, imposing an autocratic rule similar to the pre-revolution feudal monarchy. In 1973 Hutu army officer Juvénal Habyarimana toppled Kayibanda in a coup. He founded the National Republican Movement for Democracy and Development (MRND) party in 1975, and promulgated a new constitution following a 1978 referendum, making the country a one-party state in which every citizen had to belong to the MRND. Anti-Tutsi discrimination continued under Habyarimana but the country enjoyed greater economic prosperity and reduced anti-Tutsi violence. A coffee price collapse in the late 1980s caused a loss of income for Rwanda's wealthy elite, precipitating a political fight for power and access to foreign aid receipts. The family of first lady Agathe Habyarimana, known as the akazu, were the principal winners in this fight. The family had a more respected lineage than that of the President, having ruled one of the independent states near Gisenyi in the nineteenth century. Habyarimana therefore relied on them in controlling the population of the north-west. The akazu exploited this to their advantage, and Habyarimana was increasingly unable to rule without them. The economic situation forced Habyarimana to greatly reduce the national budget, which led to civil unrest. On the advice of French president François Mitterrand, Habyarimana declared a commitment to multi-party politics but took no action to bring this about. Student protests followed and by late 1990 the country was in crisis.

=== Formation of the RPF and preparation for war ===
The organisation which became the Rwandan Patriotic Front (RPF) was founded in 1979 in Uganda. It was initially known as the Rwandan Refugees Welfare Association and then from 1980 as the Rwandan Alliance for National Unity (RANU). It formed in response to persecution and discrimination against the Tutsi refugees by the regime of Ugandan President Milton Obote. Obote accused the Rwandans of collaboration with his predecessor, Idi Amin, including occupying the homes and stealing the cattle of Ugandans who had fled from Amin. Meanwhile, Tutsi refugees Fred Rwigyema and Paul Kagame had joined Yoweri Museveni's rebel Front for National Salvation (FRONASA). Museveni fought alongside Obote to defeat Amin in 1979 but withdrew from the government following Obote's disputed victory in the 1980 general election. With Rwigyema and Kagame he formed a new rebel army, the National Resistance Army (NRA). The NRA's goal was to overthrow Obote's government, in what became known as the Ugandan Bush War. President Obote remained hostile to the Rwandan refugees throughout his presidency and RANU was forced into exile in 1981, relocating to Nairobi in Kenya. In 1982, with the authority of Obote, local district councils in the Ankole region issued notices requiring refugees to be evicted from their homes and settled in camps. These evictions were violently implemented by Ankole youth militia. Many displaced Rwandans attempted to cross the border to Rwanda, but the Habyarimana regime confined them to isolated camps and closed the border to prevent further migration. Faced with the threat of statelessness, many more Tutsi refugees in Uganda chose to join Museveni's NRA.

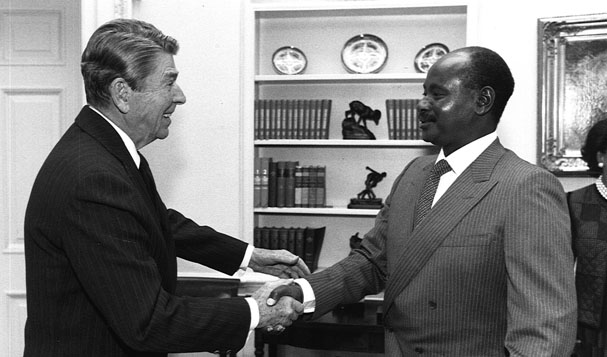
Ugandan president Yoweri Museveni with Ronald Reagan at the White House in October 1987

In 1986, the NRA captured Kampala with a force of 14,000 soldiers, including 500 Rwandans, and formed a new government. After Museveni was inaugurated as president he appointed Kagame and Rwigyema as senior officers in the new Ugandan army. The experience of the Bush War inspired Rwigyema and Kagame to consider an attack against Rwanda, with the goal of allowing the refugees to return home. As well as fulfilling their army duties, the pair began building a covert network of Rwandan Tutsi refugees within the army's ranks, intended as the nucleus for such an attack. With the pro-refugee Museveni in power, RANU was able to move back to Kampala. At its 1987 convention it renamed itself to the Rwandan Patriotic Front and it too committed to returning the refugees to Rwanda by any means possible. In 1988, a leadership crisis within the RPF prompted Fred Rwigyema to intervene in the organisation and take control, replacing Peter Bayingana as RPF president. Kagame and other senior members of Rwigyema's Rwandan entourage within the NRA also joined, Kagame assuming the vice presidency. Bayingana remained as the other vice president but resented the loss of the leadership. Bayingana and his supporters attempted to start the war with an invasion in late 1989 without the support of Rwigyema, but this was quickly repelled by the Rwandan Army.

Rwandan President Habyarimana was aware of the increasing number of Tutsi exiles in the Ugandan Army and made representations to President Museveni on the matter. At the same time many native Ugandans and Baganda officers in the NRA began criticising Museveni over his appointment of Rwandan refugees to senior positions. He therefore demoted Kagame and Rwigyema in 1989. They remained de facto senior officers but the change in official status, and the possibility that they might lose access to the resources of the Ugandan military, caused them to accelerate their plans to invade Rwanda. In 1990 a dispute in south-western Uganda between Ugandan ranch owners and squatters on their land, many of whom were Rwandans, led to a wider debate on indigeneity and eventually to the explicit labeling of all Rwandan refugees as non-citizens. Realising the precariousness of their own positions, the opportunity afforded by both the renewed drive of refugees to leave Uganda, and the instability on the Rwandan domestic scene, Rwigyema and Kagame decided in mid-1990 to effect their invasion plans immediately. It is likely President Museveni knew of the planned invasion but did not explicitly support it. In mid-1990 Museveni ordered Rwigyema to attend an officer training course at the Command and General Staff College in Fort Leavenworth in the United States, and was also planning overseas deployments for other senior Rwandans in the army. This may have been a tactic to reduce the threat of an RPF invasion of Rwanda. After two days of discussion Rwigyema persuaded Museveni that following years of army duty he needed a break and was allowed to remain in Uganda. Museveni then ordered Kagame to attend instead. The RPF leadership allowed him to go, to avoid suspicion, even though it meant his missing the beginning of the war.

== Course of the war ==
=== 1990 invasion and death of Rwigyema ===
On 1 October 1990 fifty RPF rebels deserted their Ugandan Army posts and crossed the border from Uganda into Rwanda, killing a Rwandan customs guard at the Kagitumba border post and forcing others to flee. They were followed by hundreds more rebels, dressed in the uniforms of the Ugandan national army and carrying stolen Ugandan weaponry, including machine guns, autocannons, mortars, and Soviet BM-21 multiple rocket launchers. According to RPF estimates, around 2,500 of the Ugandan Army's 4,000 Rwandan soldiers took part in the invasion, accompanied by 800 civilians, including medical staff and messengers. Both President Yoweri Museveni of Uganda and President Habyarimana of Rwanda were in New York City attending the United Nations World Summit for Children. In the first few days of fighting, the RPF advanced 60 km (37 mi) south to Gabiro. Their Rwandan Armed Forces opponents, fighting for Habyarimana's government, were numerically superior, with 5,200 soldiers, and possessed armoured cars and helicopters supplied by France, but the RPF benefited from the element of surprise. The Ugandan government set up roadblocks across the west of Uganda, to prevent further desertions and to block the rebels from returning to Uganda.

On 2 October the RPF leader Fred Rwigyema was shot in the head and killed. The exact circumstances of Rwigyema's death are disputed; the official line of Kagame's government, and the version mentioned by historian Gérard Prunier in his 1995 book on the subject, was that Rwigyema was killed by a stray bullet. In his 2009 book Africa's World War, Prunier says Rwigyema was killed by his subcommander Peter Bayingana, following an argument over tactics. According to this account, Rwigyema was conscious of the need to move slowly and attempt to win over the Hutu in Rwanda before assaulting Kigali, whereas Bayingana and fellow subcommander Chris Bunyenyezi wished to strike hard and fast, to achieve power as soon as possible. The argument boiled over, causing Bayingana to shoot Rwigyema dead. Another senior RPF officer, Stephen Nduguta, witnessed this shooting and informed President Museveni; Museveni sent his brother Salim Saleh to investigate, and Saleh ordered Bayingana's and Bunyenyezi's arrests and eventual executions.

When news of the RPF offensive broke, Habyarimana requested assistance from France in fighting the invasion. The French president's son, Jean-Christophe Mitterrand, was head of the government's Africa Cell and promised to send troops. On the night of 4 October, gunfire was heard in Kigali in a mysterious attack, which was attributed to RPF commandos. The attack was most likely staged by the Rwandan authorities, seeking to convince the French the regime was in imminent danger. (Note: Many sources report that the attack was staged: André Guichaoua also finds that the most convincing explanation, but writes that it remains open to debate.) As a result, 600 French soldiers arrived in Rwanda the following day, twice as many as initially pledged. The French operation was code-named Noroît and its official purpose was to protect French nationals. In reality the mission was to support Habyarimana's regime and the French parachute companies immediately set up positions blocking the RPF advance to the capital and Kigali International Airport. Belgium and Zaire also sent troops to Kigali in early October. The Belgian troops were deployed primarily to defend the country's citizens living in Rwanda but after a few days it became clear they were not in danger. Instead, the deployment created a political controversy as news reached Brussels of arbitrary arrests and massacres by the Habyarimana regime and its failure to deal with the underlying causes of the war. Faced with a growing domestic dispute over the issue, and with no obvious prospect of achieving peace, the Belgian government withdrew its troops by the beginning of November. Belgium provided no further military support to the Habyarimana government. Zairian President Mobutu Sese Seko's contribution was to send several hundred troops of the elite Special Presidential Division (DSP). Unlike the French, the Zairian troops went straight to the front line and began fighting the RPF, but their discipline was poor. The Zairian soldiers raped Rwandan civilians in the north of the country and looted their homes, prompting Habyarimana to expel them back to Zaire within a week of their arrival. With French assistance, and benefiting from the loss of RPF morale after Rwigyema's death, the Rwandan Army enjoyed a major tactical advantage. By the end of October they had regained all the ground taken by the RPF and pushed the rebels all the way back to the Ugandan border. Many soldiers deserted; some crossed back into Uganda and others went into hiding in the Akagera National Park. Habyarimana accused the Ugandan Government of supplying the RPF, establishing a "rear command" for the group in Kampala, and "flagging off" the invasion. The Rwandan Government announced on 30 October that the war was over.

The Rwandan Government used the attack on Kigali on 4 October as the pretext for the arbitrary arrest of more than 8,000 mostly Tutsi political opponents. Tutsi were increasingly viewed with suspicion; Radio Rwanda aired incitement to ethnic hatred and a pogrom was organised by local authorities on 11 October in the Kibilira commune of Gisenyi Province, killing 383 Tutsi. The burgomaster and the sous-préfet were dismissed from their posts and jailed, but released soon thereafter. It was the first time in nearly twenty years that massacres against Tutsi were perpetrated, as anti-Tutsi violence under the Habyarimana regime had been only low level up to that point.

=== Kagame's reorganisation of the RPF ===
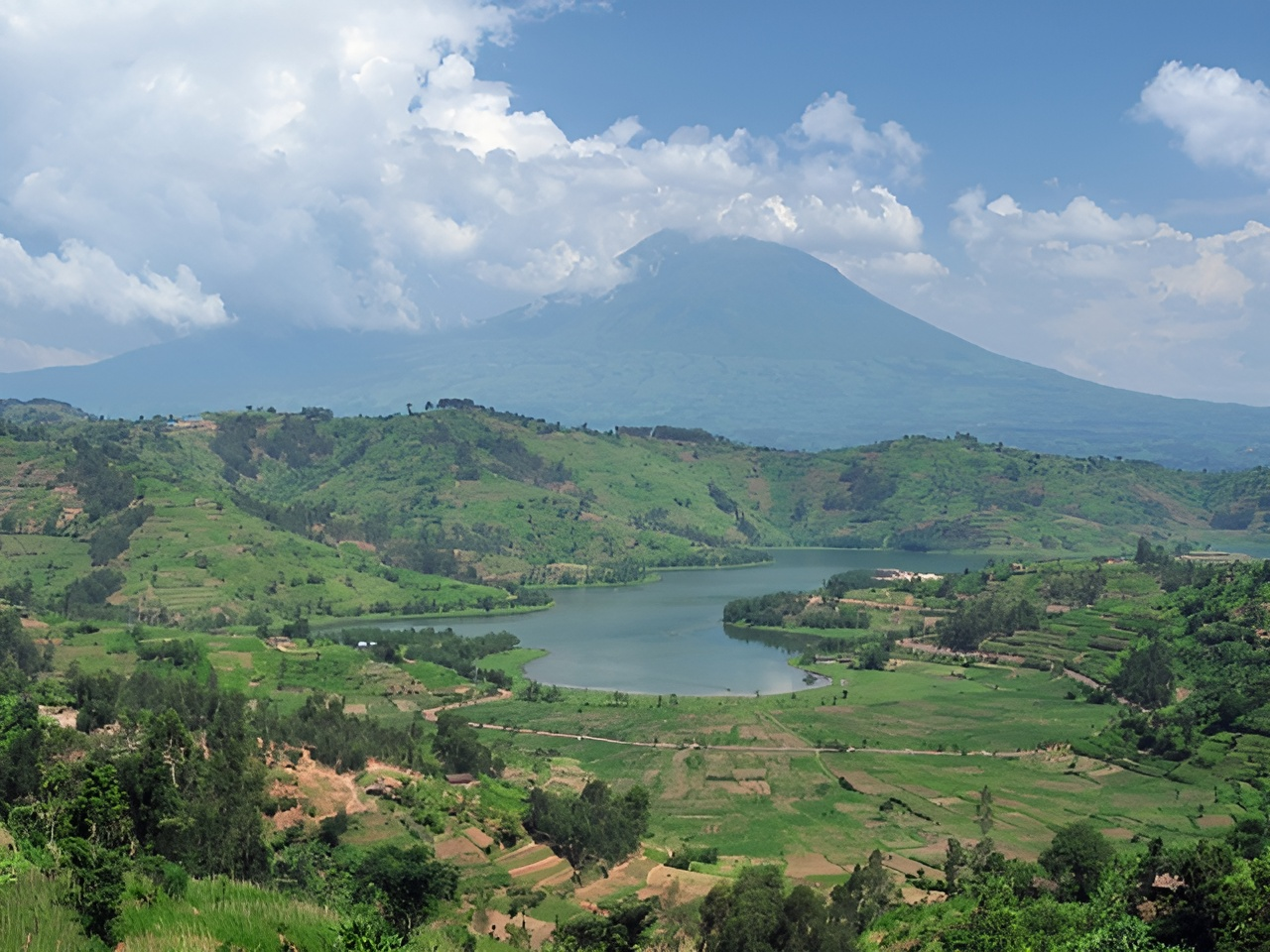
The Virunga Mountains, the RPF base from 1990 to 1991

Paul Kagame was still in the United States at the time of the outbreak of war, attending the military training course in Fort Leavenworth. He and Rwigyema had been in frequent contact by telephone throughout his stay in Kansas, planning the final details for the October invasion. At the end of September Kagame informed the college that he was leaving the course, and was settling his affairs ready to return to Africa as the invasion began. The college allowed him to leave with several textbooks, which he later used in planning tactics for the war. When Kagame learned of Rwigyema's death on 5 October, he departed immediately to take command of the RPF troops. He flew through London and Addis Ababa to Entebbe Airport, where he was given safe passage by a friend in the Ugandan secret service; the police considered arresting him, but with Museveni out of the country and no specific orders, they allowed him to pass. Ugandan associates drove Kagame to the border and he crossed into Rwanda early on 15 October.

The RPF were in disarray by the time Kagame arrived, with troop morale very low. He later described his arrival as one of the worst experiences of his life; the troops lacked organisation following Rwigyema's death and were demoralised after their losses in the war. Kagame was well known to the RPF troops, many of whom had fought with him in the Ugandan Army, and they welcomed his arrival in the field. He spent the following weeks gathering intelligence with senior officers. By the end of October, with the RPF forced back to the Ugandan border, Kagame decided it was futile to continue fighting. He therefore withdrew most of the army from north-eastern Rwanda, moving them to the Virunga Mountains, along the northwestern border. Kagame knew that the rugged terrain of the Virungas offered protection from attacks, even if the RPF's position was discovered. The march west took almost a week during which the soldiers crossed the border into Uganda several times, with the permission of President Museveni, taking advantage of personal friendships between the RPF soldiers and their ex-colleagues in the Ugandan Army.

Meanwhile, some RPF soldiers remained as a decoy to carry out small-scale attacks on the Rwandan Army, who remained unaware of the Front's relocation. The reorientation towards guerrilla warfare began with a raid on a Rwandan customs post across the border from Katuna. Following the attack, the Rwandan Government accused Uganda of deliberately sheltering the RPF. The RPF's new tactics inflicted heavy casualties on the Rwandan Army, which reacted by shelling Ugandan territory. Ugandan civilians were killed and a significant amount of damage to property was incurred, and there were reports of Rwandan troops crossing the border to loot and abduct locals.

Conditions in the Virungas were very harsh for the RPF. At an altitude of almost 5,000 metres (16,000 ft), there was no ready availability of food or supplies and, lacking warm clothing, several soldiers froze to death or lost limbs in the high-altitude cold climate. Kagame spent the next two months reorganising the army, without carrying out any military operations. Alexis Kanyarengwe, a Hutu colonel who had worked with Habyarimana but had fallen out with him and gone into exile, joined the RPF and was appointed chairman of the organisation. Another Hutu, Seth Sendashonga, became the RPF's liaison with Rwandan opposition parties. Most of the other senior recruits at the time were Ugandan-based Tutsi. Personnel numbers grew steadily, volunteers coming from the exile communities in Burundi, Zaire and other countries. Kagame maintained tight discipline in his army, enforcing a regimented training routine, as well as a large set of rules for soldier conduct. Soldiers were expected to pay for goods purchased in the community, refrain from alcohol and drugs, and to establish a good reputation for the RPF amongst the local population. The RPF punished personnel who broke these rules, sometimes with beatings, while more serious offences such as murder, rape, and desertion, were punishable by death.

The RPF carried out a major fundraising programme, spearheaded by Financial Commissioner Aloisia Inyumba in Kampala. They received donations from Tutsi exiles around the world, as well as from businessmen within Rwanda who had fallen out with the government. The sums involved were not enormous but, with tight financial discipline and a leadership willing to lead frugal lives, the RPF was able to grow its operational capability. It obtained its weapons and ammunition from a variety of sources, including the open market, taking advantage of a surplus of weaponry at the end of the Cold War. It is likely they also received weaponry from officers in the Ugandan Army; according to Gérard Prunier, Ugandans who had fought with Kagame in the Bush War remained loyal to him and secretly passed weaponry to the RPF. Museveni likely knew of this but was able to claim ignorance when dealing with the international community. Museveni later said that "faced with [a] fait accompli situation by our Rwandan brothers", Uganda went "to help the RPF, materially, so that they are not defeated because that would have been detrimental to the Tutsi people of Rwanda and would not have been good for Uganda's stability". Journalist Justus Muhanguzi Kampe reported that the taking of military equipment by deserted Tutsi members of the Ugandan Army meant the national arsenal "nearly got depleted"; he suspected the war "must have had a tremendous financial impact on the Ugandan government, especially Uganda's military budget", costing the country "trillions of shillings".

=== Attack on Ruhengeri, January 1991 ===
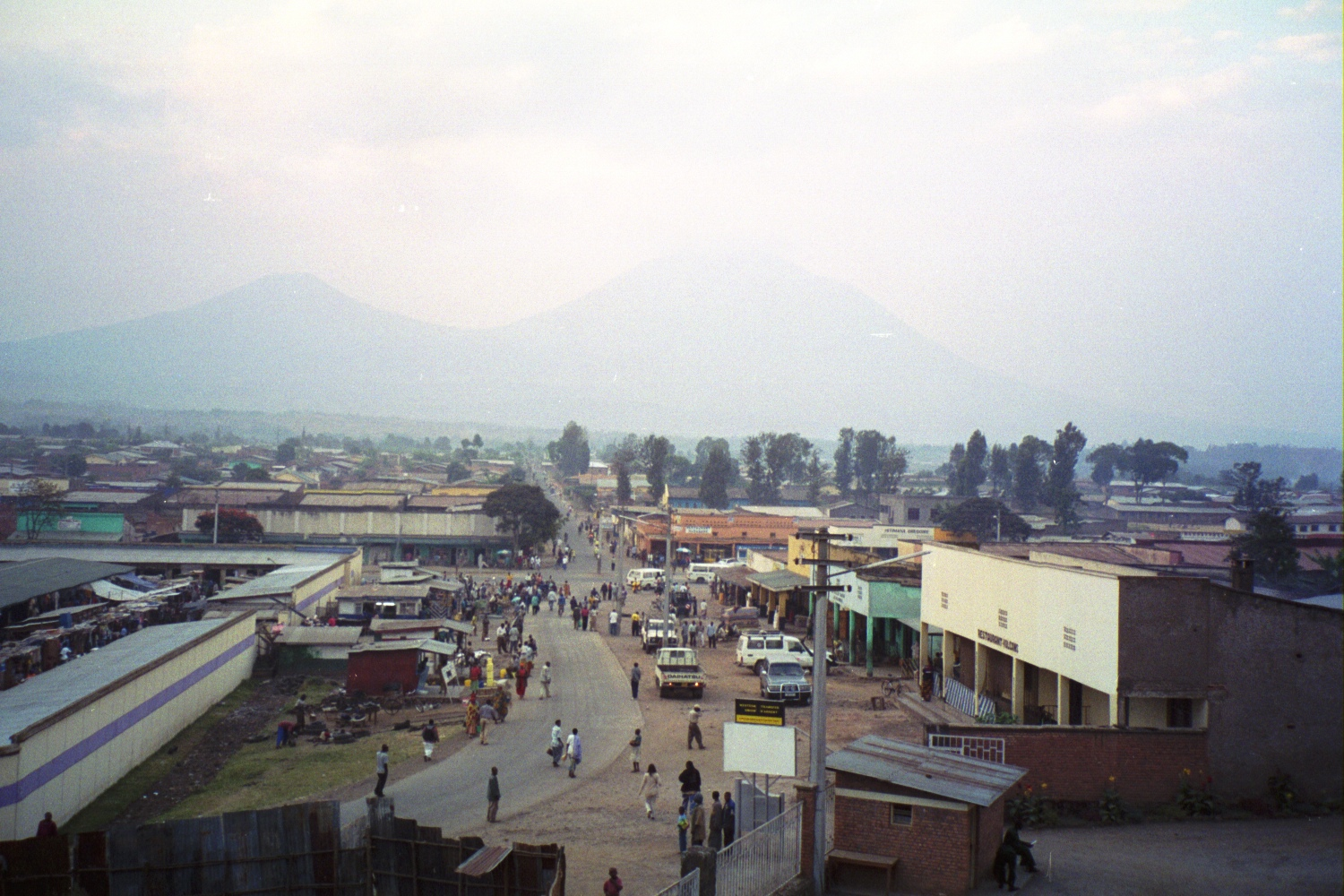
The town of Ruhengeri, with the Virunga Mountains in the background

After three months of regrouping, Kagame decided in January 1991 that the RPF was ready to fight again. The target for the first attack was the northern city of Ruhengeri, south of the Virunga mountains. The city was the only provincial capital that could be attacked quickly from the Virungas while maintaining an element of surprise. Kagame also favoured an attack on Ruhengeri for cultural reasons. President Habyarimana, as well as his wife and her powerful family, came from the north-west of Rwanda and most Rwandans regarded the region as the heartland of the regime. An attack there guaranteed the population would become aware of the RPF's presence and Kagame hoped this would destabilise the government.

During the night of 22 January, seven hundred RPF fighters descended from the mountains into hidden locations around the city, assisted by RPF sympathisers living in the area. They attacked on the morning of 23 January. The Rwandan forces were taken by surprise and were mostly unable to defend against the invasion. The Rwandan Police and army succeeded in briefly repelling the invasion in areas around their stations, killing large numbers of rebel fighters in the process. It is likely the Rwandan Army forces were assisted by French troops, as the French Government later rewarded around fifteen French paratroopers for having taken part in the rearguard. By noon, the defending forces were defeated and the RPF held the whole city. Most of the civilian population fled.

One of the principal RPF targets in Ruhengeri was the prison, which was Rwanda's largest. When he learnt of the invasion the warden, Charles Uwihoreye, telephoned the government in Kigali to request instructions. He spoke to Colonel Elie Sagatwa, one of the akazu, who ordered him to kill every inmate in the prison to avoid escape and defections during the fighting. He also wanted to prevent high-profile political prisoners and former insiders from sharing secret information with the RPF. Uwihoreye refused to obey, even after Sagatwa called him and repeated the order, having confirmed it with the president. Eventually, the RPF stormed the buildings and the prisoners were liberated. Several prisoners were recruited into the RPF, including Théoneste Lizinde, a former close ally of President Habyarimana, who had been arrested following a failed coup attempt in 1980.

The RPF forces held Ruhengeri through the afternoon of 23 January, before withdrawing into the mountains for the night. The raid undermined the Rwandan Government's claims that the RPF had been ejected from the country and had been reduced to conducting guerrilla operations from Uganda. The government sent troops to the city the following day and a state of emergency was declared, with strict curfews in Ruhengeri and the surrounding area. The RPF raided the city almost every night for several months, fighting with Rwandan army forces, and the country was back at war for the first time since the October invasion.

=== Guerrilla war, 1991–1992 ===
Following the action in Ruhengeri the RPF again began to wage guerrilla war. The Rwandan Army massed troops across the north of the country, occupying key positions and shelling RPF hideouts in the Virunga mountains, but the mountainous terrain prevented them from launching an all-out assault. Paul Kagame's troops attacked the Rwandan Army forces repeatedly and frequently, keen to ensure the diplomatic and psychological effect of the RPF's resurgence was not lost. Kagame employed tactics such as attacking simultaneously in up to ten locations across the north of the country, to prevent his opponents from concentrating their force in any one place. This low intensity war continued for many months, both sides launching successful attacks on the other, and neither able to gain the upper hand in the war. The RPF made some territorial gains including capturing the border town of Gatuna. This was significant as it blocked Rwanda's access to the port of Mombasa via the Northern Corridor, forcing all trade to go through Tanzania via the longer and costlier Central Corridor. By late 1991 the RPF controlled 5% of Rwanda, setting up its new headquarters in an abandoned tea factory near Mulindi, Byumba province. Many Hutu civilians in areas captured by the RPF fled to government-held areas, creating a large population of internally displaced persons in the country.

The renewed warfare had two effects in Rwanda. The first was a resurgence of violence against Tutsi still in the country. Hutu activists killed up to 1,000 Tutsi in attacks authorised by local officials, starting with the slaughter of 30–60 Bagogwe Tutsi pastoralists near Kinigi and then moving south and west to Ruhengeri and Gisenyi. These attacks continued until June 1991, when the government introduced measures to allow potential victims to move to safer areas such as Kigali. The akazu also began a major propaganda campaign, broadcasting and publishing material designed to persuade the Hutu population that the Tutsi were a separate and alien people, non-Christians seeking to re-establish the old Rwandan feudal monarchy with the final goal of enslaving the Hutu. This included the Hutu Ten Commandments, a set of "rules" published in the Kangura magazine, mandating Hutu supremacy in all aspects of Rwandan life. In response the RPF opened its own propaganda radio station, Radio Muhabura, which broadcast from Uganda into Rwanda. This was never hugely popular but gained listenership during 1992 and 1993.

The second development was that President Habyarimana announced that he was introducing multi-party politics into the country, following intense pressure from the international community, including his most loyal ally France. Habyarimana had originally promised this in mid-1990, and opposition groups had formed in the months since, including the Republican Democratic Movement (MDR), Social Democratic Party (PSD) and the Liberal Party (PL), but the one-party state law had remained in place. In mid-1991 Habyarimana officially allowed multi-party politics to begin, a change that saw a plethora of new parties come into existence. Many had manifestos which favoured full democracy and rapprochement with the RPF, but these were quite ineffective and had no political influence. The older opposition groups registered themselves as official parties and the country was notionally moving towards a multi-party inclusive cabinet with proper representation, but progress was continually hampered by the regime. The last opposition party to form was the Coalition for the Defence of the Republic (CDR), which was more hardline Hutu than Habyarimana's own party and had close links to the akazu.

Progress remained slow in 1991 and 1992. A cabinet set up in October 1991 contained almost no opposition, and the administrative hierarchy across the country recognised the authority of only Habyarimana's National Republican Movement for Democracy and Development party. Another one-party cabinet was announced in January 1992 which prompted large scale protests in Kigali, forcing Habyarimana to make real concessions. He announced his intention to negotiate with the RPF, and formed a multi-party cabinet in April. This was still dominated by Habyarimana's party, but with opposition figures in some key positions. The opposition members of this cabinet met with the RPF, and negotiated a ceasefire. In July 1992 the rebels agreed to stop fighting, and the parties began peace negotiations in the Tanzanian city of Arusha.

=== Peace process, 1992–1993 ===
The peace process was complicated by the fact that four distinct groups were involved, each with its own agenda. The Hutu hardliners, centred around the family of Agathe Habyarimana, were represented by the CDR as well as extremists within the president's own MRND party. The second group was the official opposition, which excluded the CDR. They had much more democratic and conciliatory aims but were also deeply suspicious of the RPF, whom they saw as trying to upset the "democratic" policy of Hutu rule established in the 1959 revolution. The third group was the RPF. Paul Kagame engaged with the peace process against the advice of some of his senior officers, in the knowledge that many of those on the other side of the table were hardliners who were not sincerely interested in negotiations. He feared that shunning the opportunity for peace would weaken the RPF politically and lose them international goodwill. Finally there was the group representing President Habyarimana himself, who sought primarily to hold on to his power in whatever form he could. This meant publicly striving for a middle ground compromise solution, but privately obstructing the process and trying to delay change to the status quo for as long as possible. Habyarimana recognised the danger posed to him by the radical Hutu faction and attempted in mid-1992 to remove them from senior army positions. This effort was only partially successful; akazu affiliates Augustin Ndindiliyimana and Théoneste Bagosora remained in influential posts, providing them with a link to power.

The delegates at the negotiations in Arusha made some progress in the latter half of 1992, despite wrangling between Habyarimana and hardline members of his party that compromised the government officials' negotiating power. In August the parties agreed to a "pluralistic transitional government", which would include the RPF. The CDR and hardline faction of the MRND reacted violently to this. Feeling sidelined by the developing Arusha process, they began killing Tutsi civilians in the Kibuye area; 85 were killed, and 500 homes burnt. Historian Gérard Prunier names late 1992 as the time when the idea of a genocidal "final solution" to kill every Tutsi in Rwanda was first mooted. Hardliners were busy setting up parallel institutions within the official organs of state, including the army, from which they hoped to effect a move away from the more conciliatory tone adopted by Habyarimana and the moderate opposition. Their goal was to take over from Habyarimana's government as the perceived source of power in the country amongst the Hutu masses, to maintain the line that the RPF and Tutsi more generally were a threat to Hutu freedoms, and to find a way to thwart any agreement negotiated in Arusha.

The situation deteriorated in early 1993 when the teams in Arusha signed a full power-sharing agreement, dividing government positions between the MRND, RPF and other major opposition parties, but excluding the CDR. This government was supposed to rule the country under a transitional constitution until free and fair elections could be held. The agreement reflected the balance of power at the time; Habyarimana, the mainstream opposition, and the RPF all accepted it, but the CDR and hardline MRND officers were violently opposed. MRND national secretary Mathieu Ngirumpatse announced that the party would not respect the agreement, contradicting the president and the party's negotiators in Arusha. The MRND hardliners organised demonstrations across the country and mobilised their supporters within the army and populace to begin a much larger killing spree than those that had previously occurred. The violence engulfed the whole north-west of Rwanda and lasted for six days; many houses were burned and hundreds of Tutsi killed.

=== RPF offensive, February 1993 ===
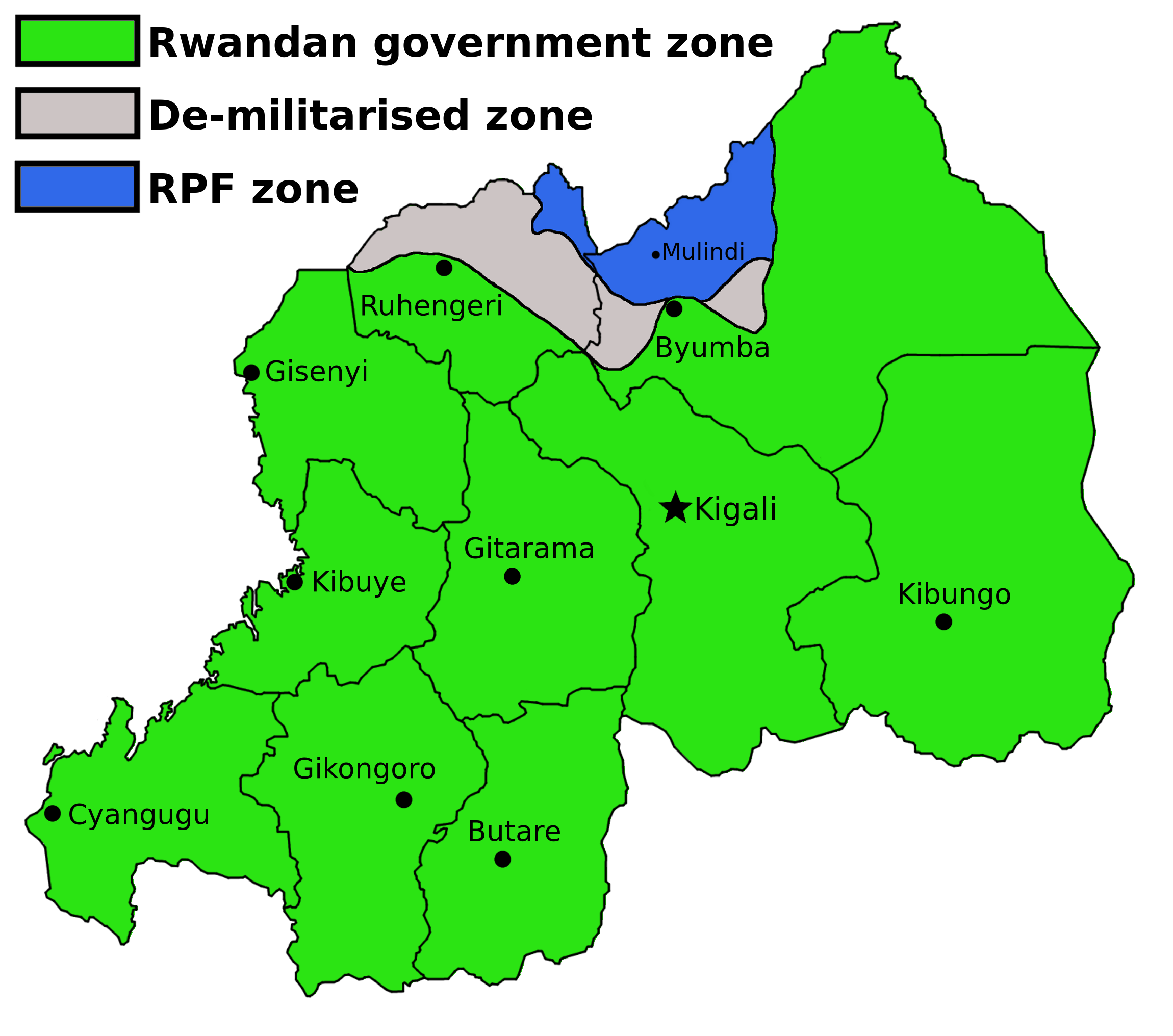
The partition of Rwanda following the RPF offensive in February 1993. For the first time, the Rwandan Government acknowledged that it had lost part of the country.

Paul Kagame responded by pulling out of the Arusha process and resuming the war, ending the six-month cease-fire. The RPF cited the CDR and MRND-hardliner violence as its reason for this, but according to foreign policy scholar Bruce D. Jones the offensive may actually have been intended primarily to increase the rebels' bargaining power at the peace talks. The next subject for the negotiations was the proportion of troops and officers to be allocated to each side in the new unified army. By demonstrating its military power in the field, through a successful offensive against the Rwandan Government forces, the RPF was able to secure an increased percentage of troops in the agreement.

The RPF began its offensive on 8 February, fighting southwards from the territory it already held in Rwanda's northern border regions. In contrast to the October 1990 and 1991–1992 campaigns, the RPF advance in 1993 was met by weak resistance from the Rwandan Army forces. The likely reason was a significant deterioration in morale and military experience within the government forces. The impact of the long-running war on the economy, and a heavy devaluation of the Rwandan franc, had left the government struggling to pay its soldiers regularly. The armed forces had also expanded rapidly, at one point growing from less than 10,000 troops to almost 30,000 in one-year. The new recruits were often poorly disciplined and not battle ready, with a tendency to get drunk and carry out abuse and rapes of civilians.

The RPF advance continued unchecked in February, its forces moving steadily south and gaining territory without opposition. They took Ruhengeri on the first day of fighting, and later the city of Byumba. Local Hutu civilians fled en masse from the areas the RPF were taking, most of them ending up in refugee camps on the outskirts of Kigali. The civilian cost of the offensive is unclear; according to André Guichaoua several thousand were killed, while Prunier labelled the RPF killing as "small-scale". This violence alienated the rebels from their potential allies in the democratic Rwandan opposition parties.

When it became clear that the Rwandan Army was losing ground to the RPF, Habyarimana requested urgent assistance from France. Fearing that the RPF could soon be in a position to seize Kigali, the French immediately dispatched 150 troops to Rwanda, along with arms and ammunition, to bolster the Rwandan Army forces. A further 250 French soldiers were sent on 20 February. The arrival of French troops in Kigali significantly changed the military situation on the ground. The RPF now found themselves under attack, French shells bombarding them as they advanced southwards.

By 20 February the RPF had advanced to within 30 km (19 mi) of the capital, Kigali, and many observers believed an assault on the city was imminent. The assault did not take place, and the RPF instead declared a cease-fire. Whether or not the RPF intended to advance on the capital is unknown. Kagame later said his aim at this point was to inflict as much damage as possible on Rwandan Army forces, capture their weapons, and gain ground slowly, but not to attack the capital or seek to end the war with an outright RPF victory. Kagame told journalist and author Stephen Kinzer such a victory would have ended international goodwill towards the RPF and led to charges that the war had simply been a bid to replace the Hutu state with a Tutsi one. The increased presence of French troops and the fierce loyalty of the Hutu population to the government meant an invasion of Kigali would not have been achieved with the same ease that the RPF had conquered the north. Fighting for the capital would have been a much more difficult and dangerous operation. Several of Kagame's senior officers urged him to go for outright victory but he overruled them. By the end of the February war more than a million civilians, mostly Hutu, had left their homes in the country's largest exodus to date.

=== Arusha Accords and rise of Hutu Power, 1993–1994 ===
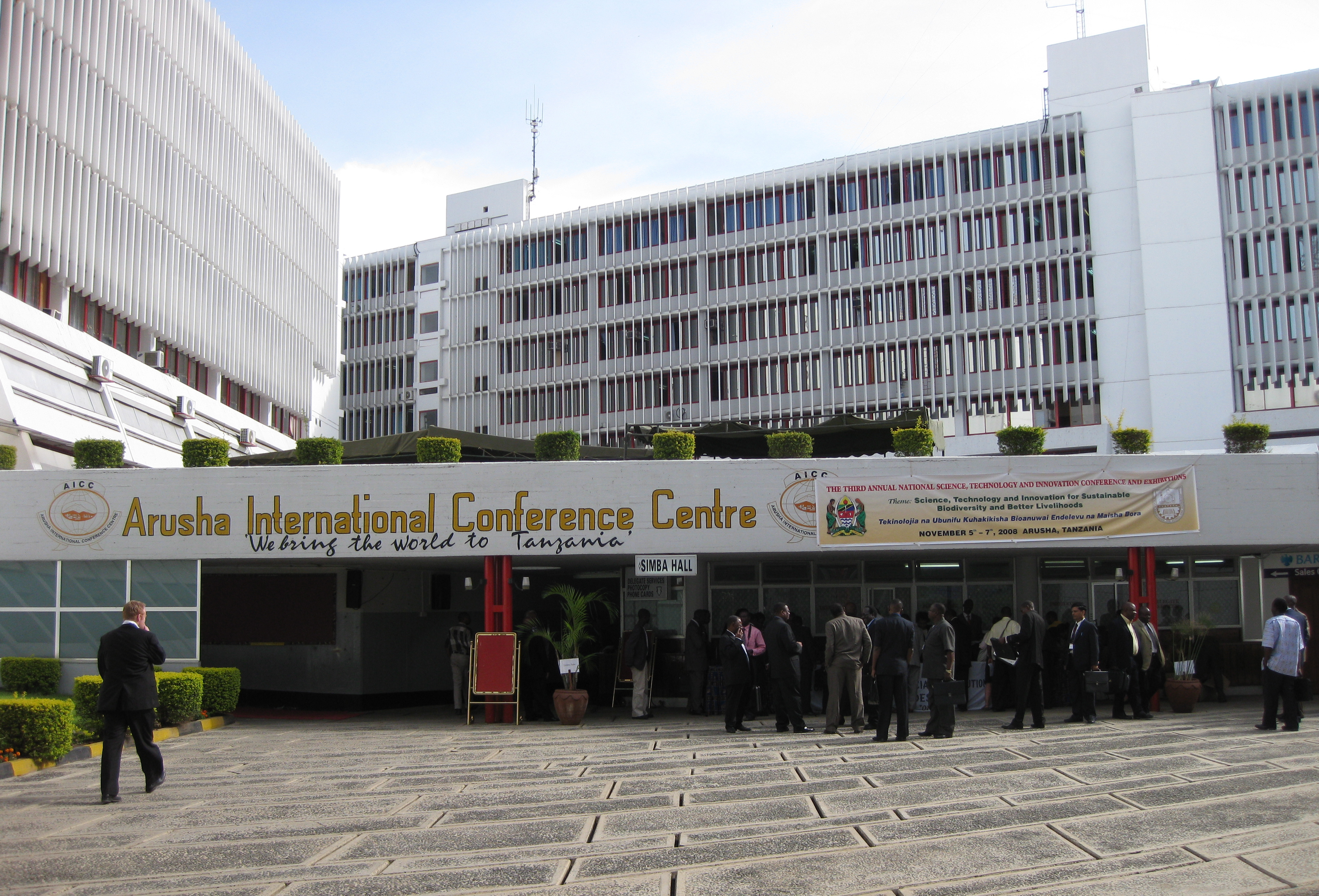
The Arusha International Conference Centre, venue for peace talks to end the war

The RPF cease-fire was followed by two days of negotiations in the Ugandan capital Kampala, attended by RPF leader Paul Kagame, and involving President Museveni and representatives of European nations. The Europeans insisted that RPF forces withdraw to the zone they had held before the February offensive. Kagame responded that he would agree to this only if the Rwandan army were forbidden from re-entering the newly conquered territory. Following a threat by Kagame to resume fighting and potentially take even more territory, the two sides reached a compromise deal. This entailed the RPF withdrawing to its pre-February territory, but also mandated the setting up of a demilitarised zone between the RPF area and the rest of the country. The deal was significant because it marked a formal concession by Habyarimana's regime of the northern zone to the rebels, recognising the RPF hold on that territory. There were many within the RPF senior command who felt Kagame had ceded too much, because the deal meant not only withdrawal to the pre-February boundaries, but also a promise not to encroach on the demilitarised zone. This therefore ended RPF ambitions of capturing more territory. Kagame used the authority he had accumulated through his successful leadership of the RPF to override these concerns, and the parties returned once more to the negotiating table in Arusha.

Despite the agreement and ongoing negotiations President Habyarimana, supported by the French Government, spent the subsequent months forging a "common front" against the RPF. This included members of his own party and the CDR and also factions from each of the other opposition parties in the power-sharing coalition. At the same time other members of the same parties issued a statement, in conjunction with the RPF, in which they condemned French involvement in the country and called for the Arusha process to be respected in full. The hardline factions within the parties became known as Hutu Power, a movement which transcended party politics. Apart from the CDR there was no party that was exclusively part of the Power movement. All major parties, save the Social Democrats, had "moderate" and "Power" wings, with members of both camps claiming to represent the legitimate leadership of that party. Even the ruling party contained a Power wing, consisting of those who opposed Habyarimana's intention to sign a peace deal. Several radical youth militia groups emerged, attached to the Power wings of the parties; these included the Interahamwe, which was attached to the MRND, and the CDR's Impuzamugambi. The youth militia began actively carrying out massacres across the country. The army trained the militias, sometimes in conjunction with the French, who were unaware the training they provided was being used to perpetrate the mass killings.

By June President Habyarimana had come to view Hutu Power, rather than the mainstream opposition, as the biggest threat to his leadership. This led him to change tactics and engage fully with the Arusha peace process, giving it the impetus it needed to draw to a completion. According to Prunier this support was more symbolic than genuine. Habyarimana believed he could maintain power more easily through a combination of limited concessions to the opposition and RPF than he could if Hutu Power were allowed to disrupt the peace process. The negotiation of troop numbers was protracted and difficult; twice the talks almost collapsed. The Rwandan Government wanted to allocate only 15% of the officer corps to the RPF, reflecting the proportion of Tutsi in the country, while the RPF was arguing for a 50/50 split. The RPF were in a superior position following their successful February campaign and were backed in their demands by Tanzania, which was chairing the talks. The government eventually agreed to their demands. As well as 50% of the officer corps, the RPF was allocated up to 40% of the non-command troops. The deal also mandated large-scale demobilisation; of the 35,000 Rwandan Army and 20,000 RPF soldiers at the time of the accords, only 19,000 would be drafted into the new national army. With all details agreed the Arusha Accords were finally signed on 4 August 1993 at a formal ceremony attended by President Habyarimana as well as heads of state from neighbouring countries.

An uneasy peace was once again entered into, which would last until 7 April of the following year. The agreement called for a United Nations peacekeeping force; this was titled the United Nations Assistance Mission for Rwanda (UNAMIR), and was in place in Rwanda by October 1993 under the command of Canadian General Roméo Dallaire. Another stipulation of the agreement was that the RPF would station diplomats in Kigali at the Conseil national de développement (CND), now known as the Chamber of Deputies, Rwanda's Parliament building. These men were protected by 600–1,000 RPF soldiers, who arrived in Kigali through UNAMIR's Operation Clean Corridor in December 1993. Meanwhile, the Hutu Power wings of the various parties were beginning plans for a genocide. The President of Burundi, Melchior Ndadaye, who had been elected in June as the country's first ever Hutu president, was assassinated by extremist Tutsi army officers in October 1993. The assassination reinforced the notion among Hutus that the Tutsi were their enemy and could not be trusted. The CDR and the Power wings of the other parties realised they could use this situation to their advantage. The idea of a "final solution", which had first been suggested in 1992 but had remained a fringe viewpoint, was now top of their agenda. An informant from the Interahamwe told UNAMIR officials a group of Hutu extremists were planning on disrupting the peace process and killing Tutsis in Kigali.

=== Military operations during the 1994 genocide ===

The cease-fire ended abruptly on 6 April 1994 when President Habyarimana's plane was shot down near Kigali Airport, killing both Habyarimana and the new President of Burundi, Cyprien Ntaryamira. The pair were returning home from a regional summit in Dar es Salaam at which the leaders of Kenya, Uganda, and Tanzania, had urged Habyarimana to stop delaying the implementation of the Arusha accords. The attackers remain unknown. Prunier, in his book written shortly after the incident, concluded that it was most likely a coup carried out by extreme Hutu members of Habyarimana's government. This theory was disputed in 2006 by French judge Jean-Louis Bruguière and in 2008 by Spanish judge Fernando Andreu. Both alleged that Kagame and the RPF were responsible. At the end of 2010 the judges succeeding Bruguière ordered a more thorough scientific examination, which employed experts in ballistics and acoustics. This report seemed to reaffirm the initial theory that Hutu extremists assassinated Habyarimana. But the report did not lead the judges to drop the charges against the RPF suspects; this was finally done in 2018, due to lack of evidence.

The shooting down of the plane served as the catalyst for the Rwandan genocide, which began within a few hours. A crisis committee was formed by the military, headed by Colonel Théoneste Bagosora, which refused to recognise Prime Minister Agathe Uwilingiyimana as leader, even though she was legally next in the line of political succession. UN commander General Dallaire labelled this a coup and insisted that Uwilingiyimana be placed in charge, but Bagosora refused. The Presidential Guard killed Uwilingiyimana and her husband during the night, along with ten Belgian UNAMIR soldiers charged with her protection and other prominent moderate politicians and journalists. The crisis committee appointed an interim government, still effectively controlled by Bagosora, which began ordering the systematic killing of huge numbers of Tutsi, as well as some politically moderate Hutu, through well-planned attacks. Over the course of approximately 100 days between 500,000 and 1,000,000 were killed.

On 7 April, as the genocide started, RPF commander Paul Kagame warned the interim government and the United Nations peacekeepers that he would resume the civil war if the killing did not stop. The next day Rwandan Army forces attacked the national parliament building from several directions but RPF troops stationed there successfully fought back. The RPF then crossed the demilitarised zone from their territory in the north and began an attack on three fronts, leaving their opponents unsure of their true intentions or whether an assault on Kigali was imminent. UNAMIR contingents in the demilitarised zone withdrew to their camps to avoid being caught in the fighting. Kagame refused to talk to the interim government, believing it was just a cover for Bagosora's rule and not committed to ending the genocide. Over the next few days the RPF moved steadily south through the eastern part of the country, capturing Gabiro and large areas of the countryside to the north and east of Kigali. Their unit stationed in Kigali was isolated from the rest of their forces but a unit of young soldiers successfully crossed government-held territory to link up with them. They avoided attacking Kigali or Byumba at this stage but conducted manoeuvres designed to encircle the cities and cut off supply routes. The RPF also allowed Tutsi refugees from Uganda to settle behind the front line in the RPF controlled areas.

In April there were numerous attempts by the United Nations forces to establish a cease-fire, but Kagame insisted each time that the RPF would not stop fighting unless the killings stopped. In late April the RPF secured the whole of the Tanzanian border area and began to move west from Kibungo, to the south of Kigali. They encountered little resistance except around Kigali and Ruhengeri. By 16 May they had cut the road between Kigali and Gitarama, the temporary home of the interim government, and by 13 June had taken Gitarama itself. The taking of Gitarama followed an unsuccessful attempt by the Rwandan Army forces to reopen the road. The interim government was forced to relocate to Gisenyi in the far north-west. As well as fighting the war Kagame recruited heavily at this time to expand the RPF. The new recruits included Tutsi survivors of the genocide and Rwandan Tutsi refugees who had been living in Burundi, but they were less well trained and disciplined than the earlier recruits.

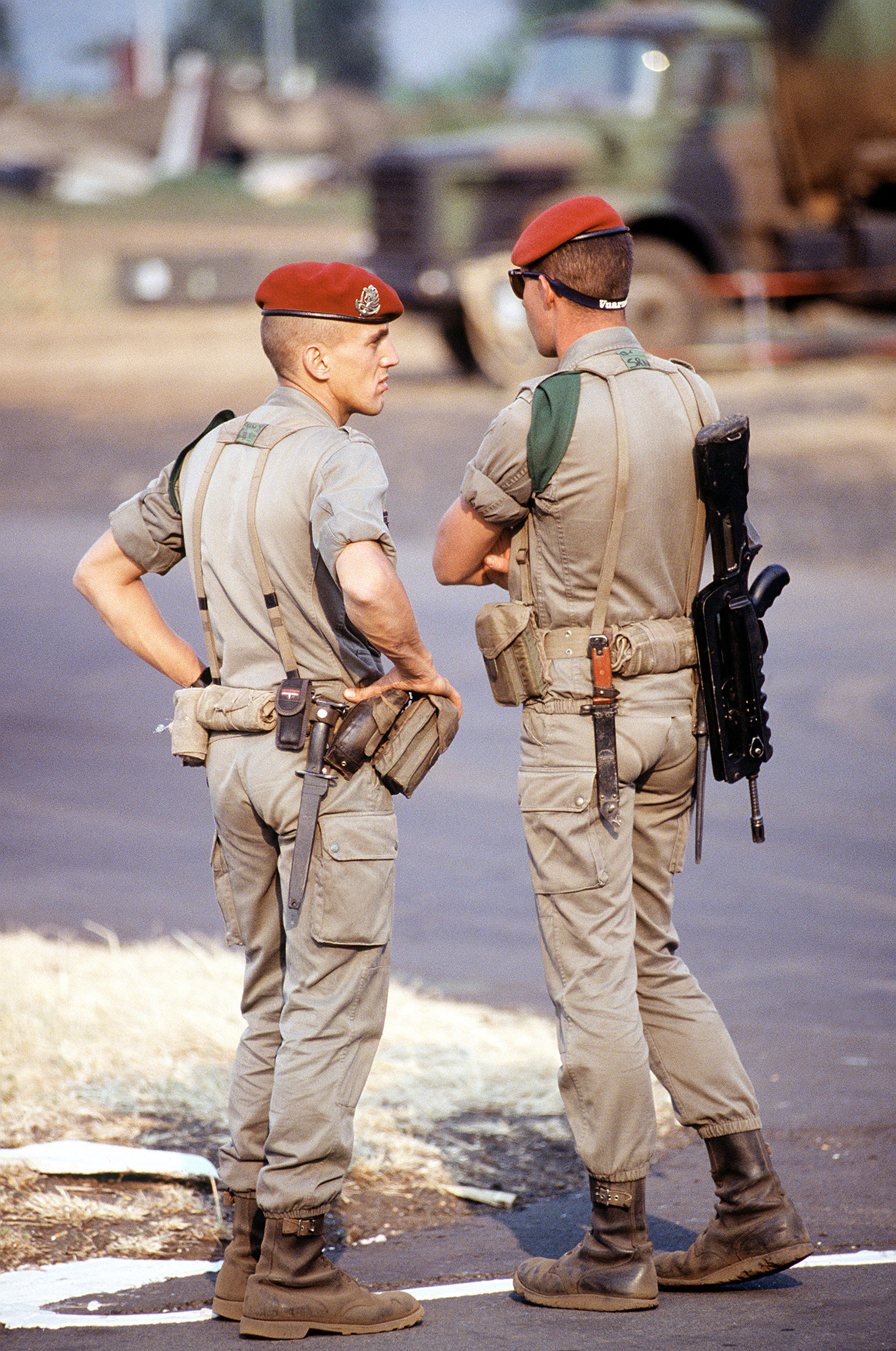
French soldiers in Kigali, August 1994

In late June 1994, France launched Opération Turquoise, a UN-mandated mission to create safe humanitarian areas for displaced persons, refugees, and civilians in danger. From bases in the Zairian cities of Goma and Bukavu, the French entered south-western Rwanda and established the Turquoise zone, within the Cyangugu–Kibuye–Gikongoro triangle, an area occupying approximately a fifth of Rwanda. Radio France International estimates that Turquoise saved around 15,000 lives, but with the genocide coming to an end and the RPF's ascendancy, many Rwandans interpreted Turquoise as a mission to protect the Hutus from the RPF, including some who had participated in the genocide. The French remained hostile to the RPF and their presence held up the RPF's advance in the south-west of the country. Opération Turquoise remained in Rwanda until 21 August 1994. French activity in Rwanda during the civil war later became a subject of much study and dispute, and generated an unprecedented debate about French foreign policy in Africa.

Having completed the encirclement of Kigali, the RPF spent the latter half of June fighting for the capital. The Rwandan Army forces had superior manpower and weapons, but the RPF steadily gained territory and conducted raids to rescue civilians from behind enemy lines. According to Dallaire, this success was due to Kagame's being a "master of psychological warfare"; he exploited the fact that the Rwandan Army were concentrating on the genocide rather than the fight for Kigali and exploited the government's loss of morale as it lost territory. The RPF finally defeated the Rwandan Army in Kigali on 4 July and on 18 July took Gisenyi and the rest of the north-west, forcing the interim government into Zaire. This RPF victory ended the genocide as well as the civil war. At the end of July 1994 Kagame's forces held the whole of Rwanda except for the Turquoise zone in the south-west. The date of the fall of Kigali, 4 July, was later designated Liberation Day by the RPF and is commemorated as a public holiday in Rwanda.

The UN peacekeeping force, UNAMIR, was in Rwanda during the genocide, but its Chapter VI mandate rendered it powerless to intervene militarily. Efforts by General Dallaire to broker peace were unsuccessful, and most of UNAMIR's Rwandan staff were killed in the early days of the genocide, severely limiting its ability to operate. Its most significant contribution was to provide refuge for thousands of Tutsi and moderate Hutu at its headquarters in Amahoro Stadium, as well as other secure UN sites, and to assist with the evacuation of foreign nationals. The Belgian Government, which had been one of the largest troop contributors to UNAMIR, pulled out in mid-April following the deaths of its ten soldiers protecting Prime Minister Uwilingiliyimana. In mid-May the UN conceded that "acts of genocide may have been committed", and agreed to reinforcement. The new soldiers started arriving in June, and following the end of the genocide in July they stayed to maintain security and stability, until the termination of their mission in 1996. Fifteen UN soldiers were killed in Rwanda between April and July 1994, including the ten Belgians, three Ghanaians, a Uruguayan, and Senegalese Mbaye Diagne who risked his life repeatedly to save Rwandans.

== Aftermath ==
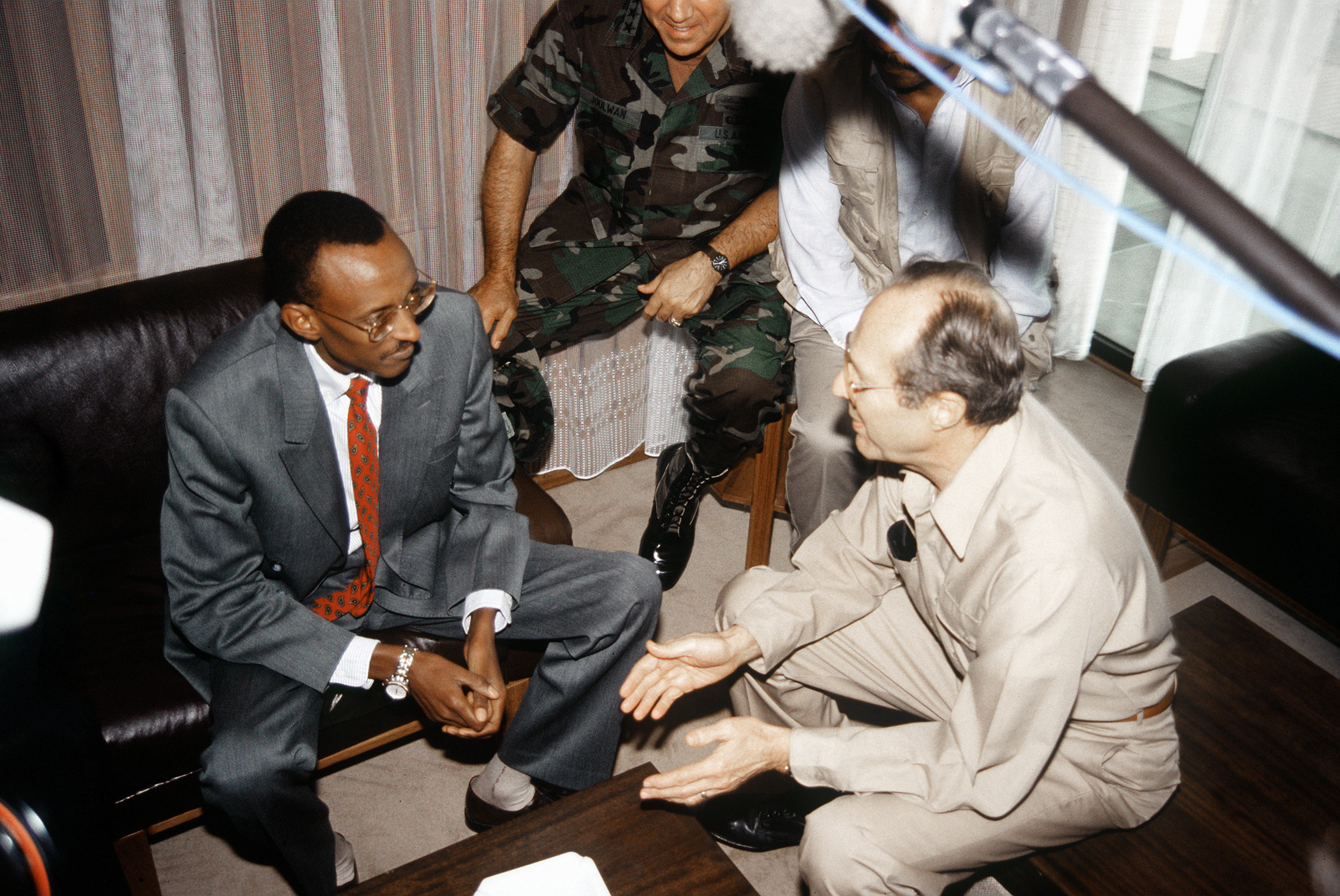
Vice president and de facto Rwandan leader Paul Kagame with United States Secretary of Defense William Perry in July 1994

The victorious RPF assumed control of Rwanda following the genocide, and as of 2026 remain the dominant political force in the country. They formed a government loosely based on the Arusha Accords, but Habyarimana's party was outlawed and the RPF took over the government positions allocated to it in the accords. The military wing of the RPF was renamed as the Rwandan Patriotic Army (RPA) and became the national army. Paul Kagame assumed the dual roles of Vice President of Rwanda and Minister of Defence; Pasteur Bizimungu, a Hutu who had been a civil servant under Habyarimana before fleeing to join the RPF, was appointed president. Bizimungu and his cabinet had some control over domestic affairs but Kagame remained commander-in-chief of the army and de facto ruler of the country.

=== Domestic situation ===
The civil war severely disrupted Rwanda's formal economy, bringing coffee and tea cultivation to a halt, decimating tourism, diminishing food production, and diverting government spending towards defence and away from other priorities. Rwanda's infrastructure and economy suffered further during the genocide. Many buildings were uninhabitable and the former regime had taken all currency and moveable assets when they fled the country. Human resources were severely depleted, with over 40% of the population having fled or been killed. Women constituted about 70 percent of the population, as many men had fled or been killed. Outside of civilian deaths, 7,500 combatants had been killed during the war. (Note: The Knight Ridder media company estimated based on news reports that the war had killed 2,000 people in total before the genocide began.) Many of the remainder were traumatised: most had lost relatives, witnessed killings, or participated in the genocide. The long-term effects of war rape included social isolation, sexually transmitted diseases and unwanted pregnancies and babies, some women resorting to self-induced abortions. The army, led by Paul Kagame, maintained law and order while the government began the work of rebuilding the country's institutions and infrastructure.

Non-governmental organisations began to move back into the country but the international community did not provide significant assistance to the new regime. Most international aid was routed to the refugee camps which had formed in Zaire following the exodus of Hutu from Rwanda. Kagame strove to portray the government as inclusive and not Tutsi-dominated. He directed removal of ethnicity from citizens' national identity cards and the government began a policy of downplaying the distinctions between Hutu, Tutsi, and Twa.

External videos
- Presentation by Stephen Kinzer on A Thousand Hills: Rwanda's Rebirth and the Man Who Dreamt It, June 18, 2008, C-SPAN

During the genocide and in the months following the RPF victory, RPF soldiers killed many people they accused of participating in or supporting the genocide. The scale, scope, and source of ultimate responsibility of these killings is disputed. Human Rights Watch, as well as scholars such as Prunier, allege that the death toll might be as high as 100,000, and that Kagame and the RPF elite either tolerated or organised the killings. In an interview with Stephen Kinzer, Kagame acknowledged that killings had occurred but said they were carried out by rogue soldiers and had been impossible to control. The killings gained international attention after the 1995 Kibeho massacre, in which soldiers opened fire on a camp for internally displaced persons in Butare Province. Australian soldiers serving as part of UNAMIR estimated at least 4,000 people were killed; the Rwandan Government claimed the death toll was 338.

Paul Kagame took over the presidency from Pasteur Bizimungu in 2000 and began a large-scale national development drive, launching a programme to develop Rwanda as a middle income country by 2020. The country began developing strongly on key indicators, including the human development index, health care, and education. Annual growth between 2004 and 2010 averaged 8% per year, the poverty rate reduced from 57% to 45% between 2006 and 2011, and life expectancy rose from 46.6 years in 2000 to 64.3 years in 2018. A period of reconciliation began as well as the establishment of courts for trying genocide suspects. These included the International Criminal Tribunal for Rwanda (ICTR) and Gacaca, a traditional village court system reintroduced to handle the large caseloads involved. As women represented a larger share of the post-war population were not as frequently implicated in the genocide, they were entrusted by the regime with more tasks of reconciliation and reconstruction.

=== Refugee crisis, insurgency, and Congo wars ===
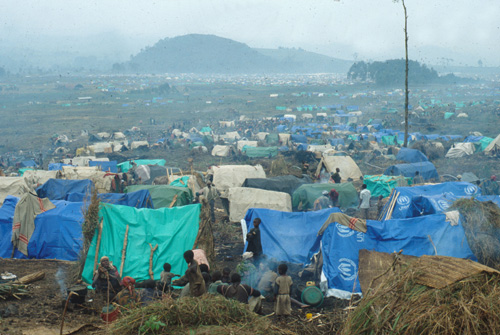
Refugee camp in Zaire, 1994

Following the RPF victory, approximately two million Hutu fled to refugee camps in neighbouring countries, particularly Zaire, fearing RPF reprisals for the Rwandan genocide. The camps were crowded and squalid and tens of thousands of refugees died in disease epidemics, including cholera and dysentery. They were set up by the United Nations High Commissioner for Refugees (UNHCR) but were effectively controlled by the army and government of the former Hutu regime, including many leaders of the genocide, who began to rearm in a bid to return to power in Rwanda.

By late 1996, Hutu militants from the camps were launching regular cross-border incursions and the RPF-led Rwandan Government launched a counter-offensive. Rwanda provided troops and military training to the Banyamulenge, a Tutsi group in the Zairian South Kivu province, helping them to defeat Zairian security forces. Rwandan forces, the Banyamulenge, and other Zairian Tutsi, then attacked the refugee camps, targeting the Hutu militia. These attacks caused hundreds of thousands of refugees to flee; many returned to Rwanda despite the presence of the RPF, while others ventured further west into Zaire. The refugees fleeing further into Zaire were relentlessly pursued by the RPA under the cover of the AFDL rebellion, killing an estimated 232,000 people. The defeated forces of the former regime continued a cross-border insurgency campaign, supported initially by the predominantly Hutu population of Rwanda's north-western provinces. By 1999 a programme of propaganda and Hutu integration into the national army succeeded in bringing the Hutu to the government side and the insurgency was defeated.

As well as dismantling the refugee camps, Kagame began planning a war to remove Mobutu. Mobutu had supported the genocidaires based in the camps and was also accused of allowing attacks on Tutsi people within Zaire. The Rwandan and Ugandan governments supported an alliance of four rebel groups headed by Laurent-Désiré Kabila, which began waging the First Congo War. The rebels quickly took control of North and South Kivu provinces and then advanced west, gaining territory from the poorly organised and demotivated Zairian army with little fighting. They controlled the whole country by May 1997. Mobutu fled into exile and the country was renamed the Democratic Republic of the Congo (DRC). Rwanda fell out with the new Congolese regime in 1998 and Kagame supported a fresh rebellion, leading to the Second Congo War. This lasted until 2003 and caused millions of deaths and severe damage. A 2010 United Nations report accused the Rwandan Patriotic Army of wide-scale human rights violations and crimes against humanity during the two Congo wars, charges denied by the Rwandan Government.

In 2015 the Rwandan government paid reparations to Uganda for damage inflicted during the civil war to its border regions.

== Sources ==
- Adelman, Howard; Suhrke, Astri (1999). The Path of a Genocide: The Rwanda Crisis from Uganda to Zaire (illustrated ed.). Oxford: Transaction Publishers. ISBN 978-1-41-283820-7. Archived from the original on 2020-08-30.
- Appiah, Anthony; Gates, Henry Louis (2010). Encyclopedia of Africa, Volume 1 (illustrated ed.). Oxford: Oxford University Press. ISBN 978-0-19-533770-9. Archived from the original on 2017-03-23.
- Associated Press (I) (7 April 1981). "Guerrillas Ambush Troops In Uganda". Observer–Reporter. Washington, Penn. Archived from the original on 18 June 2020.
- Australian War Memorial. "United Nations Assistance Mission for Rwanda (UNAMIR)". War history. Archived from the original on 2013-07-01.
- Bamurangirwa, Patricia (2013). Rwanda Yesterday. Leicester: Troubador Publishing Ltd. ISBN 978-1-78306-041-2. Archived from the original on 2017-02-22.
- BBC News (I) (12 January 2010). "Hutus 'killed Rwanda President Juvenal Habyarimana'". Archived from the original on 1 June 2013.
- BBC News (II). "Democratic Republic of Congo profile". Archived from the original on 10 October 2018.
- BBC News (III) (22 April 2000). "Rwanda's Kagame sworn in". Archived from the original on 1 August 2020.
- BBC News (IV) (10 January 2012). "Rwanda genocide: Kagame 'cleared of Habyarimana crash'". Archived from the original on 8 November 2018.
- BBC News (V) (17 September 2013). "Rwanda election: RPF wins parliamentary landslide". Archived from the original on 7 November 2018.
- BBC News (VI) (26 December 2018). "Rwanda genocide: Habyarimana plane shooting probe dropped". Archived from the original on 17 May 2020.
- Biles, Peter (4 October 1990). "Rwanda calls for aid to halt rebels". The Guardian. London. Archived from the original on 1 October 2018.
- Bonner, Raymond (7 September 1994). "Rwanda's Leaders Vow to Build a Multiparty State for Both Hutu and Tutsi". The New York Times. New York. Archived from the original on 30 March 2014.
- Bowcott, Owen (2 April 2014). "Rwanda genocide: the fight to bring the perpetrators to justice". The Guardian. London. Archived from the original on 20 February 2020.
- Brittain, Victoria (5 April 1999). "Rwanda makes its way to regeneration". The Guardian. London. Archived from the original on 6 May 2016.
- Bruguière, Jean-Louis (17 November 2006). "Report" (PDF). Paris Court of Serious Claims (in French). Archived from the original (PDF) on 16 December 2006.
- Byman, Daniel; Chalk, Peter; Hoffman, Bruce; Rosenau, William; Brannan, David (2001). Trends in Outside Support for Insurgent Movements. Rand Corporation. ISBN 978-0-8330-3232-4. Archived from the original on 2020-06-04.
- Carney, J.J. (2013). Rwanda Before the Genocide: Catholic Politics and Ethnic Discourse in the Late Colonial Era. Oxford: Oxford University Press. ISBN 978-0-19-998227-1. Archived from the original on 2017-02-22.
- Central Intelligence Agency (CIA) (I). "Rwanda". The World Factbook. Archived from the original on January 9, 2021.
- Chrétien, Jean-Pierre (2003). The Great Lakes of Africa: Two Thousand Years of History. Cambridge, Mass.: MIT Press. ISBN 978-1-890951-34-4. Archived from the original on 2016-05-08.
- Cunningham, David E. (2011). Barriers to Peace in Civil War. Cambridge University Press. ISBN 9781139499408. Archived from the original on 2020-08-30.
- Dallaire, Roméo (2003). Shake Hands with the Devil: The Failure of Humanity in Rwanda. London: Arrow. ISBN 978-0-09-947893-5. Archived from the original on 2016-05-05.
- Dash, Leon (2 December 1983). "Many Rwandan Refugees Moving North in Uganda to Escape Attacks". Washington Post. Archived from the original on 1 October 2018.
- de Brouwer, Anne-Marie L. M. (2005). Supranational Criminal Prosecution of Sexual Violence: The ICC and the Practice of the ICTY and the ICTR. Antwerp and Oxford: Intersentia. ISBN 978-90-5095-533-1.
- Des Forges, Alison (1999). Leave None to Tell the Story: Genocide in Rwanda (Report). New York, NY: Human Rights Watch. ISBN 1-56432-171-1. Archived from the original on 2019-02-18.
- Dorsey, Learthen (1994). Historical Dictionary of Rwanda. Metuchen, N.J.: Scarecrow Press. ISBN 978-0-8108-2820-9.
- Emizet, Kisangani N. F. (July 2000). "The Massacre of Refugees in Congo: A Case of UN Peacekeeping Failure and International Law". Journal of Modern African Studies. 38 (2): 163–202. doi:10.1017/S0022278X0000330X. JSTOR 161648. S2CID 154818651.
- "Juvénal Habyarimana". Encyclopaedia Britannica. Archived from the original on 19 January 2019.
- Fassbender, Bardo (2011). Securing Human Rights?: Achievements and Challenges of the UN Security Council. Oxford: Oxford University Press. ISBN 978-0-19-964149-9. Archived from the original on 2020-04-22.
- Gourevitch, Philip (2000). We Wish To Inform You That Tomorrow We Will Be Killed With Our Families (Reprint ed.). London; New York: Picador. ISBN 978-0-330-37120-9. Archived from the original on 2017-04-14.
- Government of Rwanda (2009). "Chronology of Events Leading to Liberation". Official Website of the Government of Rwanda. Archived from the original on 7 March 2012.
- Guichaoua, André (2015). From War to Genocide: Criminal Politics in Rwanda, 1990–1994. University of Wisconsin Press. ISBN 9780299298203.
- Henley, Jon (31 October 2007). "Scar tissue". The Guardian. London. Archived from the original on 1 September 2013.
- Human Rights Watch (27 February 1992). Rwanda: Talking peace and waging war, human rights since the October 1990 invasion (PDF). Vol. IV, Issue No. 3.
- ITMB Publishing. Rwanda & Burundi (Map) (4th Revised ed.). Richmond, B.C.: ITMB Publishing. ISBN 978-1-55341-382-0. Archived from the original on 2016-12-20.
- Jones, Bruce D. (2001). Peacemaking in Rwanda: The Dynamics of Failure. Lynne Rienner Publishers. ISBN 978-1-5558-7994-5. Archived from the original on 2016-12-24.
- King, David C. (2007). Rwanda (Cultures of the World). New York: Benchmark Books. ISBN 978-0-7614-2333-1. Archived from the original on 2016-06-17.
- Kinzer, Stephen (2008). A Thousand Hills: Rwanda's Rebirth and the Man Who Dreamed it (Hardcover ed.). Hoboken, N.J.: John Wiley & Sons. ISBN 978-0-470-12015-6. Archived from the original on 2014-06-10.
- Kroslak, Daniela (2007). The role of France in the Rwandan genocide. London: Hurst & Co. ISBN 978-1-85065-882-5. Archived from the original on 2020-08-30.
- Kuperman, Alan J. (2001). The limits of humanitarian intervention: Genocide in Rwanda. Washington: Brookings Institution Press. ISBN 978-0-8157-0086-9. Archived from the original on 2020-08-30.
- Legum, Colin, ed. (1994). Africa Contemporary Record 1992–1994. Vol. XXIV. New York: Africana Publishing Company. ISBN 978-0841905627.
- Longman, Timothy (2017). Memory and Justice in Post-Genocide Rwanda. Cambridge University Press. ISBN 9781107678095. Archived from the original on 2020-08-30.
- Lorch, Donatella (25 April 1995). "Mood Grim at Camp in Rwanda". The New York Times. New York. Archived from the original on 10 August 2012.
- Lott, Gaia (July 2018). "On the margins of the Françafrique: Franco-Burundian and Franco-Rwandan bonds from an historical perspective". African Affairs. 117 (468): 347–369. doi:10.1093/afraf/ady013.
- Mamdani, Mahmood (2002). When Victims Become Killers: Colonialism, Nativism, and the Genocide in Rwanda. Princeton, N.J.: Princeton University Press. ISBN 978-0-691-10280-1. Archived from the original on 2016-06-24.
- Mayersen, Deborah (2010). ""Race" relations in Rwanda: An historical perspective". University of Wollongong Research Online. Archived from the original on 27 November 2018.
- McGreal, Chris (11 January 2007). "France's shame?". The Guardian. London. Archived from the original on 4 October 2018.
- McGreal, Chris (18 December 2008). "Rwanda's Himmler: the man behind the genocide". The Guardian. London. Archived from the original on 4 October 2018.
- McGreal, Chris (1 October 2010). "Delayed UN report links Rwanda to Congo genocide". The Guardian. London. Archived from the original on 30 August 2018.
- Melvern, Linda (2000). A people betrayed: the role of the West in Rwanda's genocide (8, illustrated, reprint ed.). London; New York: Zed Books. ISBN 978-1-85649-831-9. Archived from the original on 2014-06-29.
- Melvern, Linda (2004). Conspiracy to Murder: The Rwandan Genocide. London and New York, NY: Verso. ISBN 978-1-85984-588-2.
- Ministry of Public Service and Labour, Republic of Rwanda (MINFOTRA) (30 June 2015). "Official Gazette no Special bis of 30/06/2015" (PDF). Archived (PDF) from the original on 12 July 2018.
- Muhanguzi Kampe, Justus (2016). Eyes of a Journalist. Kampala: World of Inspiration. ISBN 9789970050185.
- Murdock, Deroy (13 December 2010). "Rwanda's Economic Miracle". National Review. Archived from the original on 11 February 2017.
- National Assembly of France (15 December 1998). "Report of the Information Mission on Rwanda" (in French). Section 4: L'Attentat du 6 Avril 1994 Contre L'Avion du Président Juvénal Habyarimana. Archived from the original on 5 June 2011.
- National Institute of Statistics of Rwanda (February 2012). "The third Integrated Household Living Conditions Survey (EICV 3) – Main indicators Report" (PDF). Archived from the original (PDF) on 20 November 2015.
- Newbury, Catharine (1988). The Cohesion of Oppression: Clientship and Ethnicity in Rwanda, 1860–1960. New York: Columbia University Press. ISBN 978-0-231-06257-2. Archived from the original on 2017-02-22.
- Nganda, Ssemujju Ibrahim (6 August 2009). "WHO FOUGHT: Kagame helped Museveni crush internal NRA revolt". The Observer. Kampala. Archived from the original on 2014-03-20.
- Park, Chang-Hwan (6 April 2020). "Revisiting the Rwandan Genocide". The Argus.
- Public Broadcasting Service (PBS). "100 days of Slaughter: A Chronology of U.S./U.N. Actions". PBS. Archived from the original on 5 August 2007.
- Pomfret, John (9 July 1997). "Rwandans Led Revolt in Congo". Washington Post. Archived from the original on 30 October 2015.
- Pottier, Johan (2002). Re-Imagining Rwanda: Conflict, Survival and Disinformation in the Late Twentieth Century. Cambridge: Cambridge University Press. ISBN 978-0-5215-2873-3. Archived from the original on 2020-08-11.
- Power, Samantha. "A Problem from Hell": America and the Age of Genocide (2002) pp. 329–90; Pulitzer Prize.online free to borrow Archived 2019-04-21 at the Wayback Machine
- Prunier, Gérard (1999). The Rwanda Crisis: History of a Genocide (2nd ed.). Kampala: Fountain Publishers Limited. ISBN 978-9970-02-089-8. Archived from the original on 2014-04-16.
- Prunier, Gérard (2009). Africa's World War : Congo, the Rwandan Genocide, and the Making of a Continental Catastrophe: Congo, the Rwandan Genocide, and the Making of a Continental Catastrophe. Oxford: Oxford University Press. ISBN 978-0-19-970583-2. Archived from the original on 2013-11-04.
- Radio France International (RFI) (10 April 2014). "Twenty years after genocide France and Rwanda give different versions of history". Archived from the original on 4 March 2016.
- Reyntjens, Filip (2013). Political Governance in Post-Genocide Rwanda. Cambridge: Cambridge University Press. ISBN 978-1-107-67879-8.
- Reyntjens, Filip (21 October 2014). "Rwanda's Untold Story. A reply to '38 scholars, scientists, researchers, journalists and historians'". African Arguments. Archived from the original on 25 July 2018.
- Rucyahana, John (2007). The Bishop of Rwanda. Nashville, Tenn.: Thomas Nelson. ISBN 978-0-84-990052-5.
- Rwanda – The preventable genocide: The Report of International Panel of Eminent Personalities to Investigate the 1994 Genocide in Rwanda and Surrounding Events (IPEP) (PDF). Addis Ababa: Organisation of African Unity. 2000. Archived from the original (PDF) on 8 September 2015.
- Sabar, Ariel (27 March 2013). "A King With No Country". Washingtonian. Washington, D.C. Archived from the original on 18 July 2018.
- Shyaka, Anastase (1 July 2004). "The Rwandan Conflict: Origin, Development, Exit Strategies" (PDF). National Unity and Reconciliation Commission, Republic of Rwanda. Archived (PDF) from the original on 3 May 2019.
- Siddique, AK (September–October 1994). "Cholera epidemic among Rwandan refugees: experience of ICDDR,B in Goma, Zaire". Glimpse. 16 (5): 3–4. PMID 12288419.
- Simpson (I), Chris (14 November 2000). "Kagame: Quiet soldier who runs Rwanda". BBC News. London. Archived from the original on 21 August 2017.
- Twagilimana, Aimable (2007). Historical Dictionary of Rwanda. Metuchen, N.J.: Scarecrow Press. ISBN 978-0-8108-6426-9. Archived from the original on 2020-08-30.
- United Nations (September 1996). "Rwanda-UNAMIR Background". Archived from the original on 23 October 2018.
- United Nations Development Programme (UNDP) (2013). "Human Development Report 2013: Rwanda" (PDF). Archived (PDF) from the original on 18 October 2018.
- United Nations High Commissioner for Refugees (UNHCR) (2000). "Ch. 10: The Rwandan genocide and its aftermath" (PDF). State of the World's Refugees 2000. Archived (PDF) from the original on 25 September 2007.
- United States Holocaust Memorial Museum (6 January 2011). "Rwanda". Holocaust Encyclopedia. Archived from the original on 5 August 2011.
- Wallis, Andrew (2006). Silent Accomplice: The Untold Story of France's Role in the Rwandan Genocide. London: I.B.Tauris. ISBN 978-1-84511-247-9. Archived from the original on 2020-05-31.
- Wells, Mike; Fellows, Nick (2016). History for the IB Diploma Paper 1 Conflict and Intervention. Cambridge: Cambridge University Press. ISBN 978-1-1075-6096-3. Archived from the original on 2020-08-30.
- Wilkinson, Tracy (7 February 2008). "Spain indicts 40 Rwandan officers". Los Angeles Times. Los Angeles, Calif. Archived from the original on 28 December 2013.
