= Linda Melvern =

British journalist

Linda Melvern is a British investigative journalist. Early in her career, she worked for The Evening Standard and then The Sunday Times (UK), including on the investigative Insight Team. Since leaving the newspaper she has written seven books of non-fiction. She is a former Honorary Professor of the University of Wales, Aberystwyth, in the Department of International Politics.

== Career ==
In her early career, Melvern concentrated on a variety of subjects. Her first book, “Techno-Bandits”, was co-authored with Nick Anning and David Hedbitch in 1984, and told the story of the US Department of Defense's attempts to prevent the Soviet Union from acquiring American technology. Her next book - her first solo exploit - investigated Rupert Murdoch's campaign against the British print unions in order to use a more modern printing plant in Wapping. The book, entitled “The End of the Street”, was published in 1986 by Methuen.

In the 1990s, her focus shifted somewhat to the United Nations - starting with The Ultimate Crime (Allison and Busby, 1995) - an investigation into the secret aspects of the first 50 years of UN history. The book became the basis of a TV series for Channel Four, the three-part UN Blues broadcast in January 1995.

For much of the past twenty years, Melvern work has concentrated on the circumstances of the 1994 genocide in Rwanda. She was the second vice-President of the International Association of Genocide Scholars. Melvern was a consultant to the Military One prosecution team at the International Criminal Tribunal for Rwanda (ICTR), and a part of her archive of documents on the planning and preparation of the genocide form a part of the documentary evidence used by the prosecution in this trial. In 2017, Rwandan President Paul Kagame presented Melvern with the Igihango National Order of Outstanding Friendship.

== Critical responses ==
Her first book on the genocide, A People Betrayed, was mostly met with warm praise from scholars and other experts. The book covered the inaction of the United Nations and the international community during the genocide. Canadian academic Gerard Caplan called it a "good, solid book", while former ICTR Prosecutor Teree Bowers hailed it as a "riveting, comprehensive overview".

Conspiracy to Murder was also generally well-received. In general, scholars praised Melvern on the depth of her research. Political Scientist Nicolas van de Walle called the account "authoritative", though it had "shortcomings" relating to its scope. Scott Straus, another prominent expert on Africa and Rwanda, had a similar analysis, arguing that while "the book's depiction of the genocide, does not depart from the now-standard portrayal", it adds value by "presenting fresh new details, anecdotes, and evidence".

In 2020, Verso published her book Intent to Deceive: Denying the Genocide of the Tutsi - undoubtedly her most controversial work. Alex Russell published a favorable review of the book in Financial Times, calling it a "clear, crisp and important contribution to the literature on the genocide". Roméo Dallaire, force commander of UNAMIR during the events of 1994, also endorsed the book in The Globe and Mail, praising how it highlighted how "individuals with everything to lose ... manipulate[d] the next generation into revisionists and genocide deniers. These duped academics, journalists and other “experts” continue to propagate self-serving lies onto the victims.

In a critical review of the book, Belgian scholar Filip Reyntjens, who is criticised several times in the book, writes that Melvern suffers from confirmation bias, selective use of sources, factual errors, and overtly favoring the RPF. He also states,

A conversation on facts and their interpretation becomes impossible when false accusations are levelled against participants, for instance, by branding them as genocide deniers, merely because they have a different reading of events. Throughout the book, several scholars and other writers, including the author of this review, are accused of denial, although they unambiguously acknowledge the historical fact that the Rwandan Tutsi have been the victims of genocide.

In the same review, Reyntjens describes her as one of the "staunch defenders of the ruling Rwandan Patriotic Front". However, Reyntjens also writes that the book is well written and "offers interesting and at times novel insights into a number of events". Susan Thomson also criticized the book, stating that it is "a regurgitation of the government line, rooted in a selective reading of history". She states that Melvern fails to distinguish between actual genocide denial and non-adherence to the version of history preferred by the RPF, as well as ignoring the RPF's use of laws against "genocide denial" to target critics.

== Books ==
- Techno-Bandits: How the Soviets are Stealing America’s High-Tech Future - with Nick Anning and David Hebditch (1984) ISBN 978-0395360668
- The End of the Street: The Story of Rupert Murdoch’s Coup Against the British Press (1986) ISBN 978-0413146403
- The Ultimate Crime: Who Betrayed the UN and Why (1995) ISBN 978-0850319392
- A People Betrayed: The Role of the West in Rwanda's Genocide (2000) ISBN 978-1856498302
- World Organizations: United Nations (2001) ISBN 978-0531148143
- Conspiracy to Murder: The Rwandan Genocide (2004) ISBN 978-1859845882
- Intent to Deceive: Denying the Genocide of the Tutsi (2020) ISBN 978-1788733281
