= Luc Reydams =

Political science professor

Luc Reydams is a scholar of political science and international law who teaches at University of Notre Dame.

== Works ==
- Reydams, Luc (2004). Universal Jurisdiction: International and Municipal Legal Perspectives. Oxford University Press. ISBN 978-0-19-927426-0.
