= Filip Reyntjens =

Belgian political scientist, university teacher and jurist

Filip Reyntjens (born 1952) is professor emeritus at University of Antwerp. His academic training is in constitutional law, but he later pivoted towards the study of politics especially of the Great Lakes region of Africa.

== Career ==
In 1975, while working as a research assistant at the University of Antwerp, Reyntjens was asked to be involved in a project that involved running a law school at the National University of Rwanda, in Butare. This began a long affiliation with Rwanda. His PhD Thesis: 'Power and Law in Rwanda. Public Law and Political Evolution, 1916-1973' (Original French: Pouvoir et droit au Rwanda. Droit public et évolution politique, 1916-1973), was completed in 1983, and later published as a book in 1985. After this, his research widened from Rwanda to the Great Lakes Region as a whole - publishing work on Burundi and on the Democratic Republic of Congo.

Outside of academia, Reyntjens has been called as an expert witness in cases relating to the Great Lakes region in the courts of multiple nations, as well as before the International Criminal Court and the International Criminal Tribunal for Rwanda. He has also volunteered for Amnesty International.

== Selected works ==
- Reyntjens, Filip (1994). L'Afrique des grands lacs en crise. Paris: Karthala. ISBN 9782865375080.
- Reyntjens, Filip (1995). Rwanda: trois jours qui ont fait basculer l'histoire. Brussels: Institut Africain.
- Reyntjens, Filip (2009). The Great African War: Congo and Regional Geopolitics, 1996-2006. Cambridge University Press. ISBN 978-0-521-11128-7.
- Reyntjens, Filip (2013). Political Governance in Post-Genocide Rwanda. Cambridge University Press. ISBN 978-1-107-04355-8.
- Reyntjens, Filip (2017). Le génocide des Tutsi au Rwanda. Que sais-je (in French). Vol. 4062. Presses universitaires de France. ISBN 978-2-13-079582-7.
