= List of wars involving Burundi =

This is a list of wars and conflicts involving Burundi and its previous states.

== List ==
Conflict	Combatant 1	Combatant 2	Result	Head of State	Losses
Martyazo Rebellion (1972)	Burundi	Martyazo	Victory: Start of the First Burundian Genocide.	Michel Micombero	800–1200
Burundian Civil War (1993–2005)	Burundi: Armed forces; Guardians of the Peace; "Abajeunes"; Supported by: RPF (Rwanda) International peacekeepers: AMIB (2003–04); ONUB (from 2004)	Ethnic Hutu rebels: CNDD-FDD; PALIPEHUTU-FNL (Note: The PALIPEHUTU-FNL split into several factions in course of the civil war. The political and militant wings of the party separated in 1999, while the militant wing subsequently divided into FNL-Kabura, FNL-Rwasa, and FNL-Icanzo. Most of the FNL signed a peace agreement with the Burundian government in May 2005, but several dissident elements of the FNL continued to fight until 2009.); FROLINA; Hutu militias and youth gangs: Inziraguhemuka; Intagoheka; "Chicago Bulls"; ALiR; FDLR; Mai-Mai; Supported by: Zaire (until 1996); Tanzania; DR Congo (2000s): Tutsi militants: Burundian military factions; Sans Echec; Sans Défaite; Sans Pitié; Sans Capote; Imbogaraburundi; PA-Amasekanya; Supported by: RPF (Rwanda)	Arusha Accords (2000)	Several	300,000
First Congo War (1996-1997)	(Democratic Republic of the Congo) AFDL; Rwanda; Uganda; Burundi; Angola (South Sudan) SPLA; Eritrea; Supported by: South Africa; Zambia; Zimbabwe; Ethiopia; Tanzania; United States (covertly) Mai-Mai (Note: Many Mai-Mai militias in eastern Zaire initially allied themselves with Rwanda and the AFDL against Hutu militants and refugees. As soon as most Hutu were driven away, however, many Mai-Mai groups turned against Rwanda and the AFDL. Despite this, some anti-Hutu Mai-Mai remained allied with Rwanda and the AFDL.)	Zaire: FAZ; White Legion; Sudan; Chad (Rwanda) Ex-FAR/ALiR; Interahamwe; CNDD-FDD; UNITA; ADF; FLNC; LRA; UNRF II; Supported by: France; Central African Republic; China; Israel; Kuwait (denied) Mai-Mai	AFDL victory: Overthrow of the Mobutu regime; Zaire renamed back to the Democratic Republic of the Congo; Installation of Laurent-Désiré Kabila as president; Beginning of Second Congo War	Pierre Buyoya	Unknown
Kivu Conflict (2004–)	Pro-government: DR Congo; (Democratic Republic of the Congo) Wazalendo (March 2024–); NDC-R; Burundi; (United Nations) MONUSCO; Angola; Zimbabwe; Botswana (against FNL and FNL–Nzabampema); Supported by: France; Belgium; Bulgaria; Horațiu Potra's Mercenary Legion (until 31 Jan 2025)	Rwandan-aligned militias: CNDP; M23; Banyamulenge; Twigwaneho; Gumino; Ugandan-aligned militias: FPRI; FPLC; FPDC; Foreign state actors: Uganda; Rwanda; Anti-Ugandan forces: IS-CAP; ADF-Baluku; ADF-Mukulu; Mai-Mai Kyandenga; UPLC; Anti-Rwandan militias: FDLR; RUD-Urunana; Other Hutu-aligned forces; Nyatura; Anti-Burundi militias: RED-Tabara; FNL; Mai-Mai militias: NDC-R (until March 2024); FPP-AP; AFRC; RNL; Mazembe; Kifuafua; Simba; MAC; Raia Mutomboki; Buhirwa; Kidjangala; Fuliru Mai-Mai; Makanaki; Biloze Bishambuke; CNPSC; Alaise; CODECO (in Ituri); Chini ya Kilima–FPIC (in Ituri); (Zaire) Zaïre-FPAC (in Ituri)	Ongoing: FARDC victory against the CNDP in 2009 and the M23 movement in 2012; CNDP becomes a political party in the DRC; M23 movement signs peace agreement with the DRC government; renews fighting in 2022; Conflict breaks out between Rwanda and the Congo in 2022; FDLR, Mai-Mai militias and other armed groups still active in Eastern DRC; UN and FARDC begin operation to defeat the FDLR and their allies at the start of 2015	Pierre Nkurunziza Évariste Ndayishimiye	Unknown
Somali Civil War (2007–)	2007–2009: Insurgency: Ethiopia; (Somalia) TFG; Puntland; Galmudug; Supported by: Malawi; United States; AMISOM: Burundi; Djibouti; Ethiopia; Ghana; Kenya; Nigeria; Sierra Leone; Uganda; Allied armed groups: (Somalia) ARPCT; ASWJ; (United Nations) UNPOS 2009–present: Somalia; Somali Armed Forces; Regional forces: (Somalia) Ma'awisley; Galmudug; Galmudug Security Force; Ahlu Sunna Waljama'a (until 2018); Himan and Heeb (until 2015); Hirshabelle; Khatumo; Southwestern Somalia; United States: U.S. Army; U.S. Marine Corps; U.S. Air Force; U.S. Navy; CIA; AFRICOM; China: People's Armed Police; AUSSOM (2025–present): Burundi (under discussion); Djibouti; Egypt (under discussion); Ethiopia; Kenya; Uganda; ATMIS (2022–2024): Burundi; Djibouti; Ethiopia; Kenya; Uganda; AMISOM (2007–2022): Burundi; Djibouti; Ethiopia; Ghana; Kenya; Nigeria; Sierra Leone; Uganda; Allies: France; Italy; Russia; Turkey; United Arab Emirates; United Kingdom; Non-combat support: European Union; EUTM Somalia; (United Nations) UNPOS (1995–2013) (United Nations) UNSOM (2013–2024): Brazil; Finland; Germany; Ghana; India; Indonesia; Nepal; Sierra Leone; Sweden; Thailand; Turkey; Uganda; United Kingdom; Zimbabwe; (United Nations) UNTMIS (2025–present) (United Nations) UNSOA (2009–2016) (United Nations) UNSOS (2016–present) Independent regional forces Puntland: Puntland Security Force; Puntland Dervish Force; Puntland Maritime Police Force; Jubaland: Jubaland Dervish Force; Raskamboni Movement	2007–2009: Insurgency: Al-Shabaab; ICU loyalists Hizbul Islam; Ras Kamboni Brigades; Jabhatul Islamiya; Muaskar Anole (Somalia) ARS 2006–2009: Somaliland 2009–present: Al-Qaeda and allies; Al-Shabaab; AQAP; AQIM; Hizbul Islam (until 2010; 2012–2013) Alleged state allies: Eritrea: Iran; Quds Force; Qatar; Alleged non-state allies: Houthis; Somali pirates: Islamic State (since 2015); Somalia Wilayah; Allies; IS-YP; Somali pirates 2009–present: Somaliland; Somaliland Armed Forces; SSB; Alleged support: Ethiopia; UAE; United Kingdom; Yemen; European Union	Ongoing: Conflict between radical Islamists and the government continues; New government formed in 2012; Las Anod conflict between Somaliland and SSC-Khatumo begins in 2023; Ongoing constitutional crisis in Somalia since 2023	Pierre Nkurunziza Évariste Ndayishimiye	Unknown

== Sources ==
- Lansford, Tom (2017). Political Handbook of the World 2016-2017. Volume 1. London: CQ Press. ISBN 9781506327150.
- Ngaruko, Floribert; Nkurunziza, Janvier D. (2005). "Civil War and Its Duration in Burundi". In Paul Collier; Nicholas Sambanis (eds.). Understanding Civil War: Africa. Evidence and Analysis. Washington, D.C.: World Bank. pp. 35–62. ISBN 978-0-8213-6047-7.
- Plaut, Martin (2016). Understanding Eritrea: Inside Africa's Most Repressive State. Oxford: Oxford University Press. ISBN 978-0-19-066959-1.
- Prunier, Gérard (July 2004). "Rebel Movements and Proxy Warfare: Uganda, Sudan and the Congo (1986-99)". African Affairs. 103 (412): 359–383. doi:10.1093/afraf/adh050. JSTOR 3518562.
- Prunier, Gérard (2009). Africa's World War: Congo, the Rwandan Genocide, and the Making of a Continental Catastrophe. Oxford: Oxford University Press. ISBN 978-0-19-970583-2.
- Reyntjens, Filip (2009). The Great African War: Congo and Regional Geopolitics, 1996-2006. Cambridge University Press. ISBN 978-0-521-11128-7.
