= List of wars: 1990–1999 =

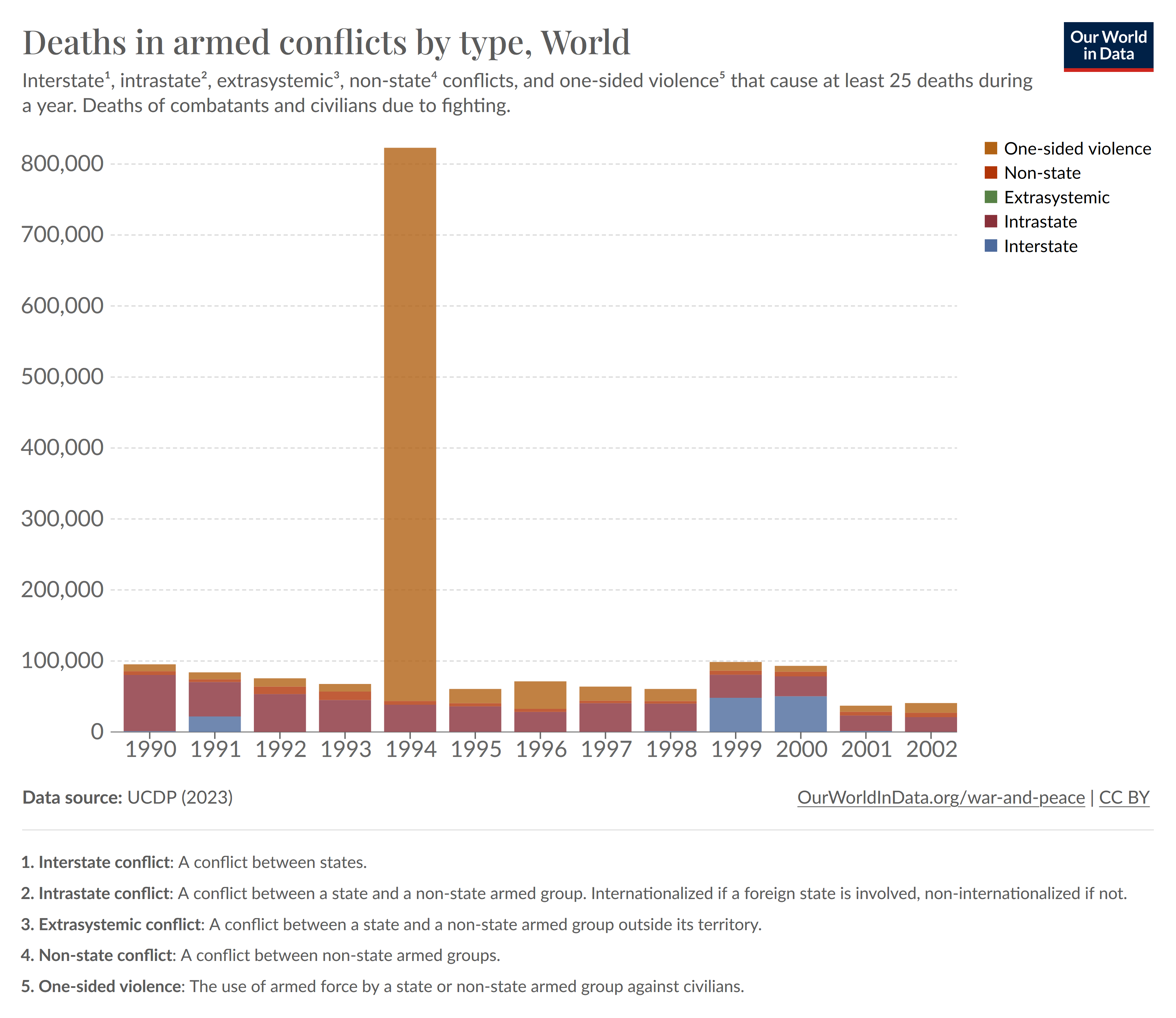
Graph of conflict deaths from 1990 to 2002. The spike of one-sided violence in 1994 is mostly due to the Rwandan genocide.

This is a list of wars that began between 1990 and 1999. Other wars can be found in the historical lists of wars and the list of wars extended by diplomatic irregularity.

| Started | Ended | Name of Conflict | Belligerents | |
| Started | Ended | Name of Conflict | Victorious party (if applicable) | Defeated party (if applicable) |
|---|---|---|---|---|
| 1990 | Ongoing | DHKP/C insurgency in Turkey | Government of Turkey: Turkish Armed Forces; Turkish Land Forces; Turkish Air Force; Turkish Naval Forces; Turkish Gendarmerie; JİTEM; Special Forces Command; General Directorate of Security; Riot Police; Police Special Operation Department; Ministry of Foreign Affairs; National Defense; Ministry of the Interior | DHKP/C; TKP/ML; MLKP; Communist Party of Turkey (Workers Voice) Supported by: Syria (Until 2024) |
| 1990 | 1995 | Eelam War II Part of the Sri Lankan Civil War | Sri Lanka | Liberation Tigers of Tamil Eelam |
| 1990 | 1991 | Gulf War; Part of the Arab Cold War | United States; United Kingdom; France; Saudi Arabia; Egypt; Kuwait; (United Nations) Coalition: Afghan mujahideen; Argentina; Australia; Bahrain; Bangladesh; Belgium; Canada; Czechoslovakia; Denmark; Germany; Greece; Honduras; Hungary; Italy; Japan; Luxembourg; Morocco; Netherlands; New Zealand; Niger; Norway; Oman; Pakistan; Philippines; Poland; Portugal; Qatar; Romania; Senegal; Sierra Leone; Singapore; South Korea; Spain; Sweden; Syria; Turkey; United Arab Emirates | Iraq |
| 1990 | 1994 | Rwandan Civil War | Rwandan Patriotic Front (RPF) | Rwanda; Zaire (1990); France |
| 1990 | 1990 | 1990 Mindanao crisis Part of the 1986–90 Philippine coup attempts | Philippines | Federal Republic of Mindanao |
| 1990 | 1992 | Transnistria War; Part of the dissolution of the Soviet Union and the Transnistria conflict | Transnistria; Russia; Supported by: Ukraine | /Moldova (Note: Soviet Socialist Republic of Moldova until 23 May 1991. Constituent republic of the Soviet Union until 27 August 1991.) Supported by: Romania |
| 1990 | 1995 | Tuareg rebellion (1990–1995); Part of the Tuareg rebellions | Niger; Mali; Ganda Koy | Mali: Arab Islamic Front of Azawad (FIAA), Popular Movement for the Liberation of Azawad (MPLA), United Movements and Fronts of Azawad (MFUA). Niger: Front for the Liberation of Aïr and Azaouak (FLAA), Front for the Liberation of Tamoust, (FLT), CRA & ORA coalitions (1994–95) |
| 1991 | 1992 | 1991–1992 South Ossetia War; Part of the Georgian–Ossetian conflict, Georgian Civil War, and Dissolution of the Soviet Union | South Ossetia; Russia; (1992) | (Georgia (country)) Georgia |
| 1981/1988/1991 (disputed) | Ongoing | Somali Civil War; Part of the Conflicts in the Horn of Africa, The Ethiopian-Somali conflict, War against the Islamic State, Operation Enduring Freedom – Horn of Africa, and Global War on Terrorism | 1980s–1991: (Somalia) Somali Democratic Republic; SNA (until 1991); Supported by: Djibouti; Italy; Libya; Saudi Arabia; South Africa; United States; 1991–1995: United Nations (United Nations) UNOSOM I: Australia; Austria; Belgium; Botswana; Canada; Czechia; Egypt; Fiji; Finland; Indonesia; Jordan; Morocco; New Zealand; Norway; Pakistan; Zimbabwe; (United Nations) UNITAF: Australia; Bangladesh; Belgium; Botswana; Canada; Egypt; Ethiopia; France; Germany; Greece; India; Indonesia; Italy; Kuwait; Malaysia; Morocco; New Zealand; Nigeria; Norway; Pakistan; Saudi Arabia; Spain; Tunisia; Turkey; UAE; United Kingdom; United States; Zimbabwe; (United Nations) UNOSOM II: Algeria; Australia; Austria; Bangladesh; Belgium; Botswana; Canada; Denmark; Egypt; Fiji; Finland; France; Germany; Greece; India; Indonesia; Ireland; Italy; Jordan; Kuwait; Malaysia; Morocco; Nepal; New Zealand; Nigeria; Norway; Pakistan; Philippines; Romania; Saudi Arabia; South Korea; Spain; Sweden; Switzerland; Tunisia; Turkey; United Arab Emirates; United Kingdom; United States; Zimbabwe; 1995–2006: (Somalia) Interim Government; (Somalia) TNG; (Somalia) ARPCT; (Somalia) USC; JVA; RRA; Galmudug; Jubaland; Puntland; (United Nations) UNPOS 2006–2009: Invasion: Ethiopia; (Somalia) TFG; United States Supported by: Kenya; Insurgency: Ethiopia; (Somalia) TFG; Puntland; Galmudug; Supported by: Malawi; United States; IGASOM: Djibouti; Eritrea; Ethiopia; Kenya; Sudan; Uganda; AMISOM: Burundi; Djibouti; Ethiopia; Ghana; Kenya; Nigeria; Sierra Leone; Uganda; Allied armed groups: (Somalia) ARPCT; ASWJ; (United Nations) UNPOS 2009–present: Somalia; Somali Armed Forces; Regional forces: (Somalia) Ma'awisley; Galmudug; Galmudug Security Force; Ahlu Sunna Waljama'a (until 2018); Himan and Heeb (until 2015); Hirshabelle; Khatumo; Southwestern Somalia; United States: U.S. Army; U.S. Marine Corps; U.S. Air Force; U.S. Navy; CIA; AFRICOM; China: People's Armed Police; AUSSOM (2025–present): Burundi (under discussion); Djibouti; Egypt (under discussion); Ethiopia; Kenya; Uganda; ATMIS (2022–2024): Burundi; Djibouti; Ethiopia; Kenya; Uganda; AMISOM (2007–2022): Burundi; Djibouti; Ethiopia; Ghana; Kenya; Nigeria; Sierra Leone; Uganda; Allies: France; Italy; Russia; Turkey; United Arab Emirates; United Kingdom; Non-combat support: European Union; EUTM Somalia; (United Nations) UNPOS (1995–2013) (United Nations) UNSOM (2013–2024): Brazil; Finland; Germany; Ghana; India; Indonesia; Nepal; Sierra Leone; Sweden; Thailand; Turkey; Uganda; United Kingdom; Zimbabwe; UNTMIS (2025–present); UNSOA (2009–2016); UNSOS (2016–present) Independent regional forces Puntland: Puntland Security Force; Puntland Dervish Force; Puntland Maritime Police Force; Jubaland: Jubaland Dervish Force; Raskamboni Movement | 1980s–1991: Armed rebel groups; (Somalia) USC; SSDF; SPM; Supported by: Ethiopia: 1980s–1991: Somali National Movement; Supported by: Ethiopia; 1991–1995: (Somalia) USC (Somalia) SNA; Al-Itihaad 1995–2006: (Somalia) SRRC; (Somalia) SNA; SPM-Harti; Islamic Courts Union 1995–2006: Somaliland 2006–2009: Invasion: Islamic Courts Union; Supported by: Eritrea; ONLF; Insurgency: Al-Shabaab; ICU loyalists; Hizbul Islam; Ras Kamboni Brigades; Jabhatul Islamiya; Muaskar Anole; (Somalia) ARS; 2006–2009: Somaliland 2009–present: Al-Qaeda and allies; Al-Shabaab; AQAP; AQIM; Hizbul Islam (until 2010; 2012–2013) Alleged state allies: Eritrea: Iran; Quds Force; Qatar; Alleged non-state allies: Houthis; Somali pirates: Islamic State (since 2015); Somalia Wilayah; Allies; IS-YP; Somali pirates 2009–present: Somaliland; Somaliland Armed Forces; SSB; Alleged support: Ethiopia; UAE |
| 1991 | 1991 | Operation Traíra; Part of the Colombian conflict and war on drugs | Brazil: Brazilian Army; Brazilian Air Force; Brazilian Navy; Colombia: Colombian Army | FARC: Comando Simón Bolívar |
| 1991 | 1991 | 1991 Iraqi uprisings Part of the aftermath of the Gulf War | Ba'athist Iraq: Ba'ath Party; (Iraq) Iraqi Army; Republican Guard; Special Republican Guard; Popular Army; General Security; Intelligence Service; Special Security; Support: MEK | Shia and leftist elements of opposition: SCIRI/Badr Brigades; Dawa; Communist Party; (Iraq) Pro-Syrian Ba'athists; (Iraq) Army deserters/defectors; Kurdish rebels: Peshmerga: KDP; PUK; IMK; CPK; (Iraq) Jash deserters/defectors; PDKI; Diplomatic Support: United States; Military Support Iran |
| 1991 | 2002 | Sierra Leone Civil War; Part of the spillover of the First and Second Liberian Civil Wars | Sierra Leone; SLA (before and after the AFRC); CDF (Kamajors, Tamaboros, Kapras, etc.); Foreign mercenaries; United Kingdom (2000–2002); Guinea; ECOMOG forces (1998–2000); Executive Outcomes (1995–1996); Supported by: United States; Belarus; (United Nations) UNAMSIL; Bangladesh; India; Pakistan (2001–2005); Kenya; Russia (1999–2005); Ukraine (1999–2005); Nigeria; Norway; New Zealand; Ghana; Jordan; Germany | RUF; (Sierra Leone) AFRC (1997–2002); West Side Boys (1998–2000); Liberia (1997–2002); NPFL (1991–2002); Foreign mercenaries; Supported by: Libya; Burkina Faso |
| 1991 | 1995 | Croatian War of Independence Part of the Yugoslav Wars | 1991–94: Croatia; 1994–95: Croatia; Bosnia and Herzegovina | 1991–92: (Socialist Federal Republic of Yugoslavia) SFR Yugoslavia; SAO Krajina; SAO Eastern Slavonia, Baranja and Western Syrmia; SAO Western Slavonia; 1992–95: Serbian Krajina; Republika Srpska |
| 1991 | 1991 | Ten-Day War; Part of the Yugoslav Wars | Slovenia | Yugoslavia |
| 1991 | 1991 | 1991 Soviet coup d'état attempt Part of the Cold War, the Revolutions of 1989, and the dissolution of the Soviet Union | Presidency of the Soviet Union Russian SFSR: Supreme Soviet; Congress of People's Deputies; Council of Ministers; Supporting republics: Armenia; Estonia; Georgia; Kazakhstan; Kyrgyzstan; Latvia; Lithuania; Moldova; Nakhichevan; Ukraine Russian nationalists (Russian Soviet Federative Socialist Republic) Russian liberals (Russian Soviet Federative Socialist Republic) Anti-coup and pro-Yeltsin demonstrators and organizations (Democratic Russia); Armenian Revolutionary Federation; Popular Front of Azerbaijan (Belarus) Belarusian Popular Front; All-National Congress of the Chechen People; People's Movement of Ukraine; UNA–UNSO (Lithuania) Sąjūdis Diplomatic support: Australia; Bulgaria; Canada; Czechoslovakia; Denmark; (European Union) EEC; France; Germany; Holy See; Hungary; Israel; Italy; Japan; Mongolia; NATO; New Zealand; Poland; Romania; South Korea; Taiwan; Turkey; United Kingdom; United States; Yugoslavia; Croatia; Slovenia | (Soviet Union) State Committee on the State of Emergency: Taman Guards; Kantemir Division; Communist Party; KGB; Alpha Group; Vympel Group; Supporting republics: Abkhazia; Azerbaijan; Byelorussia; Checheno-Ingushetia; Gagauzia; Tajikistan; Tatarstan; Transnistria; Turkmenistan; Uzbekistan Interfront: (Estonian Soviet Socialist Republic) Intermovement; (Latvian Soviet Socialist Republic) IFWP; (Lithuanian Soviet Socialist Republic) Yedinstvo; (Moldavian Soviet Socialist Republic) Unitate-Edinstvo; (Ukrainian Soviet Socialist Republic) International Movement of Donbass; (Russian Soviet Federative Socialist Republic) Communist Party of the RSFSR (Estonian Soviet Socialist Republic) Communist Party of Estonia (CPSU) (Latvian Soviet Socialist Republic) Communist Party of Latvia (Lithuanian Soviet Socialist Republic) Communist Party of Lithuania; Liberal Democratic Party (Soviet Union) Pro-coup and anti-Yeltsin demonstrators and organizations Diplomatic support: Afghanistan; China; Cuba; Iraq; Laos; Libya; North Korea; Sudan; PLO; Vietnam; Yugoslavia; Serbia; Montenegro |
| 1991 | 1994 | Djiboutian Civil War | Djibouti; Supported by: France | FRUD |
| 1991 | 1993 | Georgian Civil War; Part of the post-Soviet conflicts, the Wars in the Caucasus, and the Dissolution of the Soviet Union | (Georgia (country)) Pro-Shevardnadze forces: 22 December 1991 – 6 January 1992 (Georgia (country)) Rebel factions of the National Guard Mkhedrioni Tetri Artsivi Merab Kostava Society Union of Afghans; 2 January 1992 – 10 March 1992 (Georgia (country)) Military Council; Interim Government; 10 March 1992 – October 1992 (Georgia (country)) State Council; Interim Government; October 1992 – 31 December 1993 (Georgia (country)) Government of Georgia; Georgian Armed Forces; Internal Troops of Georgia; National Guard of Georgia; Supported by: Russia | (Georgia (country)) Pro-Gamsakhurdia forces: 22 December 1991 – 6 January 1992 (Georgia (country)) Government of Georgia; National Guard of Georgia 6 January 1992 – March 1992 (Georgia (country)) National Disobedience Committee March 1992 – September 1993 (Georgia (country)) Gamsakhurdia's government-in-exile; Partisans; Units of the National Guard 2 September 1993 – 6 November 1993 (Georgia (country)) Zugdidi-based government 6 November 1993 – 31 December 1993 (Georgia (country)) Partisans; Supported by: Chechen Republic of Ichkeria |
| 1992 | 2002 | Algerian Civil War | Government of Algeria; Minor involvement: Egypt; Tunisia; France; European Union; South Africa | Islamic Salvation Front loyalists Minor involvement: Morocco; Libya (until 1995); Saudi Arabia (pre-war); Iran (alleged); Saudi private donors Armed Islamic Group (from 1993); Minor involvement: Sudan (alleged); Iran (alleged); Egyptian Islamic Jihad (until 1995) Salafist Group for Preaching and Combat (from 1998); Minor involvement: Al-Qaeda |
| 1992 | 1992 | 1992 Venezuelan coup d'état attempts | (Venezuela) Venezuelan Government: Venezuelan Armed Forces | MBR-200; Cuba (alleged): DGI |
| 1992 | 1995 | Bosnian War Part of the Yugoslav Wars | Until October 1992: Bosnia and Herzegovina; Herzeg-Bosnia; Croatia October 1992–94: Bosnia and Herzegovina 1994–95: Bosnia and Herzegovina; Herzeg-Bosnia; Croatia; Supported by: NATO (bombing operations, 1995) | Until May 1992: Republika Srpska; Serbian Krajina; SFR Yugoslavia October 1992–94: Herzeg-Bosnia; Croatia May 1992–94: Republika Srpska; Serbian Krajina; Western Bosnia; Supported by: FR Yugoslavia 1994–95: Republika Srpska; Serbian Krajina; Western Bosnia; Supported by: FR Yugoslavia |
| 1992 | 1996 | Afghan Civil War (1992–1996); Part of the Afghan conflict and the Iran–Saudi Arabia proxy conflict (after Dec. 1992) | Taliban (from late 1994); Khalq (pro Taliban factions, from late 1994); Al-Qaeda (from early 1996); Supported by: Pakistan (from late 1994) | Islamic State of Afghanistan: (Afghanistan) Northern Alliance; Jamiat-e Islami; (Afghanistan) Ittehad-e Islami; Mahaz-e Milli; (Afghanistan) Harakat-i Islami; (Afghanistan) Harakat-i-Inqilab; (Afghanistan) Jebh-e Nejat-e Melli; Hezb-e Islami Khalis (until mid-1992); Hezb-i Wahdat (until Dec. 1992); (Afghanistan) Junbish-i Milli (until Jan. 1994; from Aug. 1994); Hezb-e Islami Gulbuddin (from late 1994); (Afghanistan) Shura-e Nazar; Supported by: Saudi Arabia; Uzbekistan (until Jan. 1994; from Aug. 1994); Iran (until Dec. 1992) Hezb-e Islami Gulbuddin (until late 1994); Khalq (pro Gulbuddin factions, until late 1994); Supported by: Pakistan (until late 1994) Hezb-i Wahdat (after Dec. 1992); Supported by: Iran (from Dec. 1992) (Afghanistan) Junbish-i Milli (Jan. 1994-Aug. 1994); Supported by: Uzbekistan (Jan.-Aug. 1994) Regional Kandahar Militia Leaders Afghan Army and Airforce Remnants (allegedly, until October 1992) |
| 1992 | 1997 | Tajikistani Civil War; Part of the post-Soviet conflicts and spillover of the Afghan Civil War (1992–1996) | /Tajikistan; Popular Front of Tajikistan; Communist Party of Tajikistan; Socialist Party of Tajikistan; /Russia; Uzbekistan /Kazakhstan /Kyrgyzstan Supported by: Belarus (weapons supplies); UNMOT: Austria; Bangladesh; Bulgaria; Czech Republic; Denmark; Ghana; Hungary; Indonesia; Jordan; Nepal; Nigeria; Poland; Switzerland; Ukraine; Uruguay | United Tajik Opposition; Islamic Renaissance Party; Tajik Democratic Party; Party of People's Unity; Rastokhez Popular Movement; Lali Badakhshan; Afghanistan (until 1996): Jamiat-e Islami (until 1996); Supported by: al-Qaeda; (al-Qaeda) Islamic Movement of Uzbekistan; Taliban; Iran (alleged, denied by Iran) |
| 1992 | 1993 (Note: Ceasefire agreement was signed on 1 December 1993, although fighting continued during 1994.) | War in Abkhazia (1992–1993) Part of the Georgian–Abkhazian conflict and the Georgian Civil War | Abkhazia; Confederation of Mountain Peoples of the Caucasus; Supported by: Russia (Note: See Russia's role in the conflict section for more details) | Georgia |
| 1992 | 1992 | East Prigorodny conflict Part of the post-Soviet conflicts and the Wars in the Caucasus | North Ossetia; Russian Federation | (Ingushetia) Ingush rebels |
| 1993 | 1994 | Republic of the Congo Civil War (1993–1994) | (Republic of the Congo) Republic of the Congo; Cocoye Militia | Cobra Militia; Ninja Militia |
| 1993 | 1993 | 1993 Russian constitutional crisis Part of the conflicts in the former Soviet Union | (Russia) Presidential forces: Main Administration of Protection; Ministry of the Interior; Ministry of Defence; Kantemir Division; Taman Division; Pro-Yeltsin demonstrators and organizations; (Russia) Federalists and anti-communists; Diplomatic support: Poland; Czech Republic; Romania; Slovakia; Hungary; Bulgaria; Estonia; Latvia; Lithuania; Moldova; Ukraine; Georgia; Armenia; Azerbaijan; Kazakhstan; Kyrgyzstan; Uzbekistan; Tajikistan; Australia; Canada; Germany; India; Israel; Italy; Japan; South Korea; New Zealand; United Kingdom; United States; European Economic Community; NATO | (Russia) Parliamentary forces: Congress of People's Deputies; Supreme Soviet; Anti-Yeltsin opposition: National Salvation Front; Russian National Unity; Labour Russia; Other opposition forces (Note: Supporters of Alexander Rutskoy, the Supreme Soviet and the Congress of People's Deputies frequently used those flags. The Russian tricolor itself only remained hoisted at the White House building (see video documentary).); Support: Transnistria (Note: Transnistria is a separatist and internationally unrecognized de facto state, regarded as Moldovan territory by all United Nations members.) |
| 1993 | 2005 | Burundian Civil War; Part of the spillovers of the Rwandan genocide, First and Second Congo Wars | Burundi: Armed forces; Guardians of the Peace; "Abajeunes"; Supported by: RPF (Rwanda) International peacekeepers: AMIB (2003–04); ONUB (from 2004) | Ethnic Hutu rebels: CNDD-FDD; PALIPEHUTU-FNL (Note: The PALIPEHUTU-FNL split into several factions in course of the civil war. The political and militant wings of the party separated in 1999, while the militant wing subsequently divided into FNL-Kabura, FNL-Rwasa, and FNL-Icanzo. Most of the FNL signed a peace agreement with the Burundian government in May 2005, but several dissident elements of the FNL continued to fight until 2009.); FROLINA; Hutu militias and youth gangs: Inziraguhemuka; Intagoheka; "Chicago Bulls"; ALiR; FDLR; Mai-Mai; Supported by: Zaire (until 1996); Tanzania; DR Congo (2000s): Tutsi militants: Burundian military factions; Sans Echec; Sans Défaite; Sans Pitié; Sans Capote; Imbogaraburundi; PA-Amasekanya; Supported by: RPF (Rwanda) |
| 1993 | Ongoing | Maoist insurgency in Bangladesh; Part of Terrorism in Bangladesh | Bangladesh | PBCP; PBCP–J; PBCP–LP; PBCP–ML; New PBCP; GMF PBSP; PBSP (CC); PBSP–MBRM BCP; New BCP Jamaat-ul-Mujahideen Bangladesh: Jagrata Muslim Janata Bangladesh |
| 1993 | Ongoing | Insurgency in Ecuador | Ecuador | GCP PCE-SR ELA FARE CAR (2005–2008) FARC dissidents (from 2018) |
| 1994 | 2020 | Chiapas conflict | Mexico: Paz y Justicia; United States; Guatemala Sinaloa Cartel; Gulf Cartel; Jalisco New Generation Cartel Los Zetas; Juárez Cartel | Zapatista Army of National Liberation (EZLN) Popular Revolutionary Army; Supported by: Venezuela (1999–2013) |
| 1994 | 1994 | 1994 Zapatista Uprising; Part of the Chiapas conflict | Mexico: Mexican Armed Forces | EZLN |
| 1992 | 2018 | Insurgency in Ogaden; Part of the conflicts in the Horn of Africa | Ethiopia; Supported by: Somaliland | ONLF; Supported by: Eritrea; Egypt (alleged by Ethiopia) al-Itihaad al-Islamiya (1992–97) |
| 1994 | 1994 | 1994 Bophuthatswana crisis Part of the internal resistance to apartheid and the negotiations to end apartheid in South Africa | BDF mutineers | Bophuthatswana: Afrikaner Volksfront; AWB; (South Africa) South African Defence Force |
| 1994 | 1997 | Iraqi Kurdish Civil War Part of the Iraqi–Kurdish conflict, Kurdistan Region-PKK conflict and the Iraqi no-fly zones conflict | PUK; PKK; SCIRI; KCP; Iraqi National Congress; Supported by: Iran (from 1995) (Ba'athist Syria) Syria; United States (1996) | KDP; Supported by: Iraq (from 1995); Turkey (from 1997); Iran (before 1995) |
| 1994 | 1994 | Yemeni Civil War (1994) | Yemen; Islamic Jihad in Yemen | (South Yemen) Democratic Republic of Yemen |
| 1994 | 1996 | First Chechen War Part of the Chechen–Russian conflict, the Russo-Caucasian conflict, the Wars in the Caucasus and post-Soviet conflicts | Chechen Republic of Ichkeria; Chechen Mujahideen | Russia: Loyalist |
| 1998 | 2002 | Caprivi conflict | Namibia | Caprivi Liberation Army |
| 1995 | 1995 | Cenepa War | Peru | Ecuador; Armament support by: Argentina (Chile) Chile; Diplomatic support by: United States |
| 1995 | 2002 | Eelam War III; Part of the Sri Lankan Civil War | Sri Lanka: Military of Sri Lanka | Liberation Tigers of Tamil Eelam |
| 1995 | 2018 | Second Afar Insurgency Part of the Eritrean–Ethiopian border conflict | Ethiopia; Eritrea | ARDUF; RSADO |
| 1995 | 1995 | 1995 Sudanese-Ugandan border conflict | Uganda | Sudan |
| 1995 | 1995 | Hanish Islands conflict Part of the conflicts in the Horn of Africa | Eritrea | Yemen |
| 1996 | 1999 | Arab-Masalit conflict | Arab tribes Sudan | Masalit tribes |
| 1996 | 2006 | Nepalese Civil War | Communist Party of Nepal (Maoist): People's Liberation Army, Nepal; Supported by: Communist Party of India (Maoist); Ceylon Communist Party (Maoist) | Kingdom of Nepal: Nepalese Armed Forces; Royal Nepali Army; Nepal Police; Armed Police Force; Supported by: India; Pakistan (from 2004); Belgium; China; United Kingdom; France; United States |
| 1996 | 2001 | Afghan Civil War (1996–2001) Part of the Afghan conflict | Afghanistan | Taliban; Al-Qaeda; Islamic Uzbek Movement; Pakistan |
| 1996 | 1997 | First Congo War; Part of the Congolese Civil Wars, aftermath of the Rwandan genocide, spillovers of the Burundian Civil War, the Second Sudanese Civil War and the Angolan Civil War | (Democratic Republic of the Congo) AFDL; Rwanda; Uganda; Burundi; Angola (South Sudan) SPLA; Eritrea; Supported by: South Africa; Zambia; Zimbabwe; Ethiopia; Tanzania; United States (covertly) Mai-Mai (Note: Many Mai-Mai militias in eastern Zaire initially allied themselves with Rwanda and the AFDL against Hutu militants and refugees. As soon as most Hutu were driven away, however, many Mai-Mai groups turned against Rwanda and the AFDL. Despite this, some anti-Hutu Mai-Mai remained allied with Rwanda and the AFDL.) | Zaire: FAZ; White Legion; Sudan; Chad (Rwanda) Ex-FAR/ALiR; Interahamwe; CNDD-FDD; UNITA; ADF; FLNC; Supported by: France; Central African Republic; China; Israel; Kuwait (denied) Mai-Mai |
| 1996 | Ongoing | ADF insurgency Part of the Kivu conflict | Uganda; DR Congo: Armed Forces (FARDC); MONUSCO: (United Nations) Force Intervention Brigade | ADF (1996–2015): NALU; ISIL: IS-CAP; ADF-Baluku; ADF-Mukulu: NALU; RCD/K-ML: APC; Mai-Mai Kyandenga (2020–present); Supported by: FARDC elements LRA; Al-Shabaab (disputed); Various Jihadi groups (Ugandan and MONUSCO claim); Sudan (1990s; currently unknown) |
| 1997 | 1997 | 1997 Albanian civil unrest | Albanian Government; Democratic Party; SHIK; Part of the Albanian Police; Republican Guard; (United Nations) UNSC missions; Austria; France; Germany; Greece; Italy; Romania; Spain; Turkey; United States | Albanian Rebels; Armed civilians who lost their properties; Armed gangs; Albanian Army defectors; Salvation Committees; Socialist Party; Social Democratic Party |
| 1997 | 1997 | 1997 Sudanese-Eritrean border conflict | Eritrea | Sudan |
| 1997 | 1999 | Republic of the Congo Civil War (1997–1999); Part of the aftermaths of the First Congo War and Rwandan genocide | Armed Forces of the Republic of the Congo (from October 1997); Cobra Militia (Rwanda) Rwandan Hutu Militia; Angola; Chad | Armed Forces of the Republic of the Congo (to October 1997); Cocoye Militia; Ninja Militia; Nsiloulou; Supported by: Jonas Savimbi; FLEC; Supported by: DR Congo |
| 1997 | 1997 | 1997 clashes in Cambodia | Cambodian People's Party | FUNCINPEC (Cambodia) Khmer Rouge (mostly in the northern provinces) |
| 1998 | 1998 | 1998 Monrovia clashes Part of the aftermath of the First Liberian Civil War | (Liberia) Liberian government (Taylor loyalists) | (Liberia) Johnson's forces (ex-ULIMO-J); Limited involvement: Nigeria; United States |
| 1998 | 1999 | Kosovo War Part of the Yugoslav Wars | Kosovo Liberation Army; FARK (Note: From August 1998 as the Kosovo Liberation Army as 138th Brigade.); NATO (from 24 March 1999): Belgium; Canada; Denmark; France; Germany; Italy; Netherlands; Norway; Portugal; Spain; Turkey; United Kingdom; United States | FR Yugoslavia |
| 1998 | 2000 | Eritrean–Ethiopian War; Part of the Eritrean–Ethiopian border conflict | Ethiopia | Eritrea |
| 1998 | 1998 | War in Abkhazia (1998) Part of the Georgian–Abkhazian conflict | Abkhazia | Georgian separatists: White Legion; Mkhedrioni; Forest Brothers |
| 1998 | 1999 | Guinea-Bissau Civil War | Military rebels MFDC; Supported by: United States | Guinea-Bissau; Senegal; Guinea; Supported by: France; Portugal |
| 1998 | 2003 | Second Congo War; Part of the Congolese Civil Wars and the aftermath of the First Congo War and the Angolan Civil War | Pro-government: DR Congo; Angola; Chad; Namibia; Zimbabwe; Sudan (alleged); Anti-Ugandan forces: LRA; ADF; UNRF II; FNI; Anti-Rwandan militias: FDLR; (Rwanda) ALiR; Interahamwe; RDR; Mai-Mai; Other Hutu-aligned forces; Anti-Burundi militias: CNDD-FDD; FROLINA | Rwandan-aligned militias: RCD; RCD-Goma; Banyamulenge; Ugandan-aligned militias: MLC; Forces for Renewal; UPC; Other Tutsi-aligned forces; Anti-Angolan forces: UNITA; Foreign state actors: Uganda; Rwanda; Burundi; Libya (alleged) |
| 1998 | 1998 | 1998 Saudi-Yemeni border clash | Yemen | Saudi Arabia |
| 1998 | Ongoing | Al-Qaeda insurgency in Yemen; Part of the war on terror and the Yemeni Civil War | Republic of Yemen (internationally recognized; led by the PLC since 2022): Yemeni Armed Forces; Republican Guard; General People's Congress (anti-Houthi); STC (2022–present) (Note: Since April 2022, the Southern Transitional Council is part of the Yemeni government led by the Presidential Leadership Council. Multiple sources: Salem, Mostafa; Kolirin, Lianne (7 April 2022). "Hopes of peace in Yemen as President hands power to new presidential council". CNN. Archived from the original on 8 April 2022.; Ghobari, Mohamed (7 April 2022). "Yemen president sacks deputy, delegates presidential powers to council". Reuters. Aden. Archived from the original on 1 May 2022.; Al-Sakani, Ali (19 April 2022). "Yemen inaugurates new presidential council". Al Jazeera. Archived from the original on 1 March 2023.); United Arab Emirates; Yemeni National Resistance (2017–present); Tihamah Resistance; Giants Brigades; Hadhramaut Tribal Alliance; Al-Islah; Bani Dhabyan; Saleh loyalists (2017–present); Popular Resistance Committees; Popular Committees; Saudi-led coalition: Saudi Arabia; United Arab Emirates; Sudan; Senegal; Morocco (2015–19); Qatar (2015–17); Bahrain; Academi security guards (2015–16); Supported by: United States: U.S. Navy (Note: logistic support and assistance with the naval blockade of Houthi-held territories in October 2016); United States Army (Special Forces); United Kingdom (Note: training, intelligence, logistical support, weapons, and blockade up to 2017); France; Canada; South Korea: National Intelligence Service; Belarus: Belarusian military specialists; Malaysia; Australia STC (2017–2022) United Arab Emirates | al-Qaeda: AQAP; Ansar al-Sharia; Islamic Emirate of Yemen; Aden-Abyan Islamic Army; Council of Sunni Scholars and al-Jama'a; Hadrami Domestic Council faction; al-Dhahab tribesmen; Supported by: al-Shabaab (2009–present) (alleged); al-Qaeda in the Islamic Maghreb (2009–2017); al-Qaeda in the Indian Subcontinent (2014–present); Al-Nusra Front (2012–2017); Alleged Support: Iran (denied); Qatar (denied); Supreme Political Council (formerly SRC): Houthi movement; General People's Congress (pro-Houthi); Saleh loyalists (until 2017); Pro-Houthi Popular Committees; Sanaa-GPC forces; Alleged support: Iran; Hezbollah; North Korea; Islamic State: Islamic State - Yemen Province |
| 1999 | 2002 | Maluku sectarian conflict Part of the post-Suharto era in Indonesia | Government of Indonesia Indonesian National Armed Forces; Indonesian National Police; Pancasila Youth: Pasukan Kuning | Muslim society and Islamists in Maluku; Laskar Jihad; Komando Jihad; Islamic Defenders Front; Jemaah Islamiyah; Laskar Mujahidin; Pasukan Jihad; Desa Sabaleh; Laskar Mujahida; Christian society in Maluku; Laskar Kristus; Maluku Sovereignty Front; Brigade Manguni; Pasukan Merah |
| 1999 | 2002 | 1999 East Timorese crisis Part of the decolonisation of Asia and the fall of Suharto | East Timor; INTERFET (United Nations) UNTAET | Pro-Indonesia militias: Aitarak; Besi Merah Putih; Laksaur; Mahidi |
| 1999 | 2003 | Second Liberian Civil War; Part of the Liberian Civil Wars and spillover of the Sierra Leone Civil War | (Liberia) Rebel groups: Anti-Taylor Armed Forces elements; LURD; MODEL; Guinea; Sierra Leone; Supported by: Ivory Coast; United Kingdom; United States | (Liberia) Liberian government: Loyalist Armed Forces elements; ATU; SOD; SSS; NPFL/NPP militias; RUF; RDFG |
| 1999 | 1999 | Kargil War Part of the Kashmir conflict and the India–Pakistan conflict | India | Pakistan; Non-state allies: United Jihad Council; Afghan mercenaries |
| 1999 | 2001 | Insurgency in the Preševo Valley Part of the Yugoslav Wars | FR Yugoslavia KFOR | UÇPMB |
| 1999 | 1999 | Batken Conflict | Kyrgyzstan; Russia (material support); Uzbekistan (military support) | Islamic Movement of Uzbekistan |
| 1972 | Ongoing | Ituri conflict Part of the Second Congo War and the Kivu conflict | Hema ethnic group: UPC; RCD/K-ML; FAPC; Uganda DR Congo (FARDC); UN (MONUC); EU (Artemis) | Lendu ethnic group: FNI; FRPI; CODECO; FPJC; Mai-Mai Simba ADF (Islamic State) IS-CAP; Mai-Mai Kyandenga |
| 1999 | 1999 | War of Dagestan; Part of the spillover of the Second Chechen War, Post-Soviet conflicts | Russia: Armed Forces; Army; Navy; Air Force; VDV; Spetsnaz GRU; FSB; MVD; Militsiya; Internal Troops; OMON; Dagestan; (Dagestan) Dagestani police and local militia | Islamic Djamaat of Dagestan: CPID; Chechnya: IIPB; SPIR; Religious Police |
| 1999 | 2009 | Second Chechen War; Part of the Chechen-Russian conflict and the Post-Soviet conflicts | Russia: Provisional Council (until 2000); Chechen Republic (from 2000) | Chechen Republic of Ichkeria (1999–2007): Caucasian Front (2005–2007); Caucasus Emirate (2007–2009): North Caucasian volunteers; Mujahideen Grey Wolves |

== See also ==
- List of wars: 2003–2019
- List of wars: 2020-Present
