= Origins of Hutu, Tutsi and Twa =

The origins of the Hutu, Tutsi and Twa peoples is a major issue of controversy in the histories of Rwanda and Burundi, as well as the Great Lakes region of Africa. The relationship among the three modern populations is thus, in many ways, derived from the perceived origins and claim to "Rwandan-ness". The largest conflicts related to this question were the Rwandan genocide, the Burundian genocide (Hutu and Tutsi), and the First and Second Congo Wars.

Ugandan scholar Mahmoud Mamdani identifies at least four distinct foundations for studies that support the "distinct difference between Hutu and Tutsi" school of thought: phenotype and genotype, cultural memory of inhabitants of Rwanda, archeology, and linguistics.

Most Tutsis and Hutus both carry the Haplogroup E1b1a paternal haplogroup which is common among Bantu and most other Niger-Congo-speaking populations.

== Overview ==
When Europeans arrived in Rwanda and began documenting traditions, Rwandan society consisted of three ethnicities that also serve as social castes. The largest group was the Hutu, consisting mostly of farmers. The second largest group was the Tutsi, mostly pastoralists, warriors and aristocrats. The smallest group was the Twa, a group of pygmy that hunted game to trade for agricultural products from the farmers. All three groups speak Kinyarwanda and Kirundi, which are Bantu languages.

There is disagreement as to when and how each group appeared in Rwanda. Some suggest the three groups diverged from each other while others suggest each group arriving in separate migration waves, first Twa, then Hutu, and finally Tutsi. In the separate arrival story, there is dispute in where the groups came from, when and how they arrived, and whether the arrival of some groups brought with them certain social development.

Ethnic violence in Rwanda and Burundi
- Part of the decolonisation of Africa and its aftermath
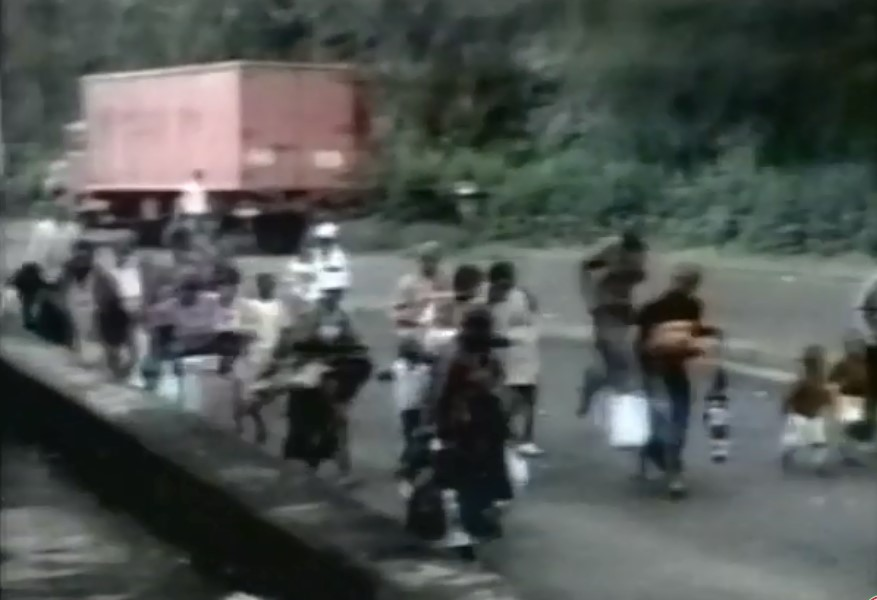
- Left: Rwanda when the 1994 genocide began. The green areas are under the control of the interim Hutu Power government established following the assassination of Juvénal Habyarimana on 6 April 1994. Right: People fleeing the large anti-Tutsi pogroms in Burundi in 1993 following the assassination of democratically elected Hutu president Melchior Ndadaye, which triggered the Burundian civil war
Date	Rwanda: 1 November 1959 – 19 July 1994; Burundi: 1 July 1962 – 15 May 2005
Location	Rwanda and Burundi
Result	Rwanda: Tutsi (Rwandan Patriotic Front) victory; - End of anti-Tutsi pogroms since independence in 1962, the Rwandan Civil War and the 1994 Rwandan genocide; - Continued Hutu Power insurgency by Habyarimana loyalists and génocidaires in DRC; - Appointment of Paul Kagame as president in 2000; Burundi: Peace agreement; - Assassination of Melchior Ndadaye; - Partition of parliament 60:40 between Hutu and Tutsi, with Twa guaranteed 3 seats; - End of Burundian Civil War in 2005

Belligerents
Hutu nationalists: Rwanda; PARMEHUTU (until 1973); National Revolutionary Movement for Development (MRND; 1975-1994); Interahamwe (1990-1994); Coalition for the Defense of the Republic (CDR; 1992-1994); Impuzamugambi (1992-1994); Akazu (1973-1994); Republican Democratic Movement (MDR; Hutu Power faction, 1991-1994); Other Hutu Power gangs; Supported by: Belgium; France; Zaire (1971-1994)	Tutsi exiles: Kingdom of Rwanda (in exile); UNAR (until 1963); Inyenzi movement (until mid-1970's); Rwandan Patriotic Front (RPF; 1990-1994); Rwandan Patriotic Army (1990-1994); Republican Democratic Movement (MDR; moderate Hutu faction, 1992-1994); Other moderate Hutus; Supported by: Uganda; United Kingdom; United States
Burundi: National Council for the Defense of Democracy – Forces for the Defense of Democracy (CNDD-FDD; 1994-2005); National Liberation Front (FROLINA; until 2005); PALIPEHUTU-FNL (until 2005); Other Burundian Hutu Power gangs; Supported by: Army for the Liberation of Rwanda (ex-FAR/ALiR; 1996-2001); Democratic Forces for the Liberation of Rwanda (FDLR; 2000-2005)	Kingdom of Burundi (1962-1966); UPRONA (1962-1993; 1996-2003); Burundian Army; FRODEBU (1986-1996; 2003-2005); Tutsi military dictatorships (1966-1993; 1996-2003); Democratically elected Hutu governments (1993-1996; 2003-2005)

== Origin myths ==
Starkly contrasted, the Tutsi origin myth holds that Kanyarwanda had several sons, including Gatutsi and Gahutu, ancestors of the Tutsi and Hutu who are therefore brothers. The Hutu origin myth holds that Kigwa (patrilineal ancestor of Ruhanga and the first Tutsi) fell from the sky on an earth inhabited by Hutu.

== Hamitic hypothesis of Tutsi origin ==
The colonial scholars who found complex societies in sub-Saharan Africa developed the Hamitic hypothesis. The now rejected hypothesis posits that the Tutsi were of Hamitic stock who originated from the Horn of Africa, and subsequently conquered Rwanda and brought civilization to the region.

== Migration hypothesis of Tutsi origin ==
Supporters of the migration theory also support the idea that Tutsi came from the Horn of Africa, a later theory proposed that the Tutsi had instead migrated from nearby interior East Africa, and that the physical differences were the result of natural selection in an arid climate over millennia. Among the most detailed theories was one put forward by Jean Hiernaux, based on studies of blood factors and archeology.

Noting the fossil record of a tall people with narrow facial features several thousand years ago in East Africa, including locations such as Gambles Cave in the Kenya Rift Valley and Olduvai Gorge in northern Tanzania, Hiernaux argues that while there was a migration, it was not as dramatic as some sources have proposed. He explicitly attacks the Hamitic theory that migrants from Ethiopia brought civilization to other Africans.

In light of recent genetic studies, Hiernaux's theory on the origin of Tutsis in East Africa appears doubtful. It has also been demonstrated that the Tutsis harbor little to no Northeastern African genetic influence on their paternal line. On the other hand, there is currently no mtDNA data available for the Tutsi, which might help shed light on their background.

One school of thought noted that the influx of pastoralists around the fifteenth century may have taken place over an extended period of time and been gradual and peaceful, rather than sudden and violent. The key distinction made was that migration was not the same as conquest. Other scholars delinked the arrival of Tutsi from the development of pastoralism and the beginning of the period of state building. It appears clear that pastoralism was practiced in Rwanda prior to the fifteenth century immigration, while the dates of state formation and pastoralist influx do not entirely match. This argument thus attempts to downplay the importance of the pastoralist migrations.

== Local divergence ==
Still other studies point out that cultural transmission can occur without actual human migration. This raises the question of how much of the changes around the fifteenth and sixteenth centuries was the result of an influx of people as opposed to the existing population being exposed to new ideas. Studies that approach the subject of racial purity are among the most controversial. These studies point out that the pastoralist migrants and pre-migration Rwandans lived side by side for centuries and practiced extensive intermarriage. The notion that current Rwandans can claim exclusively Tutsi or Hutu bloodlines is thus questioned.

Roger Blench has proposed that Twa originated as a caste like they are today, which became endogamous and consequently developed into separate ethnic groups with their own languages. A mismatch in language between patron and client could later occur from population displacements. The short stature of the "forest people" could have developed in the millennia since the Bantu expansion, as happened also with Bantu domestic animals in the rainforest. Perhaps there was additional selective pressure from farmers removing the tallest women from the pygmy population by taking them back to their villages as wives.

== Genetic studies ==
More recent studies have de-emphasized physical appearance, such as height and nose width, in favor of examining blood factors, the presence of the sickle cell trait, lactose intolerance in adults, and other genotype expressions. Excoffier et al. (1987) claimed that the Tutsi and Hima, despite being surrounded by Bantu populations, are "closer genetically to Cushites and Ethiosemites". (Note: Excoffier, Laurent; Pellegrini, B.; Sanchez-Mazas, A.; Simon, C.; Langaney, A. (1987). "Genetics and History of Sub-Saharan Africa". Yearbook of Physical Anthropology. 30 (S8): 151–194. doi:10.1002/ajpa.1330300510. Quoted in)

Another study concluded that, while the sickle cell trait among the Rwandan Hutu was comparable to that of neighboring people, it was almost non-existent among Rwandan Tutsi. Presence of the sickle cell trait is evidence of survival in the presence of malaria over many centuries, suggesting differing origins. Regional studies of the ability to digest lactose are also supportive. The ability to digest lactose among African adults is widespread only among desert-dwelling nomadic groups that have depended upon milk for millennia.

Three quarters of the adult Tutsi of Rwanda and Burundi have a high ability to digest lactose, while only 5% of the adults of the neighboring Shi people of eastern Congo can. Among Hutu, one in three adults has a high capacity for lactose digestion, a surprisingly high number for an agrarian people, which Mamdani suggests may be the result of centuries of intermarriage with Tutsi.

In the 1988 UNESCO General History, Bethwell Ogot says that the number of pastoralists in Rwanda increased sharply around the fifteenth century. Although Luis et al. (2004) in a more general study on bi-allelic markers in many African countries found a statistically significant genetic difference between Tutsi and Hutu, the overall difference were not large.

According to data from 1969, the Tutsi and Hima groups possessed the enzyme of milk sugar lactose tolerance, which is highly prevalent in European populations, but the Bantu tribes were lactose deficient, similar results and conclusions were reached by the geneticist Sarah A. Tishkoff in 2007.

=== Y-DNA (paternal) ===
Modern-day genetic studies of the Y-chromosome generally indicate that the Tutsi, like the Hutu, are largely of Bantu extraction (80% E1b1a, 10% B, 4% E3). Paternal genetic influences associated with the Horn of Africa and North Africa are few (less than 10% E1b1b), and are ascribed to assimilated southern Cushites. However, the Tutsi have considerably more haplogroup B paternal lineages (14.9% B) than do the Hutu (4.3% B).

Trombetta et al. (2015) found 22.2% of E1b1b in a sample of Tutsis from Burundi, but no bearers of the haplogroup among the local Hutu and Twa populations. The subclade was of the E-M293 variety, which suggests that the ancestors of Tutsis in this area may have been remnants of South Cushitic pastoralists.

=== Autosomal DNA (overall ancestry) ===
In general, the Tutsi appear to share a close genetic kinship with neighboring Nilotic populations, particularly the Maasai. It is unclear whether this similarity is primarily due to extensive genetic exchanges between these communities through intermarriage or whether it ultimately stems from common origins.

... generations of gene flow obliterated whatever clear-cut physical distinctions may have once existed between these two Bantu peoples – renowned to be height, body build, and facial features. With a spectrum of physical variation in the peoples, Belgian authorities legally mandated ethnic affiliation in the 1920s, based on economic criteria. Formal and discrete social divisions were consequently imposed upon ambiguous biological distinctions. To some extent, the permeability of these categories in the intervening decades helped to reify the biological distinctions, generating a taller elite and a shorter underclass, but with little relation to the gene pools that had existed a few centuries ago. The social categories are thus real, but there is little if any detectable genetic differentiation between Hutu and Tutsi.

Tishkoff et al. (2009) found their mixed Hutu and Tutsi samples from Rwanda to be predominately of Bantu origin, but with evidence of some gene flow from Nilo-Saharan and Afro-Asiatic communities.
