= Charlotte Wilson (VSO) =

British volunteer teacher (1973–2000)

Charlotte Wilson (4 June 1973 – 28 December 2000) was a British volunteer teacher working with the organisation Voluntary Services Overseas (VSO) in Rwanda. She was murdered in Burundi in December 2000 by the National Forces of Liberation (Palipehutu-FNL or FNL), a Hutu rebel group, along with her Burundian fiancé and nineteen others travelling from Kigali to Bujumbura. The incident became known as the Titanic Express massacre, named after the bus service on which the victims were travelling.

== Biography ==
Charlotte grew up in the town of Hoddesdon, Hertfordshire and attended Sheredes School, the local comprehensive school. Her father died of leukaemia when she was six years old, leaving her alone with her mother Margot, brother Richard and sister Catherine. She was in a position of some responsibility as the eldest. She went on to Imperial College, London where she studied biochemistry and later gained a PhD in molecular biology. Charlotte lived in Paris for a time, and also made several visits to Africa during her time at university.

In 1999, having recently finished her PhD, during which time she had been a volunteer with St. John Ambulance in Hammersmith, Charlotte made the decision to become a volunteer science teacher with VSO. She was posted to the village of Shyogwe, near Gitarama in southern Rwanda, one of 23 in the second wave of volunteers sent by VSO, who had recently opened a programme to help rebuild the country shattered by the 1994 genocide. Charlotte enjoyed her time in Rwanda and integrated well into the local community, despite having to teach in French and being one of only a handful of white people in the area.

In late 2000, Charlotte met and fell in love with Richard Ndereyimana, a Burundian who had been in Rwanda since 1997, first as a Dominican friar and later as a teacher. A few weeks later the couple decided to get engaged. They spent Christmas together with other volunteers by Lake Kivu, then decided to travel to Bujumubura, the Burundian capital to meet with Richard's family, despite the fact that the whole of Burundi, and particularly rural areas, was in a state of civil war and out of bounds to VSO volunteers.

== Death ==
The couple decided to travel with the now defunct Titanic Express bus service from Kigali to Bujumbura, a journey usually taking around seven hours, to introduce Charlotte to Richard's family. They crossed the border and reached the village of Kilima, only 18 miles from their destination, when the bus was ambushed from all sides by armed members of the FNL Hutu extremist group. They demanded money first, and then divided the passengers by ethnicity. The Hutus and most Congolese on the bus were spared but the Tutsis and Charlotte, 21 people in all, were forced to lie face down on the ground and shot one-by-one. Charlotte and Richard were the first to be killed, with the attackers accusing Charlotte of being from the group which supplied the weapons for the Burundi Civil War, a reference to the fact that white people (from Eastern Europe) had supplied the weaponry possessed by most of the combatants, including the guns which were actually used in the killings. Charlotte's body was retrieved from the scene by VSO Rwanda officials and flown back to the UK. Wilson was 27 years old.

== Aftermath ==
In the weeks following the killings, Charlotte's mother and her younger brother, Richard, made public appeals to the British government to investigate the incident and to treat it as a war crime, a move which met with limited success. Richard continued his enquiries personally, however, and via the Human Rights Watch organisation and various contacts he had made in Rwanda and Burundi, he established that the FNL, under the leadership of Albert Sibomana, were responsible for the killing. Richard managed to get hold of a copy of an internal FNL memo detailing the number of victims and bullets used, plus the items stolen. He also found Pierre Nzeyimana, one of the very few survivors of the massacre, who described to him exactly what had happened.

The FNL finally admitted responsibility for the massacre in 2005, but by then they, and indeed Sibomana himself, were being given "provisional immunity" by the Burundi government and the international community as part of a tentative peace process being negotiated in the country.

In 2006, Richard wrote a book titled Titanic Express: Finding Answers in the Aftermath of Terror, describing the events leading up to his sister's death and his own efforts in tracking down and attempting to bring her killers to justice.

== The Charlotte Wilson Memorial Fund ==
Charlotte's family established the Charlotte Wilson Memorial Fund a few weeks after her death to support students in financial difficulty at Shyogwe school, where Charlotte had been teaching. By 4 June 2001, (the day that would have been Charlotte's 28th birthday) the fund had raised more than £10,000, and has since widened its activities to support HIV awareness campaigns in Rwanda and peacebuilding work in Burundi. In Titanic Express, Richard Wilson writes of his pride in the fund's success:

"We believe, as Charlotte did, that Africa's problems can only be solved by Africans themselves, but that our solidarity can help. A week after the August 2004 Gatumba massacre, a multi-ethnic group of Burundian volunteers from 'Youth Intervention for Peace' took food and clothes to the survivors, paid for in part by the Charlotte Wilson Memorial Fund. It was only a small gesture, but it was something they could do."
