= Carolyn McAskie =

Canadian diplomat, UN official

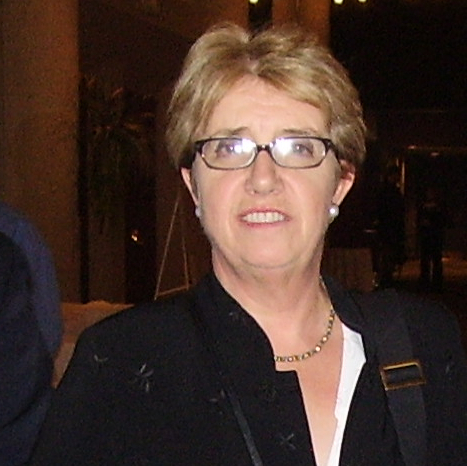
- Born: Glasgow, Scotland
- Occupation: Diplomat
- Years active: 1975-

Carolyn McAskie OC is a Canadian diplomat and former assistant secretary-general for peacekeeping at the United Nations. She was the head of the United Nations mission to Burundi (ONUB) in 2004, making her the first Canadian to lead a United Nations peacekeeping mission following the UN's switch to complex missions.

== Biography ==
McAskie was born in Glasgow, Scotland. She entered the Canadian Civil Service in 1968.

From 1975–1980, McAskie served as Assistant Director of Finance and Personnel at the Commonwealth Secretariat in London.

Her first major role with the government of Canada was as Canadian High Commissioner to Sri Lanka and the Maldives in 1983. In 1985, she participated in the World Conference on Women. In 1993, McAskie began working at the Canadian International Development Agency (CIDA). She served as Vice-President for African and the Middle Eastern programs, as well as Vice-President for CIDA's multilateral programs.

As of 2018, McAskie is a senior fellow at the University of Ottawa's Graduate School of Public and International Affairs. She was also a director for CANADEM, and a director of Pearson Peacekeeping Centre.

== United Nations ==
McAskie has been a part of multiple delegations to the United Nations. She was appointed deputy Emergency Relief Coordinator in 1999. She replaced Sérgio Vieira de Mello and became the interim Emergency Relief Coordinator from 1999–2004 due to De Mello's mission in Timor-Leste. She has assisted in several relief efforts in Africa over her term. As coordinator, she visited Ethiopia, Eritrea, and Kenya on 10 July 2000, to examine the effects of the drought and to organize relief efforts. McAskie visited the Democratic Republic of the Congo in May 2003 to assess renewed fighting in Ituri.

From 2004 to April 2006, McAskie was the Special Representative of the Secretary-General and head of the United Nations mission (ONUB) to Burundi, and led ceasefire talks in the Burundian Civil War. She was the first Canadian to lead a UN peacekeeping mission following the United Nations' switch to complex missions.

On 16 May 2006, McAskie was named assistant secretary-general for peacebuilding support.

== Awards ==
In April 2005, McAskie received an honorary degree from the University of British Columbia.

On 3 May 2007, McAskie was awarded with the Order of Canada for her efforts in peacekeeping and international diplomacy.
