= List of non-governmental organizations with consultative status at the United Nations =

This is a list of non-governmental organizations with consultative status at the United Nations.

- Agri-Energy Roundtable
- Armenian Assembly of America
- Article 12
- AIESEC
- CANADEM
- Conference of NGOs
- Global Policy Forum
- Global Youth Action Network
- International League of Esperanto Instructors
- Islands First
- Russian Academy of Natural Sciences
- Transparency International
- United Nations Youth Associations Network
- Universal Esperanto Association
- World Association of Investment Promotion Agencies
- World Council of Arameans
- World Federation of United Nations Associations

== See also ==
- Category:United Nations Youth Associations Network
- Category:World Federation of United Nations Associations
