= Global Volunteers =

International nonprofit organization

Global Volunteers is an international nonprofit organization (NPO) holding special consultative status with the United Nations. Headquartered in St. Paul, Minnesota, Global Volunteers assists worldwide community development programs by mobilizing short-term volunteers on local work programs, as well as providing project funding and child sponsorships.

Established in 1984 by Bud Philbrook and Michele Gran, Global Volunteers was designed to foster individual cross cultural experiences: "the foundation for peace-building relationships, one person at a time.”

The organization takes on many types of projects, ensuring benefits to serve communities by monitoring work effectiveness, volunteer retention, and through working closely with local community leaders.

In 2011 the organization published The Essential Services prospectus, explaining the foundational community projects providing essential services as identified by United Nations' agencies - the World Food Programme and UNICEF specifically - to address the complex issues preventing children from developing fully.

Since 1984 Global Volunteers has helped partner communities deliver most of these services to local people worldwide. Hunger, health and IQ are the three top-level categories used to organize these.

Global Volunteers strictly adheres to IRS requirements that volunteers work, on average, eight hours per day, five days out of seven to ensure the legitimacy of this tax benefit.
