= Gatumba Refugee Camp =

Former Refugee Camp in Burundi

Gatumba Refugee Camp is also known as Gatumba Transit Center was a temporary refugee camp in Burundi which was massacred in 2004 by Forces for National Liberation rebels.

== Location ==
Gatumba Refugee Camp was located in Gatumba, Mutimbuzi commune, Bujumbura Rural Province, about 10 miles in Northest Bujumbura on the highway to Uvira.

== Background ==
Gatumba refugee camp was managed by United Nations High Commissioner for Refugees. The camp was mainly for transit of refugees who fled Democratic Republic of Congo because of the Kivu conflict in the South Kivu.

As of September 2004, Gatumba refugee camp had no people staying except the security guards who were protecting the school building and one of the survivors because of the massacre which took place on 13 August 2004.

== Demographics ==
As 13 August 2004, Gatumba refugee camp had 825 Congolese refugees who mostly belonged to Banyamulenge ethnic group. However, the population also had people from Bembe, Vira and Fulero ethnic groups.

== The Gatumba Massacre ==
On 13 August 2004, a group of armed people belonging to the Forces for National Liberation also known as the Forces pour la Liberation Nationale (FNL) massacred around 152 refugees from DRC and left 106 refugees wounded at Gatumba refugee camp. During the time of attack, the camp had around 800 refugees being housed. These people were among the 20,000 refugees ho had fled DRC because of the Kivu conflict

The rebel group who were armed with machetes, automatic weapons and grenades attacked the people at night when they were sleeping in the plastic hangars within the camp. They massacred people which included women, men and families by burning. During the attack, 136 people were killed on the scene and 20 died in hospital.

After the massacre, 500 refugees survived and 400 of them were relocated to a nearby school and 100 located for their own accommodation in Bujumbura.

== See also ==
- Gatumba
- Kivu conflict
