= Titanic Express massacre =

Bus Tragedy

- Part of the Burundian civil war
- Location: Near Bujumbura, Burundi
- Date: 28 December 2000
- Target: Tutsis and one British citizen, Charlotte Wilson
- Attack type: Massacre
- Weapon: Machine guns
- Deaths: 21
- Perpetrator: FNL (suspected)
- Motive: anti-Tutsi sentiment

The Titanic Express massacre took place on 28 December 2000, when 21 people were killed in an attack on a Titanic Express bus close to Bujumbura (then the capital of Burundi).

The passengers, who had traveled from Kigali in Rwanda, were robbed of their valuables and then separated according to their ethnicity. Hutus and most Congolese were released unharmed. The Tutsis on board, and one British woman, Charlotte Wilson, who was traveling with her Burundian fiancé, were forced to lie face down on the ground and then shot. According to news reports, one of the Hutu passengers had been told to "tell the army we're going to kill them all and there's nothing you can do."

The attack took place in the province of Bujumbura Rural, a stronghold of the Hutu-extremist group Palipehutu-FNL (commonly known as FNL). The group is known for its hostility to the Tutsi ethnic group and is believed to have carried out dozens of similar attacks in the same area. Although the FNL has denied responsibility for the "Titanic Express" attack, the Burundian authorities and a number of human rights groups have publicly blamed them for the massacre.

In May 2001, the International Crisis Group attributed the Titanic Express attack to "troops under the order of... Agathon Rwasa". In January 2004, the Sunday Times announced the discovery of a document which appears to be an FNL report, signed by a senior commander, detailing how the Titanic Express massacre was carried out. In June 2006, detailed eyewitness accounts of the attack were published in the book Titanic Express: Finding Answers in the Aftermath of Terror, by Richard Wilson, the brother of Charlotte Wilson.
