= 2001 Burundian coup attempt =

2001 Burundian coup d'état attempt
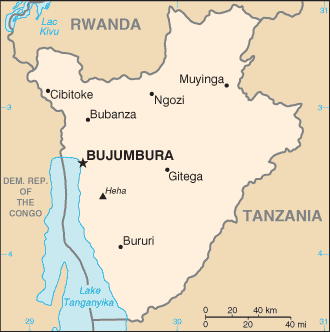
- A CIA WFB map of Burundi
- Date: 18 April 2001
- Location: Bujumbura, Burundi
- Type: Military coup
- Motive: Regime change
- Target: Presidential Palace, Bujumbura
- Participants: Group of junior Tutsi Army officers
- Outcome: Coup fails: Pierre Buyoya remains in power

The 2001 Burundian coup d'état attempt was a bloodless military coup attempt by a group of junior Tutsi Army officers that took place in Burundi on 18 April 2001. The coup took place while the President, Pierre Buyoya, was in Gabon attending peace talks with the Hutu rebel group who had been fighting the government during the Burundian Civil War. The conspirators briefly occupied the state-run radio station in Bujumbura, but were quickly removed by forces loyal to Buyoya.
