= Gatumba =

- Location in Burundi
- Coordinates: 3°20′S 29°15′E
- Country: Burundi

Population (2008)
  - Total: 11,700

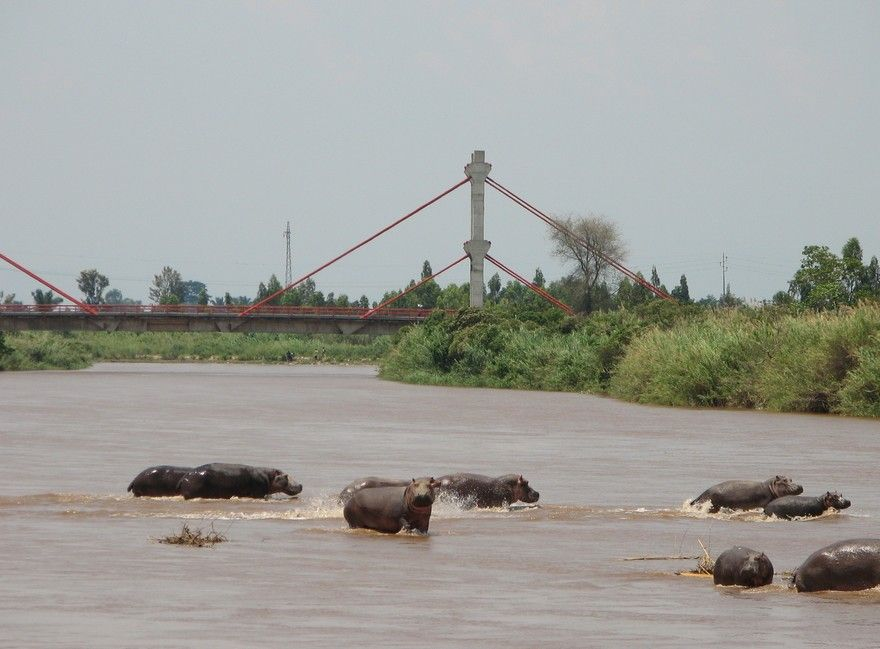
Hippos in Gatumba

Gatumba is a village in western Burundi, near the border with the Democratic Republic of the Congo. The place is known for a massacre that took place at Gatumba refugee camp connected to the village.

== Massacre ==
On August 13, 2004, a refugee camp in Gatumba was the scene of one of the largest civilian massacres carried out in Burundi in recent years.

A force of armed combatants, many of them members of the Forces for National Liberation (FNL), massacred at least 166 Congolese civilians and wounded another 106. The FNL is a predominantly Hutu rebel movement known for its hostility to Tutsi and the victims were largely Banyamulenge, a group often categorized with Tutsi. The FNL is believed to have been behind a series of other attacks, including the December 28, 2000 Titanic Express massacre.

Brigadier-General Germain Niyoyankana, head of the Burundian army, accused Congolese troops of complicity in the killings.

Following the FNL's admission of responsibility for the Gatumba massacre, the Burundian government issued arrest warrants for the group's leader, Agathon Rwasa, and declared its intention to refer the matter to the International Criminal Court. The United Nations issued a resolution condemning the attack, and the African Union declared the FNL a terrorist organisation. No arrests have yet been made.

== FNL statement ==
In October 2005, the FNL issued a statement condemning the Gatumba massacre, denouncing Agathon Rwasa for leading a "descent into hell", and announcing that he had been replaced. Rwasa was reported to have fled to Tanzania.
