= African Union Mission in Burundi =

African Union military force deployed to Burundi in 2003

The African Union Mission in Burundi (AMIB) was a regional peacekeeping mission deployed by the African Union to Burundi in 2003 during the latter stages of the Burundian Civil War. The mission, consisting of 2,870 troops from South Africa, Mozambique and Ethiopia, remained in the country for one year, when it was replaced by the United Nations Operation in Burundi (ONUB) under the United Nations. The official transfer of authority from AMIB to ONUB took place on 1 June 2004. The South African component of the force remained and was formed into the African Union Special Task Force (AU STF).
