= Guardians of the Peace =

Burundian militia group (1997-2005)

The Guardians of the Peace (French: Gardiens de la Paix) were a pro-government paramilitary militia active in Burundi during the Burundian Civil War (1993–2006). It is believed to have existed between 1997 and 2005. According to the government, the militia was primarily intended to secure the rural areas against rebel groups as part of a policy of "civilian self-defence". Its members were armed but not uniformed. It was founded by Colonel Ascension Twagiramungu and is believed to have recruited primarily among adolescents, children and former anti-government rebels in rural Burundi. Although recognised as a semi-official organisation, the Guardians of the Peace were never a single entity and instead consisted of autonomous regional groups.

Founded in 1997, Guardians of the Peace from across Burundi were deployed to Bujumbura when it was besieged by National Forces of Liberation (FLN) rebels in 2000. They are believed to have sustained heavy casualties during the operation, though they expanded rapidly in size during the escalation of the Civil War in 2001. Both FLN and Forces for the Defense of Democracy (FDD) rebels specifically targeted individual members of the organisation in order to intimidate other Guardians of the Peace. It is estimated that as many as 30,000 Burundians received training as Guardians of the Peace during the period. In Bururi Province, it was estimated that there were 5,000 active Guardians of the Peace with smaller numbers in other regional groups.

The government begun the demobilisation of the Guardians of the Peace in 2003 and the process was finally completed on 30 September 2005.
