= United Nations Support Office for AMISOM =

United Nations field support operation for the African Union Mission in Somalia

The United Nations Support Office for AMISOM (UNSOA) was a field support operation led by the United Nations Department of Field Support (DFS). It was located in Mogadishu and Nairobi in East Africa, focused on support of the African Union Mission in Somalia (AMISOM).

United Nations Security Council Resolution 1863 of January 16, 2009, provided UNSOA with a mandate to deliver a logistics capacity support package to AMISOM critical in achieving its operational effectiveness and in preparation for a possible UN peacekeeping operation.

The logistics package consisted of equipment and mission support services normally provided for a United Nations peacekeeping operation of the same size, and aimed to assist AMISOM in its mandate to support the transitional governmental structures, implement a national security plan, train the Somali security forces (including the Somali Armed Forces), and to assist in creating a secure environment for the delivery of humanitarian aid.

UNSOA also liaised with the Nairobi-based United Nations Political Office for Somalia (UNPOS) in its goals of creating the necessary political and security conditions in Somalia for a stepped-up international engagement, and with other UN bodies.

UNSOA's logistics package was funded from United Nations assessed contributions and through a trust fund established during the Somalia donor conference in Brussels on 23 April 2009.

UNSOA was headquartered near the AMISOM Headquarters in Nairobi, Kenya, with logistics operations facilitated through Mombasa and Entebbe, Uganda.

UNSOA was succeeded by the United Nations Support Office for Somalia, providing support to additional organisations, circa 2016.
