= Arusha Accords (Burundi) =

Peace treaty that ended the Burundian Civil War

The Arusha Peace and Reconciliation Agreement, widely known as the Arusha Accords (French: Accords d'Arusha), was a transitional peace treaty signed on 28 August 2000 in Arusha, Tanzania, which brought the Burundian Civil War to an end between most armed groups.^{[a]} Negotiations for the agreement were mediated by former Tanzanian president Julius Nyerere from 1996 until his death in October 1999, and thereafter by former South African president Nelson Mandela.

The negotiation process lasted four years (1996-2000), with intense debates, walkouts, continued violence, and competing interests among the participating parties. The peace process was initially led by regional leaders, particularly Tanzania, which played a fundamental role in orchestrating and facilitating the talks. The regional dynamics of the Burundian Civil War was a driving factor for international intervention. Neighboring countries, including Tanzania, Uganda, and South Africa were concerned that continued instability in Burundi could spill over into their own territories, triggering further displacement of refugees and armed conflicts.

From the start, the negotiations were contested by the refusal of central rebel groups to participate, most notably Palipehutu-FNL and CNDD-FDD, who continued fighting during the diplomatic efforts.

Following Nyerere's death in 1999, former South African President Nelson Mandela became the new head mediator. During the negotiations, international actors, such as Western donor states and multilateral organizations, had significant influence on the negotiations. Belgium controversially pressured Mandela to remove references to its colonial responsibility for Burundi's ethnic conflict, relating to its role in the assassination of Prince Louis Rwagasore in 1961. Despite Burundians wishes to keep the references, Mandela removed them, citing the need for Belgian aid.

In June 2000, closed-door meetings were held in South Africa including both rebels and representatives of the Burundi government. Although the rebels wanted to renegotiate the agreement, the Burundi military elite struck a deal with South Africans over the ethnic balance in the transitional government and the army. On August 28 2000, the Arusha Peace and Reconciliation Agreement was officially signed by the then-government of Burundi, the National Assembly, and a coalition of 17 political parties. With two of the largest Hutu rebel groups, the CNDD-FDD and Palipehutu-FNL refusing to sign the accords, the full implementation of the accords was delayed. In December 2002, the CNDD-FDD signed a ceasefire agreement with the transitional government, signifying a major step toward peace. By 2003 the ceasefire agreement had proven to reduce violence among the 16 armed movement or political parties that signed the accord.

The accords were based on four points of agreement:

1. A power-sharing formula, based on an agreed formula of ethnic quotas in politics
2. Representation of all parties in the state bureaucracy
3. Constitutional restrictions to prevent any single party becoming excessively powerful
4. Pathways to integrate former rebels and minority groups in the Burundian armed forces.

The United Nations played a role in monitoring the implementation of the accords. On May 21, 2004, the UN Security Council adopted Resolution 1545, establishing the United Nations Operation in Burundi (ONUB) to surveil the ceasefire. The mission deployed 5,650 military personnel as well as military observers and staff. The mission had also included troops from Ethiopia, Mozambique, and South Africa.

On 7 September 2006, the last rebel group Palipehutu-FNL signed an agreement for an immediate cessation of hostilities, further advancing the peace process.

The central tenets of the Arusha Accords were subsequently added to the 2005 Constitution of Burundi.

The core framework of the Arusha Accords was a power-sharing agreement designed to ensure ethnic and political inclusion. The Accords recommended a 60 percent Hutu and 40 percent Tutsi ratio in the Cabinet, with at least 30 percent of minister positions reserved for women. Parties securing 5 percent or more of the national vote are qualified to join a coalition government, ensuring greater participation amongst diverse groups. While the Arusha Accords did not explicitly detail ethnic quotas for the National Assembly, Burundi's constitution later formalized a 60-40 Hutu-Tutsi balance. Furthermore, the Senate was designed to include two members per province: one Hutu and one Tutsi. Key votes in the National Assembly required a two-thirds majority, helping to ease Tutsi concerns about Hutu majority rule. The Accords also mandated equal representation of Hutu and Tutsi in the upper rankings of both the military and police, with the aim to prevent ethnic dominance or ethnically driven military operations.

The long term legacy of the Arusha accords remains contested. Over time, the CNDD-FDD increasingly sought to weaken the Arusha framework, resulting in the third term crisis of 2015 which weakened the power-sharing mechanisms established by the agreement. Since 2015, the Arusha Accords have become increasingly irrelevant in Burundi governance.

== Notes ==
a. Further parties that had not participated in the talks continued to fight. CNDD-FDD continued fighting until a separate ceasefire agreement was reached in 2002 and Palipehutu-FNL reached a further ceasefire agreement in 2006.
