= CANADEM =

- Founded: 1996 by Global Affairs Canada
- Type: Non-profit, government-related organizations
- Location(s): Headquarters in Ottawa, and representatives in London, Geneva and New York City;
- Services: Database/roster of screened civilian experts for International Agencies, Governments and other non-profit organizations
- Fields: Human rights, elections, international development, humanitarian response, peacebuilding
- Members: 25,000+
- Website: http://www.canadem.ca

CANADEM is an Ottawa based non-profit, government-related organization established in 1996 with funding from Global Affairs Canada. Its main purpose is to bolster peace, order, and good governance efforts by connecting international agencies (UN, Organization for Security and Co-operation in Europe, Organization of American States, etc.) to civilian experts. Originally designed as Canada's national roster of civilian experts, CANADEM is now the largest roster of screened international civilian experts in the world. This non-profit Roster of International Experts enables international agencies, governments, and other non-profit organizations to rapidly connect with qualified professionals. The U.S. State Department's Office for Reconstruction and Stabilization lists CANADEM as one of its International Partners in peacebuilding.

CANADEM is an official partner of UN Office for the Coordination of Humanitarian Affairs through its Procap Program. A similar partnership exists between UNICEF and CANADEM for emergency surge deployments.

== Roster ==
Main characteristics of CANADEM are:

- Over 25,000 civilian experts skilled in human rights, civil society democratization, elections, rule of law, gopeacebuildingnstruction, security, and admin-logistics. Roster experts represent over 60 different languages, and, drawing upon Canada's multicultural diversity, as many countries of origin.
- Responds to staffing requests for peace, governance or other missions from the UN, the OSCE, other international organizations, and non-profit organizations. In an emergency, CANADEM can forward candidates within 48 to 72 hours. Many can deploy within 7 to 10 days.
- It is the only international expert roster in the world accessible to the international non-profit peacebuilding community, able to respond quickly to crises situations that would benefit from the rapid deployment of field experts.
- Has recruited over 2,500 experts for UN, OSCE, and other missions in Afghanistan, Sudan, Haiti, Serbia, East Timor, Sierra Leone, Kosovo, Bosnia, Croatia, the Democratic Republic of Congo, Ukraine, and many other countries.

Built as a rapid reaction mechanism, CANADEM can identify field seasoned experts for international emergencies in 48 to 72 hours.

CANADEM provides additional support to the Canadian government and various international organizations to address recruitment problems such as gender inequalities or geographical misrepresentation of its personnel.

After the events of September 11, and the increased need of the Canadian Government to build up its counter-terrorism capacity, CANADEM provided assistance in counter-terrorism capacity building by establishing a sub-roster of registrants with significant counter-terrorism capacity building expertise.

== How are experts selected? ==
CANADEM provides screened short-lists of experts.

CANADEM maintains regularly updated personal and professional information and advance-screens its experts to a 'short-list' standard. Once technical skills are confirmed, CANADEM screening concentrates on critically important interpersonal skills and personal capacity including an individual's abilities to effectively work in international field missions: Do they work well in teams? Do they handle stress in the field well? Are they flexible and able to handle uncertainty?

CANADEM claims to determine this information from a three-step, incremental screening process:

- Preliminary screening of résumés and other self-stated skills when an expert first registers with CANADEM.
- Advanced screening where confidential referee evaluations are assessed by sectoral experts.
- Position screening where CANADEM staff match position criteria to the skills and experience of Roster experts.

Position screening utilizes a number of skills inventories – general, police, legal and governance as well as the full resume of the individual registrants.

== CANADEM IFEX Program ==
CANADEM's IFEX Program (International Field Experience Program) is a facet of CANADEM that helps young Canadian professionals launch their international careers. If the participant can fund their way, IFEX will place the participant with a host agency that works within the participant's regional and sectoral interest. Over 90% of the participants find relevant follow-on employment through this method.

Placements include:

- Interview – Selection Board – Placement Search;
- Pre-departure briefing session;
- Minimum six months overseas posting;
- Ongoing reporting and contact with CANADEM;
- End-of-placement debriefing and follow-on employment assistance.

To be eligible to apply, applicants must be:

- A Canadian citizen or permanent resident;
- Available for the duration of the placement (at least six months);
- Able to meet the financial requirements of the program;
- A university graduate;
- Have excellent interpersonal skills and sound writing skills.
