= National Liberation Front (Burundi) =

Political party in Burundi

National Liberation Front French: Front de Libération Nationale
- Leader: Joseph Karumba
- Founded: 1980s
- Preceded by: Umbumwé
- Headquarters: Mpanda (1990s)
- Paramilitary wing: People's Armed Forces (defunct)
- Ideology: Hutu Power (historically); Hutu interests
- Colours: Green

The National Liberation Front (French: Front de libération nationale, or FROLINA) is an ethnically Hutu political party in Burundi that was formerly active as militant rebel group before and during the Burundian Civil War.

== History ==
Originally known as Umbumwé ("Solidarity"), FROLINA was founded in the mid-1980s by Joseph Karumba, a former schoolteacher and ex-member of the National Forces of Liberation (Parti pour la libération du peuple Hutu, PALIPEHUTU). Composed of militant Hutu refugees from Burundi, the group launched its first insurgent attack on the Burundian military in Mabandal on 13 August 1990. Afterwards, Karumba was repeatedly arrested in his country of exile, Tanzania, and the local authorities attempted to suppress his small militant group. From 1992, however, the Tanzanian government decided to tolerate FROLINA's activities, and granted Karumba asylum.

From their bases in Tanzania, the FROLINA's militant wing, the People's Armed Forces (Forces armées du peuple, FAP) waged a low-level guerrilla war against the Burundian government. Their operations were concentrated on the country's south, especially the area around Nyanza Lac. Overall, Karumba's group remained a "minor" force compared to other Hutu rebel movements such as the National Council for the Defense of Democracy – Forces for the Defense of Democracy (Conseil National Pour la Défense de la Démocratie – Forces pour la Défense de la Démocratie, or CNDD–FDD) and PALIPEHUTU-FNL during the Burundian Civil War. Like most other Hutu insurgent groups, FROLINA was "militantly racist" and desired the extermination or at least marginalization of all Burundian Tutsi. FROLINA mostly ceased its attacks in 1998. After talks took place between Burundian President Pierre Buyoya and Karumba, the party signed the Arusha Accords in August 2000. It thereby agreed to a ceasefire and an eventual integration into the Burundian military as part of a power-sharing deal.

Though part of FROLINA refused to agree to the Arusha Accords, and continued its insurgency, the rest of the party adhered to the ceasefire. Four FROLINA members became part of the Transitional National Assembly of late 2001, and the party demobilized its paramilitary forces in 2005. Its importance declined afterward, however, with FROLINA gaining less than 1% of the vote in the 2010 Burundian communal elections.
