= Burundian Civil War =

Inter-ethnic conflict within Burundi from 1993 to 2005

- Part of the spillovers of the Rwandan genocide, First and Second Congo Wars
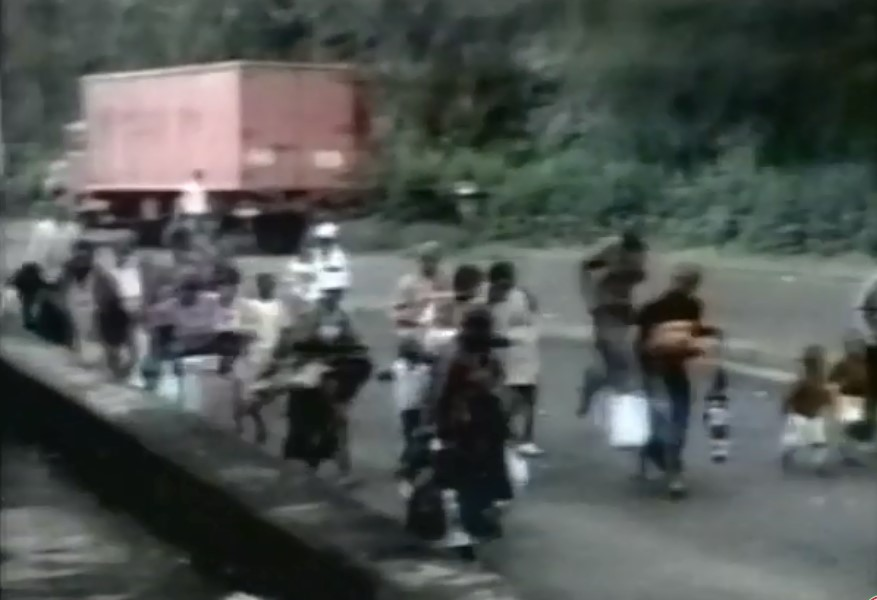
- People fleeing during 1993 Burundian genocide that marked the civil war's start
Date	21 October 1993 – 15 May 2005 (11 years, 6 months, 3 weeks and 3 days)
Location	Burundi; Zaire/DR Congo
Result	Arusha Accords (2000)

Belligerents
Burundi: Armed forces; Guardians of the Peace; "Abajeunes"; Supported by: RPF (Rwanda) International peacekeepers: AMIB (2003–04); ONUB (from 2004)	Ethnic Hutu rebels: CNDD-FDD; PALIPEHUTU-FNL (Note: The PALIPEHUTU-FNL split into several factions in course of the civil war. The political and militant wings of the party separated in 1999, while the militant wing subsequently divided into FNL-Kabura, FNL-Rwasa, and FNL-Icanzo. Most of the FNL signed a peace agreement with the Burundian government in May 2005, but several dissident elements of the FNL continued to fight until 2009.); FROLINA; Hutu militias and youth gangs: Inziraguhemuka; Intagoheka; "Chicago Bulls"; ALiR; FDLR; Mai-Mai; Supported by: Zaire (until 1996); Tanzania; DR Congo (2000s)	Tutsi militants: Burundian military factions; Sans Echec; Sans Défaite; Sans Pitié; Sans Capote; Imbogaraburundi; PA-Amasekanya; Supported by: RPF (Rwanda)

Commanders and leaders
Sylvie Kinigi; Cyprien Ntaryamira X Sylvestre Ntibantunganya; Pierre Buyoya; Domitien Ndayizeye; Jean Bikomagu	CNDD-FDD: Léonard Nyangoma; Jean-Bosco Ndayikengurukiye; Pierre Nkurunziza; Évariste Ndayishimiye; PALIPEHUTU-FNL: Kabora Kossan; Agathon Rwasa; Alain Mugabarabona; FROLINA: Joseph Karumba	Committee of Public Salvation (1993); Diomède Rutamucero (PA-Amasekanya)

Strength
Gov. forces: 6,000 (1993); 40,000 (2000); AMIB: 2,870 ONUB: 6,095	c. 11,000 (CNDD-FDD); 2,000–3,000 (PALIPEHUTU-FNL)	Unknown

Casualties and losses
- c. 300,000 killed in total

The Burundian Civil War was a civil war in Burundi lasting from 1993 to 2005. The civil war was the result of longstanding ethnic divisions between the Hutu and the Tutsi ethnic groups. The conflict began following the first multi-party elections in the country since its independence from Belgium in 1962, and is seen as formally ending with the swearing-in of President Pierre Nkurunziza in August 2005. Children were widely used by both sides in the war. The estimated death toll stands at 300,000.

== Background ==
Location of Burundi in Central Africa

Before becoming subject to European colonial rule, Burundi was governed by an ethnic Tutsi monarchy, similar to that of its neighbor Rwanda. German, and subsequently Belgian, colonial rulers found it convenient to govern through the existing power structure, perpetuating the dominance of the Tutsi minority over the ethnic Hutu majority. The Belgians generally identified the ethnic distinctions in Burundi and Rwanda with the following observations: the Twa who were short, the Hutu who were of medium height and the Tutsi who were tallest among them. Those individuals who owned more than ten cows were normally described as Tutsi.

Burundi became independent in 1962, breaking from a colonial federation with Rwanda. The independent country initially preserved its monarchy. The country's first multi-party national elections were held in June 1993. These elections were immediately preceded by 25 years of Tutsi military regimes, beginning with Michel Micombero, who had led a successful coup in 1966 and replaced the monarchy with a presidential republic. Under the Micombero regime, the minority Tutsi generally dominated governance. In 1972, Hutu militants organized and carried out systematic attacks on ethnic Tutsi, with the declared intent of annihilating the whole group. The military regime responded with large-scale reprisals targeting Hutus. The total number of casualties was never established, but estimates for the Tutsi genocide and the reprisals on the Hutus together are said to exceed 100,000. As many refugees and asylum-seekers left the country for Tanzania and Rwanda.

The last of the coups was in 1987 and installed Tutsi officer Pierre Buyoya. Buyoya attempted to institute a number of reforms to ease state control over media and attempted to facilitate a national dialogue. Instead of helping the problem, these reforms instead served to inflame ethnic tensions as hope grew among the Hutu population that the Tutsi monopoly was at an end. Local revolts subsequently took place by Hutu peasants against several Tutsi leaders in northern Burundi; these Hutu militias killed hundreds of Tutsi families in the process. When the army came to quell the uprising, they in turn killed thousands of Hutu, leading to an estimated death toll of between 5,000 and 50,000. A low-level insurgency developed, and the first Hutu rebel groups were formed. Most notable among these were Party for the Liberation of the Hutu People – National Forces of Liberation (Parti pour la libération du peuple Hutu – Forces nationales de libération, PALIPEHUTU-FNL) and National Liberation Front (Front de libération nationale, FROLINA) which had been active from the 1980s. Of the two, PALIPEHUTU-FNL was much more powerful than FROLINA, but also suffered from more internal divisions. When a democratic transition began in Burundi in the early 1990s, the historical core leadership of PALIPEHUTU decided to cooperate with the Hutu-dominated Front for Democracy in Burundi (Front pour la démocratie au Burundi, FRODEBU) party and to peacefully participate in politics. Radical members of PALIPEHUTU-FNL disagreed with this decision. In contrast, FROLINA was firmly unified under the command of Joseph Karumba, but always remained a rather weak and marginal group.

== War ==
=== 1993 coup and start of the conflict ===
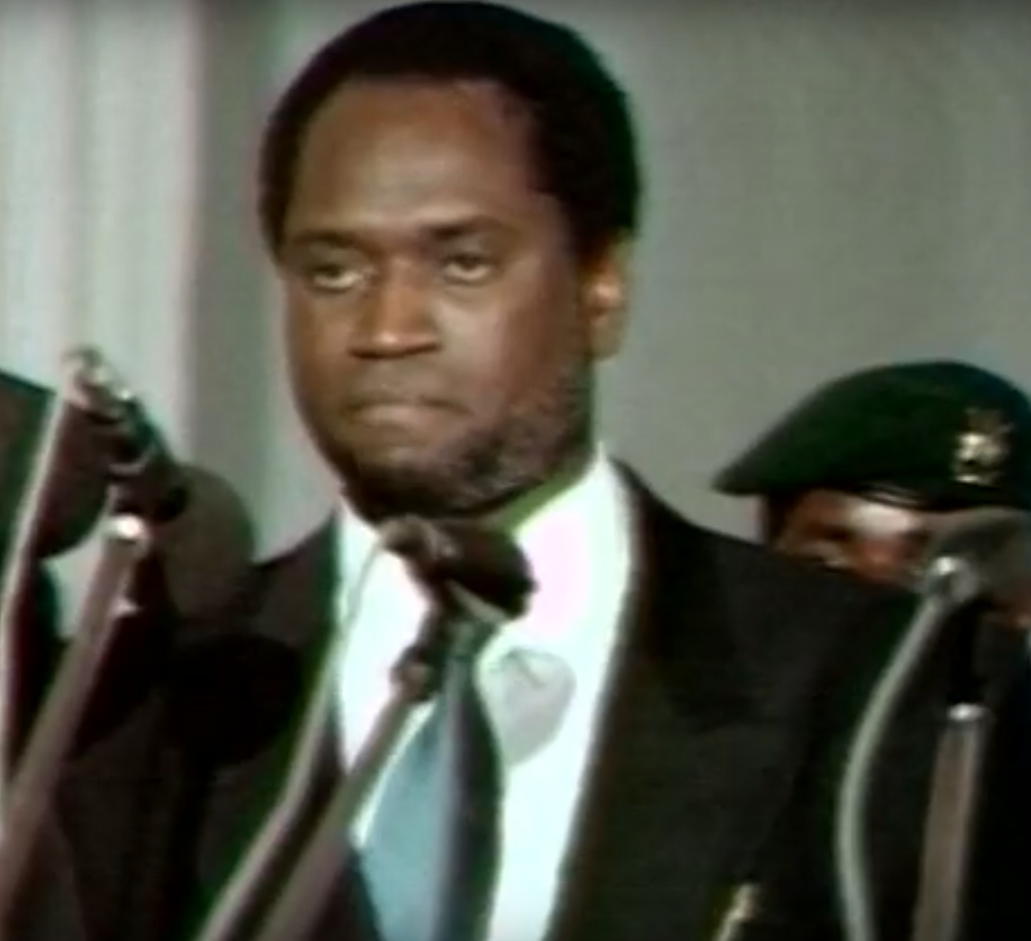
The death of President Melchior Ndadaye (pictured 1993) was one of the civil war's main causes

After decades of military dictatorships, the parliamentary and presidential elections of June and July 1993 were the first ones in Burundi to be free and fair. FRODEBU decisively defeated the largely Tutsi Union for National Progress (Union pour le progrès national, UPRONA) of President Buyoya. Thus, FRODEBU leader Melchior Ndadaye became Burundi's first democratically elected Hutu president. His tenure was wrought with problems from the beginning. Though PALIPEHUTU's leadership decided to cooperate with Ndadaye's new government, its military chief commander Kabora Kossan refused to end the insurgency. He and his followers split from PALIPEHUTU-FNL, and from then on simply called themselves "National Forces of Liberation" (FNL). For Kossan and his men the only option was to continue to fight until all Tutsi in Burundi were dead, removed or fully disempowered. Nevertheless, Ndadaye's government was more threatened by Tutsi extremists than by radical Hutu groups: The latter were still rather weak, whereas the former controlled much of Burundi's military. The political situation escalated when Tutsi extremist army officers launched a coup on 21 October. Supported by about half of the armed forces, the putschists murdered Ndadaye alongside other leading FRODEBU members, and declared a new regime. However, the military government was destabilized from the beginning, as it faced internal chaos and opposition by foreign powers.

As a result of President Ndadaye's murder, violence and chaos broke out all over Burundi. Hutu attacked and killed many UPRONA supporters, most of them Tutsi but also some Hutu, while the putschists and allied Tutsi groups assaulted Hutu and FRODEBU sympathizers. Many civilians banded together in local militias to defend themselves, but these groups quickly became proactive as well, carrying out attacks and mass killings against each other. Urban street gangs, many of which had been biethnic before 1993, split along ethnic lines and began to work for extremist politicians. They received money and guns, and in return demonstrated, and murdered on the orders of the Tutsi and Hutu parties. An estimated 50,000 to 100,000 people died within a year about as many Hutu as Tutsi. As result of this chaos and international pressure, the putschists' regime collapsed, and power was returned to a FRODEBU-dominated civilian government.

The mass killings consequently abated, and the country was somewhat restabilized by the end of 1993. The coup and subsequent ethnic violence had however deeply affected the country. The Tutsi extremists in the military were still present, and though they had given up outright power for the time being, they continued to undermine the civilian government in hopes of regaining full power in the future. The Hutu rebels believed that the coup had proven the impossibility of negotiations, and regarded the new Hutu-dominated civilian government as mere "stooges" of the old regime. They consequently fully resumed their insurgency. Furthermore, radicals among the Tutsi civil society regarded FRODEBU as génocidaires, believing that the party had initiated the anti-Tutsi mass killings following the 1993 coup. They thus organized demonstrations and strikes to bring down what they considered a criminal regime.

=== Decline of state authority, 1994–1996 ===
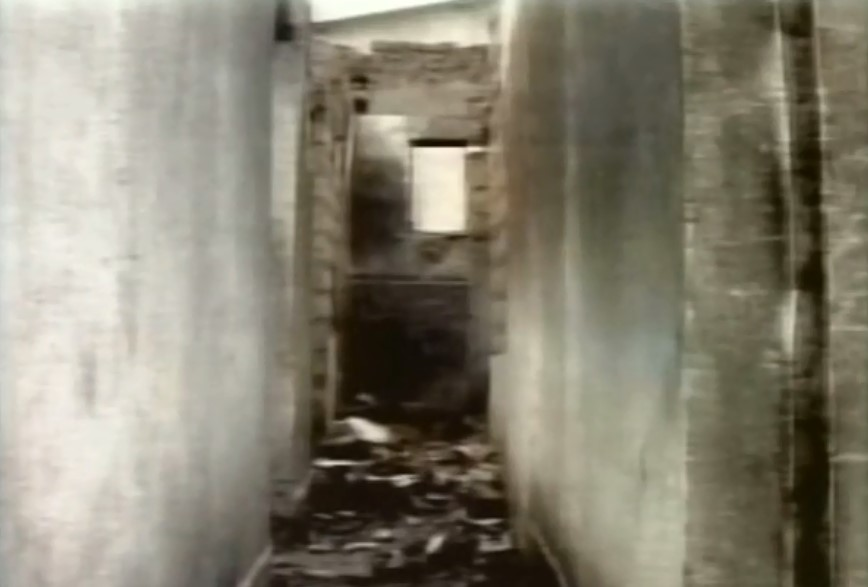
Building torched during the 1993 genocide

A succession of bi-ethnic governments attempted to stabilize the country from early 1994 to July 1996, but all failed. Tutsi extremists in the army continued to undermine any attempt of FRODEBU to consolidate power, and parts of FRODEBU decided in early 1994 that compromise was no longer possible. Minister of Interior Léonard Nyangoma led a FRODEBU faction into armed rebellion, creating the National Council for the Defense of Democracy–Forces for the Defense of Democracy (Conseil national pour la défense de la démocratie – Forces pour la défense de la démocratie, CNDD-FDD). Nyangoma's group consequently became the most important Hutu rebel group, though PALIPEHUTU-FNL and FROLINA continued to be active. PALIPEHUTU-FNL was weakened by further rifts, and would fracture into numerous smaller factions over disagreements on negotiations and leadership during the civil war. With the exception of the notably moderate CNDD-FDD, all Hutu militias embraced the radical Hutu Power ideology that desired for the extermination of all Burundian Tutsi.

The Hutu insurgents received support by the neighboring countries of Zaire and Tanzania, both of which allowed the rebels to set up bases on their territories from where they could launch raids into Burundi. The reasons for which they supported the insurgents differed greatly: Zairean President Mobutu Sese Seko believed that he could gain political leverage by harboring Rwandan and Burundian Hutu militants and refugees. They would suppress anti-Mobutu groups in Zaire, and give him something to bargain with the international community which sought to resolve the Great Lakes refugee crisis. In contrast, leading Tanzanian statesman Julius Nyerere wanted the region to be stabilized and pacified, and believed that the existence of Burundi and Rwanda as independent states posed a security problem by itself. Ultimately, he desired for these states to be annexed into Tanzania, therefore unifying all territory that had formerly comprised German East Africa. In the short term however, Nyerere believed that peace and order could only be achieved in Burundi through the inclusion of Hutus in the Burundian government and military.

While the country further descended into civil war, the political situation in Burundi deteriorated. Ndadaye's successor Cyprien Ntaryamira was assassinated in the same plane crash with Rwandan President Juvénal Habyarimana on 6 April 1994. This act marked the beginning of the Rwandan genocide, while in Burundi, the death of Ntaryamira exacerbated the violence and unrest, although there was no general massacre. Sylvestre Ntibantunganya was installed to a four-year presidency on April 8, but the security situation further declined. The influx of hundreds of thousands of Rwandan refugees and the activities of armed Hutu and Tutsi groups further destabilized the government. A coalition government, formed by the peaceful FRODEBU faction and UPRONA in September 1994, proved to be too weak and fractured to actually govern the country. With the civil authorities factually defunct, the military effectively held control of "what little state power remained".

At the same time, the power of non-state actors increased. Though many self-defense groups had been disbanded after 1993, others transformed into larger ethnic militias. These groups included unofficial paramilitary wings of Hutu and Tutsi parties, independent extremist militias, and militant youth gangs. Notable Tutsi factions included the Party for National Recovery's (Parti pour le redressement national, PARENA) Imbogaraburundi ("those-who-will-bring-Burundi-back"), the People's Reconciliation Party's (Parti de la réconciliation des personnes, PRP) Sans Echecs ("the unfailing ones"), and urban youth gangs like Sans Défaite ("the undefeated"), Sans Pitié ("the pitiless ones"), Sans Capote ("those-who-do-not-wear-condoms") which acted as forces for hire for various extremist Tutsi parties. Hutu parties like FRODEBU and FDD also raised supportive militias, Inziraguhemuka ("those-who-did-not-betray") and Intagoheka ("those-who-never-sleep") respectively, while the Hutu street gang "Chicago Bulls" from Bujumbura managed to expand into a small army. These militias undermined attempts by the government to restore peace. The Tutsi militias were often trained and armed by extremist factions in the Burundian military. With aid by the army, they defeated a number of Hutu militias, but also terrorized as well as displaced many Hutu civilians at Bujumbura and other cities in 1995/96.

Furthermore, the Tutsi Rwandan Patriotic Front (Front Patriotique Rwandais, RPF) defeated the Hutu regime of Rwanda in July 1994, ending the Rwandan Civil War and genocide. The military and paramilitary forces of old Rwandan Hutu regime (Ex-FAR/ALiR and Interahamwe) subsequently fled across the border into Zaire. There, they rebuilt their strength and launched an insurgency against the RPF. The Burundian CNDD-FDD and PALIPEHUTU-FNL soon allied themselves with the Rwandan Hutu factions which consequently aided them in attacking the Burundian military. And despite the CNDD-FDD's denial of these links, Filip Reyntjens assessed how northern Burundi's situation made Rwandan and Burundian Hutu rebel groups "objective allies" for geopolitical convenience, given an interest "in effectively controlling this area which could become a major base for an invasion of Rwanda by Rwandan exiles."

This situation, and the decline of state authority in Burundi, greatly alarmed the RPF-led government of Rwanda. The RPF feared that the collapse of the Burundian government would lead not only to the influx of possibly 500,000 Tutsi refugees into Rwanda, but also provide a new haven to the Rwandan Hutu insurgents. The Rwandan government thus began providing aid to the Burundian government from 1995. Rwandan troops would repeatedly cross the border, and attack Hutu refugee camps which harbored rebel forces in coordination with the Burundian military and local Tutsi militias. This development, according to Reyntjens, gave rise to the “conviction that transnational Hutu and Tutsi alliances fight each other.”

=== Buyoya's presidency ===
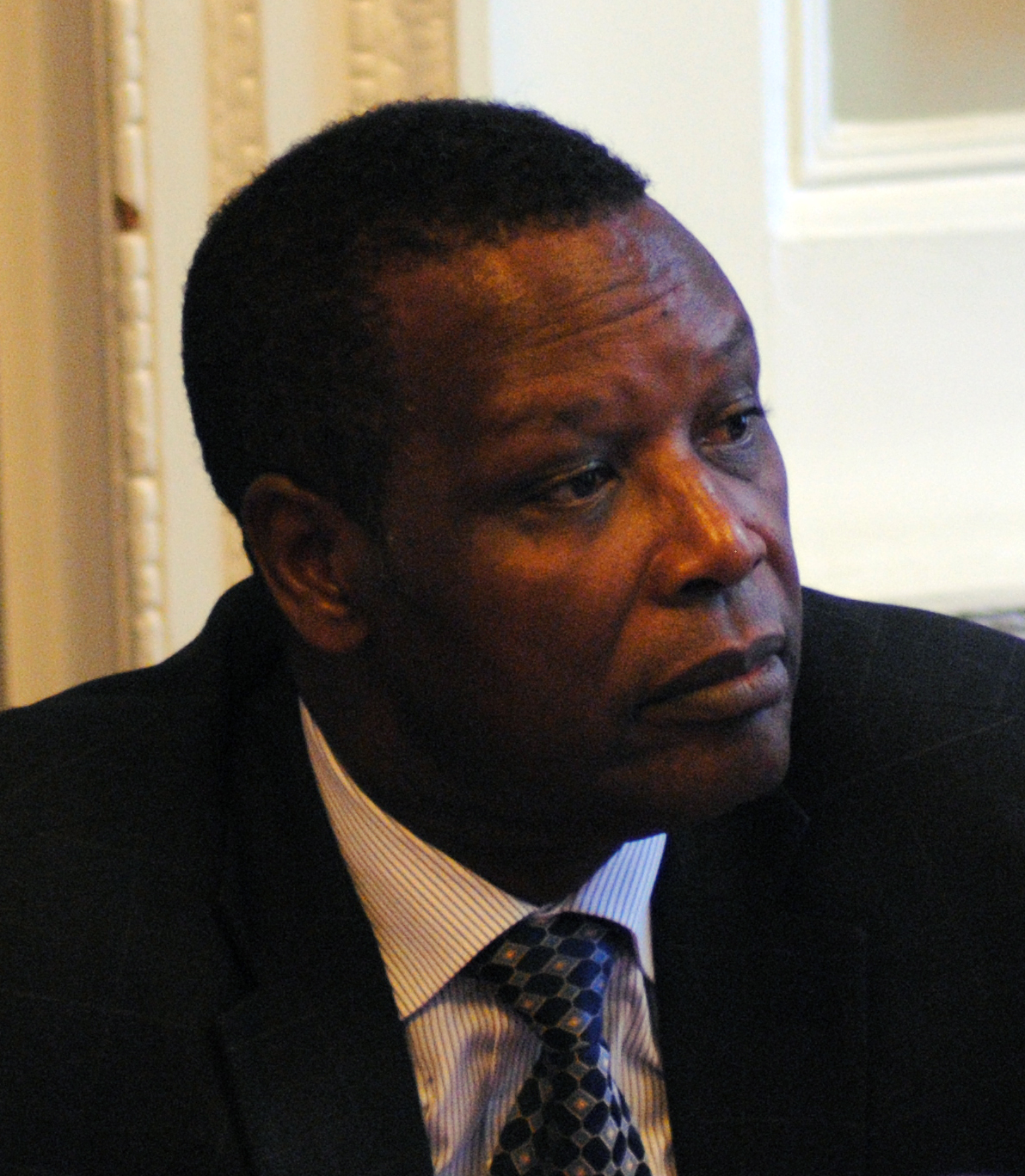
Ex-President Pierre Buyoya took over the Burundian government in the 1996 coup

The power-sharing political system of Hutu presidency and Tutsi military operated until 1996, when Tutsi Pierre Buyoya replaced the Hutu president in a coup, ostensibly to restore order. As the government had already been under de facto military control by this point, the coup mostly cemented the status quo. Upon assuming power, Buyoya took action to solve the war peacefully. He brought the radical Tutsi mostly under control, forcing their militias to integrate into the military or to be disbanded. Buyoya also attempted to open negotiations with the insurgents. Despite this, the coup also strengthened the Hutu rebel groups, as Buyoya's regime was regarded as illegitimate, and neighboring countries imposed an embargo on Burundi to protest against the coup. The civil war consequently escalated in intensity. Hutu rebels grew in power and killed about 300 Tutsi in a major attack on 20 July 1996. The increasing activity of the Hutu rebels in Burundi worried the Rwandan government, and influenced its decision to launch the First Congo War in late 1996 to overthrow President Mobutu of Zaire. By doing so, Rwanda hoped to eliminate Zaire as haven for various Hutu rebel groups; the CNDD-FDD had for example set up major bases at Uvira and Bukavu in eastern Zaire from where it launched raids into Burundi. Although Rwanda successfully overthrew Mobutu in a matter of months and replaced him with Laurent-Désiré Kabila, CNDD-FDD rebels still managed to significantly expand their operations in 1997. Infiltrating Bururi Province and Makamba Province in Burundi's south, they even attacked Rutovu, Buyoya's home town and center of Burundi's Tutsi elite at the time. In fact, elements of the new Congolese government under Laurent-Désiré's son Joseph Kabila came to support the Burundian insurgents by the early 2000s just as Mobutu had done previously.

In response to the deteriorating security situation, the government opted to organize a new paramilitary initiative. The military forced civilians to organize unarmed patrols to guard their communities against rebels. Though the state authorities claimed that these self-defense groups consisted of volunteers, civilians were generally coerced with threats of violence or fines. Most of the civilian militiamen were also poor Hutu, while Tutsi and wealthy or well connected Hutu were generally exempted of the patrol duties. As a result of demands by Tutsi extremist politicians, the military also set up a special, armed training program for Tutsi militiamen; Hutu were not allowed to join this training. As these initiatives failed to halt the growth of the rebel movements, the Burundian military eventually decided to set up a new militia in Cibitoke Province, which was initially simply known as "the young men" (les jeunes or abajeunes). In contrast to previous self-defense groups which were either unarmed or dominated by Tutsi, the abajeunes were both armed as well as mostly Hutu. They consisted of ex-rebels and former civilian patrolmen who had proven themselves to be trustworthy. Trained, armed and supplied by the military, the abajeunes were a success. The program was thus expanded to the entire country; the abajeunes in southern Burundi soon became known as the "Guardians of the Peace". Numbering 3,000 fighters by late 1997, they were decisive in keeping the insurgents at bay. Nevertheless, the number of war casualties further increased in 1998.

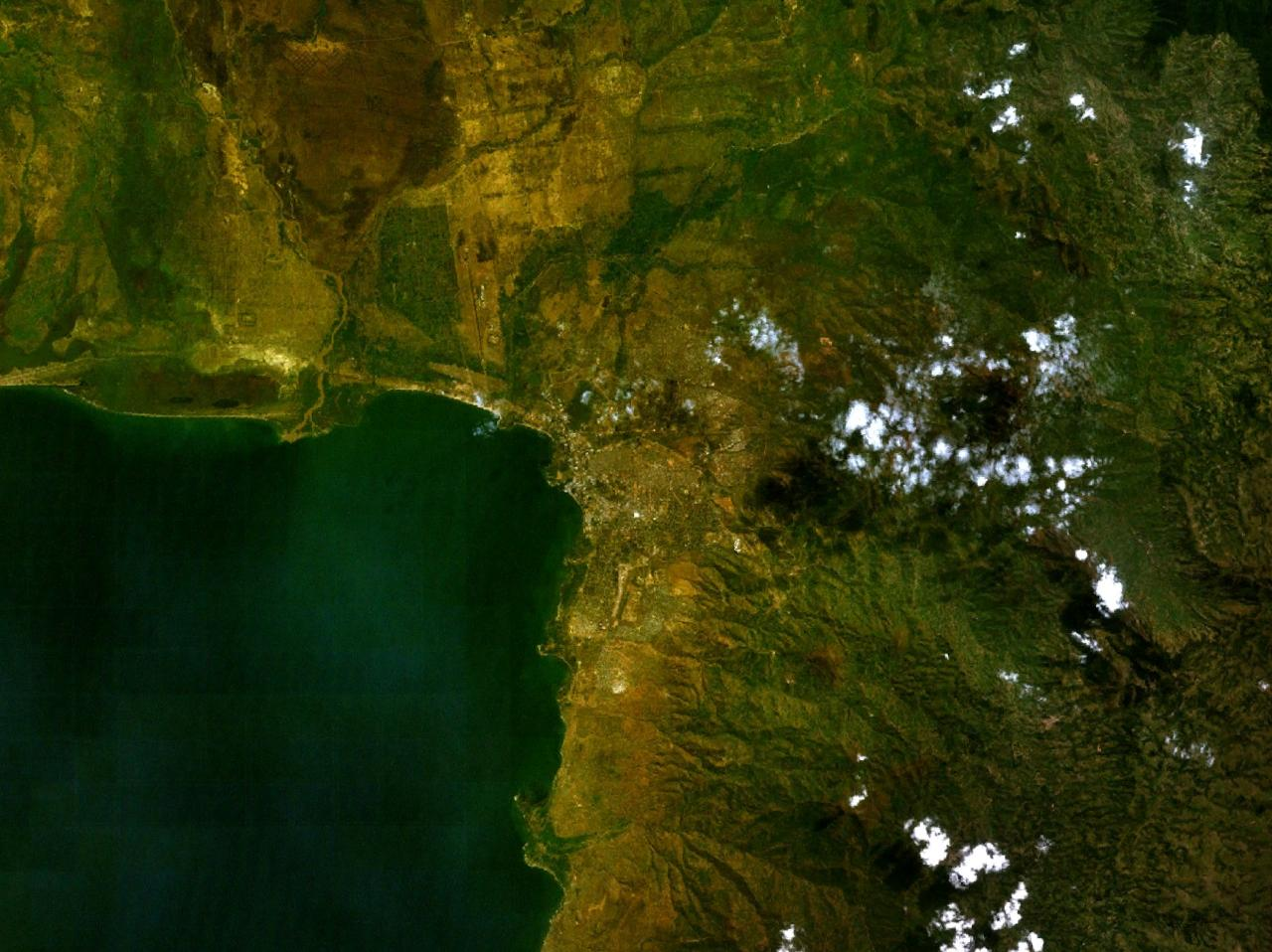
Hutu rebels regularly attacked Bujumbura (center of the map) from the forested mountains around it

In 1998, Buyoya and the opposition-led Hutu parliament reached an agreement to sign a transitional constitution, and Buyoya was sworn in as president. Formal peace talks with the rebels began at Arusha, Tanzania on 15 June 1998. The talks proved to be extremely difficult. Tanzanian ex-President Julius Nyerere acted as chief negotiator, and attempted to use caution and patience to achieve a solution. Upon Nyerere's death in 1999, South African President Nelson Mandela assumed responsibility for the peace talks. He and other heads of states in the region increased the pressure on Burundi's political leadership, pushing them to accept a government with participation of the rebel groups. Meanwhile, the civil war continued unabated, despite the efforts of the international community to facilitate the peace process. Though 1999 saw a reduction of fighting, the war again grew in intensity during the following two years. The Burundian military conducted a major offensive between October and December 2000, attempting to clear the Tenga forest near Bujumbura of insurgents. Though killing many rebel fighters, the operation was a failure, and the Tenga forest remained an insurgent stronghold. After bitter negotiations, an agreement was finally reached which established a transitional government, where the presidency and vice-presidency would be rotated every 18 months, sharing power between the Hutus and Tutsis. While the Burundian government and three Tutsi groups signed the Arusha Peace and Reconciliation Agreement in August 2000, two leading Hutu rebel groups refused to participate, and the fighting continued. The Arusha talks closed on November 30, 2000. Twenty Tutsis and one British woman were killed on 28 December 2000, in the Titanic Express massacre.

As the Arusha Accords were gradually implemented, severe challenges remained. Several times, the peace process almost broke down. Even though some moderate Tutsi parties had signed the peace deal, they remained opposed to some of its provisitions. Many Tutsi extremists refused to accept the Arusha Accords at all and refused any deal with the Hutu rebels. On 18 April 2001, an attempted coup against Buyoya failed. The putschists had wanted to prevent the power-sharing deal from coming into effect. A group of extremist Tutsis also attempted to revive the "Puissance Auto-défense-Amasekanya" (PA-Amasekanya) ethnic militia in mid-2000 to resist the peace agreement, but the leaders of this faction were promptly jailed. On 23 July 2001, it was agreed that the transitional government would be led by Buyoya for 18 months, followed by Domitien Ndayizeye, a Hutu and FRODEBU leader. Furthermore, a reform of the Burundian military would be implemented as soon as possible; the latter was especially contentious among the Tutsi.

The transitional government was implemented in October 2001. Buyoya was sworn in as internationally recognized president in November, while the first South African peacekeepers arrived in Burundi. Despite this, the main Hutu rebel groups, CNDD-FDD and FNL, still refused to sign a ceasefire agreement. Instead, fighting intensified, as the FNL launched numerous attacks around Bujumbura. Some 300 boys were kidnapped from Museuma College on November 9, 2001. The army responded by launching an offensive against the rebel bases in Tenga forest in December, claiming to have killed 500 insurgents. The September 9, 2002 Itaba massacre left hundreds of unarmed civilians dead.

After being promised to be included in the new government, two wings of CNDD-FDD finally agreed to a ceasefire and joined the Arusha agreement on 3 December 2002. The PALIPEHUTU-FNL refused to enter negotiations with the government and continued its struggle.

=== Presidency of Ndayizeye ===
On April 9, 2003, the force headquarters of the African Union Mission in Burundi was established in Bujumbura under South African Maj. Gen. Sipho Binda. As previously agreed, Buyoya stepped down, and Ndayizeye became President on 30 April 2003. In the following months, the CNDD-FDD faction of Pierre Nkurunziza was gradually integrated into the transitional government. A power-sharing deal was signed on 8 October 2003, and Nkurunziza was appointed Minister of State in charge of good governance and the general inspection of the state. On 18 October 2003, it was announced that the African Union Mission had reached full strength: 1,483 South Africans, 820 Ethiopians, and 232 personnel from Mozambique. As the Arusha Accords were implemented, the peace process made substantial progress. The reform of the military proved remarkably successful, and the integration of CNDD-FDD fighters went well. In contrast to earlier attempts to ensure peace which had been sabotaged by army extremists, most of the military had become wary of the constant civil war by the early 2000s. Its Tutsi and Hutu troops proved to be willing to stay loyal to the new government. The United Nations Operation in Burundi also helped to stabilize the country.

In spite of these successes, the war had not yet ended. The FNL remained the only active rebel group, but it was still a capable fighting force and continued its attacks. In July 2003, a rebel raid on Bujumbura left 300 dead and 15,000 displaced. On December 29, 2003, Archbishop Michael Courtney, the papal nuncio for the country, was murdered. Confronted by the newly unified Burundian military and the international peacekeepers, as well as a war-wary population, the abilities of the FNL to wage an insurgency gradually whittled down. By late 2004, it had just about 1,000 fighters left, and its area of operations had been reduced to just Bujumbura Rural Province. In August 2004, the FNL claimed responsibility for killing 160 Congolese Tutsi refugees in a United Nations camp at Gatumba near the Congo border in Burundi. The attack was strongly condemned by the U.N. Security Council, which issued a statement of outrage at the fact that "most of the victims were women, children and babies who were shot dead and burned in their shelters". The FNL attempted to deflect criticism by claiming that the victims had been Banyamulenge militants, but the Gatumba massacre proved to be a propaganda disaster. The group was consequently labelled as "terrorist" both internationally and in Burundi, weakening it politically. Confronted with its declining fortunes, the FNL signalled that it was willing to negotiate an end of its insurgency.

=== Final peace process ===
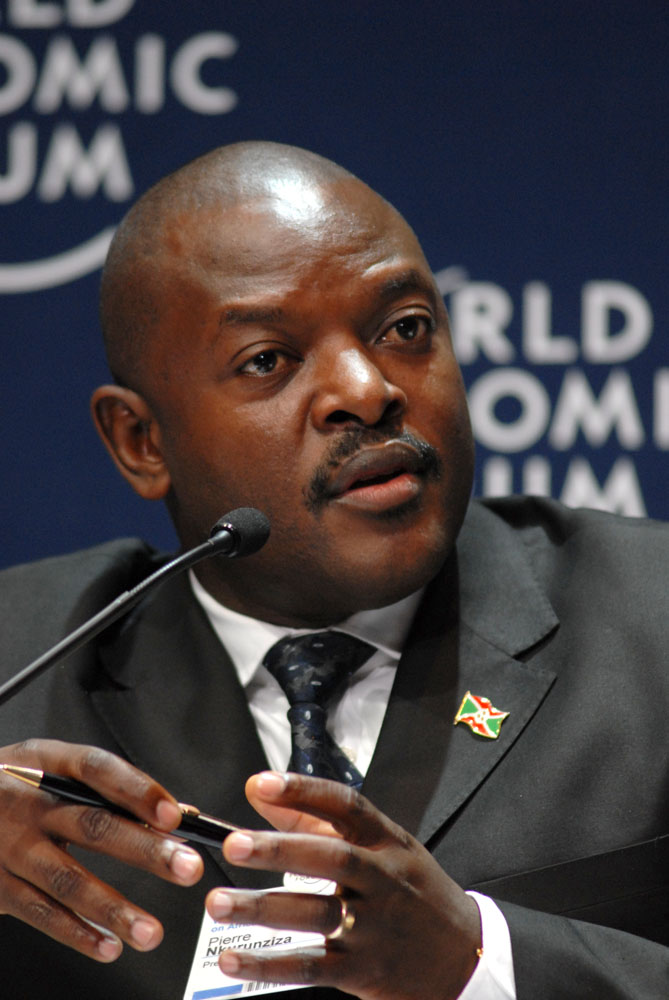
Pierre Nkurunziza was elected president in 2005

In 2005, many developments were made in the peace process. The president signed a law in January 2005 to initiate a new national army, consisting of Tutsi military forces and all but one of the Hutu rebel groups. The Constitution was approved by voters in a referendum—marking the first time Burundians had voted since 1994. They voted again in July during the parliamentary elections, postponed from November 2004, in which "the Government of Burundi and the Independent National Electoral Commission (Burundi)|Independent National Electoral Commission conducted a technically-sound election, carried out in an atmosphere of peace and security." The Forces for the Defense of Democracy (FDD) ended up winning the parliamentary elections. Several months later, Pierre Nkurunziza from the Hutu FDD group was elected as president by the two Hutu-dominated houses of parliament.

After 12 years of living with a midnight-to-dawn curfew, Burundians were free to stay out late when the curfew was lifted on April 15, 2006, for the first time since 1993. This signified the most stable point in Burundian civil affairs since the assassination of Hutu President Melchior Ndadaye and the beginning of the civil war.

Matters continued to look promising after Burundi's last rebel group, the FNL, signed a ceasefire deal in Tanzania, "solidifying the end of a 12-year civil war." As part of the agreement, members of the FNL were to be assembled, demobilized, and integrated into the national army. Dissident parts of the FNL, most notably the National Liberation Forces – Icanzo (FNL–Icanzo), continued their insurgency, however, and only surrendered later on. In mid-April 2008, FNL rebels shelled the then-capital, Bujumbura, while fighting killed at least 33.

== Use of child soldiers ==
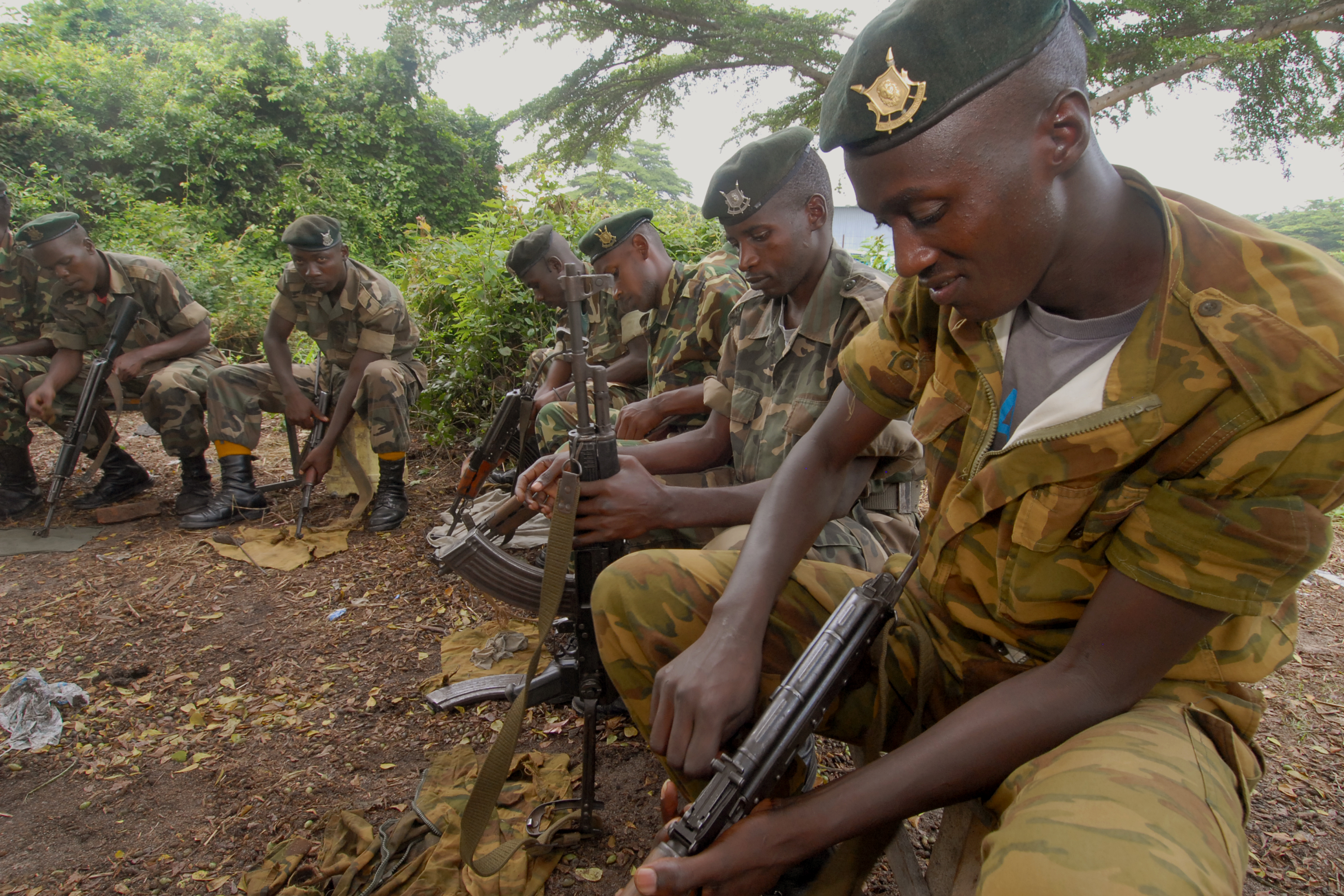
Burundian government soldiers in 2006, shortly after the conflict's end

Children were recruited and used extensively by both sides during the civil war of 1993–2005. The Burundian military regularly conscripted children between the ages of 7 and 16 for its militias, most importantly the Guardians of the Peace. It would threaten the parents with violence or fines to hand over their sons to the army, and the child soldiers themselves were often beaten during training. Thousands of child soldiers fought for the government in the civil war, though the exact number is not known. Hundreds were killed in combat. The Hutu rebels were also known to deploy large numbers of child soldiers; hundreds of child soldiers were in the FNL by 2004. As the Guardians of the Peace recruited ex-rebels into their ranks, some rebel child soldiers also fought for the government after their surrender or capture.

The recruitment of child soldiers by the military had been reduced by 2000. After the peace agreements brought the conflict to an end in 2005, the new constitution committed to not using children in direct combat. The parties to the conflict no longer recruited children in large numbers, but many remained active in the FNL, which had denounced the peace accord. By 2006, a reintegration program organized by UNICEF had led to the release of 3,000 children from the military and armed groups. According to Child Soldiers International:

The majority of those [children] who took part in the program returned to farm and fish in their local communities, but nearly 600 returned to school. Some 1,800 former child soldiers received occupational training. Health care was provided for those with special needs and psychosocial support was provided through individual and group meetings.

== Truth and Reconciliation Commission ==
In 2014 the Truth and Reconciliation Commission (TRC) was established to investigate crimes committed during ethnic violence since independence in 1962, overseen by Pierre Claver Ndayicariye.
