= United Nations Operation in Burundi =

United Nations military observation mission

- Abbreviation: ONUB
- Formation: 24 March 2005
- Type: Peacekeeping Mission
- Legal status: Completed
- Head: Carolyn McAskie (2004–2006); Nureldin Satti (2006–2007)
- Parent organization: United Nations Security Council
- Website: Official website

The United Nations Operation in Burundi (ONUB) was established by United Nations Security Council in May 2004 to ensure the continuation of the Arusha Peace and Reconciliation Agreement signed on 28 August 2000.

Furthermore, by the terms of Resolution 1545 which established the mission, it was authorized to use "all necessary means" to ensure the respect of ceasefire agreements, carry out disarmament and protect civilians under imminent threat of physical violence.

Initially, ONUB consisted of 5,650 military personnel, 120 civilian police, and support personnel in the form of 200 military observers and 125 military staff officers.

The mission ended 1 January 2007 when many of its functions were transferred to the United Nations Integrated Office in Burundi (BINUB).

== See also ==
- Burundi
- Burundi Civil War
- United Nations
- United Nations Security Council
