= United Nations Political Office for Somalia =

Former United Nations mission in Somalia

- Successor: United Nations Assistance Mission in Somalia
- Formation: 15 April 1995
- Dissolved: 2 June 2013
- Headquarters: Mogadishu, Somalia

The United Nations Political Office for Somalia (UNPOS) was special political mission by the United Nations in Somalia. It was established in 1995 due to instability in Somalia with the propose of promoting peace in the region. In 2012 its headquarters was moved Mogadishu after the area became more stable. Its duties were later transferred in 2013 to the United Nations Assistance Mission in Somalia.
