= National Liberation Forces – Icanzo =

Political party in Burundi

The National Liberation Forces-Icanzo (FNL-Icanzo) is a small political party in Burundi.

In 2005, the National Liberation Forces rejected the peace deals of the United Nations that led to democratic elections in Burundi notwithstanding its later tentative endorsement of them on 18 June 2006. On September 7, 2006 the group signed a ceasefire with the Government and as a result the groups 3000 fighters are to disarm. The FNL was the last major Hutu group to join the peace process.
