= National Forces of Liberation =

Political party and rebel group in Burundi

National Forces of Liberation Forces nationales de libération
- Abbreviation: FLN
- Chairperson: Jacques Bigirimana
- Founded: 1980
- Registered: 2008
- Ideology: Hutu nationalism Historical: Hutu Power
- Political position: Right-wing; Historical: Far-right
- Colors: Red, green
- Senate: 0 / 13
- National Assembly: 0 / 111

Party flag

Website
- www.fnl-burundi.org

The National Forces of Liberation (French: Forces nationales de libération, or FNL) is a political party and former rebel group in Burundi. An ethnic Hutu group, the party was previously known as the Party for the Liberation of the Hutu People (Parti pour la libération du peuple Hutu, or PALIPEHUTU) and adhered to a radical Hutu Power ideology, but since the mid- to late-2000s has moderated its stance and cooperated with the Tutsi-supported Union for National Progress party in opposition to the rule of Pierre Nkurunziza and the CNDD–FDD.

PALIPEHUTU was a participant in the Burundian Civil War. Its armed wing was the National Forces of Liberation (Forces nationales de libération, or FNL). It was led by Agathon Rwasa and was estimated to have around 3,000 combatants.

A dissident wing is led by Jean Bosco Sindayigaya.

== Formation ==
PALIPEHUTU was one of two movements that emerged from the MEPROBA (Mouvement des étudiants progressistes barundi), a leftist student organization created in exile in Belgium at the beginning of the 1970s following the ethno-political massacres of 1965 and 1969. In the aftermath of the1972 Ikiza, MEPROBA was divided over the iddue of whether to focus more on ethnic conflict or maintain a traditional Marxist analysis, and split into the TABARA (‘Come to my Rescue’) and UBU (Umugambwe wa’Bakozi Uburundi). TABARA was founded in Rwanda in 1979 and while still drawing from a Marxist framework, but increasingly emphasized Tutsi ethnic domination and was open to the possibility of armed struggle, unlike UBU. Despite its leftist slogans, TABARA received political support from the anti-communist Rwandan government, as seen by President Micombero's early departure from the 1979 France-Afrique summit in Kigali, after Rwandan President Habyarimana refused to crack down on TABARA, although later pressure saw many TABARA members seeking refuge in Tanzania.

PALIPEHUTU was founded in 1980 in Hutu refugee camps in Tanzania by former Burundian soldier Rémy Gahutu who was dissatisfied with the intellectuals of TABARA. PALIPEHUTU advocated armed struggle as the primary means of acchieving its goals and established its armed wing, the FNL, in 1983 with Ikiza survivor Donatien Misigaro as its first commander. Initial difficulties in beginning military operations led to the National Liberation Front (FROLINA) splitting from PALIPEHUTU in 1990.

The FNL launched its first attack on the night of November 23-24 1991 with disastrous results. Expected supplies had not reached key staging grounds and many FNL militants had been arrested in the lead-up. Nevertheless, coordinated attacks were launched in Bujumbura, Cibitoke and Kayanza. During this time, the new PALIPEHUTU chief, Etienne Karatasi was meeting with Burundian President Pierre Buyoya in Paris, a meeting brokered by Habyarimana. Survivors of the FNL led by Cossan Kabura split from the political wing of PALIPEHUTU in 1991, retaining the organization's name and emerging as the dominant faction. This faction would receive support from the Rwandan Government as the civil war intensified, with some FNL members even fighting against the RPF on the Byumba front.

The political wing of PALIPEHUTU was renamed the Party for the Liberation of People-Agakiza and was led by Etienne Karatasi.

Generally, PALIPEHUTU's support comes more from the central region of Muramvya and Lake Tanganyika, whereas the main Hutu political party CNDD derives its support from the southern Bururi region.

== Civil war ==
During the civil war, PALIPEHUTU-FNL was linked to the killing of Monsignor Michael Courtney, the Catholic Church's chief representative in Burundi, the Titanic Express massacre and the Gatumba massacre in which over 150 Banyamulenge Congolese refugees were killed.

PALIPEHUTU also fought in the Second Congo War alongside the Congolese army, the Army for the Liberation of Rwanda and the Mai-Mai against the Burundian army.

In 2002 PALIPEHUTU-FNL split into two factions, one led by Kabura and one by Agathon Rwasa. Rwasa accured the Tanzania-based Kabura of mismagement of party resources and of conducting secret meetings with Buyoya, who allegedly provided the former with funds.

Following the Gatumba massacre, the Great Lakes Peace Initiativedeclared PALIPEHUTU-FNL to be a terrorist organisation, and the South African President, Thabo Mbeki called on the International Criminal Court to prosecute.

PALIPEHUTU-FNL was the last Hutu rebel group to sign an agreement with the Burundi government, which it did in September 2006

Further agreements led to a final agreement in December 2008, according to which it also changed its name to remove "PALIPEHUTU" to leave only "FNL" as its name (as Burundian political parties may not refer to ethnicities in their names).

On May 15, 2009, UNICEF reported that 136 ex-FNL child soldiers returned to their communities in Burundi.
