= Deaths in August 1994 =

The following is a list of notable deaths in August 1994.

Entries for each day are listed alphabetically by surname. A typical entry lists information in the following sequence:

- Name, age, country of citizenship at birth, subsequent country of citizenship (if applicable), reason for notability, cause of death (if known), and reference.

== August 1994 ==
=== 1 ===
- Pierre Alleene, 85, French Olympic weightlifter (1936).
- Mario Baroni, 67, Italian racing cyclist.
- Harold Boardman, 87, British politician.
- Bernie James, 88, American baseball player (Boston Braves, New York Giants).
- George Malcolm Laws, 75, American folk music scholar.
- Romilly Lunge, 89, British film actor.
- Valery Yardy, 46, Soviet/Russian road cyclist and Olympian (1968, 1972).

=== 2 ===
- Eduardo Folle, 72, Uruguayan Olympic basketball player (1948).
- Bert Freed, 74, American actor, heart attack.
- Kelpo Gröndahl, 74, Finnish Olympic Greco-Roman wrestler (1948, 1952).
- W. Pat Jennings, 74, American politician, member of the United States House of Representatives (1955–1967).
- Dick Jones, 92, American baseball player (Washington Senators).

=== 3 ===
- Hoyt Franklin Clines, 37, American convicted murderer, execution by lethal injection.
- Wally Downer, 90, Canadian politician.
- Arie Richard Hanitzsch, 66, Brazilian Olympic diver (1952).
- James William Holmes, 37, American convicted murderer, execution by lethal injection.
- Hidalgo Moya, 74, American architect.
- Jim Reilly, 46, American football player (Buffalo Bills).
- Darryl Richley, 43, American convicted murderer, execution by lethal injection.
- Innokenty Smoktunovsky, 69, Soviet/Russian theater and film actor.
- Norm Stott, 90, Australian rules footballer.
- John Zenda, 50, American actor.

=== 4 ===
- Solomon Adler, 84, English-American economist and Soviet spy.
- Cyro dos Anjos, 87, Brazilian journalist, and writer.
- Thomas Fulton, 44, American conductor, kidney failure.
- Jürgen Jürgens, 68, German choral conductor and teacher.
- Art Lassiter, 66, American singer, cancer.
- Steve Myhra, 60, American gridiron football player (Baltimore Colts), heart attack.
- Giovanni Spadolini, 69, Italian politician and statesman, cancer.
- Rolf Greger Strøm, 54, Norwegian Olympic luger (1964, 1968).

=== 5 ===
- Louis H. Bean, 98, American economic and political analyst.
- Clive Caldwell, 83, Australian flying ace during World War II.
- Cornelia C. Cameron, 83, American geologist.
- Alain de Changy, 72, Belgian racing driver.
- Terry Hibbitt, 46, English football player, cancer.
- Solomon Kullback, 87, American cryptanalyst and mathematician.
- Paul Sæthrang, 76, Norwegian footballer.
- Frederick Wheeler, 80, Australian public servant.
- Muhammad Yaqub Ali, 82, Pakistani judge.

=== 6 ===
- Henri Arends, 73, Dutch conductor.
- Steven F. Arnold, 51, American visual artist and protégé of Salvador Dalí, AIDS.
- Max Coley, 67, American football coach.
- Stephen Farrer, 86, South African cricketer.
- Domenico Modugno, 66, Italian singer, songwriter, actor, and politician, heart attack.
- Jacques Pelzer, 70, Belgian musician.
- Evan Vogds, 71, American gridiron football player (Chicago Rockets, Green Bay Packers).

=== 7 ===
- Ignazio Balsamo, 81, Italian actor.
- Gérard Chapdelaine, 59, Canadian politician, member of the House of Commons of Canada (1962–1965).
- Rubi Dalma, 88, Italian actress.
- Liu Haisu, 98, Chinese painter and art educator.
- Leon Goldsworthy, 85, Australian bomb and mine specialist during World War II.
- Robert Hutton, 74, American actor, pneumonia.
- Larry Martyn, 60, British actor (Are You Being Served?, The Dick Emery Show, Whoops Baghdad).
- Bob Wells, 49, American football player (San Diego Chargers).

=== 8 ===
- Feroza Adam, 32, South African political activist, injuries sustained in a road accident.
- Iberê Camargo, 79, Brazilian painter.
- Robin Cavendish, 64, British advocate for disabled people and medical aid developer.
- Serge Leclaire, 70, French psychiatrist and psychoanalyst.
- Leonid Leonov, 95, Soviet/Russian novelist and playwright.
- Frank Negri, 76, Australian rules footballer.
- Morde_kay Seter, 78, Russian-Israeli composer.
- Ada Smith, 91, British Olympic gymnast (1928).

=== 9 ===
- Howard W. Carson, 84, American politician.
- Aldo Donelli, 87, American football player and coach, and soccer player.
- William Galbraith, 87, United States Navy admiral, gymnast and Olympic medalist (1932).
- Klaus Holighaus, 54, German glider designer and pilot, gliding accident.
- Olle Johansson, 66, Swedish swimmer, water polo player and Olympian (1948, 1952).
- Tony Kaska, 83, American football player (Detroit Lions, Brooklyn Dodgers).
- Helena Rasiowa, 77, Polish mathematician.

=== 10 ===
- Biswamoy Biswas, 71, Indian ornithologist.
- Marie Dollinger, 83, German track and field athlete and Olympian (1928, 1932, 1936).
- Heinz Hügelshofer, 75, Swiss Olympic speed skater (1948).
- Eliyahu Lankin, 79, Israeli zionist activist, Irgun member and politician.
- Doug Lewis, 73, Canadian ice hockey player (Montreal Canadiens).
- Vladimir Melanin, 60, Soviet/Russian biathlete and Olympian (1960, 1964).
- Kay Petre, 91, Canadian motor racer.
- Horrie Stanway, 85, Australian rules footballer.
- Jessie Sumner, 96, American politician, member of the United States House of Representatives (1939–1947).

=== 11 ===
- Stanislav Chekan, 72, Soviet/Russian actor of theater and cinema.
- Gordon Cullen, 80, British architect and urban designer.
- Peter Cushing, 81, English actor (Star Wars, Dracula, The Curse of Frankenstein), prostate cancer.
- Bert Graham, 73, Australian rules footballer.
- Marko Jozinović, 74, Bosnian Croat catholic archbishop.
- David Vern Reed, 79, American writer.

=== 12 ===
- Wing-tsit Chan, 92, Chinese scholar and professor.
- Gene Cherico, 59, American jazz double-bassist.
- Barbara Grabowska, 39, Polish actress, fall from train.
- Dale Hamilton, 74, American basketball player.
- Anton Giulio Majano, 85, Italian screenwriter and film director.
- Steve Puidokas, 39, American college basketball player (Washington State Cougars).
- Barry Shipman, 82, Canadian-American screenwriter.
- B. K. Tikader, 66, Indian arachnologist and zoologist.
- Harold Tower, 83, American Olympic rower (1932).
- Włodzimierz Źróbik, 68, Polish Olympic bobsledder (1956).

=== 13 ===
- Raymond Gallois-Montbrun, 75, French violinist and composer.
- Valentin Kuzin, 67, Soviet/Russian ice hockey player and Olympian (1956).
- Simon Robert Naali, 28, Tanzanian marathon runner and Olympian (1992), traffic collision.
- J. A. O. Preus II, 74, American Lutheran pastor, professor, and author.
- Rao Gopal Rao, 57, Indian actor, producer, and politician.
- Manfred Wörner, 59, German politician and diplomat, colorectal cancer.

=== 14 ===
- Elias Canetti, 89, Bulgarian-Swiss-British novelist, playwright, and writer.
- Alice Childress, 77, American novelist, playwright, producer and actress, cancer.
- Stanisław Gucwa, 75, Polish politician and economist.
- Joan Harrison, 87, English screenwriter (Rebecca, Foreign Correspondent, Saboteur).
- Joe Palma, 89, American actor (The Three Stooges).
- Arthur Palmer, 82, British politician.
- Rajasri, 59, Indian lyricist, dialogue writer and music composer.

=== 15 ===
- Paul Anderson, 61, American weightlifter, strongman, powerlifter, and Olympian (1956) nephritis.
- Erik Anker, 90, Norwegian Olympic sailor (1928), and businessperson.
- Joe Brovia, 72, American baseball player (Cincinnati Redlegs), cancer.
- Syd Dale, 70, English music composer and arranger.
- Juan Martínez, 69, Spanish Olympic equestrian (1960).
- Shepherd Mead, 80, American writer.
- Joseph Palmer II, 80, American diplomat and State Department official.
- Steve Petro, 79, American gridiron football player (Brooklyn Dodgers).
- Kailash Sankhala, 69, Indian biologist and conservationist.
- Wout Wagtmans, 64, Dutch road bicycle racer.

=== 16 ===
- Rolando Aguirre, 90, Argentine Olympic sailor (1924).
- Wahbi al-Hariri, 80, Syrian-American artist, architect, archaeologist, and author.
- Francisco Antúnez, 71, Spanish football player.
- Tay Brown, 82, American college football player and coach.
- Harry Collier, 86, Australian rules footballer.
- John Doucette, 73, American actor (Cleopatra, True Grit, Patton).
- Ahmad Fardid, 85, Iranian philosopher and professor.
- Henry Geldzahler, 59, Belgian-American curator of contemporary art, liver cancer.
- Stan Devenish Meares, 88, Australian obstetrician and gynaecologist.
- Alan Nutter, 73, Australian rules footballer.

=== 17 ===
- Sig Andrusking, 81, American football player (Brooklyn Dodgers).
- Luigi Chinetti, 93, Italian-American racecar driver.
- Bennie Le Sueur, 77, Australian rules footballer.
- Cecil A. Partee, 73, American attorney and politician.
- Thomas Pollock, 69, Canadian ice hockey player and Olympian (1952), stroke.
- Jack Sharkey, 91, Lithuanian-American world heavyweight boxing champion.

=== 18 ===
- John Beavan, Baron Ardwick, 84, British journalist.
- Alfred Belzile, 86, Canadian politician, member of the House of Commons of Canada (1958–1963).
- Martin Cahill, 45, Irish criminal, homicide.
- Henri Calef, 84, French screenwriter and film director.
- Gottlob Frick, 88, German operatic bass.
- Yeshayahu Leibowitz, 91, Israeli Orthodox Jewish intellectual and polymath.
- Daltro Menezes, 56, Brazilian football manager.
- Charles Redland, 83, Swedish jazz saxophonist, bandleader, and composer.
- Omori Sogen, 90, Japanese Buddhist monk.
- Richard Laurence Millington Synge, 79, British biochemist and Nobel Prize laureate.
- Yuri Tsitsinov, 56, Soviet Russian ice hockey player and Olympian (1960).
- Vazgen I, 85, Romanian Catholicos of All Armenians.

=== 19 ===
- Louis de Froment, 72, French conductor.
- Ladislav Fuks, 70, Czech novelist and writer.
- Anthony Peter Khoraish, 86, Lebanese Maronite Patriarch of Antioch and the Whole Levant.
- Nancy Lancaster, 96, British interior designer.
- Otto-Iivari Meurman, 104, Finnish architect.
- Linus Pauling, 93, American chemist, peace activist, and author, prostate cancer.
- Robert Rozhdestvensky, 62, Soviet/Russian poet and songwriter, heart attack.

=== 20 ===
- Odessa Grady Clay, 77, Mother of boxing champion Muhammad Ali, cardiovascular disease.
- Hermann Hackmann, 80, German war criminal and SS captain during World War II.
- Revilo P. Oliver, 86, American university professor, suicide.
- Aleksandar Petrović, 65, Yugoslav/Serbian film director.
- Roy Simmons Sr., 92, American lacrosse coach.

=== 21 ===
- Albert Blaustein, 72, American civil rights and human rights lawyer.
- Rose Laub Coser, 78, German-American sociologist and social justice activist.
- Kathleen Frances Daly, 96, Canadian painter.
- Anita Lizana, 78, Chilean tennis player, stomach cancer.
- Danitra Vance, 40, American comedian and actress (Saturday Night Live), breast cancer.
- Luis Villodas, 76, Puerto Rican baseball player.

=== 22 ===
- Tadeusz Adamowski, 92, Polish-American ice hockey player and Olympian (1928).
- António de Almeida, 78, Portuguese Olympic equestrian (1952, 1956, 1960).
- Harry Gamage, 94, American football player and coach.
- Gilles Groulx, 62, Canadian film director.
- Allan Houser, 80, Chiricahua Apache sculptor, painter and illustrator.
- Gary Jasgur, 58, American child actor.
- André Rossi, 73, French politician.

=== 23 ===
- Bill Burnett, 77, South African Anglican archbishop.
- Joyce Chen, 76, Chinese-American chef, author, and television personality, Alzheimer's disease.
- Gene Filipski, 63, American gridiron football player (New York Giants).
- Zoltán Fábri, 76, Hungarian film director and screenwriter, heart attack.
- Jack Giles, 73, Australian rules footballer.
- René Møller, 48, Danish footballer.
- Carlos Rojas Pavez, 87, Chilean politician.
- Alfredo Pérez, 65, Argentine football player.
- Jim Prendergast, 77, American baseball player (Boston Braves).
- Gehendra Bahadur Rajbhandari, 70, Prime Minister of Nepal.
- Arati Saha, 53, Indian long-distance swimmer and Olympian (1952), jaundice.
- Fisher Tull, 59, American composer, arranger, and trumpeter.
- Paolo Volponi, 70, Italian writer, poet, and politician.

=== 24 ===
- Sonny Chillingworth, 62, American guitarist and singer.
- Peggy Fears, 91, American actress.
- Cecil Holmes, 73, New Zealand film director and writer.
- Birutė Nedzinskienė, 38, Lithuanian politician.
- Rickie Sorensen, 47, American child actor (The Sword in the Stone, Father of the Bride, A Lust to Kill), cancer.

=== 25 ===
- Béla Bácskai, 82, Hungarian Olympic field hockey player (1936).
- Hugh Culverhouse, 75, American businessman and attorney, lung cancer.
- Cliff Garrison, 88, American baseball player (Boston Red Sox).
- Marten Mendez, 77, American badminton player.
- Bidhyanath Pokhrel, 76, Nepali poet and politician.
- Boris Roatta, 14, French child actor, bicycle accident.

=== 26 ===
- Yehoshafat Harkabi, 72, Israeli military intelligence officer and professor.
- Ljubomir Lovrić, 74, Serbian football goalkeeper, Olympian (1948), manager.
- Richard Southam, 87, Canadian politician, member of the House of Commons of Canada (1958–1972).
- George Stewart, 92, Australian rules footballer.
- Norman Warwick, 74, British cinematographer.
- Bert Yancey, 56, American golfer, heart attack.

=== 27 ===
- Beba Bidart, 70, Argentine tango singer, actress and dancer, heart attack.
- Adam Kelso Fulton, 65, Scottish international rugby player.
- Roberto Goyeneche, 68, Argentine tango singer, pneumonia.
- Bill J. Griffith, 88, Australian rules footballer.
- Fred Griffiths, 82, English film and television actor.
- Sig Gryska, 79, American baseball player (St. Louis Browns).
- Battling Shaw, 83, Mexican boxer.
- Meredith Thompson, 33, American DEA agent, plane crash.

=== 28 ===
- Dain Clay, 75, American baseball player (Cincinnati Reds).
- Léonce Crétin, 84, French Olympic cross-country skier (1932, 1936).
- Pepita Embil, 76, Spanish Basque soprano.
- Rui Filipe, 26, Portuguese football player, traffic collision.
- Aldis Intlers, 29, Latvian-Soviet bobsledder and Olympian (1992, 1994), traffic collision.
- Vincent Leonard, 85, American prelate of the Catholic Church.
- Neil Mochan, 67, Scottish football player.
- Ernie Roberts, 82, British politician.
- Lucien Seignol, 86, French architect.
- David Wright, 74, South African-British poet, cancer.

=== 29 ===
- Jorge Berroeta, 76, Chilean Olympic swimmer (1936).
- Tushar Kanti Ghosh, 96, Indian journalist and author.
- Bruno Habārovs, 55, Soviet Latvian fencer and Olympian (1960, 1964).
- Jack Miller, 78, American politician and jurist.
- Arthur Mourant, 90, British chemist, hematologist and geneticist.
- Annibale Pelaschiar, 82, Italian Olympic sailor (1956, 1964).
- Michael Peters, 46, American choreographer and director, AIDS-related complications.
- Everett Robinson, 77, American baseball player and manager.

=== 30 ===
- Lindsay Anderson, 71, British film and theatre director, and film critic, heart attack.
- Jan Gerbich, 93, Polish Olympic boxer (1924).
- Olav Gjærevoll, 77, Norwegian botanist and politician.
- Alfonso Oiterong, 69, President of Palau.
- Filippo Zappata, 100, Italian engineer and aircraft designer.
- Hubert Zemke, 80, United States Air Force officer and flying ace during World War II.

=== 31 ===
- Barbara Avedon, 69, American television writer, political activist, and feminist.
- Mercedes Carvajal de Arocha, 91, Trinidadian-Venezuelan writer, politician and diplomat.
- Mike Garbark, 78, American baseball player (New York Yankees).
- Ram Dulari Sinha, 71, Indian freedom fighter and politician.
- John Walton, 67, Australian politician.
