= Deaths in April 1994 =

The following is a list of notable deaths in April 1994.

Entries for each day are listed alphabetically by surname. A typical entry lists information in the following sequence:

- Name, age, country of citizenship at birth, subsequent country of citizenship (if applicable), reason for notability, cause of death (if known), and reference.

== April 1994 ==
=== 1 ===
- Cliff Addison, 80, British chemist.
- John Chase, 87, American ice hockey player, Olympian (1932), and coach.
- Robert Doisneau, 81, French photographer.
- Alexander Kaletchitz, 96, American Olympic boxer (1928).
- John McMullan, 60, American gridiron football player (New York Titans).
- Thomas Head Raddall, 90, Canadian writer.
- Netty Simons, 80, American pianist, music editor, and composer.
- Gennady Voronov, 83, Soviet/Russian statesman.

=== 2 ===
- Irene Baker, 92, American politician, member of the United States House of Representatives (1964-1965).
- David Cox, 27, American marine convicted in the assault of William Alvarado, which inspired A Few Good Men (body discovered on this date)
- Betty Furness, 78, American actress, consumer advocate, and commentator.
- Raymond Z. Gallun, 83, American science fiction writer.
- Rowland Greenberg, 73, Norwegian jazz trumpeter.
- Gil Paulsen, 91, American baseball player (St. Louis Cardinals).
- Edward Vissers, 81, Belgian road bicycle racer.

=== 3 ===
- Agostinho da Silva, 88, Portuguese philosopher, essayist, and writer.
- Tom Hamilton, 88, American football player, coach, and naval aviator.
- Beverly Johnson, 46, American rock climber and adventurer, helicopter crash.
- Chad Kinch, 35, American basketball player (Cleveland Cavaliers, Dallas Mavericks), AIDS-related complications.
- Jérôme Lejeune, 67, French pediatrician and geneticist, cancer.
- Aharon Remez, 74, Israeli Air Force commander, politician and diplomat.
- William Thompson, 88, Canadian Olympic cross-country skier (1928).
- Willis A. Trafton Jr., 76, American lawyer and politician.
- Armand Vetulani, 84, Polish art historian and educator, tumor.
- Frank Wells, 62, American businessman and president of The Walt Disney Company, helicopter crash.

=== 4 ===
- Misael Acosta Solís, 83, Ecuadorian naturalist.
- Pippo Barzizza, 91, Italian composer, arranger, conductor and music director.
- Luther Cressman, 96, American archaeologist.
- André Derrien, 98, French Olympic sailor (1928).
- Kurt Meisel, 81, Austrian actor and film director.
- Gabriella Mészáros, 80, Hungarian gymnast and Olympian (1936).
- Ginny Simms, 80, American singer and film actress.
- Valentin Stănescu, 71, Romanian goalkeeper and football manager.
- Jean-Pierre Weisgerber, 89, Luxembourgish football player and Olympian (1924, 1928).

=== 5 ===
- Harold V. Almquist, 90, American college football player and athletics coach.
- Ada Carrasco, 81, Mexican actress, heart attack.
- Kurt Cobain, 27, American Hall of Fame singer (Nirvana) and songwriter ("Smells Like Teen Spirit", "Come as You Are"), suicide by gunshot.
- Lou Dials, 90, American baseball player.
- Eduardo Jiménez de Aréchaga, 75, Uruguayan jurist, traffic collision.
- Bobby Hofman, 68, American baseball player (New York Giants), and coach, cancer.
- Otari Kvantrishvili, 46, Georgian mafia boss, homicide.
- Charles Newton, 77, American gridiron football player (Philadelphia Eagles).
- Arthur Vere Harvey, Baron Harvey of Prestbury, 88, British Royal Air Force officer and a politician.
- Marlon Riggs, 37, American filmmaker, poet, and gay rights activist, AIDS-related complications.
- Ghulam Fareed Sabri, 64, Pakistani qawwali singer.
- Roy Smeck, 94, American musician.
- André Tchelistcheff, 92, American winemaker.

=== 6 ===
- Margit Albrechtsson, 76, Swedish Olympic cross-country skier (1952).
- Hub Barker, 75, American football player (New York Giants).
- Klaus Bodinger, 61, German swimmer.
- Omar Carrasco, 20, Argentine conscript, blunt trauma. (body discovered on this date)
- Dick Cary, 77, American jazz trumpeter, composer and arranger.
- Shekhar Chatterjee, 70, Indian actor and film director.
- Bernard Ciza, Burundian politician, Minister of Public Works (since 1994), assassinated.
- Sheck Exley, 45, American cave diver, diving accident.
- Bill Ford, 78, American baseball player (Boston Bees).
- Juvénal Habyarimana, 57, Rwandan politician and military officer, president of Rwanda (since 1973), assassinated.
- Catherine Lombard, 28, French freestyle skier, AIDS-related complications.
- Patricia Ann McGee, 67, Native American tribal leader.
- Kahnu Charan Mohanty, 87, Indian novelist.
- Déogratias Nsabimana, 48, Rwandan military officer, chief of staff of the Rwandan Armed Forces (since 1992), assassinated.
- Cyprien Ntaryamira, 39, Burundian politician, president of Burundi (since 1994), assassinated.
- Cuthbert Peacocke, 90, Irish Anglican bishop.
- Goody Rosen, 81, Canadian baseball player (Brooklyn Dodgers, New York Giants).
- Cyriaque Simbizi, Burundian politician, Minister of Communication, assassinated.
- Paola Tovaglia, 28, Italian children's television presenter, brain cancer.

=== 7 ===
- Harry Adaskin, 92, Canadian violinist, academic, and radio broadcaster.
- Robert P. Baldwin, 76, American USAF pilot.
- Lee Brilleaux, 41, English R&B singer and musician, lymphoma.
- Ken Carson, 79, American singer, songwriter, and musician.
- Bill Dickinson, 77, Scottish rugby player and coach.
- Ștefan Dobay, 84, Romanian football player.
- Antônio Jacobina Filho, 87, Brazilian Olympic water polo player (1932).
- François de Grossouvre, 76, French politician, suicide by gunshot.
- Cecil Gould, 75, British art historian and curator, brain cancer.
- Albert Guðmundsson, 70, Icelandic football player and politician.
- Ramesh Chandra Jha, 65, Indian poet, novelist and freedom fighter.
- Archibald Kennedy, 7th Marquess of Ailsa, 68, Scottish peer.
- Cesar Legaspi, 77, Filipino painter, prostate cancer.
- Golo Mann, 85, German historian and essayist.
- Ruben Rustia, 70, Filipino actor.
- Sigmund Ruud, 86, Norwegian ski jumper and Olympian (1928, 1932, 1936).
- Charles W. Shea, 72, American soldier, Medal of Honor recipient.
- Auguste Sirot, 74, French Olympic gymnast (1948).
- Agathe Uwilingiyimana, 40, Prime Minister of Rwanda, murdered.

=== 8 ===
- Irene Eisinger, 90, German-British opera singer and film actress.
- Josef Neumann, 83, Swiss athlete and Olympian (1936).
- François Rozet, 95, French-Canadian actor.
- Jean-Marie Rudasingwa, 33, Rwandan Olympic middle-distance runner (1984).
- Roman Seljak, 59, Yugoslavian Olympic cross-country skier (1964).
- Leonard Small, 88, Scottish minister and author.
- Paul Söllner, 82, German Olympic rower (1936).
- Dada Vujasinović, 30, Serbian journalist and reporter.
- Åke Wallenquist, 90, Swedish astronomer.

=== 9 ===
- Gaston Bauer, 58, Luxembourgian footballer.
- Lewis Billups, 30, American gridiron football player (Cincinnati Bengals, Green Bay Packers), car crash.
- M. S. Fernando, 58, Sri Lankan singer and musician.
- Marcel Ichac, 87, French alpinist, explorer, photographer and film director.
- Mieczysław Maneli, 72, Polish lawyer, diplomat and academic.
- Theodore D. Mann, 71, American politician.
- Douglas McKay, 89, Australian cricketer.
- Hal Missingham, 87, Australian artist and watercolourist.
- Keith Park, 73, Australian rules footballer.
- Anthony E. Pratt, 90, English musician and inventor of board game Cluedo, Alzheimer's disease.
- Paul Păun, 78, Romanian-Israeli avant-garde poet and visual artist.
- Keith Watson, 59, British comics artist, cancer.

=== 10 ===
- Terry Adlington, 58, English footballer.
- Viktor Afanasyev, 71, Soviet/Russian journalist and professor of philosophy.
- Reinaldo Gorno, 75, Argentine long-distance runner and Olympian (1952).
- Sam B. Hall, 70, American lawyer, politician, and judge.
- John O'Brien, 33, American author (Leaving Las Vegas), suicide.
- V. G. W. Ratnayake, 85, Sri Lankan politician.

=== 11 ===
- Wesley Barry, 86, American actor, director, and producer.
- John Block, 64, Dutch aviation pioneer.
- Sticks Evans, 71, American drummer, percussionist, arranger and musical director.
- Matthew Feldman, 75, American politician.
- Johnny Posewitz, 87, American basketball player.
- Chu Tunan, 95, Chinese politician.
- Bill Wondolowski, 47, American football player (San Francisco 49ers).

=== 12 ===
- Elissa Aalto, 71, Finnish architect.
- Bob Cryer, 59, English politician, traffic collision.
- Daniel Levinson, 73, American psychologist.
- Branko Mikulić, 65, Yugoslavian statesman, lung cancer.
- Pamela Mitford, 86, English socialite and one of the Mitford sisters.
- Joseph Nelis, 77, Belgian football player.
- Frank V. Phillips, 82, American cinematographer (The Black Hole, Pete's Dragon, The Apple Dumpling Gang).

=== 13 ===
- Kurt Aland, 79, German theologian and biblical scholar.
- Jørgen Buckhøj, 59, Danish actor
- Fred Dawley, 73, American football player (Detroit Lions).
- Bob Dummett, 58, Australian rules footballer.
- Birnie Duthie, 88, British Olympic alpine skier (1936).
- Piet Engels, 70, Dutch politician.
- Robert K. A. Gardiner, 79, Ghanaian government official, university professor, and economist.
- Claude Heymann, 86, French screenwriter and film director.
- Rudolf Hrušínský, 73, Czech actor and director.
- Giuseppe Kressevich, 78, Italian Olympic racewalker (1952).
- Nikolai Kryuchkov, 83, Soviet/Russian film actor.
- John Marriott, 81, Australian politician.
- Bert Ramelson, 84, British communist politician.
- Mika Tiivola, 71, Finnish businessman.

=== 14 ===
- Bobby Gurney, 86, English football player and manager.
- Evelyn King, 86, British politician.
- Salimuzzaman Siddiqui, 96, Pakistani organic chemist, painter, and poet.
- Hugh Springer, 80, Barbados politician and fourth Governor-general of Barbados.

=== 15 ===
- István Boros, 84, Male Hungarian international table tennis player.
- Walter Clegg, 73, British Conservative politician.
- John Curry, 44, British figure skater and Olympian (1972, 1976), heart attack.
- Vardges Petrosyan, 61, Armenian writer of fiction and drama, homicide.
- Milan Skřont, 63, Czech Olympic racewalker (1956).

=== 16 ===
- Anna-Kaarina Aalto, 73, Finnish physician and politician, MP.
- József Albert, 81, Hungarian football player.
- Chris Carroll, 70, Australian rules footballer.
- Renu Chakravartty, 76, Indian politician and leader of Communist Party of India.
- Ralph Ellison, 80, American novelist, literary critic, and scholar, pancreatic cancer.
- Leslie Flint, 83, British psychic medium.
- John McLiam, 76, Canadian actor (Cool Hand Luke, In Cold Blood, First Blood), Parkinson's disease.
- Reginald Parkin, 84, English cricketer.
- Victor Popov, 56, Russian theoretical physicist.
- José Ramón Sauto, 81, Mexican football player.
- Samuel Selvon, 70, Trinidad and Tobago writer, respiratory failure.
- Allan "Whitey" Snyder, 79, American make-up artist.
- Ron Vawter, 45, American actor (The Silence of the Lambs, Philadelphia, Sex, Lies, and Videotape), heart attack.

=== 17 ===
- Don Jefferson, 98, American baseball player.
- Robert Legget, 89, Canadian civil engineer, historian and writer.
- Karl Lillge, 76, American basketball player.
- Arthur Muhl, 81, Australian cricketer.
- André Oriol, 91, French Olympic rower (1924).
- Roger Sperry, 80, American neuropsychologist, neurobiologist and Nobel Prize laureate.
- Walter Wilson, 80, American baseball player (Detroit Tigers).
- Manno Wolf-Ferrari, 82, Italian conductor.

=== 18 ===
- Tamás Aczél, 72, Hungarian poet, writer, and journalist.
- Dener, 23, Brazilian football player and manager, traffic collision.
- George Hesik, 80, American basketball player.
- Ken Oosterbroek, 32, South African photojournalist, shot.
- Ruggero Orlando, 86, Italian journalist, writer and politician.
- Robert O. Peterson, 78, American businessman and philanthropist.
- Bill Rexford, 67, American racecar driver.
- Anni Stolte, 79, German Olympic swimmer (1936).

=== 19 ===
- Taisia Afonina, 80, Soviet/Russian painter and watercolorist.
- Virginia Bell, 66, American baseball player.
- Michael Carreras, 66, British film producer and director.
- Larry Davis, 57, American blues musician, cancer.
- Rodolfo de Álzaga, 63, Argentine racing driver.
- Josip Kujundžić, 79, Yugoslavian Olympic gymnast (1948).
- Tommy McCue, 80, English rugby player.
- Edward Raymond Neaher, 81, American district judge (United States District Court for the Eastern District of New York).
- Rolf Paetz, 71, German football player.

=== 20 ===
- Anna Molka Ahmed, 76, Pakistani artist.
- Jean Carmet, 73, French actor, heart attack.
- Miguel Diab, 73, Uruguayan Olympic basketball player (1948).
- Frederick Feary, 82, American Olympic boxer (1932).
- Frederick Fortune, 73, American bobsledder and Olympian (1948, 1952).
- Rosalie Gicanda, 66, Rwandan queen, murdered.
- Jean Ousset, 79, French catholic ideologist, stroke.
- Qəmər Salamzadə, 85, Azerbaijani and Soviet film director and screenwriter.
- Dennis Cleveland Stewart, 46, American actor (Grease) and dancer, AIDS-related disease.

=== 21 ===
- Robert Bonnett, 77, Australian politician.
- Clyde Crabtree, 88, American gridiron football player.
- Howard Barraclough Fell, 76, New Zealand zoologist.
- Ruth Hiatt, 88, American actress.
- Edmond Keosayan, 57, Armenian and Soviet film director and musician, laryngeal cancer.
- Rolf Schønheyder, 80, Norwegian Olympic sprinter (1936).
- Raúl Soldi, 89, Argentine painter and production designer.

=== 22 ===
- Charles Reginald Dodwell, 72, British art historian.
- Oretta Fiume, 74, Italian film actress.
- Karl Hess, 70, American speechwriter and author.
- Jan Klingers, 64, Dutch Olympic canoeist (1952).
- Richard Nixon, 81, 37th President of the United States, stroke.
- Don Simensen, 67, American football player (Los Angeles Rams).
- Emil Uremovich, 77, American football player (Detroit Lions, Chicago Rockets).

=== 23 ===
- Lucho Bermúdez, 82, Colombian musician, DJ, and performer, heart attack.
- Cécile Dreesmann, 74, Dutch textile artist.
- Zhu Futang, 94, Chinese pediatrician.
- Jimmy Izquierdo, 32, Ecuadorian football player, traffic collision.
- Petra Lupačová, 26, Czech Olympic handball player (1988).
- Flavio Mogherini, 72, Italian production designer, art director and film director.

=== 24 ===
- Donald J. Atwood Jr., 69, American engineer and Deputy Secretary of Defense.
- Edwin Adams Davis, 90, American historian.
- Lawren P. Harris, 83, Canadian visual artist and art educator.
- S. L. Kirloskar, 90, Indian businessman.
- Gus Leishman, 82, Australian rules footballer.
- Margot Trooger, 70, German film actress.

=== 25 ===
- Swede Ellstrom, 87, American football player.
- Georgios Gennimatas, 54, Greek politician, lung cancer.
- Gordon Jones, 64, American Major League Baseball player.
- Mike Kreevich, 85, American baseball player.
- David Langton, 82, British actor.
- Giovanni Pettinati, 68, Italian racing cyclist.
- Roberto Scarone, 76, Uruguayan football player and manager, Alzheimer's disease.

=== 26 ===
- Andrey Ayzderdzis, 35, Russian politician, homicide.
- Rostam Bastuni, 71, Israeli politician and journalist.
- Arne Larsson, 59, Swedish footballer.
- Mas Oyama, 70, Korean-Japanese karate master, lung cancer.
- Bill Pellington, 66, American gridiron football player (Baltimore Colts).
- Bob Pike, 60, Australian politician.
- Manuel Enríquez Salazar, 67, Mexican composer, violinist and pedagogue.
- Zein al-Sharaf bint Jamil, 77, Queen of Jordan as the wife of King Talal.
- Maximilian von Edelsheim, 96, German nazi Wehrmacht general during World War II.

=== 27 ===
- Lynne Frederick, 39, English actress (Nicholas and Alexandra, Henry VIII and His Six Wives, The Amazing Mr. Blunden), seizure.
- Vasilis Goulandris, 80, Greek shipowner and art collector.
- Jim Snyder, 74, American college basketball player and coach (Ohio Bobcats).
- Timothy Wilson Spencer, 32, American serial killer, execution by electrocution.

=== 28 ===
- Oleg Borisov, 64, Soviet and Russian actor, leukemia.
- Darryl Carlton, 40, American football player (Miami Dolphins, Tampa Bay Buccaneers).
- Robert Spencer Carr, 85, American writer of science fiction and fantasy.
- Avner Hizkiyahu, 67, Israeli actor (Impossible on Saturday, The Thin Line) and singer.
- Gerhard Lindemann, 97, German nazi Wehrmacht general during World War II.
- John Preston, 48, American author of gay erotica, AIDS-related complications.
- Berton Roueché, 84, American medical writer, suicide.

=== 29 ===
- Marcel Bernard, 79, French tennis player.
- Jimmy Darden, 71, American basketball player and coach.
- Juan Guilbe, 79, Puerto Rican baseball player.
- Ignacio Farrés Iquino, 83, Spanish film director, screenwriter, and producer.
- Russell Kirk, 75, American political theorist and writer.
- John Mangum, 51, American football player (Boston Patriots).
- Bill Quinn, 81, American actor (Archie Bunker's Place, The Birds, Star Trek V: The Final Frontier).
- Sak Sutsakhan, 66, Cambodian soldier and anti-communist politician.

=== 30 ===
- Herbert Bowden, Baron Aylestone, 89, British politician.
- Chris A. Butler, 41, American set decorator (Chaplin, Postcards from the Edge, L.A. Story), complications from AIDS.
- George Constantin, 60, Romanian actor.
- Sorie Ibrahim Koroma, 64, Sierra Leonean politician and labor activist.
- Ina Lamason, 82, New Zealand cricketer.
- Roland Ratzenberger, 33, Austrian racing driver, racing accident.
- Ferdinando Scarfiotti, 53, Italian art director and production designer.
- Richard Scarry, 74, American children's author and illustrator, heart attack.
