= 1994 in film =

The year 1994 in film involved many major film events. The top worldwide grosser was The Lion King, becoming the highest-grossing animated film of all-time, although it was slightly overtaken at the North American domestic box office by Forrest Gump, which won the Academy Award for Best Picture. The year is considered to be one of Hollywood's best years for cinema during the post-Golden Age era, setting the standard for the movies of the modern age.

Also in 1994, Metro-Goldwyn-Mayer celebrated its 70th anniversary.

== Highest-grossing films ==
The top 10 films released in 1994 by worldwide gross are as follows:

Highest-grossing films of 1994
Rank	Title	Distributor	Worldwide gross
1	The Lion King	Buena Vista	$763,455,561
2	Forrest Gump	Paramount	$677,945,399
3	True Lies	20th Century Fox / Universal	$378,882,411
4	The Mask	New Line	$351,583,407
5	Speed	20th Century Fox	$350,448,145
6	The Flintstones	Universal	$341,631,208
7	Dumb and Dumber	New Line	$247,275,374
8	Four Weddings and a Funeral	Gramercy	$245,700,832
9	Interview with the Vampire	Warner Bros.	$223,664,608
10	Clear and Present Danger	Paramount	$215,887,717

== Events ==
- February 15 – Viacom acquired 50.1% of Paramount Communications Inc. for $9.75 billion, following a five-month battle with QVC.
- March 4 – Actor John Candy (1950–1994) dies of a heart attack at the age of 43 while on location in Durango, Mexico for the film Wagons East.
- March 21 – Steven Spielberg wins his first Academy Award for Best Director for Schindler's List.
- April 14 – Gone with the Wind (1939) becomes the first motion picture ever to be broadcast on the cable channel Turner Classic Movies.
- June 7 – Pierce Brosnan is officially announced as the fifth actor to play James Bond.
- June 10 – Speed is released, becoming one of the top-grossing films of the year, as well as launching Keanu Reeves into superstardom and making Sandra Bullock a worldwide star.
- June 24 – The Lion King is theatrically released. It goes on to become Buena Vista's highest-grossing film and the highest-grossing animated film, as well as the second highest-grossing film of all time at the time of its release, just behind Jurassic Park.
- July 1 – Val Kilmer (1959–2025) is officially announced as the next actor to portray Batman following the abrupt departure of Michael Keaton.
- July 6 – Forrest Gump is released and becomes Paramount Pictures' highest-grossing film of all-time, up until it was surpassed by Titanic in 1998.
- July 15 – 20th Century Fox unveils a new on-screen logo and fanfare composed by Bruce Broughton, which debuts True Lies.
- October 12 – DreamWorks is founded by Steven Spielberg, Jeffrey Katzenberg and David Geffen.
- December 29 – Buena Vista Pictures Distribution becomes the first distributor to have grosses in the United States and Canada in a year exceed $1 billion.

== Awards ==
Category/Organization	52nd Golden Globe Awards January 21, 1995		Producers, Directors, Screen Actors, and Writers Guild Awards	67th Academy Awards March 27, 1995	48th BAFTA Awards April 22, 1995
Category/Organization	Drama	Musical or Comedy	Producers, Directors, Screen Actors, and Writers Guild Awards	67th Academy Awards March 27, 1995	48th BAFTA Awards April 22, 1995
Best Film	Forrest Gump	The Lion King	Forrest Gump		Four Weddings and a Funeral
Best Director	Robert Zemeckis; Forrest Gump				Mike Newell; Four Weddings and a Funeral
Best Actor	Tom Hanks; Forrest Gump	Hugh Grant; Four Weddings and a Funeral	Tom Hanks; Forrest Gump		Hugh Grant; Four Weddings and a Funeral
Best Actress	Jessica Lange; Blue Sky	Jamie Lee Curtis; True Lies	Jodie Foster; Nell	Jessica Lange; Blue Sky	Susan Sarandon; The Client
Best Supporting Actor	Martin Landau; Ed Wood				Samuel L. Jackson; Pulp Fiction
Best Supporting Actress	Dianne Wiest; Bullets over Broadway				Kristin Scott Thomas; Four Weddings and a Funeral
Best Screenplay, Adapted	Quentin Tarantino; Pulp Fiction		Eric Roth; Forrest Gump		Paul Attanasio; Quiz Show
Best Screenplay, Original	Quentin Tarantino; Pulp Fiction		Richard Curtis; Four Weddings and a Funeral	Quentin Tarantino and Roger Avary; Pulp Fiction	
Best Original Score	The Lion King; Hans Zimmer		N/A	The Lion King; Hans Zimmer	Backbeat; Don Was
Best Original Song	"Can You Feel the Love Tonight"; The Lion King		N/A	"Can You Feel the Love Tonight"; The Lion King	N/A
Best Foreign Language Film	Farinelli		N/A	Burnt by the Sun	To Live

Palme d'Or (Cannes Film Festival):

Pulp Fiction, directed by Quentin Tarantino, United States

Golden Lion (Venice Film Festival):

Before the Rain (Pred doždot), directed by Milčo Mančevski, Macedonia
Vive L'Amour, directed by Tsai Ming-liang, Taiwan

Golden Bear (Berlin Film Festival):

In the Name of the Father, directed by Jim Sheridan, United Kingdom / Ireland

People's Choice Award (Toronto International Film Festival):

Priest, directed by Antonia Bird, United Kingdom

== 1994 films ==
=== By country/region ===
- List of American films of 1994
- List of Argentine films of 1994
- List of Australian films of 1994
- List of Bangladeshi films of 1994
- List of British films of 1994
- List of Canadian films of 1994
- List of French films of 1994
- List of Hong Kong films of 1994
- List of Indian films of 1994
  - List of Hindi films of 1994
  - List of Kannada films of 1994
  - List of Malayalam films of 1994
  - List of Marathi films of 1994
  - List of Tamil films of 1994
  - List of Telugu films of 1994
- List of Japanese films of 1994
- List of Mexican films of 1994
- List of Pakistani films of 1994
- List of Russian films of 1994
- List of South Korean films of 1994
- List of Spanish films of 1994

=== By genre/medium ===
- List of action films of 1994
- List of animated feature films of 1994
- List of avant-garde films of 1994
- List of crime films of 1994
- List of comedy films of 1994
- List of drama films of 1994
- List of horror films of 1994
- List of science fiction films of 1994
- List of thriller films of 1994
- List of western films of 1994

== Births ==
- January 1 – Jack Rovello, American actor
- January 4 – Masey McLain, American actress
- January 17 – Lucy Boynton, English actress
- January 18
  - Sam Strike, English actor
  - Hunter Doohan, American actor
- January 19
  - Josh Dylan, British actor
  - Kristi Lauren, American actress
- January 21 – Booboo Stewart, American actor and singer
- January 26 – Joseph Quinn, English actor
- January 28 – Maluma, Colombian singer-songwriter and actor
- January 29 – Selina Lo, British actress
- January 30 – Tom Hudson, French actor
- February 1
  - Julia Garner, American actress
  - Harry Styles, English singer and actor
- February 3 - Aimee Lou Wood, English actress and writer
- February 5 – Andrea Deck, American actress
- February 6
  - Charlie Heaton, English actor
  - Moses Ingram, American actress
- February 10 - Makenzie Vega, American actress
- February 11
  - Eva Victor, French-American actor, writer, and director
  - Dylan Arnold, American actor
- February 14
  - Allie Grant, American actress
  - Paul Butcher, American actor
- February 15 – Corinne Foxx, American model, actress and producer
- February 16 – Matthew Knight, Canadian actor
- February 21 –
  - Hayley Orrantia, actress
  - Wendy, South Korean singer, voice actress and radio host
- February 22 - Ellen Marlow, American actress
- February 23
  - Little Simz, British rapper, singer and actress
  - Dakota Fanning, American actress
  - James Paxton, American actor
- February 28 - Kris Castle, American actress and content creator
- March 1 – Justin Bieber, Canadian singer
- March 3 – Lee David, South Korean actor
- March 12
  - Christina Grimmie, American singer-songwriter, musician, actress and YouTuber (d. 2016)
  - Tyler Patrick Jones, American actor
- March 14 – Ansel Elgort, American actor and singer
- March 15 – Märten Metsaviir, Estonian actor
- March 16 – Sierra McClain, American actress and singer
- March 21 – Jasmin Savoy Brown, American actress
- March 26 – Freya Tingley, Australian actress
- April 1 – Ella Eyre, English singer-songwriter
- April 6 – Fabien Frankel, British actor
- April 11 – Dakota Blue Richards, English actress
- April 12 – Saoirse Ronan, Irish actress
- April 14 – Skyler Samuels, American actress
- April 16 – Liliana Mumy, American actress
- April 18 – Moisés Arias, American actor
- April 24 – Jordan Fisher, American actor, singer and musician
- May 2 – Sara Forsberg, Finnish singer-songwriter, YouTube personality, television presenter and actress
- May 4 – Alexander Gould, American actor
- May 7 - Dylan Gelula, American actress
- May 11 – David Alvarez, Canadian dancer and actor
- May 24
  - Cayden Boyd, American actor
  - Lily Newmark, English actress
- May 29 – Paloma Kwiatkowski, Canadian actress
- June 2 – Jemma McKenzie-Brown, English actress and singer
- June 4 – Mandela Van Peebles, American actor and producer
- June 7 – Andi Matichak, American actress
- June 8 – Anthony Boyle, Irish actor
- June 11 – Ivana Baquero, Spanish actress
- June 23 – Connor Jessup, Canadian actor, writer and director
- June 24 – Erin Moriarty, American actress
- June 26 – Leonard Carow, German actor
- June 29 – Camila Mendes, American actress
- June 30 – Josh Rojas, American Baseball Player
- July 6 – Camilla and Rebecca Rosso, English twin actresses
- July 16 – Mark Indelicato, American actor
- July 17 – Anna Grace Barlow, American actress
- July 18
  - Lamar Johnson, Canadian actor
  - Taylor Russell, Canadian actress and filmmaker
  - Lee Yoo-mi, South Korean actress
- July 22 – Jaz Sinclair, American film actress
- July 23 – Kelvin Harrison Jr., American actor
- July 24
  - Bronwyn James, English actress
  - Jaboukie Young-White, American stand-up comedian, actor and writer
- August 2 – Angus Imrie, English actor
- August 10 – Jack Haven, American actor
- August 17 – Taissa Farmiga, American actress
- August 18 – Madelaine Petsch, American actress and YouTuber
- August 21 – Jacqueline Emerson, American actress and singer
- August 22 – Israel Broussard, American actor
- August 23 – Francesca Reale, American actress
- August 25
  - Josh Flitter, American actor
  - Natasha Liu Bordizzo, Australian actress and model
- August 27 – Ellar Coltrane, American actor
- August 29 – Eduardo Franco, American actor and comedian
- September 3 – María Mercedes Coroy, Guatemalan actress of Kaqchikel Maya descent
- September 4 – Tilda Cobham-Hervey, Australian actress
- September 7 – Kento Yamazaki, Japanese actor
- September 11 – Jordi El Niño Polla, Spanish adult film actor
- September 17 – Denyse Tontz, American actress and singer-songwriter
- September 19 – Alex Etel, English former actor
- September 20
  - Wallis Day, British actress
  - Mathilde Ollivier, French actress and model
- September 21 – Khin Wint Wah, Burmese actress
- September 23 – Aurora Perrineau, American actress and model
- September 25 – Jansen Panettiere, American actor (d. 2023)
- September 27 - Eman Esfandi, American actor
- September 29
  - Halsey, American singer and actress
  - Clara Mamet, American actress and musician
  - Nicholas Galitzine, British actor
- September 30 – Raphaël Coleman, English actor (d. 2020)
- October 2 – Brendan Meyer, Canadian actor
- October 9 – Jodelle Ferland, Canadian actress
- October 10
  - Kyle Allen, American actor
  - Bae Suzy, South Korean actress and singer
- October 23 – Margaret Qualley, American actress
- October 26 – Allie DeBerry, American actress
- October 27 – Eddie Alderson, American actor
- November 10 – Zoey Deutch, American actress
- November 11 – Connor Price, Canadian-American actor
- November 15 – Emma Dumont, American actress and model
- November 17 – Raquel Castro, American actress
- November 22 – Dacre Montgomery, Australian actor
- November 24 – Holly Mae Brood, Dutch actress
- November 26 – Anjelica Bette Fellini, American actress
- November 29 – Sarah Roach, American voice actress
- December 3 – Jake T. Austin, American actor
- December 6 - Molly Gordon, American actress, screenwriter and director
- December 10 – Kayli Mills, American voice actress
- December 11 – Gabriel Basso, American actor
- December 15 – Emma Lockhart, American journalist & former actress
- December 17 – Nat Wolff, American actor and singer
- December 26 – Samantha Boscarino, American actress
- December 31 - Max Bowden, British actor

== Deaths ==
Month	Date	Name	Age	Country	Profession	Notable films
January	1	Cesar Romero	86	US	Actor	Batman; Ocean's 11
January	3	Heather Sears	58	UK	Actress	The Story of Esther Costello; The Phantom of the Opera
January	7	Vittorio Mezzogiorno	52	Italy	Actor	Three Brothers; Scream of Stone
January	7	Llewellyn Rees	92	UK	Actor	A Fish Called Wanda; Withnail and I
January	8	Pat Buttram	78	US	Actor	Who Framed Roger Rabbit; Robin Hood
January	9	Madge Ryan	75	Australia	Actress	A Clockwork Orange; Frenzy
January	12	Samuel Bronston	85	Moldova	Producer	El Cid; King of Kings
January	14	Esther Ralston	91	US	Actress	To the Last Man; Tin Pan Alley
January	19	Kenneth Utt	72	US	Producer, Production Manager	The Silence of the Lambs; Philadelphia
January	22	Jean-Louis Barrault	83	France	Actor	Children of Paradise; The Longest Day
January	22	Frances Gifford	73	US	Actress	The Reluctant Dragon; She Went to the Races
January	22	Telly Savalas	72	US	Actor	On Her Majesty's Secret Service; Cape Fear
January	23	Oliver Smith	75	US	Production Designer	Guys and Dolls; Oklahoma!
January	27	Claude Akins	67	US	Actor	Rio Bravo; Battle for the Planet of the Apes
January	28	Hal Smith	77	US	Actor, Voice Actor	Beauty and the Beast; An American Tail
February	1	Olan Soule	84	US	Actor	The Towering Inferno; The Shaggy D.A.
February	6	Harold Schneider	55	US	Producer	Days of Heaven; WarGames
February	6	Joseph Cotten	88	US	Actor	Citizen Kane; The Third Man
February	6	Gwen Watford	66	UK	Actress	The Fall of the House of Usher; Cleopatra
February	9	Jarmila Novotna	86	Czech Republic	Singer, Actress	The Great Caruso; The Search
February	11	Sorrell Booke	64	US	Actor	What's Up, Doc?; Fail Safe
February	11	William Conrad	73	US	Actor, Producer	The Killers; The Naked Jungle
February	15	Tiger Haynes	86	US	Actor	Awakenings; Moscow on the Hudson
February	19	Derek Jarman	52	UK	Director, Screenwriter	Edward II; Blue
February	24	Dinah Shore	76	US	Singer, Actress	Up in Arms; Till the Clouds Roll By
February	28	Enrico Maria Salerno	67	Italy	Actor	Casanova 70; The Bird with the Crystal Plumage
March	2	Anita Morris	50	US	Actress	Ruthless People; The Hotel New Hampshire
March	4	John Candy	43	Canada	Actor	Planes, Trains and Automobiles; Uncle Buck
March	6	Melina Mercouri	73	Greece	Actress	Never on Sunday; Topkapi
March	8	John Ewart	66	Australia	Actor	Hurricane Smith; Frog Dreaming
March	9	Fernando Rey	76	Spain	Actor	The French Connection; That Obscure Object of Desire
March	17	Mai Zetterling	68	Sweden	Actress	The Witches; Hidden Agenda
March	21	Macdonald Carey	81	US	Actor	Shadow of a Doubt; The Great Gatsby
March	21	Lili Damita	89	France	Actress	This Is the Night; Brewster's Millions
March	21	Dack Rambo	52	US	Actor	Which Way to the Front?; Ultra Warrior
March	22	Walter Lantz	94	US	Animator	Woody Woodpecker; Andy Panda
March	23	Giulietta Masina	73	Italy	Actress	La Strada; Juliet of the Spirits
March	23	Paula Trueman	93	US	Actress	The Outlaw Josey Wales; Dirty Dancing
March	29	Bill Travers	72	UK	Actor	Geordie; Born Free
April	2	Betty Furness	78	US	Actress	Magnificent Obsession; Swing Time
April	3	Frank Wells	62	US	Studio Executive	
April	4	Ginny Simms	80	US	Singer, Actress	Broadway Rhythm; Hit the Ice
April	12	Frank V. Phillips	82	US	Cinematographer	The Black Hole; Escape to Witch Mountain
April	16	John McLiam	76	Canada	Actor	Cool Hand Luke; The Missouri Breaks
April	16	Ron Vawter	45	US	Actor	Philadelphia; The Silence of the Lambs
April	20	Dennis Cleveland Stewart	46	US	Actor	Grease; Sgt. Pepper's Lonely Hearts Club Band
April	27	Lynne Frederick	39	UK	Actress	Voyage of the Damned; Phase IV
April	30	Chris Butler	41	US	Set Decorator	Chaplin; Bill & Ted's Bogus Journey
April	30	Ferdinando Scarfiotti	53	Italy	Production Designer	The Last Emperor; Scarface
May	6	Fred Sadoff	67	US	Actor	The Poseidon Adventure; Papillon
May	7	Ray Elton	80	UK	Cinematographer	Last Holiday; The Blind Goddess
May	8	George Peppard	65	US	Actor	Breakfast at Tiffany's; How the West Was Won
May	8	Murray Spivack	90	US	Sound Engineer	King Kong; Hello, Dolly!
May	11	Timothy Carey	65	US	Actor	Paths of Glory; One-Eyed Jacks
May	15	Royal Dano	71	US	Actor	The Outlaw Josey Wales; Man of the West
May	15	Gilbert Roland	88	Mexico	Actor	The Bad and the Beautiful; Thunder Bay
May	16	Alain Cuny	85	France	Actor	Les Visiteurs du soir; Les Amants
May	19	Henry Morgan	79	US	Actor	So This Is New York; Murder, Inc.
May	24	Oscar Saul	81	US	Screenwriter	A Streetcar Named Desire; Major Dundee
May	29	Joseph Janni	78	Italy	Producer	Darling; Modesty Blaise
May	31	Sidney Gilliat	86	UK	Director, Screenwriter	The Rake's Progress; The Lady Vanishes
June	2	Philip Dunne	84	US	Screenwriter, Director	Wild in the Country; Ten North Frederick
June	4	Stephen McNally	80	US	Actor	Johnny Belinda; Winchester '73
June	4	Massimo Troisi	41	Italy	Actor, Director, Screenwriter	The Postman; Nothing Left to Do But Cry
June	6	Johnny Downs	80	US	Actor	Pigskin Parade; What a Man!
June	6	Barry Sullivan	81	US	Actor	The Bad and the Beautiful; Jeopardy
June	7	Dennis Potter	59	UK	Screenwriter	Gorky Park; Pennies from Heaven
June	11	Herbert Anderson	77	US	Actor	The Benny Goodman Story; Hold On
June	12	Chris Latta	44	US	Actor	The Transformers: The Movie; Stop! Or My Mom Will Shoot
June	13	Nadia Gray	70	Romania	Actress	The Captain's Table; Night Without Stars
June	13	K. T. Stevens	74	US	Actress	Harriet Craig; Address Unknown
June	14	Henry Mancini	70	US	Composer	The Pink Panther; Breakfast at Tiffany's
June	16	Eileen Way	82	UK	Actress	The Vikings; Queen of Hearts
June	20	Robin Raymond	77	US	Actress	The Glass Wall; The Candidate
June	21	Winston Miller	83	US	Screenwriter	Lucy Gallant; April Love
June	22	Jack Davies	80	UK	Screenwriter	Those Magnificent Men in Their Flying Machines; Gambit
July	1	Dominic Lucero	26	US	Dancer, Actor	Newsies; Stand and Deliver
July	6	Cameron Mitchell	75	US	Actor	Carousel; My Favorite Year
July	8	Robert B. Hauser	75	US	Cinematographer	The Odd Couple; Le Mans
July	8	Dick Sargent	64	US	Actor	Operation Petticoat; That Touch of Mink
July	14	Eric Linden	84	US	Actor	Gone with the Wind; A Family Affair
July	14	Alberto Lionello	64	Italy	Actor	The Birds, the Bees and the Italians; Pigsty
July	15	Mona Rico	87	Mexico	Actress	Eternal Love; Shanghai Lady
July	19	Gottfried Reinhardt	83	Germany	Director	Betrayed; Town Without Pity
July	20	Gregg Fonseca	41	US	Production Designer	A Nightmare on Elm Street; Wayne's World
July	23	Mario Brega	71	Italy	Actor	The Good, the Bad and the Ugly; Talcum Powder
July	23	Hans J. Salter	98	Austria	Composer	Creature from the Black Lagoon; The Wolf Man
July	30	Janis Carter	80	US	Actress	I Love Trouble; Flying Leathernecks
August	2	Bert Freed	74	US	Actor	Detective Story; Paths of Glory
August	3	John Zenda	50	US	Actor	Halloween II; Bad Boys
August	7	Robert Hutton	74	US	Actor	They Came from Beyond Space; Cinderfella
August	11	Peter Cushing	81	UK	Actor	Star Wars; The Curse of Frankenstein
August	11	Red Mitchell	33	US	Actor	8 Seconds; JFK
August	14	Joan Harrison	87	UK	Screenwriter, Producer	Rebecca; Foreign Correspondent
August	16	John Doucette	73	US	Actor	Patton; True Grit
August	21	Danitra Vance	40	US	Actress	Sticky Fingers; Jumpin' at the Boneyard
August	26	Norman Warwick	74	UK	Cinematographer	The Abominable Dr. Phibes; Tales from the Crypt
August	26	Tariq Yunus	47-54	India	Actor	Who Dares Wins; The Fourth Protocol
August	30	Lindsay Anderson	71	UK	Director	This Sporting Life; If....
September	6	James Clavell	72	Australia	Screenwriter, Director	To Sir, with Love; The Great Escape
September	6	Duccio Tessari	67	Italian	Director, Screenwriter	A Pistol for Ringo; Kiss Kiss...Bang Bang
September	7	Dennis Morgan	85	US	Actor	Christmas in Connecticut; God Is My Co-Pilot
September	7	Godfrey Quigley	71	Israel	Actor	A Clockwork Orange; Barry Lyndon
September	7	Terence Young	79	China	Director	James Bond; Bloodline
September	9	Douglas Morrow	80	US	Screenwriter	The Stratton Story; Beyond a Reasonable Doubt
September	9	Patrick O'Neal	66	US	Actor	Under Siege; The Way We Were
September	10	Charles Drake	76	US	Actor	Winchester '73; No Name on the Bullet
September	11	Jessica Tandy	85	UK	Actress	Driving Miss Daisy; Cocoon
September	12	Tom Ewell	85	US	Actor	Adam's Rib; The Seven Year Itch
September	15	Mark Stevens	77	US	Actor	The Dark Corner; The Street with No Name
September	16	Jack Dodson	63	US	Actor	Thunderbolt and Lightfoot; The Getaway
September	17	Iris Adrian	82	US	Actress	Lady of Burlesque; The Paleface
September	18	Wayne Finkelman	47	US	Costume Designer	Overboard; The Golden Child
September	20	Jule Styne	88	UK	Songwriter, Composer	Funny Girl; Three Coins in the Fountain
September	21	Arthur B. Krim	84	US	Studio Executive	
September	23	Robert Bloch	77	US	Screenwriter	Strait-Jacket; Asylum
September	28	Harry Saltzman	78	Canada	Producer	James Bond; Battle of Britain
September	30	Lina Basquette	87	US	Actress	The Godless Girl; The Younger Generation
September	30	Sydney Walker	73	US	Actress	Mrs. Doubtfire; Love Story
October	1	Marjorie Weaver	81	US	Actress	Second Honeymoon; Young Mr. Lincoln
October	2	Harriet Nelson	85	US	Actress	Follow the Fleet; The Falcon Strikes Back
October	3	Virginia Dale	77	US	Actress	Holiday Inn; Dragnet
October	3	Dub Taylor	87	US	Actor	Bonnie & Clyde; The Getaway
October	7	James Hill	75	UK	Director	Born Free; Black Beauty
October	8	Diana Churchill	81	UK	Actress	Jane Steps Out; Yes, Madam?
October	16	Peter Bromilow	61	UK	Actor	Wild at Heart; Highlander II: The Quickening
October	17	Monja Danischewsky	83	Russia	Screenwriter, Producer	The Battle of the Sexes; Topkapi
October	17	Martha Raye	78	US	Actress	Billy Rose's Jumbo; Monsieur Verdoux
October	20	Burt Lancaster	80	US	Actor	From Here to Eternity; Judgment at Nuremberg
October	23	Robert Lansing	66	US	Actor	Empire of the Ants; Namu, the Killer Whale
October	24	Raul Julia	54	Puerto Rico	Actor	The Addams Family; Kiss of the Spider Woman
October	25	Mildred Natwick	89	US	Actress	Dangerous Liaisons; The Trouble with Harry
October	26	Tutta Rolf	87	Norway	Actress	Dressed to Thrill; Dollar
November	1	Noah Beery Jr.	81	US	Actor	Red River; The Best Little Whorehouse in Texas
November	7	Carleton Young	89	US	Actor	The Man Who Shot Liberty Valance; 20,000 Leagues Under the Sea
November	8	Michael O'Donoghue	54	US	Screenwriter, Actor	Scrooged; Wall Street
November	9	Ralph Michael	87	UK	Actor	A Night to Remember; The Assassination Bureau
November	9	Richard Rust	54	US	Actor	Walk on the Wild Side; Homicidal
November	11	Ernest Clark	82	UK	Actor	Gandhi; Memed, My Hawk
November	14	Tom Villard	40	US	Actor	My Girl; Heartbreak Ridge
November	18	Cab Calloway	86	US	Actor, Singer	The Blues Brothers; St. Louis Blues
November	24	Irwin Kostal	83	US	Orchestrator	Mary Poppins; West Side Story
November	27	Rufina Nifontova	63	Russia	Actress	Do Not Part with Your Beloved; Time and the Conways
November	30	Lionel Stander	86	US	Actor	Once Upon a Time in the West; New York, New York
December	5	Alan Splet	54	US	Sound Engineer	Eraserhead; Blue Velvet
December	5	Harry Horner	84	Czech Republic	Production Designer, Director	The Hustler; They Shoot Horses, Don't They?
December	5	Günter Meisner	68	Germany	Actor	Willy Wonka & the Chocolate Factory; The Boys from Brazil
December	6	Gian Maria Volonté	61	Italy	Actor	A Fistful of Dollars; For a Few Dollars More
December	11	Yuli Raizman	90	Russia	Director, Screenwriter	Mashenka; Private Life
December	18	Lilia Skala	98	Hungary	Actress	Lilies of the Field; Flashdance
December	23	Nora Dunfee	78	US	Dialogue Coach, Actress	Witness; Forrest Gump
December	23	Sebastian Shaw	89	UK	Actor	Return of the Jedi; High Season
December	24	Rossano Brazzi	78	Italy	Actor	South Pacific; The Barefoot Contessa
December	24	Julie Haydon	84	US	Actress	The Scoundrel; The Age of Innocence
December	24	John Osborne	65	UK	Actor, Screenwriter	Tom Jones; Get Carter
December	26	Robert Emhardt	81	US	Actor	3:10 to Yuma; Kid Galahad
December	26	Sylva Koscina	61	Croatia	Actress	Hercules; A Lovely Way to Die
December	27	Steve Plytas	81	UK	Actor	The Spy Who Came In from the Cold; Batman
December	29	Frank Thring	68	Australia	Actor	Ben-Hur; Mad Max Beyond Thunderdome
December	31	Woody Strode	80	US	Actor	Spartacus; The Professionals

== Film debuts ==
- Jessica Alba – Camp Nowhere
- Moritz Bleibtreu – Simply Love
- Hugh Bonneville – Mary Shelley's Frankenstein
- Danny Boyle (director) – Shallow Grave
- Richard Brake – Death Machine
- Marylouise Burke – Angie
- Rose Byrne – Dallas Doll
- Margaret Cho – Angie
- Nikolaj Coster-Waldau – Nightwatch
- Marion Cotillard – The Story of a Boy Who Wanted to Be Kissed
- Tony Curran – Being Human
- Claire Danes – Little Women
- Thomas Dekker – Star Trek Generations
- Cameron Diaz – The Mask
- Julie Depardieu – Colonel Chabert
- John DiMaggio – Pom Poko
- Jennifer Ehle – Backbeat
- Eduard Fernández − Souvenir
- William Fichtner – Quiz Show
- Nathan Fillion – Strange and Rich
- Patrick Fischler – Speed
- Jason Flemyng – The Jungle Book
- Carla Gallo – Spanking the Monkey
- Spencer Garrett – The Crow
- Rachel Griffiths – Muriel's Wedding
- Wood Harris – Above the Rim
- Christopher Heyerdahl – Warriors
- John Benjamin Hickey – The Ref
- Marin Hinkle – Angie
- Siobhan Fallon Hogan – Greedy
- Ralph Ineson – Shopping
- Peter Jacobson – It Could Happen to You
- Scarlett Johansson – North
- Greg Kinnear – Blankman
- Phil LaMarr – Pulp Fiction
- Jude Law – Shopping
- Gary Lewis – Shallow Grave
- Melanie Lynskey – Heavenly Creatures
- James Marsden – No Dessert, Dad, till You Mow the Lawn
- Catherine McCormack – Loaded
- Mary McCormack – Miracle on 34th Street
- Helen McCrory – Interview with the Vampire
- Ewan McGregor – Being Human
- Hayden Christensen – In the Mouth of Madness
- Christopher Meloni – Clean Slate
- Jason Mewes – Clerks
- Jonathan Rhys Meyers – A Man of No Importance
- Dash Mihok – Black Is White
- Jennifer Morrison – Intersection
- Carrie-Anne Moss – The Soft Kill
- Pepón Nieto – Running Out of Time
- Jesús Ochoa – La orilla de la tierra
- Sandra Oh – Double Happiness
- Zak Orth – Spanking the Monkey
- Haley Joel Osment – Forrest Gump
- Rena Owen – Rapa Nui
- Candela Peña – Running Out of Time
- Michael Peña – Running Free
- Natalie Portman – Léon: The Professional
- Callum Keith Rennie – Double Happiness
- Andy Richter – Cabin Boy
- Mark Ruffalo – There Goes My Baby
- Colin Salmon – Captives
- Horatio Sanz – Miracle on 34th Street
- Will Sasso – Ski School 2
- Devon Sawa – Little Giants
- Liev Schreiber – Mixed Nuts
- Dougray Scott – Princess Caraboo
- Mathilde Seigner – Le sourire
- Andy Serkis – Prince of Jutland
- Ben Shenkman – Quiz Show
- J. K. Simmons – The Ref
- Kevin Smith – Clerks
- Sebastian Stan – 71 Fragments of a Chronology of Chance
- French Stewart – Stargate
- Jim Sturgess – The Browning Version
- Lew Temple – Angels in the Outfield
- Kenan Thompson – D2: The Mighty Ducks
- Ulrich Thomsen – Nightwatch
- Antonio de la Torre − The Worst Years of Our Lives
- Gregg Turkington − Terminal USA
- Guinevere Turner – Go Fish
- Liv Tyler – Silent Fall
- Alexa Vega – Little Giants
- Mark Wahlberg – Renaissance Man
- Rachel Weisz – Death Machine
- Mae Whitman – When a Man Loves a Woman
- Harland Williams – Dumb and Dumber
- Michelle Williams – Lassie
- Debra Wilson – Cracking Up
- Kate Winslet – Heavenly Creatures
- Robert Wisdom – Clean Slate
- Bokeem Woodbine – Crooklyn
