= Rope climbing at the Olympics =

Former Olympic sport

Rope climbing at the Olympic Games
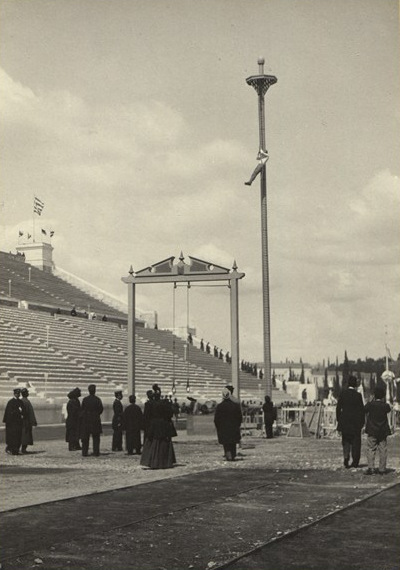
- Rope climbing at the 1896 Olympic Games

Overview
- Sport: Artistic gymnastics
- Gender: Men
- Years held: 1896, 1904, 1924, 1932

Reigning champion
- Men: Raymond Bass (USA)

Rope climbing was an artistic gymnastics event held at the Summer Olympics. It was only held four times: 1896, 1904, 1924, and 1932.

== Medalists ==
Games	Gold	Silver	Bronze
1896 Athens – 14 m (45 ft 11 in)	Nicolaos Andriakopoulos; Greece	Thomas Xenakis; Greece	Fritz Hofmann; Germany
1904 St. Louis – 7.62 m (25 ft 0 in)	George Eyser; United States	Charles Krause; United States	Emil Voigt; United States
1924 Paris – 7.32 m (24 ft 0 in)	Bedřich Šupčík; Czechoslovakia	Albert Séguin; France	August Güttinger; Switzerland
1924 Paris – 7.32 m (24 ft 0 in)	Bedřich Šupčík; Czechoslovakia	Albert Séguin; France	Ladislav Vácha; Czechoslovakia
1932 Los Angeles – 8 m (26 ft 3 in)	Raymond Bass; United States	William Galbraith; United States	Thomas F. Connolly; United States

=== Team medal counts ===
Rank	Nation	Gold	Silver	Bronze	Total
1	United States	2	2	2	6
2	Greece	1	1	0	2
3	Czechoslovakia	1	0	1	2
4	France	0	1	0	1
5	Germany	0	0	1	1
5	Switzerland	0	0	1	1
