= Aerial silk =

Aerial acrobatics

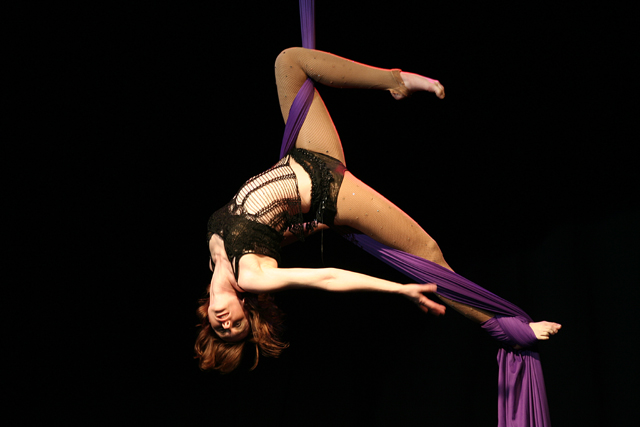
Aerial silk performer

Aerial silk performance

Aerial silks (also known as aerial contortion, aerial ribbons, aerial tissues, fabric, ribbon, or tissu) is a type of performance in which one or more artists perform aerial acrobatics while hanging from a specialist fabric. The fabric may be hung either as two pieces or a single piece folded into a loop, classified as hammock silks. Performers climb the suspended fabric without the use of safety lines and rely only on their training and skill to ensure safety. They use the fabric to wrap, suspend, drop, swing, and spiral their bodies into and out of various positions. The fabric may also be used to fly through the air, striking poses and figures. Some performers use rosin (dried or mixed with rubbing alcohol) on their hands and feet to increase the friction and grip on the fabric. Aerial silks is a demanding art and requires a high degree of strength, power, flexibility, courage and stamina to practise.

== Tricks ==
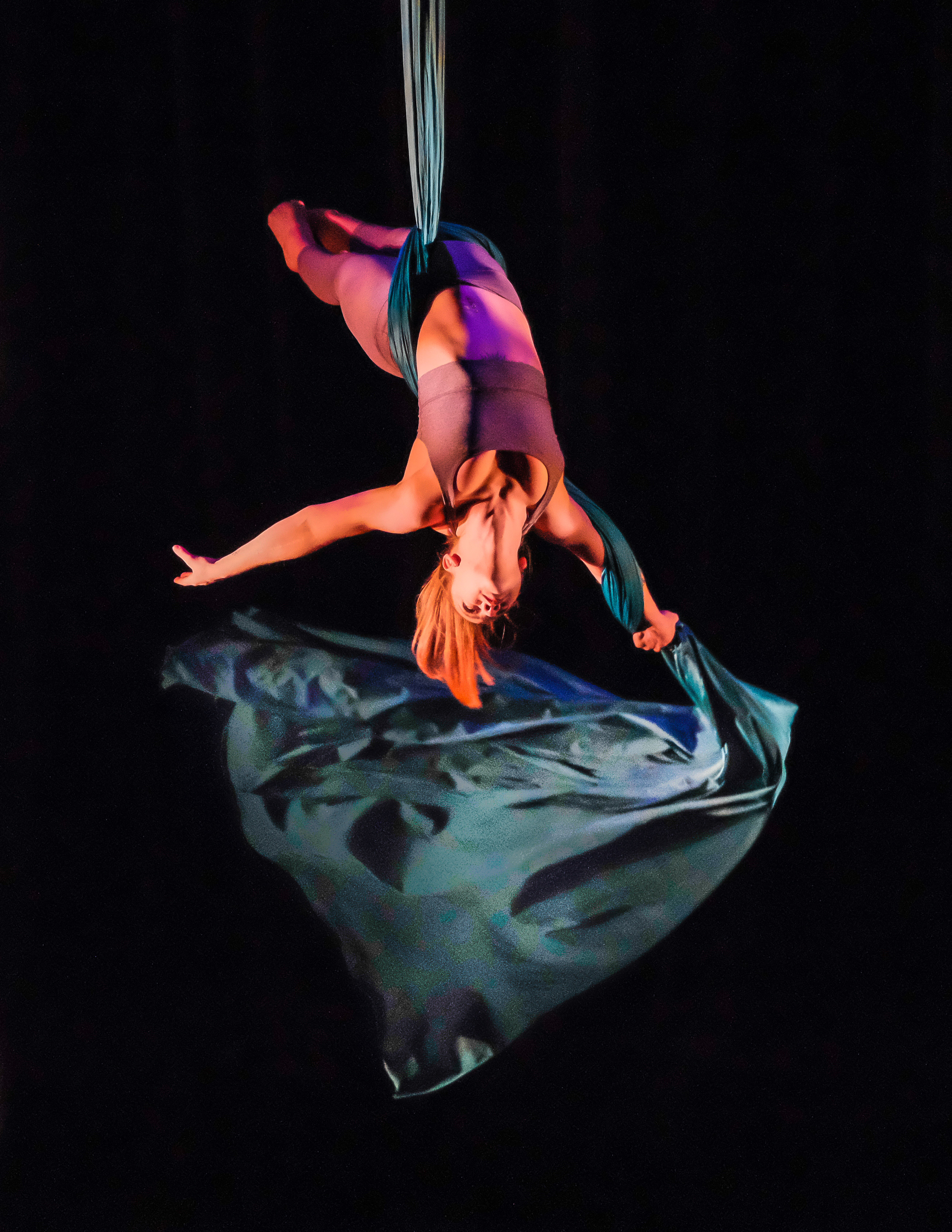
Aerial silk trick

The four main categories of tricks are climbs, wraps, drops, and dives. Climbs employed by aerialists range from predominantly practical and efficient, such as the Russian climb, to athletic and elegant, such as the straddle climb. Wraps are static poses where aerialists wrap the silks around one or more parts of their body. In general, the more complicated the wrap, the stronger the force of friction and the less effort required to hold oneself up. Some wraps, such as the cross-back-straddle, allow performers to completely release their hands. Footlocks are a sub-category of wraps where the silks are wrapped around one or both feet, creating tension on the fabric above. In a drop, performers wrap themselves on the silks before falling to a lower position. Drops can combine aspects of free fall, rolling or otherwise rotating oneself before landing in a new pose. Preparation for a drop can make for a aesthetically pleasing wrap, but the ultimate goal is the fall rather than the pose. Dives, similar to drops, require performers to wrap themselves in the silks, and with a release, the dive is typically just a rotation around themselves, creating a smoother experience. Of the four trick types, drops require the most strength and are also the most potentially dangerous.

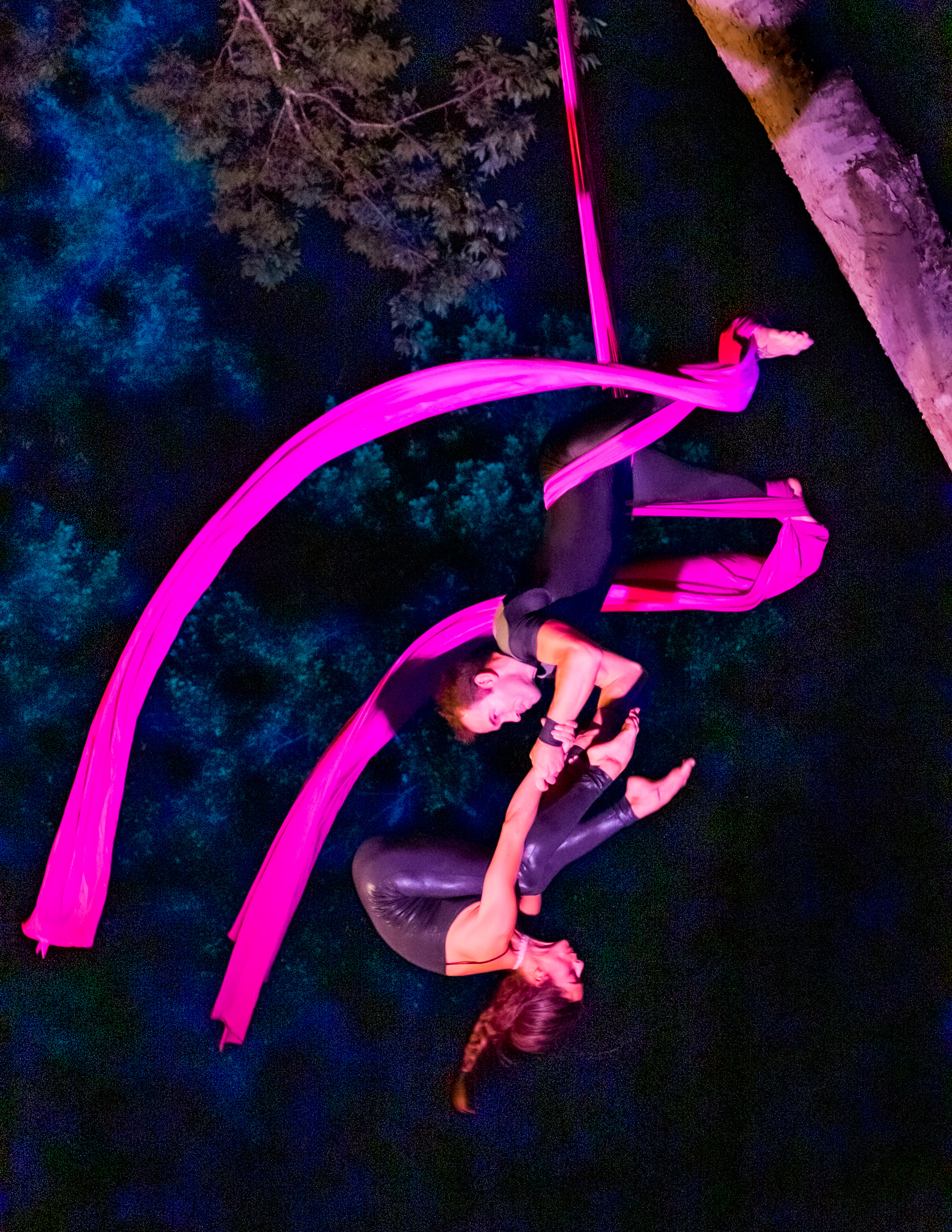
Aerial silk duet

== Fabrics ==
The fabrics used as silks are very strong with some give and flexibility. They are either two-way stretch spandex or nylon. The width varies depending on the routine and the acrobat. The fabric is doubled, giving the artist two strips to work with as they perform.

- Stretch
  - Low-stretch fabrics: Low-stretch fabrics are primarily used by beginners who have not yet developed proper climbing technique.
  - Medium-stretch fabrics: Medium-stretch fabrics are the principal choice of professional aerialists and graduates of professional training programs.
- Width: Fabric width is mostly a personal choice. The thickness of the fabric when gathered is also influenced by the "denier", or technical thickness of the fabric's weave. 40 denier is a common choice. The following applies to 40 denier nylon fabric:
  - 60" - Narrow when open, thin when gathered. Fairly common simply because the fabric is widely available.
  - 72-84" - Average for adult performers
  - 96" - Wide when open, thick when gathered. Best for adults with large hands.
  - 108" - Very wide and thick. For adults with very large hands, or specialty acts.
- Length: Fabric length is a function of the height of the space available.
  - For beginners, it is beneficial if the fabric comes down past the ground, allowing them to practice wraps at a lower level where they can be spotted.
  - For intermediate users and above, it is sufficient if the fabrics come down to the ground.
  - For all users, the space required is usually between 20 feet (6 m) and 30 feet (9 m). There are a great many tricks that can be done on a 12-to-15-foot (3.7 to 4.6 m) aerial fabric and a few drops require more than 30 feet, but for the most part 20 to 30 feet (6 to 9 m) is best.

== History ==
It is not known for certain who invented the art form of performing aerial dance on fabrics. Fred Deb of Drapés Aériens is widely known to be one of the founders around 1992. André Simard was hired by Cirque du Soleil to develop and research acrobatics in 1987; his job was to discover original and imaginative ways to attract audiences, and is also regarded as one of the founders around 1995. Now silks have been incorporated into the circus arts and are also sometimes practised as a form of aerial fitness.

== Famous representatives ==
- Zlata Zaitseva (born 2007), Ukrainian aerial gymnast and a world champion of Pole and Aerial Sports World Championship 2025, held in Buenos Aires, in artistic aerial silks.

== Rigging ==
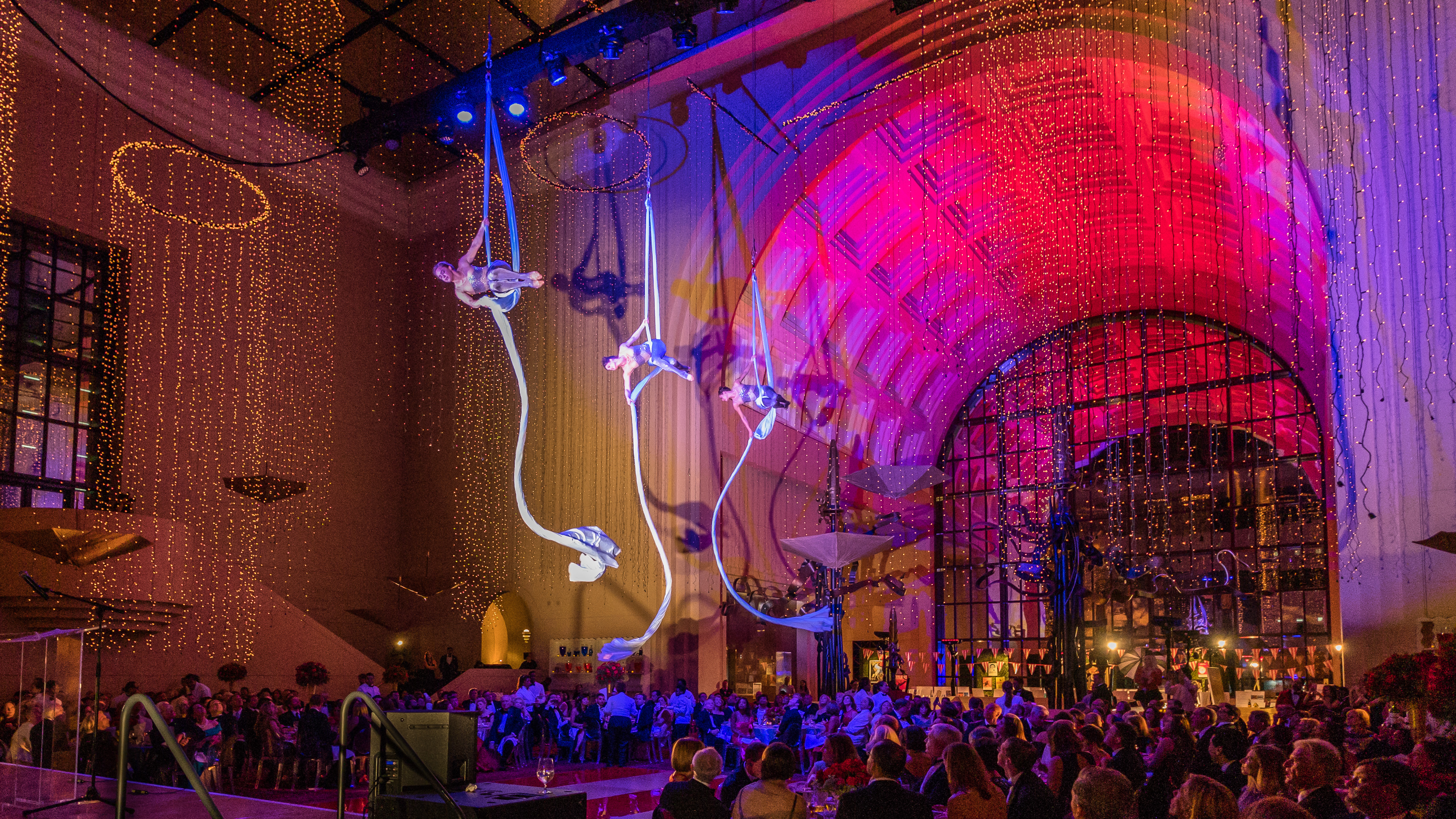
Aerial silks performance

Aerial rigging applies to the hanging of aerial silks. Most rigging hardware falls under the category of personal protective equipment (PPE) and is required to be certified as a fall arrest system. The most common and regarded certification is CE which tested against EN standards created by notifying body's (industry leaders in the EU region). Aerial silk rigging equipment commonly includes:

- a figure-eight descender, rescue eight, ring, or another piece of hardware for attaching the silk;
- a ball-bearing swivel to keep the silk from twisting and to allow for spinning;
- carabiners for connecting the silk hardware to the swivel, and for connecting the swivel to a mounting point. Depending on the setup, there can be multiple carabiners in use at one time.

Carabiners are the most used rigging piece for all aerial arts, but only two or three styles are safe for aerial use; these are the auto lock gate and screw gate carabiner. rated two different ways, one for the spine and one for the gate. Distributing weight on the gate is not recommended, for it is about 1/3 of the spine kN rating. For aerial silk as for other aerial arts, a screw gate carabiner is used rotated to screw down to decrease the risk that the carabiner will accidentally open or that the screw gate will become unscrewed.

- A spanset or daisy chain are often used to add length to the silks if needed; they are also used to wrap around a beam.
- A spanset is a polyester loop that can hold up to 44 kN (10,000 lbs), depending on the quality.
- A daisy chain is made of nylon webbing with loops sewn on, to offer more length variation, but it is less strong then a spanset and may not be able to withstand the downward force of drops and other aerial tricks. A basic daisy chain tops out at around 4 kN (1,000 lbs) on each loop, and end to end is around 22 kN (5,000 lbs).

== See also ==
- Rope climbing
- Aerial hoop
- Aerial dance
- Aerial straps

== Technical references ==
- Basic Circus Arts Instruction Manual: Chapter 2 - "Static Trapeze, Rope and Silks." [PDF, 6.2 MB] and Chapter 8 - "Manual for Safety and Rigging." [PDF, 3.3 MB] European Federation of Professional Circus Schools (FEDEC), 2008.
- Circus Rescues
- Dying Aerial Fabrics
- 32 Aerial Projects to make at home
- Rigging Tricks to Scare Aerialists
- Introduction to Rigging Aerialist Essentials
- Chain Motors Used for Aerials
- Open Web Steel Joists and Aerial Arts
- Rigging to Trees
- Z-Purlins and Aerial Rigging
- Inspecting Trees for Aerial Arts
