= Zlata Zaitseva =

Ukrainian aerial gymnast

- Born: 17 February 2007 (age 19) Rivne, Ukraine

Gymnastics career
- Discipline: Aerial gymnastics (aerial silks)
- Country represented: Ukraine; (2022–now)
- Club: Lova Sport Studio
- Head coach: Viktoriia Khaynatska
- Assistant coaches: Karyna Aleksenko; Iryna Sytnikova (choreographer)
Medal record
Women's aerial gymnastics
Representing Ukraine
World Championships
Gold medal – first place	2025 Buenos Aires	Silk
European Championships
Bronze medal – third place	2025 Prague	Silk
World Junior Championships
Silver medal – second place	2023 Forli	Silk
European Junior Championships
Silver medal – second place	2022 Kadrina	Silk
Silver medal – second place	2024 San Severo	Silk

Zlata Zaitseva (Ukrainian: Злата Зайцева, born 17 February 2007 in Rivne, Ukraine) is a senior Ukrainian aerial gymnast, specializing in aerial silks. She is a world champion of Pole and Aerial Sports World Championship 2025, held in Buenos Aires, in artistic aerial silks.

== Biography ==
Zlata Zaitseva was born on February 17, 2007 in Rivne. She studied at a local school No. 2 and lyceum “Ukrainian".

At the age of six, Zlata began doing ballroom dancing. She began aerial gymnastics at the age of 13 in the studio “Sova Pole Studio”. Now she trains under the guidance of the famous trainer Victoria Khaynatska from Lviv and represents her studio “Lova Sport Studio”.

In 2022, Zaitseva competed at the first POSA European Aerial Championship in Kadrina, winning a silver medal in aerial silks at the category of Juniors B.

In the following year, she represented Ukraine at the CSIT-POSA World Aerial Sport Championship 2023 in Forli, Italy, becoming a vice-champion in her discipline at the category of Juniors B. She also finished 4th at the Pole Sport & Aerial European Championship 2023 in Bologna. Zlata firstly competed at 2023 Pole & Aerial World Cup by U.N.A.

In 2024, Zlata won a second title of European vice-champion at the POSA European Pole Sport & Aerial Championship in San Severo in aerial silks.

In July 2025, at the 3rd European Championships in Prague, she competed at senior competitive category and won a bronze medal. In October, she firstly became a world champion at the Pole and Aerial Sports World Championship, held in Buenos Aires, with an IPSF record.
