= Des Negri =

Australian rules footballer (1923–2003)

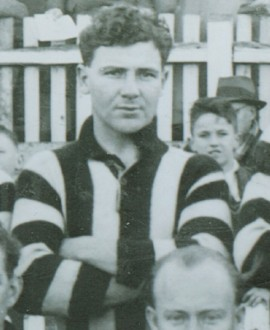
- Negri in 1942

Personal information
- Full name: Desmond James Negri
- Born: 15 November 1923
- Died: 7 May 2003 (aged 79)
- Original team: East Melbourne CYMS (CYMSFA)/ CBC Victoria Parade
- Height: 178 cm (5 ft 10 in)
- Weight: 76 kg (168 lb)

Playing career^{1}
Years	Club	Games (Goals)
1942–45	Collingwood	30 (1)
1945	Richmond	2 (1)
Total		32 (2)
- ^{1} Playing statistics correct to the end of 1945.

Desmond James Negri (15 November 1923 – 7 May 2003) was an Australian rules footballer who played with Collingwood and Richmond in the Victorian Football League (VFL).

== Family ==
The son of Angelo Monigatti Negri (1880–1940), and Adelaide Negri (1892–1944), née Tiernan, Desmond James Negri was born on 15 November 1923.

== Handball ==
Christian Brothers’ College (CBC) Parade strongly promoted handball among its students. The Brothers' view that handball "affords an excellent preparatory training for football, as it calls into play all the resources of the physical man". Handball is a way for a potential Australian Rules footballer to acquire the optimum level of hand–eye coordination, ambidexterity, smoothness and flexibility, and sense of where one is in time and space (e.g., St Kilda's Ted Terry was a schoolboy champion in Tasmania, and Collingwood's Bill Serong, also from CBC Parade, was the Australian handball champion in 1974, aged 38).

Like his older brother, the Collingwood footballer Francis Angelo Negri (1917–1944), as a schoolboy, Negri excelled at handball, and was the Australian Schoolboy Champion in 1939.

== Football ==
=== Collingwood (VFL) ===
Recruited from CYMS Football Association club East Melbourne C.Y.M.S., he played with the Collingwood Second XVIII in 1941, and made his senior debut against Essendon, at Victoria Park, on 30 May 1942.

=== Richmond (VFL) ===
He was cleared from Collingwood to Richmond in June 1945; and in 1945 he played two games for the Richmond First XVIII and 9 games for the Second XVIII.

=== Coburg (VFA) ===
Cleared from Richmond on 21 May 1946, he played in six First XVIII matches for Coburg in 1946. He injured his back and did not play for Coburg again.

=== Australs (NWQAFL) ===
By 1952 he was working in the Mount Isa mines in North West Queensland; and, in 1958 he was the premiership-winning captain-coach of the Mount Isa-based Australs Football Club that competed in the North-Western Queensland Australian Football League.
