= Daltro Menezes =

Brazilian football manager (1938–1994)

Personal information
- Date of birth: 18 January 1938
- Place of birth: Porto Alegre, Brazil
- Date of death: 18 August 1994 (aged 56)
- Place of death: Porto Alegre, Brazil

Managerial career
- Years: Team
- 1968–1971: Internacional
- 1972: Guarani
- 1972: Grêmio
- 1973: Colorado
- 1974: Itabaiana
- 1976: Galícia
- 1977: Juventude
- 1978: Criciúma
- 1980: Coritiba
- 1980: Ceará
- 1981: Santos
- 1981–1982: Vitória
- 1983: Novo Hamburgo
- 1984: Santa Cruz-RS
- 1989: Glória
- 1989: Figueirense
- 1992: Ypiranga-RS

Daltro Menezes (18 January 1938 – 18 August 1994) was a Brazilian football manager.

He coached the clubs Internacional, Guarani, Grêmio Foot-Ball Porto Alegrense, Juventude, Santos, Glória de Vacaria-RS, Vitória, and Coritiba.

He died on 18 August 1994, aged 56.

== Honours ==
Internacional

- Campeonato Gaúcho: 1969, 1970, 1971
