= Gus Leishman =

Australian rules footballer, born 1911

Personal information
- Full name: Gus Leishman
- Born: 5 June 1911
- Died: 24 April 1994 (aged 82)
- Original team: Kingston
- Height: 173 cm (5 ft 8 in)
- Weight: 73 kg (161 lb)

Playing career^{1}
Years	Club	Games (Goals)
1932–34	Geelong	27 (14)
- ^{1} Playing statistics correct to the end of 1934.

Gus Leishman (5 June 1911 – 24 April 1994) was an Australian rules footballer who played with Geelong in the Victorian Football League (VFL).
