= Chris Carroll =

Australian rules footballer

Personal information
- Full name: Christopher Arthur Carroll
- Born: 6 March 1924; Broken Hill, New South Wales
- Died: 16 April 1994 (aged 70); Adelaide, South Australia
- Original teams: St George, Centrals (Broken Hill)
- Height: 180 cm (5 ft 11 in)
- Weight: 80 kg (176 lb)

Playing career^{1}
Years	Club	Games (Goals)
1947–1948	North Melbourne	13 (18)
- ^{1} Playing statistics correct to the end of 1948.

Christopher Arthur Carroll (6 March 1924 – 16 April 1994) was an Australian rules footballer who played with North Melbourne in the Victorian Football League (VFL).

Carroll served in the Australian Army from 1942 to 1946.

Carroll, a left footer, trained with North Melbourne in late 1946 and impressed and moved to Melbourne from the Centrals Football Club in Broken Hill, New South Wales.

Carroll made his debut in round four, 1947 against Fitzroy, kicking one goal.
