= Gaston Bauer =

Luxembourgish footballer

Personal information
- Date of birth: 31 January 1936
- Date of death: 9 April 1994 (aged 58)
- Position: Midfielder

International career
Years	Team	Apps	(Gls)
1959–1961	Luxembourg	9	(0)

Gaston Bauer (31 January 1936 – 9 April 1994) was a Luxembourgish footballer. He played in nine matches for the Luxembourg national football team from 1959 to 1961.
