= Annibale Pelaschiar =

Italian sailor

Annibale Pelaschiar (25 February 1912 – 29 August 1994) was an Italian sailor who competed in the 1956 Summer Olympics and in the 1964 Summer Olympics.
