= Frank Negri =

Australian rules footballer (1917–1994)

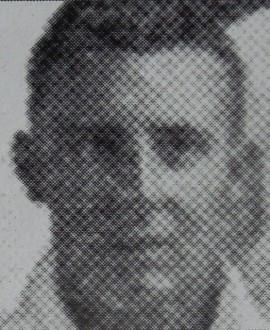
- Negri in 1943

Personal information
- Full name: Francis Angelo Negri
- Born: 1 November 1917; Malvern East, Victoria
- Died: 8 August 1994 (aged 76)
- Original team: Teachers Training College
- Height: 175 cm (5 ft 9 in)
- Weight: 77 kg (170 lb)

Playing career^{1}
| Years | Club | Games (Goals) |
| 1943 | Collingwood | 6 (0) |
- ^{1} Playing statistics correct to the end of 1943.

Francis Angelo Negri (1 November 1917 – 8 August 1994) was an Australian rules footballer who played with Collingwood in the Victorian Football League (VFL).

== Family ==
The son of Angelo Monigatti Negri (1880-1940), and Adelaide Negri (1892-1944), née Tiernan, Francis Angelo Negri was born on 1 November 1917.

His younger brother, Des Negri, also played VFL football for Collingwood.

== War Service & Football ==
Negri served in the Australian Army from 1942 to 1947, spending 12 months at Duntroon Military College and being commissioned as an officer in 1943. He played six games for Collingwood during his period of war service, and at the end of 1945 was working in the Records Office.

== Country Umpire ==
Negri later became an umpire in Victorian country leagues.
