= Bert Graham (footballer) =

Australian rules footballer

Personal information
- Full name: Hubert James Graham
- Born: 1 March 1921; Prahran, Victoria
- Died: 11 August 1994 (aged 73)
- Height: 185 cm (6 ft 1 in)
- Weight: 79 kg (174 lb)

Playing career^{1}
Years	Club	Games (Goals)
1940–1942	Hawthorn	23 (9)
- ^{1} Playing statistics correct to the end of 1942.

Hubert James Graham (1 March 1921 – 11 August 1994) was an Australian rules footballer who played for the Hawthorn Football Club in the Victorian Football League (VFL).

Graham later served in the Australian Army during World War II.
