= Jack Giles =

Australian rules footballer

Personal information
- Full name: Leonard George Giles
- Born: 17 June 1921; Yorketown, South Australia
- Died: 23 August 1994 (aged 73); Glandore, South Australia

Playing career^{1}
Years	Club	Games (Goals)
1941–1942, 1946–1951	Sturt	95 (30)
1943	Richmond	1 (0)
- ^{1} Playing statistics correct to the end of 1951.

Career highlights
- Sturt captain 1949

Jack Giles
Cricket information
- Batting: Right-handed
- Role: Batsman

Domestic team information
- Years: Team
- 1950/51-1951/52: South Australia

Career statistics
Competition	First-class
Matches	5
Runs scored	164
Batting average	20.50
100s/50s	0/1
Top score	54
Catches/stumpings	4/0
- Source: CricInfo

Leonard George "Jack" Giles (17 June 1921 – 23 August 1994) was an Australian rules footballer who played with Sturt in the South Australian National Football League (SANFL), and cricketer, who represented South Australia. He was appointed captain of Sturt in 1949.

In 1942 he enlisted in the Australian Defence Force, joining the 112th Australian Light Anti Aircraft Regiment, and in 1943 he played one game for Richmond in the Victorian Football League.
