= Raymond Bass =

- Full name: Raymond Henry Bass
- Nickname: Benny
- Born: January 15, 1910 Chambersville, Arkansas, U.S.
- Died: March 10, 1997 (aged 87) Los Angeles, California, U.S.
- Height: 5 ft 6 in (168 cm)

Gymnastics career
- Discipline: Men's artistic gymnastics
- Country represented: United States
- College team: Navy Midshipmen (1930–1931)
- Head coach: Louis Mang
- Retired: c. 1932
Medal record
Men's artistic gymnastics
Representing United States
Event	1st	2nd	3rd
Olympic Games	1	0	0
Total	1	0	0
Olympic Games
Gold medal – first place	1932 Los Angeles	Rope climbing
- Military career
- Allegiance: United States
- Branch: United States Navy
- Service years: 1931–1959
- Rank: Rear Admiral
- Conflicts: World War II

Raymond Henry "Benny" Bass (January 15, 1910 – March 10, 1997) was a gymnast who represented the United States. As a member of the United States men's national artistic gymnastics team, he was an Olympic gold medalist in the 1932 Summer Olympics.

He competed at the 1932 Summer Olympics in Los Angeles where he won a gold medal in rope climbing. He also served as a Rear Admiral in the United States Navy.

Bass died on March 10, 1997, at the age of 87.
