= Rolf Schønheyder =

Norwegian sprinter

Personal information
- Nationality: Norwegian
- Born: 24 June 1913
- Died: 21 April 1994 (aged 80)

Sport
- Sport: Sprinting
- Event: 400 metres

Rolf Schønheyder (24 June 1913 – 21 April 1994) was a Norwegian sprinter. He competed in the men's 400 metres at the 1936 Summer Olympics.
