= Thomas F. Connolly =

American Navy admiral, aviator and gymnast (1909–1996)

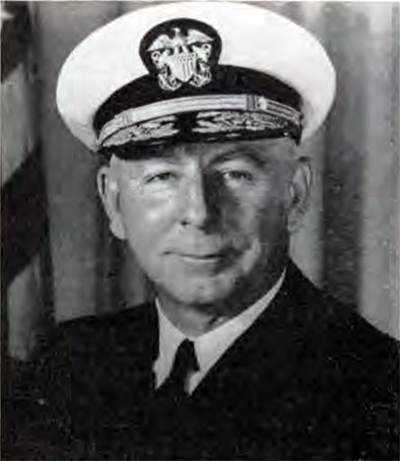
- Thomas F. Connolly in 1965
- Born: October 24, 1909; St. Paul, Minnesota, U.S.
- Died: May 24, 1996 (aged 86); Holland, Michigan, U.S.
- Spouse: Margaret Hagy Connolly
- Children: Thomas F. Connolly Jr. Susan Connolly Moya
- Military career
- Allegiance: United States of America
- Branch: United States Navy
- Service years: 1933-1971
- Rank: Vice Admiral
- Commands: VPB-13; USS Hornet (CV-12); Carrier Division Seven; Naval Air Forces Pacific
- Conflicts: World War II
- Awards: Legion of Merit (2); Distinguished Flying Cross (3); Air Medal (3)

Gymnastics career
- Discipline: Men's artistic gymnastics
- Country represented: United States
Medal record
Men's artistic gymnastics
Representing United States
Event	1st	2nd	3rd
Olympic Games	0	0	1
Total	0	0	1
Olympic Games
Bronze medal – third place	1932 Los Angeles	Rope climbing

Vice Admiral Thomas Francis Connolly Jr. (October 24, 1909 – May 24, 1996) was a three-star rank admiral in the United States Navy, aviator, and gymnast. As a member of the United States men's national artistic gymnastics team, he won an Olympic bronze medal at the 1932 Summer Olympics.

Connolly served in the Navy for 38 years. Over his career he served in World War II, oversaw the development of a program that later evolved into the United States Naval Test Pilot School, commanded two aircraft carriers, and served as Deputy Chief of Naval Operations for Air Warfare, retiring from that post in 1971.

Connolly was instrumental in developing the Grumman F-14 Tomcat. The plane was named in his honor and for Thomas Hinman Moorer, then Chief of Naval Operations.

== Early life and education ==
Connolly was born in St. Paul, Minnesota. Most of his childhood was spent in Los Angeles. He attended the University of California, Los Angeles. In 1929, he received an appointment for the United States Naval Academy.

== Olympics ==
Connolly competed at the 1932 Summer Olympics in Los Angeles where he received a bronze medal in rope climbing. This was the fourth and last time this was an Olympic event. There were five competitors in the event.

== Naval career ==
Connolly graduated 52nd out of a class of 435 at the Naval Academy. Following graduation from the Naval Academy in 1933, Connolly was ordered to Naval Air Station Pensacola for flight training and subsequently received his naval aviator wings. In 1939 he was assigned to conduct postgraduate studies in aeronautical engineering at the Naval Academy. He received a master's degree in the subject at the Massachusetts Institute of Technology in 1942. In March 1943, Connolly assumed command of Patrol Squadron 13, at which time they were flying Consolidated PB2Y Coronado aircraft. He remained at that posting until September 1944. During his time in command, the unit saw action at the Gilbert Islands, the Marshall Islands, and bombed Wake Island. While serving in command of this unit, he was awarded the Distinguished Flying Cross and the Air Medal, both with two gold stars indicating additional awards.

In 1944, Connolly was assigned to Naval Air Station Patuxent River as Assistant Director of Flight Test. He became one of the first 50 USN pilots to pilot a jet plane, flying a YP-59A on February 24, 1945. During his time at Patuxent, Connolly found nobody communicated in the same technical language as he worked with multiple personnel from different fields. As a result, he recommended starting a school within the command to train pilots and engineers to use the same language. This school began operating in 1945. This school became the Test Pilot Training Division, and would later evolve into the United States Navy Test Pilot School. In early 1947, he commenced a tour at sea as executive officer of USS Rendova, completing the tour in September 1948. Connolly returned to Patuxent and became the second commander of the Test Pilot School in December 1948. In 1948 while at Patuxtent, he co-authored the textbook "Airplane Aerodynamics", which became a standard textbook at multiple universities. While in command of the school, he qualified as a helicopter pilot. Connolly remained the commander of the school until April 1951. In June 1951 he assumed command of Heavy Attack Squadron Six (VAH-6), remaining in that post until July 1952. His next posting came that month as the Experimental Officer at the Naval Ordnance Test Station.

On August 21, 1957, he assumed command of the aircraft carrier USS Hornet. During his time as commander, Hornet deployed to the Western Pacific in the United States Seventh Fleet area of operations. He remained in command until August 25, 1958. In 1958, he assumed the position of Assistant Chief of the Pacific Missile Range within the Bureau of Aeronautics. It was during this time that he put together a group that came to be known as the "Connolly Committee". That group's seminal work was "The Navy in the Space Age". This group's work and recommendations were approved by the Chief of Naval Operations on July 13, 1959, and became pivotal in the development of the Navy Navigation Satellite System, the first system of its kind in the world. Following this posting, Connolly was Commander, Carrier Division Seven.

From May 18, 1964, to August 28, 1965, he was Assistant Chief of Naval Operations for Fleet Operations and Readiness. During this posting, he was the Director of the Combat Consumables Requirement Study (Non-Nuclear Ordnance Study), for which he received the Legion of Merit. On October 30, 1965, he became Commander, Naval Air Forces Pacific in a ceremony held onboard the carrier USS Ranger. On November 1, 1966, he was appointed to the position of Deputy Chief of Naval Operations for Air Warfare. He remained in that posting until his retirement on August 31, 1971.

=== Role in F-14 development ===
During the time of his posting as DCNO for Air Warfare, the Navy was developing the TFX Program together with the Air Force. The Navy's version of this replacement for the F4 Phantom II was the General Dynamics–Grumman F-111B. As American air operations in the Vietnam War ramped up, the Navy's requirements for the plane evolved to include capabilities for air combat manoeuvring, a task for which the F-111 was not designed. Responding to this, Connolly set out requirements for a replacement naval interceptor. In 1968, during testimony before the United States Senate Committee on Armed Services, Connolly was asked by chairman John C. Stennis for his opinion on what would make the F-111B work for naval service. He responded, "There isn't enough power in all Christendom to make that airplane what we want!". On being contradicted by Secretary of the Navy Paul Ignatius, who referenced a report written by Connolly the prior year that praised the F-111B, Connolly reversed himself. Nevertheless, Connolly's testimony was the death knell for the F-111B project, with it being cancelled in May 1968. Subsequently, Connolly effectively became the F-14 project manager.

== Later life ==
Following retirement, Connolly lived in the McLean, Virginia, area until the early 1990s, when he moved to Holland, Michigan. He worked as a consultant on national defense. Connolly died May 24, 1996, in Holland, Michigan, from emphysema and an aortic aneurysm at the age of 86. His wife of 58 years died April 26, 2010.

== Honors ==
Connolly was awarded Tailhooker Of The Year in 1969 by the Tailhook Association. In 1998 he was inducted into the Naval Aviation Hall of Honor, and in 1999, he was inducted into the Michigan Aviation Hall of Fame.

== See also ==
- Revolt of the Admirals, an earlier case in which naval officers gave testimony to Congress in contradiction to administration demands

== Sources ==
- Roberts, Michael D., Dictionary of American Naval Aviation Squadrons, Volume 2 (PDF), Naval Historical Center
- Evans, Mark L.; Grossnick, Roy A. (2015a), "Part II" (PDF), United States Naval Aviation 1910-2010 (PDF), vol. 2, Naval History and Heritage Command
- Evans, Mark L.; Grossnick, Roy A. (2015b), "8" (PDF), United States Naval Aviation 1910-2010 (PDF), vol. 1, Naval History and Heritage Command
- Evans, Mark L.; Grossnick, Roy A. (2015c), "Part III" (PDF), United States Naval Aviation 1910-2010 (PDF), vol. 2, Naval History and Heritage Command
