= George Stewart (footballer, born 1901) =

Australian rules footballer

Personal information
- Full name: George Stewart
- Born: 19 September 1901
- Died: 26 August 1994 (aged 92)

Playing career^{1}
Years	Club	Games (Goals)
1925	South Melbourne	13 (1)
- ^{1} Playing statistics correct to the end of 1925.

George Stewart (19 September 1901 – 26 August 1994) was an Australian rules footballer who played with South Melbourne in the Victorian Football League (VFL).
