= Horrie Stanway =

Australian rules footballer, born 1908

Personal information
- Full name: Horace Horton Stanway
- Born: 11 November 1908; Paynesville, Victoria
- Died: 10 August 1994 (aged 85)
- Original team: Chelsea
- Height: 175 cm (5 ft 9 in)
- Weight: 70 kg (154 lb)

Playing career^{1}
Years	Club	Games (Goals)
1930–31	Footscray	20 (4)
1932	Richmond	1 (0)
Total		21 (4)
- ^{1} Playing statistics correct to the end of 1932.

Horace Horton Stanway (11 November 1908 – 10 August 1994) was an Australian rules footballer who played with Footscray and Richmond in the Victorian Football League (VFL).
