= Arthur Muhl =

Australian cricketer

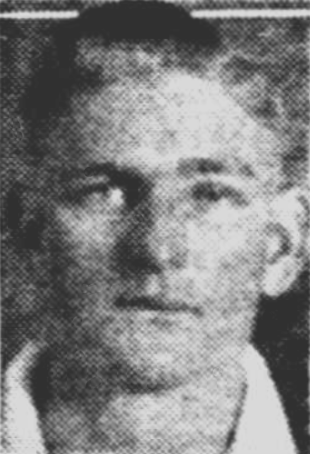

Personal information
- Born: 12 February 1913; Brisbane, Queensland, Australia
- Died: 17 April 1994 (aged 81); Brisbane, Queensland, Australia
- Source: Cricinfo, 5 October 2020

Arthur Muhl (12 February 1913 – 17 April 1994) was an Australian cricketer. He played in two first-class matches for Queensland in 1935/36. He also played for South Brisbane District Cricket Club.

== See also ==
- List of Queensland first-class cricketers
