= Norm Stott =

Australian rules footballer, born 1904

Personal information
- Full name: Norman W. Stott
- Born: 21 March 1904
- Died: 3 August 1994 (aged 90)
- Original team: Ivanhoe
- Height: 183 cm (6 ft 0 in)
- Weight: 81 kg (179 lb)

Playing career^{1}
| Years | Club | Games (Goals) |
| 1929–30 | Fitzroy | 12 (5) |
- ^{1} Playing statistics correct to the end of 1930.

Norm Stott (21 March 1904 – 3 August 1994) was an Australian rules footballer who played with Fitzroy in the Victorian Football League (VFL).
