= Keith Park (footballer) =

Australian rules footballer

Personal information
- Full name: Keith Charles Park
- Born: 29 May 1920; Geelong, Victoria
- Died: 9 April 1994 (aged 73)
- Original team: Lake Bolac
- Height: 185 cm (6 ft 1 in)
- Weight: 85 kg (187 lb)

Playing career^{1}
Years	Club	Games (Goals)
1945–46	Geelong	14 (1)
- ^{1} Playing statistics correct to the end of 1946.

Keith Charles Park (29 May 1920 – 9 April 1994) was an Australian rules footballer who played with Geelong in the Victorian Football League (VFL).

Park served in the Australian Army during World War II prior to playing with Geelong.
