= Alan Nutter =

Australian rules footballer

Personal information
- Full name: Alan John Nutter
- Born: 6 December 1920; Brunswick, Victoria
- Died: 16 August 1994 (aged 73)
- Height: 173 cm (5 ft 8 in)
- Weight: 78 kg (172 lb)

Playing career^{1}
Years	Club	Games (Goals)
1943	Richmond	1 (0)
1945–46	Brighton (VFA)	11 (10)
- ^{1} Playing statistics correct to the end of 1943.

Alan John Nutter (6 December 1920 – 16 August 1994) was an Australian rules footballer who played for the Richmond Football Club in the Victorian Football League (VFL).

Nutter served in both the Australian Army and Royal Australian Navy in World War II.
