= Bill J. Griffith =

Australian rules footballer, born 1905

Bill Griffith

Personal information
- Full name: Bill Griffith
- Born: 12 December 1905
- Died: 27 August 1994 (aged 88)
- Original team: Essendon Reserves

Playing career^{1}
Years	Club	Games (Goals)
1930	Richmond	1 (0)
- ^{1} Playing statistics correct to the end of 1930.

Bill Griffith (12 December 1905 – 27 August 1994) was a former Australian rules footballer who played with Richmond in the Victorian Football League (VFL).
