= Cécile Dreesmann =

Dutch artist (1920–1994)

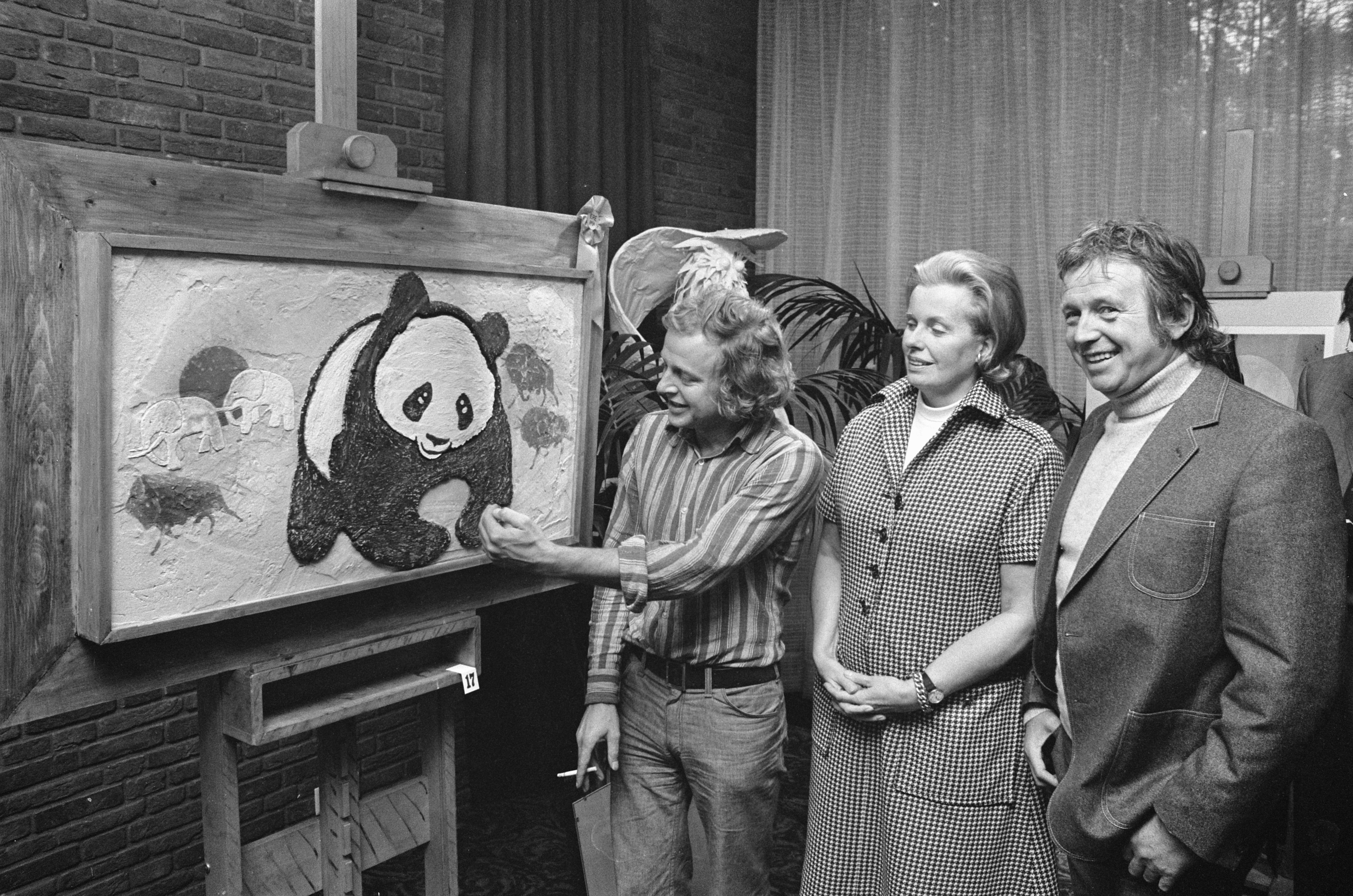
Cecile Dreesmann, David Houthuyse en Toon Hermans

Cécile Dreesmann (13 April 1920, in Amsterdam – 23 April 1994, in Soest) was a Dutch textile artist known for her innovative embroidery. She was particularly fond of working with silk, adding precious or semi-precious stones to the work of thread, creating volumes, like thread sculpture. She always defended embroidery as a form of personal art, in which everyone has to find their own way. She also published a number of books on textile art. She was a member of the wealthy Dutch Dreesmann family, connected to the Vroom & Dreesmann department stores.

== Life ==
Cecilia Antonia Maria Wilhelmina (Cécile) Dreesmann was the fifth of seven children to Willem Dreesmann, the heir to department stores Vroom & Dreesmann and Anna Maria Alphonsa Peek. She grew up in a large, better-off Catholic family.

Cécile Dreesmann was an accomplished sportswoman, riding champion, she participated in the Tokyo Olympic Games in 1964 for the Netherlands but a serious ski accident ended her sports career.

She studied at the Royal School of Needlework in London and she preferred to use silk and often included precious stones or minerals in her work.

== Art ==
Ten years later, she worked her life on embroidery to develop her own specific style, taught it, lectured, wrote books and published articles in journals like the very exclusive English magazine Embroidery. She created projects for fashion houses and appeared on radio and television broadcasts in the Netherlands and England, notably in the television program De Stoel.

Subsequently, she returned to the Netherlands and lived on a farm in Laren, surrounded by animals, fields and tranquility. But she moved a lot, traveling the world for her research on the history of traditional embroidery and its current practice, lived and worked in various places in the Netherlands and abroad, mainly in Amsterdam where she had a studio in Anna van den Vondel street and in Laren but also had an apartment in New York. At the end of her life, she used to live in Soest.

Her name is closely linked to embroidery. After researching the history of this art and its practices in different countries, she developed her own style. She worked a lot with silk, her favorite material, adding precious stones, semi-precious stones and other materials such as feathers. She developed volumes to make sculptures. She always defended embroidery as a form of personal art, in which everyone must find their own way.

In her studio on Anna van den Vondel street in Amsterdam, she realized her projects and, with her collaborators, taught the art of embroidery, wrote and managed her publications on the subject. She is the author of eight books on the history and techniques of embroidery, one of which was published in the United States.

Cécile Dreesmann, died on Saturday, April 23, 1994, at the age of 74 in her home above the Anna Paulowna house in Soest, which houses the Cécile Dreesmann museum.

== Exhibitions (selection) ==
Her works were exhibited in The Netherlands, but also in the United States.

- 1961: Borduren met Cécile Dreesmann, exhibition in the studio of the silversmith Nico Huisman.
- 1964: Te Vuur en te naald, Bookshop Paul Brinkman.
- 1967: New York
- 1973: Exhibition of needlework sculpture of Cécile Dreesmann, Laren.
- 1979: Stenen Festijn, Museum Singer, Laren.
- 1990: Needlework sculpture of Cécile Dreesmann, Castle De Hooge Vuursche, Baarn

== Bibliography ==
- (nl) Steekspel, Wereldvenster, 1964
- (nl) De gestroomlijnde naald (Baedeker voor de vrouw deel 16); illustrated by Cécile Dreesmann), Nederlandse Boekenclub, ´s-Gravenhage, 1965,
- (nl) Merklappen oud en nieuw, Wageningen, Zomer & Keuning, 1967, ASIN: B003C7J3EC
- (nl) Avonturen van een naald, Groningen, Wolters-Noordhoff, 1973
- (nl) Cécile: Cécile Dreesmann vertelt over haar levenswerk, Zuid-Hollandsche U.M, 1974, (ISBN 9789023580928)
- (nl) De stamboom van Oranje, Mingus, 1982, (ISBN 9789065640291)
- (nl) Het huis van Harlekĳn, Thieme, 1986, (ISBN 9789003901101)
- (nl) Het erfgoed, novel, De Boekerij, 1989, (ISBN 9789022509913)
- (nl) Rob Kerstens,, Sprookjes onder de wingerd ( illustrated by Cécile Dreesmann), Skarabee, 1977, (ISBN 9789060712030)
- (nl) Mandersens, novel, Amsterdam, De Boekerij, 1988
- (nl) Borduurkunst, Amsterdam, Strengholt, 1066
- (nl) Borduurkunst II, Dagboek van een borduurster, Amsterdam, Strengholt, 1967
- (en+nl) Dreams, Mingus, 1982, (ISBN 978-9065640284)
- (nl) De vorstinnen van Thorn, Ef & Ef / Hub Tonnaer, 1988
- (nl) Borduren met Cécile Dreesmann, Amsterdam, Strengholt, 1979, (ISBN 9789060104484). Read on line
- (nl) De gestroomlijnde naald, La Haye, NBC
- (nl) Varia van het borduren
- (nl) Als naalden dromen (ISBN 9065903658)
- (nl) Door het oog van duizend naalden, Stok Publisher, (ISBN 9023580907)
- (nl) Cécile Dreesmann vertelt over haar levenswerk, Zuid-Hollandsche U.M, 1974 (ISBN 9789023580928)
- (en) Embroidery, MacMillan, 1969, (ISBN 9780025334700)
- (nl) Borduurkunst Praktische handleiding voor beginners en gevorderden, Amsterdam, Strengholt, 1966.
- (en) Samplers for today, Van Nostrand Reinhold, 1972, (ISBN 9780442221782)
