= List of crime films of 1994 =

This is a list of crime films released in 1994.

| Title | Director | Cast | Country | Notes |
|---|---|---|---|---|
| L'Enfer | Claude Chabrol | Emmanuelle Béart, François Cluzet, Nathalie Cardone | France | Crime drama |
| Fresh | Boaz Yakin | Sean Nelson, Giancarlo Esposito, Samuel L. Jackson | United States | Crime drama |
| Heavenly Creatures | Peter Jackson | Melanie Lynskey, Kate Winslet, Sarah Peirse | New Zealand | Crime drama |
| Killing Zoe | Roger Avary | Eric Stoltz, Julie Delpy, Jean-Hugues Anglade | United States; France | |
| The Last Seduction | John Dahl | Linda Fiorentino, Peter Berg, Bill Pullman | United States | |
| Léon: The Professional | Luc Besson | Jean Reno, Gary Oldman, Natalie Portman, Danny Aiello | France | Action thriller |
| Little Odessa | James Gray | Tim Roth, Edward Furlong, Moira Kelly, Maximilian Schell, Vanessa Redgrave | United States | |
| Love and a .45 | C. M. Talkington | Gil Bellows, Renée Zellweger, Rory Cochrane | United States | |
| Natural Born Killers | Oliver Stone | Woody Harrelson, Juliette Lewis, Robert Downey Jr., Tommy Lee Jones, Tom Sizemore | United States | |
| Nobody | Toshimichi Ohkawa | Riki Takeuchi, Jinpachi Nezu, Hideo Nakano | Japan | |
| Organized Crime & Triad Bureau | Kirk Wong Chi-Keung | Danny Lee Sau-Yin, Anthony Wong Chau-Sang | Hong Kong | |
| Pulp Fiction | Quentin Tarantino | John Travolta, Samuel L. Jackson, Uma Thurman, Bruce Willis, Harvey Keitel, Ving Rhames, Tim Roth, Amanda Plummer, Eric Stoltz, Rosanna Arquette, Maria de Medeiros, Christopher Walken | United States | |
| See How They Fall | Jacques Audiard | Jean-Louis Trintignant, Jean Yanne, Mathieu Kassovitz | France | |
| Shallow Grave | Danny Boyle | Kerry Fox, Christopher Eccleston, Ewan McGregor | United Kingdom | |
| The Shawshank Redemption | Frank Darabont | Tim Robbins, Morgan Freeman | United States | Prison film |
| Shrunken Heads | Richard Elfman | Meg Foster, Julius Harris, Aeryk Egan | United States | |
| Sugar Hill | Leon Ichaso | Wesley Snipes, Michael Wright, Theresa Randle | United States | |
