= Reginald Parkin =

English cricketer

Reginald Henry Parkin (25 July 1909 – 16 April 1994) was an English cricketer active from 1931 to 1939 who played for Lancashire. He was born in Tunstall and died in Stockport. He appeared in 21 first-class matches as a righthanded batsman who bowled right arm off break. He scored 286 runs with a highest score of 60 and held four catches. He took 23 wickets with a best analysis of three for 52.
