= Rope climbing =

Sport

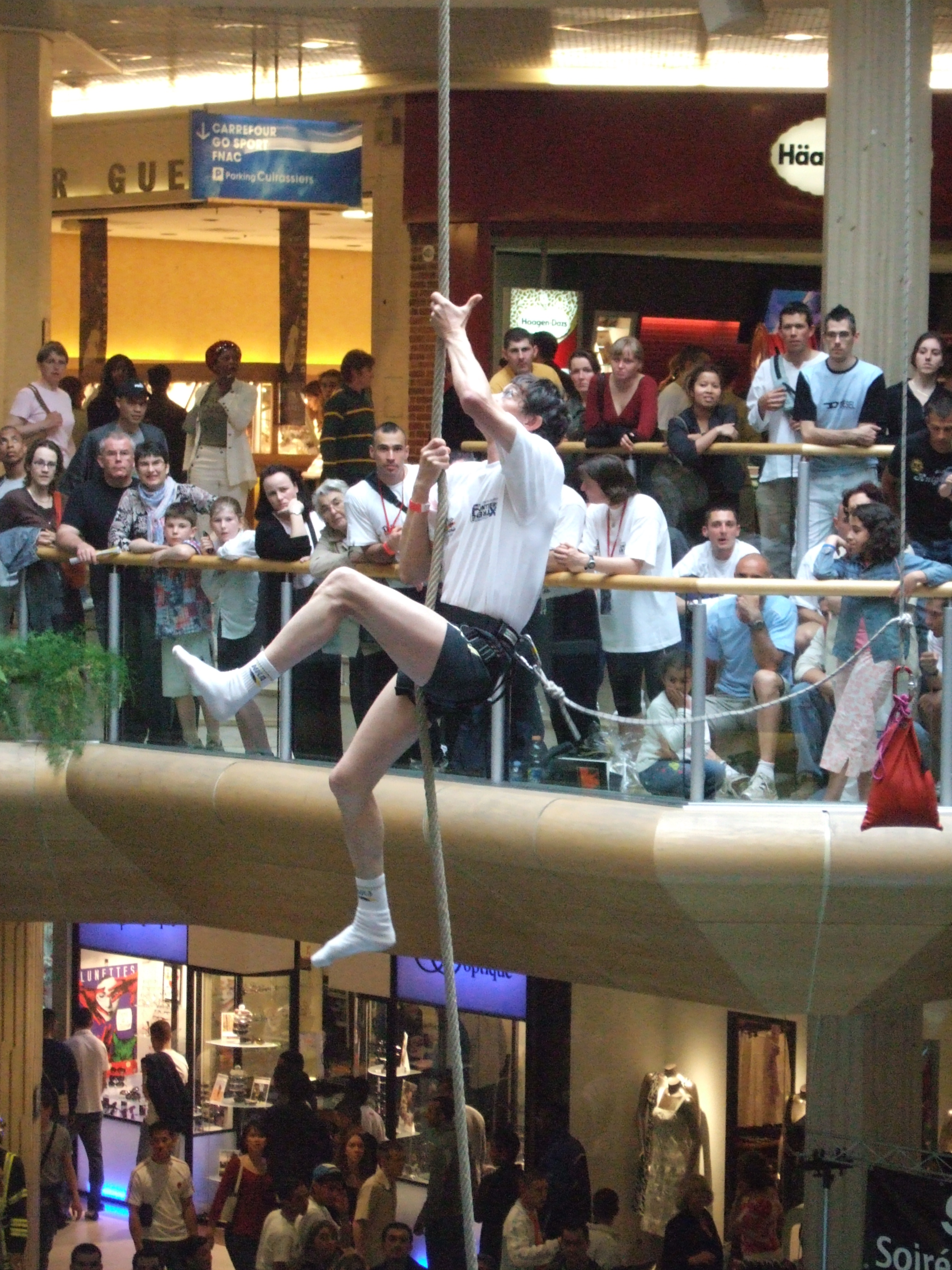
Rope climbing at Lyon's Part-Dieu shopping centre

Rope climbing is a sport in which competitors attempt to climb up a suspended vertical rope using only their hands. Rope climbing is practiced regularly at the World Police and Fire Games. Also, enthusiasts in the Czech Republic resurrected the sport in 1993, and hold local and national competitions.

== History and description of the event ==
This was an Olympic gymnastic event at one time, but was removed from that venue after the 1932 games. In the United States, competitive climbing on both 20 ft and 25 ft, 1.5-inch-diameter (38 mm) natural fiber ropes was sanctioned by both the AAU and the NCAA until the early 1960s, when these organizations dropped the events. As a result, intercollegiate competition in the U.S. disappeared at this time. In Olympic Games held in the U.S., competitors climbed a 25 ft (7.62m) rope, but when post-1896 games were held in Europe, an 8 m (26.3 ft) rope was used. In almost all contests, athletes climbed for speed, starting from a seated position on the floor and using only the hands and arms. Kicking the legs in a kind of "stride" was normally permitted. However, at the 1896 Olympic games, competitors were ranked by both time and style (holding an L-position) on a rope so long (15 meters) that some climbers did not reach the top and were therefore excluded. In all succeeding Olympics through the 1932 games, competitors were judged strictly by the time of ascent on a shorter rope.

At the top of the climb, there was a circular tambourine with lampblack on its underside, which the climber touched. Several timers with stop watches timed the climb, and an acceptable official time was then agreed upon. Before the event expired in America, an electronic means of timing the climb was developed, but this was an insufficient reason to continue an activity conducted at gymnastic meets that many artistic gymnasts thought should have been relegated to the track and field arena. The world record for the 20 foot climb was 2.8 seconds, first achieved by the American Don Perry in the 1950s.

== World records ==
- The Official Guinness World Record for Rope Climb requires a set standard of a 5-meter rope with a 60-second time limit using hands only from a seated position; the upward 5m climbs are counted cumulatively. The World Record of 27.8m/5.5 upward climbs (91 ft 2 in) was set by Marcus Bondi on 31/1/10 in the TV studio of "Australia Smashes Guinness World Records" verified by Official Guinness supervision.
- Rope climbing on 50 meter rope – 165.68 seconds world record set in Johannesburg, South Africa by Thomas Butler Van Tonder from Johannesburg, South Africa
- Rope climbing on 14 meter rope – 10.06 seconds world record set in Nové Město nad Metují, Czech Republic (2025) by Matěj Cigl from Brno, Czech Republic
- Rope climbing on 8 meter rope – 4.44 seconds world record in Pardubice, Czech Republic (2026) by Matěj Cigl from Brno, Czech Republic

== See also ==
- Aerial silk
- Gymnastics
- Rope climbing at the Olympics
