= Gymnastics at the 1932 Summer Olympics – Men's rope climbing =

Men's rope climbing at the Games of the X Olympiad
- Artistic gymnastics pictogram
- Venue: Los Angeles Memorial Coliseum
- Date: August 10, 1932
- Competitors: 5 from 2 nations
- Winning time: 6.7

Medalists
1st place, gold medalist(s)		Raymond Bass; United States
2nd place, silver medalist(s)		William Galbraith; United States
3rd place, bronze medalist(s)		Thomas F. Connolly; United States

The men's rope climbing event was part of the gymnastics programme at the 1932 Summer Olympics. It was contested for the fourth and last time after 1896, 1904, and 1924. The competition was held on Wednesday, August 10, 1932. Five gymnasts from two nations competed. All three medalists were from the host nation, as Americans Raymond Bass, William Galbraith, and Thomas F. Connolly took the honors (in that order).

== Background ==
This was the fourth and final appearance of the event, which had been held in 1896, 1904, and 1924. The event was an unusual one, not one of the standard apparatus competitions held at the world championships. It had been left off the programme in 1928 when other apparatus events were held (no specific apparatus events were held in 1900, 1908, 1912, or 1920). It was more commonly seen in the United States (hosting the 1932 Games) than internationally; the two competitors from Hungary (the only international gymnasts) were unfamiliar with the event.

The United States made its third appearance in the event (1904 and 1924), while Hungary made its debut.

== Competition format ==
The rope climbing event was judged on time, with the fastest to reach the top winning. As in 1904, each competitor received three attempts. The rope this time was 8 metres high (rather than the 25 feet of 1904). None of the apparatus events in 1932 were aggregated into the individual or team all-around scores, instead being entirely separate competitions.

== Schedule ==
Date	Time	Round
Wednesday, 10 August 1932	8:00	Final

== Results ==
Every competitor had the possibility of three trials with the results based on the best time; the Hungarians did not make any attempts after the first, seeing their times in the first round so much slower than the Americans.

All figures in seconds.

Rank	Gymnast	Nation	1st trial	2nd trial	3rd trial	Best time
1st place, gold medalist(s)	Raymond Bass	United States	6.7	6.8	6.9	6.7
2nd place, silver medalist(s)	William Galbraith	United States	7.0	6.8	7.0	6.8
3rd place, bronze medalist(s)	Thomas F. Connolly	United States	7.1	7.0	7.2	7.0
4	Miklós Péter	Hungary	11.5	—	—	11.5
5	Péter Boros	Hungary	11.6	—	—	11.6
