= William Galbraith (gymnast) =

American gymnast (1906–1994)

- Full name: William Jackson Galbraith
- Born: September 15, 1906 Knoxville, Tennessee, U.S.
- Died: August 8, 1994 (aged 87) Williamsburg, Virginia, U.S.

Gymnastics career
- Discipline: Men's artistic gymnastics
- Country represented: United States
Medal record
Men's artistic gymnastics
Representing United States
Event	1st	2nd	3rd
Olympic Games	0	1	0
Total	0	1	0
Olympic Games
Silver medal – second place	1932 Los Angeles	Rope Climbing
- Military career
- Allegiance: United States
- Branch: United States Navy
- Service years: 1929–1959
- Rank: Rear Admiral
- Conflicts: World War II
- Awards: Silver Star; Bronze Star Medal; Purple Heart; Presidential Unit Citation

William Jackson "Jack" Galbraith (September 15, 1906 – August 9, 1994) was a gymnast and Olympic medalist in the 1932 Summer Olympics. He was a member of the United States men's national artistic gymnastics team and competed at the 1932 Summer Olympics in Los Angeles where he won a silver medal in rope climbing. He served as a Rear Admiral in the United States Navy from 1929 through 1959 and was awarded a Silver Star, Bronze Star Medal, Purple Heart, and Presidential Unit Citation.
