= Chris A. Butler =

American set decorator (1952–1994)

- Born: August 14, 1952; Tennessee, United States
- Died: April 30, 1994 (aged 41); Los Angeles, California, United States
- Occupation: Set decorator
- Years active: 1978-1994

Chris A. Butler (August 14, 1952 – April 30, 1994) was an American set decorator. He was nominated for an Academy Award in the category Best Art Direction for the film Chaplin. He died at his home in Los Angeles, from complications of AIDS.

== Selected filmography ==
- Chaplin (1992)
