= List of Burundian politicians =

The following is a list of Burundian politicians, both past and present since independence in 1962.

== B ==
- Bagaza, Jean-Baptiste
- Bamina, Joseph
- Bamvuginyumvira, Frédéric
- Barancira, Alphonse
- Bararunyeretse, Libère
- Bayaganakandi, Epitace
- Bigirimana, Balthazar
- Biha, Léopold
- Buyoya, Pierre
- Bwakira, Melchior

== C ==
- Cimpaye, Joseph

== H ==
- Hitimana, Mathias

== K ==
- Kabushemeye, Ernest
- Kagayo, Jeanne d'Arc
- Kamatari, Esther
- Kamatari, Godefroid
- Kadege, Alphonse-Marie
- Kanyenkiko, Anatole
- Kinigi, Sylvie

== M ==
- Manwangari, Jean-Baptiste
- Masumbuko, André
- Micombero, Michel
- Minani, Jean
- Muhirwa, André
- Mwambutsa IV Bangiricenge
- Mworoha, Emile

== N ==
- Nahayo, Immaculée
- Ndadaye, Melchior
- Ndayikengurukiye, Jean-Bosco
- Ndayizeye, Domitien
- Ndimira, Pascal-Firmin
- Ndizeye, Charles (Ntare V Ndizeye)
- Nduwayo, Antoine
- Nduwimana, Martin
- Ngendandumwe, Pierre
- Ngenzebuhoro, Frédéric
- Ngeze, François
- Nkurunziza, Pierre
- Ntahokaja, Nick-Bertrand
- Ndayizeye, Domitien
- Jean Marie Vianney Kara Ndayambaje
- Ntaryamira, Cyprien
- Ntibantunganya, Sylvestre
- Nyamoya, Albin
- Nyangoma, Léonard
- Nzambimana, Édouard
- Nzeyimana, Joseph
- Nzojibwami, Augustin
- Nzomukunda, Alice

== R ==
- Rufyikiri, Gervais
- Rugambarara, Alphonse
- Rwagasore, Louis

== S ==
- Sendegeya, Pierre-Claver
- Sibomana, Adrien
- Sinamenye, Mathias
