= List of Hutus =

This is a list of famous Hutus who have Wikipedia biographies which include mention of Hutu identity.

== Africans other than Rwandans ==
=== Congolese politician ===
- Eugène Serufuli Ngayabaseka, Congolese politician.

=== Presidents of Burundi ===
- Melchior Ndadaye, 4th president of Burundi and hero of democracy
- Cyprien Ntaryamira, 5th president of Burundi assassinated with Juvénal Habyarimana of Rwanda
- Sylvestre Ntibantunganya, 6th president of Burundi
- Domitien Ndayizeye, 8th president of Burundi
- Pierre Nkurunziza, 9th president of Burundi (2005-2020)
- Évariste Ndayishimiye, president of Burundi since 2020

=== Vice-Presidents of Burundi ===
- Frédéric Bamvuginyumvira, First Vice-President of Burundi from 11 June 1998 to 1 November 2001.
- Gabriel Ntisezerana , Second Vice President of Burundi (2007-2010), Governor of the Bank of the Republic of Burundi (2006-2007) and East African Legislative Assembly member (2022-2027)
- Gervais Rufyikiri, Second Vice President of Burundi from 2010 to 2015.
- Joseph Butore, second vice president of Burundi (2015-2020) and secretary general of the national insurance regulation agency (since 2020)

=== Prime Ministers of Burundi ===
- Pierre Ngendandumwe, prime minister of Burundi (1963-1964 & 7 January 1965 -15 January 1965) assassinated in 1965
- Joseph Bamina, prime minister of Burundi (January 1965 - September 1965) assasinated in 1965
- Adrien Sibomana, prime minister of Burundi (1998-1993).
- Alain Guillaume Bunyoni, former prime minister of Burundi (2020-2022)
- Gervais Ndirakobuca, former prime minister (2022-2025) of Burundi and president of Senate (since 2025)
- Nestor Ntahontuye, prime minister of Burundi (since 2025)

=== Burundian Members of Parliament ===
- Paul Mirerekano, first vice president of the National Assembly of Burundi (July 1965-October 1965) assassinated in 1965

=== Burundian politicians ===
- Agathon Rwasa, Burundian politician and military leader.
- Hussein Radjabu, Burundian politician and former secretary general of CNDD-FDD
- Ernest Kabushemeye, minister for Mines and Energy department, assassinated in 1995

=== Burundian diplomats ===
- Ezechiel Nibigira, president of the Commission of ECCAS and former foreign minister of Burundi (2018-2020)
- Albert Shingiro, former permanent representative to the United Nations (2014-2020) and former foreign minister of Burundi (2020-2025)
- Edouard Bizimana, former ambassador to Germany (2012-2016) and Russia (2016-2020), minister of foreign affairs (since 2025)

=== Burundian military and police officers ===
- Comdt. Martin Ndayahoze, military officer and government official who served variously as Minister of Information, Minister of Economy, and Deputy Chief of Staff of the Burundian National Army. Murdered in 1972
- Lt. Gen. Adolphe Nshimirimana, military general and former army chief of staff

== Rwandans ==
- Pasteur Bizimungu, President of Rwanda.
- Agathe Habyarimana, first lady of Rwanda (born 1953)
- Juvenal Habyarimana, President of Rwanda.
- Joseph Kavaruganda, Rwandan judge.
- Jacqueline Mukansonera, Rwandan human rights activist.

=== People convicted in connection with genocide ===
- Théoneste Bagosora, Rwandan military officer, convicted in connection with Rwandan genocide.
- Simon Bikindi, Rwandan singer-songwriter, convicted in connection with Rwandan genocide.
- Froduald Karamira, Rwandan politician, convicted in connection with Rwandan genocide.
- Hassan Ngeze, Rwandan journalist, convicted in connection with Rwandan genocide.
