= 2015 in Burundi =

- Decades: 1990s; 2000s; 2010s; 2020s
- See also: Other events of 2015; List of years in Burundi

This article lists events from the year 2015 in the Republic of Burundi.

== Incumbents ==
- President: Pierre Nkurunziza
- First Vice President - Prosper Bazombanza (until August 20); Gaston Sindimwo (from August 20)
- Second Vice President - Gervais Rufyikiri (until August 20); Joseph Butore (from August 20)

== Events ==
=== April ===
- April 26 - The start of the 2015 Burundian unrest. Two protestors die.
- April 27 - 2015 Burundian unrest
  - More opposition activists protest on the second day for a protest against a proposal for President Pierre Nkurunziza to run a third term in office.

=== May ===
- May 2 - A grenade attack on the capital, Bujumbura, kills two policeman and one civilian and injures three others.
- May 8 - 2015 Burundian unrest
  - Protests increase when President Nkurunziza officially registers to run for a third term in office.
- May 23 - Zedi Feruzi a politician and the head of the Union for Peace and Development shot dead outside his home.

August

- August 2 - Adolphe Nshimirimana was a former army chief of staff and intelligence chief killed in his car with his Bodyguards by rockets and gunshots.
- August 3 - Pierre Claver Mbonima a human right activist was shot in the face and neck in Bujumbura, after facing numerous death threats and fled to Belgium for urgent medical care. On 9 October 2015, unidentified armed persons killed his son in law Pascal Nshimirimana, a month later the son of Pierre, Welly Nzitonda was arrested and later found dead on a roadside.
- August 15 - Jean Bikomagu a former army chief assassinated by unknown gunmen outside his home in the capital Bujumbura and his daughter was severely injured.

== Links ==
Media related to 2015 in Burundi at Wikimedia Commons
