= 2020 in Burundi =

- Decades: 2000s; 2010s; 2020s
- See also: Other events of 2020; List of years in Burundi

== Incumbents ==
- President: Pierre Nkurunziza (until June 8), Evariste Ndayishimiye (since June 8)

== Events ==
=== January ===
- January 13 - China promises to strengthen ties to Burundi.
- 31 January: Four journalists are sentenced to 30-month jail sentences in Burundi.

=== February ===
- February 5 - Unity Day, Burundi
- 15 February – Six mass graves with 6,000 bodies are found in Karuzi Province, Burundi.

=== April ===
- April 1 - 1st case of the COVID-19 pandemic in Burundi
- April 2 - 2nd case
- April 6 - Cyprien Ntaryamira Day, Burundi

=== May ===
- May 14 – Four members of the World Health Organization are expelled from Burundi.
- May 20 - 2020 Burundian general election

=== June ===
- June 8 - Pierre Nkurunziza, the president of Burundi, dies of a stroke.

=== July to December ===
- December 29 – Former president Pierre Buyoya is buried in Bamako, Mali.

== Deaths ==
- May 8 – Therence Sinunguruza, 60, Burundian politician, MP (2005–2010), Permanent Representative to the UN (1993–1994) and Vice-President (2010–2013)
- June 8 – Pierre Nkurunziza, 55, Burundian politician and the ninth president of Burundi (2005–2020); Coronavirus disease 2019.
- December 17 – Pierre Buyoya, 71, politician, President of Burundi (1987–1993, 1996–2003); COVID-19.

== See also ==
- 2020 in East Africa
- COVID-19 pandemic in Burundi
- COVID-19 pandemic in Africa
