= 2022 in Burundi =

- Decades: 2000s; 2010s; 2020s
- See also: Other events of 2022; List of years in Burundi

Events in the year 2022 in Burundi.

== Incumbents ==
- President: Évariste Ndayishimiye
- Prime Minister: Alain-Guillaume Bunyoni (until 7 September); Gervais Ndirakobuca onwards
- Vice President: Prosper Bazombanza

== Events ==
Ongoing — COVID-19 pandemic in Burundi

- 14 March — Police suspend a joint press conference organized by anti-corruption groups OLUCOME and PARCEM, citing lack of permission.
- 3 May — At least 30 Burundian peacekeepers are killed and 20 more injured during an al-Shabaab attack at an African Union military base in Lower Shabelle, Somalia.
- 22 June — The National Assembly enacts a law creating a new reserve force within Burundi’s national defense forces.
- 7 September — Gervais Ndirakobuca becomes the new prime minister of Burundi, following unanimous approval by the National Assembly.

== Deaths ==
- 23 July – Venant Bacinoni, 82, Roman Catholic prelate.
