= 2006 in Burundi =

- Decades: 1980s; 1990s; 2000s; 2010s; 2020s
- See also: Other events of 2006; List of years in Burundi

The following lists events that happened during 2006 in Burundi.

== Events ==
=== January ===
- 27 January - The UN Security Council adopts Resolution 1653 on peace and stability in the Great Lakes region, including Burundi.

=== April ===
- A curfew originally imposed during the 1972 mass killings of Hutus is lifted after over 3 decades.

=== June ===
- 18 June - The Government of Burundi and Forces nationales de liberation sign the Agreement on Principles towards Lasting Peace, Security and Stability.

=== July ===
- Around 30 people disappear in Muyinga province after arrest and interrogation by soldiers and National Intelligence Service agents.
- A series of politically motivated grenade attacks kill 13 and wound 122 people.

=== August ===
- 30 August - The Burundi government accuses acting Special Representative Nureldin Satti and requests his removal from office.
- Gabriel Rufyiri, head of the anti-corruption group OLUCOME, is imprisoned on libel charges after denouncing government corruption.
- Former Vice President Alphonse Marie Kadege and two other opposition politicians file complaints alleging torture by the National Intelligence Service.

=== September ===
- 7 September - The Government of Burundi and Forces nationales de liberation sign the Dar-es-Salaam Comprehensive Ceasefire Agreement.
- Second Vice President Alice Nzomukunda resigns, citing government human rights abuses and corruption.
- The National Liberation Forces sign a ceasefire agreement with the government, though disarmament and demobilization deadlines are missed.

=== October ===
- 25 October - The UN Security Council adopts resolution 1719, establishing the UN Integrated Office in Burundi (BINUB) and its mandate.

=== December ===
- 22 December - United Nations Secretary General Kofi Annan warns of "troubling developments" in Burundi that could lead to violence.
- 31 December - The United Nations Operation in Burundi (ONUB) ends its mission, including its human rights section, and is replaced by the Integrated Office of the United Nations for Burundi (BINUB).
