= 2017 in Burundi =

- Decades: 1990s; 2000s; 2010s; 2020s
- See also: Other events of 2017; List of years in Burundi

This article lists events from the year 2017 in Burundi.

== Incumbents ==
- President: Pierre Nkurunziza
- First Vice President - Gaston Sindimwo
- Second Vice President - Joseph Butore

== Events ==
- 1 January - Environmental minister, Emmanuel Niyonkuru, is gunned down in Bujumbura.

== Deaths ==
- 1 January – Emmanuel Niyonkuru, politician, assassinated (b. 1962).

== Links ==
Media related to 2017 in Burundi at Wikimedia Commons
