= Permanent Representative of Burundi to the United Nations in New York =

Coordinates: 40.750861°N 73.969158°W

Permanent Representative of Burundi to the Headquarters of the United Nations
- Coat of arms of Burundi
- Incumbent; Zéphirin Maniratanga since April 26, 2021
- Residence: 336 East 45th street 12 floor, New York, NY 10017
- Appointer: Évariste Ndayishimiye
- Inaugural holder: Pascal Bubiriza
- Formation: September 18, 1962
- Website: https://ambabunewyork.mae.gov.bi/

The Burundian Permanent Representative to the United Nations in New York is the official representative of the Government of Burundi to the Headquarters of the United Nations.

== List of representatives ==
Diplomatic accreditation	Permanent Representative	Observations	List of presidents of Burundi	List of secretaries-general of the United Nations	Term end
September 18, 1962		Burundi joined the United Nations.	Mwambutsa IV Bangiricenge of Burundi	U Thant	
September 18, 1962	Pascal Bubiriza		Mwambutsa IV Bangiricenge of Burundi	U Thant	
October 24, 1963	Gervais Nyangoma		Mwambutsa IV Bangiricenge of Burundi	U Thant	
April 12, 1965	André Nyankiye		Mwambutsa IV Bangiricenge of Burundi	U Thant	
April 5, 1966	Térence Nsanzé		Michel Micombero	U Thant	
April 18, 1973	Joseph Ndabaniwe		Michel Micombero	Kurt Waldheim	
June 1976	Patrice Abraham Haruna Mikanagu		Jean-Baptiste Bagaza	Kurt Waldheim	
January 17, 1977	Artémon Simbananiye		Jean-Baptiste Bagaza	Kurt Waldheim	
September 25, 1981	Melchior Bwakira		Jean-Baptiste Bagaza	Kurt Waldheim	
January 8, 1987	Jonathas Niyungeko		Pierre Buyoya	Javier Pérez de Cuéllar	
September 28, 1989	Benoit Seburyamo		Pierre Buyoya	Javier Pérez de Cuéllar	
1993	Therence Sinunguruza		Cyprien Ntaryamira	Boutros Boutros-Ghali	1994
February 1, 1995	Tharcisse Ntakibirora		Sylvestre Ntibantunganya	Boutros Boutros-Ghali	
July 17, 1997	Gamaliel Ndaruzaniye	Nzeyimana Caritas Ndaruzaniye	Pierre Buyoya	Kofi Annan	
October 5, 1999	Marc Nteturuye		Pierre Buyoya	Kofi Annan	
May 1, 2006	Joseph Ntakirutimana		Pierre Nkurunziza	Kofi Annan	
May 7, 2008	Augustin Nsanze		Pierre Nkurunziza	Ban Ki-moon	
2006	Albert Shingiro	Chargé d'affaires	Pierre Nkurunziza	Kofi Annan	2006
July 17, 2009	Zacharie Gahutu		Pierre Nkurunziza	Ban Ki-moon	
October 2011	Hermenegilde Niyonzima		Pierre Nkurunziza	Ban Ki-moon	
September 4, 2014	Albert Shingiro		Pierre Nkurunziza	Ban Ki-moon	2020
April 26, 2021	Zéphyrin Maniratanga		Évariste Ndayishimiye	António Guterres	

== See also ==
- List of current permanent representatives to the United Nations
- United Nations Operation in Burundi
