= 2027 in Burundi =

- Decades: 2000s; 2010s; 2020s
- See also: Other events of 2027; List of years in Burundi

Events in the year 2027 in Burundi.

== Events ==
- TBA – 2027 Burundian presidential election

== Holidays ==
- 1 January – New Year's Day
- 5 February – Unity Day
- 6 April – Cyprien Ntaryamira Day
- 1 May – Labour Day
- 6 May – Ascension Day
- 16 May – Eid al-Adha
- 1 July – Independence Day
- 15 August – Assumption
- 13 October – Rwagasore Day
- 21 October – Ndadaye Day
- 1 November – All Saints' Day
- 25 December – Christmas Day
