= Thaddée =

Thaddée is a masculine given name. Notable people with this name include:

- Thaddée Ndikumana, Burundian politician
- Thaddée Nsengiyumva (1949–1994), Rwandan bishop
- Thaddée Ntihinyurwa (born 1942), Rwandan prelate
- Thaddée Siryuyumunsi (fl. 1960s), Burundian politician

== See also ==
- Thaddeus
