= 2019 in Burundi =

- Decades: 1990s; 2000s; 2010s; 2020s
- See also: Other events of 2019; List of years in Burundi

== Incumbents ==
- President: Pierre Nkurunziza

== Events ==
- August 19 – 31: Burundi at the 2019 African Games
- December 5 – 41 people die, and 40 others are injured during a series of landslides in Cibitoke, Bujumbura, Bubanza, and Cankuzo

== Deaths ==
- 25 April – Faty Papy, 28, footballer (MVV Maastricht, Bidvest Wits, national team)
