= 1983 in Burundi =

- Decades: 1960s; 1970s; 1980s; 1990s; 2000s
- See also: Other events of 1983; List of years in Burundi

The following lists events that happened during 1983 in Burundi.

== Incumbents ==
- President: Jean-Baptiste Bagaza
- Prime Minister: Post abolished (13 October 1978 – 19 October 1988)

== Births ==
- 18 May - Christian Nduwimana, Burundian football player

== Deaths ==
- 16 July - Michel Micombero, Burundian military officer and statesman, 8th Prime Minister and 1st President of Burundi (b. 1940)

== See also ==
- History of Burundi
