= 2026 in Burundi =

- Decades: 2000s; 2010s; 2020s
- See also: Other events of 2026; List of years in Burundi

Events in the year 2026 in Burundi.

== Incumbents ==
- President: Évariste Ndayishimiye
- Prime Minister: Gervais Ndirakobuca

== Events ==
=== January ===
- 2 January – Japan sends $625,000 of food aid to Burundi.
- 5 January – Eight people are accused of spying for the M23 rebels in the Democratic Republic of Congo.
- 6 January –
  - A major national scandal is exposed involving billions of francs in misappropriated fertilizer funds.
  - A 70-year-old man is murdered in Bubanza.
- 9 January – At least 25 Congolese refugees are reported to have died in a cholera outbreak in Burundi.

=== February ===
- 23 February – The Kavimvira border crossing between the DRC and Burundi reopens following a two-month closure caused by M23 offensives.
- 26 February – Italian authorities arrest Burundian national Guillaume Harushimana in Parma, in connection with the 2014 murders of three Italian missionary nuns in Bujumbura.

=== March ===
- 11 March – Former prime minister Alain-Guillaume Bunyoni, who had been sentenced to life imprisonment in 2023 for conspiring against president Ndayishimiye, is granted provisional release from a hospital in Gitega on medical grounds.
- 30 March – An outbreak of an unknown disease is first reported in Mpanda district. Five deaths and 35 other cases are reported.
- 31 March – At least 13 people are killed and 57 are injured after explosions at a military ammunition depot in Bujumbura, reportedly caused by an electrical short circuit.

=== July ===
- 19 July – Eight people are killed and nine others injured in a crowd crush at the Senior Technical School of Kamenge in Bujumbura after a wall at an exit gate collapses.

=== September ===
- 30 September – Burundi agrees to accept third country deportees from the United States, who have not been accused of crimes or having terrorist links.

== Holidays ==
- 1 January – New Year's Day
- 5 February – Unity Day
- 6 April – Cyprien Ntaryamira Day
- 1 May – Labour Day
- 9 May – Ascension Day
- 6 June – Eid al-Adha
- 1 July – Independence Day
- 15 August – Assumption
- 13 October – Rwagasore Day
- 21 October – Ndadaye Day
- 1 November – All Saints' Day
- 25 December – Christmas Day

== Deaths ==
- 26 July – Pié Masumbuko, 94, acting prime minister (1965)
