= Denise Bucumi-Nkurunziza =

Burundian ordained minister who was First Lady of Burundi from 2005 to 2020

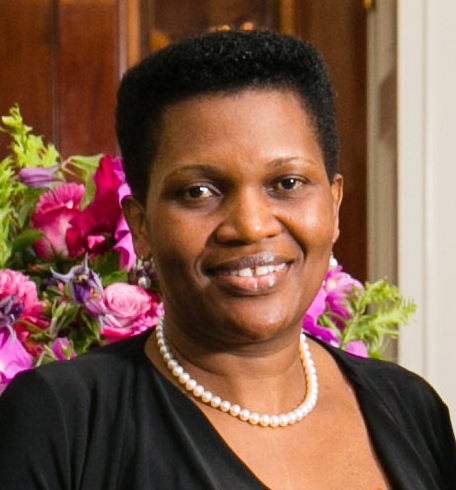
- Nkurunziza in 2014

First Lady of Burundi
- In office 26 August 2005 – 8 June 2020
- President: Pierre Nkurunziza
- Succeeded by: Angeline Ndayishimiye

Personal details
- Born: Denise Bucumi; 1 December 1969 (age 56) Gatsinda, Mwumba, Ngozi Province, Burundi
- Party: National Council for the Defense of Democracy
- Spouse: Pierre Nkurunziza (m. 1994; died 2020)
- Children: 6

Denise Bucumi-Nkurunziza (born 1 December 1969) is a Burundian ordained minister who was First Lady of Burundi from 2005 to 2020 as the wife of Pierre Nkurunziza. She is the only ordained minister who has served as a first lady of any African nation.

== Life ==
Bucumi-Nkurunziza was born in Gatsinda, Mwumba in Ngozi Province on 1 December 1969. She married Pierre Nkurunziza in 1994 shortly before Nkurunziza was forced to go into hiding in the early stages of the Burundian Civil War. He joined the rebel National Council for the Defense of Democracy – Forces for the Defense of Democracy (Conseil National Pour la Défense de la Démocratie – Forces pour la Défense de la Démocratie, CNDD–FDD) and rose though its ranks. A series of agreements in 2003 paved the way for the CNDD–FDD to be reintegrated into politics. Bucumi-Nkurunziza was reunited with her husband after several years of separation.

Both Bucumi-Nkurunziza and her husband were born-again Christians and Evangelical Protestants. Bucumi-Nkurunziza became an ordained minister and was involved in charitable activities under her foundation Buntu as First Lady. She authored an autobiography, published with L'Harmattan. The couple had six children.

On the morning of 28 May 2020, she was airlifted to Nairobi, Kenya to be treated for COVID-19 during the COVID-19 pandemic in Burundi at Aga Khan University Hospital. Her husband died on 8 June 2020 in Karuzi. Although the cause of death was stated to be a heart attack, it was widely suspected that he had died of COVID-19.

She was succeeded by Angeline Ndayishimiye.

== Authography ==
- The Power of Hope: The First Lady of Burundi. My Story (Paris: L'Harmattan, 2013).
