= Pie Ntavyohanyuma =

Burundian politician

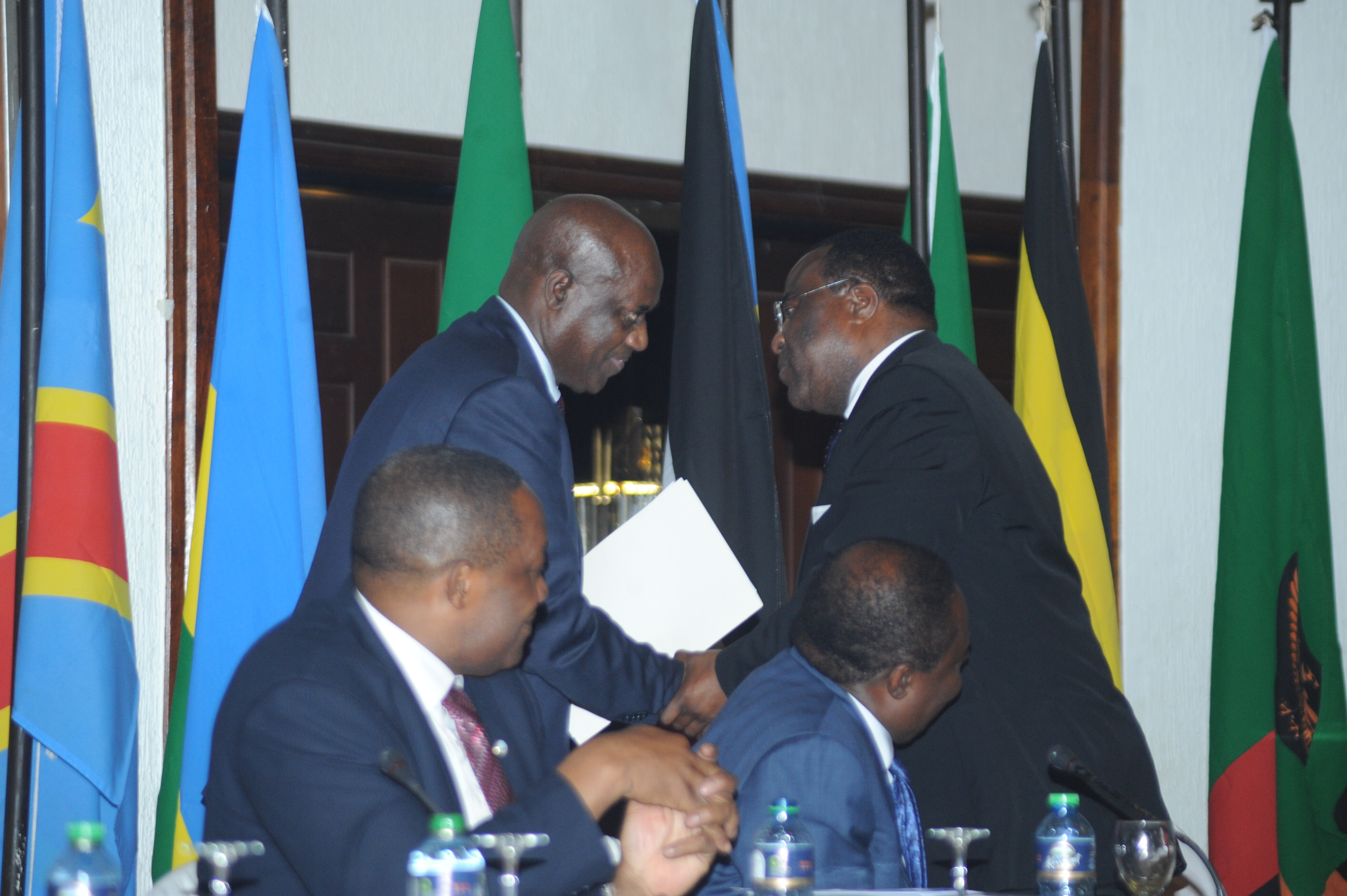
- Ntavyohanyuma (left) at a Great Lakes parliamentary forum in 2015

President of the National Assembly of Burundi
- In office March 16, 2007 – June 28, 2015
- Preceded by: Immaculée Nahayo
- Succeeded by: Pascal Nyabenda

Personal details
- Born: Burundi

Pie Ntavyohanyuma is a Burundian politician who was head of the National Assembly from 2007 to 2015. He resigned and fled to Brussels, Belgium on June 28, 2015 during the 2015–2018 Burundian unrest, citing the unrest and his opposition to president Pierre Nkurunziza's bid for a disputed third term in the 2015 Burundian presidential election. He told France 24 that he "personally advised President Nkurunziza to drop his plan for a third term, but his answer was to threaten me, to humiliate me."
