= 2023 in Burundi =

- Decades: 2000s; 2010s; 2020s
- See also: Other events of 2023; List of years in Burundi

Events in the year 2023 in Burundi.

== Incumbents ==
- President: Évariste Ndayishimiye
- Prime Minister: Gervais Ndirakobuca

== Events ==
- COVID-19 pandemic in Burundi – In the year 2023 there was a decline in the total reported cases of COVID-19 than the years before when registered cases peaked. There were just shy of 3000 cases of COVID-19 reported during the entire year, bringing the total number of cases to 54,721. There were no recorded deaths due to the virus in 2023.
- The GDP rose by 2,7% in 2023, compared to 1,8% from the year before. The Burundian economy is slowly recovering from the COVID-19 pandemic.
- 25 January – Kirundi becomes an official language.
- 2 April – Fifteen people are killed after two coal pits are flooded in Cibitoke.
- 17 July – The International Monetary Fund (IMF) approved a 38-month arrangement of about US$ 261.7 million under the Extended Credit Facility.
- 25-29 September & 2-4 October – A team from the IMF under the leadership of the Mission Chief for Burundi, Ms. Mame Astou Diouf, visited Bujumbura to discuss developments under this new arrangement.
- September – The UN's International Organization for Migration (IOM) visited Burundi to record the progress of a project instituted to build climate resilience in a country that is among the most vulnerable to climate change. The IOM reported 90 communes and 17 provinces that have tested contingency plans newly elaborated or updated in place; a further 133 Communcal Committees for Disaster Risk Reduction (in teams of 13) were trained and equipped to provide relief in the 50 most vulnerable communes, as well as do disaster prevention work and other small-scale activities.
- 22 December – Twenty people are killed, mostly civilians, and nine others are injured in an attack by the RED-Tabara rebel group in Vugizo, Makamba.
