= List of presidents of the National Assembly of Burundi =

List of presidents of the National Assembly of Burundi. The president is the presiding officer in the National Assembly of Burundi.

This is a list of presidents (speakers) of the Constituent Assembly of Burundi:

Name	Took office	Left office	Notes
Thaddée Siryuyumunsi	28 September 1961	1962	

This is a list of presidents (speakers) of the National Assembly of Burundi:

Name	Took office	Left office	Notes
Thaddée Siryuyumunsi	July 1, 1962	1965	
Emile Bucumi	1965	1965	
No Legislative Arm of Government	1965	1982	
Emile Mworoha	1982	3 September 1987	
No Legislative Arm of Government	1987	1993	
Pontien Karibwami	July 1993	21 October 1993	
Sylvestre Ntibantunganya	23 December 1993	1 October 1994	
Jean Minani	1 December 1994	January 1995	
Léonce Ngendakumana	12 January 1995	25 July 1996	
No Legislative Arm of Government	1996	1998	
Léonce Ngendakumana	18 July 1998	2002	
Jean Minani	10 January 2002	August 2005	
Immaculée Nahayo	16 August 2005	16 March 2007	
Pie Ntavyohanyuma	16 March 2007	June 2015	
Pascal Nyabenda	30 July 2015	7 August 2020	
Gélase Daniel Ndabirabe	7 August 2020	Present	

== See also ==
- List of presidents of the Senate of Burundi
