= COVID-19 vaccination in Burundi =

Plan to immunize against COVID-19

- Date: October 18, 2021 - present
- Location: Burundi
- Cause: COVID-19 pandemic

COVID-19 vaccination in Burundi is an ongoing immunisation campaign against severe acute respiratory syndrome coronavirus 2 (SARS-CoV-2), the virus that causes coronavirus disease 2019 (COVID-19), in response to the ongoing pandemic in the country. Burundi was one of the last nation states in the world to commence vaccination against COVID-19. This was mostly due to the government's refusal to vaccinate the population throughout most of 2021. In February 2021, Thaddee Ndikumana, the health minister of Burundi, said his country was more concerned with prevention measures. "Since more than 95% of patients are recovering, we estimate that the vaccines are not yet necessary," local media reported.

In October 2021, however, the Burundian government announced that it had received delivery of 500,000 doses of the Chinese Sinopharm BIBP vaccine, and announced that it would begin inoculation. Targeted vaccinations subsequently started on 18 October 2021.

== History ==
=== Timeline ===
==== October 2021 ====
Burundi received a Chinese donation of 500,000 doses of the Sinopharm BIBP vaccine on 14 October and launched a targeted vaccination programme on 18 October 2021. By the end of the month 560 vaccine doses had been administered.

==== November 2021 ====
By the end of the month 1592 vaccine doses had been administered and 778 persons were fully vaccinated.

==== December 2021 ====
By the end of the month 6421 vaccine doses had been administered and 4453 persons were fully vaccinated (less than 0.1% of the targeted population).

==== January 2022 ====
By the end of the month 8400 vaccine doses had been administered and 6016 persons were fully vaccinated (less than 0.2% of the targeted population).

==== February 2022 ====
By the end of the month 11502 vaccine doses had been administered and 9181 persons were fully vaccinated.

==== March 2022 ====
By the end of the month 12464 vaccine doses had been administered and 9906 persons were fully vaccinated.

== Progress ==
Cumulative vaccinations in Burundi
