= 2021 in Burundi =

- Decades: 2000s; 2010s; 2020s
- See also: Other events of 2021; List of years in Burundi

Events in the year 2021 in Burundi.

== Incumbents ==
- President: Évariste Ndayishimiye
- Prime Minister: Alain-Guillaume Bunyoni

== Events ==
Ongoing — COVID-19 pandemic in Burundi

- 4 February – Burundi Airlines is established.

== Deaths ==
- 19 February – Clotilde Niragira, politician and lawyer, Minister of Justice (born 1968).
- 6 March – Nicolas Bwakira, 79, diplomat. (death announced on this date)
