= Nahayo =

Nahayo is a surname. Notable people with the surname include:

- Immaculée Nahayo (1948–2018), Burundian politician
- Valery Nahayo (born 1984), Burundian footballer
