= Léonce Ngendakumana =

President of the National Assembly of Burundi
- In office 12 January 1995 – 25 July 1996
- Preceded by: Jean Minani
- Succeeded by: Disbanded
- In office 18 July 1998 – January 2002
- Preceded by: Disbanded
- Succeeded by: Jean Minani

Personal details
- Party: Front for Democracy in Burundi

Léonce Ngendakumana is a Burundian politician who was President of the National Assembly of Burundi from 1995–1996, and again from 1998–2002. He was born in 1954 in the province of Bujumbura, to a modest family. He launched his political career at a young age when he became politically active in the BAMPERE party, until the creation of the Burundi Workers' Party (UBU).

He was one of the founders of the Front for Democracy in Burundi (FRODÉBU), and in 2006, he became its secretary-general.

In February 2014, Ngendakumana sent a letter to the UN Secretary-General in his capacity as head of the ADC-Ikibiri coalition. He urged the international community to assist against Burundi's ruling party's incitement of violence. He was subsequently sentenced to one year in prison "for incitement to racial hatred and making damaging allegations and false accusations" in October.

== Electoral Mandates ==
He was elected to represent Bujumbura in the National Assembly. In 1995, he became President of the Assembly, holding that post until 2002. He was re-elected as deputy in the 2005 elections but his party, FRODÉBU, failed to gain control of the Assembly.
