= Thaddée Siryuyumunsi =

Burundian politician

Thaddée Siryuyumunsi was a Burundian politician who served as President of the National Assembly from 1961 to 1965.

== Early life ==
Ethnically, Siryuyumunsi was Tutsi-Hima. He was educated at the Groupe Scolaire de Astrida. He subsequently worked for the Belgian Residency of Urundi, served as the private secretary of Mwami Mwambutsa IV, and headed the Nyabikere chiefdom.

== Political career ==
Siryuyumunsi became an active supporter of Louis Rwagasore and his political party, the Union for National Progress (Union pour le Progrès national, UPRONA). On 18 September 1961 national elections were held in Burundi to determine the composition of the new Legislative Assembly. UPRONA secured an overwhelming majority, and Siryuyumunsi was elected to a seat from the Karuzi constituency. On 28 September Siryuyumunsi was elected President of the Legislative Assembly. During his parliamentary tenure he remained closely affiliated to the Mwami.

On 13 October 1961 Prime Minister Rwagasore was assassinated in a plot conceived by members of an opposition party. His death stoked divisions in UPRONA, and fueled a rivalry between Hutu politician Paul Mirerekano and the new Ganwa prime minister, André Muhirwa. Both claimed to be the heirs to the late prime minister's legacy and both sought to become president of UPRONA in his wake. The controversy led to the coalescing of two factions in the party, with Muhirwa leading the Tutsi-dominated "Casablanca group" and Mirekano leading the Hutu-led "Monrovia group". The former was generally anti-West in its political orientation, while the latter took a more moderate stance on the West. Despite being a Tutsi, Siryuyumunsi led the Monrovia faction in the Assembly. At Mwami Mwambutsa's intervention, an UPRONA mass congress was held in September 1962 to resolve the leadership dispute, which led to both Mirerekano, Muhirwa, and Siryuyumunsi being assigned vice presidencies in the party.

On 23 March 1963 Muhirwa ordered Siryuyumunsi and two other Monrovia leaders arrested. Mwambutsa intervened and secured his release on 5 May. The Assembly had been out of session at the time, and when it reconvened on 14 May, its members intensively debated the election of a presiding officer. Siryuyumunsi was reelected as its president two days later, earning 33 out of 64 votes. The body appointed him to the Mwami's Crown Council on 22 May. He actively encouraged Burundi to recognize Communist China, and the following year he led a three-person parliamentary delegation to there and the Soviet Union. Meanwhile, Mwambutsa increasingly involved himself in national politics. Over the course of late 1963 and early 1964 he consolidated power in the crown and away from the parliamentary government. Siryuyumunsi joined the other members of the Assembly bureau in protesting perceived constitutional violations by the monarchy in February and March.

In January 1965 Prime Minister Pierre Ngendandumwe was murdered. His death created a political crisis, so the Mwami scheduled new elections for the National Assembly. By then, Hutu political consciousness had risen and in the May 1965 contests 23 of the 33 seats in the Assembly were won by Hutus, and 10 of these were won by politicians from the Hutu-interest aligned Party of the People (PP). UPRONA won a majority 21 seats, but by then the party had lost cohesion and was overtaken by factionalism. Hutus were subsequently selected by the Assembly to lead its bureau. Siryuyumunsi was elected to the newly created Senate. While discussions on the creation of a new government took place, Hutu politician Gervais Nyangoma offered himself as a candidate to be named prime minister. In August the Mwami rejected consideration of Nyangoma for the premiership, surprising Hutu deputies in the Assembly. Tutsi parliamentarians suggested Siryuyumunsi for the position, but he was also passed over. On 13 September Mwambutsa instead selected Léopold Biha, a trusted Ganwa associated with his court, to lead the government.

In October a group of mostly-Hutu soldiers launched a coup attempt. The attempt failed, though Biha was wounded. Parliament was thereafter dissolved, and on 15 March 1966 Biha revamped his government and appointed Siryuyumunsi as a Minister of State. On 8 July Crown Prince Charles Ndizeye mounted a coup. He declared himself the new head of state and suspended the constitution. He dismissed the Biha government and appointed a new one led by Army Captain Michel Micombero as prime minister. On 1 September Ndizeye was formally crowned as Mwami Ntare IV. Soon thereafter conflict arose between Ntare, who wished to actively rule, and the new government and its supporters, eager to implement progressive reforms without interference from the crown. On 28 November, while Ntare was abroad, the army launched a coup and proclaimed the transformation of Burundi into a republic under the leadership of Micombero as the new President of Burundi. Siryuyumunsi's role in politics thereafter dwindled.

== Later life ==
In the spring of 1968 Siryuyumunsi was accused of writing a monarchist tract which attacked Micombero's regime. He was arrested and sentenced to 10 years' imprisonment in January 1969. He was released on 1 July 1971 and subsequently took up work at RUCEP. He later died.

== Works cited ==
- "Le Burundi a la Recherche d'Une Stabilite". Présence Africaine (in French) (47): 235–241. 1963. JSTOR 24348312.
- Chrétien, Jean-Pierre; Dupaquier, Jean-François (2007). Burundi 1972, au bord des génocides (in French). Paris: Karthala Editions. ISBN 9782845868724.
- Eggers, Ellen K. (2006). Historical Dictionary of Burundi (third ed.). Lanham: Scarecrow Press. ISBN 978-0-8108-5302-7.
- Ghislain, Jean (1970). La Féodalité au Burundi (PDF) (in French). Brussels: Académie royale des Sciences d’Outre-Mer. OCLC 2115033.
- Lemarchand, René (1970). Rwanda and Burundi. New York: Praeger Publishers. OCLC 254366212.
- Lemarchand, René (1996). Burundi: Ethnic Conflict and Genocide (1st ed.). Cambridge: Cambridge University Press. ISBN 0-521-56623-1.
- Weinstein, Warren (1976). Historical Dictionary of Burundi. Metuchen: Scarecrow Press. ISBN 9780810809628.
