= 1972 in Burundi =

- Decades: 1950s; 1960s; 1970s; 1980s; 1990s
- See also: Other events of 1972; List of years in Burundi

The following lists events that happened during 1972 in Burundi.

== Incumbents ==
- President: Michel Micombero
- Prime Minister: vacant (until July 15), Albin Nyamoya (starting July 15)

== Events ==
=== April ===
- April 29 - An uprising in Burundi by the Hutu people against the Tutsi-dominated government, began with machete attacks that killed more than 3,000 Tutsi civilians and soldiers. In the words of one observer, "the ferocity of the ensuing repression by the army was beyond imagination", with more than 100,000 Hutus being massacred over the next five months. In the genocide that followed, educated Hutu people—schoolchildren, college students, civil servants—were murdered, "especially anyone wearing glasses".

=== May ===
- May 1 - Hutu rebels set up their own short-lived, "People's Republic of Martyazo", at the Bururi Province. The Tutsi-dominated Burundian Army ended the secession movement within two weeks, before beginning the slaughter of thousands of Hutus.
