= Jeanne d'Arc Kagayo =

Burundian politician

Jeanne d'Arc Kagayo (born c. 1963) is a Burundian politician and educator. She served as Burundi's minister of the presidency for good governance from 2018 to 2020.

After a career as a school principal, she became involved in politics, joining the Green Party-Intwari after the Arusha Accords put an end to the Burundian Civil War. As a member of the Amizero y’Abarundi coalition, she was named minister of communal development in 2015, then minister of good governance in 2018.

== Career ==
Jeanne d'Arc Kagayo studied at the teachers training school in Kanyinya, in Burundi's Kirundo province. She then studied at l'Institut Supérieur de Contrôle et de Gestion, whose director, André Nkundikije, would later recruit her to his Green Party-Intwari.

She worked for several years as a primary school teacher and then principal in Kirundo. In 1994, she moved to the Bujumbura area, where she taught in Kinindo before again becoming a principal.

In 2000, Kagayo was elected to the National Assembly of Burundi.

Five years later, amid internal struggles in the entirely Tutsi Green Party-Intwari, her party faced a bitter failure in municipal elections and decided to ally itself with the Hutu National Forces of Liberation party, led by Agathon Rwasa. The coalition was dubbed Amizero y’Abarundi.

She was named minister of communal development in 2015, then minister of the presidency for good governance on April 17, 2018.

In June 2020, President Évariste Ndayishimiye announced a slimmed-down cabinet that did not include the portfolio previously held by Kagayo.

== Personal life ==
A widow, Kagayo has six children and at least two grandchildren. She is a practicing Catholic.
