= Pascal Nyabenda =

Burundian politician

His Excellency Pascal Nyabenda

President of the National Assembly
- In office 30 July 2015 – 7 August 2020
- Preceded by: Pie Ntavyohanyuma
- Succeeded by: Gelase Ndabirabe

Personal details
- Born: 12 April 1966 (age 59) Mpanda, Bubanza Province, Burundi
- Party: National Council for the Defense of Democracy
- Occupation: Politician

Pascal Nyabenda (born 12 April 1966) is a Burundian politician, who served as President of the National Assembly of Burundi from July 2015 to August 2020. He has been president of the ruling National Council for the Defense of Democracy – Forces for the Defense of Democracy since March 2012 (as well as heading the party's parliamentary group prior) and previously served as Governor of Bubanza Province.

== Biography ==
Pascal Nyabenda was born in Mpanda in Bubanza Province, Burundi on 12 April 1966. He worked as a teacher but fled into exile in 1995 during the Burundian Civil War. He lived as a refugee in the Democratic Republic of the Congo, Kenya and Tanzania, and became a representative of the rebel National Council for the Defense of Democracy – Forces for the Defense of Democracy (Conseil national pour la Défense de la Démocratie – Forces pour la Défense de la Démocratie, CNDD–FDD). He returned to Burundi under the regime of President Pierre Nkurunziza and held various offices. He served as Governor of Bubanza Province from March 2006.

Nyabenda was elected to the National Assembly in the June 2015 parliamentary election as a CNDD–FDD candidate, and he was elected by the deputies as President of the National Assembly on 30 July 2015. There was no other candidate for the post, and Nyabenda received 101 votes.
