= 2024 in Burundi =

- Decades: 2000s; 2010s; 2020s
- See also: Other events of 2024; List of years in Burundi

Events in the year 2024 in Burundi.

== Incumbents ==
- President: Évariste Ndayishimiye
- Prime Minister: Gervais Ndirakobuca

== Events ==
- 25 February – Nine people are killed, mostly civilians, and five others are injured in an attack by the RED-Tabara rebel group in Gihanga, Bubanza Province.
- 2-11 August--The 9th Africa Scout Jamboree was held in Bungere National Scout Camp, Gitega, Burundi. This event is four youngsters, ages 12-17 and is attended by thousands.
- 22 August – Burundi reports 171 new mpox cases, raising the total case count in the country to 572 cases.
- 22 August – President Evariste Ndayishimiye issues pardons to 5,442 inmates, equivalent to 41% of the country's prison population, as part of efforts to ease overcrowding in jails.

== Holidays ==
- 1 January - New Year's Day
- 5 February - Unity Day
- 6 April - Cyprien Ntaryamira Day
- 1 May - Labour Day
- 9 May - Ascension Day
- 16 June – Eid al-Adha
- 1 July – Independence Day
- 15 August – Assumption
- 13 October – Rwagasore Day
- 21 October – Ndadaye Day
- 1 November – All Saints' Day
- 25 December – Christmas Day

== See also ==
- Culture of Burundi
- Tourism in Burundi
- Music of Burundi
