= Faustin Ndikumana =

- Occupation: Anti-corruption activist
- Organization: Parole et Action pour le Réveil des Consciences et l'Evolution des Mentalités

Faustin Ndikumana (born 1970) is a Burundian economist and anti-corruption activist. In February 2012, he was detained for two weeks on charges of making "false declarations", leading Amnesty International to designate him a prisoner of conscience.

== Biography ==
Faustin Ndikumana was born in 1970 in Kinyami in the Commune of Ngozi in Burundi. He is a licensed economist (since 1997). He represented the national youth committee from 1998 to 2000, he was one of the founders of coalition of youth organizations called CPAJ (Collectif pour la Promotion des Associations des Jeunes). In 2000, he was hired as a bank executive at Interbank Burundi. He left that job in 2008 to devote his time to humanitarian projects. He helped found the non-governmental organization Parole et Action pour le Réveil des Consciences et l'Evolution des Mentalités (PARCEM) (English: "Words and Action for the Awakening of Conscience and the Evolution of Mindsets").

== Activism and imprisonment ==
In early 2012, Ndikumana wrote to the Burundian Justice Minister, Pascal Barandagiye, stating that PARCEM had been told by new judges that they had been asked to pay US$1,000 to $1,500 in exchange for their appointments. On 3 February, Ndikumana held a press conference to make the allegations public.

Ndikumana was arrested by agents of the Anti-Corruption Brigade on 7 February while giving an interview to Radio Publique Africaine. He was then taken before a magistrate of the Anti-Corruption Court, apparently on the basis of a complaint by the Justice Minister. The court charged him under Article 14 of the Anti-Corruption Law with making "false declarations", which carries a maximum sentence of ten years' imprisonment and a fine of 1 million Burundian francs (US$716). Ndikumana was then transferred to Mpimba Central Prison in Bujumbura.

Ndikumana's detention immediately drew domestic and international criticism. Front Line Defenders expressed concern, stating that Ndikumana's arrest appeared to be "motivated by his work against corruption in the judicial system and its impact on access to equitable justice for all citizens". Amnesty International designated him a prisoner of conscience, "detained solely for exercising his right to freedom of expression", and called for his immediate arrest. The organization also noted its concern that the arrest might have a "chilling effect" on other activists and journalists. Ten Burundian civil society groups rallied in Bujumbura on 14 February to call for Ndikumana's release, with Gabriel Rufyiri of the Anti-corruption and Economic Malpractice Observatory urging the government to free Ndikumana and become "more transparent in recruitment".

On 17 February, a court rejected Ndikumana's bail plea, ruling that he must remain in prison; however, the court reversed its decision four days later, and he was released on bail on 21 February. Agence France-Presse attributed the about-face to diplomatic pressure on Ndikumana's behalf, particularly from the European Union. As part of Ndikumana's bail terms, he cannot leave the Bujumbura area or travel to the airport, and he must report to the court each Thursday.

== Website ==
Parcem
