= Zacharie Gahutu =

Burundian diplomat (born 1950)

Zacharie Gahutu (born 29 November 1950 in Ngozi Province) is a Burundian diplomat. He was appointed as Burundi's Permanent Representative (Ambassador) to the United Nations in July 2009, replacing Augustin Nsanze. Prior to his appointment to the United Nations, Gahutu was the Chief of Staff to the President of the National Assembly of Burundi beginning in March 2007.
