= Lydwine Baradahana =

Burundian Minister of Public Health

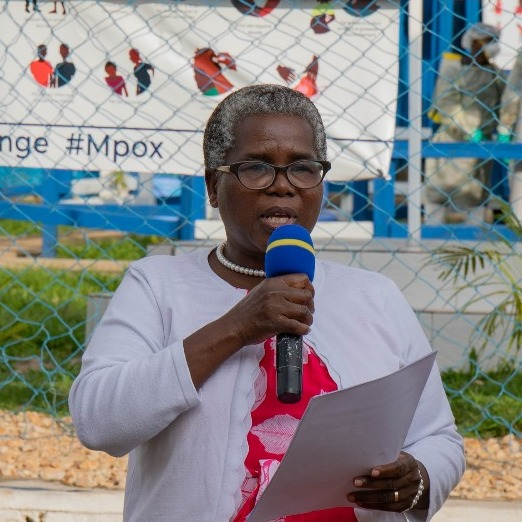
- in 2024
- Known for: Minister of Public Health and the Fight against AIDS

Lydwine Baradahana became the Burundian Minister of Public Health and the Fight against AIDS in 2023. She has been involved in controlling an outbreak of Mpox and the introduction of the routine vaccination against malaria for young children.

== Life ==
Baradahana became the Minister of Public Health and the Fight against AIDS under President Evariste Ndayishimiye on 3 September 2023. The previous minister was Thaddée Ndikumana.

In July 2024 she reassured the population after it was suspected that there had been an outbreak of Monkeypox in Burundi. However, later that month, it was confirmed that there were three cases in the capital. In August she announced a $15m programme to address the threat of Mpox in the country following more confirmed cases. That month she announced that the number of cases exceeded 150. At the end of the year the Africa Centres for Disease Control and Prevention gave $300,000 worth of kits that allowed Mpox infection to be confirmed. These allowed the ministry to confirm that they had over 3,000 cases in April 2025.

In April 2025 Angeline Ndayishimiye the First Lady of Burundi attended the launch of routine Malaria vaccination in Burundi. She thanked the organisations who had supported the government's plan. It was organised by the Ministry and organisations including UNICEF. Baradahana welcomed the arrival of 544,000 doses that could be given to those under the age of five which could see the end of deaths from malaria.
