= Marina Barampama =

Burundian politician

Vice President of Burundi
- In office 8 September 2006 – 8 February 2007
- President: Pierre Nkurunziza
- Preceded by: Alice Nzomukunda
- Succeeded by: Gabriel Ntisezerana

Personal details
- Born: 1969 (age 56–57)
- Party: CNDD–FDD (former); UPD (current)

Marina Barampama (born 1969) is a Burundian politician. She was elected Second Vice President on 8 September 2006, replacing Alice Nzomukunda. She remained in post for six months, until she was sacked for her support of Hussein Radjabu. Formerly a member of the National Council for the Defense of Democracy-Forces for the Defense of Democracy (CNDD–FDD), she is now General Secretary of the Union for Peace and Development.

== Political career ==
After the resignation of Vice President Alice Nzomukunda over corruption and human rights abuses, Barampama was nominated for the role by President Pierre Nkurunziza on 8 September 2006. She was almost unknown, and the members of the opposition party, Union for National Progress (UPRONA), walked out of the vote in protest over the lack of information provided about her. They subsequently argued that Barampama's election was invalid, since without their members, there were not enough members voting to form a quorum.

She was sacked by Nkurunziza on 8 February 2007; he attributed this to insubordination and irresponsibility. Barampama had been a supporter of Hussein Radjabu, the former chairman of the National Council for the Defense of Democracy – Forces for the Defense of Democracy (CNDD–FDD), who was ousted as chairman by the President shortly before Barampama's sacking. Radjabu was subsequently arrested and imprisoned for 13 years for subversion.

She subsequently switched allegiance to the Union for Peace and Development (UPD), and by 2015 had become General Secretary of the party. Following the increase in violence seen in the Burundian unrest, and the murder of party spokesperson Patrice Gahungu, Barampama feared for her life as she said that the UPN was seen as a threat to the government.

Political offices
Preceded by Alice Nzomukunda	Vice-President of Burundi; 2006–2007	Succeeded by Gabriel Ntisezerana
