= Angeline Ndayishimiye =

First Lady of Burundi since 2020

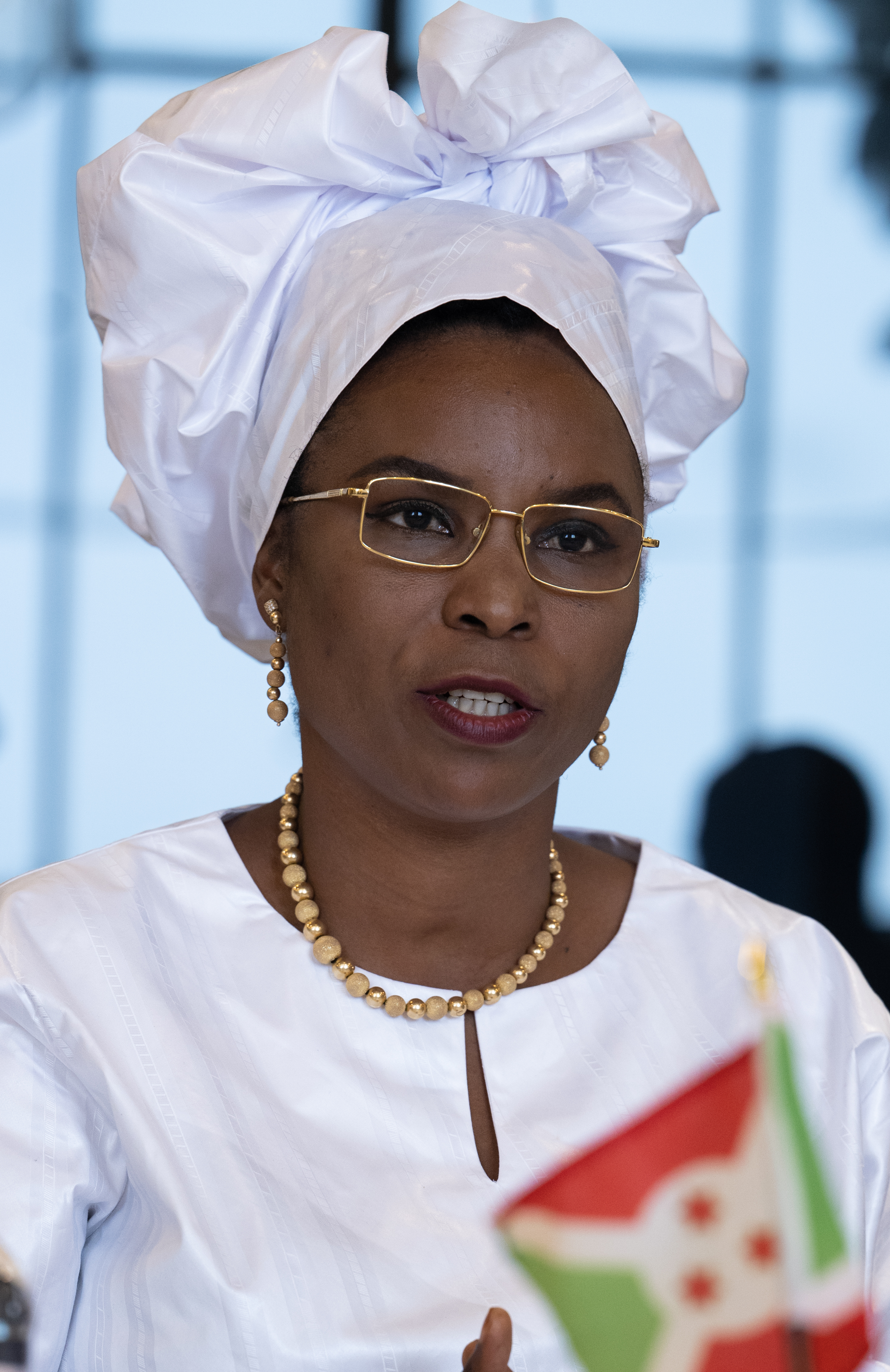
- Ndayishimiye in 2023

First Lady of Burundi
- Incumbent
- Assumed office 18 June 2020
- President: Évariste Ndayishimiye
- Preceded by: Denise Bucumi-Nkurunziza

Personal details
- Born: 12 January 1976 (age 50)
- Spouse: Évariste Ndayishimiye
- Children: Six

Angeline Ndayishimiye Ndayubaha (born 1976) became the First Lady of Burundi in 2020. In 2023 she was given the United Nations Population Award.

== Life ==
Ndayubaha was born in 1976.

She was a lieutenant when she left the armed forces in 2004. In 2005 she started working at Société Burundaise de Gestion des Entrepôts et d'Assistance des Avions en Escale (SOBUGEA), a Burundian company that organises freight for delivery by air. From 2010 to 2012 she led that company's human resources and administration department, and was later appointed Administrative and Financial Director. She had a break at Air Burundi for a year but otherwise she held this position until 2018.

In 2017 she created an organisation named Femmes Intwari whose purpose is to champion democratic peace. Femmes Intwari's members are women who have, like her, served in the military or who are the widows of Birundian soldiers." In 2019 she founded and became the president of the organisation Umugiraneza which works in poverty alleviation focusing on children and widows. Umugiraneza provides health care, paid work, education and training.

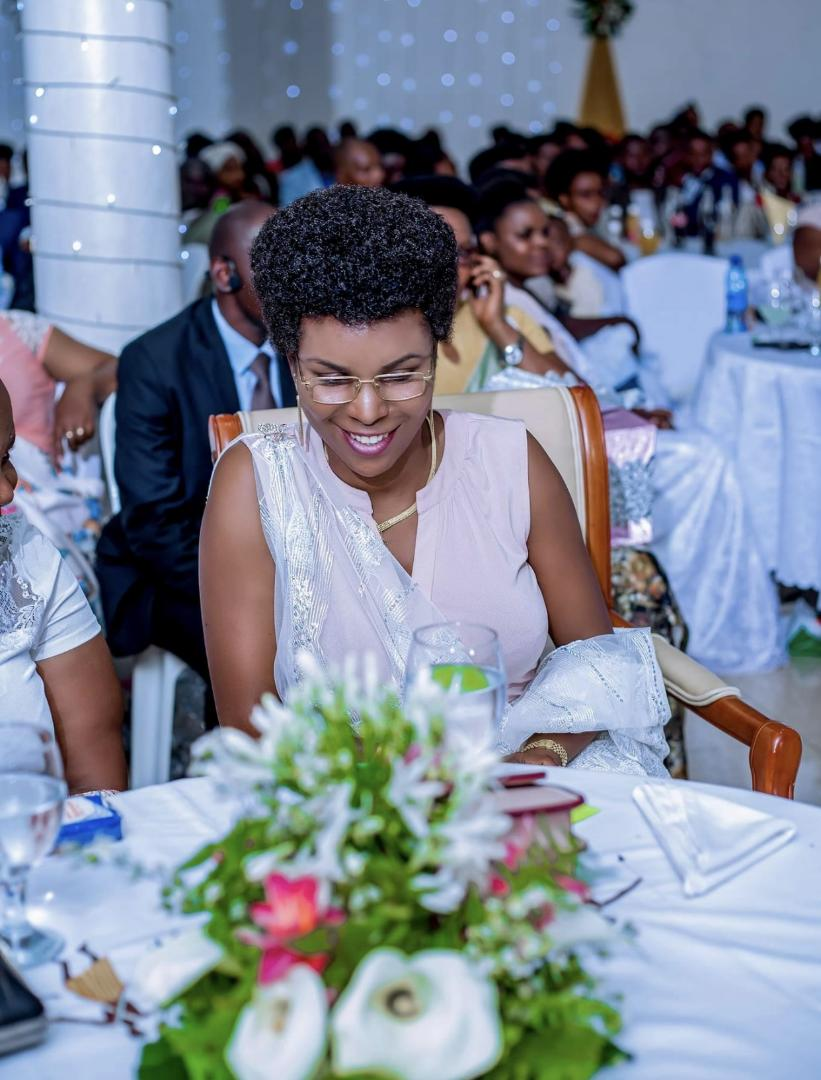

On 18 June 2020 she became the First Lady of Burundi. She was preceded by Denise Bucumi-Nkurunziza.

In May 2023 she was elected to be the 10th President of the Africa First Ladies' Peace Mission (AFLPM). In July 2023 she received the individual award of the United Nations Population Award. The institutional award went to the African Institute for Development Policy (AFIDEP). Earlier that year the BBC reported that she bought her own clothes.

She and the African First Ladies are ambassadors for the German based Merck organisation. They established the "More than a Mother" campaign to de-stigmatise women who are infertile, and in 2017 they began their annual media awards.

In April 2025 she attended the launch of routine Malaria vaccination in Burundi as it was organised by the Minister of Health Lydwine Baradahana and UNICEF.

== Private life ==
She and her husband have six children.
