= ADC–Ikibiri =

Political coalition in Burundi

ADC-Ikibiri (Alliance of Democrats for Change) is a coalition of opposition parties and movements in Burundi.

The coalition was formed in 2010 after opposition parties claimed massive fraud in the May communal elections. The ruling party, CNDD-FDD, received 64 percent of the vote and written vote tallies were not publicized, in violation of the electoral law. The newly formed coalition called for a boycott of subsequent elections. During the election campaigns parties used intimidation tactics and some resorted to violence. In an effort to avoid arrest ADC-Ikibiri spokesperson Leonard Nyangoma went into hiding that summer. The government also shut down a press conference the coalition intended for September 17.

In October 2014, Léonce Ngendakumana, the head of the coalition which at that time numbered 11 major parties, was sentenced to one year in prison "for incitement to racial hatred and making damaging allegations and false accusations". In February Ngendakumana had sent a letter to the UN Secretary-General urging the international community to assist against the ruling party's incitement of violence.
