= Thérence Sinunguruza =

Burundi politician (1959–2020)

Thérence Sinunguruza (2 August 1959 – 8 May 2020) was a Burundian Tutsi politician and active member of Union for National Progress (UPRONA), who served as First Vice President of Burundi, in charge of political, administrative and security matters, from 2010 to October 2013, when he resigned. Previously he was a Member of Parliament from 2005 to 2010. Sinunguruza held various ministerial positions, including Minister of Institutional Reforms from 1994 to 1996, Minister of Justice from 1997 to 2001 and Minister of Foreign Affairs from 2001 to 2005. He was Burundian Permanent Representative to the United Nations in New York from 1993 to 1994.

After President Pierre Nkurunziza was reelected for a second term in 2010, Sinunguruza was appointed as First Vice President. Therence Sinunguruza was known to be multilingual and a big fan of basketball. He was married to Odette Ndikumagenge and father of four children.

Political offices
Preceded by Yves Sahinguvu	Vice-President of Burundi; 2010–2013	Succeeded by Bernard Busokoza
