= Bernard Busokoza =

Burundi politician (born 1953)

Vice President of Burundi
- In office October 2013 – February 1, 2014
- Preceded by: Therence Sinunguruza
- Succeeded by: Prosper Bazombanza

Personal details
- Born: August 6, 1953 (age 71); Commune of Mugamba, Bururi Province, Burundi
- Political party: Union for National Progress

Bernard Busokoza (born August 6, 1953) is a Burundi Tutsi politician who served as the Vice President of Burundi from October 2013 to February 1, 2014.

== Early life and education ==
Busokoza was born on August 6, 1953, in Mugamba Commune, Bururi Province, Burundi. In 1974, he graduated from the University of Burundi with a degree in economics.

== Business career ==
Busokoza has held various senior positions across the country in the telecommunications field.

He was vice chairman of the Board of Directors of Meridien Biao Bank from 1988 until 1991. And From 1996–1999, he was CEO of Afritel Burundi (VoIP provider). From 2000 to 2008 he was chairman of the board of directors of Africell Burundi (mobile network).

== Vice Presidency ==
In October 2013, Therence Sinunguruza resigned as vice president and Busokoza assumed the position.

=== Sacking ===
On February 1, 2014, after Busokoza opposed his plans to scrap presidential term limits, Pierre Nkurunziza, the President of Burundi, decided to dismiss Busokoza, sparking a major political crisis in Burundi. Some even compared the crisis to the South Sudanese Civil War. On 19 October 2020 the Supreme Court of Burundi sentenced Busokoza and 18 others to prison for involvement in the 1993 coup attempt and murder of President Melchior Ndadaye.

== Personal life ==
Busokoza is a father of 6 children. He practices Catholicism.
