= Ernest Manirumva =

Ernest Manirumva (died April 9, 2009) was a leading Burundian anti-corruption activist.

Manirumva had served as the deputy chairman of the Anti-corruption and Economic Malpractice Observatory (Observatoire de lutte contre la corruption et les malversations économiques or OLUCOME), a non-governmental, anti-graft watchdog group, before his murder in 2009. The organization has been responsible for uncovering a number of corruption scandals within the Burundian government and the business community in recent years.

Ernest Manirumva was murdered in Bujumbura, on the night of 8–9 April 2009.

== Murder ==
Ernest Manirumva was the victim of telephone and written threats on several occasions in the past, including threats put on the Internet.

On the night of 8–9 April, intruders reportedly broke into the home of Ernest Manirumva in Bujumbura. They ransacked the house and stole several documents related to the activities of OLUCOME. Members of OLUCOME, who discovered the body of Ernest Manirumva, believe that he was forced to lead the intruders to these documents since they found blood stains all over the house. Ernest Manirumva was stabbed several times by the intruders and he received severe head trauma. The same night, his office was also broken into but while nothing of value was taken, his lap-top was still connected.

A number of sources believe that the murder of Ernest Manirumva is directly related to his legitimate work in the defence of human rights, particularly his investigation on arms trafficking to the ruling party of Burundi CNDD-FDD.

On the evening of Wednesday, April 8, 2009, Manirumva was abducted from his office and taken to his home in Bujumbura where he was killed. His office and home were ransacked in the attack. Police believe that Manirumva, who suffered stab wounds to his head, was killed at home after midnight on April 9, 2009. Manirumva's body was discovered by neighbors on Thursday morning.

A police spokesperson told the media following the discovery of the crime scene that, "Manirumva was assassinated after midnight. We don't yet know the people who committed the crime but investigations have started." Gervais Ndirakobuca, a deputy police chief, noted that Manirumva's murder was not "an ordinary crime during a robbery."

New evidence pointed to the involvement of Burundi Police senior officer Colonel David Nikiza, the head of Burundi intelligence was also suspected according to individuals involved in the political assassination of Ernest Manirumva. His colleagues have alleged that Ernest Manirumva was probably killed as a result of his investigation on Burundi's ruling party CNDD FDD arms trafficking with Khartoum and Rwanda Genocide forces DRC based FDLR.

Olucome spokesperson Richard Ntawe told the BBC's French language service that, "We are shocked by the cold-blooded murder of our deputy president. We are convinced that this his assassination is linked to the work he was doing. They didn't steal anything, they were looking for specific documents."

OLUCOME officials have demanded an international investigation into Manirumva's murder.
