= Gelase Ndabirabe =

Burundian politician

President of the National Assembly of Burundi
- Incumbent
- Assumed office 7 August 2020
- Preceded by: Pascal Nyabenda

Personal details
- Born: 1957 (age 68–69)
- Party: CNDD–FDD

Gélase Daniel Ndabirabe (born 1957) is a Burundian politician from the CNDD–FDD. He has been President of the National Assembly since 7 August 2020.
