= Christian Nduwimana =

Burundian footballer

Personal information
- Date of birth: 18 May 1983 (age 43)
- Place of birth: Bujumbura, Burundi
- Height: 1.70 m (5 ft 7 in)
- Position: Striker

Team information
- Current team: K Wolvertem SC

Senior career*
Years	Team	Apps	(Gls)
–2005	K.V.V. Eendracht Genenbos		
2005–2007	KVK Wellen		
2007–2010	Herk F.C.		
2010	K Wolvertem SC		

International career^{‡}
2007–	Burundi	2	(0)
- * Club domestic league appearances and goals as of 18 June 2008 ‡ National team caps and goals as of 18 June 2008

Christian Nduwimana (born 18 May 1983 in Bujumbura) is a Burundian football midfielder. He currently plays for Belgium club K Wolvertem SC.

== Trivia ==
He played the first national team game on 7 June 2008 in Ouagadougou Vs. Burkina Faso national football team.
