= Musenyi =

- Location in Burundi
- Coordinates: 3°11′30″S 29°24′20″E
- Country: Burundi
- Province: Bubanza Province
- Commune: Commune of Mpanda
- Time zone: UTC+2 (Central Africa Time)

MUSENYI

Musenyi is a village in the Commune of Tangara in Ngozi Province in north Burundi.
