= Immaculée Nahayo =

Burundian politician (1948–2018)

Immaculée Nahayo Nyandwi

President of the National Assembly of Burundi
- In office 16 August 2005 – 16 March 2007
- Preceded by: Jean Minani
- Succeeded by: Pie Ntavyohanyuma

Personal details
- Born: 1948 Gatara, Kayanza Province, Burundi
- Died: November 17, 2018 (aged 70) Brussels, Belgium
- Spouse: Simon Nyandwi (died 2005)
- Children: 6

Immaculée Nahayo Nyandwi (1948 - 17 November 2018) was a Burundian politician who was President of the National Assembly of Burundi from 16 August 2005 to 2007, the first woman to hold this position in Burundi. She was also elected as Speaker of the African Parliamentary Union (APU) to March 2007.

== Political career ==
An ethnic Hutu member of the National Council for the Defense of Democracy-Forces for the Defense of Democracy (CNDD-FDD), she replaced Jean Minani of the Front for Democracy in Burundi (FRODEBU), who had been National Assembly president since 2002.

She subsequently served as Minister of National Solidarity, Repatriation, National Reconstruction, Human Rights, & Gender beginning in July 2007. She has been elected as Adviser in COMESA.

== Personal life and death ==
Born in Gatara (Kayanza Province), Nahayo was the mother of six children. Her husband, Simon Nyandwi, was interior minister until his death on 22 March 2005.

Nyandwi died on 17 November 2018 in Brussels, Belgium, aged 70.

== See also ==
- List of presidents of the National Assembly of Burundi
