= 2025 in Burundi =

- Decades: 2000s; 2010s; 2020s
- See also: Other events of 2025; List of years in Burundi

Events in the year 2025 in Burundi.

== Incumbents ==
- President: Évariste Ndayishimiye
- Prime Minister: Gervais Ndirakobuca

== Events ==
=== January ===
- 31 January – Tanzania and Burundi sign a $2.15 billion deal with Chinese firms to build an 84km railway from Malagarasi to Musongati.

=== March ===
- 21 March – Ivory Coast wins 1-0 over Burundi in the 2026 FIFA World Cup qualifier.
- 27 March – South Africa and Burundi make a Public Service Partnership to boost State Capacity.

=== May ===
- 26 May – Severe food shortages and rising violence are reported in Musenyi refugee camp due to international aid cuts.

=== June ===
- 4 June – US President Donald Trump issues a proclamation imposing partial restrictions on Burundian nationals travelling to the United States.
- 5 June – 2025 Burundian parliamentary election: The ruling CNDD-FDD wins all 100 contested seats in the National Assembly.

=== July ===
- 17 July – President Ndayishimiye is designated by the African Union as its special envoy to the Sahel region.
- 28 July – A magnitude 5.1 earthquake hits Rumonge, triggering a crowd crush that injures 14 people in neighboring Rwanda.

=== September ===
- 7 September – Former foreign minister Ézéchiel Nibigira is appointed as president of the Economic Community of Central African States.

=== December ===
- 15 December – M23 rebels capture several hundred Burundian soldiers during fighting in the eastern Democratic Republic of the Congo, stating they will return the prisoners if formally requested while calling for the withdrawal of Burundian forces from the region.

== Holidays ==
- 1 January – New Year's Day
- 5 February – Unity Day
- 6 April – Cyprien Ntaryamira Day
- 1 May – Labour Day
- 9 May – Ascension Day
- 6 June – Eid al-Adha
- 1 July – Independence Day
- 15 August – Assumption
- 13 October – Rwagasore Day
- 21 October – Ndadaye Day
- 1 November – All Saints' Day
- 25 December – Christmas Day
