= Mathias Sinamenye =

Burundian politician (born 1946)

Mathias Sinamenye (born in 1946) is an Economist by profession and became 2nd Vice-President of Burundi from 12 June 1998 to 1 November 2001. Previously he was the governor of the central bank of Burundi from 1992 to 1998. He is a member of the Tutsi ethnic group.

On 12 June 1998, he was appointed 2nd Vice-President (responsible for economic and social affairs), by Interim President Pierre Buyoya. He held that post until a new power-sharing government was installed on 1 November 2001.

After Vice Presidency, he was appointed Executive Director of the World Bank Group in charge of the African region.

Political offices
Preceded by Office created	Vice-President of Burundi; 1998–2001	Succeeded by Domitien Ndayizeye
