= Augustin Nsanze =

Burundian historian, politician and diplomat

Augustin Nsanze (born 1953) is a Burundian historian, politician and diplomat. He was the Chief Advisor to Burundi President Pierre Nkurunziza. Prior to this role Nsanze was Burundi's Minister for Foreign Affairs (Secretary of State) from 2009 to 2011. During President Nkurunziza's first administration he was appointed as Burundi's Ambassador to the United Nations in New York. Prior to entering politics, Nsanze was a professor and researcher at Hope Africa University and the University of Burundi.
