= Gervais Nyangoma =

Burundian politician and diplomat

Gervais Nyangoma (died October 1965) was a Burundian politician and diplomat.

== Early life ==
Gervais Nyangoma was born in Bururi Province in southern Burundi. A Hutu, he attended the Groupe Scolaire de Astrida from 1952 to 1958, where he was bullied by some Tutsi students due to his ethnicity. As a result of this, Nyangoma kept to himself and focused on his studies, in which he excelled. In 1959 he enrolled at the Université de l'Etat à Elisabethville in the Belgian Congo to study commercial science. From 1960 to 1962 he attended the Free University of Brussels, graduating with a license (Master of Arts) in commercial science. While there he loosely affiliated himself with the Cercle Patrice Lumumba, a left-wing student organisation, and thus gained a reputation in Burundi as a left-wing extremist.

== Career ==
In 1963 Nyangoma was hired to serve as a counselor at the Burundian embassy in Belgium. He soon thereafter transferred to its mission at the United Nations. Minister of Foreign Affairs Lorgio Nimubona openly opposed giving Nyangoma an ambassadorship. Following the minister's death in an airplane crash, Prime Minister Pierre Ngendandumwe appointed him Ambassador to the UN in October 1963. In February 1965 Nyangoma was recalled to Burundi and made chef de cabinet for Prime Minister Joseph Bamina. He affiliated himself with the Party of the People, a Hutu-dominated party that contested in the May 1965 elections for the National Assembly. Meanwhile, Mwami Mwambutsa IV came into increasing conflict with the parliamentary government. On 1 July, the third anniversary of Burundian independence, he delivered a speech at Rwagasore Stadium in which he accused the crown of creating "governmental instability, administrative anarchy, and political chaos". He called for "a new party, a new economy, and a new state."

While discussions on the creation of a new government took place in wake of the elections, Nyangoma offered himself as a candidate to be named prime minister. In August the Mwami rejected consideration of him for the premiership, surprising Hutu deputies in the Assembly. On 13 September Mwambutsa instead selected Léopold Biha, a trusted Ganwa associated with his court, to lead the government. The installation of Biha infuriated many Hutus and some extremist Tutsis.

== Death ==
Late in the night of 18 October 1965, a group of Hutu gendarmes and soldiers attempted a coup, attacking the Mwami's palace and wounding Biha, but ultimately failing to seize power. The remnants of the Biha government set about repressing the perpetrators of the coup and suspected collaborators. They quickly detained leading Hutu politicians, including Nyangoma. Despite a lack of concrete evidence, Nyangoma was generally assumed by the government and its agents to have conceived the plot. He was summarily executed.

== Works cited ==
- Lemarchand, René (1970). Rwanda and Burundi. New York: Praeger Publishers. OCLC 254366212.
- Weinstein, Warren (1976). Historical Dictionary of Burundi. Metuchen: Scarecrow Press. ISBN 9780810809628.
