= Thaddée Ndikumana =

Burundian politician

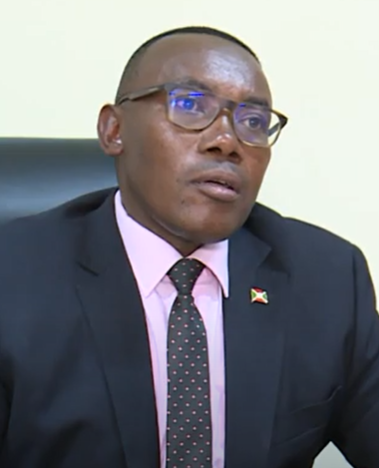

Minister of Public Health and HIV/Aids fight of Burundi
- Incumbent
- Assumed office 28 June 2020
- President: Évariste Ndayishimiye

Personal details
- Born: Burundi
- Party: CNDD–FDD

Thaddée Ndikumana is a Burundian politician and educator. He was the Minister of Public Health and HIV/Aids fight in Burundi, having been appointed to the position in 2020 by the president of Burundi, Évariste Ndayishimiye. His term began on 28 June 2020. The next minister was Lydwine Baradahana who began work in September 2023.

Awards and achievements
Preceded by	Minister of Public Health and HIV/Aids fight of Burundi	Succeeded by
