= Martin Nduwimana =

Burundian politician (born 1958)

Martin Nduwimana (born 1958) was the First Vice-President of Burundi from 29 August 2005 to November 2007. He is an ethnic Tutsi member of the Union for National Progress (UPRONA) party.

He is originally from Mugamba commune in Bururi Province.

Nduwimana was nominated by President Pierre Nkurunziza on 29 August 2005. He was endorsed by both chambers of parliament (National Assembly - 108 votes 'for', one abstention and 47 votes 'for', 1 'against' in the Senate) and immediately sworn in.

According to the constitution, Burundi's First Vice-President is responsible for political and administrative affairs.

Nduwimana announced on 7 November 2007 that he had resigned as First Vice-President and that Nkurunziza had accepted his resignation. This followed UPRONA's disapproval of what it considered to be Nduwimana's failure to unhold the party's interests in the government. On 8 November, another member of UPRONA, Yves Sahinguvu, was elected as First Vice-President. Afterwards, Nduwimana was reported to be seeking work with the United Nations Integrated Office in Burundi.

Political offices
Preceded by Frédéric Ngenzebuhoro	First Vice-President of Burundi; 2005–2007	Succeeded by Yves Sahinguvu
