= Epitace Bayaganakandi =

Burundian politician

Colonel Epitace Bayaganakandi (born 1956) is a Burundian politician. Since 2002, he has been president of the Movement for the Rehabilitation of Citizens-Rurenzangemero (MRC-Rurenzangemero).

Bayaganakandi is an ethnic Tutsi from Muramvya province.
