= Alice Nzomukunda =

Burundian politician (born 1966)

Alice Nzomukunda (born 12 April 1966) is a Burundian politician and former Second Vice-President of the country, from 29 August 2005 to 5 September 2006. She is an ethnic Hutu and was a member of the National Council for the Defense of Democracy-Forces for the Defense of Democracy (CNDD-FDD).

According to the constitution, Burundi's Second Vice-President is responsible for economic and social affairs. Nzomukunda was nominated by President Pierre Nkurunziza on 29 August 2005. She was endorsed by both chambers of parliament (National Assembly – 109 votes 'for', none 'against' and 46 votes 'for', 2 'against' in the Senate) and immediately sworn in. She is originally from Bujumbura, Burundi's largest city and former capital.

On 5 September 2006, Nzomukunda resigned as Second Vice-President, citing corruption and human rights abuses by the government, as well as casting doubt on the authenticity of a coup plot which saw former president Domitien Ndayizeye arrested a few weeks before on August 21. She was replaced as Second Vice-President by Marina Barampama.

Nzomukunda subsequently became First Vice-President of the National Assembly. In January 2008, Nzomukunda was expelled from the CNDD-FDD "for internal disciplinary reasons" at an extraordinary congress of the party. The CNDD-FDD also decided to remove her from her post as First Vice-President of the National Assembly, and on 8 February 2008 it was announced in the National Assembly that her post was vacant; according to Evariste Ndayishimiye, the President of the CNDD-FDD Parliamentary Group, since Nzomukunda had been expelled from the CNDD-FDD, she was no longer part of its parliamentary group, "did not represent anything", and was not entitled to the post of First Vice-President of the National Assembly. Other parties in the National Assembly disputed this, however, arguing that such a decision would have to be made by the National Assembly as a whole, not by a single party. The Front for Democracy in Burundi (FRODEBU) suspended its participation in the National Assembly to protest the use of force against Nzomukunda. Ndayishimiye said that parliamentary affairs should not be disrupted by internal party matters and alleged that FRODEBU had secret reasons for defending Nzomukunda.

Political offices
| Preceded by Frédéric Ngenzebuhoro | Vice-President of Burundi; 2005–2006 | Succeeded by Marina Barampama |
