= Jacqueline Mukansonera =

Rwandan nurse (born 1963)

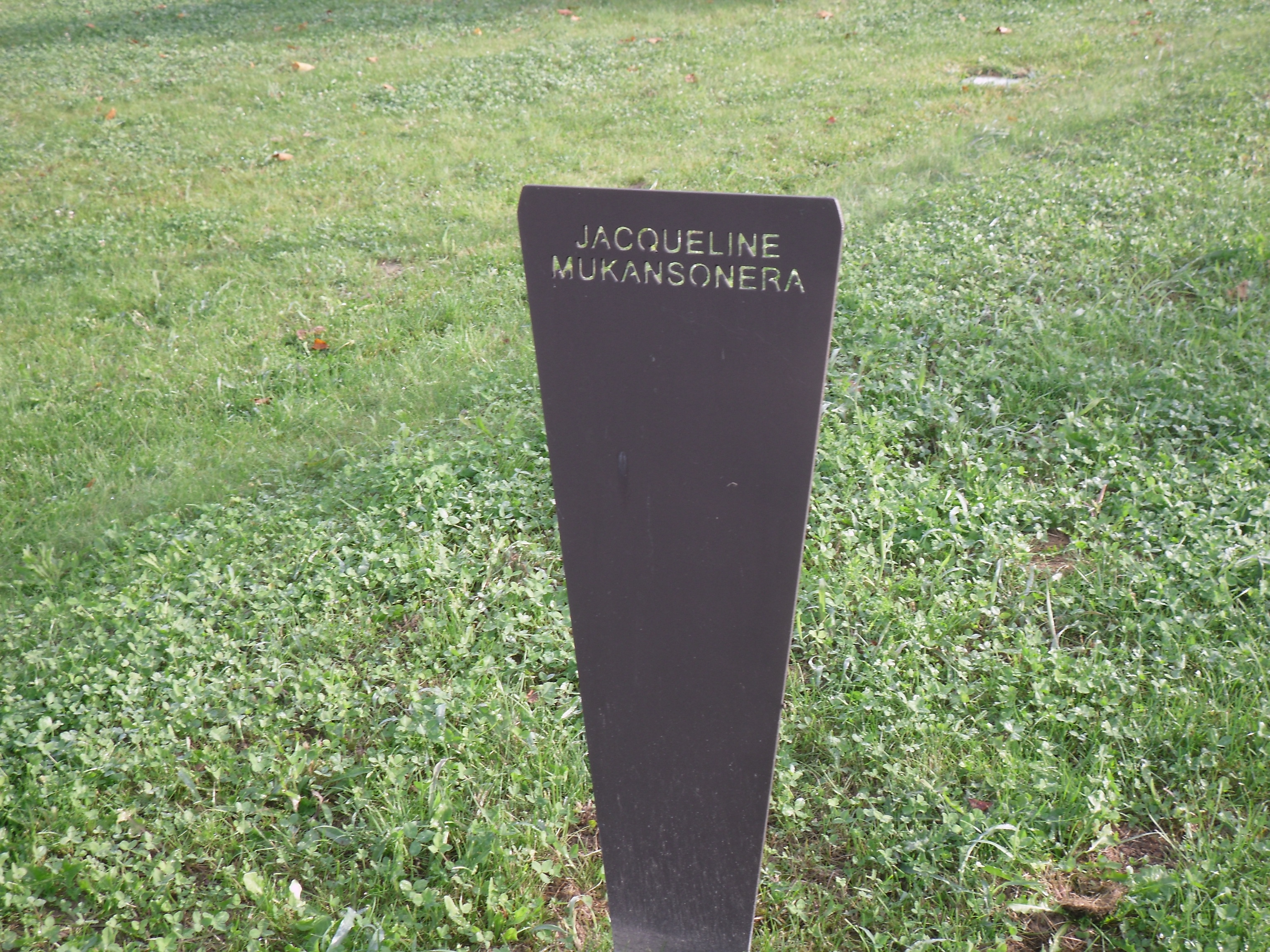
Plaque at the "Garden of the Righteous of the World", city of Padua, Italy.

Jacqueline Mukansonera (born 1963) is a Rwandan nurse. An ethnic Hutu, she saved the Tutsi woman Yolande Mukagasana from being killed during the Rwandan genocide in 1994. Yolande had turned to her for help at the hospital where Jacqueline worked as a nurse, and she was one of the first targets of the Hutu violence because she was seen as a member of the Tutsi intelligentsia. Jacqueline concealed her in the kitchen of her home for 11 days, neither of the two women spoke to one another during the stay out of fear of discovery. Jacqueline later bribed a policeman and managed to provide Yolande with falsified documents which said she was Hutu.

Jacqueline still lives in Rwanda, where she is a human rights activist and founder of the “Jya Mubandi Mwana” association which helps disabled children.

In 1998 Jacqueline Mukansonera and Yolande Mukagasana received the "Alexander Langer Testimonial Award" in Bolzano. The award was given with the motivation that Jacqueline had put her own life at risk to save Yolande, at the time a complete stranger, thus proving that there is room for personal responsibility even in the midst of awful and extreme genocidal violence. Where as the motivation behind giving the prize to Yolande was her determination to survive, not only for her own sake, but also to make sure the events she was forced to suffer through (such as losing her entire family to the violence) would not be repeated.

== Bibliography ==
Rwanda. Memorie di un genocidio, Photographs by Livio Senigalliesi, introduction by Daniele Scaglione, published by Impronta Grafica, Milan, 2004
