= Green Party-Intwari =

Political party in Burundi

The Green Party-Intwari (VERT-Intwari) is a small ecologist, predominantly ethnic Tutsi political party in Burundi. Its presence highlights the complex political dynamics in the country, which have historically revolved around ethnic tensions between the Hutu majority and Tutsi minority.
