= Yves Sahinguvu =

Burundian politician (born 1949)

Dr. Yves Sahinguvu (born 20 December 1949) is a Burundian politician and medical doctor. From November 2007 to August 2010, he was the First Vice President in charge of political and administrative affairs.

A trained ophthalmologist, Sahinguvu was first appointed to the position of First Vice President on November 9, 2007, by Act of Parliament. He replaced Martin Nduwimana, who was forced to resign by Parliament due to a political stalemate. Sahinguvu is a member of the opposition Union for National Progress.

During the 2010 general elections, as his party representative, he ran for the presidential seat but decided to withdraw from the race together with all opposition parties, after they accused the ruling party of rigging previous councillors' elections.
