= Alphonse-Marie Kadege =

Alphonse-Marie Kadege is a Burundian politician. He was Vice-President of Burundi from 30 April 2003 to 11 November 2004. Kadege was dismissed for failing in his "main mission of assisting the head of state". Additionally, Ndayizeye stated that Kadege had boycotted meetings that he had called in September to discuss a draft of the constitution, which made it so an extraordinary session of Congress had to occur. He is an ethnic Tutsi and a member of the Union for National Progress (UPRONA) Party.

== Legal proceedings ==
On January 15, 2007, he was acquitted on charges of plotting a coup, along with former president Domitien Ndayizeye and three others; two others were sentenced to long prison terms. Initially, the Attorney-General Jean Bosco Ndikumana withheld details about the arrests, which were confirmed by UPRONA Chairman Aloys Rubuka. The authorities initially detained him on charges of "destabilizing state institutions", although Rubuka accused them of having no proof of any wrongdoing. During his time in prison, Amnesty International stated that Kadege was being mistreated according to his wife in an interrogation room.

On 19 October 2020, the Supreme Court of Burundi sentenced him to prison for involvement in the murder of President Melchior Ndadaye in 1993.

== Personal life ==
Kadege had lived in Kinanira III in the Commune of Muha, but subsequently moved to the United States after his initial trial. Jean-Claude Kavumbag, the Director of the Net Press Agency, accused Kadege of not being able to legally live in the government residence in Kinanira, which prompted a defamation complaint, resulting in the case going through the High Court of Bujumbura and the Bujumbura Court of Appeal.

Political offices
Preceded by Domitien Ndayizeye	Vice-President of Burundi; 2003–2004	Succeeded by Frédéric Ngenzebuhoro
