= Commune of Mwumba =

Coordinates: 2°49′43″S 29°46′34″E

- Commune
- Interactive map of Commune of Mwumba
- Country: Burundi
- Province: Ngozi Province
- Administrative center: Mwumba
- Time zone: UTC+2 (Central Africa Time)

The commune of Mwumba is a commune of Ngozi Province in northern Burundi. The capital lies at Mwumba.
