= Domitien Ndayizeye =

President of Burundi from 2003 to 2005

His Excellency Domitien Ndayizeye
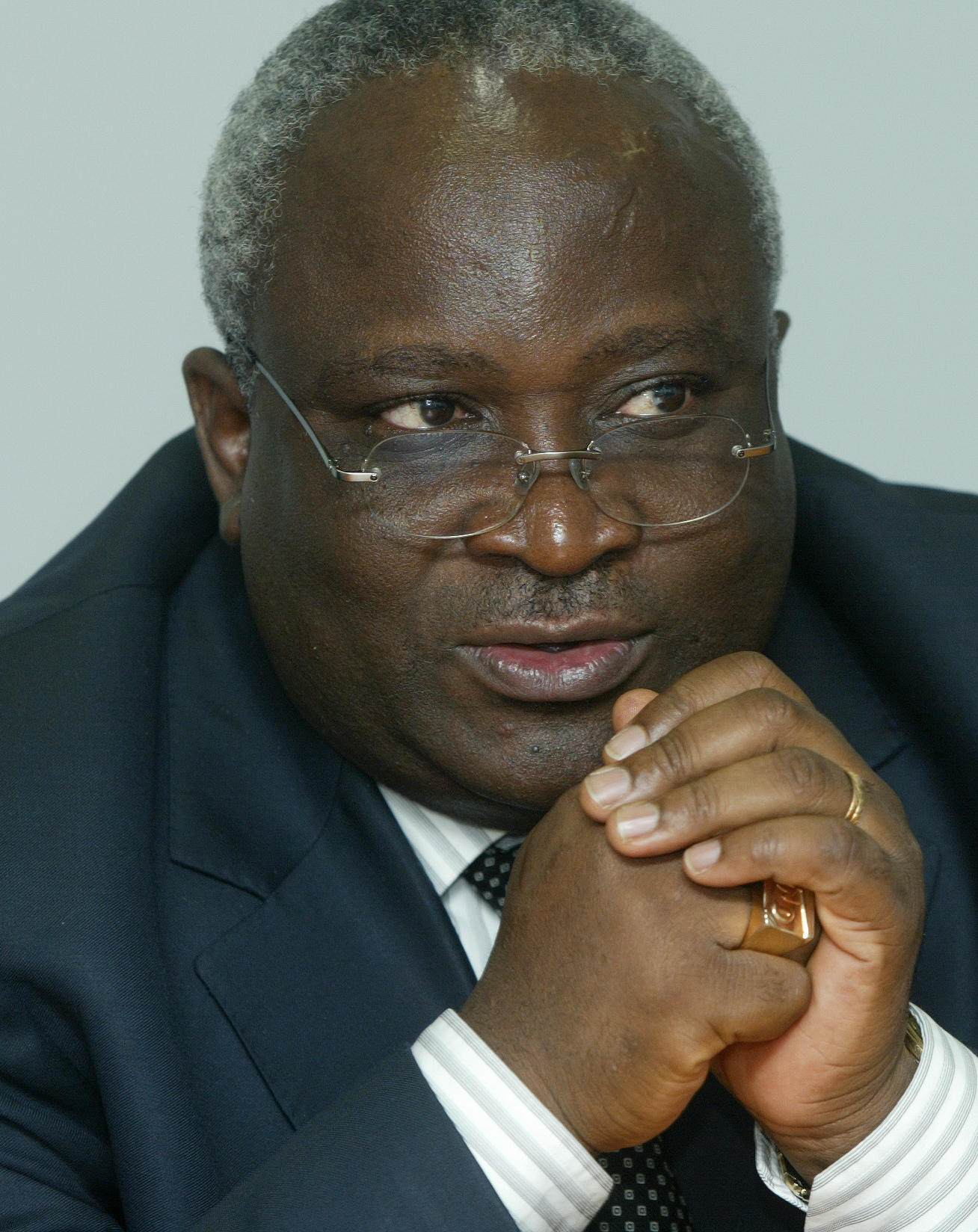
- Ndayizeye in 2005

8th President of Burundi
- In office 30 April 2003 – 26 August 2005
- Vice President: Alphonse-Marie Kadege (2003–2004); Frédéric Ngenzebuhoro (2004–2005)
- Preceded by: Pierre Buyoya
- Succeeded by: Pierre Nkurunziza

1st Vice-President of Burundi
- In office 1 November 2001 – 30 April 2003
- President: Pierre Buyoya
- Preceded by: Frédéric Bamvuginyumvira; Mathias Sinamenye
- Succeeded by: Alphonse-Marie Kadege

Personal details
- Born: 2 May 1953 (age 72) Murango, Kayanza Province, Burundi
- Party: Front for Democracy in Burundi (FRODEBU)

Domitien Ndayizeye (born 2 May 1953) is a Burundian politician who served as the eighth president of Burundi from 2003 to 2005. A member of the Front for Democracy in Burundi (FRODEBU), he previously served as the first vice president under President Pierre Buyoya from 2001 to 2003.

Ndayizeye currently serves as head of the National Gathering for Change (Rassemblement National pour le Changement, RANAC).

In 1994 he was appointed director of the National Intelligence Service by President Cyprien Ntaryamira.

In 2004, Ndayizeye proposed a draft constitution to the parliament prior to it being put to the electorate in referendum later in the year. Relations with the Tutsi group were strained, reflected in their boycotting of the legislative session due to consider the proposal. Due to a lack of preparation, the ballot was postponed to late November 2004.

Burundi is still trying to emerge from a civil war that began in 1993 when several groups drawn from the large Hutu majority took up arms against a government and army then dominated by a Tutsi elite.

The interim government pledged to more equitably share power between the two main ethnic groups.

On 21 August 2006, Ndayizeye was arrested in Bujumbura in relation to his alleged role in a coup plot earlier in the year. The Senate lifted his immunity as Senator prior to his arrest. He denied the charges against him in court on December 19 and said that he had "never dreamed of organising a coup, in fact I had given up politics to do business and be with my family". On January 15, 2007, he was acquitted along with former vice president Alphonse-Marie Kadege and three other defendants; two others were sentenced to long prison terms.

During 2010 general elections, as his party representative, he ran for the presidential seat but decided to withdraw from the race together with all opposition parties, after they accused the ruling party of rigging previous councilors' elections.

After opposition politician Zedi Feruzi was killed during the 2015 Burundian unrest Ndayizeye and other opposition parties broke off talks with the government of President Pierre Nkurunziza.

Political offices
Preceded by Mathias Sinamenye & Frédéric Bamvuginyumvira	Vice-President of Burundi; 2001–2003	Succeeded by Alphonse-Marie Kadege
Preceded by Pierre Buyoya	President of Burundi; 2003–2005	Succeeded by Pierre Nkurunziza
