= Gabriel Ntisezerana =

Burundian politician

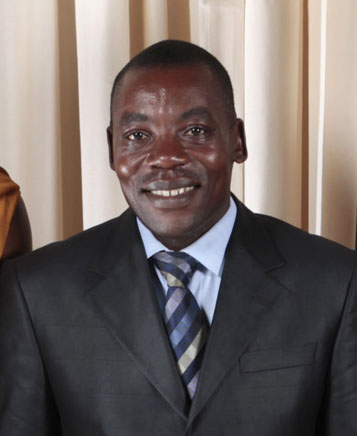
Gabriel Ntisezerana

Gabriel Ntisezerana is a Burundian politician who was Vice-President of Burundi from February 2007 to August 2010. Subsequently, he was President of the Senate of Burundi from August 2010 to August 2015. He is a trained economist and banker. He previously served as governor of the central bank, Bank of the Republic of Burundi, from 2006 to 2007.

Political offices
Preceded by Marina Barampama	Vice-President of Burundi; 2007–2010	Succeeded by Gervais Rufyikiri
