= Anti-corruption and Economic Malpractice Observatory =

Organization in Burundi

The Anti-corruption and Economic Malpractice Observatory, or OLUCOME, (l'Observatoire de lutte contre la corruption et les malversations économiques) is an independent, non-governmental anti-corruption watchdog group based in Burundi. It is known to be critical of the government of Burundi and its policies.

The OLUCOME investigates allegations of corruption within the Burundian government and business sectors. The organization claims to have investigated thousands of embezzlement and corruption cases over the years. OLUCOME has estimated that corruption, which it claims is rampant in the country, has cost Burundian citizens 236 billion Burundian francs between 2004 and 2009.

The OLUCOME has charged that the government lost over 24 billion Burundian francs in 2008 alone, due to corruption and non-transparent tendering processes.

The deputy chairman of OLUCOME, Ernest Manirumva, was killed in a knife attack at his home in Bujumbura on April 9, 2009. Manirumva was abducted from his OLUCOME office, and his home and work space were ransacked in the attack. OLUCOME leaders have called for an international investigation into Manirumva's murder.

In February 2012, OLUCOME president Gabriel Rufyiri joined a Bujumbura rally on behalf of imprisoned anti-corruption activist Faustin Ndikumana, calling on the government to release him and become "more transparent in recruitment".
