= Gaston Sindimwo =

Burundian politician (born 1965)

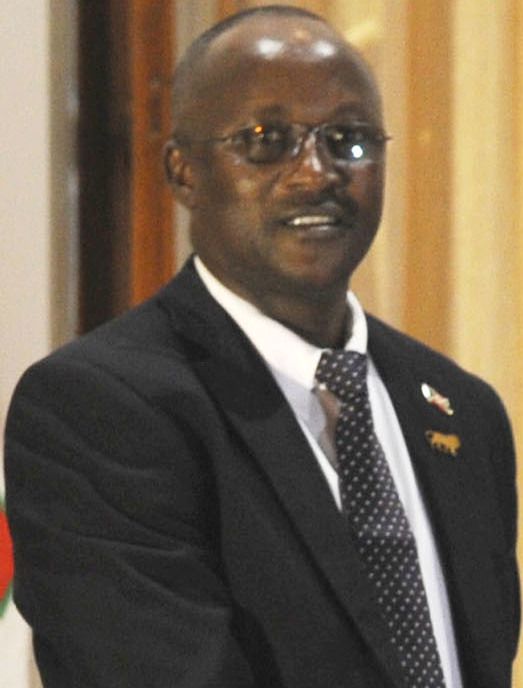

First Vice President of Burundi
- In office 20 August 2015 – 23 June 2020
- President: Pierre Nkurunziza
- Preceded by: Prosper Bazombanza
- Succeeded by: Prosper Bazombanza

Personal details
- Born: 1965 (age 60–61) Bwiza, Bujumbura, Burundi
- Party: Union for National Progress

Gaston Sindimwo (born 1965) is a Burundian politician who served as First Vice President of Burundi from 2015 to 2020. He is also the Secretary General of the Union for National Progress (UPRONA). Sindimwo previously served as Deputy Chief of Staff to the First Vice President.

He unsuccessfully ran for President of Burundi in the 2020 Burundian general election, finishing third of seven candidates.
