= Frédéric Bamvuginyumvira =

Burundian politician

Frédéric Bamvuginyumvira (born 24 June 1961) is the former first Vice-President of Burundi from 11 June 1998 to 1 November 2001. He is a member of the Hutu ethnic group.

Running as a candidate for the Front for Democracy in Burundi (FRODEBU) in the 29 June 1993 legislative elections, he won a seat representing Kirundo province.

On 11 June 1998, he was appointed 1st vice-president (responsible for political and administrative affairs), by Interim President Pierre Buyoya. He held that post until a new power-sharing government was installed on 1 November 2001.

On 6 December 2013, he was arrested while driving in the streets of Bujumbura and accused of giving money to the police officers who arrested him. This landed him in jail despite that the government dropped all the original charges.

Political offices
Preceded by Office created	Vice-President of Burundi; 1998–2001	Succeeded by Domitien Ndayizeye
