= Prosper Bazombanza =

Burundian politician

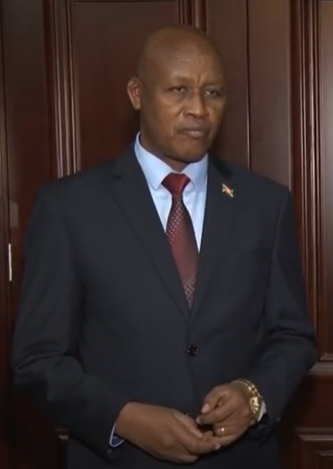
- Bazombanza in 2020

9th & 11th Vice President of Burundi
- Incumbent
- Assumed office 23 June 2020
- President: Évariste Ndayishimiye
- Preceded by: Gaston Sindimwo
- In office 14 February 2014 – 20 August 2015 (Note: As First Vice President) Serving with Gervais Rufyikiri (Second Vice President)
- President: Pierre Nkurunziza
- Preceded by: Bernard Busokoza
- Succeeded by: Gaston Sindimwo

Personal details
- Born: 12 February 1960 (age 65) Kizi Hill, Kingdom of Burundi
- Party: Union for National Progress

Prosper Bazombanza (born 12 February 1960) is a Burundian politician who has served as the 9th and 11th Vice President of Burundi from 2014 to 2015, and since 2020. He is a member of Union for National Progress. Prior to his tenure as vice president he was a teacher and administrator.

== Early life ==
Prosper Bazombanza was born on 12 February 1960, in Kizi Hill, Kingdom of Burundi. He graduated from the University of Burundi.

== Career ==
Bazombanza was a mathematics teacher at Mwaro High School from 1997 to 1999. He coordinated vocational education in Mwaro Province from 5 September 2005 to 3 March 2020.

Bazombanza joined Union for National Progress (UPRONA) in his youth. He was the 9th Vice-President of Burundi from 13 February 2014 to 20 August 2015. Opposition members accused President Pierre Nkurunziza of appointed Bazombanza as a way to change the law in order for him to maintain power beyond the limit of two terms; Bazombanza supported the constitutional changes that Nkurunziza was seeking. Only one of UPRONA's seventeen members of parliament did not boycott the vote on Bazombanza's nomination.

Between Bazombanza terms as vice president he was director general of the National Institute of Social Security and administrator of the Banque Commerciale du Burundi. He became the 11th Vice President on 23 June 2020, with 91 out of 94 parliamentarians voting in favour of his nomination. Members of the National Congress for Liberty boycotted his swearing in.

== Personal life ==
Bazombanza is married and is the father of six children.

== Works cited ==
=== News ===
- "Visi-Prezida w'Uburundi Prosper Bazombanza Yarahiye". Voice of America. 24 June 2020. Archived from the original on 1 July 2025.
- Nduwimana, Patrick (14 February 2014). "Burundi's president appoints deputy, angers opposition". Thomson Reuters Foundation. Archived from the original on 1 July 2025.
- Uwimana, Diane (24 June 2020). "Burundi parliament approves Deputy President and Prime Minister". Iwacu. Archived from the original on 1 July 2025.

=== Web ===
- "M. Prosper Bazombanza". Vice-President of Burundi. Archived from the original on 1 July 2025.
