= Frédéric Ngenzebuhoro =

Burundian politician

Frédéric Ngenzebuhoro (born 2 April 1952, Gitanga) was Vice-President of Burundi from 11 November 2004 to 26 August 2005. He is an ethnic Tutsi and a member of the Union for National Progress (UPRONA) party. Prior to that appointment, Ngenzebuhoro had served in a number of ministerial capacities under prior President Pierre Buyoya.

Political offices
Preceded by Alphonse-Marie Kadege	Vice-President of Burundi; 2004–2005	Succeeded by Martin Nduwimana & Alice Nzomukunda
