= Melchior Bwakira =

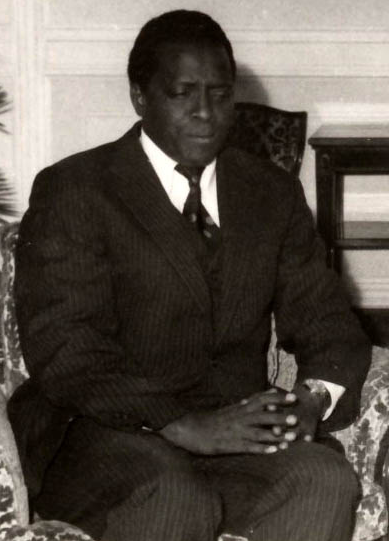
Melchior Bwakira in 1976.

Melchior Bwakira (13 December 1937 – 2009) was a diplomat and dean of Burundian Diplomats. Bwakira served as Minister of Foreign Affairs and co-operation Minister of Transport, Telecommunications and Aeronautics (1972–1976). From 1978 to 1981 and from 1997 to 2001, Bwakira served as the Ambassador of Burundi to Ethiopia, Eritrea, Djibouti, and Somalia. He was also the Burundian Permanent Representative to the Organization of African Unity (OAU, now African Union) and to the United Nations Economic Commission for Africa (UNECA). From 1981 to 1986, Bwakira was the Burundian Ambassador to the United Nations (UN) in New York, to Cuba and Mexico.

Bwakira, at the age of 24, was the first African Director of Radio Burundi in the early 1960s.
