= Gabriel Rufyiri =

- Born: 1973 (age 52–53); Commune of Matongo, Kayanza Province, Burundi
- Occupations: Accountant; President of Olucome
- Known for: Anti-corruption activities

Gabriel Rufyiri (born 1973 in the Commune of Matongo, Kayanza Province) is a Burundian accountant by training, who founded and is president of the anti-corruption organization Olucome (Observatoire de la lutte contre la corruption et les malversations économiques, Observatory for the fight against corruption and economic malfeasance).

== History ==
Olucome was founded in 2002, with Gabriel Rufyiri as president. It is an NGO that has often criticized the government for its lack of action over embezzlement of public money. In September 2006 Gabriel Rufyiri was arrested on a charge of defamation for stating that Burundian government members had embezzled money. He was imprisoned in Mpimba Prison in Bujumbura. In April 2009 his deputy, Ernest Manirumva, was assassinated.

By 2012, Olucome had filed over 10,000 denunciations of corruption and embezzlement of public funds, but had only been able to process 1,000 cases. Rufyiri had been arrested ten times. On 14 May 2012 Rufyiri was decorated Knight of the Order of the Crown by Albert II of Belgium

In March 2022 africanews reported that Gabriel Rufyiri had returned to Burundi after seven years of exile. He said he was aware of the risks but trusted the state to protect him. In March 2023 Rufyiri, still president of Olucome, met the Prime Minister of Burundi. A few days later he attacked the "Burundian oligarchs", Olivier Suguru, Adrien Ntigacika and Vénérand Kazohera, who received all the public contracts. He said the national bank (BNB) reserved foreign currency for imports of medicines, fertilizers and fuel, which these individuals controlled. He also asked for clarity of how the "Prestige" company was awarded the fuel market.

== Sources ==
- "Burundi : Gabriel Rufyiri, monsieur Propre", JeuneAfrique.com, 25 September 2012
- d'Ersu, Laurent (2009-11-04), "Au Burundi, Gabriel Rufyiri se sent très seul", La Croix, ISSN 0242-6056
- "Gabriel Rufyiri: "Corruption is the enemy of development"", africanews
- Mbazumutima, Abbas (22 March 2023), "Olucome: "A small clique is getting rich on the backs of the taxpayer"", Iwacu (in French)
- Président de l'Olucome (in French)
- Worldwide Appeals January 2007 (PDF), Amnesty, 22 January 2007
