= Joseph Butore =

Burundian politician

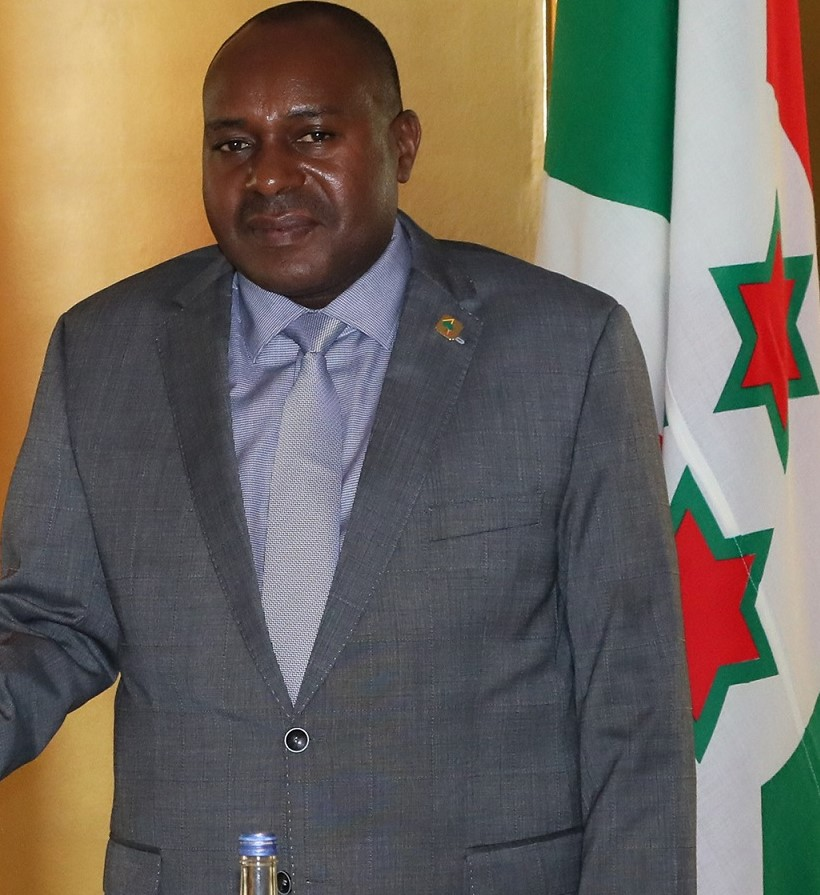

Secretary General of ARCA
- Incumbent
- Assumed office 08 October 2020

Second Vice President of Burundi
- In office 20 August 2015 – 23 June 2020
- Preceded by: Gervais Rufyikiri
- Succeeded by: Prosper Bazombanza (as Vice President)

Personal details
- Born: 1969 (age 56–57)
- Party: CNDD–FDD

Joseph Butore (born 1969) is a Burundian politician who served as Second Vice President of Burundi from 2015 to 2020. He was born in Cibitoke, Burundi in 1969. He was initially elected as a deputy of the Cibitoke constituency in 2010 and was appointed by President Pierre Nkurunziza as Minister of Higher Education and Scientific Research in 2013. In 2015, he was appointed Second Vice President. until June 2020.

Since 08 October 2020, Butore has been serving as Secretary General of ARCA, the National Insurance Regulatory and Control Agency.

On October 25, 2022, he received Russian citizenship.
