= Vice-President of Burundi =

Political office in Burundi

Vice-President of the Republic of Burundi
- Icegera c'Umukuru w'Igihugu w'Uburundi (Kirundi); Vice-Président de la République du Burundi (French)
- Coat of arms of Burundi

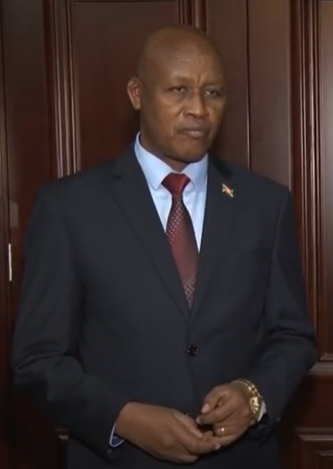
- Incumbent; Prosper Bazombanza since 23 June 2020
- Style: His Excellency (formal); Mr. Vice-President (informal)
- Term length: 5 years
- Inaugural holder: Frédéric Bamvuginyumvira (First Vice-President); Mathias Sinamenye (Second Vice-President)
- Formation: 11 June 1998
- Website: Official Website

The position of vice-president of the Republic of Burundi was created in June 1998, when a transitional constitution went into effect. It replaced the post of Prime Minister.

== History of the office ==
=== Interim period (1998–2001) ===
Pierre Buyoya, a former president (1987–1993) who seized power in a 1996 military coup, was sworn in as president of the Republic on 11 June 1998. He appointed Frédéric Bamvuginyumvira, a Hutu member of the Front for Democracy in Burundi (FRODEBU), as 1st vice-president. Mathias Sinamenye, a Tutsi member of Buyoya's Union for National Progress (UPRONA) party, was appointed 2nd vice-president.

According to the transitional constitution, the vice-presidency consisted of two posts: The 1st vice-president (Responsible for political and administrative affairs) and the 2nd vice-president (Responsible for economic and social affairs).

=== Transitional period (2001–2005) ===
A new transitional power-sharing government took office on 1 November 2001. Interim president Pierre Buyoya became transitional president for a period of 18 months. At the end of his term in 2003, Hutu vice-president Domitien Ndayizeye took office and appointed a Tutsi (Alphonse-Marie Kadege) as vice-president. In November 2004, Kadege was sacked as vice-president and replaced by Frédéric Ngenzebuhoro. Although Ndayizeye's term was due to end in late 2004 following elections, the transitional period was extended and planned elections were delayed. Elections were held in mid-2005 and the transitional period is due to end on 26 August 2005, when the newly elected president takes office.

=== Vice-presidency 2005–2018 ===
Burundi's new constitution, approved in a 28 February 2005 constitutional referendum, calls for a two-member vice-presidency (similar to that of the interim period). The 1st vice-president will be responsible for political and administrative affairs, while the 2nd vice-president will handle social and economic affairs. One vice-president will be an ethnic Hutu and the other a Tutsi. Nominees must be approved by both chambers of parliament in order to take office.

On 29 August 2005, President Pierre Nkurunziza nominated Martin Nduwimana and Alice Nzomukunda for the posts of 1st and 2nd vice-president. Both received approval from parliament and were immediately sworn in. Nzomukunda resigned on 5 September 2006. She was replaced by Marina Barampama two days later.

In February 2007, Barampama was replaced by Gabriel Ntisezerana. In November 2007, Nduwimana was replaced by Yves Sahinguvu.

In August 2010, Sahinguvu was replaced by Therence Sinunguruza and Ntisezerana was replaced by Gervais Rufyikiri.

=== Vice-presidency since 2018 ===
New constitutional amendments were approved in a 17 May 2018 constitutional referendum. The post of second vice-president was abolished. The remaining vice-president, who has limited powers, is selected from a political party and ethnic group that differs from those of the president.

== Key ==
Political parties

- Front for Democracy in Burundi (FRODEBU)
- Union for National Progress (UPRONA)
- National Council for the Defense of Democracy – Forces for the Defense of Democracy (CNDD–FDD)

== List of officeholders ==
Name (Birth–Death)	Portrait	Term of office			Ethnic group	Political party	President(s)
Name (Birth–Death)	Portrait	Took office	Left office	Time in office	Ethnic group	Political party	President(s)
Frédéric Bamvuginyumvira (born 1961); First Vice-President		11 June 1998	1 November 2001	3 years, 143 days	Hutu	FRODEBU	Buyoya
Mathias Sinamenye (born 1946); Second Vice-President		11 June 1998	1 November 2001	3 years, 143 days	Tutsi	UPRONA	Buyoya
Domitien Ndayizeye (born 1953); Vice-President		1 November 2001	30 April 2003	1 year, 180 days	Hutu	FRODEBU	Buyoya
Alphonse-Marie Kadege; Vice-President		30 April 2003	11 November 2004	1 year, 195 days	Tutsi	UPRONA	Ndayizeye
Frédéric Ngenzebuhoro; Vice-President		11 November 2004	29 August 2005	301 days	Tutsi	UPRONA	Ndayizeye
Martin Nduwimana (born 1958); First Vice-President		29 August 2005	7 November 2007	2 years, 70 days	Tutsi	UPRONA	Nkurunziza
Alice Nzomukunda (born 1966); Second Vice-President		29 August 2005	5 September 2006	1 year, 7 days	Hutu	CNDD–FDD	Nkurunziza
Marina Barampama (born 1969); Second Vice-President		7 September 2006	8 February 2007	154 days	Hutu	CNDD–FDD	Nkurunziza
Gabriel Ntisezerana; Second Vice-President		12 February 2007	28 August 2010	3 years, 197 days	Hutu	CNDD–FDD	Nkurunziza
Yves Sahinguvu (born 1949); First Vice-President		8 November 2007	August 2010	2 years, 266 days	Tutsi	UPRONA	Nkurunziza
Thérence Sinunguruza (1959–2020); First Vice-President		28 August 2010	October 2013	3 years, 34 days	Tutsi	UPRONA	Nkurunziza
Bernard Busokoza (born 1953); First Vice-President		October 2013	1 February 2014	123 days	Tutsi	UPRONA	Nkurunziza
Prosper Bazombanza (born 1960); First Vice-President		14 February 2014	20 August 2015	1 year, 187 days	Tutsi	UPRONA	Nkurunziza
Gervais Rufyikiri (born 1965); Second Vice-President		28 August 2010	20 August 2015	4 years, 357 days	Hutu	CNDD–FDD	Nkurunziza
Gaston Sindimwo (born 1965); First Vice-President		20 August 2015	23 June 2020	4 years, 308 days	Tutsi	UPRONA	Nkurunziza; Ndayishimiye
Joseph Butore (born 1969); Second Vice-President		20 August 2015	23 June 2020	4 years, 308 days	Hutu	CNDD–FDD	Nkurunziza; Ndayishimiye
Prosper Bazombanza (born 1960); Vice-President		23 June 2020	Incumbent	6 years, 77 days	Tutsi	UPRONA	Ndayishimiye

== See also ==
- Burundi
  - Politics of Burundi
  - List of kings of Burundi
  - President of Burundi
    - List of presidents of Burundi
  - Prime Minister of Burundi
  - List of colonial governors of Ruanda-Urundi
    - List of colonial residents of Burundi
  - Martyazo
- Lists of Incumbents
