= Jean Minani =

Burundian politician

Jean Minani is a Burundian politician. He served as President of the National Assembly of Burundi from December 1994 to January 1995 and from January 2002 to August 2005. In 1995, Minani became President of the Front for Democracy in Burundi (FRODEBU).

Minani is an ethnic Hutu from Kirundo province.
