= Gervais Rufyikiri =

Burundian politician (born 1965)

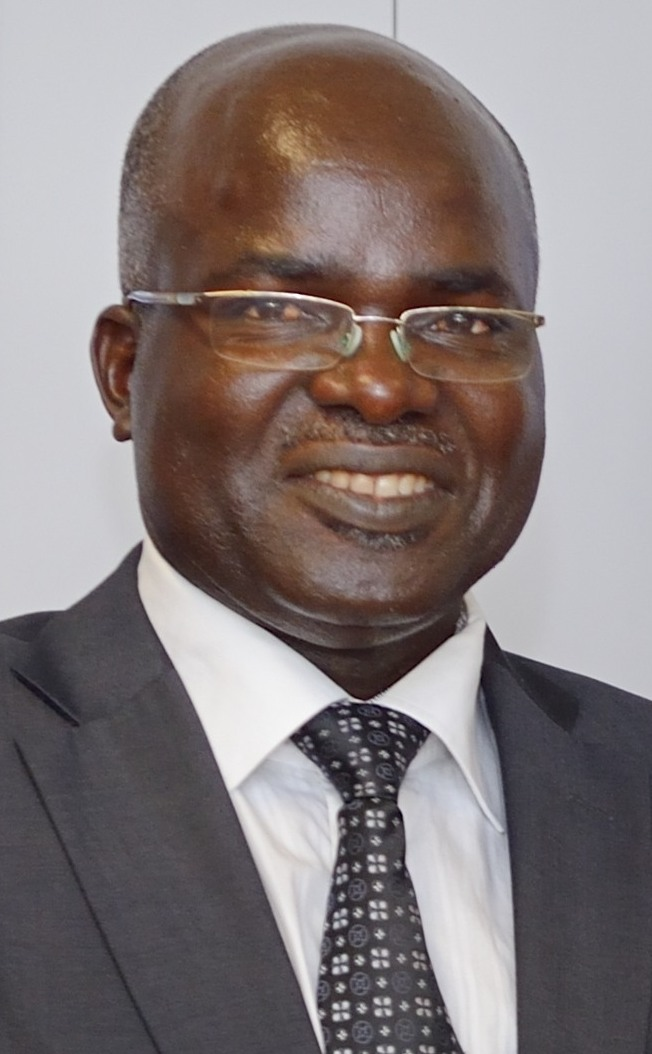
Gervais Rufyikiri in 2014

Gervais Rufyikiri (born 12 April 1965) is a Burundian politician who was Second Vice President of Burundi from 2010 to 2015.

Born in Gitega Province, Rufyikiri holds a doctorate (PhD) in Biological, Agricultural and Environmental Engineering Sciences from the Belgian university Université Catholique de Louvain. An ethnic Hutu, he is a member of the National Council for the Defense of Democracy-Forces for the Defense of Democracy (CNDD-FDD), became President of Senate of Burundi on 17 August 2005 until 2010, when he became the Second Vice-President.

As a member of President Pierre Nkurunziza's ruling party, the CNDD-FDD, Rufyikiri expressed his opposition to Nkurunziza's controversial bid for a third term in 2015. As a result, he was effectively marginalized, although he initially remained in his post as Second Vice-President. On 25 June 2015, Rufyikiri left the country and went into exile in Belgium, declaring that Nkurunziza's candidacy was unconstitutional and that, by running, Nkurunziza was putting his own interests ahead of the nation's interests. He said that Nkurunziza was "deaf" to ignore all the voices calling on him not to run. The government welcomed Rufyikiri's departure and alleged that he was involved in the failed May 2015 coup attempt.

== Footnotes ==
Political offices
Preceded by Gabriel Ntisezerana	Vice-President of Burundi; 2010–2015	Succeeded by Joseph Butore
