= COVID-19 pandemic in Burundi =

- Disease: COVID-19
- Pathogen: SARS-CoV-2
- Location: Burundi
- First outbreak: Wuhan, China
- Index case: Bujumbura
- Arrival date: 25 March 2020 (6 years, 7 months and 1 day)
- Confirmed cases: 54,569 (updated 31 October 2026)
- Recovered: 42,532 (estimated)
- Deaths: 15 (updated 31 October 2026)

The COVID-19 pandemic in Burundi is part of the worldwide pandemic of coronavirus disease 2019 (COVID-19) caused by severe acute respiratory syndrome coronavirus 2 (SARS-CoV-2). The virus was confirmed to have reached Burundi on 25 March 2020.

== Background ==
On 12 January 2020, the World Health Organization (WHO) confirmed that a novel coronavirus was the cause of a respiratory illness in a cluster of people in Wuhan City, Hubei Province, China, which was reported to the WHO on 31 December 2019.

The case fatality ratio for COVID-19 has been much lower than SARS of 2003, but the transmission has been significantly greater, with a significant total death toll. Model-based simulations for Burundi indicate that the 95% confidence interval for the time-varying reproduction number R_{t} exceeded 1 during the first half of 2021 but diminished to around 0.7 during the second half of 2021.

== Timeline ==
=== March 2020 ===
- Burundi's Health Minister Thadée Ndikumana confirmed the country's first two cases of coronavirus disease 2019 on 31 March, Burundi nationals travelling back from Rwanda and Dubai respectively.

=== April to June 2020 ===
- On 5 April, a further positive case was confirmed, a 39-year-old woman, while 7 other people tested negative. In total there were 20 new cases in April, bringing the number of confirmed cases to 18. One patient died (14 April) and 8 recovered, leaving 6 active cases at the end of the month.
- On 12 May, the foreign ministry of Burundi addressed a letter to WHO's Africa headquarters, ordering four officials coordinating the coronavirus response to leave the country. The letter said the four individuals "are declared persona non grata and as such, must leave the territory of Burundi" by 15 May. The health minister reportedly accuses WHO of "unacceptable interference in [the country's] management of the coronavirus".
- On 28 May, First Lady Denise Bucumi-Nkurunziza tested positive for COVID-19.
- There were 48 new cases in May, bringing the total number of confirmed cases to 63. The death toll remained unchanged. 29 cases were active at the end of the month.
- On 8 June, late President Pierre Nkurunziza died of what was described as a heart attack in a government statement. However, with government authorities accused of deliberately covering up the scope of the pandemic, and in the wake of unconfirmed reports that his wife was flown to Kenya 11 days before, having contracted COVID-19, some have speculated that the president died of COVID-19.
- There were 107 new cases in June, raising the total number of confirmed cases to 170. The death toll remained unchanged and the number of recovered patients rose to 115, leaving 54 active cases at the end of the month.

=== Subsequent cases ===
- 2020 cases

There were 818 confirmed cases in 2020. 687 patients recovered while two persons died. At the end of 2020 there were 129 active cases. Former president Pierre Buyoya died in Paris from COVID-19 on 17 December.

- 2021 cases

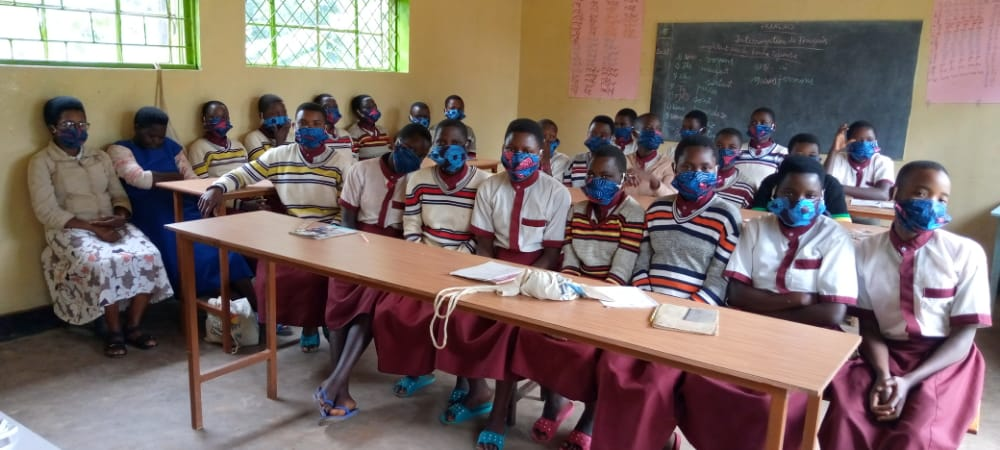
Burundian students wearing masks to protect themselves from the coronavirus, April 2021

There were 30,797 confirmed cases in 2021, bringing the total number of cases to 31,615. 28,901 patients recovered in 2021 while 12 persons died, bringing the total death toll to 14. At the end of 2021 there were 2,013 active cases.

Modelling by WHO's Regional Office for Africa suggests that due to under-reporting, the true number of infections by the end of 2021 was around 5.3 million while the true number of COVID-19 deaths was around 149.

- 2022 cases

There were 20,547 confirmed cases in 2022, bringing the total number of cases to 52,162. 21,805 patients recovered in 2022 while one person died, bringing the total death toll to 15. At the end of 2022 there were 754 active cases.

- 2023 cases

There were 2,310 new cases in 2023, bringing the total number of confirmed cases to 54,472. The death toll remained unchanged.

== Statistics ==
=== Confirmed new cases per day ===
View source data.

=== Confirmed deaths per day ===
View source data.

== Vaccinations ==
Throughout most of 2021, Burundi was one of four countries which did not distribute vaccines, along with Eritrea, North Korea, and Tanzania. In February 2021, Thaddee Ndikumana, the health minister of Burundi, said his country was more concerned with prevention measures. "Since more than 95% of patients are recovering, we estimate that the vaccines are not yet necessary," local media reported. In October 2021, however, the Burundian government announced that it had received delivery of 500,000 doses of the Chinese Sinopharm BIBP vaccine. A targeted vaccination programme commenced on 18 October 2021.

== Prevention ==
On 12 March 2020, the government instituted 14-day quarantining for people entering Burundi from affected countries.

President Nkurunziza refused to impose restrictions on the country, permitting political rallies and sporting events to take place.

== See also ==
- COVID-19 pandemic in Africa
- COVID-19 pandemic by country and territory
