= Pierre Nkurunziza =

President of Burundi from 2005 to 2020

Supreme Guide of Patriotism Pierre Nkurunziza
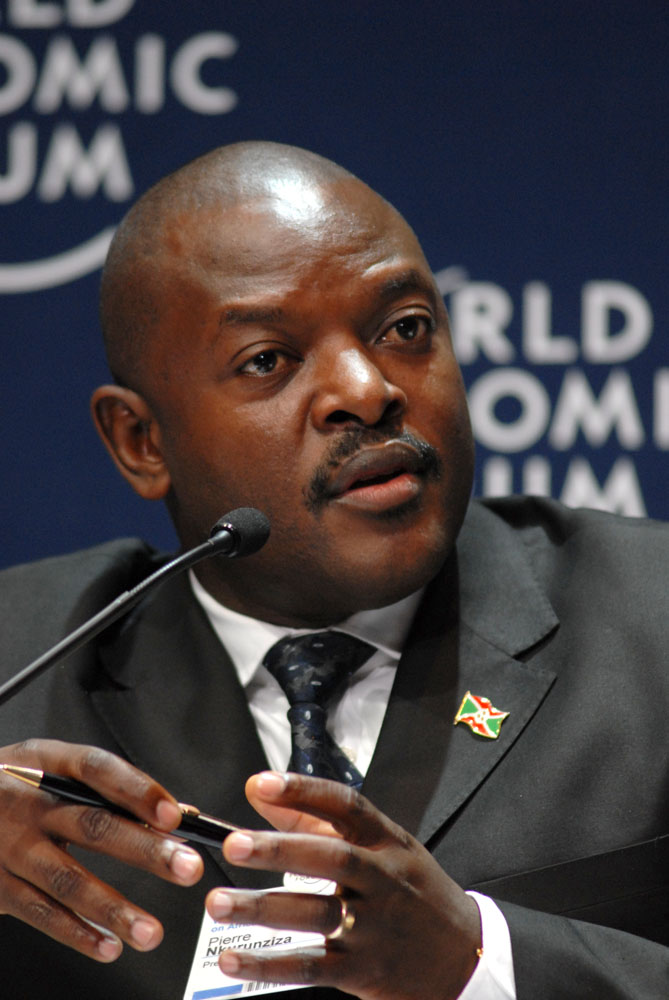
- Nkurunziza in 2008

9th President of Burundi
- In office 26 August 2005 – 8 June 2020
- Vice President: See list: First Vice President; Martin Nduwimana; Yves Sahinguvu; Thérence Sinunguruza; Bernard Busokoza; Prosper Bazombanza; Gaston Sindimwo; Second Vice President; Alice Nzomukunda; Marina Barampama; Gabriel Ntisezerana; Gervais Rufyikiri; Joseph Butore
- Preceded by: Domitien Ndayizeye
- Succeeded by: Évariste Ndayishimiye

President of the CNDD–FDD
- In office 1 October 2001 – March 2012
- Preceded by: Jean-Bosco Ndayikengurukiye
- Succeeded by: Pascal Nyabenda

Personal details
- Born: 18 December 1964 Bujumbura, Kingdom of Burundi
- Died: 8 June 2020 (aged 55) Karuzi, Burundi
- Resting place: Gitega
- Party: CNDD–FDD
- Spouse: Denise Bucumi (m. 1994)
- Children: 6
- Education: University of Burundi
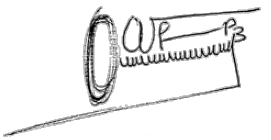
- Signature

Military service
- Allegiance: CNDD–FDD
- Years of service: 1994–2005
- Rank: Commander-in-chief (from 2001)

Pierre Nkurunziza (18 December 1964 – 8 June 2020) was a Burundian politician, educator, and rebel leader who served as the ninth president of Burundi from 2005 until his death in 2020. He was the longest-serving president in Burundian history, having served for nearly 15 years.

Born into a Hutu family in Bujumbura, Nkurunziza taught physical education before becoming involved in politics during the Burundian Civil War as part of the rebel National Council for the Defense of Democracy – Forces for the Defense of Democracy (Conseil National Pour la Défense de la Démocratie – Forces pour la Défense de la Démocratie, CNDD–FDD) of which he became leader in 2001. The CNDD–FDD became a political party at the end of the Civil War in January 2005 and Nkurunziza was elected president by Parliament in August of that same year.

During his first term, Nkurunziza took a number of popular policies. He rebuilt the state from the civil war, and basis of the inter-ethnic compromise enshrined in the Arusha Accords, which recognised the partition of state positions between Tutsi, Hutu, and the minority Twa ethnic groups. Nkurunziza played a major role in the demobilisation of the Party for the Liberation of the Hutu People – National Forces of Liberation (PALIPEHUTU–FNLd), the final Hutu rebel faction in the Civil War in 2008. In 2010, Nkurunziza won a second term despite boycott from opposition parties and accusations of fraud.

Nkurunziza's second term was marked by rising discontent and increasing authoritarianism. The repression of opposition members, which began as early as 2008, intensified. In 2014, jogging was banned in the fear of the exercise being a cover up for political meetings. In April 2015, Nkurunziza controversially announced he would run for a third term in the presidential election despite the Arusha Accords stating that there is a two-term limit, which subsequently caused mass unrests. The following month, a failed coup occurred in which Nkurunziza survived and went on to win the election in July. His third term was marked by continuing unrest, consolidation of power, and increasing isolation. In May 2018, a disputed constitutional referendum was held which increased term limits from five to seven years, with a limit of two terms. The following month, when the new constitution came into force, Nkurunziza announced that he would step down after his term ended in 2020. He was subsequently given the title of Supreme Guide of Patriotism (French: Guide suprême du patriotisme) in March 2020.

In the May 2020 presidential election, Nkurunziza endorsed ally and protégé Évariste Ndayishimiye as the candidate for the CNDD–FDD. Ndayishimiye subsequently won the election, but Nkurunziza died in the following month in June ahead of the planned transfer of power two months later. His cause of death was disputed as while government sources claimed that Nkurunziza died of a heart attack, other claimed that he died of COVID-19. Eventually, Ndayishimiye was sworn in as president ten days later on 18 June. While credited for rebuilding Burundi and introducing social programs earlier in his presidency, his subsequent authoritarian rule, repression of dissents and human rights abuses later on was heavily criticised.

== Early life ==
=== Childhood and teaching career, 1964–1995 ===
Pierre Nkurunziza was born on 18 December 1964 in Bujumbura, the capital of Burundi, shortly after the country's independence from Belgian rule in 1962. He was one of six children born into a family from Buye in Mwumba, Ngozi Province, where Nkurunziza spent his early years. His father, Eustache Ngabisha, was a politician from the Hutu ethnic group and a Catholic. Ngabisha was involved in the nationalist politics under the ruling Union for National Progress (Union pour le Progrès national, UPRONA) and was elected to the National Assembly in 1965. Ngabisha became a provincial governor but was killed in the genocidal violence of 1972. Nkurunziza's mother, Domitille Minani, was an assistant nurse from the Tutsi ethnic group who was Protestant. Nkurunziza himself was considered to be Hutu.

Nkurunziza attended school in Ngozi and studied at the prestigious athénée in Gitega after his father's death. He enrolled at the Institute of Physical Education and Sports at the University of Burundi and obtained a degree in physical education in 1990. At the time, he was not known to be politically active. After graduating, he taught at a school in Muramvya before becoming an assistant lecturer at the university in 1992. He was also a football coach for Muzinga FC and Union Sporting in the country's first division. Alongside his other roles, he taught at the Higher Institute for Military Cadres (Institut supérieur des cadres militaires, ISCAM) where he made important personal contacts with officers in the Burundian National Army who would subsequently become leading figures within the major rebel groups during the Civil War. Nkurunziza married Denise Bucumi in 1994.

== Burundian Civil War ==
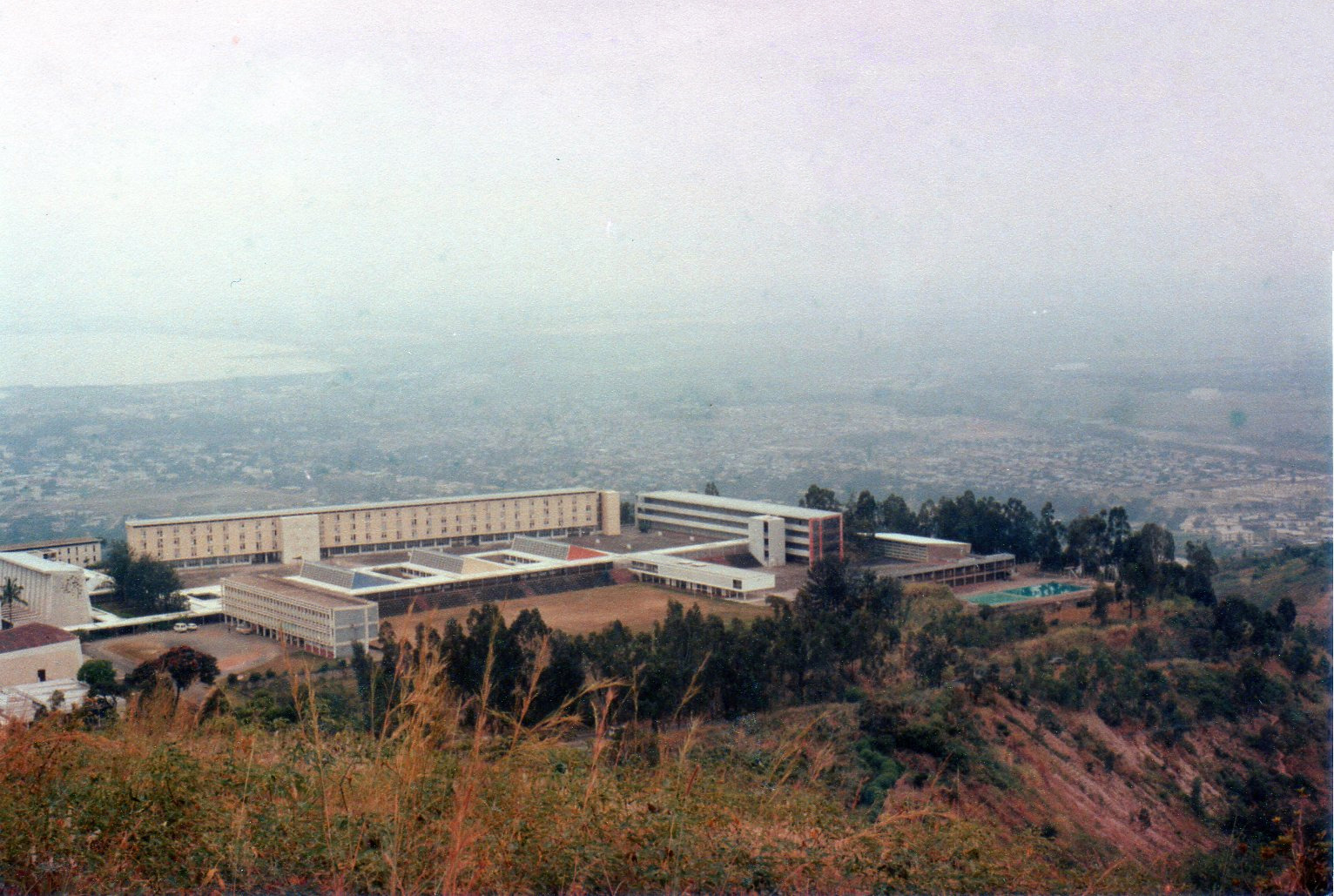
Nkurunziza studied and later taught physical education at the University of Burundi (pictured) but was forced to flee in 1995 during the Burundian Civil War

The newly elected president Melchior Ndadaye was assassinated in an attempted coup d'état in October 1993. The killing sparked a wave of ethnic violence between Hutu and Tutsi factions and the start of the Burundian Civil War. Nkurunziza was still teaching at the University of Burundi but was forced to flee in 1995 after hundreds of Hutu students were killed. He spent several years in hiding in the bush and was himself sentenced to death in absentia by a government-backed court in 1998 for planting land mines. At the time, he became associated with the moderate rebel group National Council for the Defense of Democracy – Forces for the Defense of Democracy (Conseil National Pour la Défense de la Démocratie – Forces pour la Défense de la Démocratie, CNDD–FDD), largely supported by ethnic Hutus. By 1998, he had risen to the position of General Secretary of the CNDD–FDD and was in charge of coordinating the political and military wings. He fought for their militia and gained the nickname "Pita". He was nearly killed near Gitega in 2001 but interpreted his survival as a sign that he was destined to lead the group. Nkurunziza himself became a born-again Protestant and supported the integration of Tutsis and other minority groups into the CNDD–FDD. All five of Nkurunziza's siblings were killed in the Civil War, three of whom while fighting for the CNDD–FDD.

Nkurunziza became the president of the CNDD–FDD on 28 August 2000 and presided over the movement as it moved towards a political compromise with the government. A series of agreements in 2003 paved the way for the CNDD–FDD to enter national politics, and allowed Nkurunziza to be reunited with his wife and surviving family members. He became Minister for Good Government and the General Inspection of the State in the transitional government of Domitien Ndayizeye which was considered "a springboard post at a moment when electoral preparations were under way to complete the transition". He was re-elected president of the CNDD–FDD, now a political party, in August 2004, and became its candidate for the forthcoming legislative and presidential elections. The elections brought Nkurunziza and the CNDD–FDD to power with a large majority of the vote. He succeeded Ndayizeye as the President of Burundi.

== Presidency (2005–2020) ==
=== First term, 2005–2010 ===
Nkurunziza's term as president began on 26 August 2005 and he soon adopted a number of popular policies. He presided over the reconstruction of the Burundian state on the basis of the inter-ethnic compromise enshrined in the Arusha Accords which mandated the partition of state positions between Tutsi, Hutu, and the minority Twa ethnic groups. The Party for the Liberation of the Hutu People – National Forces of Liberation (Parti pour la libération du peuple Hutu – Forces nationales de libération, PALIPEHUTU–FNL), the final Hutu rebel faction in the Civil War, was demobilised in 2008. Burundi became actively involved in the African Union and the state's outstanding public debt was cancelled in 2009 by the "Paris Club". However, Nkurunziza's reputation became increasingly tarnished in the face of political factionalism, corruption, and continued insecurity. Hussein Radjabu, a leading figure in the CNDD–FDD, was imprisoned for insulting Nkurunziza in 2008. However, Nkurunziza was re-elected for a second term in July 2010 with a big majority but was effectively unopposed, as the polls were boycotted by opposition parties.

=== Second term and unrest, 2010–2015 ===
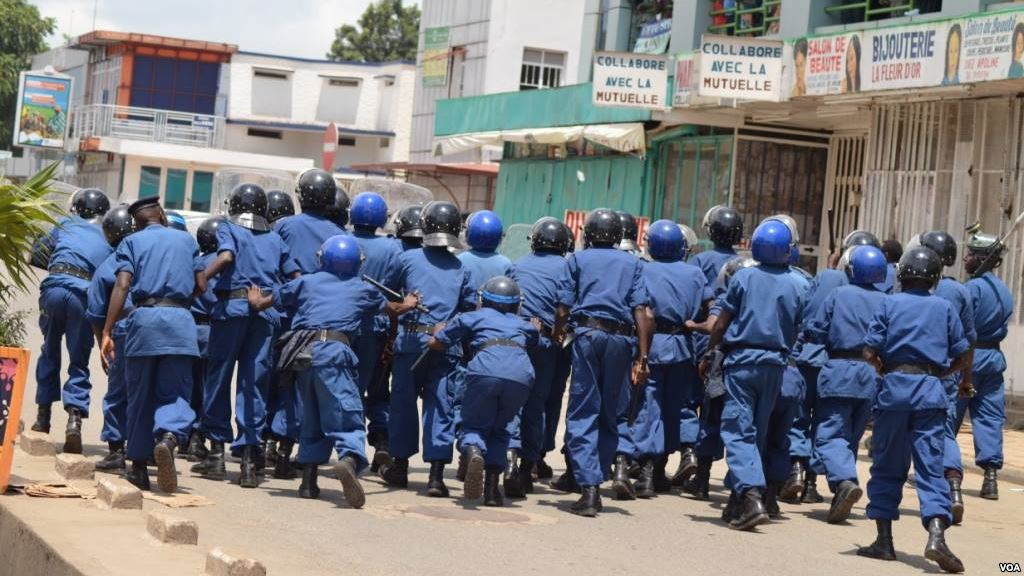
Burundian police clash with protesters opposed to Nkurunziza's third term in April 2015. 1,700 civilians were estimated to have been killed in the subsequent repression and 350,000 fled into exile.

Nkurunziza's second term saw rising discontent with his leadership. Outdoor jogging was banned in June 2014 out of fear that group exercise might be used as cover for political meetings. Dissent came to a head with the public announcement on 25 April 2015 that Nkurunziza would stand for a third term in the presidential elections scheduled for June that year. This appeared to be contrary to the term limits established in the Arusha Accords and sparked widespread protests in Bujumbura and elsewhere which led to violent confrontations. However, the Constitutional Court ruled on 5 May that the projected third term was legal. The protests then escalated and dozens were killed.

A military uprising was attempted on 13 May 2015 by soldiers loyal to Godefroid Niyombare but collapsed after extensive fighting in Bujumbura. Assassinations of opposition politicians and critics took place and it was reported that detained protesters were tortured or raped at so-called "black sites" by regime loyalists from the National Intelligence Service (Service national de renseignement, SNR). The following months also saw the assassination of a number of CNDD–FDD officials and loyalists including Adolphe Nshimirimana. A rebel group emerged as the Republican Forces of Burundi (Forces républicaines du Burundi, FOREBU) and large numbers of civilians fled into exile. Despite the instability and a continuing opposition boycott, the elections took place in July and Nkurunziza was re-elected for a third term.

=== Third term, 2015–2020 ===
Nkurunziza's third term saw the country's increasing isolation in light of international condemnation of the repression which accompanied the 2015 unrest. On 4 August 2015, he ordered the police to find the murderers of his ally, Lieutenant General Adolphe Nshimirimana, within ten days who was represented as the right-hand man of the president. In 2016, Pierre Nkurunziza hired Luc Michel as his personal advisor.

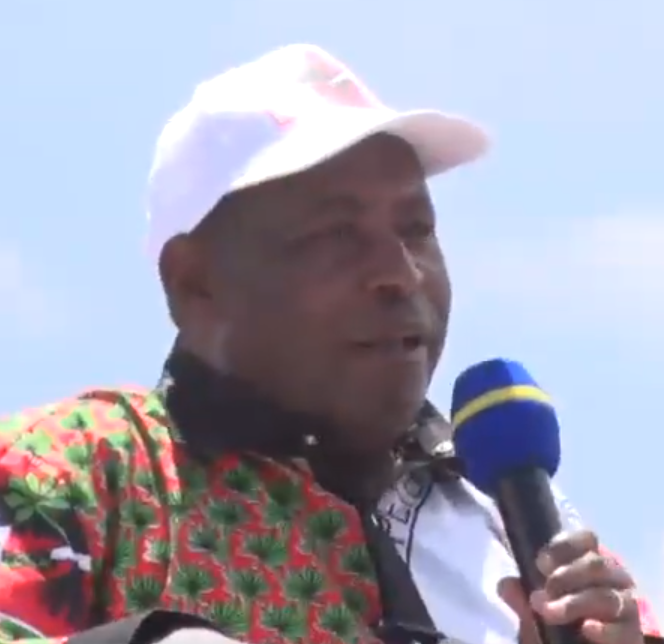
Évariste Ndayishimiye was endorsed by Nkurunziza as his preferred candidate for leadership of the CNDD–FDD ahead of the 2020 elections

The East African Community and African Union attempted to mediate the conflict unsuccessfully and Nkurunziza's regime became increasingly isolated. Fearing an outbreak of genocidal violence, the African Union attempted to dispatch a peacekeeping force to Burundi in 2016 but this was blocked by Nkurunziza. 1,700 civilians were estimated to have been killed in the subsequent repression and 390,000 fled across the border into Rwanda and the Democratic Republic of the Congo. Poverty increased and many middle-class Burundians emigrated. Nkurunziza withdrew Burundi from the International Criminal Court in 2017 and advocated constitutional reforms which would allow longer presidential terms which were approved in a disputed referendum in May 2018. However, in June 2018 he announced that he would not be standing for a fourth term and that he would consequently step down in 2020. The same year, he was given the title of "Permanent Visionary" (Visionnaire permanent) by the CNDD–FDD.

In March 2019, three girls were arrested for drawing on the president's portrait. Global outrage, with denunciations from Human Rights Watch and an international campaign on networks under the Hashtag #FreeOurGirls, forced the government, which agreed to release the three girls.

Ahead of his resignation, Nkurunziza endorsed Évariste Ndayishimiye as his candidate for leadership of the CNDD–FDD ahead of the elections scheduled for 2020. Ndayishimiye was considered to be a "close ally" and it had been reported that Nkurunziza "wanted to run the country from behind the scenes" after his resignation using Ndayishimiye as a puppet ruler. The elections took place in May 2020 and resulted in a large majority in favour of Nkurunziza's candidate but occurred against the backdrop of criticism of Nkurunziza's response to the COVID-19 pandemic in Burundi in which Nkurunziza expelled representatives of the World Health Organization (WHO) from Burundi. Election monitors from the East African Community were also kept out. Local sources assured that the COVID-19 had aggravated his ailment and that is why he declined a fourth term.

== Death ==
Nkurunziza died on 8 June 2020, aged 55, at the Fiftieth Anniversary Hospital of Karuzi. The Burundian government gave his cause of death as a heart attack, but it was widely suspected that he died of COVID-19. A week earlier, Kenyan newspaper The Standard reported his wife had flown without him to Nairobi, Kenya, for COVID-19 treatment.

Nkurunziza's death occurred after the 2020 elections, but ahead of the projected hand-over of power in August. It had been announced in May 2020 that he would continue to remain prominent in public life in the post of "Supreme Guide of Patriotism" (Guide suprême du patriotisme) with a retirement award of $540,000 (USD) and a villa provided by the government of Burundi. Seven national days of mourning were announced in Burundi following his death. Other states in the East African Community also observed official periods of mourning. One day of mourning was also observed in Cuba.

== See also ==
- List of heads of the executive by approval rating

Political offices
Preceded by Domitien Ndayizeye	President of Burundi; 2005–2020	Succeeded by Évariste Ndayishimiye
