= List of political parties in Burundi =

This article lists political parties in Burundi. Burundi has a multi-party system, with two or three strong parties and a third party that is electorally successful. Most parties are usually based on ethnic background, representing the majority Hutu or minority Tutsi and Twa groups. Before 1993, Burundi did not have contested multi-party elections.

== Parties represented in Parliament ==
Party	Abbr.	Flag	Leader	Ideology	Senate	Assembly
National Council for the Defense of Democracy – Forces for the Defense of Democracy; Conseil national pour la défense de la démocratie – Forces de défense de la démocratie	CNDD–FDD		Révérien Ndikuriyo	Hutu nationalism Right-wing populism	10 / 13	108 / 111
National Congress for Liberty; Congrès national pour la liberté	CNL		Nestor Girukwishaka	Hutu interests	0 / 13	0 / 111
Union for National Progress; Union pour le progrès national	UPRONA		Olivier Nkurunziza	Burundi nationalism Tutsi interests	0 / 13	0 / 111

== Parties without parliamentary representation ==
- National Congress for Freedom (CNL)
- Party for the Liberation of the Hutu People (PALIPEHUTU)
- Burundo-African Alliance for Salvation (ABASA)
- Front for Democracy in Burundi (FRODEBU)
- Green Party-Intwari (VERT-Intwari)
- Independent Labor Party (PIT)
- Liberal Alliance for Democracy (ALIDE)
- Kaze-Forces for the Defense of Democracy (KAZE-FDD)
- Liberal Party (PL)
- Movement for the Rehabilitation of Citizens-Rurenzangemero (MRC-Rurenzangemero)
- National Alliance for Law and Economic Development (ANADDE)
- National Council for the Defense of Democracy (CNDD)
- National Liberation Forces-Icanzo (FNL-Icanzo)
- National Liberation Front (FROLINA)
- New Alliance for Democracy and Development in Burundi (NADDEBU)
- Pan Africanist Socialist Movement-Inkinzo (MSP-Inkinzo)
- Parliamentary Monarchist Party (PMP)
- Party for a Non-Violent Society (SONOVI)
- Party for Democracy and Reconciliation (PADER)
- Party for Justice and Development (PAJUDE)
- Party for National Concord-Abasangirajambo (PACONA-Abasangirajambo)
- Party for National Recovery (PARENA)
- Party for Peace, Democracy, Reconciliation, and Reconstruction (PPDRR)
- Party for the Economic Independence of Burundi (PIEBU)
- Party for the Integral Renewal of Burundi-Intahemana (PARIBU-Intahemana)
- Party for the Liberation of People-Agakiza (PALIPE-Agakiza)
- Party for the Promotion of the Toiling Masses-Abanyamwete (PML-Abanyamwete)
- Party for the Reconstruction of the Burundian Nation in Community Development (RUSANGI)
- Party for the Restoration of Monarchy and Dialogue in Burundi (ABAHUZA)
- People's Reconciliation Party (PRP)
- Rally for Democracy and Economic and Social Development (RADDES)
- Rally for the People of Burundi (RPB)
- Social Democratic Party-Dusabikanye (PSD-Dusabikanye)
- Union for Peace and Development (UPD)

== Defunct parties ==
- Abanyamajambere Party (AB)
- African National Union of Ruanda-Urundi (UNARU)
- Association of Barundi Progressives and Democrats (APRODEBA)
- Barundi Workers' Rally (RTB)
- Burundi Workers' Party (UBU)
- Christian Democratic Party (PDC)
- Country Democratic Rally (RDP)
- Country Democratic Union (UDP)
- Free Socialist Party of Burundi (PARSOCILIBRE)
- National Union of Burundi-Abadahemuka (UNB-Abadahemuka)
- Party for the Independence of Burundi (PIBU)
- Party of the People (PP)
- People's Emancipation Party (PEP)
- People's Party (PP)
- People's Rally of Burundi (RPB)
- People's Union of Burundi (UPB)
- Progressive Movement of Burundi (MPB)
- Reconciliation Party (PR)
- Rural Democratic Party (PDR)
- Rural Movement of Burundi (MRB)
- Union for Hutu Promotion (UPROHUTU)
- Union of People's Parties (UPP)
- Union of the Hutu, Tutsi, and Twa of Burundi (UHTTB)
- Voice of the Murundi People (VPM)
- Young Workers' Party of Burundi (PDJTB)

== See also ==
- Lists of political parties
