= Elections in Burundi =

Burundi elects a head of state – the president – and a legislature on the national level. The National Assembly (Assemblée nationale) has 111 members, elected for a five-year term by proportional representation with a 2% barrier. The Senate (Sénat) has 13 members, elected for a five-year term by electoral colleges of communal councilors. Extra seats in both chambers can be added to ensure that ethnic and gender quotas are met. Burundi has a multi-party system, with two or three strong parties and a third party that is electorally successful. Parties are usually based on ethnic background.

== Latest election ==
=== President ===
Candidate	Party	Votes	%
Évariste Ndayishimiye	CNDD–FDD	3,082,210	71.45
Agathon Rwasa	National Congress for Liberty	1,084,788	25.15
Gaston Sindimwo	Union for National Progress	73,353	1.70
Domitien Ndayizeye	Kira Burundi Coalition	24,470	0.57
Léonce Ngendakumana	Front for Democracy in Burundi	21,232	0.49
Dieudonné Nahimana	Independent	18,709	0.43
Francis Rohero	Independent	8,942	0.21
Total		4,313,704	100.00
Valid votes		4,313,704	96.18
Invalid/blank votes		171,224	3.82
Total votes		4,484,928	100.00
Registered voters/turnout		5,113,418	87.71
Source: CENI

=== National Assembly ===
On 11 June the electoral commission announced that the ruling CNDD-FDD had won all seats in the National Assembly with 97% of the vote, as no other party had reached the 2% threshold. Opposition parties declared the results fraudulent and said the election had been rigged.

Party	Votes	%	Seats		
Party	Votes	%	Elected	Co-opted	Total
CNDD–FDD	5,654,807	96.51	100	8	108
Union for National Progress	80,639	1.38	0	0	0
National Congress for Liberty	34,267	0.58	0	0	0
Congress for Democracy and Progress	22,299	0.38	0	0	0
Coalition Burundi Bwa Bose	12,936	0.22	0	0	0
Brotherhood of Patriots	3,974	0.07	0	0	0
Parliamentary Monarchist Party	3,813	0.07	0	0	0
ADR-Imvugakuri	3,283	0.06	0	0	0
Alliance for People, Democracy and Reconciliation	2,996	0.05	0	0	0
Union for Peace and Democracy	2,858	0.05	0	0	0
National Rally for Change	2,705	0.05	0	0	0
Party for the Liberation of the Burundian People – Agakiza	1,880	0.03	0	0	0
Rally for Democracy and Economic and Social Development	1,742	0.03	0	0	0
National Liberation Forces – Icanzo	1,362	0.02	0	0	0
Democratic Rally for Burundi	1,083	0.02	0	0	0
FPN-Imboneza	783	0.01	0	0	0
Party for Democracy and Reconciliation	439	0.01	0	0	0
AND-Intadohoka	439	0.01	0	0	0
Liberal Party	354	0.01	0	0	0
National Liberation Front	186	0.00	0	0	0
Kaze–Forces for the Defense of Democracy	181	0.00	0	0	0
Independents	26,212	0.45	0	0	0
Twa members			–	3	3
Total	5,859,238	100.00	100	11	111
Valid votes	5,859,238	98.54			
Invalid votes	42,117	0.71			
Blank votes	44,514	0.75			
Total votes	5,945,869	100.00			
Registered voters/turnout	6,013,498	98.88			

== See also ==
- Internet censorship and surveillance in Burundi
- Electoral calendar
- Electoral system
- Mass media in Burundi
