= 2025 Burundian parliamentary election =

- 5 June 2025
- National Assembly
- All 100 directly elected seats in the National Assembly
Party	Leader	Vote %	Seats	+/–
CNDD–FDD	Révérien Ndikuriyo	96.51	108	+22
This lists parties that won seats. See the complete results below.
- Senate
- 13 seats in the Senate; 7 seats needed for a majority
Party	Leader	Current seats
CNDD–FDD	Révérien Ndikuriyo	
UPRONA	Olivier Nkurunziza	
CNL	Nestor Girukwishaka	

Parliamentary elections were held in Burundi on 5 June 2025 to elect members of the National Assembly and communal councils. The election took place amid a deepening socio-economic crisis and was marked by the effective exclusion of the main opposition party, the National Congress for Liberty (CNL), resulting in an expected victory for the ruling CNDD-FDD party.

== Background ==
Burundi has experienced decades of political instability, ethnic violence, and authoritarian rule. Since 2005, the CNDD-FDD has dominated Burundian politics. The 2025 election was the first parliamentary vote since President Évariste Ndayishimiye took office in 2020, succeeding Pierre Nkurunziza.

== Electoral system ==
The National Assembly consists of 100 members elected by closed list proportional representation in multi-member constituencies corresponding to the country's provinces. Seats are allocated using the d'Hondt method, with a national 2% electoral threshold. An additional three seats are reserved for members of the Twa ethnic group, and further members may be co-opted to ensure a 60–40 split between Hutu and Tutsi ethnic groups and a 30% quota for women.

The Senate is elected by colleges of local councillors, with similar ethnic and gender quotas.

== Campaign ==
The official campaign period began in early May 2025, with thousands of candidates participating in a ceremony in Gitega, the capital. Despite the festive start, the campaign was overshadowed by allegations of repression and the exclusion of the main opposition.

The CNL, which placed second in the 2020 elections, was suspended in 2023 by the Ministry of the Interior for alleged "irregularities." In late 2024, while party leader Agathon Rwasa was abroad, he was ousted from leadership in a move widely seen as orchestrated by the government. Rwasa and his allies were subsequently barred from joining other parties or standing as independents.

Opposition parties also accused the Imbonerakure, the youth wing of the CNDD-FDD, of harassing and intimidating their supporters.

== Voting and turnout ==
Over six million voters were registered for the 2025 elections, with 14,156 polling stations established nationwide and abroad, including 53 stations for the diaspora and peacekeeping missions. Early reports indicated high voter turnout, with long queues at polling stations despite ongoing fuel shortages and economic hardship.

President Ndayishimiye cast his vote in his home village and called on elected officials to serve the nation faithfully.

== Results ==
On 11 June the electoral commission announced that the ruling CNDD-FDD had won all seats in the National Assembly with 97% of the vote, as no other party had reached the 2% threshold. Opposition parties declared the results fraudulent and said the election had been rigged.

Party	Votes	%	Seats			
Party	Votes	%	Elected	Co-opted	Total	+/–
CNDD–FDD	5,654,807	96.51	100	8	108	+22
Union for National Progress	80,639	1.38	0	0	0	–2
National Congress for Liberty	34,267	0.58	0	0	0	–32
Congress for Democracy and Progress	22,299	0.38	0	0	0	New
Coalition Burundi Bwa Bose	12,936	0.22	0	0	0	New
Brotherhood of Patriots	3,974	0.07	0	0	0	New
Parliamentary Monarchist Party	3,813	0.07	0	0	0	New
ADR-Imvugakuri	3,283	0.06	0	0	0	New
Alliance for People, Democracy and Reconciliation	2,996	0.05	0	0	0	0
Union for Peace and Democracy	2,858	0.05	0	0	0	0
National Rally for Change	2,705	0.05	0	0	0	New
Party for the Liberation of the Burundian People – Agakiza	1,880	0.03	0	0	0	New
Rally for Democracy and Economic and Social Development	1,742	0.03	0	0	0	New
National Liberation Forces – Icanzo	1,362	0.02	0	0	0	New
Democratic Rally for Burundi	1,083	0.02	0	0	0	New
National People's Front–Imbonenza	783	0.01	0	0	0	0
Party for Democracy and Reconciliation	439	0.01	0	0	0	0
AND-Intadohoka	439	0.01	0	0	0	New
Liberal Party	354	0.01	0	0	0	New
National Liberation Front	186	0.00	0	0	0	New
Kaze–Forces for the Defense of Democracy	181	0.00	0	0	0	New
Independents	26,212	0.45	0	0	0	0
Twa members			–	3	3	0
Total	5,859,238	100.00	100	11	111	–12
Valid votes	5,859,238	98.54				
Invalid votes	42,117	0.71				
Blank votes	44,514	0.75				
Total votes	5,945,869	100.00				
Registered voters/turnout	6,013,498	98.88				
Source: CENI

== Reactions ==
Many voters expressed hope that new leaders would address urgent issues such as fuel shortages and inflation. However, analysts and observers noted that the election took place in an environment of limited political competition and ongoing repression.

Olivier Nkurunziza, leader of the opposition party Union for National Progress (UPRONA) said after the results were announced that "we have killed democracy," and that the party "denounces rigged elections." Another senior UPRONA official criticised the African Union for certifying the election as credible.
