= 2015 Burundian parliamentary election =

- 29 June 2015
- National Assembly
- 100 of the 121 seats in the National Assembly; 61 seats needed for a majority
Party	Leader	Vote %	Seats	+/–
CNDD–FDD	Pierre Nkurunziza	74.84	86	+5
IE	C. Nditije & A. Rwasa	13.85	30	New
UPRONA	Bonaventure Niyoyankana	3.09	2	−15
This lists parties that won seats. See the complete results below.
- Senate
- 36 of the 43 seats in the Senate; 22 seats needed for a majority
Party	Leader	Seats	+/–
CNDD–FDD	Pierre Nkurunziza	33	+1
UPRONA	Bonaventure Niyoyankana	2	0
FNL	Agathon Rwasa	1	+1
This lists parties that won seats. See the complete results below.

Parliamentary elections were held in Burundi on 29 June 2015. The vote had been initially set for 5 June 2015, alongside local elections, but it was delayed due to unrest. Indirect elections to the Senate occurred on 24 July.

== Background ==
In the previous legislative elections in 2010 the ruling National Council for the Defense of Democracy – Forces for the Defense of Democracy won a large majority. The election was boycotted by most opposition parties following claims of fraud in the local elections held on 24 May. This left the opposition Union for National Progress and Front for Democracy in Burundi–Nyakuri (which were supportive of the ruling party) the only other parties to win seats.

The announcement by the ruling party that the incumbent President of Burundi, Pierre Nkurunziza, would run for a third term in the presidential election, which was planned to be held on 26 June, sparked protest by those who were opposed to Nkurunziza seeking a third term in office.

Critics of the president say his actions jeopardise a peace deal that has kept ethnic tensions in check since the Burundian Civil War ended in 2005 and that Nkurunziza is not constitutionally permitted to seek a third term in office; his supporters argue that his first five-year term should not count because he was elected by a parliamentary vote rather than a popular vote.

Widespread demonstrations in the capital, Bujumbura, lasted for over three weeks. During that time the country's highest court approved Nkurunziza's right to run for a third term in office despite the fact that at least one of court's judges fled the country claiming he had received death threats from members of the government. As a result of the protests the government also shut down the country's internet and telephone network, closed all of the country's universities and government officials publicly referred to the protesters as "terrorists". Since late April tens of thousands of people have fled the country, hundreds of people have been arrested and several protesters and police have been killed while dozens more have been injured.

On 13 May a coup was announced, led by Maj. Gen. Godefroid Niyombare, while President Nkurunziza was in Tanzania attending an emergency conference about the situation in the country. By the next day the coup collapsed and government forces reasserted control.

The elections were originally planned to be held 26 May, but as a result of the unrest, the election was postponed to 5 June. The East African Community together with South African President Jacob Zuma called on the government to delay the elections. The opposition has also called for a delay, and stated they would boycott the elections on 5 June. The European Union and the Catholic Church of Burundi pulled out of observing the elections, stating that the vote could not be held fairly because of unrest and a crackdown of the media.

The head of the electoral commission, Pierre-Claver Ndayicariye (also President of the Truth and Reconciliation Commission) announced on 3 June that the parliamentary and local elections would not take place as planned on 5 June and were being delayed to an unspecified date. On 8 June 2015, the electoral commission proposed that the parliamentary election take place on 26 June. The date was later set as 29 June 2015.

== Electoral system ==
The National Assembly has 100 directly-elected members, who are elected in 18 multi-member constituencies (equal to the provinces) using the closed list proportional representation system, with seat allocation decided by the d'Hondt method with a national 2% electoral threshold. A further three members of the Twa ethnic group are appointed, and more members are co-opted to ensure a 60-40 split between Hutus and Tutsis, and a 30% quota for female MPs.

The Senate is elected by colleges of local councillors, with three Twa members appointed and more members co-opted to ensure a 50-50 split between Hutus and Tutsis and a 30% quota for female Senators.

== Campaign ==
Sixteen lists of parties, coalitions and independents contested the elections. Seventeen opposition parties announced on 26 June that they would boycott both the parliamentary election and the subsequent presidential election.

== Conduct ==
The African Union announced on 28 June that its election observers would not observe the parliamentary election scheduled for the next day, saying that the "necessary conditions" for "free, fair, transparent and credible elections" did not exist. United Nations observers stated that the elections were not "free, inclusive or credible" due to "a climate of widespread fear and intimidation in parts of the country".

== Results ==
=== National Assembly ===
Provisional results announced on 7 July 2015 showed the CNDD–FDD obtaining 77 of the 100 contested seats; the opposition coalition, which had called for a boycott, was credited with 21 seats, and UPRONA obtained two seats. Turnout was placed at 74.32%. The opposition coalition remained on the ballot papers despite boycotting and vowing that it would not participate in the next National Assembly. In the event that the elected deputies from the opposition do not take up their seats, according to the electoral law those seats would be reassigned to parties that received more than 5% of the vote.

Party	Votes	%	Seats			
Party	Votes	%	Elected	Co-opted	Total	+/–
CNDD–FDD	1,721,629	74.84	77	9	86	+5
Independents of Hope	318,717	13.85	21	9	30	New
Union for National Progress	71,189	3.09	2	0	2	–15
Front for Democracy in Burundi–Nyakuri	55,000	2.39	0	0	0	–5
ADC–Ikibiri	42,544	1.85	0	0	0	New
National Forces of Liberation	35,532	1.54	0	0	0	New
Movement for Solidarity and Democracy	20,275	0.88	0	0	0	New
National Rally for Reform	9,827	0.43	0	0	0	New
Coalition for Peace in Africa	8,893	0.39	0	0	0	New
MRC–Rurenzangemero	8,353	0.36	0	0	0	New
Union for Peace and Democracy	6,040	0.26	0	0	0	New
Party for the Liberation of the Burundian People – Agakiza	910	0.04	0	0	0	New
Social Democratic Party – Dusabikanye	660	0.03	0	0	0	New
Party for Democracy and Reconciliation	459	0.02	0	0	0	New
Isidore Rufyikiri List	416	0.02	0	0	0	New
RDB	19	0.00	0	0	0	New
Co-opted Twa members			–	3	3	0
Total	2,300,463	100.00	100	21	121	+15
Valid votes	2,300,463	80.55				
Invalid/blank votes	555,649	19.45				
Total votes	2,856,112	100.00				
Registered voters/turnout	3,843,024	74.32				
Source: CENI

=== Senate ===
The Senate was elected on 24 July by an electoral college composed of local councillors. The chamber gained two members as a result of the creation of Rumonge Province.

Party	Seats			
Party	Elected	Co-opted	Total	+/–
CNDD–FDD	33	0	33	+1
Union for National Progress	2	0	2	0
National Forces of Liberation	1	0	1	+1
Co-opted Twa members	–	3	3	0
Former presidents	–	4	4	0
Total	36	7	43	+2
Source: IPU

== Aftermath ==
The National Assembly began meeting for its new term on 27 July 2015. Members of Amizero y'Abarundi, the opposition coalition, were divided on whether to take up their parliamentary seats. The main opposition leader, Agathon Rwasa, said that 20 deputies from his party, the National Forces of Liberation (FNL), would take up their seats, but Charles Nditije of the Union for National Progress (UPRONA) said that the 10 UPRONA deputies would not. Nditije said that it would be "impossible to take seats" considering that they had boycotted the election.

On 30 July 2015, Pascal Nyabenda, the President of the CNDD-FDD, was elected as President of the National Assembly. Agathon Rwasa was elected as First Vice-President and Edouard Nduwimana, who had been Minister of the Interior, as Second Vice-President. There were no opposing candidates for any of the three positions. Nyabenda received 101 votes and Rwasa, with the backing of CNDD-FDD deputies, received 108 out of 112 votes. By accepting a top post in the legislature and appearing to adopt a conciliatory approach to the government, Rwasa infuriated some in the opposition, who viewed his actions as betrayal.

Révérien Ndikuriyo, a CNDD-FDD Senator, was elected as President of the Senate on 14 August 2015. He was the only candidate for the post and was unanimously elected. Spès Caritas Njebarikanuye, a CNDD-FDD Senator, was elected as First Vice-President of the Senate, and Anicet Niyongabo, a UPRONA Senator, was elected as Second Vice-President.
