= Senate of Burundi (2010) =

The 2010 Senate of Burundi sat from 2010 to 2015.

== Background ==
In October 1997 the first Hutu President of Burundi, Melchior Ndadaye, was assassinated. This led to a civil war in which about 300,000 people died. The first elections after the official return of peace were held in July 2005 under a constitution which gave quotas in the National Assembly of Burundi and Senate of Burundi for Hutu, Tutsi and Twa candidates, and well as quotas for women. The National Council for the Defence of Democracy – Front for the Defence of Democracy (CNDD-FDD) won large majorities in both chambers. Pierre Nkurunziza of the CNDD-FDD was elected president.

There were various upheavals during the term of this government. The former CNDD-FDD leader Hussein Radjabu was expelled from the party, some parliamentarians defected to the opposition in protest and were also expelled from the CNDD-FDD, the CNDD-FDD, Uprona and Frodebu formed a coalition government, the Constitutional Court threw the CNDD-FDD defectors out of office, 12 members of Frodebu defected to form Frodebu-Nyakuri in alliance with the CNDD-FDD, and a new electoral law was passed in which senators and deputies lose their mandate if they defect or are expelled from the party on whose platform they were elected.

== 2010 national election ==
Local council elections were held in May 2010, won by the CNDD-FDD. The opposition parties claimed the results were fraudulent. Presidential elections were held in June 2010, boycotted by the six opposition candidates. The main opposition candidate, Agathon Rwasa of the Forces for National Liberation (FNL), went into hiding before the election. The sole remaining candidate, incumbent President Pierre Nkurunziza, was re-elected with 91.62% of the votes. On 23 July 2010, 66.68% of the 3.5 million registered voters voted for National Assembly members. Again several opposition parties boycotted the elections. The CNDD-FDD won 80 seats. Uprona won 16 seats. Frodebu-Nyakuri, allied with the CNDD-NDD, won 4 seats.

Indirect elections to the Senate of Burundi were held in local councils on 28 July 2010. The National Council for the Defense of Democracy – Front for the Defense of Democracy (CNDD-FDD) won 32 seats of the 34 that were contested. The Union for National Progress (Uprona) won two seats. Three Twa members were coopted, including two women. The four former presidents (Domitien Ndayizeye, Sylvestre Ntibantunganya, Jean-Baptiste Bagaza and Pierre Buyoya) continued to serve as senators, making 41 senators in total. The Senate elected Mr. Gabriel Ntisezerana (CNDD-FDD) as President of the Senate on 20 August 2010.

== Summary of election results ==
In summary, election results were:

Party	Votes	%	Seats			
Party	Votes	%	Elected	Co-opted	Total	+/–
CNDD–FDD			32	0	32	0
Union for National Progress			2	0	2	0
Co-opted Twa members			–	3	3	0
Former presidents			–	4	4	0
Total			34	7	41	–7
Total votes	1,500	–				
Registered voters/turnout	1,935	77.52				

== Members ==
Members of the senate elected on 28 July 2010 were:

Province	Surname, given name	Ethnicity	Gender	Party	elected / coopted
Bubanza Province	Ntisezerana, Gabriel	Hutu	M	CNDD-FDD	elected
Bubanza Province	Ndabaneze, Immaculee	Tutsi	F	CNDD-FDD	elected
Bujumbura Province	Nyandwi, Daphrose	Hutu	F	CNDD-FDD	elected
Bujumbura Province	Rwanicineza, Laurent	Tutsi	M	CNDD-FDD	elected
Bururi Province	Nkengurutse, Emmanuel	Tutsi	M	UPRONA	elected
Bururi Province	Nizigama, Veronique	Hutu	F	CNDD-FDD	elected
Cankuzo Province	Ndayiragije, Samuel	Hutu	M	CNDD-FDD	elected
Cankuzo Province	Nijebariko, Antoinette	Tutsi	F	CNDD-FDD	elected
Cibitoke Province	Kurisansuma, Jean Bosco	Hutu	M	CNDD-FDD	elected
Cibitoke Province	Habarugira, Hawa	Tutsi	F	CNDD-FDD	elected
Gitega Province	Rufyikiri, Gervais	Hutu	M	CNDD-FDD	elected
Gitega Province	Sinankwa, Fides	Tutsi	F	CNDD-FDD	elected
Gitega Province	Bigirimana, Sophie (age 37)	Twa	F	AIDB	coopt
Karuzi Province	Ndikumako, Athanase	Tutsi	M	CNDD-FDD	elected
Karuzi Province	Mwashamba, Ismail	Hutu	F	CNDD-FDD	elected
Kayanza Province	Ndabirabe, Daniel Gelase	Hutu	M	CNDD-FDD	elected
Kayanza Province	Ntawiha, Genevieve	Tutsi	F	CNDD-FDD	elected
Kirundo Province	Ndemeye, Emmanuel	Hutu	M	CNDD-FDD	elected
Kirundo Province	Kankindi, Jenipher	Tutsi	F	CNDD-FDD	elected
Kirundo Province	Bambanze, Vital (age 38)	Twa	M	UNIPROBA	coopt
Makamba Province	Ndikuriyo, Reverien	Hutu	M	CNDD-FDD	elected
Makamba Province	Ndayizeye, Francoise	Tutsi	F	CNDD-FDD	elected
Muramvya Province	Nizigama, Clotilde	Hutu	F	CNDD-FDD	elected
Muramvya Province	Binegako, Sylvere	Tutsi	M	CNDD-FDD	elected
Muyinga Province	Rugagamiza, Chrysologue	Hutu	M	CNDD-FDD	elected
Muyinga Province	Ndayirorere, Christine	Tutsi	F	CNDD-FDD	elected
Mwaro Province	Kekenwa, Jeremie	Hutu	M	CNDD-FDD	elected
Mwaro Province	Nduwimana, Bemardine	Tutsi	F	CNDD-FDD	elected
Mwaro Province	Nicayenzi, Liberate (age 53)	Twa	F	UNIPROBA	coopt
Ngozi Province	NduWamungu, Francois Exavier	Hutu	M	CNDD-FDD	elected
Ngozi Province	Mwidogo, Persille	Tutsi	F	CNDD-FDD	elected
Rutana Province	Muhungu, Jean Bosco	Tutsi	M	CNDD-FDD	elected
Rutana Province	Ciza, Virginie	Hutu	F	CNDD-FDD	elected
Ruyigi Province	Surwumwe, Edouard	Hutu	M	CNDD-FDD	elected
Ruyigi Province	Citegetse, Esperance	Tutsi	F	CNDD-FDD	elected
Bujumbura Mairie Province	Niyongabo, Pontien	Tutsi	M	CNDD-FDD	elected
Bujumbura Mairie Province	Gakobwa, Révocate	Hutu	F	NCDD-FDD	elected

== Sources ==
- Arret RCCB 240 rendu par la cour constitutionnelle du Burundi portant sur la regularite des elections senatoriales du 28 juillet 2010 et la proclamation des resultats definitifs (PDF) (in French), cour constitutionnelle du Burundi
- BURUNDI Inama Nkenguzamateka (Senate) Elections in 2010, Inter-Parliamentary Union
- "Indirect Legislative Elections in Sub-Saharan Africa Election Results BURUNDI 28 July 2010 Senatorial Election", African Elections Database
