= Politics of Burundi =

The politics of Burundi take place in a framework of a transitional presidential representative democratic republic, whereby the president of Burundi is both head of state and head of government, and of a multi-party system. Executive power is exercised by the government. Legislative power is vested in both the government and the two chambers of parliament, the Senate and the National Assembly.

== Political landscape after the civil war ==
The political landscape of Burundi has been dominated in recent years by the civil war and a long peace process and move to democracy. Pierre Nkurunziza, a former rebel leader of the Hutu National Council for the Defense of Democracy – Forces for the Defense of Democracy, was elected to become president in a vote by parliament on 19 August 2005. Nkurunziza, who was the sole candidate, was the first president chosen through democratic means since the start of the civil war in 1993 and was sworn in on 26 August, replacing transitional president Domitien Ndayizeye.

Incumbent president Évariste Ndayishimiye took office on 18 June 2020, ten days after the death of Nkurunziza.

In November 1995, the presidents of Burundi, Rwanda, Uganda, and Zaire (currently Democratic Republic of Congo) announced a regional initiative for a negotiated peace in Burundi facilitated by former Tanzanian President Julius Nyerere. In July 1996, former Burundian President Buyoya returned to power in a bloodless coup. He declared himself president of a transitional republic, even as he suspended the National Assembly, banned opposition groups, and imposed a nationwide curfew. Widespread condemnation of the coup ensued, and regional countries imposed economic sanctions pending a return to a constitutional government. Buyoya agreed in 1996 to liberalize political parties. Nonetheless, fighting between the army and Hutu militias continued. In June 1998, Buyoya promulgated a transitional constitution and announced a partnership between the government and the opposition-led National Assembly. After facilitator Julius Nyerere's death in October 1999, the regional leaders appointed Nelson Mandela as Facilitator of the Arusha peace process. Under Mandela the peace process has revived and important progress has taken place.

In April 2015 the 2015 Burundian unrest broke out after the ruling party announced President Pierre Nkurunziza would seek a third term in office. Protests in the capital lasted over a week, and while President Nkurunziza was in Tanzania for talks at resolving the situation, Major General Godefroid Niyombare declared a coup, leading to gun battles in the capital for control of key locations.

Elections took place in 2020; despite concerns that these elections would be severely compromised, following the announcement that the President would not seek reelection, the opposition announced that they would be taking part in the election. Evariste Ndayishimiye, a candidate who was hand-picked as Nkurunziza's successor by the CNDD-FDD, won the election with 71.45% of the vote. Shortly after, on 9 June 2020, Nkurunziza died of a cardiac arrest, at the age of 55. As per the constitution, Pascal Nyabenda, the president of the national assembly, led the government until Ndayishimiye's inauguration on 18 June 2020.

== Executive branch ==
Main office-holders
Office	Name	Party	Since
President	Évariste Ndayishimiye	CNDD-FDD	18 June 2020
Vice-president	Prosper Bazombanza	UPRONA	23 June 2020
Prime Minister	Nestor Ntahontuye	CNDD-FDD	05 August 2025

The president is popularly elected by a two-round system. They nominate a vice-president and a prime minister, who form together with the Council of Ministers the executive branch.

== Legislative branch ==
The National Assembly (Assemblée nationale) has 118 members, elected for a five-year term by proportional representation with a 2% barrier. The Senate (Sénat) has 49 members, elected for a five-year term by electoral colleges of communal councilors. Extra seats in both chambers can be added to ensure that ethnic and gender quotas are met. Burundi has a multi-party system, with two or three strong parties and a third party that is electorally successful. Parties are usually based on ethnic background.

== Administrative divisions ==
Until 2025, Burundi had 18 provinces: Bubanza, Bujumbura Mairie, Bujumbura Rural, Bururi, Cankuzo, Cibitoke, Gitega, Karuzi, Kayanza, Kirundo, Makamba, Muramvya, Muyinga, Mwaro, Ngozi, Rutana, Rumonge and Ruyigi.

Under the new administrative divisions that began in 2025, these provinces were combined into 5 new provinces : Buhumuza, Bujumbura, Burunga, Butanyerera and Gitega.

== International relations ==
Burundi is member of the AfDB, EAC, CEEAC, CEPGL, COMESA, ECA, FAO, G-77, IBRD, ICAO, ICRM, IDA, IFAD, IFC, IFRCS, ILO, IMF, Intelsat (nonsignatory user), Interpol, IOC, ITU, NAM, OAU, OPCW, PMAESA, UN, UNCTAD, UNESCO, UNIDO, UPU,WBG, WHO, WIPO, WMO, WToO, and WTrO.
