= 2015 Burundian presidential election =

- 21 July 2015
- Registered: 3,848,119
- Turnout: 73.44% (▼3.55pp)
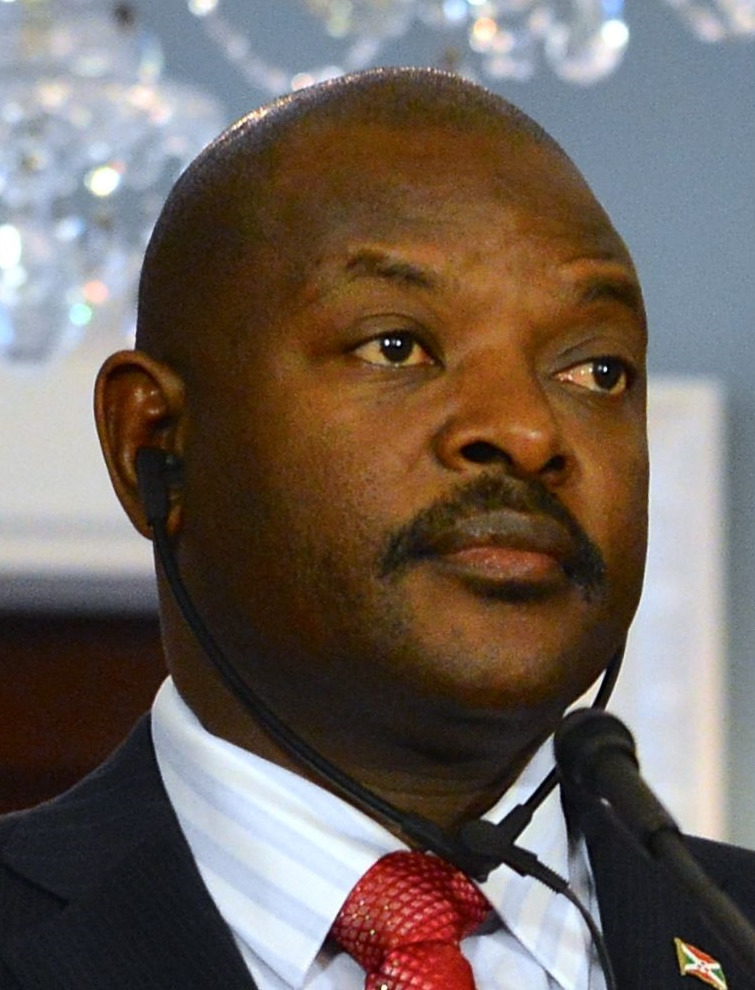

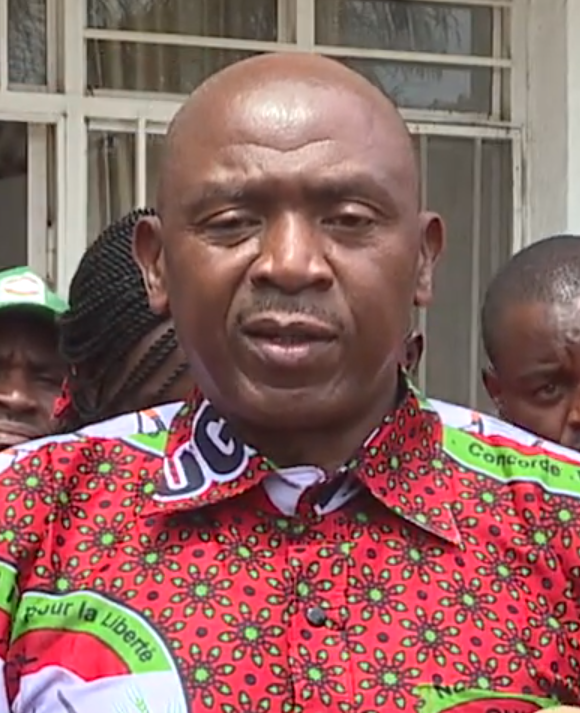
Nominee	Pierre Nkurunziza	Agathon Rwasa
Party	CNDD–FDD	Independents of Hope
Popular vote	1,961,510	536,625
Percentage	73.91%	20.22%
President before election
Pierre Nkurunziza
CNDD–FDD
Elected President
Pierre Nkurunziza
CNDD–FDD

Presidential elections were held in Burundi on 21 July 2015. President Pierre Nkurunziza ran for a third term despite controversy over whether he was eligible to run again. The opposition boycotted the vote, and Nkurunziza won re-election.

== Electoral system ==
The elections were held using the two-round system. If no candidate had won a majority of the vote in the first round, a second round would have been held.

== Candidates ==
=== Nkurunziza re-election controversy ===
The ruling CNDD–FDD and the opposition disagreed over whether President Pierre Nkurunziza was eligible to run for a third term in office. Allies of Nkurunziza claimed that he was eligible for a third term, as his first term began after being elected by Parliament rather than a popular vote, and so was not included in the term limit.

During a two-day visit to Burundi in March 2015, Tanzanian President Jakaya Kikwete warned of a risk of violence if the constitution and the 2005 Arusha Peace Agreement is not adhered to. The Roman Catholic Church, which constitute two-thirds of Burundians population and also played a key role in the peace talks, expressed concern as well, insisting that the constitution barred Nkurunziza from running for another term.

In April 2015 the CNDD–FDD nominated Nkurunziza as its candidate. The decision prompted days of protests and clashes with police in Bujumbura. The government denounced the unrest and accused the opposition of trying to reignite the violence and ethnic tensions of the civil war.

On 5 May 2015 the Constitutional Court ruled that Nkurunziza was eligible to stand for a third term, although its ruling followed the court's Vice President Sylvere Nimpagaritse fleeing the country, saying that most of the court judges believed that Nkurunziza standing for a third term was unconstitutional, but that they had come under pressure to change their minds. On 13 May a coup attempt was launched by elements in the military opposed to Nkurunziza's third term bid, but loyalist soldiers reasserted control by the next day.

The African Union and the United States both called for Nkurunziza not to stand for a third term. On 19 May following a meeting of regional leaders, South African President Jacob Zuma called for the election to be indefinitely delayed.

On 27 May the government urged citizens to donate money to help finance the election, reacting to the possibility of foreign aid being cut by saying that the vote would be held regardless. On 31 May regional leaders of the East African Community called for the election to be delayed by six weeks. While the Burundian government responded positively, protesters were angry that the EAC said nothing about Nkurunziza's candidacy.

On 8 June 2015 the electoral commission proposed that the date of the presidential election be moved from 26 June to 15 July, delaying the vote by nearly three weeks.

Nkurunziza began his re-election campaign at a rally on 25 June.

On 11 July 2015 in response to requests from regional leaders, the government announced another delay, pushing the vote back by six days to 21 July. Although the regional leaders had requested a delay to 30 July to allow time for a potential mediation effort coordinated by the President of Uganda, Yoweri Museveni, the government pointed to the constitutional requirement that the vote be held no later than 26 July, one month prior to the expiration of Nkurunziza's term. With the election only days away, the mediation effort was largely unsuccessful. Museveni acted as mediator for one day and then placed the Ugandan Minister of Defense, Crispus Kiyonga, in charge of the effort. Government representatives did not attend the talks on 19 July, and they were consequently suspended.

=== Opposition ===
In December 2014 it was announced that eight opposition parties would field a joint candidate for the presidential elections, as well as running together in the parliamentary elections.

On 10 June 2015 various opposition leaders called for a boycott of the election, rejecting the notion of holding the vote amidst ongoing protests and controversy regarding Nkurunziza's re-election bid and complaining that the election should have been delayed further, especially in light of the EAC's call for a six-week delay.

17 opposition parties announced on 26 June that they would boycott the election. With the entire opposition, including key opposition candidate Agathon Rwasa, calling for a boycott, United Nations Secretary-General Ban Ki-moon called for another postponement on the same day, "in order to create a conducive environment for inclusive, peaceful and transparent elections", and he urged dialogue between the government and the opposition. Albert Shingiro, Burundi's Permanent Representative to the UN, rejected the notion of postponing the vote again. He argued that it was constitutionally necessary to hold the vote as planned and that to do otherwise would mean an "institutional vacuum", and he said that it would be unacceptable for the overwhelming majority of voters to be held "hostage" by a small "radical minority" who opposed holding the election on schedule.

Although the opposition candidates pulled out of the race and called for a boycott, their names remained on ballot papers.

== Results ==
The electoral commission announced on 24 July 2015 that Nkurunziza had won the election with 74% of the vote. Agathon Rwasa was placed second and credited with 20% despite calling for a boycott. The CNDD-FDD described Nkurunziza's re-election as a "stunning victory" and a "divine miracle".

Candidate	Party	Votes	%
Pierre Nkurunziza	CNDD–FDD	1,961,510	73.91
Agathon Rwasa	Independents of Hope	536,625	20.22
Gerard Nduwayo	Union for National Progress	60,380	2.28
Jean Minani	Front for Democracy in Burundi–Nyakuri	38,554	1.45
Jacques Bigirimana	National Forces of Liberation	28,609	1.08
Domitien Ndayizeye	National Rally for Reform	19,996	0.75
Jean De Dieu Mutabazi	Coalition for Peace in Africa	4,436	0.17
Sylvestre Ntibantunganya	Gira Ijambo	3,952	0.15
Total		2,654,062	100.00
Valid votes		2,654,062	93.91
Invalid/blank votes		172,010	6.09
Total votes		2,826,072	100.00
Registered voters/turnout		3,848,119	73.44
Source: CENI

== Aftermath ==
Nkurunziza was sworn in for his third term a few days early, on 20 August 2015. The ceremony was not announced until the same day it was held. Speaking on the occasion, he described his re-election as "a victory of all Burundians". He vowed that if his enemies continued to pursue violence, they would be beaten with the aid of God and "scattered like flour thrown into the air". Later on the same day, Nkurunziza's newly appointed vice-presidents were sworn in: Gaston Sindimwo, the Secretary-General of UPRONA, was designated as First Vice-President, while Joseph Butore of the CNDD-FDD was designated as Second Vice-President.

Nkurunziza appointed a new government on 25 August 2015. Nkurunziza loyalists considered to be hardliners were appointed to key posts, but supporters of Rwasa, who had adopted a conciliatory attitude toward the government, were appointed to head five less important ministries.
