= Senate of Burundi (2020) =

The 2020 Senate of Burundi was indirectly elected in 2020 for a five-year term.

== Background ==
Burundi has suffered from political instability since before 2015, with many Burundians leaving the country. A new constitution was adopted after a referendum held in May 2018. When President Pierre Nkurunziza announced he would not seek a fourth term, the ruling National Council for the Defense of Democracy – Front for the Defense of Democracy (CNDD-FDD) party chose the retired army general Evariste Ndayishimiye as their candidate.

The United Nations Human Rights Council Commission of Inquiry on Burundi said the election campaign that officially started in April 2020 was "characterized by an increase in political intolerance and numerous acts of violence and human rights violations". The elections for the National Assembly were held on 20 May 2020. The government did not allow observers from the United Nations and the African Union to the monitor these elections, claiming they were too close to the opposition. The CNDD-FDD took 72 of the 100 seats up for election, while the National Congress for Liberty (CNL) led by Agathon Rwasa took 27 seats.

== Election ==
The indirect election of 36 senators (two from each province) took place on 20 July 2020. The National Council for the Defense of Democracy - Front for the Defense of Democracy (CNDD-FDD) won 34 seats, or 94.4%. The Union for National Progress (UPRONA) and the National Congress for Liberty (CNL) each won one seat. 21 men were elected and 15 women. Three Twa were coopted as senators, including one woman, bring the total up to 39. The speaker of the Senate, elected on 25 August 2020, was Emmanuel Sinzohagera (b. 24 March 1974) of the CNDD-FDD.

== Members ==
Members of the 2020 senate were:

Surname, Given Name	Constituency	Sex	Born	Age
Nzigamiye, Jacqueline	Bubanza Province	F	1972	48
Ndayishimiye, Rénilde	Bujumbura Province	F	1962	58
Niteretse, Spéciose	Cankuzo Province	F	1984	36
Ndayizeye, Spès	Cibitoke Province	F	1981	39
Njebarikanuye, Spès-Caritas; 1st Vice-president Of Senate	Gitega Province	F	1970	50
Dushimirimana, Bénie	Kayanza Province	F	1980	40
Faida, Dévote	Kirundo Province	F	1983	37
Ndayizeye, Anita	Mairie de Bujumbura	F	1969	51
Ndabahinyuye, Chantal	Makamba Province	F	1982	38
Ntibagirirwa, Imelde	Muramvya Province	F	1956	64
Dukundane, Carine Bélyse	Muyinga Province	F	1978	42
Ndadaye, Denise	Mwaro Province	F	1968	52
Nshimirimana, Marie Chantal	Ngozi Province	F	1980	40
Nyiraneza, Joséphine	Ngozi Province	F	1959	61
Nzeyimana, Rose	Rumonge Province	F	1964	56
Nizigiyimana, Benoîte	Ruyigi Province	F	1972	48
Bashemeza, Daniel	Bubanza Province	M	1963	57
Sinzohagera, Emmanuel; President Of Senate	Bujumbura Province	M	1974	46
Barutwanayo, Jean Bosco	Bururi Province	M	1967	53
Nahimana, Ernest	Bururi Province	M	1969	51
Njiji, Désiré	Cankuzo Province	M	1979	41
Kurisansuma, Jean Bosco	Cibitoke Province	M	1954	66
Ndayisavye, Ferdinand	Gitega Province	M	1981	39
Sukunoba, Vincent	Gitega Province	M	1982	38
Bisabwimana, Antoine	Karusi Province	M	1976	44
Nibirantije, Jean Marie	Karusi Province	M	1971	49
Gasunzu, Pascal	Kayanza Province	M	1967	53
Ntunzwenimana, Jean Bosco	Kirundo Province	M	1972	48
Nyagasani, Déo	Mairie de Bujumbura	M	1962	58
Ndikuriyo, Révérien	Makamba Province	M	1970	50
Girukwishaka, Victor	Muramvya Province	M	1956	64
Ndihokubwayo, Pacifique	Muyinga Province	M	1983	37
Ninteretse, François	Mwaro Province	M	1971	49
Ntakarutimana, Joseph	Ngozi Province	M	1960	60
Ndizeye, Charles	Rumonge Province	M	1972	48
Nibitanga, Ndutura	Rumonge Province	M	1978	42
Nduwabike, Aaron	Rutana Province	M	1981	39
Nkurunziza, Fabrice	Rutana Province	M	1981	39
Nshimirimana, Cyriaque; 2nd Vice-président Of Senate	Ruyigi Province	M	1975	45

== Sources ==
- Burundi National Assembly Election results, Inter-Parliamentary Union
- Burundi Senate Election Results, IPU: Inter-Parliamentary Union
- Senators list (in French), Senate of Burundi
