= National Assembly of Burundi (2020) =

National Council for the Defense of Democracy – Forces for the Defense of Democracy (CNDD–FDD) : 86 seats Congrès national pour la liberté (CNL) : 32 seats Union pour le progrès national (Uprona) : 2 seats Sièges réservés aux Twas: 3 seats

The National Assembly of Burundi (2020) was elected in May 2020. The ruling CNDD-FDD party retained its majority in the National Assembly of Burundi.

== Background ==
Burundi has suffered from political instability since before 2015, with many Burundians leaving the country. A new constitution was adopted after a referendum held in May 2018. When President Pierre Nkurunziza announced he would not seek to be elected for a fourth term, the ruling CNDD-FDD party chose the retired army general Evariste Ndayishimiye as their candidate.

The United Nations Human Rights Council Commission of Inquiry on Burundi said the election campaign that officially started in April 2020 was "characterized by an increase in political intolerance and numerous acts of violence and human rights violations". The government did not allow observers from the United Nations and the African Union to the monitor the 2020 elections, claiming that they were too close to the opposition.

== Election ==
The elections for the National Assembly were held on 20 May 2020. Out of 5,113,418 registered voters 4,464,359 cast their votes, for a 87.3% turnout. The ruling National Council for the Defense of Democracy – Front for the Defense of Democracy (CNDD-FDD) took 72 of the 100 seats up for election, while the National Congress for Liberty (CNL) led by Agathon Rwasa took 27 seats.

72 Hutus and 28 Tutsis were directly elected. Of these, 35 were women. The constitution requires a 60:40 Hutu-Tutsi balance, with 30% per cent women. 20 Tutsis, of whom 9 were men and 11 women were co-opted to reach these ratios. Also, 3 Twas were coopted as representatives, including one woman. With the coopted members, the 2020 National Assembly had 123 members of whom 47 were women.

== Members ==
Members of the National Assembly as of 8 May 2023 were:

NAME given name	Sex	Party	Ethnicity	Constituency
BACIMISI Donathile	F	CNL	Hutu	Cibitoke Province
BARAMPAMA Chantal	F	CNDD-FDD	Tutsi	Bujumbura Province
BARAMPAMA Nadine	F	CNDD-FDD	Hutu	Karusi Province
BARYANINTIMBA Ildephonse	M	CNL	Hutu	Kirundo Province
BAZIZANE Médiatrice	F	CNDD-FDD	Tutsi	Ngozi Province
BIGERUMUSASE Remy	M	CNDD-FDD	Hutu	Kirundo Province
BIGIRIMANA Emmanuel	M	CNDD-FDD	Tutsi	Cibitoke Province
BIGIRIMANA Salvator	M	CNDD-FDD	Hutu	Cankuzo Province
BIGIRIMANA Zénon	M	CNL	Hutu	Mwaro Province
BIGIRUMUHIRE Edmond	M	CNDD-FDD	Tutsi	Kirundo Province
BIZIMUNGU Simon	M	CNL	Hutu	Cibitoke Province
BIZUMUREMYI Pascal	M	CNL	Hutu	Ruyigi Province
BUCUMI Pétronie	F	CNDD-FDD	Hutu	Bururi Province
BUKURU Caritas	F	CNL	Tutsi	Bujumbura Province
BUREGURE Elias	M	CNDD-FDD	Tutsi	Bujumbura Mairie Province
BUTOYI Désiré	M	CNDD-FDD	Tutsi	Gitega Province
CISHAHAYO Emmanuella	F	CNDD-FDD	Tutsi	Rumonge Province
GAHITIRA Rédempteur	M	CNDD-FDD	Hutu	Muyinga Province
GAHUNGU Thacien	M	CNDD-FDD	Hutu	Ruyigi Province
GASHATSI Abel	M	UPRONA	Tutsi	Muramvya Province
GIKEKE Pascal	M	CNL	Hutu	Bujumbura Mairie Province
HABARUGIRA Fidélité	F	CNDD-FDD	Tutsi	Gitega Province
HABARUGIRA Lydwine	F	CNL	Hutu	Bururi Province
HABONARUGIRA Suavis	F	CNDD-FDD	Hutu	Gitega Province
HAKIZIMANA Georges	M	CNDD-FDD	Hutu	Bujumbura Mairie Province
HAKIZIMANA Léopold	M	CNL	Hutu	Kayanza Province
HARERIMANA Alice	F	CNDD-FDD	Tutsi	Cibitoke Province
HARUSHIMANA Laurent	M	CNL	Hutu	Makamba Province
HASABINTWARI Jean Claude	M	CNDD-FDD	Hutu	Kirundo Province
HATUNGIMANA Athanase	M	CNDD-FDD	Tutsi	Bururi Province
HATUNGIMANA Godeberthe	F	CNL	Tutsi	Rutana Province
HIBONEYE Dieudonné	M	CNDD-FDD	Tutsi	Ngozi Province
INAMUCO Aline	F	CNL	Tutsi	Bujumbura Mairie Province
KANEZA Marie Claire	F	CNDD-FDD	Tutsi	Muyinga Province
KARERA Denis	M	CNDD-FDD	Hutu	Gitega Province
KARORERO Anatole	M	CNL	Hutu	Kirundo Province
KAYOBERA Evariste	F	CNDD-FDD	Tutsi	Karusi Province
KWIZERA Jean Claude	M	CNL	Tutsi	Mwaro Province
MALAYIKA Pamphile	M	CNL	Hutu	Muyinga Province
MANIRABARUSHA Aline	F	CNDD-FDD	Hutu	Muyinga Province
MANIRAKIZA Alexis	M	CNL	Hutu	Bubanza Province
MANIRAKIZA Côme	M	CNDD-FDD	Hutu	Bubanza Province
MANIRAKIZA Emile	M	CNL	Hutu	Bururi Province
MANIRAKIZA Francine	F	CNDD-FDD	Hutu	Rutana Province
MANIRAMBONA Antoine	M	CNDD-FDD	Tutsi	Makamba Province
MANIRAMBONA Prosper	M	CNDD-FDD	Hutu	Muramvya Province
MANIRAMBONA Térence	M	CNL	Hutu	Gitega Province
MBANYE Jean Berchmans	M	CNL	Hutu	Bujumbura Province
MBONEKO Sauda	F	CNDD-FDD	Hutu	Bujumbura Province
MBONINYIBUKA Parfait	M	CNDD-FDD	Tutsi	Rutana Province
MINANI Violette	F	CNDD-FDD	Tutsi	Rutana Province
MISAGO Zachée	M	CNDD-FDD	Hutu	Makamba Province
MPAWENAYO Justine	F	CNDD-FDD	Hutu	Ngozi Province
MPOZERINIGA Félix	M	CNL	Hutu	Ngozi Province
MUTEZINKA Euphrasie	F	CNL	Tutsi	Kirundo Province
MVUYEKURE Lazare	M	CNDD-FDD	Hutu	Gitega Province
NAHAYO Claude	M	CNDD-FDD	Hutu	Ngozi Province
NAHAYO Révérien	M	CNDD-FDD	Hutu	Rutana Province
NAHIMANA Dieudonné	M	CNDD-FDD	Hutu	Bujumbura Province
NAHIMANA Marie Rose	F	CNDD-FDD	Tutsi	Cankuzo Province
NAKAMANA Euphrasie	F	CNDD-FDD	Hutu	Karusi Province
NAKUMURYANGO Léonidas	M	CNDD-FDD	Hutu	Karusi Province
NDABIRABE Gelase Daniel	M	CNDD-FDD	Hutu	Kayanza Province
NDARUVUKANYE Zénon	M	CNDD-FDD	Hutu	Bujumbura Province
NDAYISENGA Bernard	M	CNL	Hutu	Bujumbura Mairie Province
NDAYISHIMIYE Marie Rose	F	CNDD-FDD	Tutsi	Muyinga Province
NDAYIZEYE Anicet	M	CNDD-FDD	Tutsi	Kayanza Province
NDIKUMAGENGE Antoinette	F	CNL	Hutu	Cankuzo Province
NDIKUMANA Evariste	M	ASSEJEBA	Twa	Bujumbura Mairie Province
NDIZEYE Dieudonné	M	CNDD-FDD	Tutsi	Karusi Province
NDUWAYO Gilbert	M	CNDD-FDD	Hutu	Makamba Province
NDUWIMANA Bernardine	F	CNDD-FDD	Tutsi	Mwaro Province
NDUWIMANA Deo	M	CNDD-FDD	Hutu	Rumonge Province
NDUWIMANA Hassan	M	CNDD-FDD	Hutu	Muyinga Province
NDUWIMANA Nicodème	M	CNL	Hutu	Muramvya Province
NDUWIMANA Patricie	F	CNDD-FDD	Hutu	Kayanza Province
NGENDAKUMANA Solène	F	CNDD-FDD	Tutsi	Rumonge Province
NGENDAKUMANA Sylvestre	M	CNDD-FDD	Tutsi	Kayanza Province
NIBIZI Antoinette	F	CNDD-FDD	Tutsi	Kirundo Province
NIBIZI Epimeny	M	CNDD-FDD	Tutsi	Ngozi Province
NIHORIMBERE Agrippine	F	CNL	Tutsi	Rumonge Province
NIJIMBERE Céline	F	CNDD-FDD	Tutsi	Karusi Province
NIJIMBERE Onesphore	M	CNL	Hutu	Makamba Province
NIMUBONA Jean Claude	M	CNDD-FDD	Tutsi	Muramvya Province
NIRAGIRA Silas	M	CNDD-FDD	Hutu	Muramvya Province
NIRAGIRA Violette	F	CNDD-FDD	Hutu	Kayanza Province
NISHIMWE Bénigne	F	CNDD-FDD	Hutu	Kirundo Province
NITANGA Célestin	M	CNDD-FDD	Hutu	Rumonge Province
NIVYABANDI Martin	M	CNDD-FDD	Tutsi	Muyinga Province
NIYIBITANGA Neema	F	UNIPROBA	Twa	Cibitoke Province
NIYITUNGA Alice	F	CNDD-FDD	Hutu	Cibitoke Province
NIYOBUHUNGIRO Justin	M	CNDD-FDD	Hutu	Cibitoke Province
NIYONKURU Alodie	F	CNDD-FDD	Hutu	Cankuzo Province
NIYONKURU Pélate	F	CNL	Hutu	Kayanza Province
NIYONSABA Marie Rose	F	CNDD-FDD	Hutu	Ruyigi Province
NIYONZIMA Constantin	M	CNDD-FDD	Hutu	Ngozi Province
NIYONZIMA Jean Baptiste	M	CNDD-DD	Tutsi	Bubanza Province
NIZIGAMA Sylvie	F	CNDD-FDD	Hutu	Bubanza Province
NIZIGIYIMANA Fébronie	M	CNDD-FDD	Tutsi	Muramvya Province
NKENYEREYE Constantin	M	CNDD-FDD	Tutsi	Ruyigi Province
NKUNDWANABAKE Sylvain	M	CNDD-FDD	Hutu	Cibitoke Province
NKURUNZIZA Jacqueline	F	CNDD-FDD	Hutu	Ngozi Province
NKURUNZIZA Jocky Chantal	F	CNDD-FDD	Tutsi	Ruyigi Province
NSABIMANA Ritha	F	CNDD-FDD	Hutu	Kirundo Province
NSHIMIRIMANA Jean	M	CNDD-FDD	Tutsi	Muyinga Province
NTACOBAKIMVUNA Marie Immaculée	F	CNL	Hutu	Gitega Province
NTAGAHORAHO Jeanne Marie	F	CNDD-FDD	Tutsi	Gitega Province
NTAHONTUYE Nestor	M	CNDD-FDD	Hutu	Ruyigi Province
NTAKARUTIMANA Sabine	F	CNDD-FDD	Hutu	Muyinga Province
NTAKIYIRUTA Obed	M	CNL	Hutu	Rumonge Province
NTIRAMPEBA Anicet	M	CNDD-FDD	Tutsi	Kayanza Province
NTISUMBWA Dévote	F	CNDD-FDD	Tutsi	Makamba Province
NYANDWI Bède	M	CNL	Hutu	Rutana Province
NZEYIMANA Zaïnabu	M	CNDD-FDD	Hutu	Gitega Province
RUGEMA charles	M	CNL	Tutsi	Karusi Province
RWASA Agathon	M	CNL	Hutu	Ngozi Province
RWASA Catherine	F	CNDD-FDD	Tutsi	Kirundo Province
SINDAYIGAYA Jean Baptiste	M	UJEDECO	Twa	Kirundo Province
SINDAYIKENGERA Apollinaire	M	CNDD-FDD	Hutu	Mwaro Province
SINDIMWO Gaston	M	UPRONA	Tutsi	Bujumbura Mairie Province
SINZINKAYO Jean Pierre	M	CNDD-FDD	Tutsi	Bujumbura Province
SINZINKAYO Venant	M	CNDD-FDD	Hutu	Gitega Province
SUGURU Olivier	M	CNDD-FDD	Tutsi	Bubanza Province

== Sources ==
- Burundi National Assembly Election results, Inter-Parliamentary Union
- Liste actualisée le 08 mai 2023 (in French), National Assembly of Burundi
