= Gervais Ndirakobuca =

Prime Minister of Burundi from 2022 to 2025

President of the Senate of Burundi
- Incumbent
- Assumed office 5 August 2025
- President: Évariste Ndayishimiye
- Preceded by: Emmanuel Sinzohagera

9th Prime Minister of Burundi
- In office 7 September 2022 – 5 August 2025
- President: Évariste Ndayishimiye
- Preceded by: Alain-Guillaume Bunyoni
- Succeeded by: Nestor Ntahontuye

Minister of the Interior
- In office June 2020 – 7 September 2022
- President: Évariste Ndayishimiye
- Preceded by: Alain-Guillaume Bunyoni
- Succeeded by: Martin Niteretse

Personal details
- Born: 1970 (age 55–56) Bukinanyana, Cibitoke Province, Burundi
- Party: CNDD–FDD
- Occupation: Politician
- Nickname: Ndakugarika
- Police career
- Allegiance: Burundi National Police
- Service years: 2005-2025
- Rank: Lieutenant General
- Military career
- Allegiance: CNDD–FDD
- Service years: ? – 2003
- Conflicts: Burundian Civil War

Gervais Ndirakobuca (born 1970) is a Burundian politician, retired police lieutenant general and former rebel commander serving as the President of the Senate of Burundi since 5 August 2025. Prior to that, he was the Prime Minister of Burundi from 7 September 2022 until 5 August 2025. And prior to that, he was the Minister of Interior, Public Security, and Community Development. He is known for his violent crackdown of the 2015 civil protest in Burundi and was under United States and European Union sanctions for human rights violations when President Évariste Ndayishimiye appointed him security minister.

== Biography ==
Gervais Ndirakobuca was born in 1970 in Bukinanyana in the Cibitoke Province of Burundi.

He was a rebel commander during the Burundian Civil War that ended in 2005. His nickname was "Ndakugarika" meaning 'I will kill you' in the Kirundi language. After the civil war ended, he joined the National Police of Burundi and rose to the rank of Commissioner (lieutenant-general). He was addressed as General.

As police commissioner, he deployed excessive force to quell the 2015 civil protests that followed the amendment of the constitution which gave President Pierre Nkurunziza the legal right to run for a third term. Sanctions were imposed on Ndirakobuca by the United States, the United Kingdom, France, Switzerland and the European Union for "acts of violence, acts of repression and violations of international human rights law against protesters … on 26, 27 and 28 April in the Nyakabiga and Musaga districts in Bujumbura". At least 1,700 people were killed during the protest. International Criminal Court opened an investigation against government officials involved in the crackdown including Ndirakobuca.

Despite this, Ndayishimiye appointed him to a powerful position of Minister of Interior in June 2020, making Ndirakobuca the most internationally sanctioned member of Burundi national government cabinet. He was seen as a de facto deputy prime minister or 'super minister' with his overwhelming portfolio across three key ministries of Interior, Security, and Community Development in the Nkurunziza's government, but was merged into a single ministry by Ndayishimiye and given to Ndirakobuca.

Ndirakobuca became prime minister of Burundi on 7 September 2022, replacing incumbent Prime Minister Alain-Guillaume Bunyoni, after Ndayishimiye warned that a coup d'état was being planned against his government. Ndirakobuca was unanimously voted to the position by the parliament.

After the Senate election of 23 July 2025, he was elected member of the senate for the new Province of Bujumbura. He was elected on 5 August 2025 as President of the Senate. Alongside him, Générose Ngendanganya was elected 1st Vice President of the Senate and Clotilde Kampimbare as 2nd Vice President of the Senate. All of them were elected for a 5 year term.

Political offices
Preceded by Emmanuel Sinzohagera	President of the Senate of Burundi; 2025–Today	Succeeded by

Political offices
Preceded by Alain-Guillaume Bunyoni	Prime Minister of Burundi; 2022–2025	Succeeded by Nestor Ntahontuye
