= FDD =

FDD may refer to:

== Politics ==
- CNDD-FDD, a political party in Burundi
- Forum for Democracy and Development, a political party in Zambia
- KAZE-FDD, a political party in Burundi

== Science and technology ==
- Familial Danish dementia, a rare form of dementia
- Floppy disk drive
- Frequency-division duplex, a telecommunications duplex indexing method
- Frequency domain decomposition, a system identification technique
- LTE-FDD, a 4G telecommunications technology and standard
- Timex FDD, a nearly complete computer by Timex
- UMTS-FDD, an air interface standard in 3G mobile telecommunications networks
- Fault detection and diagnostics, by Automated Logic Corporation

== Other uses ==
- Feature-driven development, a project management approach
- Forces for the Defense of Democracy, a rebel group in Burundi
- Foundation for Defense of Democracies, a policy institute based in Washington, D.C., US
- Franchise disclosure document (2008), UFDD/UFOC Uniform Franchise Offering Circular
- The Danish Scout Council, formerly the Fællesrådet for Danmarks Drengespejdere
- "F.D.D.", the opening theme to the anime Chaos;Head sung by Kanako Itō
