= 2020 Burundian general election =

- 20 May 2020
- Presidential election
- Registered: 5,113,418
- Turnout: 73.44% (▲14.27pp)
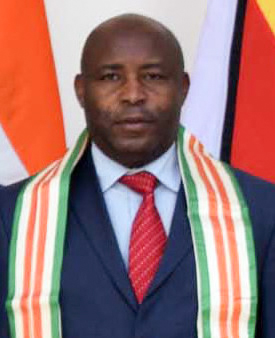

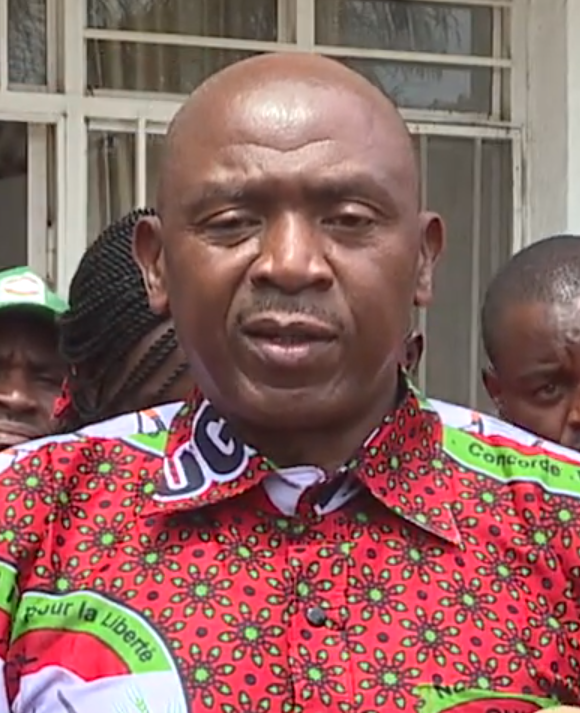
Nominee	Évariste Ndayishimiye	Agathon Rwasa
Party	CNDD–FDD	CNL
Popular vote	3,082,210	1,084,788
Percentage	71.45%	25.15%
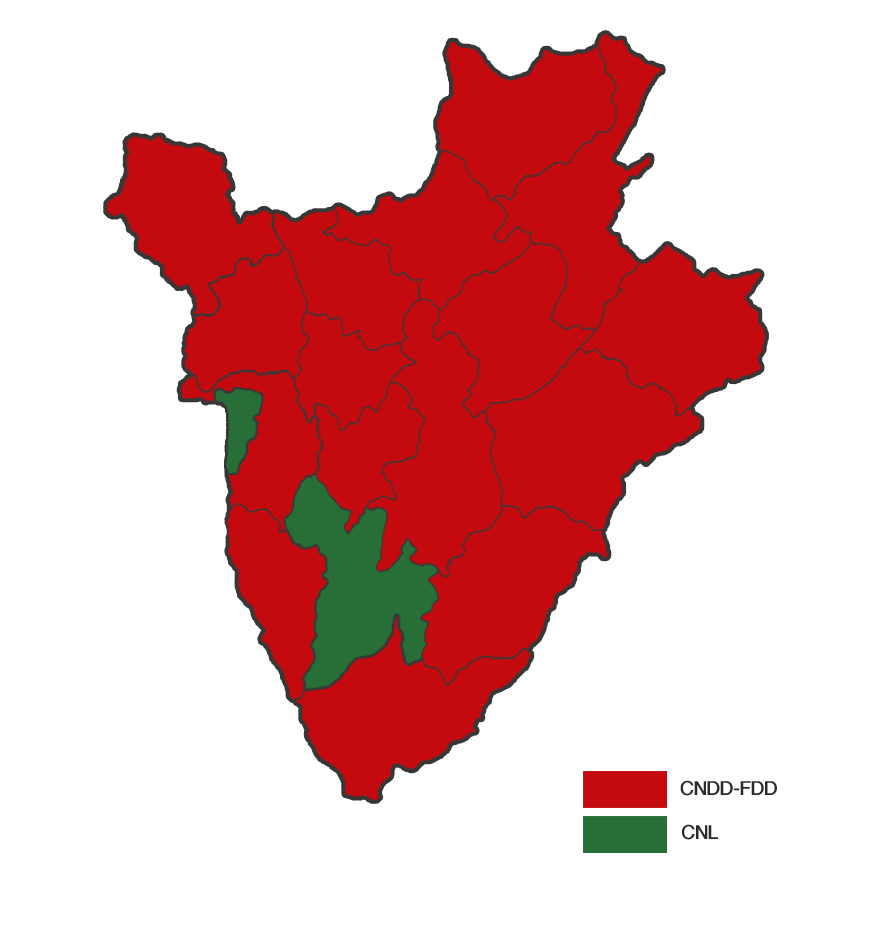
- Results by province
President before election
Pierre Nkurunziza
CNDD–FDD
Elected President
Évariste Ndayishimiye
CNDD–FDD
- National Assembly election
- Turnout: 87.31% (▲12.99pp)
Party	Leader	Vote %	Seats	+/–
CNDD–FDD	Évariste Ndayishimiye	70.98	86	0
CNL	Agathon Rwasa	23.41	32	New
UPRONA	Gaston Sindimwo	2.54	2	0
This lists parties that won seats. See the complete results below.

General elections were held in Burundi on 20 May 2020 to elect both the president and the National Assembly. Évariste Ndayishimiye of the ruling CNDD–FDD was elected president with 71% of the vote. In the National Assembly elections, the CNDD–FDD won 72 of the 100 elected seats.

== Electoral system ==
The president is elected for a seven-year term using the two-round system. If no candidate receives a majority of the vote in the first round, a second round will be held. 100 members of the National Assembly are elected for a five-year term from 18 multi-member constituencies based on the provinces using the closed list proportional representation system. Seats are allocated using the d'Hondt method with a national 2% electoral threshold. A further three members of the Twa ethnic group are appointed, and more members are co-opted to ensure a 60–40 split between Hutus and Tutsis, and a 30% quota for female MPs.

== Campaign ==
Incumbent President Pierre Nkurunziza, in power since 2005, announced in December 2018 that he would not contest the elections. In response, the main opposition alliance, CNARED, announced that they would return from exile in Belgium to participate in the elections for the first time since 2005.

In January 2020, the CNDD–FDD chose the party's secretary general Évariste Ndayishimiye as its presidential candidate. In February, the National Congress for Liberty selected Agathon Rwasa as their candidate.

Gaston Sindimwo, the First Vice President of Burundi, announced he would run as the Union for National Progress nominee.

Dieudonné Nahimana, Léonce Ngendakumana, Francis Rohero and Domitien Ndayizeye also ran in the elections.

== Conduct ==
In December 2017, the government introduced a voluntary election levy. However, Human Rights Watch accused the youth wing of the ruling CNDD–FDD and local government officials of extorting the money from citizens in the buildup to the elections, sometimes demanding the donation multiple times.

According to the Burundi Human Rights Initiative, election day was marred by irregularities including the arrests of opposition leaders and people voting multiple times. Long queues formed at polling stations.

== Results ==
=== President ===
Candidate	Party	Votes	%
Évariste Ndayishimiye	CNDD–FDD	3,082,210	71.45
Agathon Rwasa	National Congress for Liberty	1,084,788	25.15
Gaston Sindimwo	Union for National Progress	73,353	1.70
Domitien Ndayizeye	Kira Burundi Coalition	24,470	0.57
Léonce Ngendakumana	Front for Democracy in Burundi	21,232	0.49
Dieudonné Nahimana	Independent	18,709	0.43
Francis Rohero	Independent	8,942	0.21
Total		4,313,704	100.00
Valid votes		4,313,704	96.18
Invalid/blank votes		171,224	3.82
Total votes		4,484,928	100.00
Registered voters/turnout		5,113,418	87.71
Source: CENI

=== National Assembly ===
The three Twa representatives were from the ASSEJEBA, UJEDECO and UNIPROBA parties.

Party	Votes	%	Seats			
Party	Votes	%	Elected	Co-opted	Total	+/–
CNDD–FDD	3,036,286	70.98	72	14	86	0
National Congress for Liberty	1,001,230	23.41	27	5	32	New
Union for National Progress	108,865	2.54	1	1	2	0
Front for Democracy in Burundi	31,106	0.73	0	0	0	New
National Forces of Liberation	17,842	0.42	0	0	0	0
Front for Democracy in Burundi–Nyakuri	15,547	0.36	0	0	0	0
Kira Burundi Coalition	10,072	0.24	0	0	0	New
Alliance for Peace, Democracy and Reconciliation	6,623	0.15	0	0	0	New
COPA 2020	2,599	0.06	0	0	0	New
Council of Patriots	2,371	0.06	0	0	0	New
Union for Peace and Democracy	2,311	0.05	0	0	0	0
Party for Democracy and Reconciliation	2,142	0.05	0	0	0	0
National People's Front–Imbonenza	1,399	0.03	0	0	0	New
Independents	39,261	0.92	0	0	0	New
Co-opted Twa members			–	3	3	0
Total	4,277,654	100.00	100	23	123	+2
Valid votes	4,277,654	95.82				
Invalid/blank votes	186,705	4.18				
Total votes	4,464,359	100.00				
Registered voters/turnout	5,113,418	87.31				
Source: CENI

== Reactions ==
=== Domestic ===
- Conference of Bishops of Burundi: Issued a statement criticizing the transparency and freedom of the election process. The church deployed around 2,716 observers across Burundi's 119 municipalities. The conference's observers witnessed intimidation and expulsion of opposition observers from the polling and vote counting stations. The church condemned the ruling party for engaging in national election fraud.
- National Congress for Liberty: The main opposition party filed a case at the Constitutional Court of Burundi challenging the elections and accusing the ruling factions of electoral fraud. The party says they have various instances of evidence where ballot stuffing was conducted. The party aims to take the case to the East African Court of Justice if they are unsuccessful.

=== International ===
Due to the travel restrictions imposed by COVID-19 pandemic, there were almost no international observers present in the country.

- East African Community: Gave the election a clean bill and expressed its support towards Burundi holding peaceful elections. The body issued a statement saying that "The 2020 Burundi elections hold an iconic place in the history of the nation, marking this the first peaceful and democratic transfer of power. More significantly, the process was domestically driven through own funding. The peaceful conclusion of the electoral process will not only be a big win for the people of Burundi, but for the East African Community as a region."
- Amnesty International: Condemned the conditions leading up to the election saying "There were continued reports of killings, arbitrary arrests, beatings and disappearances of opposition members, as well as social media censorship on election day."
