= 1993 Burundian presidential election =

- 1 June 1993
- Registered: 2,355,126
- Turnout: 97.31%
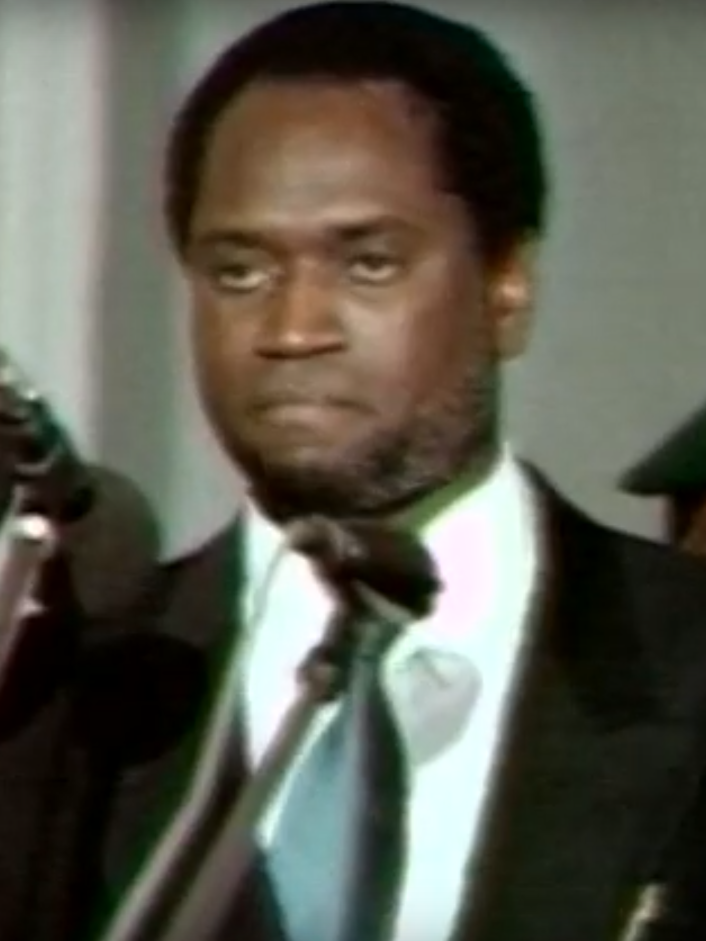

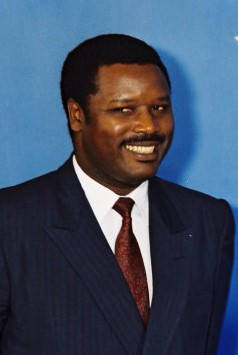
Nominee	Melchior Ndadaye	Pierre Buyoya
Party	FRODEBU	UPRONA
Popular vote	1,483,904	742,360
Percentage	65.68%	32.86%
- Results by province
President before election
Pierre Buyoya
UPRONA
Elected President
Melchior Ndadaye
FRODEBU

Presidential elections were held in Burundi on 1 June 1993 following the approval of a new constitution in a referendum the previous year. They were the first multi-party elections for the presidency, the only previous elections in 1984 having been held at a time when the country was a one-party state. They were also only the second contested national elections held in the country since independence in 1962.

Three candidates entered the contest, with Melchior Ndadaye of the Front for Democracy in Burundi defeating incumbent President Pierre Buyoya with 66% of the vote. Voter turnout was 97%.

This election was a watershed for Burundi. It represented the end of the military-backed Tutsi-dominated state that had been in place since 1966, and the first peaceful transfer of power in the country’s republican history.

== Candidates ==
- Pierre Buyoya, the incumbent president who seized power in a 1987 military coup. A Tutsi from Bururi Province, he was the candidate for the ruling Union for National Progress. He ran on a platform of national unity and was supported by two predominantly Tutsi parties, the Rally for Democracy and Economic and Social Development (RADDES) and the Social Democratic Party.
- Melchior Ndadaye', the leader and candidate of the Front for Democracy in Burundi (FRODEBU), a predominantly Hutu party founded in 1986 and officially registered in 1992. Ndadaye's candidacy was supported by three other mainly Hutu parties - the Rally for the People of Burundi (RPB), the People's Party (PP), and the Liberal Party (PL).
- Pierre-Claver Sendegeya, a Hutu and candidate of the monarchist People's Reconciliation Party (PRP).

== Results ==
Candidate	Party	Votes	%
Melchior Ndadaye	Front for Democracy in Burundi	1,483,904	65.68
Pierre Buyoya	Union for National Progress	742,360	32.86
Pierre-Claver Sendegeya	People's Reconciliation Party	33,072	1.46
Total		2,259,336	100.00
Valid votes		2,259,336	98.59
Invalid/blank votes		32,410	1.41
Total votes		2,291,746	100.00
Registered voters/turnout		2,355,126	97.31
Source: EISA

== Aftermath ==
Melchior Ndadaye's election victory put FRODEBU in prime position for a comfortable win in the parliamentary election held on 29 June 1993.

Ndadaye was sworn in as the first Hutu president of Burundi on 10 July 1993. His rule would be short, however, as he was assassinated on 21 October 1993 during a military coup attempt by elements of the predominantly Tutsi army. Thereafter, the country plunged into a full-scale civil war that claimed hundreds of thousands of lives.
