= Burundian elections, 2010 =

Burundian elections of 2010 may refer to:

- Burundian presidential election, 2010
- Burundian legislative election, 2010
