= 1992 Burundian constitutional referendum =

- 9 March 1992

Results
Choice	Votes	%
Yes	2,003,411	90.42%
No	212,285	9.58%
Valid votes	2,215,696	99.88%
Invalid or blank votes	2,753	0.12%
Total votes	2,218,449	100.00%
Registered voters/turnout	2,287,554	96.98%

A constitutional referendum was held in Burundi on 9 March 1992. It followed the 1991 referendum on the Charter of National Unity, which gave the government a mandate to draw up a new constitution. The resulting document created a presidential republic with unlimited five-year term for candidates, introduced proportional representation as the method for electing the Parliament, guaranteed freedom of the press and human rights, and the requirement for registered political parties to accept the Charter of National Unity.

Approved by 90% of voters with a 97% turnout, the new constitution was promulgated on 13 March. The first elections held under the new constitution took place the following year, with presidential elections on 1 June and parliamentary elections on 29 June.

== Results ==
Choice	Votes	%
For	2,003,411	90.42
Against	212,285	9.58
Total	2,215,696	100.00
Valid votes	2,215,696	99.80
Invalid/blank votes	4,337	0.20
Total votes	2,220,033	100.00
Registered voters/turnout	2,287,554	97.05
Source: Nohlen et al.
