= 2005 Burundian presidential election =

Indirect presidential election in Burundi

← October 1994	19 August 2005	2010 →

162 members of the Parliament of Burundi 108 votes needed to win
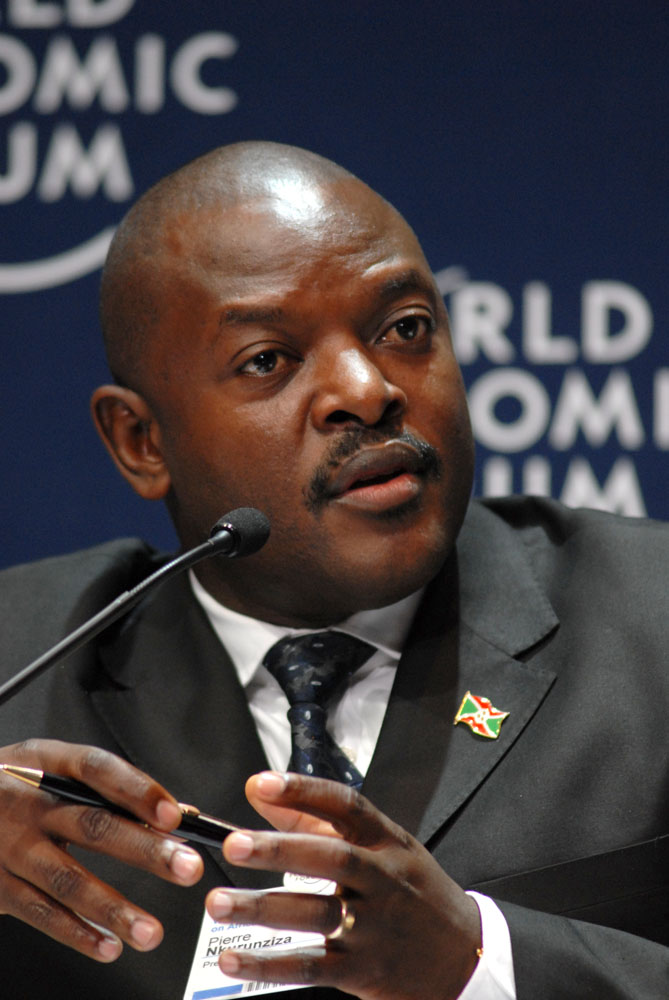
Nominee	Pierre Nkurunziza
Party	CNDD–FDD
Electoral vote	151
Percentage	94.38%
President before election
Domitien Ndayizeye
FRODEBU
Elected President
Pierre Nkurunziza
CNDD–FDD

Indirect presidential elections were held in Burundi on 19 August 2005. Members of the National Assembly and Senate chose the new president of the republic for a five-year term. The sole candidate, Pierre Nkurunziza of the CNDD–FDD, was elected by a vote of 151–9. Nkurunziza was sworn in on 26 August 2005.

== Electoral system ==
The election was held using the multiple round system. In order to win in the first round of voting, Nkurunziza was required to receive at least two-thirds of the vote (108 votes).

== Results ==
Candidate	Party	Votes	%
Pierre Nkurunziza	CNDD–FDD	151	94.38
Against		9	5.62
Total		160	100.00
Valid votes		160	99.38
Invalid/blank votes		1	0.62
Total votes		161	100.00
Registered voters/turnout		162	99.38
Source: African Elections Database
