= Burundi Human Rights Initiative =

The Burundi Human Rights Initiative (BHRI) is an independent, non-profit and non-government human rights organization. It was founded in the buildup to 2020 Burundian general elections to expose and keep accurate records of human rights violations that would help bring perpetrators of violence to justice. BHRI investigations cover human rights abuses by Burundian government and armed opposition groups. In January 2020, BHRI released a report titled a Facade of Peace in the Land of Fear which detailed wide spread human rights violations by Burundian government and armed opposition groups.
