= Léonard Nyangoma =

Burundian politician

Léonard Nyangoma (born 31 December 1952) is a Burundian politician and former rebel leader.

== Early life ==
Léonard Nyangoma was born on 31 December 1952 in Rutundwe, Bururi Province, Burundi. He graduated from the University of Burundi in 1979 with a degree in mathematics.

== Career ==
Following his graduation from the university, Nyangoma was appointed prefect of studies at the Normal School of Rutovu, where he worked until 1988. He also served as the school's head athletic trainer. From 1980 to 1988 he served as the head of the Bururi chapter of the Union Syndicale des Travailleurs du Burundi (UTB). From then until 1991 he served as UTB's deputy secretary general.

Nyangoma was a founding member of the Front pour la Démocratie au Burundi (FRODEBU). In the June 1993 legislative elections he won a seat in the National Assembly, representing the Bururi constituency. He managed FRODEBU leader Melchior Ndadaye's presidential campaign. Ndadaye won the presidential election and appointed Nyangoma as Minister of Refugee Repatriation. Early in the morning on 21 October 1993 members of the Burundian Army launched a coup attempt and attacked the presidential palace. Nyangoma went to the home of Déo Ngendahayo, brother of Minister of Communications Jean‐Marie Ngendahayo. Ngendahayo placed several phone calls to Army Chief of Staff Jean Bikomagu, but the three men grew suspicious of his motives and decided to relocate, going to the warehouse of a Belgian businessman. They later sought shelter at the French embassy. Under President Cyprien Ntaryamira Nyangoma served as Minister of State in charge of the Interior and Public Security.

On 24 September 1994 Nyangoma founded a FRODEBU-breakaway exile group, the Conseil National Pour la Défense de la Démocratie (CNDD). The CNDD then made an alliance with the Forces pour la Défense de la Démocratie (FDD), a rebel group, creating the CNDD-FDD. Nyangoma returned to Burundi in February 2005, the last rebel leader of the war to do so. That year he was elected to the communal council of Songa and in the subsequent legislative elections was re-elected to the National Assembly for the Bururi constituency to serve a five-year term. On 31 July 2015 he was made head of the Conseil national pour le respect de l'accord d'Arusha et de l'état de droit (CNARED), a political grouping dedicated to opposing President Pierre Nkurunziza's attempt to seek a third term.

== Works cited ==
- Krueger, Robert; Krueger, Kathleen Tobin (2007). From Bloodshed to Hope in Burundi : Our Embassy Years During Genocide (PDF). University of Texas Press. ISBN 9780292714861.
