= Feruzi =

Feruzi is a surname. Notable people with the surname include:

- Camille Feruzi, Congolese musician
- Zedi Feruzi, Burundian politician
