= Dévote Faida =

Burundian politician (born 1983)

Dévote Faida (born 1983) is a politician who was elected Senator for the Kirundo Province, Burundi in 2020.

== Senator ==
On 28 July 2020, the Constitutional Court of Burundi confirmed that Dévote Faida had been elected to the Senate as Hutu representative for Kirundo Province. She ran on the platform of the National Council for the Defense of Democracy – Forces for the Defense of Democracy (CNDD-FDD) party. Dévote Faida was appointed President of the Standing Committee in charge of Gender Issues and Relations with the Legislative Assembly of the East African Community.

On 30 November 2021, she closed the exchange and evaluation workshop on the process of fighting against early marriages and unwanted pregnancies for students, in the chief-town of Karuzi Province. Sessions had also been held in Ngozi, Rutana and Bujumbura city. The workshops had been organized by the Senate of Burundi with support from the Independent National Commission on Human Rights (CNIDH) and the United Nations Children's Fund (UNICEF). Recommendations had been given to the Senate of Burundi, the government, and to the legal, educations and religious institutions.

On 8 September 2023, the members of the Permanent Commission in charge of gender issues and relations met in the Burundian Senate with various heads of provincial services, with the aim of collecting information in relation to gender-based violence. As president of the commission, Dévote Faida call for all participants to work together to eradicate this scourge.

== Sources ==
- Arret RCCB 395 du 28 Juillet 2020 (PDF), La Cour Constitutionelle, 28 July 2020
- Closure of the exchange and evaluation workshop on the process of combating early marriages and unwanted Pregnancies in schools, 30 November 2021
- Des violences basées sur le genre encore visibles (in French), Agence Burundaise de Presse, 21 September 2023
- Nkurunziza, Moise (17 September 2021), "Le Sénat engagé à assurer la promotion des filles et femmes burundaises", Le Renouveau
