= Independents of Hope =

Political party alliance in Burundi

Independents of Hope (Kirundi: Abigenga-Mizero y'Abarundi; French: Indépendants de l'Espoir) is a political alliance in Burundi.

== History ==
The alliance was formed in November 2014 by former National Forces of Liberation leader Agathon Rwasa and former Union for National Progress head Charles Nditije after they were expelled from their parties. In the June 2015 parliamentary elections it received 11% of the vote, winning 21 of the 100 elected seats in the National Assembly. In the July 2015 presidential elections the alliance nominated Rwasa as its candidate. He finished second to incumbent Pierre Nkurunziza with 19% of the vote.

The alliance was included in the government formed by Nkurunziza, with five of the 20 positions in the cabinet.
