= National Council for the Defense of Democracy =

Political party in Burundi

National Council for the Defense of Democracy Conseil National Pour la Défense de la Démocratie
- Abbreviation: CNDD
- President: Léonard Nyangoma
- Founded: 24 September 1994; 31 years ago
- Split from: Front for Democracy in Burundi
- Ideology: Hutu interests
- Colors: Blue, Red, Green
- Anthem: "CNDD ni Inama y'Igihugu"
- Senate: 0 / 13
- National Assembly: 0 / 111

Party flag

The National Council for the Defense of Democracy (French: Conseil National Pour la Défense de la Démocratie, CNDD) is a political party in Burundi.

== History ==
The CNDD was established in Zaire on 24 September 1994 and was initially led by Léonard Nyangoma. The party also established an armed wing, the Forces for the Defence of Democracy, which was involved in the country's ethnic conflict. In the early 2000s the party split, with a faction led by Pierre Nkurunziza becoming the National Council for the Defense of Democracy – Forces for the Defense of Democracy (CNDD–FDD), which went on to become the ruling party. The CNDD held two ministerial posts in a unity government formed in 2001.

In the 2005 parliamentary elections on 4 July the party received 4% of the vote, winning four of the 118 seats in the National Assembly, whilst the CNDD–FDD won 64. It had performed strongly in local elections in June in Bururi, Nyangoma's home province, receiving 4.2% of the national vote and winning 135 of the 3,225 local council seats across the country. It subsequently won a single seat in the indirect Senate elections on 29 July, which was elected by colleges of local councillors, and gained an additional two co-opted seats. However, Nyangoma went into exile the following year, before returning in 2007.

On 1 June 2010 the party was one of several that withdrew from the presidential elections scheduled for 28 June, accusing the Independent National Elections Commission of incompetence and a lack of impartiality. Following the elections, Nyangoma went into exile again, fearing that his parliamentary immunity would be lifted. The CNDD did not participate in the parliamentary elections on 23 July 2010.
