= Emmanuel Sinzohagera =

Burundian politician, president of the senate

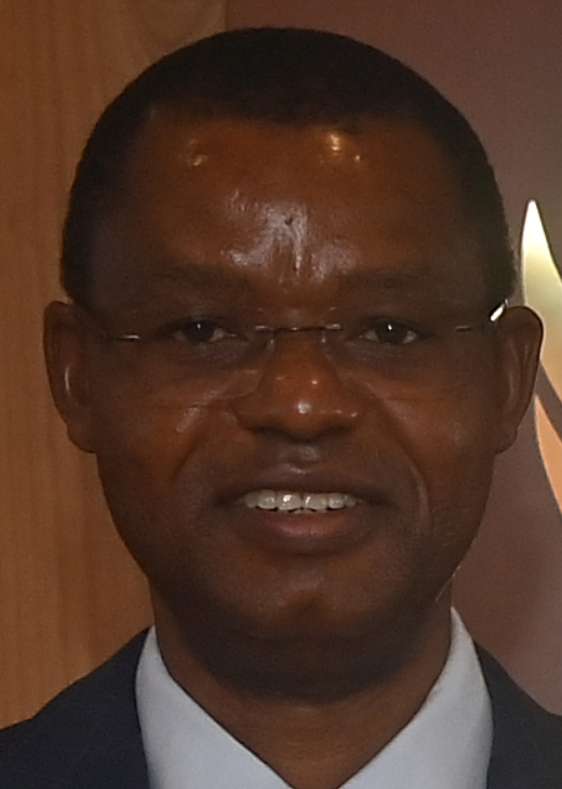
- Sinzohagera in Vienna in September 2021

Senator for Bujumbura Province, Burundi
- In office 2020–2025
- Succeeded by: Gervais Ndirakobuca

President of the Senate of Burundi
- In office 25 August 2020 – 5 August 2025
- Preceded by: Révérien Ndikuriyo
- Succeeded by: Gervais Ndirakobuca

Personal details
- Born: 24 March 1974 (age 52)

Bishop Emmanuel Sinzohagera is a pastor and politician who was elected Senator for Bujumbura Province, Burundi in July 2020. He was elected president of the Senate in August 2020 until 5 August 2025.

== Background ==
Emmanuel Sinzohagera was born on 24 March 1974. He is a native of Bujumbura province. Bishop Emmanuel Sinzohagera became responsible for development within the National Council for the Defense of Democracy - Front for the Defense of Democracy (CNDD-FDD).

== Senate leader ==
Emmanuel Sinzohagera was indirectly elected to the Senate for Bujumbura Province on 20 July 2020 on the CNDD-FDD ticket. He was elected President of the Senate on 25 August 2020 in Gitega, the political capital of Burundi, by 38 out of 39 votes. He succeeded Révérien Ndikuriyo, from Makamba Province, who had been president since 2015.

In May 2023 Sinzohagera and Daniel Gélase Ndabirabe, speaker of the National Assembly, participated in a meeting of the presidents of the parliaments of East African Community (EAC) member countries, held in Arusha, Tanzania. They discussed the process of amending the treaty governing the EAC, which should be discussed by the EAC heads of states. They also discussed creation of a general secretariat of the East African Legislative Assembly (EALA) to help it collaborate with the national parliaments.

On 21 November 2023 Sinzohagera received a courtesy visit from Elisabetta Pietrobon, head of the European Union delegation to Burundi. This confirmed normalization of relations between the EU and Burundu, which had been ruptured in 2015. Pietrobon said the EU would support the government's development goals.

== Church leader ==
In April 2024 Rev. Emmanuel Sinzohagera of the United Methodist Church's Burundi Conference attended the General Conference of the church in Charlotte, North Carolina, United States. He spoke in favor of a plan that would allow different geographical regions such as North America and Africa to make their own rules about the ministry. He said "What matters in Africa may not necessarily matters to ... the U.S. church, and what matters to you as church may not necessarily matter to the African Church."

Political offices
Preceded by Révérien Ndikuriyo	President of the Senate of Burundi; 2020-2025	Succeeded by Gervais Ndirakobuca

== Sources ==
- Burundi Senate Election Results, IPU: Inter-Parliamentary Union
- "Burundi Senate President Emmanuel Sinzohagera and National Assembly Speaker Daniel Gélase Ndabirabe have returned from the 15th meeting of the Bureau of the Speakers of EAC member parliaments", BNA: Burundi News Agency, 24 May 2023
- DeRose, Jason (26 April 2024), "United Methodist Church begins reorganization over LGBTQ+ issues", CapRadio
- Pepi Mbabaye (April 2021), "2021 Burundi Special Annual Conference", UM News
- Senators list (in French), Senate of Burundi
- Sindihebura, Desire (25 August 2020), "Emmanuel Sinzohagera, un religieux élu à la tête du Sénat", IWACU (in French)
- "The president of the Senate received in audience the ambassador of the European Union to Burundi", ABP: Burundi News Agency, 24 November 2023
