= Nestor Ntahontuye =

Prime Minister of Burundi since 2025

10th Prime Minister of Burundi
- Incumbent
- Assumed office 5 August 2025
- President: Évariste Ndayishimiye
- Preceded by: Gervais Ndirakobuca

Minister of Finance and Economic Planning
- In office 12 December 2024 – 5 August 2025
- Preceded by: Audace Niyonzima
- Succeeded by: Alain Ndikumana

Member of the Parliament of Burundi
- In office 2020–2024
- Constituency: Buhumuza (in the former Ruyigi Province)

Personal details
- Born: 1978 (age 47–48)
- Education: University of Burundi
- Profession: Politician

Nestor Ntahontuye (born 1978) is a Burundian politician who is the current Prime Minister of Burundi serving since 5 August 2025. He previously served as Minister of Finance and Economic Planning from December 2024 until his appointment as Prime Minister. He has also served as a member of the Parliament of Burundi, representing Ruyigi Province, since 2020.

== Biography ==
Ntahontuye was born in 1978. He attended the University of Burundi and graduated with a master's degree in statistics. He worked as a planner and researcher for several organizations, including for CARE International, Oxfam and the Global Fund. In 2020, he was elected a member of the Parliament of Burundi, representing Ruyigi Province in the eastern part of the country. After being elected, he chaired the parliamentary committee on monitoring public resource management, finance, economic affairs and national planning.

On 9 December 2024, Burundian President Évariste Ndayishimiye appointed Ntahontuye to be the new Minister of Finance and Economic Planning, replacing the dismissed Audace Niyonzima. His appointment came at after the Burundi Revenue Office reported a deficit of 110 billion Burundian francs. He assumed office on 12 December. He served eight months as Burundi's finance minister before being appointed by Ndayishimiye as the new Prime Minister of Burundi on 5 August 2025. He was sworn into office the same day. Ntahontuye replaced Gervais Ndirakobuca, who left the position to become the new President of the Senate.

Political offices
Preceded by Gervais Ndirakobuca	Prime Minister of Burundi; 2025–Today	Succeeded by

Political offices
Preceded by Audace Niyonzima	Minister of Finance and Economic Planning; 2024–2025	Succeeded by Dr. Alain Ndikumana
