= List of presidents of the Senate of Burundi =

List of presidents of the Senate of Burundi, who is the presiding officer in the Senate of Burundi. The President is elected by the members of the Senate for a five-year term.

Below is a list of office-holders:

Name	Took office	Left office	Party	Notes
Joseph Bamina	September 1965	December 1965	UPRONA	
No Senate	1966	2002		
Libère Bararunyeretse	2002	2005	UPRONA	President of transitional Senate
Gervais Rufyikiri	17 August 2005	2010	CNDD-FDD	
Gabriel Ntisezerana	August 2010	August 2015	CNDD-FDD	
Révérien Ndikuriyo	14 August 2015	25 August 2020	CNDD-FDD	
Emmanuel Sinzohagera	25 August 2020	5 August 2025	CNDD-FDD	
Gervais Ndirakobuca	5 August 2025	Present	CNDD-FDD	

== See also ==
- List of presidents of the National Assembly of Burundi
