= Ernest Kabushemeye =

Burundian politician (died 1995)

Ernest Kabushemeye (died March 11, 1995) was a Burundian politician and the Minister for Mines and Energy department. He led the Rally for the People of Burundi (RPB), legalized as a political party in 1992, and held several government positions before being assassinated on 11 March 1995.

His motto was "Nturenganywe" meaning "don't get your rights stomped on". He was a fighter of democracy.
