= Edouard Nduwimana =

Burundian politician

Edouard Nduwimana is a Burundian politician and a former Minister of Home Affairs and Ombudsman of the Republic of Burundi from 2011 to 2016. Nduwimana received an Honoris Causa Ph.D. Diploma in Leadership and Management from London Graduate School and Commonwealth University in 2019.

== Career ==
Nduwimana first major political appointment was his appointment as Minister of Home Affairs. He later became the second vice-president of the Burundian Parliament. While in this position in the parliament, he was nominated for the election of Ombudsman of the Republic of Burundi along with seven others. Nduwimana won the election to the office of ombudsman conducted in the Burundian parliament with 106 votes to replace Muhamed Rukara. Following his election as Ombudsman, he resigned from his seat in the parliament as required by the Burundian electoral code.
