= 1991 Burundian Charter of National Unity referendum =

- 9 February 1991

Results
Choice	Votes	%
Yes	1,876,958	89.77%
No	213,817	10.23%
Valid votes	2,090,775	99.38%
Invalid or blank votes	13,143	0.62%
Total votes	2,103,918	100.00%
Registered voters/turnout	2,186,591	96.22%

A referendum on the Charter of National Unity was held in Burundi on 9 February 1991. The charter would abolish ethnic discrimination and give a mandate for the government to write a new constitution. It was approved by 89.77% of voters with a 96% turnout. Following the Charter's approval, work began on the drafting of a new constitution which was approved in a referendum held on 9 March 1992. It was promulgated on 13 March 1992.

== Results ==
Choice	Votes	%
For	1,876,958	89.77
Against	213,817	10.23
Invalid/blank votes	13,163	–
Total	2,103,938	100
Registered voters/turnout	2,186,591	96.22
Source: African Elections Database
