= Commune of Bukinanyana =

Coordinates: 2°50′54″S 29°23′04″E

- Commune
- Interactive map of Commune of Bukinanyana
- Country: Burundi
- Province: Cibitoke Province
- Administrative center: Bukinanyana
- Time zone: UTC+2 (Central Africa Time)

The commune of Bukinanyana is a commune of Cibitoke Province in north-western Burundi. The capital lies at Bukinanyana.
