= Movement for the Rehabilitation of Citizens – Rurenzangemero =

Political party in Burundi

The Movement for the Rehabilitation of Citizens–Rurenzangemero (French: Mouvement pour la Réhabilitation du Citoyen–Rurenzangemero, MRC–Rurenzangemero) is a political party in Burundi. It is currently led by Epitace Banyaganakandi.

== History ==
The party was established in 2002, drawing most of its support from the ethnic Tutsi minority. It received 2% of the vote in the 2005 parliamentary elections, winning two seats. It subsequently joined the government, taking the Social Security and Public Service ministerial portfolios.

The party boycotted the 2010 parliamentary elections but participated in the 2015 Burundian parliamentary election.
