= Free Socialist Party of Burundi =

The Free Socialist Party of Burundi (French: Parti socialiste libre du Burundi, abbreviated Parsocilibre) was a political party in Burundi. Parsocilibre was founded in March 1961. It was led by Michel Buyoya (former president of UPROHUTU) and Pascal Baranyikwa. The party supported constitutional monarchy. It had its office in Kayanza.
