= Front for Democracy in Burundi–Nyakuri =

Political party in Burundi

The Front for Democracy in Burundi–Nyakuri (French: Front pour la Démocratie au Burundi–Nyakuri, FRODEBU-Nyakuri), also known as Sahwanya Frodebu Iragi rya Ndadaye, is a political party in Burundi.

== History ==
The party was established in June 2008 as a breakaway from the Front for Democracy in Burundi (FRODEBU) by Jean Minani and eleven other party members. Supportive of the governing CNDD–FDD, it took the name "Nyakuri", meaning "genuine".

Although the 2010 parliamentary elections were boycotted by the opposition, FRODEBU-Nyakuri contested the elections, winning five of the 106 seats in the National Assembly.
