= Zedi Feruzi =

- Died: 23 May 2015; Ngagara district, Bujumbura, Burundi
- Cause of death: Assassination
- Education: University of Burundi
- Occupation: Politician
- Political party: Union for Peace and Development (UPD-Zigamibanga)

Zedi Feruzi (died 23 May 2015) was a Burundian politician from the minor Union for Peace and Development (UPD-Zigamibanga) party. His assassination during the political unrest of 2015, allegedly by supporters of the incumbent government of Pierre Nkurunziza, led to an increased polarisation between government and its political opponents.

== Biography ==
A member of Burundi's small Muslim community, Feruzi studied at the University of Burundi. He taught History for several years at a Catholic secondary school in Bujumbura before entering the Burundian government in 2006 to work in the Ministry of Justice. His brother served as governor of Muyinga Province. Feruzi subsequently took the leadership of the Union for Peace and Development (UPD-Zigamibanga), a small party supported predominantly by Muslims, in opposition to President Pierre Nkurunziza. In 2011, after the National Assembly of Burundi approved changed to laws governing political parties Feruzi withdrew the UPD-Zigamibanga from the ADC–Ikibiri. He was subsequently suspended by the executive committee of his own party. Feruzi was a vocal critic of Nkurunziza's ambition to stand for a third presidential term which sparked a political crisis after it was announced in April 2015.

On 23 May 2015, Feruzi was shot dead, together with his bodyguard, in a drive-by shooting in the Ngagara district of Bujumbura as he was returning home. He was buried in a Muslim cemetery in Bujumbura. Several thousand people attended his funeral. The murder was condemned by Ban Ki-moon, United Nations Secretary-General, and the United Nations Security Council. After his death other opposition politicians and activists went into hiding. They suspended talks with the Burundian government to protest the killing of Feruzi.
