= People's Reconciliation Party =

Political party in Burundi

The People's Reconciliation Party (French: Parti de la Réconciliation des Personnes, PRP) is a minor political party in Burundi.

== History ==
The party was established in September 1991 and registered on 30 June 1992. It nominated Pierre-Claver Sendegeya as its candidate for the 1993 presidential elections. Sendegeya finished third with 1.5% of the vote.

Led by Jean Bosco Yamuremye, it received 1.4% of the vote in the 1993 parliamentary elections, failing to win a seat.

In 1994 its leader Mathias Hitimana was arrested as the government considered the party to have extremist leanings. The arrest led to riots that affected Bujumbura for three days. In March 1995 the PRP was given a ministerial post, but the party pulled out of the government in December, and Hitimana was arrested again in January 1996.

The party was given a ministerial post in the transitional government in November 2001, but left the government again in July 2002, before returning in 2003. In 2006 party president Déo Niyonzima was arrested for alleged involvement in a coup plot, but was acquitted in January 2007.

== Ideology ==
The party supports the restoration of the monarchy.
