= Union for Peace and Democracy =

Political party in Burundi

Union for Peace and Democracy–Zigamibanga Union pour la paix et la démocratie–Zigamibanga
- Leader: Unknown
- General Secretary: Marina Barampama
- Historical leaders: Mohamed Feruzi; Zedi Feruzi
- Founder: Hussein Radjabu
- Founded: August 2002
- Split from: National Council for the Defense of Democracy – Forces for the Defense of Democracy
- Colors: Red, Green, Yellow

Party flag

The Union for Peace and Democracy–Zigamibanga (French: Union pour la paix et la démocratie–Zigamibanga, UPD or UPD–Zigamibanga), sometimes known as the Union for Peace and Development–Zigamibanga (Union pour la paix et le développement–Zigamibanga), is a small political party in Burundi which was founded in 2002 but which only became active after 2007. The UPD is one of the parties in opposition to the ruling National Council for the Defense of Democracy – Forces for the Defense of Democracy (CNDD–FDD) party. It is seen as the party of Burundi's small Muslim community.

== History ==
The UPD was registered on 12 September 2002 . It was originally created as a front organisation in case the CNDD–FDD, which had been formed as a rebel armed group during the Burundian Civil War, was refused official recognition as a political party. When the CNDD–FDD did receive recognition in 2005, the UPD became inactive. It did not stand candidates in the legislative elections of 2005.

Despite playing an important role in the rise of Pierre Nkurunziza to the Presidency, Radjabu was expelled from the CNDD–FDD in 2007 and imprisoned for plotting to overthrow the government. Radjabu re-activated the UPD, installing his cousin Mohamed Feruzi as party leader. Radjabu continued to run the party from prison however. The UPD became popular within Burundi's small Muslim community from which the Radjabu family originates.

During the political unrest in Burundi in 2015, the UPD's incumbent leader, Zedi Feruzi, was assassinated in Bujumbura. His killing on 23 May 2015, during protests against the Nkurunziza regime, caused a deepening of the confrontation as the opposition suspended its participation in talks with the government. The UPD was originally part of the alliance of opposition parties known as CNARES but left in 2016.

The UPD stood in the elections for the National Assembly in May 2020 but gained just 0.05% of the vote and won no seats.
