= Rally for the People of Burundi =

Political party in Burundi

The Rally for the People of Burundi (French: Rassemblement du peuple Burundais) is a political party in Burundi. It was headed by Ernest Kabushemeye, until his assassination in 1995, since when Balthazar Bigirimana has been party leader.

== History ==
The RPB was registered on 12 August 1992. It supported victorious candidate Melchior Ndadaye of the Front for Democracy in Burundi in the 1993 presidential elections. In the 1993 parliamentary elections it received 1.7% of the vote, failing to win a seat.
