= Party for a Non-Violent Society =

Political party in Burundi

The Party for a Non-Violent Society (SONOVI) is a small progressive political party in Burundi.
