= People's Party (Burundi) =

The People's Party (French: Parti Populaire, PP) was a small political party in Burundi led by Shadracik Niyonkuru.

== History ==
The party was registered on 30 June 1992, and supported winning candidate Melchior Ndadaye of the Front for Democracy in Burundi in the 1993 presidential elections. In the parliamentary elections later in the year the PP received 1.2% of the vote, failing to win a seat. However, it was given a ministerial post in governments formed in 1995, 2001 and 2003.
