= Party for the Promotion of the Toiling Masses – Abanyamwete =

Political party in Burundi

The Party for the Promotion of the Toiling Masses-Abanyamwete (PML-Abanyamwete) is a small political party in Burundi.
