= 2010 Burundian presidential election =

- 28 June 2010
- Registered: 3,553,372
- Turnout: 76.99%
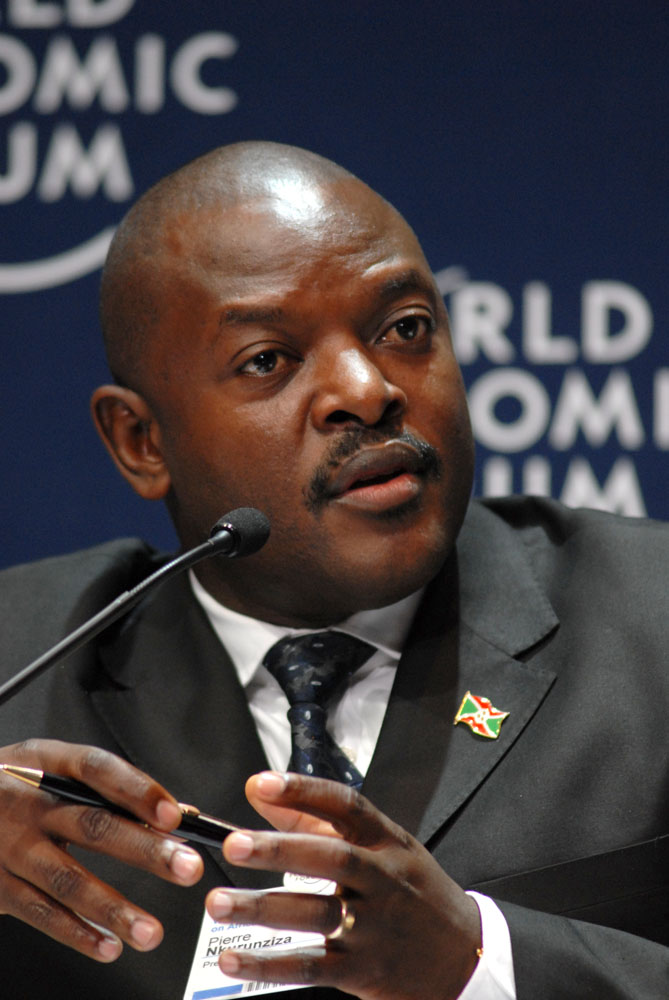
Nominee	Pierre Nkurunziza
Party	CNDD–FDD
Popular vote	2,479,483
Percentage	91.62%
President before election
Pierre Nkurunziza
CNDD–FDD
Elected President
Pierre Nkurunziza
CNDD–FDD

Presidential elections were held in Burundi on 28 June 2010. As a result of withdrawals and alleged fraud and intimidation, incumbent President Pierre Nkurunziza was the only candidate.

== Background ==
Although the previous presidential election in 2005 had been carried out by the Parliament, the 2010 elections were direct. In early March 2010, the run-up to the election was described as "explosive" due to a combination of demobilized former combatants and violence between youth activists in the ruling CNDD-FDD and opposition FRODEBU.

Following the Burundi Civil War, between the Tutsi and Hutu (similar to Rwanda), the National Liberation Forces (FNL) were brought into the legal political sphere and were said to be the incumbent Pierre Nkurunziza's most viable opposition. However, as a result of a campaign of intimidation in the run up to the vote, as well as alleging fraud in earlier local elections, all the other candidates withdrew from the ballot leaving only Nkurunziza. On 1 June 2010, five opposition candidates, including Agathon Rwasa, who was considered the strongest contender, withdrew from the elections, alleging that the government intended to rig it.

Following further similarities with Rwanda, ethnic tensions between Tutsi and Hutu were seen in the lead up to the Rwandan presidential election in the same year. Bombings there were blamed on the Interhamwe.

== Conduct ==
The day before the election three grenade attacks were reported in the early hours of the morning. Two attacks in the Buyenzi and Kamesa districts of Bujumbura caused no injuries, but an explosion in the western town of Kanyosha killed one person and wounded two. The person killed was reportedly an FNL official. Another man was shot dead in Bujumbaura's Musanga neighbourhood in a suspected politically motivated attack. On election day, three more grenade attacks occurred in Bujumbura, while two more exploded in the north of the country. In all, at least eight people were killed and more than 60 wounded after the opposition candidates pulled out of the elections.

The FNL were suspected of being behind the grenade attacks, with local police searching the home of party leader Agathon Rwasa. However, the FNL denied involvement in the attacks and claimed Rwasa was being targeted for political reasons. According to Alexis Sinduhije, chairman of the Movement for Solidarity and Development, police also arrested six members of his party.

The East African Community – comprising Burundi, Rwanda, Kenya, Uganda and Tanzania – urged all parties to ensure a smooth and democratic election.

== Results ==
In the FNL bastion of Kanyosha, only a handful of voters turned out to vote, compared to hundreds who voted in the local council elections a month before. The chair of an international observation mission, Lydie Nzengou, affirmed during the day that the turnout was much lower.

Candidate	Party	Votes	%
Pierre Nkurunziza	CNDD–FDD	2,479,483	91.62
Against		226,919	8.38
Total		2,706,402	100.00
Valid votes		2,706,402	98.93
Invalid/blank votes		29,356	1.07
Total votes		2,735,758	100.00
Registered voters/turnout		3,553,372	76.99
Source: AFP, People's Daily Online

== Aftermath ==
Following the elections, Rwasa went into hiding due to speculation that the government wanted to arrest him on charges of planning a new insurgency. He was quoted as saying that "They're [the government] looking for me because I told the truth, because I said publicly that I don't accept the results of the local elections. [Last] Wednesday they wanted to arrest me again. I got wind of it and I disappeared from circulation." It was presumed that he was in the Democratic Republic of Congo.

In late September 2010, 14 bodies were founded gagged and bound. Authorities blamed "unidentified armed bandits," but also said "Twenty-two criminals were arrested and are detained in Mpimba prison [in Bujumbura] while 20 others were arrested in the Democratic Republic of Congo and are being interrogated." Police sources added that most of those arrested belonged to the opposition Movement for Solidarity and Democracy and the National Liberation Forces.
