= Parliamentary Monarchist Party =

Political party in Burundi

Parliamentary Monarchist Party Parti monarchiste parlementaire
- Founder: Guillaume Ruzoviyo
- Founded: August 2001
- Ideology: Monarchism; Parliamentarism
- International affiliation: International Monarchist Conference

The Parliamentary Monarchist Party (PMP) (French: Parti monarchiste parlementaire) is a small royalist party in Burundi which seeks the restoration of the monarchy, deposed in a coup in 1966. It was founded by Guillaume Ruzoviyo in August 2001. The party has no elected representatives in parliament and Guillaume Ruzoviyo has not held a government post since the end of 2005, but the PMP rallied in a coalition of 10 parties at the 2010 general elections, and obtained the management of the Burundi Embassy in Russia. PMP is member of International Monarchist Conference.

== Background ==
The return to multipartism in 1991 in Burundi allowed the Burundian monarchist movement to reappear on the national scene. Forbidden by the Constitution since the 1970s, the very fact of claiming to be a royalist was punishable by imprisonment. First known as the Parliamentary Royalist Party, in 1992 it became the People's Reconciliation Party (PRP) in order to register as an opposition party and run for the first multiparty elections in June 1993. Pierre-Claver Sendegeya received 1.44% of the vote in these elections.

In 2001 the Parliamentary Monarchist Party was founded by Léopold Biha, André Muhirwa, Charles Mbanzamihigo, Henry Kana, Godefroy Kamatari, Ildephonse Rwigemere Mboneko and Guillaume Ruzoviyo. President Pierre Buyoya (1987-1993 and 1996-2003) awarded Mathias Hitimana the post of Minister of Mines in order to control the monarchist movement, but he lost his post in July 2002 following the armed rebellion of the National Council for the Defense of Democracy.
