= Hussein Radjabu =

Burundian politician

Personal details
- Party: National Council for the Defense of Democracy – Forces for the Defense of Democracy

El-Hajji Hussein Radjabu is a Burundian politician. He was the party chairman of the ruling National Council for the Defense of Democracy – Forces for the Defense of Democracy until February 2007, when he was deposed at a party congress. In April 2007, he was arrested on charges of "plotting an armed rebellion and insulting the president by referring to him as an "empty bottle". In April 2008, Radjabu Hussein was convicted of those charges, leading to a 13-year prison sentence. He is a Muslim of Hutu ethnicity and is from Muyinga in the northern part of the country. He is devoted to his religion and has gone on Hajj to Mecca.
