= 2010 Burundian parliamentary election =

- 23 July 2010
- National Assembly
Party	Leader	Vote %	Seats	+/–
CNDD–FDD	Pierre Nkurunziza	81.19	81	+17
UPRONA	Bonaventure Niyoyankana	11.06	17	+2
FRODEBU–Nyakuri	Jean Minani	5.88	5	New
This lists parties that won seats. See the complete results below.
- Senate
Party	Leader	Seats	+/–
CNDD–FDD	Pierre Nkurunziza	32	0
UPRONA	Bonaventure Niyoyankana	2	0
This lists parties that won seats. See the complete results below.

Parliamentary elections were held in Burundi on 23 July 2010. The opposition parties boycotted the election after also boycotting the presidential election.

The ruling National Council for the Defense of Democracy – Forces for the Defense of Democracy won 81 of the 106 seats, while the Union for National Progress gained 17 seats. Another smaller party won five seats, while the remaining three seats are reserved for the Twa minority. Pie Ntavyohanyuma was re-elected as Speaker. Mo-Mamo Karerwa was elected as first deputy Speaker and Francois Kabura as second deputy Speaker.

== Results ==
=== National Assembly ===
Party	Votes	%	Seats			
Party	Votes	%	Elected	Co-opted	Total	+/–
CNDD–FDD	1,848,023	81.19	80	1	81	+17
Union for National Progress	251,759	11.06	16	1	17	+2
Front for Democracy in Burundi–Nyakuri	133,904	5.88	4	1	5	New
Other parties and independents (Note: Includes the Coalition for Free and Transparent Elections, the Independent Labor Party, Kaze – Forces for the Defense of Democracy and the National Liberation Front)	42,615	1.87	0	0	0	–
Co-opted Twa members			–	3	3	0
Total	2,276,301	100.00	100	6	106	–12
Valid votes	2,276,301	96.13				
Invalid/blank votes	91,625	3.87				
Total votes	2,367,926	100.00				
Registered voters/turnout	3,551,125	66.68				
Source: African Elections Database, IPU, CENI

=== Senate ===
The Senate was elected on 28 July by electoral colleges composed of local councillors.

Party	Votes	%	Seats			
Party	Votes	%	Elected	Co-opted	Total	+/–
CNDD–FDD			32	0	32	0
Union for National Progress			2	0	2	0
Co-opted Twa members			–	3	3	0
Former presidents			–	4	4	0
Total			34	7	41	–7
Total votes	1,500	–				
Registered voters/turnout	1,935	77.52				
Source: African Elections Database
