= National Congress for Liberty =

Political party in Burundi

National Congress for Liberty Congrès national pour la liberté
- Leader: Agathon Rwasa
- Founder: Agathon Rwasa
- Founded: 12 September 2018
- Registered: 14 February 2019
- Split from: National Forces of Liberation
- Ideology: Hutu interests
- Senate: 0 / 13
- National Assembly: 0 / 111

The National Congress for Liberty (French: Congrès national pour la liberté, CNL), sometimes translated as the National Congress for Freedom is a political party in Burundi. It was founded by Agathon Rwasa on 12 September 2018 and is now the main opposition to the CNDD-FDD. After the dissolution of the National Liberation Forces, Rwasa founded the CNL.

== History ==
The National Forces of Liberation were a political party and former rebel group in Burundi. They fought in the Burundian Civil War and were the last rebel group to sign an agreement with the Burundian government which they did on September 7, 2006. Throughout the war they were known as Palipehutu-FNL (Party for the Liberation of the Hutu People), but after the war they registered as the FNL (National Forces of Liberation), as ethnic group names are not allowed in Burundian political party names. In their first election of 2010, they withdrew their candidate Agathon Rwasa due to allegations that the CNDD-FDD. would rig it. By 2015, they had ousted Rwasa and were allies of the CNDD-FDD. That year they won 1.08 percent of the vote after nominating Jacques Bigirimana. Rwasa ran as part of the alliance Independents of Hope which he formed with Charles Nditije. Rwasa received 19 percent of the vote. In 2018, Rwasa founded the National Congress for Liberty and it was registered on 14 February 2019. That year, Rwasa received 25% of the vote in an election but claimed the results were incorrect. That year, they won one seat in the Senate and 32 in the National Assembly.
