= 1993 Burundian parliamentary election =

- 29 June 1993
- All 81 seats in the National Assembly; 41 seats needed for a majority
Party	Leader	Vote %	Seats	+/–
FRODEBU	Melchior Ndadaye	72.58	65	New
UPRONA	Pierre Buyoya	21.87	16	−36
This lists parties that won seats. See the complete results below.
Results by constituency
Speaker after
Pontien Karibwami; FRODEBU

Parliamentary elections were held in Burundi on 29 June 1993. They were the first multi-party parliamentary elections since 1965, and followed the approval of a new constitution in a referendum in 1992. The result was a victory for the Front for Democracy in Burundi, which won 65 of the 81 seats.

== Campaign ==
Six political parties and eight independents took part in the election

- Front for Democracy in Burundi (FRODEBU) - a predominantly Hutu party founded by Melchior Ndadaye in 1986. It was officially registered as a political party in 1992.
- People's Party (PP) - a predominantly Hutu party.
- People's Reconciliation Party (PRP) - a monarchist party led by Pierre-Claver Sendegeya.
- Rally for Democracy and Economic and Social Development (RADDES) - a predominantly Tutsi party who supported Pierre Buyoya in the presidential election.
- Rally for the People of Burundi (RPB) - a predominantly Hutu party that supported Melchior Ndadaye in the presidential election.
- Union for National Progress (UPRONA) - predominantly Tutsi and former sole legal party led by Pierre Buyoya.

== Results ==
Party	Votes	%	Seats
Front for Democracy in Burundi	1,532,106	72.58	65
Union for National Progress	461,691	21.87	16
Rally for the People of Burundi	35,932	1.70	0
People's Reconciliation Party	30,251	1.43	0
Rally for Democracy and Economic and Social Development	26,519	1.26	0
People's Party	24,372	1.15	0
Total	2,110,871	100.00	81
Valid votes	2,110,871	97.88	
Invalid/blank votes	45,788	2.12	
Total votes	2,156,659	100.00	
Registered voters/turnout	2,360,090	91.38	
Source: EISA
