= Parliament of Burundi =

Burundian legislature

Type
- Type: Bicameralism
- Houses: Senate; National Assembly

History
- Founded: 1962

Structure
- Seats: 124 members (111 and 13)
- Senate political groups: CNDD–FDD: 10 seats Twa: 3 seats
- National Assembly political groups: CNDD–FDD: 108 seats Twa: 3 seats

Elections
- Senate voting system: Electoral college
- National Assembly voting system: Closed list proportional representation with 2% electoral threshold
- First Senate election: 1 April 1965
- First National Assembly election: 10 May 1965
- Last Senate election: 23 July 2025
- Last National Assembly election: 5 June 2025
- Next Senate election: 23 July 2030
- Next National Assembly election: 5 June 2030

Meeting place
- Bujumbura

Website
- www.assemblee.bi www.senat.bi

The Parliament of Burundi (Kirundi: Abashingamateka) consists of two chambers:

- The Senate, called Inama nkenguzamateka in Kirundi, is made up of 13 members
- The National Assembly, called Inama nshingamateka in Kirundi, is made up of 111 members

== See also ==
- Politics of Burundi
- List of legislatures by country
