= Rally for Democracy and Economic and Social Development =

Political party in Burundi

The Rally for Democracy and Economic and Social Development (French: Ralliement pour la Démocratie et le Développement Économique et Social, RADDES) is a small, predominantly ethnic Tutsi political party in Burundi.

== History ==
The party supported losing candidate Pierre Buyoya of the Union for National Progress in the 1993 presidential elections. In the parliamentary elections later in the year, RADDES received 1.3% of the vote, failing to win a seat.
