= Kaze–Forces for the Defense of Democracy =

Political party in Burundi

Kaze-Forces for the Defense of Democracy, also known by its abbreviated form KAZE-FDD, is a small, predominantly ethnic Hutu political party in Burundi. It is led by Jean-Bosco Ndayikengurukiye. The Kaze-FDD used to be a faction of the CNDD-FDD.
