= Liberal Party (Burundi) =

Political party in Burundi

- Chairperson: Rukohoza Margueritte
- Founder: Gaëtan Nikobamye
- Founded: 1992

The Liberal Party (French: Parti Liberal, PL) is a small centrist, predominantly ethnic Hutu political party in Burundi.

The party was among the parties that signed the Declaration by the Participants to the Peace Negotiations in Burundi in 1998 in Arusha, Tanzania. The agreement demonstrates and provides for the following dimensions:

1. The universal commitment to resolve the Burundi conflict by peaceful means and end all forms of violence.
2. The commitment to resume talks in one month’s time.
3. The setting of the agenda for the comprehensive negotiations.
4. The appointment of the committees which are to assume responsibility for the various agenda items.

== Formation ==
Parti Liberal was founded in 1992 by Gaëtan Nikobamye and supported President Melchior Ndadaye in the Burundi 1993 elections.
