= Senate (Burundi) =

Upper house of the Burundian legislature

Senate of Burundi Inama nkenguzamateka (Kirundi) Sénat du Burundi (French)

Type
- Type: Upper house of the Parliament of Burundi

History
- Founded: 1 April 1965; 61 years ago
- New session started: 23 July 2025; 15 months ago

Leadership
- President: Gervais Ndirakobuca, CNDD-FDD since 5 August 2025
- 1st Vice President: Générose Ngendanganya, CNDD-FDD since 5 August 2025
- 2nd Vice President: Clotilde Kampimbare, CNDD-FDD since 5 August 2025

Structure
- Seats: 13 senators
- Political groups: CNDD–FDD: 10 seats Twa: 3 seats
- Length of term: 5 years

Elections
- Voting system: Electoral college
- First election: 1 April 1965
- Last election: 23 July 2025
- Next election: July 2030

Meeting place
- Gitega

Website
- www.senat.bi

The Senate (Kirundi: Inama nkenguzamateka) is the upper chamber of Parliament in Burundi. It consists of between 13 members who serve 5-year terms. The current Senate was elected on 23 July 2025 and consists of 13 members.

Under the newly promulgated 2018 constitution and following the new administrative division, the senate similarly to the national assembly saw its number of seats reduced. The senate goes from 39 seats to 13 seats starting from the 2025 legislative elections.

This change was first enacted with the recent election that was held on 23 July 2025.

== Election process ==
In each of the country's 5 provinces, two Senators (one Hutu and one Tutsi) are chosen by electoral colleges of communal councilors. Voting takes place using a three round system. In the first two rounds, a candidate must receive a supermajority of two-thirds of the vote to be elected. If no candidate is elected in these rounds, a third round is organized for the two leading candidates, of which the candidate receiving the majority of votes is elected. Three Senators represent the Twa ethnic group and additional members may be co-opted to meet the 30% gender representation quota for women. Former heads of state were Senators by right under the previous constitution. Under the newly promulgated 2018 constitutions, this clause was removed.

== History ==
The 1962 constitution of the Kingdom of Burundi provided for the creation of the Senate at the discretion of the Mwami and the National Assembly. A royal decree formally establishing the body was issued on 1 April 1965. Following the 1965 National Assembly elections, the 16-member Senate was constituted. Eight members of the Senate were elected by the members of the National Assembly—each representing one of the county's provinces, all of which were UPRONA members. The eight Senate members elected a further four members, with a further four appointed by the King. It was empowered to review legislation but not propose bills on its own accord. Parliament ceased to exist after a failed coup attempt in 1965 and the country's system of government was completely altered following Michel Micombero's successful coup in 1966.

The Senate was re-established following Arusha Accords. The transitional constitution was adopted on 18 October 2001. The transitional senate was designated by the President and Vice-President of Burundi, and by the Office of the National Assembly, and was designed to balance political, ethic and regional representation. It was chaired by Libère Bararunyeretse and included the three former heads of state, three Twa people and at least two people with different ethnicity from each province. It had 57 members.

In a popular referendum on 28 February 2005 the people of Burundi overwhelmingly approved a post-transitional constitution. Senate members were indirectly elected on 29 July 2005 by an electoral college of commune and provincial councils. The National Council for the Defense of Democracy-Forces for the Defense of Democracy (CNDD-FDD), which obtained the majority of seats in communal elections held in June, won an overwhelming majority (30) of the seats. The Front for Democracy in Burundi (FRODEBU) won 3 seats, while the remaining seat went the National Council for the Defense of Democracy (CNDD), a breakaway faction of the CNDD-FDD.

Four former heads of state - Jean-Baptiste Bagaza (PARENA), Pierre Buyoya (UPRONA), Sylvestre Ntibantunganya (FRODEBU), and the current transitional president Domitien Ndayizeye (FRODEBU) will occupy seats in the Senate along with three Twa members. In order to meet the 30% quota for women, eight seats were co-opted giving the chamber of total of 49 seats.

On 19 August 2005, the Senate and National Assembly (acting as an Electoral College) elected Pierre Nkurunziza president of the republic. He took office on 26 August 2005.

Gervais Rufyikiri, a member of the CNDD-FDD, was elected president of the Senate on 17 August 2005. On 25 June 2015, he fled the country saying he felt threatened after opposing President Nkurunziza's bid for a third term. His replacement, Révérien Ndikuriyo, had made remarks comparing political opponents to cockroaches, similar to what politicians did during the Rwandan genocide, raising fears of another genocide.

== See also ==
- List of legislatures by country
- List of presidents of the Senate of Burundi
- Legislative branch
- National Assembly (Burundi), the other branch of Burundi's Parliament

== Sources ==
- Burundi (06/09), U.S. State Department
- Senators list (in French), Senate of Burundi
- Transitional Senate (in French), Senate of the Republic of Burundi
- Weinstein, Warren (1976). Historical Dictionary of Burundi. Metuchen: Scarecrow Press. ISBN 978-0-8108-0962-8.
