= Agathon Rwasa =

Burundian politician

Agathon Rwasa MP
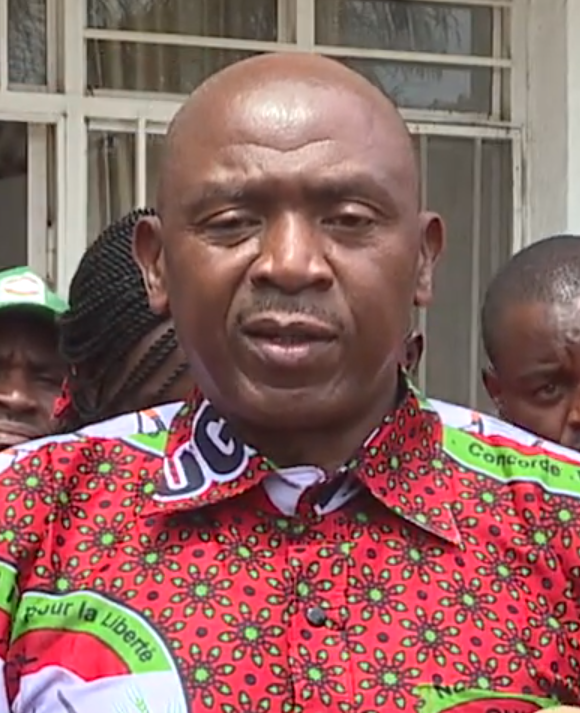

Personal details
- Born: 10 January 1964 (age 62) Ngozi Province, Burundi
- Party: National Congress for Liberty (2018–present)
- Other political affiliations: National Liberation Forces (1988–2018)

Agathon Rwasa (born 10 January 1964) is a Burundian politician and the former leader of the National Liberation Forces (Forces pour la Libération Nationale, FNL). He was a Hutu militia leader during the Burundi Civil War.

Rwasa was reported to be a born-again Christian.

== Early life and education ==
Born to Hutu parents in 1964 in Ngozi (North), Rwasa is the seventh child in the family of 14 children. He attended primary and secondary education in his native province. At the age of 20, he was appointed head of the association of young intellectuals. After graduating from the University of Burundi, he was wanted by the government like most other Hutu intellectuals in the region. He was responsible for the Gatumba massacre that resulted in the killing of 166 members of the Tutsi minority.

== Political career ==
From a member of the political bureau, he quickly rose to become the leader of the National Liberation Forces (FNL). After 20 years in the bush, he returned home in 2008.

The FNL has also been accused of using hundreds of child soldiers, and for killing and maiming women, children and babies.

In September 2006 the FNL signed a peace deal with the government.

In June 2010, Rwasa went into hiding, claiming he was facing arrest for allegedly destabilising the country following district elections. However, Burundi's attorney general stated that there is no warrant out for Rwasa.

In July 2015, he was elected as the deputy speaker of the Parliament of Burundi.

On March 18, 2024, the Burundian government took note of the decisions of the extraordinary congress organized by the National Congress for Freedom, no longer recognizing Agathon Rwasa as the main leader of the party.

== See also ==
- Cases before the International Criminal Court#Burundi
