= National Assembly (Burundi) =

Lower chamber of parliament in Burundi

Coordinates: 3.3598°S 29.3730°E

National Assembly Inama nshingamateka (Kirundi) Assemblée Nationale du Burundi (French)

Type
- Type: Lower house of the Parliament of Burundi

History
- Founded: 1962; 64 years ago

Leadership
- President: Gelase Ndabirabe, CNDD-FDD since 31 July 2025
- 1st Vice President: Fabrice Nkurunziza, CNDD-FDD since 31 July 2025
- 2nd Vice President: Boussessia Nkezimana, CNDD-FDD since 31 July 2025

Structure
- Seats: 100 directly elected, additional members co-opted to meet constitutional requirements
- Political groups: CNDD–FDD: 108 seats Twa: 3 seats
- Length of term: 5 years

Elections
- Voting system: Closed list proportional representation with 2% electoral threshold
- First election: 10 May 1965
- Last election: 5 June 2025
- Next election: July 2030

Meeting place
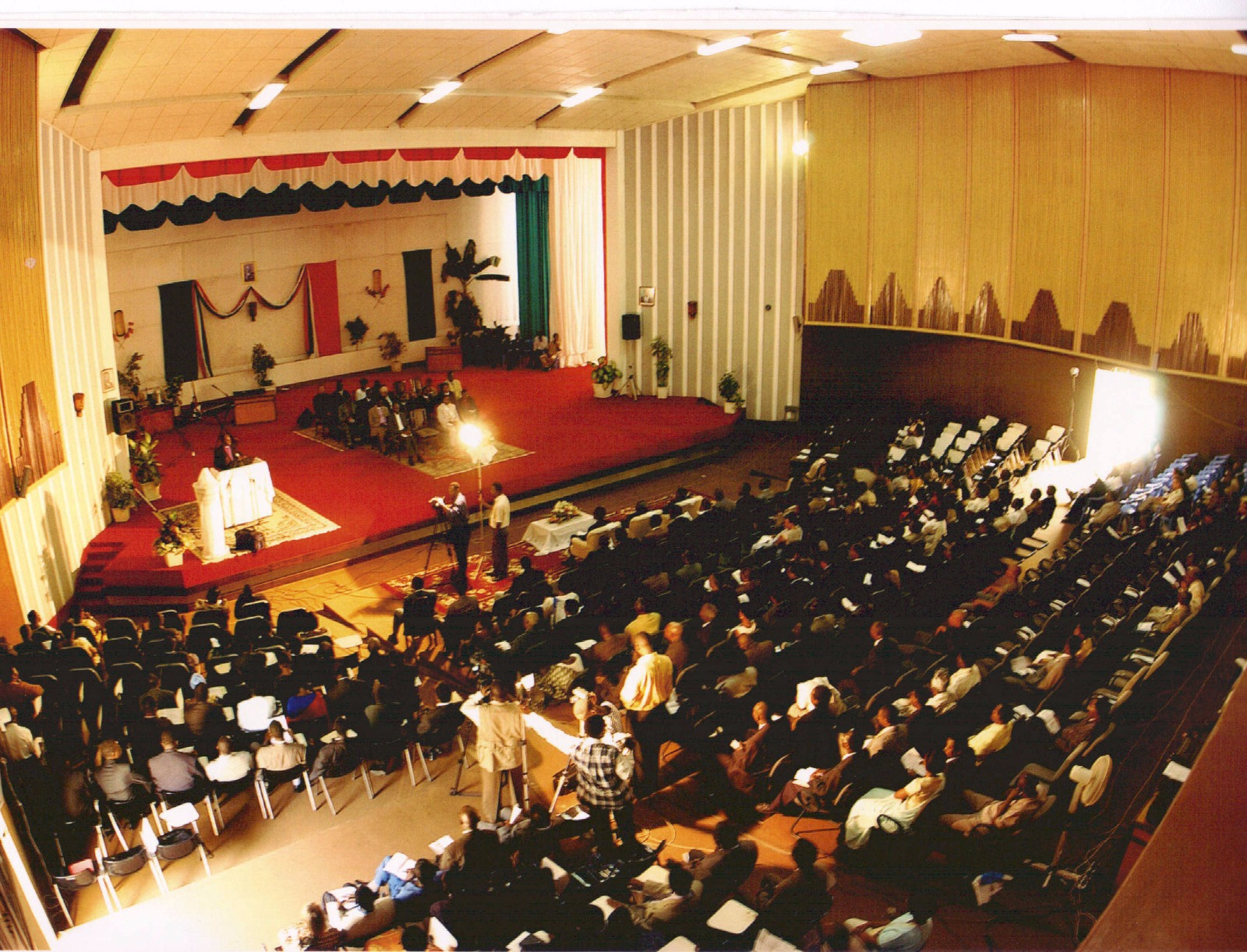
- Kigobe Congress Center, Bujumbura

Website
- www.assemblee.bi

The National Assembly (Kirundi: Inama nshingamateka) is the lower chamber of Parliament in Burundi. It consists of 100 directly elected members (or deputies) and between 18 and 23 co-opted members who serve five-year terms.

Deputies are elected in 5 multi-member constituencies using a party-list proportional representation system in accordance with the D'Hondt method. Political parties and lists of independent candidates must receive over 2% of the vote nationally to gain representation in the National Assembly.

== History ==
As a country that has been devastated by civil war and persistent ethnic violence since its independence in 1962, Burundi's new constitution (approved in a February 2005 referendum) requires that 60% of the deputies be from the Hutu ethnic group, while the remaining 40% come from the Tutsi ethnic group. In addition, three co-opted members represent the Twa ethnic group. Women must occupy at least 30% of the seats in the National Assembly.

Elections to the National Assembly took place on 4 July 2005. The National Council for the Defense of Democracy-Forces for the Defense of Democracy (CNDD-FDD) won 59 of the 100 seats filled through direct election. The Front for Democracy in Burundi (FRODEBU), who won a majority of seats in the previous election held in 1993, won 25 seats. The Union for National Progress (UPRONA) won 10, while the National Council for the Defense of Democracy (CNDD), a breakaway faction of the CNDD-FDD, won 4. The small, predominantly Tutsi Movement for the Rehabilitation of Citizens-Rurenzangemero (MRC-Rurenzangemero), won the remaining 2 seats. An additional 18 members were co-opted to meet the required ethnic and gender quotas.

Immaculée Nahayo, an ethnic Hutu member of the CNDD-FDD, was elected president of the National Assembly on 16 August 2005.

On 19 August 2005, the National Assembly and Senate Assembly (acting as an Electoral College) elected Pierre Nkurunziza president of the republic. He took office on 26 August 2005.

== See also ==
- List of legislatures by country
- List of presidents of the National Assembly of Burundi
- Legislative branch
- Senate (Burundi), the other branch of Burundi's Parliament
