= National Council for the Defense of Democracy – Forces for the Defense of Democracy =

Political party in Burundi

National Council for the Defense of Democracy–Forces for the Defense of Democracy Conseil National Pour la Défense de la Démocratie–Forces Pour la Défense de la Démocratie
- Abbreviation: CNDD–FDD
- President: General Évariste Ndayishimiye
- Spokesperson: Doriane Munezero
- Secretary-General: Révérien Ndikuriyo
- Vice Secretary-General: Cyriaque Nshimirimana
- Permanent Visionary: Pierre Nkurunziza
- Founded: May 1998; 28 years ago
- Registered: January 2005; 21 years ago
- Split from: National Council for the Defense of Democracy
- Headquarters: Bujumbura
- Youth wing: Imbonerakure
- Women's wing: Abakenyerarugamba
- Ideology: Hutu nationalism Social conservatism Militarism; Anti-West
- Political position: Far-right
- Colors: Red; Green; White
- Senate: 10 / 13
- National Assembly: 108 / 111

Election symbol
- An eagle holding a machete and a cassava leaf

Party flag

Website
- https://cndd-fdd.org/

The National Council for the Defense of Democracy–Forces for the Defense of Democracy (French: Conseil National Pour la Défense de la Démocratie–Forces Pour la Défense de la Démocratie, CNDD–FDD) is the ruling political party in Burundi. It emerged as the most significant rebel group during the Burundian Civil War and transformed into a political party after the conflict. The party's rule has been described as authoritarian.

== History ==
During the civil war, the CNDD was the political wing of the organization, while the FDD was the military wing. The original CNDD was founded in 1994, a year after the first democratically elected President Melchior Ndadaye was killed by elements of Burundi's Tutsi-dominated army in a failed coup d'état. The political wing was dominated by Hutu intellectuals from the southern region of Bururi led by Léonard Nyangoma, while the armed wing was made up of troops drawn from across the country. During the war, the group was often referred to simply by the name of the armed wing (FDD).

In May 1998, Jean-Bosco Ndayikengurukiye, Nyangoma's chief of staff, caused a schism by ousting the latter over leadership issues and losses suffered by the group during the First Congo War, the Nyangoma-led faction later taking a seat at the Arusha negotiations, while Ndayikengurukiye's faction carried out its fight. In 2001, the CNDD– FDD consisted of about 25,000 rebels, but in September of that year Ndayikengurukiye was ousted by a faction led by Pierre Nkurunziza over the former's handling of negotiations with the government to join the transitional administration set up by in Arusha Accords. The Nkurunziza-led faction, consisting of 20,000 to 22,000 troops signed a ceasefire with the government in December 2002 but continued fighting. The faction led by Ndayikengurukiye became the lesser of the two with about 5,000 fighters. It also signed a ceasefire with the government in October 2002 to which it has roughly held.

At an official ceremony in January 2005, the group registered as a legal political party. Months later, in the largely peaceful parliamentary elections on 4 July 2005, the CNDD–FDD won an estimated 60 to 80 percent of the vote, making it likely that a CNDD–FDD representative would be chosen the president in August. Pierre Nkurunziza indeed was elected President of Burundi unopposed on August 19. At the legislative elections, the party won 57.8% and 64 out of 118 seats.

In March 2012, Pascal Nyabenda was elected as President of CNDD–FDD. Then on 20 August 2016, General Évariste Ndayishimiye was, in the extraordinary congress that took place in Gitega, elected as the Secretary General of the Party.

In June 2020, Nkurunziza died while still serving as President of Burundi and was succeeded by Ndayishimiye. Prior to Nkurunziza's death, Ndayishimiye had been elected President of Burundi in elections which were held in May 2020. Former Senate president Révérien Ndikuriyo, a hardliner, was chosen as the Secretary General of the CNDD–FDD in January 2021.

== Youth wing ==
The party's youth wing, known as the Imbonerakure (from the Kirundi for "Those who see far") have been accused by international human rights organizations and the political as being auxiliary to local law enforcement and the military. Human Rights Watch has documented claims that members of Imbonerakure have harassed, arbitrarily detained, tortured, and killed alleged members of opponent parties and militias on behalf of the country's security forces, especially since Évariste Ndayishimiye became the president in 2020.

Members of the National Congress for Liberty have been killed, attacked, arbitrarily arrested, and had their party offices destroyed by the Imbonerakure. In 2023, local human rights group Ligue Iteka reported that the group had killed 284 people by the end of August.

While there is no exact number detailing members in the Imbonerakure, the group is primarily made up of young people between the ages of 18 and 35 and is almost entirely Hutu.

== Electoral history ==
=== Presidential elections ===
Election	Party candidate	Votes	%	Result
President elected by National Assembly and Senate
2005	Pierre Nkurunziza	151	94.4%	Elected ✓
President elected by popular vote
2010	Pierre Nkurunziza	2,479,483	91.62%	Elected ✓
2015	Pierre Nkurunziza	1,961,510	69.41%	Elected ✓
2020	Évariste Ndayishimiye	3,082,210	71.45%	Elected ✓

=== National Assembly elections ===
Election	Leader	Votes	%	Seats	+/–	Position	Result
2005	Hussein Radjabu	1,417,800	58.55%	64 / 118	New	1st	Majority government
2010	Jérémie Ngendakumana	1,848,023	81.19%	81 / 106	▲17	1st	Supermajority government
2015	Pascal Nyabenda	1,721,629	60.28%	86 / 121	▲5	1st	Supermajority government
2020	Pascal Nyabenda	3,036,286	70.98%	86 / 123	0	1st	Supermajority government
2025	Évariste Ndayishimiye	5,654,807	96.51%	108 / 111	▲22	1st	Supermajority government

=== Senate elections ===
Election	Leader	Seats	+/–	Position	Result
2005	Hussein Radjabu	32 / 49	New	1st	Governing majority
2010	Jérémie Ngendakumana	32 / 41	0	1st	Governing supermajority
2015	Pascal Nyabenda	33 / 43	▲1	1st	Governing supermajority
2020	Pascal Nyabenda	34 / 43	▲1	1st	Governing supermajority
2025	Révérien Ndikuriyo	10 / 13	▼24	1st	Governing supermajority
