= Senate of Burundi (2005) =

The 2005 Senate of Burundi sat from 2005 to 2010.

== History ==
In a popular referendum on 28 February 2005 the people of Burundi overwhelmingly approved a post-transitional constitution. Senate members were indirectly elected on 29 July 2005 by an electoral college of commune and provincial councils. The National Council for the Defense of Democracy-Forces for the Defense of Democracy (CNDD-FDD), which obtained the majority of seats in communal elections held in June, won an overwhelming majority (30) of the seats. The Front for Democracy in Burundi (FRODEBU) won 3 seats, while the remaining seat went the National Council for the Defense of Democracy (CNDD), a breakaway faction of the CNDD-FDD.

== Summary of election results ==
Following the National Assembly elections, the Senate was indirectly elected on 29 July. Of the 49 Senate members, 34 were elected by electoral colleges formed by councillors, three were co-opted Twas, four were former Presidents, and eight further members were co-opted to ensure that at least 30% of its members were women. A total of 119 candidates stood for election to the Senate.

Party	Votes	%	Seats		
Party	Votes	%	Elected	Co-opted	Total
CNDD–FDD			30	2	32
Front for Democracy in Burundi			3	2	5
National Council for the Defense of Democracy			1	2	3
Union for National Progress			0	2	2
Co-opted Twa members			–	3	3
Former presidents			–	4	4
Total			34	15	49
Valid votes	1,097	50.76			
Invalid/blank votes	1,064	49.24			
Total votes	2,161	100.00			
Registered voters/turnout	3,225	67.01			
Source: African Elections Database, IPU

== Members ==
Members of the post-transitional senate elected in 2005 were:

Province	Surname, given name	Ethnicity	Gender	Party	elected / coopted
Bubanza Province	Nimbesha, Richard	Hutu	M	CNDD-FDD	elected
Bubanza Province	Rugira, Jean-Marie	Tutsi	M	CNDD-FDD	elected
Bubanza Province	Habanabashaka, Pétronie	Hutu	F	CNDD-FDD	coopted
Bujumbura Rural Province	Ndabaneze, Laurent	Hutu	M	FRODEBU	elected
Bujumbura Rural Province	Baragengana, Rénovat	Tutsi	M	FRODEBU	elected
Bururi Province	Munyembabazi, William	Hutu	M	CNDD	elected
Bururi Province	Bimazubute, Générose	Tutsi	F	FRODEBU	elected
Bururi Province	Nzoyisaba, Catherine	Tutsi	F	U-PRONA	coopted
Bururi Province	Ndakoze, Monique	Tutsii	F	CNDD	coopted
Bururi Province	Bayaga, Evariste	Twa	M	-	coopted
Cankuzo Province	Baranyizigiye, Jacqueline	Hutu	F	CNDD-FDD	elected
Cankuzo Province	Harushingingo, Balbatus	Tutsi	M	CNDD-FDD	elected
Cibitoke Province	Manirakiza, Anatole	Hutu	M	CNDD-FDD	elected
Cibitoke Province	Ngayabihema, Phocas	Tutsi	M	CNDD-FDD	elected
Gitega Province	Rufyikiri, Gervais	Hutu	M	CNDD-FDD	elected
Gitega Province	Busuguru, Déo	Tutsii	M	CNDD-FDD	elected
Gitega Province	Bizimana, Clothilde	Hutu	F	FRODEBU	coopted
Karuzi Province	Nicayenzi, Jérome	Hutu	M	CNDD-FDD	elected
Karuzi Province	Rugema, Charles	Tutsi	M	CNDD-FDD	elected
Karuzi Province	Abdallah, Zattune	Hutu	F	UPRONA	coopted
Kayanza Province	Nzikoruriho, Yollande	Hutu	F	CNDD-FDD	elected
Kayanza Province	Hakizimana, Emilien	Tutsi	M	CNDD-FDD	elected
Kayanza Province	Nzitonda, Libérate	Tutsi	F	CNDD-FDD	coopted
Kirundo Province	Musoro, Pascal	Hutu	M	CNDD-FDD	elected
Kirundo Province	Rivuzumwami, Philippe	Tutsi	M	CNDD-FDD	elected
Kirundo Province	Masabo, Charles	Twa	M	-	coopted
Makamba Province	Niyungeko, Patricie	Hutu	F	CNDD-FDD	elected
Makamba Province	Ntacano, Oscar	Tutsi	M	CNDD-FDD	elected
Muramvya Province	Nicimbesha, Laurent	Hutu	M	CNDD-FDD	elected
Muramvya Province	Biha André,	Tutsi	M	CNDD-FDD	elected
Muramvya Province	Ndayishimiye, Adélaïde	Hutu	F	FRODEBU	coopted
Muyinga Province	Radjabu, Yassin	Hutu	M	CNDD-FDD	elected
Muyinga Province	Niyonzima, Jeanne-chantal	Tutsii	F	CNDD-FDD	elected
Muyinga Province	Saidi, Joha	Tutsi	F	CNDD	coopted
Muyinga Province	Karenzo, Pélagie	Twa	F	-	coopted
Mwaro Province	Kekenwa, Jérémie	Hutu	M	CNDD-FDD	elected
Mwaro Province	Ndikuriyo, Faustin	Tutsi	M	CNDD-FDD	elected
Ngozi Province	Caraziwe, Clotilde	Hutu	F	CNDD-FDD	elected
Ngozi Province	Ntwari, Antoine	Tutsi	M	CNDD-FDD	elected
Rutana Province	Cegetera, Audace	Hutu	M	CNDD-FDD	elected
Rutana Province	Vyubusa, Zozime	Tutsi	M	CNDD-FDD	elected
Ruyigi Province	Ntureka, Louis	Hutu	M	CNDD-FDD	elected
Ruyigi Province	Arakaza, Claudette	Tutsi	F	CNDD-FDD	elected
Bujumbura Mairie Province	Nakanyana, Générose	Hutu	F	CNDD-FDD	elected
Bujumbura Mairie Province	Rukara, Mohamed	Tutsi	M	CNDD-FDD	elected

== Sources ==
- Arret No RCCB 148 (PDF) (in French), Constitutional Court of Burundi, 8 August 2005
- Burundi (06/09), U.S. State Department
