= University of Mwaro =

Private university in Burundi

- Université de Mwaro
- Type: Private University
- Established: 2001; 25 years ago
- Students: about 1,000 (in 2011)
- Location: Kibumbu, Mwaro Province, Burundi; 3.53083°S 29.74520°E
- Language: French
- Website: www.umo.edu.bi
- Location within Burundi

The University of Mwaro (French: Université de Mwaro) is a private university in the Commune of Kayokwe, Mwaro Province, Burundi.

== Location ==
The University of Mwaro is south of the town of Kibumbu in the Commune of Kayokwe, Mwaro Province. It is southeast of the Kibumbu Sanatorium and south of the Kibumbu Hospital. To the north the RN18 highway runs west through Kibumbu to the nearby city of Mwaro.

== History ==
The University of Mwaro was opened on 11 October 2001. It originally had two faculties and an institute. For each of these, the university awarded a bachelor 's degree (in law, in administration and management and in paramedical sciences and techniques). In 2005 the law and administration faculties were suspended. They were closed due to lack of students, and only the paramedical sciences institute remained open.

In 2012 the university launched new paramedical courses in Nursing and Midwifery. In 2013 it opened courses in Anesthesia / Resuscitation and Laboratory. In 2014 the university had approximately 500 desktop computers, donated by a British charity. The university was using some of the machines, and selling others to individuals, public administrations, local authorities and some educational establishments.

In November 2014 the university changed the name of the nursing department from "nursing sciences" to "nursing care". Some of the 300 students opposed the change, since they were concerned that the nature of the courses would change and their qualification would not be recognized by the Ministry of Higher Education. In January 2015 sixteen second year nursing students representing their classmates were expelled from the university. Despite a request from the Minister of Higher Education, the rector had not let students return to their classes by April that year.

In March 2016 the university opened a clinic on its campus. The purpose was to treat patients, teach medical students and support research. Services included emergency service, hospitalization, internal medicine, operating room and surgery, maternity service. Incubator were available for premature births.

As of 2016 the university offered five courses: paramedical sciences and techniques; midwivery; nursing; general anesthesia; and laboratory. It has issued more than 1500 diplomas since being founded. In January 2017 it awarded diplomas to 345 graduates of the 2015–2016 academic year.

In March 2020 the university became the first in Burundi to have Wi-Fi coverage throughout the Kibumbu campus, through a donation by the American company Cambium Networks.

In April 2021 Prosper Bazombanza, vice-president of Burundi, participated in a ceremony at the Kibumbu campus that marked the graduation of over 400 students and the opening of the 2020–2021 academic year.

As of 2023 the university had two campuses. The faculty of Health Sciences was located at Kibumbu, and included three streams for nursing, laboratory, and anesthesia and resuscitation. There were also courses on accounting and management, community development and the university clinic. At Bujumbura, over 450 students were studying subjects such as business administration and management, accounting and management, and community development.

== Sources ==
- "About University of Mwaro", Africa2Trust
- Bienvenue au Site Web de l'Université de Mwaro, University of Mwaro, archived from the original on 2013-09-20
- "Burundi : 345 jeunes diplômés de l'Université de Mwaro", AGnews (in French), 16 January 2017
- "Etudiants malmenés à Mwaro et à l'université du Burundi", Radio Publique Africaine (in French), 21 April 2015
- Hakizimana, Placide (22 March 2016), "Une clinique universitaire voit le jour à Mwaro", Radio Télévision Nationale du Burundi (in French)
- Impact positif de la jeune université de Mwaro sur le développement local (in French), 21 January 2014
- "Le pas franchi par l'Université de Mwaro est appréciable", Agence Burundaise de Presse (in French), 1 August 2023
- "MWARO University now has WI-FI coverage", AGnews (in French), 13 March 2020
- Nahimana, Pascal (18 April 2021), "Début de l'année académique 2020-2021 à l'Université de MWARO", Burundi-forum (in French)
- Ordonnance ministérielle #610/2345
- Ouverture de la sixième université privée du Burundi (in French), 12 November 2001
- Shaka, Clarisse (17 February 2015), "Université de Mwaro : un changement de nom qui tourne au vinaigre", Iwacu (in French)
- "University De Mwaro", Google Maps
- "Way: Hopital Kibumbu (786207328)", OpenStreetMap
