= Senate of Burundi (2015) =

The 2015 Senate of Burundi sat from 2015 to 2020.

== Members ==
Senators elected in 2015 were:

Province	Name	Ethnicity	Party
Bubanza Province
Bururi Province	Agripine Nduwimana	Hutu	CNDD-FDD
Bururi Province	Anicet Niyongabo (Note: In Bururi province Athanase Hatungimana, alias Cokoroko, intendant of the Head of State and Tutsi was elected in the CNDD-FDD platform in 2015. But according to CEPI BURURI; the latter was replaced by Anicet Niyongabo of UPRONA upon an injunction from above.'"`UNIQ--ref-00000001-QINU`"')	Tutsi	UPRONA
Bujumbura Province	Pascal Tahonzigamiye	Hutu	CNDD-FDD
Bujumbura Province	Evelyne Butoyi	Tutsi	CNDD-FDD
Cankuzo Province	Salvator Bigirimana	Hutu	CNDD-FDD
Cankuzo Province	vérérande Nizigiyimana	Tutsi	CNDD-FDD
Cibitoke Province	Alexis Barekebavuge	Hutu	CNDD-FDD
Cibitoke Province	Ida Ndikumazambo	Tutsi	CNDD-FDD
Gitega Province	Déo Busuguru	Tutsi	CNDD-FDD
Gitega Province	spès Carits Njebarikanuye	Hutu	CNDD-FDD
Karuzi Province
Kayanza Province	Martin Niteretse	Hutu	CNDD-FDD
Kayanza Province	Victoire Nahimana	Tutsi	CNDD-FDD
Kirundo Province	Jean-Marie Muhirwa	Hutu	CNDD-FDD
Kirundo Province	Jenifer Kankindi	Tutsi	CNDD-FDD
Makamba Province	Révérien Ndikuriyo	Hutu	CNDD-FDD
Makamba Province	Anesie Mfatiyimana	Tutsi	CNDD-FDD
Muramvya Province	Gloriose Hakizimana	Hutu	CNDD-FDD
Muramvya Province	Emmanuel Niyonkuru	Tutsi	CNDD-FDD
Mwaro Province	Apollinaire Sindayikengera	Hutu	CNDD-FDD
Mwaro Province	Agnès Gahwayi	Tutsi	CNDD-FDD
Ngozi Province	Joseph Ntakarutimana	Tutsi	CNDD-FDD
Ngozi Province	charlotte Uwimana	Tutsi	CNDD-FDD.
Rutana Province	Jean Dieudonné Cubwa	Hutu	CNDD-FDD
Rutana Province	Jacqueline Sinzotuma	Tutsi	CNDD-FDD
Rumonge Province
Ruyigi Province	Bénoite Nizigiyimana	Hutu	CNDD-FDD
Ruyigi Province	Bède Mbayahaga	Tutsi	CNDD-FDD
Mairie de Bujumbura	Rémy Barampama	Hutu	CNDD-FDD
Mairie de Bujumbura	Emelance Ahishakiye	Tutsi	CNDD-FDD

== Sources ==
- Burundi : Liste des sénateurs élus, résultats des élections Sénatoriales du 24 juillet 2015 (in French), 26 July 2015
