= Kibumbu =

- Location in Burundi
- Coordinates: 3.5284°S 29.7384°E
- Country: Burundi
- Province: Mwaro Province

Kibumbu is a town in Mwaro Province, Burundi.

The Kibumbu Hospital is a public district hospital in the Kibumbu Health District serving a population of 142,244 as of 2014. It is in the town of Kibumbu. The hospital is to the south of the RN18 highway, which leads to the nearby city of Mwaro to the west. The Kibumbu Sanatorium is just west of the hospital. The University of Mwaro is just south of the hospital.

== Sources ==
- Carte Sanitaire du Burundi (PDF), Burundi Ministry of Public Health, 2016
- Financement base sur la performance HD Kibumbu (in French), Ministere de la Sante Publique et de la Lutte Contre le Sida
- "University De Mwaro", Google Maps
- "Way: Hopital Kibumbu (786207328)", OpenStreetMap
