= Kibumbu Hospital =

Geography
- Location: Mwaro Province, Burundi
- Coordinates: 3.53083°S 29.74520°E

Organisation
- Care system: Public

Links
- Lists: Hospitals in Burundi

The Kibumbu District Hospital (French: Hôpital de District Kibumbu) is a hospital in Mwaro Province, Burundi.

== Location ==
The Kibumbu Hospital is a public district hospital in the Kibumbu Health District serving a population of 142,244 as of 2014. It is in the city of Kibumbu. As of 2016 it was the main hospital in the district. The only other hospital was the Sanatorium de Kibumbu. The hospital is to the south of the RN18 highway, which leads to the nearby city of Mwaro to the west. The Sanatorium de Kibumbu is just west of the hospital. The University of Mwaro is just south of the hospital.

== Events ==
In 2013 the directors of Kibumbu hospital said they would require police and military patients to pay 20% of care fees, while the other 80% were paid by the Mutuelle de la Fonction Publique. The reason was that the police and military had not being paying their bills regularly. The Ministry of Public Health and the Fight against AIDS and other government organizations were also behind in payments to the hospital, which was facing difficulty in obtaining medicines.

== Sources ==
- Carte Sanitaire du Burundi (PDF), Burundi Ministry of Public Health, 2016
- Financement base sur la performance HD Kibumbu (in French), Ministere de la Sante Publique et de la Lutte Contre le Sida
- Ndabashinze, Rénovat (8 December 2013), "Policiers et militaires indésirables à l'hôpital de Kibumbu", Iwacu
- "University De Mwaro", Google Maps
- "Way: Hopital Kibumbu (786207328)", OpenStreetMap
