= Belgium–Democratic Republic of the Congo relations =

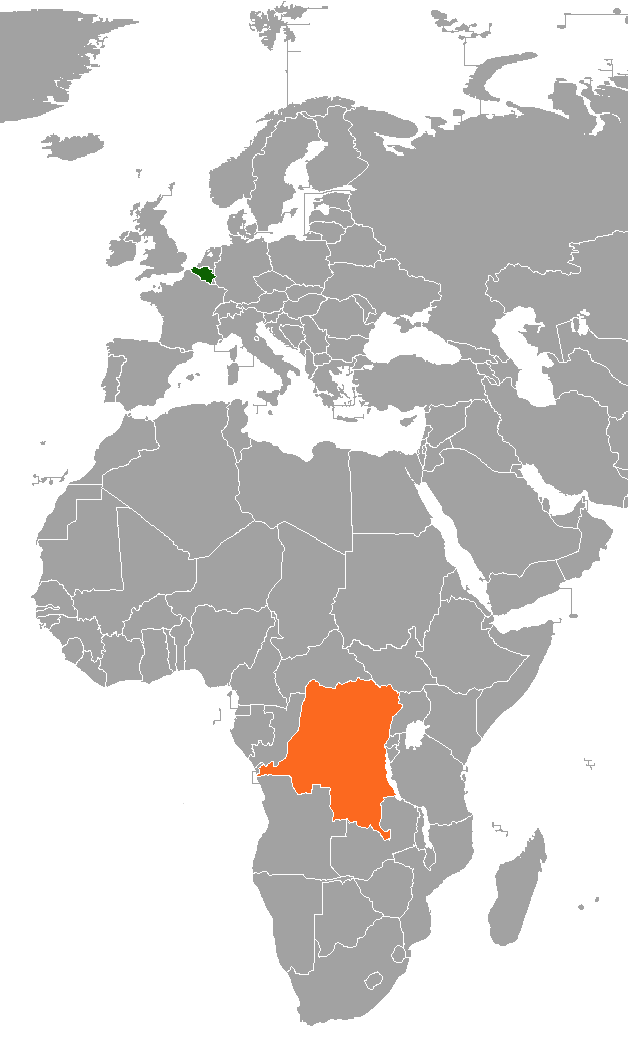
- Belgium: DR Congo

Belgium–Democratic Republic of the Congo relations refers to relations between the Kingdom of Belgium and the Democratic Republic of the Congo. The relationship started with the exploration of the Congo River by Henry Morton Stanley.

Belgium has an embassy in Kinshasa and a consulate-general in Lubumbashi. The DR Congo has an embassy in Brussels and a consulate-general in Antwerp. Both nations are members of the Organisation internationale de la Francophonie and the United Nations, alongside Rwanda, who is also a member of both organizations.

== History ==
Following Stanley's expedition to the Congo, King Leopold II initially ruled Congo as his personal property following the Berlin Conference. On 18 October 1908, the Belgian parliament voted to annex the Congo Free State; on 15 November 1908, Leopold formally relinquished personal control over the state to Belgium, forming the Belgian Congo. During the Free State period, Congo was reputed to have been brutalised by a harsh economic policy that entailed rubber production quotas to be met by forced labour. Other crops were also farmed in the Congo.

== Political ties ==
Shortly after the Congo's independence in 1960, relations between Belgium and the Congo deteriorated and the Congolese government severed relations and ordered the expulsion of Ambassador Jean van den Bosch. France assumed responsibility for representing Belgian interests in the Congo.

After fifty years of Congo's independence, a visit by the Belgian King Albert II was met with controversy as the king's brother, Baudouin, was said to have been connected to the assassination of Patrice Lumumba, and Lumumba's family sought to bring a case against 12 Belgians claiming Lumumba's torture and murder constituted war crimes.

Amidst other controversies, Congo's Minister of Communication, Lambert Mende Omalanga, described an "unacceptable attitude of the Belgian political class to consider the Congolese problems as internal affairs of their country," following such allegations as the "very bizarre case of a purely imaginary invitation of Belgian soldiers to participate in the military parade in Kinshasa," amongst others. He then said "coloniser to colonised relations is over." The Belgian Minister for Development Cooperation, Charles Michel, then expressed surprise at the remarks and demanded respect for Belgium.

During a visit by a Belgian cabinet delegation in 2008 to the Congo, President Joseph Kabila said he did not appreciate a message brought by the team in regards to human rights issues. Kabila said: "Belgium must make a choice on the type of relationship it wants to have with the Democratic Republic of Congo. It has a choice between having good relations as partners in a mature relationship with a sovereign and independent state or a master-slave relationship. I will note that every time a Belgian delegation is led by the minister of foreign affairs; it is with a lot of arrogance, as if our visitors are coming here to lecture us. This is unacceptable. The Congo will never accept this, definitely not me."

In December 2016, when President Kabila announced the postponement of elections and that he would not be stepping down despite the end of his constitutional mandate, the Belgian government announced that it would "re-examine" its relations with the DRC. The Belgian government also advised its citizens to not visit the DRC due to the political unrest. In April 2017, it was announced that the Congolese government informed the Belgian military attaché in Kinshasa that DR Congo would suspend military cooperation with Belgium, after foreign minister Didier Reynders criticized President Kabila's choice of the new Prime Minister, Bruno Tshibala.

On 30 June 2020, King Philippe of Belgium expressed his "deep regrets", but not apologies, for the atrocities in the Congo Free State in a letter to the Congolese president. In June 2022, King Philippe of Belgium, returned a mask, called Kakungu, which was used during healing ceremonies by the Suku people, and previously exhibited at the Royal Museum for Central Africa, during a week-long visit to DR Congo at the invitation of President Félix Tshisekedi. In addition, in a speech on the grounds of the Congolese parliament in Kinshasa, he formally condemned the atrocities that occurred when DR Congo was a Belgian colony, saying the colonial government "was one of unequal relations, unjustifiable in itself, marked by paternalism, discrimination and racism".

== Military cooperation ==
Belgium had founded the Force Publique and trained officers of Mobutu Sese Seko's army. It took a leading role in the European Union effort to build a new national army (the FARDC) after the Second Congo War. In December 2004, Belgium and South Africa signed a tripartite agreement with the Transitional Government of the Democratic Republic of the Congo to provide training and integrate select Congolese units into the FARDC at six integration centers, while demobilizing fighters that were unfit. Belgium trained the 1st Brigade at Kisangani between January and June 2004, and partially trained the 3rd Brigade at Kamina with South Africa. It also pledged to fully equip three brigades and partially equip another three. Between 2008 and 2017, Belgian Armed Forces personnel assisted with the formation of the FARDC's 31st Rapid Reaction Brigade at Kindu, Maniema Province.

From April 2022, about 30 Belgian instructors from the Special Operations Regiment were deployed to Kindu, Maniema Province, to train Congolese soldiers of the 31st Rapid Reaction Brigade. In April 2024, 3,000 soldiers of the brigade completed their training under Belgian supervision at the Camp Lwama commando training center in Kindu. The assistance was in the context of the M23 campaign.

Rwandan media claimed that on 17 March 2025, after the fall of Goma and Bukavu to M23 rebels, Belgium deployed 300 to 400 commandos, along with tanks and drones, to Kindu. They were to provide training to the 31st Brigade and to take part in fighting at the front line. Belgian Foreign Minister Maxime Prévot denied the claim, saying that only six Belgian personnel were in Kindu, only to provide support. Rwandan media later claimed in April 2025 that eight Belgian soldiers had been killed in Walikale Territory, North Kivu. In May 2025, there were reports of Belgian troops assisting the FARDC in North Kivu, being deployed with Congolese commandos as "instructors". They were allegedly involved in drone strikes and reconnaissance. During 2025, there were increased Belgian Air Force transport flights between Europe and different cities in the DRC and Burundi.

== See also ==
- Germany–Rwanda relations
- Belgium-Rwanda relations
- Belgium–Germany relations
- Democratic Republic of the Congo–Rwanda border
- Democratic Republic of the Congo–Rwanda relations
- List of ambassadors of the Democratic Republic of the Congo to Belgium
