= Kibumbu Sanatorium =

Geography
- Location: Mwaro Province, Burundi
- Coordinates: 3.53357°S 29.73913°E

Organisation
- Care system: Public

Links
- Lists: Hospitals in Burundi

The Kibumbu Sanatorium (French: Sanatorium de Kibumbu) is a specialist hospital in Mwaro Province, Burundi, where tuberculosis case are treated.

== Location ==
The Kibumbu Sanatorium is in the town of Kibumbu. As of 2016 the only other hospital in the district was Kibumbu District Hospital. The sanatorium is west of the Kibumbu Hospital, and south of the RN18 highway, which leads to the nearby city of Mwaro to the west. The University of Mwaro is southeast of the sanatorium.

A small hydroelectric plant driven by the Mushwaburu river was installed in 1953 to supply 56kW of power to the sanatorium. It is no longer in service. The hospital is set in a wooded area near the homes of the local people. Children would visit the woods to collect firewood or the look after livestock, and were at risk of catching the infection, which spreads through the air. A fence was due to be installed to 2013.

== Treatment ==
As of 2006 tuberculosis was the third greatest health problem in Burundi after malaria and HIV/AIDS. Half the tuberculosis patients also had HIV/AIDS. In 2012, the Ministry of Public Health recorded 7,016 sensitive tuberculosis cases and 35 multidrug-resistant tuberculosis cases in Burundi. These numbers understated the total due to lack of screening resources.

In 2013 there were 25 patients at the sanatorium, including ten women. The number of known cases of tuberculosis had increased from the previous year due to improvements in examination of suspected cases. It now took one year to treat multi-resistant tuberculosis. In the first four months the patient would receive injections at the hospital, and in the next eight months would take tablets at their local health center. The sanatorium was experimenting in 2013 with a new treatment regime using moxifloxacin, which would reduce the duration of treatment to nine months, with corresponding cost savings.

As of 2014 the hospital was one of four specialist hospitals in Burundi, the others being the Kamenge Neuropsychiatric Center for mental health, the Kamenge Military Hospital for traumatology and the Kamenge University Hospital.

== Sources ==
- "25 malades de la tuberculose au sanatorium de Kibumbu", Iwacu (in French), 5 May 2013
- Carte Sanitaire du Burundi (PDF), Burundi Ministry of Public Health, 2016
- "Kibumbu", Energypedia
- Ngendakumana, Philippe (4 September 2013), "Tuberculose : désormais, des soins gratuits pour les malades burundais dans l'Afrique de l'Est", Iwacu (in French)
- Nkurunziza, Médiatrice (31 October 2014), Analyse du recours aux soins obstétricaux au Burundi: Déterminants et motivations (in French), Presses universitaires de Louvain, ISBN 978-2-87558-376-5
- "University De Mwaro", Google Maps
- "Way: Sanatorium (786207087)", OpenStreetMap
