= Democratic Republic of the Congo–Rwanda border =

International border

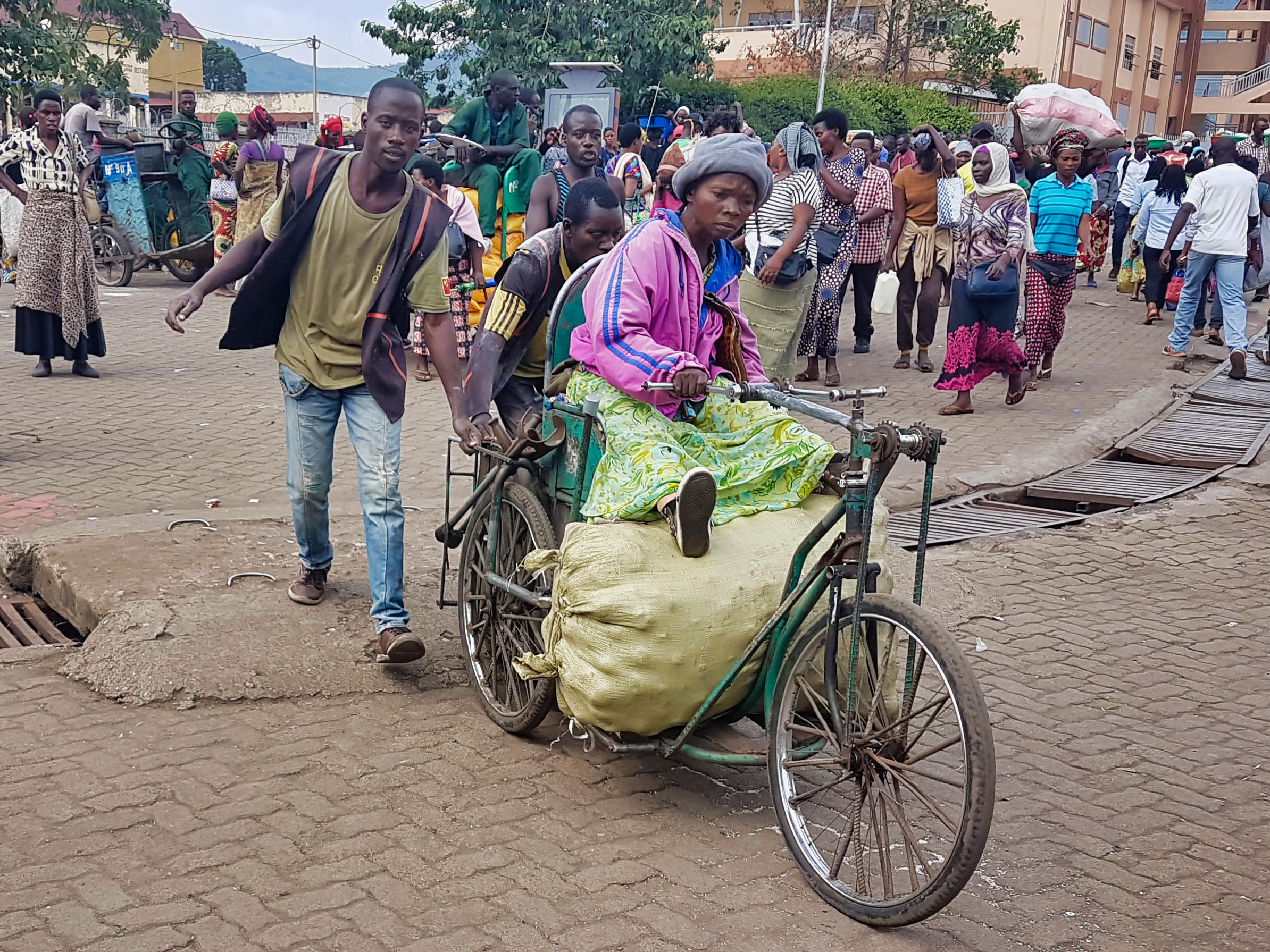
- Traders at the border between Goma and Gisenyi, which are both the same city split by the border

Characteristics
- Entities: Democratic Republic of the Congo Rwanda
- Length: 217 kilometres (135 mi)

The border between the countries of Rwanda and the Democratic Republic of the Congo is 221 kilometers long. Crossing Lake Kivu in its entirety through the Virunga Mountains down to Mount Karisimbi, it divides the cities of Goma/Gisenyi and Bukavu/Cyangugu. In 1885, Leopold II, King of the Belgians personally claimed the Congo Free State (later as the Belgian Congo), a vast territory in Central Africa, and it became his personal colony. The city of Léopoldville (present-day Kinshasa) was named in his honor. After the Berlin Conference led by the German chancellor Otto von Bismarck in Berlin, the German East Africa was a larger territory of Germany, and Kigali was later established as a German administrative center in 1907. During the First World War, the Belgian Congo led by the Force Publique invaded the German territory in East Africa that launched an offensive of Tabora in 1916 as the Germans were forced to surrender their territory to the Belgians. After the war, the League of Nations formalized the Belgian administration of Ruanda-Urundi through a "Class B" mandate in 1922. On 30 June 1960, after the Belgo-Congolese Round Table Conference in Brussels, the Congo finally achieved independence from Belgium. On 1 July 1962, with the Rwandan Revolution as well as the abolition of Kigeli V Ndahindurwa as Mwami of Rwanda had concluded, Rwanda also gained independence from Belgian rule as the "Republic of Rwanda". With Mobutu in power as the dictator of Zaire from 1971 until his overthrow in 1997 with the First Congo War, following the Rwandan genocide that has providing refuge and support to Hutu militia and elements of the defeated Rwandan army who had participated in the genocide. In October 1996, Laurent Kabila's AFDL, with support from Rwanda, launched an offensive in eastern Zaire against the Mobutu dictatorship. In 1997, as they steadily gained ground, capturing key towns and advancing towards the capital which later forced Mobutu to flee on 17 May by heading for exile in Morocco where he later died in September that same year.

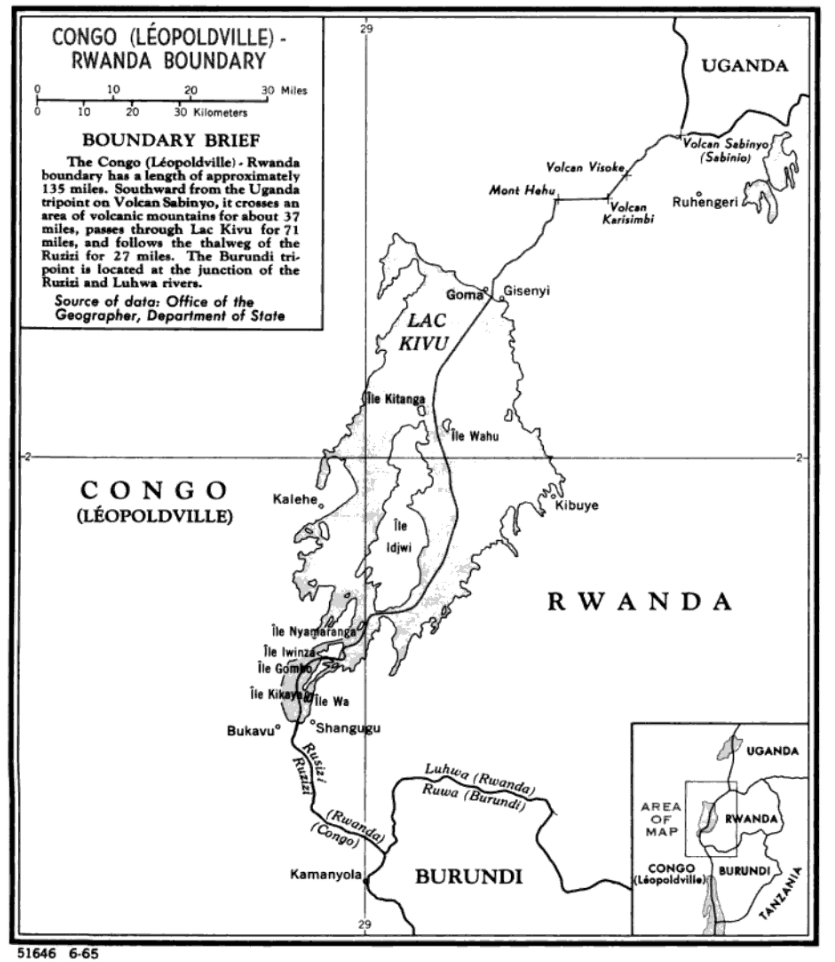
Border map from 1965

There was a brief border clash between the two countries in 2012, which resulted in a few soldiers being killed. Additional alleged cross-border shellings happened during a period of heightened tensions between the two countries.

== See also ==
- Belgium–Congo relations
- Germany–Rwanda relations
- Democratic Republic of the Congo–Rwanda relations
