= Emmanuel Ndemeye =

Senator for Kirundo Province, Burundi
- In office 2010–2015
- Preceded by: Pascal Musoro
- Succeeded by: Jean-Marie Muhirwa

Emmanuel Ndemeye is a politician who was elected senator for Kirundo Province, Burundi in 2010.

== Career ==
Members of the senate elected for Kirundo Province on 28 July 2010 were Emmanuel Ndemeye (Hutu) and Jenipher Kankindi (Tutsi), both candidates of the National Council for the Defense of Democracy – Forces for the Defense of Democracy (CNDD-FDD). It was said that neither had attended university. Vital Bambanze was coopted as Twa representative for Kirundo.

In July 2015 the senators elected for the province of Kirundo were Jean-Marie Muhirwa, Hutu, and Jenifer Kankindi, Tutsi. Both were candidates of the CNDD-FDD.

On 18 February 2016 President Pierre Nkurunziza named Ndemeye a member of the 49-member National Land and Other Property Commission.

== Sources ==
- Arret RCCB 240 rendu par la cour constitutionnelle du Burundi portant sur la regularite des elections senatoriales du 28 juillet 2010 et la proclamation des resultats definitifs (PDF) (in French), cour constitutionnelle du Burundi
- Decret no 100/40 du 18 Fevrier 2016 portant nomination des membres de la commission nationale des terres et autres biens (CNTB) (PDF) (in French), Presidency of Burundi
- "Nouvelles locales du mercredi 28 juillet 2010", Arib News (in French), 29 July 2010
- "Sénatoriales en cours à travers le pays", Radio Isanganiro (in French), 24 July 2015
