= Great Lakes Twa =

African Great Lakes region ethnic group

Twa

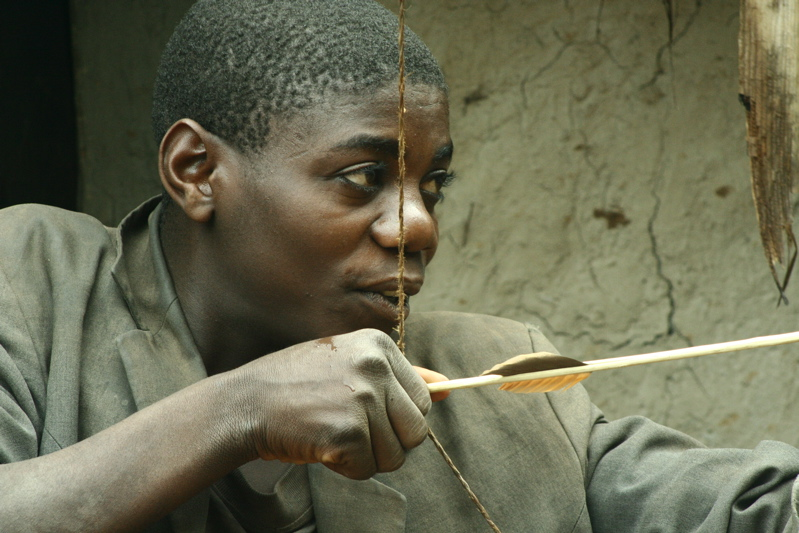
- Mutwa with traditional bow and arrow

Total population
- c. 80,000

Regions with significant populations
- Rwanda, Burundi, Democratic Republic of the Congo, Tanzania, Uganda

Languages
- Rundi, Kiga, French, English, Dutch (historically)

Religion
- Majority Mbuti mythology Minority Christian

Related ethnic groups
- Hutu, Tutsi

The Great Lakes Twa, also known as Batwa (singular Mutwa), Abatwa or Ge-Sera, are a Bantu speaking group native to the African Great Lakes region on the border of Central Africa and East Africa. As an indigenous pygmy people, the Twa are generally assumed to be the oldest surviving population of the Great Lakes region. Current populations of Great Lakes Twa people live in the states of Rwanda, Burundi, Uganda and the eastern portion of the Democratic Republic of the Congo. In 2000, they numbered approximately 80,000 people, making them a significant minority group in these countries. The largest population of Twa is located in Burundi estimated in 2008 at 78,071 people.

Apart from anthropological literature, the term "Twa" generally refers to the Twa of the Great Lakes region. There are a number of other Twa populations in the Congolese rainforests, as well as southern Twa populations living in swamps and deserts where there has never been forest, but these are little known in the West.

== History ==
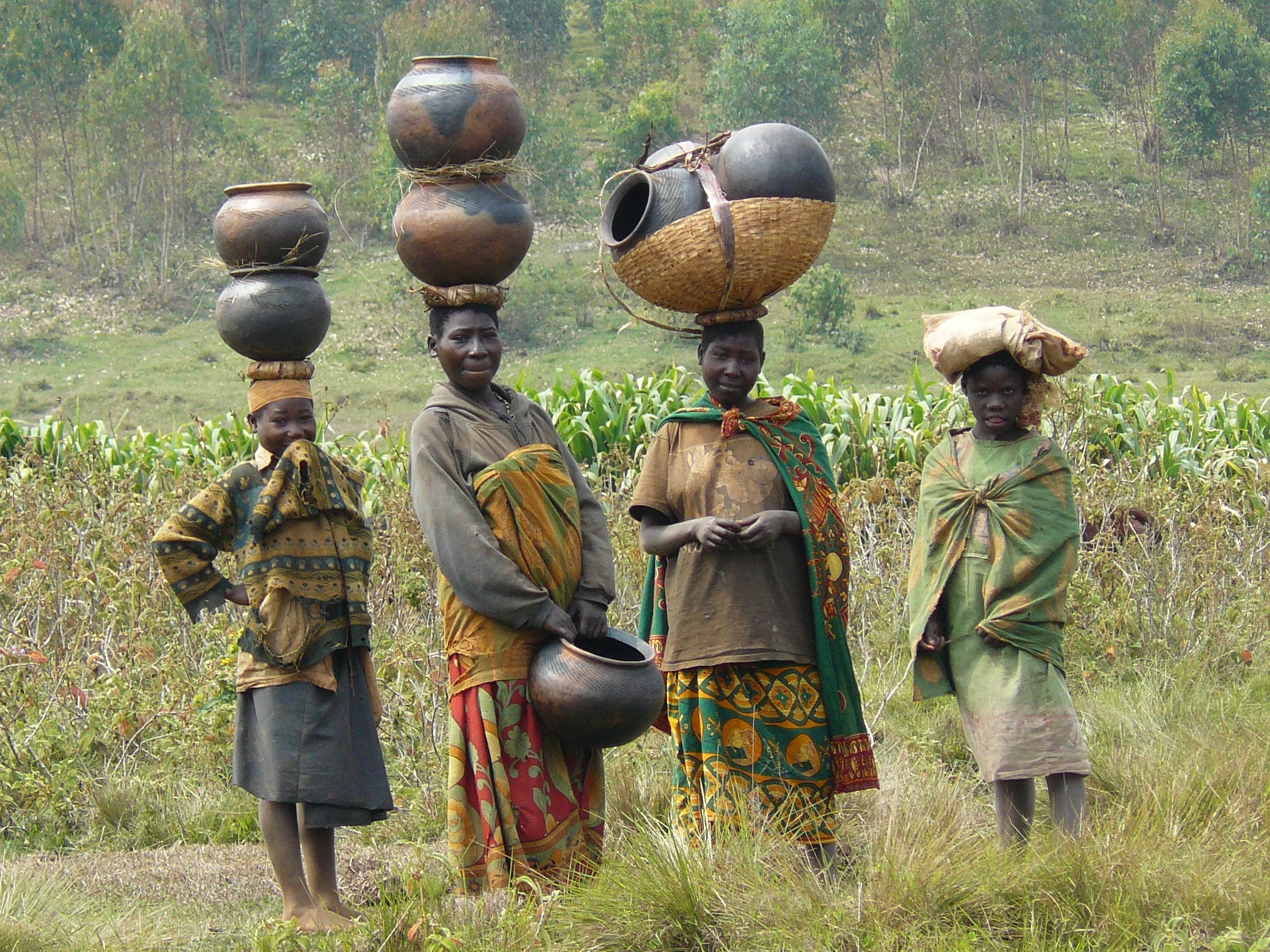
Batwa women with traditional pottery

Traditionally, the Twa have been semi-nomadic mountain forest hunter-gatherers living in association with agricultural villages, much as other pygmy peoples do.

When the Hutu, a Bantu-speaking people, arrived in the region, they subjugated 'bush people' (hunter-gatherers) they called Abatwa, which are generally assumed to be the ancestors of the Twa today, though it may be that the Twa arrived alongside the Hutu, and either were a distinct people from the original inhabitants, or have mixed ancestry. For several hundred years, the Twa have been a small minority in the area, currently 1% in Rwanda and Burundi, and have had little political role, though there were at times Twa in the government of the Tutsi king, and some even obtained a privileged position in the royal court as entertainers, or even executioners.

Unusually for Pygmies, who generally trade meat for agricultural products, iron, and pottery, the Twa are themselves potters.

The Twa are often omitted in discussions about the conflict between the Hutus and Tutsis, which reached its height in the Rwandan genocide of 1994. About 30% of the Twa population of Rwanda died in the genocide.

One of the reasons why the Twa were looked at unfavorably was because they ate sheep, which was taboo to both Tutsi and Hutus because sheep skin was used to carry babies on women's backs and sheep were believed to keep herds of cattle calm.

In Rwanda, there was a belief that sleeping with a Twa woman could cure an acute backache. Tutsis and Hutus suffering from backache would find Twa women to sleep with. Children born from these encounters were called "Abasyete" and were said to have a "different morphology". Most Abasyete were found in the Nyanza District but many were killed during the Rwandan Genocide.

The Twa of Uganda lived in the mountains of the Bwindi Impenetrable Forest until 1992, when it was made a World Heritage Site for the endangered mountain gorilla. At that time they were expelled from the forest and placed in settlements.

== Current situation ==
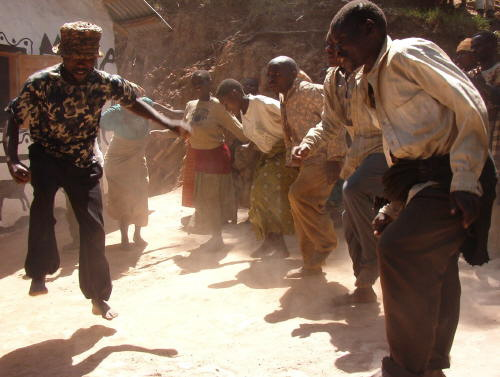
A traditional dance of the Batwa

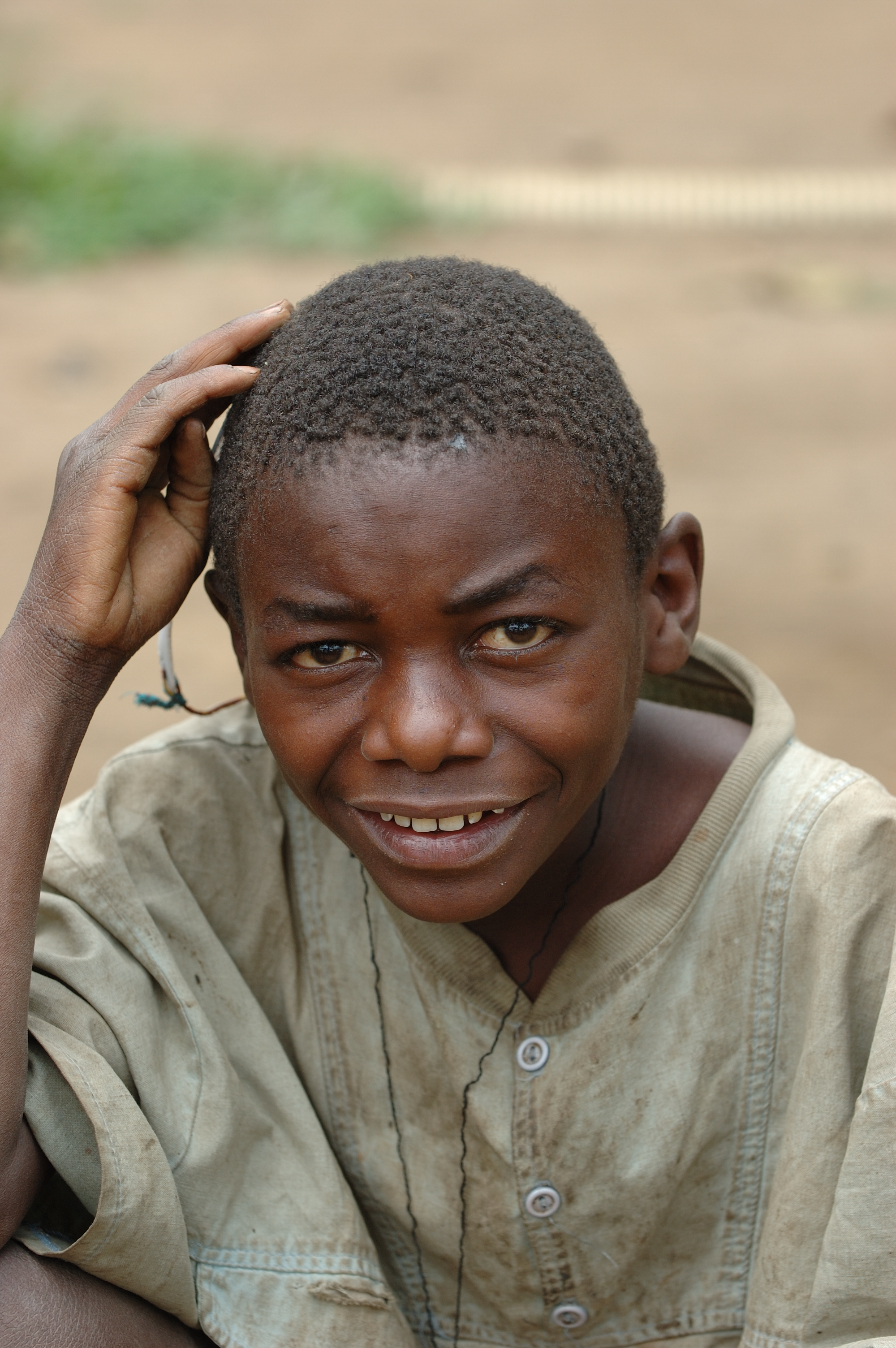
Mutwa boy in the village Shasha in North Kivu during 2007 conflicts

Due to clearing of the forests for agriculture, logging, development projects, and the creation of conservation areas, the Twa have been forced to leave the mountain forests and establish new homes. As they seek to develop new means of sustaining their communities (such as agriculture and livestock development) most are currently landless and live in poverty. The ancestral land rights of the Twa have never been recognised by their governments and no compensation has been made for lands lost.

Twa children have little access to education and their communities have limited representation in local and national government. Due to their pygmy ancestry, they continue to suffer ethnic prejudice, discrimination, violence, and general exclusion from society. Batwa men struggle with alcoholism, known to occur in communities facing cultural collapse as men can no longer carry out traditional roles and provide for families. By 2007, begging was the primary source of livelihood for 40 percent of the Batwa in Rwanda.

While the Batwa adapted to the changes in their environment by adopting new economic activities and thus traditions and identities, they continue to face challenges to their survival. Today, much of the available land, apart from areas reserved for wildlife conservation and environmental protection, is under cultivation. Unable to access their ancestral lands and practise traditional cultural and economic activities, the Batwa now perceive their pottery as an expression of their identity. Although it is no longer profitable since industrialised pottery became cheaply available, the Batwa continue to produce traditional pottery for its cultural and social significance. Not only do they consider it an ancestral tradition, but it carries a social importance in their current day society. The process of digging the clay and carrying it to their settlements allows for socialisation and a sense of community among Batwa potters. However, the marshes where the Batwa harvest clay under an informal communal tenure system are fast becoming collectivised rice-growing plantations due to a 2005 land policy change. They face another crisis as they lose another occupation that defines Batwa identity and provides social livelihood.

== Return to Kahuzi-Biega National Park ==
In 1975, the Kahuzi-Biega National Park was expanded and some 6,000 Batwa who had been living there in their ancestral home were expelled and displaced. As a result, they were living landless in host communities in poverty and destitution. After a long period of failed negotiations and broken promises with the government of the Democratic Republic of the Congo and park authorities, in 2019 they returned to the park and built new villages on what had been their land previously. In response to this, the park authorities began a campaign of organized violence to frighten the Batwa from their villages and the park and prevent them from returning. This campaign involved surprise attacks by militarized park guards with the assistance of the DRC army armed with AK-47s and belt-fed machine guns, shelling villages with mortars and rocket-propelled grenades, the group rape of Batwa women, and the mutilation of the bodies of those killed by the park guards.

== Distribution ==
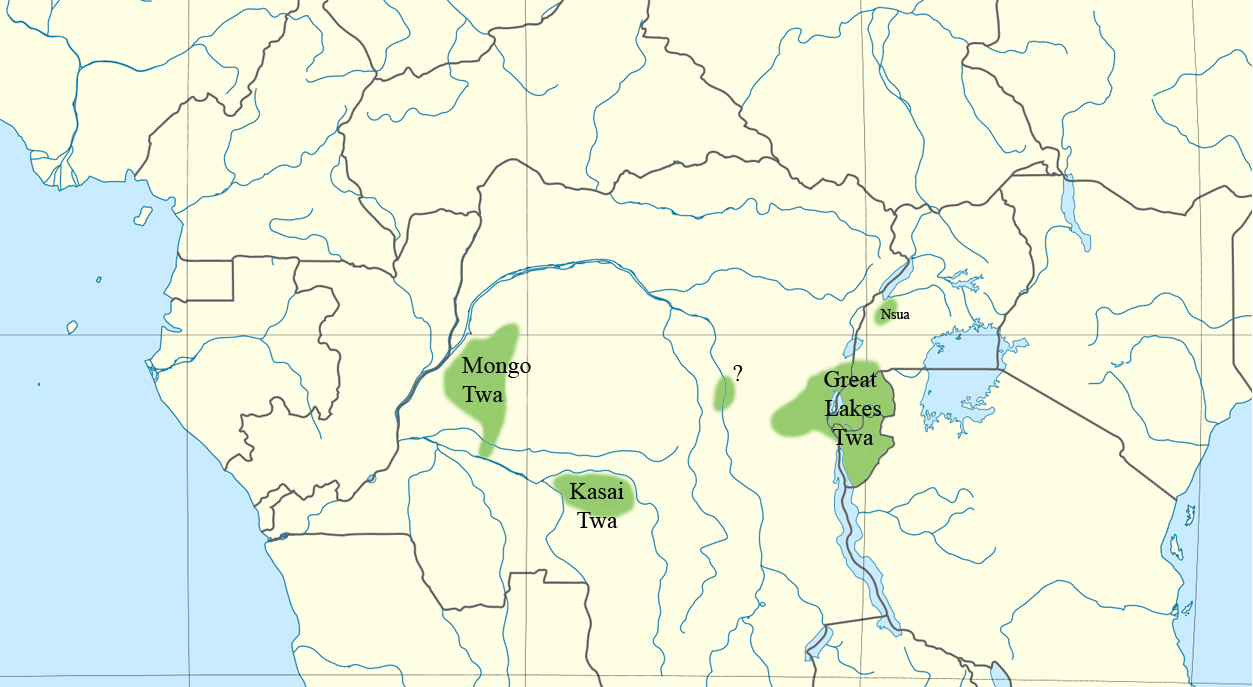
The northern Twa. The easternmost group are the Great Lakes Twa.

- Volcano National Park, Rwanda (resettled, 1970s–1980s)
- Nyungwe Forest, Rwanda (resettled, 1970s–1980s)
- Bwindi Impenetrable National Park, Uganda (evicted 1991)
- Mgahinga National Park, Uganda (evicted 1991)
- Kahuzi-Biega National Park, Congo (evicted 1975, returned 2019)
- Virunga National Park, Democratic Republic of Congo
- Gishwati Forest, Rwanda (evicted for forest plantation and dairy production, then as refugee lands)
- Mfangano Island, Kenya (prehistoric only)

== Language ==
The Great Lakes Twa speak distinct dialects of the Rundi, Kiga and Tembo languages.

== Notable people ==
- Adolphine Muley, Congolese politician and member of National Assembly
- Charles Masabo, Burundian politician and senator for Kirundo Province (2010–2015)
- Imelde Sabushimike, Burundian politician and current minister of Human Rights, Social Affairs and Gender
- Vital Bambanze, Burundian politician and senator for Kirundo Province (2010–2015)

== See also ==
- Abatwa
- Twa peoples

=== Other pygmy groups ===
- Mbuti (Bambuti)
- Baka
- Aka

=== Researchers who studied pygmy culture and music ===
- Colin Turnbull
- Simha Arom
- Jean-Pierre Hallet
