= Gihinga Refugee Camp =

Refugee camp in Burundi

Coordinates: 3.4963°S 29.7165°E

Gihinga Refugee Camp is a refugee camp found in Burundi.

== Location ==
Gihinga refugee camp is located in Gihinga colline, Kayokwe commune, Mwaro province in Central Burundi, 50 km from Bujumbura.

== Background ==
Gihinga refugee camp was founded on 23 September 2004 to house refugees from the Democratic Republic of Congo, because of the August 2004 massacre at Gatumba camp. The camp occupies 60 hectares of land with a capacity to accommodate 9,000 refugees. It has 8 blocks of 288 houses. The camp has Banyamulenge, Babembe and Bafulero ethnic groups. The camp is managed by the government of Burundi and the United Nation High Commissioner for Refugees.

== Demography ==
As October 2009, Gihinga refugee camp hosted 23,000 refugees from Democratic Republic of Congo compared to 1,910 refugees who were reported in 2005.

== Services ==
By 2005, these are the partner organizations who support the camp with several services.

Partner organizations	Services provided
Norwegian Refugee Council (NRC)	Camp management, income generating activities education, and protection
International Medical Corps	health
Trans-cultural Psychological Organization (TPO)	health and physical wellbeing

== See also ==
- Bwagiriza Refugee camp

== External sources ==
WFP/UNHCR REPORT OF THE JOINT ASSESSMENT MISSION OF THE CONGOLESE REFUGEES IN BURUNDI 27-30 JUNE 2005
