= Pascal Musoro =

Senator for Kirundo Province
- In office 2005–2010
- Succeeded by: Emmanuel Ndemeye

Pascal Musoro is a politician from Burundi who was Hutu Senator for Kirundo Province from 2005 to 2010.

== Career ==
Members of the Senate of Burundi were indirectly elected on 29 July 2005 by an electoral college of commune and provincial councils. Pascal Musoro was elected Hutu Senator for Kirundo Province on the National Council for the Defense of Democracy – Forces for the Defense of Democracy (CNDD-FDD) platform. The other senators for Kirundo were Philippe Rivuzumwami, Tutsi, also elected on the CNDD-FDD platform, and Charles Masabo, who was coopted as a Twa senator.

On 5 June 2007 it was reported that four CNDD-FDD parliamentarians from Kirundo had just officially left the party. Three were deputies: Mukeragabiro, Xavier Nsababandi and Gérard Nkunzimana, and the fourth was Pascal Musoro.

The CNDD-FDD senate candidates for Kirundo in 2010 were Emmanuel Ndemeye Jenipher Kankindi, Médiatrice Kankuyo and Jean de Dieu Gashamura. The first two were elected on 28 July 2010.

== Sources ==
- Arret No RCCB 148 (PDF) (in French), Constitutional Court of Burundi, 8 August 2005
- Arret RCCB 240 rendu par la cour constitutionnelle du Burundi portant sur la regularite des elections senatoriales du 28 juillet 2010 et la proclamation des resultats definitifs (PDF) (in French), cour constitutionnelle du Burundi
- Burundi (06/09), U.S. State Department
- "Burundi: Les Sénatoriales du 28 juillet 2010 s'annoncent …", AGnews (in French), 26 July 2010
- "Burundi: L'hémorragie au sein du CNDD-FDD", Burundi Réalités (in French), 5 June 2007
