= Democratic Republic of the Congo–Rwanda relations =

Bilateral relations

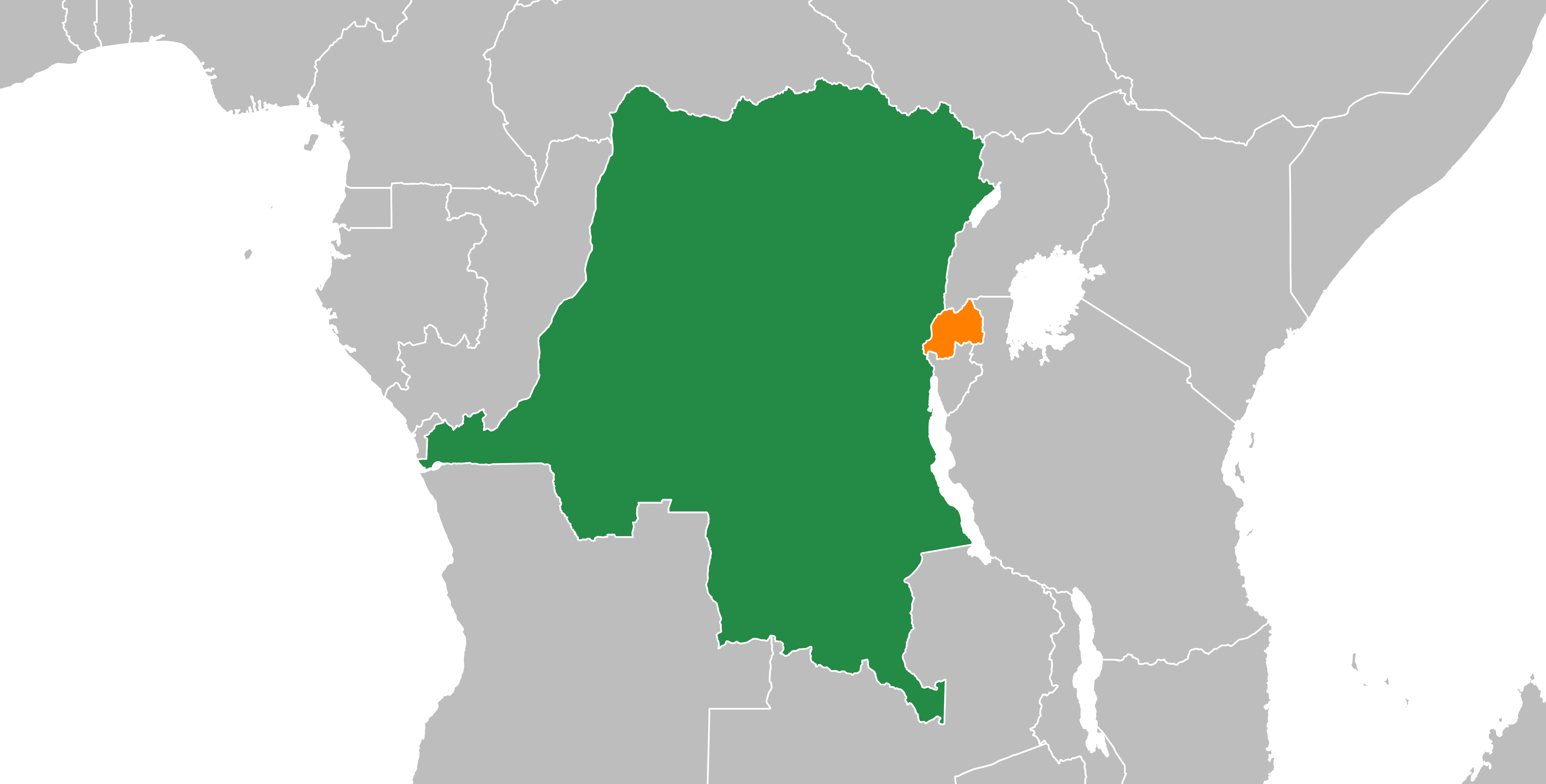
- DR Congo: Rwanda

Diplomatic mission
- Embassy of the Democratic Republic of the Congo, Kigali: Embassy of Rwanda, Kinshasa

Modern relations between the Democratic Republic of the Congo and Rwanda have origins that date back to the European colonial era. Sharing a border that is 221 km (137.32 mi) in length, the two countries were both colonial possessions of Belgium between 1919 and 1960, and were impacted by the two world wars. Both Rwanda and the Congo experienced violent upheavals during their first years of independence, with the Congo (named Zaire from 1971 to 1997) being left with a weak central authority, and Rwanda dealing with periodic raids and incursions from expelled Tutsi rebels in the east of the Congo.

In the aftermath of the Rwandan Civil War, and especially the Rwandan genocide, millions of Hutu fled into Zaire, prompting Rwanda and a coalition of allied countries to launch an offensive in 1996. Both the First and Second Congo Wars (which heavily involved Rwanda) devastated the DRC, the damage of which continued to impact the country into the early 21st century. This history of conflict remains a source of tension and distrust between the two states. Since the 2010s, the DRC has accused Rwanda of supporting the M23 movement in the Kivu region, which Rwanda denies. In January 2025, the DRC severed diplomatic ties with Rwanda amidst the M23 campaign.

== Early relations (before 1959) ==
=== Colonisation ===
From the 1850s to 1890s, the Kingdom of Rwanda reached its greatest territorial extent during the reign of King Kigeli IV Rwabugiri. During this period, the lands constituting what would eventually become the Congo Free State were placed under the sole, private ownership of King Leopold II of Belgium at the Berlin Conference in 1885. Rwanda itself became the site of competing territorial claims between Leopold and the German Empire, with Germany eventually consolidating the kingdom into German East Africa. Rwabugiri unexpectedly died during an expedition in the Congo; the succession crisis that followed, combined with battles against the Congo's Force Publique, weakened Rwanda, and led King Yuhi V Musinga to support indirect German rule of the country. Due to the intense international criticism of the atrocities committed in the Leopold-owned Congo, Belgium would later annex the colony outright in 1908.

=== Colonial period ===
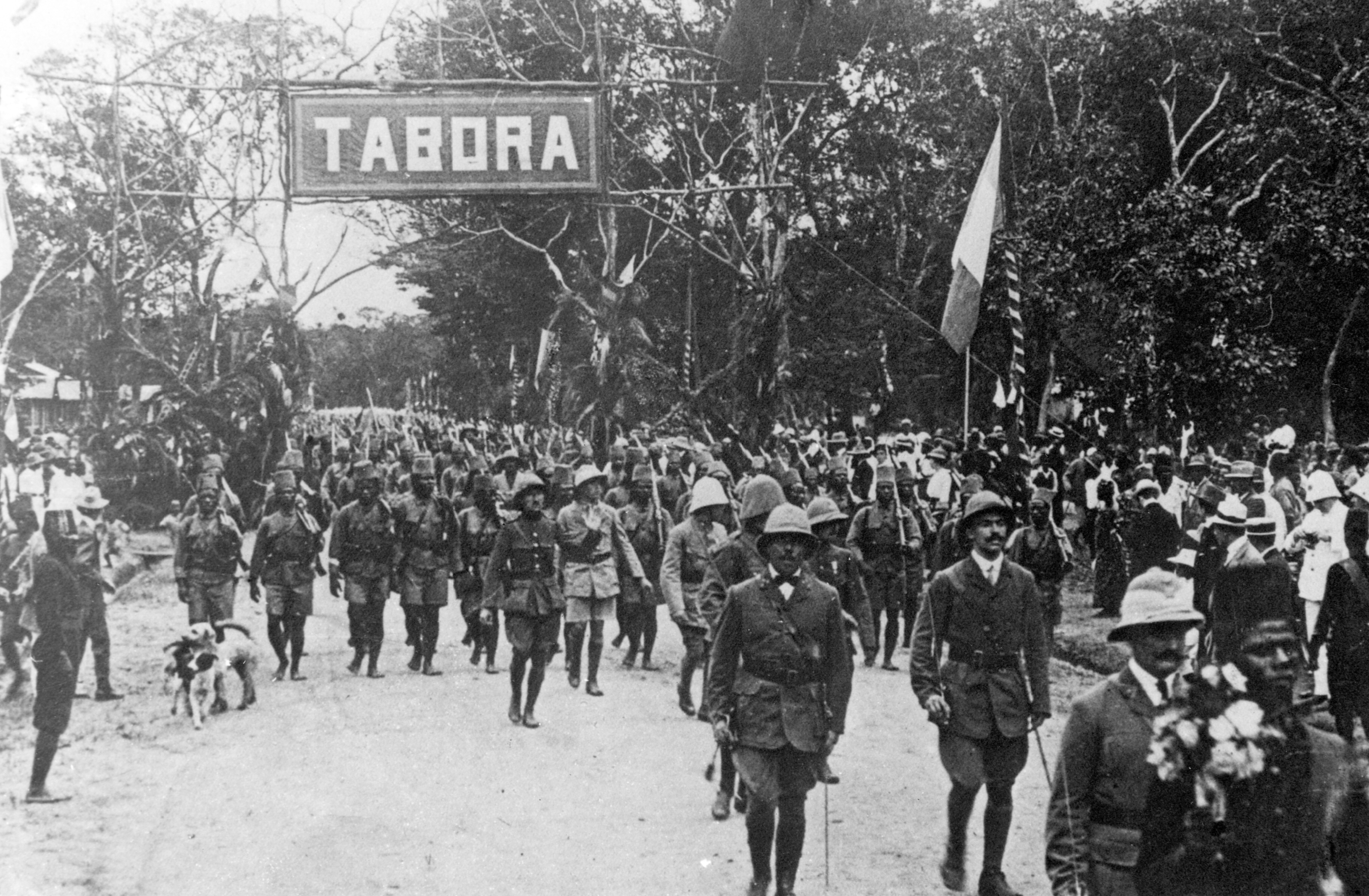
Force Publique in German East Africa after the Battle of Tabora, 1916

During World War I, an initial stand-off between the Belgian Congo's Force Publique and the German colonial army in German East Africa turned into open warfare, with a joint Anglo-Belgian invasion of the territory in 1916 and 1917 during the East African campaign. In 1916, the Belgians had assembled an army of 15,000 men (supported by roughly 260,000 local bearers), taking Kigali on 6 May and Tabora on 19 September. By 1917, the Force Publique controlled one-third of German East Africa. After the war, as outlined in the Treaty of Versailles, Germany was forced to cede control of the westernmost part of the colony to Belgium. On 20 October 1924, Ruanda-Urundi (modern-day Rwanda and Burundi) became a Belgian League of Nations mandate territory, with Usumbura as its capital.

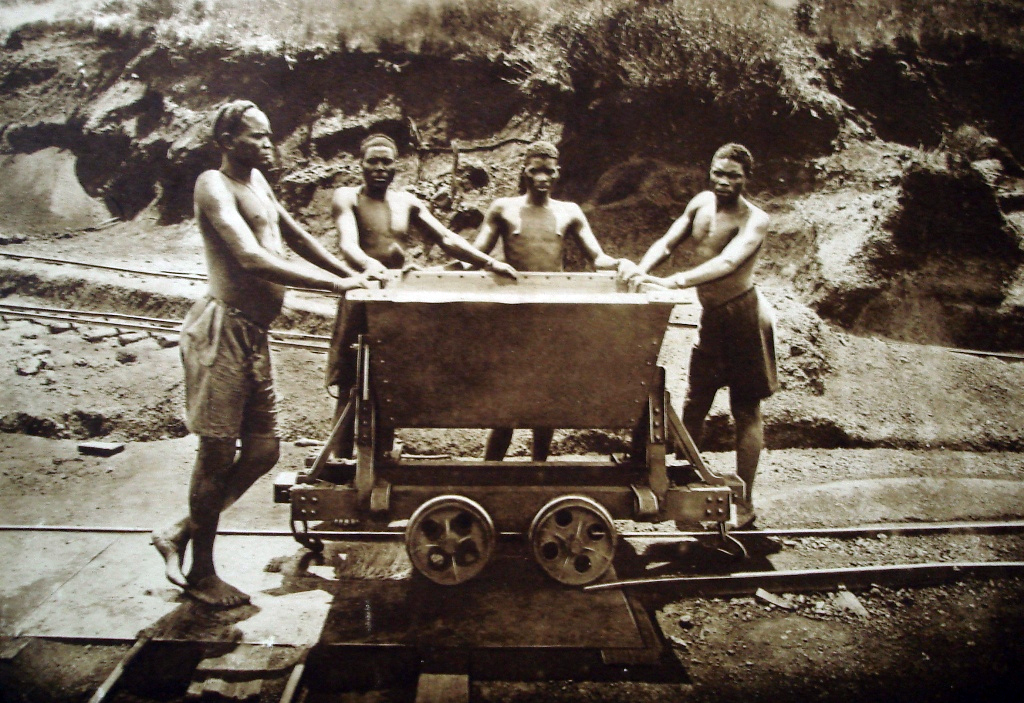
Rwandan workers at a copper mine in Katanga, Belgian Congo c. 1928

In the 1930s, the Belgian colonial administration established a system of encouraging immigration from Ruanda-Urundi to the eastern Congo, both to mitigate population density in the former and provide agricultural labour to the latter. Over 25,000 Rwandans moved to the Masisi Territory between 1937 and 1945, later joined by about 60,000 immigrants between 1949 and 1955. Most of the immigrants were ethnically Hutu, but the number included Tutsi pastoralists. Thousands of people from Ruanda-Urundi also migrated to work in the growing mining industries of Kivu and Katanga during the 1920s to early 1940s. However, because of the poor working conditions of these mines, many Rwandans and Burundians saw either the Tanganyika Territory or the Protectorate of Uganda as preferable places to work, despite Belgian companies attempting to direct them to the Congo.

Both colonies were impacted by World War II; the role of the Congo, and especially its abundance of raw materials, became of interest to the Allies after a German invasion forced the Belgian government into exile in 1940. The Congo's Force Publique also participated in the 1940–1941 campaign against Italian East Africa. In Ruanda-Urundi, a famine devastated the local population in 1943–1944, caused by a combination of drought and the trade policies of colonial authorities, which prioritized sending agricultural products to the Congo for the Allied war effort; as a consequence, between 36,000–50,000 people died, and hundreds of thousands more fled to the Congo or Uganda.

== Cold War (1959–1990) ==
=== Rwandan Revolution (1959–1961) ===
During and after the Rwandan Revolution, around 336,000 Tutsi had fled into the countries surrounding the newly independent Rwanda by 1964, including 60,000 who left for Congo-Léopoldville by 1963. During this period, Tutsi insurgent groups began launching largely unsuccessful attacks against the Hutu-dominated Rwanda, including the December 1963 Bugesera invasion.

Tutsi who emigrated to the Congo before Congolese independence from Belgium in 1960 are known as Banyamulenge, meaning "from Mulenge", and had the right to citizenship under law. Tutsi who emigrated following independence are known as Banyarwanda, although locals often do not distinguish between the two, calling both Banyamulenge, and considering them foreigners.

=== Simba rebellion (1963–1965) ===
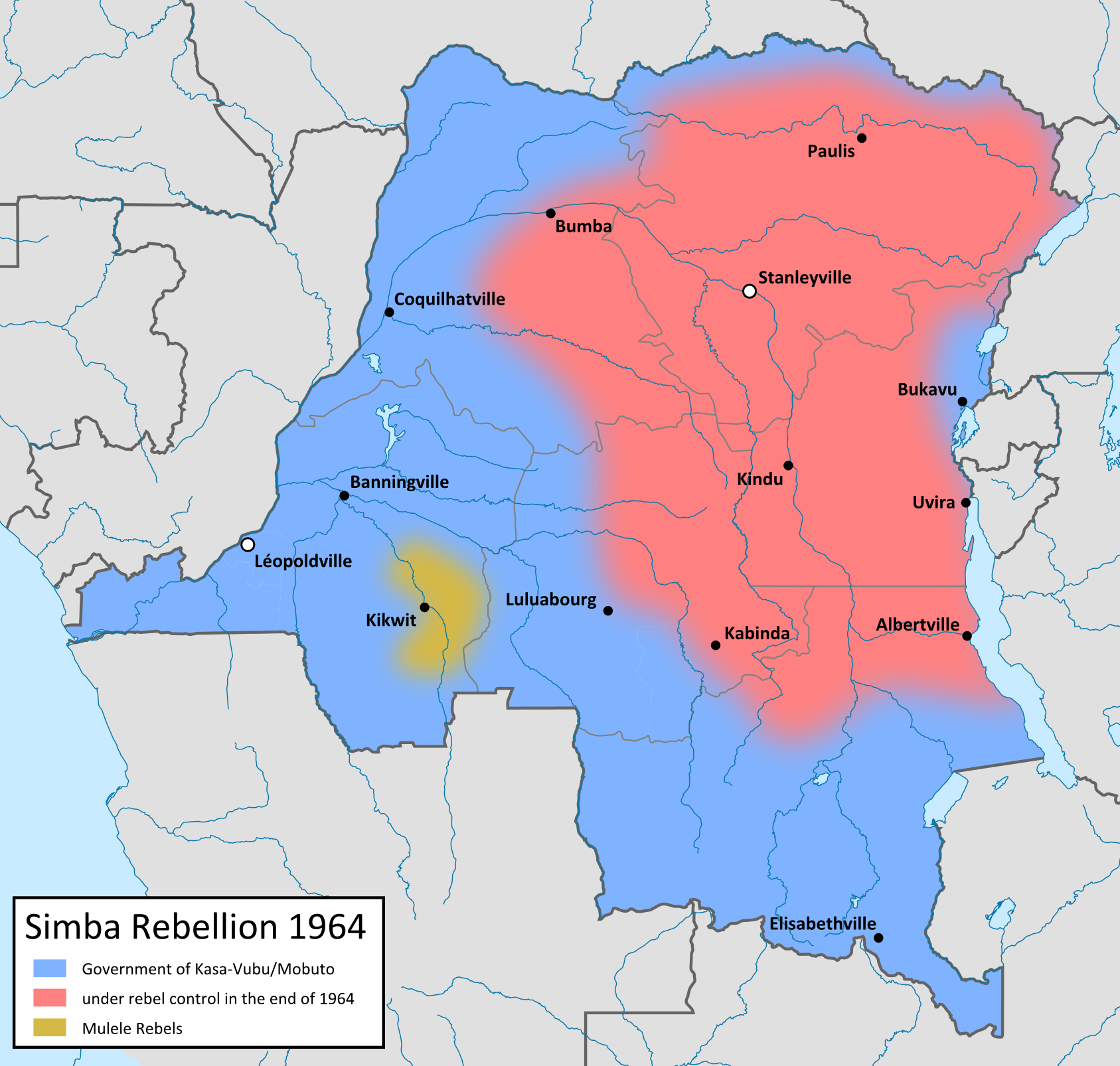
Map showing the Simba rebellion in 1964.

In the midst of the Congo Crisis, mainly Tutsi rebels of the Inyenzi movement reportedly enlisted some defectors of the Armée Nationale Congolaise (ANC; the new name of the Force Publique), and were known to cooperate with pro-Lumumba factions in the Congo in the hopes of achieving future assistance in their insurgency against the Rwandan government. However, the Congolese government was opposed to the radicalisation of the refugees, and tried to curb rebel activity on their soil. Frustrated that Congolese authorities hampered their activities, and radicalised by their repeated failures, Inyenzi rebels based in the Congo joined the Lumumbist Simba rebellion, because they hoped that a Simba-led government would support their own efforts in Rwanda.

Rwandan exiles held prominent positions within the rebel hierarchy, with rebel leader Jerome Katarebe serving as chef de cabinet. After Simba rebels captured Stanleyville (and killed thousands of Westernized Congolese in the process), the Congolese government reacted to the prominent involvement of Rwandan exiles in the rebellion by ordering that all Rwandan refugees were to be expelled from the Congo. Even though the vast majority of Rwandans in the Congo were uninvolved in the uprising and living peacefully, they were consequently the target of ethnic violence and blamed "for all sorts of evil" by Congolese authorities.

Rwandan exiles continued to play an important role for the Simba forces due to the gradual end of other foreign support. The "Rwanadese Popular Movement" and the "Rwanda Youth National Union" led by Jean Kayitare, son of Inyenzi exile leader François Rukeba, each mobilized a battalion to assist the beleaguered Simbas. One Rwandan exile later explained that their continued support for the Simba rebels was mostly motivated by the fact that they were being expelled from other countries such as Burundi, making this "the only choice we had". Despite this, their working relationship with the Congolese insurgents became more strained. The Simba rebels also alienated the Banyamulenge who lived in South Kivu during this time, as the retreating insurgents killed the Banyamulenge's cows for food. Even though they were related to ethnic Rwandans, the Banyamulenge had previously tried to remain neutral and now opted to side with the Congolese government. They organized militias and began to hunt for the rebels.

By April 1965, several thousand pro-Simba Rwandan militants operated in eastern Congo, but their support did little to stem the ANC's advance. One Rwandan rebel leader told Che Guevara that he was losing so many of his fighters that the exiles' plans to invade Rwanda in future had become almost impossible. By the late 1960s, Rwandan exiles no longer played a significant role in guerrilla warfare against the government.

=== Rwanda–Zaire relations (1965–1990) ===
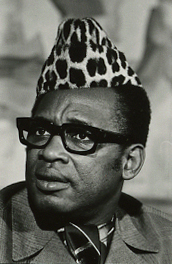
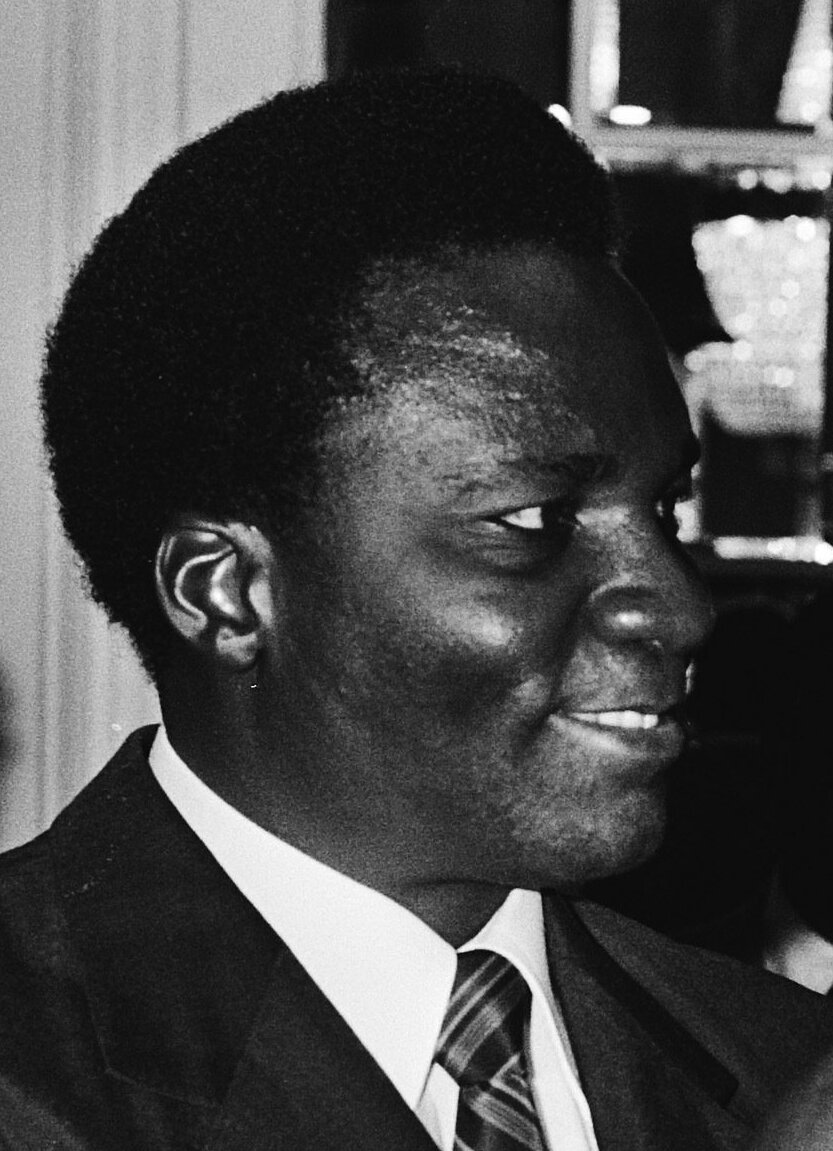
Zairian president Mobutu Sese Seko, 1965–1997 (left); Rwandan president Juvénal Habyarimana, 1973–1994 (right)

Official diplomatic relations between the now independent Rwanda and Congo began in February 1969. After coming to power in the Congo in 1965, President Mobutu Sese Seko (who renamed the country Zaire in 1971) gave the Banyamulenge political power in the east in hopes that they, as a minority, would keep a tight grip on power, and prevent more populous ethnicities from forming an opposition. The "Bakajika Law" of 1966 nationalised all land in the country, and thus the government was able to redistribute it as it wished. This resulted in property in northern Kivu becoming concentrated in the hands of wealthy Tutsi. The Banyarwanda were also formally assured of citizenship by law in 1972. These moves aggravated existing ethnic tensions, as it strengthened the Banyarwanda's hold over important stretches of land in North Kivu that indigenous people claimed as their own. From 1963 to 1966 the Hunde and Nande ethnic groups of North Kivu fought against Rwandan emigrants — both Tutsi and Hutu – in the Kanyarwanda War, which led to several massacres.

Despite a strong Rwandan presence in Mobutu's government, in 1981, the Legislative Council of Zaire adopted a more restrictive stance on citizenship, replacing the old laws with an ordinance guaranteeing citizenship only to those individuals whose ancestors belonged to tribes which has resided in the Congo before 1908. Though never enforced, the law greatly angered individuals of Rwandan descent, and contributed to a rising sense of ethnic hatred.

== Immediate post-Cold War era (1990–2003) ==
=== Rwandan Civil War, genocide and ripple effects (1990–1996) ===
The Rwandan Civil War began in October 1990, after the Rwandan Patriotic Front (RPF), a rebel force of mostly Tutsi Rwandan refugees and expats, launched an attack from across the Rwanda–Uganda border. President Mobutu attempted to provide support to Rwanda by sending hundreds of troops from the elite Special Presidential Division (DSP). However, after Zairian soldiers raped Rwandan civilians in the north of the country and looted their homes, Rwandan President Juvénal Habyarimana expelled them within a week of their arrival. Due to political exclusion and ethnic violence in Zaire, the Banyamulenge developed ties to the RPF as early as 1991.

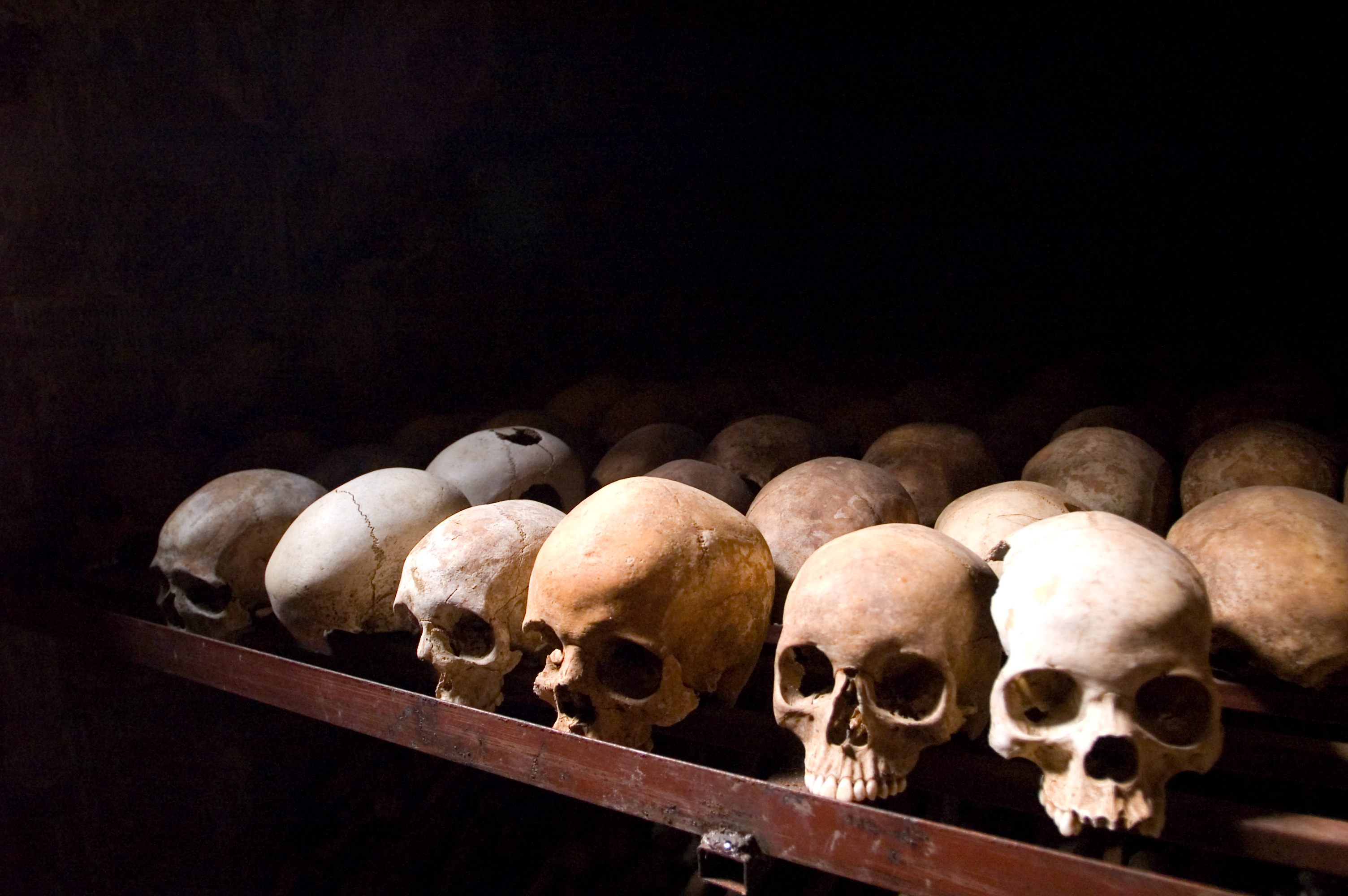
Human skulls at the Nyamata Genocide Memorial Centre in Rwanda

On 6 April 1994, Habyarimana and Burundian president Cyprien Ntaryamira were assassinated after their plane was shot down by surface-to-air missiles, breaking the 1993 peace treaty. Beginning the day after, Hutu extremists carried out a genocide that killed 500,000–800,000 Tutsi, as well as 10,000 Batwa and some moderate Hutu, between 7 April and 15 July 1994. In response to this, the RPF resumed their military campaign, defeating the government and taking complete control of the country on 18 July. This caused around 1.5 million Hutu – including those who perpetrated the genocide – to flee into Zaire, fearing reprisals. Hutu génocidaires soon began to rearm, in a bid to return to power in Rwanda.

From 1993 to 1996 Hunde, Nande, and Nyanga youth regularly attacked Banyamulenge, leading to a total of 14,000 deaths. In 1995, the Zairian Parliament ordered all peoples of Rwandan or Burundian descent to be repatriated to their countries of origin, including the Banyamulenge. However, the Mobutu government was incapable of dealing with the proliferation of rebel groups in the eastern part of the country; decades of corruption from Mobutu had both heavily weakened Zaire as a country and made him very unpopular personally, both at home and abroad. Given the exacerbated ethnic tensions, the lack of government control in the past, and Mobutu's support for the Hutu rebels, Rwanda took action against the security threat posed by génocidaires in eastern Zaire. The RPF-led government in Kigali likely began forming Tutsi militias for operations in Zaire as early as 1995, and chose to act following an exchange of fire between Rwandan Tutsi and Zairian Green Berets that marked the outbreak of a Banyamulenge rebellion on 31 August 1996.

=== Congo Wars (1996–2003) ===
==== First Congo War ====
Map showing the progress made by the AFDL during the First Congo War

Banyamulenge elements and non-Tutsi militias coalesced into the Alliance des Forces Démocratiques pour la Libération du Congo-Zaïre (AFDL) under the leadership of Laurent-Désiré Kabila, a long-time opponent of the Mobutu government and former participant of the Simba rebellion. While the AFDL was an ostensibly Zairian rebel movement, Rwanda had played a key role in its formation. Observers of the First Congo War, as well as the Rwandan Defense Minister and Vice-President at the time, Paul Kagame, claim that the AFDL was formed in, and directed from, Kigali, containing not only Rwandan-trained troops, but also regulars of the Rwandan Patriotic Army (RPA).

Rwanda's primary stated goal was the suppression of génocidaires who had been launching attacks against the new Rwandan state from Zaire. Kagame claimed that Rwandan agents had discovered the plans to invade Rwanda with support from Mobutu; in response, Kigali began its intervention with the intention of dismantling the refugee camps in which the génocidaires often took refuge and destroying the structure of these anti-Rwandan elements. A second goal cited by Kagame was the overthrow of Mobutu. While partially a means to minimize the threat in eastern Zaire, the new Rwandan state also sought to set up a puppet regime in Kinshasa. This goal was not seen as particularly threatening by other states in the region, as many of them also opposed Mobutu.

With the active backing from Rwanda, Uganda and others, the AFDL began to occupy large portions of Zairian territory between October 1996 and May 1997, encountering very little resistance. Rwanda also provided troops and military training to the Banyamulenge, helping them to defeat Zairian security forces. Rwandan forces, the Banyamulenge, and other Zairian Tutsi then attacked the refugee camps, targeting the Hutu militia. These attacks caused hundreds of thousands of refugees to flee; those that fled further into Zaire were relentlessly pursued by the RPA under the cover of the war, and 232,000 Hutu refugees were killed, according to one estimate. By the end of the war, Mobutu was overthrown, and Kabila became the new president of the country on 17 May 1997.

==== Second Congo War ====
When Kabila gained control of the capital in May 1997, he faced substantial obstacles to governing the country, which he renamed the Democratic Republic of the Congo (DRC). Kagame and the Rwandan government retained strong influence over Kabila following his inauguration, and the RPA maintained a heavy presence in Kinshasa. Congolese in the capital resented this, who began to see Kabila as a pawn of foreign powers, (Note: For example, in October 1997, the organization Bureau d'Études, de Recherches, et de Consulting International (BERCI) asked whether respondents thought that Kabila was under "foreign influence". The poll showed that 71% of respondents agreed with the question; in addition, 62% of respondents thought that Rwanda and Uganda were in the process of "recolonizing the Congo".) as did many in the eastern Kivu provinces, where ethnic clashes increased sharply. Tensions reached new heights on 14 July 1998, when Kabila dismissed his Rwandan chief of staff James Kabarebe, and replaced him with a native Congolese, Célestin Kifwa. In late July, Kabila ordered all Rwandan and Ugandan military forces to leave the country. These actions angered many in the Rwandan government, as it posed a threat to their influence in the Congo as well as the safety of the Tutsi in both the DRC and Rwanda. Concerned of these outcomes for months, Kagame began drawing up plans for a second military intervention in the Congo in April 1998.

Countries participating in the Second Congo War

The Second Congo War initially began 2 August 1998 with a Banyamulenge rebellion in Goma, followed by Rwanda backing rebels from the Rally for Congolese Democracy (RCD). In the early stages of the conflict, Kabila enlisted the help of Hutu refugees to combat Rwandan-allied forces, and began to agitate public opinion against the Tutsi, resulting in several public lynchings in the streets of Kinshasa. By the end of 1998, the war escalated into a multisided, continentwide conflict. Various peace meetings were held, culminating in the July 1999 Lusaka Ceasefire Agreement which was signed by the DRC, Rwanda and all the other foreign governments. The rebel groups were not party to the agreement, and fighting continued. The RPA was still heavily involved in the DRC during 2000, fighting battles against the Ugandan army in Kisangani, and against Kabila's army in Kasai and Katanga.

Although the primary reason for Rwanda's involvement in the two Congo wars was security, Kagame was alleged to gain economic benefit by exploiting the mineral wealth of the eastern Congo. In April 2001, a United Nations panel of experts investigated the illegal exploitation of diamonds, cobalt, coltan, gold and other lucrative resources in the Congo. The report accused Rwanda, alongside Uganda and Zimbabwe, of systematically exploiting Congolese resources and recommended the Security Council impose sanctions.

In January 2001, Kabila was assassinated inside his palace. His son, Joseph, was appointed president and immediately began asserting his authority by dismissing his father's cabinet and senior army commanders, assembling a new government, and engaging with the international community. The new government provided impetus for renewed peace negotiations, and in July 2002, a peace agreement was reached between Rwanda, the DRC, and the other major participants, in which all foreign troops would withdraw, and RCD-Goma would enter a power-sharing transitional government with Joseph Kabila as interim president until elections could be held. Kagame's government announced at the end of 2002 that all uniformed Rwandan troops had left Congolese territory, but this was contradicted by a 2003 report by UN panel of experts. According to this report, the Rwandan army contained a dedicated "Congo desk", which used the armed forces for large-scale illegal appropriation of Congolese resources.

== Modern relations (2003–present) ==
Despite the agreement and subsequent ceasefire, relations between the DRC and Rwanda remained tense. Kagame blamed the DRC for failing to suppress the Democratic Forces for the Liberation of Rwanda (FDLR), a rebel group led by Rwandan Hutu operating in North and South Kivu. In turn, Joseph Kabila accused Rwanda of using the Hutu as a "pretext for maintaining its control and influence in the area". Since 2003, Rwanda and the DRC have both cooperated with, and fought against, each other during military operations on Congolese territory.

In July 2009, the DRC and Rwanda appointed ambassadors between each others countries. In August that year, Kabila and Kagame met with each other in Goma, marking the first presidential meeting between the two countries since 1996. Kabila considered it a positive development, while Kagame promised that "Rwanda would never be a base [of operations] for militias that could destabilise Congo."

=== Kivu and the March 23 Movement ===
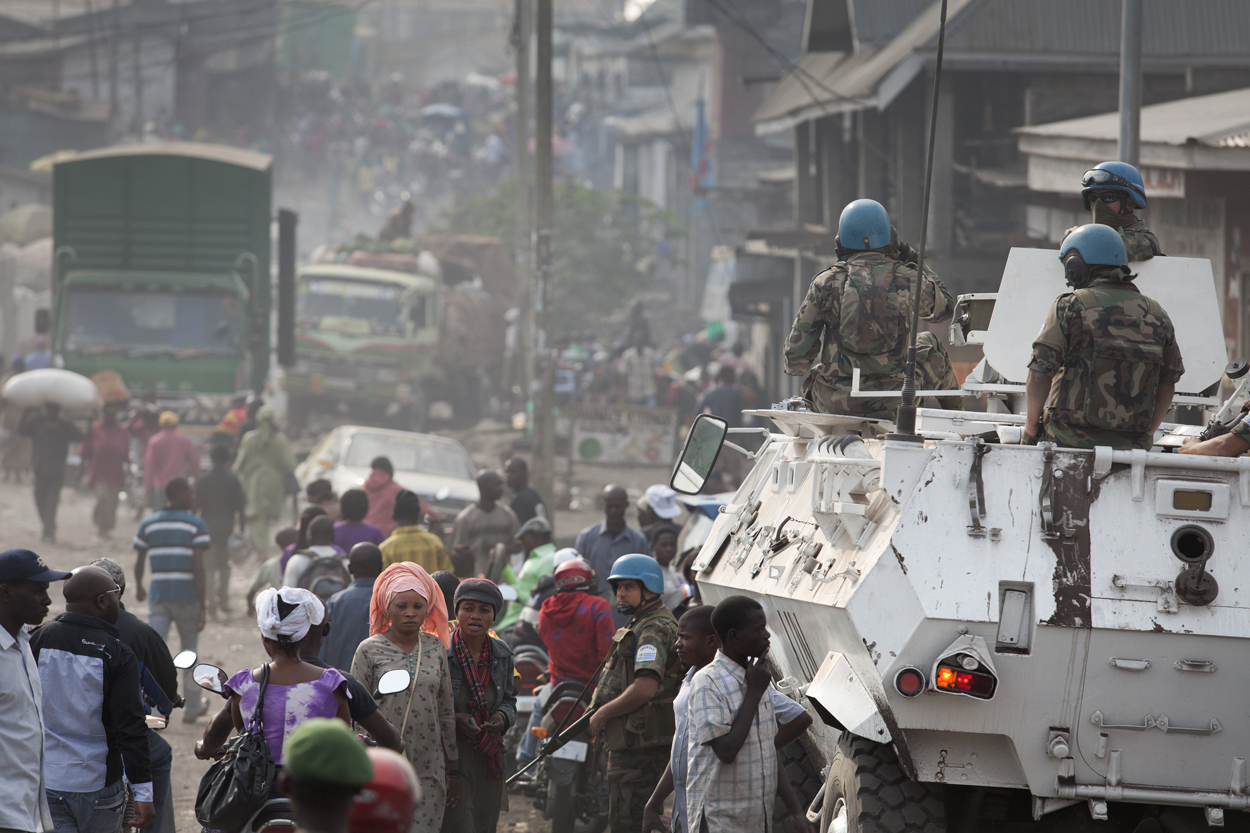
MONUSCO forces and refugees in Goma, DRC during the M23 rebellion.

There has been ongoing conflict in the DRC's eastern provinces since 2004, during which Rwanda has backed two major insurgencies. This included a major rebellion from 2005 to 2009, led by Congolese Tutsi Laurent Nkunda, as well as the a rebellion carried out by the March 23 Movement (M23) under leader Bosco Ntaganda in 2012–2013. A leaked United Nations report in 2012 cited Kagame's defence minister James Kabarebe as being effectively the commander of the M23. Although they were defeated in 2013, M23 fighters who fled to Rwanda and Uganda started crossing back into the DRC during a rising crisis over Kabila extending his term limit.

After Félix Tshisekedi was sworn into office as Kabila's successor in January 2019, he initially had a friendly relationship with Kagame, with the countries appearing to move towards normalizing relations. However, this initial friendliness changed after the M23 launched another offensive in North Kivu on 27 March 2022. Tensions between Rwanda and the DRC escalated, with Tshisekedi accusing Rwanda of launching an "invasion" of his country via the M23, which Kagame denied. International observers, UN experts and independent researchers generally agreed that Rwanda was directly involved in the M23 conflict.

Due to Rwanda's support for M23, the DRC severed diplomatic ties between the two countries on 26 January 2025.

On 17 February 2025, the Rwandan-backed M23 rebels were reported to have seized Bukavu, and vowed to restore security amid all of the war in the rising.

On June 19, 2025, both countries agreed to a draft peace agreement to end the fighting. On June 27, Congolese Foreign Minister Theresa Kaykwamba and her Rwandan counterpart, Olivier Ndohongira, signed a peace agreement in the presence of US Secretary of State Marco Rubio in Washington D.C. However, the agreement, which was signed on December 4 2025, failed to end the conflict between the Democratic Republic of the Congo and the Rwanda-backed M23. On December 8, 2025, Tshisekedi publicly accused Rwanda of violating the agreement.

=== Mpox Crisis ===
In February 2025, the ongoing conflict in eastern Democratic Republic of Congo led to over 500 mpox patients fleeing clinics in Goma and Bukavu, following attacks by Rwanda-backed M23 rebels. Health officials warn of increased transmission risks as missing patients remain unaccounted for. The disease, which caused 900 deaths in DR Congo during 2024, saw nearly 2,890 cases and 180 fatalities reported between January and March. Looting at health centers, including the Mugunga facility in Goma, has worsened the crisis, with medical records destroyed and essential supplies stolen. The Africa CDC has called for a ceasefire and a humanitarian corridor to sustain mpox interventions. A new, potentially more transmissible mpox variant has also been detected, further straining the country’s response amid ongoing conflict and funding shortages.

== Border ==
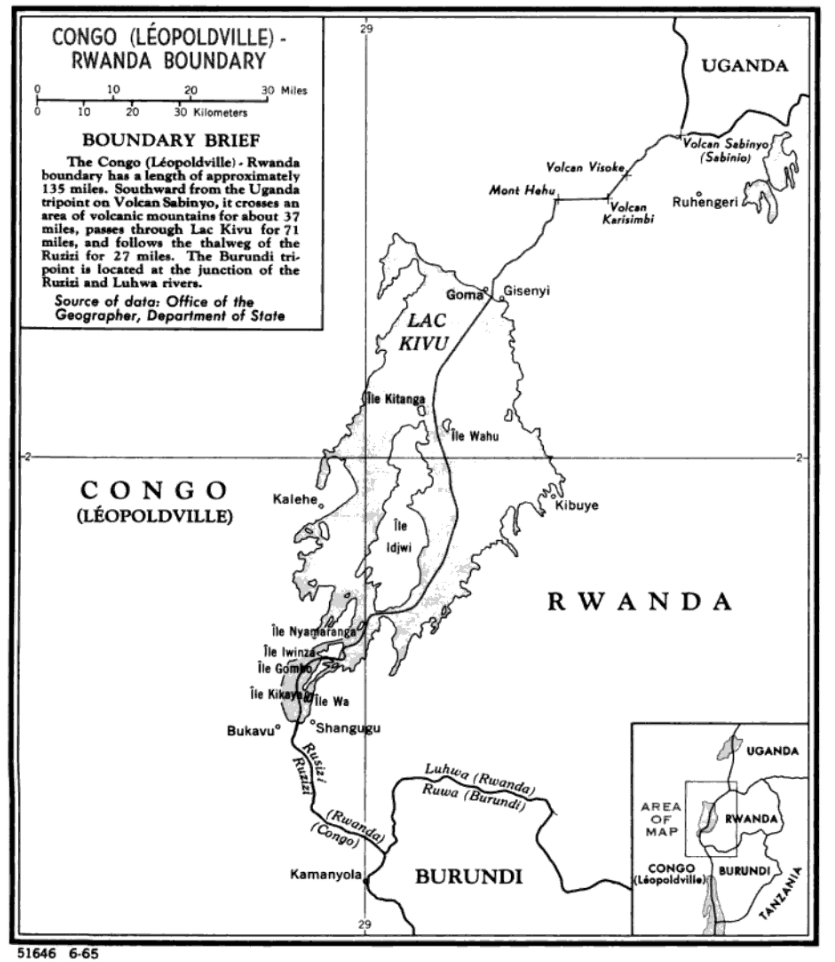
Border map from 1965

Crossing Lake Kivu in its entirety through the Virunga Mountains down to Mount Karisimbi, the DRC–Rwanda border is 221 kilometres (137.32 miles) long, dividing the cities of Goma/Gisenyi and Bukavu/Cyangugu. Despite the de jure border being created after the Berlin Conference in 1884–85, this boundary would not be properly delineated until 1910, at a joint conference between Belgium, Germany and the United Kingdom.

There was a brief border clash between Rwanda and the DRC in 2012, which resulted in a few soldiers being killed. Alleged cross-border rocket attacks had also occurred in 2022, during a period of heightened tensions between the two countries.

== See also ==
- Foreign relations of the Democratic Republic of the Congo
- Foreign relations of Rwanda
