= Kody =

Belgian television host, comedian, and radio personality

- Born: Kody Seti Kimbulu; 23 January 1978 (age 48); Schaerbeek, Belgium
- Education: Université catholique de Louvain

Comedy career
- Medium: Stand-up; television; radio
- Website: www.kody-officiel.com/

Kody Seti Kimbulu (born 23 January 1978), known professionally as Kody or Kody Kim, is a Belgian television host, comedian, and radio personality.

Kody was born in Schaerbeek, Belgium to a Congolese family. He attended the Catholic University of Louvain, studying both politics and business management. After graduation, he joined the theatre group Kings of Comedy and began working in the radio industry, hosting radio shows on VivaCité and RTBF. In 2014, he was featured in the fourth season of Laurent Ruquier's show On n'demande qu'à en rire on France 2.

He was a guest host for La Deux and C8 from 2015 to 2017. On 18 October 2019, it was announced that Kody would host the 10th Magritte Awards.

Kody is the son of Jean-Pierre Kimbulu Moyanso wa Lokwa, ambassador of Zaire to Belgium from 1989 to 1997.
