= Jean-Marie Muhirwa =

Senator for Kirundo Province, Burundi
- In office 2015 – 11 August 2016
- Preceded by: Emmanuel Ndemeye
- Succeeded by: Dévote Faida

Burundi Representative, East African Legislative Assembly
- In office 21 October 2016 – 18 December 2022
- Preceded by: Hafsa Mossi
- Succeeded by: Anastase Manirambona

Jean-Marie Muhirwa is a politician who was elected senator for Kirundo Province, Burundi in 2015. He resigned in 2016 to become a member of the East African Legislative Assembly (EALA).

== Career ==
=== Early years ===
Jean Marie Muhirwa was born in Burundi, and belongs to the Hutu ethnic group. He studied and lived in Kenya, and also spent time in Tanzania. From 1994 he was a member of the ruling party, CNDD-FDD. He became Administrator of the Bwambarangwe Commune of Kirundo, a province in the north of Burundi. He was elected to the Senate of Burundi in 2015.

=== EALA representative ===
On 13 July 2016 Hafsa Mossi, Burundi representative in the East African Legislative Assembly (EALA), was assassinated in Bujumbura. Jean Marie Muhirwa was elected to replace her in the EALA, gaining 103 out of the 109 votes cast in the Burundi National Assembly. His tenure would end in June 2017. On 11 August 2016 the Constitutional Court of Burundi declared that Muhirwa's senate seat was vacant due to his resignation.

Muhirwa was reelected for the 4th Assembly of the EALA to serve from 18 December 2017 to 18 December 2022. Due to growing tensions between Burundi and Rwanda, in March 2017 the five Burundi MPs were visibly absent when President Paul Kagame of Rwanda addressed the EALA session in Kigali. In January they had warned the EALA speaker they would not attend because they were concerned about their safety in Kigali. The Burundi government had accused Rwanda of supporting armed groups who were planning to overthrow the government of President Pierre Nkurunziza. In June 2020 Muhirwa was elected by the EALA as one of the two commissioners for Burundi, replacing Leontine Nzeyimana, to serve in the Assembly for the next two and a half years. In October 2022 the National Assembly of Burundi elected Anastase Manirambona, national secretary of the CNDD-FDD, to replace Murirwa, who had recently resigned as MP of the EALA.

=== Later career ===
In February 2024 Muhirwa was National Secretary of the CNDD FDD party in charge of political and legal issues, and also godfather of Mwaro Province. He participated in a ceremony in the Nyamiyaga colline in the Commune of Rusaka to launch construction of a classroom.

== Sources ==
- Arret RCCB 329 du 08/11/2016 (PDF), Le Cour Constitutionelle, 11 August 2016
- "Burundi members snub Eala as Kagame plays down feud", The Citizen (Tanzania), 7 March 2017
- EALA elects Commissioners for new term, East African Legislative Assembly, 24 June 2020
- EALA Swears in Two New Members, EALA, 22 October 2016
- Hakizimana, Claude (27 October 2022), "Plénière à l'Assemblée nationale : Anastase Manirambona, nouveau député de l'Eala approuvé en remplacement de Jean Marie Muhirwa", Le Renouveau (in French)
- Les autorités de la province Mwaro appelés à travailler en complémentarité, Agence Burundaise de Presse, 18 February 2023
- Muhirwa, Jean-Marie, East African Legislative Assembly
- Uwimana, Diane (19 October 2016), "Jean Marie Muhirwa Replaces Hafsa Mossi in EALA", IWACU English News
