= Adolphine Muley =

Congolese Twa politician and activist

Member of National Assembly
- In office 13 February 2019 – 2024
- Constituency: Kalehe

Personal details
- Born: 5 July 1970 Bunyakiri, South Kivu, or Kitchanga, North Kivu, Democratic Republic of the Congo
- Party: PPRD
- Occupation: Politician

Adolphine Byayuwa Muley (born 5 July 1970) is a Congolese Twa politician and activist who served as a member of the National Assembly from 2019 to 2024.

== Early life ==
Muley was born in Bunyakiri or Kitchanga on 5 July 1970. She established the empowerment organization for the Twa community, Union pour l’émancipation de la femme autochtone (UEFA) in 1998 and became the secretary general in 2000. As the head of the organization, she participated in several international forums about indigenous people and lobbied the indigenous women's rights cause at the provincial, national, and international levels. In 2003, she raised the issue of Pygmy genocide at the UN forum.

== Political career ==
In 2006, Muley took part in the provincial elections as an independent candidate, and she lost the election despite receiving 9000 votes. She then joined PPRD and participated in the 2011 election as a parliament candidate. Nevertheless, she did not win the election.

Marcellin Cishambo reshuffled his cabinet on 5 June 2013 and appointed Muley as the Ministry of Environment and Agriculture of South Kivu. She ran for the 2018 Democratic Republic of the Congo general election as a candidate representing Kalehe and won a seat. She was the only indigenous people in the parliament. In the 2023 Democratic Republic of the Congo general election, she lost a seat at the National Assembly.
