= Hafsa Mossi =

Burundian politician and journalist

Minister of Communications and government spokesperson
- In office 2005–2007

Minister of Regional Integration
- In office 2009–2011

Burundi Representative, East African Legislative Assembly
- In office 12 June 2012 – 13 July 2016
- Succeeded by: Jean-Marie Muhirwa

Personal details
- Born: 1964 Makamba Province
- Died: 13 July 2016 (aged 51–52) Bujumbura
- Manner of death: Assassination

Hafsa Mossi (1964 – 13 July 2016) was a Burundian politician, journalist, and member of President Pierre Nkurunziza's ruling CNDD–FDD political party. Mossi served as Minister of Information, Communications and Government Spokesperson from 2005 to 2007, as well as Minister of Regional Integration from 2009 to 2011, in Nkurunziza's Council of Ministers. She then served as a member of the East African Legislative Assembly (EALA), representing Burundi, from 12 June 2012 until her assassination in 2016. Her current term in the EALA would have expired in 2017.

== Biography ==
Mossi was born in 1964 in Makamba. An ethnic Hutu, she began her career in journalism at the Channel for Africa in South Africa. In 1998, Mossi moved to London and became a journalist and producer for the British Broadcasting Corporation's (BBC) Swahili service. She returned to Burundi in mid-2000s.

== Death ==
On July 13, 2016, Mossi was gunned down while leaving her home in the Gihosha commune of the then-capital, Bujumbura by two gunmen who escaped in a car. President Pierre Nkurunziza called her murder an assassination. Several high-ranking members of the Military of Burundi had been killed in the country since the beginning of the Burundian unrest in April 2015. However, Mossi was the first senior politician to be killed during the ongoing political crisis. Observers were puzzled by the motive behind Mossi's murder, since she was not viewed as a CNDD–FDD hardliner or stalwart.
