= Jean Bosco Ntunzwenimana =

Senator for Kirundo Province, Burundi
- Incumbent
- Assumed office 2020
- Preceded by: Jenifer Kankindi

Jean Bosco Ntunzwenimana is a politician who served as minister of transport in Burundi, then was elected senator for the Kirundo Province, Burundi in 2020.

== Background ==
Ntunzwenimana was born in 1972. He is an engineer by profession.

== Minister ==
On 25 August 2015 President Pierre Nkurunziza announced his cabinet, most of whom were hardline members of the National Council for the Defense of Democracy – Forces for the Defense of Democracy (CNDD-FDD). Jean Bosco Ntunzwenimana was appointed minister of transport, Public Works and Equipment. On 10 December 2015 Jean Bosco Ntunzwenimana was named director general of the National Road Fund.

In April 2017 Ntunzwenimana said the Ministry of Transport would suspend a disputed requirement that bicycle taxi riders had to buy number plates. In June 2018 Ntunzwenimana asked for cancellation of a formal notice to beneficiaries of plots granted by the state who had failed to develop them before the deadline. The director general of urban planning had issued these notices incorrectly. In August 2019 Ntunzwenimana urged youth of Kayanza Province to ignore rumours in the run-up to the 2020 elections, whatever their political views.

On 3 April 2020 Ntunzwenimana announced renewal of the suspension of international commercial flights to or from Melchior Ndadaye International Airport to prevent spread of COVID-19. On 7 April 2020 Ntunzwenimana signed a memorandum of understanding on road safety with the Burundi Red Cross. This covered items such as proivision of first aid kits in public vehicles and helping members of the public receive first aid quickly in the event of an accident. In October 2020 it was reported that Ntunzwenimana had met with his counterparts from Tanzania and the Democratic Republic of the Congo in {{Bujumbura|| to discuss construction of a standard gauge railway from Uvinza, Kigoma in Tanzania, via Musongati in Burundi to Kindu in the DRC. The meeting was convened by the executive secretary of the Central Corridor Transit Transport Facilitation Agency (CCTTFA) Secretariat.

== Senator ==
In 2020 Jean Bosco Ntunzwenimana was elected Tutsi Senator for Kirundo Province. In the distribution of senators to standing committees on 1 October 2020, Jean Bosco Ntunzwenimana was a member of the Standing committee on political, diplomatic, defense and security issues.

== Sources ==
- Arret RCCB 395 du 28 Juillet 2020 (PDF), La Cour Constitutionelle, 28 July 2020
- Burundi extends suspension of int'l commercial flights for 2nd time, Xinhua, 4 April 2020
- Burundi: New government list dominated by hardliners from the party in power, Agence Ecofin, 28 August 2015
- Burundi: un ministre lève la mise en demeure illégale des attributaires de parcelles non mises en valeur (in French), xinhuanet, 13 June 2018
- CCTTFA Secretariat Conducts Tri-partite Ministerial Meeting on Uvinza-Musongati-Gitega-Uvira-Kindu SGR Project, Central Corridor Transit Transport Facilitation Agency
- Decret No 100/117 du 10 Decembre 2015 portant nominsation du Directeur General du Fonds Routier National (PDF), 10 December 2015
- Internal instruction no SNB / CP / 074/2020 of 01/10/2020 on distribution of senators in the standing committees, Senate of Burundi
- Jean de Dieu (4 September 2019), Young people of the province are urged to avoid rumors
- Manishatse, Lorraine Josiane (1 April 2024), "Burundi Transport Minister suspends measure to purchase plates for bicycle-taxi riders", IWACU Engoiush news
- Raphaël Bigirimana (7 April 2020), Le Ministère en charge des travaux publics et la Croix Rouge signent un protocole d’accord (in French), Radio Télévision Nationale du Burundi
- Senators list, Senate of the Republic of Burundi
