= Elebe ma Ekonzo =

Congolese diplomat

- Elebe ma Ekonzo, Ambassador of Zaire to Belgium, presenting his credentials to King Baudouin in 1972

Ambassador of the Republic of Zaire in Belgium
- In office 12 December 1972 – 1975
- President: Mobutu Sese Seko

Personal details
- Born: 7 July 1933 or 7 July 1937; Bumba, Belgian Congo
- Died: 16 January 2003; Kinshasa, Democratic Republic of the Congo
- Political party: Popular Movement of the Revolution

Philippe Elebe ma Ekonzo (7 July 1933 or 7 July 1937 – 16 January 2003) was a Congolese diplomat and civil servant.

== Career in the Belgian Congo ==
Elebe ma Ekonzo followed secondary education at Saint Joseph College in Léopoldville, in 1952. The same year, he became a journalist at the Courrier d'Afrique, before founding his own magazine called Le Congo indépendant in Stanleyville in 1959.

== Career in the independent Congo/Zaire ==
At the time of independence, Elebe ma Ekonzo became an adviser in the cabinet of the Minister of Economic Coordination and Planning, Aloïs Kabangi. From 1966 to 1972, he was the Director of the national press agency Agence Zaïre presse (AZAP).

In December 1972, Elebe ma Ekonzo was appointed the Zairean Ambassador to Belgium. On the occasion of the publication of Jules Chomé's anti-Mobutist book L'ascension de Mobutu in Belgium in 1974, Elebe ma Ekonzo was recalled for consultations. Six months later, he was reinstated in Brussels.

From 1975 to 1977, he became the Director of AZAP once again, before being appointed to the Political Bureau of the state party Popular Movement of the Revolution (Mouvement populaire de la révolution, MPR). From 1980 to 1982, he was State Commissioner for National Orientation, Culture, and Arts. Finally, in 1983, he became a member of the powerful MPR organ Central Committee (Comité central).

== Family ==
Philippe Elebe ma Ekonzo is the father of authors: Yolande Elebe Ma Ndembo, Tony Elebe ma Ekonzo, Tiguy Elebe Motingiya, Nick Elebe Ma Elebe.

== Honours ==
- Zaire: National Order of the Leopard (Grand Officer)
- Belgium: Order of the Crown (Grand Cross)
