= Bwagiriza Refugee Camp =

Refugee camp in Burundi

Coordinates: 3.353°S 30.270°E

Bwagiriza Refugee Camp is a refugee camp located in Ruyigi province, eastern part of Burundi. It houses refugees and asylum seekers from the Democratic Republic of Congo.

Bwagiriza refugee camp was established in May 2009 to house the congolese refugees who were formerly occupying Gihinga refugee camp. The camp also has refugees and asylum seekers from Somalia, and Rwanda. It occupies an area of 60 hectares with a capacity of up to 9,000 refugees.

== External Report ==
- Site report 2018 Bwagiriza BURUNDI
