= Jean-Pierre Kimbulu =

Congolese ambassador

Ambassador of Zaire to Belgium
- In office 1989–1997
- President: Mobutu Sese Seko

Personal details
- Born: Jean-Pierre Kimbulu Moyanso wa Lokwa; 1950 Léopoldville, Belgian Congo
- Died: November 15, 2019 Brussels, Belgium
- Political party: Popular Movement of the Revolution

Jean-Pierre Kimbulu Moyanso wa Lokwa (1950 – 2019) was a Congolese politician and diplomat.

== Early life and career ==
Born in the Belgian Congo's capital Léopoldville, Sakombi was a member of the Sakata people. He obtained a degree in translation and interpretation. He started his political and diplomatic career in various ministerial cabinets between 1971 and 1976. Among other positions, he worked as cabinet secretary of foreign affairs in the office of Jean Nguza Karl-i-Bond and private secretary of Minister Inonga Lokonga l'Ome.

== Political and diplomatic career ==
Kimbulu became a diplomat for Zaire in 1976; his first posting was in Brussels. In 1987, he published a Who's Who as reference work for Zairean personalities. In 1988,he became the ambassador of his country to Switzerland, before moving in 1989 to Brussels for his final position as ambassador to Belgium, The Netherlands, Luxembourg and the European Community.

== Family ==
Jean-Pierre Kimbulu Moyanso wa Lokwa is the father of Belgian comedian Kody Seti Kimbulu and Belgian founder of consulting firm Business Congo Consulting, Stéphanie Kimbulu.

== Bibliography ==
- Kimbulu Moyanso wa Lokwa, Jean-Pierre (2017). Persona non grata: Révélations du dernier ambassadeur de Mobutu à Bruxelles (in French). Brussels: Marque belge.
- Kimbulu Moyanso wa Lokwa, Jean-Pierre (1987). Who's who in Zaire : Dictionnaire biographique (in French). Brussels: Éditions New Fashion Media.
