= Philippe Rivuzumwami =

Senator for Kirundo Province
- In office 2005–2010
- Succeeded by: Jenifer Kankindi

Philippe Rivuzumwami is a politician from Burundi who was Tutsi Senator for Kirundo Province from 2005 to 2010.

== Career ==
In a popular referendum on 28 February 2005 the people of Burundi overwhelmingly approved a post-transitional constitution. Senate members were indirectly elected on 29 July 2005 by an electoral college of commune and provincial councils. Philippe Rivuzumwami was elected Tutsi Senator for Kirundo Province on the platform if the National Council for the Defense of Democracy – Forces for the Defense of Democracy (CNDD-FDD). Pascal Musoro was elected Hutu Senator for Kirundo and Charles Masabo was coopted as Twa Senator for Kirundo.

In June–July 2007 Philippe Rivuzumwami was a member of a Senate commission to report on the situation around the border between Burundi and Rwanda, reporting their findings to the senate.

== Sources ==
- Arret No RCCB 148 (PDF) (in French), Constitutional Court of Burundi, 8 August 2005, archived from the original (PDF) on 2024-06-14
- Burundi (06/09), U.S. State Department
- Rapport d’information d’une mission de Sénateurs dans des localités des provinces Kirundo, Muyinga, Ngozi et Cibitoke frontalières entre le Burundi et le Rwanda (PDF) (in French), Senate of Burundi, 2007
