= Ekila Liyonda =

Minister of Foreign Affairs of Zaire
- In office 1987–1988
- President: Mobutu Sese Seko
- Preceded by: Léon Kengo
- Succeeded by: Jean Nguza Karl-i-Bond

Personal details
- Born: 16 October 1948 Leopoldville, Belgian Congo
- Died: 23 June 2006 (aged 57) Brussels, Belgium

Adrienne Ekila Liyonda (16 October 1948 – 23 June 2006) was a Zairean (now DRC) politician who served as ambassador to Belgium and was the country's first female Foreign minister.

== Early life and education ==
Liyonda was born on 16 October 1948 in Leopoldville (now Kinshasa). She attended secondary school at the Lycée Sainte Marie-Theerèse before graduating from the Catholic University of Louvain with a Bachelor of Laws in 1974.

== Career ==
Liyonda worked as a legal advisor to the Zaire Press Agency from 1974 until 1976 and was a member of the Board of directors of Gécamines and of the Permanent Commission for the Reform of Zaire Law. In 1976 she became a legal advisor in the Office of President Mobutu Sese Seko. She was appointed Secretary General of the nationalist unity party Mouvement Populaire de la Revolution in 1981. In 1985, she was appointed Secretary General in charge of Women's Affairs and State Commissioner for Women's Affairs and Social Affairs.

Liyonda was appointed Ambassador to Belgium, the Netherlands and Luxembourg in 1985. She returned to Zaire in 1987 and entered the Mobutu government as Minister of Foreign Affairs, making her the country's first female foreign affairs minister. In this role she was a signatory to the African Charter on Human and Peoples' Rights. In 1988 she became Minister of Information and Press serving until 1990.

During the growing conflict of the 1990s, Liyonda became a member of the Union of Democrats and Independents and was the Federal President for Kinshasa. After the arrival of Laurent-Désiré Kabila and the AFDL in May 1997, she returned to live in Belgium.

Liyonda died in Brussels on 23 June 2006. She was buried in the Gombe cemetery.
