= Commune of Rusaka =

Coordinates: 3°26′33″S 29°37′00″E

- Commune
- Interactive map of Commune of Rusaka
- Country: Burundi
- Province: Mwaro Province
- Administrative center: Mwaro
- Time zone: UTC+2 (Central Africa Time)

The commune of Rusaka is a commune of Mwaro Province in central Burundi. The capital lies at Mwaro (Rusaka).In recent years forest development in this agricultural commune has resulted in arid soils in some parts. In June 2003, FDD combatants killed three civilians and burned local government buildings and a cooperative in the commune.
