= Commune of Bisoro =

Coordinates: 3°40′57″S 29°41′50″E

- Commune
- Interactive map of Commune of Bisoro
- Country: Burundi
- Province: Mwaro Province
- Administrative center: Bisoro
- Time zone: UTC+2 (Central Africa Time)

The commune of Bisoro is a commune of Mwaro Province in central Burundi. The capital lies at the village Bisoro.
