= Commune of Kayokwe =

Coordinates: 3°31′51″S 29°47′21″E

- Commune
- Interactive map of Commune of Kayokwe
- Country: Burundi
- Province: Mwaro Province
- Administrative center: Kayokwe
- Time zone: UTC+2 (Central Africa Time)

The commune of Kayokwe is a commune of Mwaro Province in central Burundi. The capital lies at Kayokwe.
