= List of ambassadors of the Democratic Republic of the Congo to Belgium =

Ambassador of Democratic Republic of the Congo to Belgium
- Incumbent; Christian Ndongala Nkuku since October 22, 2021
- Inaugural holder: Albert Delvaux
- Formation: June 30, 1960

The Congolese ambassador in Belgium is the official representative of the Government in the Democratic Republic of the Congo to the Government of Belgium.

== List of representatives ==
Start	End	Ambassador	Title other than Ambassador	List of heads of state of the Democratic Republic of the Congo	List of Belgian monarchs	Other remarks
June 23, 1960		Albert Delvaux	Resident Minister in Belgium	Joseph Kasa-Vubu	Baudouin of Belgium	
Diplomatic rupture from 14 July 1960 to 27 December 1961
1964	1966	Cyrille Adoula		Mobutu Sese Seko	Baudouin of Belgium	
June 1966		Bernardin Mungul Diaka		Mobutu Sese Seko	Baudouin of Belgium	
December 12, 1972		Elebe ma Ekonzo		Mobutu Sese Seko	Baudouin of Belgium	Recalled for consultations between April and October 1974.
		Inonga Lokonga L'Ome		Mobutu Sese Seko	Baudouin of Belgium	
1979	1982	Léon Kengo wa Dondo		Mobutu Sese Seko	Baudouin of Belgium	
		Albert Constantin Tshibuabua Ashila Pashi		Mobutu Sese Seko	Baudouin of Belgium	
1985	1987	Adrienne Ekila Liyonda		Mobutu Sese Seko	Baudouin of Belgium	
January 22, 1988	1988	Mushobekwa Kalimba wa Katana		Mobutu Sese Seko	Baudouin of Belgium	
1988	February 7, 1989	Kabala Kiseka Seka		Mobutu Sese Seko	Baudouin of Belgium	
February 8, 1989	March 20, 1989	Hamuli Mupenda	Chargé d'affaires a.i.	Mobutu Sese Seko	Baudouin of Belgium	
March 21, 1989	May 17, 1997	Jean-Pierre Kimbulu Moyanso wa Lokwa		Mobutu Sese Seko	Baudouin of Belgium; Albert II of Belgium	
1997	1998	Justine M'Poyo Kasa-Vubu		Laurent-Désiré Kabila	Albert II of Belgium	
1999	2002	Rachel Albert Kisonga Mazakala		Laurent-Désiré Kabila; Joseph Kabila	Albert II of Belgium	
2003	2009	Jean-Pierre Mutamba Tshampanga		Joseph Kabila	Albert II of Belgium	Recalled for consultations in October 2004 after remarks by Belgian Minister for Foreign Affairs Karel De Gucht about president Kabila.
2009	2015	Henri Mova Sakanyi		Joseph Kabila	Albert II of Belgium; Philippe of Belgium	
December 9, 2015	September 2016	Dominique Kilufya Kamfwa		Joseph Kabila	Philippe of Belgium	
2016		Paul-Crispin Kakhozi Bin-Bulongo	Chargé d'affaires a.i.	Joseph Kabila; Félix Tshisekedi	Philippe of Belgium	
October 22, 2021		Christian Ndongala Nkuku		Félix Tshisekedi	Philippe of Belgium	

== See also ==
- Democratic Republic of the Congo–Belgium relations
