= Jenifer Kankindi =

Senator for Kirundo Province, Burundi
- In office 2010–2020
- Preceded by: Philippe Rivuzumwami
- Succeeded by: Jean Bosco Ntunzwenimana

Jenifer Kankindi (Note: Jenifer Kankindi's first name is sometimes given as "Jennifer" or even "Jenipher".) is a politician who was elected Senator for the Kirundo Province, Burundi in 2010, and reelected in 2015.

== Senator ==
In July 2010 Jenifer Kankindi and Emmanuel Ndemeye were elected senators for Kirundo. It was said that neither had attended university. It was also reported that Jean Baptiste Nzigamasabo, alias Gihahe, who headed the list of National Council for the Defense of Democracy – Forces for the Defense of Democracy (CNDD-FDD) candidates for the National Assembly, had not completed primary school.

In July 2015 the senators elected for the Province of Kirundo were Jean-Marie Muhirwa, Hutu, and Jenifer Kankindi, Tutsi. Both were candidates of the CNDD-FDD.

== Later career ==
In 2020 Jean Bosco Ntunzwenimana was elected Tutsi Senator for Kirundo Province. In 2022 Jennifer Kankindi was administrator of the Vumbi commune of Kirundo.

== Sources ==
- Arret RCCB 395 du 28 Juillet 2020 (PDF), La Cour Constitutionelle, 28 July 2020
- Le gouverneur de Kirundo met en garde ceux qui font le commerce illégal des minerais (in French), Agence Burundaise de Presse, 24 January 2022
- "Nouvelles locales du mercredi 28 juillet 2010", Arib News (in French), 29 July 2010
- "Sénatoriales en cours à travers le pays", Radio Isanganiro (in French), 24 July 2015
