= 2012 Congolese–Rwandan border clash =

Congolese-Rwandan border clash
Date	3 November 2012
Location	DRC–Rwanda border
Result	Rwandan victory

Belligerents
Democratic Republic of the Congo	Rwanda

Commanders and leaders
(Democratic Republic of the Congo) Joseph Kabila (Democratic Republic of the Congo) Col. Everest Somo Kakule	(Rwanda) Paul Kagame (Rwanda) Col. Gabriel Ntirandekura

Strength
69th Battalion 70-100	unknown

Casualties and losses
2 DRC soldiers killed	1 RDF soldier killed

The 2012 Congolese–Rwandan border clash was a minor skirmish that occurred along the two countries' border that resulted in the deaths of three soldiers.

== Incident ==
=== DRC claim ===
According to Congolese authorities the incident began 13 km (8 miles) north of Goma, when the Rwanda Defence Force (RDF) had targeted a group of Democratic Republic of the Congo (DRC) soldiers when they refused to stop after being spotted on Rwandan territory, having crossed the frontier to buy beer. Rwandan troops then opened fire killing one DRC soldier, after that Congolese soldiers returned fire and killed an RDF soldier.

=== Rwandan claim ===
According to Rwandan authorities, at about 12pm local time, a contingent of between 70 and 100 DRC soldiers crossed the border illegally to carry out a reconnaissance mission, about 400 meters into Rwandan territory. The local population then called RDF deployment in the area and informed them of Congolese soldiers presence in their village. The DRC troops opened fire first and engaged in a hostile fire-fight. During the shoot-out one DRC soldier was shot dead, during the exchange of fire with RDF who acted solely in self-defense. The intruders were then pushed back towards the Congolese border, leaving the bodies of two DRC soldiers behind. One of the dead soldiers was identified as Corporal Mbanza Numba Bisogolo, who was found with documents which indicated they were on a reconnaissance mission. The soldiers were armed with assault rifles, more than 200 rounds of ammunition, binoculars, communication equipment etc. Rwandan Defense Forces claimed only one of their soldiers was wounded during the incident. Following the shoot-out which Rwanda denounced the incident as an "act of provocation", allowed journalists and military observers to the scene of the shooting, in Busura, near Rubava in the country's west. There an AFP correspondent reported to have seen a Congolese soldier's body at the site.
