= Vital Bambanze =

Burundian politician

Senator for Kirundo Province
- In office 2010–2015
- Preceded by: Charles Masabo

Personal details
- Born: July 21, 1972 (age 53); Shore, Gitobe commune, Kirundo Province, Burundi

Vital Bambanze is a Twa from Kirundo Province, Burundi, who has served as a Senator, and has been involved in various international forums as a representative of the Twa people.

== Early years ==
Vital Bambanze was born on 21 July 1972 in Shore, Commune of Gitobe in Kirundo province, Burundi to a Batwa family. He had three brothers and two sisters. He attended the Kagazo primary school in the commune of Gitobe. In 1989 he passed the national competitive examination, and attended Mukenke High School and Don Bosco (Ngozi) High School. He entered the University of Burundi in 1998. He obtained a degree in African Languages and Literatures. He speaks French, English, Kirundi, Kinyarwanda and Kishwahili.

== Career ==
In 1999 Bambanze was one of the founding members of Unite for the Promotion of Batwa (UNIPROBA), an organization of Batwa people that supports the Batwa. He was coordinator of this organization on several occasions. Bambanze joined the Office of the United Nations High Commissioner for Human Rights (OHCHR) Indigenous Fellowship Programme. He did a six-month internship on human rights at the United Nations in Geneva, and obtained an expert certificate in the defense of the rights of indigenous peoples.

Vital Bambanze was appointed to the Senate of Burundi as a representative of the Batwa Indigenous Peoples, serving from 2010 to 2015. His cousin is Charles Masabo, who served in the Senate as a Batwa representative from 2005 to 2010. He was appointed by the President of Burundi as Batwa Representative to the National Land Commission. In 2011 he was elected a member of the United Nations Expert Mechanism on the Rights of Indigenous Peoples, a mandate of the United Nations Human Rights Council. He became president of this mandate. In November 2011 he spoke at a side event of the 36th General Conference of UNESCO, entitled "Knowledge Systems, Knowledge Diversity, Knowledge Societies: Towards a UNESCO Policy on Engaging with Indigenous Peoples".

As of 2020 Bambanze was Director of UNIPROBA. He was a member of the United Nations Permanent Forum on Indigenous Issues 2020–2022. He was reappointed to the forum for 1 January 2023 to 31 December 2025. As of 2024 he was deputy regional representative for the Great Lakes in the Indigenous Peoples of Africa Co-ordinating Committee (IPACC). He was also a Member of REPALEAC (Réseau des Populations Autochthones et Locales pour la Gestion Durables des Ecosystemes Forestiers d’Afrique Centale).

== Sources ==
- "Au coin du feu avec Vital Bambanze", Iwacu
- Current UNPFII Members, UN Department of Economic and Social Affairs: Social Inclusion
- Meet the IPACC Team, IPACC
- Membership of Permanent Forum on Indigenous Issues 2020-2022, UN Department of Economic and Social Affairs, Indigenous Peoples, 1 January 2022
- UNESCO Policy on Engaging with Indigenous Peoples - Vital Bambanze, UNESCO
