= Germany–Rwanda relations =

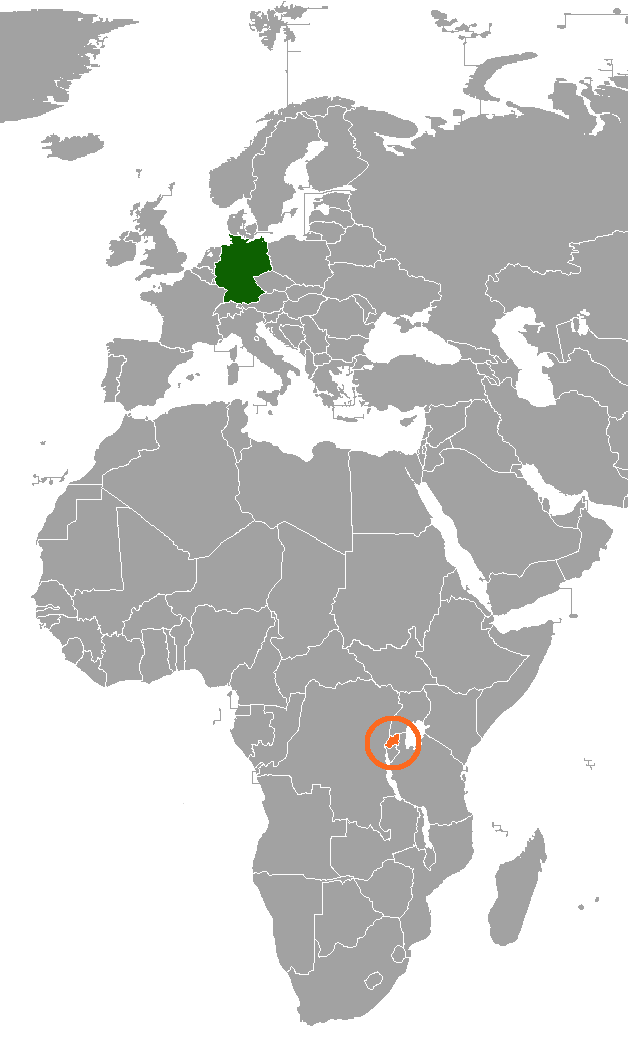

- Germany: Rwanda

Germany–Rwanda relations are good and there is a "close and pragmatic" relationship between the two countries, according to the German Foreign Office. In the 21st century, Germany is one of the most important donors of development aid to Rwanda, following the German reunification in 1990 and the 1994 genocide. Germany has an embassy in Kigali, while Rwanda has an embassy in Berlin.

== History ==
As part of the colonial division of Africa by the European powers, the German Empire gradually took possession of the two kingdoms of Rwanda and Burundi after the Berlin Conference on Africa and incorporated them into its Protectorate of German East Africa from about 1897. German rule was indirect for most of the time, with overlordship by local rulers allied with the Germans. In 1907, the German physician and explorer Richard Kandt founded the city of Kigali. After the German defeat in World War I, the Rwanda-Urundi area fell to Belgium. In retrospect, German colonial rule in Rwanda was often nostalgically glorified and positively contrasted with that of Belgium.

During the decolonization of Africa, the independent states of Rwanda and Burundi emerged from Rwanda-Urundi in 1962. In 1963, Rwanda and the Federal Republic of Germany (FRG) established diplomatic relations and a German embassy was established in Kigali. After the end of the Hallstein Doctrine, Rwanda also established relations with the German Democratic Republic (GDR) in 1973. In the 1970s, the German Armed Forces trained Rwandan troops, and in 1977 President Juvenal Habyarimana visited Bonn.

In 1984, Rwanda and the German state of Rhineland-Palatinate established a partnership, and in 1991 a cultural agreement was signed between Germany and Rwanda. The 1994 genocide in Rwanda led to an intense focus on the country by the German public and society, and numerous reports on the events were published in the German-language media. The German government provided humanitarian aid, but like the rest of the international community, took no concrete steps to end the massacres in the country.

After Paul Kagame came to power in Rwanda, Germany and Rwanda became close partners in development cooperation and established close diplomatic relations, despite Kagame's autocratic style of government and Rwandan involvement in armed conflicts in neighboring countries. In 2012, Germany briefly suspended its development assistance after Rwanda's support for rebels in eastern Congo was proven. Soon after, Germany became the first country to resume development cooperation with Rwanda.

== Economic exchange ==
The total volume of trade with Rwanda amounted to 94 million Euro in 2021, placing Rwanda 139th in the ranking of German trading partners. There are an increasing number of German companies operating in Rwanda. In 2018, Volkswagen Group established a plant in Rwanda and announced investments of €16 million. In 2022, the pharma company BioNtech began construction of a production center for the manufacture of MRNA vaccines for the whole of Africa in Rwanda.

== Development cooperation ==
The joint development partnership focuses on peace and social cohesion, education and sustainable growth, and climate and energy. Due to the relatively well-functioning state structures, many important projects of development cooperation could be realized in Rwanda, and Rwanda is considered a model country for the implementation of successful development projects compared to neighboring countries. From 2020 to 2022, German aid payments amounted to 90.55 million Euro.

== Partnership Rhineland-Palatinate–Rwanda ==
Rwanda and the German state of Rhineland-Palatinate have been twinned since 1982, with Rhineland-Palatinate focusing most of its international development efforts on the African country. The Rhineland-Palatinate-Rwanda Partnership Association, based in Mainz and with a coordination office in Kigali, serves to support the partnership. Close relations exist, especially at the level of municipalities and the education system, with over 250 school partnerships. Churches, universities and colleges, associations, companies and social groups such as sports clubs and educational institutions also participate in the partnership. There are also contacts at the political level, expressed, for example, in meetings between the Rwandan president and the minister-president of Rhineland-Palatinate.

== Cultural relations ==
There has been a Goethe-Institut in Rwanda since 2009, which was expanded into its own office in 2014 and promotes the German language and culture in the country. The German Academic Exchange Service has been active in the country since 2016 and promotes exchange at the university level. Close civil society relations exist especially with the federal state of Rhineland-Palatinate. In Kigali, there is the Kandt House Museum, which was renovated in 2017 and includes an exhibition on the German colonial period. In 2025 Rwanda claimed that criticism towards German football club Bayern Munich, and their sponsorship with Visit Rwanda, was a danger towards Rwandan peace and stabilization.

== Diplomatic locations ==
- Germany has an embassy in Kigali.
- Rwanda has an embassy in Berlin.
