= Charles Masabo =

Senator of Burundi

Senator for Kirundo Province
- In office 2005–2010
- Succeeded by: Vital Bambanze

Charles Masabo is a Twa from Kirundo Province, Burundi, who has served as a Senator, and has been involved in various international forums as a representative of the Twa.

== Senator ==
The Senate of Burundi includes three representatives of the Twa ethnic minority, who are co-opted rather than elected. On 9 August 2005 Charles Masabo was co-opted to serve as Twa senator for the province of Kirundo. His cousin is Vital Bambanze, who succeeded him in the Senate in 2010.

== International forums ==
Masabo was a member of the Unissons-nous pour la Promotion des Batwa (UNIPROBA). As part of the Working Group on Indigenous Populations in 2005 he contributed to the review of developments in the area of "Indigenous peoples and the international and domestic protection of traditional knowledge". In August 2007 the Secretariat of the Convention on Biological Diversity listed him among the beneficiaries of the Voluntary Trust Fund that provided financing so he could attend WGABS-5 and WG8J-5 meetings in Montreal, Canada in October 2007. In 2008 he served on the United Nations Permanent Forum on Indigenous Issues, contributing to implementation of recommendations on the six mandated areas of health.

As of February 2024 the United Nations Global Framework on Chemicals listed Masabo as an NGO focal point, coordinator for UNIPROBA.

== Sources ==
- Arret No RCCB 148 (PDF) (in French), Constitutional Court of Burundi, 8 August 2005
- "Au coin du feu avec Vital Bambanze", Iwacu
- Indigenous Organisations/Africa/Unissons-nous pour la Promotion des Batwa - UNIPROBA, DOCIP
- NGOs Focal points, Global Framework on Chemicals
- SCBD/SEL/OJ/SG/58785 (PDF), Secretaría del Convenio sobre la Diversidad Biológica, 14 August 2007
- Working Group on Indigenous Populations 2005 04b, DOCIP
