= Mwaro =

- Location in Burundi
- Coordinates: 3°32′S 29°42′E
- Country: Burundi
- Province: Mwaro Province
- Elevation: 1,940 m (6,360 ft)

Population (2008)
  - Total: 2,403

Mwaro is a city located in central Burundi. It is the capital city of Mwaro Province.
