= Mwaro Province =

Former province of Burundi

Coordinates: 03°30′43″S 29°41′57″E

- province
- Country: Burundi
- Capital: Mwaro

Area
  - Total: 839.60 km^{2} (324.17 sq mi)

Population (2008 census)
  - Total: 273,143
  - Density: 325.33/km^{2} (842.59/sq mi)

Mwaro Province was one of the provinces of Burundi. Its capital was Mwaro. In 2025, it was merged into Gitega Province.

Mwaro Province was one of two provinces that were created in 1999 as a result of splitting the Muramvya Province; the other province retained the name of Muramvya.

== Location ==
Mwaro Province was in the center of western Burundi. It was south of Muramvya Province, east of Gitega Province, north of Bururi Province and east of Bujumbura Rural Province. The western part of the province was in the Mugamba natural region and the eastern part in the Kirimiro natural region. Small areas in the south were in the Bututsi natural region.

== Communes ==
It was divided administratively into the following communes:

- Commune of Bisoro
- Commune of Gisozi
- Commune of Kayokwe
- Commune of Ndava
- Commune of Nyabihanga
- Commune of Rusaka

== Sources ==
- Atlas des quatre sites Ramsar: Localisation et Resources (PDF) (in French), Ministry of Water, Environment and Urbanism, October 2014
