= List of presidents of Burundi =

The president of Burundi is the head of state and head of government of the Republic of Burundi. The president is also commander-in-chief of the National Defence Force. The office of the presidency was established when Michel Micombero declared Burundi a republic on 28 November 1966. The first constitution to specify the powers and duties of the president was the constitution of 1974, which was adopted in 1976. Written by Micombero, the constitution affirmed his position as the first president of Burundi. The powers of the president derive from the latest constitution, implemented in 2005 as a result of the 2000 Arusha Accords after the Burundian Civil War.

Nine people have served in the office since Burundi became a republic. Only one president, Pierre Buyoya, has served on two non-consecutive occasions. Sylvie Kinigi was the first and only woman who has served in the role (on an interim basis). The current president, Évariste Ndayishimiye, has been serving in the role since 18 June 2020.

== List of officeholders ==
Political parties

Union for National Progress (UPRONA)
Front for Democracy in Burundi (FRODEBU)
National Council for the Defense of Democracy – Forces for the Defense of Democracy (CNDD–FDD)

Status

‡ Denotes acting president

Symbols

^{†} Died in office

List of presidents of Burundi
| No. | Portrait | Name (Birth–Death) | Elected | Term of office | | | Ethnic group | Political party | Prime minister(s) | Ref. |
| No. | Portrait | Name (Birth–Death) | Elected | Took office | Left office | Time in office | Ethnic group | Political party | Prime minister(s) | Ref. |
|---|---|---|---|---|---|---|---|---|---|---|
| 1 | Michel Micombero | Michel Micombero (1940–1983) | — | 28 November 1966 | 1 November 1976 (Deposed in coup) | 9 years, 339 days | Tutsi | UPRONA / Military | Nyamoya | |
| 2 | Jean-Baptiste Bagaza | Jean-Baptiste Bagaza (1946–2016) (Note: Styled as Chairman of the Supreme Revolutionary Council until 10 November 1976.) | 1984 | 1 November 1976 | 3 September 1987 (Deposed in coup) | 10 years, 306 days | Tutsi | UPRONA / Military | Nzambimana | |
| 3 | Pierre Buyoya | Pierre Buyoya (1949–2020) (Note: Styled as Chairman of the Military Committee of National Salvation until 9 September 1987.) | — | 3 September 1987 | 10 July 1993 | 5 years, 310 days | Tutsi | UPRONA / Military | Sibomana | |
| 4 | Melchior Ndadaye | Melchior Ndadaye (1953–1993) | 1993 | 10 July 1993 | 21 October 1993 (Assassinated) | 103 days | Hutu | FRODEBU | Kinigi | |
| — | | François Ngeze‡ (born 1953) (Note: Styled as Chairman of the Committee of Public Salvation; in rebellion.) | — | 21 October 1993 | 27 October 1993 | 6 days | Hutu | UPRONA / Military | — | |
| — | Sylvie Kinigi | Sylvie Kinigi‡ (born 1953) (Note: On 21 October 1993, President Ndadaye and several other officials were killed by Tutsi soldiers in a coup attempt, leaving Prime Minister Kinigi the highest-ranking official alive and the de facto head of state of Burundi. Kinigi joined her surviving ministers in the French embassy until she could return to her residence under French military guard as the coup failed.) (Note: On 8 November 1993 the Constitutional Court ruled that "the government acting collegially" assumed the responsibilities of the interim presidency until a new president could be elected.) | — | 27 October 1993 (Note: De facto President from 21 October 1993.) | 5 February 1994 | 101 days | Tutsi | UPRONA | Herself | |
| 5 | Cyprien Ntaryamira | Cyprien Ntaryamira (1955–1994) | 1994 | 5 February 1994 | 6 April 1994 (Assassinated) | 60 days | Hutu | FRODEBU | Kinigi; Kanyenkiko | |
| 6 | Sylvestre Ntibantunganya | Sylvestre Ntibantunganya (born 1956) | — | 6 April 1994‡ | 1 October 1994 | 2 years, 110 days | Hutu | FRODEBU | Kanyenkiko; Nduwayo | |
| 6 | Sylvestre Ntibantunganya | Sylvestre Ntibantunganya (born 1956) | 1994 | 1 October 1994 | 25 July 1996 (Deposed in coup) | 2 years, 110 days | Hutu | FRODEBU | Kanyenkiko; Nduwayo | |
| (3) | Pierre Buyoya | Pierre Buyoya (1949–2020) | — | 25 July 1996‡ | 11 June 1998 | 6 years, 279 days | Tutsi | UPRONA | Ndimira | |
| (3) | Pierre Buyoya | Pierre Buyoya (1949–2020) | — | 11 June 1998 | 30 April 2003 | 6 years, 279 days | Tutsi | UPRONA | Position abolished | |
| 7 | Domitien Ndayizeye | Domitien Ndayizeye (born 1953) | — | 30 April 2003 | 26 August 2005 | 2 years, 118 days | Hutu | FRODEBU | Position abolished | |
| 8 | Pierre Nkurunziza | Pierre Nkurunziza (1964–2020) | 2005; 2010; 2015 | 26 August 2005 | 8 June 2020^{[†]} | 14 years, 287 days | Hutu | CNDD–FDD | Position abolished | |
Vacant (8 June 2020 – 18 June 2020)
| 9 | Evariste Ndayishimiye | Évariste Ndayishimiye (born 1968) | 2020 | 18 June 2020 | Incumbent | 6 years, 100 days | Hutu | CNDD–FDD | Position abolished (until 23 June 2020) Bunyoni; Ndirakobuca; Ntahontuye | |

== See also ==
- Politics of Burundi
- List of kings of Burundi
- Vice President of Burundi
- Prime Minister of Burundi
- List of colonial governors of Ruanda-Urundi
  - List of colonial residents of Burundi
