= 1993 in Burundi =

- Decades: 1970s; 1980s; 1990s; 2000s; 2010s
- See also: Other events of 1993; List of years in Burundi

The following lists events that happened during 1993 in Burundi.

== Incumbents ==
- President:
  - until July 10: Pierre Buyoya
  - July 10-October 21: Melchior Ndadaye
  - October 21-October 27: François Ngeze
  - starting October 27: Sylvie Kinigi
- Prime Minister: Adrien Sibomana (until July 10), Sylvie Kinigi (starting July 10)

== Events ==
=== October ===
- October 21 - President Ndadaye was assassinated by Tutsi extremists, starting another genocide against Tutsis and a civil war.
