= 1994 in Burundi =

- Decades: 1970s; 1980s; 1990s; 2000s; 2010s
- See also: Other events of 1994; List of years in Burundi

The following lists events that happened during 1994 in Burundi.

== Incumbents ==
- President:
  - acting until February 5: Sylvie Kinigi
  - February 5-April 6: Cyprien Ntaryamira
  - starting April 6: Sylvestre Ntibantunganya
- Prime Minister: Sylvie Kinigi (until February 5), Anatole Kanyenkiko (starting February 5)

== Events ==
=== April ===
- April 6 - The airplane carrying Rwandan President Juvénal Habyarimana and Burundian President Cyprien Ntaryamira was shot down by Hutu extremists as it prepared to land in Kigali. This was the major cause for the Rwandan genocide in Rwanda.
