= Human rights in Burundi =

In 2024, Freedom House rated Burundi's human rights at 14 out 100 (not free).

== Overview ==
Burundi is governed as a presidential representative democratic republic, with an estimated population of 10,557,259 in 2012. The country has experienced a long history of social unrest and ethnic tension between the Hutu majority and Tutsi minority, with successive civil wars jeopardizing national development since Burundi's decolonization as a Belgian territory in 1962. The most recent conflict broke out in 1993 with the assassination of Burundi's first democratically elected president, Melchior Ndadaye, and led to large-scale violations of human rights and general impunity. In line with the Arusha Agreement of August 2000, peace was brokered between rebel groups the National Council for the Defense of Democracy–Forces for the Defense of Democracy (CNDD-FDD) and the National Forces of Liberation (FNL), and a new Constitution was adopted by national referendum in 2005. The Constitution established cognitive institutions of State, including the Executive, Judiciary, and Legislature, with a view to promoting the rule of law and a more cogent human rights framework.

In 2010, the incumbent CNDD-FDD party won its second municipal elections, despite accusations of intimidation, fraud, inciting political violence, and restricting freedoms of association and expression around election time. Accordingly, the legitimacy of these newly established institutions of State has been drawn into question in light of the irregularities and repression of the elections. The major challenge facing the advancement of human rights in Burundi continues to stem from the continuance of political volatility, and the persistence of discriminatory remedies of Customary Law in the absence of an accountable justice system.

Burundi has, since gaining its independence, been cited as a State guilty of widespread violations of human rights. A 2010 Transparency International report named Burundi as the most corrupt country in East Africa.

== International Legal Instruments Ratified by Burundi ==
Burundi has ratified and acceded to a number of significant human rights instruments, including the International Covenant on Civil and Political Rights (ICCPR), International Covenant on Economic, Social and Cultural Rights (ICESCR), African Charter on Human and Peoples Rights (ACHPR), Convention on the Prevention and Punishment of the Crime of Genocide (CPPCG), and the United Nations Convention Against Torture (Convention against Torture and Other Cruel, Inhuman or Degrading Treatment or Punishment – CATCIDTP). Articles 13-19 of the Burundian Constitution embody these rights.

Following the recommendations of a Universal Periodic Review (UPR) in 2008, Burundi ratified the International Convention for the Protection of All Persons from Enforced Disappearance (ICPPED), Optional Protocol to the Convention on the Elimination of All Forms of Discrimination against Women (OP-CEDAW), and the Optional Protocol to the Convention against Torture and other Cruel, Inhuman or Degrading Treatment or Punishment (OPCAT). During the UPR, a panel of 41 delegations praised Burundi's ratification of a substantial number of international instruments.

== National Independent Human Rights Commission (NIHRC) ==
In 2000, a rudimentary Governmental Commission on Human Rights was set up, which at the recommendation of the 2008 Universal Periodic Review (UPR) became the National Independent Human Rights Commission in 2009. However, the institution is yet to be accredited by the International Coordinating Committee of National Human Rights Institutions, thus lacks the key element of compliance with Paris Principles. Its current role as an investigatory and reporting body remains unfulfilled.

In a 2011 report, Human Rights Watch called on the government to strengthen its support for the NIHRC. The role of a national Commission has become increasingly important since the termination of a United Nations Human Rights Council mandate in the country in September 2011. This coincides with a rapid rise in politically motivated killings and general impunity throughout the country. The Burundian government, however, has been reluctant in providing adequate financial support to the Commission, thus its ability to investigate serious violations of human rights is significantly compromised.

== 2010 Elections ==
Despite the flourishing of multiparty politics in Burundi (an unusual characteristic for the region), Amnesty International noted in a 2011 report that repressive tactics are often taken out by political parties with a view to precluding other parties from electoral success. This practice rendered the 2010 elections particularly volatile. As polls closed in June, it was reported that "the voting was held against the backdrop of daily grenade blasts that threatened to push the country back into civil strife", and that political freedom was severely compromised. The Burundian non-governmental organization (NGO) Commission Episcopale et Paix documented a range of violations during the elections, including campaigning before the legally authorized campaign period, assassinations, arbitrary arrests, verbal confrontations, fraud, restrictions on the right to free assembly, bribery, and hiring and firing based on political affiliation. At least six political parties had committed offenses, but the ruling CNDD-FDD was cited as most frequently responsible. In the wake of the elections (which the incumbent CNDD-FDD and President Pierre Nkurunziza won after the opposition pulled out), reciprocal killings were perpetrated by the government against the former rebel group, and its main opposition rival, the Hutu FNL.

While freedom of speech is constitutionally guaranteed, Freedom House noted several instances during and after the election where journalists had been targeted for criticizing the government. This included arbitrary arrests, threats, detainment, and beatings. Consequently, in 2011 Burundi was given the press status of 'Not Free' by the NGO. In March 2019, seven minor schoolgirls were arrested for doodling on a portrait of President Nkurunziza's face in their schoolbooks. Four of them, the youngest of whom was 13, were released, but the remaining three were formally charged on March 18 with "insulting the head of state" which carries a jail sentence of up to five years.

== Universal Periodic Review (UPR) ==
The Working Group on the UPR, in accordance with the Human Rights Council (HRC), held its review on Burundi in December 2009. The next UPR is planned for 2014.

In the report of the Working Group, Burundi's Criminal Code was criticized for a number of shortcomings. The Working Group highlighted several areas of concern for the development of human rights, including:

1. Persistent use of torture;
2. Widespread sexual violence;
3. Extrajudicial killings;
4. Arbitrary arrests;
5. Poor detention facilities;
6. Impunity enjoyed by rapists;
7. The use of rape as a weapon of war;
8. Extrajudicial adjudication of rape cases;
9. The practice of marriage between rapist and victim;
10. Lack of judicial independence;
11. Absence of a juvenile justice system;
12. Lack of an adequate supervisory system in places of detention; and
13. Proposed criminal sanctions in the Code against homosexuality.

The report also examined key areas of concern in more detail.

=== The right to life ===
Although guaranteed in the Constitution, the 1993-2005 civil war led to massive violations of the right to life. A primary cause behind these violations was the proliferation of firearms among the civil population. A 2011 Human Rights Watch report suggested that government officials distributed weapons to civilians associated with the CNDD-FDD and police officers provided military training to civilians. Additionally, individual conceptions of justice had resulted in isolated cases of lynching. The Working Group cited judicial delay as a major factor in inciting people to take justice into their own hands. General governmental and police inertia had contributed to the perception that State institutions cannot provide protection, and that citizens must be accountable for their own safety.

Burundi has not ratified the Second Optional Protocol to the International Covenant on Civil and Political Rights, although it has expressed interest in amending the Criminal Code insofar abolishing capital punishment.

=== The prohibition of torture ===
The Working Group noted that in 2006, Burundi submitted a report to the United Nations Convention Against Torture. In its response, the UN Committee expressed concern at the lack of clarity in Burundian law surrounding the status of torture in the statute books, and recommended the government focus on implementing the CATCIDTP domestically and formulate a legislative definition of torture. Concern was also expressed by the Committee at the lack of provision in the Criminal Code relating to protection whilst in police custody, and available access to legal aid. The Working Group reiterated these messages, but highlighted an overall decline in reported torture cases since 2007. The number of torture cases greatly increased during the Burundian unrest.

=== The right to equality of the sexes ===
The Working Group noted that the Burundian government had taken step

- Formulating and adopting a national gender policy;
- Formulating an action plan for the implementation thereof;
- Integrating the gender dimension throughout all government ministries; and
- Taking steps towards the establishment of a National Gender Council.

However, the report noted that despite these efforts at the governmental level, the gender approach had not been fully accepted by Burundian society. The disparity manifested itself most notably at the public service level; women were vastly underrepresented at all levels of decision making in government. The Working Group thus recommended the national gender policy be extended to adopt an array of changes equalizing laws of succession, taxation, adultery, the selling of family assets, labour codes, and the standardization of the age of marriage.

The 1993-2005 conflict particularly heightened gender-based abuse.

=== The rights of the child ===
The report noted that the situation of children in Burundi is deteriorating. Ongoing conflict, poverty, and high rates of HIV/AIDS were cited as the main factors contributing to the plight of Burundian children. (A Unicef study in 2010 found 68% of households in Burundi living in poverty, and 17% of children orphaned because of AIDS). In spite of the government's insistence that it does not recruit soldiers under the age of 18, the report also highlighted concerns that the recruitment of child soldiers persists. Partisan youth groups add to political volatility, raising concerns that youth could easily be manipulated into carrying out acts of violence.

The report also noted the lack of a juvenile justice system. The holding of children in the same cells as convicted adults made them extremely vulnerable to abuse.

=== Sexual violence ===
The phenomenon of sexual violence, particularly against women and children, was cited by the Working Group as one of the critical areas for concern. However, there was a significant lack of data pertaining to the number of sexual assaults taking place throughout the country; this was partly due to cultural prejudice, meaning some cases are not reported and instead adjudicated within the family.

The Initiative for Peacebuilding noted in a 2010 study on gender issues in Burundi that there is a strong correlation between areas of intense military activity and high incidences of sexual violence. Furthermore, Amnesty International claims rape, in addition to physical mutilation, was used during the 1993-2005 conflict as 'a strategy of war'

=== The rights of victims ===
Because of the prevalence of conflict in Burundi since independence, the country has witnessed a massive exodus of Burundian refugees to neighboring countries (predominantly Tanzania, Rwanda, and the Democratic Republic of the Congo). Most repatriated citizens returning since the 1993 conflict had found their properties either already occupied or requisitioned by the State. This had led to problems with destitution and homelessness. The report noted the saturation of the courts with cases of land disputes; the consequent judicial delay leading to violence between parties. With the aim of settling these disputes, the government had set up the Land and Other Properties Commission which sought to resolve these land problems and rehabilitate victims. However, a 2008 report of the United Nations High Commissioner for Refugees noted the Commission has limited powers and 'is not able to handle disputes within expected timelines'.

The abrogation of the rights of victims also fed directly into the right to housing. The 1993 crisis destroyed a substantial number of settlements, which gave rise to a significant humanitarian challenge. A governmental housing policy had met the needs of some, but not the majority of, destitute Burundians.

=== The right to equitable justice ===
Although the Constitution guarantees the right to a fair trial, the exercise of this right is often undermined by the inadequacy of human, financial, material and logistic resources. Amnesty International noted in its submission to the Working Group that the judiciary is hindered by corruption, a lack of resources and training, and executive interference. Consequently, a large number of cases go unreported. In its submission to the Working Group, the International Court of Justice urged Burundi to 'refrain, as a matter of priority, from arbitrary detention, extrajudicial and arbitrary executions...and ensure that persons arrested or detained on criminal charges are held in official places of detention'. There have been many cases of extrajudicial killings during the Burundian unrest.

Prison conditions in Burundi are dire. Decent food, clothing, hygiene and medical care cannot be properly funded by their low budget. The prisons are also overcrowded. In November 2018 10,987 persons were officially detained in Burundi's prisons, which are only designed to hold 4,195. NGO workers believe that many detainees receive no legal assistance, accused persons stay imprisoned without trial for long periods of time and that penal alternatives to prison sentencing must be introduced.

== Human Rights Council (HRC) response to the UPR ==
In a report issued in March 2009, the HRC adopted all recommendations the Working Group made in respect of Burundi. In particular, the Council applauded the introduction of a new penal code which criminalized war crimes, crimes against humanity, genocide, torture, rape and sexual violence, and guaranteed children's rights. It also encouraged the ongoing development of the NIHRC.

== National response to the UPR ==
Although the aforementioned amendments were introduced to the statute books in 2009, in the same revision the government officially criminalized same-sex relations. The Burundian gay rights group Humure has since reported cases of forced evictions of homosexuals. However, it is noted that homophobia in Burundi is not as extreme as cases in other African countries, where the penalty for homosexuality is death.

International Bridges to Justice report that prison conditions remain poor, and more than 60% of inmates are pre-trial detainees. Little progress has been made in the area of improving public defender and legal aid services.

In the wake of the 2010 elections, Human Rights Watch reported that the National Intelligence Service arbitrarily practiced physical and psychological torture on members of the opposition who had been arrested on a variety of dubious charges, including 'threatening state security' and 'participation in armed groups'.

A September 2010 report published by the Center for Global Development highlighted that Burundi had made progress in only one of its 15 Millennium Development Goals.

== Other civil liberties ==
The constitution addresses issues such as freedom of speech and of the press; however, the government generally did not respect these rights in practice.

In April 2009, 782 people were arrested arbitrarily during the political unrest between political factions and the military.

Government security forces continued to commit numerous serious human rights abuses, including killings, rapes, and beatings of civilians and detainees with widespread impunity. Human rights problems also included vigilante abuse and personal score-settling; rape of men and boys; harsh, life-threatening prison and detention center conditions; prolonged prenatal detention and arbitrary arrest and detention; lack of judicial dependence and efficiency, and judicial corruption; detention and imprisonment of social prisoners and political detainees; and restrictions on freedom of speech, assembly, and association, especially for political parties. Domestic and sexual violence and discrimination against women remained problems. Homosexuality remains widely unaccepted for the Burundi people, and their government.

Burundi's government has been repeatedly criticized by human rights organizations including The Committee to Protect Journalists, Human Rights Watch, and Front Line for the multiple arrests and trials of journalist Jean-Claude Kavumbagu for issues related to his reporting. Amnesty International named him a prisoner of conscience and called for his "immediate and unconditional release." On 13 May 2011, Kavumbagu was acquitted of treason, but found guilty on the charge of publishing an article "likely to discredit the state or economy". He was sentenced to eight months' imprisonment and was released for time served. Human Rights Watch and the Committee to Protect Journalists protested the verdict, the latter reiterating its belief that "Burundi should decriminalize press offenses and allow journalists to speak and write freely without fear of harassment or arrest". In early 2018, Human Rights Watch published documents on how Burundi's security services and members of the ruling party Imbonerakure beat, raped, and killed suspected opponents during the month of May. The referendum for constitution was held on May 17.

On 1 June 2020, the Human Rights Watch documented serious allegations of abuse during Burundi's presidential, legislative and communal elections on May 20. The elections were mutilated by violence, arrests of opposition members, including candidates, and a crackdown on free speech.

On 13 July 2020, Amnesty International demanded the release of Burundian human rights defender Germain Rukuki, who is currently serving a 32-year prison sentence for advocating for human rights.

On 18 May 2022, Human Rights Watch published a report that human rights abuses by Imbonerakure members have substantially worsened since Évariste Ndayishimiye became president in 2020, particularly in the northwestern part of the country.

== Historical situation ==
The following chart shows Burundi's ratings since 1972 in the Freedom in the World reports, published annually by Freedom House. A rating of 1 is "free"; 7, "not free".^{1}

Historical ratings

Year	Political Rights	Civil Liberties	Status	President^{2}
1972	7	7	Not Free	Michel Micombero
1973	7	7	Not Free	Michel Micombero
1974	7	7	Not Free	Michel Micombero
1975	7	6	Not Free	Michel Micombero
1976	7	6	Not Free	Michel Micombero
1977	7	6	Not Free	Jean-Baptiste Bagaza
1978	7	7	Not Free	Jean-Baptiste Bagaza
1979	7	7	Not Free	Jean-Baptiste Bagaza
1980	7	6	Not Free	Jean-Baptiste Bagaza
1981	7	6	Not Free	Jean-Baptiste Bagaza
1982^{3}	7	6	Not Free	Jean-Baptiste Bagaza
1983	6	6	Not Free	Jean-Baptiste Bagaza
1984	7	6	Not Free	Jean-Baptiste Bagaza
1985	7	6	Not Free	Jean-Baptiste Bagaza
1986	7	6	Not Free	Jean-Baptiste Bagaza
1987	7	6	Not Free	Jean-Baptiste Bagaza
1988	7	6	Not Free	Pierre Buyoya
1989	7	6	Not Free	Pierre Buyoya
1990	7	6	Not Free	Pierre Buyoya
1991	7	6	Not Free	Pierre Buyoya
1992	6	5	Partly Free	Pierre Buyoya
1993	7	7	Not Free	Pierre Buyoya
1994	6	7	Not Free	Sylvie Kinigi
1995	6	7	Not Free	Sylvestre Ntibantunganya
1996	7	7	Not Free	Sylvestre Ntibantunganya
1997	7	7	Not Free	Pierre Buyoya
1998	7	6	Not Free	Pierre Buyoya
1999	6	6	Not Free	Pierre Buyoya
2000	6	6	Not Free	Pierre Buyoya
2001	6	6	Not Free	Pierre Buyoya
2002	6	5	Not Free	Pierre Buyoya
2003	5	5	Partly Free	Pierre Buyoya
2004	5	5	Partly Free	Domitien Ndayizeye
2005	3	5	Partly Free	Domitien Ndayizeye
2006	4	5	Partly Free	Pierre Nkurunziza
2007	4	5	Partly Free	Pierre Nkurunziza
2008	4	5	Partly Free	Pierre Nkurunziza
2009	4	5	Partly Free	Pierre Nkurunziza
2010	5	5	Partly Free	Pierre Nkurunziza
2011	5	5	Partly Free	Pierre Nkurunziza
2012	5	5	Partly Free	Pierre Nkurunziza
2013	5	5	Partly Free	Pierre Nkurunziza
2014	6	5	Not Free	Pierre Nkurunziza
2015	7	6	Not Free	Pierre Nkurunziza
2016	7	6	Not Free	Pierre Nkurunziza
2017	7	6	Not Free	Pierre Nkurunziza
2018	7	6	Not Free	Pierre Nkurunziza
2019	7	6	Not Free	Pierre Nkurunziza
2020	7	6	Not Free	Pierre Nkurunziza
2021	7	6	Not Free	Évariste Ndayishimiye
2022	7	6	Not Free	Évariste Ndayishimiye
2023	7	6	Not Free	Évariste Ndayishimiye

== International treaties ==
Burundi's stances on international human rights treaties are as follows:

International treaties
Treaty	Organization	Introduced	Signed	Ratified
Convention on the Prevention and Punishment of the Crime of Genocide	United Nations	1948	-	1997
International Convention on the Elimination of All Forms of Racial Discrimination	United Nations	1966	1967	1977
International Covenant on Economic, Social and Cultural Rights	United Nations	1966	-	1990
International Covenant on Civil and Political Rights	United Nations	1966	-	1990
First Optional Protocol to the International Covenant on Civil and Political Rights	United Nations	1966	-	-
Convention on the Non-Applicability of Statutory Limitations to War Crimes and Crimes Against Humanity	United Nations	1968	-	-
International Convention on the Suppression and Punishment of the Crime of Apartheid	United Nations	1973	-	-
Convention on the Elimination of All Forms of Discrimination against Women	United Nations	1979	1980	1992
Convention against Torture and Other Cruel, Inhuman or Degrading Treatment or Punishment	United Nations	1984	-	1993
Convention on the Rights of the Child	United Nations	1989	1990	1990
Second Optional Protocol to the International Covenant on Civil and Political Rights, aiming at the abolition of the death penalty	United Nations	1989	-	-
International Convention on the Protection of the Rights of All Migrant Workers and Members of Their Families	United Nations	1990	-	-
Optional Protocol to the Convention on the Elimination of All Forms of Discrimination against Women	United Nations	1999	2001	-
Optional Protocol to the Convention on the Rights of the Child on the Involvement of Children in Armed Conflict	United Nations	2000	2001	2008
Optional Protocol to the Convention on the Rights of the Child on the Sale of Children, Child Prostitution and Child Pornography	United Nations	2000	-	2007
Convention on the Rights of Persons with Disabilities	United Nations	2006	2007	-
Optional Protocol to the Convention on the Rights of Persons with Disabilities	United Nations	2006	2007	-
International Convention for the Protection of All Persons from Enforced Disappearance	United Nations	2006	2007	-
Optional Protocol to the International Covenant on Economic, Social and Cultural Rights	United Nations	2008	-	-
Optional Protocol to the Convention on the Rights of the Child on a Communications Procedure	United Nations	2011	-	-

== See also ==
- Freedom of religion in Burundi
- Human trafficking in Burundi
- Internet censorship and surveillance in Burundi
- LGBT rights in Burundi
- Politics of Burundi

== Notes ==
1.Note that the "Year" signifies the "Year covered". Therefore the information for the year marked 2008 is from the report published in 2009, and so on.
2.As of January 1.
3.The 1982 report covers the year 1981 and the first half of 1982, and the following 1984 report covers the second half of 1982 and the whole of 1983. In the interest of simplicity, these two aberrant "year and a half" reports have been split into three year-long reports through interpolation.
