= Human trafficking in Burundi =

Burundi ratified the 2000 UN TIP Protocol in May 2012.

In 2010 the government made clear progress in combating trafficking during the reporting period, particularly with regard to identifying trafficking victims, investigating potential trafficking offenses, and raising public awareness. In 2009, a Bujumbura court heard a case involving child domestic servitude, the first known prosecution of a case involving elements of a human trafficking offense. In 2014, a law was enacted that criminalized all forms of trafficking, but little was done to enforce action, so many officials did not change how trafficking was prioritized or recognized.

In 2018, Burundi was a source country for children and possibly women subjected to trafficking in persons, specifically conditions of involuntary domestic servitude and forced prostitution. Children and young adults may also have been coerced into forced labor on plantations or small farms in southern Burundi, or to conduct informal commerce in the streets. Child labor was very common in agricultural fields where major exports, like tea and coffee, were harvested. Forced labour of children and adults was also very common in mines due to a large market for valuable stones and ores. Many trafficking victims could be found in mines in the northern area of Burundi, especially around Cibitoke. Some traffickers may have been family or acquaintances of victims who, under the pretext of assisting underprivileged children with education or with false promises of lucrative jobs, subjected them to forced labor, most commonly as domestic servants. While there was little evidence of large-scale child prostitution, “benevolent” older females offered vulnerable younger girls room and board within their homes, and in some cases eventually pushed them into prostitution to pay for living expenses; extended family members also financially profited from the commercial sexual exploitation of young relatives residing with them. It was most common for the trafficking of victims to remain internal within the country or to extend only to the surrounding countries. Male tourists from Oman and the United Arab Emirates exploit Burundian girls in prostitution. Businessmen recruit Burundian girls for commercial sexual exploitation in Rwanda, Kenya, and Uganda, and recruit boys and girls for exploitation in various types of forced labor in Tanzania. Unlike in past years, there were no reports of forced or voluntary recruitment of children into government armed forces or rebel groups during the reporting period. If the trafficking of Burundians does extend externally, it is most common for them to be sent to locations in the Middle East and Western Europe.

In 2021 the International Organization for Migration (IOM) reported that "over 1,000 victims of human trafficking have been identified and assisted in Burundi since 2017."

The U.S. State Department's Office to Monitor and Combat Trafficking in Persons provides a Trafficking in Persons Report annually. In this report, every country is ranked on the basis of its government's participation in combating human trafficking and the following of the standards set by the Trafficking Victims Protection Act (TVPA) in 2000. "Tier 1" is the best possible ranking while "Tier 3" is the worst possible ranking. From 2015 to 2020 Burundi was given a ranking of "Tier 3." However, considerable changes have been made by the government and Burundi was given a ranking of "Tier 2" in the 2021 report. The country remained at Tier 2 in 2023.

In 2023, the Organised Crime Index gave the country a score of 8.5 out of 10 for human trafficking, noting numbers had increased during Covid and state officials took little practical action to tackle this crime.

== Prosecution ==
The government's prosecution of traffickers has been known to be hampered by lack of investigative equipment and training, poor evidence gathering by police, the unwillingness of victims to lodge complaints, and the failure of prosecutors to vigorously pursue cases after receiving evidence from police and suspected victims. Articles 242 and 243 of Burundi's criminal code prohibit human trafficking and smuggling, and prescribe sentences of five to 20 years’ imprisonment; the code does not, however, provide a definition of human trafficking, limiting its utility. Sex trafficking offenses can also be punished using penal code statutes on brothel-keeping and pimping (penalties of one to five years’ imprisonment), as well as child prostitution (penalties of five to 10 years’ imprisonment). The 2014 anti-trafficking law created set penalties for trafficking cases. According to the 2014 law, perpetrators can receive 5 to 10 years imprisonment for human trafficking, and 10-15 years if the case involves the trafficking of a child. In addition to jail time, offenders may also receive 100,000 to 500,000 Burundian francs in fines and may be fined 500,000 to 2,000,000 in cases involving a child. These penalties are sufficiently stringent and commensurate with those prescribed for other serious offenses, such as rape. During the 2021 reporting period, security and presence at the country's borders was increased to prevent international trafficking into and out of Burundi. The government has also been more cooperative with other countries to investigate cases of trafficking. Another major advancement by the Burundian government during the 2021 reporting period was the creation of a system that compiles all the efforts made by the government to combat human trafficking from six years prior to current day.

A Bujumbura court fined a woman $42 for abusing her 12-year-old domestic servant by burning her with melted plastic bags. Upon her arrest, police located the child's aunt, who returned the child to her parents in Bururi province. In August 2009, police arrested a Burundian man for kidnapping six boys between the ages of 12 and 13 and transporting them to Tanzania for forced labor in tobacco fields. The suspect's provisional release was revoked after an appeal from the prosecutor's office, and he remains in pre-trial detention in Rutana Province prison. Throughout 2009, the Women and Children's Brigade, a specialized police unit, successfully identified and rescued 10 of 17 child victims exploited by an international prostitution ring and returned them to their families; the alleged traffickers have not been arrested due to a lack of concrete evidence. In January 2010, police charged three men and their landlord with corruption of minors and incitement to debauchery after the former were found pimping underage girls from a rental house; the prosecution remained in the pre-trial stage at the end of the reporting period. During a December 2009 meeting with high-ranking police officials, President Nkurunziza instructed the police force to increase efforts to fight human trafficking. As a result of this mandate, police initiated a crackdown on clandestine brothels that housed potential trafficking victims in January 2010, shutting down three small hotels in the industrial quarter of Bujumbura.

One major struggle that Burundi has is through the training of law enforcement, prosecutors and judicial officials. Law enforcement has been reported to being unaware of trafficking laws and being unable to differentiate the illegal transport of migrants and the trafficking of migrants. While the government does provide some training to officials on trafficking laws, most are reliant on international organizations and NGOs to provide training. The COVID-19 pandemic also made the prosecution of traffickers difficult because lockdown prevented officials from obtaining witness statements.

== Protection ==
Despite its notable efforts to return trafficked children to their families, the government does not always adequately ensure that trafficking victims receive access to necessary protective services. The few care centers that exist in Burundi are operated by NGO's, religious organizations, and women's or children's associations. Police provide limited shelter and food assistance to victims in temporary police custody while authorities attempt to locate their families; these children are housed in a holding area separate from adult detainees. In some instances, the police, especially members of the Women and Children's Brigade, provide counseling to children in prostitution and mediate between these victims and their parents. The one care center that the government does run is the Humura Center in the city of Gitega, but the government has not reported to have helped any known victims of trafficking. In January 2010, police rescued three child sex trafficking victims from a brothel in Bujumbura, documented their testimonies, and returned them to their families. In 2009, government officials identified 18 trafficking victims, 10 of whom were victims of forced prostitution and eight of whom were victims of forced labor. In January 2010, Burundi's Interpol office assisted the government in repatriating a 15-year-old Burundian boy from Rwanda where he was forced to work as a domestic servant. In cooperation with Tanzanian police, the government repatriated six Burundian child trafficking victims from Tanzania in July 2009. Between April and June, the National Commission for Disarmament, Demobilization, and Reintegration oversaw the demobilization and short-term care of the final 380 child soldiers from the Forces Nationale de Libération (FNL) rebel group and from among alleged FNL dissidents in the Randa and Buramata sites. With outside funding, the Commission's staff provided medical screening, psychosocial counseling, and sensitization on peaceful cohabitation, while conducting family tracing; the children were reunited with their families in July 2009. In 2016, a law passed that provides victims and witnesses protection and safety from prosecution for the acts committed while being trafficked. The law required a unit to be developed in the Ministry of Justice, but it was never formed. However, the law did allow victims other legal ways of staying in Burundi if they do not wish to go back to other countries.

In October 2009, the government established a Municipal Council for Children and Youth (CMEJ) to assist at-risk youth and develop a transit center for victims of human trafficking, demobilized child soldiers, and street children. The CMEJ began drafting an action plan in March 2010 and sought the necessary international funding to become fully operational. The government has not developed a system for proactively identifying trafficking victims among vulnerable populations or a referral process to transfer such trafficking victims to organizations providing services. While police interviewed child victims during the investigations of their abusers, the prosecutor's office did not pursue the possibility of child victims' participation in prosecutions of trafficking offenders. The government did not inappropriately incarcerate or otherwise penalize victims for unlawful acts committed as a direct result of being trafficked.

== Prevention ==
In February 2010, the Commander of the Women and Children's Brigade began a tour of the country to sensitize local government officials and inform local populations on the danger of human trafficking. In 2009, the Ministry of Labor sponsored eight workshops for teachers, magistrates, communal administrators, and agricultural workers to raise awareness of the dangers of child labor and trafficking. In partnerships with the ILO and UNICEF, the government also conducted a sensitization campaign in several provinces to warn against child trafficking for forced labor and abusing former child soldiers, centered on the World Day Against Child Labour in June. The Ministry of Labor's 12 inspectors conducted no child labor inspections in 2009. The government, historically, has failed to undertake efforts to reduce demand for commercial sex acts. The pre-deployment anti-trafficking training for Burundian peacekeepers, provided by a foreign government, included a curriculum that created awareness and discouraged acts of trafficking and sexual exploitation.

During the 2021 reporting period the government was commended for its efforts to increase training for officials so they can spot the signs of trafficking and know how to handle cases involving trafficking. However, the government decided not to fund the anti-trafficking committee, so it ran on volunteer service. The government also increased its communication and cooperation with other countries to prevent and prosecute trafficking. The government also relied on other organizations and countries to provide funding or prevention training. In July 2019, the IOM partnered with the government of Burundi to launch a 3-year project to combat human trafficking. The Kingdom of the Netherlands funded $3 million (USD) and it continues until 2022.

In some cultures in Burundi, it is expected of women and young girls to dress nicely and keep clean. However, many girls will do this to avoid being trafficked or sexually assaulted. Many do this with the belief that if they look like they have a stable and caring family, that traffickers will avoid them because they don't want family members calling the police or coming after them.

== See also ==
- Human rights in Burundi
