= Pié Masumbuko =

Burundian politician (1931–2026)

Pié Masumbuko (29 September 1931 – 26 July 2026) was a Burundian politician and physician who was a member of the Union for National Progress and the acting Prime Minister of Burundi from 15 to 26 January 1965.

Masumbuko represented the nation of Burundi in signing the Partial Test Ban Treaty on 4 October 1963.

== Early life and education ==
Pié Masumbuko was born on 29 September 1931 in Rukiga, Kiganda commune, Muramvya Province, Rwanda-Urundi. He was ethnically Tutsi. From 1939 until 1943 he was educated in primary schools in Bukeye and Kiganda. He then received a secondary education and training as a medical assistant at the Groupe Scolaire de Astrida. He subsequently attended Lovanium University in the Belgian Congo and in 1958 enrolled at the University of Paris to study medicine and political science on scholarship. He graduated in 1961, thus becoming the first African in Rwanda-Urundi to have earned a degree in medicine.

== Political career ==
Masumbuko was a member of the Union for National Progress (UPRONA). In 1963 he became Vice Prime Minister and Minister of Health of Burundi under Prime Minister Pierre Ngendandumwe. In that role he helped secure diplomatic relations between Burundi and the People's Republic of China. He also helped to move supplies from Burundi to Simba rebels in the eastern Democratic Republic of the Congo and signed a cooperation agreement between Burundi and the World Health Organization (WHO). In 1963 he was arrested on the orders of Prime Minister André Muhirwa for plotting against the government, but was soon thereafter released upon the intervention of Mwami Mwambutsa IV. Shortly thereafter, the National Assembly appointed him to the Mwami's Crown Council on 22 May. In January 1964 he became the permanent secretary of UPRONA. That year he was appointed Minister of Health under Prime Minister Albin Nyamoya.

In early January 1965 Nyamoya was dismissed by Mwambutsa, who asked Ngendandumwe to form a new government. Ngendandumwe was assassinated on 15 January, the day his government was announced. Masumbuko then served as acting Prime Minister of Burundi from then until he was succeeded by Joseph Bamina on 26 January. He served as Vice Prime Minister and Minister of Health under Bamina. That September a new government led by Léopold Biha came to power and he retained the health portfolio. For a time he served on the Mwami's Crown Council.

Following a coup in 1966, Masumbuko was appointed Minister of Foreign Affairs on 12 July by Mwami Ntare V. The Mwami came increasingly into conflict with the government, and in September attempted to force Masumbuko to resign after a tract circulated accusing him of corruption. As a compromise, on 16 September he relinquished his foreign affairs portfolio and became Minister of Social Affairs. In early April 1967 President Michel Micombero appointed him roving ambassador. He was arrested by the regime on 6 July for allegedly contacting Congolese rebels to plot against the government and eventually released on 28 November. He was detained again on 16 January 1971.

== Public health ==
In September 1973 Masumbuko went to France to receive specialised training from the WHO. After one and a half years of study he was appointed WHO Representative in Chad. He held the post until 1976, and then in 1985 became WHO Representative in Republic of Côte d'Ivoire, serving in that capacity until 1992. He remained in the country after the end of his tenure. He died on 26 July 2026 at his home in Abidjan.

== Death ==
Masumbuko died on 26 July 2026, at the age of 94.

== Works cited ==
- "Le Burundi a la Recherche d'Une Stabilite". Présence Africaine (in French) (47): 235–241. 1963. JSTOR 24348312.
- Eggers, Ellen K. (2006). Historical Dictionary of Burundi (third ed.). Lanham: Scarecrow Press. ISBN 978-0-8108-5302-7.
- Lemarchand, René (1970). Rwanda and Burundi. New York: Praeger Publishers. OCLC 254366212.
- Weinstein, Warren (1976). Historical Dictionary of Burundi. Metuchen: Scarecrow Press. ISBN 9780810809628.

Political offices
Preceded by Pierre Ngendandumwe	Prime Minister of Burundi; 1965	Succeeded by Joseph Bamina
