= Pierre Mpozenzi =

Burundian politician

Pierre Mpozenzi (born c. 1937) was a Burundian politician. He served as Vice Prime Minister of Burundi from April 1964 to June 1965.

== Early life ==
Pierre Mpozenzi was born in about 1937. A member of the Abajiji clan, he was ethnically Hutu. Educated in agriculture at the Groupe Scolaire d'Astrida, he later became Provincial Administrator of Bujumbura Province.

== Political career ==
Mpozenzi had close relations with the Mwami of Burundi, Mwambutsa IV of Burundi, and was one of the few Hutus who aligned with the Casablanca faction in the Burundian National Assembly. He served as a division director in the Ministry of Agriculture from March 1962 until mid-1963, when he was appointed Governor of Ruyigi Province. From 1963 until April 1964 he served as the Master of Ceremonies for the Royal Court. In April 1964 he became Vice Prime Minister and Minister Interior of Burundi under Prime Minister Albin Nyamoya. In August he declared that all persons who sought to aid Prime Minister Moïse Tshombe of the Democratic Republic of the Congo would be barred from Burundi. Mpozenzi was dismissed from the vice premiership in June 1965 but remained Minister of Interior until he was replaced in October. The following month he was made Minister of Economy, and held the position until July 1966. On 14 November 1967 President Michel Micombero appointed him Minister of Interior.

== Works cited ==
- Cola Alberich, Julio (1964). "Discordia en torno al Congo". Revista de Política Internacional (in Spanish) (75): 151–162. ISSN 0034-8716.
- Chrétien, Jean-Pierre; Dupaquier, Jean-François (2007). Burundi 1972, au bord des génocides (in French). Paris: Karthala Editions. ISBN 9782845868724.
- Russell, Aiden (2019). Politics and Violence in Burundi: The Language of Truth in an Emerging State. Cambridge University Press. ISBN 9781108499347.
- Weinstein, Warren (1976). Historical Dictionary of Burundi. Metuchen: Scarecrow Press. ISBN 978-0-8108-0962-8.
