= LGBTQ rights in Burundi =

- Burundi
- Legal status: Illegal since 2009
- Penalty: 3 months to 2 years imprisonment and fines
- Gender identity: No
- Military: No
- Discrimination protections: None

Family rights
- Recognition of relationships: No recognition of same-sex unions
- Restrictions: Same-sex marriage banned constitutionally since 2005
- Adoption: No

Lesbian, gay, bisexual, transgender, and queer (LGBTQ) people in Burundi face legal challenges not experienced by non-LGBTQ citizens. While never criminalized before 22 April 2009, Burundi has since criminalized same-sex sexual activity by both men and women with a penalty up to two years in prison and a fine. LGBTQ persons are regularly prosecuted and persecuted by the government and additionally face stigmatisation among the broader population.

== Legality of same-sex sexual activity ==
According to an unofficial English translation of Article 567 of the Burundi Penal Code, a person who has sexual relations with someone of the same sex may be punished with imprisonment for three months to two years and a fine of 50,000 to 100,000 francs. (Note: The official text of Article 567 in French ("Burundi: Senate Upholds Human Rights Principles", International Gay & Lesbian Human Rights Commission, 20 February 2009): Quiconque fait des relations sexuelles avec la personne de même sexe est puni d’une servitude pénale de trois mois à deux ans et d’une amende de cinquante mille francs à cent mille francs ou d’une de ces peines seulement.) The Penal Code passed in November 22, 2008, and took effect on 22 April 2009.

On 1 July 2009, a young man was arrested for allegedly committing sexual violence against a club patron in Bujumbura. The police later stated the man was arrested for being gay but offered to release the suspect in exchange for money. Advocacy by human rights NGOs and the LGBTQ community helped secure his release from police custody. In 2012, two lesbians were briefly arrested and subsequently released. In September 2014, a Vietnamese employee of the telephone company Viettel was caught in sexual relations with a Burundian man in Karuzi Province. The Burundian man alleged that it was non-consensual sex, and the Vietnamese man was detained. Authorities dropped the case after three days for lack of evidence. On 2 November 2016, the High Court of Cibitoke Province sentenced a 15-year-old boy who admitted to the rape of a seven-year-old boy to one year in prison. The adolescent was charged with rape of a minor and homosexuality.

In December 2023, President Évariste Ndayishimiye said that gay sex is like "choos[ing] Satan" and that the death penalty is morally (if not legally) appropriate. He said: "For me, I think that if we find these people in Burundi they should be taken to stadiums and be stoned, and doing so would not be a crime."

== Recognition of same-sex relationships ==
Burundi does not recognise same-sex marriage and civil unions. Article 29 of the Burundi Constitution bans same-sex marriage. (Note: The official text of Article 29 in French (Constitution Interimaire Post-Transition de la Republique du Burundi): La liberté de se marier est garantie, de même que le droit de choisir son ou sa partenaire. Le mariage ne peut être conclu qu’avec le libre et plein consentement des futurs époux. Le mariage entre deux personnes de même sexe est interdit.)

== Adoption and family planning ==
According to a website of the French government, single and married people are eligible to adopt children. The website does not say whether single LGBTQ people are disqualified or not.

== Living conditions ==
The U.S. Department of State's Country Reports on Human Rights Practices for 2016 stated that:

Acts of Violence, Discrimination, and Other Abuses Based on Sexual Orientation and Gender Identity
The law criminalizes same-sex sexual acts with penalties ranging from fines to imprisonment of three months to two years. According to Burundi Africa Generation News, on 2 November, the High Court of Cibitoke Province sentenced a 15-year-old boy who admitted to the rape of a seven-year-old boy to one year in prison. The adolescent was charged with rape of a minor and homosexuality. There were no other reports of prosecution for homosexuality during the year. The Remuruka Center in Bujumbura offered urgent services to the LGBTI community. The government neither supported nor hindered the activities of local LGBTI organizations or the center.

== Summary table ==
Same-sex sexual activity legal.	No (Penalty: Up to 2 years imprisonment)
Equal age of consent	No
Anti-discrimination laws in employment only	No
Anti-discrimination laws in the provision of goods and services	No
Anti-discrimination laws in all other areas (Incl. indirect discrimination, hate speech)	No
Same-sex marriages	No (Constitutional ban since 2005)
Recognition of same-sex couples	No
Step-child adoption by same-sex couples	No
Joint adoption by same-sex couples	No
Gays and lesbians allowed to serve openly in the military	No
Right to change legal gender	No
Access to IVF for lesbians	No
Commercial surrogacy for gay male couples	No
MSMs allowed to donate blood	No

== See also ==
- Human rights in Burundi
- LGBTQ rights in Africa
