= Yaoundé Convention =

1963 & 1969 conventions between the EEC and AASM

The Yaoundé Convention was a convention signed in the city of Yaoundé, Cameroon between the European Economic Community (EEC) and the AASM (Associated African States and Madagascar) in 1963 (ASMM (African States, Madagascar and Mauritius) in 1969 respectively).

== The First Convention (1964–1969) ==
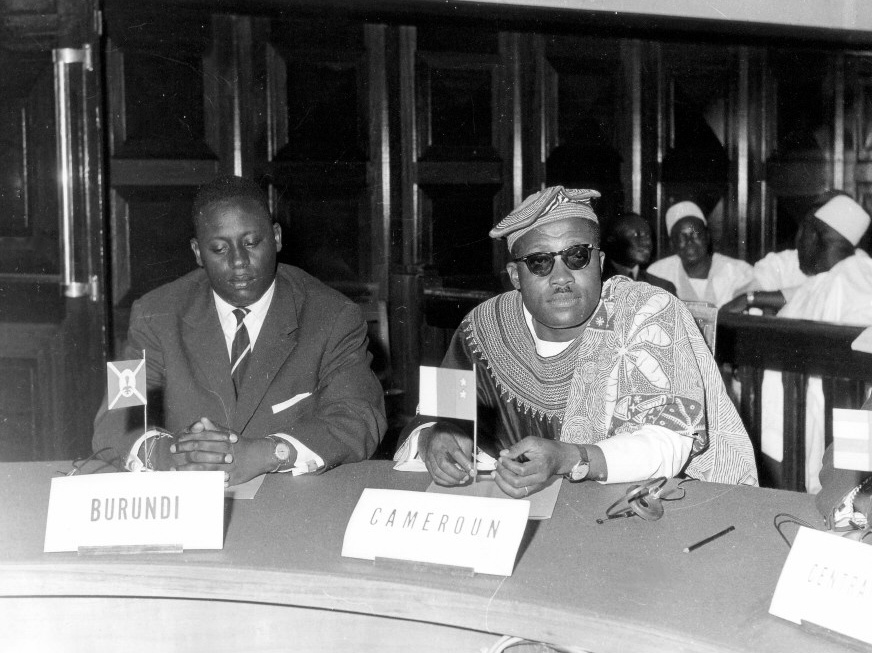
Burundian Minister for Foreign Affairs Lorgio Nimubona and Cameroonian Minister for National Economy Victor Kanga at the signing of the Yaoundé I Convention, 1963

The first association agreement between the EEC and the 18 African ex-colonies that had recently gained independence, was signed in Yaoundé on 20 July 1963 and entered into force on 1 June 1964. It was mainly based on the previous treaty between the EEC and its overseas territories and had a validity period of 5 years.

== The Second Convention (1971–1975) ==
After the first treaty expired, a new one was signed on 29 July 1969. It later entered into force on 1 January 1971, with Madagascar and Mauritius becoming the 19th African states to take part in the convention. There was a tight link between the ASMM and the African Great Lakes countries of Kenya, Uganda and Tanzania. The EEC therefore wanted the Arusha Agreement with the three nations to enter into force on the same date as the Second Yaoundé Convention. Both agreements ended and constituted the basis for the broader Lomé Convention of 1975.

== See also ==
- African and Malagasy Union
