= Antoine Nduwayo =

Tutsi Burundian politician

6th Prime Minister of Burundi
- In office 22 February 1995 – 31 July 1996
- President: Sylvestre Ntibantunganya
- Preceded by: Anatole Kanyenkiko
- Succeeded by: Pascal-Firmin Ndimira

Personal details
- Born: 1942 (age 83–84)

Antoine Nduwayo (born 1942) was the Prime Minister of Burundi from 22 February 1995, until 31 July 1996. Nduwayo is an ethnic Tutsi.

== Political career ==
Antoine Nduwayo became the executive secretary of the Economic Community of the Great Lakes Countries (CEPGL).

Prime Minister Anatole Kanyenkiko resigned on 15 February 1995. He had held office from 7 February 1994, and was a member of the Union pour le progrès national (UPRONA). Kanyenkinko was forced to resign by UPRONA hard-liners, who were calling to overthrow the Government.

UPRONA's seven smaller allies rejected UPRONA's candidate, Aster Girukwigomba, former Minister of Commerce. They proposed Antoine Nduwayo, who was accepted by UPRONA. Bujumbura returned to relative calm after Nduwayo was nominated. He was appointed Prime Minister of Burundi by the Hutu President Sylvestre Ntibantunganya on 22 February 1995. The more radical Tutsi micro-parties took four portfolios from UPRONA during the reorganization.

Antoine Nduwayo was appointed at a time when armed Hutu and Tutsi extremists were organizing to resist power-sharing arrangements between the Hutu and Tutsi politicians. Violence escalated in 1995 and early 1996. In the government reshuffle on 12 October 1995, FRODEBU and its allies were reduced to 11 of the 26 ministerial portfolios. By May 1996, there were military governors in the provinces of Bubanza, Karuzi, Kayanza, Muyinga and Ngozi.

The Organization of African Unity (OAU) met in Arusha, Tanzania, in July 1996, led by Julius Nyerere, former president of Tanzania. He had promised that "East African troops will, if necessary, intervene in Burundi in an attempt to stop the ethnic massacres." Under pressure, Prime Minister Nduwayo and President Sylvester Ntibantunganya accepted security assistance. This triggered protests against the government.

The Burundian army repeatedly threatened Nduwayo, who reneged on allowing foreign intervention. On 24 July 1996 Nduwayo's UPRONA withdrew from its coalition with FRODEBU and the power-sharing government of 1993 collapsed. On 25 July 1996 Pierre Buyoya, a Tutsi military strongman, former president and UPRONA leader, overthrew Ntibantunganya in a bloodless putsch. Nduwayo resigned shortly after the coup, and was succeeded by Pascal-Firmin Ndimira of UPRONA, who held office from 31 July 1996 to 12 June 1998.

== Later career ==
After leaving office, Nduwayo was appointed Director-General of the Caisse de Mobilization et de Financement (CAMOFI). It collapsed in November 1998 with debts that were more than five times its equity. Nduwayo went on to run the Banque de commerce et de développement (BCD) when it was created on 14 January 1999. Nduwayo's appointment after leading CAMOFI into bankruptcy, which contravened the banking law, showed the weakness of the central bank in upholding the law against powerful politicians.

In May 2001 Antoine Nduwayo and Edouard Nzambimana were among a 22-member delegation from Burundi, including army, civil society and religious leaders, who flew to South Africa to meet with Nelson Mandela, who was the main mediator in the Burundi crisis.

As with CAMOFI, BCD was very poorly managed. The central bank put BCD under receivership on 23 March 2004, after ignoring warning of serious problems for a long period. By the time of its failure the bank could only continue operating if it could raise 7.5 billion BIF through recapitalization, loan recovery and sale of assets. This would be impossible given the bank's poor reputation.

In April 2017 Antoine Nduwayo accompanied a group of young people from Burundi to the Kigali Genocide Memorial in Rwanda. He said it was important for Burundians to learn from Rwanda's history, and to make sure the political tensions in Burundi at that time did not lead to genocide.

In October 2020 the Supreme Court of Burundi sentenced 15 former senior officials of Burundi to life imprisonment and fines for their involvement in the assassination of President Melchior Ndadaye in October 1993. They included former president Pierre Buyoya and former first Vice-President, Bernard Busokoza. Antoine Nduwayo was the only one among the accused who was acquitted. In November 2020 Pierre Buyoya resigned from his position as High Representative of the African Union in Mali and the Sahel, which he had held for eight years. He remained in Mali.

== Sources ==
- 1995 CIA World Factbook, United States Central Intelligence Agency, June 1996
- Burundi Constitutional Background, ICL
- Burundi: Delegation Leaves for Pretoria, Dakar: Panafrican News Agency, 3 May 2001
- "Burundi, dirigeants politiques", Perspective Monde (in French)
- Frilet, Alain (21 February 1995), "L'opposition burundaise désigne son candidat au poste de Premier ministre", Liberation
- Lunn, Jon (25 October 2006), The African Great Lakes Region: An End to Conflict? (PDF), House of Commons Libnrary
- Nkurunziza, Janvier D.; Ndikumana, Léonce; Nyamoya, Prime (June 2010), The Financial Sector in Burundi (PDF), NBER Africa Project
- "Pierre Buyoya jette l'éponge, le régime burundais exulte", Burundi Daily (in French), 27 November 2020
- "Regional Leaders To Impose Sanctions On Burundi", AllAfrica, 8 August 1996
- Report of the Special Rapporteur on his mission to Burundi from 19 to 29 April 1995, United Nations Commission on Human Rights
- Reyntjens, Filip; Vandeginste, Stef (1997), "BURUNDI. ÉVOLUTION POLITIQUE EN 1996-1997" (PDF), L'AFRIQUE DES GRANDS LACS. ANNUAIRE 1996-1997 (in French), University of Antwerp
- Seymour, Vernon (September 1996), BURUNDI AND THE FUTURE OF HUMANITARIAN INTERVENTION], archived from the original on 2010-04-04
- Un apartheid qui ne dit pas son nom (PDF), Bujumbura: FRODEBU, August 1997
- Young Burundians visit Kigali Memorial to learn about the Genocide against the Tutsi, KGM, 19 April 2017
