= François Ngeze =

Burundian politician

President of Burundi
- Acting
- In office 21 October 1993 – 27 October 1993
- Preceded by: Melchior Ndadaye
- Succeeded by: Sylvie Kinigi (acting)

Personal details
- Born: 1953 (age 71–72)
- Political party: UPRONA

François Ngeze (born 1953) is a Burundian retired politician. He served as the acting head of state of Burundi from 21 October 1993 to 27 October 1993. He was chosen by the military Committee of Public Salvation, a group of army officers that staged the 1993 Burundian coup d'état attempt overthrew the democratically elected government of president Melchior Ndadaye (who was killed during the coup attempt).

Ngeze, one of the few prominent Hutu members of UPRONA (Union for National Progress) at the time, was interior minister in the government of Pierre Buyoya, who was defeated by Ndadaye in elections held on 1 June 1993.

Following widespread condemnation of the coup, the Committee of Public Salvation was dissolved on 27 October. Sylvie Kinigi, prime minister in the Ndadaye government, took over as acting president.

== Early life ==
François Ngeze was born in 1953 in Isare commune, Rutegama colline, Ruanda-Urundi. Ethnically, he is Hutu. In May 1972 the Burundian regime engaged in anti-Hutu repression, including massive violence. Ngeze was student at the time in Burengo and was arrested by the authorities and imprisoned at Kayanza. By his own account government administrator Basile Gateretse—a friend of his father—released him from prison and hid him in his home for two weeks with his cousin, Cyprien Ntaryamira. Once the authorities became suspicious, Gateretse arranged for the two of them to flee across the Ruzizi River into Zaire. Ngeze then went to Rwanda. He earned a university degree in pedagogy and became a teacher at Saint Léon Minor Seminary of Kabgayi. He married and fathered six children.

== Political career ==
Ngeze returned to Burundi in 1982. He joined the Union for National Progress (French: Union pour le Progrès national, UPRONA) and became permanent secretary of the party chapter in Bujumbura. He rose to become Governor of Cankuzo Province in 1989 and later Governor of Bujumbura Rural Province. On 4 April 1992 he was sworn-in with a new national cabinet as Minister of Interior, becoming the first Hutu to hold the post since two decades prior.

== Works cited ==
- Chrétien, Jean-Pierre; Dupaquier, Jean-François (2007). Burundi 1972, au bord des génocides (in French). Paris: Karthala Editions. ISBN 9782845868724.

Political offices
Preceded by Melchior Ndadaye	President of Burundi; Acting; 1993	Succeeded by Sylvie Kinigi; Acting
