= Prime Minister of Burundi =

Head of government

- Umushikiranganji wa Mbere w'Uburundi (Kirundi); Premier Ministre du Burundi (French); Waziri Mkuu wa Burundi (Swahili)
- Coat of arms of Burundi

- Flag of Burundi
- Incumbent; Nestor Ntahontuye since 5 August 2025
- Style: His Excellency (formal); Mr. Prime Minister (informal)
- Status: Head of government
- Member of: Council of Ministers
- Appointer: The King (1961–1966); The President (1966–1998, 2020–present)
- Term length: At the president's pleasure, contingent on the officeholder's ability to command parliamentary confidence
- Constituting instrument: Constitution of Burundi (2005); Amended Constitution of Burundi (2018)
- Precursor: 1st & 2nd vice-presidents
- Formation: 26 January 1961; 65 years ago 24 June 2020; 6 years ago (reinstated)
- First holder: Joseph Cimpaye
- Abolished: 12 June 1998 – 24 June 2020
- Website: Official website

This article lists the prime ministers of Burundi since the formation of the post of Prime Minister of Burundi in 1961 until the present day. The office of prime minister was most recently abolished in 1998, and reinstated in 2020 with the appointment of Alain-Guillaume Bunyoni.

Counting both the Kingdom and Republic periods, a total of sixteen people have served in the office (not counting one acting prime minister). Additionally, two people, Pierre Ngendandumwe and Albin Nyamoya, served on two non-consecutive occasions. The current prime minister is Nestor Ntahontuye, since 5 August 2025.

== List of officeholders ==
Political parties

Union of People's Parties (UPP)
Union for National Progress (UPRONA)
National Council for the Defense of Democracy – Forces for the Defense of Democracy (CNDD–FDD)

Other factions

Military

Status

Denotes acting prime minister

=== Prime ministers of the Kingdom of Burundi ===
No.	Portrait	Name (Birth–Death)	Term of office			Ethnic group	Political party	King(s) (Reign)
No.	Portrait	Name (Birth–Death)	Took office	Left office	Time in office	Ethnic group	Political party	King(s) (Reign)
Part of Ruanda-Urundi								Mwambutsa IV (1915–1966)
1		Joseph Cimpaye (1932–1972)	26 January 1961	28 September 1961	245 days	Hutu	UPP	Mwambutsa IV (1915–1966)
2		Louis Rwagasore (1932–1961)	28 September 1961	13 October 1961 (assassinated.)	15 days	Tutsi	UPRONA	Mwambutsa IV (1915–1966)
3		André Muhirwa (1920–2003)	20 October 1961	1 July 1962	254 days	Tutsi	UPRONA	Mwambutsa IV (1915–1966)
Independent country								Mwambutsa IV (1915–1966)
(3)		André Muhirwa (1920–2003)	1 July 1962	10 June 1963	344 days	Tutsi	UPRONA	Mwambutsa IV (1915–1966)
4		Pierre Ngendandumwe (1930–1965)	18 June 1963	6 April 1964	293 days	Hutu	UPRONA	Mwambutsa IV (1915–1966)
5		Albin Nyamoya (1924–2001)	6 April 1964	7 January 1965	276 days	Tutsi	UPRONA	Mwambutsa IV (1915–1966)
(4)		Pierre Ngendandumwe (1930–1965)	7 January 1965	15 January 1965 (assassinated.)	8 days	Hutu	UPRONA	Mwambutsa IV (1915–1966)
–		Pié Masumbuko (1931–2026)	15 January 1965	26 January 1965	11 days	Tutsi	UPRONA	Mwambutsa IV (1915–1966)
6		Joseph Bamina (1925–1965)	26 January 1965	30 September 1965	247 days	Hutu	UPRONA	Mwambutsa IV (1915–1966)
7		Léopold Biha (1919–2003) (Note: Served at the time of the 1965 coup attempt.)	13 October 1965	8 July 1966 (deposed.)	268 days	Tutsi	UPRONA	Mwambutsa IV (1915–1966)
8		Michel Micombero (1940–1983)	11 July 1966	28 November 1966 (become President.)	140 days	Tutsi	Military / UPRONA	Ntare V (1966)

=== Prime ministers of the Republic of Burundi ===
No.	Portrait	Name (Birth–Death)	Term of office			Ethnic group	Political party	President(s) (Term)
No.	Portrait	Name (Birth–Death)	Took office	Left office	Time in office	Ethnic group	Political party	President(s) (Term)
Post abolished (28 November 1966 – 15 July 1972)
1		Albin Nyamoya (1924–2001)	15 July 1972	5 June 1973	325 days	Tutsi	UPRONA	Michel Micombero (1966–1976)
Post abolished (5 June 1973 – 12 November 1976)
2		Édouard Nzambimana (1945–2015)	12 November 1976	13 October 1978	1 year, 335 days	Tutsi	UPRONA	Jean-Baptiste Bagaza (1976–1987)
Post abolished (13 October 1978 – 19 October 1988)
3		Adrien Sibomana (born 1953)	19 October 1988	10 July 1993	4 years, 264 days	Hutu	UPRONA	Pierre Buyoya (1987–1993)
4		Sylvie Kinigi (born 1953)	10 July 1993	7 February 1994	212 days	Tutsi	UPRONA	Melchior Ndadaye (1993)
4		Sylvie Kinigi (born 1953)	10 July 1993	7 February 1994	212 days	Tutsi	UPRONA	Herself (1993–1994)
4		Sylvie Kinigi (born 1953)	10 July 1993	7 February 1994	212 days	Tutsi	UPRONA	Cyprien Ntaryamira (1994)
5		Anatole Kanyenkiko (born 1952)	7 February 1994	22 February 1995	1 year, 15 days	Tutsi	UPRONA	Cyprien Ntaryamira (1994)
5		Anatole Kanyenkiko (born 1952)	7 February 1994	22 February 1995	1 year, 15 days	Tutsi	UPRONA	Sylvestre Ntibantunganya (1994–1996)
6		Antoine Nduwayo (born 1942)	22 February 1995	31 July 1996 (Note: Resigned following the 1996 coup d'état.)	1 year, 160 days	Tutsi	UPRONA	Sylvestre Ntibantunganya (1994–1996)
7		Pascal-Firmin Ndimira (born 1956)	31 July 1996	12 June 1998	1 year, 316 days	Hutu	UPRONA	Pierre Buyoya (1996–2003)
Post abolished (12 June 1998 – 24 June 2020)
8		Alain-Guillaume Bunyoni (born 1972)	24 June 2020	7 September 2022	2 years, 75 days	Hutu	CNDD–FDD	Évariste Ndayishimiye (2020–present)
9		Gervais Ndirakobuca (born 1970)	7 September 2022	5 August 2025	2 years, 332 days	Hutu	CNDD–FDD	Évariste Ndayishimiye (2020–present)
10		Nestor Ntahontuye (born 1978)	5 August 2025	Incumbent	1 year, 33 days	Hutu	CNDD–FDD	Évariste Ndayishimiye (2020–present)

== See also ==
- Politics of Burundi
- List of kings of Burundi
- President of Burundi
  - List of presidents of Burundi
- Vice-President of Burundi
- List of colonial governors of Ruanda-Urundi
  - List of colonial residents of Burundi
