= Prostitution in Uganda =

Prostitution in Uganda is illegal according to Uganda's 1950 Penal Code, but is widespread despite this. Many turn to prostitution because of poverty and lack of other opportunities. A study of Kampala teachers in 2008 showed that teachers were turning to prostitution to increase their income. A sex worker can earn around USh.1.5 million/= (£439 sterling) per month, whereas this would be a yearly wage for a secondary school teacher. There are many Kenyan prostitutes in the country.

Sex trafficking, HIV, and child prostitution are problems in the country. In 2017, the Uganda AIDS Commission (UAC), estimated that 570 women and girls aged between 15 and 24 contract HIV infections every week, an average of more than 81 daily.

== Overview ==
In 2003, Ugandan authorities ordered sex workers to pay a tax of USh.9,000/= (£2.63 stg) in order to operate in Malaba. Also in 2003 Ugandan MPs met sex workers who were concerned about "police harassment" and claiming that it was unfair that police officers were arresting sex workers while they (sex workers) waited for clients.

Prostitutes operate in Kampala city centre. Ahead of the 2007 CHOGM Conference in the city, the prostitutes were moved out of the city centre to designated zones in the suburbs.

Violence erupted in Kampala in 2016 between Ugandan and Kenyan prostitutes. The Kenyan prostitutes were charging a low price, and the Ugandans were angry that the Kenyans were taking all their trade. Local leaders intervened to stop the fighting, and the Kenyans agreed to charge the same price as the Ugandans. Two Kenyans were injured. In an attempt to stop the influx of Kenyan prostitutes, the authorities planned to charge a registration fee.

With 6,000 construction workers building the new Hydroelectric Power Station fuelling demand, there are many prostitutes in the Karuma area.

Lyantonde is a truck-stop town and the main stop-over on the main highway from Kampala to Kigali, the capital city of Rwanda. There are many prostitutes in the town to service the truck drivers needs. The area has the highest rate of HIV in the country, nearly twice the national average.

== HIV ==
Uganda is in the top 10 of countries with the highest HIV prevalence rates. Sex workers are a high risk group. In 2013 they had a 34.2 percent prevalence rate. Even in Kampala, where HIV infection is the highest in the country, clients are reluctant to use condoms and will offer many times the usual rate for unprotected sex.

== Sex trafficking ==
Uganda is a source, transit, and destination country for women, and children subjected to sex trafficking. Ugandan girls and boys are exploited in prostitution. Recruiters target girls and women aged 13–24 years for domestic sex trafficking, especially near sports tournaments and road construction projects. An international organisation reported that most internal trafficking victims are Ugandans.

During the reporting period, Ugandan victims were identified in neighboring countries, including Kenya, South Sudan, and the DRC. Children from the DRC, Rwanda, Burundi, Kenya, Tanzania, and South Sudan are exploited in prostitution in Uganda. South Sudanese children in refugee settlements in northern Uganda are vulnerable to trafficking.

Young women remained the most vulnerable to transnational trafficking, usually seeking employment as domestic workers in the Middle East; at times Ugandan women were fraudulently recruited for employment and then exploited in forced prostitution. Ugandan migrant workers are subjected to sex trafficking in United Arab Emirates (UAE), Saudi Arabia, Oman, Qatar, Kuwait, Iraq, Iran, Egypt, Turkey, and Algeria. Despite the government's complete ban in 2016 on Ugandans’ travel abroad for domestic work, some licensed and unlicensed agencies circumvented this ban by sending Ugandans through Kenya and Tanzania. Traffickers, who appear to be increasingly organized, are frequently relatives or friends of victims, or may pose as wealthy women or labor recruiters promising vulnerable Ugandans well-paid jobs abroad or in Uganda's metropolitan areas. Some traffickers threatened to harm the victims’ family or confiscated travel documents.

The United States Department of State Office to Monitor and Combat Trafficking in Persons ranks Uganda as a 'Tier 2' country.

== See also ==
- Sex for fish
