= Pascal-Firmin Ndimira =

Hutu Burundian politician

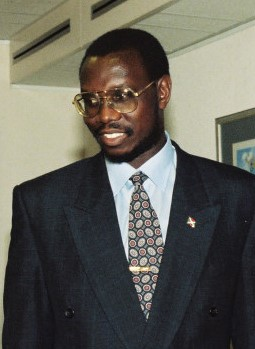
Pascal-Firmin Ndimira in 1996

Pascal-Firmin Ndimira (born 9 April 1956) was Prime Minister of Burundi from 31 July 1996 until 12 June 1998, when the post was abolished.

Ndimira, an ethnic Hutu from Ngozi province, is a member of the Union for National Progress (UPRONA) party. He was born in Muyinga.

Political offices
Preceded by Antoine Nduwayo	Prime Minister of Burundi; 1996–1998	Succeeded by Position abolished (1998–2020)
