= Ethnic groups in Burundi =

Ethnic groups in Burundi include the three main indigenous groups of Hutu, Tutsi and Twa that have largely been emphasized in the study of the country's history due to their role in shaping it through conflict and consolidation. Burundi's ethnic make-up is similar to that of neighboring Rwanda. Additionally, recent immigration has also contributed to Burundi's ethnic diversity. Throughout the country's history, the relation between the ethnic groups has varied, largely depending on internal political, economic and social factors and also external factors such as colonialism. The pre-colonial era, despite having divisions between the three groups, saw greater ethnic cohesion and fluidity dependent on socioeconomic factors. During the colonial period under German and then Belgian rule, ethnic groups in Burundi experienced greater stratifications and solidification through biological arguments separating the groups and indirect colonial rule that increased group tensions. The post-independence Burundi has experienced recurring inter-ethnic violence especially in the political arena that has, in turn, spilled over to society at large leading to many casualties throughout the decades. The Arusha Agreement served to end the decades-long ethnic tensions, and the Burundian government has stated commitment to creating ethnic cohesion in the country since, yet recent waves of violence and controversies under the Pierre Nkurunziza leadership have worried some experts of potential resurfacing of ethnic violence. Given the changing nature of ethnicity and ethnic relations in the country, many scholars have approached the topic theoretically to come up with primordial, constructivist and mixed arguments or explanations on ethnicity in Burundi.

Ethnicity in Burundi (2020)
1. Hutus (85.0%)
2. Tutsis (14.0%)
3. Twa (1.00%)

== Indigenous population ==
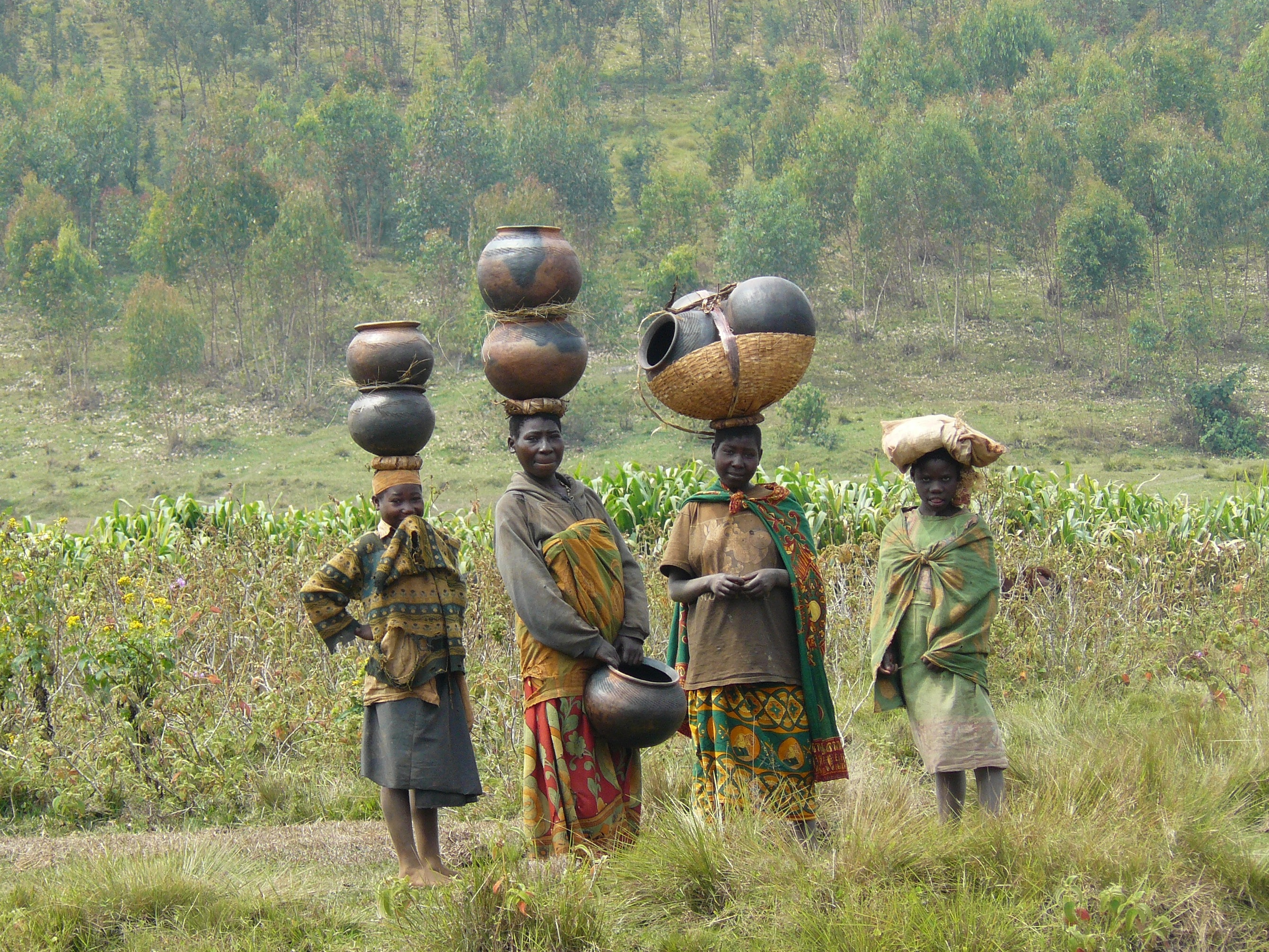
Twa women in Burundi

Native Burundians belong to one of the three major ethnic groups in Burundi: the Hutu, Tutsi, and Twa peoples. The historical origins of ethnic differentiation between Hutu and Tutsi are disputed, however members of both groups consider themselves distinct. The relations between the indigenous ethnic groups in Burundi have greatly varied depending on the historical context or era. Generally, the distinctions have always existed, yet at certain periods they have produced greater violence than others. The ethnic dynamics between Hutus and Tutsis have especially shaped Burundian history and politics and have become a major object of study by scholars. Today, the Hutu are the largest ethnic group in Burundi, representing approximately 85 percent of Burundians. Under Colonial rule and then Burundi's Tutsi-dominated postcolonial government between 1965 and 2001, the Hutu population was marginalized and subordinated to the Tutsi elites. Since the end of the Burundian Civil War (1993–2005), however, Hutus have been dominant in political life. The Tutsi represent approximately 14 percent of the national population. Historically, the Tutsi dominated political institutions in Burundi, including the nation's monarchy, then their favoritism by colonial governments, and even after independence, the subsequent dictatorial regimes of Michel Micombero (1966–76), Jean-Baptiste Bagaza (1976–87), and Pierre Buyoya (1987–93) were dominated by Tutsi elites which often discriminated against the Hutu majority. The Twa make up around 1 percent of Burundi's population. As an ethnic group, they have links to the pygmy peoples of the Democratic Republic of the Congo. Nowadays, they often work as unskilled laborers. The Twa have historically been economically and politically marginalized by the other two ethnic groups. They are often disproportionately poor and suffer from legal discrimination.

=== Pre-colonial era ===
While the exact nature and origins of the ethnic groups during the pre-colonial era Burundi is debated, many scholars have reached a consensus that ethnic divisions of Hutu, Tutsi and Twa groups did exist. Studies indicate that the Twa group was the first to settle in the area known as modern-day Burundi as artisans or hunter-gatherers. The presence of the largest group, the Hutus, came later around 1000 c.e. as a predominantly farmer group. The Tutsis arrived last and occupied positions such as cattle herders or pastoralists. The inter-group dynamic in pre-colonial Burundi was not one rooted in deep antagonisms. Divisions did exist, however, as the groups were solidified and distinct especially via labor. While socio-economic roles played a major role in distinguishing one group from the other, the role of biological features is less known. There did seem to be notable divisions between what were referred to as generally light-skinned, tall Tutsis and dark-skinned shorter Hutus, but the role and magnitude of such characteristics is unclear. Tutsis were seen as a wealthier and powerful group given their labor role and warfare abilities, while the Hutus and Twas were a less wealthy majority together. The emphasis on labor and wealth, however, did allow for fluidity within the groups as acquiring wealth or switching tasks could enable transitions. Hutus who acquired cattle, for example, could essentially become Tutsis and vice versa. This transition was not always simple since there have been instances of ceremonies that confirm the conversion, indicating that wealth was not the only marker separating the groups, but one had to become the other formally. Descent was also emphasized as one was born into the categorizations, despite being able to change later. The overall emphasis on labor and its link to status has often led to the association of pre-colonial Burundian ethnicity to the idea of classes.

==== Consolidation under monarchy ====
Given their wealth and warfare abilities, the shortage of land availability and conflict over it led to the Tutsi domination of Burundi in the 16th century through the establishment of a hierarchical monarchy ruled by divine kings or mwami, the first of which was Ntare I. The kings were Tutsi (at least in theory, though some would contend that they were more properly described as Ganwa); below them existed a separate class of princes, Ganwa, that were themselves potential heirs to the throne. This group usually distinguished themselves from the Hutu, Tutsi, and Twa masses. Many regions within Burundi were further controlled by Tutsi elites who were in turn loyal to the king. While this sort of hierarchy established a client-patron relation that especially revolved around royalty to Tutsi elites, there existed, both within the elites and especially in the masses, inter-mixing of groups. It was common for Hutus and Tutsis to intermarry on the level of the masses, and many Hutus to become Tutsi or of elite status via acquiring wealth. Even within the Tutsis there existed internal divisions between those who were regarded as “high”, or Tutsi-Banyaruguru, usually those belonging to the princely class, and those who were deemed as “low”, or Tutsi-Hima, who were often subordinate to wealthier Hutus. It could be said that the idea of ethnicity besides being more fluid, was also heterogeneous within the categories themselves. Despite the monarchy seemingly enhancing social hierarchies, many believed that its function also was in the interest of society at large as order alongside wealth was generated.

=== Colonial era ===
==== German rule ====
After the Berlin Conference in 1884-5, Burundi came under German colonial sphere and then in 1890, it formally became a part of German East Africa. Given an inter-dynastic struggle between the two groups of the Bezi and the Batare, Germany was able to exploit the monarchical conflict and access power by siding with the Bezi in promise of a formal recognition of German rule in Burundi. Once in charge, Germany resorted to indirect rule given limitations of ability to rule directly and via settlement, and reached its objectives through the hierarchies in place. Out of fear of potential growth in the power of the monarch, German colonial rule empowered many of the chiefs in place which further enhanced the status of many Tutsi elites that had existed before. This also solidified the patron-client relations already subjugating many Hutus. Combined with the need to efficiently run Burundi, Germans began to note distinctions between the three groups of Hutus, Tutsis and Twas and searched for justifications of Tutsi favoritism. Given the preexisting divides and discourses of Social Darwinism, pseudo-scientific beliefs and studies began to surface, indicating that the Tutsis were descendants of people from Ethiopia, ancient Egypt, and Asia Minor, suggesting a closer connection to Europeans themselves. This was further advanced by generalizing biological distinctions between the groups and viewing the Tutsis as having more Eurocentric features. The amalgamation of such beliefs yielded to an anthropological hypothesis called the Hamitic hypothesis or “Hamitic myth”. The hypothesis argues that Tutsis were connected to the biblical Ham, and thus closer to the Christian world of Europeans themselves. This implied a genetic connection with East African peoples, although later scientific inquiries have refuted such claims. Additionally, a money-based economy was introduced to Burundi that served to change the previous nature of cattle as wealth, enabling a socio-economic mobility and further solidifying the ethnic categorizations.

==== Belgian rule ====
The system of indirect colonial rule transferred to Belgium after Germany’s loss in WW1 and was reaffirmed through the Treaty of Versailles. The Belgians largely continued the German precedent of Tutsi favoritism and Hamitic beliefs and enhanced it through the creation of further divisions. Tutsis were granted the opportunity of education by Belgian Catholic priests, leading to many conversions to Catholicism and ideas of elitism due to the obtainment of formal education. Through the indirect oversight, Tutsis were able to impose forced, extractive labor on the majority Hutus, compensate Hutu lands, and impose taxes and mandatory cash crop collection. Such abuse by especially Tutsi elites, created a strong association between colonial rule and the Tutsi ethnic group in the eyes of Hutus and Twas. In the 1930s, Belgians introduced administrative centralization that enhanced Tutsi ranks in the administrative political, social and economic elites, especially the ganwa-Tutsi, at the expense of any Hutu presence in such positions of power. This was further overseen through introduction of identity cards indicating the ethnicity of individuals that hindered any flexibility between ethnic lines that occurred before. Furthermore, such cards helped determine who could be educated and the treatment of individuals according to their ethnicity. In a way, the groups were also separated by being ruled with different ‘customary laws’ dependent on ethnicity.

The extreme solidification of ideas of ethnic division under European rule have been described by some scholars as being a ‘racialization’ of what used to be a more socioeconomic, fluid idea of ethnicity. Furthermore, some scholars have argued that the presence of indirect rule, or lack of direct settlement by Europeans in Burundi, and clear separation of the three groups served to alter ideas of who ‘settlers’ were as it created an image, especially in the minds of more oppressed Hutus, that the Tutsis were in a sense settlers, or beneficiaries of the colonial system just like Germans and Belgians. The previous, pre-colonial system although still stratified, was in ways mutually beneficial as resources stayed within Burundi, advancing the kingdom and its people, yet the colonial extractive rule damaged the economy, environment, and resources of Burundi as most labor only benefitted a small elite and the European countries. Given the association between Tutsis and Europeans, majority Hutus and Twa increasingly blamed the worsening situation of Burundi on the Tutsis themselves. Despite such views on the solidified hierarchy, it has been noted that colonial rule in general, still subjugated even the Tutsi elites in comparison with their European rulers, thus all three groups experienced varied levels of oppression.

After WW2, as ideas of democracy, human rights and decolonization were taking form, a new generation of Belgian priests and administrators began to advance equality in Burundi by viewing Hutu participation in state and even church affairs more favorably. This opening up was accompanied by manifestations of many anti-colonial protests and even Tutsi worries of losing power and influence due to such shifts in attitude. This worry combined with Hutu discontent, ultimately united the groups in a struggle against the colonial power. Ultimately, with increasing international pressures on Belgium to decolonize Burundi, Burundi underwent a devolvement of legislative authority to what was an indirectly-elected council with mwami, or king, as the constitutional monarch. Alongside this came an ethnically-mixed territorial guard that would turn into the national army of Burundi. Such developments, combined with ethnic violence in neighboring Rwanda, led to a period of national unity against colonial powers in Burundi, calling for the county’s independence.

=== Independence ===
One of the first parties to call for Burundian independence was the Union pour le Progres National (UPRONA) that united the Burundian ethnic groups in a common call for independence from Belgium. Especially appalled by the ethnic violence and instability in neighboring Rwanda, the country called for ethnic unity, something that had largely been absent during the colonial era. The Belgians, opposing such independence, supported the allied Parti Démocrate Chrétien (PDC), but at the time of elections, UPRONA won the majority vote and the country ultimately gained independence in 1962 as a monarchy where the king, holding executive power, would share legislative power with the Parliament. Since independence, Burundi has seen extensive violence between members of the Hutu and Tutsi ethnic groups. Burundi's post-colonial ethnic tensions have especially been compared to those in Rwanda, which saw similar ethnic tension between Hutu and Tutsi flare up into violence on several occasions, notably during the Rwandan genocide.

==== Monarchy ====
The unity of UPRONA did not last long as its leading moderate Prince and then Prime Minister Rwagasore, was assassinated by opposition. A power vacuum soon followed that pitted Hutus and Tutsis against one another and capitalized on ethnic politics rather than the previously sought national unity. With Burundi an independent state now, the ethnic groups quickly sought to advance their own self-interests. Tutsi elites began to use their influence and power coming from the colonial era to advance their ranks in Burundian politics while excluding Hutus, and also gained control of the military. The monarchy, then under Mwambutsa, was the sole source of power and resorted to ease the potential ethnic tensions by balancing the Hutu and Tutsi representation in successive governments up until 1965. This balancing act was not necessarily appreciated by both sides leading to further escalation of tensions. Tensions peaked in 1965, when the king appointed Hutu prime minister Ngendendumwe, who was assassinated by a Tutsi extremist. The mwami then resorted to elections anew, only to go against the Hutu majority results and appoint Tutsi Leopold Biha as Prime Minister. This then led to violence and revolt by many Hutu elites and politicians, leading to Tutsi retaliation and violent suppression of it by the Tutsi-majority army led by Captain Michel Micombero. Soon after, Hutus across the country reacted, resulting in the killing of around 500 Tutsis. What followed was a purge of Hutus across Burundi under Micombero as especially educated, influential and wealthy Hutus were expelled or killed. Such actions ultimately served to destroy Hutu representation in politics and purged a generation of Hutu leaders in Burundi, greatly enhancing Tutsi status. After the violent clashes, the mwami fled to Congo and Burundi would soon become a republic under Micombero, where the Tutsi elites held control of the leading party UPRONA, the military, and most other institutions. Some scholars have described this period as starting the Tutsi domination over the means of negotiation for future conflicts.

==== First Republic ====
The First Republic of Burundi under Micombero started a Tutsi domination and further purging of Hutus from various positions of power ranging from military to education. Additionally, his rule started a chain of Tutsi-Bahima rule that was more anti-monarchy, and would continue until the 1990s. Ethnic violence peaked in 1972 when 100,000 people, mainly Hutu, were killed by the Tutsi regime in the Ikiza, the first of what is known as the Burundian genocides. With discontent greatly building up, the event started with a Hutu rebellion in the Imbo region against the Micombero government, calling for a replacement of the monarchy. This event led to the deaths of an estimated 2000-3000 Tutsis. Twa had also been targeted, specifically in violence directed against the Tutsi with whom they were sometimes associated. The government’s response was yet another wave of Hutu purges and killings by the military which also led to extensive Hutu emigration to neighboring countries. This violence, as before, especially targeted Hutus who had obtained education, thus crippling the ability for Hutu to partake in political and administrative affairs in Burundi for another generation. The UN at the time called the event genocidal repression although not much international pressure occurred.

==== Second Republic ====
After Micombero and his controversial rule, Burundi started a period of less militaristic Tutsi rule under Bagaza and then later under Buyoya. Bagza’s government was less severe than the previous as institutional changes occurred including a new constitution, creating the Second Republic, to fully integrate the previously excluded Hutu population. Despite such efforts, Burundian politics still remained Tutsi-dominated and violence continued, although less severe. Bagza enhanced the power of UPRONA while simultaneously bringing the Catholic church under the control of the state as it was believed that the church favored Hutus.

==== Third Republic ====
Bagaza’s rule was followed by a power grab under Pierre Buyoya who had a more reconciliatory politics. His initial actions were to mollify the persecution of the church, thus showing openness to Hutu participation and incorporation of Hutus in the government itself. Yet the pace of such reforms were slow and combined with backlash from Tutsi extremist groups, tensions erupted again in 1988. A Hutu revolt ultimately ended with Tutsi retaliation causing many deaths. The reaction of the international community to the massacres was greater this time with pressures on Buyoya to act and mitigate the situation. Following the events and pressures, Buyoya enacted institutional reforms and adopted a new constitution in 1992, that served to minimize the possibilities of ethnic politics. Hutu representation in national organizations and committees was greatly increased, and issues of national unity and barriers to education for Hutus were formally addressed by the government. His rule has been described as being the beginning of the Third Republic of Burundi given the new constitution. The amendments ultimately led to multi-party elections and the election of a Hutu president, Melchior Ndadaye, in 1993, which was lauded by the international community. Ndadaye’s rule emphasized a balancing representation of ethnic groups in Burundi, yet soon after his election, a Tutsi-led attempted military coup resulted in his assassination.

After the assassination of Ndadaye, what followed was the Burundian Civil War until 1996. This period is described as a vacuum of power that led to violent conflict between Hutu -majority and pro-Tutsi groups. Some people wanted to advance the politics under Ndadaye’s government while pro-coup groups challenged this path. There were small periods of consensus with the presidency of Cyprien Ntaryamira, a Hutu, in 1994, which was later followed by his death in the plane crash with Rwandan president Juvénal Habyarimana, leading to further instability. Late in 1994, a commission agreed to establish a coalition government led by Hutu Sylvestre Ntibantunganya, yet fighting only intensified despite efforts of peace and reconciliation. In 1996, a coup d'etat under the tutsi-led army put Buyoya back in power, with much domestic and international backlash.

==== Peace Talks-Present ====
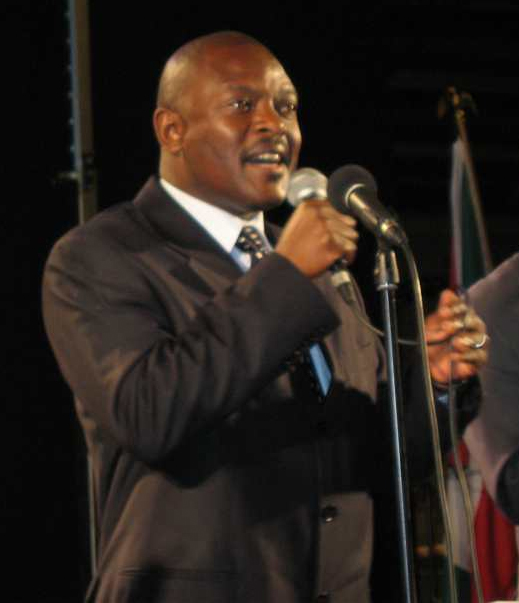
Pierre Nkurunziza

After years of violence and increasing deaths, peace talks began to take form starting in 1995. With international easing of sanctions against the Buyoya regime came greater engagement and push to unify ethnic divisions in Burundi. Rivaling Hutu and Tutsi factions began to partake in the talks that were first moderated by Julius Nyerere and then Nelson Mandela in 1999. During this time, fighting between various parties and factions did not stop however, and displacement and death toll kept rising. In 2000, the Arusha Agreement was reached, and the talks formally ended in 2001. A multinational interim security contingent was to enforce peace in Burundi, yet despite this many rebel groups continued violent acts to some extent. The agreement pushed for ethnic balancing in the Burundian government, military, and even state-owned firms. After the presidency of Hutu Ndayizeye, more rebel groups signed peace accords and finally in 2005, after Hutu Pierre Nkurunziza took power, the final of the remaining Hutu rebel groups signed a peace agreement with the government, creating hope for national unity. Ceasefire agreements have continued on until 2008. 2005 also saw the introduction of a new power-sharing constitution. As a measure to limit the possibilities for discrimination, the 2005 Burundian constitution prescribes ethnic quotas (usually 60 percent Hutu to 40 percent Tutsi) in certain government institutions, including the military. Three seats in each house of the Burundian government are allocated to the Twa.

Recent political developments under the Nkurunziza have worried many experts as violence, electoral fraud controversies, and human rights issues have increased in Burundi. Many have described the ruler as increasingly dictatorial and there has been great worry that the nature of political conflict in Burundi today may evolve into ethnic conflict again. Various international organizations such as Amnesty International have been challenged by the government with accusations of not following ethnic quota guidelines, yet some have described this as simply a way of eliminating challenges to the increasing governmental powers. Combined with the expulsion or end of negotiation with many transnational organizations (e.g. U.N. Human Rights office), constitutional amendments such as ending the ethnic quota system implemented by the Arusha Agreement have caused much fear and controversy. Some politicians have also described the Nkurunziza government's issuing of arrest warrants to actors involved in the 1993 Ndadaye assassination as ethnically-charged and have criticized it as having the potential to create further divisions. The military itself has seen reemergence of some ethnic-related conflicts that have suggested that cohesion within the military has not been fully achieved after all.

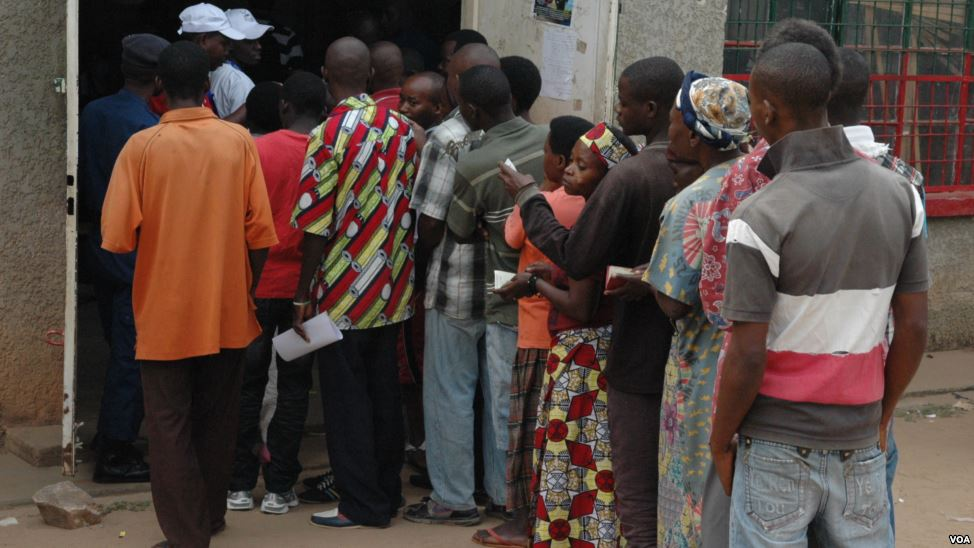
The Burundian presidential elections in 2015 amidst growing controversy surrounding Nkurunziza leadership

While the decades of horrifying violence have led to a general sense of fatigue in Burundi combined with the efforts of the Arusha Agreement to unite ethnicities in the country, ethnic divides are still visible on a societal, everyday level. Intermarriage between ethnic groups is uncommon and even in cases of it, children are usually required to identify with one group or the other. Additionally, the groups still view each other as different and this sometimes leads to skepticism and historical memory.

== Theoretical approaches to ethnicity ==
The complex idea and role of ethnicity in Burundi especially regarding its effects on Burundian history, has instigated studies regarding its creation and maintenance. Scholars, throughout history, have focused on what ethnicity in the country has been during varying eras and what distinguished one group from another, regarding the three dominant groups of Hutu, Tutsi and Twa. There have been various notable theoretical or abstract approaches to explain the idea of ethnicity and some have been more prevalent during certain eras in Burundian history than others.

=== Essentialist/Primordial argument ===
The essentialist or primordial argument supports the idea that there were innate or biological divisions between ethnic groups in Burundi. Oftentimes, people may refer to physical features or biological traits and some may even go as far as racializing the ethnic differences. This may come in the form of scientific studies or pseudo-scientific ones that were especially dominant during the colonial period under Germany and then Belgium. Some scholars have argued that Tutsis tend to have more Eurocentric physical features while Hutus have more Afrocentric ones, which would also become a justification for racism by colonizing powers. Others have argued a geographical approach of difference in origin and have described the Tutsis as immigrating into the region of modern-day Burundi from more northern regions of Africa, or the Hamitic hypothesis, while Hutus being there earlier from more central regions of Africa. The hypothesis became a basis for preferential treatment of Tutsis by the European powers. Additionally, scholars describe that the Twa group has been in the region the longest. These spatial divisions could suggest innate features that the groups carried from their geographical origins. Such primordial approaches suggest that ethnicity by default was a marker of divisions between the three groups in the region and these divisions have progressed and solidified since pre-colonial times. Despite the prevalence of this view in the past especially during the colonial period, many scholars tend to refute this approach to ethnicity today.

=== Constructivist argument ===
The more constructivist approach or perspective argues that while there does exist ethnic divisions, what is crucial in understanding ethnicity in Burundi is its evolving nature depending on many external factors. Such factors included occupation and class, and others potentially related to socioeconomic reality. This suggests that ethnicity is not seen as primordial and is rather a constructed identity that is subject to change over time and due to conditions. Scholars of this perspective argue that there are no clear essentialist divisions especially when observing groups such as Hutus and the Tutsis. The socioeconomic approach suggests that these categorizations simply are based on economic gains and status and given pre-colonial Burundi, they often cite the example of how Hutus could become a Tutsi via acquiring a herd of cattle and vice versa. The Twa group was often seen as an artisanal group or hunters that is what made them distinct from the other groups, or Twa. Such ideas also suggests that ethnicity could be fluid and changing. Another argument scholars use is how the two groups have also often mixed and in instances where children had parents of the two ethnic categories, they would adopt the ethnic classification of their father, refuting ideas of any “pure” and homogenous race or ethnicity. Thus such arguments put a heavy emphasis on the economic and social realities and mobilities of the group during the pre-colonial era that would later solidify the groups of ethnicity.

Although the constructivist approach can have generalizations, some scholars note how in Burundi, despite the consolidation of three major categories of ethnicity through state agency, there existed varying levels of divisions within the categories themselves. This means that the formation of ethnicity through certain lifestyles, status and economic standing could lead to ideas of cultural and ethnic consolidation, yet, in reality this consolidation may not have necessarily been as strongly in place as some suggest. Thus, even differences in lifestyle or external factors within a general group, could lead to further divisions. For example, ritualists within the Hutu ethnic group were often divided and seen as separate from the rest of the Hutus. Tutsis also had groups like the Hima that were viewed as culturally distinct from the broader Tutsi group but still identified as ethnically Tutsi. This shows a level of nuance regarding ideas of ethnicity in Burundi and how such ethnicities could even be further divided within themselves.

=== Instrumentalist argument ===
This approach has looked at ethnicity from a political perspective, arguing that in Burundi, ethnicity and differences especially became meaningful through political mobilization. Politicians and politics alike, magnified the tensions between groups like Hutus and Tutsis and this gave meaning to their identification and in turn conflicts. Although this approach does not necessarily deny other reasons of ethnic difference, it does argue that political processes are what make ethnicity salient. Some scholars have referred to the pre-colonial political consolidation in Burundi that started to emphasize ethnic divisions. They have also described the political processes under the colonial administration as awakening a sense of ethnicity, belonging and difference. Other scholars have especially highlighted the post-independence Burundi where politics greatly influenced ethnicity and served to push the groups against one another. It is argued that politics makes ethnicity an instrument to achieve greater goals, yielding to greater inter-group divisions.

=== Other arguments ===
Some scholars have approached the question of ethnicity by exploring the perceptions of it in the Burundian population itself. This gives space for people who identify as any of the three predominant or other ethnicities, to explain their own reasoning behind the classifications. Such studies have suggested that people perceive the categories of ethnicity as being a mix of both essentialist and constructivist arguments. Some people believe in descent as playing a rather crucial factor in determining ethnicity without necessarily looking at biological factors. Such reasonings suggest a constructed or social phenomenon that later became essentialized and plays a large role in the distinction to many today. This approach shows that people do believe in ethnic divisions and can see elements of both constructed and essentialized realities that define who they are.

== Immigrant ethnic groups ==
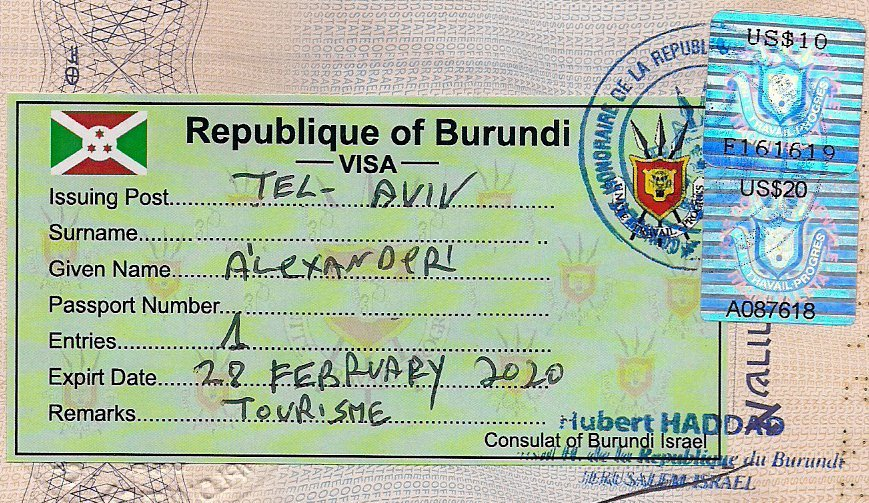
Burundi's visa entry stamp

Besides the three dominant indigenous ethnic groups, a visible number of recent immigrants live in Burundi. Most come from neighboring Central African countries (especially the Congo, Tanzania, and Rwanda) but other come from West Africa. There are also European and Asian communities in the country numbering approximately 3,000 and 2,000 people respectively. In 2016, Burundi began to count the number of foreigners and immigrants in its country through a census. There were rumors of the government's intent on issuing biometric cards to all foreign nationals at that time in Burundi. Some politicians argued that the event was due to the tense atmosphere surrounding the Nkurunziza government, and accusations towards Rwanda of trying to incite violence in Burundi, especially against the government. To many, this mistrust towards Rwandans and to a lesser extent westerners (who could be representatives of organizations), is what triggered the attention given to non-indigenous populations in Burundi.

== See also ==
- Languages of Burundi
- List of ethnic groups of Africa
