= Prostitution in Rwanda =

Prostitution in Rwanda is illegal in all aspects. Prostitutes, clients and any involved third parties (such as pimps and brothel keepers) are criminalised by the country's Penal Code. However, a draft of a new Penal Code that does not prohibit prostitution was presented for debate in the Rwandan Parliament in December 2017.

Due to the immense poverty in the country, many women have been forced into prostitution to make a living. In 2012 it was estimated that there were 12,278 sex workers in the country. It is thought that 45.8% of sex workers in Rwanda are HIV positive.

== Overview ==
Although prostitution is illegal it is widespread, particularly in the capital, Kigali, and other urban centres. Many prostitutes work from bars. Often men who are seeking prostitutes sit at the bar, and those who are not sit away from the bar counter. A significant number of university students use sex work to supplement their income.

Sex workers report harassment from the police.

On 23 September 2006, the Minister of Gender and Family Promotion Valeria Nyirahabineza ordered prostitutes in Rwanda to stop selling sex otherwise they would face legal action. She claimed that prostitution was a root cause of the HIV problem facing Rwanda. In March 2007 President Paul Kagame gave a speech stating that prostitution in Rwanda must be stopped. He stated: "It is not part of Rwanda’s path to development and, therefore, must stop".

The Rwanda Law Reform Commission started a review of the penal law in 2015 in an attempt to bring the country's laws up date. The Draft Penal Code removes the prohibition of prostitution except for forced prostitution. Parliament started debating the Draft Penal Code in November 2017.

== Legal situation ==
Section 4 of the Penal Code deals with prostitution:

Sub-section : Obligations and penalties for failure to comply

- Article 204: Definition of prostitution
- Article 205: Obligations to be fulfilled by a prostitute

Any person who engages in prostitution shall fulfill, for a period not exceeding one year, one or more of the following obligations:

1° not to leave territorial limits determined by the Court;
2° not to go to certain places determined by the court;
3° to be subjected to surveillance measures;
4° to seek medical treatment;
5° to periodically report to administrative services or authorities determined by the court.

A person who violates any of the obligations under items 1º to 5º of this Article, shall be liable to a term of imprisonment of at least three (3) months but less than six (6) months.

If a person subsequently commits prostitution as provided under Paragraph 2 of this Article shall be liable to a term of imprisonment of six (6) months to two (2) years and a fine of fifty thousand (50,000) to five hundred thousand (500,000) Rwandan francs or one of these penalties.

The penalties under paragraph 2 of this Article shall also apply to any person caught having sexual intercourse with a prostitute.

Sub-section 2: Incitement to prostitution

- Article 206: Encouraging, inciting or manipulating a person for the purpose of prostitution
- Article 207: Discouraging efforts to rehabilitate prostitutes
- Article 208: Advertisement for facilitation of prostitution

Sub-section 3: Exploitation of the prostitution

- Article 209: Running, managing or investing in a brothel
- Article 210: Sharing the proceeds of prostitution
- Article 211: Sharing the proceeds of prostitution by a child
- Article 212: Aiding, abetting and protecting prostitution
- Article 213: Providing a facility for prostitution

Sub-section 4: Aggravating circumstances

- Article 214: Aggravating circumstances for prostitution-related offence

== Serial murders of prostitutes ==
A number of women, mostly prostitutes, were murdered in Kigali between July and August 2012. The total number of victims was variously reported as fifteen and eighteen. The murders may have been the work of one person, with some people referring to the killer as the "African Jack the Ripper". One victim was described by neighbours as having had the words "I will stop once I have killed 400 prostitutes" carved into the flesh of her stomach, although this was dismissed as a rumour by the police.

It was reported in November 2012 that eight men had been arrested and that one of them had confessed to the murders.

== Sex trafficking ==
Rwanda is a source, transit, and to a lesser extent, destination country for women, and children subjected to sex trafficking. Rwandan girls and some boys, some of whom are secondary school students between the ages of 13 and 18, are exploited in commercial sex in hotels, at times through the facilitation of hotel owners. Local human rights groups reported in 2016 that some Rwandan girls in domestic work, who become pregnant and thereby have their employment terminated by their employers and are unable to return to their home villages, are subsequently exploited in sex trafficking. Some Rwandan men, women, and children are subjected to sex trafficking to destinations around the world; the primary destinations for Rwandan victims are Uganda, the DRC, and other parts of East Africa. Rwandan victims are also reportedly exploited in sex trafficking to China. In previous years, Rwandan victims were exploited in South Africa, Malaysia, the United States, and Europe. In 2016, some Rwandan girls were forced into marriages with men in Tanzania and may have experienced commercial sexual exploitation through these marriages. Reporting in 2013 indicated that Kampala- and Nairobi-based labour recruiters and brokers recruited Rwandan workers through fraudulent offers of employment abroad and subjected them to sex trafficking.

Refugees fleeing conflict and political violence in Burundi and the DRC remain highly vulnerable to trafficking in Rwanda or are subjected to exploitation in third countries after transiting Rwanda. According to an international organisation, there has been an increase in sex trafficking of Burundian male and female teenagers through Rwanda to third countries since 2015. Burundian refugee girls transited through Rwanda were exploited in sex trafficking in Uganda. Separately, female child refugees in a Congolese refugee camp were reportedly subjected to sex trafficking in nearby towns in 2015, allegedly facilitated by one civilian and three RDF soldiers assigned to the camp.

The United States Department of State Office to Monitor and Combat Trafficking in Persons ranks Rwanda as a 'Tier 2' country.
