= Prostitution in Tanzania =

Prostitution in Tanzania is illegal but widespread. UNAIDS estimate there to be 155,450 prostitutes in the country. Many women and young girls are forced into prostitution due to poverty, lack of job opportunities, culture, and the disintegration of the family unit. Many university students have to turn to prostitution for economic reasons.

Sex trafficking and child prostitution are a major problems in Tanzania.

The country is a destination for sex tourism, including female and child sex tourism, especially in the coastal resorts and Zanzibar.

== Sex tourism ==
Tanzania is a popular destination for sex tourism, particularly in Arusha Bagamoyo and the islands of Zanzibar, Mafia and Pemba. Many of the tourists are Italian.

Zanzibar is also a destination for female sex tourism. Many of the "beach boys" are not from Zanzibar. There are some agents offering holidays to the island, including an exclusive "guide". Most of the women are from Europe or North America.

Child sex tourism is a problem, especially on the coastal resorts and the Kenyan border. Whilst some of the children are trafficked, some turn to prostitution through poverty.

== HIV ==
Tanzania faces a mature, generalized HIV epidemic. In 2011, an estimated 1.6 million Tanzanians were living with HIV/AIDS. An estimated 1 out of 20 residents in the capital Dar es Salaam and 1 in 3 sex workers are infected with the HIV virus. Nationally, 28% of sex workers and 4.7% of all adults are infected.

Reports show that an increase in the number of cases of HIV and AIDS are growing at an alarming rate in Zanzibar. This is thought to have been added to by large numbers of tourists entering Zanzibar and fueling demand for prostitutes.

== Sex trafficking ==
Tanzania is a source, transit, and destination country for men, women, and children subjected to sex trafficking. Internal trafficking is more prevalent than transnational trafficking and characteristically facilitated by victims’ family members, friends, or intermediaries offering assistance with education or securing employment in urban areas. Impoverished children from the rural interior remain most vulnerable to trafficking. Girls are exploited in sex trafficking, particularly in tourist hubs and along the border with Kenya. Previous media reports indicate girls are subjected to sex trafficking in China. Tanzanian nationals are sometimes subjected sex trafficking in other African countries, the Middle East, Europe, Asia, and the United States. Trafficking victims from other countries, particularly children from Burundi, Rwanda, and Kenya, as well as adults from India, Nepal, and Yemen are subjected to sex trafficking. Citizens of neighbouring countries may transit Tanzania before being subjected to sex trafficking in South Africa, Europe, and the Middle East.

The United States Department of State Office to Monitor and Combat Trafficking in Persons ranks Tanzania as a "Tier 2" country.
