= Adrien Sibomana =

Burundian politician

Adrien Sibomana is a Burundian politician and civic leader who served as prime minister of Burundi from 19 October 1988 to 10 July 1993. At the time of the 1988 crisis in Burundi, he was governor of Muramvya Province.

Sibomana was appointed prime minister by President Pierre Buyoya in October 1988, after the violence at Ntega and Marangara and amid an effort by the government to broaden Hutu representation and address ethnic conflict. During his premiership, Burundi moved from military-led one-party rule toward multiparty politics. On 31 March 1992, Buyoya reconfirmed Sibomana as prime minister to lead a transition government ahead of general elections. The transition culminated in the adoption of a new constitution and the June 1993 elections, widely described as the country's first free democratic elections. After Melchior Ndadaye won the presidency, a new government was formed with Sylvie Kinigi as prime minister, ending Sibomana's term in office.

After leaving high office, Sibomana remained active in public life but withdrew from party politics. In a 2020 interview, he said that he had left party politics in 2002 and described himself as retired from political office. He also said that he had been involved in organic agriculture since 2011. By 2022, the Agence Burundaise de Presse identified him as president of the Burundi Organic Agricultural Movement, and he was publicly advocating reduced pesticide use and more sustainable farming methods.

Sibomana has also remained active in the institution of the Bashingantahe, a traditional Burundian body associated with mediation and social cohesion. In 2024, Le Renouveau du Burundi described him as president of the National Council of Bashingantahe. In February 2025, the Burundi News Agency reported that he opened an extraordinary session of the council aimed at relaunching its activities and reaffirming its role in reconciliation and conflict resolution.

Political offices
Preceded by Édouard Nzambimana	Prime Minister of Burundi; 1988–1993	Succeeded by Sylvie Kinigi
