= Arusha Agreement =

1969 treaty between the European Community, Kenya, Uganda and Tanzania

The Arusha Agreement was a treaty signed on 24 September 1969 in Arusha, Tanzania, between the European Community and the three East African states of Kenya, Uganda and Tanzania. The agreement entered into force on 1 January 1971 for a five-year period, concomitant with the second Yaoundé Convention, with the aim of establishing better economic relations between the EC and the African states. At the end of their validity time, the Lomé Convention was signed which substituted the previous agreements and expanded the partnership to include 46 ACP countries.

== History ==
In 1967, three East African countries (Kenya, Tanzania and Uganda) that were not members of the Associated African and Malagasy States (AAMS), but were instead member states of the Commonwealth of Nations combined to establish the East African Community (EAC). On 26 July 1968 the EEC signed an initial Association Agreement with the EAC. That Agreement did not enter into force because it was not ratified by all the countries involved. On 24 September 1969 in Arusha, a second Agreement was signed between the EEC and the EAC. That Agreement was signed at the same time as the Convention of Association between the EEC and the AAMS (Yaoundé II); both the Arusha Agreement and the Yaoundé II Convention entered into force on 1 January 1971 for a period of five years.

== Content ==
The Arusha Agreement established a trade association (partial free-trade areas and joint institutions) but, unlike the Yaoundé II Convention, without financial and technical cooperation. Accordingly, the Agreement covered trade (Title I), the right of establishment and the provision of services (Title II), payments and capital (Title III), institutional provisions (Title IV), and general and final provisions (Title V).

== See also ==
- East African Community
- List of treaties
