= Édouard Nzambimana =

Burundian politician (1945–2015)

Édouard Nzambimana (20 December 1945 – September 2015) was Prime Minister of Burundi from 12 November 1976 until 13 October 1978, when the post was abolished. He then became foreign affairs minister, serving until 1982.

Prior to becoming prime minister, Nzambimana had been educated in Belgium and was a Lieutenant-Colonel in the army.

Political offices
Preceded by Albin Nyamoya	Prime Minister of Burundi; 1976–1978	Succeeded by Adrien Sibomana (1988)
