= Anatole Kanyenkiko =

Tutsi Burundian politician

Anatole Kanyenkiko (born 1952) was the Prime Minister of Burundi from 7 February 1994 to 22 February 1995. An ethnic Tutsi from Ngozi Province, Kanyenkiko was a member of the Union for National Progress (UPRONA), a political party.

On 14 November 2007 President Pierre Nkurunziza appointed him Minister of Environment, Land Development and Public Works.

Political offices
Preceded by Sylvie Kinigi	Prime Minister of Burundi; 1994-1995	Succeeded by Antoine Nduwayo
