= Albin Nyamoya =

Albin Nyamoya (27 July 1924 – 31 January 2001) was the Prime Minister of Burundi from 6 April 1964 – 7 January 1965 and again from 14 July 1972 – 5 June 1973.

== Early life ==
Nyamoya was born in 1924 in Ibuye. He was ethnically a Tutsi. He was educated at the Mugera Catholic Seminary and the Groupe Scolaire d'Astrida, studying veterinary science at the latter institution. He thereafter worked as a veterinarian assistant.

== Political career ==
Nyamoya was elected to the National Assembly in 1961 as a member of the Union for National Progress (UPRONA) party. He served as Interior Minister from 1963 to 1964. He was re-elected to the assembly in May 1965.

On 14 July 1972, President Michel Micombero appointed Nyamoya Prime Minister of Burundi, making him the first person to hold such office since Micombero assumed power in November 1966. Nyamoya's appointment was viewed by observers as a choice to relieve ethnic tensions. He was dismissed from office on 6 June 1973.

== Later life ==
Following his dismissal from office, Nyamoya turned to farming.

== Works cited ==
- Chrétien, Jean-Pierre; Dupaquier, Jean-François (2007). Burundi 1972, au bord des génocides (in French). Paris: Karthala Editions. ISBN 9782845868724.
- Eggers, Ellen K. (2006). Historical Dictionary of Burundi (third ed.). Lanham: Scarecrow Press. ISBN 978-0-8108-5302-7.
- Lentz, Harris M. (2014). Heads of States and Governments Since 1945. Routledge. ISBN 9781134264902.
- Weinstein, Warren (1976). Historical Dictionary of Burundi. Metuchen: Scarecrow Press. ISBN 9780810809628.

Political offices
Preceded by Pierre Ngendandumwe	Prime Minister of Burundi; 1964–1965	Succeeded by Pierre Ngendandumwe
Preceded by Position re-created	Prime Minister of Burundi; 1972–1973	Succeeded by Édouard Nzambimana
