= Sylvie Kinigi =

Burundian politician and economist

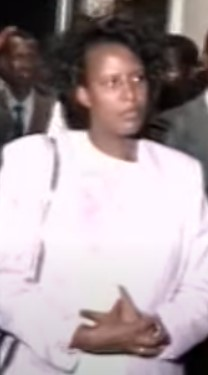
- Kinigi in 1993

President of Burundi
- Acting
- In office 27 October 1993 – 5 February 1994
- Preceded by: François Ngeze (acting)
- Succeeded by: Cyprien Ntaryamira

4th Prime Minister of Burundi
- In office 10 July 1993 – 5 February 1994
- President: Melchior Ndadaye
- Preceded by: Adrien Sibomana
- Succeeded by: Anatole Kanyenkiko

Personal details
- Born: Sylvie Ntigashira; 24 November 1953 (age 72) Mugoyi, Bujumbura Rural Province, Burundi
- Party: Union pour le Progrès national
- Education: University of Burundi

Sylvie Kinigi (née Ntigashira; born 24 November 1953) is a Burundian politician and economist who served as prime minister of Burundi from 10 July 1993 to 7 February 1994, and acting president from November 1993 to 5 February 1994, making her the second African woman to serve as a president.

Born to a Tutsi family, she earned a degree in banking from the University of Burundi in 1979 and another diploma from the Centre de Formation de la Profession Bancaire in Paris. Politically, Kinigi was closely affiliated with the Union pour le Progrès national (UPRONA), Burundi's only legal political party at the time, and was an active member of the Union des Femmes Burundaises, a subgroup of UPRONA, serving as a member of its central committee by 1987. In that capacity she lobbied for legislative changes and government measures to benefit women. In 1990 Kinigi was hired by the Bank of the Republic of Burundi to direct its department of research and statistics, and the following year she was placed in charge of Burundi's structural adjustment program.

In the summer of 1993 Burundi hosted free elections, which were won by UPRONA's rival, Front pour la Démocratie au Burundi (FRODEBU). The new FRODEBU President of Burundi, Melchior Ndadaye, appointed Kinigi prime minister of Burundi on 10 July. Kinigi wished to pursue economic development while she was prime minister, but thought that this could not be achieved until ethnic tensions between Tutsis and Hutus were reduced. Thus, she declared that ethnic reconciliation would be her top priority. On 21 October President Ndadaye and several other officials were killed by Tutsi soldiers in a coup attempt, leaving her the highest-ranking official alive and the de facto head of state of Burundi.

She joined her surviving ministers in the French embassy until she could return to her residence under French military guard as the coup failed. Though her government proved unable to contain the ethnic violence following the coup, she played a key role in brokering a political compromise that allowed for the election of Cyprien Ntaryamira as the next president. She resigned when he took office in 1994 and assumed an executive position at the Banque Commerciale du Burundi. She then held several international positions before returning to Burundi in 2008 and becoming an independent economic consultant.

== Early life and education ==
Sylvie Ntigashira was born on 24 November 1953 in Mugoyi, Ruanda-Urundi (today in Bujumbura Rural Province). Ethnically, she is Tutsi. Her father was a merchant, while her mother farmed and maintained their home. The third of six children, Ntigashira was allowed to attend school while the oldest daughter in the family helped their mother. She was given a primary and secondary education by nuns in the Ijenda parish. She then studied at the University of Burundi under the Faculty of Economic Sciences, graduating in 1979 with a degree in banking and credit. In 1990 she earned a Diplômes d'études supérieures from the Centre de Formation de la Profession Bancaire in Paris.

In 1973, Ntigashira married a Burundian academic, Firmin Kinigi, who had taught her in school, and had four or five children with him. He was ethnically Hutu. Her husband supported her desire to further her education and career and the family hired a maid to take care of their house and children. He died in either 1992 or 1993.

== Career ==
=== Early political and government work ===
Burundi became independent from Belgium as Burundi in July 1962. The country quickly fell under the political domination of Tutsis at the expense of the Hutu majority ethnic group. Kinigi believed that democracy was introduced too rapidly in Burundi without proper preparation, leading to political organising along ethnic lines and the heightening of ethnic tensions. Burundi's government became controlled by Tutsi military officers, who ruled for approximately 30 years. Politically, Kinigi was closely affiliated with the Union pour le Progrès national (UPRONA), Burundi's only legal political party, and was an active member of the Union des Femmes Burundaises, a subgroup of UPRONA, serving as a member of its central committee by 1987. In that capacity she lobbied for legislative changes and government measures to benefit women.

In 1990 Kinigi was hired by the Bank of the Republic of Burundi to direct its department of research and statistics, while also teaching courses at the University of Burundi. In 1991 she left the job when President Pierre Buyoya appointed her Special Consultant in the Office of the Prime Minister, making her responsible for the implementation of Burundi's structural adjustment program. In that capacity she conducted negotiations with the International Monetary Fund, the World Bank, and foreign donors. Impressed with her work, Buyoya subsequently appointed her Permanent Secretary in the Ministry of Economic Planning.

=== Prime Minister of Burundi ===
In the summer of 1993 Burundi underwent a democratic transition. The country hosted free elections, which were won by UPRONA's rival, Front pour la Démocratie au Burundi (FRODEBU). The new president of Burundi, Melchior Ndadaye—the leader of FRODEBU and the first Hutu to become head of state, offered Kinigi the position of prime minister of Burundi in his new government to succeed Adrien Sibomana. She reportedly considered the offer for some time, but eventually decided to accept it, reasoning that she was not more politically inexperienced than the army officers which had previously ruled the country. Furthermore, she was personally acquainted with Ndadaye, having studied alongside him at Parisian institutions and even sat on a committee that judged his academic performance. She was also an acquaintance of Léonard Nyangoma and Cyprien Ntaryamira, two FRODEBU politicians who Ndadaye wanted to become ministers in the new government. Speaking of her selection, Kinigi stated that it was "a good surprise for Burundian women primarily, but for African women too."

FRODEBU hardliners were angered by Kinigi's appointment, seeing her assumption of the premiership to be a betrayal by Ndadaye. Radical UPRONA members were also displeased with her selection, since the party did not formally nominate her as a candidate, and they felt that Ndadaye had chosen her purely because she was a Tutsi woman and did not expect to rely on her abilities in office. The government ultimately comprised two-thirds Hutu and one-third Tutsi members. Kinigi was one of two women ministers. The government was sworn in on 10 July. Kinigi wished to pursue economic development while she was prime minister, but thought that this could not be achieved until ethnic tensions were reduced. Thus, she declared that ethnic reconciliation would be her highest priority. In mid-October she dispatched her ministers across the country on a mission to promote calm and understanding; she went to the northeast to denounce the "barbarism" of political violence associated with the previous elections.

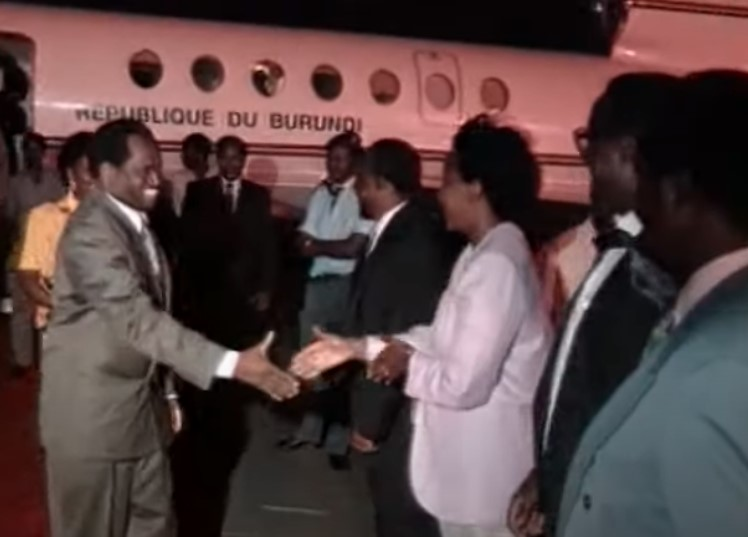
Prime Minister Kinigi greeting President Melchior Ndadaye at Bujumbura airport in 1993

On 21 October President Ndadaye and several other officials were killed by Tutsi soldiers in a coup attempt. A puppet civilian figure, François Ngeze, was presented by military authorities as the new head of state. Kinigi's bodyguards remained loyal to her during the takeover. She and other senior government figures took refuge in the French embassy. She was the highest-ranking civilian official to survive the coup attempt. From the embassy she continued to issue directives on government policy. Buyoya and his predecessor, Jean Baptiste Bagaza, both gave their support to her government and the coup failed due to an outbreak of violence and international condemnation. On 7 November she left the embassy and returned to her residence under French military guard. The death of Ndadaye and others in the presidential line of succession left her de facto head of state of Burundi. (Note: Kinigi appealed to the Constitutional Court for clarification on the status of the vacant presidency following the coup. On 8 November 1993 the Court ruled that "the government acting collegially" assumed the responsibilities of the interim presidency until a new president could be elected.) Tutsi extremists continued to employ violence in the aftermath of the coup, intimidating Kinigi's government and hampering its ability to provide leadership to the country.

Kinigi's government—comprising 15 of the original 22 ministers—stabilised the situation in Bujumbura, the capital, but proved unable to contain the ethnic violence across the country following the coup, in which thousands died. The radical Tutsi UPRONA faction became disgruntled with her actions before and especially during the crisis. With regards to her failure to attend a commemoration for the anniversary of the death of erstwhile UPRONA leader Louis Rwagasore on 13 October, the newspaper Panafrika wrote, "for a prime minister who said she was from Uprona, missing this ceremony was for some 'proof' that Sylvie Kinigi was not from Uprona. Some do not hesitate to say that if it hadn't been for this October 21 coup, she would now be at FRODEBU". The newspaper L’Observateur argued "not having been mandated by UPRONA, knowing simply that she is Prime Minister thanks to God and to Ndadaye and to FRODEBU, the first lady [sic] will behave during the crisis of October 1993 as one would expect. She will be totally absent and when she tries to come forward, it is to tirelessly repeat the theses of FRODEBU". On 15 November she wrote a letter to the Secretary General of the Organisation of African Unity, appealing for a military intervention to restore order in the country. The army and opposition politicians denounced this as a proposal for a "recolonization" of Burundi. In December her government appointed a commission of inquiry led by the Procurator General to investigate human rights abuses that had occurred after the coup, but its work never began due to objections from the parliamentary opposition.

"I wanted peace and normal conditions but my collaborators wanted me to declare a coup d'état! You can't carry on like that. When I managed to get a successor elected in a reasonably acceptable manner, I resigned."

— Kinigi speaking on her role after the coup, 1999

Kinigi, burdened by the leadership responsibility placed upon her by the political vacuum, sought to enable the selection of a new president. On 9 January 1994, at her direction, the National Assembly modified Article 85 of the Burundian constitution, empowering itself to elect the next president of Burundi. Four days later the National Assembly elected Ntaryamira to become president in a vote, 78 to one. Ntaryamira was scheduled to be inaugurated on 22 January, but the parliamentary opposition, led by UPRONA, filed a suit with the Constitutional Court to block the installment. They argued that Article 182 of the constitution, which stipulated that the document could not be modified in times of national crisis, rendered the National Assembly's amending of Article 85 void. FRODEBU parliamentarians argued that the change was necessary to fill the vacancy, since holding a national election to replace the former president would have been impossible. The Constitutional Court ruled in favor of the opposition in a decision split along ethnic lines. The Hutu justices subsequently resigned and on 29 January Kinigi's government issued a decree dismissing the Tutsi justices. This led to several days of violence in Bujumbura. With the assistance of United Nations representative Ahmedou Ould-Abdallah, Kinigi brokered a compromise with the opposition, whereby Ntaryamira would be installed as president with a new UPRONA prime minister, and the Constitutional Court would be reinstated. Ntaryamira was sworn in on 5 February. Kinigi resigned as prime minister when he was inaugurated. On 7 February Ntaryamira appointed Anatole Kanyenkiko to replace her.

Kinigi was the second woman to serve as president of an African country, after Carmen Pereira of Guinea-Bissau, who also held the office in an interim fashion. Opinions on her time in government were starkly divided. Many of her Tutsi contemporaries regarded her as vacuous and a negative influence on the country, with Panafrika denouncing her as "Madame Fiasco". She retained a significant amount of respect among FRODEBU members. Responding to criticism of her leadership, Marc Manirakiza wrote, "What could she have done in the face of an unforeseen and unprecedented chaotic situation?" Reflecting on her time in government in 1999, Kinigi said it made people realise "that a woman can do even more than a man can do, with a soul of a mother and strong will, at the highest level of politics." Linking her to her contemporary in Rwanda, Agathe Uwilingiyimana, political scientist Jane Jansen wrote that the two women "owed their temporary rise to the top to an attempt to find an accommodation to the ethnic conflicts that plagued their respective countries."

=== Later work ===
Upon leaving government, Kinigi assumed an executive position at the Banque Commerciale du Burundi. She then held several international positions, including jobs at the United Nations Educational, Scientific and Cultural Organization, the United Nations Development Programme (representing it in Equatorial Guinea, Cameroon, and Senegal), and the office of the UN Special Envoy for the Great Lakes Region in Nairobi, where she served as a political advisor and programme coordinator. She returned to Burundi in 2008 and became an independent economic consultant. In that capacity she advocated for the right of women to inherit land and property and for the use of democracy. In 2016 the Carter Center selected Kinigi to lead its international election observer mission in Zambia for that year's general elections.

== See also ==
- List of the first women holders of political offices in Africa

== Works cited ==
- Amnesty International Report 1994. London: Amnesty International Publications. 1994. ISBN 978-0-86210-230-2.
- Banks, Arthur S., ed. (1993). Political Handbook of the World: 1993. New York: CQ Press. ISBN 9780933199095.
- Banshimiyubusa, Denis (2018). Les enjeux et défis de la démocratisation au Burundi. Essai d'analyse et d'interprétation à partir des partis politiques [The issues and challenges of democratization in Burundi. Essay of analysis and interpretation from political parties] (PDF) (PhD thesis) (in French). Université Pau et des Pays de l'Adour. OCLC 1085890695 – via HAL.
- Chrétien, Jean-Pierre; Mukuri, Melchior (2002). Burundi, la fracture identitaire: logiques de violence et certitudes ethniques, 1993–1996 (in French). Paris: Karthala Editions. ISBN 978-2-84586-318-7.
- Country Report: Uganda, Rwanda, Burundi. London: The Economist Intelligence Unit. 1994.
- Giraudineau, Laurent (November 1993). "Burundi : La Démocratie Assassinée". Afrique Magazine (in French). No. 108. pp. 24–30, 34.
- Hatungimana, Alexandre (2012). "Kinigi, Sylvie". In Akyeampong, Emmanuel Kwaku; Gates, Henry Louis (eds.). Dictionary of African Biography. Vol. III. New York: Oxford University Press USA. ISBN 978-0-19-538207-5.
- Hoogensen, Gunhild; Solheim, Bruce O. (2006). Women in Power: World Leaders Since 1960. Westport, CT: Greenwood Press. ISBN 978-0-275-98190-7.
- Jansen, J. (2008). Women Political Leaders: Breaking the Highest Glass Ceiling. Basingstoke: Palgrave Macmillan. ISBN 978-0-230-61685-1.
- Krueger, Robert; Krueger, Kathleen Tobin (2007). From Bloodshed to Hope in Burundi : Our Embassy Years During Genocide (PDF). Austin: University of Texas Press. ISBN 978-0-292-71486-1 – via South African History Online.
- Legum, Colin, ed. (1994). Africa Contemporary Record 1992–1994. Vol. XXIV. New York: Africana Publishing Company. ISBN 978-0841905627.
- Skard, Torild (2014). Women of Power : Half a Century of Female Presidents and Prime Ministers Worldwide. Bristol: Policy Press. ISBN 978-1-4473-1578-0.
- Welz, Martin (2021). Africa since Decolonization: The History and Politics of a Diverse Continent. Cambridge: Cambridge University Press. ISBN 978-1-108-62894-5.
- Whitaker's Almanack : 1994 (126th ed.). London: J. Whitaker & Sons. 1993. ISBN 978-0-85021-238-9.

Political offices
Preceded by Adrien Sibomana	Prime Minister of Burundi; 1993–1994	Succeeded by Anatole Kanyenkiko
Preceded by François Ngeze; Acting	President of Burundi; Acting; 1993–1994	Succeeded by Cyprien Ntaryamira
