= Butanyerera =

Province of Burundi

- Province
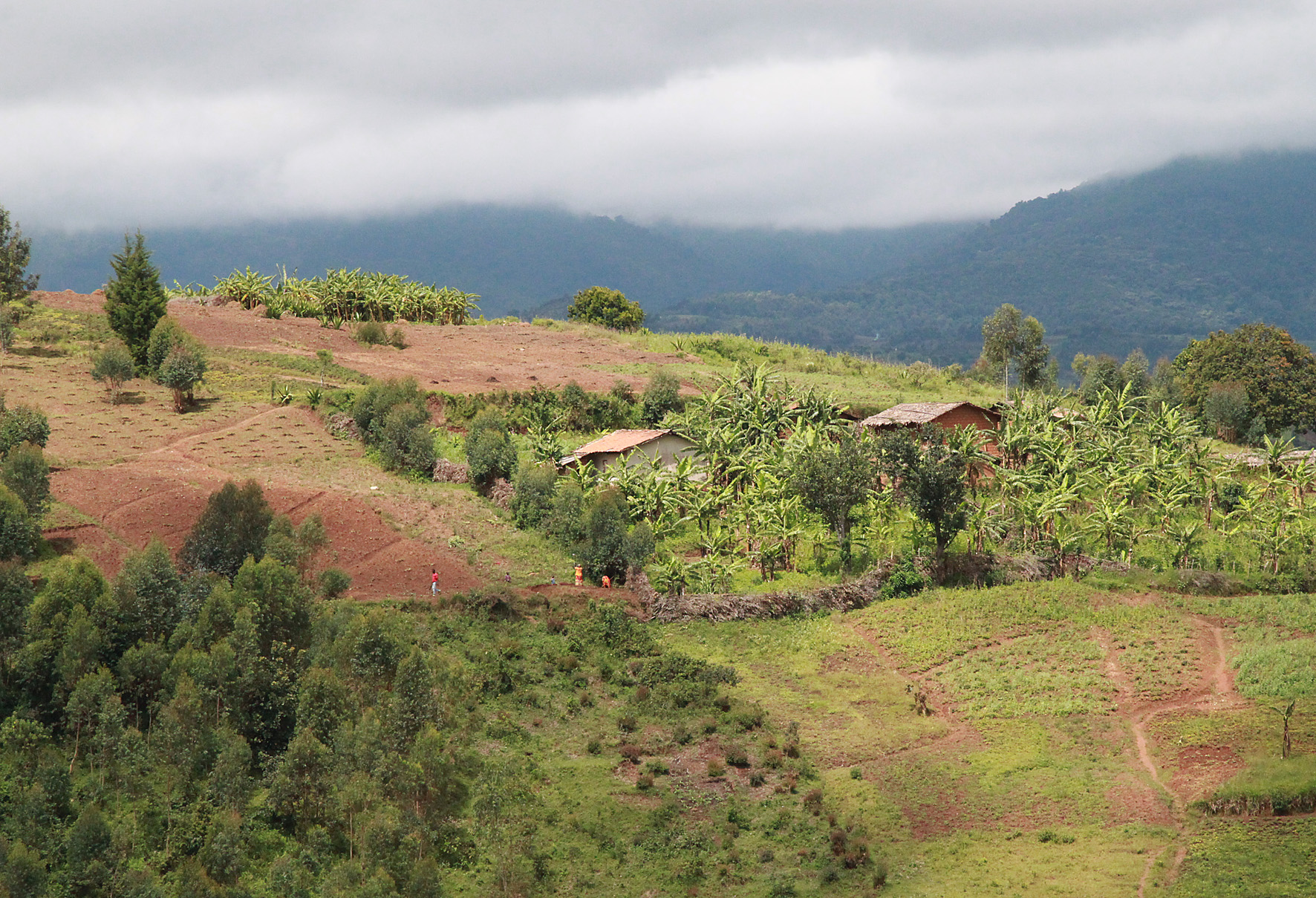
- The zone of Banga in the commune of Matongo in Butanyerera

- Location of Butanyerera in Burundi
- Coordinates: 3°S 30°E
- Country: Burundi
- Inaugurated: 2025
- Capital: Ngozi

Government
  - Governor: Victor Segasago (CNDD-FDD)

Area
  - Total: 4,480 km^{2} (1,730 sq mi)

Population (2024 census)
  - Total: 2,530,206
  - Density: 565/km^{2} (1,460/sq mi)
- Time zone: UTC+2 (CAT)
- Website: https://www.provincebutanyerera.gov.bi/home

Butanyerera is the second most populous of Burundi's five provinces. It covers an area of 4,480 square kilometres (1,730 sq mi) and recorded a population of 2,530,206 in the 2024 Burundian census. The capital and the largest town in the province is Ngozi, which reported a population of 39,884 in the 2008 Burundian census. Other significant towns in Butanyerera include Kayanza and Kirundo, which reported populations of 21,767 and 10,024 respectively in the 2008 Burundian census.

== Geography ==
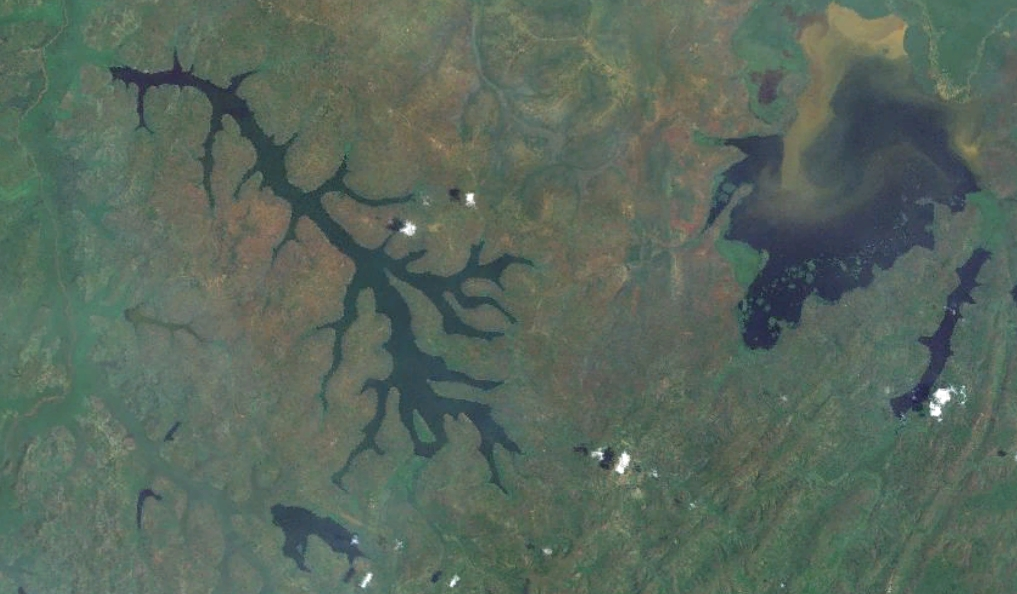
All eight lakes in the Protected Aquatic Landscape of the North Ramsar site are visible in this satellite image taken in 2014. North is at the top of the image. The two largest lakes are the many-branched Lake Cohoha, and Lake Rweru at top right. Both these lakes lie on the border between Burundi and Rwanda. The next largest lakes are Lake Kanzigiri below and to the right (i.e., southeast) of Lake Rweru, and Lake Rwihinda below Lake Cohoha. Below and to the left (i.e., southwest) of Lake Cohoha are the smaller lakes Gacamirindi (green), Nagitamo and Narungazi. The northern tip of Lake Mwungere appears at the bottom left corner of the image.

Located in northern Burundi, Butanyerera borders the Burundian provinces of Bujumbura, Gitega and Buhumuza to the west, south and east respectively, and Rwanda's Southern and Eastern provinces to the northwest and northeast respectively. Terrain in the province ranges in elevation from 1,325 metres (4,347 ft) at Lake Rweru in the Bugesera Depression to the northeast, to over 2,600 metres (8,500 ft) on the Congo-Nile ridge in Kibira National Park in the west. The central part of Butanyerera lies on the Buyenzi plateau, one of Burundi's major coffee-producing regions.

Butanyerera contains the eastern side of Kibira National Park, which protects the Albertine Rift montane forests of the Mugamba natural region. The Protected Aquatic Landscape of the North Ramsar site is located in the northeastern part of Butanyerera near the Rwandan border, and protects Lakes Cohoha, Gacamirindi, Kanzigiri, Mwungere, Nagitamo, Narungazi, Rweru, and Rwihinda, as well as Murehe Forest. Kibira National Park and Lake Rwihinda are on Burundi's list of Tentative World Heritage Sites, as are the royal tombs of Nkiko-Mugamba, located in the zones of Kabarore and Muruta in the commune of Kayanza.

== History ==
On 16 March 2023, President of Burundi Évariste Ndayishimiye signed into law a reorganization of Burundi's administrative divisions, which included the reduction of Burundi's provinces from eighteen to five. Butanyerera was created from the merger of the former provinces of Kayanza, Kirundo and Ngozi, as well as parts of the former commune of Bukeye in the province of Muramvya, namely the zone of Busangana and the collines of Busekera, Kigereka and Shumba in the zone of Bukeye. The new provinces took effect with Burundi's 2025 parliamentary and local elections. Butanyerera's first governor Victor Segasago was sworn in on 4 July 2025.

Butanyerera was previously the name of a chiefdom created in 1959 from the southern part of the chiefdom of Buyenzi in the territory of Ngozi, which Louis Rwagasore briefly administered.

== Communes ==
Butanyerera is divided into eight communes: Busoni, Kayanza, Kiremba, Kirundo, Matongo, Muhanga, Ngozi, and Tangara.
