= List of lakes of Burundi =

This is a list of lakes of Burundi.

== C ==
- Lake Cohoha

== D ==
- Lake Dogodogo

== G ==
- Lake Gacamirindi
- Lake Gitamo

== K ==
- Lake Kanzigiri
- Lake Kayongozi

== R ==
- Lake Mwungere

== N ==
- Lake Narungazi
- Lake Nyamuziba

== R ==
- Lake Rwegura
- Lake Rweru
- Lake Rwihinda

== T ==
- Lake Tanganyika
