= Murehe Forest =

Protected landscape area in Burundi

Murehe Forest French: Forêt de Murehe
- Location within Burundi
- Interactive map of Murehe Forest

Geography
- Location: Kirundo Province, Burundi
- Coordinates: 2.3800°S 30.2325°E
- Area: 3,075 ha (7,600 acres)

The Murehe Forest (French: Forêt de Murehe; 2.3800°S 30.2325°E) is an area of forest in the north of the Kirundo Province of Burundi. It is protected by the Murehe Reserve (French: Réserve de Murehe), part of the Lacs du Nord Aquatic Landscape.

== Location ==
The Victoria Basin forest–savanna mosaic centers around Lake Victoria and extends through parts of Uganda, Kenya, Tanzania, Rwanda, and Burundi. The portion of this ecosystem in Burundi in limited to the northeast, and includes the Ruvubu National Park and the Murehe Forest Reserve.

The Muhere Forest is in the north of Kirundo Province, to the west of Lake Rweru and east of the RN 14 highway, which crosses into Rwanda to the north of Gasenyi. It is in the Commune of Busoni in the collines of Munazi, Kivo, Yanza, Gatete and Vyanzo. The collines of Muhere have the form of domes separated by small valleys. The highest points are 1,565 metres (5,135 ft) above sea level, and the lowlands are 1,327 to 1,343 metres (4,354 to 4,406 ft) above sea level.

== Protection ==
The Managed Reserve of Lake Rwihinda, covering 425 hectares (1,050 acres), was created by a decree of 1980, protecting the birds on this lake. In 1993 it was suggested that protection should be extended to the Muhere Forest. However, only one guard was assigned to monitor what he called the Murehe Reserve, at that time thought to cover over 6,000 hectares (15,000 acres). A plan for a Northern Aquatic Landscape (Paysage Aquatique du Nord) was issued in 2005, proposing to create a Protected Aquatic Landscape and a Strict Nature Reserve from Murehe to Bugesera.

The Lacs du Nord Aquatic Landscape Protected Area was created in 2006, expanding on the Lake Rwihinda protected area. In theory this conserves over 30,000 hectares (74,000 acres) of aquatic environment with integrated community management, agricultural production, and lake conservation. It includes the integrated Natural Reserve of Murehe; the managed Reserves of Lake Rwihinda, Lake Rweru and Lake Cohoha, and the integrated protected zones of Lake Gacamirinda, Lake Mwungere, Lake Nagitamo, and Lake Kanzigiri. However, coltan and cassiterite extraction have been reported in the Murehe Reserve, which degrades fish habitat in the nearby lakes. The Murehe forest is also threatened by encroachment.

The total area of the Protected Northern Aquatic Landscape covered by the Ramsar Convention is 16,242 hectares (40,130 acres), including eight lakes and the Murehe Reserve, which now covers just 3,075 hectares (7,600 acres). The protected landscape was formally created by decree on 12 April 2011. The Kagera Aquatic Zone's Management Plan issued in 2011 aims to improve management of the lakes and marshlands, and of the vegetation in the Murehe Forest area. Lake Mwungere is considered an Integral Zone under this plan, which includes lake Gacamirina and Lake Nagitamo, and marshlands in the secondary valleys of the Akanyaru River. Human influence should be excluded from the zone by a 50 metres (160 ft) belt to protect the natural species.

== Sources ==
- Burundi Environmental Threats and Opportunities Assessment (ETOA) (PDF), United States Agency for International Development (USAID), September 2010, archived from the original (PDF) on February 22, 2017
- Décret n°100-114 du 12 avril 2011 portant délimitation du paysage aquatique protégé du nord., Food and Agriculture Organization, 12 April 2011
- Fiche descriptive sur les zones humides Ramsar (FDR) (PDF) (in French), 14 March 2013
- Kagera TAMP - Bugesera aquatic landscapes endowed with a management plan, Kirundo province, Burundi: FAO, 8 July 2011
- "Node: Foret de Murehe (6852606514)", OpenStreetMap, 4 October 2019
- Nzigidahera, Benoît; Fofo, Alphonse; Misigaro, Apollinaire (August 2005), Paysage Aquatique Protege du Nord du Burundi – Etude D'identification (PDF) (in French)
- "Paysage Aquatique du Nord : Etude d'identification", Biodiversité du Burundi (in French), 1 July 2005
- USAID/Burundi Foreign Assistance Act Sections 118/119 Tropical Forests and Biodiversity Analysis (PDF), June 2022, archived from the original (PDF) on August 1, 2023
