= Protected Aquatic Landscape of the North =

- Paysage Aquatique Protégé du Nord
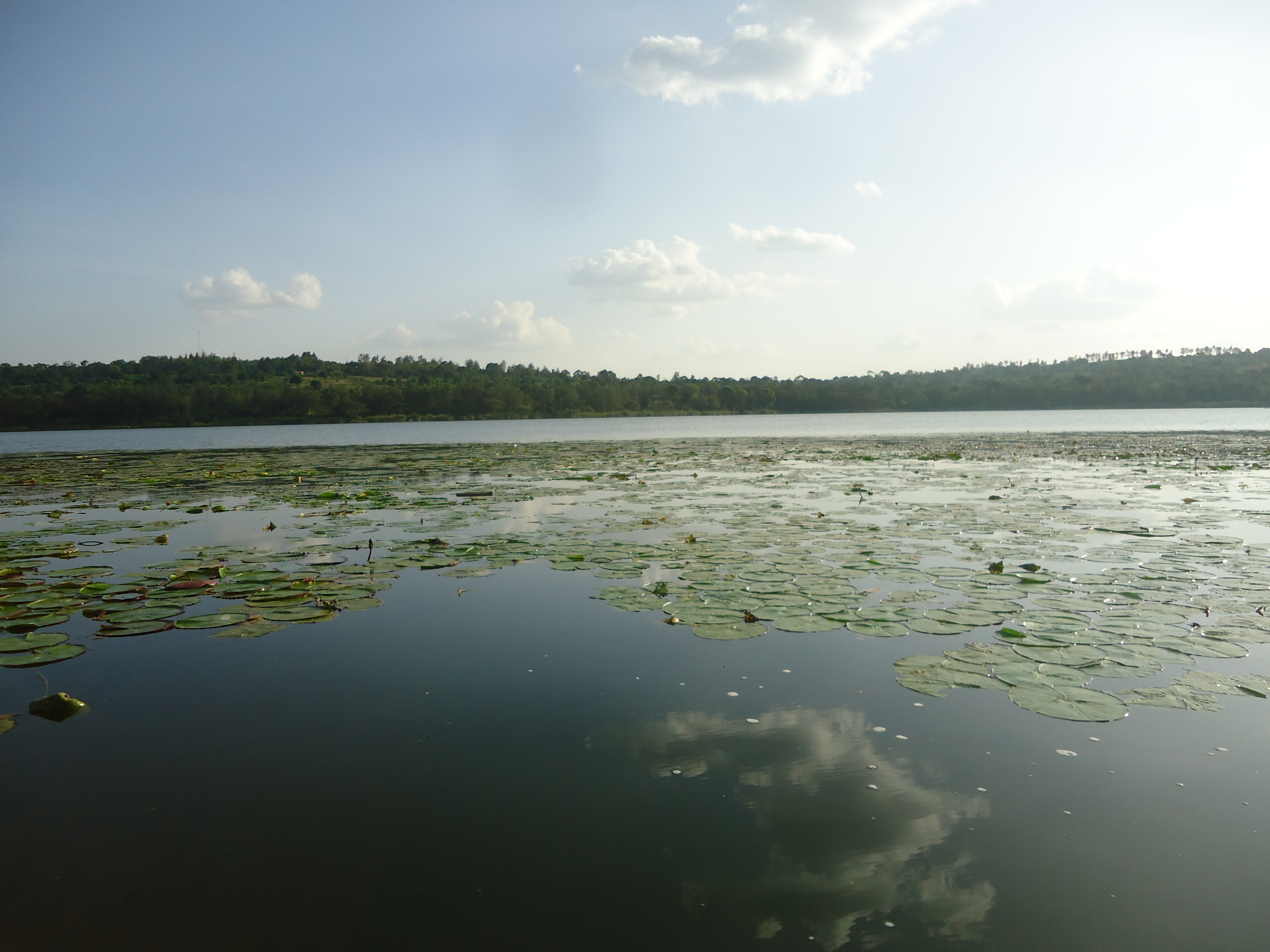
- Water lilies on Lake Rwihinda

- Location within Burundi
- Location: Kirundo Province, Burundi.
- Nearest city: Muyinga
- Coordinates: 2.4492°S 30.1001°E
- Area: 40,130 ha (154.9 sq mi)
- Created: 12 April 2011

The Protected Aquatic Landscape of the North (French: Paysage Aquatique Protégé du Nord), also called the Northern Protected Waterway or Northern Protected Waterscape, is a protected area in Kirundo Province, Burundi. It covers eight lakes in the north of the province, and a forest. It was designated Ramsar site no. 2149 in March 2014.

== Location ==
The Protected Aquatic Landscape of the North is in the Bugesera Depression ecological zone of Burundi. It has an average altitude of 1,350 to 1,400 metres (4,430 to 4,590 ft) and includes very rounded hills up to 1,500 metres (4,900 ft) high. In the valley floor, vast marshes sheltering Cyperus papyrus are interspersed by lakes. Lake Rweru (7140 ha) and Lake Kanzigiri (750 ha) are in the eastern part of the Bugesera Depression. Lake Rweru is connected to Lake Kanzigiri through a valley filled with swamps. There is a natural savannah, the Murehe Forest (3075 ha) in the watershed of Lake Rweru.

In the western part of the Bugesera Depression, the marshy valley of the upper Akanyaru River is 200 metres (660 ft) to 4 kilometres (2.5 mi) wide, 70 kilometres (43 mi) long, with an estimated area of 200 square kilometres (77 sq mi). The Akanyaru River winds through a cyperus papyrus swamp. The tributaries of the lower course of the Akanyaru are all marshy and the lakes of its drainage basin are located in the tributary valleys. The lakes are, from upstream to downstream, Lake Cohoha: 4,500 hectares (11,000 acres), Lake Gacamirindi: 250 hectares (620 acres), Lake Gitamo: 21 hectares (52 acres), Lake Rwihinda: 425 hectares (1,050 acres), Lake Naruganzi: 61 hectares (150 acres) and Lake Mwungere: 20 hectares (49 acres).

The lakes are marshy, with an average depth of 2.5 to 5 metres (8 ft 2 in to 16 ft 5 in). All eight lakes are important bird habitats, with 60 species identified in Lake Rwihinda alone. They provide a variety of fish to the surrounding populations. The wetlands leading out of and into many of the lakes are irrigated for rice and sugar cane fields, and the surrounding hillsides are developed for diverse agricultural production.

A study of the area to be protected, issued in August 2005, said that the lakes, marshes and forests of northern Burundi were being severely over-exploited by the local people, and sometimes there were conflicts between people and authorities over this exploitation. Rapid population growth, poor farming practices and deforestation were causing damage to the marshes. The water level of some lakes had dropped significantly, and some had disappeared. In the Murehe Forest there were conflicts between officials, refugees, returnees and the Batwa ethnic group, large areas had been cleared to grow sorghum and beans, and trees were used as fuel to dry tobacco.

== Earlier conservation history ==
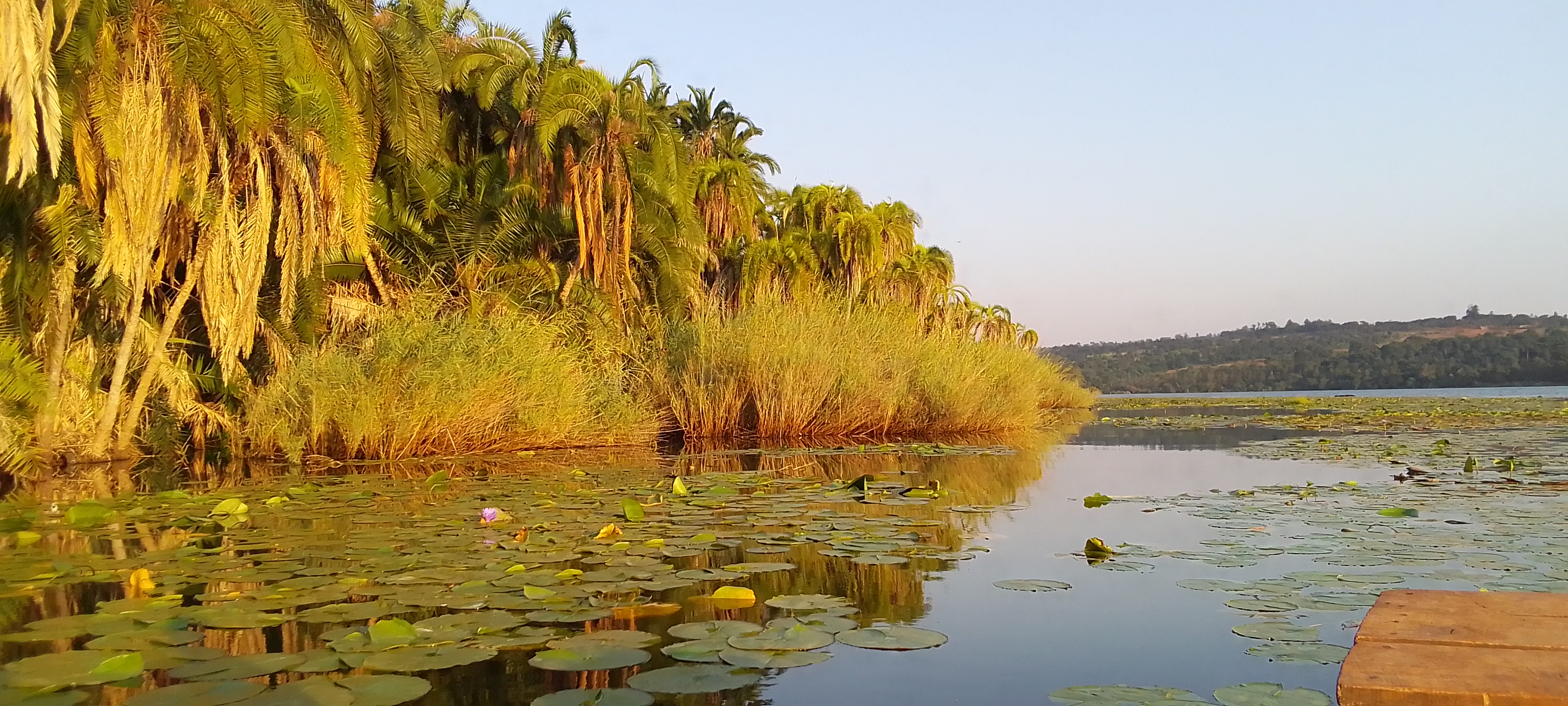
Trees beside Lake Rwihinda

Decree-law No. 1/6 of 3 March 1980 defined the legal framework for creation of national parks and nature reserves in Burundi. The Lake Rwihinda Managed Reserve was created in this context. Decree-law No. 100/47 of the same date, created the National Institute for Nature Conservation (INCN) to implement decree-law No. 1/6, and placed it under the direct authority of the Presidency of the Republic. Decree-Law No. 100/188 of 5 October 1989, reorganized the INCN as the National Institute for the Environment and Nature Conservation (INECN). It is responsible for overall protection of the environment in Burundi, but is under the supervision of the Ministry of Territorial Planning, Environment and Tourism.

Decree-law No. 100/007 of 25 January 2000 relating to the delimitation of protected areas recognized the Lake Rwihinda Managed Reserve as a protected area requiring strict protection measures in the same way as other protected areas, although it did not yet have legal boundaries. The Environmental Code (Law No. 1/010 of June 30, 2000) included a section relating to biological diversity, which sets out provisions aimed at protection of fauna, flora and biodiversity by prohibiting attacks on natural environments and animal and plant resources. The Code also provides for the possibility of instituting special protection measures by creation of "integral reserves" with a view to further strengthening the conservation of species which are particularly threatened or in danger of disappearing.

The precursor "Lacs du Nord Aquatic Landscape Protected Area" was created in 2006, in theory conserving over 30,000 hectares (74,000 acres), or 14.2 of Burundi's interior waters, up from 0.2%. The stated goals were integrated community management, agricultural production, and lake conservation. The protected aquatic landscape integrated the integrated Natural Reserve of Murehe; the managed Reserves of Lake Rwihinda, Lake Rweru and Lake Cohoha; and the integrated protected zones of Lakes Gacamirinda, Mwungere, Nagitamo, and Kanzigiri.

== Protected Aquatic Landscape ==
The Paysage aquatique protégé du Nord in the Province of Kirundo was created by decret no. 100/114 of 12 April 2011. It covers lakes Rwihinda, Narungazi, Mwungere, Gitamo, Gacamirindi, Cohoha, Rweru, Kanzigiri and the Murehe Forest. The site is in the Bugesera Natural Region, in Kirundo Province and borders Rwanda to the north. The closest major cities are Muyinga, 45 kilometres (28 mi) away, Bujumbura, 125 kilometres (78 mi) to the southwest and Gitega, 100 kilometres (62 mi) to the south. The total area of the Protected Aquatic Landscape of the North is 16,242 hectares (40,130 acres), including eight lakes and the Murehe Reserve, which now covers just 3,075 hectares (7,600 acres).

== Management plan ==
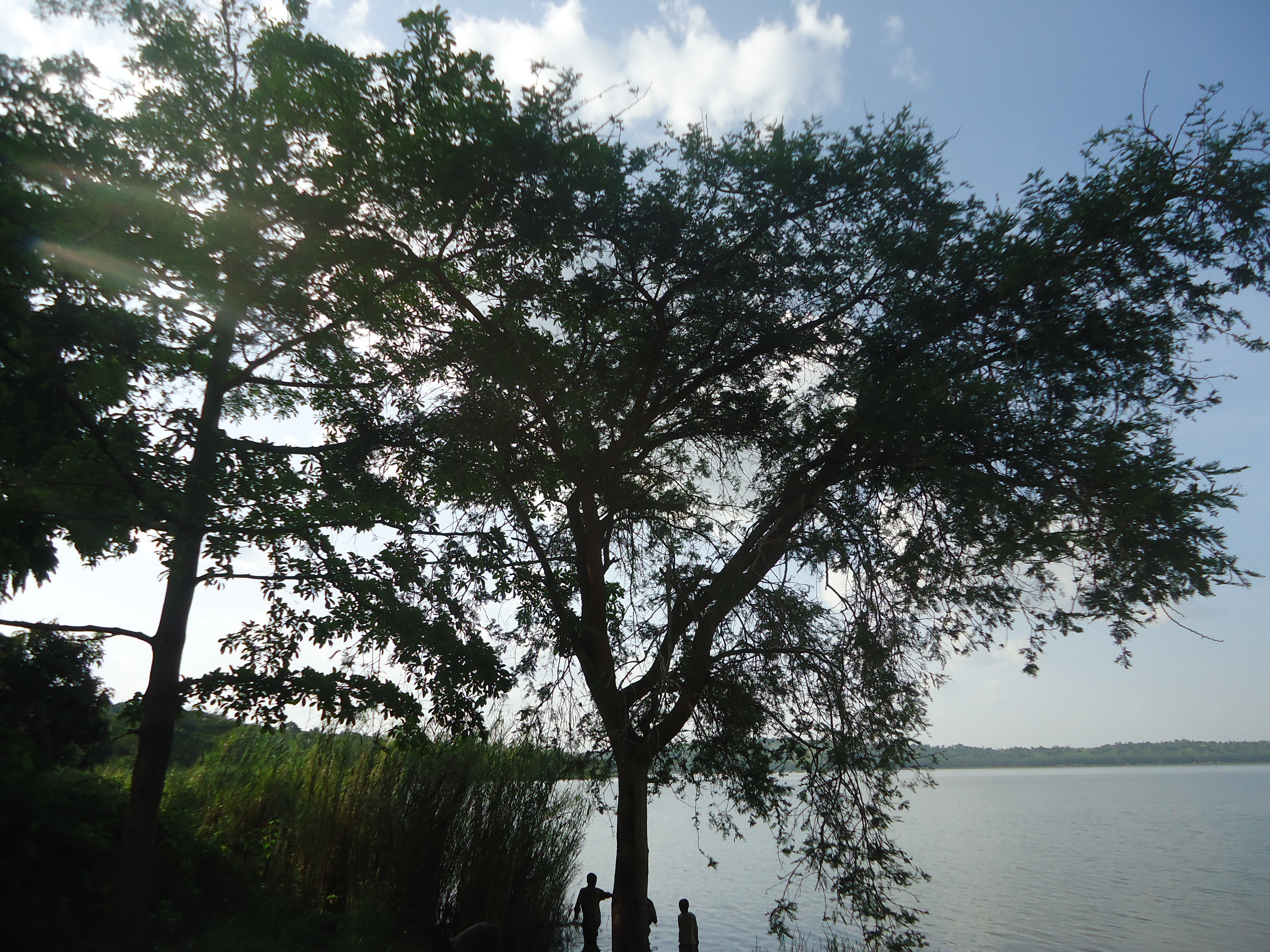
Lake Rwihinda

On 8 July 2011 a management plan for the Bugesera aquatic landscapes was validated in a workshop in Kirundo attended by officials of the Ministry of Agriculture and Ministry of the Environment, local elected leaders and environmental experts. The plan aimed to conserve and improve the biodiversity of the lakes and marshlands, and of the Murehe forest, to preserve the cultural, scientific and touristic value of Burundi's landscapes, and to involve the local people in managing the ecosystems of the Bugesera region. Several different types of protected areas were defined:

- "Protected Aquatic Areas" include marshland and collines, allowing access and use by people, respecting traditional land use approaches
- "Integrated Natural Reserves" exclude all human activities to allow vegetation to regenerate and grow naturally
- "Managed Natural Reserves" cover lakes Rweru, Rwihinda and Kanzigiri, where sustainable fishing is allowed, birds will be encouraged to return, and water hyacinth and other weeds will be eliminated
- "Integral Zones" cover lakes Gacamirina, Nagitamo and Mwungere and the marshlands in tributary valleys of Akanyaru river that connect with all the lakes, and notably with Nyavyamo Marsh and Ruduhira Marsh. Human presence would be phased out

Buffer zones, or belts of land at least 50 metres (160 ft) wide, would be established around "Managed Natural Reserves" and "Integral Zones"

A 2022 USAID report noted that the lakes have been invaded by water hyacinth on a large scale, which has crowded out native vegetation and reduced fish stocks. Burundi has done little to remove the hyacinths. In October 2023 the Inades-Formation Burundi held a workshop on water resource management with local leaders in the capital of Kirundo Province to celebrate World Food Day. It was noted that although the 2012 water code encouraged good practices and penalized violations, some of the lakes still suffered from pollution and unsustainable illegal fishing.

== List of protected units ==
Protected units are:

Unit	Type	Location	Area	
Unit	Type	Location	ha	acre
Lake Rweru	Managed Natural Reserve	2°23′30″S 30°20′00″E	7,140	17,600
Lake Kanzigiri	Managed Natural Reserve	2°27′00″S 30°21′36″E	750	1,900
Lake Cohoha	Managed Natural Reserve	2°26′24″S 30°06′36″E	4,500	11,000
Lake Gacamirindi	Integral Zone	2°27′00″S 30°00′00″E	250	620
Lake Rwihinda	Managed Natural Reserve	2°32′22″S 30°03′15″E	425	1,050
Lake Gitamo	Integral Zone	2°31′10″S 30°03′15″E	21	52
Lake Narungazi	Integral Zone	2°33′10″S 30°03′25″E	61	150
Lake Mwungere	Integral Zone	2°36′15″S 30°03′10″E	20	49
Murehe Forest	Integral Natural Reserve	2°23′24″S 30°15′00″E	3,075	7,600
Total			16,242	40,130

== Ramsar site ==
On 14 March 2013 the Paysage Aquatique Protégé du Nord was designated Ramsar Site no. 2149. Criteria include:

- The landscape is one of the rare sites in Burundi visited by the Malagasy pond heron (Ardeola idae), an endangered species (EN) as indicated on the IUCN Red List. It is one of the rare places in Burundi where we find the Royal crane (Balearica regulorum), ecologically threatened in Burundi (marked EN according to the IUCN Red List, and listed in Appendix II of CITES). The site also contains endemic and threatened fish species such as Synodontis ruandae (VU) and Labeobarbus acuticeps (EN). A population of 4 hippopotamus persists in Lake Rweru.
- The lakes play an important role as habitats for both migratory and sedentary birds. Migratory birds coming from Europe towards South Africa and Asia rest at the site. According to an inventory made in Lake Rwihinda alone, more than 60 species are known, including remarkable species such as Reed cormorant Phalacrocorax africanus, Gambian Spur-winged goose Plectropterus gambensis, Great white pelican Pelecanus onocrotalus and Little egret Egretta garzetta. The site also supports many animal species in all their life cycles from reproduction to growth.
- Of the 20 species of fish in the northern lakes, 12 are indigenous, including 2 endemic to the Akagera sub-basin, Labeobarbus acuticeps and Synodontis ruandae. The site is therefore home to a significant proportion of native species at different stages of their life cycle, from daily feeding to reproduction.

== Sources ==
- Burundi Environmental Threats and Opportunities Assessment (ETOA) (PDF), United States Agency for International Development (USAID), September 2010, archived from the original (PDF) on February 22, 2017
- Décret n°100-114 du 12 avril 2011 portant délimitation du paysage aquatique protégé du nord., Food and Agriculture Organization, 12 April 2011
- Fiche descriptive sur les zones humides Ramsar (FDR) (PDF) (in French), 14 March 2013
- Havyarimana, Richard (7 November 2023), World Food Day in Burundi: Involving all stakeholders for the survival of the northern lakes, Inades-Formation Burundi
- Kagera TAMP - Bugesera aquatic landscapes endowed with a management plan, Kirundo province, Burundi: FAO, 8 July 2011
- Nzigidahera, Benoît; Fofo, Alphonse; Misigaro, Apollinaire (August 2005), Paysage Aquatique Protege du Nord du Burundi – Etude D'identification (PDF) (in French)
- Nzigidahera, Benoît; Fofo, Alphonse (March 2005b), Réserve Gérée du Lac Rwihinda: Plan de gestion (PDF), INECN
- USAID/Burundi Foreign Assistance Act Sections 118/119 Tropical Forests and Biodiversity Analysis (PDF), June 2022, archived from the original (PDF) on August 1, 2023
