= Lake Mwungere =

Lake in Burundi

- Lac Mwungere
- Location within Burundi
- Location: Kirundo Province of Burundi
- Coordinates: 2°34′43″S 29°56′48″E

Lake Mwungere (2°34′43″S 29°56′48″E) is a lake in the Kirundo Province of Burundi.

== Location ==
Lake Mwungere is in the Commune of Ntega in Kirundo Province near the villages of Mariza and Mugina. It is connected by wetlands to the Akanyaru River. The Köppen climate classification is Aw: Tropical savanna, wet.

== Conservation ==
Lake Mwungere is in the Lacs du Nord Aquatic Landscape Protected Area, created in 2006, which in theory conserves more than 30,000 hectares (74,000 acres) of lakes and wetlands with the goal of integrated community management, agricultural production, and lake conservation. The lake is part of the Northern Protected Waterway, a 162.42 square kilometres (62.71 sq mi) complex of 8 permanent freshwater lakes including lakes Rweru, Cohoha, Rwihinda, Kanzigiri, Gacamirindi, Nagitamo, Narungazi and Mwungere as well as marshes, that form part of the Nile Basin. These lakes are dominated by small Tilapia and Oreochromis species. They have been the site of largescale invasions of water hyacinth, which has greatly decreased production and reduced fish stocks, as well as crowded out native vegetation. Burundi has taken little effort to remove the invasive species.

The Kagera Aquatic Zone's Management Plan aims to improve management of the lakes, marshlands and vegetation in the Murehe Forest area. Lake Mwungere is considered an Integral Zone under this plan, which includes lakes Gacamirina and Nagitamo, and marshlands in the secondary valleys of the Akanyaru River. Human influence should be excluded from the zone by a 50 metres (160 ft) belt to protect the natural species. In November 2021 Albert Hatungimana, Governor of Kirundo, praised the achievements of Inades-Formation Burundi in creating buffer zones for the Nagitamo, Mwungere and Gacamirinda lakes. The protective belt includes trees, anti-erosion ditches with fixation grasses above them, and a canal separating the buffer zone from private properties. Fish production and water quality has improved in the protected lakes as a result.

== Sources ==
- Burundi Environmental Threats and Opportunities Assessment (ETOA) (PDF), United States Agency for International Development (USAID), September 2010, archived from the original (PDF) on February 22, 2017
- Kagera TAMP - Bugesera aquatic landscapes endowed with a management plan, Kirundo province, Burundi: FAO, 8 July 2011
- "Lac Mwungere, Kirundo Province, Burundi", Mindat
- Towards ownership of the achievements of the TAPSA project by the local administration of Bugabira and Ntega communes, Inades-Formation Burundi, 29 November 2021
- USAID/Burundi Foreign Assistance Act Sections 118/119 Tropical Forests and Biodiversity Analysis (PDF), June 2022, archived from the original (PDF) on August 1, 2023
- "Way: Lac Mwungere (299661662)", OpenStreetMap
