= Commune of Bugabira =

- Commune
- Location within Burundi
- Coordinates: 2.436°S 30.0351°E
- Country: Burundi
- Province: Kirundo Province

Area
  - Total: 90.8 sq mi (235.3 km^{2})

Population (2008)
  - Total: 89,259
- Time zone: UTC+2 (Central Africa Time)

The commune of Bugabira is a commune of Kirundo Province in northern Burundi. The capital is Bugabira. There are health centers at Muyange and Ruhehe.

== Location ==
The Commune of Bugabira is bordered by Rwanda to the northwest and northeast, by the Commune of Ntega to the southeast and by the Commune of Kirundo to the southwest. It has an area of 235 square kilometres (91 sq mi). It had a population of 628,256 as of the 2008 census.

== Environment ==
Elevations in the commune range are from 1,000 to 1,500 metres (3,300 to 4,900 ft) above sea level. Ferralitic lithosols in the area are acidic, partly weathered and general low in fertility. The lower valleys have organosols with higher fertility. The Köppen climate classification is Aw: Tropical savanna, wet. Mean annual temperature is 20.5 °C (68.9 °F). There is sparse forest cover. Between 2001 and 2023 Bugabira commune lost 29 hectares (72 acres) of tree cover, 1.7% of the tree cover that was present in 2000.

Rainfall of 800 to 1,200 millimetres (31 to 47 in) per year is irregular and has been diminishing, causing shallow water sources to dry up and agricultural production output to fall. Bugabira is surrounded by Lake Gacamirinda, Kanyaru River and Lake Cohoha. However, there is poor access to drinking water. Other lakes include Lake Narungazi and Lake Gitamo.

Lake Gacamirindi covers an area of 250 hectares (620 acres), and is set between hills with fairly steep slopes. It is surrounded by the densely populated collines of Kiri and Nyakarama. In the past the lake merged into a marshy area beside the Akanyaru River. Now banana and sorghum are cultivated both upstream and downstream of the lake. Lake Gacamirindi would normally be fed by the waters of the Akanyaru river, but as of 2011 was separated from this river by farmland and had become a small pond of a few hectares. Typha domingensis forms a very narrow belt around this pond, separating the crops and the water.

Lake Gitamo empties into a marshy corridor that leads from Lake Rwihinda and Lake Narungazi to the Akanyaru River. It is south of Lake Gacamirindi, which also drains to the Akanyaru River. Ruhehe is to the north-northwest. Lake Gitamo covers 21 hectares (52 acres).

== Population ==
Bugabira commune is divided into the collines of Kiri, Kiyonza, Gaturanda, Rubuga, Kigina, Nyakarama, Nyamabuye, Nyabikenke, Rugasa, Gitwe and Kigoma. The 2008 census reported a population of 89,259, mostly employed in agriculture. Cash crops are over 70% wheat and about 20% teff, with crops such as finger millet, peanut and sweet potato making up the rest. Farm livestock include about 60% goats, 25% cattle, under 10% hens and small percentages of horses, pigs and donkeys.

In 2019 a study of 1286 children in Kabore, Bugabira and Gisuna with average age of 4.8 years measured International Development and Early Learning Assessment (IDELA) scores. Total scores were 30%, with motor scores highest and emergent literacy scores lowest. In 2012 the Global Water Partnership Eastern Africa gathered data related to drought in Rubuga, Kigina, and Gaturanda in Bugabira commune. In 2021 and again in 2022 dozens of collines in the Bugabira, Busoni, Kirundo and Ntega communes of Kirundo experienced a shortage of rain during the period when the bean, corn and sorghum crops were flowering and ripening, affecting over 200,000 people. Many men left the affected areas in search of work, leaving the elderly, disabled, women and children behind.

A March 2021 report on the environmental and social impact of a project to develop schools in Ruhehe and other locations noted that a rainwater collection system would be needed at Ruhehe because it is unusual to have a public drinking water supply in the region, and even if available the network would not supply water. The site of the school is 2 kilometres (1.2 mi) from the capital of Bugabira commune, and is owned by the commune. It would include six classrooms, an administrative block, two blocks of drainable latrines and rainwater sanitation works. In 2023 Bugabira municipality issued a call for tenders for extension of the Gaturanda health center..

In August 2014 six houses were burned in Bugabira commune, including five in Gaturanda and one in Kigoma. In April 2016 Gaston Sindimwo, Vice-President of Burundi, visited Gaturanda, which lies on the border with Rwanda, to ask the people not to stir up problems over refugees.

== Sources ==
- Bigirimana, Christian; Bukeyeneza, Armel-Gilbert (25 August 2014), "Kirundo : incendies criminels à Bugabira", IWACU
- "Bugabira, Kirundo Province, Burundi", Mindat
- "BURUNDI: Administrative Division", City Population
- "Burundi / Kirundo / Bugabira", GADM
- Décret n°100-114 du 12 avril 2011 portant délimitation du paysage aquatique protégé du nord., Food and Agriculture Organization, 12 April 2011
- EDF—electrification of 25 health centres in the provinces of Kirundo, Muyinga, Cankuzo, Ruyigi and Rutana in Burundi 'publisher=Mercell Norge AS
- Fiche descriptive sur les zones humides Ramsar (FDR) (PDF) (in French), 14 March 2013
- Landry Rukundo (28 February 2020), "ThePoliticianWeWant: Bugabira, between a rock and a hard place", Yaga
- Ndayizamba, Prudence (March 2021), Etude D'impact Environnemental Et Social Pour Les Travaux De Construction Des Infrastructures Scolaires Du Lycee Communal Cankuzo (Commune Cankuzo), De L'ecole Primaire Masama (Commune Nyamurenza), Ecole Fondamentale Carubambo, Ecole Technique Nyamurenza (Commune Nyamurenza), Ecofo Ruhehe (Commune Bugabira). (PDF) (in French)
- Nzigidahera, Benoît; Fofo, Alphonse; Misigaro, Apollinaire (August 2005), Paysage Aquatique Protege du Nord du Burundi – Etude D'identification (PDF) (in French)
- Risper Nyairo; Takashi Machimura; Takanori Matsui (24 May 2020), "A Combined Analysis of Sociological and FarmbManagement Factors Affecting Household Livelihood Vulnerability to Climate Change in Rural Burundi", Sustainability, 12 (10): 4296, doi:10.3390/su12104296
- United States. Foreign Broadcast Information Service (1982). Sub-Saharan Africa report. Foreign Broadcast Information Service.
- UN Humanitarian (23 February 2022), Burundi: 200,000 people affected by lack of rain need assistance, OCHA
- "Way: Lac Gitamo (125766573)", OpenStreetMap
