= Gasenyi, Burundi =

- Village
- Location within Burundi
- Coordinates: 2.3754744°S 30.2219352°E
- Country: Burundi
- Province: Kirundo Province
- Commune: Commune of Busoni
- Time zone: UTC+2 (Central Africa Time)

Gasenyi is a village in the Commune of Busoni, Kirundo Province in northern Burundi, the center of the Gasenyi colline and the Gasenyi zone.

== Location ==
Gasenyi is in the north of Busoni commune on the RN14 highway just south of the border with Rwanda. It is west of Lake Rweru, just west of Murehe Forest and east of Lake Cohoha. Gasenyi-Nemba is a border crossing between Burundi and Rwanda.

== Events ==
In 2008 the OPEC Fund for International Development announced a project to build a paved road running 37 kilometres (23 mi) from the city of Kirundo to Gasenyi and the border with Rwanda. The project would also includes upgrades to feeder roads and social infrastructure.

In 2009–2010 the region was hit by drought. In February 2010 as many as 500 people daily would travel from the Gasenyi zone to Rwanda to work, often earning just enough to feed themselves and their family.

In August 2020 the Minister of Public Health and the Fight against AIDS, the Minister of the Interior, Community Development and Public Security, the governor of Kirundo province and the United Nations High Commissioner for Refugees (UNHCR) delegate in Burundi welcome a convoy of 493 Burundian refugees repatriated from the Mahama Refugee Camp in Rwanda to the Gasenyi-Nemba border.

In April 2022 two convoys with 817 Burundian refugees crossed from Rwanda at Gasenyi-Nemba. One convoy was of urban refugees from different cities in Rwanda, and the other was of refugees who had been staying in the Mahama and Gatore refugee camps. The number of returnees in 2022 was around one quarter of the numbers in 2021. 70% of the refugees were from Kirundo province.

== Sources ==
- 817 Burundians were repatriated from Rwanda, ABP: Burundi News Agency, 22 April 2022
- IRIN News (23 February 2010), Drought leaves thousands needing food aid, The New Humanitarian
- Kirundo-Gasenyi Road Project, OPEC Fund for International Development, 2008
- Nduwimana, Evelyne (28 August 2020), Mission de supervision du Ministre de la Santé Publique et de la Lutte contre le Sida, Ministre de la Santé Publique et de la Lutte contre le Sida
- "Node: Gasenyi (3042995151)", OpenStreetMap
