= Nyamabuno Marsh =

Marsh in Burundi

- Marais de la Nyamabuno
- Location within Burundi
- Location: Kirundo Province of Burundi
- Coordinates: 2.39583°S 30.37917°E
- Type: Wetland

Nyamabuno Marsh (French: Marais de la Nyavyamo; 2.39583°S 30.37917°E) is a marsh in the northeast of Kirundo Province, Burundi.

== Location ==
Nyamabuno Marsh is where boundaries of the Commune of Busoni to the west, the Commune of Bwambarangwe in the center and the Commune of Muyinga to the east converge. Its northern end lies between Lake Rweru to the north, which extends from Burindi into Rwanda, and Lake Kanzigiri to the south. The Köppen climate classification is Aw : Tropical savanna, wet. Before being cut in half by a road, the Nyamabuno marsh was more than 400 metres (1,300 ft) wide and over 15 kilometres (9.3 mi) long.

== Exploitation ==
In 2005 a road about 400 metres (1,300 ft) was being built from Karambo in Kirundo Province to Ruzo, Muyinga Province through the Ruduhira marsh. The road cuts the marsh in two. The right part retains the Nyamabuno name, while the left part is called Ruduhira Marsh. The Nyamabuno and Ruduhira marshes drain the waters of Lake Rweru in the Vumasi, Rusenyi, Karambo and Nonwe watersheds.

By 2005 the start of agricultural clearing of these two marshes for rice cropping could be seen of both sides of the road. The road had caused water levels to drop, letting the local population start cultivating rice in the marsh. The road will cause progressive drying of the marsh and lowering of the lake levels. The administrator of the Bwambarangwe commune said in 2005 that an Agricultural Rehabilitation and Support Project (PRASAB) to exploit the Nyamabuno marsh had begun.

== Sources ==
- "Nyamabuno, Burundi", Mindat
- Nzigidahera, Benoît; Fofo, Alphonse; Misigaro, Apollinaire (August 2005), Paysage Aquatique Protege du Nord du Burundi – Etude D'identification (PDF) (in French)
- "Way: Nyamabuno (749089751)", OpenStreetMap
