= Ruduhira Marsh =

Marsh in Burundi

- Marais de Ruduhira
- Location within Burundi
- Location: Kirundo Province of Burundi
- Coordinates: 2.39583°S 30.37917°E
- Type: Wetland

Ruduhira Marsh (French: Marais de Ruduhira; 2.39583°S 30.37917°E) is a marsh in the northeast of Kirundo Province, Burundi.

== Location ==
Before being cut in half by a road, the Nyamabuno Marsh was more than 400 metres (1,300 ft) wide and over 15 kilometres (9.3 mi) long. In 2005 a road about 400 metres (1,300 ft) was being built from Karambo in Kirundo Province to Ruzo, Muyinga Province through the Ruduhira marsh. The road cuts the marsh in two. The right part retains the Nyamabuno name, while the left part is called Ruduhira Marsh. The Nyamabuno and Ruduhira marshes drain the waters of Lake Rweru in the Vumasi, Rusenyi, Karambo and Nonwe watersheds.

== Exploitation ==
By 2005 the start of agricultural clearing of these two marshes for rice cropping could be seen of both sides of the road. The road had caused water levels to drop, letting the local population start cultivating rice in the marsh. The road will cause progressive drying of the marshes and lowering of the lake levels. The administrator of the Bwambarangwe commune said in 2005 that an Agricultural Rehabilitation and Support Project (PRASAB) to exploit the Nyamabuno marsh had begun.

== Protection ==
The Management and development plan for the Protected Aquatic Landscape of Bugesera was published in September 2009. It was validated at a workshop held on 8 July 2011. The plan protected Lake Kanzigiri and Lake Rweru, which are connected by a channel that crosses the Ruduhira Marsh. It defined Integral Zones, which are spaces that must remain practically free from human influences. These include lakes Gacamirindi, Nagitamo and Mwungere lakes, and the marshes of the secondary valleys of the Akanyaru River which connects it with all the lakes including the Nyavyamo and Ruduhira marshes.

== Sources ==
- Kagera TAMP - Bugesera aquatic landscapes endowed with a management plan, Kirundo province, Burundi: FAO, 8 July 2011
- Nzigidahera, Benoît; Fofo, Alphonse; Misigaro, Apollinaire (August 2005), Paysage Aquatique Protege du Nord du Burundi – Etude D'identification (PDF) (in French)
- Nzigidahera, Benoît; Nindorera, Damien (September 2009), Plan de gestion et d’aménagement du Paysage Aquatique Protégé de Bugesera (PDF) (in French)
