= Muyange, Bugabira =

Muyange
- village
- Location within Burundi
- Coordinates: 2.4971174°S 30.0455398°E
- Country: Burundi
- Province: Kirundo Province
- Commune: Bugabira Commune
- Time zone: UTC+2 (Central Africa Time)

Muyange is a village in Bugabira Commune, Kirundo Province, Burundi.

== Location ==
Muyange is in the south of Bugabira Commune. It is west of the road that leads from Kirundo town north to Ruhehe. It is east of Lake Gitamo. The Köppen climate classification is: Aw: Tropical savanna, wet.

== Facilities ==
The village has a health center (Centre de Sante). It uses solar panels, with storage and an AC converter, to supply power for lights, medical equipment and refrigeration. In 2013, the quality of service indicators for hygiene, maternity care and financial management were scored at around 75% - 80%. It served a target population of 23,359 as of 2017.

The Primary School (ECOFO) in Muyange had a rainwater harvesting system installed in May 2023. The water is used to clean the classrooms, latrines and school canteen. Funding for this and eleven similar systems in Kirundo Province was given by WFP Burundi and UNICEF Burundi.

== Sources ==
- Carte Sanitaire du Burundi (PDF), Burundi Ministry of Public Health, 2016
- CDS Muyange, Ministere de la Sante Publique et de la Lutte Contre le Sida
- EDF — electrification of 25 health centres in the provinces of Kirundo, Muyinga, Cankuzo, Ruyigi and Rutana in Burundi, Mercell, 2012
- "Muyange, Kirundo Province, Burundi", Mindat
- "Node: Muyange (10202922228)", OpenStreetMap
- Santamaria, Elisa Revert; Kwizera, Odette (26 June 2023), Rainwater harvesting systems at school improve pupil's lives in Kirundo
