= Nunga Marsh =

Marsh in Burundi

- Marais de Nunga
- Location within Burundi
- Location: Kirundo Province of Burundi
- Coordinates: 2.5238°S 29.9666°E
- Type: Wetland

Nunga Marsh (French: Marais de Nunga; 2.5238°S 29.9666°E) is a marsh in the Commune of Ntega, in Kirundo Province, Burundi.

== Location ==
Nunga covers an area of 39 hectares (96 acres). The area around Nunga is almost covered in fields. There are about 356 people per square kilometer around Nunga which is highly populated. The Köppen climate classification is: Aw : Tropical savanna, wet. The average temperature is 20 °C (68 °F). The hottest month is September, at 22 °C (72 °F), and the coldest is April, at 18 °C (64 °F). The average rainfall is 1,170 millimetres (46 in) per year. The wettest month is March, with 178 millimetres (7.0 in), and the driest is July, with 1 millimetre (0.039 in).

== Sources ==
- "Nunga, Kirundo Province, Burundi", Mindat
- "NASA Earth Observations: Population Density". NASA/SEDAC.
- "NASA Earth Observations Data Set Index". NASA.
- "NASA Earth Observations: Rainfall (1 month - TRMM)". NASA/Tropical Rainfall Monitoring Mission.>
- "NASA Earth Observations: Land Cover Classification". NASA/MODIS.
- Strategie Nationale De Developpement De La Filiere Riz Au Burundi (PDF), Ministere de l’Agriculture et de l’Elevage, 2014
