= Commune of Gitobe =

- Commune
- Location within Burundi
- Country: Burundi
- Province: Kirundo Province
- Administrative center: Gitobe
- Time zone: UTC+2 (Central Africa Time)

The Commune of Gitobe is a commune of Kirundo Province in northern Burundi.

== Location ==
The Commune of Gitobe has an area of 180.2 square kilometres (69.6 sq mi) and had a population of 57,326 as of the 2008 census.

== Administrative divisions ==
The capital lies at Gitobe.

Gitobe is divided into 20 collines, from north to south:

- Shore
- Bigombo
- Rungazi
- Santunda
- Gahosha
- Butahana
- Gasuga
- Bucana
- Gihinga
- Butihinda
- Marembo
- Baziro
- Burwana
- Cumba
- Kivumu
- Mirwa
- Ruhongore
- Tonga
- Nyenzi
- Ngoma

== Sources ==
- "BURUNDI: Administrative Division", City Population
- "Burundi / Kirundo / Gitobe", GADM
- United States. Foreign Broadcast Information Service (1982). Sub-Saharan Africa report. Foreign Broadcast Information Service.
