= Commune of Vumbi =

- Commune
- Location within Burundi
- Coordinates: 2°42′34″S 30°06′36″E
- Country: Burundi
- Province: Kirundo Province
- Administrative center: Vumbi
- Time zone: UTC+2 (Central Africa Time)

The Commune of Vumbi is a commune of Kirundo Province in northern Burundi.

== Location ==
The Commune of Vumbi has an area of 205.8 square kilometres (79.5 sq mi) and had a population of 77,656 as of the 2008 census.

== Administrative divisions ==
The capital lies at Vumbi.

Vumbi is divided into 36 collines, from north to south:

- Kabirizi
- Canika
- Kiziba
- Nyamisagara
- Rwamikore
- Kirima
- Muramba
- Gahe
- Nyabihanga
- Gatare
- Martyazo
- Gasura
- Muyebe
- Kigobe
- Cendajuru
- Bwinyana
- Burarana
- Nyamivuma
- Ryangema
- Gashingwa
- Nyamyumba
- Nyagatovu
- Kabuye-Gitanga
- Vumbi
- Mutoyi
- Rugeri
- Rwisuri
- Nyakibanda
- Rwimanzovu
- Nyabikenke
- Kavumu
- Butsimba
- Kiraro
- Mbasi
- Kabuye-Shororo
- Gikomero

About 1500 Rwandan refugees were in Vumbi commune during the genocide.

== Sources ==
- "BURUNDI: Administrative Division", City Population
- "Burundi / Kirundo / Vumbi", GADM
- C.P. Chacko, ed. (2005). African chronicle: a fortnightly record on governance, economy, development, human rights, and environment. Published by C.P. Chacko on behalf of Asian News Chroniclers. p. 1809.
- United States. Foreign Broadcast Information Service (1982). Sub-Saharan Africa report. Foreign Broadcast Information Service.
