= Nyavyamo Marsh =

Marsh in Burundi

- Marécage de la Nyavyamo
- Location within Burundi
- Location: Kirundo Province of Burundi
- Coordinates: 2.54333°S 30.03722°E
- Type: Wetland

Nyavyamo Marsh (French: marécage de la Nyavyamo; 2.54333°S 30.03722°E) is a marsh in the west of Kirundo Province, Burundi. Although parts are protected, it is mainly used for rice production.

== Location ==
The 538 hectares (1,330 acres) Nyavyamo Marsh spans the communes of Kirundo and Ntega. It occupies one of the secondary valleys of the Akanyaru River. Lake Rwihinda, Lake Nagitamo and Lake Narungazi are connected to the Nyavyamo marsh. The area around the marsh is almost covered in fields. There are about 356 people per square kilometer around Nyavyamo, which is highly populated.

The Nyavyamo Marsh is fed by Lake Rwihinda, by the Rugorwe River which flows to the east of the Murungurira colline, by the Mugisomeka River, which flows east into the marsh north of the Rwimbogo colline, and by the Rurata River. The Rurata is fed by the Mwohero, which is fed by the Gacobwoya, the Murugomero and the Rugumba, which forms to the north of the Nyamisagara and Cumba collines.

== Climate ==
The Köppen climate classification of the Nyavyamo Marsh is Aw: Tropical savanna, wet. The average temperature is 20 °C (68 °F). The hottest month is September, at 22 °C (72 °F), and the coldest is April, at 18 °C (64 °F). The average rainfall is 1,170 millimetres (46 in) per year. The wettest month is March, with 178 millimetres (7.0 in) of rain, and the driest is July, with 1 millimetre (0.039 in).

== Protection ==
The Rwihinda Lake Natural Reserve protects Lake Rwihinda, upstream from the Akanyaru wetlands. The lake covers 425 hectares (1,050 acres), but the protected area is 8,000 hectares (20,000 acres) to include the Nyavyamo swamps.

Draining the Nyavyamo swamp downstream from Lake Rwihinda would be fatal, opening an exit route for all the water, like emptying a dam pond. Lake Gacamirindi dried up in 2004, a period of normal precipitation. Lake Narungazi and Lake Nagitamo now supply water to Lake Gacamirindi through a canal connecting the lakes through the Rugege Marsh. There is a risk that this canal will lower the water level of the Nyavyamo Marsh and Lake Rwihinda, particularly during periods of drought, when water no longer flows from the Akanyaru River to Lake Rwihinda.

== Development ==
3,000 tonnes of sorghum were produced in the Commune of Ntega in 2003-2004. The Nyavyamo marsh was used to cultivate sorghum upstream of Lake Narungazi. In August 2017 Melchior Nankwahomba, governor of Kirundo Province, launched the transplanting of rice seedlings in the Nyavyamo Marsh. The rice harvest was estimated to be between 8 and 10 tons per hectare, or between 4,304 and 5,380 tonnes in total. In December 2020 the Ministry of the Environment, Agriculture and Livestock of Burundi posted a request for consulting services on control and monitoring of hydro-agricultural works in the Nyavyamo and Kabuyenge marshes. In July 2023 Stecol Corporation announced that the governor of Kirundo, Albert Hatungimana, had awarded the company a certificate recognizing its contribution to agricultural productivity by building marshland hydro-agricultural projects in the Nyavyamo and Kabuyenge marshes, starting in August 2014. The work included canals, dams, pumping stations and other facilities.

== Sources ==
- A List of Burundi Natural Reserves, Rusizi National Park
- "Burundi : Le marais de Nyavyamo donnera près de 5.380 tonnes de riz", AGnews, 14 August 2017
- Local Development Contribution Award in Burundi, Stecol Corporation, 2023-07-12
- NASA Earth Observations: Population Density, NASA/SEDAC
- NASA Earth Observations Data Set Index, NASA
- NASA Earth Observations: Rainfall (1 month - TRMM), NASA/Tropical Rainfall Monitoring Mission
- NASA Earth Observations: Land Cover Classification, NASA/MODIS
- "Nyavyamo, Kirundo Province, Burundi", Mindat
- Nzigidahera, Benoît; Fofo, Alphonse; Misigaro, Apollinaire (August 2005), Paysage Aquatique Protege du Nord du Burundi – Etude D'identification (PDF) (in French)
- Projet d'Appui à la Transformation de l'Agriculture dans la Région Naturelle de Bugesera (PATAREB): Contrôle et Surveillance des travaux d’aménagements hydro-agricoles des marais de Nyavyamo et Kabuyenge\ (in French), Ministry of the Environment, Agriculture and Livestock
- U.S. Defense Mapping Agency (1994), Kirundo (PDF), University of Texas at Austin
