= Rugero =

- Colline
- Location within Burundi
- Coordinates: 2°36′34.3″S 30°06′30.6″E
- Country: Burundi
- Province: Kirundo Province
- Commune: Commune of Kirundo
- Colline: Rugero
- Time zone: UTC+2 (Central Africa Time)

Rugero is a colline in Kirundo Commune, Kirundo Province, Burundi.

== Location ==
Rugero is about 2 kilometres (1.2 mi) southeast of the center of Kirundo town. It is one of 24 collines in Kirundo Commune. Shinge is southeast of the center of Rugero. The Köppen climate classification is Aw: Tropical savanna, wet.

== History ==
Shinge and Rugero are two distinct but neighboring hills in the Bugesera region of northern Burundi. They were contested during a war of 1763 between Mutaga Senyamwiza, ruler of Burundi, and Yuhi III Mazimpaka, ruler of Rwanda, in which the forces of Burundi prevailed. In 1775 the war resumed, and the Rwandan troops camped on Mount Shinge. The Burundian troops had divided into three units, one between the two hills, one hidden behind Mount Rugero, and one that circled behind the Rwandan position on Mount Shinge. The Rwandans attacked and defeated the first unit, but found themselves caught in the crossfire between the other two, and were defeated.

At the time of the war the area was called Muharuro. It was renamed "Kirundo"" ("piles") to commemorate the piles of dead Rwandans after the battle. The term "Kubura Shinge na Rugero", meaning "to lose Shinge and Rugero" refers to the Rwandan loss, but has come to mean having nobody to rely upon, to have no fire or home. Recently a festival has been held on the site to commemorate the victory.

== Sources ==
- Bizimana, Arthur (6 January 2020), "Ce qu'il faut savoir sur l'expression « Kubura Shinge na Rugero »", Akeza.net
- Nyandwi, Dieudonné (29 August 2019), Festival Igihugu: les festivaliers visitent les mots Shinge et Rugero (in French), Radio Télévision Nationale du Burundi
- "Burundi / Kirundo / Kirundo", GADM
- "Rugero, Kirundo Province, Burundi", Mindat
- "Shinge, Rugero, Burundi", Google Maps
