= Lake Narungazi =

Lake in Burundi

- Lac Narungazi
- Location within Burundi
- Location: Kirundo Province of Burundi
- Coordinates: 2.5365°S 30.0031°E

Lake Narungazi (French: Lac Narungazi), or Lake Narugazi, Lake Narunganzi, is a lake in the Commune of Ntega in Kirundo Province of Burundi.

== Location ==
Lake Narungazi is in the Commune of Ntega, Kirundo Province, to the east of Mugendo. It is west of Lake Rwihinda and south of Lake Nagitamo. It covers an area of 61 hectares (150 acres) in a valley at an altitude of 1,380 metres (4,530 ft) bordered by the collines Nyange–Kiriringanire and Kanyarwe–Mwunguko, which reach an altitude of 1,452 metres (4,764 ft).

== Environment ==
Lake Narungazi is in the Nyavyamo cyperus papyrus swamp which extends east from the Akanyaru River and includes Lake Nagitamo and Lake Rwihinda. Upstream of Lake Narungazi, the Nyavyamo marsh is used for the cultivation of sorghum. The southern branch of Lake Narungazi, between the collines of Kanyago the east and Mugendo to the west, extends through Narungazi marsh, which is used for cultivation of rice up to the edge of the water, apart from some fragments of Typha domingensis and some tufts of Phragmites.

Lake Gacamirindi dried up in 2004, a period of normal precipitation. Lake Narungazi and Lake Nagitamo now supply water to Lake Gacamirindi through a canal connecting the lakes through the Rugege marsh. There is a risk that this canal will lower the water level of Lake Rwihinda, particularly during periods of drought, when water no longer flows from the Akanyaru River to Lake Rwihinda.

== Conservation ==
Lake Narungazi is part of the Protected Aquatic Landscape of the North (French: Paysage Aquatique Protégé du Nord), a 162.42 square kilometres (62.71 sq mi) complex of 8 permanent freshwater lakes including lakes Rweru, Cohoha, Rwihinda, Kanzigiri, Gacamirindi, Nagitamo, Narungazi and Mwungere as well as marshes, that form part of the Nile Basin. These lakes are dominated by small Tilapia and Oreochromis species. They have been the site of largescale invasions of water hyacinth, which has greatly decreased production and reduced fish stocks, as well as crowded out native vegetation. Burundi has taken little effort to remove the invasive species.

In October 2013 it was reported that an entrepreneur had introduced new species of fish to the lake. The local people thought he had added harmful chemicals to the water to protect the fish, and they were no longer allowed to use the water. An official from the Ministry of the Environment said the proper permits had been issued. The entrepreneur denied adding anything other than a ton of tilapia from Lake Rweru to the water. It seemed from the report that there were some restrictions on fishing for the first year.

== Sources ==
- Decret N°100-114 Du 12 Avril 2011 Portant Delimitation du Paysage Aquatique Protege du Nord (PDF) (in French), Republic of Burundi
- Maishatse, Lorraine Josiane (30 October 2013), "Lake Narungazi, a private property?", Iawcu English News
- Nzigidahera, Benoît; Fofo, Alphonse; Misigaro, Apollinaire (August 2005), Paysage Aquatique Protege du Nord du Burundi – Etude D'identification (PDF) (in French)
- USAID/Burundi Foreign Assistance Act Sections 118/119 Tropical Forests and Biodiversity Analysis (PDF), June 2022, archived from the original (PDF) on August 1, 2023
- "Way: Lac Narungazi (125766576)", OpenStreetMap
