= Commune of Busoni =

- Commune
- Location within Burundi
- Coordinates: 2.527°S 30.217°E
- Country: Burundi
- Province: Kirundo Province
- Time zone: UTC+2 (Central Africa Time)

Busoni is a commune of Kirundo Province in northern Burundi. The seat lies at Busoni.

== Location ==
The Commune of Busoni has an area of 420.9 square kilometres (162.5 sq mi) and had a population of 145,424 as of the 2008 census. It is in the north of Kirundo Province, bordering Rwanda to the north. The northeast is covered by the southern part of Lake Rweru, which extends north into Rwanda and east into the Commune of Giteranyi. Lake Kanzigiri defines the northeastern boundary with the Commune of Bwambarangwe. The settlement of Kabanga is to the west of its southern point. Akayoba Island (Île Akayoba) is in the south of the lake. The Murehe Forest is in the north of the commune. The upper part of Lake Cohoha is in the northeast. The RN 14 highway runs north through the eastern part of the commune through Gasenyi to the Rwandan border, where it becomes the NR5 highway.

== Environment ==
The Muhere Forest is to the west of Lake Rweru and east of the RN 14 highway, which crosses into Rwanda to the north of Gasenyi. It is in the Commune of Busoni in the collines of Munazi, Kivo, Yanza, Gatete and Vyanzo. The collines of Muhere have the form of domes separated by small valleys. The highest points are 1,565 metres (5,135 ft) above sea level, and the lowlands are 1,327 to 1,343 metres (4,354 to 4,406 ft) above sea level. The Victoria Basin forest–savanna mosaic centers around Lake Victoria and extends through parts of Uganda, Kenya, Tanzania, Rwanda, and Burundi. The portion of this ecosystem in Burundi in limited to the northeast, and includes the Ruvubu National Park and the Murehe Forest Reserve.

Lake Kanzigiri lies to the south of Lake Rweru, to which it is connected by an area of marshland. The lake covers 750 hectares (1,900 acres). Around Lake Kanzigiri there are wooded savannahs dominated by plants such as Pericopsis angolensis, Parinari curatellifolia and Hymenocardia acida, which indicate Zambezian influences. These eastern savannas are mainly found in the Ruvubu National Park, which indicates that Lake Kanzigiri and its marshes associated with it are a zone of separation between the Bugesera District and the Mosso-Malagarazi District.

== Administrative divisions ==
The capital of the commune is at Busoni. There is a health center at Kabanga.

Busoni is divided into 42 collines, from north to south:

- Gatete
- Lake Rweru
- Sigu
- Rwibikara
- Gatare
- Nyabisindu
- Kivo
- Kumana
- Marembo
- Murambi
- Nyagisozi
- Kigoma
- Higiro
- Munazi
- Gitete
- Muyange
- Nyakizu
- Ruheha
- Gisenyi
- Kibonde
- Muvyuko
- Nyabugeni
- Kididiri
- Burara
- Karambo
- Kabanga
- Rugarama
- Rurira
- Renga
- Rutabo
- Mugobe
- Buringa
- Murore
- Rurende
- Kagege
- Ruyaga
- Munyinya
- Buhimba
- Gatemere
- Mukerwa
- Kiravumba
- Runyinya

== Economy ==
In 2008 the OPEC Fund for International Development announced a project to build a paved road running 37 kilometres (23 mi) from the city of Kirundo to Gasenyi and the border with Rwanda. The project would also includes upgrades to feeder roads and social infrastructure. In 2021 and again in 2022 dozens of collines in the Bugabira, Busoni, Kirundo and Ntega communes of Kirundo experienced a shortage of rain during the period when the bean, corn and sorghum crops were flowering and ripening, affecting over 200,000 people. Many men left the affected areas in search of work, leaving the elderly, disabled, women and children behind.

== Sources ==
- "BURUNDI: Administrative Division", City Population
- "Burundi / Kirundo / Busoni", GADM
- EDF — electrification of 25 health centres in the provinces of Kirundo, Muyinga, Cankuzo, Ruyigi and Rutana in Burundi, Mercell Norge AS
- Fiche descriptive sur les zones humides Ramsar (FDR) (PDF) (in French), 14 March 2013
- Kirundo-Gasenyi Road Project, OPEC Fund for International Development, 2008
- "Node: Foret de Murehe (6852606514)", OpenStreetMap, 4 October 2019
- Nzigidahera, Benoît; Fofo, Alphonse; Misigaro, Apollinaire (August 2005), Paysage Aquatique Protege du Nord du Burundi – Etude D'identification (PDF) (in French)
- "Relation: Busoni (2985685)", OpenStreetMap
- UN Humanitarian (23 February 2022), Burundi: 200,000 people affected by lack of rain need assistance, OCHA
- USAID/Burundi Foreign Assistance Act Sections 118/119 Tropical Forests and Biodiversity Analysis (PDF), June 2022, archived from the original (PDF) on August 1, 2023
