= Ruhehe =

- Town
- Location within Burundi
- Coordinates: 2.5314°S 30.0706°E
- Country: Burundi
- Province: Kirundo Province
- Commune: Bugabira Commune
- Time zone: UTC+2 (Central Africa Time)

Ruhehe is a large village and colline of the Commune of Bugabira, in the Kirundo Province of Burundi.

== Location ==
Ruhehe is roughly in the center of Bugabira Commune in the road leading north from Bugabira in Kirundo Commune to Kiyonza in the north of Bugabira Commune. It is northeast of Lake Gacamirindi.

== Development ==
By 2010 a severe drought in northern Burundi had lasted for three years. On the Ruhehe colline there was a market called the "Cabaret d'eau" that sold water at $2 for 20 litres (4.4 imp gal; 5.3 US gal), five times the normal price. The water was carried to the market on bicycles. Those who could not afford it had to make do with unsanitary lake water, often not boiled because of the high price of firewood.

There is a health center in Ruhehe. Solar panels, with storage and an AC convertor, supply power for lights, medical equipment and refrigeration.

A March 2021 report on the environmental and social impact of a project to develop schools in Ruhehe and other locations noted that a rainwater collection system would be needed at the Ruhehe school because it is unusual to have a public drinking water supply in the region, and even if available the network would not supply water. The site of the school is 2 kilometres (1.2 mi) from the capital of Bugabira commune, and is owned by the commune. It would include six classrooms, an administrative block, two blocks of drainable latrines and rainwater sanitation works.

In April 2021 the Imbonerakure, youth branch of the National Council for the Defense of Democracy – Forces for the Defense of Democracy (CNDD-FDD), came together to repair the road leading from Bugabira to Ruhehe under the Community Development Work (TDC) program.

== Sources ==
- EDF — electrification of 25 health centres in the provinces of Kirundo, Muyinga, Cankuzo, Ruyigi and Rutana in Burundi, Mercell, 2012
- Le réchauffement climatique dessèche le Burundi (in French), InfoSud, 29 August 2010
- Ndayizamba, Prudence (March 2021), Etude D'impact Environnemental Et Social Pour Les Travaux De Construction Des Infrastructures Scolaires Du Lycee Communal Cankuzo (Commune Cankuzo), De L'ecole Primaire Masama (Commune Nyamurenza), Ecole Fondamentale Carubambo, Ecole Technique Nyamurenza (Commune Nyamurenza), Ecofo Ruhehe (Commune Bugabira). (PDF) (in French)
- "Node: Ruhehe (1347150636)", OpenStreetMap
- "TDC – Les IMBONERAKURE ré-aménagent la route vers RUHEHE à BUGARIRA / KIRUNDO", AGnews (in French), 12 April 2021
