= Vumbi =

- Town
- Location in Burundi
- Coordinates: 2°41′55″S 30°6′15″E
- Country: Burundi
- Province: Kirundo Province
- Commune: Commune of Vumbi
- Time zone: UTC+2 (Central Africa Time)

Vumbi is a town and seat of the Commune of Vumbi in Kirundo Province in northern Burundi. By road it is located 15 kilometres (9.3 mi) southeast of Kirundo on RN 14. During the genocide, the Minister of the Interior met at Vumbi in a meeting on August 7, 1996.
