= Rugamura Marsh =

Marsh in Burundi

- Marais de Rugamura
- Location within Burundi
- Location: Kirundo Province of Burundi
- Coordinates: 2.53°S 30.121°E
- Type: Wetland

Rugamura Marsh (French: Marais de Rugamura; 2.53°S 30.121°E) is a marsh in Kirundo Province, Burundi. It is used for cultivation of rice and sorghum.

== Location ==
Rugamura Marsh is in the north of the Kirundo Commune. It joins the main southern branches of Lake Cohoha. It is northeast of Rutare and the Kirundo Airport. The Köppen climate classification is Aw: Tropical savanna, wet.

== Development ==
The Giriteka cooperative has 82 members, of whom 45 are women. The Confederation of Agricultural Producers' Associations for Development (Confédération des Associations des Producteurs Agricoles pour le Développement: CAPAD) had trained the members in composting and sowing beans, corn and rice in rows in Rugamura Marsh.

During 2013-2016 the Burundian government, with funding from the African Development Bank, launched the Bugesera Rural Infrastructure Support Project (PAIRB). This included hydro-agricultural development of 72.5 hectares (179 acres) of the Rugamura Marsh, 232 hectares (570 acres) of the Kabuyenge Marsh and 538.5 hectares (1,331 acres) of the Nyavyamo Marsh. It included building drainage outlets, irrigation networks, dykes, access trails, spillways and other infrastructure.

In August 2021 the governor of Kurundo Province, Albert Hatungimana, visited Rugamura Marsh where he launched dry season rice-growing activities. He has said that irrigation is the only way to make the province once again the breadbasket of Burundi. As of 2023 the marsh produced 1.6 tonnes of rice per hectare. The maximum that could be achieved was 5 to 6 tonnes per hectare. Sorghum was also grown in the marsh.

== Sources ==
- Abel Kagwira (2011), Les Champs des Membres des Coopératives Servent pour l’Apprentissage de la population, Confédération des Associations des Producteurs Agricoles pour le Développement
- Bruce Habarugira (13 August 2021), "Kirundo Province: Hillside irrigation as a solution to recurring drought", BurundiEco
- Chantal Umuhire (6 December 2023), Projet d'apui a la transformation de l'agriculture dans la region naturelle du Bugesera (PDF) (in French), African Development Bank
- L'ingenierie ay service du developpement (PDF), CIRA SAS (Consulting Engineering And Applied Research)
- "Rugamura, Kirundo Province, Burundi", Mindat
- "Way: Rugamura (1262553540)", OpenStreetMap
