= Commune of Ntega =

- Commune
- Location within Burundi
- Coordinates: 2°36′55″S 29°59′56″E
- Country: Burundi
- Province: Kirundo Province
- Administrative center: Ntega
- Time zone: UTC+2 (Central Africa Time)

The commune of Ntega is a commune of Kirundo Province in northern Burundi.

== Location ==
The Commune of Ntega has an area of 260.8 square kilometres (100.7 sq mi) and had a population of 98,665 as of the 2008 census.

== Environment ==
Lake Narungazi is in the Commune of Ntega, west of Lake Rwihinda and south of Lake Nagitamo. It covers an area of 61 hectares (150 acres) in a valley at an altitude of 1,380 metres (4,530 ft) bordered by the collines Nyange–Kiriringanire and Kanyarwe–Mwunguko, which reach an altitude of 1,452 metres (4,764 ft). It is in the Nyavyamo cyperus papyrus swamp which extends east from the Akanyaru River and includes Lake Nagitamo and Lake Rwihinda. Upstream of Lake Narungazi, the Nyavyamo marsh is used for the cultivation of sorghum. The southern branch of Lake Narungazi, between the collines of Kanyago the east and Mugendo to the west, extends through Narungazi marsh, which is used for cultivation of rice up to the edge of the water, apart from some fragments of Typha domingensis and some tufts of Phragmites.

Lake Mwungere is in the Commune of Ntega near the villages of Mariza and Mugina. It is connected by wetlands to the Akanyaru River.

== Administrative divisions ==
The capital lies at Ntega. The commune is divided into the following collines, from north to south,

- Mugendo
- Kinyovu
- Makombe
- Kanyagu
- Buringanire
- Carubambo
- Murungurira
- Susa
- Mariza
- Sasa
- Nyemera
- Rugese
- Monge
- Gitwenzi
- Gasave
- Kigaga
- Rwimbogo
- Ntega
- Mihigo
- Gatwe
- Gihome
- Kanabugire
- Nyakibingo
- Gisitwe
- Nkorwe
- Rushubije
- Mwendo
- Muyinza
- Rukore
- Murarambwe
- Runyankezi
- Bugorora
- Gatanga

== Economy ==
In 2021 and again in 2022 dozens of collines in the Bugabira, Busoni, Kirundo and Ntega communes of Kirundo experienced a shortage of rain during the period when the bean, corn and sorghum crops were flowering and ripening, affecting over 200,000 people. Many men left the affected areas in search of work, leaving the elderly, disabled, women and children behind.

== Sources ==
- "BURUNDI: Administrative Division", City Population
- Burundi / Kirundo / Ntega, GADM
- Decret N°100-114 Du 12 Avril 2011 Portant Delimitation du Paysage Aquatique Protege du Nord (PDF) (in French), Republic of Burundi
- Nzigidahera, Benoît; Fofo, Alphonse; Misigaro, Apollinaire (August 2005), Paysage Aquatique Protege du Nord du Burundi – Etude D'identification (PDF) (in French)
- United States. Foreign Broadcast Information Service (1982). Sub-Saharan Africa report. Foreign Broadcast Information Service.
- UN Humanitarian (23 February 2022), Burundi: 200,000 people affected by lack of rain need assistance, OCHA
- "Way: Lac Mwungere (299661662)", OpenStreetMap
- "Way: Lac Narungazi (125766576)", OpenStreetMap
