= Commune of Matongo =

Coordinates: 3°05′22″S 29°36′43″E

- Commune
- Interactive map of Commune of Matongo
- Country: Burundi
- Province: Kayanza Province
- Administrative center: Bandaga
- Time zone: UTC+2 (Central Africa Time)

The commune of Matongo is a commune of Butanyerera province in northern Burundi. The capital lies at Bandaga.

It has population of 70,275 people, mostly living in rural areas and living off of agriculture.
