= Commune of Kayanza =

- Commune
- Location within Burundi
- Coordinates: 2°55′20″S 29°37′20″E
- Country: Burundi
- Province: Kayanza Province
- Administrative center: Kayanza

Government
  - Commune Administrator: Godefroid Niyonizigiye
  - Executive Secretary: Justine Komezadusabe

Area
  - Total: 498.6 km^{2} (192.5 sq mi)
- Elevation: 1,957 m (6,421 ft)

Population (2008 census)
  - Total: 97,252
  - Density: 195.1/km^{2} (505.2/sq mi)
- Time zone: UTC+2 (Central Africa Time)
- Website: https://kayanza.gov.bi/

The commune of Kayanza is a commune of Kayanza Province in northern Burundi. The capital lies at Kayanza.
