= Labeobarbus acuticeps =

Conservation status
- Near Threatened (IUCN 3.1)

Scientific classification
- Kingdom: Animalia
- Phylum: Chordata
- Class: Actinopterygii
- Order: Cypriniformes
- Family: Cyprinidae
- Subfamily: Torinae
- Genus: Labeobarbus
- Species: L. acuticeps

Binomial name
- Labeobarbus acuticeps Matthes, 1959

Synonyms
- Barbus acuticeps

Species of fish

Labeobarbus acuticeps is a species of ray-finned fish in the family Cyprinidae. It is found in Burundi, Rwanda, and Tanzania.

Its natural habitats are rivers, freshwater lakes, freshwater marshes, and inland deltas. It is threatened by habitat loss.
