= Synodontis ruandae =

Conservation status
- Vulnerable (IUCN 3.1)

Scientific classification
- Kingdom: Animalia
- Phylum: Chordata
- Class: Actinopterygii
- Order: Siluriformes
- Family: Mochokidae
- Genus: Synodontis
- Species: S. ruandae

Binomial name
- Synodontis ruandae Matthes, 1959

Species of fish

Synodontis ruandae is a species of upside-down catfish native to Rwanda, Burundi, and Tanzania where it is found in the Kagera River system. It was first described by Belgian ichthyologist Hubert Matthes in 1959, based upon holotypes discovered in the Kagera River at Rusumo, Rwanda. The specific name "ruandae" is derived from its type locality, Rwanda.

== Description ==
Like other members of the genus, this fish has a humeral process, which is a bony spike that is attached to a hardened head cap on the fish and can be seen extending beyond the gill opening. The first ray of the dorsal fin and the pectoral fins have a hardened first ray which is serrated. The caudal fin is deeply forked. It has short, cone-shaped teeth in the upper jaw. In the lower jaw, the teeth are s-shaped and movable. The fish has one pair of long maxillary barbels, extending far beyond the operculum, and two pairs of mandibular barbels that are often branched.

This species grows to a length of 12.8 centimetres (5.0 in) SL although specimens up to 16.2 centimetres (6.4 in) TL have been recorded in the wild.

== Habitat ==
In the wild, the species inhabits tropical freshwaters. It is found in shallow waters and vegetation along the edge of the water in the middle and upper Kagera River system. It feeds primarily on insect larvae, and also consumes molluscs. Due to a decline in vegetation around the edges of lakes and rivers as a result of agricultural expansion, the species is listed as vulnerable.
