= Kirundo Province =

Former province of Burundi

Kirundo
- Province
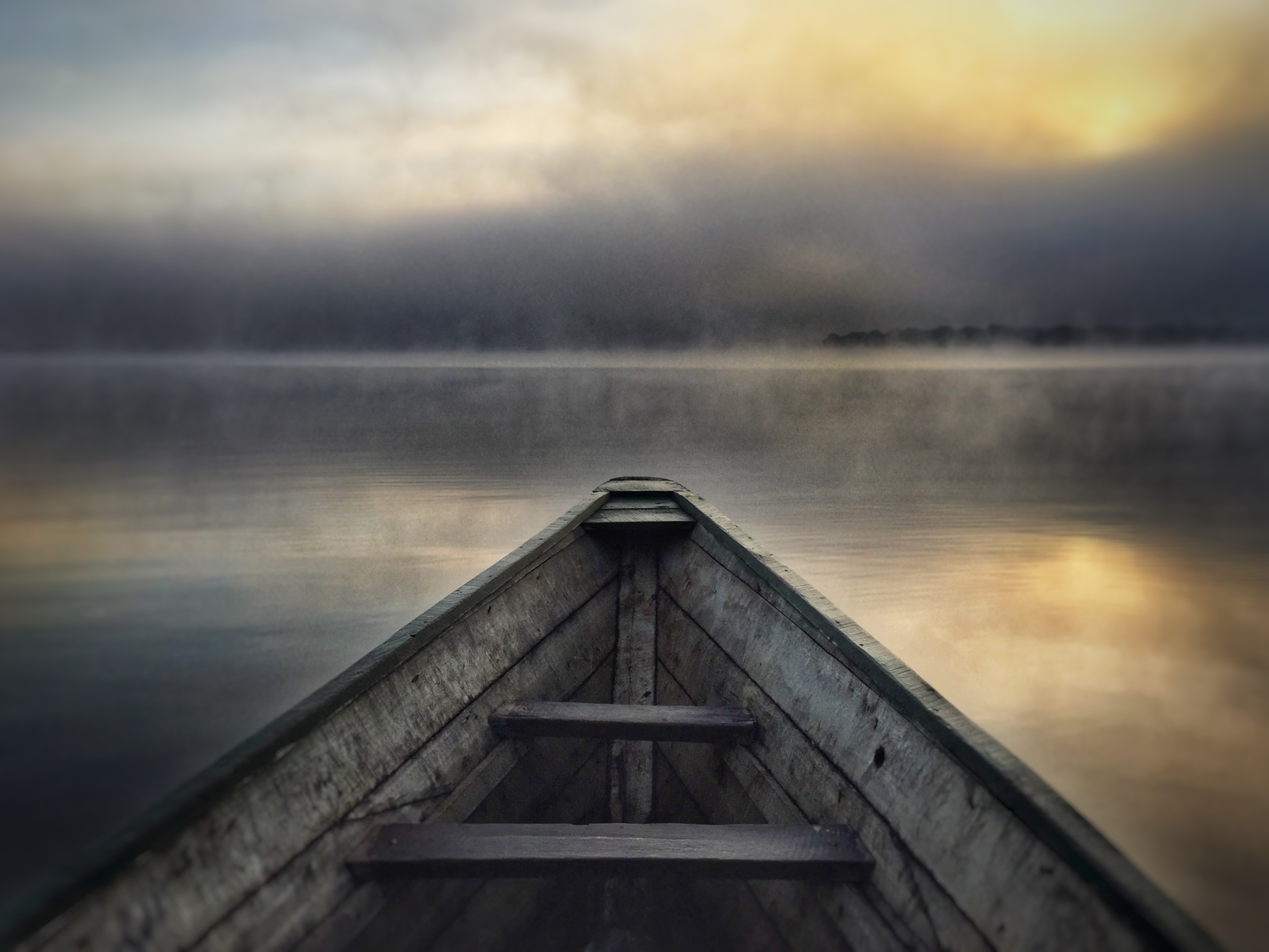
- A boat ride in the morning on Lake Rwihinda near the town of Kirundo

- Location within Burundi
- Country: Burundi
- Capital: Kirundo

Government
  - Governor: Oscar Ruvuna

Area
  - Total: 1,703.34 km^{2} (657.66 sq mi)
  - Rank: Ranked 8th

Population (2008 census)
  - Total: 628,256
  - Density: 368.838/km^{2} (955.285/sq mi)

Kirundo was one of the eighteen provinces of Burundi, in north of the country bordering Rwanda. In 2025, it was merged into the new province of Butanyerera.

The economy was mostly based on agriculture, with a dispersed population and few sizable communities. Before 1970 large parts of the province were forested. Migrants from the south then cleared much of the vegetation to create agricultural land, and Kirundo became the breadbasket of Burundi. The civil war from 1993 to 2005 caused agricultural output to drop by more than half. Afterwards, lack of farm inputs, poor infrastructure and shortages of water caused widespread poverty.

== Geography ==
Kirundo Province was in the north of Burundi, bounded to the north and west by Rwanda. It was bounded to the southwest by Ngozi Province, and to the south and east by Muyinga Province. It had an area of 1,703.34 square kilometres (657.66 sq mi), or 6.1% of the area of Burundi, making it the 8th largest province at the time.

=== Bugesera natural region ===
88% of the province was in the Bugesera natural region. This is a vast batholithic depression carved out of granite rocks. The central plateau has an altitude of 1,500 to 2,000 metres (4,900 to 6,600 ft), and the north is lower, with an average altitude of 1,300 metres (4,300 ft). The Bugesera region is part of the Kirundo district, a depression in the inter-lacustrine zone of East Africa that extends across northeastern Burundi and southeastern Rwanda. It is bounded to the west by the Kanyaru River valley. To the north, east and south it was bounded by dissected plateaus that rise above it. The depression contains large valleys holding Holocene sediments, swamps and shallow lakes.

=== Bweru natural region ===
12% of the province was in the Bweru natural region, including the Commune of Vumbi and the south of the Commune of Gitobe. The Bweru natural region in the south of the province is mountainous. The region is known for its agricultural fertility.

=== Lakes ===
Kirundo Province had eight lakes: Rweru, Cohoha, Rwihinda, Kanzigiri, Gacamirindi, Nagitamo, Narungazi and Mwungere. The lakes are marshy, with an average depth of 2.5 to 5 metres (8 ft 2 in to 16 ft 5 in). All eight lakes are important bird habitats, with 60 species identified in Lake Rwihinda alone. They provide a variety of fish to the surrounding populations. The wetlands leading out of and into many of the lakes are irrigated for rice and sugar cane fields, and the surrounding hillsides are developed for diverse agricultural production. Wetlands include Rugamura Marsh, Kabuyenge Marsh and Nyavyamo Marsh. Nyamabuno Marsh (marais de Nyamabuno).

=== Conservation ===
The Lacs du Nord Aquatic Landscape Protected Area was created in 2006, in theory conserving over 30,000 hectares (74,000 acres), or 14.2 of Burundi's interior waters, up from 0.2%. The stated goals are integrated community management, agricultural production, and lake conservation. The protected aquatic landscape integrates the integrated Natural Reserve of Murehe; the managed Reserves of Lake Rwihinda, Lake Rweru and Lake Cohoha; and the integrated protected zones of Lakes Gacamirinda, Mwungere, Nagitamo, and Kanzigiri. In October 2023 the Inades-Formation Burundi held a workshop on water resource management with local leaders in the capital of Kirundo Province to celebrate World Food Day. It was noted that although the 2012 water code encouraged good practices and penalized violations, some of the lakes still suffered from pollution and unsustainable illegal fishing.

Protected units are:

Unit	Location	Area	
Unit	Location	ha	acre
Lake Rweru	2°23′30″S 30°20′00″E	7,140	17,600
Lake Kanzigiri	2°27′00″S 30°21′36″E	750	1,900
Lake Cohoha	2°26′24″S 30°06′36″E	4,500	11,000
Lake Gacamirindi	2°27′00″S 30°00′00″E	250	620
Lake Rwihinda	2°32′22″S 30°03′15″E	425	1,050
Lake Gitamo	2°31′10″S 30°03′15″E	21	52
Lake Narungazi	2°33′10″S 30°03′25″E	61	150
Lake Mwungere	2°36′15″S 30°03′10″E	20	49
Murehe Forest	2°23′24″S 30°15′00″E	3,075	7,600
Total		16,242	40,130

== Climate ==
The province experienced the same wet and dry seasons as the rest of Burundi. The southeasterly monsoon brings rain in February–May, and the northeasterly monsoon brings rain in September–November. Natural vegetation includes shrubs, savanna and marshland, important for its value in groundwater storage. Expansion of farmland continues to damage this vegetation and the forest plantations. The Bugesera natural region has temperatures that vary from 14.8 to 27.1 °C (58.6 to 80.8 °F), with average annual rainfall of 800 to 1,200 millimetres (31 to 47 in). The Bweru natural region has a slightly different climate from Bugesera natural region, with rainfall over 1,200 millimetres (47 in) annually, and a shorter dry season lasting 5 to 6 months.

== Name ==
Kirundo Province was formerly called Muharuro. During battles between the Rwandans and Barundi in Muharuro in 1763 at Mount Shinge and Mount Rugero, near the provincial capital, the Rwandans were decisively defeated through tactics of the troops of King Mutaga Senyamwiza. The province took its current name of Kirundo (pile) from the piles of corpses of Rwandans killed there in the battle.

== Administration ==
=== Communes ===
Kirundo Province was divided administratively into the communes of Bugabira, Busoni, Bwambarangwe, Gitobe, Kirundo, Ntega and Vumbi. These in turn were divided into 193 collines. Each commune was headed by an administrator. The population was scattered, and the small city of Kirundo is the only urban settlement. Kirundo Province had one of the higher rates of population growth in Burundi. In 2008, when the last census was taken, the commune populations and areas were:

Name	Type	2008 Population	Area		Coords
Name	Type	2008 Population	km2	mile2	Coords
Bugabira	Commune	89,259	235	91	2.436°S 30.0351°E
Busoni	Commune	145,424	421	163	2.527°S 30.217°E
Bwambarangwe	Commune	66,816	193	75	2°33′09″S 30°20′27″E
Gitobe	Commune	57,326	180	69	2°39′39″S 30°14′42″E
Kirundo	Commune	93,110	207	80	2°35′5″S 30°5′50″E
Ntega	Commune	98,665	261	101	2°36′55″S 29°59′56″E
Vumbi-Bukuba	Commune	77,656	206	80	2°42′34″S 30°06′36″E
Kirundo	Province	628,256	1,703	658	2°33′7″S 30°5′39″E

=== Health districts ===
The province was divided into four health districts (French: Districts Sanitaires):

Health district	Communes
Kirundo	Kirundo and Bugabira
Vumbi	Ntega and Vumbi-Bukuba
Busoni	Busoni
Mukenke	Gitobe and Bwambarangwe

There were hospitals in the Kirundo and Mukenke health districts, and health centers (French: Centres de Santé), CDSs, distributed throughout the health districts. Most health centers are public (French: Centres de Santé Public), but some are run by religious organizations (French: Centres de Santé Confessional).

=== Governors ===
The governor of the province must be Burundian and must live in Kirundo or come from Kirundo. The governor is appointed by the President of Burundi after confirmation by the Senate. A partial list of governors of the province:

Governor	Term start	Term end	Notes
Déo Bizimana		1993 November	Assassinated.
Philippe Njoni	1993	2005	Later Minister of Transport, Post and Telecommunications
François Singayimiheto	2005	2010	
Réverien Nzigamasabo	2010	2015	
Melchior Nankwahomba	2015		
Alain Tribert Mutabazi	2019		
Albert Hatungimana	2020 August		
Victor Segasago	2023 November		Colonel de Police.

=== Senators ===
Election year	Senators		
Election year	Hutu	Tutsi	Twa
2005	Pascal Musoro	Philippe Rivuzumwami	Charles Masabo
2010	Emmanuel Ndemeye	Jennifer Kankindi	Vital Bambanze
2015	Jean-Marie Muhirwa	Jennifer Kankindi	
2016	vacant	Jennifer Kankindi	
2020	Dévote Faida	Jean Bosco Ntunzwenimana	

== Economy ==
Until 1970 some of the communes of Kirundo province had few people and were covered in forest. Then migrants from Ngozi and Kayanza came to the province and cleared the forests to create arable land. Farmers in Kirundo province produced goods for sale in the markets. Kirundo was the "breadbasket of Burundi" and supplied agricultural products such as cereals and legumes to the rest of the country before the Burundian Civil War of 1993–2005.

The Burundi Tobacco Company (BTC) was founded in 1979 by Tribert Rujugiro Ayabatwa. In 1982 it made an agreement with farmers in Cibitoke Province and Kirundo Province to supply seed, fertilizer, pesticides, crop extension services, drying and processing, and to buy their tobacco at a price agreed upon in advance. The result was rapid growth in the number of tobacco farmers and the quantity produced. In the 1980s, BTC started to clear large areas of forest to supply wood to the ovens used to dry tobacco, but did not undertake reforestation.

Between 1996 and 2009, agricultural output dropped by 53.9%. Poverty has increased and there are high levels of malnutrition. The farmers have turned to farming for consumption by the family. Reasons for this change include inadequate labor, agricultural equipment and agricultural inputs, poor protection of the soil, persistent conflicts over land ownership and lack of microcredit. The poor roads also contribute to the high levels of poverty in the province. In 2008 the OPEC Fund for International Development announced a project to build a paved road running 37 kilometres (23 mi) from the city of Kirundo to Gasenyi and the border with Rwanda. The project would also includes upgrades to feeder roads and social infrastructure.

In November 2021 Cyriaque Nshimirimana, Second Deputy-Speaker of the Senate of Burundi, met leaders of the province in the capital of the Commune of Ntega. His audience included heads of provincial and municipal services, colline chiefs, leaders of the Sangwe cooperatives and religious leaders. He urged them to preserve peace and security, fight drunkenness, polygamy, unwanted pregnancies and corruption, limit births, send their children to school, continue to build the offices of colline chiefs and join cooperatives to accomplish development projects together. He advised the leaders of cooperatives to be fiscally prudent and transparent. Concerns raised by the audience included the need to repair the Rurata–Ntega road, the lack of teachers and teaching materials in the vocational schools, and the lack of a regional branch of the Banque d’Investissement pour les Jeunes (Investment Bank for Youth).

== Sources ==
- Bigirimana, Raphaël (5 September 2017), L'ancien ministre Philippe Njoni n'est plus, Radio Télévision Nationale du Burundi
- Brinkhoff, Thomas, "BURUNDI: Administrative Division", City Population
- "Burundi 2018 Constitution", Constitute
- "BURUNDI: Administrative Division", City Population
- Burundi Environmental Threats and Opportunities Assessment (ETOA) (PDF), United States Agency for International Development (USAID), September 2010, archived from the original (PDF) on February 22, 2017
- Carte Sanitaire du Burundi (PDF), Burundi Ministry of Public Health, 2016
- Fiche descriptive sur les zones humides Ramsar (FDR) (PDF) (in French), 14 March 2013
- Havyarimana, Richard (7 November 2023), World Food Day in Burundi: Involving all stakeholders for the survival of the northern lakes, Inades-Formation Burundi
- Irambona, Yvette (2022-04-12), "Les régions naturelles du Burundi : Leur signification se fonde sur plusieurs critères", Le Renouveau du Burundi
- Kirundo-Gasenyi Road Project, OPEC Fund for International Development, 2008
- La population de la province Kirundo interpellée à préserver la paix et la sécurité (in French), Senate of Burundi, 29 November 2021
- Mfonobong Nsehe (4 August 2021), Tribert Rujugiro Ayabatwa’s Business and Philanthropic Legacy Will Outlive His Detractors
- Minani, Bonaventure; Rurema, Déo-Guide; Lebailly, Philippe (2013b), "Rural resilience and the role of social capital among farmers in Kirundo province, Northern Burundi", APSTRACT: Applied Studies in Agribusiness and Commerce, AGRIMBA, 7 (2–3): 1–5, doi:10.22004/ag.econ.164817
- Minani, Bonaventure; Rurema, Déo-Guide; Lebailly, Philippe (2013), Analyse et stratégies de l’agriculture familiale dans un pays post-conflit : cas de la province de Kirundo au nord du Burundi (PDF) (in French)
- Nyandwi, Dieudonné (29 August 2019), Festival Igihugu: les festivaliers visitent les mots Shinge et Rugero (in French), Radio Télévision Nationale du Burundi
- Perpétue Nshimirimana (1 November 2013), Assassinat du Président élu Melchior Ndadaye (PDF)
- Présentation officielle du gouverneur de Kirundo par le Président Ndayishimiye, Maison Ntare Rushatsi, 7 November 2023
- "Récoltes : Kirundo aux anges, mais …", IWACU (in French), 5 May 2013
- Report No. 9686-BU Burundi. Private Sector Development in Agriculture, World Bank Agriculture Operations Division South-Central and Indian Ocean Department Africa Region, 22 January 1993
- Sibomana, Alexis; Gangadhara Bhat, H.; Ngenzi, J.C. (December 2017), "Groundwater Prospects in Kirundo District, Northern Burundi: Modeling By Remote Sensing And GIS", International Journal of Information Research and Review (Conference Paper)
- Supervision and Monitoring of hydro-agricultural development works in Rugamura, Kabuyenge and Nyavyamo marshes, Block A., CIRA SAS
