= Lake Gacamirindi =

Lake in Burundi

- French: Lac Gacamirindi
- Location within Burundi
- Location: Kirundo Province of Burundi
- Coordinates: 2°27′00″S 30°00′00″E

Lake Gacamirindi (French: Lac Gacamirindi, 2°27′00″S 30°00′00″E), or Lake Gacamirinda, is a lake in the Kirundo Province of Burundi.

== Location ==
Lake Gacamirindi is in the Commune of Bugabira, Kirundo Province. The lake covers an area of 250 hectares (620 acres), and is set between hills with fairly steep slopes. It is surrounded by the densely populated collines of Kiri and Nyakarama. In the past the lake merged into a marshy area beside the Akanyaru River. Now banana and sorghum are cultivated both upstream and downstream of the lake. Lake Gacamirindi would normally be fed by the waters of the Akanyaru river, but as of 2011 was separated from this river by farmland and had become a small pond of a few hectares. Typha domingensis forms a very narrow belt around this pond, separating the crops and the water.

Lake Gacamirindi dried up in 2004, a period of normal precipitation. Lake Narungazi and Lake Nagitamo now supply water to Lake Gacamirindi through a canal connecting the lakes through the Rugege marsh. There is a risk that this canal will lower the water level of the Nyavyamo Marsh and Lake Rwihinda, particularly during periods of drought, when water no longer flows from the Akanyaru River to Lake Rwihinda.

== Protection ==
In 2001 there was an attempt to create a buffer zone between the lake and the cultivated land, but it was not respected. Lake Gacamirindi is now in the western part of the Paysage aquatique protégé du Nord (Protected Aquatic Landscape of the North), created in 2011. It is protected as an "Integral Zone", where human presence will be phased out. A buffer zone, or belt of land at least 50 metres (160 ft) wide, will be established around the lake.

== Sources ==
- Décret n°100-114 du 12 avril 2011 portant délimitation du paysage aquatique protégé du nord., Food and Agriculture Organization, 12 April 2011
- Fiche descriptive sur les zones humides Ramsar (FDR) (PDF) (in French), 14 March 2013
- Kagera TAMP - Bugesera aquatic landscapes endowed with a management plan, Kirundo province, Burundi: FAO, 8 July 2011
- Nzigidahera, Benoît; Fofo, Alphonse; Misigaro, Apollinaire (August 2005), Paysage Aquatique Protege du Nord du Burundi – Etude D'identification (PDF) (in French)
- "Way: Lac Gacamirinda (25469567)", OpenStreetMap
