= Lake Kanzigiri =

Lake in Burundi

- Lac Kanzigiri
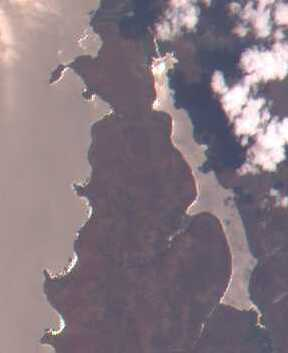

- Location within Burundi
- Location: Kirundo Province of Burundi
- Coordinates: 2.4659°S 30.3611°E

Lake Kanzigiri (French: Lac Kanzigiri, 2.4659°S 30.3611°E) is a lake in the Kirundo Province of Burundi.

== Location ==
Lake Kanzigiri is on the boundary between the Commune of Bwambarangwe to the east and the Commune of Busoni to the west. It lies to the south of Lake Rweru, to which it is connected by an area of marshland. The settlement of Kabanga is to the west of its southern point, and the settlement of Bunwera is to the east of the same point. Mukenke is to the south. The lake covers 750 hectares (1,900 acres).

Around Lake Kanzigiri there are wooded savannahs dominated by plants such as Pericopsis angolensis, Parinari curatellifolia and Hymenocardia acida, which indicate Zambezian influences. These eastern savannas are mainly found in the Ruvubu National Park, which indicates that Lake Kanzigiri and its marshes associated with it are a zone of separation between the Bugesera District and the Mosso-Malagarazi District.

== Tributaries and outlet ==
The south end of the lake is a marsh that is fed by the Kanzigiri River and the Gacucu River, the lower part of the Kabuyenge River. The north end is also a marsh, and is fed by the Kanzigiri Lake and the Nyamabuno River, and empties into Lake Rweru.

However, the direction of flow between Lake Rweru and Lake Kanzigiri depends on the time of year. At the start of the rainy season, Lake Rweru flows towards the Kagera River. By March–April, the Kagera river level is higher than that of Lake Rweru, and the flow is reversed, with the river flowing into Lake Rweru and the marshes that surround it, including that leading to Lake Kanzigiri. When the flood recedes, between June and August, Lake Rweru flows towards the Nyabarongo River over the swamp, and later through a single channel.

== Ecosystem ==
The Kabuyenge Marsh and the Kabanga Marsh maintain the hydrological balance of Lake Kanzigiri. The United Nations Food and Agriculture Organization (FAO) had developed buffer zones around each of these marshes. If the papyrus swamp between Lake Kanzigiri and Lake Rweru were drained, Lake Kanzigiri would dry up during the low flow period. The swamp ecosystem is threatened by uncontrolled extension of farming into the swamps, and also by the recent droughts. Excessive fishing and the introduction of invasive plants also threaten the lake's ecosystem.

== Protection ==
The lake was part of the Lacs du Nord Aquatic Landscape Protected Area that was created in 2006. It was protected as a “Managed Natural Reserve” under the management plan for the Bugesera aquatic landscapes defined in 2011. It is now part of the Northern Protected Waterway.

== Sources ==
- Burundi Environmental Threats and Opportunities Assessment (ETOA) (PDF), United States Agency for International Development (USAID), September 2010, archived from the original (PDF) on February 22, 2017
- Fiche descriptive sur les zones humides Ramsar (FDR) (PDF) (in French), 14 March 2013
- Kagera TAMP - Bugesera aquatic landscapes endowed with a management plan, Kirundo province, Burundi: FAO, 8 July 2011
- Nzigidahera, Benoît; Fofo, Alphonse; Misigaro, Apollinaire (August 2005), Paysage Aquatique Protege du Nord du Burundi – Etude D'identification (PDF) (in French)
- Plan régional de mise en œuvre de la Stratégie Nationale et Plan d’Action sur la Biodiversité dans la dépression de Bugesera 2013-2020 (PDF) (in French), Bujumbura: Institut National pour l’Environnement et la Conservation de la Nature (INECN), November 2013
- USAID/Burundi Foreign Assistance Act Sections 118/119 Tropical Forests and Biodiversity Analysis (PDF), June 2022, archived from the original (PDF) on August 1, 2023
- U.S. Defense Mapping Agency (1994), Lac Rweru, University of Texas at Austin
- U.S. Defense Mapping Agency (1994), Rugari (PDF), University of Texas at Austin
- "Relation: Lac Kanzigiri (2031514)", Open Street Map
