= Lake Gitamo =

Lake in Burundi

- French: Lac Gitamo
- Location within Burundi
- Location: Kirundo Province of Burundi
- Coordinates: 2°31′10″S 30°03′15″E

Lake Gitamo (French: Lac Gitamo, 2°31′10″S 30°03′15″E), or Lake Nagitamo is a lake in the Kirundo Province of Burundi.

== Location ==
Lake Gitamo is in the Commune of Bugabira. It empties into a marshy corridor that leads from Lake Rwihinda and Lake Narungazi to the Akanyaru River. It is south of Lake Gacamirindi, which also drains to the Akanyaru River. Ruhehe is to the north-northwest. Lake Gitamo covers 21 hectares (52 acres).

== Protection ==
Lake Gitama is protected as an "Integral Zone", where human presence will be phased out. Buffer zones, or belts of land at least 50 metres (160 ft) wide, will be established around the zone.

== Sources ==
- Fiche descriptive sur les zones humides Ramsar (FDR) (PDF) (in French), 14 March 2013
- Kagera TAMP - Bugesera aquatic landscapes endowed with a management plan, Kirundo province, Burundi: FAO, 8 July 2011
- "Way: Lac Gitamo (125766573)", OpenStreetMap
