= Lake Rwihinda =

Lake in Burundi

- French: Lac Rwihinda
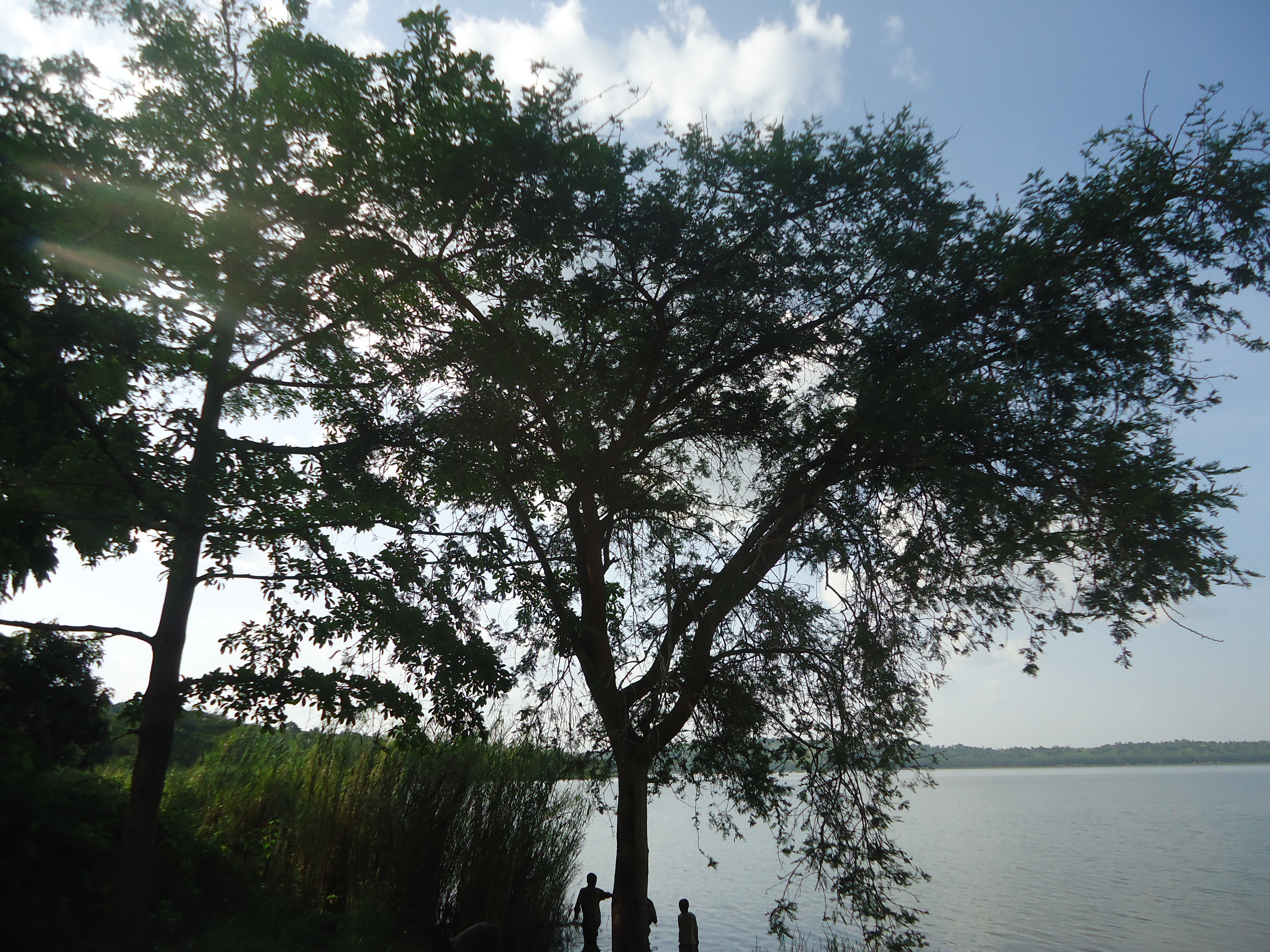
- Lake Rwihinda

- Location within Burundi
- Location: Kirundo Province of Burundi
- Coordinates: 2°32′22″S 30°03′15″E

Lake Rwihinda (French: Lac Rwihinda, 2°32′22″S 30°03′15″E), also known as the Lac aux Oiseaux (Bird Lake) is a lake in the Kirundo Province of Burundi. It is home to diverse migratory birds, which are the main tourist attraction in the region. However, despite being protected, it is under threat from encroaching agriculture in this very poor region.

== Location ==
Lake Rwihinda is in the Commune of Kirundo, to the north of the provincial capital of Kirundo. It covers 425 hectares (1,050 acres) and is 1,420 metres (4,660 ft) above sea level. Mutawenzi and the Mutawenzi Military Camp are just south of the lake. The Kirundo Airport and the settlement of Rutare are to the northeast. A marshy strip leads northwest to the Akanyaru River. Lake Narungazi and Lake Gitamo also drain into this marshy strip. If the cyperus papyrus swamp in the Nyavyamo valley downstream of the lake were drained, the lake would empty out into the Akanyaru River.

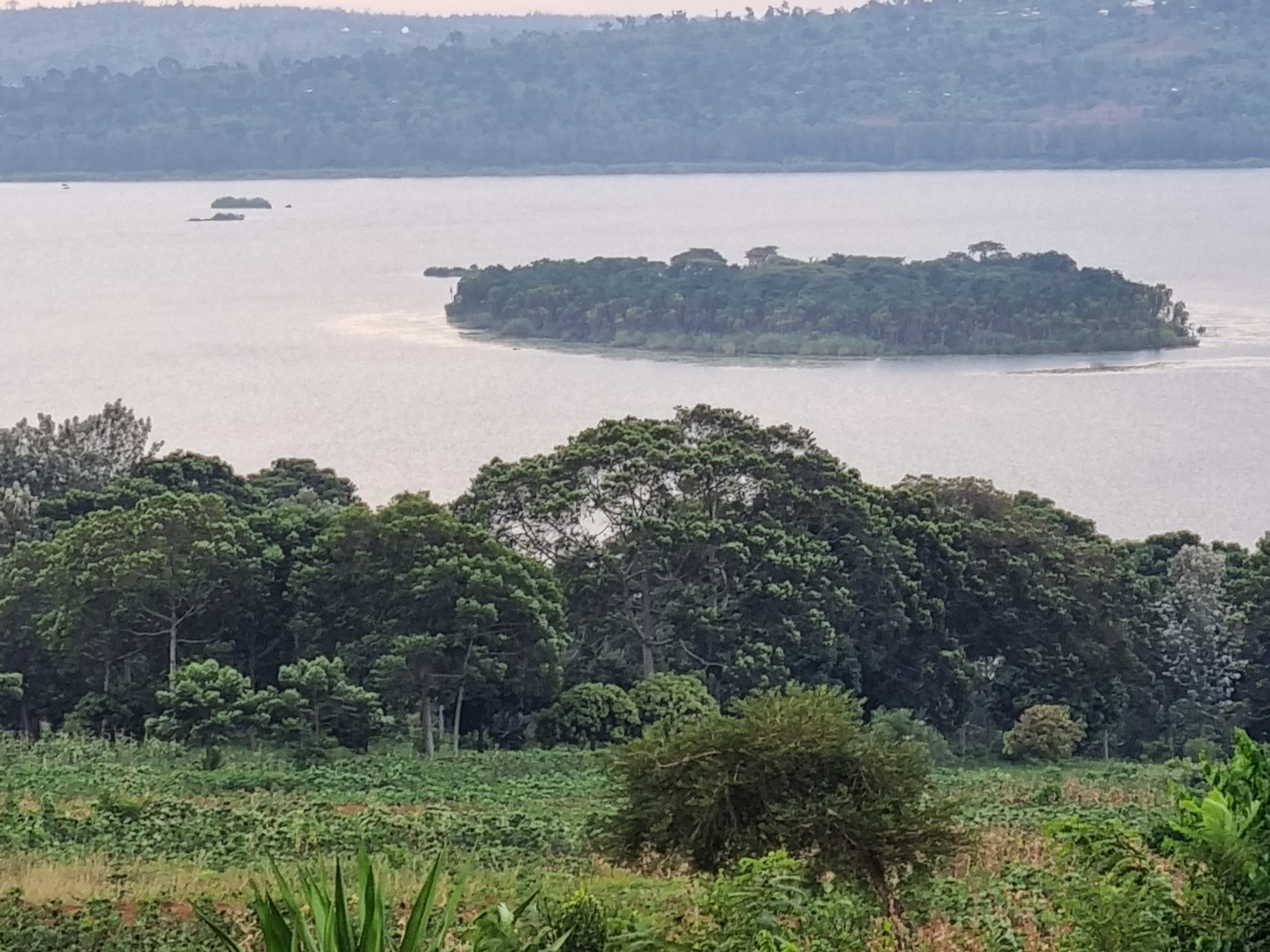
Lake Rwihinda viewed from afar

== Ecology ==
Lake Rwihinda is important for its aquatic biodiversity, and also for the local economy. The birds of Lake Rwihinda are the main tourist attraction of the paysage aquatique du nord, with 200 to 300 tourists visiting each year for birdwatching. The lake attracts diverse species of migratory birds. This may be threatened by the effects of climate change and encroaching cultivation. More than 60 bird species visit the lake, including remarkable species such as Reed cormorant Phalacrocorax africanus, Gambian Spur-winged goose Plectropterus gambensis, Great white pelican Pelecanus onocrotalus and Little egret Egretta garzetta.

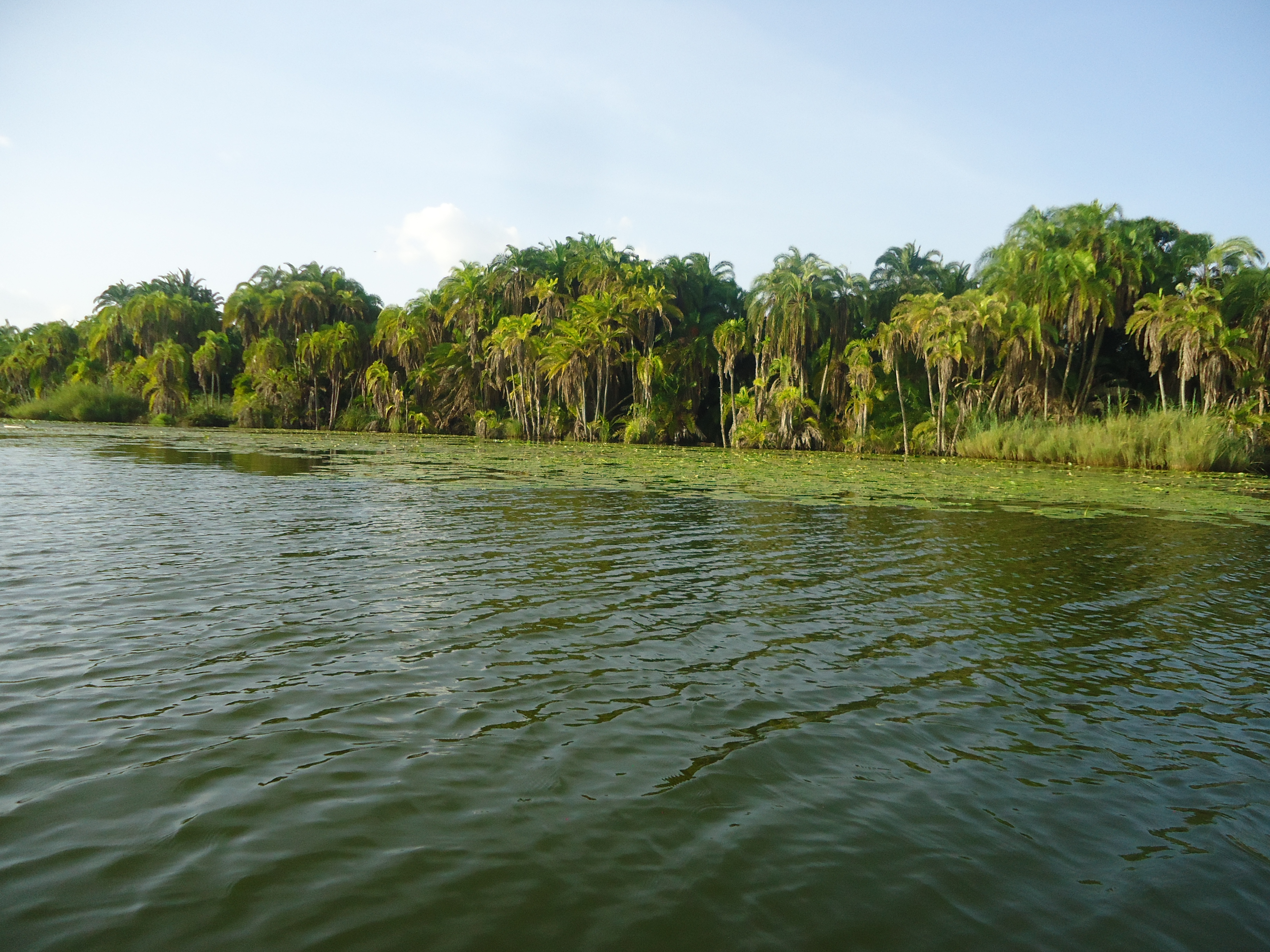
Vue of the island in Lake Rwihinda

The site also supports many animal species in all their life cycles from reproduction to growth. The last hippopotamus in the lake was killed in 1989. Not long ago, Vervet monkeys (Cercopithecus aethiops) were abundant in the riparian areas of Lake Rwihinda. The egg-eating snake Dasypeltis scabra has been found on Akagwa Island in Lake Rwihinda, where it devastates bird nests.

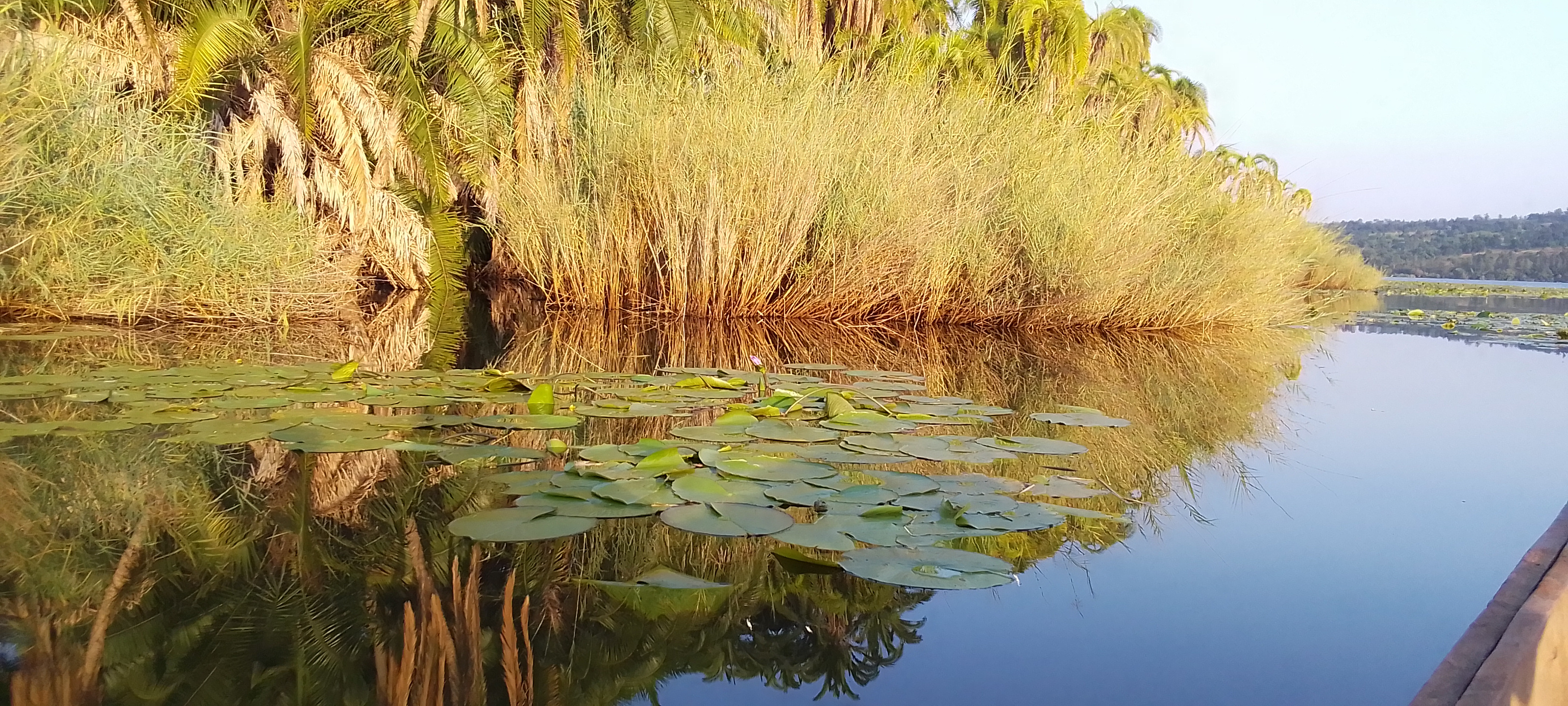
Water hyacinth in Lake Rwihinda

Floating plants on the lake are mostly nymphaea, potamogeton and utricularia species. The lake is surrounded by a wooded savanna with species of Acacia and Combretum, which are being cleared for agriculture. Akagwa Island in the middle of the lake has undisturbed vegetation dominated by Phoenix reclinata, with other plants such as Cyperus papyrus and Phragmites mauritianus.

== Protection ==
Lake Rwihinda is the only northern lake to have been protected for some time, with the goal of conserving its rich variety of birds. A management plan for the lake was published in 2005. The lake was part of the Lacs du Nord Aquatic Landscape Protected Area that was created in 2006. It was protected as a “Managed Natural Reserve” under the management plan for the Bugesera aquatic landscapes defined in 2011. It is now part of the Protected Aquatic Landscape of the North. Rwihinda, lac aux oiseaux is on the Tentative List for consideration as a UNESCO World Heritage Site.

The number of waterbirds has been descreasing, but efforts to create a 50 metres (160 ft) wide buffer zone around the lake have improved the biodivesity habitat. A poorly conceived campaign to introduce oil palm cultivation in the Bugesera region caused farmers to clear part of the buffer zone. Under a government-sponsored program, part of the Nyavyamo marsh connecting Lake Rwihinda to the Akanyaru River will soon be developed for agriculture. Unless carefully managed, this could cause the lake to dry up.

== Sources ==
- Burundi Environmental Threats and Opportunities Assessment (ETOA) (PDF), United States Agency for International Development (USAID), September 2010, archived from the original (PDF) on February 22, 2017
- Fiche descriptive sur les zones humides Ramsar (FDR) (PDF) (in French), 14 March 2013
- Kagera TAMP - Bugesera aquatic landscapes endowed with a management plan, Kirundo province, Burundi: FAO, 8 July 2011
- Nzigidahera, Benoît; Fofo, Alphonse (March 2005b), Réserve Gérée du Lac Rwihinda: Plan de gestion (PDF), INECN
- Plan régional de mise en œuvre de la Stratégie Nationale et Plan d’Action sur la Biodiversité dans la dépression de Bugesera 2013-2020 (PDF) (in French), Bujumbura: Institut National pour l’Environnement et la Conservation de la Nature (INECN), November 2013
- USAID/Burundi Foreign Assistance Act Sections 118/119 Tropical Forests and Biodiversity Analysis (PDF), June 2022, archived from the original (PDF) on August 1, 2023
- "Relation: Lac Rwihinda (2315763)", OpenStreetMap
