= Lake Cohoha =

Lake between Rwanda and Burundi

Lake Cyohoha South
- Lake Cohoha, Cyohoha Sud
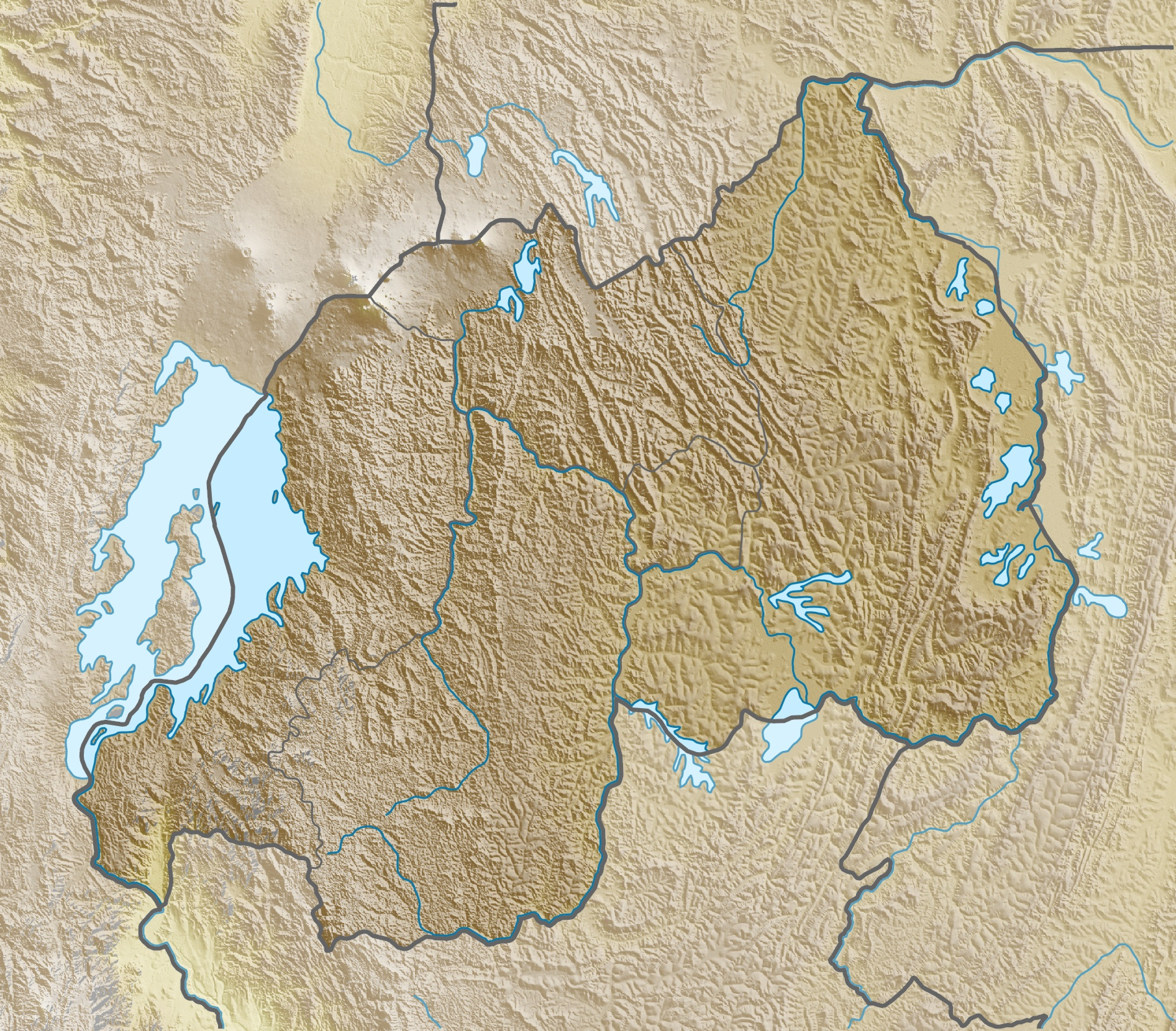
- Location within Rwanda
- Location: Burundi and Rwanda
- Coordinates: 02°25′28″S 30°06′20″E
- Type: lake
- Basin countries: Burundi, Rwanda
- Max. length: 32 km (20 mi)
- Surface area: 74 km^{2} (30 sq mi)
- Average depth: 5 m (16 ft)
- Max. depth: 7 m (23 ft)
- Surface elevation: 1,348 m (4,423 ft)

Lake Cyohoha South or Cyohoha Sud as it is known in Rwanda or Lake Cohoha in Burundi is a small lake in East Africa. It straddles the border between Burundi and Rwanda.

== Name ==
In Rwanda, the lake is known as Cyohoha South to differentiate it from the nearby much smaller Cyohoha North 10 miles north in Rwanda. In Burundi, it is simply known as Cohoha.

== Location ==
Lake Cyohoha is ten miles West of the larger Lake Rweru, the second lake on the Rwanda - Burundi border. It is a narrow yet very long lake with many branches. It is largely bisected by the border between Rwanda and Burundi, however, its southern portion extends entirely into Burundi.

Lake Cyohoha is 32 kilometres (20 mi) long, and has an average width of 1 kilometre (0.62 mi). The maximum width is 2 kilometres (1.2 mi). The lake covers 74 square kilometres (29 sq mi), of which 19 square kilometres (7.3 sq mi) are in Rwanda and 55 square kilometres (21 sq mi) belong to Burundi.

== Hydrology ==
Lake Cohoha is fed by the Rugamura Marsh, which in turn is fed by the Gatunguru River, the Runyoni River and the Nduruma River. The Nduruma River is fed by the Matonnyanga to the north of Mukerwas colline, by the Runyuiya to the south of Rwimbogo colline and by the Gasuga, which forms between the Kabirizi and Butihinda collines. (Note: There is some confusion between the Nduruma tributary of the Rugamura Marsh and the larger Nduruma River further to the east. A 2012 report on investment opportunities in renewable energy in Burundi includes a map that shows the larger Nduruma River extending beyond its source on the Defense Mapping Agency's 1994 map, then turning southwest and flowing to Lake Cohoha. The reality is that the eastern Nduruma River is fed by an unnamed tributary that flows from the Butihinda colline, not far from the source of the Gasuga tributary of the western Nduruma River.)

Lake Cyohoha South just as its cousin Cyohoha North empties into the Akanyaru River via a series of marshlands that connect these lakes to the river.

== Sources ==
- Investment opportunities in renewable energy Burundi (PDF), Minister for Energy and Mines, October 2012, p. 14
- U.S. Defense Mapping Agency (1994), Kirundo (PDF), University of Texas at Austin
- U.S. Defense Mapping Agency (1994), Lac Cohoha, University of Texas at Austin
