= Collines of Burundi =

The Communes of Burundi are divided into 2,639 collines. Colline means "hill" in French, one of the three official languages of the country. After a parliamentary vote, a proposed new territorial subdivision was voted. With this new subdivision, the number of collines will be increased to 3,044.

Collines serve as the base level for community decision-making, often with elected colline councils playing a key role in local governance and conflict resolution.

These collines are home to roughly 90% of Burundi's rural population, many of whom rely on hill-based subsistence agriculture, but they are increasingly threatened by soil erosion and landslides exacerbated by climate change.

The current collines are listed below, by commune:

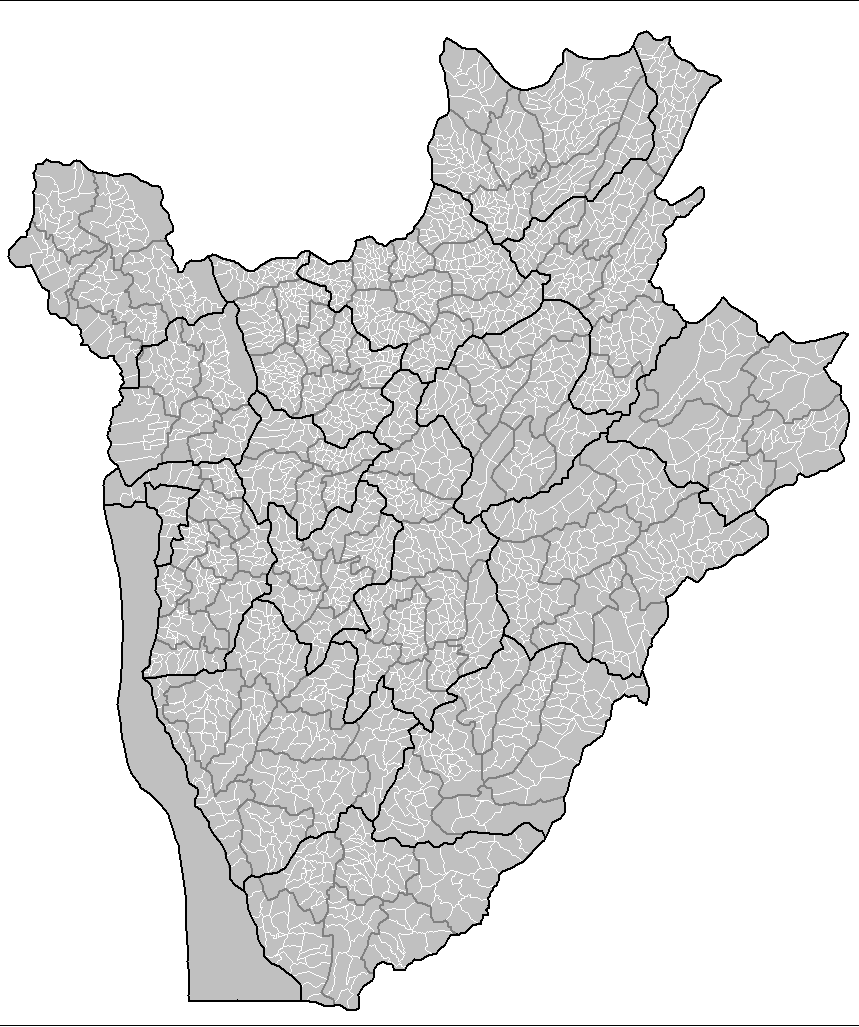
Collines of Burundi

== Bisoro ==
- Buburu
- Buhabwa
- Gitaramuka
- Kanka
- Kariba
- Kiganda
- Kirika
- Kivoga
- Mabaya
- Masango
- Mashunzi
- Munanira
- Musumba
- Nyabisiga
- Rubamvye
- Rutovu

== Bubanza ==
- Buhororo
- Buvyuko
- Ciya
- Gahongore
- Gatura
- Gitanga
- Karinzi
- Kazeke
- Kivyiru
- Mitakataka
- Mugimbu
- Muhanza
- Muhenga
- Muramba
- Mwanda
- Ngara
- Nyabitaka
- Rugunga
- Rurabo
- Shari
- Urban Center
- Zina

== Bugabira ==
- Gaturanda
- Gitwe
- Kigina
- Kigoma
- Kiri
- Kiyonza
- Nyabikenke
- Nyakarama
- Rubuga
- Rugasa

== Buganda ==
- Cunyu
- Gasenyi
- Kaburantwa
- Kagunuzi
- Kasega
- Murambi
- Muremera
- Mwunguzi
- Ndava
- Nimba
- Nyamitanga
- Ruhagarika

== Bugarama ==
- Burangwa
- Cashi
- Gahuni
- Gitwaro
- Janda
- Kagoma
- Kayombe
- Kizuga
- Magara I
- Magara II
- Magara III
- Magara IV
- Mihongoro
- Mugendo
- Nyabungere
- Nyagushwe
- Saga

== Bugendana ==
- Bitare
- Carire
- Cishwa
- Gaterama
- Gitongo
- Gitora
- Jenda
- Kibasi
- Kibundo
- Mirama
- Mugitega
- Mukoro
- Mutoyi
- Mwurire
- Nikanda
- Nyagisenyi
- Nyakeru
- Nyamagana
- Runyeri
- Rushanga
- Rwingiri
- Wiruvu

== Bugenyuzi ==
- Bhindye
- Bihemba
- Bonero
- Nyagoba
- Rugazi
- Ruharo
- Rusasa
- Rusenga
- Rwandagaro
- Rwimbogo
- Teme

== Buhiga ==
- Buhiga
- Buhinyuza
- Burenza
- Bushirambeho
- Cigati
- Gasenyi
- Gisenyi
- Gitanga
- Kajeri
- Kanyange
- Karamba
- Karunyinya
- Karuri
- Magamba
- Mayenzi
- Muhweza
- Miwoya
- Nkoronko
- Nyamabega
- Nzibariba
- Ramvya
- Rudaraza
- Rukamba
- Rutonganikwa
- Ruyaga
- Rweya
- Shanga
- Urban Center

== Buhinyuza ==
- Bugungu
- Buhinyuza
- Bunywana
- Butihinda
- Bwasira
- Gasave
- Gihongo
- Gitaramuka
- Jarama
- Kara
- Karehe
- Karongwe
- Kibimba
- Kiyange
- Mabago
- Muramba
- Ntobwe
- Nyabucugu
- Nyagishiru
- Nyankurazo
- Nyaruhengeri
- Nyarunazi
- Rugazi
- Rugongo
- Ruvumu

== Bujumbura Mairie ==
- Buterere
- Buyenzi
- Bwiza
- Cibitoke
- Gihosha
- Kamenge
- Kanyosha
- Kinama
- Kinindo
- Musaga
- Ngagara
- Nyakabiga
- Rohero

== Bukemba ==
- Bugiga
- Bukemba
- Butare
- Gihofi
- Murama
- Rutanga

== Bukeye ==
- Buhorwa
- Burarana
- Busangana
- Busekara
- Gahaga
- Gaharo
- Gashishima
- Gikonge
- Kigereka
- Kivogero
- Kiziguro
- Musumba
- Nyambo
- Nyarucamo
- Rusha
- Rwantsinda
- Rweteto
- Shumba

== Bukinanyana ==
- Bihembe
- Bubegwa
- Bumba
- Burimbi
- Burkinanyana
- Gahabura
- Gakomero
- Giserama
- Kibati
- Kibaya
- Munyinya
- Nderama
- Nyampinda
- Nyamyeha
- Nyangwe
- Nyarubugu
- Nyarwumba
- Rehembe
- Rtyazo
- Rusenda
- Sehe
- Shimwe

== Bukirasazi ==
- Buhanda
- Bukirasazi
- Bunyuka
- Gasongati
- Kibere
- Kibuye
- Migano
- Mpingwe
- Buhanda
- Nyambuye
- Nyamisure
- Rugabano
- Rugoma
- Rukoki
- Ruvumu
- Rwinyana
- Shaya
- Tema

== Burambi ==
- Bisaka
- Buhinyuza
- Busaga
- Busura
- Buyenzi
- Gahinda
- Gakonko
- Gatobo
- Gisenyi
- Gishiha
- Gitaba
- Gitaramuka
- Gitongwe
- Magana
- Maramvya
- Murara
- Murenge
- Muzi
- Rumonyi
- Rutwenzi
- Rwaniro

== Buraza ==
- Bibate
- Bubaji
- Bugega
- Buraza
- Buriza
- Butemba
- Butezi
- Gicure
- Gisura
- Gitaramuka
- Kabumbe
- Mahonda
- Maza
- Mugano
- Musebeyi
- Muyange
- Ndago
- Ndava
- Rweza

== Bururi ==
- Buhinga
- Burarana
- Burenza
- Burunga
- Gahago
- Gasenyi
- Gatanga
- Gisanze
- Jungwe
- Karwa
- Kiganda
- Kiremba
- Mahonda
- Mubuga
- Mudahandwa
- Mugozi
- Munini
- Murago
- Muzima
- Nyamiyaga
- Nyarugera
- Nyarwaga
- Nyavyamo
- Rukanda
- Rushemeza
- Ruvumu
- Tongwe
- Urban Center

== Busiga ==
- Bigera
- Bitambwe
- Caga
- Cendajuru
- Gahini
- Gatika
- Gitemezi
- Kavumu
- Kididiri
- Kigufi
- Kimagara
- Kinyami
- Kirimba
- Magana
- Makombe
- Mihama
- Mpago
- Mparamirundi
- Mpondogoto
- Munyange
- Murambi
- Mureme
- Mutsindi
- Mutumba
- Muyogoro
- Nyabizinu
- Nyamisebo
- Nyange
- Nyanza Tubiri
- Rubari
- Rugori
- Rumbaga
- Rwanyege

== Busoni ==
- Buhimba
- Burara
- Buringa
- Gatare
- Gatemere
- Gatete
- Gisenyi
- Gitete
- Higiro
- Kabanga
- Kagege
- Karambo
- Kibonde
- Kididiri
- Kigoma
- Kiravumba
- Kivo
- Kumana
- Marembo
- Mugobe
- Mukerwa
- Munazi
- Munyinya
- Murore
- Mutambi
- Muvyuko
- Muyange
- Nyabisindu
- Nyabugeni
- Nyagisozi
- Nyakizu
- Renga
- Rugarama
- Ruheha
- Runyinya
- Rurende
- Rurira
- Rutabo
- Ruvaga
- Rwibikare
- Sigu

== Kinama ==
- Quartier Gitega
- Q. Ruyigi
- Q. Bubanza
- Q. Muyinga
- Q. Muramvya

== Mpanda ==
- Park National de la Kibra
- Nyeshanga
- Buringa
- Ninga
- Ruhahe
- Mpanda
- Butanuka
- Ruziba
- Butembe
- Kivyibusha
- Kanenga
- Gihanga
- Murira
- Rumotomoto
- Buramata
- Kizina
- Gifurwe
- Gahwazi
- Gatagura
- Nyomvyi
- Masha
- Cabiza
- Rugunga
- Kagwema
- Gihungwe
- Busongo
- Muyange
- Musenyi
- Nyamabere
- Rugenge
- Rubira
- Murengeza
- Muzinda
- Mutara
- Kibenga
- Butanuka
- Kirengane
- Rutake
- Ruce
- Giseza
- Kabanga
- Rwamvurwe
- Rugazi
- Kibuye
- Nyenkarange
- Kayange
- Bugume
- Karambira

== Nyakabiga ==
- Kigwati
- Nyakabiga I
- Nyakabiga II
- Nyakabiga III

== See also ==
- Makamba
- Vugizo
- Kiyazi
- Rutegama
- Rurambira

Nyanza-Lac
