= Lake Rweru =

Body of water shared by Burundi and Rwanda

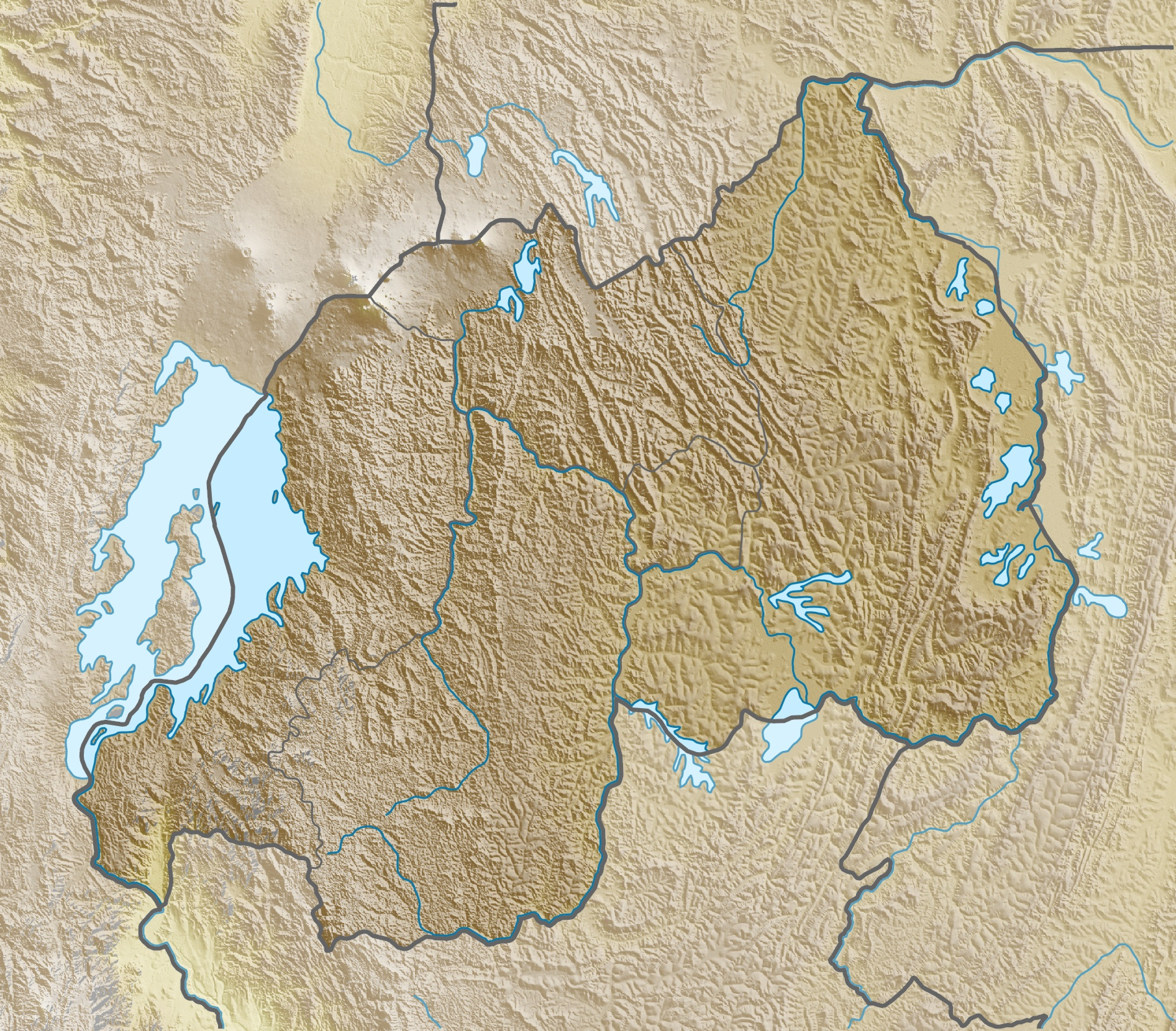
- Location within Rwanda
- Location: Burundi
- Coordinates: 2°22′40″S 30°19′25″E
- Type: Lake
- Primary outflows: Kagera River
- Basin countries: Burundi, Rwanda
- Surface area: 100 km^{2} (40 sq mi)
- Average depth: 2.1 m (10 ft)
- Max. depth: 3.9 m (10 ft)
- Shore length^{1}: 76 km (50 miles)
- Surface elevation: 1,325 m (4,350 ft)
- ^{1} Shore length is not a well-defined measure.

Lake Rweru is a lake close to the northernmost point of Burundi in central Africa. The northern shore of the lake forms part of Burundi's border with Rwanda. It is the most distant origin point of the Nile River. The Kagera River, considered by many as the start point of the Nile, rises at the northern part of the lake, located in Rwanda.

== Geography ==
The lake has a surface area of 100 km^{2} (40 sq mi) between two countries, Burundi (80 km^{2} (30 sq mi)) and Rwanda (20 km^{2} (10 sq mi)). The lake has a shoreline of approximately 76 km. The lake is very shallow in most parts and has a mean depth of 2.1 m with its maximum depth at 3 m located in Burundi. The Kagera River flows out of the lake in Burundi and flows east along Rwanda's border until it joins the Ruvubu River.

== Controversy ==
In August 2014 fishermen in Burundi living around the lake in the Muyinga Province recovered over 40 unidentified bodies floating in the lake. Most of the bodies were wrapped in plastic. The bodies recovered were in the advance stages of decomposition, alarming the local villagers due to health concerns. Burundi claims that all the bodies recovered were Rwandan by nationality and there are no credible conclusions to how the bodies were killed. Both countries deny that the bodies are their citizens. The Federal Bureau of Investigation from the United States agreed to take the case after both countries showed lack of interest to look into the matter.

== See also ==
- Kagera River
