= Mukazye River =

River in Burundi

- Location within Burundi
- Native name: Rivière Mukazye (French)

Location
- Country: Burundi
- Province: Bubanza Province

Physical characteristics
- Mouth: Mukazye River
  - coordinates: 3.806743°S 30.320957°E

The Mukazye River (French: Rivière Mukazye) is a river in southeastern Burundi, a tributary of the Malagarasi River.

== Course ==
The Mukazye River originates in Ruyigi Province and flows south into Rutana Province, then turns east and joins the Malagarasi River.

== Environment ==
The surroundings of Mukazye are mainly savannah forest. The area had 70 inhabitants per square kilometer as of 2016. The average annual temperature is 21 °C (70 °F). The warmest month is September, when the average temperature is 25 °C (77 °F), and the coldest is May, with 20 °C (68 °F). Average annual rainfall is 1,373 millimetres (54.1 in). The wettest month is March, with an average of 243 millimetres (9.6 in) of precipitation, and the driest is July, with 1 millimetre (0.039 in) of precipitation.

== Marshes ==
The marshes in the watershed of the Mukazye and the north of the Malagalazi cover 8,591 hectares (21,230 acres) of which 3,012 hectares (7,440 acres) or 35% are cultivated. This excludes the basin of the upper Malagarazi and its tributaries, the Mutzindozi River and Muyovozi River, and excludes the Malagarazi's downstream tributaries the Rumpungwe River and Rugusye River.

The Mukazye flows through three marshes in the Commune of Kinyinya, Ruyigi Province, none of which are managed. These are the 40 hectares (99 acres) Mucankende Marsh, the 700 hectares (1,700 acres) Ntanga Marsh and the 62 hectares (150 acres) Nyakagege Marsh.

In 2015 work was underway to develop the Mukazye marsh in the Commune of Giharo, Rutana Province. In March 2023 it was decided to expropriate rice farmers in the Mukazye, Mazimero, Gatonga, Kinwa and Nyamikungu marshes of the Commune of Giharo, and transfer the fields to SOSUMO to grow sugar cane. This plan was later suspended. However, as of October 2023, 800 rice farmers in the Mukazye marsh had lacked irrigation water for three months. They said the head of their association had blocked the pipes and sold two irrigation machines owned by the association.

== Conservation ==
The Mukazye Managed Nature Reserve (Réserve Naturelle Gérée de Mukazye) contains papyrus groves on the lower course of the Mukazye River and the banks of the Malaragazi River in the Commune of Giharo. It has rich biodiversity. People live in the riparian zone and engage in fishing and harvesting grasses. The management plan aims to preserve undisturbed habitats for biodiversity, maintain favorable conditions for resident and migratory birds, support tourism and educational visits, while allowing sustainable fishing and harvesting of papyrus and other marsh grasses by the local people where compatible with the other objectives.

== See also ==
- List of rivers of Burundi

== Sources ==
- Bigirimana, Christian (16 July 2015), "Union Européenne-FIDA : le PROPA-O sur une bonne lancée", Iwacu (in French)
- Monographie de la Commune Kinyinya (PDF) (in French), Ruyigi: Ministere de la planification du developpement et de la reconstruction nationale, September 2006
- NASA Earth Observations: Population Density, NASA/SEDAC, archived from the original on 9 February 2016
- NASA Earth Observations Data Set Index, NASA, archived from the original on 28 November 2017
- NASA Earth Observations: Rainfall (1 month - TRMM), NASA/Tropical Rainfall Monitoring Mission, archived from the original on 19 April 2019
- NASA Earth Observations: Land Cover Classification, NASA/MODIS, archived from the original on 28 February 2016
- Ngendakuriyo, Bertrand (18 October 2023), "Les rizières du marais de Mukazye en province Rutana menacées de sécher", Radio Inzamba (in French)
- Nzigidahera, Benoît; Nindorera, Damien (September 2009), Plan de gestion et d’amenagement de la Reserve Naturelle de la Malagarazi (PDF) (in French), Bujumbura: Institut National pour l’Environnement et la Conservation de la Nature
- Stratégie Agricole Nationale 2008–2015 (PDF), Bujumbura: Ministere de l’agriculture et de l’elevage, July 2008
- "Way: Mukazye (314728635)", OpenStreetMap
