= Gihofi =

- Location in Burundi
- Coordinates: 4.02876°S 30.13921°E
- Country: Burundi
- Province: Rutana Province
- Elevation: 1,383 m (4,537 ft)
- Time zone: UTC+2 (Central Africa Time)

Gihofi is a city in eastern Burundi. It is located in Rutana Province close to the border with Tanzania, to the south of Mount Kikizi and southeast of Rutana.

== SOSUMO ==
Gihofi holds the headquarters of Moso Sugar Company (SOSUMO), created in 1988. The establishment of SOSUMO led to settlement of the region. The company built a large neighborhood to house its employees, separated into blocks for different categories from directors down to middle managers, technicians and ordinary employees. Private neighborhoods were also built in what developed into an urban center with a regional hospital and an airfield, banks and other institutions. For uneducated youth, a job with SOSUMO gives hope for the future, although only some are employed, and then only for seasonal work.

== Hospital ==
The town is home to the Gihofi Hospital, a public district hospital in the Gihofi Health District serving a population of 198,234 as of 2014. The hospital is in the south of Gihofi, to the east of Gihofi Airport. It was inaugurated by Pierre Nkurunziza, President of Burundi, on 25 April 2014. The hospital had 118 beds, and would cover the Commune of Bukemba, Commune of Gitanga and Commune of Giharo. Services include internal medicine, ultrasound and maternity, surgery, pediatrics, neonatology, laboratory and radiography.

== Sources ==
- Financement base sur la performance HD Gihofi (in French), Ministere de la Sante Publique et de la Lutte Contre le Sida

Iriho, Clovis (2021), "Le travail ouvrier au Burundi : identité et conditions socio-économiques des ouvriers de l'usine sucrière de la SOSUMO", Les Cahiers d'Afrique de l'Est (in French), 56, doi:10.4000/eastafrica.1535

- Ndabashinze, Rénovat (29 April 2014), "3,7 milliards de Fbu pour la construction de l'hôpital de district de Gihofi", Iwacu (in French)
- "Way: Hôpital Gihofi (785849857)", OpenStreetMap
