= Gihofi Hospital =

Geography
- Location: Rutana Province, Burundi
- Coordinates: 4.0324°S 30.14036°E

Organisation
- Care system: Public

Links
- Lists: Hospitals in Burundi

The Gihofi Hospital (French: Hôpital de Gihofi) is a hospital in Rutana Province, Burundi.

== Location ==
The Gihofi Hospital is a public district hospital in the Gihofi Health District serving a population of 198,234 as of 2014. It is in the south of the district, to the southeast of Rutana. The hospital is in the south of the town of Gihofi, to the east of Gihofi Airport.

== Events ==
Gihofi Hospital was inaugurated by Pierre Nkurunziza, President of Burundi, on 25 April 2014. The hospital had 118 beds, and would cover the Commune of Bukemba, Commune of Gitanga and Commune of Giharo. Services include internal medicine, ultrasound and maternity, surgery, pediatrics, neonatology, laboratory and radiography. Equipment was provided by the European Union through the Amagara meza project.

== Sources ==
- Carte Sanitaire du Burundi (PDF), Burundi Ministry of Public Health, 2016
- Financement base sur la performance HD Gihofi (in French), Ministere de la Sante Publique et de la Lutte Contre le Sida
- Ndabashinze, Rénovat (29 April 2014), "3,7 milliards de Fbu pour la construction de l'hôpital de district de Gihofi", Iwacu (in French)
- "Way: Hôpital Gihofi (785849857)", OpenStreetMap
