= Rukoziri River =

River in Burundi

- Location within Burundi
- Native name: Rivière Rukoziri (French)

Location
- Country: Burundi

Physical characteristics
- Mouth: Malagarasi River
  - coordinates: 4.28091°S 30.00295°E

The Rukoziri (French: Rivière Rukoziri) is a river in southern Burundi, a tributary of the Malagarasi River.

== Course ==
The Rukoziri River is the first major affluent of the Malagarazi River downstream from its source, the Nyakabanda being the second. The Rukoziri has its source in the mountains which separate the Kumoso depression from the Central plateaus of Burundi.

The Rukoziri, like other tributaries of the Malagarazi such as the Mutsindozi, Musasa and Rumpungwe, flows down the slopes of the Mirwa where its bed is cut into deep valleys. During dry periods the flow is modest, but in the rainy season it is torrential, with frequent violent floods.

The Rukoziri River rises to the southwest of Makamba and flows in a generally southeast direction through the Buragane natural region to the Malagarazi on the Burundi-Tanzania border. The Buragane and Moso-Sud regions cover the vast valleys of the Rukoziri River and the Mutsindozi River.

== Exploitation ==
A report prepared in 2000 for the FAO recommended resettling displaced persons in the 750 hectares (1,900 acres) Rukoziri marshes in the province of Makamba. These marshes had been developed and irrigated, and could be cultivated during three growing seasons. 0.5 hectares (1.2 acres) should be enough for each family. The demographic pressure in this area was very low, so it was underexploited. A 2009 report for the FAO recommended extending the irrigated perimeter of the Rukoziri marsh from 800 to 2,000 hectares (2,000 to 4,900 acres) at a cost of US$2.4 million.

== See also ==
- List of rivers of Burundi

== Sources ==
- Bigirimana, Anatole; Kisekelwa, Tchalondawa; da Costa, Luis M.; Muzumani, Donatien R.; Mulelenu, Christian Mukweze; Abwe, Emmanuel; Banyankimbona, Gaspard; Vreven, Emmanuel (2024), "An Updated Checklist of the Fishes from the Upper Malagarazi (Lake Tanganyika Basin) in Burundi: Implications for an under Implementation Malagarazi Nature Reserve", Diversity, 16 (7: 417), doi:10.3390/d16070417
- Nduwumwami, Damas (2011), Étude d'Impact sur l'Environnement et de Sauvegarde Sociale (PDF) (in French), Office des Routes
- Nyberg Oskarsson, Gunilla (2004), "Le mouvement pentecôtiste- une communauté alternative au sud du Burundi, 1935-1960." (PDF), Studia Missionalia Svecana (in French), vol. XCV, Uppsala, ISBN 91-85424-86-2
- Programme national de securite alimentaire (PNSA) (2009-2015) (PDF) (in French), FAO, February 2009
- Resume de l'etude d'impact environnemental et social du projet d'amenagement des routes Mabanda Mugina (Burundi) et Rubavu – Gisiza (Rwanda) (PDF) (in French), OITC, January 2012
- Schema directeur d'amenagement et de mise en valeur des marais (PDF) (in French), Bujumbura: FAO, September 2000
