= List of rivers of Burundi =

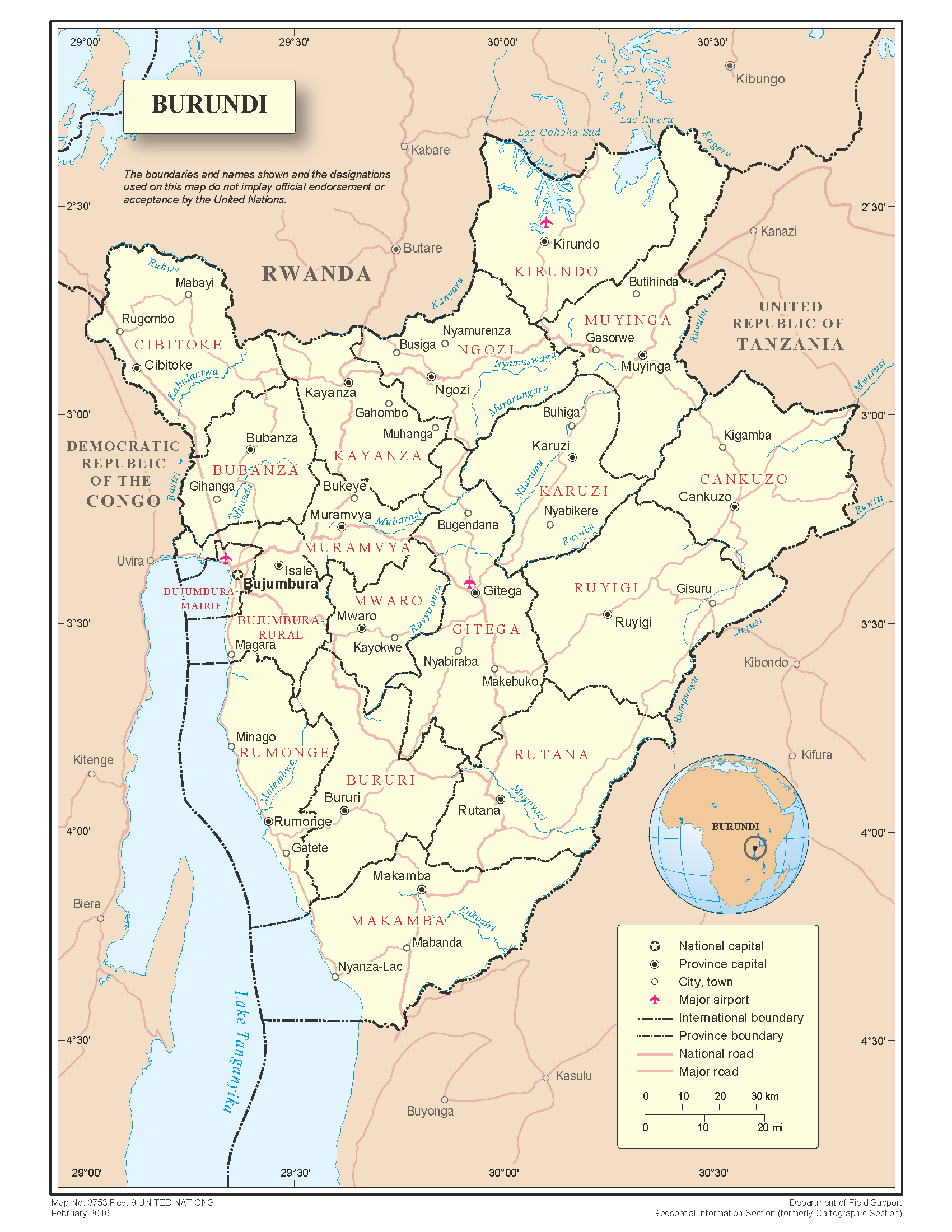
Map of Burundi showing the main rivers and tributaries.

This list of rivers in Burundi is a partial list of the larger rivers, arranged by drainage basin, with tributaries indented under each parent stream's name. The coordinates given for each river are those of the mouth, if in Burundi, or of the last point in Burundi if the river flows into Rwanda or Tanzania.

== Lake Victoria ==
Lake Victoria drains through the Victoria Nile, White Nile and Nile into the Mediterranean Sea. The Burundi portion of the Lake Victoria Basin drains via the Kagera River (2.41231°S 30.54727°E), through its tributaries the Akanyaru River in the west, Lake Rweru in the north, and the Rurubu River in the center and east of Burundi.

=== Akanyaru basin ===
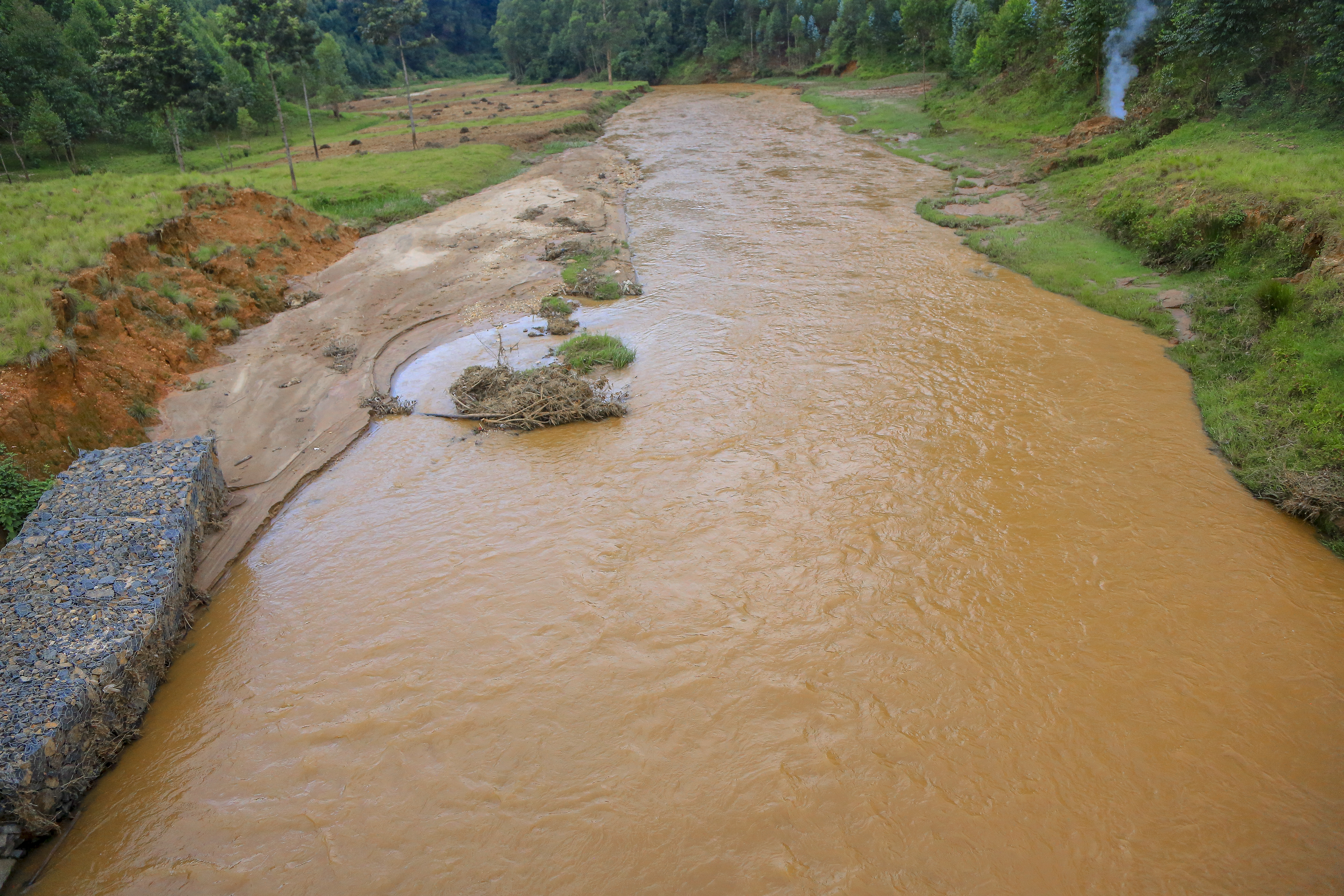
Akanyaru River

The Akanyaru River, which leaves Burundi at 2.32429°S 29.96195°E, defines the border between northern Burundi to the east and southern Rwanda to the west. It joins the Nyabarongo River in Rwanda, a tributary of the Kagera River.

Right tributaries flowing from Burundi include:

- Mwogere River 2.807382°S 29.606196°E
- Kayava River 2.818840°S 29.719262°E
- Buyongwe River 2.74780°S 29.89586°E
- Ndurumu River 2.73035°S 29.964927°E
- Nyavyamo Marsh 2.48020°S 29.96993°E
- Lake Cohoha 2.32932°S 29.96238°E

=== Lake Rweru basin ===
Lake Rweru is drained by the Kagera River and/or the Nyabarongo River depending on the time of year. Rivers flowing into the lake from Burundi include:

- Nyamabuno River 2.41917°S 30.39181°E
- Kabuyenge River 2.52450°S 30.33463°E
- Nduruma River 2.51819°S 30.32754°E
- Muhembuzi River 2.46901°S 30.27163°E

=== Rurubu basin ===
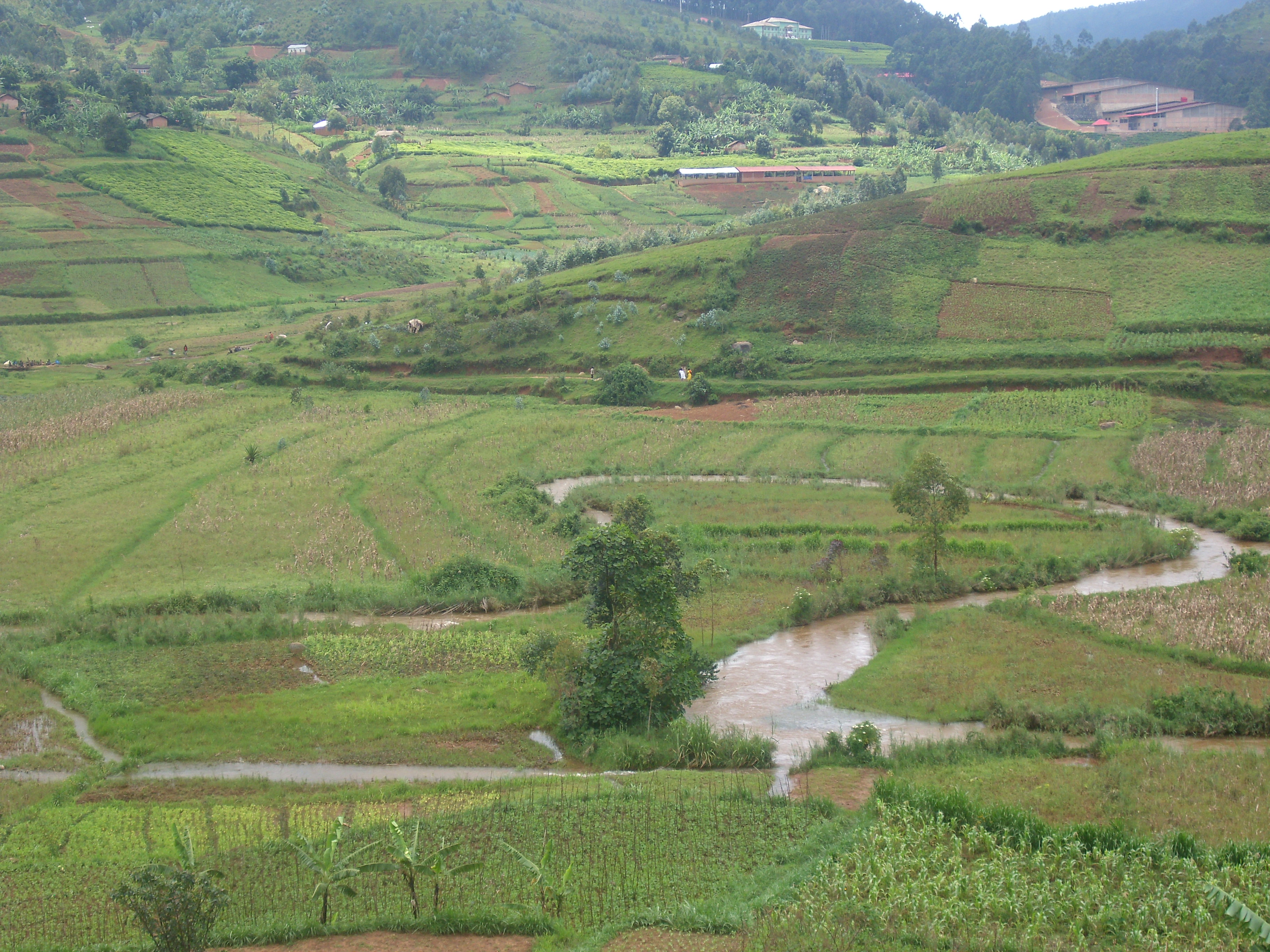
Mubarazi River

The Rurubu River, which leaves Burundi at 2.65087°S 30.53341°E, drains most of central and northern Burundi. It is a tributary of the Kagera River.

Right tributaries include:

- Mubarazi River 3.180805°S 29.92297°E
  - Kaniga River 3.25484°S 29.81030°E
- Ruvyironza River 3.343984°S 29.992526°E
- Nyabaha River 3.371767°S 30.041631°E
  - Sanzu River 3.42398°S 30.07939°E
  - Nyakijanda River 3.42446°S 30.07914°E
- Kayongozi River 3.24408°S 30.25710°E

Left tributaries include:

- Kinyankuru River 3.08583°S 29.92639°E
  - Nyakijima River 2.969615°S 29.928011°E
  - Nyamuswaga River 2.969529°S 29.928293°E
  - Nyabusyo River 3.059138°S 29.939429°E
  - Nyakagezi River 3.00443°S 29.93356°E
- Ndurumu River 3.247455°S 30.028135°E
- Kavuruga River 2.86178°S 30.40586°E
- Cizanye River 2.654232°S 30.526403°E

== Lake Tanganyika ==
Lake Tanganyika drains through the Lukuga River, Lualaba River and Congo River into the Atlantic Ocean. The west and south of Burundi drains into the lake.

=== Via the Ruzizi River ===
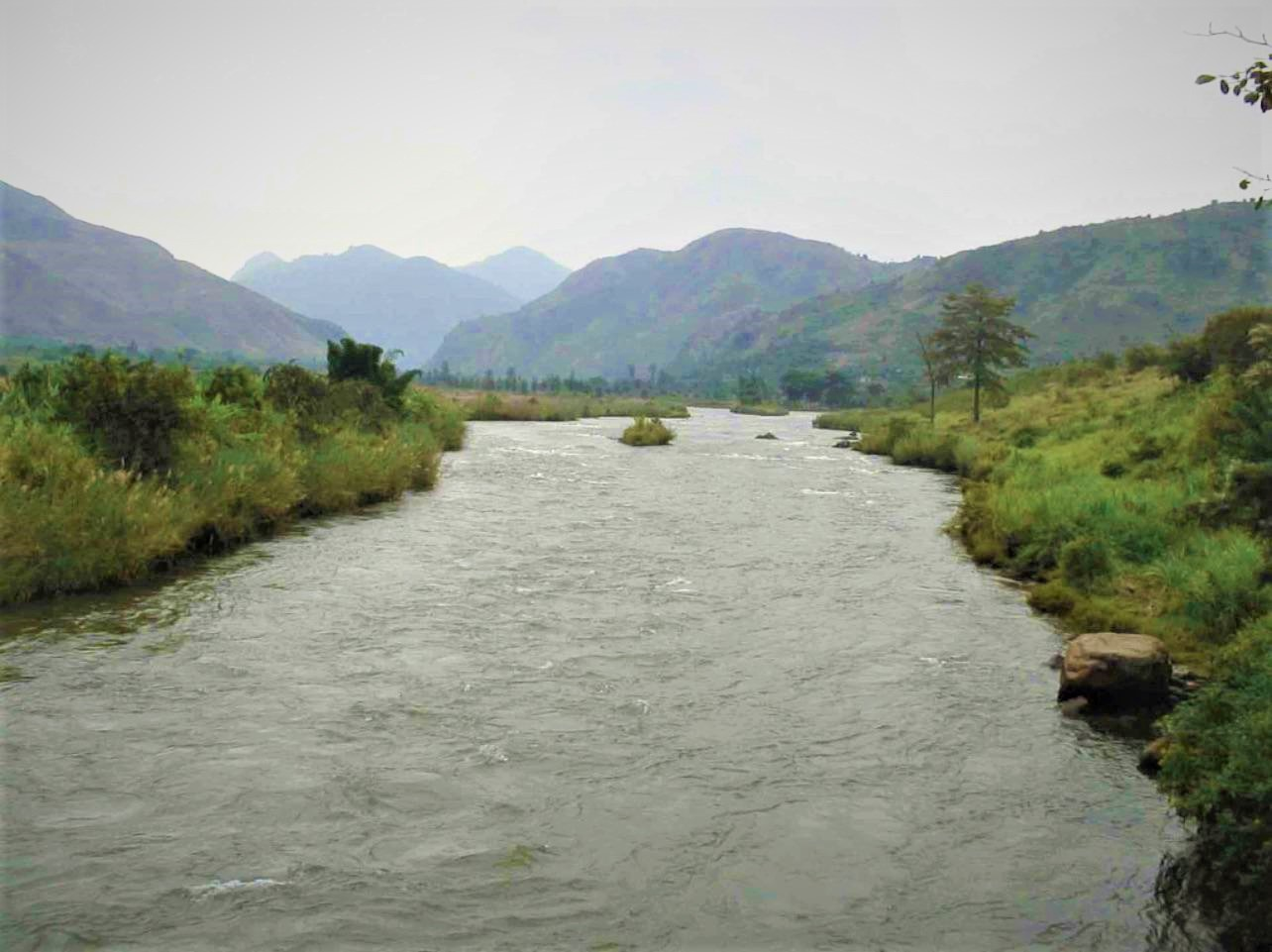
Ruzizi River

The Ruzizi River flows south from Lake Kivu to Lake Tanganyika, forming the boundary between Burundi and the Democratic Republic of the Congo. Several rivers in Burundi flow west from the Congo-Nile ridge into the Ruzizi.

- Ruzizi River 3.35919°S 29.26758°E
  - Ruhwa River 2.74283°S 29.04076°E
  - Nyakagunda River 2.839639°S 29.062732°E
  - Nyamagana River 2.93435°S 29.133044°E
  - Muhira River 2.946185°S 29.150704°E
  - Kaburantwa River 3.01841°S 29.22475°E
  - Kagunuzi River 3.04397°S 29.24643°E
    - Kitenge River 2.948608°S 29.427927°E
  - Kajeke River 3.26837°S 29.24865°E
  - Mpanda River 3.313783°S 29.276974°E

=== Directly into Lake Tanganyika ===
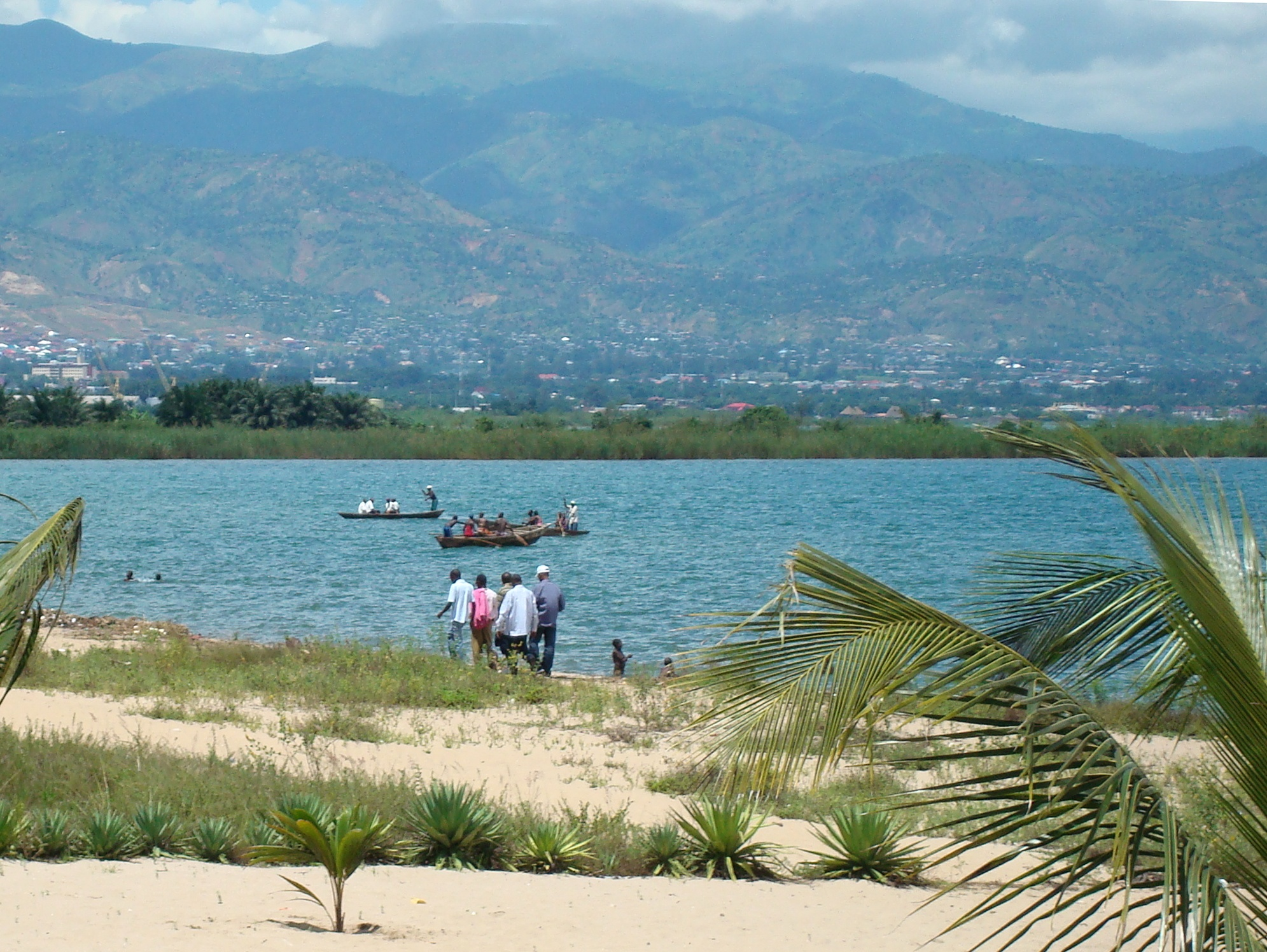
Bujumbura & Lake Tanganyika

Lake Tanganyika forms the western boundary of Burundi south of the Ruzizi. Various rivers empty directly ino the lake:

- Mutimbuzi River 3.359295°S 29.327646°E
- Ntahangwa River 3.37373°S 29.33842°E
- Muha River 3.400951°S 29.342283°E
- Kanyosha River 3.431795°S 29.340470°E
- Mugere River 3.484126°S 29.33228°E
- Kirasa River 3.59695°S 29.34765°E
- Ruzibazi River 3.73170°S 29.31350°E
- Dama River 3.96578°S 29.42052°E
- Murembwe River 4.01198°S 29.42969°E
  - Jiji River 3.88845°S 29.55797°E
  - Siguvyaye River 3.95199°S 29.51687°E
- Buzimba River 4.06288°S 29.46808°E
- Nyengwe River 4.19183°S 29.53724°E
- Rwaba River 4.33507°S 29.58760°E

=== Via the Malagarasi River ===
The Malagarasi River originates near Lake Tanganyika, and flows away from the lake, northeast along the boundary between southeast Burundi and Tanzania. It turn southwest, then south through Tanzania, then turns west and flows into Lake Tanganyika. It drains the southeast lowlands of Burundi. Major left tributaries in Burundi, from upstream to downstream, include:

- Malagarasi River 3.80764°S 30.40458°E (border)
  - Rukoziri River 4.28091°S 30.00295°E
  - Mutsindozi River 4.070364°S 30.182984°E
  - Muyovozi River 3.978869°S 30.222863°E
    - Musasa River 3.98831°S 30.079549°E
  - Mukazye River 3.806743°S 30.320957°E
  - Rumpungwe River 3.795235°S 30.401083°E
    - Rugusye River 3.559648°S 30.452009°E
  - Mwiruzi River 2.97992°S 30.84959°E (border)

== See also ==
- List of power stations in Burundi
