= Musasa River =

River in Burundi

- Location within Burundi
- Native name: Rivière Musasa (French)

Location
- Country: Burundi

Physical characteristics
- Mouth: Muyovozi River
  - coordinates: 3.98831°S 30.079549°E

The Musasa River (French: Rivière Musasa) is a river in the Rutana Province of Burundi. It is a right tributary of the Muyovozi River, which in turn is a left tributary of the Malagarasi River.

== Course ==
The Musasa forms in marshes between Gitanga and Museno collines in the Commune of Bukemba. It flows south between Kazeba and Kiremba collines. It turns to the east and is joined from the right (south) from the Maramvya colline by the Munyura and the Mugomera. It continues east-northeast past Butare colline then east past Murama colline to join the Muyovozi from the right. (Note: As of August 2024 OpenStreetMap showed the Muyovozi as a tributary of the Musasa, rather than the other way around. This is incorrect. The Musasa River is a right bank affluent of the Muyovozi River.) The Cikinga Falls are in the upper reaches of the river.

== Environment ==
The surroundings of the Musasa River are a mosaic of farmland and natural vegetation. The area is quite densely populated, with 239 inhabitants per square kilometer as of 2016. The average annual temperature in the area is 21 °C (70 °F). The warmest month is September, when the average temperature is 25 °C (77 °F), and the coldest is January, with 19 °C (66 °F). Average annual rainfall is 1,419 millimetres (55.9 in). The wettest month is March, with an average of 267 millimetres (10.5 in) of precipitation, and the driest is July, with 1 millimetre (0.039 in) of precipitation.

== Flooding ==
There are often annual floods in the Malagarazi swamp due to fluctuations in the level of the Musasa River.

In December 2021 the President of the National Platform for Risk Prevention and Disaster Management visited the site where the Kajeke River bed was being redeveloped in Gihanga Commune by Oxfam with European Union funding. After the bed had been redeveloped, grasses and trees would be planted to stabilize the banks. Oxfam planned to undertake a similar project on the Musasa River.

== Infrastructure ==
In January 2018 work was suspended on rehabilitating the bridge over the Musasa River between the Kazeba and Kiremba collines in the Gitanga Zone. Reinforcing bars, cement and stones had been stolen. The result was to greatly increase the cost of goods brought via the bridge to the Commune of Gitanga.

In December 2018 the government of Burundi issued a request for tenders for hydro-agricultural works in the Musasa marsh, which covers 142 hectares (350 acres) in the Commune of Gitanga and Commune of Bukemba, both in Rutana Province. The marsh is downstream from an old weir, which was destroyed by floods in 2015, and runs along the left bank of the river up to the RP405 road.

The Musama dam is on the Musama River in the Musasa marshes of Bugiga colline in the Commune of Bukemba. It was destroyed in 2020, and for three years over 800 households were unable to cultivate rice in the marshes. In March 2023 Gervais Ndirakobuca, Prime Minister of Burundi, visited the site to inspect the dam, which had been rehabilitated by the TUBEHONEZA project funded by the European Union.

== See also ==
- List of rivers of Burundi

== Sources ==
- Bigirimana, Anatole; Kisekelwa, Tchalondawa; da Costa, Luis M.; Muzumani, Donatien R.; Mulelenu, Christian Mukweze; Abwe, Emmanuel; Banyankimbona, Gaspard; Vreven, Emmanuel (2024), "An Updated Checklist of the Fishes from the Upper Malagarazi (Lake Tanganyika Basin) in Burundi: Implications for an under Implementation Malagarazi Nature Reserve", Diversity, 16 (7: 417), doi:10.3390/d16070417
- Gakiza, Dorine (10 March 2023), "Rutana:le 1er ministre visite le barrage d'iririgation de musama", Radio Télévision Nationale du Burundi (in French)
- NASA Earth Observations: Population Density, NASA/SEDAC, archived from the original on 9 February 2016
- NASA Earth Observations Data Set Index, NASA, archived from the original on 11 May 2020
- NASA Earth Observations: Rainfall (1 month - TRMM), NASA/Tropical Rainfall Monitoring Mission, archived from the original on 19 April 2019
- NASA Earth Observations: Land Cover Classification, NASA/MODIS, archived from the original on 28 February 2016
- Nkurunziza, Dieudonné (23 December 2021), "La rivière Kajeke bientôt rétablie dans son lit", Radio Télévision Nationale du Burundi (in French)
- Ntiranyibagira, Damase (28 December 2018), Avis d'appel d'offres international ouvert No DNCMP 48/T/2018-2019 (PDF) (in French), Ministry of Agriculture
- "Rutana : L'arrêt des travaux du pont de la rivière Musasa paralyse la commune Gitanga", Radio Publique Africaine (in French), 14 February 2018
- Sunzu Ntigambirizwa, Salvator (August 2009), Etudes de vulnerabilite et d’adaptation aux changements climatiques (PDF) (in French), Bujumbura: Ministère de l’Eau, de l’Environnement, de l’Aménagement du Territoire et de l’Urbanisme
- U.S. Defense Mapping Agency (1994), Makamba (PDF), University of Texas at Austin
- U.S. Defense Mapping Agency (1994), Nyakazu (PDF), University of Texas at Austin
- U.S. Defense Mapping Agency (1994), Rutana (PDF), University of Texas at Austin
- "Way: Musasa (308088714)", OpenStreetMap
