= SOSUMO =

Société Sucrière du Moso, SOSUMO
- Industry: Sugar production
- Founded: July 13, 1982; 44 years ago in Gihofi, Burundi
- Headquarters: Gihofi, Rutana Province, Burundi
- Key people: Pascal Ngendakuriyo, Chairperson; Marie Rose Bahimbare, CEO
- Products: Sugar
- Headquarters (Burundi)
- Website: www.sosumo-burundi.com

SOSUMO (Société Sucrière du Moso) is a company that grows and refines sugar in Burundi.

== Location ==
The company operates in the Rutana Province in the southeast of Burundi. This is in the Moso natural region of Burundi. The area is fed by the Muyovozi River, Mutsindozi River and Maragarazi River on the border with Tanzania. The complex is fed by the Mutsindozi River.

== Creation ==
The third five-year plan for economic and social development of Burundi, issued in the early 1970s, included the Moso sugar project to improve the economy of the southeast region. The project would also save foreign currency by avoiding the need to import sugar.

The Moso Sugar Company (SOSUMO) was created on 13 July 1982 as a Private Law Mixed Economy Company (SARL). The State of Burundi held 21,250 shares, and 100 shares each were held by the Brasseries et Limonaderies du Burundi (BRARUDI) and the Société Burundaise de Financement (SBF).

SOSUMO was given a 5,800 hectares (14,000 acres) concession, about half of which was in marshy areas. Construction of the SOSUMO complex was assigned to the Netherlands company HVA in 1986. The civil engineering works and factory construction were subcontracted to Krupp, a German company.

The establishment of SOSUMO led to settlement of the region. The company built a large neighborhood to house its employees, separated into blocks for different categories from directors down to middle managers, technicians and ordinary employees. Private neighborhoods were also built in what developed into an urban center with a regional hospital and an airfield, banks and other institutions. For uneducated youth, a job with SOSUMO gives hope for the future, although only some are employed, and then only for seasonal work.

== Sugar production and imports ==
Initial production in 1988 was about 4,000 tonnes. SOSUMO planted 1,149 hectares (2,840 acres) in 1988. By 2023 this had risen to 3,880 hectares (9,600 acres). It struggled to ramp up industrial activities between 1988 and 1991, and lost money. It had to face the socio-political crisis that lasted from 1993 to 2005, but managed to increase production steadily during this period.

Later SOSUMO averaged 20,000 tonnes annually, of which 5,000 tonnes were exported. In 2015 SOSUMO increased its sugar production to 23,000 tonnes. The company paid almost US$13 million to the state through taxes and duties, and saved about US$22.5 million in foreign exchange. It contributed 3% to Burundi's Gross Domestic Product (GDP).

Production and imports between 2015 and 2020 were (in tonnes):

Year	2015	2016	2017	2018	2019	2020
Production	22,997	23,656	21,940	19,535	18,574	20,434
Imports	10,517	12,757	26,267	22,985	16,648	

As of 2018 the company was only able to produce 23,000 tons of sugar per year, while the demand was for 35,000 tons, some of which had to be imported. In December 2019 SOSUMO validated a study by experts from the Institute of Agronomic Sciences of Burundi (ISABU) that recommended using new techniques and types of fertilizer to boost production. The authors noted that the existing system had been unchanged for thirty years. SOSUMO agreed to now use organic fertiliser produced by FOMI, which would reduce costs, including foreign currency costs.

As of 2021 Sosumo employed 570 contract workers and almost 3,000 seasonal workers. In September 2022 SOSUMO was undertaking work to expand its fields in Rutana and Makamba provinces by 526 hectares (1,300 acres), which would let the company expand production to 35,000 tonnes of sugar annually. In March 2023 it was decided to expropriate rice farmers in the Mukazye, Mazimero, Gatonga, Kinwa and Nyamikungu marshes of the Commune of Giharo, Rutana Province, and transfer the fields to SOSUMO to grow sugar cane. This plan was later suspended.

A report in March 2024 said the company had not been able to obtain herbicides for the previous growing season. Stocks of chemical fertilizers were low, and stocks on hand were due to expire before the next growing season.

== Factory ==
In May 2022 Emmanuel Sinzohagera, Speaker of the Senate, visited Rutana Province and met executives of SOSUMO in the Commune of Bukemba to discuss plans for expansion and modernization of their operations, which were underway to meet growing demand. In September 2022 planned growth of cane production meant the factory would also have to be expanded and equipped with modern equipment, and SOSUMO was seeking funding for this, but in the interim planned to repair the boilers after the production campaign ended in December.

SOSUMO again was forced to close in December 2023, while almost two thirds of the canes were waiting to be processed. The canes must be processed within a year or they become unusable. In April 2024 the managing director told the workers that the Indian company that was to repair the broken boiler, turbo-alternator and centrifuge had been slow to arrive, which would delay the start of the sugar production campaign.

== Distribution ==
At a meeting on 7 August 2023 the general Manager of SOSUMO noted that there was generally no shortage of sugar from September to February, but in the months before and just after the harvest there were shortages. During this time Sosumo had to import sugar and sell it at a loss, since its sale price was the same as locally produced sugar.

Sosumo transports sugar to warehouses in Gihofi, Ruvumera market in Bujumbura, Ngozi and Gitega. Each province obtains supplies of sugar from one of these warehouses under quotas that are meant to be based on population and available supply. The provincial administration divides their allocation between the wholsalers. Some sugar is sold at wholesale prices to ministries, banks and charitable associations. Processing factories set up under the youth entrepreneurship policy were receiving large quantities of sugar meant for retail when they should be using imported sugar.

Wholesalers complained that it was not possible to earn a profit when accounting for loading, transport and unloading costs. The general manager said the wholesale price per kilo was 3,190 BIF and the retail price was 3,300 BIF. It should be possible to earn a reasonable profit. He also said the provincial governors gave Sosumo lists of wholesale traders, and that they should punish traders who speculated on the price of sugar.

On 31 August 2023 Evariste Ndayishimiye, President of Burundi, met with wholesale sugar traders who distributed sugar from SOSUMO and called on them to stop speculating in sugar. He recommended that SOSUMO monitor the amounts delivered to wholesalers and then through distributors to retailers, and punish any unauthorized trading. Only 570 of the 817 wholesalers recognized by Sosumo attended the meeting. The president removed wholesalers who did not attend from the list of authorized SOSUMO wholesalers unless they were sick.

== Ownership ==
Sosumo reported to the Ministry of Trade until October 2020, then to the Ministry of Agriculture.

A government decree of September 2016 established a steering committee to audit and revitalize SOSUMO. The company did not have the capital needed to rehabilitate its equipment and agricultural machinery, or to expand its factory and sugar cane plantations. In November 2018 the Burundian parliament therefore voted by 100 to 1 to change the management structure and let private investors acquire 53.68% of the share capital for US$20 million. The government would retain the right to set the price of sugar.

On 29 December 2023 the Burundian head of state said he had visited the Sarrai Group in Uganda, which he described as a very efficient company. He had invited them to become partners with SOSUMO, and claimed that production would rise to 300,000 tons per year after three years of production, with a workforce of 12,000. Burundi would supply the sugar cane plantations and the Sarrai Group would supply the other capital. This announcement came at a time when the sugar cane plantations were flooded and could not be accessed by cane transport vehicles.

On 4 April 2024 the managing director of SOSUMO told workers that the date of 18 April for the start of the Sarrai Group partnership given by the Ministry of Commerce was incorrect, since they were still at the stage of assessing the assets of SOSUMO and negotiating terms of partnership.

== See also ==
- List of companies of Burundi
- Economy of Burundi

== Sources ==
- Décret n°100/198 du 21 septembre 2016 portant création, missions, composition, organisation et fonctionnement du Comité de pilotage de la redynamisation de la Sosumo (in French), FAO
- Gahimbare, Grace Divine (21 August 2023), "Sosumo : La commercialisation du sucre", Le Renouveau (in French)
- Gakiza, Dorine (5 December 2019), "SOSUMO : bientôt, des changements dans la culture de la canne à sucre", Burundi Forum (in French)
- Hicintuka, Jean-Marie (20 November 2018), Les députés votent pour un nouveau mode de gestion de la SOSUMO (in French), Agence Burundaise de Presse
- Hakizimana, Placide (9 September 2022), Rutana: Vers la modernisation et l'agrandissement de l'usine Sosumo (in French), Radio Télévision Nationale du Burundi
- Iriho, Clovis (2021), "Le travail ouvrier au Burundi : identité et conditions socio-économiques des ouvriers de l'usine sucrière de la SOSUMO", Les Cahiers d'Afrique de l'Est (in French), 56, doi:10.4000/eastafrica.1535
- Kaneza, Maureen (19 April 2021), "La Sosumo : possible de porter la production annuelle à 85 mille tonnes ?", Yaga Burundi (in French)
- "La SOSUMO a versé au trésor public près de 13 Millions USD en 2015", AGnews (in French), 25 January 2016
- "La SOSUMO bat de l'aile : la campagne de production du sucre s'arrête net suite à l'incapacité technique d'usinage", BurundiDaily, 5 December 2023
- "La SOSUMO, tous les indicateurs au rouge", Radio Publique Africaine (in French), 25 March 2024
- Ngendakuriyo, Bertrand (18 October 2023), "Les rizières du marais de Mukazye en province Rutana menacées de sécher", Radio Inzamba (in French)
- Niyongabo, Jean Marie Vianney (8 January 2024), "Vers un partenariat de la SOSUMO avec la société Sarrai Group", Burundi Eco (in French)
- Presentation de la SOSUMO (in French), SOSUMO
- Sabumukama, Eric (31 August 2023), "Gitega: Retraite des commerçants grossistes du sucre de la Sosumo avec le chef de l'Etat", Le Renouveau (in French)
- "Société Sucrière du Moso", Biodiversité du Burundi (in French)
- "SOSUMO & SARRAI Group, mariage reporté", Radio Publique Africaine (in French), 18 April 2024
- SOSUMO authorities called on to modernize this company, Senate of Burundi, 25 May 2022
