= Nyakijanda River =

- Location within Burundi
- Native name: Rivière Nyakijanda (French)

Location
- Country: Burundi
- Provinces: Gitega, Ruyigi, Rutana

Physical characteristics
- Source: Bukirasazi
  - location: Gitega Province
  - coordinates: 3°41′51″S 29°58′8″E
  - elevation: 1,807 m (5,928 ft)
- Mouth: Nyabaha River
  - location: Ruyigi Province
  - coordinates: 3°25′28″S 30°04′45″E
  - elevation: 1,437 m (4,715 ft)
- Length: 50.2 km (31.2 mi)
- Basin size: 556.4 km^{2} (214.8 sq mi)
- Discharge
  - location: Mouth
  - average: 4.95 m^{3} (174.7 cu ft)
  - minimum: 1.39 m^{3} (49.02 cu ft)
  - maximum: 11.24 m^{3} (396.8 cu ft)

Basin features
- Progression: Nyabaha → Ruvubu → Kagera → Lake Victoria → White Nile → Nile → Mediterranean Sea
- Population: 148,489 (2016)

The Nyakijanda River (French: Rivière Nyakijanda) is a river in Burundi, a left tributary of the Nyabaha River.

== Course ==
The Nyakijanda River forms in the south of Ruyigi Province where it is fed by the Gihehe River and the Gisuma River. It flows north along the boundary between Gitega Province and Ruyigi Province and joins the Sanzu River, which flows from the east, to form the Nyabaha River.

== Environment ==
The surroundings of Nyakijanda are a mosaic of agricultural land and natural vegetation. The area is quite densely populated, with 111 inhabitants per square kilometer as of 2016. The average annual temperature in the area is 19 °C (66 °F). The warmest month is September, when the average temperature is 22 °C (72 °F), and the coldest is April, with 18 °C (64 °F). Average annual rainfall is 1,321 millimetres (52.0 in). The rainiest month is December, with an average of 215 millimetres (8.5 in) of precipitation, and the driest is July, with 1 millimetre (0.039 in) of precipitation.

== Agriculture ==
The Nyakijanda marsh is in the Commune of Itaba, southeast Gitega Province, between the Kirimo natural region to the west and the Buyogoma natural region to the east. Only the Nyakijanda marsh can be managed for agricultural purposes, growing rice or other crops. Almost all the commune's watercourses converge on the marshes of the Nyakijanda.

== Hydroelectricity ==
The falls on the Nyakijanda River have hydroelectric potential. As of 1984 a 250kW hydroelectric plant had been proposed on the Nyakijanda River about 3 km from Buhoro. A 2012 report by the Ministry of Energy and Mines identified two possible projects on the Nyakijanda: NYKI 012 at 2.8MW and NYKI 002 at 1.7MW A 2022 report identified a potential site on the Nyakijanda in the Nyamuyaga colline of the Commune of Butaganzwa, Ruyigi Province. The fall was 23 metres (75 ft) high with flow of 2.7 cubic metres per second (95 cu ft/s), giving potential of 487kW.

== See also ==
- List of rivers of Burundi

== Sources ==
- Center For International Earth Science Information Network-CIESIN-Columbia University (2016), Gridded Population of the World, Version 4 (GPWv4): Population Count, Palisades, NY: NASA Socioeconomic Data and Applications Center (SEDAC), doi:10.7927/H4X63JVC
- Energy Sector Management Assistance Program Activity Completion Report (in French), UNDP/World Bank, May 1985
- Investment opportunities in renewable energy Burundi (PDF), Minister for Energy and Mines, October 2012, p. 14
- Le projet de developpement communautaire pour l’amelioration des conditions de vie dans les regions affectees par les conflits dans la province de Gitega en Republique du Burundi (PDF) (in French), Ministere de l’agriculture et de l’elevage, March 2014
- Linke, Simon; Lehner, Bernhard; Ouellet Dallaire, Camille; Ariwi, Joseph; Grill, Günther; Anand, Mira; Beames, Penny; Burchard-Levine, Vicente; Maxwell, Sally; Moidu, Hana; Tan, Florence; Thieme, Michele (2019-12-09), "Global hydro-environmental sub-basin and river reach characteristics at high spatial resolution", Scientific Data, 6 (1), doi:10.1038/s41597-019-0300-6, ISSN 2052-4463, PMC 6901482, PMID 31819059
- NASA Earth Observations: Population Density, NASA/SEDAC, archived from the original on 9 February 2016
- NASA Earth Observations Data Set Index, NASA, archived from the original on 28 November 2017
- NASA Earth Observations: Rainfall (1 month - TRMM), NASA/Tropical Rainfall Monitoring Mission, archived from the original on 19 April 2019
- NASA Earth Observations: Land Cover Classification, NASA/MODIS, archived from the original on 28 February 2016
- Province de Gitega, Commune Itaba, plan communal de developpement communautaire, deuxieme generation (PDF) (in French), Itaba: Ministère de l’Intérieur, September 2013
- Rapport Annuel (PDF) (in French), AREEN, 2022
- Ruyigi (PDF), United States Government Defense Mapping Agency, 1994
