= Rugusye River =

River in Burundi

- Location within Burundi
- Native name: Rivière Rugusye (French)

Location
- Country: Burundi

Physical characteristics
- Mouth: Rumpungwe River
  - coordinates: 3.559648°S 30.452009°E

The Rugusye River (Note: The name is also spelled Lugusi, Ruguziye, Lugusye, Luvusi) (French: Rivière Rugusye) is a river that defines part of the border between Burundi and Tanzania.

== Course ==
The Rugusye River forms to the east of Kabuyenge, in the extreme east of Ruyigi Province, Burundi. It flows in a west-southwest direction along the border between Burundi and Tanzania to its confluence with the Rumpungwe River, which continues along the border. (Note: The border between Tanganyika Territory and the Belgian mandated territory of Ruanda-Urundi in this area was defined in 1926 as "The thalweg of the Kumbizi River (Katungura) downstream to its confluence with the Lugusi River; the thalweg of the Lugusi River upstream to the confluence of the Kabuyenge River; the thalweg of the Kabuyenge River upstream to marker No. XXIV, located at the source of its western arm (also called Mushagasha).)

== Environment ==
The surroundings of Rugusye are mainly savannah forest. The area is quite sparsely populated, with 32 inhabitants per square kilometer as of 2016. The average annual temperature in the area is 22 °C (72 °F). The warmest month is September, when the average temperature is 25 °C (77 °F), and the coldest is December, with 20 °C (68 °F). Average annual rainfall is 1,376 millimetres (54.2 in). The wettest month is March, with an average of 293 millimetres (11.5 in) of precipitation, and the driest is July, with 1 millimetre (0.039 in) of precipitation.

== Watershed ==
The watershed covers 1,522 hectares (3,760 acres), of which 241 hectares (600 acres), or 15.85%, were cultivated as of 2000. Parts of the marshes of the Rugusye, the Rumpungwe and the Malagarazi are the only mineral marshes (Note: Mineral marshes: marshes where the percentage of organic matter is less than 20%.) in Burundi that are permanently flooded. Two development projects were underway in 2000 led by SOSUMO (Burundi Sugar Company) and the Ruyigi DPAE (Provincial Directorate of Agriculture and Livestock). These involved creating irrigation and drainage networks separated by dikes or tracks.

== See also ==
- List of rivers of Burundi

== Sources ==
- NASA Earth Observations: Population Density, NASA/SEDAC, archived from the original on 9 February 2016
- NASA Earth Observations Data Set Index, NASA, archived from the original on 28 November 2017 Temperature data from satellite measurements of the earth's surface temperature within a box that is.
- NASA Earth Observations: Rainfall (1 month - TRMM), NASA/Tropical Rainfall Monitoring Mission, archived from the original on 19 April 2019 Average value for the years 2012–2014 within a box that is 0.1 x 0.1 degrees.
- NASA Earth Observations: Land Cover Classification, NASA/MODIS, archived from the original on 28 February 2016
- Schema directeur d’amenagement et de mise en valeur des marais (PDF) (in French), Bujumbura: FAO, September 2000
- Treaty Series (PDF) (in French), vol. LIV, League of Nations, 1927
- "Way: Rugusye (773900265)", OpenStreetMap
