= Mutsindozi River =

River in Burundi

- Location within Burundi
- Native name: Rivière Mutsindozi (French)

Location
- Country: Burundi
- Province: Bubanza Province

Physical characteristics
- Mouth: Malagarasi River
  - coordinates: 4.070364°S 30.182984°E

The Mutsindozi River (French: Rivière Mutsindozi) is a river in southeastern Burundi, a tributary of the Malagarasi River.

== Course ==
The Mutsindozi River forms to the north of Muyaga on the border between Makamba Province to the south and Rutana Province to the north. It flows east, defining this border, to its junction with the Malagarasi River on the border between Burundi and Tanzania. The river is in the Mosso-Malagarazi depression, which has forest galleries in wooded fringes along the watercourses.

== Environment ==
The surroundings of the Mutsindozi River are mainly savannah forest. The area is quite densely populated, with 80 inhabitants per square kilometer as of 2016. The average annual temperature in the area is 21 °C (70 °F). The warmest month is August, when the average temperature is 25 °C (77 °F), and the coldest is April, with 18 °C (64 °F). Average annual rainfall is 1,419 millimetres (55.9 in). The wettest month is March, with an average of 267 millimetres (10.5 in) of precipitation, and the driest is July, with 1 millimetre (0.039 in) of precipitation.

== Marshes ==
The Mutsindozi-Malagarazi marsh subsystem is formed by two branches of the Mutsindozi River, flowing into the Malagarazi River. The first branch is that of the Kirombwe River which crosses a large papyrus grove in its lower course at the level of 1,171 metres (3,842 ft) before flowing into the Malagarazi River. The marshes include the Kirombwe Marsh, Kumutongotongo Marsh and Rwabira Marsh.

The Kayogoro Marshes are in the valley of the Buga Colline between the Kirombwe River, a tributary of the Mutsindozi, and the Malagarazi. The water of these rivers rises in the rainy season after October and floods the whole valley. When the water recedes in May, crops of rice, sweet potatoes, corn, peanuts, beans, onions and vegetables are grown in the marsh.

== Sugar ==
The Mutsindozi River supplies water to the Moso sugar project in Rutana Province, which was included in Burundi's third five-year economic and social development plan in the early 1970s, but began construction in 1986. It is run by the Moso Sugar Company (SOSUMO), founded in 1982. The project is in the Moso natural region.

== See also ==
- List of rivers of Burundi

== Sources ==
- NASA Earth Observations: Population Density, NASA/SEDAC, archived from the original on 9 February 2016
- NASA Earth Observations Data Set Index, NASA, archived from the original on 28 November 2017
- NASA Earth Observations: Rainfall (1 month - TRMM), NASA/Tropical Rainfall Monitoring Mission, archived from the original on 19 April 2019
- NASA Earth Observations: Land Cover Classification, NASA/MODIS, archived from the original on 28 February 2016
- Nzigidahera, Benoît; Njebarikanuye, Aline; Kakunze, Alain Charles; Misigago, Apollinaire (September 2008), Etude préliminaire d’identification des milieux naturels mettre en défens dans la dépression de Kumoso (PDF) (in French), Gitega: INECN
- Presentation de la SOSUMO (in French), SOSUMO
- Ramsar Site no. 2150 (PDF) (in French), Ramsar, 14 March 2013
- "Way: Mutsindozi (1000011706)", OpenStreetMap
