= Mwiruzi River =

River in Burundi

- Location within Burundi
- Native name: Rivière Mukazye (French)

Location
- Country: Burundi
- Province: Bubanza Province

Physical characteristics
- Mouth: Malagarasi River
  - location: Tanzanian border
  - coordinates: 2.97992°S 30.84959°E

The Mwiruzi River (Note: The Mwiruzi is also called the Mwiluzi or Mwelushi) (French: Rivière Mwiruzi) is a river in northeastern Burundi, a tributary of the Malagarasi River.

== Course ==
The Mwiruzi River is in the Malagarasi River watershed. In Burundi, the Mwiruzi River flows through the Commune of Mishiha in the northeast of Cankuzo Province, marking the northeast border between Burundi and Tanzania. Its source is the quartzitic ridge of Gitwenge, where its tributaries the Mungwa and the Gahumo also take their source. The Gahumo flows along the northern border between Cankuzo and Tanzania to join the Mwiruzi.

== Marshes ==
A report prepared in 2000 for the FAO recommended resettling displaced persons in the 800 hectares (2,000 acres) Mwiruzi marshes in the province of Cankuzo. The demographic pressure in this area was low, and the marsh was mineral, so there should be no major problem in development.

The marshes in the watershed of the Mwiruzi River cover 4,216 hectares (10,420 acres), of which 1,748 hectares (4,320 acres) or 41% were cultivated in 2014. As of 2014 the 185 hectares (460 acres) Nyanzari-Mwiruzi marsh and the 50 hectares (120 acres) Mwiruzi marsh, both in the Mishiha commune, were both managed. A 70 hectares (170 acres) Mwiruzi marsh was not managed.

== See also ==
- List of rivers of Burundi

== Sources ==
- Emerusenge, Emile (September 2011), Etude d’impact environnemental et social des sous-projets du troisiemer portefeuille du projet de travaux publics et de gestion urbaine, Bujumbura: Ministere des transports, des travaux publics et de l’equipement
- Schema directeur d’amenagement et de mise en valeur des marais (PDF) (in French), Bujumbura: FAO, September 2000
- Stratégie Agricole Nationale 2008–2015 (PDF), Bujumbura: Ministere de l’agriculture et de l’elevage, July 2008
- Strategie nationale de developpement de la filiere riz au Burundi (PDF) (in French), Bujumbura: Ministere de l’agriculture et de l’elevage, 2014
- "Way: Gahumo (299682926)", OpenStreetMap
