= Nyabaha River =

River in Burundi

- Location within Burundi
- Native name: Rivière Nyabaha (French)

Location
- Country: Burundi
- Provinces: Rutana Gitega, Ruyigi

Physical characteristics
- Source: Sanzu
  - location: Ruyigi Province
  - coordinates: 3°19′2″S 30°23′32″E
  - elevation: 1,842 m (6,043 ft)
- Mouth: Rurubu River
  - location: Intersection of Gitega, Ruyigi, and Karuzi provinces
  - coordinates: 3°22′18″S 30°02′30″E
  - elevation: 1,386 m (4,547 ft)
- Length: 61.7 km (38.3 mi)
- Basin size: 934.4 km^{2} (360.8 sq mi)
- Discharge
  - location: Mouth
  - average: 8.18 m^{3} (288.7 cu ft)
  - minimum: 2.27 m^{3} (80.23 cu ft)
  - maximum: 18.83 m^{3} (664.9 cu ft)

Basin features
- Progression: Ruvubu → Kagera → Lake Victoria → White Nile → Nile → Mediterranean Sea
- Population: 231,552 {2016)
- Tributaries
  - left: Nyakijanda
  - right: Sanzu

The Nyabaha River (French: Rivière Nyabaha) is a river in Burundi, a right tributary of the Rurubu River.

== Course ==
The Nyabaha River is one of the main tributaries of the Rurubu River. It forms in Ruyigi Province where Nyakijanda River from the south joins the Sanzu River from the east. It flows in a northwest direction along the boundary between Gitega Province to the west and Ruyigi Province to the east to join the Ruvubu River. Its upper reaches run between the settlements of Mubira in Ruyigi Province and Mubuga in Gitega Province. It joins the Ruvubu just upstream of the Ruvubu National Park.

== Environment ==
The surroundings of Nyabaha are a mosaic of agricultural land and natural vegetation. The area is densely populated, with 397 inhabitants per square kilometer as of 2016. The average annual temperature in the area is 20 °C (68 °F). The warmest month is September, when the average temperature is 22 °C (72 °F), and the coldest is April, with 18 °C (64 °F). Average annual rainfall is 1,321 millimetres (52.0 in). The rainiest month is December, with an average of 215 millimetres (8.5 in) of precipitation, and the driest is July, with 1 millimetre (0.039 in) of precipitation.

== Marshes ==
The Nyabaha basin contain 2,957 hectares (7,310 acres) of marshes, of which 2,431 hectares (6,010 acres), or 82%, are exploited for agriculture.

== Hydrological station ==
A hydrological station was installed on the Nyabaha near Mubuga in May 1974 by the Hydromet Project, which did not carry out gauging. It had three scales on the left bank. The Geographic Institute of Burundi (IGEBU) began gauging in July 1982. The bridge collapsed in August 1985 and destroyed the scales. New scales were installed in September 1985 on the right bank upstream of the bridge. The station was rehabilitated in 2008. It has been moved from time to time. Gauging is now done from downstream of the bridge.

== See also ==
- List of rivers of Burundi

== Sources ==
- Annuaire Hydrologique 2021-2022 (PDF) (in French), September 2023
- Center For International Earth Science Information Network-CIESIN-Columbia University (2016), Gridded Population of the World, Version 4 (GPWv4): Population Count, Palisades, NY: NASA Socioeconomic Data and Applications Center (SEDAC), doi:10.7927/H4X63JVC
- Investment opportunities in renewable energy Burundi (PDF), Minister for Energy and Mines, October 2012, p. 14
- Linke, Simon; Lehner, Bernhard; Ouellet Dallaire, Camille; Ariwi, Joseph; Grill, Günther; Anand, Mira; Beames, Penny; Burchard-Levine, Vicente; Maxwell, Sally; Moidu, Hana; Tan, Florence; Thieme, Michele (2019-12-09), "Global hydro-environmental sub-basin and river reach characteristics at high spatial resolution", Scientific Data, 6 (1), doi:10.1038/s41597-019-0300-6, ISSN 2052-4463, PMC 6901482, PMID 31819059
- NASA Earth Observations: Population Density, NASA/SEDAC, archived from the original on 9 February 2016
- NASA Earth Observations Data Set Index, NASA, archived from the original on 28 November 2017
- NASA Earth Observations: Rainfall (1 month - TRMM), NASA/Tropical Rainfall Monitoring Mission, archived from the original on 19 April 2019
- NASA Earth Observations: Land Cover Classification, NASA/MODIS, archived from the original on 28 February 2016
- Parc National de la Ruvubu (PDF) (in French), ABUCI-SIG
- Projet de developpement local pour l’emploi (PDF) (in French), Bujumbura: Agence Burundaise pour la realisation des travaux d’interet public, November 2019
- Rapport sur la situation des droits humains au Burundi (PDF) (in French), ITEKA
- Ruyigi (PDF), United States Government Defense Mapping Agency, 1994
- Strategie Agricole Nationale 2008-2015 (PDF) (in French), Bujumbura: Ministry of Agriculture and Breeding, July 2008
- "Way: Nyabaha (124128954)", OpenStreetMap
