= Buzimba River =

River in Burundi

- Location within Burundi
- Native name: Rivière Buzimba (French)

Location
- Country: Burundi
- Province: Bubanza Province

Physical characteristics
- Mouth: Lake Tanganyika
  - coordinates: 4.06611°S 29.46576°E

The Buzimba River (French: Rivière Buzimba) is a river in Rumonge Province, Burundi, that flows into Lake Tanganyika.

== Course ==
The river rises in the southwest of Bururi Province, and in its upper course forms a short section of the boundary between Bururi Province and Rumonge Province. It flows southwest past Gatete and through a palm oil plantation to its mouth on Lake Tanganyika.

== Hippopotamus ==
In December 2023 a hippopotamus became trapped in a pit near the mouth of the Buzimba River. Burundian Office for Environmental Protection said they would rescue the animal, but in the meantime some of the farmers felt threatened by the dangerous animal, and it was at risk of being killed by poachers.

== Palm oils ==
There are many palm oil processing units along the river. Palm farmers harvest the bunches of palm fruit and bring them to the processing unit to extract the palm oil. The units use the river water for processing. The processing units are required to place waste from processing in pits, where the waste will decompose. However, most units do not have the capacity to treat waste in this way, and dump the waste into the river at night or through underground pipes. This pollutes Lake Tanganyika and reduces the fish catch.

The Buzimba seed field beside the river used to cover 45 hectares (110 acres), but 3 hectares (7.4 acres) were washed away by the river, leaving 42 hectares (100 acres). In June 2024 an article in Radio Publique Africaine reported that an association was renting the palms from the province for a nominal amount, and was sub-renting to farmers at low rates. The report implicated the Provincial Director of Agriculture and Livestock in Rumonge in the scam.

== See also ==
- List of rivers of Burundi

== Sources ==
- Nzorubonanya, Felix (11 October 2019), "Rumonge : la pollution des eaux du lac Tanganyika continue", Burundi Eco (in French)
- Nzorubonanya, Félix (28 December 2023), "Rumonge / Polémiques autour d'un hippopotame coincé dans une fosse", Iwacu
- "Relation: Buzimba (17502785)", OpenStreetMap
- "Rumonge : De la location des palmiers à huile au détournement", Radio Publique Africaine (in French), 10 June 2024
