= Sanzu River (Burundi) =

River in Burundi

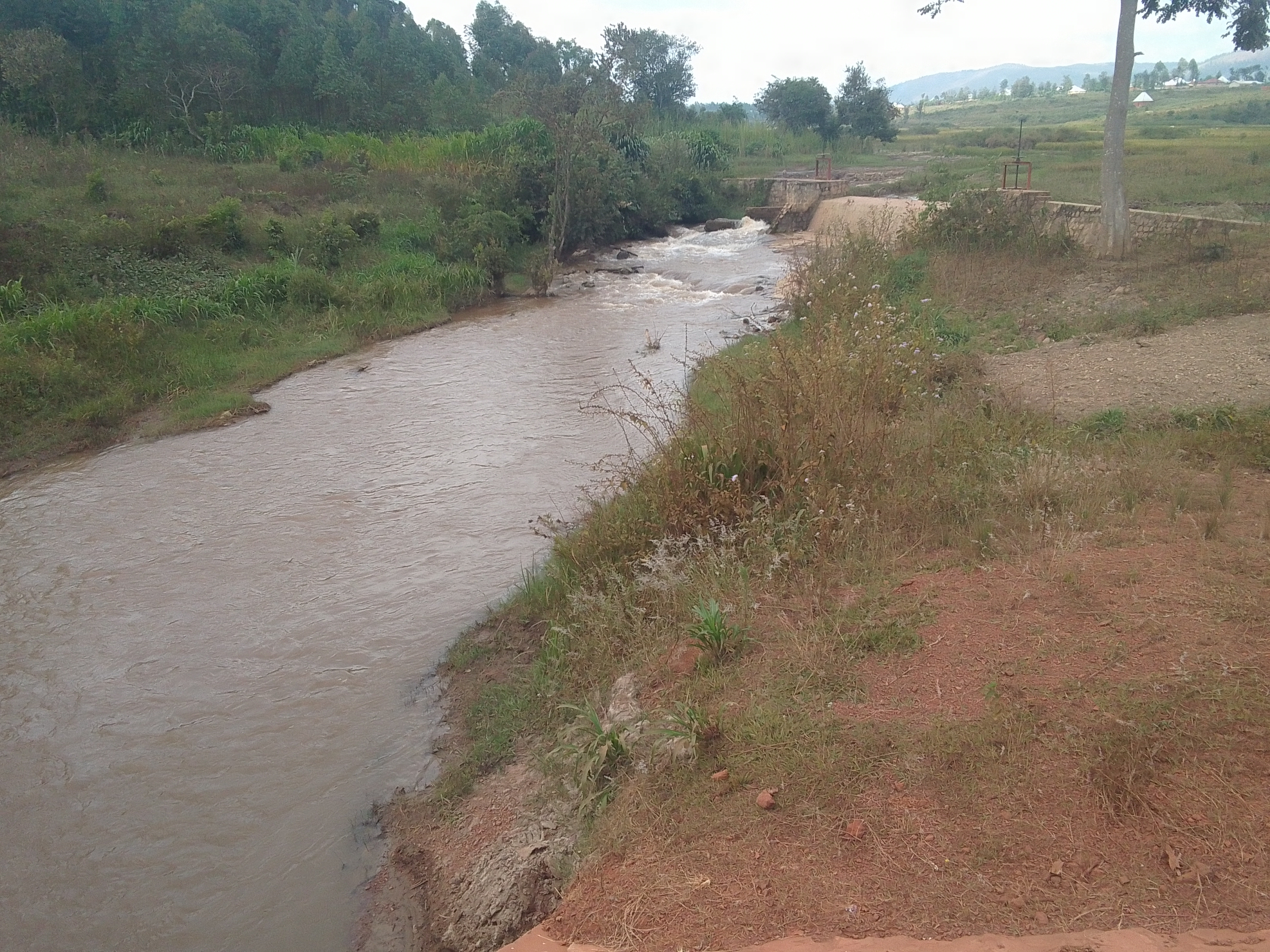

- Location within Burundi
- Native name: Rivière Sanzu (French)

Location
- Country: Burundi
- Province: Ruyigi

Physical characteristics
- Source: Rugerero Mountain
  - location: Ruyigi Province
  - coordinates: 3°19′2″S 30°23′32″E
  - elevation: 1,842 m (6,043 ft)
- Mouth: Nyabaha River
  - location: Ruyigi Province
  - coordinates: 3°25′26″S 30°04′46″E
  - elevation: 1,438 m (4,718 ft)
- Length: 54.2 km (33.7 mi)
- Basin size: 352.7 km^{2} (136.2 sq mi)
- Discharge
  - location: Mouth
  - average: 2.97 m^{3} (105.0 cu ft)
  - minimum: 0.834 m^{3} (29.45 cu ft)
  - maximum: 7.04 m^{3} (248.7 cu ft)

Basin features
- Progression: Nyabaha → Ruvubu → Kagera → Lake Victoria → White Nile → Nile → Mediterranean Sea
- Population: 74,448 (2016)
- Tributaries
  - left: Rutimbura
  - right: Rusabagi

The Sanzu River (French: Rivière Sanzu) is a river in Burundi, a right tributary of the Nyabaha River.

== Course ==
The Sanzu River forms in the east of Ruyigi Province to the southwest of Kigamba and northwest of the city of Ruyigi. It is formed where the Rusabagi River from the northwest joins the Rutimbura River from the southeast. It flows west to join the Nyakijanda River, which flows from the south. The combined stream is the Nyabaha River, which flows northwest to join the Ruvubu River. The Sanzu flows through the Commune of Ruyigi and the Commune of Butaganzwa.

== Environment ==
The surroundings of the Sanzu river are a mosaic of farmland and natural vegetation. The area is quite densely populated, with 111 inhabitants per square kilometer as of 2016. The average annual temperature in the area is 19 °C (66 °F). The warmest month is September, when the average temperature is 22 °C (72 °F), and the coldest is April, with 18 °C (64 °F). Average annual rainfall is 1,321 millimetres (52.0 in). The rainiest month is December, with an average of 215 millimetres (8.5 in) of precipitation, and the driest is July, with 1 millimetre (0.039 in) of precipitation.

== Issues ==
There is an old hydroelectric dam owned by Regideso on the Sanzu River on the Ruyigi-Kayongozi road, about 3 kilometres (1.9 mi) from Ruyigi. The power plant ceased to function in 2000, and the canal that carried water to the plant became clogged due to lack of maintenance. This has caused flooding to several rice fields along a 13 kilometres (8.1 mi) stretch. In April 2023 one of the pipes broke, causing further damage.

In May 2023 torrential rain caused the flooding of marshes beside the Sanzu River in Ruhwago colline, Commune of Ruyigi. Beans, corn, potatoes, sweet potatoes and other crops were washed away about three weeks before they were to be harvested.

== See also ==
- List of rivers of Burundi

== Sources ==
- Center For International Earth Science Information Network-CIESIN-Columbia University (2016), Gridded Population of the World, Version 4 (GPWv4): Population Count, Palisades, NY: NASA Socioeconomic Data and Applications Center (SEDAC), doi:10.7927/H4X63JVC
- Investment opportunities in renewable energy Burundi (PDF), Minister for Energy and Mines, October 2012, p. 14
- Linke, Simon; Lehner, Bernhard; Ouellet Dallaire, Camille; Ariwi, Joseph; Grill, Günther; Anand, Mira; Beames, Penny; Burchard-Levine, Vicente; Maxwell, Sally; Moidu, Hana; Tan, Florence; Thieme, Michele (2019-12-09), "Global hydro-environmental sub-basin and river reach characteristics at high spatial resolution", Scientific Data, 6 (1), doi:10.1038/s41597-019-0300-6, ISSN 2052-4463, PMC 6901482, PMID 31819059
- NASA Earth Observations: Population Density, NASA/SEDAC, archived from the original on 9 February 2016
- NASA Earth Observations Data Set Index, NASA, archived from the original on 28 November 2017 Temperature data from satellite measurements of the earth's surface temperature within a box that is 0.1×0.1 degres.
- NASA Earth Observations: Rainfall (1 month - TRMM), NASA/Tropical Rainfall Monitoring Mission, archived from the original on 19 April 2019 Average value for the years 2012–2014 within a box that is 0.1×0.1 degres.
- NASA Earth Observations: Land Cover Classification, NASA/MODIS, archived from the original on 28 February 2016
- "Plusieurs champs de riz détruits par un barrage de la Regideso, hors service", Agence Burundaise de Presse (in French), 12 April 2023
- Projet de rehabilitation de la route Makebuko – Ruyigi (RN13) – Phase 1 / Troncon Makebuko – Butanganzwa (PDF) (in French), African Development Bank Group
- Ruyigi (PDF), United States Government Defense Mapping Agency, 1994
- "Ruyigi : les pluies torrentielles font des dégâts", Iwacu (in French), 5 May 2013
