= Commune of Cendajuru =

- Commune
- Location within Burundi
- Coordinates: 3°18′19″S 30°35′24″E
- Country: Burundi
- Province: Cankuzo Province
- Administrative center: Cendajuru
- Time zone: UTC+2 (Central Africa Time)

The commune of Cendajuru is a commune of Cankuzo Province in north-eastern Burundi.

== Geography ==
The commune is in the south of Cankuzo Province. The area of the commune is 183.6 square kilometres (70.9 sq mi). It contains three zones and 17 collines:

CENDAJURU	Cendajuru, Kabageni, Kibande, Kigarika, Kiruhura, Kiyange, Mugongo
NYAMUGARI	Busyana, Gashirwe, Gitaramuka, Nyamugari, Rukoyoyo
TWINKWAVU	Gisoro, Misugi, Nyagisovu, Nyakuguma, Twinkwavu

The commune is irrigated by the Ruru and Rumpungwe rivers. The part in the Buyogoma natural region has a plateau-type relief, while the part in the Moso natural region has flat or slightly undulating terrain.

== Population ==
The population as of 2008 was 32,458.

== Events ==
In May 2022 hippopotamus along the Rumpungwe River in the Commune of Cendajuru were destroying rice, cassava and bean crops and terrorizing the local population.

== Sources ==
- "Cendajuru, Commune in Burundi", citypopulation.de
- Monographie de la Commune Cendajuru (PDF) (in French), Ministere de la planification du developpement et de la reconstruction nationale, September 2006
- Mugisha, Hervé (19 May 2022), "Gisuru: des hippopotames sèment le chaos", Iwacu (in French)
