= Mpanda River =

River in Burundi

- Location within Burundi
- Native name: Rivière Mpanda (French)

Location
- Country: Burundi
- Province: Bubanza Province

Physical characteristics
- Mouth: Ruzizi River
  - coordinates: 3.313783°S 29.276974°E

The Mpanda River (French: Rivière Mpanda) is a river in Bubanza Province, Burundi. It is a tributary of the Ruzizi River.

== Course ==
The Mpanda River and the Kajeke River are the only permanent tributaries of the Rusizi in its lower plain. The Mpanda rises near the crest of the Zaire-Nile ridge, and flows across the plain for about 30 kilometres (19 mi). About 10 kilometres (6.2 mi) from the Rusizi it crosses an enormous expanse of marshes that connect to the Mutimbuzi River basin.

The Mpanda rises in the Kibira National Park on the border between Muramvya Province and Bubanza Province. It flows west and then south-southwest through Bubanza Province past the towns of Mpanda and Murengeza, then flows southwest along the boundary between Bubanza Province and Bujumbura Rural Province. It defines the north end of the Melchior Ndadaye International Airport, then joins the Ruzizi River just north of its mouth on Lake Tanganyika.

The Mpanda is up to 5 to 6 metres (16 to 20 ft) wide and 2 metres (6 ft 7 in) deep. In dry periods the flow may be only 2 cubic metres per second (71 cu ft/s), but it can become a torrent in flood periods.

== Issues ==
In October 2020 the standpipes in Rukaramu, Commune of Mutimbuzi, Bujumbura Rural Province, had been dry for over six months. The inhabitants were forced to use water from the Mpanda River. In November 2020 the river banks collapsed and Mpanda River left its bed near Rukaramu.

In March 2021 the Gatura irrigation dam on the Mpanda River gave way, causing a risk that over 3,125 hectares (7,720 acres) of rice fields in the communes of Mpanda and Gihanga would dry up. A possible solution was to divert the nearby Nyaburiga River into the dam's canal. In May 2021 the river threatened to break the dam that protects the infrastructure of the Melchior Ndadaye International Airport.

== Hydroelectricity ==
Work began on a hydroelectric dam on the Mpanda River in 2011, with an estimated cost of US$54 million. The contractors included the Chinese company CENEMA-CGC for the power plant buildings and equipment, and Angelique International for the connection station and distribution line. Work stopped in 2017 after 45% had been completed, since the contractors had not been paid for the remaining work. In October 2021 Evariste Ndayishimiye, President of Burundi, visited the site, where he found that some of the structures had already collapsed.

In June 2021 the French company Hydroneo East Africa received a $1 million development loan from the British government's Renewable Energy Performance Platform (REPP) for implementation of a 10.2MW run-of-river hydroelectric project on the rapids of the Mpanda River. The project needed $43.5 million in total, and Hydroneo expected to complete financing in 2022. In June 2023 Hydroneo East Africa invited separate tenders for construction of the Mpanda Hydroelectric Power Station and for the 27 kilometres (17 mi) power transmission line from the plant and the Rubirizi substation.

== Sources ==
- Dushime, Cressia (28 October 2020), "Fait du jour/Rivière Mpanda: source de vie pour les habitants de Rukaramu", Iwacu
- Isenge, Baudouin (3 May 2021), "Visite de terrain sur la digue protégeant les infrastructures de l'Aéroport International Melchior NDANDAYE.", Ministry of Finance (in French)
- Mpawenayo, Balthazar (1996), Les eaux de la plaine de la Rusizi (Burundi) (PDF) (in French), Académie Royale des Sciences d'Outre-Mer, ISBN 90-75652-01-1
- Niyungeko, Dorine (20 November 2020), "La rivière Mpanda menace la zone Rukaramu", Iwacu (in French)
- Nyandwi, Dieudonné (3 April 2021b), Bubanza: la déviation de la rivière Gatura, un acte de sauvetage pour un grand périmètre rizicole (in French)
- Nyandwi, Dieudonné (15 October 2021), "Vers la reprise des travaux de construction du barrage Mpanda", Radio Télévision Nationale du Burundi (in French)
- "Relation: Mpanda (2689931)", OpenStreetMap
- Takouleu, Jean Marie (16 June 2021), BURUNDI : le projet hydroélectrique de Mpanda enregistre un financement de la REPP (in French), Afrik 21
- Takouleu, Jean Marie (2 June 2023), BURUNDI : un appel d’offres pour la centrale hydroélectrique de Mpanda (10 MW) (in French), Afrik 21
