= Muyaga =

Muyaga may refer to:

- Muyaga, Burundi, a village in Makamba Province, Burundi
- Rwandan Revolution, also known by the Kinyarwanda name Muyaga
