= Muyovozi River =

River in Burundi

- Location within Burundi
- Native name: Rivière Muyovozi (French)

Location
- Country: Burundi
- Province: Bubanza Province

Physical characteristics
- Mouth: Malagarasi River
  - coordinates: 3.9904°S 30.2136°E

The Muyovozi River (French: Rivière Muyovozi) is a river in southeastern Burundi, a tributary of the Malagarasi River.

== Course ==
The Muyovozi River is in the Mosso-Malagarazi depression, which has forest galleries in wooded fringes along the watercourses.

The Muyovozi forms in the northwest of Rutana Province and flows south along the RN8 highway, then southeast or south-southeast where it is joined by the Musasa River to the northeast of Bukemba. (Note: As of August 2024 OpenStreetMap showed the Muyovozi as a tributary of the Musasa, rather than the other way around. This is incorrect. The Musasa River is a right bank affluent of the Muyovozi River. The Muyovozi is a major tributary of the Malagarasi River.) The Muyovozi continues east to join the Malagarasi River.

== Falls ==
The Nyaganza Falls are on the Muyovozi River. The Cikinga Falls are on Musasa River, a right bank affluent of the Muyovozi River. The Karera Falls are on the Karera River, a left bank affluent of the Muyovozi River.

== Sugar ==
The Muyovozi River swamp has been heavily exploited, and contains several sugar cane plantations. The Muyovozi River supplies water to the Moso sugar project in Rutana Province, which was included in Burundi's third five-year economic and social development plan in the early 1970s, but began construction in 1986. It is run by the Moso Sugar Company (SOSUMO SM), founded in 1982. The project is in the Moso natural region.

== Marshes ==
The Muyovozi-Malagarazi marsh subcomplex starts near Nyabihori (Rwabira) at 1,662 metres (5,453 ft) elevation, 3.9922°S 030.2030°E, and reaches downstream along the Malagarazi to the level of the Muvumu colline at 1,157 metres (3,796 ft) elevation, 3.8775°S 30.2655°E. The Muyovozi River was diverted at Rusabagi at 1,160 metres (3,810 ft) elevation, 3.9911°S 30.1159°E, which created a large pond dominated by Cyperus papyrus. The Muyovozi River and the Kinwa River meet at 3.9605°S 30.2050°E and form a large channel that flows towards the Malagarazi through a huge papyrus grove. These channels are used to irrigate rice fields.

== Protection ==
The upper Malagarazi – Muyovozi system has been protected as a Ramsar site since 2000. The Malagarazi Nature Reserve largely corresponds to the Muyovozi Marshland complex. The Réserve Naturelle de la Malagarazi covers 800 hectares (2,000 acres), with a permanent freshwater river that is surrounded by marshes. The reserve is the Burundian part of the Tanzanian Malagarasi-Muyovozi Wetlands Ramsar Site.

The reserve is an important breeding ground for endemic fishes of the Congo basin and the Sudano-Zambezian ecoregion. It is host to several bird species including the endangered grey crowned crane, Hadada Ibis and Cape wagtail. It is also home to hippopotamus, which are on the IUCN Red List. It contains a range of types of vegetation including woodlands, gallery forests, savannas and marshes. It is threatened by slash and burn agriculture, deforestation, siltation, the use of toxic chemicals in fishing, and waste water discharges from the nearby sugar-producing industry.

A 2024 study of fish in the Upper Malagarazi Basin in Burundi proposed creation of a Muyovozi Nature Reserve to protect the upper stretches of the river, and the endemic fish species in this stretch. The proposed reserve would cover the headwaters of the river, and the main river down to and around the Nyaganza Falls.

== See also ==
- List of rivers of Burundi

== Sources ==
- Bigirimana, Anatole; Kisekelwa, Tchalondawa; da Costa, Luis M.; Muzumani, Donatien R.; Mulelenu, Christian Mukweze; Abwe, Emmanuel; Banyankimbona, Gaspard; Vreven, Emmanuel (2024), "An Updated Checklist of the Fishes from the Upper Malagarazi (Lake Tanganyika Basin) in Burundi: Implications for an under Implementation Malagarazi Nature Reserve", Diversity, 16 (7: 417): 417, doi:10.3390/d16070417
- Nzigidahera, Benoît; Njebarikanuye, Aline; Kakunze, Alain Charles; Misigago, Apollinaire (September 2008), Etude préliminaire d'identification des milieux naturels mettre en défens dans la dépression de Kumoso (PDF) (in French), Gitega: INECN
- Presentation de la SOSUMO (in French), SOSUMO
- Ramsar Site no. 2150 (PDF) (in French), Ramsar, 14 March 2013
- Réserve Naturelle de la Malagarazi, Ramsar Sites Information Service, 14 March 2013
- "Way: Muyovozi (1026843408)", OpenStreetMap, February 2022
