= Commune of Rutana =

Rutana
- Commune
- Location within Burundi
- Coordinates: 3°55′S 30°00′E
- Country: Burundi
- Province: Rutana
- Administrative center: Rutana

Area
  - Total: 255.31 km^{2} (98.58 sq mi)
- Elevation: 1,820 m (5,970 ft)

Population (2008 census)
  - Total: 55,177
  - Density: 216.12/km^{2} (559.74/sq mi)
- Time zone: UTC+2 (Central Africa Time)

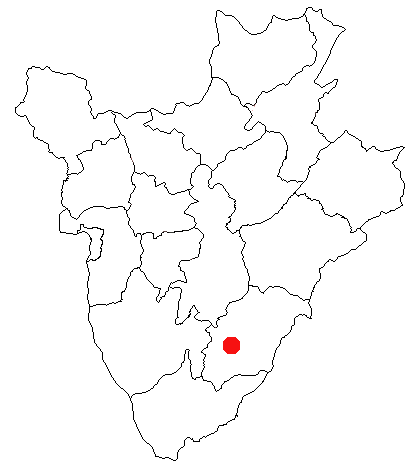
Locator map of the Commune of Rutana in Rutana Province, Burundi

Rutana is a commune of Rutana Province in southeastern Burundi. The capital lies at Rutana.
