= Kajeke River =

River in Burundi

- Location within Burundi
- Native name: Rivière Kajeke (French)

Location
- Country: Burundi
- Province: Bubanza Province

Physical characteristics
- Mouth: Ruzizi River
  - coordinates: 3.26812°S 29.24846°E

The Kajeke River (French: Rivière Kajeke) is a river in Bubanza Province, Burundi. It is a tributary of the Ruzizi River.

== Course ==
The river rises to the east of Muramba and flows south to Bubanza, running west past the north of that city. It turns southeast and flows past Gihanga to the Ruzizi River.

== Environment ==
The surroundings of Kajeke are a mosaic of farmland and natural vegetation. The area is densely populated, with 266 inhabitants per square kilometer as of 2016. Savannah climate prevails in the area. The average annual temperature in the area is 24 °C (75 °F). The warmest month is October, when the average temperature is 28 °C (82 °F), and the coldest is March, with 21 °C (70 °F). Average annual rainfall is 1,086 millimetres (42.8 in). The wettest month is December, with an average of 154 millimetres (6.1 in) of precipitation, and the driest is July, with 3 millimetres (0.12 in) of precipitation.

== Flooding ==
The Kajeke River flooded in 1982. After that a program to clean the 8 metres (26 ft) deep river bed had started, but did not last long, so the river gradually become shallower. In May 2006 torrential rains caused the Kajeke River to overflow again, resulting in damaging floods, particularly in the Commune of Gihanga. The river reached the Mpanda cemetery, where it flooded and completely destroyed many graves.

In December 2021 the President of the National Platform for Risk Prevention and Disaster Management visited the site where the Kajeke riverbed was being redeveloped in Gihanga Commune by Oxfam with European Union funding. After the bed had been redeveloped, grasses and trees would be planted to stabilize the banks. Oxfam planned to undertake a similar project on the Musasa River in Rutana Province.

In May 2022 the Kajeke River, which had been diverted from its main bed by rice farmers, flooded 118 houses in Gihanga. Traffic was disrupted on the Bujumbura–Cibitoke road, and large areas of rice fields were flooded, with the crops washed away. The Mpanda cemetery was also damaged.

== Dam ==
In 2009 Work started on construction of a hydro-agricultural dam on the Kajeke between the Kagirigiri colline of the Commune of Bubanza and the Cabara colline of the Buvyuko Zone. It was to irrigate 1,013 hectares (2,500 acres), but this was later expanded to 2,813 hectares (6,950 acres). In November 2015 Joseph Butore, Second Vice-president of Burundi, visited the dam site with the ministers of Agriculture, Good Governance and Environment. The purpose was to assess progress and learn about the cause of the slowdown.

The companies defaulted, and in March 2018 the Minister of Agriculture said the project had failed. Tenders to restart the work were drawn up in 2019, but as of 2021 work had not begun. In June 2021 Evariste Ndayishimiye, President of Burundi, visited the dam site, where he said he would establish a commission to study construction of the dam. The goal was to irrigate 3,600 hectares (8,900 acres) of rice and corn fields in the first phase, and 6,000 in the second phase.

== See also ==
- List of rivers of Burundi

== Sources ==
- Banyankiye, Pierre Claver (25 August 2021), "Barrage hydro-agricole de Kajeke : un pas en avant, deux pas en arrière ?", Yaga Burundi (in French)
- Le 2ème Vice-président de la République visite le barrage hydro-agricole sur la rivière Kajeke, Office Burundais des Recettes
- "Les débordements de la rivière Kajeke causent d'énormes dégâts en commune Gihanga", ITEKA (in French), 17 May 2006
- NASA Earth Observations: Population Density, NASA/SEDAC, archived from the original on 9 February 2016
- NASA Earth Observations Data Set Index, NASA, archived from the original on 6 August 2013 Temperature data from satellite measurements of the earth's surface temperature within a box that is 0.1x0.1 degrees.
- NASA Earth Observations: Rainfall (1 month - TRMM), NASA/Tropical Rainfall Monitoring Mission, archived from the original on 19 April 2019 Average value for the years 2012–2014 within a box that is 0.1x0.1 degrees.
- NASA Earth Observations: Land Cover Classification, NASA/MODIS, archived from the original on 28 February 2016
- Ndabashinze, Rénovat (1 June 2022), "Retro Environnement/La révolte des rivières", Iwacu (in French)
- Ntahondi, Nathan (4 June 2021), "Construction du barrage de Kajeke en Province Bubanza : Une commission bientôt en place", Le Renouveau
- Nkurunziza, Dieudonné (23 December 2021), "La rivière Kajeke bientôt rétablie dans son lit", Radio Télévision Nationale du Burundi (in French)
- "Way: Kajeke (736829572)", OpenStreetMap
