= Commune of Mpinga-Kayove =

Coordinates: 3°44′10″S 30°10′19″E

Mpinga-Kayove
- Commune
- Interactive map of Mpinga-Kayove
- Country: Burundi
- Province: Rutana
- Administrative center: Mpinga-Kayove
- Time zone: UTC+2 (Central Africa Time)

Mpinga-Kayove is a commune of Rutana Province in southeastern Burundi. The capital lies at Mpinga-Kayove.
