= Muyaga, Burundi =

Muyaga
- Village
- Location in Burundi
- Coordinates: 4.1011138°S 30.0117832°E
- Country: Burundi
- Province: Makamba Province
- Commune: Commune of Kayogoro

Population (2012)
  - Total: 26,644

Muyaga is a village in the Commune of Kayogoro, Makamba Province in southern Burundi.

Muyaga is in the east of Makamba Province, east of the town of Kayogoro, south of the headwaters of the Mutsindozi River. The Bujondi Health Center (CDS) is just north of the village. The CDS served a population of 12,535 as of 2019.

== Sources ==
- CDS Bujondi (in French), Ministry of Health
- "Node: Muyaga (6867615076)", OpenStreetMap
