= Gatete =

Gatete is a surname. Notable people with the surname include:

- Claver Gatete (born 1962), Rwandan politician
- Jean-Baptiste Gatete (born 1953), Rwandan politician
- Jimmy Gatete (born 1979), Rwandan footballer
