= Commune of Ruyigi =

- Commune
- Location within Burundi
- Coordinates: 3°28′47″S 30°13′47″E
- Country: Burundi
- Province: Ruyigi Province
- Administrative center: Ruyigi

Area
  - Total: 289.08 km^{2} (111.61 sq mi)
- Elevation: 1,844 m (6,050 ft)

Population (2008 census)
  - Total: 56,631
  - Density: 195.90/km^{2} (507.38/sq mi)
- Time zone: UTC+2 (Central Africa Time)

The commune of Ruyigi is a commune of Ruyigi Province in eastern Burundi. The capital lies at Ruyigi.
