= Commune of Kinyinya =

Coordinates: 3°39′38″S 30°20′32″E

- Commune
- Interactive map of Commune of Kinyinya
- Country: Burundi
- Province: Ruyigi Province
- Administrative center: Kinyinya
- Time zone: UTC+2 (Central Africa Time)

The commune of Kinyinya is a commune of Ruyigi Province in eastern Burundi. The capital lies at Kinyinya.
