= Rumpungwe River =

River in Burundi

- Location within Burundi
- Native name: Rivière Rumpungwe (French)

Location
- Country: Burundi

Physical characteristics
- Mouth: Malagarasi River
  - location: Kumoso
  - coordinates: 3.795235°S 30.401083°E

The Rumpungwe (Note: The name is sometimes spelled Rumpungu or Lumpungu) River (French: Rivière Rumpungwe) is a river that defines part of the border between Burundi and Tanzania.

== Course ==
The Rumpungwe River rises in Cankuzo Province and flows southeast to the Burundi–Tanzania border. There it turns to flow southwest along the Cankuzo–Tanzania border. It enters Ruyigi Province and flows through the southeast corner of that province, then returns to follow the southern Ruyigi–Tanzania border.

A short distance along the border between Rutana Province and Tanzania the Rumpungwe joins the Malagarasi River, which enters Tanzania and flows southeast. The Malagarasi River rises less than 20 kilometres (12 mi) from Lake Tanganyika and flows northeast along the Burundi-Tanzania border to its junction with the Rumpungwe.

The Rumpungwe River collects the waters of the northern part of the Moso depression, while the Malagarazi River collects the waters of the southern part. The river irrigates part of the Commune of Kinyinya in the south of Ruyigi Province.

== Events ==
In November 2016 Christian Joly represented the European Union at the inauguration of a Bailey bridge carrying the RN11 highway over the Rumpungwe River in the Commune of Kinyinya, Ruyigi Province.

In May 2022 hippopotamus along the Rumpungwe River in the Commune of Cendajuru, Cankuzo Province, were destroying rice, cassava and bean crops and terrorizing the local population.

== Sources ==
- Etude d’Impact Environnemental et Social des sous-projets du 5ème portefeuille du PTPGU (PDF) (in French), Ministere des transports, des travaux publics et de l’equipement, September 2013
- Inauguration officielle du pont Bailey sur la rivière Rumpungwe, commune Kinyinya, province Ruyigi, 14/11/2016 (in French), European Union External Action, 16 November 2016
- Mugisha, Hervé (19 May 2022), "Gisuru: des hippopotames sèment le chaos", Iwacu (in French)
- Ramsar Site no. 2150 Fiche descriptive (PDF) (in French), Ramsar, 14 March 2013
- "Way: Rumpungwe (124128971)", OpenStreetMap
