= Commune of Bukemba =

Coordinates: 4°00′15″S 30°04′28″E

- Commune
- Interactive map of Commune of Bukemba
- Country: Burundi
- Province: Rutana Province
- Administrative center: Bukemba
- Time zone: UTC+2 (Central Africa Time)

The commune of Bukemba is a commune of Rutana Province in southeastern Burundi. The capital lies at Bukemba.

== Places in the commune ==
- Gihofi
