= Rutana =

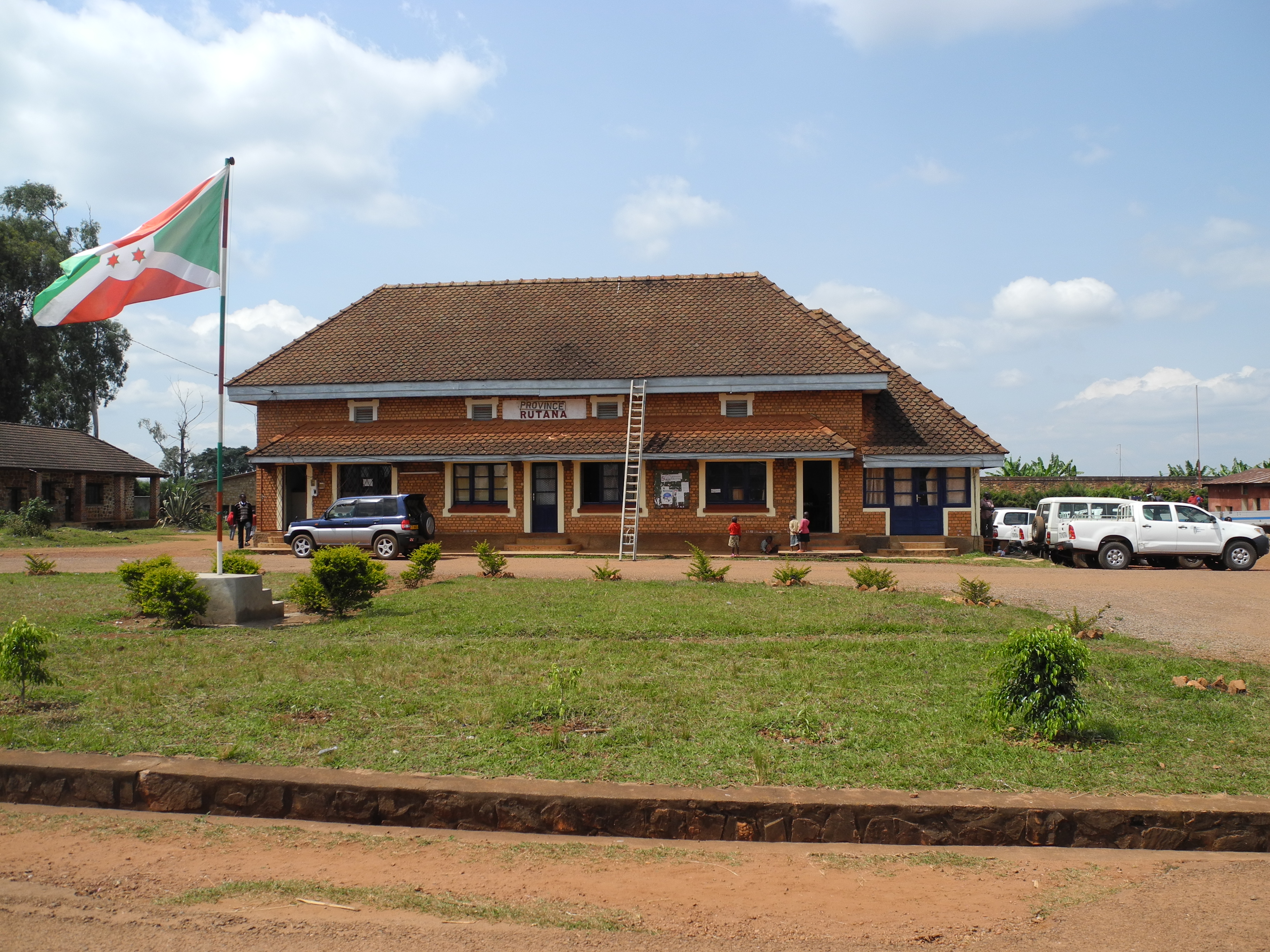

- Location in Burundi
- Coordinates: 3°55′S 30°00′E
- Country: Burundi
- Province: Rutana Province
- Elevation: 1,719 m (5,640 ft)

Population (2012)
  - Total: 23,654

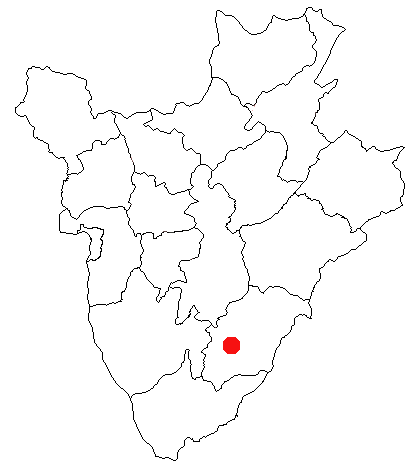
Location of Rutana in Burundi

Rutana is a town in southern Burundi. It lies west of Mount Kikizi, one of the highest mountains in the nation. The Kagera Falls lie near the town. It is the capital of Rutana Province, one of the 18 provinces of Burundi.
