= Commune of Gitanga =

Coordinates: 3°58′52″S 29°53′54″E

- Commune
- Interactive map of Commune of Gitanga
- Country: Burundi
- Province: Rutana Province
- Administrative center: Gitanga
- Time zone: UTC+2 (Central Africa Time)

The commune of Gitanga is a commune of Rutana Province in southeastern Burundi. The capital lies at Gitanga.
