= Commune of Giharo =

Coordinates: 3°46′50″S 30°14′40″E

- Commune
- Interactive map of Commune of Giharo
- Country: Burundi
- Province: Rutana Province
- Administrative center: Giharo
- Time zone: UTC+2 (Central Africa Time)

The commune of Giharo is a commune of Rutana Province in southeastern Burundi. The capital lies at Giharo.
