= Natural regions of Burundi =

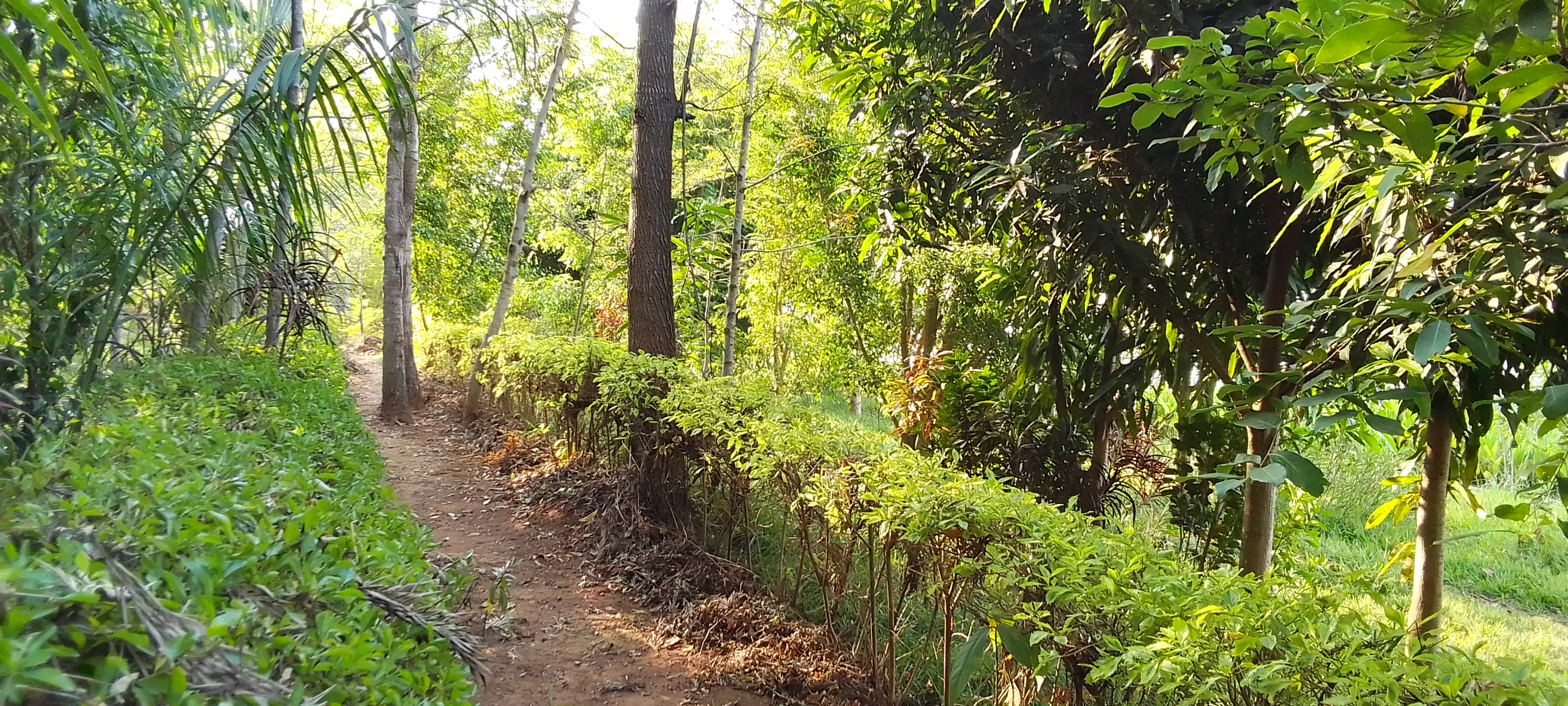
Path to Lake Rwihinda in Kirundo Province, Bugesera natural region

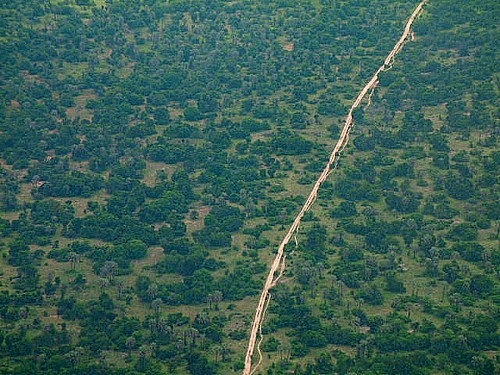
Strip of road running through the forest in Burundi

The Natural regions of Burundi (French: Régions naturelles du Burundi) are geographical subdivisions of Burundi that date to colonial times. They can be broadly grouped into the Plain zone in the west beside Lake Tanganyika and the East African Rift valley, the Congo-Nile ridge, the Central Plateaus and the Depressions to the north, east and south of the plateaus.

== Context ==
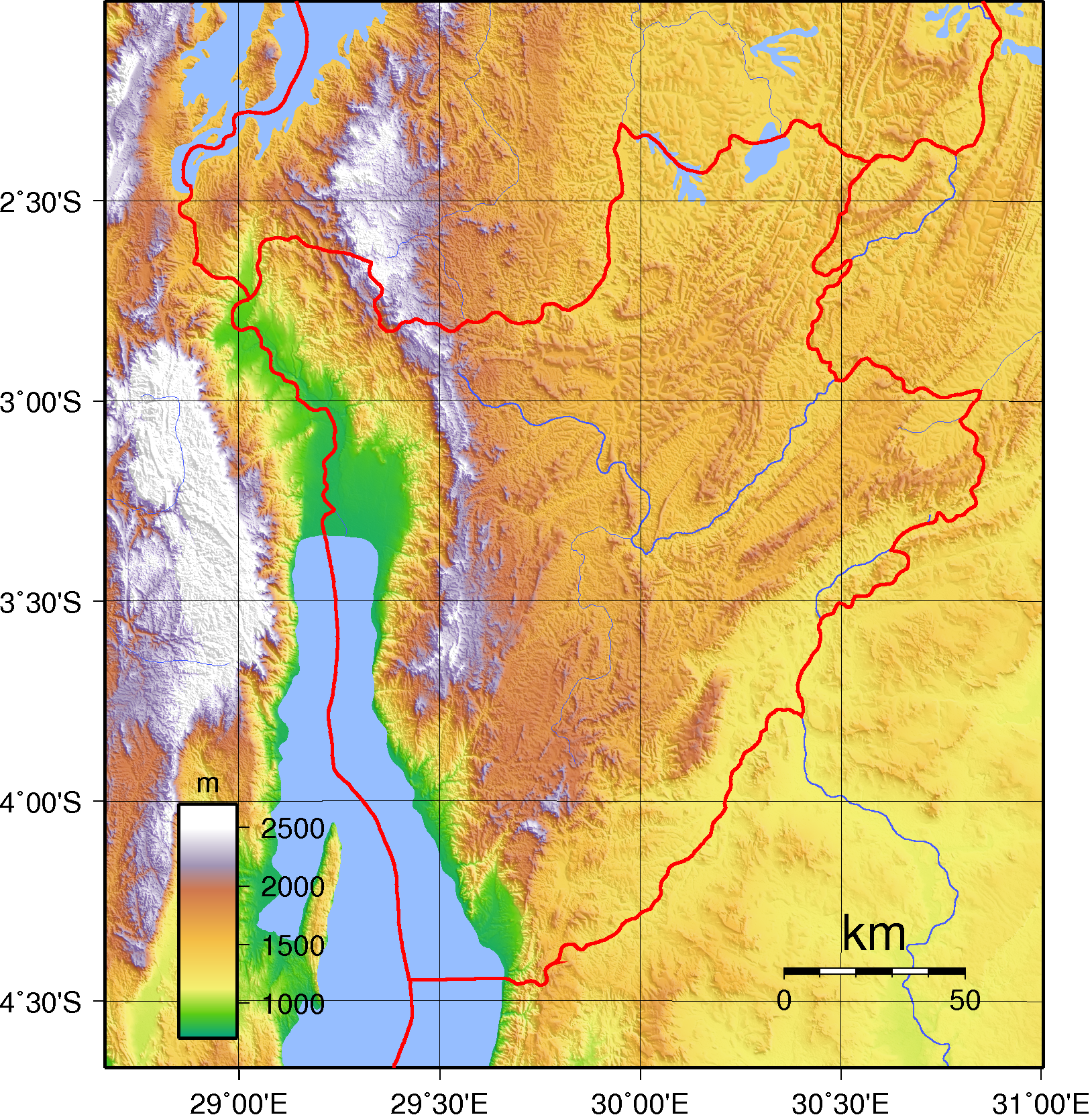
Topography of Burundi

Burundi is mostly between 1,500 and 2,000 metres (4,900 and 6,600 ft) above sea level. The highest ridges reach 2,670 metres (8,760 ft) and the lowest area is at 774 metres (2,539 ft) beside Lake Tanganyika. It can be divided into four general topological zones: the Plain zone, holding the natural region of Imbo, with an altitude less than 1,000 metres (3,300 ft); the Congo-Nile ridge including the Mumirwa and Mugamba natural regions; the Central Plateaus including Kirimiro, Buyogoma, Bututsi, Bweru and Buyenzi; and the Depressions of Moso in the east, Buragane in the south, and Bugesera in the north.

Burundi may also be divided into five ecological zones: The first three are the same as the topological zones: the Imbo Plain, Congo-Nile Crest and Central Plateaus. The fourth is the Kumoso Depression, including the Moso and Buragane natural regions. The fifth is the Bugesera Depression in the north.

The original nine natural regions were based in part on geography, geology and climate, but also considered history, the economy and society. They were Imbo, Mumirwa, Mugamba, Buyenzi, Buyogoma, Bweru, Bututsi, Moso and Kirimiro. The current eleven regions are based on relief, climate, altitude and the nature of the soil. They are Imbo, Mumirwa, Mugamba and Bututsi in the west; Buyenzi, Bweru, Kirimiro and Buyogoma in the center; Moso and Buragane in the east; and Bugesera in the north.

== Plain zone ==
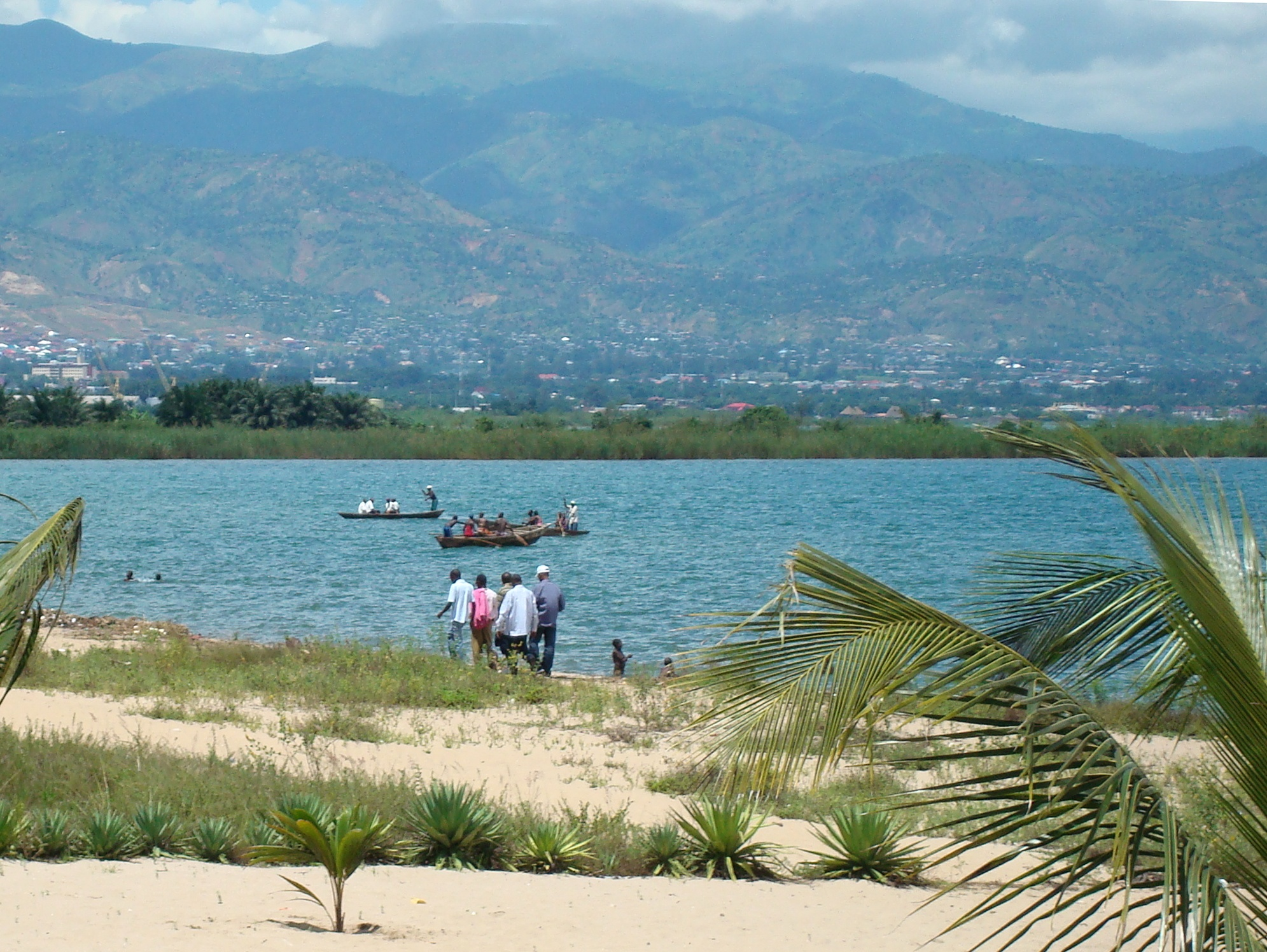
View of Bujumbura and Lake Tanganyika from one of the beaches north of the capital

A large part of the population of the Plain zone is urban, including residents of the capital Bujumbura and the cities of Rumonge and Nyanza Lac. It was politically separate from the Kingdom of Burundi until the start of the twentieth century.

=== Imbo natural region ===
The Imbo region (Région naturelle d'Imbo) extends along the East African Rift valley and the shore of Lake Tanganyika. The region covers the west of the Cibitoke Province and Bubanza Province, all of Mairie Province, the west of Bujumbura Province, Bururi Province and Makamba Province. The Imbo region is a narrow strip along the east of the Ruzizi River and Lake Tanganyika. It has a flat or slightly undulating topography. It is easily flooded by mountain torrents in the rainy season, and is quite dry in the dry season, which lasts four to six months. Temperatures range from 24 to 30 °C (75 to 86 °F).

== Congo-Nile ridge ==
The Congo-Nile ridge is an immense steep slope with very rugged relief that forms the divide between the Nile and the Congo River. Mumirwa natural region covers the western foothills, or "Mirwa", of the ridge, while Mugamba natural region contains the highest part of the ridge. The two natural regions have many common characteristics.

=== Mumirwa natural region ===
The Mumirwa region (Région naturelle de Mumirwa) is one of large hills that penetrate the central plateaus. It was defined during the colonial era. Before then, Mumirwa and Imbo were one region. The Mumirwa region extends from north to south through the central part of Cibitoke Province, the east of Bubanza Province and the central parts of Bujumbura Province and Bururi Province, extending into the northest of Makamba Province. The Mumirwa region is part of the western slope of the Congo–Nile Divide, above the plains along the Rusizi River and Lake Tanganyika, and below the high peaks of the divide, with altitudes of 1,000 to 1,900 metres (3,300 to 6,200 ft).

=== Mugamba natural region ===
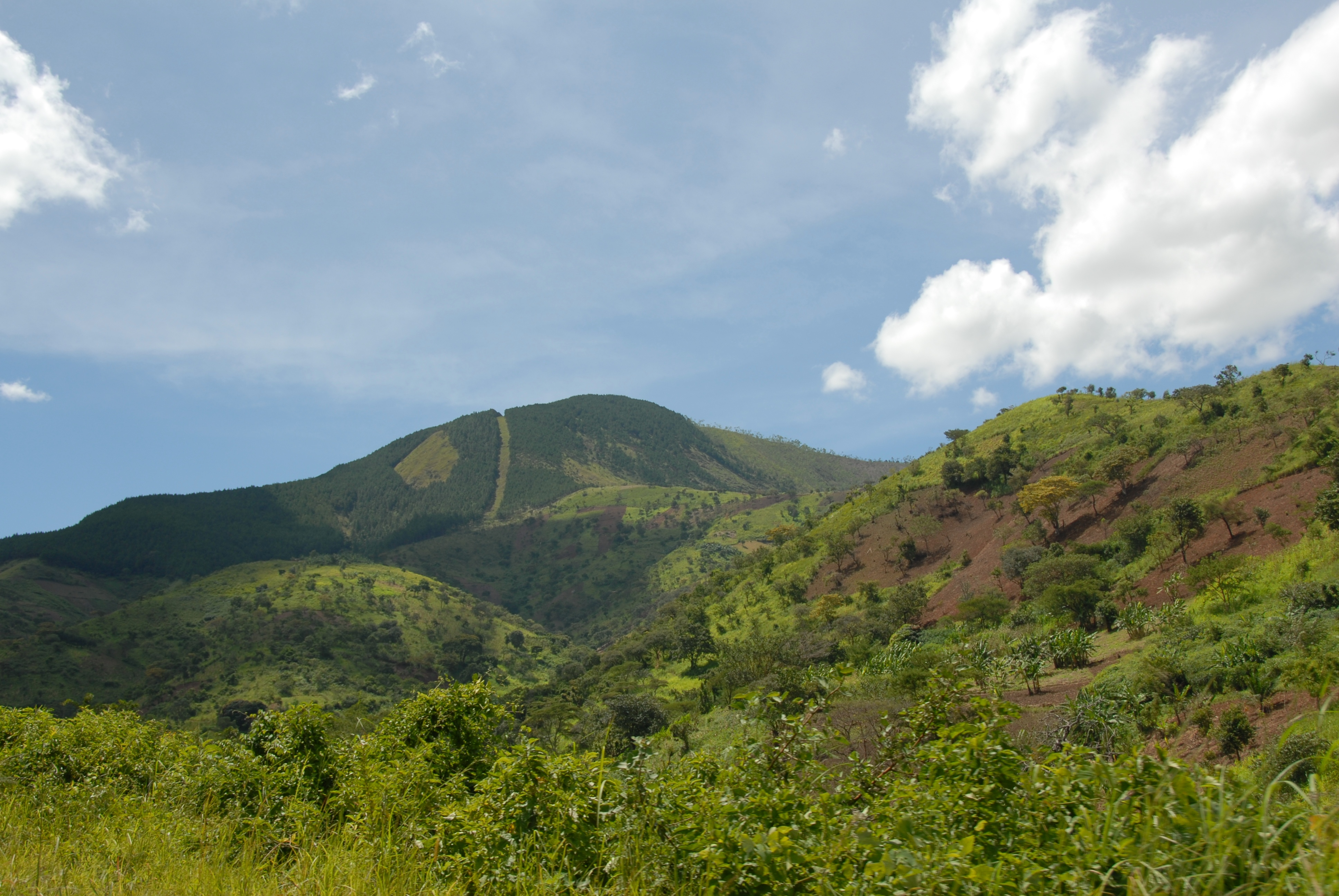
Road between Bujumbura and Makamba in Mugamba natural region

The Mugamba ("Cow") region (Région naturelle de Mugamba) has a cool climate, and was a region where livestock were the basis of the economy. The Mugamba region extends from north to south through the east of Cibitoke Province, the west of Kayanza Province and Muramvya Province, the east of Bujumbura Province, the west of Mwaro Province and the north of Bururi Province. Mugamba contains the highest peaks of the country: Heha at 2,670 metres (8,760 ft), Teza at 2,655 metres (8,711 ft) and Twinyoni at 2,652 metres (8,701 ft).

== Central Plateaus ==
The Central Plateaus contain the natural regions of Kirimiro, Buyogoma, Bututsi, Bweru and Buyenzi, and is mostly 1,500 to 1,800 metres (4,900 to 5,900 ft) above sea level. The term "central plateaus" is somewhat misleading, since there is varied topography including very steep slopes. Water courses cut deeply through the terrain, separating many hills.

=== Kirimiro natural region ===
The Kirimiro region (Région naturelle de Kirimiro) has many abundant crops. It covers the east of Muramvya Province and Mwaro Province, and most of Gitega Province. Altitude ranges from 1,500 to 2,000 metres (4,900 to 6,600 ft), sloping down gradually from west to east. The region has a mild, humid tropical climate, with annual precipitation between 1,040 and 1,400 millimetres (41 and 55 in). Temperatures are between 15 and 20 °C (59 and 68 °F), with average of 17–18 °C (63–64 °F).

As of 2014 the Kirimiro natural region was the most densely populated of the natural regions, with over 287,179 agricultural households, or 18.4% of agricultural households in Burundi. Kirimo had about 1,492,520 inhabitants, or 17.8% of the total agricultural population. Kirimiro natural region and the 502,135 hectares (1,240,800 acres) Kirimiro coffee-growing region have much the same boundaries. The relatively cool climate and low rainfall are not ideal for growing coffee.

=== Buyogoma natural region ===
The Buyogoma region (Région naturelle de Buyogoma) was integrated with Burundi in the nineteenth century under King Ntare Rugamba. The region covers the southeast of Karuzi Province and the northwest of Cankuzo Province, Ruyigi Province and Rutana Province. In Buyogoma, lithosols develop on ferruginous crusts on the tops of the hills, often with very hard lateritic beds. Humic ferralitic soils are found in the lowlands.

=== Bututsi natural region ===
The colonial natural region of Bututsi was region where many of the people were Tutsi, living mostly by livestock but with some agriculture. The region covers the east of Bururi Province. As of 2014 the Bututsi natural region had 44,914 agricultural households, or 2.9% of agricultural households in Burundi.

=== Bweru natural region ===
The Bweru region (Région naturelle du Bweru) is rich agriculturally. 12% of Kirundo Province, is in the Bweru natural region, including the Commune of Vumbi and the south of the Commune of Gitobe. The region covers the south part of the Muyinga Province, the east of Ngozi Province and the north part of Karuzi Province. As of 2014 the Bweru natural region had 176,101 agricultural households, or 11.3% of agricultural households in Burundi.

=== Buyenzi natural region ===
The Buyenzi natural region covers most of Ngozi Province and the east half of Kayanza Province. As of 2014 the Buyenzi natural region had 243,336 agricultural households, or 15.6% of agricultural households in Burundi. The Buyenzi region has 1,237,000 people engaged in agriculture, or 14.8% of the total agricultural population.

== Depressions ==
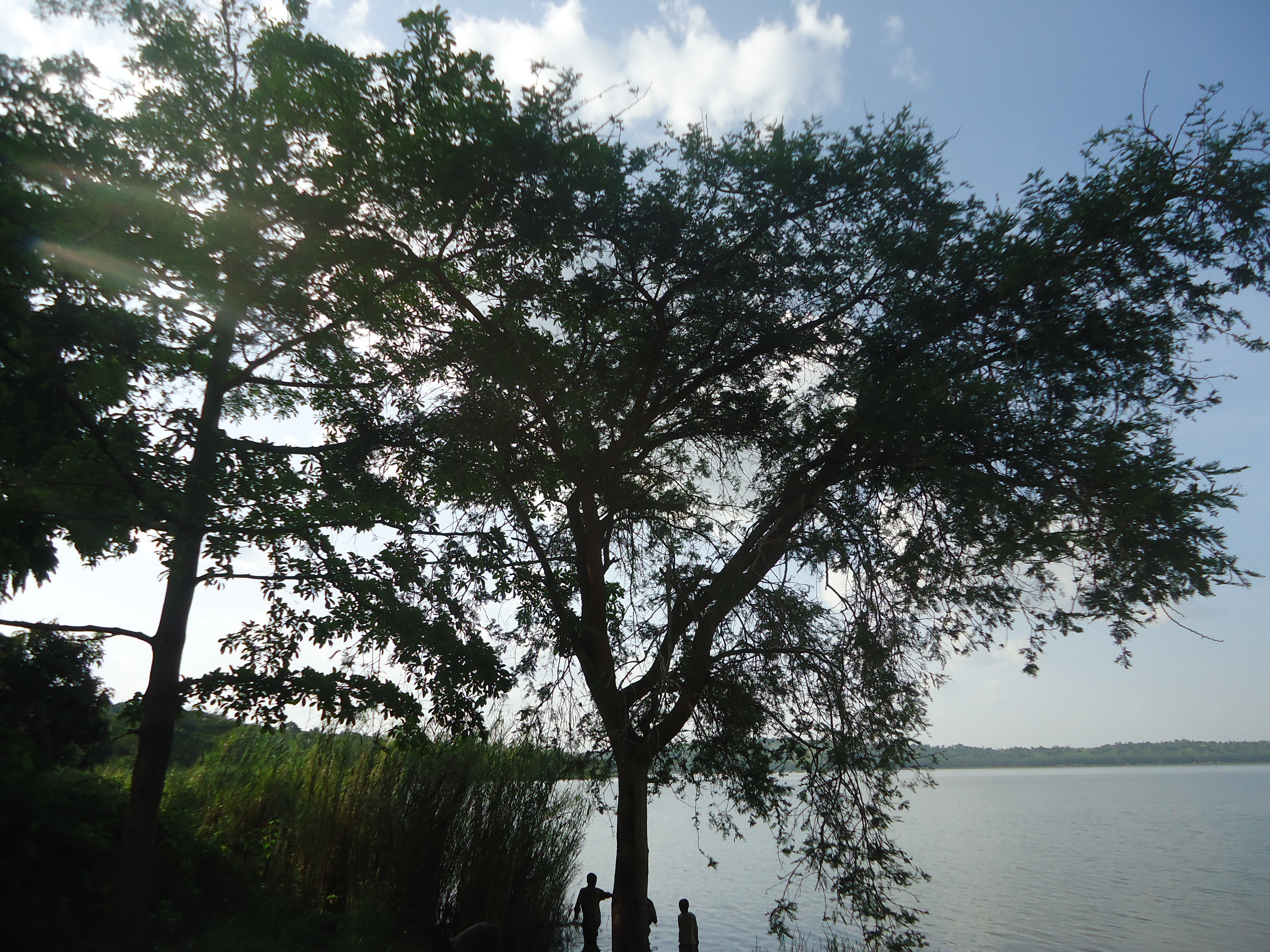
Lake Rwihinda in the Bugesera region

The Depressions hold the natural regions of Moso in the east, Buragane in the south and Bugesera in the north. They are 1,000 to 1,200 metres (3,300 to 3,900 ft) above sea level. The Kumoso Depression ecological region extends over the Moso natural region and the Buragane natural region, and does not include Bugesera. To the west it is bounded by the slopes of the eastern part of the central plateaus, to the northeast by Tanzania and to the south by the southern termination of the Congo-Nile ridge. Altitude is 1,150 to 1,400 metres (3,770 to 4,590 ft).

=== Moso natural region ===
The Moso natural region is a depression in the east of the country dominated by the Nkoma massif. It is hot, and there is always the threat of drought. The region covers the southeast of Cankuzo Province, Ruyigi Province and Rutana Province and the east of Makamba Province. The Rumpungwe River collects the waters of the northern part of the Moso depression, while the Malagarasi River collects the waters of the southern part.

=== Buragane natural region ===
The Buragane natural region is similar to Moso, It is hot, and there is always the threat of drought. The region covers the central part of Makamba Province and extends into the southwest of Rutana Province. As of 2014 the Bugarane natural region had about 22,244 agricultural households, or 1.4% of agricultural households in Burundi. Buragane region has about 145,149 people in agricultural households, or 1.7% of Burundi's agricultural population.

=== Bugesera natural region ===
Bugasera (Région naturelle du Bugesera) is a vast batholith, a depression of granite rocks. It suffers from periodic drought. The region covers most of Kirundo Province and the north part of Muyinga Province. The central plateau has an altitude of 1,500 to 2,000 metres (4,900 to 6,600 ft), and the north is lower, with an average altitude of 1,300 metres (4,300 ft). The Bugesera region is part of the Kirundo district, a depression in the inter-lacustrine zone of East Africa that extends across northeastern Burundi and southeastern Rwanda. It is bounded to the west by the Akanyaru River valley. To the north, east and south it is bounded by dissected plateaus that rise above it. The depression contains large valleys holding Holocene sediments, swamps and shallow lakes.

== Sources ==
- Atlas des quatre sites Ramsar: Localisation et Resources (PDF) (in French), Ministry of Water, Environment and Urbanism, October 2014
- Baranderetse, Jules (2014), Analyse des déterminants de l'offre du café dans la région naturelle de Kirimiro (1990-2012) (in French)
- Enquête Nationale Agricole du Burundi. Campagne 2013-2014 (PDF) (in French), Ministère des Finances et de la Planification du Développement Economique / Ministère de l’Agriculture et de l’Elevage, July 2015
- Irambona, Yvette (12 April 2022), Les régions naturelles du Burundi : Leur signification se fonde sur plusieurs critères (in French)
- Minani, Bonaventure; Rurema, Déo-Guide; Lebailly, Philippe (2013), Analyse et stratégies de l’agriculture familiale dans un pays post-conflit : cas de la province de Kirundo au nord du Burundi (PDF) (in French)
- Nsabimana, Stanislas (1990), "L'aménagement agricole de l'Imbo au Burundi [article]", Pays enclavés (in French), 3: 48–58
- Plan régional de mise en œuvre de la Stratégie Nationale et Plan d’Action sur la Biodiversité dans la dépression de Kumoso (PDF) (in French), Bujumbura: Ministère de l’Eau, de l’Environnement, de l’Aménagement du Territoire et de l’Urbanisme, October 2013
- Ramsar Site no. 2150 Fiche descriptive (PDF) (in French), Ramsar, 14 March 2013
- Segamba, Léonce; Ndikumasabo, Vincent; Makinson, Carolyn; Ayad, Mohamed (1988), Enquête Démographique et de Santé au Burundi 1987. (PDF) (in French), Columbia, Maryland, USA: Ministère de l'Intérieur Département de la Population/Burundi and Institute for Resource Development/Westinghouse.
- Sibomana, Alexis; Gangadhara Bhat, H.; Ngenzi, J.C. (December 2017), "Groundwater Prospects in Kirundo District, Northern Burundi: Modeling By Remote Sensing And GIS", International Journal of Information Research and Review (Conference Paper)
- Strategie nationale et plan d’action de lutte contre la degradation des sols 2011-2016 (PDF) (in French), Bujumbura: Ministere de l’eau, de l’environnement, de l’amenagement du territoire et de l’urbanisme, June 2011
