= Malagarasi River =

River in Burundi

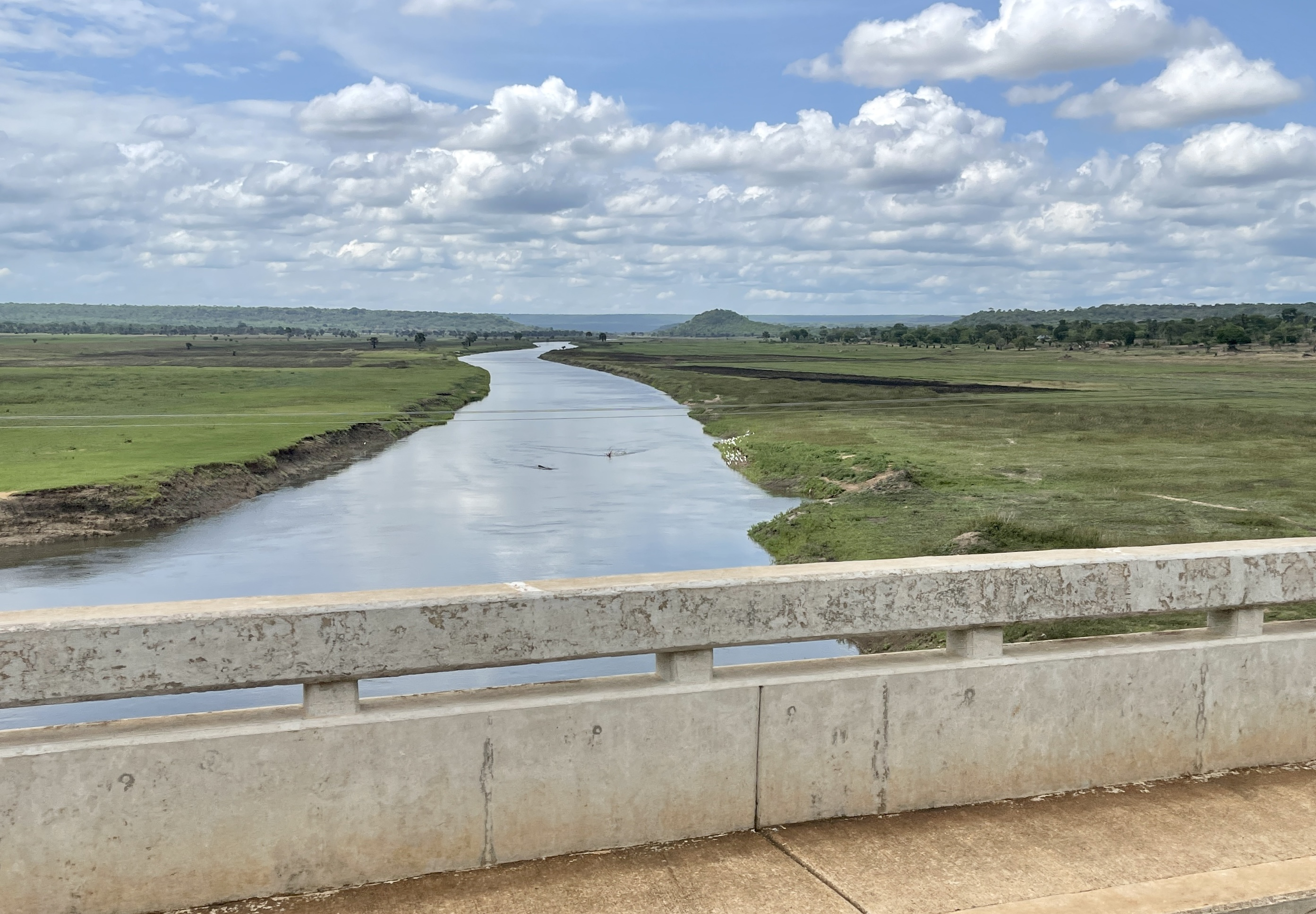

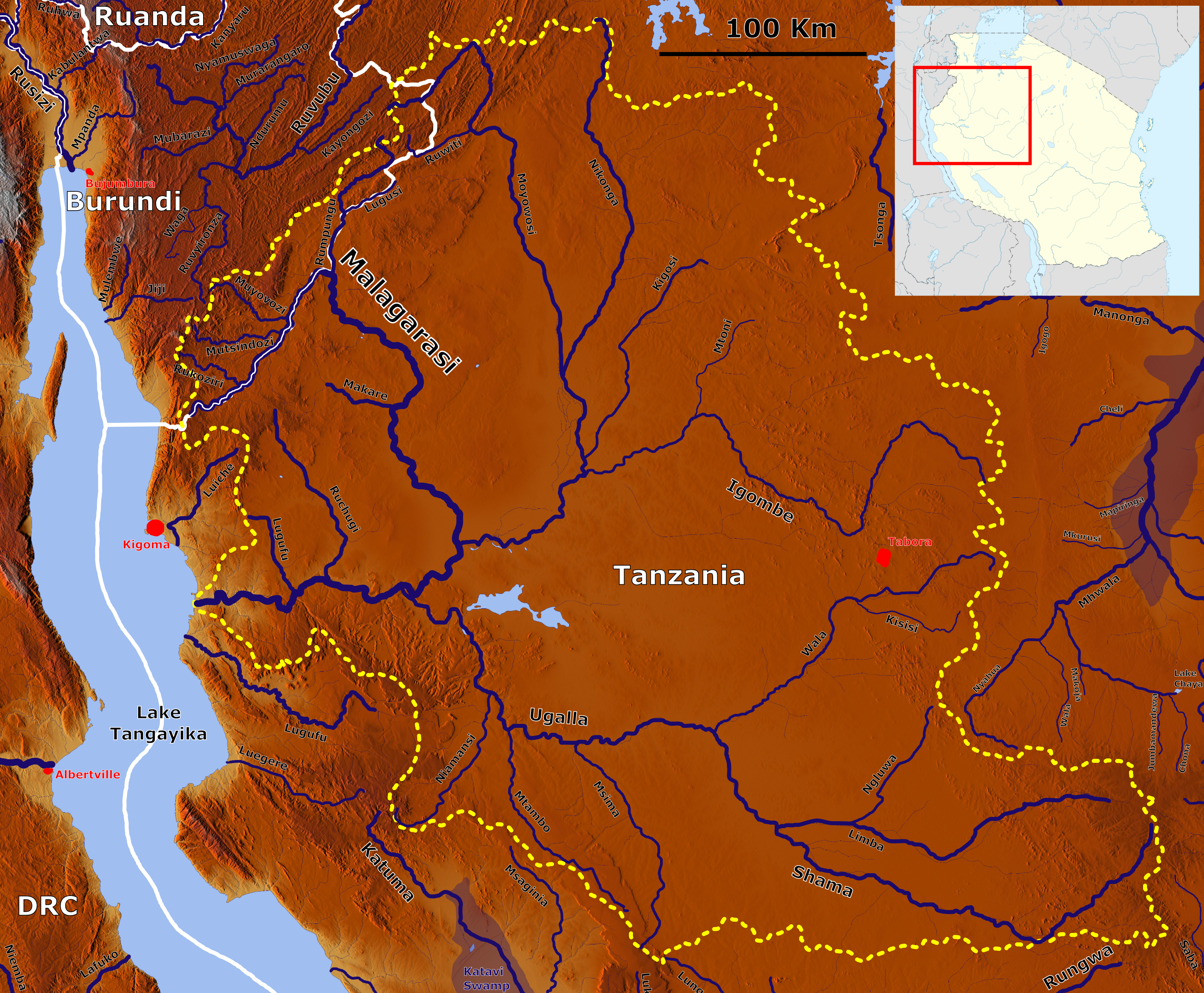

Location
- Country: Burundi
- Country: Tanzania

Physical characteristics
- Mouth
  - coordinates: 5°15′23″S 29°48′6″E
- Length: 475 km (295 mi)
- Basin size: 130,000 km^{2} (50,000 sq mi)

Basin features
- River system: Congo River

The Malagarasi River is a river in western Tanzania, flowing through Kigoma Region, although one of its tributaries comes from southeastern Burundi. The river also forms the western border of Tabora Region, the southern border of Kagera Region and the southwestern border of Geita Region. It is the second-longest river in Tanzania behind the Rufiji—Great Ruaha, and has the largest watershed of any river flowing into Lake Tanganyika. The Malagarasi-Muyovozi Wetlands are a designated a Ramsar site. Local tribes have nicknamed the Malagarasi as "the river of bad spirits".

== Geography ==
The Malagarasi is the second-longest river in Tanzania, at 475 kilometres (295 mi).

The source of the river is near the Tanzania-Burundi border. The first 80 kilometres (50 mi) of the river form the international boundary between Tanzania and Burundi. Several tributaries from the Burundi highlands join its right bank. After the confluence with the Lumpungu River, the Malagarasi enters Tanzania, makes a circle and empties into the eastern side of Lake Tanganyika about 25 miles (40 km) south of Kigoma, near Ilagala. It is one of the lake's primary inflows. Moyowosi River is the principal tributary, along with its affluent the Nikongo River; other tributaries include Ugalla River, Gombe River, Ruchugi River, Lumpungu River, and Nguya River. It is characterized as a low stream river, and its drainage includes four biotopes: swampy areas, river channels, a flowing river with a few moderate rapids, and a large double-branched delta.

The flow of the river ranges dramatically between the annual cycle of wet and dry seasons, and at times may be susceptible to flooding or reduced to a small stream; flow is also affected by local agriculture and deforestation which increase the level of sediments within the river. At Mberagule, the flow of the river has been gauged to be 6.9 cubic kilometers per year. About 80 kilometres (50 mi) from the mouth, the river flows through the Moyowosi swamplands, an area of "extensive swamps and floodplains" and a "marshy labyrinth". It passes through the Dodoma Belt, a geological area of Archaean and Proterozoic age Precambrian crystalline rocks.

=== Watershed ===
With a basin area of 130,000 square kilometres (50,000 sq mi), the Malagarasi has the largest watershed of all of the rivers flowing into Lake Tanganyika. The Malagarasi watershed constitutes 30% of the Lake Tanganyika's total watershed area.

The Malagarasi watershed is bounded on the north by the watershed of Lake Victoria, on the east by the closed basin of the Southern Eastern Rift, to the south by the closed basin of Lake Rukwa, and to the east by Lake Tanganyika.

Most of the basin is miombo woodland, with Brachystegia spiciformis and Julbernardia globiflora as the dominant trees. There are extensive areas of flooded grassland in the central Malagarasi-Moyowosi basin, and along the middle Ugalla River to the southwest.

== History ==
According to ecologist Rosemary Lowe-McConnell, "the Malagarasi and the Rungwa River are assumed to be relict headwaters of the extended pre-rift Zaire system". The Malagarasi pre-dates Lake Tanganyika and was in pre-rift times a tributary of the Congo River to its west. Lake Tanganyika has since said to have "undergone both transgression and regression, depositing new sediments, altering the delta, and changing the course of the river". Over its history, the lake level has altered dramatically between 100 and 200 metres (330 and 660 ft); historical accounts from the late nineteenth century indicate that it was about 10 metres (33 ft) higher than it is today.

== Culture ==
Local tribes have nicknamed the Malagarasi as "the river of bad spirits". In the late 19th century, the Wavinza people, who ran the river's ferry service from the left bank, avoided assimilation with the Wanyamwezi people because of the natural barrier formed by the Malagarasi. Also on the other bank were the Wangoni (Watutu Zulus). Henry Morton Stanley, who considered missionaries important to Africa's "civilizing process", stated that missionaries could follow the Malagarasi and participate in "conversion-tours to Uvinza, Uha, and Ugala".

== Flora and fauna ==
The tree species in the Malagarasi basin include Albizia gummifera, Bridelia micrantha, Cyperus papyrus, Diospyros mespiliformis, Ficus sycomorus, Ficus verruculosa, Isoberlinia spp., Khaya senegalensis, Parkia filicoidea, Phoenix reclinata, Syzygium cordatum, and Syzygium owariense. The prominent grasses in the valley grasslands are species of Hyparrhenia, Themeda, and Echinochloa.

The Malagarasi sardine (Mesobola spinifer) is endemic to the river. The Malagarasi contains several fish species which occur in the Congo River Basin but not in Lake Tanganyika. Giant freshwater Mbu pufferfish, however, occur in both the Central and Upper Zaire Basin and the Malagarasi River.

== Malagarasi-Muyovozi Wetlands ==
The Malagarasi-Muyovozi Wetlands lie in the middle of the basin, at 1200 meters elevation at the confluence of the Malagarasi with the Gombe, Muyovozi, Ugalla, and other tributary rivers. The wetland includes 250,000 hectares (620,000 acres) of dry-season lakes and open water including Sagara and Nyamagoma lakes, and 200,000 hectares (490,000 acres) of permanent papyrus swamp. Seasonally-flooded grasslands on the surrounding floodplain vary seasonally and with annual rainfall, and can cover up to 1.5 million hectares (3.7×10^{6} acres).

The papyrus swamps are dominated by the sedge Cyperus papyrus and the grass Oryza barthii. The seasonally-flooded grasslands include Hyparrhenia rufa and Echinochloa pyramidalis, with Hyparrhenia dominant in the least-flooded areas, Echinochloa in more frequently-flooded areas, and Vossia nearest the permanent wetlands.

The middle and upper reaches of the Ugalla River include a seasonally-inundated floodplain 120 kilometres (75 mi) long and up to 50 kilometres (31 mi) wide. The floodplain supports extensive grasslands, dominated by the grasses Echinochloa haploclada, Themeda triandra, Setaria spp., Andropogon spp., Eragrostis spp., Digitaria spp., and Sporobolus spp. The floodplains include scattered trees including Combretum fragrans, C. obovatum and C. purpureiflorum, groves of the palm Borassus aethiopum, and small patches of closed-canopy forest on large termite mounds.

Vulnerable and endangered animals in the wetland include Shoebill (Balaeniceps rex), Wattled crane (Bugeranus carunculatus), African bush elephant (Loxodonta africana), Sitatunga (Tragalephus spekii) and Central African slender-snouted crocodile (Mecistops leptorhynchus). The wetlands are home to 50 species of fish, including the Dark stonebasher (Pollimyrus nigricans) and various endangered, endemic, and food species. Waterbuck (Kobus ellipsiprymnus) and hippopotamus (Hippopotamus amphibius) are common in the wetlands. Concerns have been raised over hippo poaching in the river basin by the Wanyahosa people, who prefer the meat over fish.

== Protected areas ==
The Malagarasi-Muyovozi Wetlands became a designated a Ramsar site on April 13, 2000. It is the country's first Ramsar Site. At 35,000 square kilometres (14,000 sq mi) it is the world's third-largest Ramsar Site.
