= Rutana Province =

Province of Burundi

Coordinates: 3°52′40″S 30°9′36″E

Rutana Province Mkoa wa Rutana
- province
- Country: Burundi
- Capital: Rutana

Area
  - Total: 1,959.45 km^{2} (756.55 sq mi)

Population (2008 census)
  - Total: 333,510
  - Density: 170.21/km^{2} (440.83/sq mi)

Rutana was one of the provinces of Burundi. In 2025, it became part of the new province of Burunga.

It contained the Karera waterfalls, and the Nyakazu Fault.

== Location ==
Rutana Province was in the southeast of Burundi and borders Tanzania to the east. Makamba Province was to the south, Bururi Province and Gitega Province to the west and Ruyigi Province to the north. The west of the province is in the Buragane natural region, the northwest in the Buyogoma natural region and the east in the Kumoso natural region.

== History ==
Rutana Province was originally created on 26 September 1960 as part of national political and administrative reforms initiated by the Belgian colonial administration in Ruanda-Urundi. In 1962 Burundi became independent. The new constitution reduced the number of provinces and Rutana was merged into Bururi Province and Ruyigi Province. In 2025, Rutana was merged once again into the new province of Burunga.

== Communes ==
It is divided administratively into the following communes:

- Commune of Bukemba
- Commune of Giharo
- Commune of Gitanga
- Commune of Mpinga-Kayove
- Commune of Musongati
- Commune of Rutana

== Sources ==
- Atlas des quatre sites Ramsar: Localisation et Resources (PDF) (in French), Ministry of Water, Environment and Urbanism, October 2014

== Works cited ==
- Weinstein, Warren (1976). Historical Dictionary of Burundi. Metuchen: Scarecrow Press. ISBN 978-0-8108-0962-8.
