= Mining industry of Burundi =

Burundi is a producer of columbium (niobium) and tantalum ore, tin ore, and tungsten ore, and some deposits of gold which are designated for export. Burundi has resources of copper, cobalt, nickel, feldspar, phosphate rock, quartzite, and rare reserves of uranium, and vanadium.

== Industry regulation ==
Under the Mining and Petroleum Act of 1976 (amended 1982) prospecting authorizations were granted for defined perimeters for two years and were renewable. They were non-exclusive and did not grant any title in the minerals. Research permits were granted through a public procurement process. They allowed evaluation of the quantity and usefulness of the reserves, and what would be involved in extracting, processing and marketing them. They were exclusive, and if they showed proof of a deposit they gave the right to an exploitation license, available for 5-year terms, with two renewals. The holder of an exploitation permit could apply for a concession, granted for a period of 25 years, with the possibility of two 10-year renewals.

An update to the 1975 Act was adopted in October 2013, addressing minerals but not hydrocarbons. Under this code, the state would not be a mining operator, but would have the right to a 15% share in mining projects. Taxes were defined for base metals (4%), precious metals (5%), precious stones (7%) and other minerals (2%). Mining permits would be granted only to legal persons headquartered in Burundi. Mining activities would be subject to corporate income tax and customs duties. The code also covered artisanal exploitation, surface or shallow pit extraction and concentration using non-industrial processes.

In a speech on Burundi's independence day on 1 July 2021 Evariste Ndayishimiye, President of Burundi, stated that foreign companies were making excessive profits from mining resources such as nickel, rare earth, gold, and coltan. He ordered that all foreign companies suspend their mining activities as of 14 July 2021.

The industry today is regulated by the Ministry of Hydraulics, Energy and Mines. The primary law is the Mining Code 2023 (Law No.1/19), which regulates all aspects from prospecting through to sale of minerals and fossils. Under this code, a fixed share of production, determined by regulation, is reserved for the state. Enrichment or refining must start in Burundi within two years of start of exploitation, with the process and percentage defined by regulation, although waivers might be allowed if the value is low. A two-year return on investment is required, with research expenses audited and approved by the ministry. The state owns at least 16% of the operating company, increasing by 5% at each renewal.

== General ==
As of 2013 there were about 10,000 artisanal miners in Burundi, of whom about two thirds were mining gold. The other third were mining tin, tungsten, tantalum ores. Mining made up under 1% of GDP and 0.3% of fiscal revenues, although the country exported 2.8 million tons of gold worth over US$100 million in 2013.

After the 2013 Mining Code was adopted there were delays in issuing a new mining regulation to implement it. This indicated that the government was more interested in taxation than in a transparent and well-managed mining section. Taxation is mainly concerned with cooperatives and comptoirs (exchanges).

In 2015 corruption was endemic. Many miners saw unofficial payments to state security forces as legitimate. Illegal taxes were also paid to local state agents. Mining companies and cooperatives would under-report their output to avoid taxes, and individual miners would conceal part of their production and sell it to illicit traders.

== Gold ==
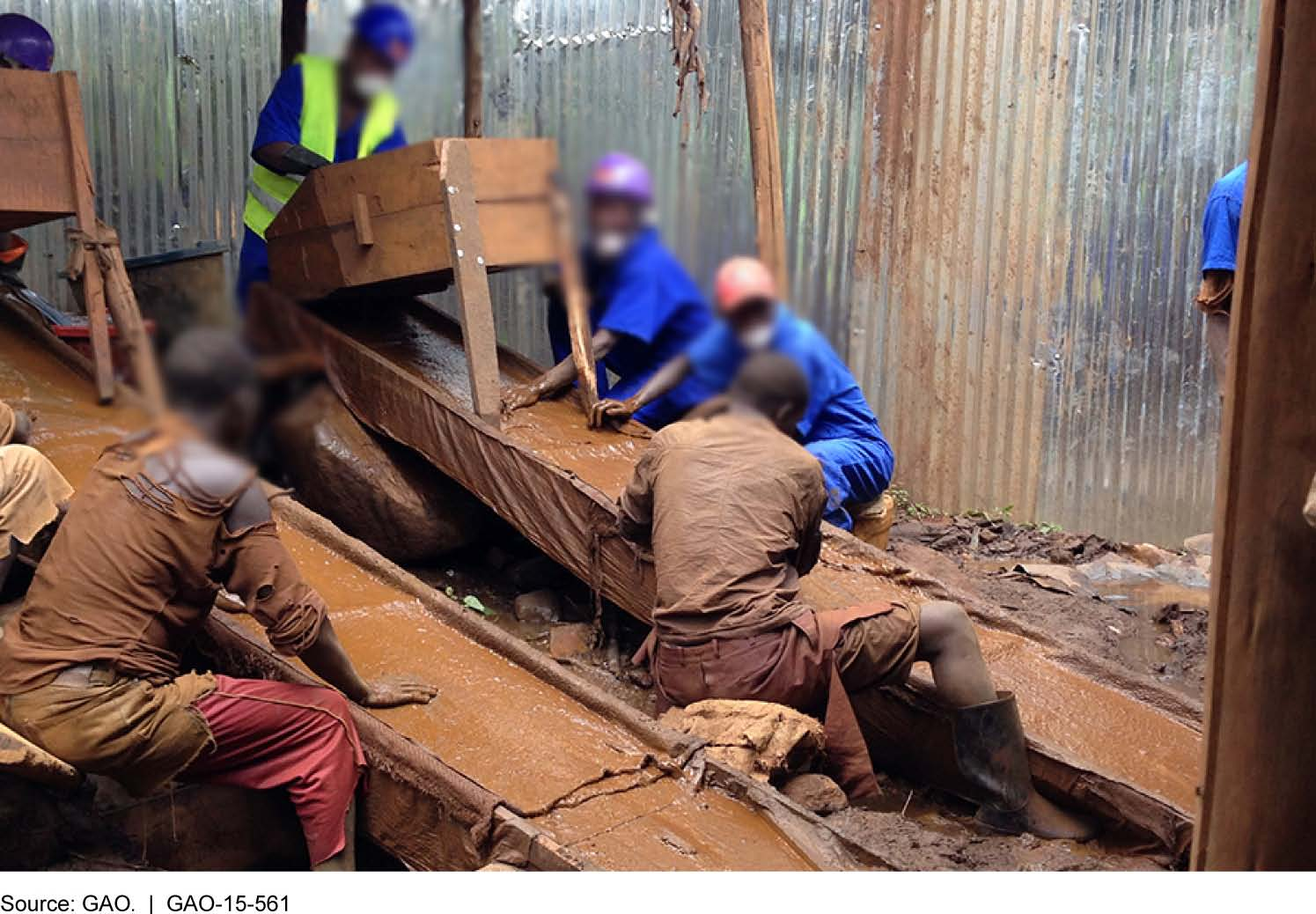
Gold mine in Burundi 2015

A 2016 World Bank report estimated that between 14,000 and 27,000 miners were involved in producing gold. In November 2019, the Government banned mining cooperatives and companies from selling gold to private buyers. The Central Bank was established as the sole buyer of gold. Between 2015 and 2019 estimated annual gold production fluctuated between 396 kilograms (873 lb) and 953 kilograms (2,101 lb).

=== Artisanal mining ===
Artisanal gold miners use the Nyamagana (2.93435°S 29.133044°E), Muhira, Kaburantwa and Kagunuzi rivers in the provinces of Cibitoke, Bubanza and Kayanza to wash their products; builders extract rubble, gravel and sand for construction from the rivers; and farmers weaken their banks by failing to leave a 5 metres (16 ft) strip of uncultivated land along the banks. All this contributes to pollution of the river water and to collapse of the banks, damaging bridges, roads, buildings and other infrastructure near the rivers.

=== African Mining Burundi ===
African Mining Burundi was established on 8 August 2018 as an 85% subsidiary of African Mining Limited, with the state holding 15%. The new company was licensed to exploit the gold deposit in Masaka (2.75719°S 30.28514°E) and in nine other identified mining sites. Operations were suspended in 2021.

=== Tanganyika Mining Burundi ===
In October 2017 Tanganyika Gold was granted a 25-year gold mining license at the Cimba site in the Commune of Mabayi, which contained an estimated 14 tonnes of gold, 36,000 tonnes of copper and 16 tonnes of silver. Decree No100/250 of 29 December 2017 authorized the state of Burundi to participate in the capital of the public-private company Tanganyika Mining Burundi, charged with exploiting the gold and associated minerals from the Cimba deposit at 2.78160°S 29.25377°E. The state would take 15% in exchange for transfer of the subsoil of the Cimba deposit, while Tanganyika Gold S.A. would take 85% in exchange for construction, development and operation of the mine, and rehabilitation of the site. On 15 July 2021 the Minister of Hydraulics, Energy and Mines suspended the activities of Tanganyika Mining Burundi.

== Niobium, tantalum, tin and tungsten ==
In the fourth quarter of 2019 about 8,599 miners were employed in mining niobium, tantalum, tin, and tungsten in the mine sites covered by the ITRI Tin Supply Chain Initiative. niobium, tantalum, tin, and tungsten were produced by artisanal and small-scale miners. (iTSCI).

=== Artisanal mining ===
There are coltan (Note: Tantalum from coltan is used to manufacture tantalum capacitors which are used for mobile phones, personal computers, automotive electronics, and cameras.) deposits which attract artisanal miners in the Ryamukona colline, near the Mwogere River's mouth at 2.807382°S 29.606196°E. The waste water from coltan mining is dumped into the river. It contains coltan, which is extracted from the river, causing large disturbances in the river's bed and flow. In January 2017 1,077.4 kilograms (2,375 lb) of coltan were seized in Kiziba, Kabarore commune. One Burundian and eleven Rwandans were arrested as they were getting ready to cross the Mwogere River border on the way to Gisenyi, Nyaruguru district in Rwanda.

=== COMEBU ===
COMEBU (Comptoirs miniers des exploitations minières du Burundi) was granted a 25-year mining license to exploit coltan and cassiterite in the Commune of Kabarore, Kayanza Province, and cassiterite in Murehe, Kirundo Province at 2.82211°S 29.56555°E. The two concessions covered 39 square kilometres (15 sq mi). COMEBU carried out exploration work in 2003–2004 which showed proven reserves of 1,908 tonnes of coltan, probable reserves of 2,504 tonnes and possible reserves of 5,000 tonnes.

On 6 January 2022 Ibrahim Uwizeye, Minister of Hydraulics, Energy and Mines, announced that COMEBU was the only active mining company in Burundi. The activities of the other companies had been suspended. The mining policy was being reviewed, and this would be followed by the revised mining code.

== Nickel ==
Nickel laterites were found in the Musongati area in 1972 during a joint exploration program by the government of Burundi and the United Nations Development Programme (UNDP). Further exploration continued through the 1970s and 1980s. The UNDP spent about US$200 million on drilling, testwork and infrastructure development, drilling down to about 12,000 metres (39,000 ft), but had to abandon the work due to the Burundian Civil War and other conflicts in the region.

In December 2008 Samancor Nickel was granted a 3-year mining exploration permit on the perimeters of Musongati, Waga, and Nyabikere. Kermas financed all the costs of exploration and obtaining the permit to exploit the deposit. Burundi Mining Metallurgy International (BMM International) was created as a 91% subsidiary of Kermas South Africa. Exploratory drilling works were up to 25,000 metres (82,000 ft) deep. The deposit was estimated at 150 million tons.

=== Burundi Musongati Mining ===
In May 2014 the government of Burundi signed a mining exploitation agreement wirh BMM International to exploit the nickel and associated minerals that had been found near Musongati at 3.72828°S 30.09311°E A joint venture, Burundi Musongati Mining (BMM-SM), was formed. BMM International held 85% of the shares and the state of Burundi held 15% as owners of the subsoil. (Note: Burundi has signed five agreement with mining companies: Comptoirs miniers des exploitations minières du Burundi (COMEBU); Burundi Musongati Mining (BMM); Tanganyika Mining Burundi (TMB); Rainbow Mining Burundi (RBM); and African Mining Burundi.) On 3 March 2022 the government of Burundi revoked BMM International's nickel mining license by presidential decree, giving no reason.

== Rare earths ==
The Gakara rare earth site is about 20 kilometres (12 mi) south-southeast of Bujumbura. The rare earth elements are hosted in a system of narrow veins in the northeast-trending Kibaran Fold Belt consisting predominantly of bastnäsite with secondary monazite. The first JORC-compliant resource estimate in December 2018 estimated there were over 1.2 million tonnes of ore at Kiyenzi, mostly at an average grade of 22% TREO. There were 12,000 tonnes of high-grade ore in the Gasagwe, Murambi South and Gomvyi Centre deposits, graded to 55% TREO.

=== Rainbow Mining Burundi ===
In May 2011 Rainbow Rare Earths was granted a permit to explore for rare earths and associated minerals around Gakara in Bujumbura Province, 3.53404°S 29.43652°E. In April 2015 Rainbows International Resources, a wholly owned subsidiary registered in the British Virgin Islands, was granted a rare earth exploitation permit, with a 25-year mining agreement. Rainbow Mining Burundi SM was created as a subsidiary of Rainbow International Resources (90%) and the state of Burundi (10%). The state received its share as owner of the subsoil.

Open pit bench mining started at Gasagwe in September 2017 and at Murambi in Q3 2018. The processing plant was built in 2018 near the town of Kabezi about 15 kilometres (9.3 mi) south of Bujumbura between Lake Tanganyika to the west and the RN3 road to the east. The Kabezi plant did crushing and gravity separation. In August 2021 Rainbow Rare Earths announced that almost all staff had been placed on suspension.

== Peat ==
As of 2018 peat reserves in Burundi were estimated at 150 million tonnes, of which 57 million tonnes could profitably be exploited. The State-owned Office Nationale de la Tourbe (ONATOUR) is Burundi's only peat producer. ONATOUR was created by decree on 21 March 1977 with the mission of promoting and marketing peat and its derivatives to industry and agriculture.

In the years leading up to 2019 ONATOUR's production was mostly consumed by the Burundian military. In 2022 FOMI and BUCECO were buying small quantities of peat. A study on production of carbonized peat-based briquettes was completed in December 2021. The briquettes do not give off smoke, and are designed for household use as an alternative to charcoal. ONATOUR planned to obtain a machine to manufacture the briquettes, and expected no problem meeting demand given Burundi's large peat reserves.

== Sources ==
- A Bankable Feasibility Study of the Musongati Nickel Laterite Project, Republic of Burundi (PDF), BMM International, July 2011
- "Burundi / Summary", African Mining Legislation Atlas
- Burundi Updates the Mining Code, UNCTAD, 10 October 2013
- Burundi, USAID Land and Resource Governance Division
- Buzuguri, Goreth (22 June 2017), "Le MEEATU appelle au respect du code de l'eau et des règles environnementales", Radio Télévision Nationale du Burundi (in French)
- Commodity Report 2008: Tantalum (PDF), United States Geological Survey
- Decree No100/250 de 29 Decembre 2017 (PDF) (in French), Burundi
- Gahama, Pacifique (15 July 2021), Suspension provisoire des activités de la société Tanganyika Mining Burundi (in French)
- Gakara Rare Earth Project, NS Energy, 20 October 2020
- Harerimana, Egide (7 January 2022), "Une seule société minière est à l'œuvre au Burundi »", Iwacu (in French)
- Manirakiza, Fabrice; Ndabashinze, Rénovat (28 August 2023), "Nouveau code minier : Toujours un hic", Iwacu (in French)
- Matthysen, Ken (April 2015), Review of the Burundian Artisanal Gold Mining Secto (PDF), International Peace Information Service (IPIS)
- Midende, Gilbert (2009–2010), "Les exploitations minières artisanales du Burundi" (PDF), L'Afrique des Grands Lacs. Annuaire
- Misago, Jeremie (9 March 2022), "Burundi : Le permis d'exploitation de Nickel de Musongati révoqué", Iwacu
- Nininahazwe, Eddy Claude (17 September 2021), "Burundi suspends multinational mining contracts", Amjambo Africa
- Nishirimbere, Appolinaire (2 July 2021), COMMENTARY: Burundi loses billions of dollars in mining business amid COVID-19 pandemic, The East African Tax and Governance Network
- Niyongabo, Jean Marie Vianney (18 February 2022), "ONATOUR : Vers la production des briquettes carbonisées", Burundi Eco (in French)
- Niyonzima, Jean Bosco; Hendrick, Patrick (2020), "Mesures du débit de la rivière Mwogere au moulinet hydrométrique par la méthode des points de vitesse", Journal of Renewable Energies (in French), 23: 109–132, doi:10.54966/jreen.v23i1.36
- Nkurunziza, Dieudonné (13 January 2017), "1077,4 kg de coltan et cassitérite saisis à la frontière Rwando-burundaise", Radio Télévision Nationale du Burundi (in French)
- "Rainbow Rare Earths Limited Announces Update on Trial Mining Operations from the Gakara Project in Burundi", Market Screener, 5 August 2021
- Reichhardt, Friedrich; Witley, Jeremy; Hudson, Jonathan (4 June 2019), Rainbow Rare Earths Limited Gakara REE Project Burundi (PDF), The MSA Group (Pty) Ltd
- Solomons, Ilan (22 August 2014), "Significant PGM prospects at Burundi project", Mining Weekly
- Yager, Thomas R. (September 2019), The Mineral Industry of Burundi (PDF), USGS
- Yishuang Liu; Gao Ke (1 December 2018), "Le Burundi va renforcer le recours aux "expériences étrangères" sur l'intégration de la tourbe dans la fertilisation du sol", Xinhua (in French)
- Zeldin, Wendy (18 December 2013), Burundi: New Mining Code Replaces 1976 Law, US Library of Congress
