= Nyakagunda River =

River in Burundi

- Location within Burundi
- Native name: Rivière Nyakagunda (French)

Location
- Country: Burundi
- Province: Cibitoke Province

Physical characteristics
- Mouth: Ruzizi River
  - coordinates: 2.839639°S 29.062732°E

The Nyakagunda River (French: Rivière Nyakagunda) is a river in Cibitoke Province, Burundi. It is a tributary of the Ruzizi River.

== Course ==
The Nyakagunda River originates in the north of Cibitoke Province and flows west and then south to Nyeshenza. From there is flows southwest and then south to Rugombo, forming the western boundary of that city, near its mouth on the Ruziz River. Its basin lies between the basins of the Ruhwa River and the Nyamagana River. It covers 18,283 hectares (45,180 acres).

The bed of the river is formed of pebbles near the source of Nyakagunda, then sand mixed with pebbles, sand alone and finally muddy sand at the mouth, at an elevation of 773 metres (2,536 ft). The water temperature is above 20 °C (68 °F) throughout its length, with little variation.

== Environment ==
The surroundings of Nyakagunda are a mosaic of agricultural land and natural vegetation. The area is densely populated, with 331 inhabitants per square kilometer as of 2016. The average annual temperature in the area is 22 °C (72 °F). The warmest month is October, when the average temperature is 26 °C (79 °F), and the coldest is March, with 20 °C (68 °F). Average annual rainfall is 1,391 millimetres (54.8 in). The wettest month is March, with an average of 233 millimetres (9.2 in) of precipitation, and the driest is July, with 3 millimetres (0.12 in) of precipitation.

== Irrigation ==
The Nyakagunda and Nyamagana River are the two main sources of irrigation water in the Ruzizi plain of Cibitoke Province, although as of 2020 some work was being done to increase the irrigated areas using water from the Muhira River and Kaburantwa River. In 2020 water from the Nyakagunda was being channeled for 3 kilometres (1.9 mi) to irrigate experiments with different crops including 100 hectares (250 acres) of corn, 150 hectares (370 acres) of rice, as well as fields of stevia and vanilla. Drainage water from the river feeds Lake Dogodogo.

== Issues ==
In January 2020 torrential rains caused the Nyakagunda River to deviate from its bed in the Commune of Rugombo and damage irrigation infrastructure and crops of rice and banana. The irrigated area covered about 600 hectares (1,500 acres) and was farmed by 131 Sangwe cooperatives. Water was no longer reaching the irrigation canals, which needed extensive cleaning to remove particles from erosion that were deposited by the water.

By 2023 cholera had become almost chronic in the Imbo plain of Cibitoke province. In the colline of Mparambo I the water taps may be dry for a week, and the residents are forced to use water from the Nyakagunda River, which must be boiled before it is safe to drink. In September 2023 seven out of seventeen collines in the Commune of Rugombo were experiencing water shortages. People of these collines had to use dirty water from the Nyakagunda and Nyamagana rivers, which contain bacillary dysentery and cholera, as well as toxic run-off products from agriculture.

== See also ==
- List of rivers of Burundi

== Sources ==
- Bahati, Jackson (19 September 2023), Région Ouest Cibitoke/Rugombo : Pénurie d’eau. Crainte des maladies des mains sales
- Bigirimana, Raphaël (19 December 2020), Investir dans l'agriculture contribue au développement intégré du pays (P.N.Mahoromeza) (in French)
- Hicintuka, Jean-Marie (5 January 2020), Des pluies diluviennes menacent les activités agricoles des coopératives Sangwe dans le périmètre irrigué de Nyakagunda (in French), Agence Burundaise de Presse
- Mpawenayo, Balthazar (1996), Les eaux de la plaine de la Rusizi (Burundi) (PDF) (in French), Brussel: Académie royale des sciences d'outre-mer, ISBN 90-75652-01-1
- NASA Earth Observations: Population Density, NASA/SEDAC, archived from the original on 9 February 2016
- NASA Earth Observations Data Set Index, NASA, archived from the original on 28 November 2017
- NASA Earth Observations: Rainfall (1 month - TRMM), NASA/Tropical Rainfall Monitoring Mission, archived from the original on 19 April 2019
- NASA Earth Observations: Land Cover Classification, NASA/MODIS, archived from the original on 28 February 2016
- SHER Consult Ltd (December 2020), Etude de base du bassin du lac Kivu et de la rivière Rusizi/Ruzizi (PDF) (in French)
- Uwamahoro, Jean Gabriel (15 September 2023), La riposte contre le choléra : la population de Cibitoke se mobilise (in French), Unicef
- "Way: Nyakagunda River (80835489)", OpenStreetMap
