= Mumirwa natural region =

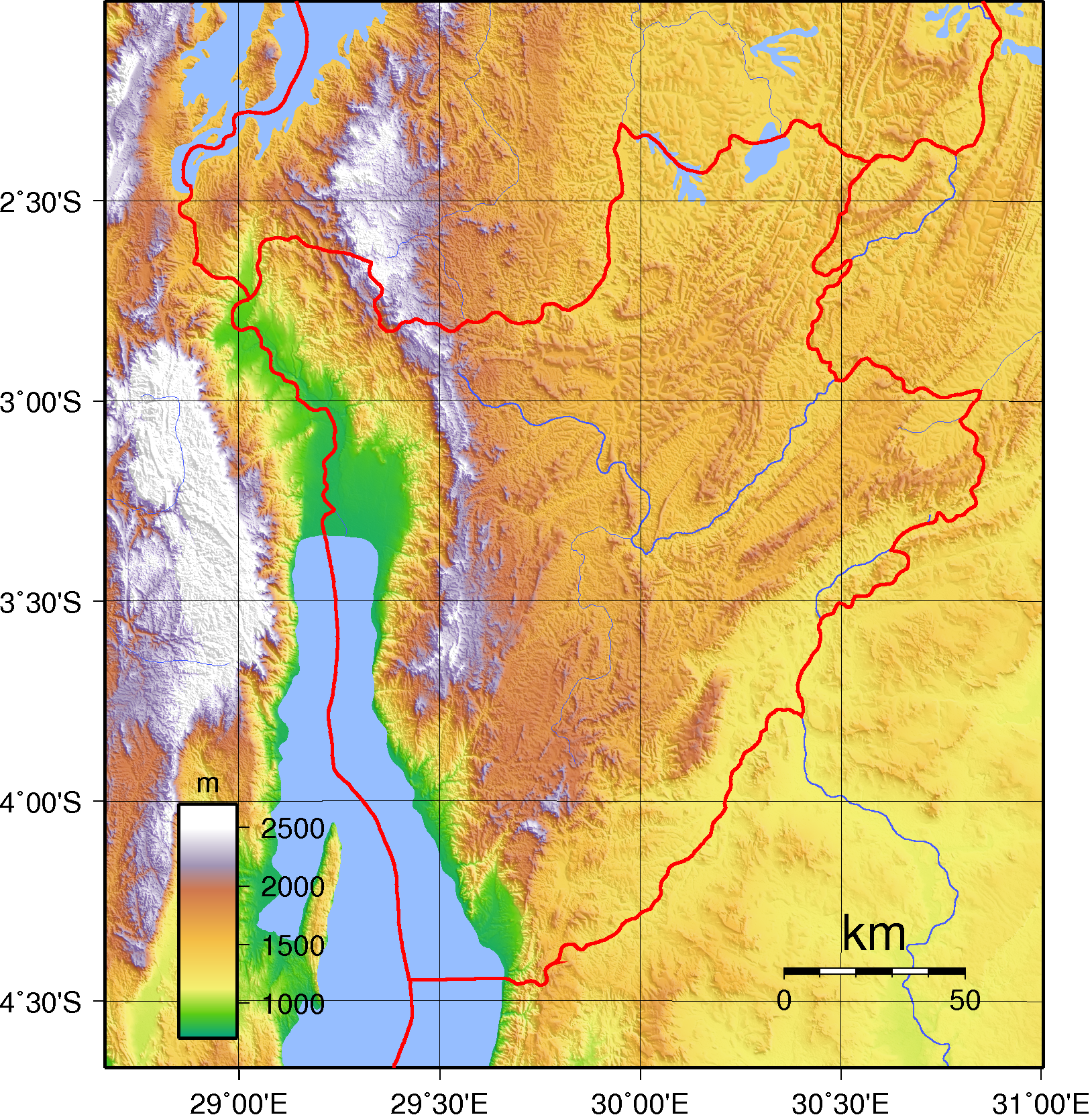
Topography of Burundi. Mumirwa region to the west of the high ridge that stretches down the country

The Mumirwa region (Région naturelle de Mumirwa) is a natural region of Burundi.

== Background ==
The Congo-Nile ridge is an immense steep slope with very rugged relief that forms the divide between the Nile and the Congo River. Mumirwa natural region covers the western foothills, or "Mirwa", of the ridge, while the Mugamba natural region contains the highest part of the ridge. The two natural regions have many common characteristics. The Mumirwa region was defined during the colonial era. Before then, Mumirwa and Imbo were one region.

== Location ==
The Mumirwa region extends from north to south through the central part of Cibitoke Province, the east of Bubanza Province and the central parts of Bujumbura Province and Bururi Province, extending into the northest of Makamba Province. The Mumirwa region is part of the western slope of the Congo–Nile Divide, above the plains along the Rusizi River and Lake Tanganyika, and below the high peaks of the divide, with altitudes of 1,000 to 1,900 metres (3,300 to 6,200 ft).

All the rivers flowing from the mountains of Burundi into the Congo Basin run through the region. These include the Rusizi River and its tributaries (Ruhwa River, Nyamagana River, Kaburantwa River, Mpanda River) and the tributaries of Lake Tanganyika (Ntahangwa River, Muha River, Kanyosha River, Mugere River, Ruzibazi River, Nyengwe River, Rwaba River).

== Climate ==
The climate is intermediate between the Imbo plain and the mountains. Temperatures are 18 to 28 °C (64 to 82 °F), averaging 20 °C (68 °F). Annual rainfall is 1,100 to 1,900 millimetres (43 to 75 in), with a dry season lasting about three months. There are deep, humus-rich soils in the floors of the valleys, while the steep slopes have poor, eroded soils.

== Sources ==
- Atlas des quatre sites Ramsar: Localisation et Resources (PDF) (in French), Ministry of Water, Environment and Urbanism, October 2014
- Irambona, Yvette (12 April 2022), Les régions naturelles du Burundi : Leur signification se fonde sur plusieurs critères (in French)
- Plan régional de mise en œuvre de la Stratégie Nationale et Plan d’Action sur la Biodiversité en zones écologiques de Mumirwa et de la crête Congo-Nil (PDF), Bujumbura: Ministère de l’Eau, de l’Environnement, de l’Aménagement du Territoire et de l’Urbanisme, November 2013
- Segamba, Léonce; Ndikumasabo, Vincent; Makinson, Carolyn; Ayad, Mohamed (1988), Enquête Démographique et de Santé au Burundi 1987 (PDF) (in French), Columbia, Maryland, USA: Ministère de l'Intérieur Département de la Population/Burundi and Institute for Resource Development/Westinghouse.
