= Nyamagana River =

River in Burundi

- Location within Burundi
- Native name: Rivière Nyamagana (French)

Location
- Country: Burundi
- Province: Cibitoke Province

Physical characteristics
- Mouth: Ruzizi River
  - coordinates: 2.93435°S 29.133044°E

The Nyamagana River (French: Rivière Nyamagana) is a river in Cibitoke Province, Burundi. It is a tributary of the Ruzizi River.

== Course ==
The Nyamagana River rises in the north of Cibitoke Province near the border with Rwanda. It flows in a generally south-southwest direction past Mabayi, Nyakiband and Mugina, then south past the east side of the city Cibitoke to its mouth on the Ruzizi River. In its upper reaches it flows through the Mumirwa natural region. Drainage water from the river feeds Lake Dogodogo.

The Nyamagana is 40 kilometres (25 mi) long, with a basin of 300 square kilometres (120 sq mi). It rises on the slopes of the Congo-Nile ridge at an altitude of around 2,000 metres (6,600 ft). The water temperature does not vary much during the year. In 1983 the pH was stable, ranging from 7.5 in February to 8.0 in August. The Nyamagana watershed has one of the highest erosion rates in the Ruzizi plain at 108 tonnes per hectare per year.

== Irrigation ==
The Nyamagana and the Nyakagunda River are the two main sources of irrigation water in the Ruzizi plain, although as of 2020 some work was being done to increase the irrigated areas using water from the Muhira River and Kaburantwa River.

Irrigation of the Imbo-nord perimeter began to be developed in 2014 with funding from the Belgian development agency Enabel. Water for the Commune of Rugombo and Commune of Mugina is taken from an intake on the Nyamagana River and distributed via a main canal and secondary and tertiary canals. In August 2022 a project underway in the Kivumvu and Kagimbu collines involved construction of an intake and a transfer canal to carry water from the Muhira River to the Nyamagana irrigation network. This would increase irrigated land in the Rugombo commune by over 250 hectares (620 acres).

== Issues ==
Gold miners use the Nyamagana, Muhira, Kaburantwa and Kagunuzi rivers in the provinces of Cibitoke, Bubanza and Kayanza to wash their products; builders extract rubble, gravel and sand for construction from the rivers; and farmers weaken their banks by failing to leave a 5 metres (16 ft) strip of uncultivated land along the banks. All this contributes to pollution of the river water and to collapse of the banks, damaging bridges, roads, buildings and other infrastructure near the rivers.

The canals in the irrigation network are regularly cleaned and their banks are stabilized and maintained. However, they are threatened by the activities of gold miners who dig holes near the main canal. Gold is mined in the river's swamp at Rugeregere in the Commune of Rugombo by cooperatives such as the Duterimbere Rugombo Mining Cooperative. Conditions are primitive, with inadequate water pumps to drain the holes. The miners have few tools and no protective equipment. The work is hard and earnings are low, since the miners have to sell their gold to middlemen.

In 2024 the colline of Murambi was threatened by landslides, and had lost 4 hectares (9.9 acres) to the Nyamagana. Tree seedlings had been planted to prevent erosion of the river banks, but had been swept away by the landslides.

In April 2024 the bridge over the Nyamagana between the Commune of Mugina and the Commune of Mabayi was destroyed by flooding. All trade between the communes came to a halt, children were forced to skip school and patients could not get care. A month later, nothing had been done to replace the bridge since the local governments could not afford the cost of a replacement.

== See also ==
- List of rivers of Burundi

== Sources ==
- Bahati, Jackson (29 April 2024), "Région Ouest/Mugina-Mabayi : Le trafic au point mort à cause du pont Nyamagana", Iwacu (in French)
- Buzuguri, Goreth (22 June 2017), "Le MEEATU appelle au respect du code de l'eau et des règles environnementales", Radio Télévision Nationale du Burundi (in French)
- Mpawenayo, Balthazar (1996), Les eaux de la plaine de la Rusizi (Burundi) (PDF) (in French), Brussel: Académie royale des sciences d'outre-mer, ISBN 90-75652-01-1
- Ndabashinze, Rénovat (20 December 2023), "Ouganda-Burundi : exploitation artisanale de l'or, une menace sanitaire et environnementale", Iwacu (in French)
- Niyongabo, Jean Marie Vianney (11 January 2024), "Communes Rugombo et Buganda : Les collines Murambi et Rusiga menacées par le phénomène de glissement de terrain", Burundi Eco
- Plan régional de mise en œuvre de la Stratégie Nationale et Plan d’Action sur la Biodiversité en zones écologiques de Mumirwa et de la crête Congo-Nil (PDF), Bujumbura: Ministère de l’Eau, de l’Environnement, de l’Aménagement du Territoire et de l’Urbanisme, November 2013
- "Relation: Nyamagana (17503876)", OpenStreetMap
- SHER Consult Ltd (December 2020), Etude de base du bassin du lac Kivu et de la rivière Rusizi/Ruzizi (PDF) (in French)
- Uwizera, Jonas Eric (3 August 2021), Programme d'Appui Institutionnel et Opérationnel au Secteur Agricole (PAIOSA) : amélioration de la compétitivité du secteur agricole (in French), Enabel
- Uwizera, Jonas Eric (24 August 2022), Programme d'Appui Institutionnel et Opérationnel au Secteur Agricole (PAIOSA) : amélioration de la compétitivité du secteur agricole (in French), Enabel
