= List of cities in Burundi =

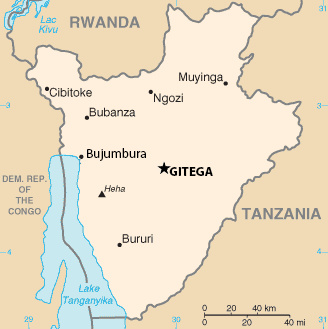
Map of Burundi

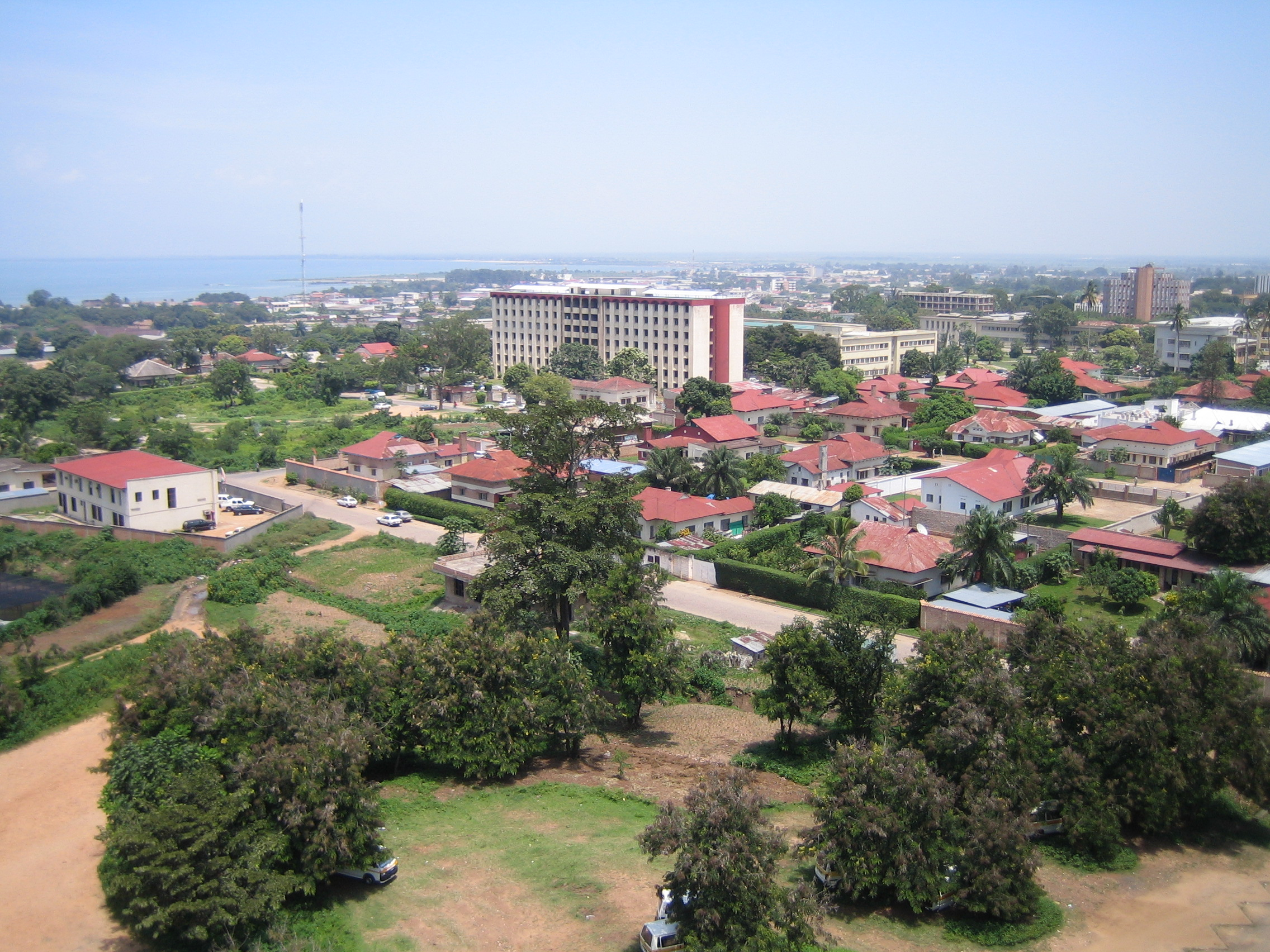
Bujumbura, former capital of Burundi

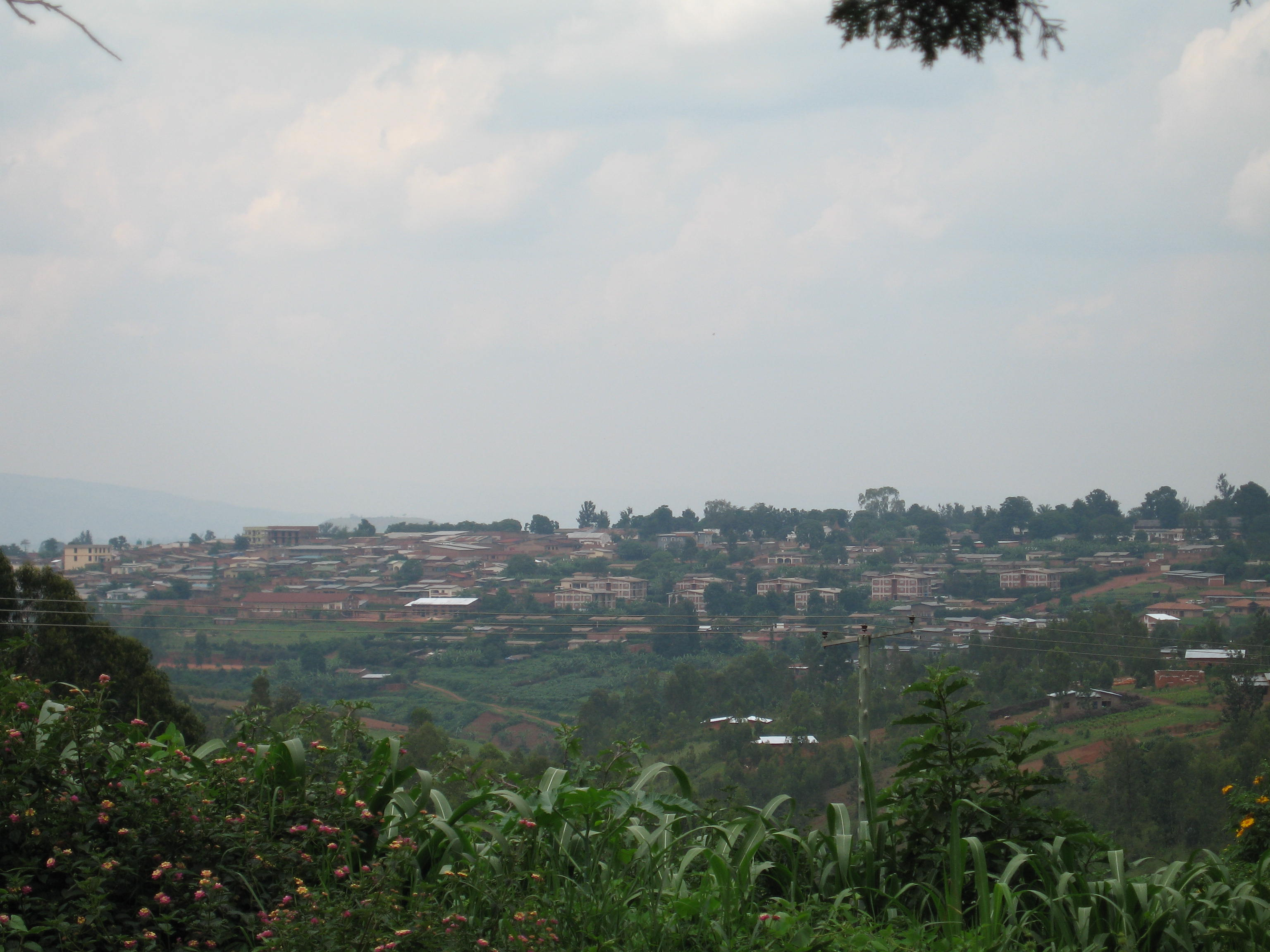
Gitega, current capital of Burundi

This is a list of cities and towns in Burundi.

- Bubanza
- Buhongo
- Bujumbura (former capital)
- Bukirasazi
- Bururi
- Cankuzo
- Cibitoke
- Gitega (current capital)
- Kabezi
- Karuzi
- Kayanza
- Kayero
- Kayogoro
- Kibondo
- Kirundo
- Kisozi
- Luhwa
- Makamba
- Magara
- Mukenke
- Muramvya
- Murore
- Musenyi
- Muyaga
- Muyinga
- Mwaro
- Ngozi
- Nyanza-Lac
- Rugari
- Rumonge
- Rutana
- Ruyigi
- Ruzunga
- Zanandore

== 10 largest cities ==
Ranking	Name	Population
1.	Bujumbura	1,124,166
2.	Gitega	125,944
3.	Muyinga	95,609
4.	Ngozi	86,844
5.	Ruyigi	77,139
6.	Kayanza	70,767
7.	Bururi	57,478
8.	Muramvya	51,458
9.	Makamba	45,396
10.	Rumonge	35,931

== See also ==
- List of cities in East Africa
