= Ruhwa =

Ruhwa may refer to any of the following:

- Ruhwa, Burundi, a border town at the border with Rwanda
- Ruhwa, Rwanda, a border town at the border with Burundi
- Ruhwa River, a tributary of the Ruzizi River; it forms part of the border between Rwanda and Burundi
