= Muhira River =

River in Burundi

- Location within Burundi
- Native name: Rivière Muhira (French)

Location
- Country: Burundi
- Province: Cibitoke Province

Physical characteristics
- Mouth: Ruzizi River
  - coordinates: 2.946185°S 29.150704°E

The Muhira River (French: Rivière Muhira) is a river in Cibitoke Province, Burundi. It is a tributary of the Ruzizi River.

== Course ==
The Muhira River basin covers 200 square kilometres (77 sq mi). The sources of the river are on the sides of the Congo-Nile ridge at an altitude of about 2,000 metres (6,600 ft). The Muhira River rises in the east of central Cibitoke Province, near the border with Rwanda. It flows in a generally east-southeast direction to the east side of the city of Cibitoke, then flows south to its mouth on the Ruzizi River.

== Environment ==
The surroundings of Muhira are a mosaic of farmland and natural vegetation. The area is densely populated, with 383 inhabitants per square kilometer as of 2016. Savannah climate prevails in the area.The average annual temperature in the area is 22 °C (72 °F). The warmest month is September, when the average temperature is 26 °C (79 °F), and the coldest is May, with 20 °C (68 °F). Average annual rainfall is 1,391 millimetres (54.8 in). The wettest month is March, with an average of 233 millimetres (9.2 in) of precipitation, and the driest is July, with 3 millimetres (0.12 in) of precipitation.

== Irrigation ==
In August 2022 an irrigation dam on the Muhira River was being rehabilitated. This would supply a regular flow of 1.6 cubic metres per second (57 cu ft/s) to over 300 hectares (740 acres) in the Murambi colline of the Commune of Buganda.

Another project underway in the Kivumvu and Kagimbu collines in August 2022 involved construction of an intake and a transfer canal to carry water from the Muhira River to the Nyamagana irrigation network. This had been built by the Institutional and Operational Support Program for the Agricultural Sector (PAIOSA) between 2017 and 2019. This would increase irrigated land in the Commune of Rugombo by over 250 hectares (620 acres).

In October 2022 Gervais Ndirakobuca, Prime Minister of Burundi, attended a meeting of communal administrators in Cibitoke. He was told that projects were underway to build identical irrigation dams on the Muhira River in the Commune of Buganda and the Commune of Rugombo. In December 2023, 180 Enabel staff members from Bujumbura planted trees on the banks of the Muhira River, where the PAIOSA had recently completed a new irrigation dam.

== Issues ==
Gold miners use the Muhira, Nyamagana, Kaburantwa and Kagunuzi rivers in the provinces of Cibitoke, Bubanza and Kayanza to wash their products; builders extract rubble, gravel and sand for construction from the rivers; and farmers weaken their banks by failing to leave a 5 metres (16 ft) strip of uncultivated land along the banks. All this contributes to pollution of the river water and to collapse of the banks, damaging bridges, roads, buildings and other infrastructure near the rivers.

Minerals in the Muhira riverbed are exploited on a large scale, which causes severe degradation of the riverbed and conflict over the use of water.

In 2011 the bridge over the Muhira River linking the Rwiri colline of the Commune of Murwi and the Rusororo colline of the Commune of Rugombo collapsed. The bridge was built by the Belgians during the colonial era, and had not been maintained. Gold miners had undermined it by digging around the bridge. Two years later it had still not been rebuilt.

In 2019 the bridge over the Muhira connecting the communes of Murwi and Rugombo was washed away when torrential rain caused the river to overflow on a large scale. Three years later, in April 2022, it had still not been replaced. Both communes were suffering from the lack of trade, which was reflected in increased prices and a drop in communal tax revenue. In July 2022 it was reported that the bridge was being rehabilitated by the people of the communes as a community development work.

== See also ==
- List of rivers of Burundi

== Sources ==
- Bahati, Jackson (7 April 2022), "Région Ouest/ Cibitoke : le pont reliant les communes Rugombo et Murwi est cassé", Iwacu (in French)
- Buzuguri, Goreth (22 June 2017), "Le MEEATU appelle au respect du code de l'eau et des règles environnementales", Radio Télévision Nationale du Burundi (in French)
- Lake Kivu and Ruzizi/Rusizi River Basin (PDF), Deutsche Gesellschaft für Internationale Zusammenarbeit, 2021
- Mpawenayo, Balthazar (1996), Les eaux de la plaine de la Rusizi (Burundi) (PDF) (in French), Brussel: Académie royale des sciences d'outre-mer, ISBN 90-75652-01-1
- Mpundunziza, Laurent (6 July 2022), Cibitoke : Le pont reliant les communes Murwi et Rugombo, en cours de réhabilitation (in French)
- NASA Earth Observations: Population Density, NASA/SEDAC, archived from the original on 9 February 2016
- NASA Earth Observations Data Set Index, NASA, archived from the original on 28 November 2017
- NASA Earth Observations: Rainfall (1 month - TRMM), NASA/Tropical Rainfall Monitoring Mission, archived from the original on 19 April 2019
- NASA Earth Observations: Land Cover Classification, NASA/MODIS, archived from the original on 28 February 2016
- Ntiyumvamabwire, Festin (25 October 2022), "Le Premier ministre à la réunion des natifs de la province de Cibitoke : Le Projet d'alimentation en eau potable à Buganda est à 80", Le Renouveau
- "Pont Muhira : son écroulement enclave deux communes", Iwacu (in French), 5 May 2013
- "Relation: Muhira (17503877)", OpenStreetMap
- Uwizera, Jonas Eric (24 August 2022), Programme d'Appui Institutionnel et Opérationnel au Secteur Agricole (PAIOSA) : amélioration de la compétitivité du secteur agricole (in French), Enabel
- Uwizera, Jonas Eric (6 December 2023), Programme d'Appui Institutionnel et Opérationnel au Secteur Agricole (PAIOSA) : amélioration de la compétitivité du secteur agricole (in French)
