= Tanganyika Mining Burundi =

- Trade name: TMB
- Industry: Gold mining
- Founded: 2017; 9 years ago
- Headquarters: Muhungu, Cibitoke Province, Burundi
- Tanganyika Gold (Burundi)

Tanganyika Mining Burundi, or TMB, is a public-private enterprise that mines gold in north-western Burundi.

== Prospecting ==
In May 2013 the company Ets Jbelli was granted a 3-year permit to prospect for gold in an area of 516.9 square kilometres (199.6 sq mi) near Mabayi in Cibitoke Province. The permit was renewed in September 2016, but in the name of the Russian company Tanganyika Gold S.A. In October 2017 Tanganyika Gold was granted a 25-year gold mining license at the Cimba site in the Commune of Mabayi, which contained an estimated 14 tonnes of gold, 36,000 tonnes of copper and 16 tonnes of silver.

== Construction and operations ==
Decree No100/250 of 29 December 2017 authorized the state of Burundi to participate in the capital of the public-private company Tanganyika Mining Burundi (TMB), charged with exploiting the gold and associated minerals from the Cimba deposit. The state would take 15% in exchange for transfer of the subsoil of the Cimba deposit, while Tanganyika Gold S.A. would take 85% in exchange for construction, development and operation of the mine, and rehabilitation of the site. (Note: Burundi has signed five agreement with mining companies: Comptoirs miniers des exploitations minières du Burundi (COMEBU); Burundi Musongati Mining (BMM); Tanganyika Gold Mining Burundi (TMB); Rainbow Mining Burundi (RBM); and African Mining Burundi.)

The President of Burundi inaugurated the Cimba gold mining site on 31 October 2017. In July 2018 Côme Manirakiza, Minister of Mining, announced that the land should be cleared by the end of July, machines would be imported in August and installation would be completed in November. Production would start in December 2018.

Companies wholly or partially owned by the state that were reporting negative results in 2021 included Hôtel Source du Nil, Onatel, Cogerco, Tanganyika Mining Burundi, Regideso, Socabu and Sodeco.

== Suspension ==
On 19 May 2021 residents of the land affected by the Tanganyika Mining Company barricaded the roads leading to the mining sites to demand compensation for exploitation of their lands. They were backed by the local administration. In July 2021 Evariste Ndayishimiye, President of Burundi, decided to suspend and renegotiate all foreign mining contracts in Burundi. On 15 July 2021 the Minister of Hydraulics, Energy and Mines temporarily suspended the activities of Tanganyika Mining Burundi. The ministry noted there had been many violations of the mining code. There had been irregularities in compensation, mining, processing the ore, mitigation and rehabilitation. As of November 2022 no compensation had been given to the 120 families whose land had been damaged by the mining. Artisanal miners had been forbidden from continuing their activity, and were unemployed.

On 30 December 2022 Evariste Ndayishimiye, President of Burundi, said that the wealth of the subsoil only had only benefitted a handful of people instead of contributing to the economic recovery of the country. The government had therefore taken measures to improve regulation of the mining sector. Artisanal gold mining cooperatives had been allowed to resume, but in six months had only produced about 40 kilograms (88 lb) of gold. Those that produced less than 1 kilogram (2.2 lb) had been suspended again. The cooperatives had to sign a contract with the Ministry of Mines, sell the gold directly to the Central Bank and give 30% of the production to the state.

== See also ==
- List of companies of Burundi
- Mining industry of Burundi

== Sources ==
- "Burundi : la production du site d'or de Cimba débutera en décembre 2018", Arib News (in French), 17 July 2018
- Burundi suspends multinational mining contracts, Land Portal, 17 September 2021
- "Cacophonie dans l'exploitation de l'or de Mabayi", Radio Publique Africaine (in French), 16 November 2022
- Decree No100/250 de 29 Decembre 2017 (PDF) (in French), Burundi
- Gahama, Pacifique (15 July 2021), Suspension provisoire des activités de la société Tanganyika Mining Burundi (in French)
- Maniragaba, Mélance (9 January 2023), "Le secteur minier toujours improductif", Burundi Eco (in French)
- Nishirimbere, Appolinaire (2 July 2021), COMMENTARY: Burundi loses billions of dollars in mining business amid COVID-19 pandemic, The East African Tax and Governance Network
- Niyongabo, Jean Marie Vianney (7 January 2022), "L'Onatel, pourra-t-il ressusciter un jour ?", Burundi Eco (in French)
