= Ndava =

Ndava may refer to several settlements in Burundi:

- Ndava, Bubanza
- Ndava, Bururi, Commune of Bururi
