= Koko River (Rusizi District) =

Location
- Country: Rwanda

Physical characteristics
- Mouth
  - coordinates: 2.610048°S 29.186624°E

Basin features
- River system: Rusizi River
- Tributaries
  - left: Shyara River

The Koko River is a river in the Rusizi District of southwestern Rwanda that is a right-hand tributary of the Ruhwa River, which forms the boundary between the western regions of Rwanda and Burundi. For most of its length it runs through the Nyungwe National Park.
