= Ruhwa, Burundi =

- Location in Burundi
- Coordinates: 02°43′51″S 29°02′31″E
- Country: Burundi
- Prefecture: Cibitoke Province
- Commune: Commune of Rugombo

Ruhwa (also spelt alternatively as Luhwa, Ruwa, or Luwa) is a town in north-western Burundi.

== Location ==
The town is located in the Commune of Rugombo, in Cibitoke Province, in north-western Burundi, at the international border with the Republic of Rwanda. The coordinates of Ruhwa, Burundi are:2°43'51.0"S, 29°02'31.0"E (Latitude:-2.730833; Longitude:29.041944).

== Population ==
The population of Ruhwa, Burundi is not publicly known as of August 2014.

== Points of interest ==
The most important point of interest is the international border crossing between Burundi and Rwanda, along Highway RN5. The border crossing maintains a one-stop border stop.

== See also ==
- Cibitoke
- Bujumbura
- Bukavu
- Lake Kivu
- Ruhwa, Rwanda
