= Kagunuzi River =

River in Burundi

- Location within Burundi
- Native name: French: Rivière Kagunuzi

Location
- Country: Burundi
- Province: Bubanza Province, Cibitoke Province

Physical characteristics
- Mouth: Ruzizi River,
  - coordinates: 3.04397°S 29.24643°E

The Kagunuzi River is a river in northwestern Burundi.

== Course ==
The Gitenge River forms above the Lake Rwegura in the Parc national de la Kibira. It flows west-southwest between Cibitoke Province to the north and Bubanza Province to the south, and joins the Kagunuzi, which continues along the provincial border. The combined river enters the Ruzizi River to the sought of Ndava, Cibitoke.

== Watershed ==
The Kagunuzi watershed covers about 425 square kilometres (164 sq mi). Elevations range from 2,661 to 788 metres (8,730 to 2,585 ft). Monthly average rainfall varies by region from 74 to 137 millimetres (2.9 to 5.4 in). As of 2020 the Kagunuzi basin had 1,992 hectares (4,920 acres) of irrigated land.

== Environment ==
The surroundings of the Kagunizi are a mosaic of agricultural land and natural vegetation. The area is densely populated, with 319 inhabitants per square kilometer as of 2016. Savannah climate prevails in the area. The average annual temperature in the area is 23 °C (73 °F). The warmest month is August, when the average temperature is 26 °C (79 °F), and the coldest is January, with 21 °C (70 °F). Average annual rainfall is 1,086 millimetres (42.8 in). The wettest month is December, with an average of 154 millimetres (6.1 in) of precipitation, and the driest is July, with 3 millimetres (0.12 in) of precipitation.

== Hydroelectricity ==
The Gitenge–Kagunuzi River and the Kaburantwa River are important tributaries on the east side of the Ruzizi river, with an estimated total hydroelectric potential of about 100 MW. The Rwegura Hydroelectric Power Station in the Kagunuzi basin has a capacity of 19 MW. A site downstream on the Kagunuzi has potential of 26 MW.

In May 2015 it was announced that construction of the Kagu 006 hydroelectric plant would soon start. The 12 MW plant would product 45-50 GWh of energy per year. Funding of US$60 million would be provided by the European Union, World Bank, African Development Bank, the Republic of China, the Netherlands, the United Nations Development Program, and the European Investment Bank. After a pause in foreign investment due to political issues, by 2022 the 6 MW Kagu 006 hydropower project in Cibitoke Province was in the Preliminary Study stage.

== Issues ==
Gold miners use the Nyamagana, Muhira, Kaburantwa and Kagunuzi rivers in the provinces of Cibitoke, Bubanza and Kayanza to wash their products; builders extract rubble, gravel and sand for construction from the rivers; and farmers weaken their banks by failing to leave a 5 metres (16 ft) strip of uncultivated land along the banks. All this contributes to pollution of the river water and to collapse of the banks, damaging bridges, roads, buildings and other infrastructure near the rivers.

== See also ==
- List of rivers of Burundi

== Sources ==
- Buzuguri, Goreth (22 June 2017), "Le MEEATU appelle au respect du code de l'eau et des règles environnementales", Radio Télévision Nationale du Burundi (in French)
- Goffin, M (December 2020), Baseline Study for the basin of Lake Kivu and the Rusizi/Ruzizi River (PDF), SHER Consult
- Republic of Burundi Energy sector rehabilitation project (PDF), World Bank, 14 February 1991
- Sibomana, Alexis; Gangadhara Bhatt, H; Havyarimana, Vincent (2018), "Morphometric analysis of Kagunuzi sub-basin in Kibira national park north-western part of Burundi using geospatial techniques"" (PDF), International Journal of Development Research, 8 (2): 19165–19173
- NASA Earth Observations: Population Density, NASA/SEDAC, archived from the original on 9 February 2016
- NASA Earth Observations Data Set Index, NASA, archived from the original on 28 November 2017 Temperature data from satellite measurements of the earth's surface temperature within a box that is 0,1×0,1 grader.
- NASA Earth Observations: Rainfall (1 month - TRMM), NASA/Tropical Rainfall Monitoring Mission, archived from the original on 19 April 2019 Average value for the years 2012–2014 within a box that is0,1×0,1 grader.
- NASA Earth Observations: Land Cover Classification, NASA/MODIS, archived from the original on 28 February 2016
- "US$ 60M Hydroelectric Power plant For Burundi", Constructionreview, 19 May 2015
- "Way: Kagunizi (313713953)", OpenStreetMap
- World Small Hydropower Development Report 2022 Eastern Africa (PDF), United Nations Industrial Development Organization, 2022, ISSN 2706-7599
