= International Electricity Company of the Great Lakes Countries =

- Trade name: SINELAC
- Native name: Société Internationale d’Electricité des Pays des Grands Lacs
- Type: State owned
- Industry: Electricity generation
- Founded: June 22, 1962; 64 years ago
- Headquarters: Bukavu, Democratic Republic of the Congo
- Headquarters in Bukavu
- Website: sinelac.org

The International Electricity Company of the Great Lakes Countries (French: Société Internationale d’Electricité des Pays des Grands Lacs, SINELAC) supplies electricity to Burundi, Rwanda and the Democratic Republic of the Congo.

== Purpose ==
SINELAC is an organization of the Economic Community of the Great Lakes Countries (CEPGL), with its head office in Bukavu, the Democratic Republic of Congo. It was created in 1983 by an agreement between the three CEPGL countries for the purpose of operating the Ruzizi II Hydroelectric Power Station and marketing the energy produced to the national electricity companies of the three member countries: REGIDESO Burundi, Société Nationale d'Électricité in the Democratic Republic of Congo and Energy Utility Corporation Limited in Rwanda.

The Ruzizi II Hydroelectric Power Plant is on the Rusizi River between Rwanda and the DRC. It was built between 1983 and 1988. Construction was funded through development credit agreements between the member countries and the International Development Association, under which each country assigned the funding received to SINELAC, which would undertake the project. Ruzizi II delivers a maximum of 44 MW, and has potential annual production of 200 GWH. Between 1991 and 2001 SINELAC provided, on average, 45% of Rwanda's electricity, 17% of Burundi's electricity and 21% of the DRC's electricity.

== Sources ==
- Development Credit Agreement (Ruzizi II Regional Hydroelectric Power Project) (PDF), International Development Association, 4 April 1984
- Historique (in French), SINELAC, 1 May 2023
- La Communaute Economique des Pays des Grands Lacs, Government of the Republic of Rwanda
- Regional Programme of Action for Economic Development and Regional Integration (PDF), International Conference on the Great Lakes Region, June 2006
