= Odette Ntahonvukiye =

Burundian judoka

Odette Ntahomvukiye (born 14 July 1994 in Cibitoke, Burundi) is a Burundian judoka. She competed at the 2012 Summer Olympics in the -78 kg event, exiting in the first round.
