= Pont Ruzizi II =

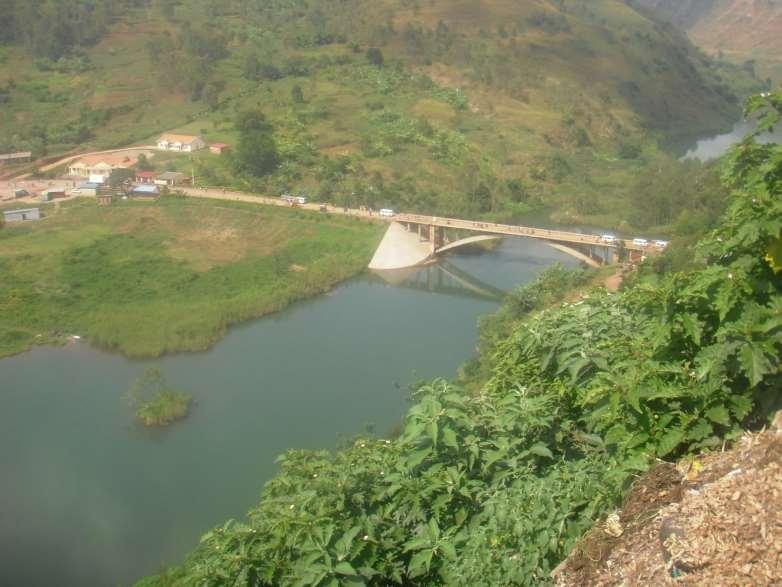
- Pont Ruzizi II
- Coordinates: 02°30′55″S 28°52′04″E
- Carries: Motor vehicles, heavy weight
- Crosses: Ruzizi River
- Locale: Bukavu, Democratic Republic of Congo
- Official name: None
- Next downstream: Pont frontalier

Characteristics
- Material: Reinforced concrete, metal
- Total length: 88 m (289 ft)
- Width: 10 m (33 ft)
- Clearance below: 23.2 m (76 ft)

History
- Construction start: 1908
- Construction end: 1920

Location
- Interactive map of Pont Ruzizi II

The Pont Ruzizi II is one of bridges in Bukavu which serves as one of the borders customs between Democratic Republic of Congo in the town of Bukavu and Rwanda in the Cyimbogo region over the Ruzizi River.

This bridge is located at the rear of the mountain housing the Saio military camp, built in 1943 after the Congolese army's victory in Ethiopia over the Italian East Africa on 8 June 1941 during the Second World War. The bridge was then built to allow trade between the German empire's Ruanda-Urundi and Belgian Congo, whose works lasted 12 years from 1908 to 1920.

The bridge, 88 m (289 ft) long, is the longest bridge in Bukavu city, located 20 km (12 mi) from Pont Ruzizi I, which also serves as the customs border with Rwanda at Cangungu.

== See also ==
- Ruzizi River
- Pont Ruzizi I
