= Comptoirs miniers des exploitations minières du Burundi =

Private enterprise

- Trade name: COMEBU
- Industry: Mining
- Founded: 1987; 39 years ago
- Headquarters: Burundi
- Kabarore site (Burundi)

Comptoirs miniers des exploitations minières du Burundi, or COMEBU, is a private enterprise that mines coltan and other minerals.

== History ==
The Comptoir Minier des Exploitations du Burundi S.A. (Burundi Mining Exchange, COMEBU) is privately owned. COMEBU was granted a 25-year mining license to exploit coltan and cassiterite in the Commune of Kabarore, Kayanza Province, and cassiterite in Murehe, Kirundo Province. The two concessions covered 39 square kilometres (15 sq mi). (Note: Burundi has signed five agreement with mining companies: Comptoirs miniers des exploitations minières du Burundi (COMEBU); Burundi Musongati Mining (BMM); Tanganyika Mining Burundi (TMB); Rainbow Mining Burundi (RBM); and African Mining Burundi.)

COMEBU carried out exploration work in 2003–2004 which showed proven reserves of 1,908 tonnes of coltan, probable reserves of 2,504 tonnes and possible reserves of 5,000 tonnes. Based on this, the company committed to exporting 10,000 kg/month of coltan concentrate for 25 years. By 2010 the official quantity had dropped to about 500 kilograms (1,100 lb) per month, or 6 tonnes per year.

As of 2010 there were many artisanal miners extracting coltan/cassiterite illegally. They were supposed to work for COMEBU, but it gave them very low prices compared to unofficial traders. Officially COMEBU employed 700 miners, but the true figure was about 2,000, including women and children who washed the ores, and carried washing water and ores. Almost all the coltran produced by artisanal miners, whether employed by COMEBU or not, was being sold clandestinely. Coltan production was perhaps 10 to 15 tonnes per month, half of which was sold directly in Rwanda and the other half transported to Rwanda via Bujumbura.

Between 1987 and 2016 COMEBU had 200 employees in Kabarore and could only exploit 400 kilograms (880 lb) a month, or 4.8 tonnes per year. The local people organized the mineral exploitation company (BME) in 2016 as a subcontractor to COMEBU, and as of 2022 was producing 30 tonnes per month or 360 tonnes per year with over 4,000 employees. The company was experiencing some loss through smuggling of minerals to Rwanda.

On 6 January 2022 Ibrahim Uwizeye, Minister of Hydraulics, Energy and Mines, announced that COMEBU was the only active mining company in Burundi. The activities of the other companies had been suspended. The mining policy was being reviewed, and this would be followed by the revised mining code. On 3 December 2022 Evariste Ndayishimiye, President of Burundi, spoke in Kayanza. He accused François Uwiragiye, an investor in the mining sector, of enriching himself at the expense of the people.

Iwacu journalists visited Kabarore in May 2023. They described the communal headquarters as a small village with tin houses dominated by banana trees. The Kivuvu mining site was over 10 kilometres (6.2 mi) away, guarded by soldiers. Large machines were excavating the open cast coltan mine, while miners were working with picks and shovels at the foot of the pit. They were barefoot and had no gloves or masks, although some wore helmets. The ore was crushed and ground manually and concentrated by gravity in water tanks or holes.

== See also ==
- List of companies of Burundi
- Mining industry of Burundi

== Sources ==
- Gahama, Pacifique (22 September 2022), "La production des minerais augmente de façon exponentielle à Kabarore", Le Journal Africa (in French)
- Harerimana, Egide (7 January 2022), "Une seule société minière est à l'œuvre au Burundi »", Iwacu (in French)
- Manirakiza, Fabrice; Ndabashinze, Rénovat (9 June 2023), "Le coltan, une manne que pour certains", Iwacu (in French)
- Midende, Gilbert (2009–2010), "Les exploitations minières artisanales du Burundi" (PDF), L'Afrique des Grands Lacs. Annuaire
- Nishirimbere, Appolinaire (2 July 2021), COMMENTARY: Burundi loses billions of dollars in mining business amid COVID-19 pandemic, The East African Tax and Governance Network
- Yager, Thomas R. (September 2010), The Mineral Industry of Burundi (PDF), U.S. Department of the Interior / U.S. Geological Survey
