= Rainbow Mining Burundi =

- Industry: Mining
- Founded: 2015; 11 years ago
- Defunct: 2021
- Headquarters: Burundi
- Products: Rare earth concentrate
- Gakara site (Burundi)

Rainbow Mining Burundi was a public-private enterprise that mined rare earth deposits near Bujumbura, Burundi. It was forced to halt operations in 2021 while the government renegotiated the profit-sharing arrangement.

== Deposit ==
The Gakara rare earth site is about 20 kilometres (12 mi) south-southeast of Bujumbura. The rare earth elements are hosted in a system of narrow veins in the northeast-trending Kibaran Fold Belt consisting predominantly of bastnäsite with secondary monazite. The first JORC-compliant resource estimate in December 2018 estimated there were over 1.2 million tonnes of ore at Kiyenzi, mostly at an average grade of 22% TREO. There were 12,000 tonnes of high-grade ore in the Gasagwe, Murambi South and Gomvyi Centre deposits, graded to 55% TREO.

The Gakara deposit has a high percentage of magnet rare earths such as neodymium and praseodymium, used in motors, generators, wind turbines, and electric vehicles. These account for 19% by volume but over 80% by value. The quality of the ore is the highest in the world.

== Exploration and exploitation license ==
Rainbow Rare Earths is a company registered in Guernsey. It is part of Pella Resources, a group of mining companies that operate across Africa. In May 2011 Rainbow was granted a permit to explore for rare earths and associated minerals around Gakara in Bujumbura Province. In April 2015 Rainbows International Resources, a wholly owned subsidiary registered in the British Virgin Islands, was granted a rare earth exploitation permit, with a 25-year mining agreement.

Rainbow Mining Burundi SM was created as a subsidiary of Rainbow International Resources (90%) and the state of Burundi (10%). The state received its share as owner of the subsoil. (Note: Burundi has signed five agreement with mining companies: Comptoirs miniers des exploitations minières du Burundi (COMEBU); Burundi Musongati Mining (BMM); Tanganyika Mining Burundi (TMB); Rainbow Mining Burundi (RBM); and African Mining Burundi.) The license covers about 39 square kilometres (15 sq mi) The base camp is in the village of Matambu, Commune of Gasenyi.

== Processing and distribution ==
The processing plant was built in 2018 near the town of Kabezi about 15 kilometres (9.3 mi) south of Bujumbura between Lake Tanganyika to the west and the RN3 road to the east. The Kabezi plant did crushing and gravity separation. It produced high-grade REE concentrate with an average of 58.3% TREO. The concentrate was initially exported by road to the port of Mombasa, Kenya. As of 2021 the concentrate was transported by truck to Dar es Salaam, and from there taken by ship to China. One truck can carry 25 tonnes, so even at target volumes of 5,000 tonnes annually this would not be an issue.

Thyssenkrupp Materials Trading made a 10-year distribution and offtake agreement with Rainbow for up to 10,000 tonnes of rare earth concentrate, starting in January 2018. Extracting rare earths from concentrate is a complex process which uses a lot of energy, and the waste can cause environmental problems. The only rare earth processing plants are in China, and they processed the rare earth concentrate for ThyssenKrupp, who then distributed the product.

== Operations ==
Open pit bench mining started at Gasagwe in September 2017 and at Murambi in Q3 2018. As of 30 June 2018 the company had exported 575 tonnes of rare earth concentrate at an everage TREO of 58%, and had sold 476 tonnes at US$2,263 per tonne.

A July 2019 report by SRK Consulting addressed concerns about pricing of rare earth mineral concentrate. The report had been commissioned by the World Bank at the request of the government, and was accepted by the government in 2020. The value of the concentrate is calculated as the final value of the rare earths, minus the transport costs and processing costs. It was agreed that the government should receive 4% of the value of the rare earths.

Rainbow Mining Burundi exported 350 tonnes in 2019 and 500 tonnes in 2020. The target was to export 5,000 tonnes per year. As of 2021 Rainbow Mining Burundi had invested US$6 million, and had more than 250 permanent employees.

== Closure ==
In April 2021 the Ministry of Hydraulics, Energy and Mines notified Rainbow Rare Earths that permission to export concentrate had been temporarily suspended. The company said they would continue exploration, trial mining and processing while the issue was resolved. Alain Guillaume Bunyoni, Prime Minister of Burundi, told parliament that Burundi had gained nothing from mining contracts with foreign multnationals. He said, "Many of these companies have now received formal suspension notices because we realized that they were there only to plunder our mineral wealth. They have duped the government through the conventions that govern their operations – thus the need to renegotiate."

Dr. Gilbert Midende, managing director of Rainbow Mining Burundi, retired for health reasons on 1 May 2021. Midende was a trained geologist who had been Minister of Mines from 1988 to 1993.

In a speech on Burundi's independence day on 1 July 2021 Evariste Ndayishimiye, President of Burundi, stated that foreign companies were making excessive profits from mining resources such as nickel, rare earth, gold, and coltan. He ordered that all foreign companies suspend their mining activities as of 14 July 2021. In August 2021 Rainbow Rare Earths announced that almost all staff had been placed on suspension. Given the lower return available from Gakara compared to other projects, no further investments were made. Gakara was fully written down, with net assets impaired to nil, in Rainbow Rare Earth's accounts for the year to 30 June 2023.

Gabriel Rufyiri, president of the anti-corruption NGO Olucome, said the mining code was flawed. The state did not know how much income was made from sale of the raw materials that were exported. He also blamed the government representatives who negotiated and monitored the contracts, who he said should be prosecuted.

== See also ==
- List of companies of Burundi
- Mining industry of Burundi

== Sources ==
- Annual Report & Accounts for the year ended 30 June 2018 (PDF), Rainbow Rare Earths Limited
- Gakara Rare Earth Project, NS Energy, 20 October 2020
- Interim Results for the six months ended 31 December 2023, Rainbow Rare Earths, 28 March 2024
- Maniragaba, Mélance (26 February 2021), "Comment exploite-t-on les terres rares ?", Burundi Eco (in French)
- Nininahazwe, Eddy Claude (17 September 2021), "Burundi suspends multinational mining contracts", Amjambo Africa
- Nishirimbere, Appolinaire (2 July 2021), COMMENTARY: Burundi loses billions of dollars in mining business amid COVID-19 pandemic, The East African Tax and Governance Network
- "Rainbow Rare Earths Limited Announces Update on Trial Mining Operations from the Gakara Project in Burundi", Market Screener, 5 August 2021
- "Rainbow Rare Earths (RBW.L) Market Update", Share Talk, 14 April 2021
- "Rainbow Rare Earths Restarts Operations in Burundi", Flagstaff, 17 May 2021
- Reichhardt, Friedrich; Witley, Jeremy; Hudson, Jonathan (4 June 2019), Rainbow Rare Earths Limited Gakara REE Project Burundi (PDF), The MSA Group (Pty) Ltd
- Yikeze, Alphonse (20 July 2021), "Gitega et Rainbow mining Burundi en terrain miné", Iwacu (in French)
