= Nyengwe River =

River in Burundi

- Location within Burundi
- Native name: Rivière Nyengwe (French)

Location
- Country: Burundi
- Province: Bururi Province, Makamba Province

Physical characteristics
- Source
  - coordinates: 4.067274°S 29.670912°E
- Mouth: Lake Tanganyika
  - coordinates: 4.192983°S 29.53756°E

The Nyengwe River (French: Rivière Nyengwe) is a river in Rumonge Province, Burundi, that flows into Lake Tanganyika.

== Course ==
The north of the Nyengwe River defines the southern boundary of the Vyanda Forest Nature Reserve. The upper section of the river flows through the Mumirwa natural region. The river rises to the east of Gahago on the border between Bururi Province and Makamba Province and flows southeast along this border, and then along the border between Rumonge Province and Makamba Province. It passes under the RN3 coastal highway at Rimbo, and flows through an oil palm plantation to its mouth on Lake Tanganyika.

== Flooding ==
A hydrological station was installed on the Nyengwe at Rimbo in October 1979. It has changed its location many times after being destroyed by floods. As of 2022 it was just downstream of the abutment of the old bridge, on the right bank, about 20 metres (66 ft) upstream of the current bridge on the Rumonge-Nyanza-Lac road. In May 2019 the Nyengwe River overflowed in the Rimbo colline and destroyed 28 houses.

== Oil palms ==
There are many palm oil processing units along the Nyengwe river. Most units do not have the capacity to treat waste properly, and dump the untreated waste into the river at night or through underground pipes. This pollutes Lake Tanganyika and reduces the fish catch.

== Hydroelectricity ==
The National Development Plan 2018–2027 for Burundi included development of an 8MW Nyengwe Hydroelectric Power Station in three cascades: Nyen006, Nyen010 and Nyen028.

== See also ==
- List of rivers of Burundi

== Sources ==
- "28 maisons détruites suite au débordement de la rivière Nyengwe", AGnews (in French), 2 May 2019
- Annuaire Hydrologique 2021-2022 (PDF) (in French), Ministère de l’Environnement, de l’Agriculture et de l’Elevage
- Decret n°100/007 du 25 Janvier 2000 portant delimitation d’un parc national et de quatre reserves naturelles (PDF) (in French), Republique du Burundi cabinet du president, 5 January 2000
- Nzorubonanya, Felix (11 October 2019), "Rumonge : la pollution des eaux du lac Tanganyika continue", Burundi Eco (in French)
- Plan national de developpement du Burundi 2018-2027 (PDF) (in French), Burundi, June 2018
- Plan régional de mise en œuvre de la Stratégie Nationale et Plan d’Action sur la Biodiversité en zones écologiques de Mumirwa et de la crête Congo-Nil (PDF) (in French), Bujumbura: : Ministère de l’Eau, de l’Environnement, de l’Aménagement du Territoire et de l’Urbanisme, November 2013
- "Way: Nyengwe (151557167)", OpenStreetMap
