= Rubyiro River =

Location
- Country: Rwanda

Physical characteristics
- Mouth
  - coordinates: 2.731042°S 29.032976°E

Basin features
- River system: Rusizi River
- Tributaries
  - left: Murundo River
  - right: Nyamabuye River, Kabaya River, Katabuvuga River

The Rubyiro River is a river in southwestern Rwanda that is a left-hand tributary of the Ruzizi River. It joins the Ruzizi, which forms the boundary between Rwanda and the Democratic Republic of the Congo, about 2 kilometres (1.2 mi) above the point where the Ruhwa River, which forms the boundary between Rwanda and Burundi, enters the Ruzizi.
