= African Mining Burundi =

Public–private partnership

- Industry: Mining
- Founded: 2018; 8 years ago
- Defunct: 2021
- Headquarters: Burundi
- Butihinda site (Burundi)

African Mining Burundi was a public–private partnership that mined gold and other minerals in Burundi.

== Background ==
The Muhwazi perimeter ln the Commune of Butihinda, Muyinga Province, was explored by Flemish Investments Limited and Burundi Mining Company (BUMINCO). Both companies withdrew, and after 9 months of research, BUMINCO applied for an exploitation permit on the Masaka perimeter. On 21 August 2017, the British company African Mining Limited obtained an exploration permit for gold and associated minerals on the Muhwazi perimeter.

== History ==
On 8 August 2018 African Mining Burundi was established as an 85% subsidiary of African Mining Limited, with the state holding 15%. (Note: Burundi has signed five agreement with mining companies: Comptoirs miniers des exploitations minières du Burundi (COMEBU); Burundi Musongati Mining (BMM); Tanganyika Mining Burundi (TMB); Rainbow Mining Burundi (RBM); and African Mining Burundi.) The new company was licensed to exploit the gold deposit in Masaka and in nine other identified mining sites.

On 8 October 2018 Pierre Nkurunziza, President of Burundi, attended the official launch of industrial mining activities by African Mining Burundi on the Masaka I site. Presidential decree no 100/191 of 18 December 2019 named Simon Ngendakumana as administrator representing the state on the board of directors of African Mining Limited.

The gold processing plant was built in the Masaka colline of Butihinda Commune. The director general of the Office Burundais des Mines et Carrieres (OBM) visited this site on 29 July 2020 to see the progress of construction work on the gold processing plant, and to talk with the operators.

== Closure ==
In a speech on Burundi's independence day on 1 July 2021 Evariste Ndayishimiye, President of Burundi, stated that foreign companies were making excessive profits from mining resources such as nickel, rare earth, gold, and coltan. He ordered that all foreign companies suspend their mining activities as of 14 July 2021. On 15 June 2022 the Council of Ministers met under the chairmanship of President Evariste Ndayishimiye. The Minister of Hydraulics, Energy and Mines spoke about the progress of artisanal mining in the areas granted to Tanganyika Mining Burundi and African Mining Burundi.

== See also ==
- List of companies of Burundi
- Mining industry of Burundi

== Sources ==
- Décret n°100/191 du 18 décembre 2019 nomination d’un Administrateur Représentant l’Etat du Burundi au Conseil d’Administration de la Société Mixte African Mining Burundi Limited, chargée de l’exploitation de l’or et minerais associés de Masaka en Commune Butihinda (in French)
- Hakizimana, Placide (8 October 2018), "African Mining Burundi commence ses activités d'exploitation des mines", Radio Télévision Nationale du Burundi (in French)
- Nininahazwe, Eddy Claude (17 September 2021), "Burundi suspends multinational mining contracts", Amjambo Africa
- Nishirimbere, Appolinaire (2 July 2021), COMMENTARY: Burundi loses billions of dollars in mining business amid COVID-19 pandemic, The East African Tax and Governance Network
- Ntahorwamiye, Prosper (23 October 2022), "Présidence de la République : Communiqué de presse n° 11 de la réunion du Conseil des ministres", Le Renouveau
- Visite du DG de l’OBM à la Société African Mining Burundi (in French), OBM
