= Ruzizi III Hydroelectric Power Station =

Proposed hydropower plant in Rwanda

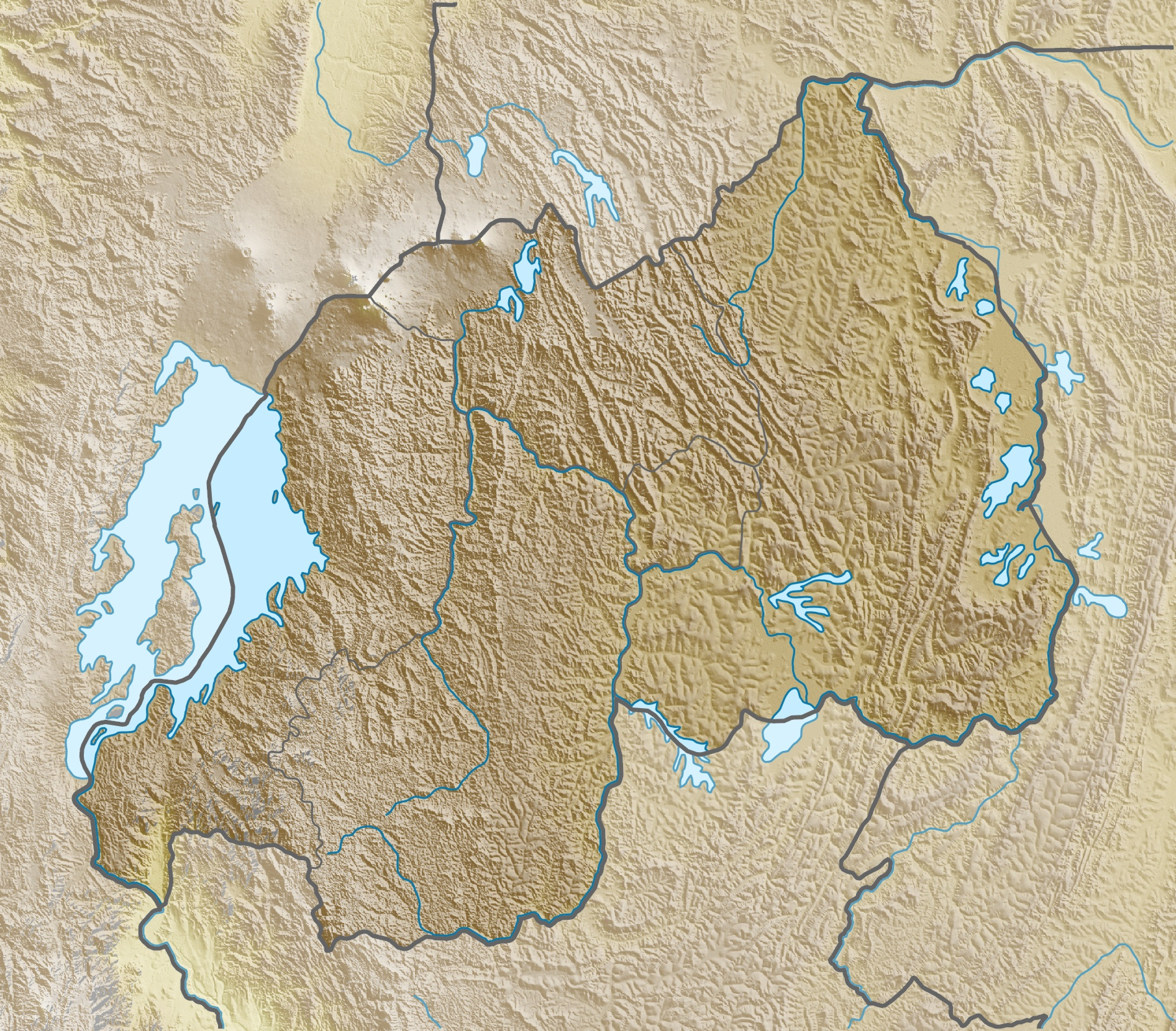
- Map of Rwanda showing the location of Ruzizi III Hydroelectric Power Station
- Coordinates: 02°42′05″S 28°57′56″E
- Status: Proposed

Dam and spillways
- Impounds: Ruzizi River

Power Station
- Commission date: 2026 (expected)
- Type: Run-of-the-river
- Installed capacity: 206 MW (203 MW + 3 MW)
- Annual generation: 1,157 GWh

Ruzizi III Hydroelectric Power Station is a proposed hydropower plant with planned capacity installation of 206 MW when completed.

== Location ==
The power station is located on Ruzizi River, straddling the common border between Rwanda and the Democratic Republic of the Congo (DRC). Its location is approximately 5 kilometres (3 mi) directly west of the town of Bugarama, in Rusizi District, in Rwanda's Western Province, approximately 280 kilometres (174 mi), southwest of Kigali, the capital city of that country. The approximate coordinates of Ruzizi III Power Station are:

== Overview ==
This power station is the third in a cascade of power stations on the Ruzizi River, benefiting the countries of Burundi, DRC and Rwanda. The power stations include Ruzizi I (29.8 megawatts) and Ruzizi II (43.8 megawatts), both located northwest of Ruzizi III and both operational as of June 2017. The power generated will be distributed to the three countries via existing distribution networks, connected to Ruzizi I and Ruzizi II. Both power stations and the transmission networks will be rehabilitated. Rwanda is expected to absorb 68 megawatts of the 206 megawatts generated at Ruzizi III.

== Funding ==
As of December 2015, the cost of construction was calculated at US$625.19 million. Of this, "US$138.88 million will be borne by the AfDB’s public sector window and US$50.22 million by the private sector window". Other funders include the European Investment Bank, KfW and the World Bank. More recent reports have put the cost at $450 million. Financial closure is expected to be achieved by mid-2021.

== Ownership ==
In August 2019, it was reported that the three African governments concerned had jointly selected Scatec (formerly SN Power) and Industrial Promotion Services (IPS) to execute this renewable energy infrastructure project. The consortium formed a joint venture company, called Ruzizi III Energy Limited (REL). The table below illustrates the ownership of the power station.

Shareholding In Ruzizi III Hydroelectric Power Station
Rank	Name of Owner	Percentage Ownership	Notes
1	Ruzizi III Energy Limited (Scatec and IPS)	70	
2	Government of Burundi	10	
3	Government of the Democratic Republic of the Congo	10	
4	Government of Rwanda	10	
	Total	100	

When commissioned, the power generated here is expected to cost between US$0.11 and US$0.13 per kilo Watthour of energy. An estimated 30 million people will benefit.

== See also ==
- Rwanda Power Stations
- Africa Power Dams
- World Power Dams
