= Ruzizi II Hydroelectric Power Station =

Hydroelectric power station in Africa

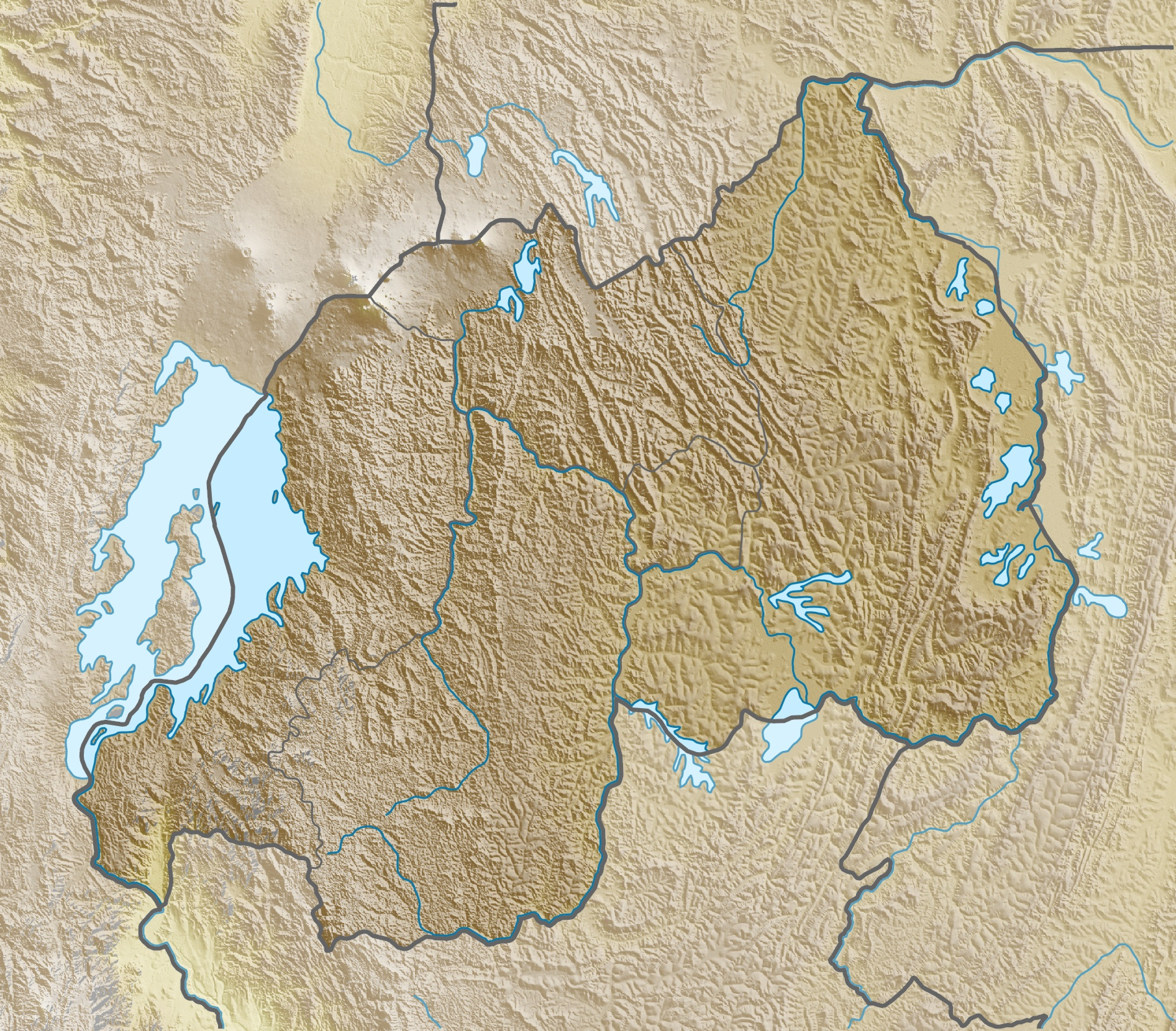
- Location on border between Rwanda and Democratic Republic of the Congo
- Official name: French: Centrale Hydroélectrique Ruzizi II
- Country: Rwanda, Democratic Republic of the Congo
- Coordinates: 2.63334°S 28.90251°E
- Purpose: Power
- Owner: International Electricity Company of the Great Lakes Countries

Dam and spillways
- Impounds: Rusizi River
- Height: 14 metres (46 ft)
- Length: 85 metres (279 ft)

Power Station
- Turbines: 3 x Francis turbines
- Installed capacity: 43.8 megawatts (58,700 hp)

Ruzizi II Hydroelectric Power Station (French: Centrale Hydroélectrique Ruzizi II) is a 44 megawatts (59,000 hp) hydroelectric power station on the Rusizi River between Rwanda and the Democratic Republic of the Congo

== Location ==
The Ruzizi II Hydroelectric Power Plant is on the Rusizi River between Rwanda and the DRC. It is 16 kilometres (9.9 mi) downstream from the Lake Kivu overflow at the head of the Rusizi River. It is in a V-shaped valley running through a mountainous region that is 1,460 metres (4,790 ft) above sea level at Bukavu, at the head of the river. The catchment area includes a mix of urban, suburban and rural land use.

== Construction ==
The Ruzizi II Hydroelectric Power Plant was built between 1983 and 1989. Construction was funded through development credit agreements between the member countries and the International Development Association, under which each country assigned the funding received to International Electricity Company of the Great Lakes Countries (SINELAC), which would undertake the project.

== Dam ==
The power plant is fed by the Ruzizi II Gravity Dam, 14 metres (46 ft) high and 85 metres (279 ft) long. The reservoir is polluted by urban wastewater. Fish ladders were installed during dam construction for migrating fish such as cyprinids. However, the dam operators have not maintained water flows in the ladders.

== Plant ==
The power plant has three Francis Turbines. It delivers a maximum of 44 MW, and has potential annual production of 200 GWH. Between 1991 and 2001 it provided, on average, 45% of Rwanda's electricity, 17% of Burundi's electricity and 21% of the DRC's electricity. The plant has suffered from technical problems and poor management. As of 2015 the average output was 25 MW.

== See also ==
- Ruzizi I Hydroelectric Power Station
- Ruzizi III Hydroelectric Power Station

== Sources ==
- Development Credit Agreement (Ruzizi II Regional Hydroelectric Power Project) (PDF), International Development Association, 4 April 1984
- Historique (in French), SINELAC, 1 May 2023
- La Communaute Economique des Pays des Grands Lacs, Government of the Republic of Rwanda
- Muvundja, Fabrice Amisi; Walumona, Jacques Riziki; Dusabe, Marie-Claire; Alunga, Georges Lufungula; Kankonda, Alidor Busanga; Albrecht, Christian; Eisenberg, Joachim; Wüest, Alfred (11 July 2022), "The Land–Water–Energy Nexus of Ruzizi River Dams (Lake Kivu Outflow, African Great Lakes Region): Status, Challenges, and Perspectives", Frontiers in Environmental Science, 10, doi:10.3389/fenvs.2022.892591
- Regional Programme of Action for Economic Development and Regional Integration (PDF), International Conference on the Great Lakes Region, June 2006
- Ruzizi’s Transmission System, Studio Pietrangeli
