= Kabezi (commune) =

Commune of Kabezi
- Commune
- Location within Burundi
- Coordinates: 3.538°S 29.3515°E
- Country: Burundi
- Time zone: UTC+2 (Central Africa Time)

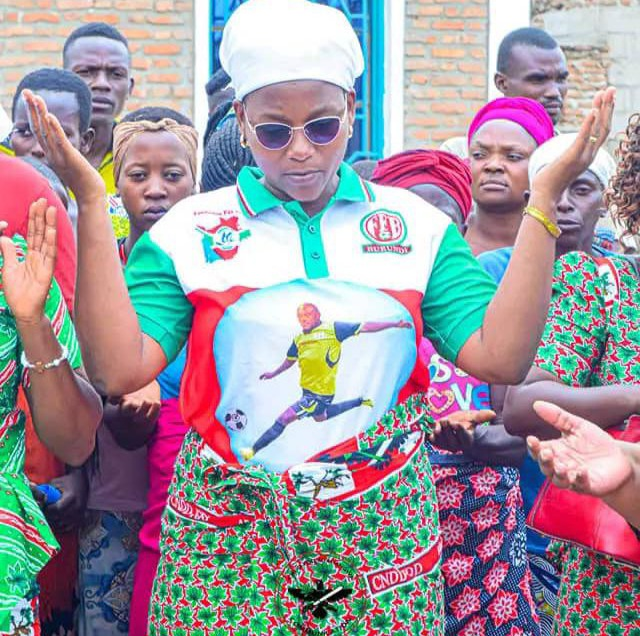
Esperance Habonimana, administrator of the Kabezi commune

Kabezi is a commune of Bujumbura Rural Province in Burundi.

The headquarters is the town of Kabezi, which contains the Kabezi Hospital.

== See also ==
- Communes of Burundi
