= Pont Ruzizi I =

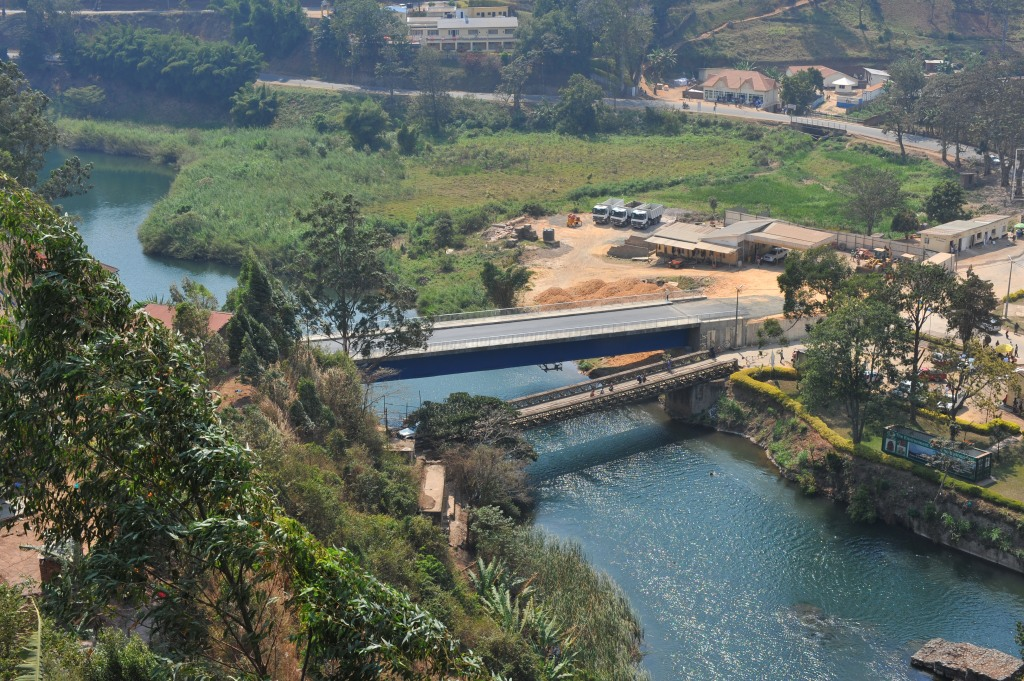
- Pont Ruzizi I
- Coordinates: 02°29′28″S 28°53′34″E
- Carried: Motor vehicles
- Crossed: Ruzizi River
- Locale: Bukavu, Democratic Republic of Congo
- Official name: None
- Next downstream: Pont frontalier

Characteristics
- Material: Reinforced concrete
- Total length: 57 m
- Width: 8 m
- Clearance below: 16.2 m (15 feet)

History
- Construction start: 2011 : new bridge
- Construction end: 2013 : new bridge
- Opened: 1935 : first bridge ? : first Bailey bridge 1982 : second Bailey bridge
- Inaugurated: 2019 : new bridge
- Collapsed: 1974 : first Bailey bridge

Location
- Interactive map of Pont Ruzizi I

The Pont Ruzizi I is a bridge in Bukavu which is one of the customs posts over the Ruzizi River between Bukavu in the Democratic Republic of Congo and Cyangugu in Rwanda.

The bridge was first built in 1935 and later destroyed to be rebuilt in 1974 in metal and wood (Bailey bridge with a capacity to support only lower weight vehicles or carrying less than 3 tonnes. It remained in a state of disrepair until the construction of this new bridge, with a capacity to support up to 30 tonnes, in 2012, with financing from the European Union in the economic program of the Economic Community of the Great Lakes Countries. It was inaugurated by the mayor of Bukavu, Bilubi Ulengabo Meschac, on 19 June 2019.

At 57 metres (187 ft), it is the second longest bridge in Bukavu, after Pont Ruzizi II, which is also a border crossing with Rwanda.
