= Kabezi Hospital =

Geography
- Location: Kabezi, Bujumbura Rural Province, Burundi
- Coordinates: 3.53376°S 29.34236°E

Organisation
- Care system: Public

Links
- Website: www.hopital-gitega.bi
- Lists: Hospitals in Burundi

The Kabezi Hospital (French: Hôpital de Kabezi) is a hospital in Bujumbura Rural Province, Burundi.

== Location ==
The Kabezi Hospital is near the coast of Lake Tanganyika on the west side of the RN3 highway, which leads north of Bujumbura Mairie. The settlement of Kabezi is on the east side of the highway. The Kabezi Hospital is the center and only public hospital in the Gitega Health District. It is a public district hospital.

== Events ==
In August 2016, there was an outbreak of cholera in the Kabezi and Bujumbura Rural health districts. By 3 August, twenty confirmed patients had been admitted to Kabezi Hospital at no charge. Ten had recovered, nine were still hospitalized and one had died. The Health Minister Josiane Nijimbere spoke at the Kabezi Hospital, saying that medicines and other supplies to combat cholera would be given free of charge. She urged the people to follow hygiene measures, including washing hands with soap, drinking clean water and washing raw food with clean water before eating it.

In the summer of 2019, there was a shortage of drinking water in the Commune of Kabezi. The springs in the mountains above Kabezi had dried up, and 800 households were without water. By 6 August, the Kabezi Health District Hospital had not had running water for two weeks.

On 19 December 2022 Brasseries et Limonaderies du Burundi (Brarudi), a Heineken N.V. subsidiary, announced that it and the Kamenge University Teaching Hospital (CHUK) had launched the Niwonkwe project, funded by the Heineken Africa Foundation. The project would provide obstetric equipment and training of health workers at CHUK and the Kabezi District Hospital.

== Sources ==
- BRARUDI and CHUK, Kamenge University Hospital (CHUK), officially launched the "NIWONKWE" project, Brarudi, 19 December 2022
- Carte Sanitaire du Burundi (PDF), Burundi Ministry of Public Health, 2016
- Financement base sur la performance HD Kabezi (in French), Ministere de la Sante Publique et de la Lutte Contre le Sida
- Mbazumutima, Abbas (5 August 2016), "Le choléra aux portes de la capitale Bujumbura : un mort et 20 personnes hospitalisées à Kabezi", Iwacu (in French)
- Misago, Jeremie (13 August 2019), "Kabezi : Pénurie d'eau potable depuis un mois", Iwacu (in French)
- "Node: Hopital de Kabezi Site 1 (9268015250)", OpenStreetMap
