= Burundi Musongati Mining =

- Trade name: BMM
- Industry: Mining
- Founded: 2014; 12 years ago
- Defunct: 2022
- Headquarters: Musongati, Rutana Province, Burundi
- Products: Nickel
- Musongati (Burundi)

Burundi Musongati Mining, or BMM, is a public-private enterprise that mines nickel near Musongati, Rutana Province, Burundi. It was formed in 2014 as a joint venture between the state of Burundi, which held 15% of the shares, and BMM International, which held 85%.

== Background ==
Nickel laterites were found in the Musongati area in 1972 during a joint exploration program by the government of Burundi and the United Nations Development Programme (UNDP). Further exploration continued through the 1970s and 1980s. The UNDP spent about US$200 million on drilling, testwork and infrastructure development, drilling down to about 12,000 metres (39,000 ft), but had to abandon the work due to the Burundian Civil War and other conflicts in the region.

Samancor Chrome was a subsidiary of Samacor Holdings Ltd, a South African joint venture between BHP (60%) and Anglo American (40%). Kermas Ltd, a Russian group registered in the British Virgin Islands, bought Samancor Chrome in April 2005, renaming it Kermas South Africa. Kermas formed a subsidiary, Samancor Nickel, in Hong Kong.

In December 2008 Samancor Nickel was granted a three year mining exploration permit on the perimeters of Musongati, Waga, and Nyabikere. Kermas financed all the costs of exploration and obtaining the permit to exploit the deposit. Burundi Mining Metallurgy International (BMM International) was created as a 91% subsidiary of Kermas South Africa. Exploratory drilling works were up to 25,000 metres (82,000 ft) deep. The deposit was estimated at 150 million tons.

== Launch ==
In May 2014 the government of Burundi signed a mining exploitation agreement wirh BMM International to exploit the nickel and associated minerals that had been found near Musongati. A joint venture, Burundi Musongati Mining (BMM-SM), was formed. BMM International held 85% of the shares and the state of Burundi held 15% as owners of the subsoil. (Note: Burundi has signed five agreement with mining companies: Comptoirs miniers des exploitations minières du Burundi (COMEBU); Burundi Musongati Mining (BMM); Tanganyika Mining Burundi (TMB); Rainbow Mining Burundi (RBM); and African Mining Burundi.) It was expected that nickel would account for 39% of the mine's revenue, iron for 34%, cobalt for 7%, platinum-group metals (PGMs) for 6%, copper for 6%, and gold ores for 3%.

The plans in 2014 included $650 million for a refinery that could process 1 million tons per year, which would ramp up as the project developed. $60 million would be spent on the basic infrastructure. Three hydropower plants with combined capacity of about 50 MW would be located on the Ruvubu River, about 45 kilometres (28 mi) from the mine. The state of Burundi would build railway lines to Tanzania to assist in exporting product. In October 2014 Second Vice-President Gervais Rufyikiri presided over the formal launch of mining activities at the Musongati site.

== History ==
The BMM did nothing after getting the license apart from a few tests. It was meant to mobilize funds to build three hydroelectric power stations within 36 months, and to start developing the mine within 12 months.

In 2015 a political crisis was caused by the decision of President Pierre Nkurunziza to run for a third term in office. Foreign aid was cut, tax and export revenues fell, and development projects were delayed. In November 2015 Kermas, which had spent nearly US$95 million on the project, had no workers at the Musongati site and did not plan to make any payments to the government that year. It could cost up to two billion dollars to install the required energy infrastructure, which would involve arranging financing from partners and institutions.

At a press briefing in April 2016 Côme Manirakiza, Minister of Mines, said Burundi was facing a fall in world prices for minerals. For example, nickel had dropped from US$54,000 per tonne at the start of 2006 was down to US$9,219 per tonne at the start of 2016.

The Uvinza-Musongati Railway Project was to build a 200 kilometres (120 mi) standard gauge railway from Musongatu to Uvinza, Tanzania, with about 50 kilometres (31 mi) of the line running through Burundi and 150 kilometres (93 mi) through Tanzania. From Uvinza goods could be transported to Dar es Salaam on the coast via the existing one meter gauge line. The main purpose of the project was to carry the huge deposits of nickel that would be exported from Musongati. As of December 2016 the detailed engineering design was delayed due to budget constraints.

On 28 February 2018 a presidential decree named Augustin Manirakiza as the administrator representing the state on the BMM board of directors.

In March 2019 a spokesperson said BMM could not undertake work due to lack of power and lack of the railway, which was still at the study stage. They had considered but rejected using solar panels.

On 3 March 2022 the government of Burundi revoked BMM International's nickel mining license by presidential decree, giving no reason. On 25 March 2022 Burundi signed an MOU with the East African Region Group company to replace BMM in exploiting the Musongati nickel mine. The government spokesperson said Burundi had taken measures to protect itself, including requiring deposit of a sum of guarantee with the central bank, and would not lose as it had with BMM, where it had been forced to break the MOU.

In February 2023 Burundi's council of ministers said they were looking for an experienced foreign firm or consortium to develop nickel and associated minerals in Rutana province. This would include mining, refining and marketing the minerals.

== See also ==
- List of companies of Burundi
- Mining industry of Burundi

== Sources ==
- A Bankable Feasibility Study of the Musongati Nickel Laterite Project, Republic of Burundi (PDF), BMM International, July 2011
- "Burundi Launches Nickel Mine", East African Business Week, Kampala, 12 October 2014
- "Burundi Looking For International Company to Extract Musongati Nickel Deposits", Taarifa, 3 March 2023
- "Business as usual in Burundi, until the money runs out", RFI, 2 November 2015
- Décret N°100/022 du 28 février 2018 portant nomination d'un Administrateur Représentant l'Etat du Burundi au Conseil d'Administration à la Société Mixte Burundi Musongati Mining (BMM) (in French)
- "Le Burundi confronté à la chute des cours mondiaux des minerais", Xinhua (in French), 23 April 2016
- "Le Burundi va tirer profit de l'exploitation du nickel par la société East African Region Group", ABP Info Burundi (in French), 27 March 2022
- Maniragaba, Mélance (29 March 2019), "Secteur minier : « La situation s'améliore »", Burundi Eco (in French)
- Misago, Jeremie (9 March 2022), "Burundi : Le permis d'exploitation de Nickel de Musongati révoqué", Iwacu
- Nishirimbere, Appolinaire (2 July 2021), COMMENTARY: Burundi loses billions of dollars in mining business amid COVID-19 pandemic, The East African Tax and Governance Network
- Review of Feasibility Study and Detailed Engineering Design For Uvinza-Musongati Railway Project (PDF), Central Corridor Transit Transport Facilitation Agency, December 2016
- Solomons, Ilan (22 August 2014), "Significant PGM prospects at Burundi project", Mining Weekly
