= Ruzizi I Hydroelectric Power Station =

Hydroelectric power station in Africa

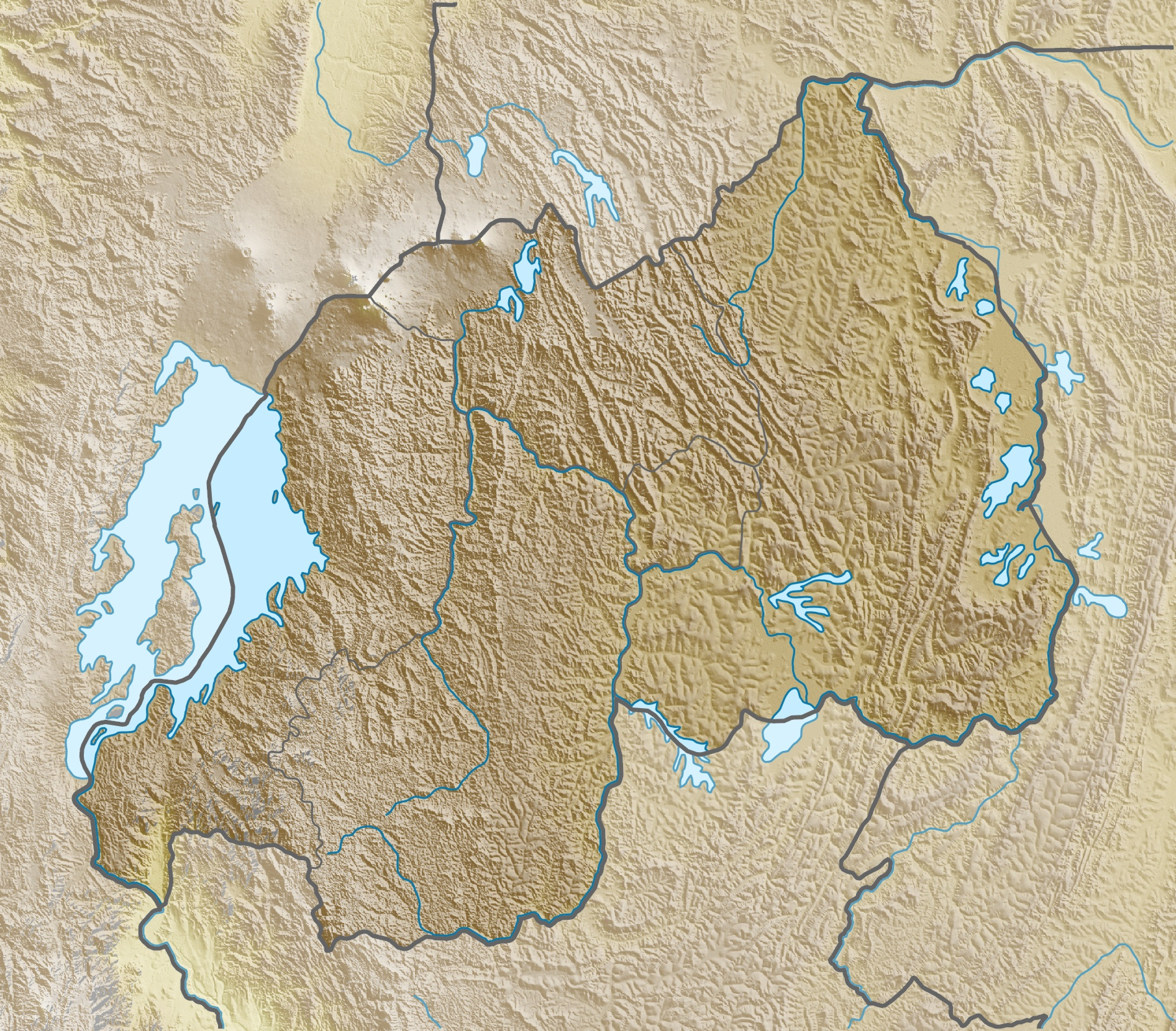
- Location on border between Rwanda and Democratic Republic of the Congo
- Official name: French: Centrale Hydroélectrique Ruzizi I
- Country: Rwanda, Democratic Republic of the Congo
- Coordinates: 2.50909°S 28.87513°E
- Purpose: Power

Dam and spillways
- Impounds: Rusizi River

Power Station
- Turbines: 4 Kaplan turbines
- Installed capacity: 29.8 megawatts (40,000 hp)

Ruzizi I Hydroelectric Power Station (French: Centrale Hydroélectrique Ruzizi II) is a 29.8 megawatts (40,000 hp) hydroelectric power station on the Rusizi River between Rwanda and the Democratic Republic of the Congo.

== Location ==
The Ruzizi I Hydroelectric Power Plant is on the Rusizi River between Rwanda and the DRC. The city of Bukavu, DRC, is to the north and west of the dam, and the settlement of Burongo, Rwanda, is to the southeast. The dam is 3 kilometres (1.9 mi) downstream from the Lake Kivu overflow at the head of the Rusizi River. It is in a V-shaped valley running through a mountainous region that is 1,460 metres (4,790 ft) above sea level at Bukavu, at the head of the river. The catchment area is mostly urban.

== Dam ==
The dam and power plant are operated by the Société Nationale d'Électricité (SNEL). The Ruzizi I Gravity Dam is 15 metres (49 ft) high and 195 metres (640 ft) long. Lake Kivu serves as the reservoir. Fish ladders were installed during dam construction for migrating fish such as cyprinids. However, the dam operators have not maintained water flows in the ladders.

== Power plant ==
Ruzizi I was commissioned in 1959. The plant has two 7 MW Kaplan vertical-axis turbines and two 9.1 MW Kaplan vertical-axis turbines. The turbines were commissioned between 1958 and 1973. It has a total power of 29.8 MW. The plant has suffered from technical problems and poor management. As of 2015 Ruzizi I was operating at an average power of about 16 MW.

== See also ==
- Ruzizi II Hydroelectric Power Station
- Ruzizi III Hydroelectric Power Station

== Sources ==
- Muvundja, Fabrice Amisi; Walumona, Jacques Riziki; Dusabe, Marie-Claire; Alunga, Georges Lufungula; Kankonda, Alidor Busanga; Albrecht, Christian; Eisenberg, Joachim; Wüest, Alfred (11 July 2022), "The Land–Water–Energy Nexus of Ruzizi River Dams (Lake Kivu Outflow, African Great Lakes Region): Status, Challenges, and Perspectives", Frontiers in Environmental Science, 10, doi:10.3389/fenvs.2022.892591
- RUZIZI I & II, INGEROP
- Ruzizi's Transmission System, Studio Pietrangeli
- "Ruzizi III Hydropower Plant Project", Power Technology, 27 August 2019
- "Way: Ruzizi I Hydro Power Plant (195072407)", OpenStreetMap, 15 November 2021
