= Kaburantwa River =

River in Burundi

- Location within Burundi
- Native name: French: Rivière Kaburantwa

Location
- Country: Burundi
- Province: Bubanza Province, Cibitoke Province

Physical characteristics
- Mouth: Ruzizi River,
  - coordinates: 3.01841°S 29.22475°E

The Kaburantwa River is a river in northwestern Burundi.

== Course ==
The Kaburantwa River rises at an elevation of almost 2,500 metres (8,200 ft) in the Nyungwe-Kibira forest, and falls to 842 metres (2,762 ft) at the Ruzizi River. The slopes average 33%. The watershed covers 53,108 hectares (131,230 acres). 3,002 hectares (7,420 acres) of the river basin is irrigated.

The river flows through Cibitoke Province. It forms in the Nyungwe Forest, and flows south-southeast, in one section forming the border with Rwanda. It leaves the border where it is joined by the Buyumpu River (Note: The Buyumpu River flows west along the Burundi-Rwanda border from a point just west of the point where the Mwogere River reaches the border and flows east along the border.) from the east, then flows south and southeast. Below the Rwanda border the Kaburantwa is joined from the left (southeast) by the Nyarubugu and Nyakibaya, and from the right (northwest) by the Munyinya and the Nyarurama, Rubugenge and Rukasantwa. It then turns west and flows past Bukinanyana and Buganda to enter the Ruzizi River east of Ndava.

== Hydroelectricity ==
The Gitenge–Kagunuzi River and the Kaburantwa River are important tributaries on the east side of the Ruzizi river, with an estimated total hydroelectric potential of about 100 MW. The Kaburantwa watershed alone has hydroelectric potential of 44 MW.

In 1995 the Kabu 16 project on the Kaburantwa River, 16 kilometres (9.9 mi) above its confluence with the Ruzizi River, was expected to generate 117.7 GWh of electricity per year. It would have a 191 metres (627 ft) head. In 2010 the Nile Basin Initiative asked for expressions of interest from consultants to prepare updated studies of the project. Construction of the 20 MW Kabu 16 Hydroelectric Power Station began in March 2019. It was to have two 10 ME Francis turbines supplied and installed by Voith Hydro. In June 2019 Voith Hydro said the work should be finished by the third quarter of 2020.

== Issues ==
Gold miners use the Nyamagana, Muhira, Kaburantwa and Kagunuzi rivers in the provinces of Cibitoke, Bubanza and Kayanza to wash their products; builders extract rubble, gravel and sand for construction from the rivers; and farmers weaken their banks by failing to leave a 5 metres (16 ft) strip of uncultivated land along the banks. All this contributes to pollution of the river water and to collapse of the banks, damaging bridges, roads, buildings and other infrastructure near the rivers.

== See also ==
- List of rivers of Burundi

== Sources ==
- Buzuguri, Goreth (22 June 2017), "Le MEEATU appelle au respect du code de l'eau et des règles environnementales", Radio Télévision Nationale du Burundi (in French)
- Goffin, M (December 2020), Baseline Study for the basin of Lake Kivu and the Rusizi/Ruzizi River (PDF), SHER Consult
- Investment opportunities in renewable energy Burundi (PDF), Minister for Energy and Mines, October 2012, p. 14
- Nile group seeks studies of 20-MW Kabu 16 in Burundi, 25 October 2010
- "Relation: Kaburantwa (16272803)", OpenStreetMap
- Republic of Burundi Energy sector rehabilitation project (PDF), World Bank, 14 February 1991
- Update on progress of 20-MW Kabu 16 small hydropower in Burundi, HydroReview, 18 June 2019
- U.S. Defense Mapping Agency (1994), Ndora (PDF), University of Texas at Austin
