= Mugamba natural region =

Mugamba natural region Région naturelle de Mugamba
- Natural region
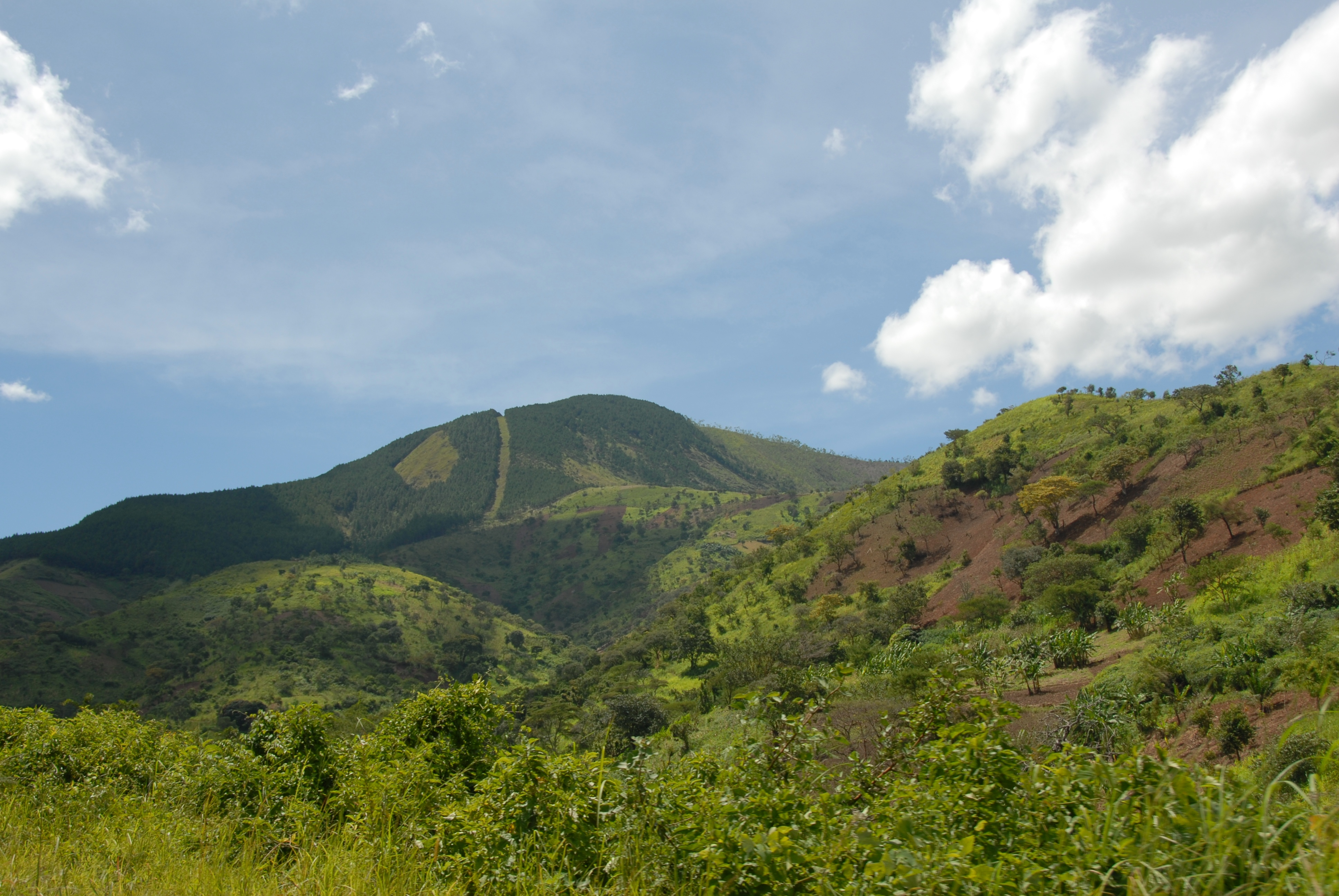
- Hilly landscape, typical of the Mugamba region

- Location within Burundi
- Coordinates: 3.3846°S 29.5817°E
- Country: Burundi

The Mugamba natural region is a natural region of Burundi. It extends along the ridge that divides the Congo watershed from the Nile watershed, and contains the highest peaks in the country.

== Geography ==
The Mugamba ("Cow") region (Région naturelle de Mugamba) was a region where livestock were the basis of the economy. The Mugamba region extends from north to south through the east of Cibitoke Province, the west of Kayanza Province and Muramvya Province, the east of Bujumbura Province, the west of Mwaro Province and the north of Bururi Province. Mugamba contains the highest peaks of the country: Heha at 2,670 metres (8,760 ft), Teza at 2,655 metres (8,711 ft) and Twinyoni at 2,652 metres (8,701 ft).

The Mugamba region has the geological particularity of being a sharing zone of the hydrographic basins of the two largest rivers in Africa: the Congo and the Nile. The Congo-Nile ridge is now almost entirely covered by artificial afforestation which has replaced the original cover.

== Climate ==
This region is characterized by high relief (2,300 m on average) and annual temperatures between 14° and 17 °C .

The mountainous area experiences a significant annual rainy cycle (between 1300 and 2300 mm /year) with a peak in precipitation observed in September.

== Anthropology ==
Historic populations in this area have created shelters to protect themselves from the relatively low temperatures and high precipitation of this area. The rugo, or traditional Burundian house or housing complex, of this area includes dwellings of all the members of the same family, and is surrounded by a bamboo fence. The dimension of the house is determined by the size of a person lengthened on the ground, extending their right hand outward. A stake having to be used for the tracing of the diameter of the house is then fixed at the end of the finger (the major one). This dimension is function of the social status and the needs for the owner.

The round-shaped main house is surrounded by two large enclosures demarcating the front courtyard ("urugo") and the rear courtyard ("ikigo"). The forecourt ("ikirugu") serves as a livestock park. A hearth ("igicaniro") placed in the center protects these animals against flies. Next to it, there is a pole ("icishinzo") traditionally placed there for cows to rub against. In each enclosure, there are smaller dwellings.

== World Heritage Status ==
This site was added to the UNESCO World Heritage Tentative List on May 9, 2007, in the Cultural category.

== Sources ==
- Atlas des quatre sites Ramsar: Localisation et Resources (PDF) (in French), Ministry of Water, Environment and Urbanism, October 2014
- Irambona, Yvette (12 April 2022), Les régions naturelles du Burundi : Leur signification se fonde sur plusieurs critères
- Segamba, Léonce; Ndikumasabo, Vincent; Makinson, Carolyn; Ayad, Mohamed (1988), Enquête Démographique et de Santé au Burundi 1987. (PDF) (in French), Columbia, Maryland, USA: Ministère de l'Intérieur Département de la Population/Burundi and Institute for Resource Development/Westinghouse.
