= Ruhwa, Rwanda =

Ruhwa
- Location in Rwanda
- Coordinates: 02°43′52″S 29°02′29″E
- Country: Rwanda
- Province: Western Province
- District: Rusizi District
- Elevation: 3,900 ft (1,200 m)

Ruhwa is a town in western Rwanda.

== Location ==
The coordinates of Ruhwa, Rwanda are:2°43'52.0"S, 29°02'29.0"E (Latitude:-2.731111; Longitude:29.041389).

== Population ==
The population of Ruhwa, Rwanda is not publicly known at this time.

== Points of interest ==
The most important point of interest is the international border crossing between Rwanda and Burundi along Highway RN5. The border crossing maintains a one-stop border stop.

== See also ==
- Bugarama
- Bujumbura
- Bukavu
- Lake Kivu
- Ruhwa, Burundi
