= Zanandore =

Town in Burundi

- Town
- Location within Burundi
- Coordinates: 3°15′S 30°07′E
- Country: Burundi
- Province: Karuzi
- Administrative district: Nyabikere

Population (2022)
  - Total: 27,867

Zanandore is a town located in Karuzi Province, Burundi, Africa. It falls within the second-order administrative district of Nyabikere. The town's population was recorded as 27,867 in 2022. Zanandore is situated at an elevation of 1,543 metres above sea level and is located near the village of Butamenwa and the town of Nyabikere.
