= Commune of Murwi =

Coordinates: 2°53′47″S 29°12′29″E

- Commune
- Interactive map of Commune of Murwi
- Country: Burundi
- Province: Cibitoke Province
- Administrative center: Murwi
- Time zone: UTC+2 (Central Africa Time)

The commune of Murwi is a commune of Cibitoke Province in north-western Burundi. The capital lies at Murwi.
