= Ruzunga =

- Location in Burundi
- Coordinates: 3°51′29″S 29°38′43″E
- Country: Burundi
- Province: Bururi Province

Ruzunga is a town in the Bururi Province of Burundi.
