= Commune of Mugina =

Coordinates: 2°47′39″S 29°07′41″E

- Commune
- Interactive map of Commune of Mugina
- Country: Burundi
- Province: Cibitoke Province
- Administrative center: Mugina
- Time zone: UTC+2 (Central Africa Time)

The commune of Mugina is a commune of Cibitoke Province in north-western Burundi. The capital lies at Mugina. In 2007, DGHER electrified two rural villages in the commune.
