= Kabezi =

- Town
- Location within Burundi
- Coordinates: 3.5368°S 29.34848°E
- Country: Burundi
- Province: Bujumbura Rural Province
- Commune: Commune of Kabezi
- Time zone: UTC+2 (Central Africa Time)

Kabezi is a town in Bujumbura Rural Province in Burundi.

Kabezi is in the Commune of Kabezi, just east of the RN 3 highway, which runs south from Bujumbura along the shore of Lake Tanganyika. It contains the Kabezi Hospital.

Rainbow Mining Burundi's rare earth ore processing plant was built in 2018 near the town of Kabezi between Lake Tanganyika to the west and the RN3 road to the east. The Kabezi plant did crushing and gravity separation. In August 2021 Rainbow Rare Earths announced that almost all staff had been placed on suspension.

== Sources ==
- Gakara Rare Earth Project, NS Energy, 20 October 2020
- "Node: Kabezi (1673541099)", OpenStreetMap
- "Rainbow Rare Earths Limited Announces Update on Trial Mining Operations from the Gakara Project in Burundi", Market Screener, 5 August 2021
- Reichhardt, Friedrich; Witley, Jeremy; Hudson, Jonathan (4 June 2019), Rainbow Rare Earths Limited Gakara REE Project Burundi (PDF), The MSA Group (Pty) Ltd
