= Cibitoke =

- City
- Location in Burundi
- Coordinates: 2°53′19″S 29°07′12″E
- Country: Burundi
- Province: Cibitoke Province
- Elevation: 915 m (3,002 ft)

Population (2008)
  - Total: 23,885

Cibitoke is a city located in northwestern Burundi, near the border of Democratic Republic of the Congo. It is the capital of the Cibitoke Province.

The city is the birthplace of Olympic judoka Odette Ntahonvukiye.

Cibotoke Province is governed by a community administrator. It is further divided into 6 communes:

1. Buganda
2. Bukinanyana
3. Murwi
4. Rugombo
5. Mugina
6. Mabayi
