= Ndava, Bubanza =

Ndava
- Location in Burundi
- Coordinates: 3°6′39″S 29°30′30″E
- Country: Burundi
- Province: Bubanza Province
- Commune: Commune of Musigati
- Time zone: UTC+2 (Central Africa Time)

Ndava is a village in the Commune of Musigati in Bubanza Province in northwestern Burundi.
