= Commune of Mabayi =

Coordinates: 2°42′22″S 29°17′11″E

- Commune
- Interactive map of Commune of Mabayi
- Country: Burundi
- Province: Cibitoke Province
- Administrative center: Mabayi
- Time zone: UTC+2 (Central Africa Time)

The commune of Mabayi is a commune of Cibitoke Province in north-western Burundi. The capital lies at Mabayi.
