= Ruhwa River =

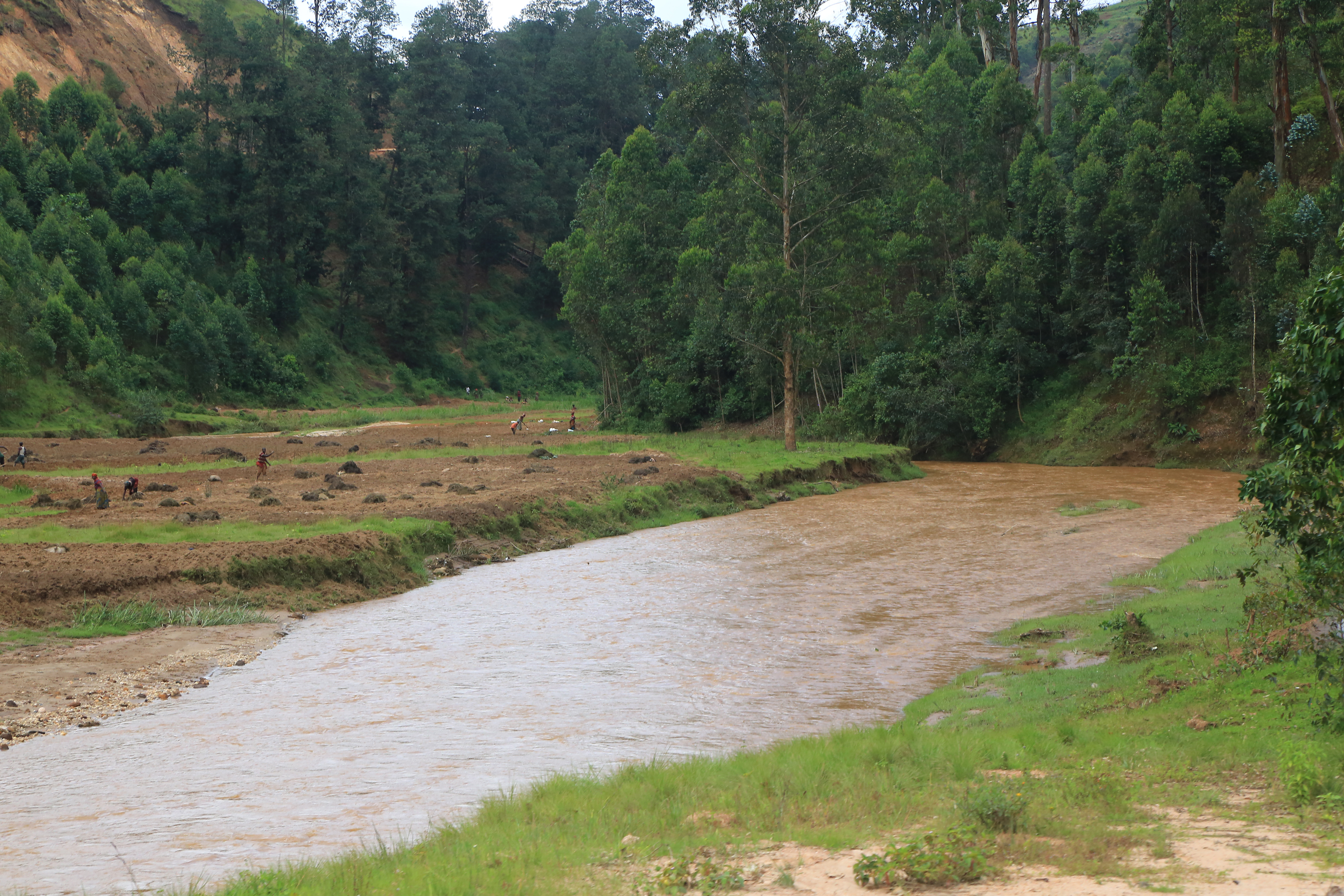

Location
- Country: Rwanda

Physical characteristics
- Mouth
  - coordinates: 2.74283°S 29.04076°E

Basin features
- River system: Rusizi River
- Tributaries
  - right: Murangazi, Koko, Rwengezi, Kabingo

The Ruhwa River (or Lua, Luha, Luhwa, Luwa, Ruwa) is a river in southwestern Rwanda that is a left-hand tributary of the Ruzizi River. It joins the Ruzizi, which forms the boundary between Rwanda and the Democratic Republic of the Congo, about 2 kilometres (1.2 mi) below the point where the Rubyiro River enters the Ruzizi. The Ruhwa forms the boundary between the western regions of Rwanda and Burundi.
