= Ruzizi River =

River in Central Africa

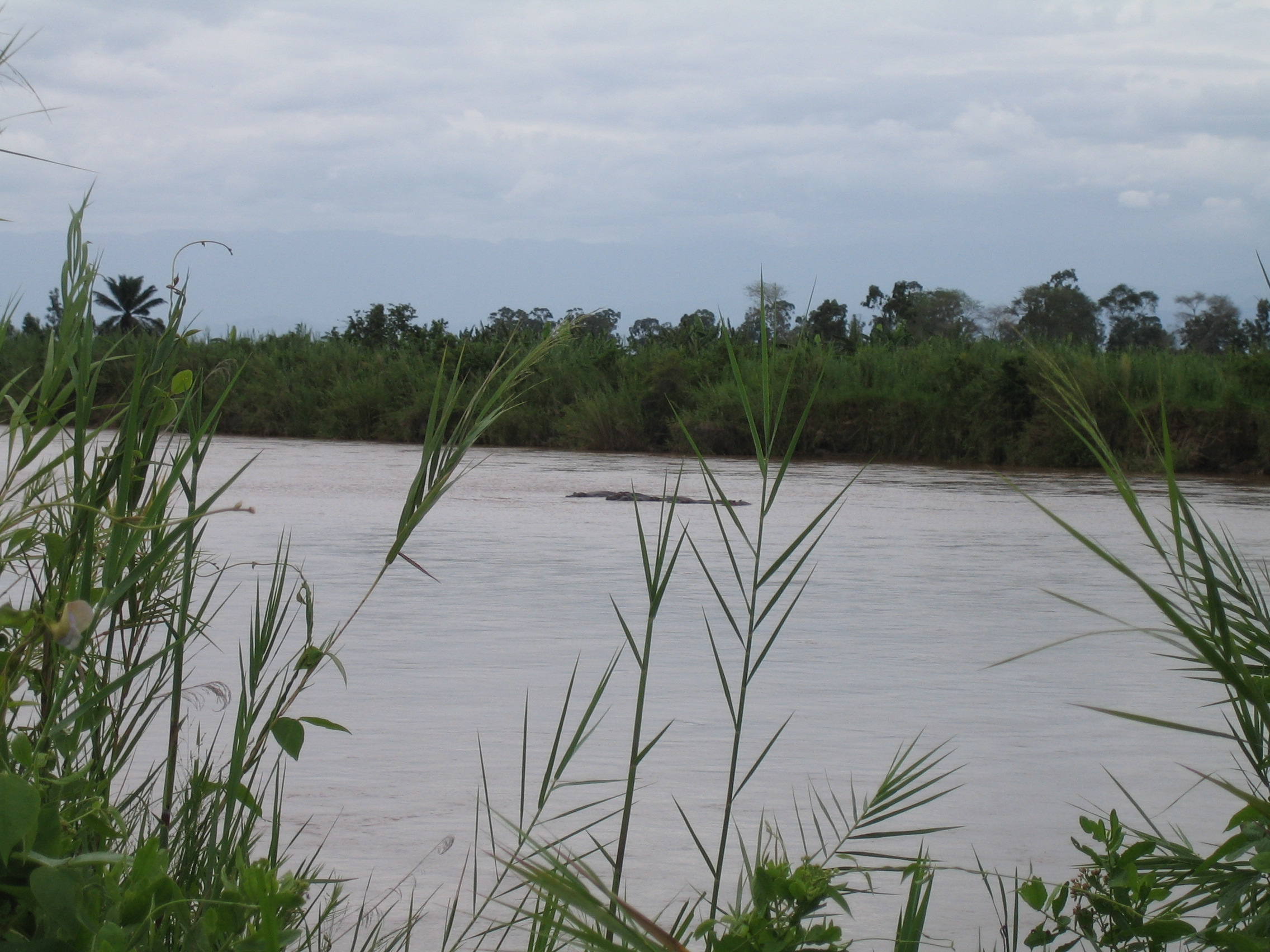
- Hippopotami in the Ruzizi River in Burundi

Location
- Countries: DR Congo (DRC); Rwanda; Burundi

Physical characteristics
- Source: Lake Kivu
  - location: border between Bukavu and Cyangugu, South Kivu, DRC
  - coordinates: 02°29′27″S 28°53′35″E
  - elevation: 1,472 m (4,829 ft)
- Mouth: Lake Tanganyika
  - location: west of Bujumbura, Burundi
  - coordinates: 03°21′51″S 29°16′04″E
  - elevation: 768 m (2,520 ft)
- Length: 117 km (73 mi)
- Discharge
  - average: 100 m^{3}/s (3,500 cu ft/s)

The Ruzizi (also sometimes spelled Rusizi, French: Rivière Ruzizi; Dutch: Ruzizi Rivier) is a river, 117 kilometres (73 mi) long, that flows from Lake Kivu to Lake Tanganyika in Central Africa, descending from about 1,500 metres (4,900 ft) to about 770 metres (2,530 ft) above sea level over its length. The steepest gradients occur over the first 40 kilometres (25 mi), where hydroelectric dams have been built. Further downstream, the Ruzizi Plain, the floor of the Western Rift Valley, has gentle hills, and the river flows into Lake Tanganyika through a delta, with one or two small channels splitting off from the main channel.

The Ruzizi is a young river, formed about 10,000 years ago when volcanism associated with continental rifting created the Virunga Mountains. The mountains blocked Lake Kivu's former outlet to the drainage basin of the Nile and instead forced the lake overflow south down the Ruzizi and the drainage basin of the Congo.

== Course ==
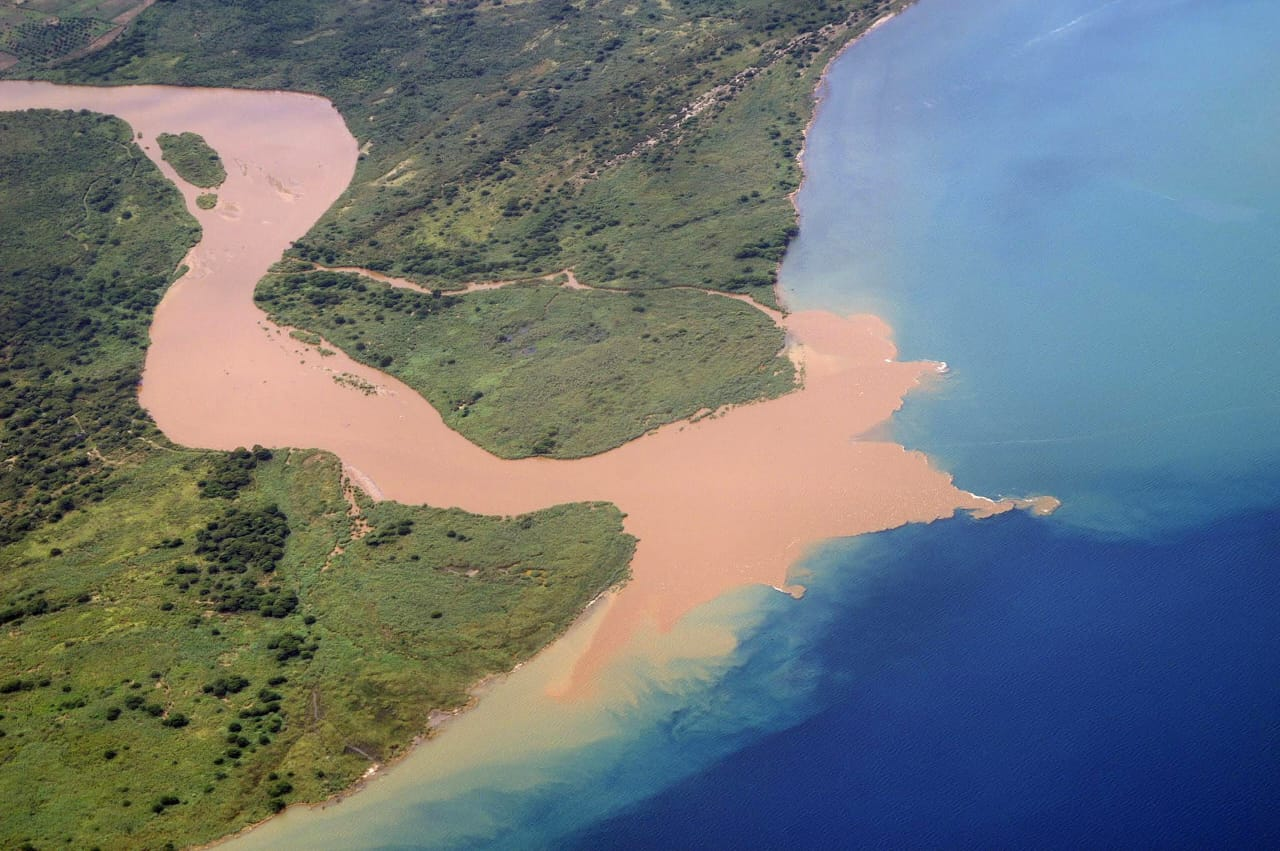
Ruzizi River flowing into Lake Tanganyika

Along its upstream reaches, the river forms part of the border between Rwanda on the east with the Democratic Republic of the Congo (DRC) on the west. Further downstream, it forms part of the border between the DRC and Burundi, and its lowermost reach lies entirely within Burundi. To the west, the Fizi Baraka mountains tower over the river. The Bridge of Concord, Burundi's longest bridge, crosses the river near its mouth. Tributaries of the Ruzizi River include the Nyamagana, Muhira, Kaburantwa, Kagunuzi, Rubyiro and Ruhwa, among others.

The Ruzizi River, flowing south into Lake Tanganyika, is part of the upper watershed of the Congo River. Nineteenth-century British explorers such as Richard Francis Burton and John Hanning Speke, uncertain of the direction of flow of the Ruzizi, thought that it might flow north out of the lake toward the White Nile. Their research and follow-up explorations by David Livingstone and Henry Morton Stanley established that this was not the case. The Ruzizi flows into Lake Tanganyika, which overflows into the Lukuga River about 120 kilometres (75 mi) south of Ujiji. The Lukuga flows west into the Lualaba River, a major tributary of the Congo.

== Geology ==
Rifting, the slow pulling apart of a tectonic plate, has produced the East African Rift system and its many basins and lakes. The system, on the boundary between the African Plate (Nubian Plate) and the Somali Plate, has two branches, both oriented north–south. Rifting in the western branch, called the Albertine Rift, began between 25 and 10 million years ago. The Ruzizi River lies along the western rift, which includes, from north to south, lakes Albert, George, Edward, Kivu, Tanganyika, Rukwa, Malawi, and others.

Uplift associated with the rifting altered the connections among the region's water bodies. About 13,000 to 9,000 years ago, volcanic activity blocked Lake Kivu's former outlet to the watershed of the Nile. The volcanism produced mountains, including the Virungas, which rose between Lake Kivu and Lake Edward, to the north. Water from Lake Kivu was then forced south down the Ruzizi. This, in turn, raised the level of Lake Tanganyika, which overflowed down the Lukuga River. Variations in uplift and climate have caused the Ruzizi and Lukuga to open and close multiple times since then.

== Hydroelectricity ==
The Ruzizi I Hydroelectric Power Station was built at the Ruzizi River outlet from Lake Kivu in 1958. The Ruzizi II Hydroelectric Power Station was added in 1989. Ruzizi I and II are operated by a tri-national company (Burundi, Rwanda and Democratic Republic of the Congo) owned by the Economic Community of the Great Lakes Countries. The consortium is planning two more dams, Ruzizi III and Ruzizi IV.

Ruzizi I has a generating capacity of about 30 megawatts (MW) and Ruzizi II about 44 MW. Ruzizi III, to be built downstream of the other two, is projected to have a capacity of 145 MW when it becomes operational in about 2027. As part of the Ruzizi III project, Ruzizi I and II are to be refurbished. If eventually built, Ruzizi IV will be positioned between Ruzizi II and Ruzizi III and is projected to operate at more than 200 MW. On January 16, 2020, the African Development Bank allocated €8 million for technical assistance on the Ruzizi IV hydroelectric project. It is expected to provide 287 MW to the Democratic Republic of the Congo, Rwanda and Burundi.

== Fauna and flora ==
Reed swamps are common along the lower main stem of the river and its tributaries. Near the mouth, the riparian swamps are up to 3 kilometres (1.9 mi) wide. The swamps' total area in Burundi has been estimated at 12,000 hectares (30,000 acres) with reeds varying in height from 2 to 4 metres (6.6 to 13.1 ft), depending on the degree of inundation. Residents use the reeds for thatching and other domestic purposes. Further from the river, much of the lower river valley consists of grassland, heavily grazed by cattle.

A widely publicized man-eating crocodile, Gustave, roams the banks of the Ruzizi River and the northern shores of Lake Tanganyika. Gustave, estimated to be about 6 metres (20 ft) long and to weigh about 900 kilograms (2,000 lb), is said to have killed and eaten many people. In the film documenting Gustave ("Capturing the Killer Croc"), the narrator states that "In the 1950s, buffalo, elephants and common warthogs inhabited the plain; but they were progressively exterminated by man. The only survivor amongst the large mammals has been the hippopotamus. And they share the river, in an uneasy co-existence, with the nile crocodiles."

== See also ==
- Pont Ruzizi I
- Pont Ruzizi II
