= Commune of Rugombo =

Coordinates: 2°53′11″S 29°07′12″E

- Commune
- Interactive map of Commune of Rugombo
- Country: Burundi
- Province: Cibitoke Province
- Administrative center: Rugombo
- Time zone: UTC+2 (Central Africa Time)

The commune of Rugombo is a commune of Cibitoke Province in north-western Burundi. The capital lies at Rugombo.
