= Cibitoke Province =

Former province of Burundi

Coordinates: 2°49′35″S 29°10′22″E

- Province
- Country: Burundi
- Capital: Cibitoke

Area
  - Total: 1,635.52 km^{2} (631.48 sq mi)

Population (2008 census)
  - Total: 460,435
  - Density: 281.522/km^{2} (729.139/sq mi)

Cibitoke Province was one of the provinces of Burundi. In 2025, it was merged into the new Bujumbura Province.

== Location ==
Cibitoke Province was in the northwest of Burundi. The Democratic Republic of the Congo was to the west and Rwanda is to the north. Bubanza Province was to the south and Kayanza Province was to the east. Cibitoke Province contained part of the Imbo natural region in the west, Mumirwa natural region in the center and Mugamba natural region in the east.

== Communes ==
It was divided administratively into the following communes:

- Commune of Buganda
- Commune of Bukinanyana
- Commune of Mabayi
- Commune of Mugina
- Commune of Murwi
- Commune of Rugombo

== Sources ==
- Atlas des quatre sites Ramsar: Localisation et Resources (PDF) (in French), Ministry of Water, Environment and Urbanism, October 2014
