= Kinyankuru River =

River in Burundi

- Location within Burundi
- Native name: Rivière Kinyankuru (French)

Location
- Country: Burundi
- Provinces: Ngozi, Karuzi, Muyinga, Kayanza

Physical characteristics
- Source: Nyamuswaga River
  - location: Muyinga Province
  - coordinates: 2°44′6″S 30°11′32″E
  - elevation: 1,711 m (5,614 ft)
- Mouth: Rurubu River
  - location: Between Gitega, Ngozi, and Karuzi provinces
  - coordinates: 3°05′09″S 29°55′35″E
  - elevation: 1,509 m (4,951 ft)
- Length: 66.7 km (41.4 mi)
- Basin size: 1,043.1 km^{2} (402.7 sq mi)
- Discharge
  - location: Mouth
  - average: 8.64 m^{3} (305.0 cu ft)
  - minimum: 2.56 m^{3} (90.55 cu ft)
  - maximum: 19.76 m^{3} (697.7 cu ft)

Basin features
- Progression: Rurubu → Kagera → Lake Victoria → White Nile → Nile
- Population: 752,000
- Tributaries
  - left: Nyamuswaga, Nyabusyo
  - right: Nyacijima, Nyakagezi

The Kinyankuru River (French: Rivière Kinyankuru) is a river in Burundi, a tributary of the Rurubu River.

== Course ==
The Kinyankuru River is a major tributary of the Rurubu River. It collects runoff from the central and south communes of Ngozi Province: Gashikanwa, Kiremba, Ngozi, Ruhororo and Tangara.

The Kinyankuru forms to the southeast of the town of Ngozi, where the Nyacijima River and Nyamuswaga River converge in an area of swamps that is drained by the Kinyankuru. Further south it is joined from the right (west) by the Nyakagezi River. The river runs between the Kimerejana and Rimiro collines in the Commune of Ruhororo, Ngozi Province. The Nyabusyo River joins the river from the left further down. It flows into the Ruvubu at the southern tip of Ngozi province.

== Environment ==
The surroundings of Kinyankuru are a mosaic of agricultural land and natural vegetation. Around Kinyankuru The area is densely populated, with 331 inhabitants per square kilometer as of 2016. The average annual temperature in the area is 20 °C (68 °F). The warmest month is September, when the average temperature is 22 °C (72 °F), and the coldest is April, with 18 °C (64 °F). Average annual rainfall is 1,149 millimetres (45.2 in). The wettest month is December, with an average of 175 millimetres (6.9 in) of precipitation, and the driest is July, with 1 millimetre (0.039 in) of precipitation.

== Marshes ==
As of 2009 the marshes along the river were almost entirely exploited for farming, including the buffer zones that were meant to regulate the water levels. There were two unmanaged marshes on the Kinyankuru In Ngozi Province as of 2014: 220 hectares (540 acres) in the Commune of Gashikanwa and 564 hectares (1,390 acres) in the Commune of Ruhororo. There was an unmanaged marsh on the Kinyankuru in Karuzi Province of 38 hectares (94 acres) in the Commune of Gihogazi.

== See also ==
- List of rivers of Burundi

== Sources ==
- Igirukwishaka, J.B.; Bararunyeretse, P.; Habonayo, R.; Bangirinama, F. (6 September 2023), "Contribution à la caractérisation des plantes envahissantes des marais de la rivière Ruvubu" (PDF), Bulletin Scientifique sur l'Environnement et la Biodiversité (in French)
- Investment opportunities in renewable energy Burundi (PDF), Minister for Energy and Mines, October 2012, p. 14
- Linke, Simon; Lehner, Bernhard; Ouellet Dallaire, Camille; Ariwi, Joseph; Grill, Günther; Anand, Mira; Beames, Penny; Burchard-Levine, Vicente; Maxwell, Sally; Moidu, Hana; Tan, Florence; Thieme, Michele (2019-12-09), "Global hydro-environmental sub-basin and river reach characteristics at high spatial resolution", Scientific Data, 6 (1), doi:10.1038/s41597-019-0300-6, ISSN 2052-4463, PMC 6901482, PMID 31819059
- Liu, Luling; Cao, Xin; Li, Shijie; Jie, Na (2024-01-24), A 31-year (1990–2020) global gridded population dataset generated by cluster analysis and statistical learning, vol. 11, doi:10.1038/s41597-024-02913-0, ISSN 2052-4463, PMC 10808219, PMID 38267476
- NASA Earth Observations: Population Density, NASA/SEDAC, archived from the original on 9 February 2016
- NASA Earth Observations Data Set Index, NASA, archived from the original on 11 May 2020 Temperature data from satellite measurements of the earth's surface temperature within a box that is 0.1×0.1 degrees.
- NASA Earth Observations: Rainfall (1 month - TRMM), NASA/Tropical Rainfall Monitoring Mission, archived from the original on 11 May 2020 Average value for the years 2012–2014 within a box that is 0.1×0.1 degrees.
- NASA Earth Observations: Land Cover Classification, NASA/MODIS, archived from the original on 28 February 2016
- Ngozi (PDF), United States Government Defense Mapping Agency, 1994
- Rapport sur la situation des déplacés de guerre internes au Burundi (PDF) (in French), FORSC, May 2017
- Schéma Provincial d'Aménagement du Territoire de Ngozi (in French), URAM, 2009
- Strategie nationale de developpement de la filiere riz au Burundi (PDF) (in French), Bujumbura: Ministere de l’agriculture et de l’elevage, 2014
