= Nyakijima River =

River in Burundi

Nyakijima River Nyacijima River
- Location within Burundi
- Native name: Rivière Nyakijima (French)

Location
- Country: Burundi
- Provinces: Ngozi, Kayanza

Physical characteristics
- Source
  - location: Commune of Busiga
  - coordinates: 2°52′58″S 29°43′4″E
  - elevation: 1,707 m (5,600 ft)
- Mouth: Kinyankuru River
  - location: Commune of Gashikanwa (Border)
  - coordinates: 2.969615°S 29.928011°E
  - elevation: 1,531 m (5,023 ft)
- Length: 28.9 km (18.0 mi)
- Basin size: 238.6 km^{2} (92.1 sq mi)
- Discharge
  - location: Mouth
  - average: 2.04 m^{3} (72.01 cu ft)
  - minimum: 0.636 m^{3} (22.46 cu ft)
  - maximum: 4.54 m^{3} (160.3 cu ft)

Basin features
- Progression: Kinyankuru → Ruvubu → Kagera → Lake Victoria → White Nile → Nile → Mediterranean Sea
- Population: 250,000

The Nyakijima River (French: Rivière Nyakijima), or Nyacijima River, is a river in Burundi, a tributary of the Kinyankuru River.

== Course ==
The Nyakijima River separates the Commune of Gashikanwa to the north from the Commune of Ngozi to the west and south. The river forms to the south of the town of Ngozi and flows east-southeast through marshes to its junction with the marshes of the Nyamuswaga River. The Kinyankuru River drains these marshes. The Kinyankuru is in turn a tributary of the Ruvubu River.

== Environment ==
The surroundings of Nyacijima are a mosaic of agricultural land and natural vegetation. Around Nyacijima The area is densely populated, with 442 inhabitants per square kilometer as of 2016. The average annual temperature in the area is 19 °C (66 °F). The warmest month is September, when the average temperature is 21 °C (70 °F), and the coldest is April, with 17 °C (63 °F). Average annual rainfall is 1,149 millimetres (45.2 in). The wettest month is December, with an average of 175 millimetres (6.9 in) of precipitation, and the driest is July, with 1 millimetre (0.039 in) of precipitation.

== Agriculture ==
The Nyacijima marsh has a developed area of more than 450 hectares (1,100 acres) and is the largest supplier of rice in Ngozi province. In November 2019 Pascal Nyabenda, President of the National Assembly, visited the area of the Nyavyamo Marsh developed by Prodema and Prodefi lin Ruhororo colline, as well as the marsh's modern irrigation dam. The marsh covered 538 hectares (1,330 acres) divided into ten sectors. Using modern varieties, rice yield was 6-7 tons per hectare.

In 2019 a 8 hectares (20 acres) model farm in Gatika, Commune of Busiga, demonstrated use of a drip irrigation system. Water was pumped from the Nyakijima River and stored in tanks at a cost of about 2.5 litres (0.55 imp gal; 0.66 US gal) of fuel per day. From the tanks it was delivered to the fields using drip irrigation. Crops included legumes, corn and tubers.

In January 2023 rice farmers were compaining of a shortage of seeds and of insufficient irrigation water in some parts of the marsh. The water shortage was due to rainwater from the city of Ngozi having carved ravines that destroyed the irrigation system's hydraulic infrastructure. In the short term, irrigation could alternate, with some fields using water in the day and others at night. The longer-term solution was to channel water from the ravines via a large rainwater retention basin into the river.

== Drinking water ==
In 2015, with funding from the African Development Bank, a project was started to supply water from the Nyakijima River to the city of Ngozi. The water is pumped to water towers from stations near the river, chlorinated and pumped to a second tower. After this infrastructure was in place it was transferred to Regideso Burundi, the water company, who was responsible for installing the network to deliver the water. As of February 2024 this work had still not been completed.

== See also ==
- List of rivers of Burundi

== Sources ==
- "Alimentation en eau potable : un secteur presque oublié", Burundi Eco, 23 February 2024
- Descente conjointe sur terrain des Députés et des hauts cadres du ministère de l’Environnement, de l’agriculture et de l’élevage (in French), National Assembly of Burundi
- Investment opportunities in renewable energy Burundi (PDF), Minister for Energy and Mines, October 2012, p. 14
- "Lamentations des riziculteurs du marais de Nyacijima", Agence Burundais de Presse (in French), 4 January 2023
- Linke, Simon; Lehner, Bernhard; Ouellet Dallaire, Camille; Ariwi, Joseph; Grill, Günther; Anand, Mira; Beames, Penny; Burchard-Levine, Vicente; Maxwell, Sally; Moidu, Hana; Tan, Florence; Thieme, Michele (2019-12-09), "Global hydro-environmental sub-basin and river reach characteristics at high spatial resolution", Scientific Data, 6 (1), doi:10.1038/s41597-019-0300-6, ISSN 2052-4463, PMC 6901482, PMID 31819059
- Liu, Luling; Cao, Xin; Li, Shijie; Jie, Na (2024-01-24), A 31-year (1990–2020) global gridded population dataset generated by cluster analysis and statistical learning, vol. 11, doi:10.1038/s41597-024-02913-0, ISSN 2052-4463, PMC 10808219, PMID 38267476
- NASA Earth Observations: Population Density, NASA/SEDAC, archived from the original on 9 February 2016
- NASA Earth Observations Data Set Index, NASA, archived from the original on 28 November 2017
- NASA Earth Observations: Rainfall (1 month - TRMM), NASA/Tropical Rainfall Monitoring Mission, archived from the original on 19 April 2019
- NASA Earth Observations: Land Cover Classification, NASA/MODIS, archived from the original on 28 February 2016
- Ndabashinze, Rénovat (25 January 2019), "Un procédé innovateur d'irrigation pour mettre fin à la faim", Iwacu (in French)
- Ngozi (PDF), United States Government Defense Mapping Agency, 1994
