= Kabuyenge River =

River in Burundi

Kabuyenge River Runombe, Gacucu
- Location within Burundi
- Native name: Rivière Kabuyenge (French)

Location
- Country: Burundi
- Provinces: Kirundo, Muyinga

Physical characteristics
- Source
  - location: Murama, Gashoho
  - coordinates: 2°43′42″S 30°11′57″E
  - elevation: 1,664 m (5,459 ft)
- Mouth: Kanzigiri River
  - location: Bwambarangwe
  - coordinates: 2°31′2″S 30°19′53″E
  - elevation: 1,327 m (4,354 ft)
- Length: 35.4 km (22.0 mi)
- Basin size: 232.7 km^{2} (89.8 sq mi)
- Discharge
  - location: Mouth
  - average: 1.47 m^{3} (51.88 cu ft)
  - minimum: 0.463 m^{3} (16.35 cu ft)
  - maximum: 3.57 m^{3} (125.9 cu ft)

Basin features
- Progression: Kanzigiri → Lake Kanzigiri → Nyamabuno → Lake Rweru → Kagera → Lake Victoria → White Nile → Nile → Mediterranean Sea
- Population: 111,000
- Tributaries
  - left: Nyabiho, Gahahe
  - right: Kaduduri

Kabuyenge River (French: Rivière Kabuyenge) is a river in the northwest of Kirundo Province, Burundi.

== Course ==
The main tributary of the Kabuyenge River, the Kaduduri River, forms where the Rubirizi River is joined from the left by the Mirwa River. (Note: A 2012 report on investment opportunities in renewable energy in Burundi shows the Rubirizi and Kaduduri tributaries, but not the Kabuyenge.)

The Kabuyenge River forms where the Nyabiho River from the left (west) joins the Kaduduri River from the right (east). The Kabuyenge flows in a generally north-northeast direction. After being joined from the left by the Gahahe River, the combined stream is called the Gacucu River, (Note: OpenStreetMap as of September 2024 gave the name Runombe to the lower stretch, which is called Gacucu by the U.S. Defense Mapping Agency. Neither term is widely used by online sources.) a right tributary of the Kanzigiri River.

== Environment ==
The surroundings of Kabuyenge are mainly savannah. The area is densely populated, with 319 inhabitants per square kilometer. Savannah climate prevails in the area. The average annual temperature in the area is 20 °C (68 °F). The warmest month is August, when the average temperature is 24 °C (75 °F), and the coldest is January, with 18 °C (64 °F). Average annual rainfall is 1,170 millimetres (46 in). The wettest month is March, with an average of 178 millimetres (7.0 in) of precipitation, and the driest is July, with 1 millimetre (0.039 in) of precipitation.

== Marsh ==
The Kabuyenge marsh lies on the boundary between the Commune of Busoni and the Commune of Bwambarangwe, and is north of the town of Mukenke. The Köppen climate classification is Aw: Tropical savanna, wet. The Kabuyenge Marsh and the Kabanga Marsh maintain the hydrological balance of Lake Kanzigiri. The United Nations Food and Agriculture Organization (FAO) had developed buffer zones around each of these marshes.

Clay is extracted from the Kabuyenge marsh by some households to make bricks for construction. A 2005 report stated that recent drought had forced the local people to use swampy areas for crops such as rice, sorghum, bananas and colocasia. There were rice crops upstream and downstream in the Kabanga and Kabuyenge marshes. The buffer zone of the Kabuyenge marsh was being destroyed over a length of about 100 metres (330 ft).

== See also ==
- List of rivers of Burundi

== Sources ==
- Investment opportunities in renewable energy Burundi (PDF), Minister for Energy and Mines, October 2012, p. 14
- "Kabuyenge, Burundi", Mindat
- NASA Earth Observations: Population Density, NASA/SEDAC, archived from the original on 9 February 2016
- NASA Earth Observations Data Set Index, NASA, archived from the original on 28 November 2017 Temperature data from satellite measurements of the earth's surface temperature within a box that is 0,1×0,1 grader.
- NASA Earth Observations: Rainfall (1 month - TRMM), NASA/Tropical Rainfall Monitoring Mission, archived from the original on 19 April 2019 Average value for the years 2012–2014 within a box that is0,1×0,1 grader.
- NASA Earth Observations: Land Cover Classification, NASA/MODIS, archived from the original on 28 February 2016
- Nzigidahera, Benoît; Fofo, Alphonse; Misigaro, Apollinaire (August 2005), Paysage Aquatique Protege du Nord du Burundi – Etude D'identification (PDF) (in French)
- U.S. Defense Mapping Agency (1994), Rugari (PDF), University of Texas at Austin
- "Way: Kabuyenge (224724039)", OpenStreetMap
- "Way: Runombe (404253981)", OpenStreetMap
