= Nyabusyo River =

River in Burundi

- Location within Burundi
- Native name: Rivière Nyabusyo (French)

Location
- Country: Burundi

Physical characteristics
- Mouth
  - location: Nyakagezi River
  - coordinates: 3.059138°S 29.939429°E

The Nyabusyo River (French: Rivière Nyabusyo) is a river in Burundi, a tributary of the Kinyankuru River.

== Course ==
The Nyabusyo flows southwest along the border between Ngozi Province and Karuzi Province to join the Kinyankuru River from the left. The Kinyankuru is in turn a tributary of the Ruvubu River. Tributaries of the Nyabusyo include the Gashayura, Nyankezi and Tambi / Rusimbuko.

== Environment ==
The surroundings of Nyabusyo are a mosaic of farmland and natural vegetation. The area is densely populated, with 331 inhabitants per square kilometer as of 2016. The average annual temperature in the area is 20 °C (68 °F). The warmest month is September, when the average temperature is 22 °C (72 °F), and the coldest is April, with 18 °C (64 °F). Average annual rainfall is 1,149 millimetres (45.2 in). The wettest month is December, with an average of 175 millimetres (6.9 in) of precipitation, and the driest is July, with 1 millimetre (0.039 in) of precipitation.

== Marshes ==
There is a 325 hectares (800 acres) unmanaged marsh on the Nyabusyo in the Commune of Tangara, Ngozi Province. In Karuzi Province there is a 121 hectares (300 acres) unmanaged marsh on the Nyabusyo in the Commune of Bugenyuzi, and a 60 hectares (150 acres) unmanaged marsh on the Nyabusyo in the Commune of Gitaramuka.

== See also ==
- List of rivers of Burundi

== Sources ==
- Investment opportunities in renewable energy Burundi (PDF), Minister for Energy and Mines, October 2012, p. 14
- NASA Earth Observations: Population Density, NASA/SEDAC, archived from the original on 9 February 2016
- NASA Earth Observations Data Set Index, NASA, archived from the original on 28 November 2017
- NASA Earth Observations: Rainfall (1 month - TRMM), NASA/Tropical Rainfall Monitoring Mission, archived from the original on 19 April 2019
- NASA Earth Observations: Land Cover Classification, NASA/MODIS, archived from the original on 28 February 2016
- Strategie nationale de developpement de la filiere riz au Burundi (PDF) (in French), Bujumbura: Ministere de l’agriculture et de l’elevage, 2014
- "Way: Nyabusyo (224733216)", OpenStreetMap
