= List of universities in Burundi =

This is a list of universities in Burundi, as of December 2024. The list is not comprehensive.

List of universities In Burundi
Location	Name of university	Established	Type	Rank
Bujumbura	University of Burundi	1964	Public	1
Bujumbura	Université Espoir d'Afrique	2000	Private	2
Bujumbura	National Institute of Public Health	1991	Public	3
Bujumbura	Bujumbura Light University	2000	Private	4
Ngozi	University of Ngozi	1999	Public	5
Bujumbura	École Normale Supérieure de Bujumbura	1965	Public	6
Bujumbura	Bujumbura International University	2014	Private	7
Bujumbura	Université Chrétienne de Bujumbura	2015	Private	8
Bujumbura	Université des Grands Lacs	2000	Private	9
Bujumbura	Université du Lac Tanganyika	1999	Private	10
Bujumbura	École Nationale d'Administration	1966	Public	11
Bujumbura	Université Sagesse d’Afrique	2008	Private	12
Bujumbura	East Africa Star University	2014	Private	13
Gitega	Université Polytechnique de Gitega	2013	Public	14
Bujumbura	Institut Supérieur de Gestion des Entreprises	1987	Private	15
Bujumbura	International Leadership University, Burundi	2010	Private	16
Bujumbura	International University of Equator, Burundi	2016	Private	17
Kibumbu, Bujumbura	Université de Mwaro	2001	Private	18
Bujumbura	Université Martin Luther King	1999	Private	19
Cibitoke	Université Polytechnique Intégrée	2017	Private	20
Bujumbura	Université des Collines	2009	Private	
Bujumbura	Olivia University of Bujumbura	2022	Private	
Bujumbura	Summit International Institute	2017	Private	
