= Buyongwe River =

River in Burundi

- Location within Burundi
- Native name: Rivière Buyongwe (French)

Location
- Country: Burundi
- Provinces: Ngozi, Kirundo, Muyinga

Physical characteristics
- Source
  - location: Nyenzi, Gitobe
  - coordinates: 2.717561°S 30.189380°E
  - elevation: 1,665 m (5,463 ft)
- Mouth: Akanyaru River
  - location: Marangara, Ngozi
  - coordinates: 2.74780°S 29.89586°E
  - elevation: 1,368 m (4,488 ft)
- Length: 46 km (29 mi)
- Basin size: 382.7 km^{2} (147.8 sq mi)
- Discharge
  - location: Mouth
  - average: 2.91 m^{3} (102.7 cu ft)
  - minimum: 0.925 m^{3} (32.7 cu ft)
  - maximum: 6.72 m^{3} (237.4 cu ft)

Basin features
- Progression: Akanyaru River → Nyabarongo → Kagera → Lake Victoria → White Nile → Nile → Mediterranean Sea
- Population: 239,000
- Tributaries
  - left: Gisuma River

The Buyongwe River (French: Rivière Buyongwe) is a river in Burundi, a right tributary of the Akanyaru River.

== Course ==
The headwaters of the Buyongwe River are near those of the Nyamuswaga River. The Buyongwe forms in the west of Kirundo Province and flows southwest into Ngozi Province. It flows west past Kiremba, then southwest through marshes to the Akanyaru River. The Gisuma River is a left tributary of its lower reaches.

== Environment ==
The surroundings of Buyongwe River are a mosaic of farmland and natural vegetation. They are densely populated, with 442 inhabitants per square kilometer. The average annual temperature in the area is 20 °C (68 °F). The warmest month is August, when the average temperature is 22 °C (72 °F), and the coldest is March, with 18 °C (64 °F). Average annual rainfall is 1,163 millimetres (45.8 in). The wettest month is March, with an average of 191 millimetres (7.5 in) of precipitation, and the driest is July, with 2 millimetres (0.079 in) of precipitation.

== Marshes ==
The area of the present Buyongwe marshes were dominated by Syzygium, Phoenix and Macaranga trees from 2700 and 1200 years ago. Then the trees began to disappear, possibly due to exploitation by Iron Age people, and there was an increase in aquatic plants that indicates a rising water table. Papyrus swamps began to develop 700 years ago.

Today, the Buyongwe marshes are surrounded by densely populated basins, and used to grow two crops of rice per year. A 2020 report noted that most of the rice mills or hullers given to agricultural cooperatives in Burundi operate only for a very short time, particularly for the cooperatives of the Buyongwe and Nyamabuno marshes.

== See also ==
- List of rivers of Burundi

== Sources ==
- Chrétien, Jean-Pierre (2007), Afrique, terre d'histoire (PDF) (in French), Éditions KARTHALA, ISBN 978-2-84586-913-4
- Investment opportunities in renewable energy Burundi (PDF), Minister for Energy and Mines, October 2012, p. 14
- NASA Earth Observations: Population Density, NASA/SEDAC, archived from the original on 9 February 2016
- NASA Earth Observations Data Set Index, NASA, archived from the original on 28 November 2017 Temperature data from satellite measurements of the earth's surface temperature within a box that is 0.1×0.1 degrees.
- NASA Earth Observations: Rainfall (1 month - TRMM), NASA/Tropical Rainfall Monitoring Mission, archived from the original on 19 April 2019 Average value for the years 2012–2014 within a box that is 0.1×0.1 degrees.
- NASA Earth Observations: Land Cover Classification, NASA/MODIS, archived from the original on 28 February 2016
- Ngozi (PDF), United States Government Defense Mapping Agency, 1994
- Projet d’appui au développement durable des chaines de valeur de l’agriculture et de l’elevage au Burundi (PDF) (in French), Ministere de l’environnement, de l’agriculture et de l’elevage, August 2020
- Strategie de commercialisation des filieres riz, lait, maïs, banane et manioc pour renforcer le pouvoir de marche des groupements pre cooperatifs et des societes cooperatives (PDF) (in French), CAPAD, September 2017
- "Way: Buyongwe (327160741)", OpenStreetMap
