= Nyakagezi River =

River in Burundi

- Location within Burundi
- Native name: Rivière Nyakagezi (French)

Location
- Country: Burundi

Physical characteristics
- Mouth
  - location: Nyakagezi River
  - coordinates: 3.00443°S 29.93330°E

The Nyakagezi River (French: Rivière Nyakagezi) is a river in Burundi, a tributary of the Kinyankuru River.

== Course ==
The Nyakagezi rises in the south of the Sankinyinya colline of the Commune of Gahombo, Kayanza Province, and flows east. The RP52 road runs parallel to the river, south of it and north of the Ruvubu River, which also flows east. To the north of the Nyamugari Colline of the Commune of Ruhororo the Nyakagezi turns northeast. It continues east through marshes to the Kinyankuru River. It enters the Kinyankuru to the south of Rimiro colline. The Kinyankuru is in turn a tributary of the Ruvubu River.

== Environment ==
The surroundings of Nyakagezi are a mosaic of agricultural land and natural vegetation. The area is densely populated, with 442 inhabitants per square kilometer as of 2016. The average annual temperature in the area is 19 °C (66 °F). The warmest month is September, when the average temperature is 21 °C (70 °F), and the coldest is April, with 17 °C (63 °F). Average annual rainfall is 1,149 millimetres (45.2 in). The wettest month is December, with an average of 175 millimetres (6.9 in) of precipitation, and the driest is July, with 1 millimetre (0.039 in) of precipitation.

== Agriculture ==
As of 2014 there were two managed marshes on the Nyakagezi, one of 221 hectares (550 acres) divided between the Commune of Gashikanwa and the Commune of Ngozi, and the other of 108 hectares (270 acres) in the Commune of Ngozi.

== See also ==
- List of rivers of Burundi

== Sources ==
- Investment opportunities in renewable energy Burundi (PDF), Minister for Energy and Mines, October 2012, p. 14
- Mutaho (PDF), United States Government Defense Mapping Agency, 1994
- NASA Earth Observations: Population Density, NASA/SEDAC, archived from the original on 9 February 2016
- NASA Earth Observations Data Set Index, NASA, archived from the original on 28 November 2017
- NASA Earth Observations: Rainfall (1 month - TRMM), NASA/Tropical Rainfall Monitoring Mission, archived from the original on 19 April 2019
- NASA Earth Observations: Land Cover Classification, NASA/MODIS, archived from the original on 28 February 2016
- Ngozi (PDF), United States Government Defense Mapping Agency, 1994
- Strategie nationale de developpement de la filiere riz au Burundi (PDF) (in French), Bujumbura: Ministere de l’agriculture et de l’elevage, 2014
- "Way: Nyakagezi (318097355)", OpenStreetMap
