= Nyamuswaga River =

- Location within Burundi
- Native name: Rivière Nyamuswaga (French)

Location
- Country: Burundi

Physical characteristics
- Mouth
  - location: Kinyankuru River
  - coordinates: 2.969529°S 29.928293°E

The Nyamuswaga River (French: Rivière Nyamuswaga) is a river in Burundi, a tributary of the Kinyankuru River.

== Course ==
The Nyamuswaga rises in the west of Muyinga Province and flows south to the border with Ngozi Province, then in a generally southwest direction through Ngozi Province. It is a tributary of the Kinyankuru River. It joins the Nyakijima River flowing from the west to form the Kinyankuru River.

== Environment ==
The surroundings of Nyamuswaga are a mosaic of agricultural land and natural vegetation. The area is densely populated, with 442 inhabitants per square kilometer as of 2016. The average annual temperature in the area is 19 °C (66 °F). The warmest month is September, when the average temperature is 21 °C (70 °F), and the coldest is April, with 17 °C (63 °F).

Average annual rainfall is 1,149 millimetres (45.2 in). The wettest month is December, with an average of 175 millimetres (6.9 in) of precipitation, and the driest is July, with 1 millimetre (0.039 in) of precipitation.

== Agriculture ==
Since the colonial era the river's marshes have been developed to combat famine, and the effect on existing flora was not considered. As a result, most of the original vegetation has been greatly reduced or eliminated. Between 1959 and 1993 the cultivated area in the Nyamuswaga marsh rose steadily from 2,000 to 8,250 hectares (4,900 to 20,400 acres).

The Nyamuswaga and the Nyarunteke are the most important streams in the Commune of Tangara, Ngozi, where the natural vegetation has largely been cleared. The rice marshes in the Commune of Gashikanywa, Ngozi Province, on the Nyakijima and Nyamuswaga rivers covered about 500 hectares (1,200 acres) in March 2024. Heavy rains had flooded a small portion of these rice marshes. In August 2024 a group of senators visited the Nyamuswaga marshes in the Commune of Gashoho, Muyinga Province. The marshes were being developed for cultivation of sorghum to be used in producing sugar and fuel.

== See also ==
- List of rivers of Burundi

== Sources ==
- Bidou, Jean Etienne (May 1991), "Riziculture et aménagement des marais dans le Buyenzi", Colloque de Bujumbura (in French), 5 (1): 105–127
- Dushimirimana, Séverin; Masharabu, Tatien; Bizuru, Elias; Bigendako, Marie José (July 2010), "Flore et végétation naturelle des marais de Nyamuswaga, Burundi" (PDF), Bulletin Scientifique de l'Institut National Pour l'Environnement et la Conservation de la Nature (in French), 8
- Etude d'Impact Environnemental et Social des sous-projets du 5ème portefeuille du PTPGU (PDF) (in French), Ministere des transports, des travaux publics et de l’equipement, September 2013
- Manirakiza, Fabrice; Ndabashinze, Rénovat (26 March 2024), "Admicom Gashikanwa: " Nous avons perdu plus de 100 millions de Fbu "", Iwacu
- Map of Burundi, February 2016, United Nations, 3 June 2017
- NASA Earth Observations: Population Density, NASA/SEDAC, archived from the original on 9 February 2016
- NASA Earth Observations Data Set Index, NASA, archived from the original on 28 November 2017
- NASA Earth Observations: Rainfall (1 month - TRMM), NASA/Tropical Rainfall Monitoring Mission, archived from the original on 19 April 2019
- NASA Earth Observations: Land Cover Classification, NASA/MODIS, archived from the original on 28 February 2016
- Ngozi (PDF), United States Government Defense Mapping Agency, 1994
- Schéma Provincial d'Aménagement du Territoire de Ngozi (in French), URAM, 2009
- Visite des marais de Nyamuswaga et Nyavyamo ainsi que le centre agro pastoral de Mutwenzi (in French), Senate of Burundi, 21 August 2024
