= Kayava River =

River in Burundi

Kayave River Kayava
- Location within Burundi
- Native name: Rivière Kayave (French)

Location
- Country: Burundi
- Provinces: Ngozi, Kayanza

Physical characteristics
- Source
  - location: Kayanza Province, Burundi
  - coordinates: 2°52′24″S 29°29′53″E
  - elevation: 2,489 m (8,166 ft)
- Mouth: Akanyaru River
  - location: Ngozi Province, Burundi
  - coordinates: 2.818840°S 29.719262°E
  - elevation: 1,492 m (4,895 ft)
- Length: 36.8 km (22.9 mi)
- Basin size: 178 km^{2} (69 sq mi)
- Discharge
  - location: Mouth
  - average: 1.51 m^{3} (53 cu ft)
  - minimum: 0.491 m^{3} (17.3 cu ft)
  - maximum: 3.22 m^{3} (114 cu ft)

Basin features
- Progression: Akanyaru → Nyabarongo → Kagera → Lake Victoria → White Nile → Nile → Mediterranean Sea
- Population: 132,000

The Kayave River (French: Rivière Kayave) is a river in Burundi, a right tributary of the Akanyaru River.

== Course ==
The Kayave River rises in the northwest of Kayanza Province, not far from the head of the Ruvubu River, fed by streams from the Kibira National Park. It flows east to the border with Ngozi Province, and runs along the border for some distance before turning north and running through Ngozi Province to its mouth on the Akanyaru River.

== Tributaries ==
The Kayave River forms where the Ngute meets the larger Nyakimonyi and flows east, receiving the Nyabikenke, Jembegeti, Kironge from the right (south), the Nyarusasa from the left (north) and the Nkingu from the right. It turns to the north, and receives the Gitabo and Rushahuriro from the right (east), the Nkamwa and Kirimwe from the left (west) and the Rwintaro from the right just before entering the Kanyaru.

== Environment ==
The surroundings of Kayave River are a mosaic of agricultural land and natural vegetation. The area is densely populated, with 591 inhabitants per square kilometer. Savannah climate prevails in the area. The average annual temperature in the area is 19 °C (66 °F). The warmest month is September, when the average temperature is 22 °C (72 °F), and the coldest is April, with 18 °C (64 °F). Average annual rainfall is 1,163 millimetres (45.8 in). The wettest month is March, with an average of 191 millimetres (7.5 in) of precipitation, and the driest is July, with 2 millimetres (0.079 in) of precipitation.

== Agriculture ==
The Kayave River flows through the Commune of Busiga in Ngozi Province. The marshes, which have fertile clayey soils, are exploited for small-scale agriculture with crops such as cassava, sweet potato, corn, beans, banana, potato and rice.

== Events ==
In March 2021 the bridge over the Kayave River carrying the RN1 highway from Kayanza to the Kanyaru-Haut border crossing was badly damaged. This is one of the main highways between Burundi and Rwanda. As of November 2021 repairs had not started.

== See also ==
- List of rivers of Burundi

== Sources ==
- U.S. Defense Mapping Agency (1994), Kayanza (PDF), University of Texas at Austin
- "Le Burundi reste coupé du Rwanda par ses routes impraticables", Radio Publique Africaine, 10 November 2021
- Manirakiza, Dismas (2021), Impact des coopératives agricoles des cultures vivrières sur les conditions de vie des ménages ruraux au Burundi : Cas des coopératives de la province de Ngozi (PDF) (thesis) (in French), University of Liege
- NASA Earth Observations: Population Density, NASA/SEDAC, archived from the original on 9 February 2016
- NASA Earth Observations Data Set Index, NASA, archived from the original on 28 November 2017 Temperature data from satellite measurements of the earth's surface temperature within a box that is 0.1×0.1 degrees.
- NASA Earth Observations: Rainfall (1 month - TRMM), NASA/Tropical Rainfall Monitoring Mission, archived from the original on 19 April 2019 Average value for the years 2012–2014 within a box that is 0.1×0.1 degrees.
- NASA Earth Observations: Land Cover Classification, NASA/MODIS, archived from the original on 28 February 2016
- "Way: Kayave (300510256)", OpenStreetMap
