= Mugendo =

- Village
- Location within Burundi
- Coordinates: 2.5185°S 29.991°E
- Country: Burundi
- Province: Kirundo
- Commune: Commune of Ntega

Mugendo is a village in the Commune of Ntega, Kirundo Province in the north of Burundi.

== Location ==
Mugendo is in the north of the Commune of Ntega, to the northeast of Lake Narungazi. A road leads south to the communal center of Ntega. The Commune of Bugabira is to the northeast, and the Akanyaru River is to the west, forming the border between Burundi and Rwanda. The Köppen climate classification is Aw: Tropical savanna, wet.

== Events ==
A senior student left the Mugendo Communal High School to escape the sexual advances of the headmaster. In March 2023 she wrote a letter to Jean-Marie Musabanganji, the Commune's Director of Education, telling him of her situation, which had forced her to leave school. She took the headmaster to court but did not succeed. On 27 June 2023 she wrote to the Governor of Kirundo, saying the authorities had not listened to her when deciding her case. On 12 July 2023 she was detained in Ngozi Prison after judges of the Kirundo High Court accused her of "violating professional secrecy". She spent several days in prison before, after a public outcry, the Minister of Education, Dr. François Havyarimana, said that she was to be provisionally released.

In April 2023 it was reported that a public tap for drinking water had been installed near the Mugendo CDS (Health Center). Before then people from the Mugendo colline had to travel 3 to 4 kilometres (1.9 to 2.5 mi) to the water source at Muringanire, and then pay for the water, or else drink unsafe water. Now they can obtain safe water free from public taps between 10 am and 4 pm each day. Water flows freely on sunny days, but the flow weakens in cloudy weather, which can cause problems. In April 2024 Christophe Manirambona, Deputy Inspector General of the National Police of Burundi, joined the local people in maintenance of the road connecting the Ntega and Mugendo zones of the commune. He called on the people of the commune, and of the Kirundo Province, to ensure that the upcoming elections were peaceful.

== Notable person ==
Philippe Njoni is a well known person from Mugendo. He was born there in 1953. He studied at the University of Burundi from 1973 to 1977, then joined the Ministry of Education, where he worked as a teacher and school director. He worked in the national office of the Burundi Workers Union (UTB) from 1989 to 1992, then became an advisor to the cabinet of the Ministry of the Interior and Local Government. From 1993 to 2005, he was governor of Kirundo Province. From 2005 to 2010 he was Minister of Transport, Post and Telecommunications, and principal advisor to the first Vice.President of the Republic of Burundi. He died in 2017.

== Sources ==
- Bigirimana, Raphaël (5 September 2017), L'ancien ministre Philippe Njoni n'est plus, Radio Télévision Nationale du Burundi
- Burundi: Umunyeshure w'umwigeme yari yapfunzwe bikababaza bamwe bamwe yarekuwe (in Kinyarwanda), BBC, 16 July 2023
- "Kirundo: Une Autorite Scolaire Courtise Une Eleve", Radio Peace FM
- "L'accès à l'eau potable sur la colline Mugendo, des bénéfices sanitaires et économiques" (PDF), Resilience Magazine, no. 7, April 2023
- "Le ministre de l'Education doit s'impliquer pour préserver les droits des filles dans les écoles", TeleRenaissance, 18 July 2023
- "Node: Mugendo (3356061606)", OpenStreetMap, 20 September 2021
- "Mugendo, Kirundo Province, Burundi", Mindat
- "The population of Ntega commune and that of the entire province are called upon to prepare for peaceful elections", ABP: Agence Burundaise de Press, 18 April 2024
- Violation of the right to freedom of movement: arbitrary arrest and detention (PDF), SOS-Torture/Burundi
