= Nduruma River =

River in Burundi

Nduruma River Kanzigiri
- Location within Burundi
- Native name: Rivière Nduruma (French)

Location
- Country: Burundi
- Provinces: Kirundo, Muyinga

Physical characteristics
- Source: Kabuyenge River
  - location: Murama, Gashoho
  - coordinates: 2°43′42″S 30°11′57″E
  - elevation: 1,664 m (5,459 ft)
- Mouth: Lake Kanzigiri
  - location: Kirundo Province, Burundi
  - coordinates: 2.51819°S 30.32754°E
  - elevation: 1,326 m (4,350 ft)
- Length: 49.5 km (30.8 mi)
- Basin size: 420.7 km^{2} (162.4 sq mi)
- Discharge
  - location: Mouth
  - average: 2.55 m^{3} (90.12 cu ft)
  - minimum: 0.877 m^{3} (30.97 cu ft)
  - maximum: 5.98 m^{3} (211.0 cu ft)

Basin features
- Progression: Lake Kanzigiri → Nyamabuno → Lake Rweru → Kagera → Lake Victoria → White Nile → Nile → Mediterranean Sea
- Population: 180,000
- Tributaries
  - right: Gacucu

Nduruma River (French: Rivière Nduruma) is a river in the northeast of Kirundo Province, Burundi, a tributary of Lake Kanzigiri.

== Course ==
The Nduruma River forms to the north of Tongo colline in the Commune of Gitobe, where the Mukabagabaga River and Ntimba River converge. It flows northeast past Gitobe, parallel to the RP62 highway. (Note: A 2012 report on investment opportunities in renewable energy includes a map that shows the river extending beyond its source on the Defense Mapping Agency's 1994 map, then turning southwest and flowing to Lake Cohoha. The map also shows the Rurata River connecting to the point where the east and west branches of the Nduruma join, and flowing southwest into the Nyavyamo Marsh, a tributary of the Kanyaru. A closer look at the 1994 map shows that Lake Cohoha is fed by the Rugamura River, which has a tributary named Nduruma. This Nduruma has a tributary named Gasuga, which forms not far from an unnamed tributary to the main Nduruma River. The Rurata River that feeds the Nyavyamo Marsh has a tributary named Rugumba, which forms near the head of the Mukabagabaga, a tributary of the head of the Nduruma. The Nyavyamo Marsh and Lake Cogoha have tributaries that form near tributaries of the Nduruma River.)

The lower part of the Nduruma River forms the boundary between the Commune of Gitobe and Commune of Busoni. In its lower marshes, between the Shore and Buringa collines, the river takes the name Kanzigiri River, which converges with the Gacucu River marshes and feeds the south end of Lake Kanzigiri.

== See also ==
- List of rivers of Burundi

== Sources ==
- Investment opportunities in renewable energy Burundi (PDF), Minister for Energy and Mines, October 2012, p. 14
- U.S. Defense Mapping Agency (1994), Kirundo (PDF), University of Texas at Austin
- U.S. Defense Mapping Agency (1994), Lac Rweru, University of Texas at Austin
- U.S. Defense Mapping Agency (1994), Rugari (PDF), University of Texas at Austin
- "Way: Nduruma (224724040)", OpenStreetMap
