= Réverien Nzigamasabo =

Burundian politician

Governor of Kirundo Province, Burundi
- In office 2010–2015
- Preceded by: François Singayimiheto
- Succeeded by: Melchior Nankwahomba

Réverien Nzigamasabo is a politician who was governor of Kirundo Province, Burundi, from 2010 to 2015.

== Career ==
Réverien Nzigamasabo was agricultural director of Kirundo Province. In June 2009, he said that there had been a significant improvement in the current harvest compared to previous years, including the staple beans. This was caused by less violent but longer rains. Prices in some markets had dropped significantly.

In February 2013 Governors Réverien Nzigamasabo of Kirundo Province and Ildephonse Ntawunkunda of Muyinga Province led a 25-person delegation to Rwamagana, Rwanda to discuss strengthening socio-economic ties with their counterparts in Rwanda. During a press conference in May 2014 Governor Révérien Nzigamasabo denied rumours that Interahamwe militiamen affiliated with the party of Juvénal Habyarimana, former president of Rwanda, were hiding in the Commune of Bugabira. He blamed the leader of the Sahwanya-Frodebu party in Bugabira for spreading these rumours. He said the government was aware of about 400 Rwandan households in the commune, and there had been discussion with Rwanda about repatriating them.

In April 2015 Révérien Nzigamasabo, Governor of Kirundo, and Joseph Manirafasha, President of the Kira association of Kirundo natives, held a press conference in which they discussed a surge in migration of Burundians to Rwanda. They said UNHCR vehicles were waiting at the Rwandan border with rations to feed the refugees. Of these refugees, 90% were Tutsi. Manirafasha blamed the political classes of the communes of Busoni and Bugabira and the Kanyaru River region for stirring up fear about the result of the president of Burundi seeking a third term. In June 2015 a group of youths set fire to a building in Ntega holding materials for the upcoming elections. The police guarding the building were sleeping. Governor Nzigamasabo said that some of the ballot boxes and voting booths had been destroyed, but the rest was saved. The attack followed weeks of violence triggered by the decision of President Pierre Nkurunziza to run for reelection.

In November 2018 Nzigamasabo was appointed president of a commission charged with pre-selecting candidates from the National Assembly and the Senate for membership of the Truth and Reconciliation Commission.

== Sources ==
- "Burundi election materials torched days before polls", Al Jazeera, 27 June 2015
- Burundi: Longer rains boost crop yields, TNH, 8 June 2009
- Elyse Ngabire (21 April 2015), Kirundo: le Bureau du HCR au Rwanda mis en doute (in French)
- Instruction Interieure Conjointe No 130/PAN/012/2018 ... (PDF) (in French), Senate and National Assembly
- "Kirundo: Révérien Nzigamasabo denies the presence of "Interahamwe" militiamen", IGIHE, 8 May 2014
- Stephen Rwembeho (22 February 2013), "Rwanda, Burundi Provinces to Strengthen Ties", The New Times
