= University of Ngozi =

Private university in Burundi

- Université de Ngozi (French)
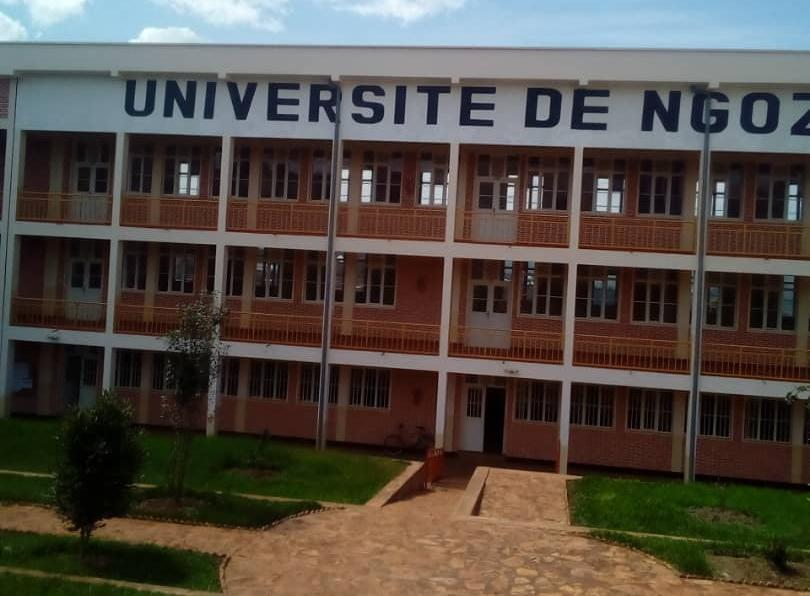
- Motto in English: "Peace, Knowledge and Development"
- Type: Private
- Established: April 17, 1999; 27 years ago
- Vice-Chancellor: Appolinaire Bangayimbaga
- Location: Ngozi, Burundi
- Campus: Urban
- Nickname: UNG
- Website: University website
- Location in Burundi

The University of Ngozi (UNG), also Ngozi University, is a private university in Burundi. It was established on 17 April 1999 by the Constituent Assembly and was approved by Ministerial Ordinance No. 530/264 on 7 May 1999.

== Location ==
The university campus is located in the city of Ngozi, in Ngozi Province in northern Burundi. This is approximately 126 kilometres (78 mi), northeast of Bujumbura, the commercial capital and largest city in the county. The university campus is located about 88 kilometres (55 mi) north of the city of Gitega, the national political capital.

This location lies off the Kayanza– Gashikanwa Road (RN6) in the north-eastern part of the city of Ngozi. The geographical coordinates of the university campus are: 2°54'16.0"S, 29°49'52.0"E (Latitude:-2.904444; Longitude:29.831111).

== Overview ==
According to its website, the University of Ngozi was established partly to address admission pressures at the University of Burundi, in Bujumbura at that time. In 1999, it is estimated that there were about 7,000 university students attending the University of Bujumbura, the only university in Burundi then, which was designed to accommodate no more than 4,000 students then.

In addition, there was an active civil war going on in Burundi. The planners' of Ngozi University, calculated that with more university positions available in the country, young people would be encouraged to pursue further education, instead of joining the civil conflict.

== Faculties ==
The university maintains the following faculties:

- Faculty of Law, Economics and Management
- Faculty of Letters, Languages, Communication an Arts
- Faculty of Medicine an Health Sciences (University Institute of Health Sciences of Ngozi)
- Faculty of Agronomics and Veterinary Sciences
- Faculty of Science and Technology

== See also ==
- List of universities in Burundi
