= Nyamabuno River =

River in Burundi

- Location within Burundi
- Native name: Rivière Nyamabuno (French)

Location
- Country: Burundi
- Provinces: Kirundo, Muyinga

Physical characteristics
- Source: Gasebuzi
  - location: Kamaramagambo, Butihinda
  - coordinates: 2°42′3″S 30°19′13″E
  - elevation: 1,584 m (5,197 ft)
- 2nd source: Gacucu
  - location: Murama, Gashoho
  - coordinates: 2°43′42″S 30°11′57″E
  - elevation: 1,664 m (5,459 ft)
- Mouth: Lake Rweru
  - location: Kirundo Province, Burundi
  - coordinates: 2.427086°S 30.393918°E
  - elevation: 1,323 m (4,341 ft)
- Length: 54.8 km (34.1 mi)
- Basin size: 740 km^{2} (286 sq mi)
- Discharge
  - location: Mouth
  - average: 4.29 m^{3} (151.6 cu ft)
  - minimum: 1.55 m^{3} (54.67 cu ft)
  - maximum: 9.92 m^{3} (350.1 cu ft)

Basin features
- Progression: Lake Rweru → Kagera → Lake Victoria → White Nile → Nile → Mediterranean Sea
- Population: 389,000
- Tributaries
  - left: Lake Kanzigiri
  - right: Muvuruga

The Nyamabuno River (French: Rivière Nyamabuno) is a river in the northeast of Kirundo Province, Burundi, a tributary of Lake Rweru.

== Course ==
The Nyamabuno River and its main tributary the Muvuruga River flow northeast, then north or northwest parallel to the Cizanye River, which defines part of Burundi's eastern border with Tanzania. For much of its course the Nyamabuno River forms the boundary between the Commune of Busoni, Kirundo Province and the Commune of Giteranyi, Muyinga Province.

The Gasebuzi, a seasonal stream in its upper reaches, forms in the Kamaramagambo colline of the Commune of Butihinda, Muyinga Province. It flows northeast, and is joined by the Rugomero seasonal stream south of Murenge to form the Muvuruga River. The Muvuruga continues north-northeast, and is joined from the left (west) by the Mukinashoza near the point where it passes under the RP61 highway.

The Muvuruga continues north through marshland, joined from the right (east) by the Gikangororo, from the left by the Murwobo, from the right by the Gashanga and Nyagafunzo, and from the left by the Kanyamanza. Towards its mouth the marshland widens, and then joins the marsh at the north end of Lake Kanzigiri. The combined marshes are joined by the marshes of the Gitandara from the right before entering Lake Rweru.

== Marsh ==
Before being cut in half by a road, the Nyamabuno Marsh was more than 400 metres (1,300 ft) wide and over 15 kilometres (9.3 mi) long. In 2005 a road about 400 metres (1,300 ft) was being built from Karambo in Kirundo Province to Ruzo, Muyinga Province through the Ruduhira marsh. The road cuts the marsh in two. The right part retains the Nyamabuno name, while the left part is called Ruduhira Marsh. The Nyamabuno and Ruduhira marshes drain the waters of Lake Rweru in the Vumasi, Rusenyi, Karambo and Nonwe watersheds.

By 2005 the start of agricultural clearing of these two marshes for rice cropping could be seen of both sides of the road. The road had caused water levels to drop, letting the local population start cultivating rice in the marsh. The road will cause progressive drying of the marshes and lowering of the lake levels. The administrator of the Bwambarangwe commune said in 2005 that an Agricultural Rehabilitation and Support Project (PRASAB) to exploit the Nyamabuno marsh had begun.

By the end of 2010 PRASAB had adapted 76 hectares (190 acres) of the Nyamabuno in the Commune of Bwambarangwe, Kirundo. for agriculture. As part of hydro-agricultural developments, the Project for productivity and development of agricultural markets (PRODEMA) would continue this work.

A 2020 report noted that most of the rice mills or hullers given to agricultural cooperatives in Burundi operate only for a very short time, particularly for the cooperatives of the Buyongwe and Nyamabuno marshes. An undated Enabel report discussed completing studies carried out by the Institutional and Operational Support Program for the Agricultural Sector (PAIOSA) in 2022 on developing 500 hectares (1,200 acres) of the Nyamabuno marsh in Bugesera for use by family farms.

== See also ==
- List of rivers of Burundi

== Sources ==
- Investment opportunities in renewable energy Burundi (PDF), Minister for Energy and Mines, October 2012, p. 14
- Nzigidahera, Benoît; Fofo, Alphonse; Misigaro, Apollinaire (August 2005), Paysage Aquatique Protege du Nord du Burundi – Etude D'identification (PDF) (in French)
- PRODEMA Analyse d’impact environnemental et social du projet (PDF) (in French), Ministere de l’agriculture et de l’elevage, September 2016
- Programme de coopération Burundi Document technique explicatif (PDF) (in French), Enabel
- Projet d’appui au développement durable des chaines de valeur de l’agriculture et de l’elevage au Burundi (PDF) (in French), Ministere de l’environnement, de l’agriculture et de l’elevage, August 2020
- U.S. Defense Mapping Agency (1994), Lac Rweru, University of Texas at Austin
- U.S. Defense Mapping Agency (1994), Rugari (PDF), University of Texas at Austin
- "Way: Nyamabuno (749089751)", OpenStreetMap
