= Buyongwe =

- Location in Burundi
- Coordinates: 2°44′50″S 29°53′35″E
- Country: Burundi
- Province: Ngozi Province

Buyongwe is a town in northern Burundi. It is located in Ngozi Province.
