= Buhoro, Burundi =

Buhoro
- village
- Location within Burundi
- Coordinates: 2.4658940°S 30.3811524°E
- Country: Burundi
- Province: Kirundo Province
- Commune: Bwambarangwe Commune
- Time zone: UTC+2 (Central Africa Time)

Buhoro is a large village in Bwambarangwe Commune, Kirundo Province, Burundi.

== Location ==
Buhoro is in the north of Bwambarangwe Commune. It is east of Lake Kanzigiri, and is connected by a road that runs south through Bunywera to the town of Mukenke. It is about 10 kilometres (6.2 mi) from Mukenke, the capital of the commune. It is the center of the Buhoro Zone.

== Health facilities ==
The village has a health center. Solar panels, with storage and an AC converter, supply power for lights, medical equipment and refrigeration. In 2013, the quality of service indicators for hygiene, maternity care and financial management of the health center were scored at around 80%. It served a target population of 19,777 as of 2017.

== Events ==
In September 2022 the commune called for bids on construction of two sheds in the Buroro market.

== Sources ==
- "552 couples have regularised their marriages in Bwambarangwe commune", Burundi News Agency, 30 April 2024
- Avis d'appel d'offres ouvert national N° DNCMP/60/T/2022-2023, relatif aux travaux de construction de 2 hangars au marché de Buhoro, en Commune BWAMBARANGWE (PDF) (in French), Commune of Bwambarangwe
- Carte Sanitaire du Burundi (PDF), Burundi Ministry of Public Health, 2016
- CDS Buhoro, Ministere de la Sante Publique et de la Lutte Contre le Sida
- EDF — electrification of 25 health centres in the provinces of Kirundo, Muyinga, Cankuzo, Ruyigi and Rutana in Burundi, Mercell, 2012
- Mbazumutima, Abbas (3 April 2020), "Burundi/Covid-19: Bwambarangwe, deux hommes conduits en quarantaine tués en cours de route", Iwacu (in French)
- "Node: Buhoro (3130287665)", OpenStreetMap
