= Serge Le Griot =

Congolese musician (born 1995)

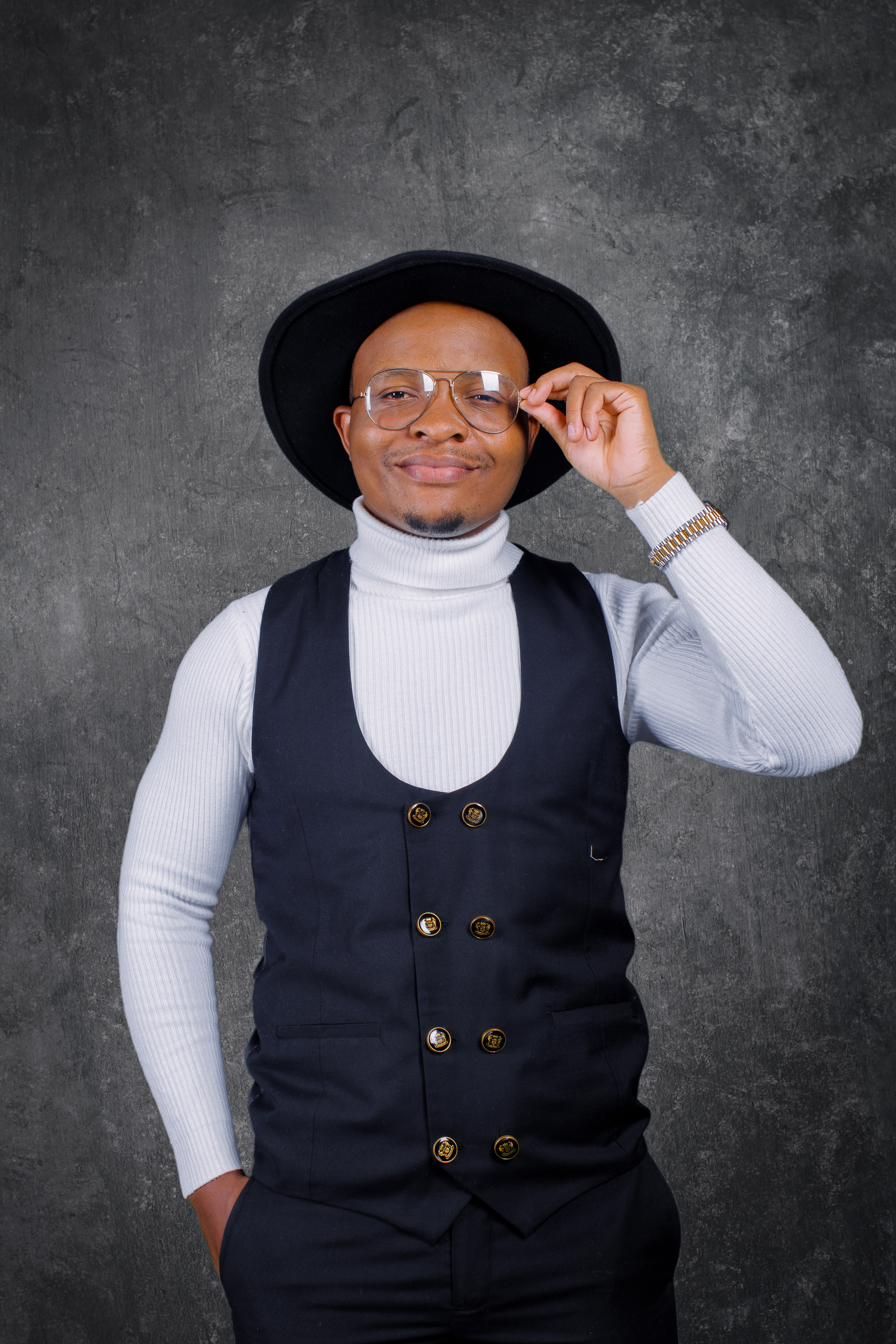
- Serge le Griot in 2021

Background information
- Born: Ngoy Lusungu Serge; 12 February 1995 (age 30); Goma, North Kivu, Democratic Republic of Congo
- Genres: Afroslamusic
- Occupations: Singer, songwriter, slammer, poet, blogger
- Instrument: Vocals
- Years active: 2014–present
- Labels: Jewe Slam

Ngoy Lusungu Serge (born 12 February 1995), better known as Serge Le Griot, is a Congolese musician, poet, songwriter, and blogger from North Kivu province.

== Biography ==
=== Childhood and education: 1995–2013 ===
Ngoy Lusungu Serge, known as "Serge Le Griot", was born on 12 February 1995 in the city of Goma (North Kivu), in the east of the Democratic Republic of the Congo. Passionate about modern poetry from an early age, he launched into the theater. After a few years in the troupe "Echos des plumes" of the cultural center of Goma, in 2014 launched into a slam to give a voice to these texts long hidden in notebooks. Two years later, he left his hometown to settle in the former Burundian capital, the city of Bujumbura, for study reasons.

=== Debut with Jewe Slam: 2016–present ===
Serge Le Griot met many artists while he was doing his bachelor in civil engineering at the Bujumbura Light University. He got to know the Chadian slammer Croque-mort, the actor and director Kader, and the French slammers Rouda and Lyor including Rouda who inspired him to create, with fourteen other slammers from the region, the collective Jewe Slam. In 2018, the collective participated for the first time in the African Cup of slam-poetry and it was consecrated ambassador of the championship in the African region of the Great Lakes.

== Discography ==
In 2018, Serge Le Griot released his very first Slam album of 6 tracks with a new style called "Afroslamusic". He thus becomes the first slam artist from Central Africa to release an album and a source of inspiration for several others which will follow. His second album entitled "Shauku" is scheduled for this year 2020.

=== Album ===
- 2020 : Shauku
  - Rumoge
  - Nous contre nous
  - Monsieur
  - Inzoga
  - Shauku
- 2018 : Griot
  - Griot
  - Slam Afrique
  - Danse d'amour
  - amour presidentiel
  - Quitter un poet
  - Tujenge Amahoro

== Honors ==
- 2016 : Winner of the young ambassadors for Peace contest named « 1000 Expressions de paix »
