= Philippe Njoni =

Burundian politician

Governor of Kirundo Province
- In office 1993–2005
- Preceded by: Déo Bizimana
- Succeeded by: François Singayimiheto

Minister of Transport, Posts and Telecommunications of Burundi
- In office 14 November 2007 – 11 August 2013
- President: Pierre Nkurunziza

Personal details
- Born: Mugendo, Commune of Ntega, Kirundo Province, Burundi
- Party: CNDD–FDD

Philippe Njoni (1953–2017) was a Burundian politician and educator. He was the former Minister of Transport, Posts and Telecommunications in Burundi, having been appointed to the position in 2007 by the former president of Burundi, Pierre Nkurunziza. His term began on 14 November 2007.

== Background ==
=== Early life ===
Njoni was born on August 12, 1953, on the Mugendo hill in the Commune of Ntega, Kirundo Province, Burundi. He was the youngest of six children born to Pierre Njoni and Marie Ndayisenga, both teachers. Njoni pursued his primary education at Mugendo Primary School and secondary education at Ntega Secondary School. He then enrolled at the University of Burundi, where he graduated with a degree in History and Geography in 1977. His academic background prepared him for a career in education and public service.

=== Political career ===
Njoni's political career spanned over three decades, during which he held various positions in the government of Burundi. He started as a teacher and later joined the Ministry of Education, where he rose by the ranks to become a director of schools. In 1992, he became an advisor to the Ministry of Interior and Local Collectivities, and later served as a supervisor at the cabinet of the Secretary of State. His leadership skills and experience led to his appointment as Governor of Kirundo Province, a position he held from 1993 to 2005. He also served as a member of the National Security Council and principal advisor to the First Vice-President of Burundi from 2005 to 2010. In 2007, he became the Minister of Transport, Posts, and Telecommunications, a position he held until 2013. His final role was as a director at the Ombudsman's office from 2011 until his passing in 2017.

Njoni held various positions throughout his career, including teacher, prefect of studies, director of schools at the Ministry of Education, advisor to the Ministry of Interior and Local Collectivities, supervisor at the cabinet of the Secretary of State, Governor of Kirundo Province, member of the National Security Council, principal advisor to the First Vice-President of Burundi, Minister of Transport, Posts, and Telecommunications, and director at the Ombudsman's office.

Njoni was a member of the Union for National Progress (UPRONA) party before joining the Burundi Democratic Front (FRODEBU) party in 2005. He served as the Secretary-General of FRODEBU from 2005 to 2010. Later, he joined the ruling party, the National Council for the Defense of Democracy–Forces for the Defense of Democracy (CNDD-FDD), in 2011.

During his career, Philippe Njoni also held various other political roles, including member of the National Security Council, principal advisor to the First Vice-President of Burundi, and Minister of Transport, Posts, and Telecommunications from 2007 to 2013.

== Personal life ==
Njoni married Marie Nyampireba in 1982, and they had five children together: three sons and two daughters. He was a devout Christian and attended the Anglican Church of Burundi.

Awards and achievements
Preceded by	Minister of Transport, Posts and Telecommunications of Burundi	Succeeded by
