= Akanyaru River =

River in Rwanda and Burundi

Akanyaru River Kanyaru
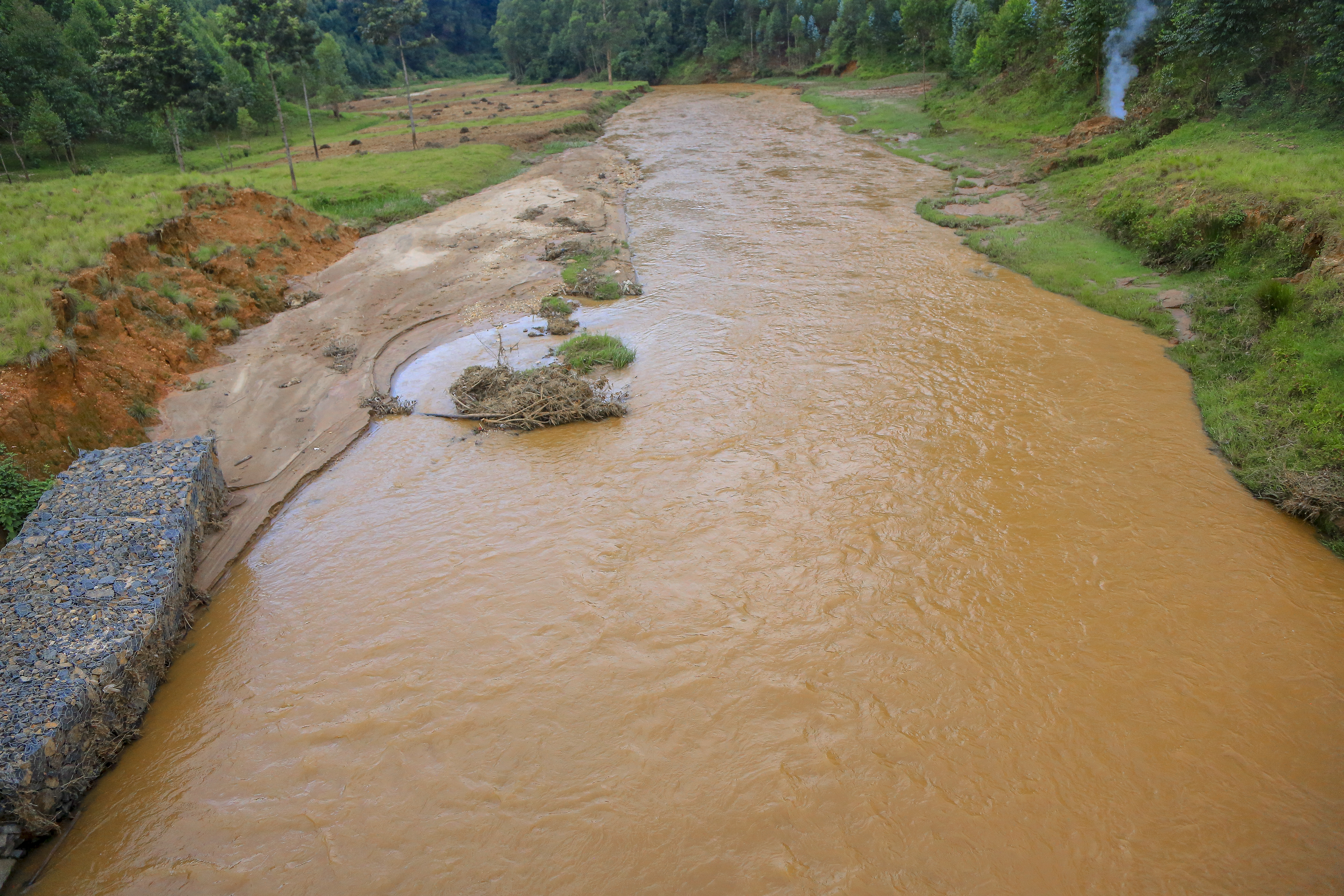

- Akanyaru River in the Kagera catchment (center)

Location
- Countries: Burundi, Rwanda

Physical characteristics
- Source
  - location: Southern Province, Rwanda
  - coordinates: 2°39′52″S 29°21′52″E
  - elevation: 2,450 m (8,040 ft)
- Mouth: Nyabarongo River
  - coordinates: 2.07504°S 30.018929°E
  - elevation: 1,348 m (4,423 ft)
- Length: 187.5 km (116.5 mi)
- Basin size: 5,406 km^{2} (2,087 sq mi)
- Discharge
  - location: Mouth
  - average: 39.91 m^{3} (1,409 cu ft)

Basin features
- Progression: Nyabarongo → Kagera → Lake Victoria → White Nile → Nile → Mediterranean Sea
- Population: 2,990,000
- Tributaries
  - right: Mwogere, Kayava, Buyongwe, Ndurumu

The Akanyaru River is the main tributary of the Nyabarongo River. It rises in the western highlands of Rwanda and Burundi, flows east and then north along the border between those countries before joining the Nyabarongo River. The lower stretches contain important but unprotected wetlands, which are under threat from human activity.

== Course ==
The Mugere River, a major headwater, rises at an elevation of 2,450 metres (8,040 ft) in Burundi. The river has sources at about 2,300 metres (7,500 ft) elevation in the south of Rwanda. Many of the valleys of the higher tributaries are choked by papyrus, which contains seasonal swamp forests. The upstream portion of the river has a catchment area of about 2,650 square kilometres (1,020 sq mi). The lower course of the river is a belt of permanent wetlands about 7 kilometres (4.3 mi) wide that ends where it reaches the Nyabarongo River. In this 80 kilometres (50 mi) stretch the river drops from an elevation of 1,465 metres (4,806 ft) to 1,400 metres (4,600 ft). The swamp belt is fed from the right by lakes Cyohoha North and Cyohoha South. The Burundi side of the swamp belt has about 14,600 hectares (36,000 acres) of permanent swamp along a 63 kilometres (39 mi) stretch of the river, with the swamp reaching 6 to 10 kilometres (3.7 to 6.2 mi) up the valleys of tributaries.

== Climate ==
The upstream part of the river basin has average annual rainfall of about 1,200 millimetres (47 in). Average annual rainfall in the wetlands is about 800 millimetres (31 in). The climate of Rwanda is determined by the Intertropical Convergence Zone, which creates two rainy seasons. One lasts from mid-September to mid-December and the other from March to May. Climate change may be increasing the severity of both floods and droughts. In the 1997-98 El Nino episode a large number of agricultural plantations in the shallows and swamps of the Nyabarongo and Akanyaru river basins were destroyed.

== Flora ==
Beside the open channels the main plants are Pistia stratiotes (water cabbage), Leersia hexandra (southern cutgrass) and Oryza barthii, a grass in the rice genus. Nearer to the shore is a combination of Typha australis, Miscanthidium violaceum, Cladium jamaicense with some papyrus. Cyperus denudatus, Cyperus latifolius and Echinochloa pyramidalis are also found in some parts. Other parts have pure stands of papyrus. The swamp forest near the river is dominated by Bridelia micrantha, Ficus verruculosa, Myrica kandtiana and Phoenix reclinata. Further from the river common species include Acacia polyacantha and Albizia gummifera.

== Fauna ==
The marshland is an area of great biodiversity, particularly of birdlife. There are records of at least 54 bird species with wetland habitats in the swamp region. These include migrant Malagasy pond heron, pallid harrier and great snipe. Lesser kestrel have been seen. The near-threatened papyrus gonolek is present as is the vulnerable papyrus yellow warbler. The sitatunga, an antelope, is found in the swamps.

== Human activities ==
The valley is not protected, and much of the land that is only flooded seasonally is cultivated at other times of the year. The local people also engage in fishing in the river and swamps. The wetlands are increasingly being used for agriculture. In the dry season the local people cut and burn the marsh vegetation, steadily destroying the habitat. In October 2005 Charles Karangwa, the Butare Director for Economic Affairs, said the people should increase their use of the Akanyaru wetland for crops, particularly maize. In February 2011 the Minister of Lands and Environment told the people of the Gisagara District to make better use of the Akanyaru swamp, with more modern farming methods. According to Minister Kamanzi the Nile Basin Initiative Cooperative Framework did not debar use. He said, "There is no agreement that prevents our population from using the water...of course in a good way."

In December 2012 the ministries of Infrastructure and Natural Resources were discussing how best to evaluate the quantity and quality of Akanyaru peat. Two companies, one from India and the other from Turkey, were to take over peat production. A 100MW peat-fired power plant was to be built by the Turkish developer Hakan Mining and Generation Industry and Trade.

== History ==
Bridge crossings on the Akanyaru River connecting to Rwanda and Burundi were among the many locations where Rwandan Tutsi refugees were massacred during the 1994 Rwandan Genocide while attempting to flee the genocide across the border with Burundi. In at least one such case, hundreds of refugees survived by jumping off the bridge into the Akanyaru River, where they swam to safety on the Burundian side of the border while Interahamwe fighters and Rwandan soldiers opened fire on civilians attempting to cross the bridge above.
