= Rurata =

- Location within Burundi

Physical characteristics
- Mouth
  - location: Kirundo Province
  - coordinates: 2.6094°S 30.0632°E

Rurata is a watercourse in Burundi. It is located in Kirundo Province, in the northern part of the country, 120 kilometers northeast of the capital Bujumbura.

== Environment ==
The surroundings around Rurata are a mosaic of farmland and natural vegetation. The area around Rurata is densely populated, with 411 inhabitants per square kilometer. A savannah climate prevails in the area. The average annual temperature in the area is 20 °C (68 °F). The warmest month is September, when the average temperature is 23 °C (73 °F), and the coldest is March, with 18 °C (64 °F). Average annual rainfall is 1,170 millimetres (46 in). The wettest month is March, with an average of 178 millimetres (7.0 in) of precipitation, and the driest is July, with 1 millimetre (0.039 in) of precipitation.

== Activities ==
In February 2014 the Ministry of Agriculture and Livestock issued a call for international tenders for construction of a number of water works, including water supply works upstream of reservoir on arms of the Rurata and other rivers. They called for tenders for construction of intake structures and regulators for the Rurata watercourse and others.

In 2015 the RP64 Rurata-Ntega road was being rehabilitated by Paiosa, a Belgian Technical Cooperation program.

In September 2018 it was reported that people were protesting about the way a bridge in the Rurata area was being rebuilt, more than three months after it was destroyed. The contract had been awarded without a call for tender, and the contractor was not qualified to do the job. The bridge is on the Bujumbura–Kirundo national road RN14. It is in Rurata, 5 kilometers from the road junction which goes to the Ntega commune and that which goes to the capital of the Kirundo commune.

In November 2021 Cyriaque Nshimirimana, Second Deputy-Speaker of the Senate of Burundi, who represented the Kirundo constituency, met leaders of the province in the capital of the Commune of Ntega. His audience included heads of provincial and municipal services, colline chiefs, leaders of the Sangwe cooperatives and religious leaders. Concerns raised by the audience included the need to repair the Rurata–Ntega road.

== Sources ==
- Avis d’Appel d’Offres International Projet N° : P-Z1-ABO-005 (PDF)
- Avis d’Appel d’Offres International ouvert PROJET N° P-Z1-ABO-005 (PDF)
- Bukeyeneza, Armel-Gilbert; Ngabire, Elyse (29 January 2015), "Kirundo : vers l'accalmie politique", Iwacu
- La population de la province Kirundo interpellée à préserver la paix et la sécurité (in French), Senate of Burundi, 29 November 2021
- "Les habitants de Rurata dénoncent le clientélisme dans l'octroi du marché de réhabilitation d'un pont", Radio Publique Africaine, 10 September 2018
- NASA Earth Observations Data Set Index, NASA, archived from the original on 11 May 2020 Temperature data from satellite measurements of the earth's surface temperature within a box that is 0.1×0.1 degrees.
- NASA Earth Observations: Land Cover Classification, NASA/MODIS, archived from the original on 28 February 2016
- NASA Earth Observations: Population Density, NASA/SEDAC, archived from the original on 9 February 2016
- NASA Earth Observations: Rainfall (1 month - TRMM), NASA/Tropical Rainfall Monitoring Mission, archived from the original on 19 April 2019 Average value for the years 2012–2014 within a box that is 0.1×0.1 degrees.
- "Rurata", geonames
