= Commune of Nyamurenza =

Coordinates: 2°47′39″S 29°52′26″E

- Commune
- Interactive map of Commune of Nyamurenza
- Country: Burundi
- Province: Ngozi Province
- Administrative center: Nyamurenza
- Time zone: UTC+2 (Central Africa Time)

The commune of Nyamurenza is a commune of Ngozi Province in northern Burundi. The capital lies at Nyamurenza.
