= Kayongozi River =

River in Burundi

- Location within Burundi
- Native name: Rivière Kayongozi (French)

Location
- Country: Burundi
- Provinces: Cankuzo, Ruyigi

Physical characteristics
- Source
  - location: Cankuzo Province
  - coordinates: 2°57′40″S 30°35′5″E
  - elevation: 1,628 m (5,341 ft)
- Mouth: Rurubu River
  - location: Ruyigi Province
  - coordinates: 3.24408°S 30.25710°E
  - elevation: 1,368 m (4,488 ft)
- Length: 66.9 km (41.6 mi)
- Basin size: 819.4 km^{2} (316.4 sq mi)
- Discharge
  - location: Mouth
  - average: 6.35 m^{3} (224.3 cu ft)
  - minimum: 1.88 m^{3} (66.39 cu ft)
  - maximum: 15.46 m^{3} (545.9 cu ft)

Basin features
- Progression: Rurubu → Kagera → Lake Victoria → White Nile → Nile
- Population: 144,000

The Kayongozi River (French: Rivière Kayongozi) is a river in Burundi, a right tributary of the Rurubu River.

== Course ==
The Kayongozi River forms near the border with Tanzania in the north of Cankuzo Province, then flows southwest into Ruyigi Province. It continues southwest, then turns to flow northwest to it mouth on the Ruvubu River. Tributaries include the Nyamashishi and the Rugasari.

== Environment ==
The surroundings of the Kayongozi River are mainly covered in savanna forest. The area is quite densely populated, with 111 inhabitants per square kilometer as of 2016. The average annual temperature in the area is 19 °C (66 °F). The warmest month is September, when the average temperature is 22 °C (72 °F), and the coldest is April, with 18 °C (64 °F). Average annual rainfall is 1,321 millimetres (52.0 in). The rainiest month is December, with an average of 215 millimetres (8.5 in) of precipitation, and the driest is July, with 1 millimetre (0.039 in) of precipitation.

== Marshes ==
The Kayongozi basin contains 3,410 hectares (8,400 acres) of marshland, of which 1,979 hectares (4,890 acres), or 58%, had been developed as of 1998.

== Hydroelectricity ==
The Kayongozi Small Hydropower Plant in Ruyigi with 500kW was initiated in 2013, to be operated by the Rural Electrification Agency (ABER). The Kayongozi micro-hydroelectric power plant in Ruyigi was inaugurated on 18 December 2014. A 2012 report listed three other potential hydroelectric sites on the river: KAYO 028, with 2.5MW, KAYO 027 with 2.5MW and KAYO 002 with 1.8MW.

== Events ==
In July 2024 the log bridge over the Kayongozi River which links the Kavumu and Murehe collines of the Commune of Cankuzo, Cankuzo Province, was almost unusable. Commerce was disrupted and children had dropped out of school. The provincial governor was aware of the problem, but did not have the budget for a modern bridge. In the meantime he recommended that the residents do what they could to repair the bridge using wood.

== See also ==
- List of rivers of Burundi

== Sources ==
- Investment opportunities in renewable energy Burundi (PDF), Minister for Energy and Mines, October 2012, p. 14
- "Le pont de la rivière Kayongozi se trouve dans un état de délabrement", Agence Burundaise de Presse (in French), 7 August 2024
- Linke, Simon; Lehner, Bernhard; Ouellet Dallaire, Camille; Ariwi, Joseph; Grill, Günther; Anand, Mira; Beames, Penny; Burchard-Levine, Vicente; Maxwell, Sally; Moidu, Hana; Tan, Florence; Thieme, Michele (2019-12-09), "Global hydro-environmental sub-basin and river reach characteristics at high spatial resolution", Scientific Data, 6 (1), doi:10.1038/s41597-019-0300-6, ISSN 2052-4463, PMC 6901482, PMID 31819059
- Liu, Luling; Cao, Xin; Li, Shijie; Jie, Na (2024-01-24), A 31-year (1990–2020) global gridded population dataset generated by cluster analysis and statistical learning, vol. 11, doi:10.1038/s41597-024-02913-0, ISSN 2052-4463, PMC 10808219, PMID 38267476
- NASA Earth Observations: Population Density, NASA/SEDAC, archived from the original on 9 February 2016
- NASA Earth Observations Data Set Index, NASA, archived from the original on 28 November 2017 Temperature data from satellite measurements of the earth's surface temperature within a box that is 0.1 x 0.1 degrees.
- NASA Earth Observations: Rainfall (1 month - TRMM), NASA/Tropical Rainfall Monitoring Mission, archived from the original on 19 April 2019 Average value for the years 2012–2014 within a box that is 0.1 x 0.1 degrees
- NASA Earth Observations: Land Cover Classification, NASA/MODIS, archived from the original on 28 February 2016
- "Politique, Économie, Société … : le bilan de…", Burundi Forum (in French), 5 July 2015
- Schema directeur d’amenagement et de mise en valeur des marais (PDF) (in French), Bujumbura: FAO / PNUD, September 2000
- "Way: Kayongozi (343213021)", OpenStreetMap
- "Eastern Africa", World Small Hydropower Development Report 2022 (PDF), United Nations Industrial Development Organization and International Center on Small Hydro Power, 2022
