= Commune of Bwambarangwe =

- Commune
- Location within Burundi
- Coordinates: 2°33′09″S 30°20′27″E
- Country: Burundi
- Province: Kirundo Province
- Administrative center: Mukenke
- Time zone: UTC+2 (Central Africa Time)

The Commune of Bwambarangwe is a commune of Kirundo Province in northern Burundi.

== Location ==
The Commune of Bwambarangwe has an area of 193.0 square kilometres (74.5 sq mi) and had a population of 66,816 as of the 2008 census. Bwambarangwe is in the east of Kirundo Province. It extends southwest from the southeast of Lake Rweru. The Commune of Busoni and Commune of Gitobe are to its west. Muyinga Province is to its east.

== Environment ==
Lake Kanzigiri is on the boundary between the Commune of Bwambarangwe to the east and the Commune of Busoni to the west. It lies to the south of Lake Rweru, to which it is connected by an area of marshland. The settlement of Bunwera is to the east of its southern point. Bwambarangwe is to the south. Around Lake Kanzigiri there are wooded savannahs dominated by plants such as Pericopsis angolensis, Parinari curatellifolia and Hymenocardia acida, which indicate Zambezian influences. These eastern savannas are mainly found in the Ruvubu National Park, which indicates that Lake Kanzigiri and the marshes associated with it are a zone of separation between the Bugesera District and the Mosso-Malagarazi District.

== Administrative divisions ==
There is a hospital and health center in Mukenke, and health centers in Bugorora, Kimeza, Kibazi and Buhoro. The health centers at Buhoro and Mukenke have solar panels, with storage and an AC converter, which supply power for lights, medical equipment and refrigeration.

The commune has four zones: Buhoro, Mukenke, Kimeza and Bugorora. It is divided into 17 collines, from north to south:

- Karambo
- Rusara
- Buhoro
- Bunywera
- Minyago
- Kibazi
- Gasave
- Budahunga
- Ruyenzi
- Mugongo
- Kimeza
- Mukenke
- Butegana
- Buhevyi
- Mutarishwa
- Bugorora
- Kibonobono

== Politics ==
In April 2014 Jean Marie Muhigwa, administrator of the commune of Bwambarangwe, stated that unlike other communes of Kirundo Province, the administration had worked to bring together supporters of different political parties. Two youth football teams had been formed, one with supporters of the ruling CNDD/FDD party and the opposition FNL and MSD (Note: The MSD was suspended for four months in March 2014 after clashes in the capital between party youth and police. In April 2017 the MSD was suspended for six months.) parties, and the other with supporters of the UPRONA, FRODEBU, FRODEBU-Nyakuri and civil society. Young people of different parties also met in income-generating activities, and regular meetings were held to raise awareness of the importance of political tolerance.

On 4 September 2019 it was reported that two days earlier Fébronie Niyingabire, Administrator of Bwambarangwe Commune, had summoned three young girls to the Bwambarangwe Communal office, where she slapped them and beat them with a stick. One of the girls was hospitalized. Their offense seems to have been attending dance rehearsals for the opening ceremonies of the office of the CNL party, which they had supported since the period when they lived in the Rukore refugee camp in Tanzania.

In May 2022 the president of the CNL in the commune of Bwambarangwe asked the commune administrator for approval of a festival at the commune level to celebrate the third anniversary of the party's approval. The administrator refused, on the grounds that the celebration was a form of propaganda, and anyway the anniversary had been celebrated nationally on 20 February.

== Other events ==
After the crisis of October 1993, when a group of soldiers assassinated President Melchior Ndadaye, Hutu extremists began to attack Tutsi in Bwambarangwe, looting, raping and killing both women and men. More than 400 died, while others took refuge in the communal center in Mukenke. The military intervened, and in some cases committed acts of violence against the Hutu, some of whom fled to foreign countries, particularly Tanzania. Since then efforts have been made to restore calm in Bwambarangwe, including the Kigobe and Kajaga agreements and peace meetings in the collines.

In November 2021 Cyriaque Nshimirimana, Second Deputy Speaker of the Senate, visited the province of Kirundo. On the second day of his visit he visited Mukerwa zone, Commune of Busoni, to assist in construction of the modern football stadium that was being built in Renga village. Later that day a meeting to discuss socio-economic and security issues was held in the town of Busoni with administrative and religious leaders of the Busoni, Bwambarangwe and Gitobe communes. During a presentation on what Sangwe cooperatives had achieved in those communes, it was noted that those in Gitobe had been successful, and those in the other two communes less so. Issues raised included the need to repair the Gasura–Gitobe road, the need for a market for selected corn and bean seeds, and the need for artificial insemination of livestock.

In July 2022 Édouard Nduwimana, Ombudsman of Burundi, visited the Bwambarangwe commune to discuss concerns with the people. He heard complaints that included failure of the administration, police and courts to manage conflicts, arrears in payments by the municipality to the Institut National de la Sécurité Sociale (INSS) for their employees, and the lack of return packages for people returning from exile. Later the ombudsman organized football matches in Busoni commune's Nyarunazi stadium between teams of repatriated youth and teams of non-exiled youth.

In April 2024 the commune launched a drive to formalize common law marriages, and held a ceremony where 552 couples regularized their marriage. Fabrice Ciragiye, permanent secretary of the commune, urged people to stop common law marriages, and also to limit births.

== Sources ==
- "552 couples have regularised their marriages in Bwambarangwe commune", Burundi News Agency, 30 April 2024
- Barangenza, Laurent (20 July 2022), La population de Bwambarangwe exprime ses préoccupations devant l'ombudsman, Radio Télévision Nationale du Burundi
- "BURUNDI: Administrative Division", City Population
- "Burundi / Kirundo / Bwambarangwe", GADM
- "Burundi suspends activities of MSD opposition party", Africanews, 15 April 2017
- Bwambarangwe devenue un modèle de cohabitation pacifique des partis politiques, Coalition de la société civile pour le monitoring électoral (SOSOME), 28 April 2014
- Carte Sanitaire du Burundi (PDF), Burundi Ministry of Public Health, 2016
- EDF — electrification of 25 health centres in the provinces of Kirundo, Muyinga, Cankuzo, Ruyigi and Rutana in Burundi, Mercell Norge AS
- Fiche descriptive sur les zones humides Ramsar (FDR) (PDF) (in French), 14 March 2013
- Mugisha, Hervé (16 May 2022), "Bwambarangwe : célébration de l'anniversaire du CNL annulée, le député Bizimungu du CNL indigné", Iwacu
- Mugwaneza, Ernest (June 2016), La Crise d’Octobre 1993 en Commune de Bwambarangwe (Mars 1992-avril 1994) (PDF) (thesis)
- "Relation: Bwambarangwe (2985686)", OpenStreetMap
- "Relation: Lac Kanzigiri (2031514)", Open Street Map
- Residents of Busoni, Bwambarangwe and Gitobe communes called on to buckle down to development work, Senate of Burundi, 2021
- United States. Foreign Broadcast Information Service (1982). Sub-Saharan Africa report. Foreign Broadcast Information Service.
- Uwimana, Diane (4 September 2019), Three young girls beaten in Bwambarangwe, IWACU Engolish News
