= François Singayimiheto =

Governor of Kirundo Province, Burundi
- In office 2005–2010
- Preceded by: Philippe Njoni
- Succeeded by: Réverien Nzigamasabo

François Singayimiheto is a politician who was governor of Kirundo Province, Burundi, from 2005 to 2010.

== Career ==
François Singayimiheto is a Tutsi. He was born in 1966. He was a candidate for election to represent Kirundo in the legislature in 2005 as a member of the National Council for the Defense of Democracy – Forces for the Defense of Democracy (CNDD-FDD) party.. He was appointed governor of Kirundo Province that year. He was the first governor of Kirundo to belong to the CNDD-FDD.

During his term of office, in 2006 Burundi was hit by drought, and Kirundo was affected the worst. Singayimiheto called on aid organizations to provide more help. He noted that some families had fled to Rwanda in search of food, but had found it was also affected by drought, and had returned home. They were depending on aid from the World Food Programme.

In November 2021 Singayimiheto attended a meeting of former and current leaders of the party in Kirundo, also attended by former and current commune administrators. The provincial secretary of the CNDD-FDD, Jean Claude Mbarushimana, addressed the meeting. Other attendees were Marie Claire Kirimutumye, the first provincial secretary and Jean Baptiste Nzigamasabo, a former deputy for Kirundo.

== Sources ==
- "Annexe 1 – Institutions au Burundi (Situation au 1er Mai 2006)" (PDF), L'Afrique des Grands Lacs. Annuaire (in French), 2006
- Burundians flee to Tanzania to escape drought, Reuters, 16 January 2006
- Listes des Candidats aux Législatives 2005 (PDF), Independent National Electoral Commission, 2005
- The CNDD-FDD activists in Kirundo province are called on to remain united, Burundi News Agency, 17 November 2021
