= Mwogere River =

River in Burundi

Mwogere River Umwogere
- Location within Burundi
- Native name: Rivière Mwogere (French)

Location
- Country: Burundi
- Province: Kayanza

Physical characteristics
- Source
  - coordinates: 2°51′55″S 29°29′08″E
  - elevation: 2,408 m (7,900 ft)
- Mouth: Akanyaru River
  - coordinates: 2.807382°S 29.606196°E
  - elevation: 1,632 m (5,354 ft)
- Length: 23.1 km (14.4 mi)
- Basin size: 93.5 km^{2} (36.1 sq mi)
- Discharge
  - location: Mouth
  - average: 0.791 m^{3} (27.9 cu ft)
  - minimum: 0.261 m^{3} (9.2 cu ft)
  - maximum: 1.640 m^{3} (57.9 cu ft)

Basin features
- Progression: Akanyaru → Nyabarongo → Kagera → Lake Victoria → White Nile → Nile → Mediterranean Sea
- Population: 55,800

The Mwogere River (French: Rivière Mwogere) is a river in Kayanza Province, Burundi, a right tributary of the Akanyaru River.

== Course ==
The Mwogere River flows through the Commune of Kabarore in the north of Kayanza Province, which is in the north of Burundi.

The Mwogere, or Umwogere, rises in Rwanda to the east of Remera and to the east and south of the NR9 highway. It enters Burundi north of the Buvumo colline, and flows southeast along the border. (Note: To the west of the Mwogere the Buyumpu River flows west along the border. It is a tributary of the Kaburantwa River in the Lake Tanganyika watershed.) It runs along the border north of the Rusagara and Kidunduri collines, leaves the border at an elevation of 1,912 metres (6,273 ft) and turns south and then west past the south of the Munege colline.

The Mwogere is joined by the Nyakavuvu from the left (north) at 1,785 metres (5,856 ft), then by the Nayandara from the right (south) at 1,744 metres (5,722 ft) in an area of marshes. It turns north and flows between the Ryamukona colline to the west and the Runyinya colline to the east to join the Kanyaru at 1,619 metres (5,312 ft).

== Environment ==
The surroundings of the Mwogere River are a mosaic of farmland and natural vegetation. The area is densely populated, with 476 inhabitants per square kilometer. The average annual temperature in the area is 19 °C (66 °F). The warmest month is August, when the average temperature is 22 °C (72 °F), and the coldest is April, with 16 °C (61 °F). Average annual rainfall is 1,163 millimetres (45.8 in). The wettest month is March, with an average of 191 millimetres (7.5 in) of precipitation, and the driest is July, with 2 millimetres (0.079 in) of precipitation.

== Mining ==
There are coltan (Note: Tantalum from coltan is used to manufacture tantalum capacitors which are used for mobile phones, personal computers, automotive electronics, and cameras.) deposits in the Ryamukona colline, near the river's mouth, which attract artisanal miners. The waste water from coltan mining is dumped into the river. It contains coltan, which is extracted from the river, causing large disturbances in the river's bed and flow. In January 2017 1,077.4 kilograms (2,375 lb) of coltan were seized in Kiziba, Kabarore commune. One Burundian and eleven Rwandans were arrested as they were getting ready to cross the Mwogere River border on the way to Gisenyi, Nyaruguru district in Rwanda.

== Hydroelectricity ==
The hydroelectric potential of the river was evaluated in 2017 in the Ryamukona colline. There would be demand for electricity from small businesses serving the miners, and from public infrastructure in the collines along the river such as primary schools and health centers. The nominal measured flow rate was 118 cubic metres per second (4,200 cu ft/s) and the hydroelectric potential is about 82kW. In July 2018 the national development plan included developing a 700kW micropower plants on the Mwogere. In 2021 the Kayanza Province was planning to construct a micro hydroelectric power station on the Mwogere River in Kabarore commune.

== See also ==
- List of rivers of Burundi

== Sources ==
- Barangenza, Laurent (2 October 2021), "La province Kayanza s'engage sur la voie du développement", Radio Télévision Nationale du Burundi (in French)
- Commodity Report 2008: Tantalum (PDF), United States Geological Survey
- Investment opportunities in renewable energy Burundi (PDF), Minister for Energy and Mines, October 2012, p. 14
- NASA Earth Observations: Population Density, NASA/SEDAC, archived from the original on 9 February 2016
- NASA Earth Observations Data Set Index, NASA, archived from the original on 10 May 2020
- NASA Earth Observations: Rainfall (1 month - TRMM), NASA/Tropical Rainfall Monitoring Mission, archived from the original on 19 April 2019
- NASA Earth Observations: Land Cover Classification, NASA/MODIS, archived from the original on 28 February 2016
- Niyonzima, Jean Bosco; Hendrick, Patrick (2020), "Mesures du débit de la rivière Mwogere au moulinet hydrométrique par la méthode des points de vitesse", Journal of Renewable Energies (in French), vol. 23, pp. 109–132, doi:10.54966/jreen.v23i1.36
- Nkurunziza, Dieudonné (13 January 2017), "1077,4 kg de coltan et cassitérite saisis à la frontière Rwando-burundaise", Radio Télévision Nationale du Burundi (in French)
- Programmes d’actions prioritaires (PDF) (in French), Bujumbura: Comite technique d’elaboration du plan national de developpement, July 2018
- U.S. Defense Mapping Agency (1994), Kayanza (PDF), University of Texas at Austin
- U.S. Defense Mapping Agency (1994), Ndora (PDF), University of Texas at Austin
- "Way: Mwogere (389048351)", OpenStreetMap
