= Commune of Kiremba =

Coordinates: 2°49′33″S 29°59′02″E

- Commune
- Interactive map of Commune of Kiremba
- Country: Burundi
- Province: Ngozi Province
- Administrative center: Kiremba
- Time zone: UTC+2 (Central Africa Time)

The commune of Kiremba is a commune of Ngozi Province in northern Burundi. The capital lies at Kiremba.
