= Ntega =

- Village
- Location within Burundi
- Coordinates: 2.6085°S 29.9945°E
- Country: Burundi
- Province: Kirundo
- Commune: Commune of Ntega

Ntega is a large village, the seat of the Commune of Ntega, Kirundo Province in the north of Burundi.

== Location ==
Ntega is at the west end of the RP64 road, which connects at its east end to the RN14 highway, leading north to the city of Kirundo. A road leads south to Marangara and another road leads north to Lake Narungazi and Mugendo. The Köppen climate classification is Aw: Tropical savanna, wet.

In 2015 the RP64 Rurata–Ntega road was being rehabilitated by Paiosa, a Belgian Technical Cooperation program. In November 2021 Cyriaque Nshimirimana, Second Deputy-Speaker of the Senate of Burundi, met leaders of the province in the Ntega. His audience included heads of provincial and municipal services, colline chiefs, leaders of the Sangwe cooperatives and religious leaders. Concerns raised by the audience included the need to repair the Rurata–Ntega road.

== Sources ==
- Bukeyeneza, Armel-Gilbert; Ngabire, Elyse (29 January 2015), "Kirundo : vers l'accalmie politique", Iwacu
- La population de la province Kirundo interpellée à préserver la paix et la sécurité (in French), Senate of Burundi, 29 November 2021
- "Node: Ntega (3039360935)", OpenStreetMap
- "Ntega, Kirundo Province, Burundi", Mindat
