= Commune of Marangara =

Coordinates: 2°42′32″S 29°58′12″E

- Commune
- Interactive map of Commune of Marangara
- Country: Burundi
- Province: Ngozi Province
- Administrative center: Marangara
- Time zone: UTC+2 (Central Africa Time)

The commune of Marangara is a commune of Ngozi Province in northern Burundi. The capital lies at Marangara.

== See also ==
Commune of Busiga
