= Cizanye River =

River in Burundi

- Location within Burundi
- Native name: Rivière Cizanye (French)

Location
- Country: Burundi

Physical characteristics
- Mouth
  - location: Rurubu River
  - coordinates: 2.654232°S 30.526403°E

The Cizanye River (French: Rivière Cizanye) is a river in Burundi, a tributary of the Rurubu River.

== Course ==
The Cizanye River flows northeast through Muyinga Province to the border with Tanzania. Near the border it is joined from the right by the Rugobe River. It then turns east and defines the border to its mouth on the Ruvubu River, which leaves Burundi at this point.

== Marshes ==
As of 2014 there was a 115 hectares (280 acres) rehabilitated managed marsh on the Cizanye near Kobero, Commune of Butihinda, Muyinga Province, and a 120 hectares (300 acres) unmanaged marsh in the Commune of Muyinga.

In July 2018 Déo Guide Rurema, Burundian Minister of Agriculture, launched the "C" growing season in the Commune of Butihinda in the 55 hectares (140 acres) Cizanye marsh. This was to introduce the idea of growing crops in the marsh during the dry season, irrigated with river water.

== See also ==
- List of rivers of Burundi

== Sources ==
- "Burundi : L'Etat lance la saison culturale C2018", AGnews (in French), 15 July 2018
- Investment opportunities in renewable energy Burundi (PDF), Minister for Energy and Mines, October 2012, p. 14
- Rugari (PDF), US Government Defense Mapping Agency, 1994
- Strategie nationale de developpement de la filiere riz au Burundi (PDF) (in French), Bujumbura: Ministere de l’agriculture et de l’elevage, 2014
