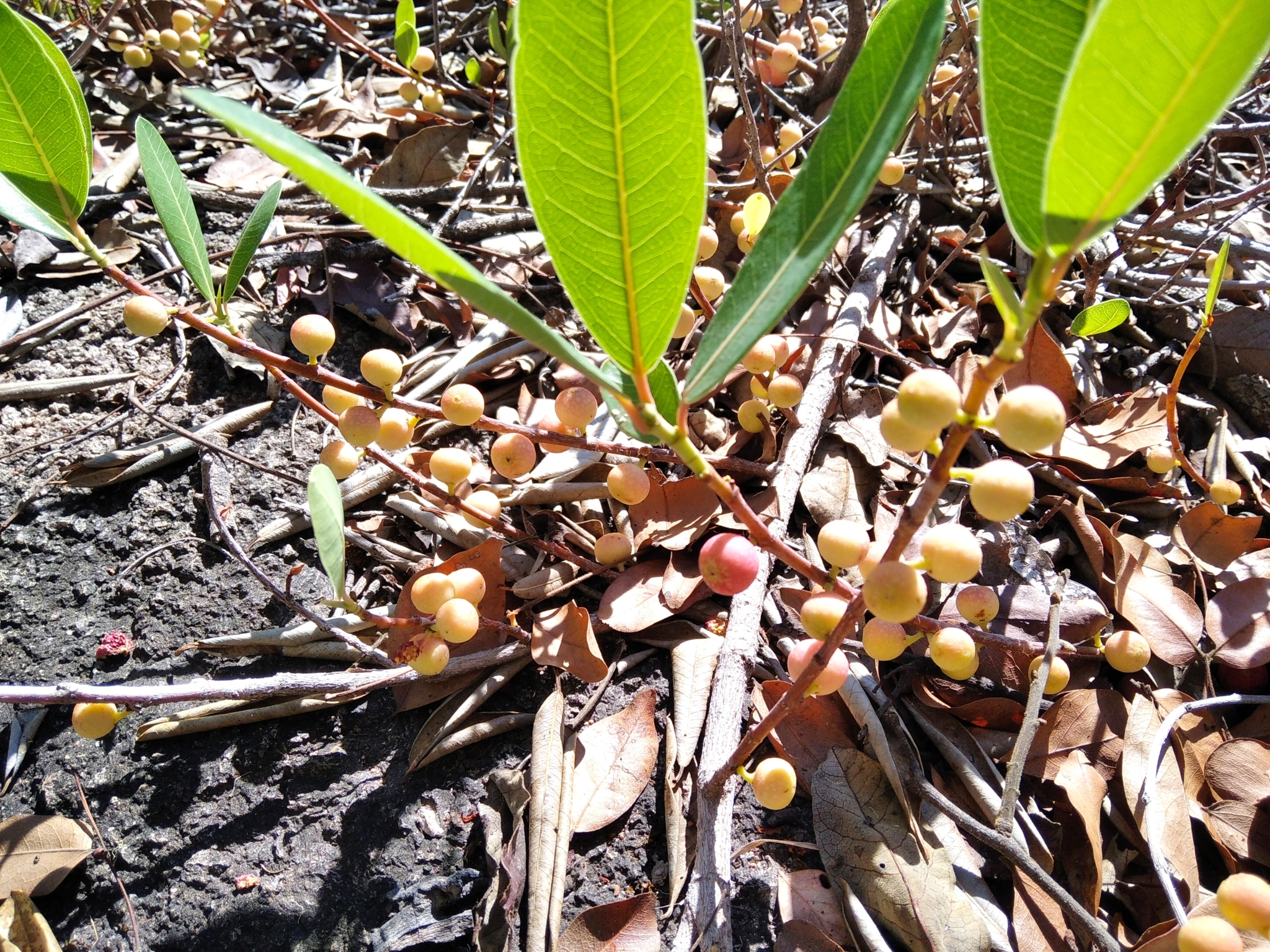

Conservation status
- Least Concern (IUCN 3.1)

Scientific classification
- Kingdom: Plantae
- Clade: Tracheophytes
- Clade: Angiosperms
- Clade: Eudicots
- Clade: Rosids
- Order: Rosales
- Family: Moraceae
- Tribe: Ficeae
- Genus: Ficus
- Species: F. verruculosa

Binomial name
- Ficus verruculosa Warb.

Synonyms
- Ficus praeruptorum Hiern; Ficus verruculosa var. stipitata Mildbr. & Burret

= Ficus verruculosa =

Species of flowering plant

Ficus verruculosa, the water fig, is a species of fig from sub-saharan Africa.

It is native to tropical and southern Africa, ranging from KwaZulu-Natal in South Africa through northern Botswana and the Caprivi Strip to Angola, to Kenya in the northeast, and west to Nigeria, Niger, Mali, and Guinea. It grows in riverine and swamp fringes or grassland, always near water. It is pollinated by the wasp Platyscapa binghami.

The growth form of Ficus verruculosa is as a shrub, or weak-stemmed, sparsely branched shrub 0.2-0.6 m tall, less often a small tree up to 12m, often forming low, creeping thickets. Leaves oblong to lanceolate, 3.5-20 x 1.5-8.5 cm, leathery, hairless. Figs are produced mostly in pairs in leaf axils, greenish when unripe, ripening to red and are fed on by African green pigeons Treron calvus.
