= Cyperus denudatus =

Scientific classification
- Kingdom: Plantae
- Clade: Tracheophytes
- Clade: Angiosperms
- Clade: Monocots
- Clade: Commelinids
- Order: Poales
- Family: Cyperaceae
- Genus: Cyperus
- Species: C. denudatus

Binomial name
- Cyperus denudatus L.f.

Species of sedge

Cyperus denudatus, commonly known as the winged sedge, is a species of sedge that is native to parts of Africa, Asia and eastern parts of Australia.

The species was first described in 1782 by Carl Linnaeus the Younger.

== See also ==
- List of Cyperus species
