= Hills University =

Private university in Bujumbura, Burundi

- Université des Collines (French)
- Type: Private
- Established: 2009; 17 years ago
- Location: Bujumbura, Burundi
- Campus: Urban
- Nickname: UDC
- Website: University website

Hills University (in French called "Université des Collines") is a private university founded in 2009 in Bujumbura, Burundi, recognized by the Ministry of Education.

== Background ==
According to the McKinsey Global Institute, Africa is projected to be the world's second-fastest growing economy by 2020. With growth comes a need for leaders who can address and navigate challenges and opportunities. UC strives to contribute to the region's human and economic development by educating leaders committed to making an impact on the continent.

== Courses ==
UC's African MBA program includes: 100% online and learning on the go with iOS & Android apps; certificates highlighting new skills & achievements; video lectures from world-renowned instructors; instant feedback and auto-graded assignments, engaging discussion forums and progress tracking & real-time analytics. UC measures the impact of its program with advanced tools and detailed analytics. By following their progress, UC can help students learn more efficiently and effectively. UC has created customized programs aligned with its student's exact needs. UC's Learning & Development Programs help push students forward on key competencies they need to stay competitive.

Students must be a citizen of an African country. Dual citizens are eligible as long as students hold citizenship of an African nation. Residents of an African country who do not have citizenship belonging to an African country are ineligible at this time.

African students must return to work in Africa, within two years of graduation, for a period of at least two years. Students pursue a wide variety of careers after graduation. As an UC graduate, students are expected to devote the management and leadership skills learned at UC to developing the African economy. As such, UC expects graduates to work for African organizations with significant operations and impact in the region.

== Recognition ==
UC has been recognized by the Ministry of Education (in French: Ministère de l’Enseignement Supérieur et de la Recherche Scientifique) as an institute for higher education in 2010. UC has been recognized as a non-profit organisation (ASBL) by the Ministry of the Interior in 2009. By ministerial decree, UC is authorized for academic studies in the fields of Law (Faculté de Droit, 1/3/2010) and Management (Faculté de Gestion, 20/1/2010).

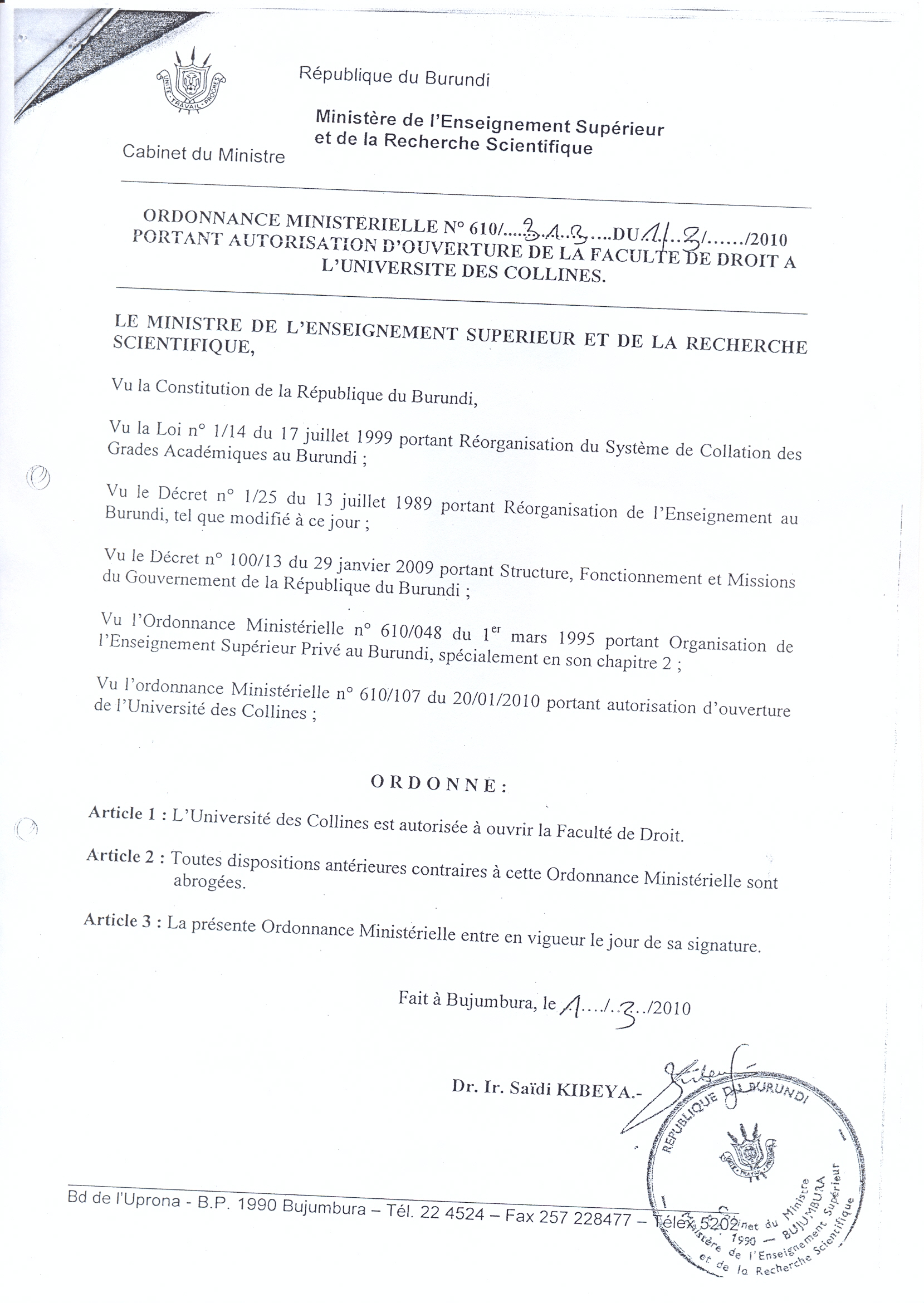
Recognition Faculty of Law

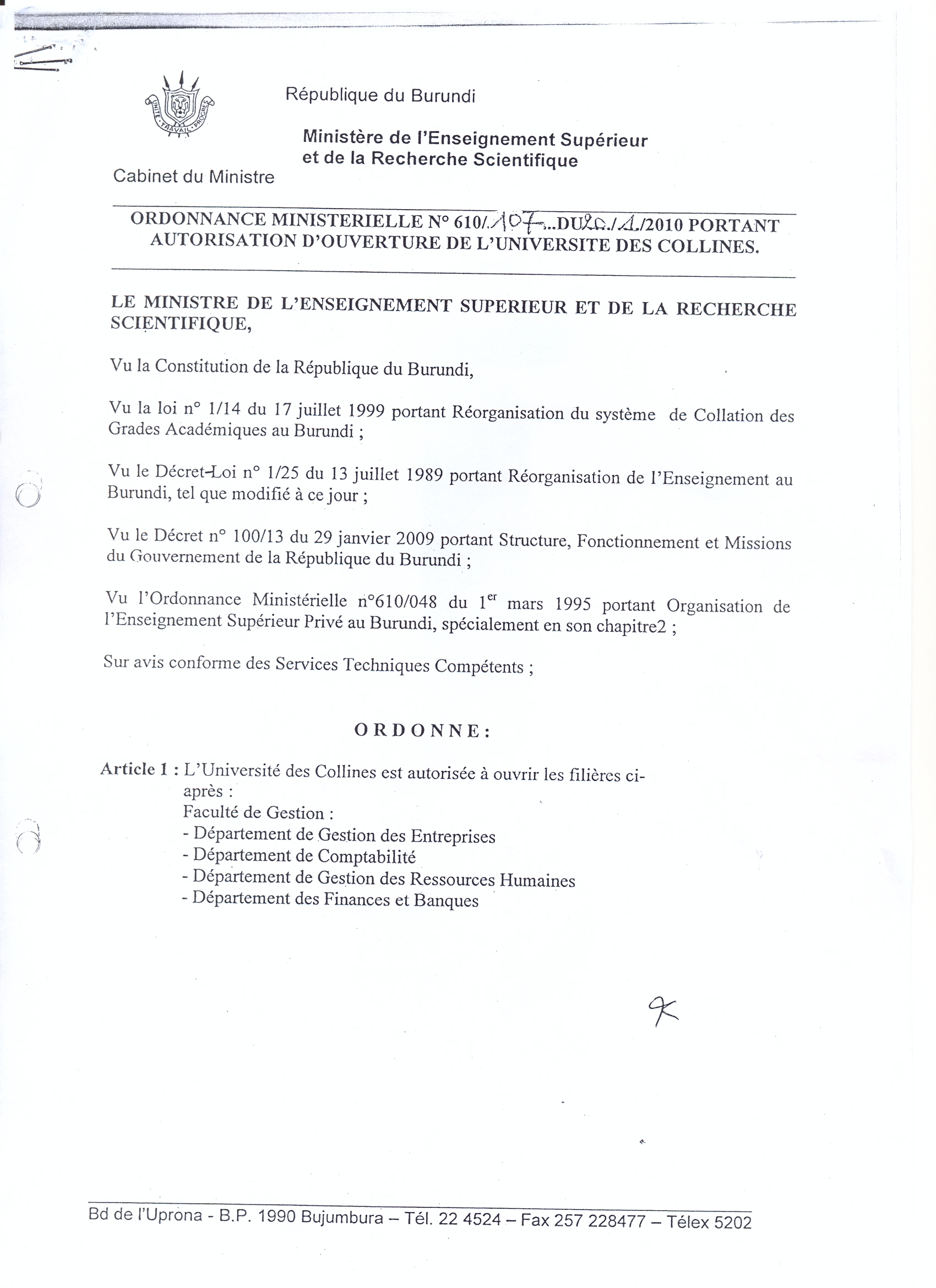
Recognition Faculty of Management

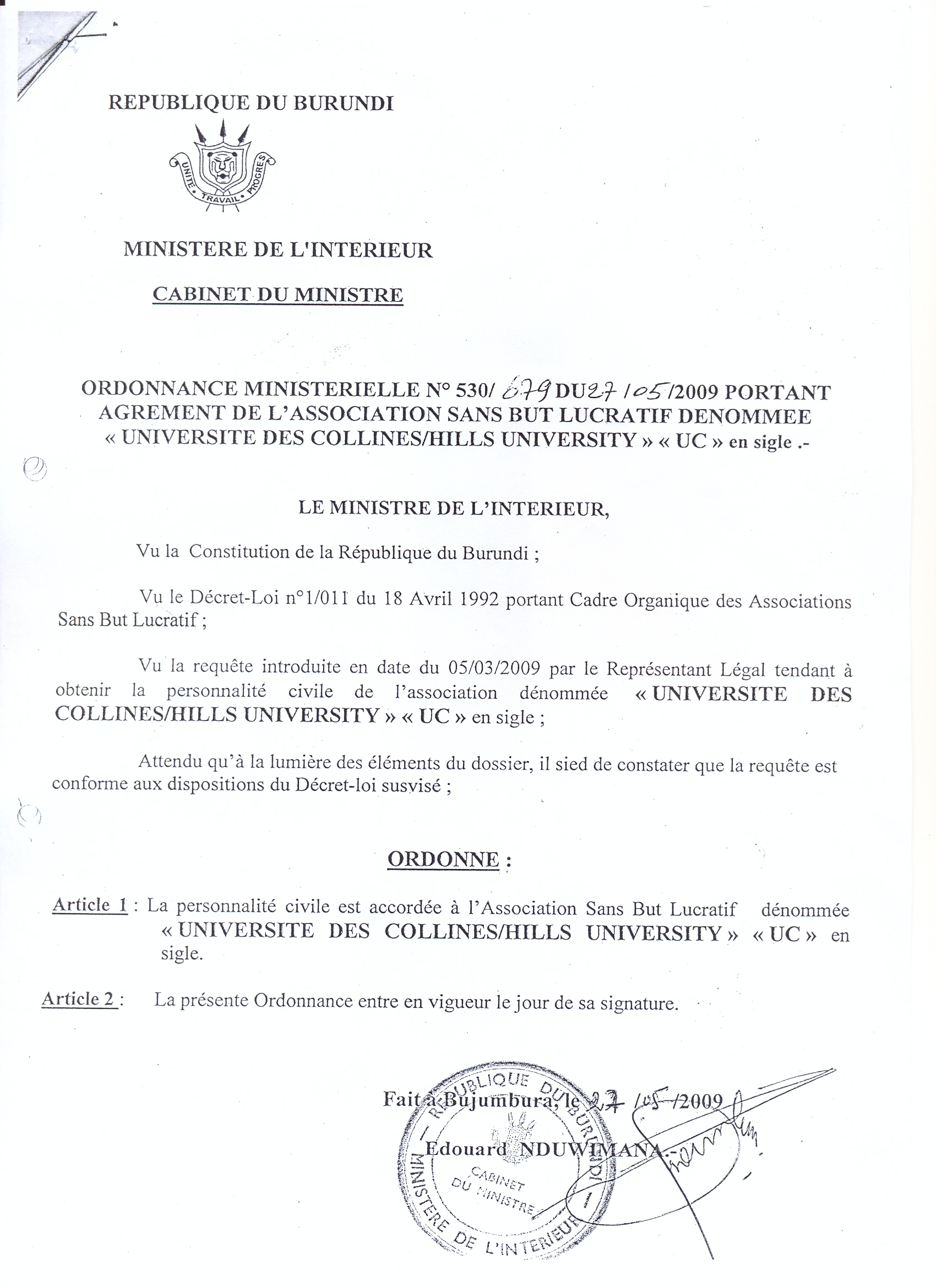
Recognition as non-profit organisation(1)

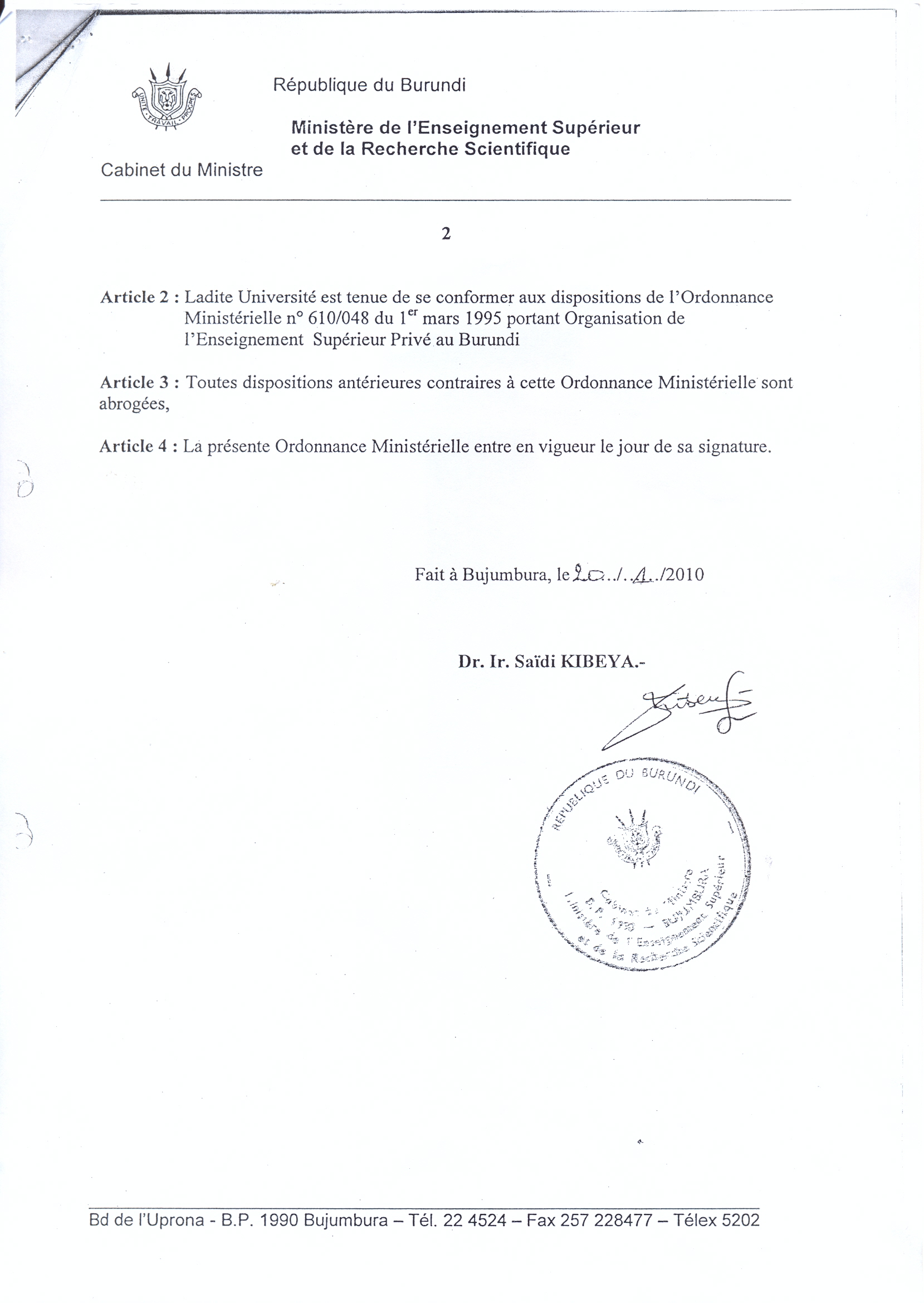
Recognition as non-profit organisation (2)

== Courses ==
At UC, students can register for open education courses and follow them in real time. Students are encouraged to use MOOCs (Massive Open Online Courses) and courses that offer all of their materials freely online under an intellectual property license, including video lectures, notes, and assignments.

UC has the following faculties:

- Accounting (Département de Comptabilité)
- Business Management (Département de Gestion des Entreprises)
- Finances and Banking (Département des Finances et Banques)
- Human Resource Management (Département de Gestion des Ressources Humaines)
- Faculty of Law
