= Busoni, Burundi =

Busoni
- Town
- Location in Burundi
- Coordinates: 2°31′34″S 30°13′2″E
- Country: Burundi
- Province: Kirundo
- Commune: Busoni
- Elevation: 1,392 m (4,567 ft)
- Time zone: UTC+2 (Central Africa Time)

Busoni is a town and seat of the Commune of Busoni, Kirundo Province in northern Burundi.

== History ==
Ricard Ngabonziza was appointed the new administrator of the Commune of Busoni in December 2023.

== Geography ==
Busoni lies along Route 314, 17.3 kilometres (10.7 mi) by road northeast of the provincial capital of Kirundo, and 14.8 kilometres (9.2 mi) southwest of Kabanga. Burara lies to the north of the town, and Bahizi just to the southeast.

== Notable landmarks ==
Busoni contains the administrative headquarters bureau building of the Commune of Busoni.
