= Mukenke =

- Village and colline
- Location within Burundi
- Coordinates: 2.5831216°S 30.3344506°E
- Country: Burundi
- Province: Kirundo Province
- Commune: Bwambarangwe Commune
- Time zone: UTC+2 (Central Africa Time)

Mukenke is a town and colline in Bwambarangwe Commune, Kirundo Province, Burundi.

== Location ==
Mukenke is the administrative center of the Bwambarangwe Commune. It is in the center of commune. The RP61 road, which runs northeast from the RN6 highway near the border crossing into Tanzania, turns east to Mukenke where it turns north to runs through Budahunga, Minyaga, Kabanga. The Köppen climate classification is: Aw: Tropical savanna, wet.

== Health facilities ==
The town has a health center and hospital, the Hôpital de Mukenke. Solar panels, with storage and an AC converter, supply power for lights, medical equipment and refrigeration. In 2013, the quality of service indicators for hygiene and financial management of the health center were scored at around 80%. It served a target population of 11,498 as of 2019.

== Events ==
On 4 September 2019 it was reported that two days earlier Fébronie Niyingabire, Administrator of Bwambarangwe Commune, had summoned three young girls to the Bwambarangwe Communal office, where she slapped them and beat them with a stick. One of the girls was hospitalized. Their offense seems to have been attending dance rehearsals for the opening ceremonies of the office of the CNL party, which they had supported since the period when they lived in the Rukore refugee camp in Tanzania.

== Sources ==
- Carte Sanitaire du Burundi (PDF), Burundi Ministry of Public Health, 2016
- CDS Mukenke, Ministere de la Sante Publique et de la Lutte Contre le Sida
- EDF — electrification of 25 health centres in the provinces of Kirundo, Muyinga, Cankuzo, Ruyigi and Rutana in Burundi, Mercell, 2012
- "Bwambarangwe, Kirundo Province, Burundi", Mindat
- Mbazumutima, Abbas (3 April 2020), "Burundi/Covid-19 : Bwambarangwe, deux hommes conduits en quarantaine tués en cours de route", Iwacu (in French)
- "Node: Bwambarangwe (3041548506)", OpenStreetMap
- Uwimana, Diane (4 September 2019), Three young girls beaten in Bwambarangwe, IWACU Engolish News
