= Cyperus latifolius =

Scientific classification
- Kingdom: Plantae
- Clade: Tracheophytes
- Clade: Angiosperms
- Clade: Monocots
- Clade: Commelinids
- Order: Poales
- Family: Cyperaceae
- Genus: Cyperus
- Species: C. latifolius

Binomial name
- Cyperus latifolius Poir., 1806

Species of sedge

Cyperus latifolius is a species of sedge. It is native to parts of tropical and southern Africa.

== See also ==
- List of Cyperus species
