= Kabanga, Burundi =

Kabanga
- Village
- Location within Burundi
- Coordinates: 2.5103763°S 30.3122463°E
- Country: Burundi
- Province: Kirundo Province
- Commune: Commune of Busoni

Kabanga is a village and a colline in the Commune of Busoni, Kirundo Province, Burundi.

== Location ==
Kabanga is on the RP 61 road from Busoni to the west, and is in the northeast of the Commune of Busoni. It is southeast of the south end of Lake Kanzigiri, situated 3.25 kilometres (2.02 mi) to the northeast of Kabanga, which drains north into Lake Rweru. It lies at the juncture of routes 63 and 314, 14.8 kilometres (9.2 mi) northeast of Busoni, and 10.9 kilometres (6.8 mi) south of Nyagisozi.

== Health center ==
There is a health center in Kabanga. It uses solar panels, with storage and an AC converter, to supply power for lights, medical equipment and refrigeration. It served a target population of 22,936 as of 2017. As of 2013, quality of service levels for hygiene, maternity care and financial management were high, at around 95%.

== Politics ==
Jean Baptiste Nzigamasabo, known by the nickname "Gihahe", a parliamentarian of the National Council for the Defense of Democracy – Forces for the Defense of Democracy (CNDD-FDD) and former rebel reportedly has much control in Kabanga. On January 24, 2010, violence broke out in Kabanga, when members of the CNDD-FDD's Imbonerakure youth wing fought with political opponents of the National Forces of Liberation (FNL), hurling rocks and beating people with sticks. The following day, FNL member, Jean de Dieu Ntakarutimana, was illegally arrested by the director of the local school. Minister of the Interior Edouard Nduwimana arrived in Katanga on January 28 and gave a peace talk.

In December 2011 Jean Claude Ngabonziza, who represented the party opposing the CNDD in Kirundo, was arrested in Kabanga. It was said that Jean Baptiste Nzigamasabo, the deputy elected in Busoni, had told his supporters to seize Ngabonziza, whom he described as a traitor for leaving the ruling party. Nzigamasabo had earlier led a mob of CNDD-FDD youth in Kirundo, who threw stones at FNL members and chanted "We will tie you up, we will shoot you." He was not charged for this incident. In February 2020 Martin Ndagijimana, head of the youth district of the CNL party, was arrested in Kabanga by Léonard Nkeraguhiga, chief of the colline, for daring to call the chief at a late hour without permission. He was the tenth CNL activist to be detained in Busoni in a two-week period.

== Economy ==
In May 2017 the Commune of Busoni issued a call for tender for construction of an administrative block at the Kabanga Trades Education Center, as well as other works in Mukerwa and Munazi. Funding for the works was allocated to the commune by the Government of Burundi. The Collective for the Promotion of Youth Associations (CPAJ) is active in the region, and provides small loans. In 2018 Zainabu Nkundibiza, a leader of the CPAJ in the commune of Busoni, noted that on the colline of Kabanga men are often supportative of women as financial managers, and as mediators in resolving disputes. In 2024 it was reported that a new water supply network had been installed where pumps fed water to a Murore reservoir, which was then transported to the center of Kabanga. On 4 May 2024 Kirundo Province authorities and members of the national police joined local people in the Kabanga colline to maintain the Nyarunazi-Kobero road. In September 2018, a new market was inaugurated in Kabanga, in celebration of the 56th anniversary of Burundi.

== Sources ==
- Avis d'Appel d'Offres Ouvert National (PDF), Commun de Busoni, 5 May 2017
- Burundi: Ensure Zero Tolerance for Election Violence, Human Rights Watch, 14 May 2010
- Burundi : Inauguration du marché moderne de Kabanga, KIRUNDO (in French), 14 September 2014
- Carte Sanitaire du Burundi (PDF), Burundi Ministry of Public Health, 2016
- CDS Kabanga (in French), Ministere de la Sante Publique et de la Lutte Contre le Sida
- EDF — electrification of 25 health centres in the provinces of Kirundo, Muyinga, Cankuzo, Ruyigi and Rutana in Burundi, Mercell.com
- "Entretien de la route Nyarunazi-Kobero à Busoni, Kirundo", AGnews, 7 May 2024
- Ndabashinze, Rénovat (19 March 2024), "Grâce à Rusumo, des vies sauvées à Busoni et Giteranyi", Iwacu
- "Node: Kabanga (3517578468)", OpenStreetMap
- Nzeyimana, Martine (29 December 2018), "À Busoni, des femmes autonomes impulsent le leadership", Jimbere Magazine
- "Un cadre de l'opposition arrêté au Nord du Burundi", arib.info, 10 December 2011
- "Un coup de fil à une autorité locale a valu la détention à un responsable du CNL à Busoni", SOS Média Burundi, 2020-02-24
- ""We'll Tie You Up and Shoot You"" (PDF). Human Rights Watch.
