= Bujumbura Light University =

- Université Lumière de Bujumbura
- Other names: ULBU
- Motto: Pepinière de futures cadres
- Type: Private university
- Established: 2000; 26 years ago
- Rector: Dr Deo Nimpagaritse
- Students: 1,800 (2014)
- Location: Bujumbura, Burundi; 3.374846°S 29.397296°E
- Website: www.ulbu.bi

Bujumbura Light University (French: Université Lumière de Bujumbura, or ULBU) is a private university located in Bujumbura, founded in 2000 by the Center for the Production and Distribution of Christian Literature (CEPRODILIC), a non-profit association in Burundi.

== Schools and campus ==
=== Faculties ===
- Faculty of Science and technology (Faculté de Science et technologie)
- Faculty of Theology (Faculté de Théologie)
- Faculty of Law (Faculté des Droits)
- Faculty of Business and Management (Faculté de Gestion et d'Administration)
- Faculty of Information technology (Faculté de Sciences Informatiques)
- Faculty of Science in communication and journalism (Faculté des Sciences de la Communication)

=== Campus ===
- Mutanga Nord Campus (main campus)
- Kinindo Campus
- Goma Campus (Democratic Republic of the Congo)

== See also ==
- University of Burundi
- Hope Africa University
