= Commune of Ruhororo =

Coordinates: 2°58′36″S 30°00′51″E

- Commune
- Interactive map of Commune of Ruhororo
- Country: Burundi
- Province: Ngozi Province
- Administrative center: Ruhororo
- Time zone: UTC+2 (Central Africa Time)

The commune of Ruhororo is a commune of Ngozi Province in northern Burundi. The capital lies at Ruhororo.
