= Commune of Busiga =

Coordinates: 2°52′00″S 29°41′26″E

- Commune
- Interactive map of Commune of Busiga
- Country: Burundi
- Province: Ngozi Province
- Administrative center: Busiga
- Time zone: UTC+2 (Central Africa Time)

The commune of Busiga is a commune of Ngozi Province in northern Burundi. The capital lies at Busiga.

== See also ==
Commune of Marangara
