= Sangwe cooperative =

Rural cooperatives in Burundi

Sangwe cooperatives are government-sponsored rural cooperatives in Burundi, launched in 2019. They receive interest-free loans to develop agriculture and livestock. There have been practical difficulties, including poor management, misconceived projects, theft and concerns that membership of the ruling party is required to gain benefits.

== Launch ==
The government of Burundi initiated a policy of "Sangwe" colline cooperatives in 2019. They were to be supervised by Anacoop (Agence Nationale de Promotion et de Régulation des Sociétés Coopératives) and funded by Fonic (Fonds National d'Investissement Communal: National Communal Investment Fund). An interest-free loan of 10 million BIF, about $5,000, is granted to each colline from the general state budget, which should be repaid in two years. The program was launched in the run-up to the 2020 national elections, and many thought it was a way for the ruling National Council for the Defense of Democracy – Forces for the Defense of Democracy (CNDD-FDD) party to gain support.

President Évariste Ndayishimiye, who took office in June 2020, created a more open and inclusive political environment and made development a priority. He said, "the war for peace is won, now we have to win the war against poverty... every mouth must have something to eat and every pocket must have money". 90% of the population live by agriculture and/or livestock. 63% of the population is under 25, and youth unemployment is more than 55%. The Sangwe cooperatives aimed to improve the economy and reduce unemployment, particularly among youth.

The government allocated 29.1 billion BIF for these loans in the 2019–2020 budget year, and 87.83 billion BIF for subsequent budget years. Over 2,900 cooperatives received state loans. Little was done to prepare the collines in terms of training them in cooperative management and business operations. Many of the members thought the money was a donation, and did not realize it had to be repaid.

== Results ==
Problems raised at a national media meeting in July 2020 included poor management, uncertain weather, shortage of veterinarians, shortage of animal medicines, and poor quality seeds. Repayment of a full loan within two years would be difficult. Two years later, problems included poor leadership and organization, misuse of the money, failure of projects and failure to repay the loans. Some claimed the cooperatives were controlled by the ruling party, they had to join the CNDD-FDD to receive benefits, and members even had to wear party badges to participate in meetings of their cooperative.

Ngozi Province has over 500 rural cooperatives, of which 298 had been funded by Fonic by February 2024. Most were having difficulty repaying their loans. One problem was that only a few members in each cooperative were active, make a fair share of benefits difficult. Another was cases where the management committees and colline chiefs were complicit in stealing livestock or produce. Management of resources was often poor, so productive equipment was underused. In February 2024 the governor of the province, Désiré Minani, recognised the problems and said he intended to revive the cooperatives so that by July that year they could repay their loans and start investing their own money.

== Sources ==
- "Les coopératives Sangwe sur l'agenda du cabinet du gouverneur", ABP: Agence Burundaise de Presse (in French), 8 February 2024
- Manirakiza, Fabrice; Ndabashinze, Rénovat (11 March 2024), "Coopératives Sangwe : Un projet louable mais politisé", Iwacu (in French)
- Manishatse, Lorraine Josiane (5 April 2022), "The (surprisingly political) cost of a goat in Burundi", African Arguments
- Niyongabo, Jean Marie Vianney (17 July 2020), "Les coopératives Sangwe : Une année après, les membres persévèrent pour gagner le pari", BurundiEco (in French)
