= Commune of Ngozi =

- Commune
- Location within Burundi
- Coordinates: 2°54′30″S 29°49′40″E
- Country: Burundi
- Province: Ngozi Province
- Administrative center: Ngozi

Area
  - Total: 184.46 km^{2} (71.22 sq mi)
- Elevation: 1,820 m (5,970 ft)

Population (2008 census)
  - Total: 120,557
  - Density: 653.57/km^{2} (1,692.7/sq mi)
- Time zone: UTC+2 (Central Africa Time)

The commune of Ngozi is a commune of Ngozi Province in northern Burundi. The capital lies at Ngozi.
