= Commune of Tangara =

Coordinates: 2°58′25″S 30°04′58″E

- Commune
- Interactive map of Commune of Tangara
- Country: Burundi
- Province: Ngozi Province
- Administrative center: Tangara
- Time zone: UTC+2 (Central Africa Time)

The commune of Tangara is a commune of Ngozi Province in northern Burundi. The capital lies at Tangara.

The Tangara Commune is known for quality coffee cultivation at elevations from 1,700-1,900 metres asl.
