= Commune of Gashoho =

Coordinates: 2°48′20″S 30°08′20″E

- Commune
- Interactive map of Commune of Gashoho
- Country: Burundi
- Province: Muyinga Province
- Administrative center: Gashoho
- Time zone: UTC+2 (Central Africa Time)

The commune of Gashoho is a commune of Muyinga Province in northeastern Burundi. The capital lies at Gashoho.
