= Ngozi, Burundi =

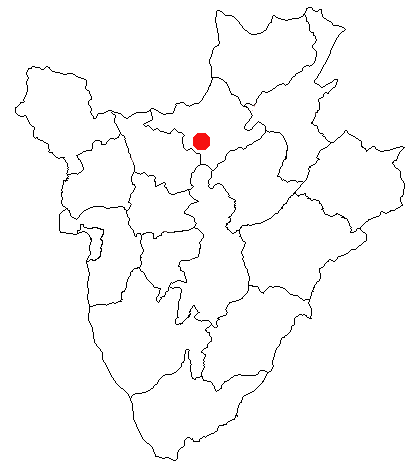
- Location of Ngozi on the map of Burundi

- Location in Burundi
- Coordinates: 02°54′30″S 29°49′37″E
- Country: Burundi
- Province: Ngozi Province
- Elevation: 1,806 m (5,925 ft)

Population (2008)
  - Total: 39,884

Ngozi is a town located in northern Burundi. It is the largest urban center in the Ngozi Province and the location of the provincial headquarters.

== Location ==
The town of Ngozi is located in Ngozi Commune, in Ngozi Province, in central northern Burundi. This is approximately 125 kilometres (78 mi) northeast of Bujumbura, the economic and financial capital of Burundi. Ngozi is located approximately 83 kilometres (52 mi) north of the city of Gitega, the national political capital.

The geographical coordinates of Ngozi Town are: 02°54'30.0"S, 29°49'37.0"E (Latitude: -2.908333; Longitude:29.826944). The town is nestled at an average elevation of 5,925 feet (1,806 m) above mean sea level.

== Climate ==
Climate data for Ngozi (1961–1990)
Month	Jan	Feb	Mar	Apr	May	Jun	Jul	Aug	Sep	Oct	Nov	Dec	Year
Mean daily maximum °C (°F)	21.9 (71.4)	22.1 (71.8)	22.0 (71.6)	21.4 (70.5)	20.8 (69.4)	21.0 (69.8)	21.6 (70.9)	22.8 (73.0)	23.5 (74.3)	22.7 (72.9)	21.5 (70.7)	21.4 (70.5)	21.9 (71.4)
Mean daily minimum °C (°F)	11.5 (52.7)	11.5 (52.7)	11.6 (52.9)	12.1 (53.8)	11.3 (52.3)	9.3 (48.7)	8.6 (47.5)	9.7 (49.5)	12.1 (53.8)	11.9 (53.4)	11.7 (53.1)	11.6 (52.9)	11.1 (51.9)
Average rainfall mm (inches)	166.8 (6.57)	176.7 (6.96)	203.1 (8.00)	204.8 (8.06)	117.3 (4.62)	10.2 (0.40)	5.1 (0.20)	15.8 (0.62)	65.8 (2.59)	127.0 (5.00)	185.6 (7.31)	175.7 (6.92)	1,453.9 (57.25)
Average rainy days (≥ 0.1 mm)	22	19	21	23	16	3	1	3	9	17	23	24	181
Source: World Meteorological Organization

== Population ==
The national population census of 16 August 1990 enumerated the population at 14,511. On 16 August 2008, the national census that year put the population of Ngozi, Burundi at 39,774 people.

Historical population
Year	Pop.	±%
1990	14,511	—
2008	39,884	+174.9%

== Economy ==
The residents in the town and surrounding communities are primarily subsistence agriculturalists who also keep domesticated animals, primarily cattle. Crops raised include maize, sweet potatoes, coffee, bananas, cassava, beans and tea. Light industrial activities include the processing of tea and mining of tin ore.

== Education ==
The campus of the University of Ngozi, a private university, was established in 1999.

== Banking ==
Ecobank, a commercial bank, maintains a branch in Ngozi, Burundi.

== Electricity ==
The Kigoma–Butare–Ngozi–Gitega High Voltage Power Line, which connects the electricity grids of Rwanda and Burundi, passes through the town of Ngozi.

== Notable residents ==
- Sandra Muhoza, journalist

== See also ==
- Commune of Ngozi
