= Rurubu River =

River in Africa

Ruvubu River Rurubu, Ruvuvu
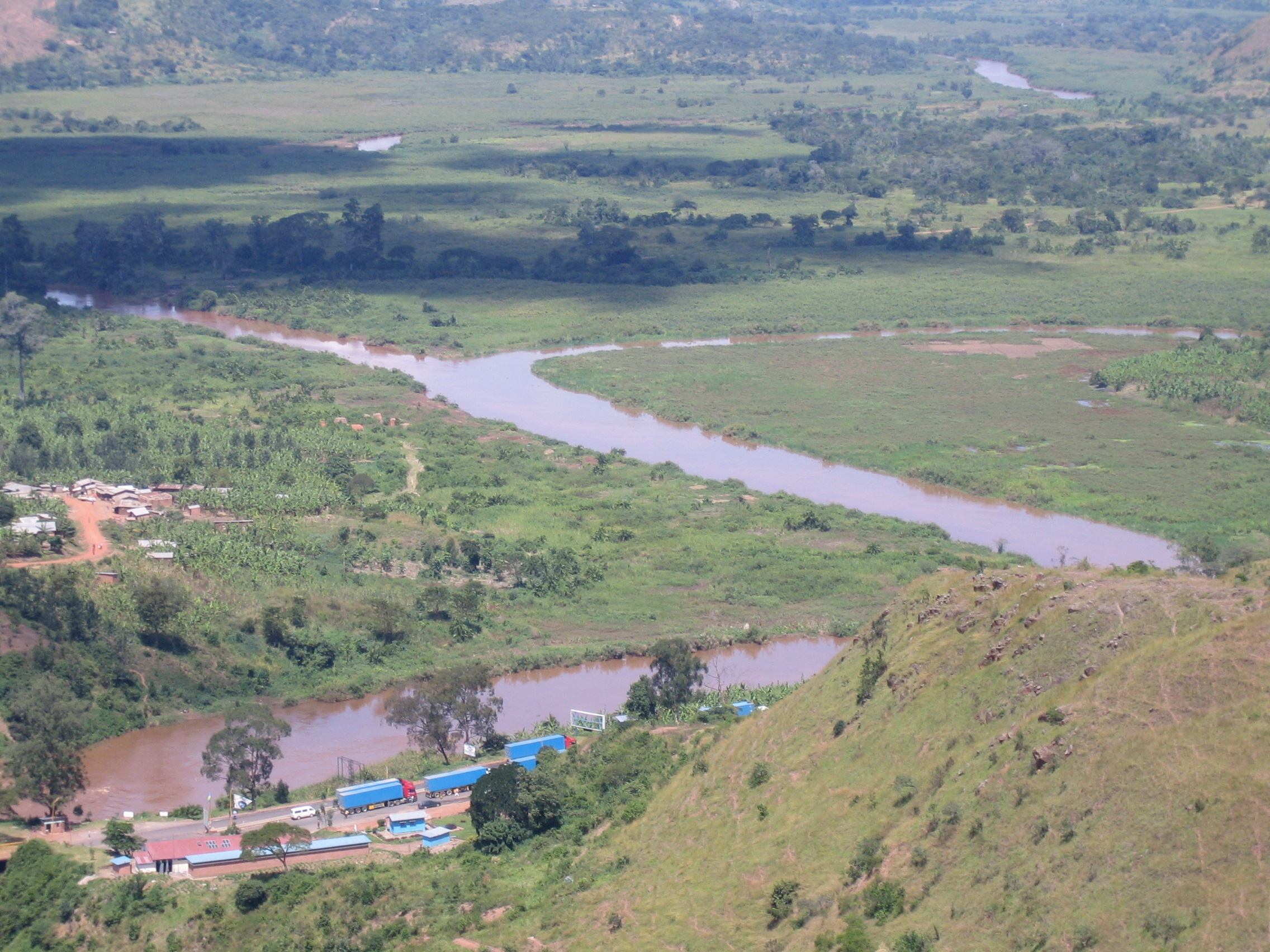
- The Ruvubu at its confluence with Kagera as seen from Rwanda. The Ruvubu comes from the left of the image.

Location
- Countries: Burundi, Tanzania

Physical characteristics
- Source: Nyagasumira River
  - location: Gitega, Burundi
  - coordinates: 3.684350°S 29.808489°E
  - elevation: 2,030 m (6,660 ft)
- Mouth: Kagera River
  - location: Kagera Region, Tanzania
  - coordinates: 2°23′23″S 30°46′52″E
  - elevation: 1,322 m (4,337 ft)
- Length: 313.8 km (195.0 mi)
- Basin size: 12,230 km^{2} (4,722 sq mi)
- Discharge
  - location: Mouth
  - average: 100.7 m^{3} (3,556 cu ft)
  - minimum: 23.80 m^{3} (840.5 cu ft)
  - maximum: 239.9 m^{3} (8,471 cu ft)

Basin features
- Progression: Kagerai → Lake Victoria → White Nile → Nile → Mediterranean Sea
- Population: 4,055,031 (2016)
- Tributaries
  - left: Kinyankuru, Ndurumu, Kavurugu, Cizanye
  - right: Mubarazi, Ruvyironza, Nyabaha, Kayongozi

The Ruvubu River (also spelt Rurubu and Ruvuvu) is a river in central Africa whose waters gather from the most distant, southern portion of the Nile basin. It has a total length of 416 kilometres (258 miles) and a drainage basin of 14,000 km^{2} (5,400 sq mi). It rises in the north of Burundi, near the town of Kayanza and then does a southward arc through Burundi, being joined by the Ruvyironza River near Gitega. From there it runs northeast, through the Ruvubu National Park, up to the Tanzanian border. After a stretch along the border, the Ruvubu crosses properly into Tanzania, before joining the Kagera River on the Tanzania–Rwanda border approximately 2 km (1.2 mi) upstream from Rusumo Falls.

The Ruvubu gets its name from the Kirundi word for hippopatamus, imvubu, because the river is home to a large population of hippos.

== Course ==
The Ruvubu River originates on the Congo-Nile ridge at Ngoga, at an altitude of 2,300 metres (7,500 ft). It flows from northwest to southeast to Mugera, and from there, takes a northeast direction. It flows for 285 kilometres (177 mi) through Burundi, and drains most of Burundi’s part of the Nile watershed. Its watershed covers 10,200 square kilometres (3,900 sq mi) and covers the center of Burundi.

Tributaries on both banks include the Kinyankuru River, Ndurumu River, Nyakigezi River, Nkoma River, Mubarazi River, Ruvyironza River, Nyabaha River and Kayongozi River. Most of these rivers have their source on the Congo Nile ridge. The Ruvubu passes through the Buyenzi, Kirimiro and Bweru natural regions. The Ruvubu marshes are largely flooded and occupied by permanent swamps.

== Sources ==
- Igirukwishaka, J.B.; Bararunyeretse, P.; Habonayo, R.; Bangirinama, F. (6 September 2023), "Contribution à la caractérisation des plantes envahissantes des marais de la rivière Ruvubu" (PDF), Bulletin Scientifique sur l'Environnement et la Biodiversité (in French), archived (PDF) from the original on 2024-07-15
- Projet de developpement local pour l'emploi (PDF) (in French), Bujumbura: Agence Burundaise pour la realisation des travaux d’interet public, November 2019
