= Commune of Gashikanwa =

Coordinates: 2°54′24″S 29°54′02″E

- Commune
- Interactive map of Commune of Gashikanwa
- Country: Burundi
- Province: Ngozi Province
- Administrative center: Gashikanwa
- Time zone: UTC+2 (Central Africa Time)

The commune of Gashikanwa is a commune of Ngozi Province in northern Burundi. The capital lies at Gashikanwa.
