= Ngozi Province =

Province of Burundi

Coordinates: 02°54′30″S 29°49′35.50″E

Ngozi
- Province
- Country: Burundi
- Capital: Ngozi

Area
  - Total: 1,473.86 km^{2} (569.06 sq mi)

Population (2008 census)
  - Total: 660,717
  - Density: 448.290/km^{2} (1,161.07/sq mi)

Ngozi was one of the provinces of Burundi. In 2025, it was merged into the new province of Butanyerera.

== Location ==
Ngozi Province was in the center of northern Burundi, and bordered Rwanda to the north. Kayanza Province was to the west, Gitega Province and Karuzi Province to the south, Muyinga Province to the east and Kirundo Province to the northeast. Most of Ngozi Province was in the Buyenzi natural region, apart from a region in the east that was in the Bweru natural region.

== Communes ==
It was divided administratively into the following communes:

- Commune of Busiga
- Commune of Gashikanwa
- Commune of Kiremba
- Commune of Marangara
- Commune of Mwumba
- Commune of Ngozi
- Commune of Nyamurenza
- Commune of Ruhororo
- Commune of Tangara

== Sources ==
- Atlas des quatre sites Ramsar: Localisation et Resources (PDF) (in French), Ministry of Water, Environment and Urbanism, October 2014
