= Mpanda Hospital =

Geography
- Location: Mpanda, Commune of Mpanda, Bubanza Province, Burundi
- Coordinates: 3.1703°S 29.4038°E

Organisation
- Care system: Public

Links
- Lists: Hospitals in Burundi

The Mpanda General Hospital (French: Hôpital Général de Mpanda) is a hospital in Bubanza Province, Burundi.

== Location ==
The Mpanda Hospital is a hospital in Mpanda, in the Mpanda Health District. The other hospital in the district is the Gihanga Hospital. It is a public regional hospital serving a population of 110,661 as of 2014.

== Events ==
The Chinese Government provided funds to build the Mpanda General Hospital, which was inaugurated in 2011. It was hoped to reduce the cost of treatment for patients who would otherwise have to travel abroad.

As of August 2015 services were slow and biomedical equipment such as the X-ray machine had been out of service for two years. The scanner had broken down five months before. Spare parts for these machines were extremely expensive. Other machines such as the electrocardiogram and the electroencephalogram required specialists to operate them. Doctors were expected from China, but they could not communicate with patients in Kirundo or French.

In November 2021 candidates and employees criticized a recent recruitment process at the hospital, claiming that some candidates failed the written text but were accepted based on their files, while others were rejected due to incomplete files. They asserted that the managers had also corrected the test papers of those they wanted to hire. They asked for a new process run by an independent group from the Ministry of Health.

Mpanda General Hospital was one of three helped by the 21st Chinese medical team from Qinghai province, which arrived in July 2022. The others were the Prince Regent Charles Hospital in Bujumbura and the Gitega Regional Hospital. The team of 29 people included specialists in obstetrics-gynecology, urology, ophthalmology, surgery, internal medicine, acupuncture, pediatrics, orthopedics, stomatology, radiology, ultrasound and otolaryngology. They also brought medicines, surgical instruments and materials to prevent spread of COVID-19.

As of February 2023 the Mpanda General Hospital had the only functional medical scanner in Burundi. Scanners are sensitive instruments, and often require maintenance after power cuts. All the scanners in the city of Bujumburu had broken down. Hospitals with non-functional scanners included Kira Hospital, Karusi Cinquantenaire Hospital and Tanganyika Care Polyclinic. Kamenge Military Hospital had plans to instal a scanner, but lacked the resources. All patients requiring scans were being referred to Mpanda.

== Sources ==
- Carte Sanitaire du Burundi (PDF), Burundi Ministry of Public Health, 2016
- Financement base sur la performance HR Mpanda (in French), Ministere de la Sante Publique et de la Lutte Contre le Sida
- "Le recrutement à l'hôpital Mpanda est décrié", Radio Publique Africaine (in French), 8 November 2021
- "L'Hôpital Général de Mpanda en difficultés", Isanganiro (in French), 27 August 2015
- Misago, Jeremie (1 February 2023), "Burundi : Un seul scanner est en service dans tout le pays", Iwacu (in French)
- "Quelque 1747 opérations ont été réalisées par une équipe médicale chinoise depuis juillet 2022", Agence Burundaise de Presse (in French), 19 January 2023
