= Musema Hospital =

Geography
- Location: Musema, Kayanza Province, Burundi
- Coordinates: 3.07638°S 29.67203°E

Organisation
- Care system: Public

Links
- Lists: Hospitals in Burundi

The Musema District Hospital (French: Hôpital de District de Musema) is a hospital in Kayanza Province, Burundi.

== Location ==
The Musema Hospital is in the north of Musema, just east of the RP51 highway.

The hospital is the district hospital for the Musema Health District, which serves the south of Kayanza Province. It is a public hospital serving a population of 207,064 as of 2014. The only other hospitals in the province are the Gahombo Hospital, serving the Gahombo Health District and the Kayanza Hospital serving the Kayanza Health District.

== Events ==
As of 2014, Musema Hospital had only three doctors. An ambulance was provided to the hospital in 2015. In 2015, the hospital was rated at 45% on administrative and logistic quality. This compared to 72% for the Bururi Hospital and 27% for the Bubanza Hospital.

In September 2022, the medical director of the hospital and two other employees were jailed on charges of embezzlement of hospital funds.

== Sources ==
- Bregmans Consulting & Research (August 2016), Rapport de contre verification des donnees quantitatives et qualitatives pour financement base sur la performance: second semestre 2015 (PDF) (in French), Ministere De La Sante Publique Et De La Lutte Contre Le Sida
- Carte Sanitaire du Burundi (PDF), Burundi Ministry of Public Health, 2016
- "Débarrassé des détourneurs des deniers publics, l'hôpital de Musema respire", Radio Inzamba (in French), 15 September 2022
- Etat des lieux de la gouvernance dans la province de Kayanza au cours de l’année 2014 (PDF) (in French), Observatoire de l’Action Gouvernementale, October 2014
- Financement base sur la performance HD Musema (in French), Ministere de la Sante Publique et de la Lutte Contre le Sida
- "Kayanza – 6.630 Cartes d'Assistance Médicale distribuées aux vulnérables en 2015", AGnews (in French), 27 January 2016
- "Way: Hôpital Musema (786248069)", OpenStreetMap
