= Mpanda (disambiguation) =

Mpanda may refer to the following places:

- Commune of Mpanda, Bubanza Province, Burundi
  - Mpanda, Gihanga
  - Mpanda, Mpanda
- Mpanda, Katavi Region, Tanzania
  - Mpanda District
  - Roman Catholic Diocese of Mpanda

== See also ==
- Mphande, a surname
