= Bururi Hospital =

Geography
- Location: Bururi, Bururi Province, Burundi
- Coordinates: 3.94903°S 29.62287°E

Organisation
- Care system: Public

Links
- Lists: Hospitals in Burundi

The Bururi Regional Hospital (French: Hôpital Régional de Bururi) is a hospital in Bururi Province, Burundi.

== Location ==
The hospital is the district hospital for the Bururi Health District, which serves the south of Bururi Province. It is a public regional hospital serving a population of 111,484 as of 2014.

As of 2016 the only other hospitals in the province were the Matana Hospital and the Rutovu Hospital, which both serve the Matana Health District. In June 2023 Evariste Ndayishimiye, President of Burundi. inaugurated the Kigutu Reference Hospital in Kiguti, Bururi. In November 2023 the faith-based Anders Gahore hospital was inaugurated by the Pentecostal Church of Kiremba in Bururi commune.

== Events ==
Bururi Hospital was among seven hospitals in Burundi who were found to detain patients who did not pay their bills in 2005. Some were released after benefactors paid their bills, while others found ways to escape.

In March 2024 the Bururi regional hospital began operating an oxygen production plant funded by the government of Canada in partnership with UNICEF. The plant at once proved its value in helping premature babies survive. Until then, the hospital had had to rely on oxygen transported from Bujumbura at considerable cost. Other hospitals that had received oxygen production plants under this program were Gitega Hospital, Ngozi Hospital and Cankuzo Hospital.

== Sources ==
- Carte Sanitaire du Burundi (PDF), Burundi Ministry of Public Health, 2016
- Detention in Public Hospitals for Lack of Payment, Human Rights Watch, 2006
- Financement base sur la performance HR Bururi (in French), Ministere de la Sante Publique et de la Lutte Contre le Sida
- "Inauguration de l'hôpital Anders Gahore de Kiremba", ABP: Agence Burundaise de Presse (in French), 30 November 2023
- Kwizera, Odette (17 June 2024), A l'Hôpital Régional de Bururi, l’usine de production d’oxygène sauve déjà des vies (in French), Unicef
- Le Président Ndayishimiye inaugure l’hôpital de référence de Kigutu (in French), Maison Ntare Rushatsi, 20 June 2023
