= Kigutu Hospital =

Kigutu Reference Hospital

Geography
- Location: Kiguti, Bururi Province, Burundi
- Coordinates: 4.05114°S 29.54222°E

Organisation
- Care system: Public

Links
- Website: https://www.villagehealthworks.org/hospital
- Lists: Hospitals in Burundi

The Kigutu Reference Hospital (French: Hôpital de Référence de Kigutu) is a hospital in Bururi Province, Burundi.

== Origins ==
Déogratias Niyizonkiza was born in Kigutu colline in Vyanda commune, Bururi province. He moved to the United States where he enrolled in Columbia University and then the Harvard School of Public Health. He returned to Burundi in 2006, and opened the Village Health Works (VHW) outpatient clinic in Kigutu in 2007. In 2014 the VHW opened a preschool, and the Ministry of Education gave it the mandate to administer the primary and secondary schools in Kigutu, with about 500 children. In 2015–2016 the community and the VHW built a hydroelectric power plant to power the campus.

As of 2016 the only hospitals in the province were the Bururi Hospital, Matana Hospital and Rutovu Hospital. In 2016 the Canadian government partnered with the VHW to expand the services provided by community health workers. In 2017 the Bill & Melinda Gates Foundation donated two million dollars to help start construction of the Kigutu Hospital and Women’s Health Pavilion. The Kigutu International Academy opened in 2020 and construction of the Learning Center and Teachers' House was completed in 2022.

The Kigutu Hospital and Women’s Health Pavilion was completed and opened on 20 June 2023. Evariste Ndayishimiye, President of Burundi, inaugurated the hospital and health pavilion. At the opening ceremony Melinda French Gates sent a video message, and Hillary Clinton of the Clinton Foundation sent a letter.

== Facilities ==
The new hospital has four general operating theaters, each capable of four operations per day, a maternity wing with private delivery rooms, neonatal and adult intensive care units, general pediatric & adult wards, and emergency ward and an observation/triage area. Services include pharmacy, laboratory, radiology (ultrasound and film x-rays), sterilization, rehabilitation, dietary/nutrition services, environmental services and infection control, and biomedical technology. The hospital receives referrals from the southern districts that previously were previously served by Bujumbura. The Kigutu Hospital Academy is attached to the hospital.

== Sources ==
- About, VHW
- A transformational step forward in the fulfillment of VHW’s longtime vision for dignified, accessible healthcare., VHW
- Carte Sanitaire du Burundi (PDF), Burundi Ministry of Public Health, 2016
- Le Président Ndayishimiye inaugure l’hôpital de référence de Kigutu (in French), Maison Ntare Rushatsi, 20 June 2023
- Nkurunziza, Dieudonné (20 June 2023), "Inauguration officielle de l'hôpital de référence de Kigutu", Radio Télévision Nationale du Burundi (in French)
