= Tanganyika Care Polyclinic =

Hospital in Bujumbura

Geography
- Location: Nyabugete & Kinanira, Bujumbura, Bujumbura Mairie Province, Burundi
- Coordinates: 3.40252°S 29.36862°E

Organisation
- Care system: Private

Links
- Website: tanganyikahospital.org
- Lists: Hospitals in Burundi

Tanganyika Care Polyclinic, recently renamed to Tanganyika Hospital, is a private hospital located in Bujumbura, Burundi.

== Location ==
The Tanganyika Care Polyclinic is in the Kinanira district, Musaga zone in Commune of Muha of Bujumbura Maire. It is to the west of the Chaussée de Gitega and south of the Avenue Gasibe.

It has also recently opened a new branch in Nyabugete.

== Services ==
The hospital describes itself as a modern hospital with state-of-the-art equipment at affordable prices. It provides a multidisciplinary team in the emergency room, for consultation, in surgery and in the hospital. It provides medical-surgical specialties and examinations such as laboratory tests, radiography/ultrasound, Siemens brand scanner, audiometry, optics and pharmacy. The hospital screens cancer patients, monitors development and provides chemotherapy if needed.

== Events ==
On 27 November 2021 Evariste Ndayishimiye, President of Burundi, attended various events in Bujumbura during the closing of the 15th edition of the Torch of Peace. These included the formal inauguration of the Tanganyika Care Polyclinic. The head of the Tanganyika Care Polyclinic offered the president a heifer in thanks.

As of February 2023 the Mpanda General Hospital had the only functional medical scanner in Burundi. Scanners are sensitive instruments, and often require maintenance after power cuts. All the scanners in the city of Bujumburu had broken down. Hospitals with non-functional scanners included Kira Hospital, Karusi Cinquantenaire Hospital and Tanganyika Care Polyclinic. All patients requiring scans were being referred to Mpanda.

In October 2023 the hospital organized a breast cancer screening campaign that was free for all women who wanted it, other than examinations of patients who were ill.

== Sources ==
- Bigirimana, Raphaël (28 November 2021), "Flambeau de la paix: le Chef de l'Etat inaugure différentes infrastructures", Radio Télévision Nationale du Burundi (in French)
- Misago, Jeremie (1 February 2023), "Burundi : Un seul scanner est en service dans tout le pays", Iwacu (in French)
- "Node: Tanganyika Care Polyclinic (10804372605)", OpenStreetMap
- Tanganyika Care Poyclinic (in French), Tanganyika Care Poyclinic
- "Une campagne de dépistage gratuit du cancer du sein est en cours à Tanganyika care polyclinic", TeleRenaissance (in French), 7 October 2023
