= CMCK =

CMCK may refer to:

- Centre Medico-Chirurgical de Kinindo
- Cultural & Museum Centre Karonga
