= Emmanuel Niyoyabikoze =

Burundian environmental activist

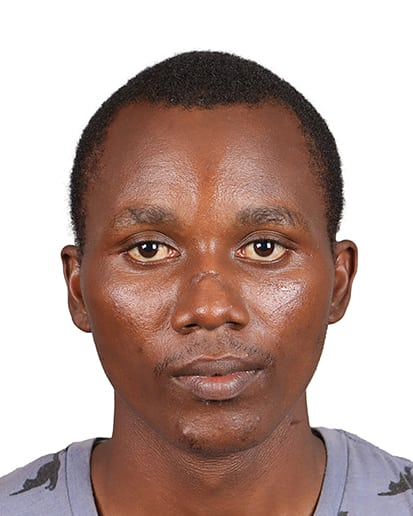
- Born: 20 December 1994 (age 31); Bubanza, Burundi
- Education: Institut National de Santé Publique
- Occupations: Midwife, nurse, environmental activist
- Organization: Founder of Greening Burundi

Emmanuel Niyoyabikoze (born 20 December 1994 in Bubanza, Burundi) is a Burundian midwife and environmental activist. He is the founder of the Greening Burundi organization, which works for reforestation, environmental protection and the promotion of sustainable development. Through this organization, he leads local actions focused on combating the effects of climate change, notably tree planting and promoting community awareness.

== Early life and education ==
Emmanuel Niyoyabikoze was born into a farming family in Bubanza, Burundi. His childhood was marked by the consequences of the Burundian Civil War (1993–2005), which profoundly affected infrastructure, leading in particular to deforestation and degradation of ecosystems.

From a young age, he developed an interest in environmental issues. According to some sources, he started planting trees at the age of eight to combat deforestation.

Niyoyabikoze obtained a bachelor's degree in midwifery sciences from the National Institute of Public Health of Burundi. He subsequently completed additional training in ecosystem management and forest conservation, including a course at Cornell University.

== Career ==
As a teenager, Niyoyabikoze observed the negative effects of deforestation on rural communities in his region. These observations prompted him to organize local awareness campaigns and collective tree planting initiatives.

Despite limited resources, he founded the Greening Burundi project, an initiative to promote reforestation and environmental sustainability. This project seeks to mitigate the effects of climate change through tree planting activities and educational programs. Some of Greening Burundi's initiatives have attracted international attention.

Niyoyabikoze has faced significant challenges, particularly due to the unstable political situation in Burundi. These led him to continue his environmental awareness activities abroad, particularly in Germany, where he continued to promote local and international initiatives to combat climate change.

Niyoyabikoze serves as lecturer at Baden Württemberg Cooperative State University. He is in charge of a Sustainability in the healthcare system and climate crisis in midwifery course, which prepares future professionals to understand the link between climate change and maternal health. He also works as a nurse and widwife at University Hospital Tübingen.

== Awards and recognition ==
- Global Peace Excellence Award, Maldives (2019)
- Mary Robinson Climate Justice Award (2021)
- East Africa Earth Champion (2021)
- "Named among the "Top 100 Young African Conservation Leaders" (2021)
- Named among the "5 influential personalities of Burundi" (2019)
- Nomination among the 25 "Burundian RoleModels" (2019)
