= Ninga =

Ninga could refer to:

- Ninga, Burundi, a village in Bubanza Province, Burundi
- Ninga, Njombe, a town in Njombe Region, Tanzania
- Casimir Ninga (born 1993), Chadian football player
- Kaō Ninga (fl. 14th century), Japanese painter
- Ninga, Manitoba, a community in the Municipality of Killarney-Turtle Mountain, Manitoba, Canada
- Ojibwe for one's mother

== See also ==
- Ninja, a type of warrior in medieval Japan
- Nigga, a racial slur
- Ninja (disambiguation)
- Nigger (disambiguation)
