= Kibuye =

Kibuye may refer to:

- Kibuye Hope Hospital - A rural hospital in Gitega Province, Burundi
- Kibuye, Rwanda - A city in Karongi District, Western Province, Rwanda
- Kibuye, Uganda - A neighborhood in the Makindye Division of the city of Kampala, Uganda's capital
- Kibuye (crater) - One of the craters on the planet Mars
- Kibuye Power Plant 1 - A small thermal power station (3.6 MW), located in Kibuye, Rwanda
- Kibuye Province - A defunct administrative area in Western Rwanda.
