= Nyunzwe =

- Location in Burundi
- Coordinates: 3°11′35″S 29°24′28″E
- Country: Burundi
- Province: Bubanza Province
- Commune: Commune of Mpanda
- Time zone: UTC+2 (Central Africa Time)

Nyunzwe is a village in the Commune of Mpanda in Bubanza Province in north western Burundi.
