= Gashoho Hospital =

Geography
- Location: Gashoho, Muyinga Province, Burundi
- Coordinates: 2.80812°S 30.132003°E

Organisation
- Care system: Public

Links
- Lists: Hospitals in Burundi

The Gashoho District Hospital (French: ️Hôpital de District Gashoho) is a hospital in Muyinga Province, Burundi.

== Location ==
As of 2016 the Gashoho Hospital was one of two hospitals in the Gashoho Health District, the other being the Giteranyi Hospital in the northeast. The hospital served a target population of 179,386 as of 2014.

== Sources ==
- Carte Sanitaire du Burundi (PDF), Burundi Ministry of Public Health, 2016
- Financement base sur la performance HD Gashoho (in French), Ministere de la Sante Publique et de la Lutte Contre le Sida
