= Ruyigi Hospital =

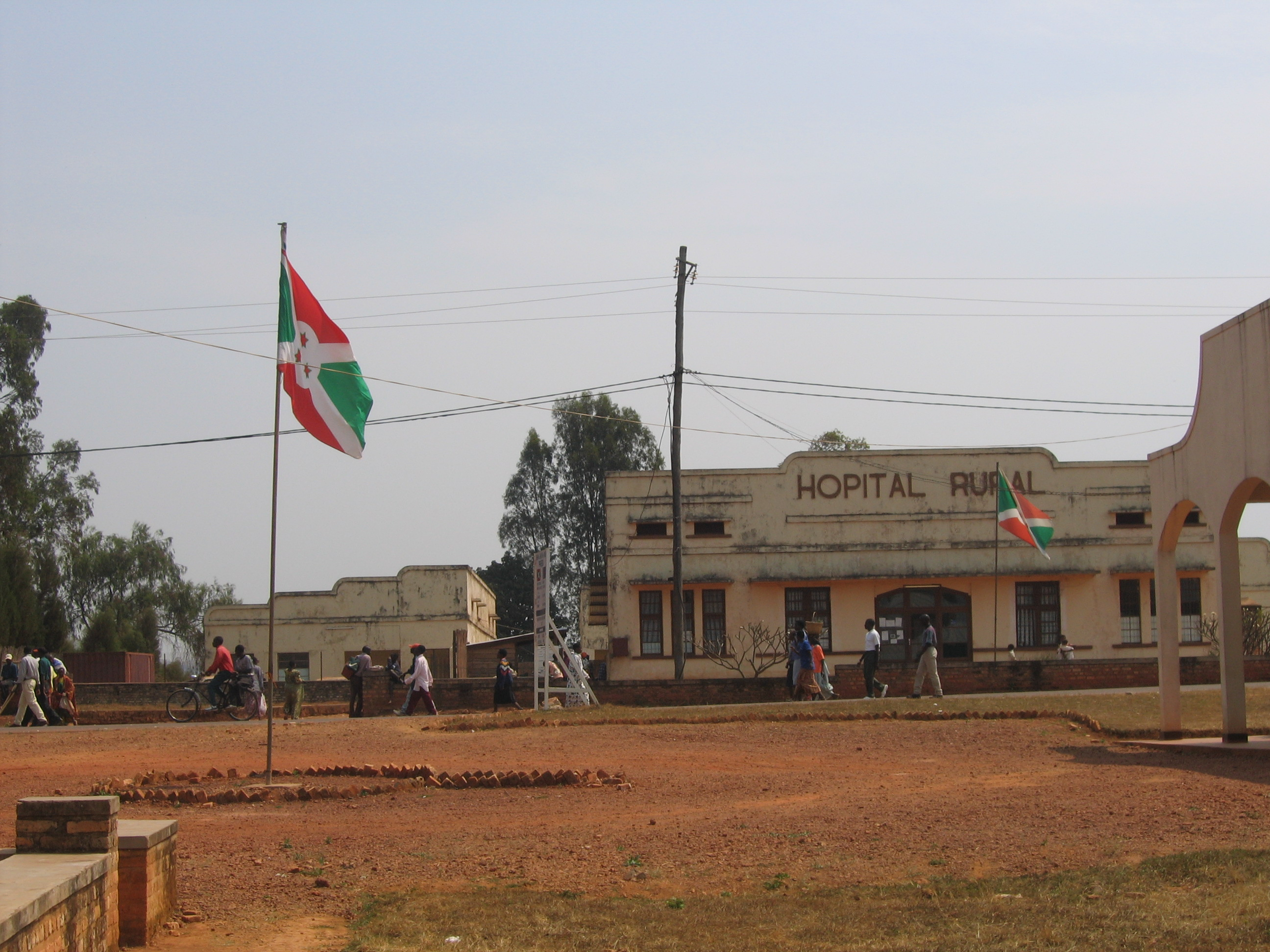

Geography
- Location: Ruyigi, Ruyigi Province, Burundi
- Coordinates: 3.47259°S 30.24805°E

Organisation
- Care system: Public

Links
- Lists: Hospitals in Burundi

The Ruyigi Rural Hospital (French: Hôpital Rural de Ruyigi) is a hospital in Ruyigi Province, Burundi.

== Location ==
Ruyigi Hospital is in the town of Ruyigi on the west side of the RP217 Route Burundi, to the north of the roundabout where the RP217 joins the RN13 highway. It is in the Ruyigi Health District, one of three in that district, the others being the Rema Hospital and the Cimpaye Hospital. It is a public district hospital serving a population of 45,598 as of 2014.

== History ==
The rural hospital was built in the Belgian colonial era, in colonial modernist style. It is now integrated into Burundi's health care system, serving a rapidly growing population.

A report in July 2017 said the hospital was badly lacking equipment and specialized doctors. The X-ray service was not available because the electricity generator did not have enough fuel. Patients with complex conditions had to be transferred to other hospitals such as Kibuye Hospital or Bugendana Clinic, both in Gitega Province.

== Sources ==
- Carte Sanitaire du Burundi (PDF), Burundi Ministry of Public Health, 2016
- Financement base sur la performance HD Ruyigi (in French), Ministere de la Sante Publique et de la Lutte Contre le Sida
- "L'hôpital de Ruyigi manque cruellement de matériels et de médecins spécialisés", Radio Publique Africaine (in French), 17 July 2017
- "Node: Hôpital rural de Ruyigi (2485034627)", OpenStreetMap
- "Ruyigi, Burundi. A hospital left behind from the Belgian colonial era", mediastorehouse
