= Bugendana Clinic =

Geography
- Location: Bugendana, Gitega Province, Burundi
- Coordinates: 3.232°S 29.912°E

Organisation
- Care system: Public

Links
- Lists: Hospitals in Burundi

The Bugendana Clinic (French: Clinique Saint Willibald et Walbourga de Bugendana) is a clinic and hospital in Gitega Province, Burundi.

== Location ==
It is in the Mutaho Health District. Other hospitals in the district are the public Mutaho Hospital and the faith-based Mutoyi Hospital. It is a recognized district hospital. The clinic specializes in treating cervical cancer patients, and has a capacity of 50 beds.

== History ==
The Bugendana Clinic was built by the Organization for the Development of the Archdiocese of Gitega (ODAG-Caritas) with the support of a German Diocese. The clinic was formally opened on 12 June 2017 by Pierre Nkurunziza, President of Burundi. The Bishop of Gitega, Bishop Simon Ntamwana, blessed the hospital in a ceremony attended by the Minister of Health, Thaddée Ndikumana.

A report in July 2017 said the Ruyigi Hospital was badly lacking equipment and specialized doctors. Patients with complex conditions had to be transferred to other hospitals such as Kibuye Hospital or Bugendana Clinic.

== Sources ==
- Carte Sanitaire du Burundi (PDF), Burundi Ministry of Public Health, 2016
- Financement base sur la performance HD Clinique Saint Willibald et Walbourga de Bugendana (in French), Ministere de la Sante Publique et de la Lutte Contre le Sida
- Ibitaro Bishasha I Bugendana: Ikindi Camwa C'ubucuti Bw'amadiyoseze Ya Gitega Na Eichstaett (in Rundi), Catholic Church of Burundi, 17 February 2019
- "L'hôpital de Ruyigi manque cruellement de matériels et de médecins spécialisés", Radio Publique Africaine (in French), 17 July 2017
- Ndaribaze, Jean Marie (2 November 2019), "Bugendana: A sigh of relief for cervical cancer patients", Radio Télévision Nationale du Burundi (in French)
