= Eliane Becks Nininahazwe =

Burundian singer and musician

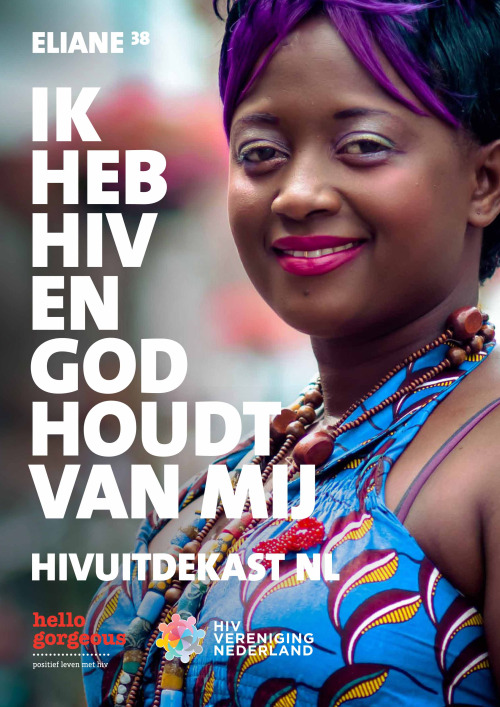
- The Dutch World AIDS Day poster featuring Nininahazwe
- Born: Murira, Commune of Gihanga, Burundi

Eliane Becks Nininahazwe is a Burundian singer and musician, who is also known for promoting AIDS/HIV awareness both in Burundi, and in the Netherlands, where she now lives.

== Career ==
Eliane Becks Nininahazwe was born and raised in Murira, Commune of Gihanga, Burundi. She was brought up during the fighting between the Hutu and Tutsi tribes, which resulted in the death of her sister during childbirth as they failed to get her to a hospital. She was diagnosed with Type 1 diabetes, and suffered from hyperglycaemia. Nininahazwe managed to control her blood sugar levels through regular check ups. Later on, she fell pregnant and her boyfriend left her, but she decided to keep the child.

Four months after giving birth, she met Dutchman Michel Becks, with whom she moved to Angola for his work. During a routine check for diabetes at the hospital she attended, she was diagnosed with HIV. After a bad experience at that hospital, she sought medical treatment in South Africa. Because of the stigma against HIV in Africa, the couple hid her medication whenever they travelled across borders in that continent. They then moved to The Netherlands, where she founded her company Indonongo, named after the one stringed instrument made from a cow's horn which she played. Due to the rarity of the instrument in the Netherlands, she brings back parts and equipment whenever she returns to Burundi.

Ever since her diagnosis, she has become an AIDS/HIV activist, promoting knowledge regarding the issues around the disease and fighting against the stigma which is still quite prevalent in Africa. Nininahazwe continues to openly promote AIDS awareness, being one of roughly two hundred people promoting World AIDS Day in 2015 on the official website. As a part of the celebrations in the following year, she sang at an event in The Netherlands promoting AIDS awareness and celebrating the work of The Netherlands drama No Socks No Shoes. In 2016, she was named one of the winners of that year's Voice Achievers Awards, winning the African Inspiration Award.

== Personal life ==
She is married with children, and now lives in Amersfoort, Netherlands.
