= Gihanga Hospital =

- Location within Burundi

Geography
- Location: Gihanga, Commune of Gihanga, Bubanza Province, Burundi
- Coordinates: 3.19047°S 29.30543°E

Organisation
- Care system: Public

Links
- Lists: Hospitals in Burundi

The Saint Augustine District Hospital of Gihanga (French: Hôpital de District Saint Augustin de Gihanga) is a faith-based hospital in Bubanza Province, Burundi.

== Location ==
The Gihanga Hospital is a hospital in the Commune of Gihanga, in the Mpanda Health District. The other hospital in the district is the Mpanda Hospital. It is an approved district hospital serving a population of 110,661 as of 2014. It is operated by the Bene-Mukama nuns.

== Events ==
In October 2013 Iwacu reported that due to lack of fuel the ambulance had rarely been used for over four months. Patients had to pay the driver to use it.

In March 2016 Saint Augustin hospital in Gihanga had been without electricity for abour a month. Surgical operations, laboratory tests and X-rays could not be provided. REGIDESO had dismantled a transformer close to the hospital, and said it was being repaired.

In September 2021 COVID-19 patients were sharing rooms with other patients due to lack of space. The few oxygen cylinders that were available were being shared by all patients. Over ten employees of the hospital had already been infected by the coronovirus.

In June 2022 the Bubanza health province was planning to add new Neonatology and the mother-child services in Gihanga Hospital, and also to teach health care staff how to explain the natural method of contraception to women.

== Sources ==
- "A l'hôpital Saint Augustin de Gihanga, la négligeance de Covid-19 est totale.", Radio Publique Africaine (in French), 24 September 2021
- Bigirimana, Christian (9 October 2013), "Gihanga : l'ambulance clouée au sol par manque de carburant, depuis quatre mois", Iwacu (in French)
- Carte Sanitaire du Burundi (PDF), Burundi Ministry of Public Health, 2016
- Financement base sur la performance HD Gihanga (in French), Ministere de la Sante Publique et de la Lutte Contre le Sida
- "Hôpital Gihanga: activités presque paralysées suite au manque d'électricité", Isanganiro (in French), 20 March 2016
- "La diminution sensible du paludisme, l'un des objectifs majeurs de la province sanitaire de Bubanza", Agence Burundaise de Presse (in French), 22 June 2022
- "Le choléra se fait parler de lui à Gihanga", Radio Publique Africaine (in French), 25 September 2019
