= Kirundo Hospital =

- Location within Burundi

Geography
- Location: Kirundo, Kirundo Province, Burundi
- Coordinates: 2.59051°S 30.08735°E

Organisation
- Care system: Public

Links
- Lists: Hospitals in Burundi

The Kirundo Hospital (French: Hôpital de Kirundo) is a hospital in Kirundo Province, Burundi.

== Location ==
Kirundo Hospital is a hospital in the city of Kirundo, in the south of the Kirundo Health District. It is the only hospital in the district. It is one of two hospitals serving the four health districts of Kirundo Province, the other being Mukenke Hospital. It is a public district hospital serving a population of 41,682 as of 2014.

== Events ==
A maternity ward was built on the hospital grounds between September 2007 and June 2008, funded by SOS Enfants. It gave the hospital greater capacity to serve women who chose to give birth in a hospital environment.

In January 2008 the Government of Burundi and the Kingdom of Belgium agreed to create the Kirundo Health Province Development Support Project. The project began in October 2008. Plans for Kirundo Hospital included construction of 3 blocks of external latrines (2 pits), construction of an emergency block, construction of a patient isolation block (4 rooms with 3 beds, care & services area), transformation of the operating room and construction of a miscellaneous material warehouse.

A physiotherapy department was created in the Kirundo Hospital in 2018.

In 2019 the hospital only had one ambulance, which was not enough to transport patients from remote areas who could not afford to pay for transport. At the end of December 2021 the Kirundo Hospital was flooded by malaria patients, and in some cases two or three patients had to share one bed. A nurse said that it was normal to have a malaria epidemic at that time of year. At least three people were dying at the hospital each week, most of them children. A lot of people died every day in local health centers, unable to afford transport to the hospital.

In October 2022 it was reported that only two doctors were consulting new patients. Seven general practitioners had left the hospital in less than a month. The reasons were said to be poor financial management by the director of the hospital and lack of incentives. The hospital received fees from patients, but the doctors did not get bonuses for their work.

In January 2023 Sylvie Nzeyimana, Minister of Public Health and the Fight against AIDS, met with public health sector staff in Kirundo Province to discuss challenges. She said she was aware of the lack of doctors at Kirundo Hospital and said they would soon recruit doctors to fill the gap.

== Sources ==
- Carte Sanitaire du Burundi (PDF), Burundi Ministry of Public Health, 2016
- Création d'un réseau de centres de réadaptation physique dans les hôpitaux du Burundi (in French), Association pour la Promotion de l'Education et de la Formation à l'Etranger
- Financement base sur la performance HD Kirundo (in French), Ministere de la Sante Publique et de la Lutte Contre le Sida
- "Inquiétudes sur l'insuffisance d'hôpitaux publics dans la province de Kirundo", Isanganiro (in French), 10 September 2019
- Kuriyo, Benjamin (22 January 2021), "Kirundo : 70% de la population n'ont pas accès à l'eau potable", Burundi Eco (in French)
- "La mauvaise gestion financière fait fuir les médecins à l'hôpital de Kirundo", Radio Publique Africaine (in French), 13 October 2022
- "Le ministre en charge de la santé publique face aux conflits dans quelques formations sanitaires", Agence Burundaise de Presse, 4 January 2023
- Maternité de Kirundo au Burundi (in French), SOS Enfants
- Rapport Annuel Appui a la Province Sanitaire de Kirundo (PDF) (in French), Coopération Technique Belge
- "Une épidémie non déclarée de paludisme en province Kirundo", Forum pour le Renforcement de la Société Civile Burundi (in French), 5 January 2022
