= Karuzi =

- Location in Burundi
- Coordinates: 3°06′S 30°10′E
- Country: Burundi
- Province: Karuzi Province

Population (2008)
  - Total: 10,317

Karuzi, or Karusi, is a city located in eastern Burundi. It is the capital city of Karuzi Province.

On 8 June 2020, Burundian president Pierre Nkurunziza died in Karuzi from cardiac arrest.

The Natwe Turashoboye Hospital is in the city of Karusi, in the south of the Buhiga Health District. It is a tertiary public hospital serving a population of 251,592 as of 2014.

== Sources ==
- Carte Sanitaire du Burundi (PDF), Burundi Ministry of Public Health, 2016
- Financement base sur la performance HT Natwe Turashoboye (in French), Ministere de la Sante Publique et de la Lutte Contre le Sida
