= Cibitoke Hospital =

Geography
- Location: Cibitoke, Cibitoke Province, Burundi
- Coordinates: 2.881°S 29.12497°E

Organisation
- Care system: Public

Links
- Lists: Hospitals in Burundi

The Cibitoke Hospital (French: Hôpital de Cibitoke) is a hospital in Cibitoke Province, Burundi.

== Location ==
Cibitoke Hospital is a hospital in the city of Cibitoke, in the center of the Cibitoke Health District. It is the only hospital in the district. It is a public district hospital serving a population of 242,469 as of 2014.

== Events ==
In May 2017 the Comitato Collaborazione Medica of Italy donated a neonatology room to the hospital.

== Sources ==
- Bahati, Jackson (29 May 2017), "L'hôpital de Cibitoke se dote d'une salle néonatologie", Iwacu (in French)
- Carte Sanitaire du Burundi (PDF), Burundi Ministry of Public Health, 2016
- Financement base sur la performance HD Cibitoke (in French), Ministere de la Sante Publique et de la Lutte Contre le Sida
