= List of hospitals in Burundi =

A list of hospitals in Burundi follows. These include public and private hospitals in Burundi.

Each province is typically divided into two or more health districts, each named for the main hospital, although some districts have no hospital and some have more than one.

The hospitals are:

Province	Health District	Hospital	Coords
Bujumbura (in former Bubanza)	Bubanza	Bubanza Hospital	3.08445°S 29.39544°E
Bujumbura (in former Bubanza)	Mpanda	Gihanga Hospital	3.19047°S 29.30543°E
Bujumbura (in former Bubanza)	Mpanda	Mpanda Hospital	3.1703°S 29.4038°E
Bujumbura (in former Bujumbura Mairie)	Zone Sud	CMCK – Centre Medico-Chirurgical de Kinindo	3.41736°S 29.35732°E
Bujumbura (in former Bujumbura Mairie)]	Zone Sud	BUMEREC – Burundi Medical and Research Center	3.39298°S 29.35102°E
Bujumbura (in former Bujumbura Mairie)	Zone Sud	Kira Hospital	3.3995°S 29.3593°E
Bujumbura (in former Bujumbura Mairie)	Zone Sud	Tanganyika Care Polyclinic	3.40252°S 29.36862°E
Bujumbura (in former Bujumbura Mairie)	Zone Centre	Prince Regent Charles Hospital	3.373°S 29.362°E
Bujumbura (in former Bujumbura Mairie)	Zone Centre	Prince Regent Charles Hospital	
Bujumbura (in former Bujumbura Mairie)	Zone Centre	Centre du Cœur Polyclinique	3.38954°S 29.36071°E,
Bujumbura (in former Bujumbura Mairie)	Zone Centre	Polyceb – Polyclinique Centrale de Bujumbura	3.38040°S 29.36881°E
Bujumbura (in former Bujumbura Mairie)	Zone Nord	CHUK – Kamenge University Hospital	3.35684°S 29.38527°E
Bujumbura (in former Bujumbura Mairie)	Zone Nord	Kamenge Military Hospital	3.3697°S 29.3872°E
Bujumbura (in former Bujumbura Rural)	Kabezi	Kabezi Hospital	3.53376°S 29.34236°E
Bujumbura (in former Bujumbura Rural)	Rwibaga	Rwibaga Hospital	3.4714°S 29.53880°E
Bujumbura Province (in former Bujumbura Rural)	Rwibaga	Ijenda Hospital	3.48048°S 29.56752°E
Bujumbura Province (in former Bujumbura Rural)	Isale	Rushubi Hospital	3.34559°S 29.48366°E
Burunga (in former Bururi)	Bururi	Bururi Hospital	3.94903°S 29.62287°E
Burunga (in former Bururi)	Bururi	Kigutu Hospital	4.05114°S 29.54222°E
Burunga (in former Bururi)	Matana	Matana Hospital	3.76205°S 29.69202°E
Burunga (in former Bururi)	Matana	Rutovu Hospital	3.8811°S 29.84491°E
Buhumuza (in former Cankuzo)	Murore	Murore Hospital	3.18752°S 30.664°E
Buhumuza (in former Cankuzo)	Cankuzo	Cankuzo Hospital	3.21985°S 30.55277°E
Bujumbura (in former Cibitoke)	Cibitoke	Cibitoke Hospital	2.881°S 29.12497°E
Bujumbura (in former Cibitoke)	Mabayi	Mabayi Hospital	2.71215°S 29.24422°E
Gitega	Mutaho	Bugendana Clinic	3.232°S 29.912°E
Gitega	Mutaho	Mutaho Hospital	3.15419°S 29.86264°E
Gitega	Mutaho	Mutoyi Hospital	3.21899°S 29.97684°E
Gitega	Kibuye	Kibuye Hope Hospital	3.6643°S 29.97963°E
Gitega	Gitega	Gitega Regional Hospital	3.42141°S 29.93398°E
Gitega	Gitega	Kibimba Hospital	3.2958256°S 29.79917°E
Gitega	Gitega	Umugiraneza Polyclinic	3.29483°S 29.80473°E
Gitega (in former Karusi)	Buhiga	Buhiga Hospital	3.03347°S 30.15834°E
Gitega Province (in former Karusi)	Buhiga	Natwe Turashoboye Hospital	3.104°S 30.1572°E
Butanyerera ( in former Kayanza)	Musema	Musema Hospital	3.07638°S 29.67203°E
Butanyerera ( in former Kayanza)	Kayanza	Kayanza Hospital	2.93116°S 29.63113°E
Butanyerera ( in former Kayanza)	Kayanza	Gahombo Hospital	2.97015°S 29.73262°E
Butanyerera ( in former Kirundo)	Mukenke	Mukenke Hospital	2.58426°S 30.333°E
Butanyerera ( in former Kirundo)	Kirundo	Kirundo Hospital	2.59051°S 30.08735°E
Burunga (in former Makamba)	Nyanza-Lac	Nyanza-Lac Hospital	4.34541°S 29.60019°E
Burunga (in former Makamba)	Makamba	Makamba Hospital	4.13679°S 29.81267°E
Gitega (in former Muramvya)	Kiganda	Kiganda Hospital	3.3476°S 29.6847°E
Gitega (in former Muramvya)	Muramvya	Muramvya Hospital	3.2677°S 29.62791°E
Buhumuza (in former Muyinga)	Giteranyi	Giteranyi Hospital	2.51728°S 30.458614°E
Buhumuza (in former Muyinga)	Gashoho	Gashoho Hospital	2.80812°S 30.132003°E
Buhumuza (in former Muyinga)	Muyinga	Muyinga Hospital	2.84244°S 30.34470°E
Gitega (in former Mwaro)	Fota	Fota Hospital	3.43987°S 29.70352°E
Gitega (in former Mwaro)	Kibumbu	Kibumbu Hospital	3.53083°S 29.74520°E
Gitega (in former Mwaro)	Kibumbu	Kibumbu Sanatorium	3.53357°S 29.73913°E
Butanyerera ( in former Ngozi)	Kiremba	Kiremba Hospital	2.8224°S 29.982127°E
Butanyerera ( in former Ngozi)	Buye	Buye Hospital	2.8627°S 29.81936°E
Butanyerera ( in former Ngozi)	Ngozi	Mivo Hospital	2.9486°S 29.79108°E
Butanyerera ( in former Ngozi)	Ngozi	Ngozi Hospital	2.9077°S 29.8225°E
Burunga (in former Rumonge)	Rumonge	Rumonge Hospital	3.97554°S 29.43945°E
Burunga (in former Rutana)	Gihofi	Gihofi Hospital	4.0324°S 30.14036°E
Burunga (in former Rutana)	Rutana	Rutana Hospital	3.929°S 29.993°E
Buhumuza (in former Ruyigi)	Ruyigi	Ruyigi Hospital	3.47259°S 30.24805°E
Buhumuza (in former Ruyigi)	Ruyigi	Rema Hospital	3.46979°S 30.25887°E
Buhumuza (in former Ruyigi)	Ruyigi	Cimpaye Hospital	3.399383°S 30.352223°E
Buhumuza (in former Ruyigi)	Kinyinya	Kinyinya Hospital	3.65538°S 30.34302°E
Buhumuza (in former Ruyigi)	Kinyinya	Gisuru Hospital	3.4566°S 30.50017°E
Buhumuza (in former Ruyigi)	Butezi	Butezi Hospital	3.38958°S 30.16413°E

== See also ==
- Health in Burundi

== Sources ==
- Carte Sanitaire du Burundi (PDF), Burundi Ministry of Public Health, 2016
- Medical Resources List (PDF), United States Embassy in Burundi
