= Mutaho Hospital =

Geography
- Location: Mutoyi, Gitega Province, Burundi
- Coordinates: 3.15419°S 29.86264°E

Organisation
- Care system: Public

Links
- Lists: Hospitals in Burundi

The Mutaho District Hospital (French: Hôpital de District de Mutaho) is a hospital in Gitega Province, Burundi.

== Location ==
Mutaho Hospital is a in the city of Mutaho, in the north of the Mutaho Health District. It is one of two hospitals in the district, the other being the faith-based Mutoyi Hospital. It is a public hospital serving a population of 100,155 as of 2014.

In January 2022 construction of a three-storey mother-child building was in progress. A modern X-Ray service would soon be operational.

== Sources ==
- Carte Sanitaire du Burundi (PDF), Burundi Ministry of Public Health, 2016
- Financement base sur la performance HD Mutaho (in French), Ministere de la Sante Publique et de la Lutte Contre le Sida
- Ndikuriyo, Appolinaire (15 January 2022), "Hôpital Mutaho : Vers la construction du bâtiment mère-enfant", Le Renouveau (in French)
