= Rushakashaka =

- Location in Burundi
- Coordinates: 3°7′33″S 29°18′18″E
- Country: Burundi
- Province: Bubanza Province
- Commune: Commune of Gihanga
- Time zone: UTC+2 (Central Africa Time)

Rushakashaka is a village in the Commune of Gihanga in Bubanza Province in north western Burundi.
