= Gihungwe =

- Location in Burundi
- Coordinates: 3°9′S 29°15′E
- Country: Burundi
- Province: Bubanza Province
- Commune: Commune of Gihanga
- Time zone: UTC+2 (Central Africa Time)

Gihungwe is a village in the Commune of Gihanga in Bubanza Province in north western Burundi, near the border of the Democratic Republic of the Congo.
