= Nyeshanga =

- Location in Burundi
- Coordinates: 3°12′20″S 29°19′10″E
- Country: Burundi
- Province: Bubanza Province
- Commune: Commune of Gihanga
- Time zone: UTC+2 (Central Africa Time)

Nyeshanga is a village in the Commune of Gihanga in Bubanza Province in north western Burundi.
