= Commune of Giteranyi =

Coordinates: 2°31′20″S 30°27′13″E

- Commune
- Interactive map of Commune of Giteranyi
- Country: Burundi
- Province: Muyinga Province
- Administrative center: Giteranyi
- Time zone: UTC+2 (Central Africa Time)

The commune of Giteranyi is a commune of Muyinga Province in northeastern Burundi. The capital lies at Giteranyi.
