= Mutoyi Hospital =

Geography
- Location: Mutoyi, Gitega Province, Burundi
- Coordinates: 3.21899°S 29.97684°E

Organisation
- Care system: Public

Links
- Lists: Hospitals in Burundi

The Mutoyi Hospital (French: Hôpital de Mutoyi) is a hospital in Gitega Province, Burundi.

== Location ==
Mutoyi Hospital is a faith-based hospital in the city of Mutoyi, in the east of the Mutaho Health District. It is one of two hospitals in the district, the other being the Mutaho Hospital. It is a private hospital serving a population of 100,155 as of 2014. The Mutoyi Hospital belongs to the Archdiocese of Gitega, and is part of CED-Caritas Burundi. It is managed by Volontari Italiani per la Solidarietà ai Paesi Emergenti (VISPE).

== Events ==
Mutoyi Hospital was founded in 1973 as the Mutoyi Health Center. In October 2003, the Ministry of Public Health and the Fight against AIDS recognized it as a First Reference Hospital. In February 2017 Japan granted US$67,717 to the hospital to build a pre-delivery shelter for pregnant women.

As of 2020 the hospital had 350 beds and more than 200 employees. It had operating rooms, consultation rooms and laboratories. On average there were 4,500 births there each year.

== Sources ==
- Carte Sanitaire du Burundi (PDF), Burundi Ministry of Public Health, 2016
- Financement base sur la performance HD Kibuye (in French), Ministere de la Sante Publique et de la Lutte Contre le Sida
- Kurubone, Alfred (9 February 2017), Le Japon octroi une aide de 67.717 US$ à l’Hôpital de Mutoyi (in French), Radio Télévision Nationale du Burundi
- Ospedale Mutoyi: una data storica (in Italian), VISPE – Volontari Italiani per la Solidarietà ai Paesi Emergenti ETS, 17 November 2020
- Sakaganwa, Jean Pierre (2017), 5ème Lettre à Mon cher ami Bien aimé de Munzenze (in French), Ministry of Public Health and the fight against AIDS
