= Kagwena =

- Location in Burundi
- Coordinates: 3°7′37″S 29°15′30″E
- Country: Burundi
- Province: Bubanza Province
- Commune: Commune of Gihanga
- Time zone: UTC+2 (Central Africa Time)

Kagwena is a village in the Commune of Gihanga in Bubanza Province in northwestern Burundi.
