= Gihanga, Burundi =

Gihanga
- Location in Burundi
- Coordinates: 3°11′41″S 29°17′43″E
- Country: Burundi
- Province: Bubanza Province
- Commune: Commune of Gihanga
- Time zone: UTC+2 (Central Africa Time)

Gihanga is a town in the Commune of Gihanga in Bubanza Province in northwestern Burundi. It is the capital of the Commune of Gihanga.

The town is home to Gihanga Hospital, one of three in Bubanza Province.
