= Muyange =

- Location in Burundi
- Coordinates: 3°7′52″S 29°20′5″E
- Country: Burundi
- Province: Bubanza Province
- Commune: Commune of Gihanga

Muyange is a city in northwest Burundi.
