= Rema Hospital =

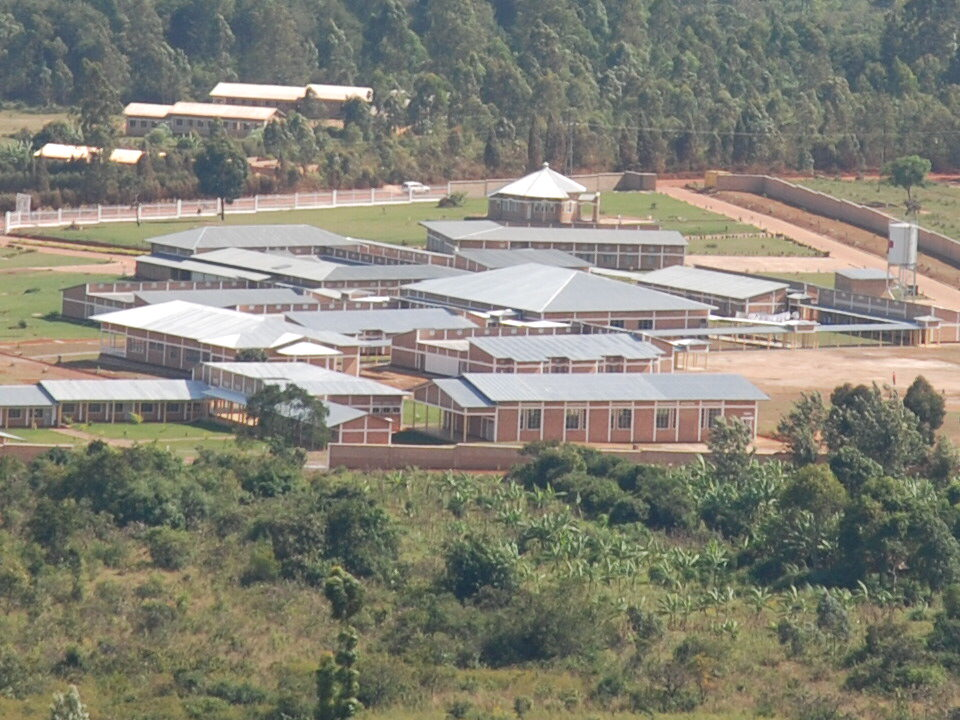
- Rema Hospital in June 2009

- Location within Burundi

Geography
- Location: Ruyigi Province, Burundi
- Coordinates: 3.46979°S 30.25887°E

Organisation
- Care system: Public

Links
- Lists: Hospitals in Burundi

The Rema Hospital (Note: The name is often capitalized as REMA, but Rema seems more appropriate, since it a Kirundi word.) (French: Hôpital Rema) is a hospital in the town of Ruyigi in the northwest of Ruyigi Province, Burundi. It was founded in 2008, and once was flourishing, but by 2017 it had fallen into disrepair.

== Location ==
The Rema Hospital is in the Ruyigi health district, as are the nearby Ruyigi Hospital in the settlement of Ruyigi and the faith-based Cimpaye Hospital to the east. It is on the RN13 national highway just east of the town of Ruyigi.

== Service ==
The Rema Hospital serves the Ruyigi health district, and also receives patients from nearby provinces. The Ministry of Health reports that the status is public but does not give the target area population or quality of service metrics.

== History ==
A center for mother and child care was built in 2007 by the Belgian and Burundian armies on land near Ruyigi owned by the family of Maggy Barankitse. The hospital was developed on the same site. The embassies of France, Germany and Luxembourg, the UNHCR and the Jean-François Peterbroeck Foundation provided support.

Rema Hospital was founded by Maison Shalom, which manages it, and inaugurated on 22 January 2008. In the Kirundi language Rema means providing comfort to a person who is experiencing difficulties. The hospital serves mothers and children, and tries to reduce the mortality rate of pregnant women. It includes a center for teaching about hygiene, nutrition, vaccines and birth control.

In October 2013 the Maison Shalom held a celebration of its 20th anniversary in the Rema Hospital grounds, attended by guests from the national government, UN organization representatives, ambassadors and other Europeans and Americans. Gervais Rufyikiri, Second Vice-president of Burundi, inaugurated the Maison Candice and Maison Nathan, a neonatology unit.

On 4 November 2015 the Attorney General of Burundi ordered that the accounts of Maison Shalom be frozen. The state took over the hospital. A 2017 report on its condition noted that there were now only ten patients. The incubators were no longer working, pipes were broken, lamps had not been replaced, the grass was not mowed and a police position was occupying the maternal and child protection center.

Following an influx of refugees from Democratic Republic of Congo, the hospital was used to treat patients with conditions too complex to be treated at the Busuma refugee site.

== Sources ==
- Burundi – The Rema Hospital – 2007, Friends of Humanity, 1 June 2007
- Carte Sanitaire du Burundi (PDF), Burundi Ministry of Public Health, 2016
- Financement base sur la performance HD REMAII 2016 (in French), Ministere de la Sante Publique et de la Lutte Contre le Sida
- Hopital REMA, EAHRC
- "HÔPITAL REMA", Petit Futé, 2024
- Manirakiza, Fabrice (5 November 2013), "20 years of Maison Shalom: "Today, we celebrate the victory of love over hate!"", Iwacu
- Manirakiza, Fabrice (14 February 2017), "Rema Hospital in Ruyigi: an abandoned jewel", Iwacu
- "Way: Hôpital REMA (240812352)", OpenStreetMap
