= Buye Hospital =

Geography
- Location: Ngozi Province, Burundi
- Coordinates: 2.8627°S 29.81936°E

Organisation
- Care system: Public

Links
- Lists: Hospitals in Burundi

The Buye Hospital (French: ️Hôpital de Buye) is a district hospital in Ngozi Province, Burundi.

== Location ==
As of 2016 the Buye Hospital was only hospital in the Buye Health District. The hospital served a target population of 202,385 as of 2014. The hospital was built in 1936. Departments include Pediatrics, Internal Medicine, Maternity, Malnutrition and Surgery.

== Events ==
A review of progress in improving the public health system in Ngozi Province published in May 2012 found that the evaluation report for Buye Hospital was superficial, and several indicators that were clearly unsatisfactory were given scores of 100%. Infrastructure in the province was generally adequate, but there were some gaps, particularly at the Buye Hospital.

In 2017 the staff of the Buye Hospital accused the medical director of using the hospital's service vehicle for purposes unrelated to the hospital, including moving the children of the director and his neighbours, and moving the commune's football players during matches. Fuel consumption was almost double what it was when the vehicle was used only for hospital missions, and maintenance costs were also higher.

== Sources ==
- Carte Sanitaire du Burundi (PDF), Burundi Ministry of Public Health, 2016
- Financement base sur la performance HD Buye (in French), Ministere de la Sante Publique et de la Lutte Contre le Sida
- La premiere dame a souhaite la joyeuse paque aux malades de l’Hopital Buye (in French), Presidency of Burundi, 18 April 2017
- "Mauvaise gestion des biens de l'hôpital de Buye, le médecin directeur pointé du doigt", Radio Publique Africaine (in French), 4 October 2017
- Revues externes du Programme de Renforcement de la Santé Publique dans les districts de Karongi et Rutsiro, Rwanda, et duProgramme d’Appui au Système de Santé dans la Province de Ngozi Burundi, avec des recommandations prospectives pour un programme santé régional (Rwanda, Burundi) (in French), HERA, Belgium, May 2012
