= Rutana Hospital =

Geography
- Location: Rutana, Rutana Province, Burundi
- Coordinates: 3.929°S 29.993°E

Organisation
- Care system: Public

Links
- Lists: Hospitals in Burundi

The Rutana Hospital (French: Hôpital de Rutana) is a hospital in Rutana Province, Burundi.

== Location ==
The Rutana Hospital is a hospital in the city of Rutana, in the south of the Rutana Health District. It is one of two hospitals in the district, the other being the faith-based Musongati Hospital. It is a public district hospital serving a population of 98,728 as of 2014. The hospital is in the center of the town, south of Rutana Prison Health Center and the Red Cross Rutana Health Center.

== Events ==
In December 2013 the staff of the SYNAPA section of the hospital gave warning that they would start a strike if the problems they had identified were not resolved. These included the use of insurance cards by hospital personnel and the pay deduction retained by the hospital for construction of the operating theater and maternity ward, among others.

In November 2018 the hospital staff accused the director and manager of the hospital of embezzlement. Charges for repair of two ambulances and a Toyota Hilux truck were far in excess of what would be expected.

In February 2019 it was reported that activities at the hospital had been disrupted for over two months. The medical director, Juvénal Kwizera, had gone to Morocco to continue his studies, and had not been replaced. The director's signature was required for withdrawals from the hospital bank account. As a result, some employees were not being paid and purchase of medicine and fuel could not be guaranteed.

== Sources ==
- Carte Sanitaire du Burundi (PDF), Burundi Ministry of Public Health, 2016
- "Direction de l'hôpital de Rutana accusée de malversation", Radio Publique Africaine (in French), 16 November 2018
- Financement base sur la performance HD Rutana (in French), Ministere de la Sante Publique et de la Lutte Contre le Sida
- "Les activités de l'hôpital de Rutana perturbées depuis plus de deux mois", Radio Publique Africaine, 25 February 2019
- "Node: Hôpital de Rutana (2201158895)", OpenStreetMap
- "Préavis de grève du SYNAPA-Rutana", Isanganiro (in French), 13 December 2013
