= Giteranyi =

- settlement
- Location within Burundi
- Coordinates: 2.5172828°S 30.4586140°E
- Country: Burundi
- Province: Muyinga Province
- Commune: Commune of Giteranyi
- Time zone: UTC+2 (Central Africa Time)

Giteranyi is a community in Muyinga Province, Burundi. It is the capital of the Commune of Giteranyi.

== Location ==
Giteranyi is on the RP65 road to the north of Mukoni and south of Ruzo. It is near the border with Tanzania. A road leads east from Giteranyi through Makombe to Mugoma in Tanzania. The Köppen climate classification is: Aw: Tropical savanna, wet.

== Facilities ==
Giteranyi is home to the Giteranyi Hospital and Giteranyi Health District Office.

== Sources ==
- "Burundi : Inauguration de l'Hôpital de Giteranyi à Muyinga", AGnews (in French), 11 July 2017
- "Giteranyi, Muyinga Province, Burundi", Mindat
- "Node: Giteranyi (3084743284)", OpenStreetMap
- Nkurunziza, Dieudonné (18 November 2021), Le district sanitaire de Giteranyi vient de se doter d'une nouvelle infrastructure (in French), RTN: Radio Télévision Nationale du Burundi
