= Fota Hospital =

Geography
- Location: Fota, Mwaro Province, Burundi
- Coordinates: 3.43987°S 29.70352°E

Organisation
- Care system: Public

Links
- Lists: Hospitals in Burundi

The Fota District Hospital (French: Hôpital de District Fota) is a hospital in Mwaro Province, Burundi.

== Location ==
The Fota Hospital is a public district hospital in the Fota Health District serving a population of 161,667 as of 2014. It is in the city of Fota. As of 2016 it was the only hospital in the district.

== Events ==
In November 2020 staff at the hospital complained that the managers were embezzling funds. For example, a supposedly new refrigerator had been bought for three times its market price, and only worked a few days. It was a simple household refrigerator that did not meet WHO standards. As a result, medicines that had to be kept frozen or cold were deteriorating.

In February 2021 the director of Fota Hospital was again accused of embezzling funds. A large amount of money was collected by withholding the staff incentive bonuses. They were informed that this had been approved by the Ministry of health. It was said to be for use in building a fence, but after more than six months the work had not started.

== Sources ==
- Carte Sanitaire du Burundi (PDF), Burundi Ministry of Public Health, 2016
- Financement base sur la performance HD Fota (in French), Ministere de la Sante Publique et de la Lutte Contre le Sida
- "La mauvaise gestion des responsables de l'hôpital de Fota dénoncée par le personnel", Radio Publique Africaine (in French), 25 November 2020
- "Mwaro : Soupçons de détournement de fonds à l'hôpital de Fota", Radio Inzamba (in French), 3 February 2021
