= Mphande =

Mphande is a surname. Notable people with the surname include:

- David Mphande (1938–2018), Malawian politician and educator
- Gift Mphande (born 2003), Zambian footballer
- Lyton Mphande (born 1963), Malawian boxer

== See also ==
- Mpanda (disambiguation)
- Mpande (1798–1872), monarch of the Zulu Kingdom
- Joseph Mpande (born 1994), Ugandan footballer
