= Kiremba Hospital =

Geography
- Location: Kiremba, Ngozi Province, Burundi
- Coordinates: 2.8224°S 29.982127°E

Organisation
- Care system: Public

Links
- Lists: Hospitals in Burundi

The Renato Monolo Hospital of Kiremba (French: ️Hôpital Renato Monolo de Kiremba) is a faith-based district hospital in Ngozi Province, Burundi.

== Location ==
As of 2016 the Kiremba Hospital was only hospital in the Kiremba Health District. The hospital served a target population of 259,925 as of 2014.

== Events ==
The Renato Monolo Hospital of Kiremba was a gift of the Second Vatican Council (1963–1965).

In August 2023 Evariste Ndayishimiye, President of Burundi, inaugurated the mother-child building at the hospital. The new building added over 200 beds to the existing 213 beds. It also included an operating theatre and rooms for maternity, neonatology and consulting. The hospital employed 200 people, of whom only eight were state employees.

== Sources ==
- Carte Sanitaire du Burundi (PDF), Burundi Ministry of Public Health, 2016
- Financement base sur la performance HD Kiremba (in French), Ministere de la Sante Publique et de la Lutte Contre le Sida
- Le chef de l'Etat a inauguré le bâtiment mère enfant à l'hôpital de Kiremba (in French), Agence Burundaise de Presse, 3 August 2023
