= Mivo Hospital =

Geography
- Location: Ngozi Province, Burundi
- Coordinates: 2.9486°S 29.79108°E

Organisation
- Care system: Public

Links
- Lists: Hospitals in Burundi

The Mivo Hospital of Mary, Mother of the Divine Providence (French: ️Hôpital Marie Mère de la Providence Divine de Mivo) is a district hospital in Ngozi Province, Burundi.

== Location ==
The Mivo Hospital is in the Catholic Parish of Mivo, about 6 kilometres (3.7 mi) southwest of the city of Ngozi. The faith-based Mivo Hospital is one of two hospitals in the Ngozi Health District, the other being the Ngozi Hospital.

== Services ==
The Mivo Hospital served a target population of 154,122 as of 2014. The hospital began offering physiotherapy services in 2011 under a program sponsored by the APEFE (Association pour la Promotion de l'Education et de la Formation à l'Etranger) of Belgium.

== Sources ==
- Carte Sanitaire du Burundi (PDF), Burundi Ministry of Public Health, 2016
- Création d'un réseau de centres de réadaptation physique dans les hôpitaux du Burundi (in French), APEFE
- Financement base sur la performance HD Mivo (in French), Ministere de la Sante Publique et de la Lutte Contre le Sida
- "Hôpital Marie Mère De La Providence Divine De Mivo", Google Maps
