= Kibimba Hospital =

Geography
- Location: Kibimba, Gitega Province, Burundi
- Coordinates: 3.2958256°S 29.79917°E

Organisation
- Care system: Public

Links
- Lists: Hospitals in Burundi

The Kibimba Hospital (French: Hôpital de Kibimba) is a faith-based hospital in Gitega Province, Burundi.

== Location ==
The Kibimba Hospital is in the city of Kibimba, in the extreme northwest of the Gitega Health District. The only other hospital in this district is the Gitega Regional Hospital in the center. It is a private hospital serving a population of 62,014 as of 2014.

== Events ==
The hospital was opened in 1952 by American missionaries. Operations were disrupted during the Burundian Civil War. In 2006 the missionaries returned, and called on the surgeon Dr. Elysée Nahimana to manage the hospital, which at first had only six nurses.

In May 2011 eight doctors from Stichting Interplast Holland came to Kibimba Hospital at the invitation of Izere, an association of the Burundi diaspora in Holland. They operated for five days on patients suffering from deformities such as harelips or scarring from burns. They were not able to operate on all the people who had travelled to the hospital in the hope of having an operation, and promised to return later to continue their work.

As of 2012 the 198-bed hospital was treating patients from remote area such as Makamba and Cankuzo, who could not receive surgery at home and were drawn by the hospital's reputation for good quality care. Many of the patients were poor and could not afford to pay their bills.

The hospital in 2017 had recently developed its surgical department.

As of April 2019 the hospital had 50 nurses and five doctors, including a specialist. There was a maternity block for 60 women and a pediatric block. The operating room and sterilization room had been rehabilitated.

The hospital contacted the "MPR Development" program in 2017 for help in creating a physiotherapy department. An existing building was converted for this purpose, and equipment was installed between October 2019 and June 2020 at a cost of 15,677 euros.

In March 2024 Evariste Ndayishimiye, President of Burundi, visited the hospital and gave out food assistance to the poorest patients. He also visited the site of a three-storey extension to the hospital that was being built to accommodate pregnant women and sick children under 5 years old.

== Sources ==
- Carte Sanitaire du Burundi (PDF), Burundi Ministry of Public Health, 2016
- Deux nouveaux services de kinésithérapie opérationnels dans les hôpitaux du Burundi (in French), Association pour la Promotion de l'Education et de la Formation à l'Etranger - APEFE
- Financement base sur la performance HD Kibimba (in French), Ministere de la Sante Publique et de la Lutte Contre le Sida
- "Gitega (Kibimba) : la Hollande soigne les enfants burundais", Iwacu (in French), 30 May 2011
- Le Président NDAYISHIMIYE offre une assistance aux malades de l’hôpital de Kibimba (in French), Maison Ntare Rushatsi, 24 March 2024
- "L'hôpital de Kibimba victime de sa renommée", Iwacu (in French), 2 December 2012
- Sakaganwa, Jean Pierre (April 2019), "Hôpital de Kibimba: des performances en peu de temps" (PDF), Panorama (in French), Ministère de la Santé Publique et de la lutte contre le SIDA
