= Cimpaye Hospital =

Geography
- Location: Ruyigi Province, Burundi
- Coordinates: 3.399383°S 30.352223°E

Organisation
- Care system: Public

Links
- Lists: Hospitals in Burundi

The Ibitaro Cimpaye Sicilia de Rusengo Hospital is a hospital in the east of Ruyigi Province, Burundi.

== Location ==
The Cimpaye Hospital is in the Ruyigi health district, as are the Ruyigi Hospital and Rema Hospital in the town of Ruyigi to the east.

== History ==
The Ibitaro Cimpaye Sicilia Hospital was built in 2005 with funds from the Regione Siciliana in 2005, but left unfinished. With assistance from the San Raffaele Foundation of Cefalù work was restarted in 2010 and the hospital was opened in June 2012. The foundation built the water, electricity and sewage lines, provided equipment and furniture. It has maternity, pediatric, neonatal intensive care, medicine and surgery departments, a laboratory and general pharmacy. It is owned by the Diocese of Ruyigi.

The first birth at the hospital occurred on 7 July 2012, the fifth child of a Burundian mother. She was named Cimpaye, which means Gift of God in the Kirundi language.

In February 2018 it was reported that Totò Cuffaro, the former President of the Sicilian Region, was returning to the Ibitaro Cimpaye Sicilia as a volunteer doctor. He was a qualified doctor, but had been permanently struck off the register of the medical association after being convicted of revealing official secrets and aiding and abetting the mafia. However, he could still practice in Burundi.

As of 2024 the Burundi Ministry of Public Health recorded the hospital as "approved" but did not give any further details.

== Sources ==
- Burundi: Un nuevo hospital en Rusengo para dar esperanza (in Spanish), UMOYA, 12 June 2012
- Carte Sanitaire du Burundi (PDF), Burundi Ministry of Public Health, 2016
- Financement base sur la performance HD Cimpaye Sicilia de Rusengo (in French), Ministere de la Sante Publique et de la Lutte Contre le Sida
- L'ex presidente della Regione Totò Cuffaro torna in Burundi per fare il medico volontario (in Italian), AgrigentoNotizie, 7 February 2018
- L’ospedale "Ibitaro Cimpaye Sicilia" (in Italian), Fondazione Istituto San Raffaele G. Giglio di Cefalù
- Primo nato nell'ospedale Cimpaye Sicilia in Burundi (in Italian), Quale Cefalù, 10 July 2012
