= Makamba Hospital =

MakambaHospital

Geography
- Location: Makamba, Makamba Province, Burundi
- Coordinates: 4.13679°S 29.81267°E

Organisation
- Care system: Public

Links
- Lists: Hospitals in Burundi

The Makamba District Hospital (French: Hôpital de District Makamba) is a hospital in Makamba Province, Burundi.

== Location ==
The Makamba Hospital is a hospital in the city of Makamba, in the northwest of the Makamba Health District. As of 2016 it was the only hospital in the district. It is a public district hospital serving a population of 279,000 as of 2010. (Note: The health ministry entry for Makamba Hospital says it served 279 people as of 2010. However, it says the province of Makamba served 516,460 as of 2014, and the Nyanza-Lac district, the second district in the province, served 206,795 as of 2014. Presumably 279 should read 279,000.)

== Events ==
In November 2017 a center for victims of gender-based violence was inaugurated at Makamba Hospital. Men and women were to be assisted free of charge by doctors, magistrates and psychologists.

In December 2021 it was reported that employees who had tested positive for COVID-19 were being forced to continue working, presumably causing the disease to spread among patients and there contacts.

== Sources ==
- Bigitimana, Raphaël (5 November 2017), "Un centre intégré pour les victimes des VBG inauguré à l'hôpital de Makamba", Radio Télévision Nationale du Burundi (in French)
- Carte Sanitaire du Burundi (PDF), Burundi Ministry of Public Health, 2016
- Financement base sur la performance HD Makamba (in French), Ministere de la Sante Publique et de la Lutte Contre le Sida
- "Makamba : Négligence et terreur de la direction de l'hôpital principal aux dépens de la santé du personnel et de la population", Radio Inzamba (in French), 23 December 2021
