= Buhiga Hospital =

Geography
- Location: Buhiga, Karusi Province, Burundi
- Coordinates: 3.03347°S 30.15834°E

Organisation
- Care system: Public

Links
- Lists: Hospitals in Burundi

The Buhiga Hospital (French: Hôpital de Buhiga) is a hospital in Karusi Province, Burundi.

== Location ==
The Buhiga Hospital is a hospital in the town of Buhiga, in the center of the Buhiga Health District. It is one of two hospitals in the district, the other being the Natwe Turashoboye Hospital. It is a district hospital serving a population of 270,296 as of 2014.

== Events ==
Karuzi is one of the poorest provinces in Burundi. Most of the inhabitant travel only by bicycle or motorbike. Patients who could not afford to rent a motorbike might decide to stay at home, endangering their life. In June 2022 it was reported that a modern ambulance had been donated to the hospital by "Twiteho Amagara".

== Sources ==
- Carte Sanitaire du Burundi (PDF), Burundi Ministry of Public Health, 2016
- Financement base sur la performance HD Buhiga (in French), Ministere de la Sante Publique et de la Lutte Contre le Sida
- "Province Karuzi : la fin de l'ère des bicyclettes grâce au don d'ambulance" (PDF), Resilience Magazine (in French), June 2022
