= Murore Hospital =

Geography
- Location: Murore, Cankuzo Province, Burundi
- Coordinates: 3.18752°S 30.664°E

Organisation
- Care system: Public

Links
- Lists: Hospitals in Burundi

The Murore Hospital (French: Hôpital de Murore) is a hospital in Cankuzo Province, Burundi.

== Location ==
The Murore Hospital is a hospital in the city of Murore, in the west of the Murore Health District. It is the only hospital in the district.

The hospital is in the north of the town, to the north of the RN21 highway. It is east of the Murore United Methodist Church. The Murore Centre de Santé is in the hospital. It is a public district hospital serving a population of 169,038 as of 2014.

== Events ==
On 16 December 2020 the Minister of Health, Thaddée Ndikumana, gave maternity and neonatal equipment worth $36,000 to Cankuzo Hospital and Murore Hospital during the launch of Mother Child Health Week.

On 23 February 2022 it was reported that the Murore Hospital had lacked water for a week, and cleaning was almost impossible. Some rainwater collected in tanks was available, but in small quantities and not enough for the patients' needs. The cause was a lightening strike on the pumps that supplied water from the Rusumo hydroelectric center. The managers of the hydroelectric center had promised that a replacement machine would arrive very soon.

The hospital lost power in February 2023 due to a transformer being struck by lightening. The generator that took over during the outage broke down. On 24 March 2023 it was reported that more than a month later some services were no longer functioning in the radiology, pediatrics and neonatology departments, including incubators and cesarean section instruments. The electricity company was planning to replace the transformer next week.

On 22 September 2023 it was reported that the hospital had been without electricity or water for six days. The electricity failure meant that the electric pump that supplied drinking water no longer worked. The maternity and minor surgery departments were the most affected. Cleaning was not possible. Patients had to go to nearby households to buy water.

== Sources ==
- "A plus d'un mois l'hôpital du district sanitaire de Murore et toute la localité sans courant électrique", Agence Burundaise de Presse (in French), 27 March 2023
- "Cankuzo : L'hôpital de Murore sans eau ni électricité depuis une semaine", Radio Publique Africaine (in French), 22 September 2023
- Carte Sanitaire du Burundi (PDF), Burundi Ministry of Public Health, 2016
- Financement base sur la performance HD Murore (in French), Ministere de la Sante Publique et de la Lutte Contre le Sida
- "L'hôpital Murore fait face à la pénurie d'eau", Agence Burundaise de Presse (in French), 23 February 2022
- "Murore District Hospital", Google Maps
- Nahimana, Pascal (22 December 2020), "Réception d'équipements médicaux aux hôpitaux de CANKUZO et MURORE", Burundi Forum (in French)
- "Way: Hôpital Murore (785864852)", OpenStreetMap
