= Kinyinya Hospital =

Geography
- Location: Ruyigi Province, Burundi
- Coordinates: 3.65538°S 30.34302°E

Organisation
- Care system: Public

Links
- Lists: Hospitals in Burundi

The Kinyinya Hospital (French: Hôpital de Kinyinya) is a hospital in Ruyigi Province, Burundi.

== Location ==
The Kinyinya Hospital is a public district hospital in the Kinyinya Health District serving a population of 122,249 as of 2014. It is in the southwest of the district. The Gisuru Hospital is in the northeast. The hospital is near the center of the town of Kinyinya, north of the RN11 highway, on the east side of the RP72 road.

== Events ==
In January 2018 seven nurses from the hospital were arrested, and transferred to the provincial capital, Ruyigi. They were accused of having told the Radio Publique Africaine's HUMURA BURUNDI magazine about the contributions demanded from all civil servants at the hospital to be used for construction of communal infrastructure. It seems that they were chosen because they were not natives of the province and were on poor terms with their administrative and financial director.

In May 2023 the World Bank issued a request for tenders to build a maternity unit at the hospital.

In August 2023 employees of the hospital accused the medical director and the manager of the hospital of withholding sums from their employee bonuses without their consent. They are told the withdrawals are to help development of the commune, or of the CNDD-FDD political party.

== Sources ==
- Carte Sanitaire du Burundi (PDF), Burundi Ministry of Public Health, 2016
- Extension de I'ECOFO Musumba et construction d'une maternite a l'hopital Kinyinya de la commune Kinyinya en province Ruyigi (in French), World Bank
- Financement base sur la performance HD Kinyinya (in French), Ministere de la Sante Publique et de la Lutte Contre le Sida
- L’administration impliquée dans l’emprisonnement des 7 infirmiers de RUYIGI (in French), Radio Publique Africaine, 16 January 2018
- "Ruyigi : Les responsables de l'hôpital Kinyinya accusés d'abus de pouvoir", Radio Publique Africaine (in French), 3 August 2023
- "Way: Hopital de Kinyinya (315726106)", OpenStreetMap
