= Mabayi Hospital =

Geography
- Location: Mabayi, Cibitoke Province, Burundi
- Coordinates: 2.71215°S 29.24422°E

Organisation
- Care system: Public

Links
- Lists: Hospitals in Burundi

The Mabayi Hospital (French: Hôpital de Mabayi) is a hospital in Cibitoke Province, Burundi.

== Location ==
Mabayi Hospital is located in the city of Mabayi, in the northern part of the Mabayi Health District. As the sole hospital in the district, it serves as a public district hospital for a population of 242,469 as of 2014. The hospital is situated on the east side of the RN22 highway in northern Mabayi. This highway extends north past Ruhororo to the Rwanda border, where it becomes the DR1.

In 2012, the hospital employed 128 permanent staff across all levels.

== Sources ==
- Carte Sanitaire du Burundi (PDF), Burundi Ministry of Public Health, 2016
- Financement base sur la performance HD Mabayi (in French), Ministere de la Sante Publique et de la Lutte Contre le Sida
- Mpabpnyimana, Jackson (2012), Etude de l'effet du financement basé sur la performance sur la motivation du personnel de santé, une étude transversale à visée analytique effectuée à l'hôpital de district de Mabayi au Burundi (in French)
- "Way: Hôpital Mabayi (784875120)", OpenStreetMap
