= Giteranyi Hospital =

Geography
- Location: Muyinga Province, Burundi
- Coordinates: 2.5172828°S 30.4586140°E

Organisation
- Care system: Public

History
- Opened: 8 July 2017

Links
- Lists: Hospitals in Burundi

The Giteranyi Hospital (French: Hôpital de district sanitaire de Giteranyi) is a hospital in Giteranyi, Muyinga Province, Burundi.

== History ==
President Pierre Nkurunziza inaugurated the Giteranyi Health District Hospital on 8 July 2017, one of a series of works carried out on the 55th anniversary of Burundi's independence. The hospital would meet a pressing need of the people of Muyinga Province. In September 2020 the hospital asked for tenders to complete the internal medicine block of the hospital.

== Health District Office ==
On 18 November 2021 the Minister of Public Health and the Fight against AIDS, Thaddée Ndikumana, inaugurated the Giteranyi Health District Office (French: Bureau du District Sanitaire de Giteranyi). UNICEF built the office with funding from GAVI, the Global Alliance for Vaccines and Immunization, for the government of Burundi. It includes district and supervisors' offices, pharmaceutical stocks, vaccine storage equipment and a meeting room. The district had been based in buildings loaded by the Muyinga Hospital, in the capital of Muyinga Province. The district office is closer to health centers in the area, reducing the risk of damage during transport of vaccines and other supplies.

== Sources ==
- Avis d'Appel d'Offres Ourvert National #14/T/2020-2021... (PDF) (in French), Hôpital de district sanitaire de Giteranyi
- "Burundi : Inauguration de l'Hôpital de Giteranyi à Muyinga", AGnews (in French), 11 July 2017
- Kwizera, Odette (25 October 2022), Renforcement du système de santé à Muyinga grâce aux fonds de l’Alliance mondiale pour les vaccins (in French), Unicef
- Nkurunziza, Dieudonné (18 November 2021), Le district sanitaire de Giteranyi vient de se doter d'une nouvelle infrastructure (in French), RTN: Radio Télévision Nationale du Burundi
