= Gisuru Hospital =

Geography
- Location: Ruyigi Province, Burundi
- Coordinates: 3.4566°S 30.50017°E

Organisation
- Care system: Public

Links
- Lists: Hospitals in Burundi

The Gisuru Hospital (French: Hôpital de Gisuru) is a hospital in Ruyigi Province, Burundi.

== Location ==
The Gisuru Hospital is a public district hospital in the Kinyinya Health District serving a population of 122,249 as of 2014. It is in the northeast of the district. The Kinyinya Hospital is in the southwest. The hospital is in the town of Gisuru, northeast of the Commune of Gisuru headquarters, and just west of the Gisuru health center.

== Events ==
In 2019 ten toilets were rehabilitated at the hospital, and a large septic tank installed.

In January 2013 students from the Gisuru Paramedical School protested on the streets against poor conditions for studying, high tuition fees and lack of enough teachers. Police sent to the scene began to beat them, and two were seriously injured while another had leg injuries. The students were demanding gasoline for the generator so they could have electricity. The school had 86 students, all interns at Gisuru Hospital. The school should receive 200 litres (44 imp gal; 53 US gal) of gasoline per month for the school vehicle and the generator.

== Sources ==
- Carte Sanitaire du Burundi (PDF), Burundi Ministry of Public Health, 2016
- Financement base sur la performance HD Gisuru (in French), Ministere de la Sante Publique et de la Lutte Contre le Sida
- "Les élèves de l'École paramédicale de Gisuru (Ruyigi) reprennent les cours après une grève", Iwacu (in French), 5 May 2013
- Rapport de l’atelier de revue annuelle (PDF) (in French), Gitega: United Nations Development Programme, October 2019
- "Way: Hopital Gisuru (873097082)", OpenStreertMap
