= Murira =

- Location in Burundi
- Coordinates: 3°10′50″S 29°20′30″E
- Country: Burundi
- Province: Bubanza Province
- Commune: Commune of Gihanga
- Time zone: UTC+2 (Central Africa Time)

Murira is a village in the Commune of Gihanga in Bubanza Province in north western Burundi.

== Notable residents ==
- Eliane Becks Nininahazwe
