= Butezi Hospital =

Geography
- Location: Ruyigi Province, Burundi
- Coordinates: 3.38958°S 30.16413°E

Organisation
- Care system: Public

Links
- Lists: Hospitals in Burundi

The Butezi Hospital (French: Hôpital de Butezi, Tswana: Ibitalo ya Butezi) is a hospital in the community of Butezi in the northwest of Ruyigi Province, Burundi.

== Location ==
The Butezi Hospital is the center of the Butezi health district, which covers the west and northwest of the province. It is in the northeast of the community of Butezi, to the north of the primary school.

== Service ==
The hospital is private, and quality of service metrics are not available. As of 2014 the hospital served a target population of 106,691.

== History ==
A 1994 description of the eastern regions of Burundi described the hospital of Butezi as impressive because of its very modern equipment, and also praised the Butezi health center (CDS) for teaching trades such as brickmaking, carpentry and sewing.

A 2011 report stated that the health district served a population of 104,821. The hospital was not supplied with electricity on the day it was inspected. The Butezi health district did not have an ambulance, but did have a motorized vehicle for transfer of patients.

In December 2015 the OPEC Fund for International Development approved a grant to improve electricity services in four rural areas in Burundi, including Butezi through rehabilitation of micro and mini hydroelectric plants, photovoltaic reinforcement and grid upgrades. The hospital was among facilities that benefited from the project.

== Sources ==
- Carte Sanitaire du Burundi (PDF), Burundi Ministry of Public Health, 2016
- Evaluation des Besoins en matière de Soins Obstétricaux et Néonatals d'Urgence au Burundi (EB-SONU) (PDF) (in French), Ministry of Health, March 2011
- Financement base sur la performance HD Butezi (in French), Ministere de la Sante Publique et de la Lutte Contre le Sida
- Les régions orientales du Burundi (in French), Paris: Editions Karthala, 1994, ISBN 978-2-86537-515-8
- Rural Electrification in Burundi, OPEC Fund for International Development, 16 December 2016
- "Way: Ibitalo ya Butezi (226094321)", OpenStreetMap
