= Mpanda, Gihanga =

- Location in Burundi
- Coordinates: 3°12′45″S 29°21′20″E
- Country: Burundi
- Province: Bubanza Province
- Commune: Commune of Gihanga
- Time zone: UTC+2 (Central Africa Time)

Mpanda, Gihanga is a village in the Commune of Gihanga in Bubanza Province in northwestern Burundi.
