= Rutovu Hospital =

Geography
- Location: Rutovu, Bururi Province, Burundi
- Coordinates: 3.8811°S 29.84491°E

Organisation
- Care system: Public

Links
- Lists: Hospitals in Burundi

The Rutovu Hospital (French: Hôpital de Rutovu) is a hospital in Bururi Province, Burundi.

== Location ==
The hospital is a district hospital in the southeast of the Matana Health District, which serves the north of Bururi Province. It is a public district hospital serving a population of 90,709 as of 2014. The Rutovu Hospital is supported by Czech doctors. As of 2016 the only other hospitals in the province were the Bururi Hospital and the Matana Hospital. The hospital is in the southwest of the town of Rutovu.

== Events ==
In August 2014 two nurses were arrested in possession of dental equipment that had been stolen from the hospital. In September 2014 the director of the hospital was arrested, the fifth employee to be arrested in connection with repeated theft of medical equipment from the hospital. Thefts included dental equipment, microscopes, a biochemistry device and the ultrasound machine.

== Sources ==
- Carte Sanitaire du Burundi (PDF), Burundi Ministry of Public Health, 2016
- Financement base sur la performance HD Rutovu (in French), Ministere de la Sante Publique et de la Lutte Contre le Sida
- Nzorubonanya, Félix (17 September 2014), "Hôpital de Rutovu : 5 personnes arrêtées pour vol de matériel médical", Iwacu (in French)
- Une avancée dans la lute contre les vols à l’hôpital de Rutovu (in French), Radio Publique Africaine, 27 August 2014
- "Way: Hopital de Rutovu (784409782)", OpenStreetMap
