= Muyinga Hospital =

Geography
- Location: Muyinga, Muyinga Province, Burundi
- Coordinates: 2.84244°S 30.34470°E

Organisation
- Care system: Public

Links
- Lists: Hospitals in Burundi

The Muyinga Hospital (French: Hôpital de Muyinga) is a hospital in Muyinga Province, Burundi.

== Location ==
Muyinga Hospital is a hospital in the city of Muyinga, in the center of the Muyinga Health District. It is the only hospital in the district. It is a public district hospital serving a population of 423,089 as of 2014. The hospital is near the center of the city, to the southeast of the RN6 highway.

== Services ==
Muyinga Hospital Is a reference for 21 health centres and district hospitals in the provinces of Muyinga, Kirundo, Karusi and Cankuzo. It is one of the largest hospitals in the country with 1,000 beds. As of 2018 it had one of six laboratories in the East African Community that could measure HIV viral load in blood.

== Events ==
The hospital's generator was inadequate and there were routine power cuts, causing serious danger to patients in surgery and babies in neonatology dependent on oxygen. The United Nations Development Programme obtained funding from the European Union, Belgium, France, Switzerland and the Netherlands to obtain a new 250 KVA generator for the hospital, which was installed in December 2018.

In 2022 the hospital's operating theatre was renovated by a consortium of Memisa, Médecins Sans Vacances, Louvain Coopération and Enabel. The new theatre replaced a small, cramped and dilapidated room built in the 1990s, and included operating tables, lighting and surgical equipment. It increased capacity from about 40 operations per week to about 100 per week, and enabled the hospital to treat pathologies that before had to be referred to Bujumbura or to hospitals in other countries.

== Sources ==
- Carte Sanitaire du Burundi (PDF), Burundi Ministry of Public Health, 2016
- Financement base sur la performance HD Muyinga (in French), Ministere de la Sante Publique et de la Lutte Contre le Sida
- Le don d’un groupe électrogène sécurise l’alimentation en électricité de l’hôpital Muyinga (in French), UNDP, 19 December 2018
- "Réhabilitation et équipement du bloc opératoire de l'hôpital de Muyinga" (PDF), Résilience Magazine (in French), European Union, June 2022
- "Way: Hopital de Muyinga (230818902)", OpenStreetMap
