= Mukenke Hospital =

Hospital in Burundi

Geography
- Location: Mukenke, Kirundo Province, Burundi
- Coordinates: 2.58426°S 30.333°E

Organisation
- Care system: Public

Links
- Lists: Hospitals in Burundi

The Mukenke Hospital (French: Hôpital de Mukenke) is a hospital in Kirundo Province, Burundi.

The Mukenke Hospital is the only hospital in the Mukenke Health District. It is a public district hospital with a target population of 136,748 as of 2014.

Solar panels, with storage and an AC converter, supply power for lights, medical equipment and refrigeration.

In June 2022, it was reported that workers at the hospital were claiming the director had started repairing a damaged fence at an exorbitant cost without a call for tenders or award of a contract.

== Sources ==
- Carte Sanitaire du Burundi (PDF), Burundi Ministry of Public Health, 2016
- EDF — electrification of 25 health centres in the provinces of Kirundo, Muyinga, Cankuzo, Ruyigi and Rutana in Burundi, Mercell, 2012
- Financement base sur la performance HD Mukenke (in French), Ministere de la Sante Publique et de la Lutte Contre le Sida
- "Un détournement de fonds rampant à l'hôpital de Mukenke", RPA Radio Publique Africaine (in French), 15 June 2022
