= Matana Hospital =

Geography
- Location: Matana, Bururi Province, Burundi
- Coordinates: 3.76205°S 29.69202°E

Organisation
- Care system: Public

Links
- Lists: Hospitals in Burundi

The Matana Hospital (French: Hôpital de Matana) is a hospital in Bururi Province, Burundi.

== Location ==
The hospital is the district hospital for the Matana Health District, which serves the north of Bururi Province. It is a public district hospital serving a population of 90,709 as of 2014. As of 2016 the only other hospitals in the province were the Bururi Hospital and the Rutovu Hospital.

The hospital is opposite the Anglican church of Matana on the road leading to the Rutovu commune. It houses a general health center. This becomes a youth-friendly health centre on two days of the week, when it provides information to young people on sexual and reproductive health.

== Events ==
On 21 October 2020 Matana Hospital suffered a loss of power when the Regideso transformer in Matana was struck by lightening. Power had still not been restored by 3 November 2020. Flashlights or phones had to be used for light when helping women in labour. Laboratory tests and X-Rays were not possible.

== Sources ==
- Carte Sanitaire du Burundi (PDF), Burundi Ministry of Public Health, 2016
- "Centre de santé ami des jeunes de Matana : un ami que certains ignorent encore", yaga-burundi (in French), 20 September 2022
- Financement base sur la performance HD Matana (in French), Ministere de la Sante Publique et de la Lutte Contre le Sida
- "Paralysie des activités à l'hôpital de Matana suite au manque du courant électrique", Radio Publique Africaine (in French), 3 November 2020
