= Ninga, Burundi =

Ninga
- Location in Burundi
- Coordinates: 3°14′20″S 29°18′50″E
- Country: Burundi
- Province: Bubanza Province
- Commune: Commune of Gihanga
- Time zone: UTC+2 (Central Africa Time)

Ninga is a village in the Commune of Gihanga in Bubanza Province in north western Burundi.
