= Centre Medico-Chirurgical de Kinindo =

Centre Medico-Chirurgical de Kinindo (CMCK)

Geography
- Location: Kinindo, Bujumbura, Burundi
- Coordinates: 3.41736°S 29.35732°E

Organisation
- Care system: Public

Links
- Website: https://cmckhospital.org/
- Lists: Hospitals in Burundi

The Kinindo Medical and Surgical Center (French: Centre Medico-Chirurgical de Kinindo, CMCK) is a private hospital in Bujumbura, Burundi.

== Location ==
The CMCK is in the suburb of Kinindo in the southern part of Bujumbura, on the west side of the RN3 highway. It is opposite the Petit Seminaire to the east. The CMCK is in southern sanitary district of Kinindo.

== Services ==
The CMCK opened on 8 December 1999. It is a referral hospital. It undertakes a wide range of surgical procedures. As of 2019 the CMCK Hospital was one of the best equipped in Burundi.

The CMCK opened a cancer care center in June 2020, where it treats 26 types of cancer. Dr Sylvie Nzeyimana, Minister of Public Health and the fight against AIDS, visited the CMCK on 18 February 2022 during World Cancer Day. She praised the CMCK for taking care of cancer patients, including those with breast cancer and prostate cancer.

== Sources ==
- Burundi: a difficult mission, Royal European Academy of Doctors (RAED), 23 January 2019
- Cancer is one of the diseases that constitute a public health problem, ABP: Burundi News Agency, 22 February 2022
- Centre Medico-Chirurgical de Kinindo (CMCK), READ Health
- Visite du Ministre de la Santé Publique et du Représentant de l’OMS au centre de prise en charge des cancers du CMCK, WHO, 10 April 2021
- "Way: C.M.C.k (784411494)", OpenStreetMap
