= Kayanza Hospital =

Geography
- Location: Kayanza Province, Burundi
- Coordinates: 2.93116°S 29.63113°E

Organisation
- Care system: Public

Links
- Lists: Hospitals in Burundi

The Kayanza Hospital (French: Hôpital de Kayanza) is a hospital in Kayanza Province, Burundi.

== Location ==
Kayanza Hospital is in the town of Kayanza behind the home of Domitien Ndayizeye, former President of Burundi, in front of the Kayanza Technical School and near the Kayanza market.

The hospital is the district hospital for the Kayanza Health District, which serves the northwest of Kayanza Province. It is a public hospital serving a population of 48,475 as of 2014. The only other hospital in the province is the Gahombo Hospital, serving the Gahombo Health District. Kayanza Hospital serves the communes of Kayanza, Muruta, Kabarore and Gatara in Kayanza Province, part of Busiga commune in Ngozi Province and part of Bukinanyana commune in Cibitoke Province.

== Services ==
Services include surgery, laboratory tests, consultations, hospitalization, pediatrics, neonatology, internal medicine, a reception center for children suffering from malnutrition, X-rays, etc. As of 2014 four doctors were paid by the government, one by the hospital, and there were two Cuban general practitioners.

== History ==
Kayanza Hospital was built in 1965 and converted into a hospital in 1968, with just 80 beds. About twenty more beds were funded by German benefactors. In 1986 an X-Ray machine and surgical equipment were donated, and the maternity and pediatric wards were extended.

As of 2014 there were 185 beds. The wards were filled with mostly poor people. Children had to sleep two or three to a bed, and mothers slept two per bed. The effect of crowding included contamination of patients with diarrhea, tuberculosis and other ailments. There was a lack of water, which affected cleaning, and some of the toilets were out of order. The hospital was struggling financially, since the military, the police and others were not paying their bills. Patients often fled the hospital without paying their bills.

== Sources ==
- Carte Sanitaire du Burundi (PDF), Burundi Ministry of Public Health, 2016
- Financement base sur la performance HD Kayanza (in French), Ministere de la Sante Publique et de la Lutte Contre le Sida
- Ndabashinze, Rénovat (1 February 2014), "Hôpital de Kayanza sur la tangente", Iwacu (in French)
