= Mpanda, Mpanda =

Mpanda
- Location in Burundi
- Coordinates: 3°10′15″S 29°24′15″E
- Country: Burundi
- Province: Bubanza Province
- Commune: Commune of Mpanda
- Time zone: UTC+2 (Central Africa Time)

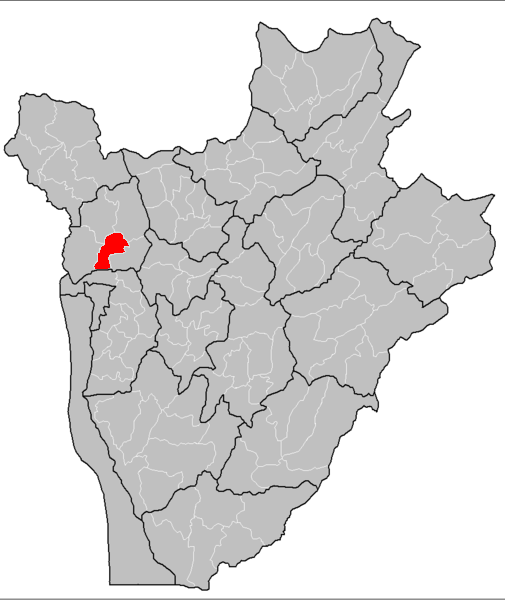
Commune of Mpanda, Bubanza Province, Burundi

Mpanda is a town in the Commune of Mpanda in Bubanza Province in northwestern Burundi.

The settlement lies on the RN 9 highway, which runs north from Bujumbura via Muzinda, Rugazi and Remesha. It is the seat of the Commune of Mpanda.

The Mpanda General Hospital is located in the town, built using Chinese funding and inaugurated in 2011. It is a public regional hospital serving a population of 110,661 as of 2014.

== Sources ==
- Financement base sur la performance HR Mpanda (in French), Ministere de la Sante Publique et de la Lutte Contre le Sida
- "L'Hôpital Général de Mpanda en difficultés", Isanganiro (in French), 27 August 2015
- "Node: Mpanda (1345888970)", OpenStreetMap
