= Kamenge Military Hospital =

Hospital in Bujumbura

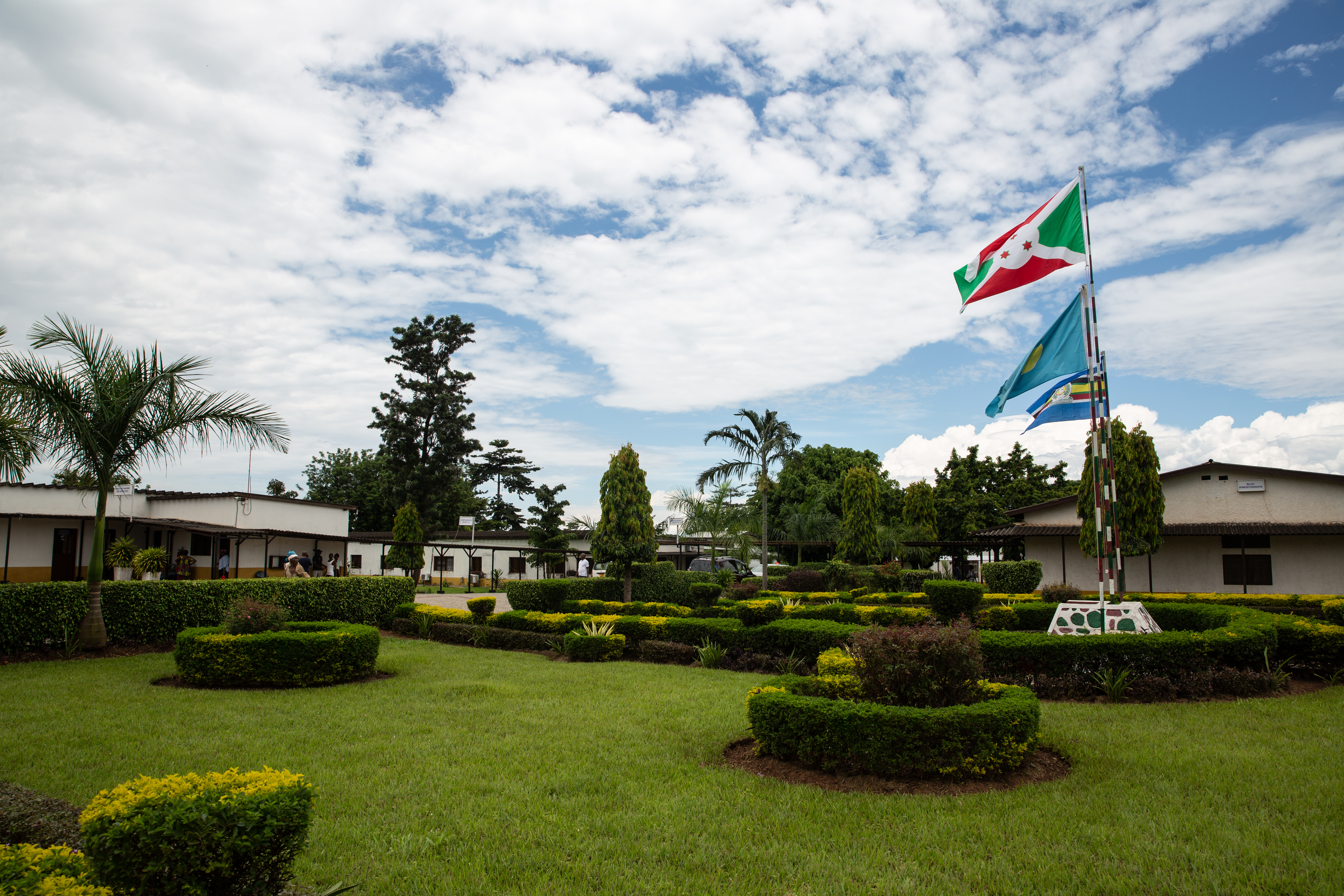
- A view of part of the hospital

- Location within Burundi

Geography
- Location: Bujumbura, Bujumbura Mairie Province, Burundi
- Coordinates: 3.3697°S 29.3872°E

Organisation
- Care system: Public

Links
- Website: www.hmkamenge.bi
- Lists: Hospitals in Burundi

Kamenge Military Hospital (French: Hôpital Militaire de Kamenge, HMK) is a hospital located in Bujumbura, Burundi.

== Location ==
The Kamenge Military Hospital is in the north of Bujumbura on the west side of the Boulevard Mwezi Gisabo, to the north of the University of Burundi and south of the University of Kamenge campus. It is in the Gihosha zone of the Ntahangwa commune, just north of the Ntahangwa River.

== Services ==
The Kamenge Military Hospital is a tertiary public hospital in the north health zone of Bujumbura Mairie Province, and served a population of 157,846 as of 2014. It is an autonomous institution under the supervision of the Ministry of National Defense and Veterans Affairs. It is a diagnostic and treatment center for both the Civil and Military population. The hospital can serve over 400 in-patients and over 500 outpatients per day. It has around 600 staff, civilian and military combined.

== History ==
The Kamenge Military Hospital opened on 6 February 1984. Since then it has expanded considerably. In 1991, the HMK was made a Personalized Administration with budgetary and management autonomy and assets. In June 2001 the head of the hospital was upgraded from Director to Director General. Around 2016 the three-story Mother-Child Building opened with over 150 beds. It had three operating rooms, rooms for pregnant women to give birth, and treatment rooms for children under 5 years old. In March 2022 two new buildings were inaugurated at the hospital, an adult emergency-resuscitation block and a billing block.

In September 2022 it was reported that the hospital was undergoing extensive renovations. The parking lot and most of the paths between buildings were paved to eliminate mud and dust, and there were chairs where patients could sit while waiting. The morgue had been expanded and had locally manufactured refrigerators. There were plans to add an imaging and surgery building. A project was underway to add water tanks and instal a borehole system, need to meet growing demand and avoid the common water supply cut-offs.

== Sources ==
- A propos Historique (in French), HMK
- Financement base sur la performance HT H.M Kamenge (in French), Ministere de la Sante Publique et de la Lutte Contre le Sida
- Niyongabo, Jean Marie Vianney (2 September 2022), L’Hôpital Militaire de Kamenge en pleine rénovation (in French)
- Un bon accueil dans un hôpital propre avec des soins de qualité (in French), FNDB, 31 March 2022
- "Way: Hopital Militaire De Kamenge (122956893)", OpenStreetMap
