= Commune of Gihanga =

Coordinates: 3.18333°S 29.2833°E

- Commune
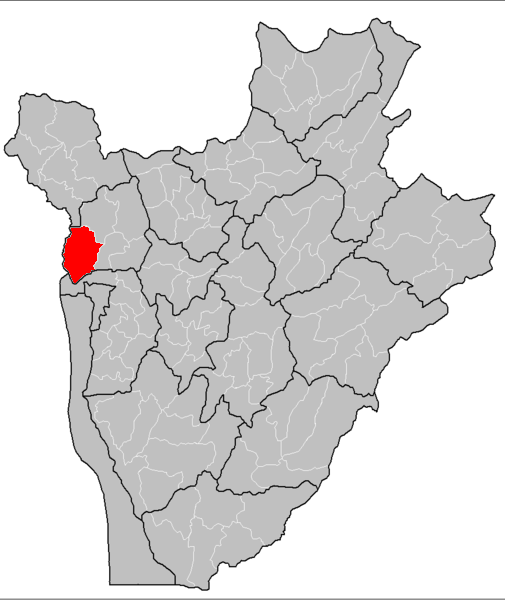
- Commune of Gihanga in Burundi
- Country: Burundi
- Province: Bubanza Province
- Administrative center: Gihanga
- Time zone: UTC+2 (Central Africa Time)

Gihanga is a commune of Bubanza Province in north-western Burundi. The capital lies at Gihanga city. The provincial capital is located in Bubanza.

== Towns and villages ==
· Gihanga (capital) · Buramata · Gihungwe · Kagwena · Mpanda · Mukindu · Murira · Muyange · Ninga · Nyeshanga · Rushakashaka
