= Karonga Museum =

Local museum in Malawi

Cultural & Museum Centre Karonga
- Karonga Museum
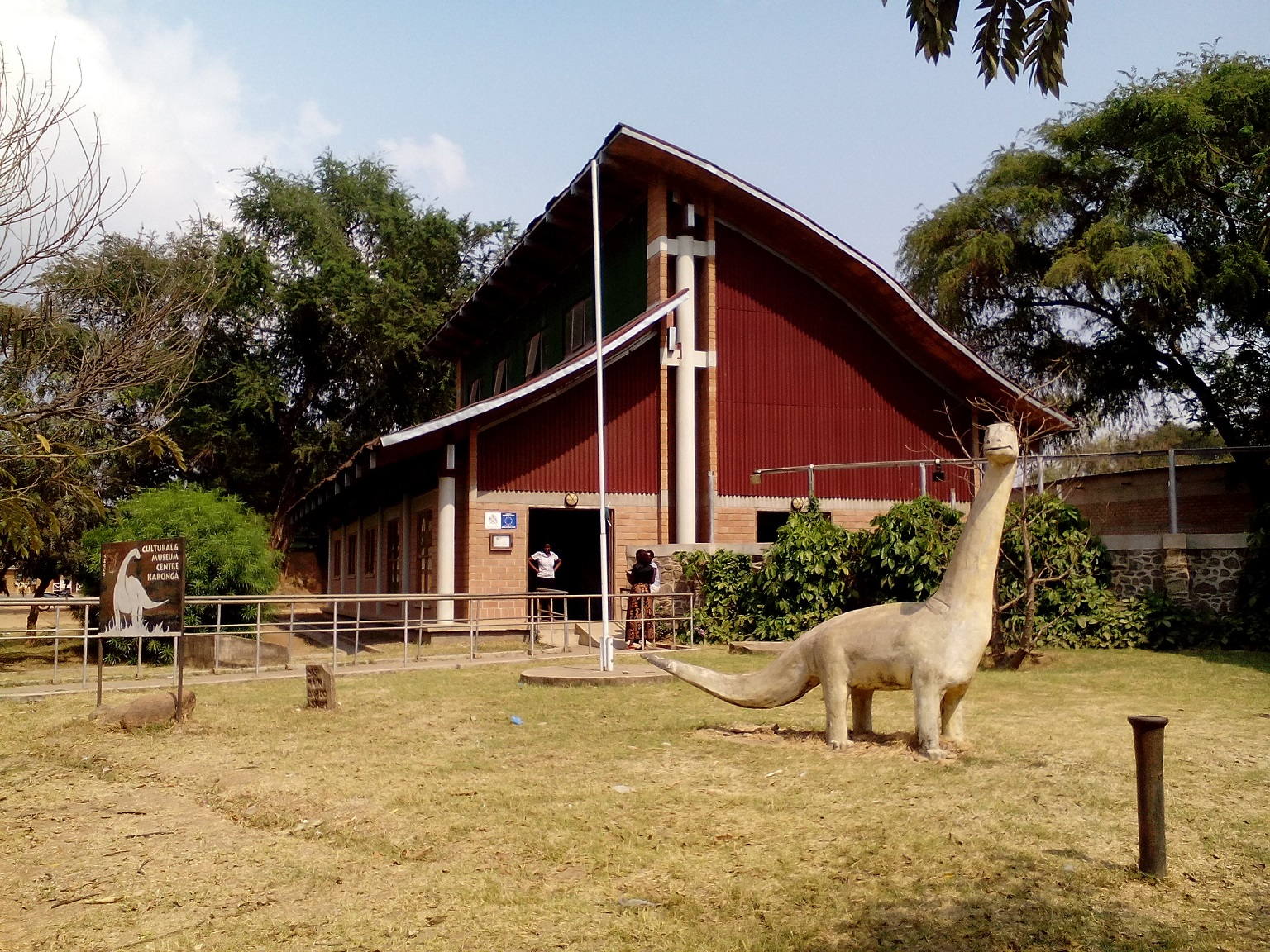
- The Cultural and Museum Centre in Karonga District, Malawi
- Coordinates: 9.9419°S 33.9222°E
- Website: warmheartofmalawi.org

The Cultural & Museum Centre Karonga (CMCK), commonly called Karonga Museum, is a cultural centre and museum in Karonga District, northern Malawi.

== Background ==
The Karonga Museum was officially opened by then President Bingu wa Mutharika in November 2004

The centre's mission is to preserve and promote Karonga's natural and cultural heritage. The fossil discoveries of dinosaurs and early humans and prehistoric remains displayed at the museum provide insights into human origins and the history of life on earth.

== Collections ==
The collection, preservation and display of the artefacts is undertaken by the Department of Antiquities, under the Department of Culture, in the Ministry of Information, Tourism, and Culture in conjunction with the Uraha Foundation. The emphasis of the Cultural Exhibition component is on community participation, local traditional and community leaders were urged to assist in assembling the different collections for exhibition.

The museum has a central exhibition which is dominated by the 130-million-year-old fossil of the Malawisaurus, which was discovered 45 km south from the centre site.

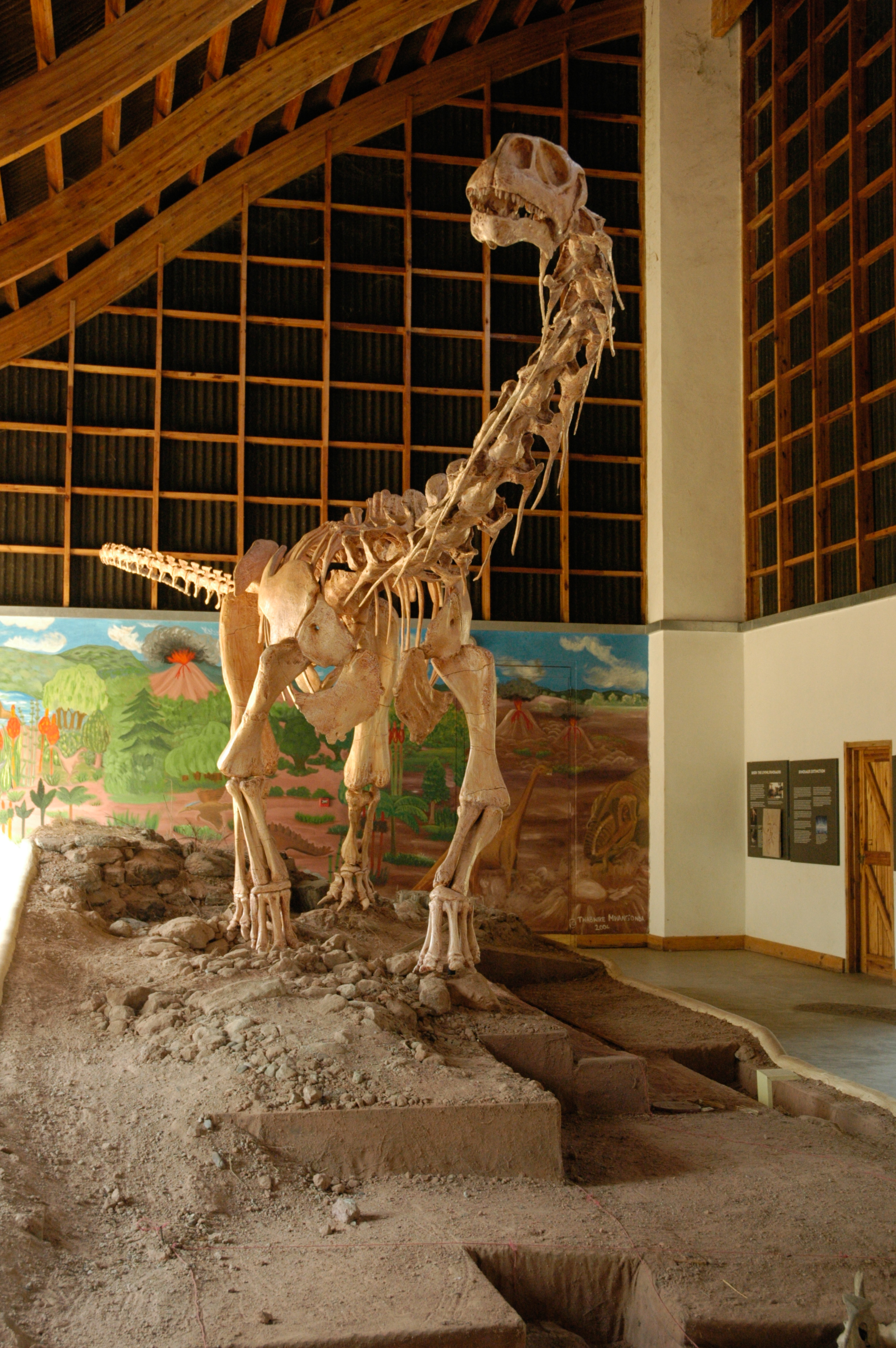
Malawisaurus (Malawi lizard) on display at the Cultural Museum Centre Karonga

== Outreach ==
The centre has a cultural activity area which provides a meeting place for the people of Karonga and their visitors. Still under construction, the building is a site for all sorts of cultural events such as drama, dance performances, music and choir events.

Its display & panorama area features 240 million years of Karonga history - from dinosaurs to democracy, including prehistoric landscapes, animals & early humans and their way of life, archaeological records, history of slave trade, colonial times, Malawi under Dr. Banda, culture and traditions of Karonga people.

== Programmes ==
The Center for Field Research participates in international projects. The Karonga Cultural & Museum Center has improved awareness of Malawi's Cultural & Natural heritage by educational development and research.

== The buildings ==
The building that houses the Cultural Centre and the museum was constructed in 2004 for K30 million (US$276,000) was inspired by the excavated bones of the Malawisaurus that is the feature at the museum. During 2014, weather damage threatened the collection of fossils and other artefacts held at the centre. An appeal for K30million (US$) was made in order to repair the Onduline roof.

The building was designed by British architect Kevin M. Davies, and it is one of his highlighted projects.
