= Bubanza Hospital =

Geography
- Location: Bubanza, Bubanza Province, Burundi
- Coordinates: 3.08445°S 29.39544°E

Organisation
- Care system: Public

Links
- Lists: Hospitals in Burundi

The Bubanza Diocesan Hospital (French: Hôpital de Bubanza) is a hospital in Bubanza Province, Burundi. It is in the Roman Catholic Diocese of Bubanza.

== Location ==
The Bubanza Hospital is a faith-based hospital in the city of Bubanza, at the center of the Bubanza Health District. It is in the center of the town, southeast of the Cathédrale Christ Roi de Bubanza. It is on the south side of the RN 9 highway, which runs north from Bujumbura and turns east just before it passes the hospital. It is an approved district hospital serving a population of 210,361 as of 2014.

== Services ==
The hospital has a capacity of about 160 beds. Facilities include two operating rooms, a gynaecology room with neonatology, a radiology room, a center that distributes oxygen to operating theatres and wards, a laboratory and a pharmacy. A physiotherapeutic rehabilitation centre opened in 2016. A workshop began building and maintaining prostheses and orthoses in September 2019.

== History ==
The Diocesan Hospital of Bubanza was built by Swiss volunteers at the end of the 1970s. It was fully operational until the start of the Burundi Civil War. The hospital re-opened in 2000 and resumed regular operations.

In 2002 the British charity Children's Aid Direct defined a program to improve health and nutrition in Bubanza Province. This included repairing the tuberculosis ward at Bubanza Hospital.

== Sources ==
- Carte Sanitaire du Burundi (PDF), Burundi Ministry of Public Health, 2016
- Children's Aid Direct new contract for Burundi, 8 June 2001
- Financement base sur la performance HD Bubanza (in French), Ministere de la Sante Publique et de la Lutte Contre le Sida
- "Hôpital De Bubanza", Google Maps
- Our projects, Andare Oltre Foundation
