= Gahombo Hospital =

Geography
- Location: Kayanza Province, Burundi
- Coordinates: 2.97015°S 29.73262°E

Organisation
- Care system: Public

Links
- Lists: Hospitals in Burundi

The Gahombo Hospital (French: Hôpital Gahombo) is a hospital in Kayanza Province, Burundi.

== Location ==
The Gahombo Hospital is just east of the junction where the RP51 road running east from Kayanza joins RP52, which runs north to join the RN6 highway just west of Rukeco.

The Gahombo Hospital is the district hospital for the Gahombo Health District, which serves the southeast of Kayanza Province. It is a public hospital serving a population of 193,950 as of 2014. The only other hospital in the province is the Kayanza Hospital, serving the Kayanza Health District.

== History ==
In May 2017 Edouard Nduwimana, Ombudsman of Burundi, offifically presented the hospital a donation of medical equipment that had been collected by the Burundian community in Denmark and managed by the MIDA association. On 3 October 2018 Edouard Nduwimana again visited Gahombo to distribute a donation from Burundians living in Denmark. The hospital received a modern anesthesia machine.

== Sources ==
- Carte Sanitaire du Burundi (PDF), Burundi Ministry of Public Health, 2016
- Financement base sur la performance HD Gahombo (in French), Ministere de la Sante Publique et de la Lutte Contre le Sida
- "La Communauté Burundaise de Danemark équipe l'Hôpital de Gahombo à Kayanza", Burundi Forum (in French), 15 November 2017
- Nininahazwe, Gaudiose (4 November 2018), Association Copidan/Don: l’hôpital de district de Gahombo reçoit un appareil de grande importance (in French)
- "Way: Gahombo (786232225)", OpenStreetMap
