= Cankuzo Hospital =

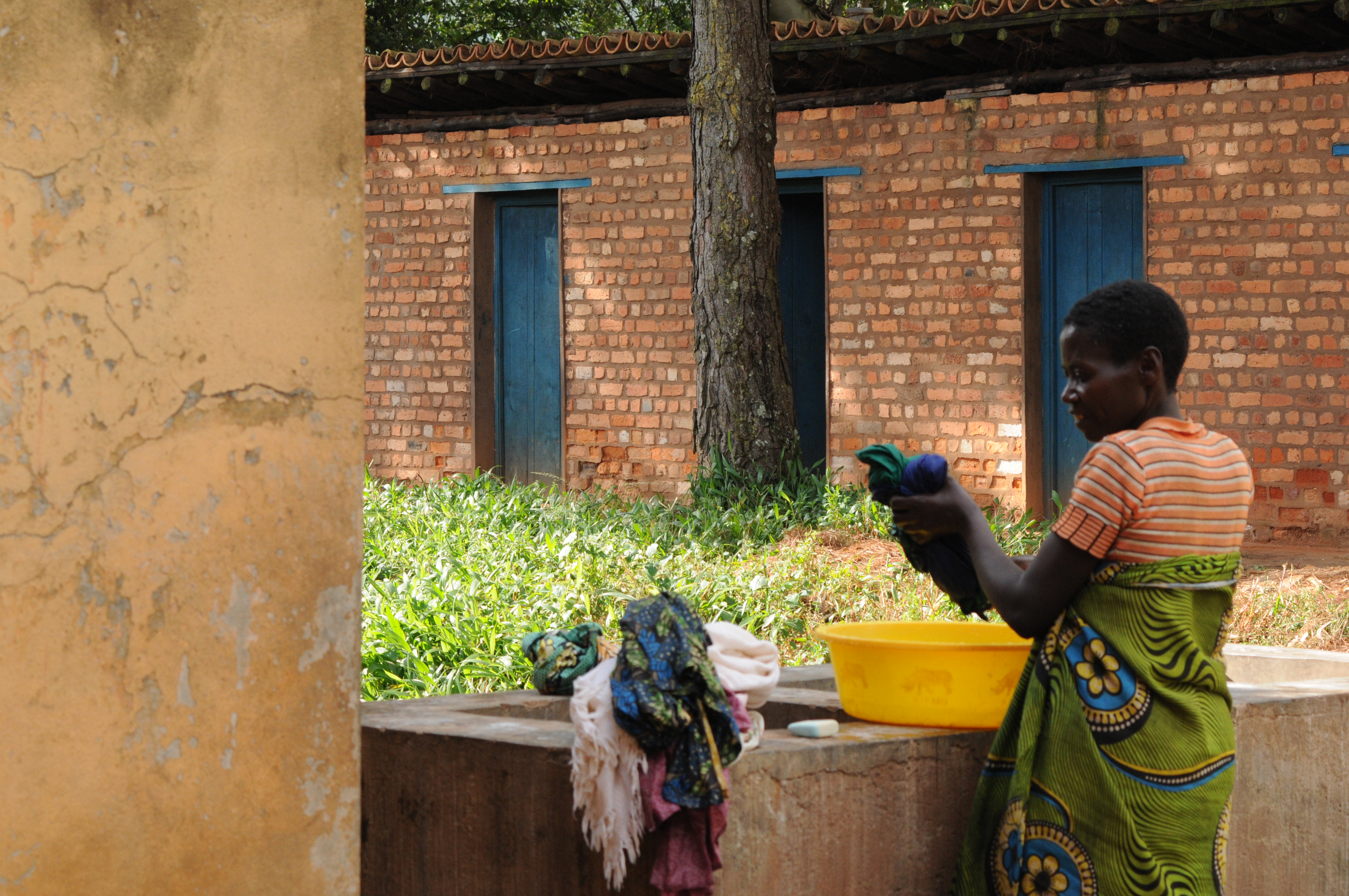
- Washing activities in the hospital of Cankuzo (in the background the hospital's toilets)

Geography
- Location: Cankuzo, Cankuzo Province, Burundi
- Coordinates: 3.21985°S 30.55277°E

Organisation
- Care system: Public

Links
- Lists: Hospitals in Burundi

The Cankuzo Hospital (French: Hôpital de Cankuzo) is a hospital in Cankuzo Province, Burundi.

== Location ==
The Cankuzo Hospital is a hospital in the city of Cankuzo, in the center of the Cankuzo Health District. It is the only hospital in the district. It is a public district hospital serving a population of 279,477 as of 2014.

== Events ==
In October 2017 it was reported that the hospital did not have enough beds for patients, and some had to find accommodation in nearby households. The cause was an epidemic of malaria in the province. Only seriously ill patients were admitted, and they had to pay high prices for a room. There was also a lack of specialty medicines at the hospital.

On 16 December 2020 the Minister of Health, Thaddée Ndikumana, gave maternity and neonatal equipment worth $36,000 to Cankuzo Hospital and Murore Hospital during the launch of Mother Child Health Week.

In October 2022 it was reported that there was a shortage of doctors in the Cankuzo Health District. There was one government doctor at Cankuzo Hospital, and three doctors under contract who could leave at any time, which had happened in the past.

== Sources ==
- "Cankuzo : L'hôpital déborde de malades", Radio Publique Africaine (in French), 4 March 2017
- Carte Sanitaire du Burundi (PDF), Burundi Ministry of Public Health, 2016
- Financement base sur la performance HD Cankuzo (in French), Ministere de la Sante Publique et de la Lutte Contre le Sida
- "L'hôpital Cankuzo fait face au manque de médecin", Agence Burundaise de Presse (in French), 20 October 2022
- Nahimana, Pascal (22 December 2020), "Réception d'équipements médicaux aux hôpitaux de CANKUZO et MURORE", Burundi Forum (in French)
