= Ngozi Hospital =

Autonomous Hospital of Ngozi (HAN)

Geography
- Location: Ngozi Province, Burundi
- Coordinates: 2.9077°S 29.8225°E

Organisation
- Care system: Public

Links
- Lists: Hospitals in Burundi

The Autonomous Hospital of Ngozi (French: ️Hôpital Autonome de Ngozi, HAN) is a referral hospital in Ngozi, Ngozi Province, Burundi.

== Location ==
The Ngozi Hospital is near the center of the town of Ngozi, on the west side of the RN15 highway, to the north of its intersection with the RN6 highway. It is southeast of the Cathédrale Coeur Immaculé de Marie. It is one of two hospitals in the Ngozi Health District, the other being the faith-based Mivo Hospital. It is a public regional hospital, with a target population of 154,122 as of 2014.

== Services ==
Emergency services are provided 24 hours per day, seven days per week. Normal weekday hours of operation are 7:30-12:00 in the morning and 2:00-5:30 in the afternoon. Services include emergency services, radiology, surgery, internal medicine, pediatrics (general pediatrics, neonatology and nutritional supplementation service), laboratory, physiotherapy, maternity (gynecology-obstetrics), stock pharmacy and medical dispensing pharmacy, administrative service, outpatient consultation, stomatology, intensive care, ophthalmology and HIV/AIDS care.

== History ==
The Autonomous Hospital of Ngozi was built in 1930. It is a reference hospital for the northern region of Burundi. Since 2000 it has had autonomous management as a personalized institution of the State. In 2013 it was reported that there was a shortage of beds, with some spending the night outside despite the cold. There was also a severe shortage of nursing staff. A new maternity ward was inaugurated in September 2017. In 2019 it was reported that nurses were sleeping outdoors, on the ground or on cardboard boxes, for lack of a proper shalter.

== Sources ==
- Carte Sanitaire du Burundi (PDF), Burundi Ministry of Public Health, 2016
- Financement base sur la performance HR Ngozi (in French), Ministere de la Sante Publique et de la Lutte Contre le Sida
- "Hôpital de Ngozi : les malades en mal de lits", Iwacu, 5 May 2013
- "L' Hôpital De Ngozi", Google Maps
- Nkunzimana, Prosper (2017), Le respect du secret professionnel chez le personnel infirmier (thesis)
- Vianney Mico, Jean Marie (22 November 2019), "Hôpital de Ngozi : les garde-malades souffrent autant que les malades", Yaga Burundi
