= Bubanza =

- City
- Location in Burundi
- Coordinates: 3°05′S 29°24′E
- Country: Burundi
- Province: Bubanza Province
- Commune: Commune of Bubanza

Population (2018)
  - Total: 20,031

Bubanza is a city located in northwestern Burundi. It is the capital city of Bubanza Province. It is also the seat of the Commune of Bubanza. Notable personalities from this province include Manasse Nzobonimpa, the province's first post-war governor, Gabriel Ntisezerana, former second Vice-president of the Republic and Pascal Nyabenda, former president of the Burundi National Assembly.

The city is home to the Bubanza Diocesan Hospital, built by Swiss volunteers in the late 1970s. The hospital has a capacity of about 160 beds.

== Sources ==
- Our projects, Andare Oltre Foundation
