= Gitega Regional Hospital =

Geography
- Location: Gitega Province, Burundi
- Coordinates: 3.42141°S 29.93398°E

Organisation
- Care system: Public

Links
- Website: www.hopital-gitega.bi
- Lists: Hospitals in Burundi

The Gitega Regional Hospital (French: Hôpital Régional de Gitega, HRG) is a hospital in Gitega Province, Burundi.

== Location ==
The Gitega Regional Hospital is in the city of Gitega, at the center of the Gitega Health District. The only other hospital in this district is the faith-based Kibimba Hospital in the extreme northeast. It is a public hospital serving a population of 62,014 as of 2014.

== Services ==
Departments include Emergencies, Medical informatics, Stomatology, Ophthalmology, Ear, nose and throat, Medical imaging, Resuscitation, Obstetric gynecology, Surgery, Pediatrics, Obstetric fistula care, HIV-positive support, Logistics, Internal medicine, Therapeutic stabilization, Neonatology, Laboratory and Maternity.

== History ==
The Gitega Hospital was founded in 1922 by the Belgian colonial administration, the first hospital in Burundi. In 1992 it acquired the status of Regional Hospital.

As of 2017 all the equipment and infrastructure were very dated, but it was gradually improving through low-cost changes. UNICEF had funded rehabilitation and extension of the pediatric service, which was at an advanced stage. The hopital had 8 Burundian doctors and 7 Chinese specialists.

In May 2021 the Director of Kira Hospital, Christophe Sahabo, visited the Gitega Regional Hospital with a team of nurses from Kira Hospital. They brought supplies such as masks, soap and disinfectants that could be used in the fight against COVID-19. They discussed joint projects, including setting up an intensive care unit at Gitega Hospital, sponsored by Kira Hospital, and training staff who would work there.

On 10 January 2022 Doctor Sylvie Nzeyimana, Minister of Public Health and the Fight against AIDS, opened the jubilee year of the Gitega Regional Hospital. The ceremony included laying the first stone of the Kira Muvyeyi Mother-Child block, which was expected to be completed within 15 months. At this time the hospital had 321 beds, with a staff of 318. The hospital director noted that the premises were dilapidated, the service areas cramped and there was a lack of specialist doctors. However, the emergency and intensive care departments were being rehabilitated, specialist doctors recruited and a hemodialysis machine was being installerd.

== Sources ==
- "Actualités à la une... Actuellement les demandeurs de services à l'hôpital Régionale de Gitega se disent satisfaits de la manière dont ils sont accueillis et traités.", Province de Gitega (in French)
- Carte Sanitaire du Burundi (PDF), Burundi Ministry of Public Health, 2016
- Financement base sur la performance HR Gitega (in French), Ministere de la Sante Publique et de la Lutte Contre le Sida
- Hakizimana, Placide (15 May 2021), "Vers un partenariat de collaboration entre l'hôpital Kira et l'hôpital régional de Gitega", Radio Télévision Nationale du Burundi (in French)
- Hakizimana, Placide (10 January 2022), "Hôpital régional de Gitega: lancement de l'année jubilaire de cent ans (1922-2022)", Radio Télévision Nationale du Burundi (in French)
- Hôpital Regional de Gitega au Service de la Nation Depuis 1922 (in French), Gitega Regional Hospital
- HRG Nos Services (in French), Gitega Regional Hospital
