= Natwe Turashoboye Hospital =

Geography
- Location: Karusi, Karusi Province, Burundi
- Coordinates: 3.104°S 30.1572°E

Organisation
- Care system: Public

Links
- Website: hopitalkarusi.bi
- Lists: Hospitals in Burundi

The Natwe Turashoboye Hospital or Fiftieth Anniversary Hospital (Note: The formal name in French is Hôpital du Cinquantenaire : Natwe Turashoboye. Cinquantenaire is French for "Fiftieth anniversary". The hospital was founded in 2012, the 50th anniversary of Burundi independence. Natwe Turashoboye is Kirundi for "We can too", a term used for empowerment of the disadvantaged. The full name could be translated as "Fiftieth anniversary We can too hospital")) is a hospital in Karusi Province, Burundi.

== Location ==
The Natwe Turashoboye Hospital is a hospital in the city of Karusi, in the south of the Buhiga Health District. It is one of two hospitals in the district, the other being the Buhiga Hospital. It is a tertiary public hospital serving a population of 251,592 as of 2014. It is a national hospital that serves as a precision diagnostic center using medical imaging devices and modern analysis laboratories.

== Events ==
The Karusi Fiftieth Anniversary Hospital began providing services to the population of Karusi and the country in general in 2014.

In June 2020 Pierre Nkurunziza, outgoing President of Burundi, died at the hospital following a cardiac arrest. He had been due to hand over to Evariste Ndayishimiye in August 2020.

In August 2020 it was reported that the medical scanner at the hospital had been out of order for six months. Technicians from Uganda could repair it, but had been unable to travel due to Covid restrictions. The scanner is a key machine in attracting patients from across Burundi and from neighboring countries such as Tanzania and the Democratic Republic of the Congo.

On 27 November 2020 Imelde Sabushimike, Minister of National Solidarity, visited the hospital with care packages for the sick.

On 18 November 2021 Prosper Bazombanza, Vice-President of Burundi, and Thaddée Ndikumana, Minister of Public Health, officially inaugurated the Physiotherapy department at the hospital.

== Sources ==
- Bariko, Isney (10 August 2020), "Le scanner en panne à l'hôpital de référence de Karusi", Isanganiro
- Carte Sanitaire du Burundi (PDF), Burundi Ministry of Public Health, 2016
- Chahed, Nadia (9 June 2020), "Burundi: Death of President Pierre Nkurunziza", Anadolu Agency (AA)
- Financement base sur la performance HT Natwe Turashoboye (in French), Ministere de la Sante Publique et de la Lutte Contre le Sida
- Hakizimana, Placide (18 November 2021), L'Hôpital du cinquantenaire de Karusi ouvre le service de kinésithérapie (in French), Radio Télévision Nationale du Burundi
- Nyandwi, Dieudonné (25 June 2024), "La Première Dame du Burundi vole au secours des patients de l'hôpital de Karusi", Radio Télévision Nationale du Burundi (in French)
- Qui sommes nous (in French), Hôpital Natwe Turashoboye
- "Visite de l'hôpital du cinquantenaire NATWE TURASHOBOYE à KARUSI", AGnews, 27 November 2020
