= Kira Hospital =

Hospital in Bujumbura

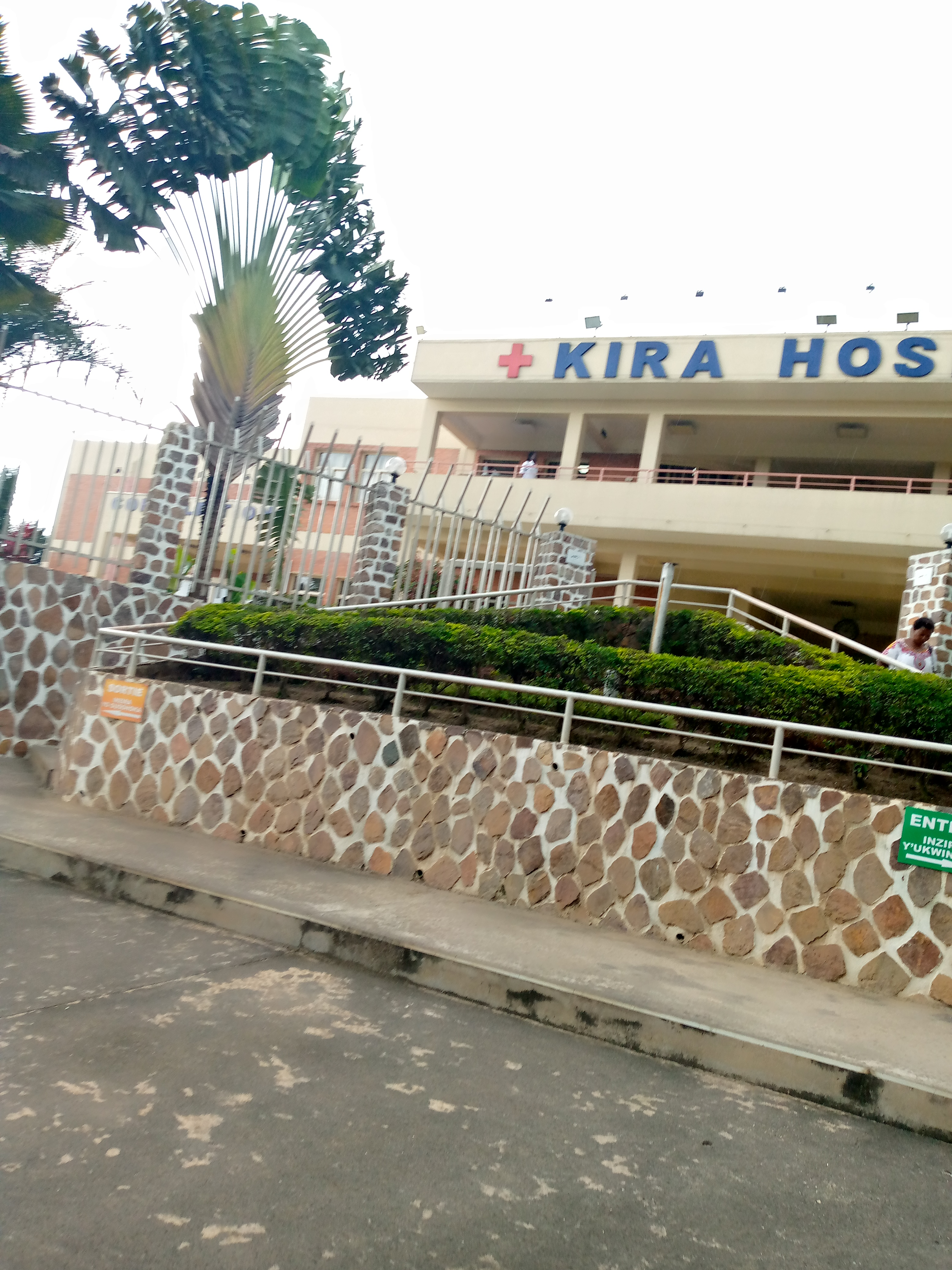
- Kira Hoispital in 2022

Geography
- Location: Bujumbura, Bujumbura Mairie Province, Burundi
- Coordinates: 3.3995°S 29.3593°E

Organisation
- Care system: Public

Links
- Website: kirahospital.org
- Lists: Hospitals in Burundi

Kira Hospital (French: Hôpital Kira) is a private hospital located in Bujumbura, Burundi. The hospital was funded by Swiss investors, a local insurance company and local individuals, and opened in 2015 to provide specialist services that had not been available in Burundi. In 2022 the hospital was taken over by a group associated with the government, and services rapidly declined. Aid from the primary European donor was cut off in May 2024 due to concerns over potentially illegal activity.

== Location ==
The Kira Hospital is in the Kinindo commune, in the south of Bujumbura. It is south of the Muha River, on the west side of the Boulevard de la Liberte, and the north side of the Avenue Nzero, facing the Embassy of Egypt on the south side. In the Kirundi language, Gukira means "to heal".

== Facilities ==
The Kira Hospital is a three-story building, and covers an area of 10,000 square metres (110,000 sq ft). It has 130 beds and 150 employees. It offers 14 functional services including imaging, mammography, dental radio and hard drugs detoxification. Departments include cardiology, radiology (medical imaging), cancerology, coeliosurgery, anatomopathology, neurosurgery, allergology, visceral and orthopedic surgery.

== Concept and construction ==
Planning for building a modern, well-equipped hospital in Bujumbura began in 2011. Doctor Christophe Sahabo, a Geneva-trained ophthalmologist, talked with other doctors about the idea of a large new hospital that could offer specialist services. Staffing was to include 11 full-time and 10 part-time specialist doctors, of whom more than half would be Burundians who had been trained in Europe. Prices would be slightly lower than those of specialists elsewhere in the city.

The group of doctors obtained support from Suiss Made International and Lamelec, two Swiss companies that provided 40% and 20% respectively of the capital, and the Burundian insurance company Socabu with another 20%. Private individuals and doctors would hold the remaining 20%. The goal was to give Burundians an alternative to seeking costly treatment abroad. The hospital would provide specialized medical services that until then had not been available in Burundi, including cardiovascular surgery and treatment of cancer, at an affordable cost.

The Minister of Public Works, Saidi Kibeya, laid the foundation stone on 29 June 2011. Construction was undertaken from March 2013 to April 2013. The hospital opened to patients in April 2015. The hospital had two floors and 120 beds. It was planned to add a third floor and double the number of beds within three years.

== Early history (2015–2022) ==
In June 2016 a Swiss delegation met Joseph Butore, Second Vice President of Burundi. They had come to officially relaunch their activities at Kira Hospital. On 7 November 2016 Dr. Josiane Nijimbere, Minister of Public Health, visited the hospital. At that time the hospital was one of the best in Burundi, with 143 employees including 6 general practitioners and 21 speclialist doctors. In April 2017 Domitien Ndayizeye, former President of Burundi, was admitted to the hospital for treatment. In February 2018 the Director General of Burundi Health Services opened the third Medical Day organized by the Kira Hospital, which he praised for reducing the number of medical evacuations abroad by 20%.

In May 2021 the Director of Kira Hospital, Christophe Sahabo, visited Gitega Regional Hospital with a team of nurses from Kira Hospital. They brought supplies such as masks, soap and disinfectants that could be used in the fight against COVID-19. They discussed joint projects, including setting up an intensive care unit at Gitega Hospital, sponsored by Kira Hospital, and training staff who would work there. In September 2021 DEG Impulse, a German development finance institution, made a development agreement with the hospital.

== Management changes (2022–present) ==
The National Intelligence Service (Service national de renseignement, SNR) arrested Christophe Sahabo on 1 April 2022 without a warrant. The French chairman of the board of directors, Jean-David Pillot, was also arrested but was released the next day. Soon after, a short letter of resignation by Sahabo for personal reasons was circulated in Bujumbura. Social networks started to say that the Burundian government shareholders wanted Sahabo dismissed for mismanagement and fraudulent management, and wanted a "new distribution of shareholding dominated until now by foreign groups". Pillot was allowed to leave the country a few days later, after being forced to resign. No lawyer was present during Sahabo's interrogation, and after 22 days his relatives and lawyers were still unable to see him. His lawyers said he had not had access to medical care despite severe attacks of asthma.

On 25 April 2022 the Vice President of Burundi, Prosper Bazombanza, was admitted to the hospital following a stroke.

In April 2022 Charles Ndagijimana, leader of a group of parastatal shareholders, boycotted a meeting of the board of directors, accusing the general manager Doctor Christophe Sahabo of mismanagement and fraud. Ndagijimana proclaimed himself president and appointed Dr. Sylvain-Pierre Nzeyimana as the active general manager. At the end of September 2022 Sahabo was transferred to Ruyigi prison. He had not been tried as of January 2023.

On 9 January 2023 the private shareholders of Kira Hospital wrote to Évariste Ndayishimiye, President of Burundi, complaining of the "deliberate bankruptcy of the hospital". They complained of total mismanagement, payments to fictitious suppliers, overcharging for some supplies and misappropriation of funds. They noted that two scanners were broken, two out of three generators had stopped working and two thirds of the vehicles were broken down. Qualified staff had not been paid and had left the hospital. The management quickly responded by denying all charges and threatening the shareholders with legal action.

In May 2023 DEG Impulse reviewed how over 1 million euros of the first tranche of financing had been spent. They were given documents by the new management that related to equipment that had been purchased in 2015. In August 2023 Radio Publique Africaine reported that almost all the medical equipment had broken down, and only one ambulance was still running. The auditor refused to report on the shareholding structure at the general meeting that month because it did not match the balance sheets, which had to match investment.

In May 2024 DEG Impulse terminated its agreement after the new management of the hospital failed to provide documents required before a second tranche of aid worth 1.6 million euros could be released. The documents related to finances, management and ownership.

== Sources ==
- A Propos (in French), Kira Hospital
- Burundi: Kira Hospital, voie du salut pour des milliers de malades africains (in French), Agence Anadolu (Turkey), 15 April 2015
- "Burundi: le directeur du Kira Hospital arrêté par le Service national de renseignement", RFI (in French), France Médias Monde, 3 April 2022
- "Burundi : Le KIRA HOSPITAL, un des meilleurs hôpitaux burundais", AGnews (in French), 8 November 2016
- "DEG Impulse résilie son contrat avec KIRA Hospital pour manquements graves", Radio Publique Africaine (in French), 4 June 2024
- "Descente aux enfers de l'hôpital KIRA SWISS CLINIC", Radio Publique Africaine (in French), 31 August 2023
- Hakizimana, Placide (15 May 2021), "Vers un partenariat de collaboration entre l'hôpital Kira et l'hôpital régional de Gitega", Radio Télévision Nationale du Burundi (in French)
- Hicintuka, Jean-Marie (21 February 2018), "L'hôpital Kira a réduit à 80 % les transferts vers l'étranger", ABP (in French)
- Irambona, Gisèle (29 June 2016), "Des coopérants suisses reviennent au pays pour l'Hopital Kira", Radio Télévision Nationale du Burundi (in French)
- Jérôme (25 April 2022), "Burundi : Le Vice Président Prosper Bazombaza admis à Kira Hospital", Itara (in French)
- "Kira Hospital", EA Health
- Leclercq, Hubert (13 January 2023), "Burundi : La guerre de tranchées autour du Kira hospital se poursuit", La Libre Afrique (in French)
- "Le pouvoir burundais détient le docteur Sahabo et contrôle le Kira Hospital-Swiss Clinic", RFI (in French), 23 April 2022
- Nikiza, Egide (10 April 2017), "Kira hospital : «L'évolution de la santé de l'ex-président est bonne»", Iwacu (in French)
- Urakeza, Cédric-Soledad (11 July 2011), "Kira Hospital : tout soigner au Burundi", Iwacu (in French)
- "Way: Kira Hospital (995561196)", OpenStreetMap
