= Kibuye Hope Hospital =

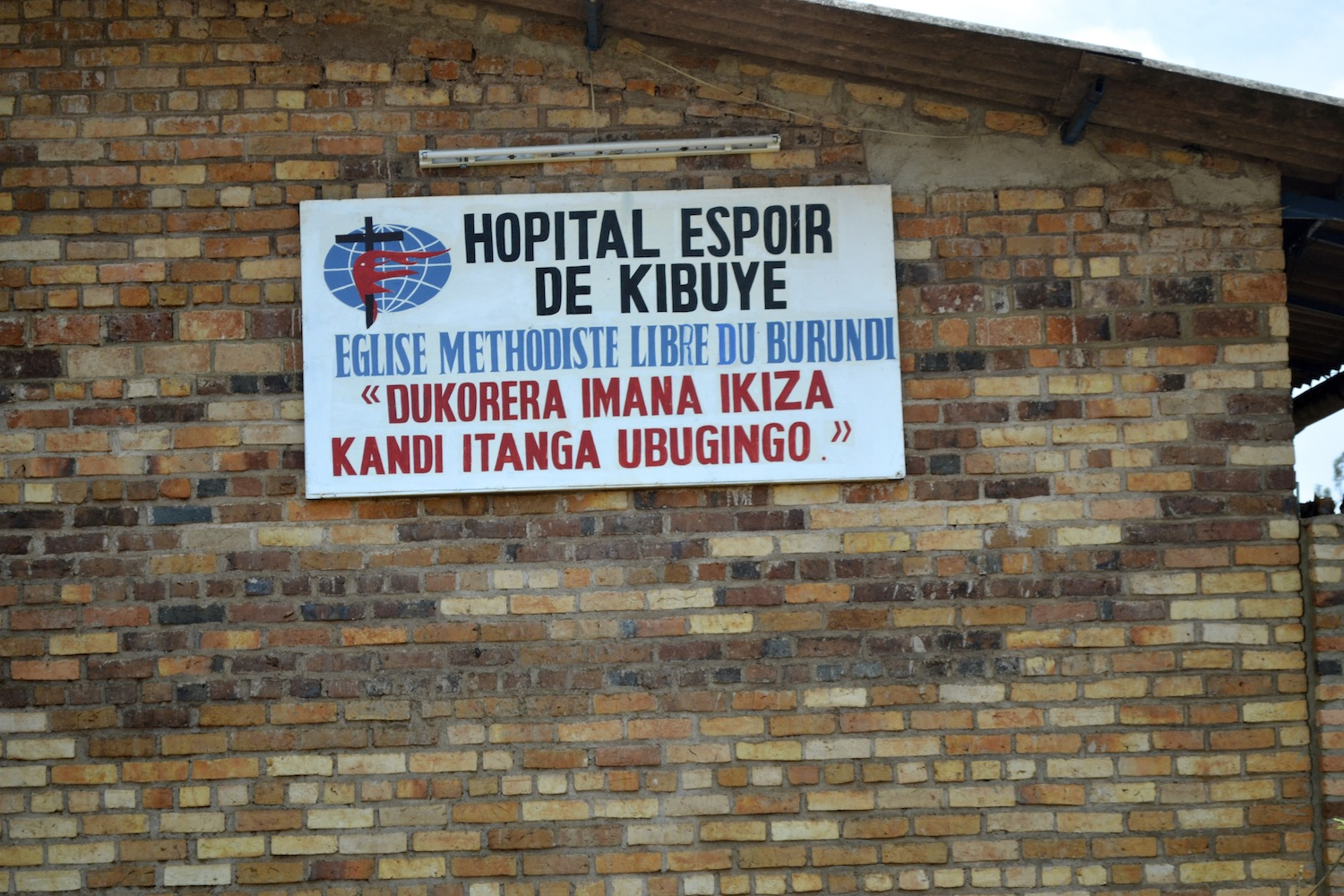

Geography
- Location: Kibuye, Gitega Province, Burundi
- Coordinates: 3.6643°S 29.97963°E

Organisation
- Care system: Public

Links
- Website: www.kibuyehopehospital.org
- Lists: Hospitals in Burundi

The Kibuye Hope Hospital (French: Hôpital Espoir de Kibuye, HEK) is a hospital in Gitega Province, Burundi.

== Location ==
Kibuye Hope Hospital is a faith-based hospital in the city of Kibuye, in the center of the Kibuye Health District. It is the only hospital in the district. It is in the Kibuye colline, Commune of Bukirasazi, Gitega Province. It is in the Kirimiro natural region in the central plateaus of Burundi.

== Services ==
Kibuye Hope Hospital is a private district hospital that served a target population of 62,014 as of 2009. Services include radiology, laboratory, internal medicine, emergency, ophthalmology, pediatrics, pharmacy, community medicine, clinical psychology, support, physiotherapy and surgery.

== History ==
The Kibuye Hope Hospital was founded by Free Methodist missionaries from the United States of America in 1946. In 2006 it was one of the hospitals chosen for a pilot Results-Based Financing program. This program, together with free care, removed budgetary contraints and resulted in a massive increase in patients, particularly maternity cases.

In 2010 the hospital became a university hospital, mainly training health professionals from the Hope University of Africa (Université Espoir d’Afrique), also operated by the Free Methodist Church in Burundi. Training programs include surgery and family medicine.

In February 2020 a group of armed men broke into the nursing staff house at the hospital and apparently stole some money. One of them, said to have been identified as a police officer, lost his life. Staff would not provide details.

As of 2024 the hospital had 230 employees, with over 30 doctors and more than 60 nurses. It continues to be operated by the Free Methodist Church in Burundi, since 2010 as part of the Hope University.

== See also ==
List of hospitals in Burundi

== Sources ==
- À propos de nous (in French), Kibuye Hope Hospital
- Carte Sanitaire du Burundi (PDF), Burundi Ministry of Public Health, 2016
- Financement base sur la performance HD Kibuye (in French), Ministere de la Sante Publique et de la Lutte Contre le Sida
- "Hopital Kibuye, dix ans de mise en œuvre du fbp : quels succes, quels defis ?" (PDF), Bulletin trimestriel sur le financement base sur la performance (FBP) (in French), Ministere de la sante publique et de la lutte contre le sida
- Manirakiza, Jean Noël (28 February 2020), "Gitega/ Hôpital Espoir de Kibuye : mystère autour du cambriolage", Iwacu (in French)
- Nos Service (in French), Kibuye Hope Hospital
