= Commune of Mpanda =

Coordinates: 03°012′S 29°024′E

- Commune
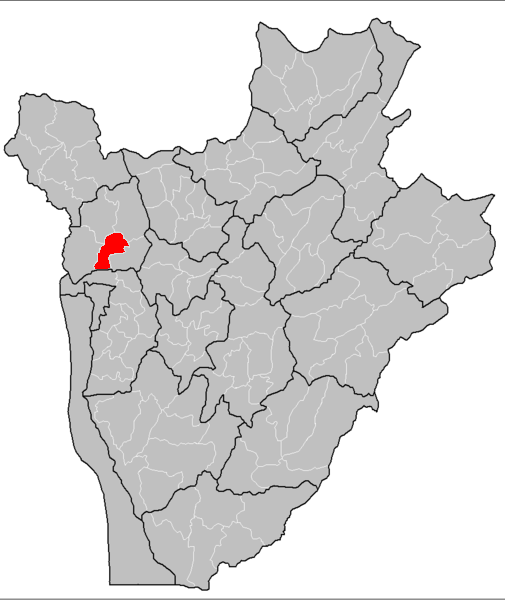
- Commune of Mpanda in Burundi
- Country: Burundi
- Province: Bubanza Province
- Administrative center: Mpanda
- Time zone: UTC+2 (Central Africa Time)

Mpanda is a commune of Bubanza Province in north-western Burundi. The capital lies at Mpanda city.
