= Subdivisions of Burundi =

Territorial subdivisions of Burundi

Burundi is a unitary state which is sub-divided at three levels: provinces, communes, and collines (hills).

== Divisions ==
=== Provinces ===
The largest administrative division in Burundi is the province or intara. Until 2025, there were 18 provinces in Burundi, each named after their provincial capital. Each province has a Provincial Governor. The provincial organisation of Burundi has been reformed on a number of occasions. The latest reforms occurred in March 2023, which substantially reduced the number of provinces, communes and hills. The 18 provinces were combined into five new provinces: Buhumuza, Bujumbura, Burunga, Butanyerera and Gitega. These provinces were implemented at the time of the 2025 legislative elections.

The former 18 provinces were Bubanza, Bujumbura Mairie, Bujumbura Rural, Bururi, Cankuzo, Cibitoke, Gitega, Karuzi, Kayanza, Kirundo, Makamba, Muramvya, Muyinga, Mwaro, Ngozi, Rumonge, Rutana and Ruyigi.

=== Communes ===
The second-largest administrative division is the commune (municipality). There are currently 117 communes in Burundi but they will be reduced to 42 after the 2025 legislative elections

=== Collines ===
The smallest subdivision in Burundi is the colline (literally "hill") or umutumba of which there are 2,638 in the country. Similarly to the provinces and communes, the number of collines will also be change in 2025 increasing to 3,044.
