= List of Burundian provinces by area =

Current provinces of Burundi

The following table presents a listing of Burundi's 5 provinces ranked in order of their surface area.

== Current provinces ==
| Rank | Province | km² |
|---|---|---|
| 1 | Buhumuza | 5,931 |
| 2 | Bujumbura | 3,937 |
| 3 | Burunga | 6,206 |
| 4 | Butanyerera | 4,480 |
| 5 | Gitega | 4,546 |

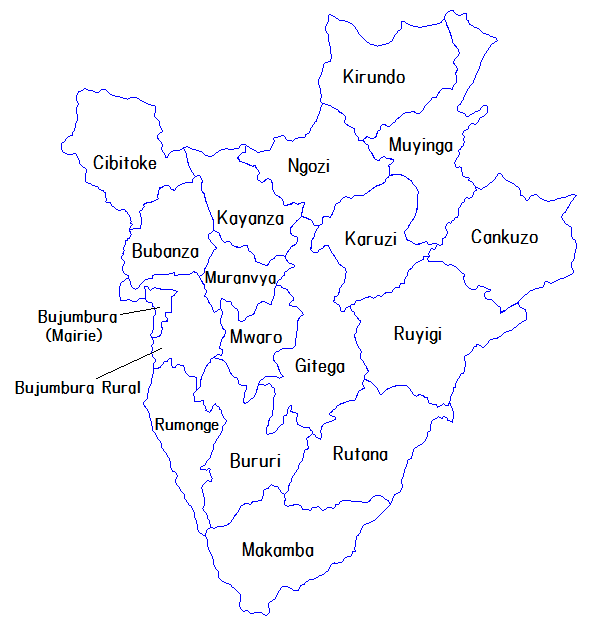
The provinces of Burundi

== Former provinces (2015-2025) ==
| Rank | Province | km² |
|---|---|---|
| 1 | Ruyigi | 2,339 |
| 2 | Gitega | 1,979 |
| 3 | Cankuzo | 1,965 |
| 4 | Makamba | 1,960 |
| 5 | Rutana | 1,959 |
| 6 | Muyinga | 1,836 |
| 7 | Kirundo | 1,703 |
| 8 | Bururi | 1,645 |
| 9 | Cibitoke | 1,636 |
| 10 | Ngozi | 1,474 |
| 11 | Karuzi | 1,457 |
| 12 | Kayanza | 1,233 |
| 13 | Bubanza | 1,089 |
| 14 | Rumonge | 1,080 |
| 15 | Bujumbura Rural | 1,060 |
| 16 | Mwaro | 840 |
| 17 | Muramvya | 696 |
| 18 | Bujumbura Mairie | 87 |

== See also ==
- Burundi
- Provinces of Burundi
- Geography of Burundi
- List of Burundian provinces by population
