= List of Burundian provinces by population =

Provinces of Burundi as of 2025.

The following table presents a listing of Burundi's 5 provinces ranked in order of the total population of their communes as recorded in the 2024 census, taking into account the reduction of Burundi provinces from 18 to 5 in 2025 after the parliamentary elections.

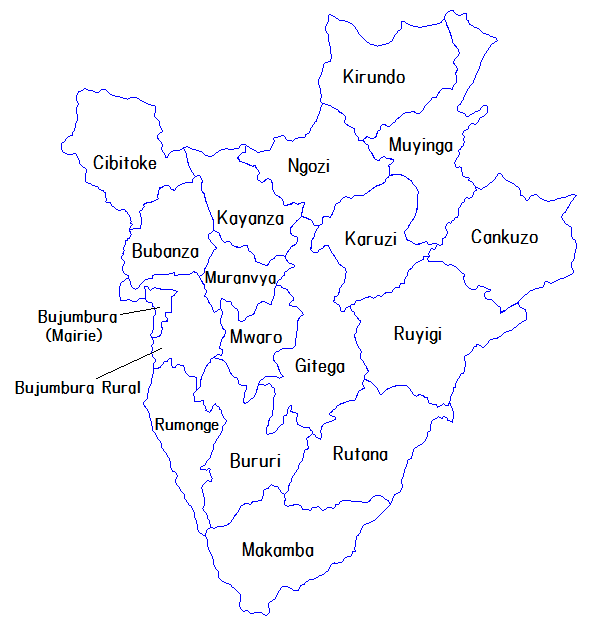
The provinces of Burundi until 2025.

== Current provinces ==
As of august 2025, Burundi has five provinces.

Rank	Province	Population (2024 census)	Density
1	Buhumuza	2.052.261	346/km²
2	Bujumbura	3.353.555	851.8/km²
3	Burunga	2.118.551	340/km²
4	Butanyerera	2.530.206	564.8/km²
5	Gitega	2.278.215	501.1/km²

== Former provinces (2015-2025) ==
Rank	Province	Population	Density
1	Gitega	1,002,223	370/km2
2	Ngozi	660,717	450/km2
3	Muyinga	632,409	340/km2
4	Kirundo	628,256	370/km2
5	Kayanza	585,412	470/km2
6	Bujumbura Mairie	497,166	5700/km2
7	Bujumbura Rural	464,818	420/km2
8	Cibitoke	460,435	280/km2
9	Karuzi	436,443	300/km2
10	Makamba	430,899	220/km2
11	Ruyigi	400,530	170/km2
12	Rumonge	352,026	330/km2
13	Bubanza	338,023	310/km2
14	Rutana	333,510	170/km2
15	Bururi	313,102	230/km2
16	Muramvya	292,589	420/km2
17	Mwaro	273,143	330/km2
18	Cankuzo	228,873	120/km2

== See also ==
- Provinces of Burundi
- Geography of Burundi
- List of Burundian provinces by area
