= List of regions of Burundi by Human Development Index =

This is a list of regions of Burundi by Human Development Index as of 2025 with data for the year 2023.

Rank	Regions	HDI (2023)
Low human development
1	West (Bubanza, Bujumbura Rural, Cibitoke, Bujumbura Mairie)	0.489
2	South (Bururi, Makamba)	0.470
3	Middle (Gitega, Karuzi, Muramvya, Mwaro)	0.441
–	Burundi (average)	0.439
4	East (Cankuzo, Rutana, Ruyigi)	0.422
5	North (Kayanza, Kirundo, Muyinga, Ngozi)	0.392
