= Binyuro =

- Village
- Location in Burundi
- Coordinates: 4°3′15″S 29°37′27″E
- Country: Burundi
- Province: Bururi Province
- Commune: Commune of Vyanda
- Time zone: UTC+2 (Central Africa Time)

Binyuro is a village in the Commune of Vyanda in Bururi Province in southern Burundi. By road it is located 21 kilometres southeast of Bururi and 12.6 kilometres northwest of Vyanda, and south of Muyuga.
