= Ruvyironza River =

River in Burundi and Tanzania

Ruvyironza River Luvironza
- Location within Burundi
- Native name: Rivière Ruvyironza (French)

Location
- Countries: Burundi, Tanzania

Physical characteristics
- Source: Mount Kikizi
  - location: Burundi
  - coordinates: 3°54′47″S 29°50′23″E
  - elevation: 2,145 m (7,037 ft)
- Mouth: Ruvuvu River
  - location: Kagera Region
  - coordinates: 3.34391°S 29.99238°E
  - elevation: 1,417 m (4,649 ft)
- Length: 182.4 km (113.3 mi)
- Basin size: 2,023.7 km^{2} (781.4 sq mi)
- Discharge
  - location: Mouth
  - average: 21.95 m^{3} (775.0 cu ft)
  - minimum: 4.58 m^{3} (161.7 cu ft)
  - maximum: 45.12 m^{3} (1,593 cu ft)

Basin features
- Progression: Ruvubu → Kagera → Lake Victoria → White Nile → Nile → Mediterranean Sea
- Population: 792,296 (2016)

The Ruvyironza (or Luvironza) River (French: rivière Ruvyironza) is a river in Burundi, the main tributary of the Ruvubu River. Its headwaters are the most remote source of the Nile when measured by river length from the Nile's mouth.

== Course ==
The Ruvyironza rises in the east of Bururi Province to the west of Mount Kikizi (2,145 metres (7,037 ft)). It forms near Kiryama and the RIG6 / RP83 junction, where its tributaries the Nyabuyugi and Kibazwa come together. It flows northwest to the border with Gitega Province. It follows part of the border between these two provinces, then flows through Gitega Province to the border with Mwaro Province, and follows the Mwaro-Gitega border north before turning east and again crossing Gitega Province to its mouth on the Ruvubu River. Most of the rivers in the Nile Basin portion of Burundi flow into the Ruvubu or its main tributary, the Ruvyironza.

== Source of the Nile ==
The Luvironza River is the source of the Nile in the sense that it is in the Nile basin, and the distance by river from its headwater to the mouth of the Nile is 6,671 kilometres (4,145 mi), longer than the distance from any other headwater. (Note: The Blue Nile contributes much more water to the Nile than the White Nile. An approach that went upstream from the mouth of the Nile, always following the branches with the greatest flow, would give a source in Ethiopia.) It is a tributary of the Ruvubu River, a tributary of the Kagera River, which flows in Lake Victoria. From there, the river takes different names as it flows north: the Victoria Nile, Albert Nile, Bahr al Jabal, White Nile and north of Khartoum the Nile.

== Environment ==
The surroundings of the upper Ruvyironza are mainly savannah. The area is quite densely populated, with 239 inhabitants per square kilometer as of 2016. The average annual temperature in the area is 20 °C (68 °F). The warmest month is September, when the average temperature is 23 °C (73 °F), and the coldest is April, with 18 °C (64 °F). Average annual rainfall is 1,137 millimetres (44.8 in). The wettest month is December, with an average of 199 millimetres (7.8 in) of precipitation, and the driest is July, with 1 millimetre (0.039 in) of precipitation.

At Nyabiraba in central Gitega Province the Ruvyironza has a 728 square kilometres (281 sq mi) drainage basin, with average flow of 10 cubic metres per second (350 cu ft/s). Annual precipitation is 1,209 millimetres (47.6 in) and average temperature is 17.8 °C (64.0 °F). The laws regarding the public hydraulic zones are not respected in any of the Ruvubu watersheds, but particularly along the Ruvyironza. This results in frequent landslides of the unprotected river banks.

== Marshes ==
The Ruvyironza basin contains 8,425 hectares (20,820 acres) of marshes, of which 7,310 hectares (18,100 acres), or 87%, were exploited for agriculture by 1998. The Ruvyironza flows along the eastern boundary of the Commune of Gishubi in Gitega, separating it from the Commune of Makebuko. The Kanyangwa River flows through Gishubi to join it from the west (left). The marshes of these two rivers are used for farming year round. The soil in this section of the river is not very fertile, and the farmers must use fertilizer.

In December 2015 torrential rains in the Commune of Mutaho, Gitega Province, devastated fields in the marshes of the Ruvubu and Ruvyironza rivers. Crops of beans, corn and sweet potatoes that had already been planted were lost. In April 2024 extensive flooding in the Ruvyironza River valley destroyed several hectares of crops in the Commune of Nyabihanga, Mwaro Province. The bridge linking the Commune of Nyabihanga to the Commune of Gitega was at risk of collapse.

== Hydroelectricity ==
The Ruvyironza power station is in Gitega Province, northeast of the city of Gitega, facing Karuzi Province over the Ruvubu River. It is fed by a canal running south from a dam on the Ruvyironza River near its mouth on the Ruvubu River. It discharges into the Ruvubu River. The Ruvyironza plant, owned by REGIDESO Burundi, was commissioned in 1980/1984. Power is supplied by three 425 KW turbines, delivering 1275 KW when all three are running, or 850 KW when just two are operational.

A 2012 report by the Ministry for Energy and Mines stated that potential developments on the Ruvyironza (Luvi 047, 039, 012) might be able to deliver 21.2MW.

== See also ==
- List of rivers of Burundi

== Sources ==
- "Centrale hydroélectrique Rushanga", OpenStreetMap
- Center For International Earth Science Information Network-CIESIN-Columbia University (2016), Gridded Population of the World, Version 4 (GPWv4): Population Count, Palisades, NY: NASA Socioeconomic Data and Applications Center (SEDAC), doi:10.7927/H4X63JVC
- "Des champs dévastés par les pluies torrentielles à Mutaho", Isanganiro (in French), 10 December 2015
- Document d'orientation strategique d'amenagement des bassins versants et de lutte antierosive (PDF) (in French), Gitega: Ministere de l’environnement, de l’agriculture et de l’elevage, March 2022
- Investment opportunities in renewable energy Burundi (PDF), Minister for Energy and Mines, October 2012
- Linke, Simon; Lehner, Bernhard; Ouellet Dallaire, Camille; Ariwi, Joseph; Grill, Günther; Anand, Mira; Beames, Penny; Burchard-Levine, Vicente; Maxwell, Sally; Moidu, Hana; Tan, Florence; Thieme, Michele (2019-12-09), "Global hydro-environmental sub-basin and river reach characteristics at high spatial resolution", Scientific Data, 6 (1), doi:10.1038/s41597-019-0300-6, ISSN 2052-4463, PMC 6901482, PMID 31819059
- NASA Earth Observations: Population Density, NASA/SEDAC, archived from the original on 9 February 2016
- NASA Earth Observations Data Set Index, NASA, archived from the original on 11 May 2020 Temperature data from satellite measurements of the earth's surface temperature within a box that is 0.1×0.1 degrees
- NASA Earth Observations: Rainfall (1 month - TRMM), NASA/Tropical Rainfall Monitoring Mission, archived from the original on 19 April 2019 Average value for the years 2012–2014 within a box that is 0.1×0.1 degrees
- NASA Earth Observations: Land Cover Classification, NASA/MODIS, archived from the original on 28 February 2016
- Ndabashinze, Rénovat (9 April 2024), "Nyabihanga : Une partie des riverains de la Ruvyironza dans la désolation totale", Iwacu (in French)
- "Nile", Encarta online encyclopedia, archived from the original on 2008-05-13
- Nsabimana, René (September 2022), Quality of service and access to electricity in Burundi and East Africa, a comparison of sector performance (PDF), University of Liège
- Ntungumburanye, Gérard; Nindamutsa, Astère (November 2018), Etude de vulnerabilite et d'adaptation aux changements climatiques (PDF) (in French), Ministère de l’Environnement, de l’Agriculture et de l’Elevage
- Presentation de la Commune Gishubi (in French), Gitaga government
- "Relation: Ruvyironza (5392957)", OpenStreetMap, 6 April 2024
- River Nile, Geocities, archived from the original on 18 January 2002
- "Ruvyironza", Energypedia
- Schema directeur d'amenagement et de mise en valeur des marais (PDF) (in French), Bujumbura: Ministère de l’Aménagement du Territoire et de l’Environnement, September 2000
- U.S. Defense Mapping Agency (1994), Bururi (PDF), University of Texas at Austin
- Vijverberg, Jacobus; Sibbing, Ferdinand A.; Dejen, Eshete (2009), "Lake Tana: Source of the Blue Nile", The Nile, Monographiae Biologicae, vol. 89, Dordrecht: Springer, pp. 163–192, doi:10.1007/978-1-4020-9726-3_9, ISBN 978-1-4020-9726-3
