= List of massacres in Burundi =

The following list is a list of massacres that have occurred in Burundi in reverse chronological order:

== List of massacres ==
Name	Date	Deaths	Involved	Location – Circumstances
2020 Bugarama attack	August 23-24, 2020	11	RED-Tabara	Bugarama, Rumonge Province
2015 Bujumbura massacre	December 12, 2015	87 (including 8 soldiers and policemen)	Burundian security forces	Bujumbura Mairie Province, Bujumbura, Nyakabiga district, Musaga, Mutakura, Nyakabiga, Ngagara, Cibitoke and Jabe – After three army installations in Ngagara, Musaga and Mujejuru were attacked, the security forces killed numerous people in predominantly Tutsi-inhabited neighborhoods.
Gatumba refugee camp massacre	August 13, 2004	160	Forces for National Liberation	Bujumbura Rural Province, Mutimbuzi commune, Gatumba
Itaba massacre	September 9, 2002	267	Burundian security forces and the National Council for the Defense of Democracy – Forces for the Defense of Democracy	Itaba
Titanic Express massacre	December 28, 2000	21	Forces for National Liberation	Bujumbura Rural – Bus attack by the Hutu-extremist group Palipehutu-FNL.
Bungendana massacre	20 July 1996	320 - 648	Hutu rebels	Bungendana, Gitega - Between 300 and 648 people of Tutsi ethnicity, mostly internally displaced persons, including women, children and the elderly, were killed by Hutu rebels
1993 ethnic violence	21 October to 31 December 1993	25,000	Hutu peasants	Nationwide
1988 Hutu massacres	1988	5,000 to 25,000	Hutu peasants	Nationwide
Ikiza	April–August 1972	210,000	Tutsi-Hima dictatorship	Nationwide
1969				
1965				

== Gallery ==
Location of Burundi

Map of Burundi

== See also ==
- Burundian Civil War
- Truth and Reconciliation Commission (Burundi)
- Burundian unrest (2015–2018)
