= Buhumuza =

Province of Burundi

- Province
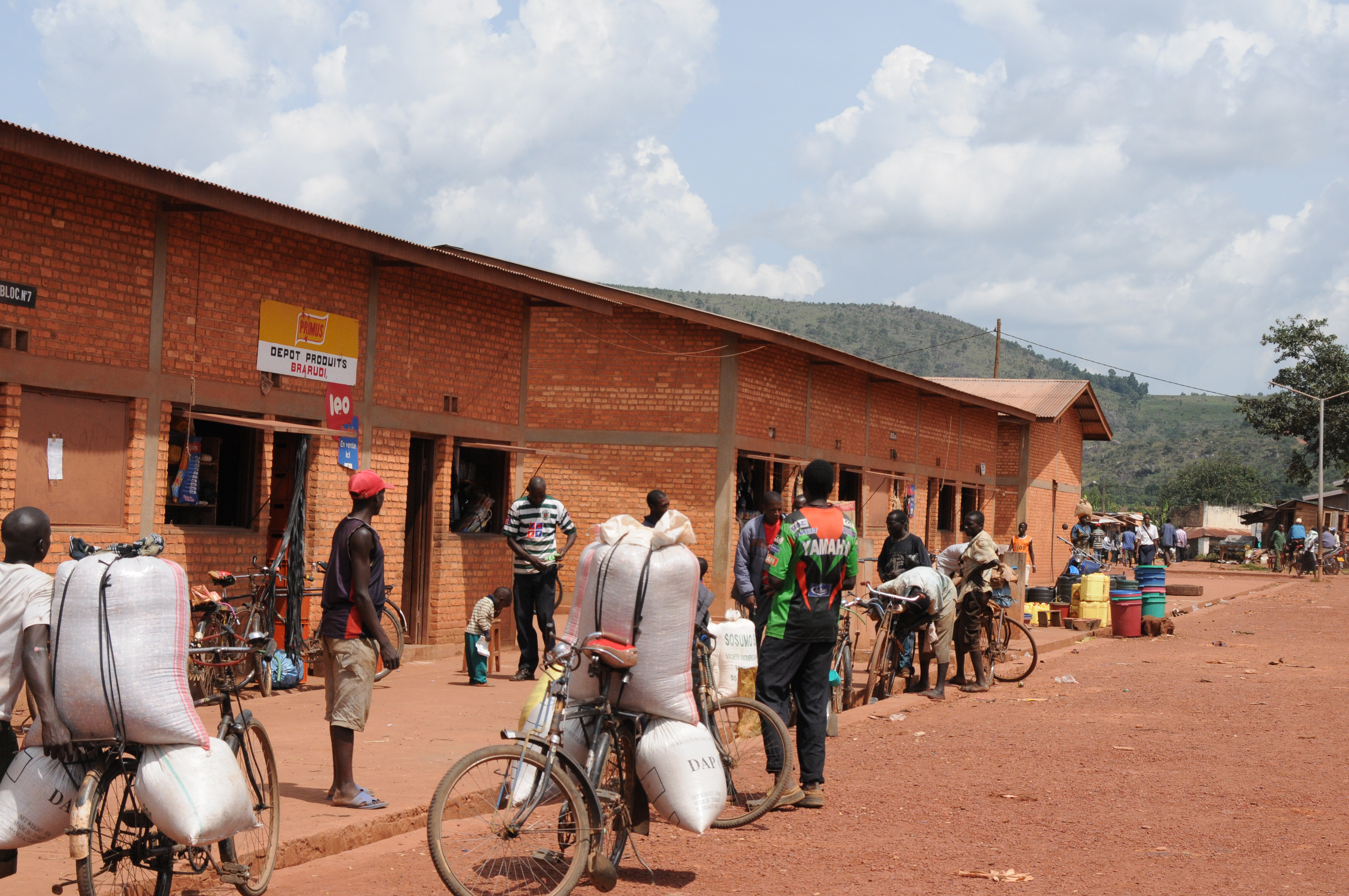
- Market in Cankuzo, the capital of Buhumuza

- Location of Buhumuza in Burundi
- Coordinates: 3°S 30.5°E
- Country: Burundi
- Inaugurated: 2025
- Capital: Cankuzo

Government
  - Governor: Dénise Ndaruhekeye (CNDD-FDD)

Area
  - Total: 5,931 km^{2} (2,290 sq mi)

Population (2024 census)
  - Total: 2,052,261
  - Density: 346.0/km^{2} (896.2/sq mi)
- Time zone: UTC+2 (CAT)
- Website: https://www.provincebuhumuza.gov.bi/

Buhumuza is the least populous of Burundi's five provinces. It covers an area of 5,931 square kilometres (2,290 sq mi) and recorded a population of 2,052,261 in the 2024 Burundian census. The province's capital is Cankuzo, while Muyinga is its largest town, reporting a population of 9,609 in the 2008 Burundian census.

== Geography ==
Located in eastern Burundi, Buhumuza borders the Burundian provinces of Burunga, Gitega and Butanyerera to the southwest, west and northwest respectively, Rwanda's Eastern Province to the north, and Tanzania's Kagera Region and Kigoma Region to the northeast and southeast respectively. Buhumuza's topography is characterized by a series of alternating lowlands and highlands: from north to south, these are the Bugesera Depression, Bweru plateau, the Ruvubu River valley, the Buyogoma plateau, and the Moso lowlands.

Ruvubu National Park, Burundi's largest national park, protects the Ruvubu river valley which crosses the province from southwest to northeast. Gisagara Protected Landscape is located in the eastern part of the province near the Tanzanian border.

== History ==
On 16 March 2023, President of Burundi Évariste Ndayishimiye signed into law a reorganization of Burundi's administrative divisions, which included the reduction of Burundi's provinces from eighteen to five. Buhumuza was created from the former provinces of Cankuzo, Muyinga and Ruyigi. The new provinces took effect with Burundi's 2025 parliamentary and local elections. Buhumuza's first governor Dénise Ndaruhekeye was sworn in on 4 July 2025.

Buhumuza is an old place name in eastern Burundi. During the colonial era it was the name of a chiefdom in the territory of Ruyigi.

== Communes ==
Buhumuza is divided into seven communes: Butaganzwa, Butihinda, Cankuzo, Gisagara, Gisuru, Muyinga, and Ruyigi.

== Infrastructure ==
Paved roads connect the towns of Cankuzo, Muyinga and Ruyigi. A 220 kV overhead power line extends 160 kilometres (99 mi) from Rusumo Hydroelectric Power Station on Kagera River on the Rwanda–Tanzania border to Muyinga and onwards to Gitega.
