= Kiremba =

- Town
- Location in Burundi
- Coordinates: 3°56′35″S 29°40′30″E
- Country: Burundi
- Province: Bururi Province
- Commune: Commune of Bururi

Government
  - Administrator: Cyriaque Nkezabahizi

Area
  - Total: 243.43 km^{2} (93.99 sq mi)

Population
  - Total: 95.854
  - Density: 394/km^{2} (1,020/sq mi)
- Time zone: UTC+2 (Central Africa Time)

Kiremba is a small town in the Commune of Bururi in Bururi Province in southern Burundi. By road it is located 7 kilometres southeast of Bururi and 4.3 kilometres northwest of Buta. On April 30, 1997, the same day as the massacre at nearby Buta, the FDD killed Hutu and two Tutsi people in Kiremba, burning the local hospital and raping two women before killing them. In 2004, the people were tested for epilepsy. Kiremba has a Swedish Protestant School, although it is said to be more Anglican in its teachings.
