= Gahama =

- Village
- Location in Burundi
- Coordinates: 4°0′58″S 29°39′46″E
- Country: Burundi
- Province: Bururi Province
- Commune: Commune of Bururi
- Time zone: UTC+2 (Central Africa Time)

Gahama is a village in the Commune of Bururi in Bururi Province in southern Burundi. It is located southeast of Bururi and its western side is framed by a forest.
