= Gasanda =

- Village
- Location in Burundi
- Coordinates: 3°57′18″S 29°33′59″E
- Country: Burundi
- Province: Bururi Province
- Commune: Commune of Bururi
- Time zone: UTC+2 (Central Africa Time)

Gasanda is a village in the Commune of Bururi in Bururi Province in southern Burundi. It is located southwest of Bururi and the Bururi Forest Reserve is in the area.
