= Murehe =

- Village
- Location in Burundi
- Coordinates: 4°1′40″S 29°42′41″E
- Country: Burundi
- Province: Bururi Province
- Commune: Commune of Bururi
- Time zone: UTC+2 (Central Africa Time)

Murehe is a village in the Commune of Bururi in Bururi Province in southern Burundi. By road it is located 21.1 kilometres southeast of Bururi. Missionaries have been present in Murehe but the village is said to have "suffered" a shortage of them. During the genocide, the Minister of the Interior met at the dispensary in Murehe in a meeting on August 7, 1996.
