= Rwankona =

- Village
- Location in Burundi
- Coordinates: 3°57′36″S 29°40′40″E
- Country: Burundi
- Province: Bururi Province
- Commune: Commune of Bururi
- Time zone: UTC+2 (Central Africa Time)

Rwankona is a village in the Commune of Bururi in Bururi Province in southern Burundi. It is located just to the northwest of Buta.
