= Rwibaga =

- Village
- Location within Burundi
- Coordinates: 3.46797°S 29.54625°E
- Country: Burundi
- Province: Bujumbura Rural Province
- Commune: Mugongo-Manga Commune
- Time zone: UTC+2 (Central Africa Time)

Rwibaga is a village in Bujumbura Rural Province in Burundi.

Rwibaga is a colline in the Mugongo-Manga Commune, in the east of Bujumbura Rural Province. It is on the RP43 highway, east of Ijenda. It contains the Rwibaga Hospital. The Rwibaga Hospital is the center of the Rwibaga Health District. It is near the faith-based Ijenda Hospital, the other hospital in the district. It is a public district hospital serving a population of 50,855 as of 2014.

The village contains a market, the Marché de Rwibaga. In October 2021 the law on permanent stabling came into effect, which caused a sharp drop in quantity of livestock for sale at the market. The market is the primary source of funds for the commune of Mugongo-Manga.

== Sources ==
- "Burundi / Bujumbura Rural / Mugongomanga", GADM
- Carte Sanitaire du Burundi (PDF), Burundi Ministry of Public Health, 2016
- Financement base sur la performance HD Ijenda (in French), Ministere de la Sante Publique et de la Lutte Contre le Sida
- Maniragaba, Mélance (15 October 2021), "Rwibaga : Les prix du bétail en baisse", BurundiEco (in French)
- "Node: Rwibaga (3342266566)", OpenStreetMap
