= Muyuga =

- Village
- Location in Burundi
- Coordinates: 4°0′0″S 29°36′37″E
- Country: Burundi
- Province: Bururi Province
- Commune: Commune of Bururi
- Time zone: UTC+2 (Central Africa Time)

Muyuga is a village in the Commune of Bururi in Bururi Province in southern Burundi. By road it is located 6.6 kilometres southeast of Bururi.
