= Vyanda =

- Town
- Location in Burundi
- Coordinates: 4°6′14″S 29°36′29″E
- Country: Burundi
- Province: Bururi Province
- Commune: Commune of Vyanda
- Time zone: UTC+2 (Central Africa Time)

Vyanda is a town and seat of the Commune of Vyanda in Bururi Province in southern Burundi. It has a population of 29,685 and by road it is located 34.9 kilometres southeast of Bururi and 13.2 kilometres northeast of Kigwena.

== Overview ==
On 29 April 1972, a massacre took place here.

To the south is the 40 square kilometre Vyanda Forest Nature Reserve, noted for its miombo woodland habitat, Zambezian flora and Chimpanzees.
