= Commune of Bururi =

- Commune
- Location within Burundi
- Coordinates: 3°56′19″S 29°36′37″E
- Country: Burundi
- Province: Bururi Province
- Administrative center: Bururi

Area
  - Total: 391.55 km^{2} (151.18 sq mi)
- Elevation: 1,864 m (6,115 ft)

Population (2008 census)
  - Total: 83,614
  - Density: 213.55/km^{2} (553.08/sq mi)
- Time zone: UTC+2 (Central Africa Time)

The commune of Bururi is a commune of Bururi Province in south-western Burundi. The capital lies at Bururi. In 2007, DGHER electrified one rural village in the commune.

== Geography ==
=== Settlements ===
- Bururi
- Buta
- Gahama
- Gasanda
- Gatanga
- Gikokoma
- Gisarenda
- Kabogora
- Kagomogomo
- Kajabure
- Kamvumvu
- Karimbi
- Kibango
- Kiganda
- Kimongozi
- Kinama
- Kirabuke
- Kiremba
- Kivuruga
- Mahando
- Miremera
- Mpinga
- Mudaraza
- Munini
- Munyegeri
- Murehe
- Murinda
- Musagara
- Musorora
- Muyuga
- Muzura
- Nanira
- Ndagano
- Ndava
- Nyakarambo
- Nyange
- Rudegwe
- Rurembera
- Rushiha
- Rwankona
- Shembe
- Showe
- Taba
- Tarire
