= Rushubi =

- Town
- Location within Burundi
- Coordinates: 3.345547°S 29.483617°E
- Country: Burundi
- Province: Bujumbura Rural Province
- Time zone: UTC+2 (Central Africa Time)

Rushubi is a town in Bujumbura Rural Province in Burundi.

Rushubi is a colline in the Commune of Isale, in the northeast of Bujumbura Rural Province. It is at the junction of the RP119 and RP121 highways. It contains the Rushubi Hospital, in the Isale Health District. This is a public district hospital serving a population of 24,819 in 2014.

== Sources ==
- "Burundi / Bujumbura Rural / Isale", GADM
- Carte Sanitaire du Burundi (PDF), Burundi Ministry of Public Health, 2016
- Financement base sur la performance HD Rushubi (in French), Ministere de la Sante Publique et de la Lutte Contre le Sida
- "Way: hopital de Rushubi (790434417)", OpenStreetMap
