= Commune of Bugendana =

Coordinates: 3°15′20″S 29°54′19″E

- Commune
- Interactive map of Commune of Bugendana
- Country: Burundi
- Province: Gitega Province
- Administrative center: Bugendana
- Time zone: UTC+2 (Central Africa Time)

The commune of Bugendana is a commune of Gitega Province in central Burundi. The capital lies at Bugendana. In 2007, DGHER electrified two rural villages in the commune.
