= Bujumbura Province =

Province of Burundi

Coordinates: 3°23′S 29°22′E

Bujumbura is a province of Burundi. It was one of Burundi's nine original provinces when the country became independent in 1962. Sometime around 1969, the arrondissement of Mwisare was transferred from the province of Bubanza to Bujumbura. In 1991, Bujumbura was split into two provinces: Bujumbura Mairie, which contains the country's largest city, former capital, and current economic capital Bujumbura; and Bujumbura Rural. In 2015, the communes of Bugarama and Muhuta in Bujumbura Rural Province were incorporated into the newly formed Rumonge Province.

Following an administrative reform in 2023, the number of provinces in Burundi was reduced from eighteen to five. This change took effect after the legislative election of 2025, with Bujumbura Province being formed from the merger of the provinces of Bubanza, Bujumbura Mairie, Bujumbura Rural, Cibitoke, as well as the communes of Bugarama and Muhuta from Rumonge Province, and parts of the commune of Muramvya in the province of Muramvya, namely the zone of Ryarusera and the collines of Kirama, Kavya and Gatebe in the zone of Bugarama. The province's governor as of 2025 is Aloys Ndayikengurukiye.
