= Itaba massacre =

The Itaba massacre was, according to Amnesty International, the "massacre of between 173 and 267 unarmed civilians, many of them women, children and the elderly, who were deliberately and unlawfully killed in the Commune of Itaba, Gitega Province, Burundi on 9 September 2002". The killings were carried out by members of the armed forces of Burundi.

The Burundian authorities blamed the deaths on cross fire between government forces and the National Council for the Defense of Democracy – Forces for the Defense of Democracy (CNDD-FDD). Human rights groups such as Amnesty International have stated that civilians were deliberately targeted.

In 2002, the European Union called for an independent inquiry into the killings after criticising the judicial proceedings of a military court which found two officers guilty of failing to obey orders. They were sentenced to four months in prison, and released, having already served that time since their arrest.

== See also ==
- List of massacres in Burundi
