= Buta, Burundi =

Buta
- Town
- Location in Burundi
- Coordinates: 3°57′20″S 29°42′20″E
- Country: Burundi
- Province: Bururi Province
- Commune: Commune of Bururi
- Time zone: UTC+2 (Central Africa Time)

Buta is a small town in the Commune of Bururi in Bururi Province in southern Burundi. It is located 106 km by road southeast of Bujumbura and 11.3 km by R.N.16 and R.N.17 southeast of Bururi. A ten-minute drive from Bururi. Kruger writes wrongly that Buta is an important garrison town. During the civil war, there were a few kids in national service who were stationed there, to offer some protection to the seminary. On April 30, 1997, 44 Hutu and Tutsi seminarians were slaughtered at the minor seminary in Buta, most of whom were "Catholics of African origin: 8 from Rwanda, 6 from Congo, and 1 from Nigeria as well as the 4 from Burundi.".
