= Ijenda =

- Village
- Location within Burundi
- Coordinates: 3.4812271°S 29.5669027°E
- Country: Burundi
- Province: Bujumbura Rural Province
- Commune: Mugongo-Manga Commune
- Time zone: UTC+2 (Central Africa Time)

Ijenda is a village in Bujumbura Rural Province in Burundi.

Ijenda is a colline in the Mugongo-Manga Commune, in the east of Bujumbura Rural Province. It is on the RN7 highway, east of Rwibaga. It contains the faith-based Ijenda Hospital, in the Rwibaga Health District. It is near the Rwibaga Hospital, the other hospital in the district. The Ijenda Hospital is an approved district hospital serving a population of 50,855 as of 2014.

== Sources ==
- "Burundi / Bujumbura Rural / Mugongomanga", GADM
- Carte Sanitaire du Burundi (PDF), Burundi Ministry of Public Health, 2016
- Financement base sur la performance HD Ijenda (in French), Ministere de la Sante Publique et de la Lutte Contre le Sida
- "Node: Ijenda (1343414246)", OpenStreetMap
