= Commune of Muhanga =

Coordinates: 3°01′24″S 29°49′59″E

- Commune
- Interactive map of Commune of Muhanga
- Country: Burundi
- Province: Kayanza Province
- Administrative center: Muhanga
- Time zone: UTC+2 (Central Africa Time)

The commune of Muhanga is a commune of Kayanza Province in northern Burundi. The capital lies at Kibimba. In 2007, DGHER electrified one rural village in the commune.
