= Commune of Gihogazi =

- Commune
- Location in Burundi
- Coordinates: 3°07′30″S 29°58′30″E
- Country: Burundi
- Province: Karuzi Province
- Administrative center: Gihogazi

Area
  - Total: 74.3 sq mi (192.4 km^{2})

Population (2008)
  - Total: 67,627
  - Density: 910/sq mi (351/km^{2})
- Time zone: UTC+2 (Central Africa Time)

The commune of Gihogazi is a rural commune of Karuzi Province in central Burundi. The capital is Gihogazi. According to the 2008 census, Gihogazi had a total population of 67,627, of which 48% was male, and a population density of 351 people per km^{2}. The total area of the commune amounts to 192.4 km^{2} (74 sq mi).

It consists of the following 21 collines:

- Bihembe
- Bikingi
- Gasenyi
- Gasivya
- Gihogazi
- Kibezi
- Kivoga
- Kizingoma
- Mugero
- Mugogo
- Munanira
- Murago
- Mushikanwa
- Muzenga
- Nyamiyaga
- Ramba
- Ruganira
- Rusamaza
- Rutegama
- Ruyaga
- Taba
