= Butihinda =

Coordinates: 2°43′04.8″S 30°19′06.8″E

- Location in Burundi
- Country: Burundi
- Province: Muyinga Province

Butihinda is a town located in northern Burundi. It is the capital city of Commune of Butihinda in Muyinga Province in north-eastern Burundi.
