= Commune of Rango =

Coordinates: 3°06′22″S 29°45′04″E

- Commune
- Interactive map of Commune of Rango
- Country: Burundi
- Province: Kayanza Province
- Administrative center: Rango
- Time zone: UTC+2 (Central Africa Time)

The commune of Rango is a commune of Kayanza Province in northern Burundi. The capital lies at Rango.
