= Commune of Mwakiro =

Coordinates: 3°06′09″S 30°21′26″E

- Commune
- Interactive map of Commune of Mwakiro
- Country: Burundi
- Province: Muyinga Province
- Administrative center: Mwakiro
- Time zone: UTC+2 (Central Africa Time)

The commune of Mwakiro is a commune of Muyinga Province in northeastern Burundi. The capital lies at Mwakiro.
