= Commune of Mishiha =

Coordinates: 3°00′58″S 30°47′53″E

- Commune
- Interactive map of Commune of Mishiha
- Country: Burundi
- Province: Cankuzo Province
- Administrative center: Mishiha

Population
  - Total: 75,000
- Time zone: UTC+2 (Central Africa Time)

The commune of Mishiha is a commune of Cankuzo Province in north-eastern Burundi. The capital is in Mishiha.
