= Commune of Gitega =

- Commune
- Location within Burundi
- Coordinates: 3°25′35″S 29°50′37″E
- Country: Burundi
- Province: Gitega Province
- Administrative center: Gitega

Area
  - Total: 315.44 km^{2} (121.79 sq mi)
- Elevation: 1,658 m (5,440 ft)

Population (2008 census)
  - Total: 51,139
  - Density: 162.12/km^{2} (419.89/sq mi)
- Time zone: UTC+2 (Central Africa Time)

The commune of Gitega is a commune of Gitega Province in central Burundi. The capital lies at Gitega. In 2007, DGHER electrified one rural village in the commune.
