= Commune of Buraza =

Coordinates: 3°45′08″S 29°53′50″E

- Commune
- Interactive map of Commune of Buraza
- Country: Burundi
- Province: Gitega Province
- Administrative center: Buraza
- Time zone: UTC+2 (Central Africa Time)

The commune of Buraza is a commune of Gitega Province in central Burundi. The capital lies at Buraza.
