= Gisuru =

- Location in Burundi
- Coordinates: 3°27′S 30°31′E
- Country: Burundi

Gisuru is a city in eastern Burundi. It is located close to the border with Tanzania, to the northeast of Kinyinya and southwest of Cankuzo. It is the capital of the Commune of Gisuru.
