= Commune of Rumonge =

Coordinates: 3°58′S 29°26′E

- Commune
- Interactive map of Commune of Rumonge
- Country: Burundi
- Province: Rumonge Province
- Administrative center: Rumonge

Area
  - Total: 324.88 km^{2} (125.44 sq mi)

Population (2008 census)
  - Total: 145,074
- Time zone: UTC+2 (Central Africa Time)

Rumonge is a commune of Rumonge Province in southwestern Burundi. Its headquarters are at Rumonge, which is also the provincial capital. In 2007, DGHER electrified three rural villages in the commune.
