= 2020 Bugarama attack =

Part of the RED-Tabara insurgency

- Part of RED-Tabara insurgency
Date	August 23–24, 2020
Location	Bugarama, Rumonge Province, Burundi
Result	Indecisive

Belligerents
Burundi	RED-Tabara

Casualties and losses
Unknown	5 killed
- 11 civilians kidnapped and killed

Between August 23 and 24, 2020, militants from RED-Tabara attacked the city of Bugarama, Burundi, killing eleven civilians and five militants.

== Background ==
RED-Tabara was formed as a Tutsi group against the administration of Évariste Ndayishimiye and Pierre Nkurunziza. Following Nkurunziza's death a month after the 2020 Burundian general election, Ndayishimiye succeeded him and took office in July 2020. RED-Tabara decried the elections, and stated they would continue to oppose Ndayishimiye. In late August, the first repatriation of Burundian refugees from Rwanda began. The Burundian government had accused Rwanda of holding the refugees hostage and preventing their repatriation in July and August.

== Attack ==
The attack began on August 23, when RED-Tabara militants emerged from the forest around Bugarama and kidnapped eleven people. The commander of the militants later stated that they infiltrated Burundi from the DRC's South Kivu province through Lake Tanganyika. The eleven hostages were summarily executed, and then clashes broke out between the militants and the Burundian Army in the city. Five militants were killed in the battle, and eventually retreated. A senior Burundian government official stated that the attack likely stemmed from the repatriation of the refugees. RED-Tabara claimed responsibility for the attack on August 24, after clashes had died down earlier that day, and claimed that nine policemen and twenty "militants" had been killed. In the statement, RED-Tabara claimed that Hutu rebel group FDLR had infiltrated Burundian forces.

== Aftermath ==
RED-Tabara claimed several more attacks in Burundi on September 15, 18, and 25, claiming the deaths of fifty-nine people who they alleged were associated with the Burundian government. Several RED-Tabara militants, including the commander of the Bugarama attack, were arrested in Rwanda on September 29. They claimed that the Bugarama attack was against Burundian forces and Imbonerakure.
