= Commune of Bukirasazi =

Coordinates: 3°42′15″S 29°58′00″E

- Commune
- Interactive map of Commune of Bukirasazi
- Country: Burundi
- Province: Gitega Province
- Administrative center: Bukirasazi
- Time zone: UTC+2 (Central Africa Time)

The commune of Bukirasazi is a southern commune of Gitega Province in central Burundi. The capital lies at Bukirasazi.
