= Commune of Butezi =

Coordinates: 3°18′23″S 30°12′51″E

- Commune
- Interactive map of Commune of Butezi
- Country: Burundi
- Province: Ruyigi Province
- Administrative center: Butezi
- Time zone: UTC+2 (Central Africa Time)

The commune of Butezi is a commune of Ruyigi Province in eastern Burundi. The capital lies at Butezi.
