= Commune of Gasorwe =

Coordinates: 2°53′32″S 30°13′02″E

- Commune
- Interactive map of Commune of Gasorwe
- Country: Burundi
- Province: Muyinga Province
- Administrative center: Gasorwe
- Time zone: UTC+2 (Central Africa Time)

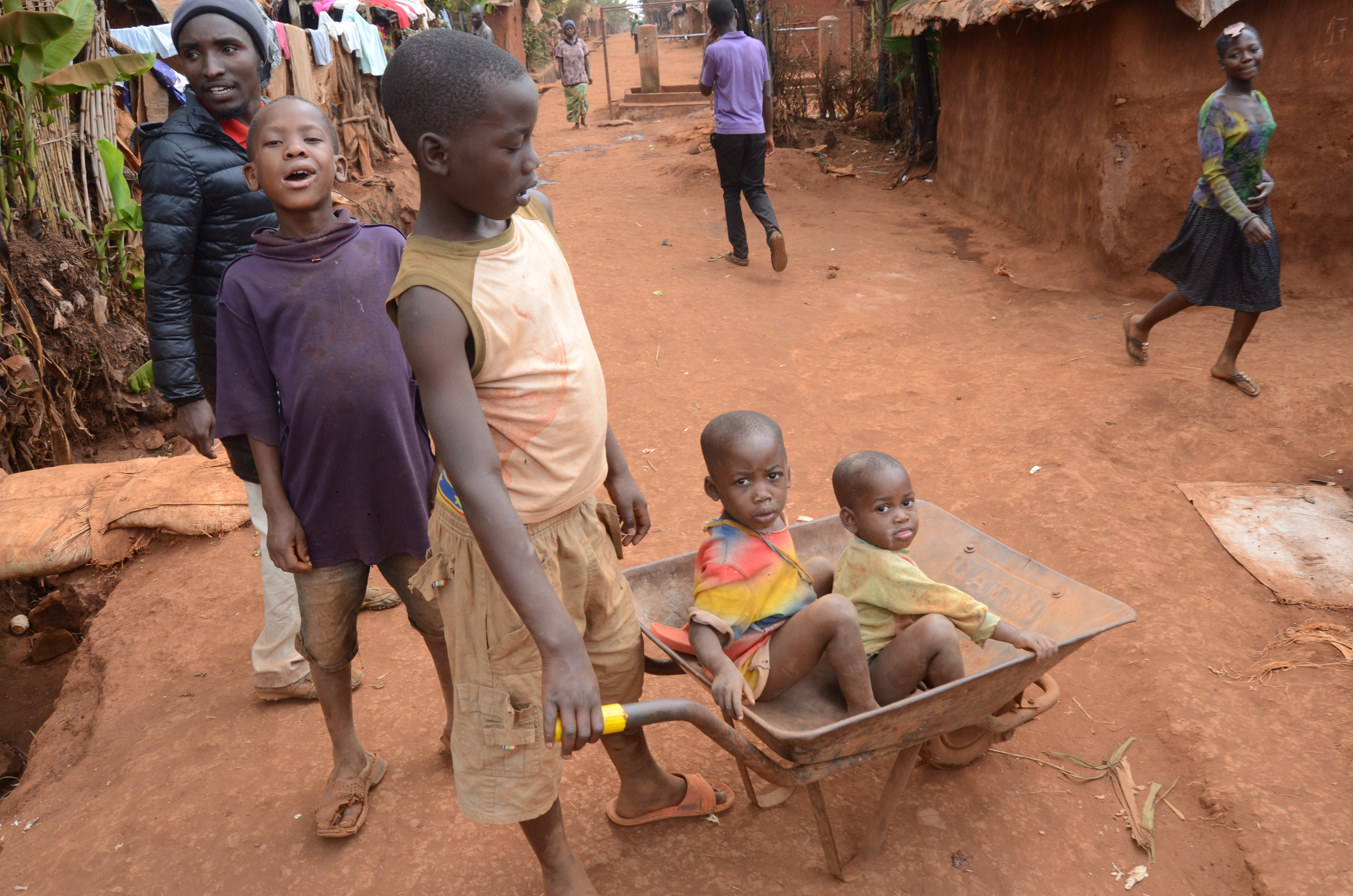
Congolese refugees in Gasorwe

The commune of Gasorwe is a commune of Muyinga Province in northeastern Burundi. The capital lies at Gasorwe.
