= Commune of Buhiga =

Coordinates: 3°01′46″S 30°10′44″E

- Commune
- Interactive map of Commune of Buhiga
- Country: Burundi
- Province: Karuzi Province
- Administrative center: Buhiga
- Time zone: UTC+2 (Central Africa Time)

The commune of Buhiga is a commune of Karuzi Province in central Burundi. The capital lies at Buhiga.
