= Rushubi Hospital =

Geography
- Location: Bujumbura Rural Province, Burundi
- Coordinates: 3.34559°S 29.48366°E

Organisation
- Care system: Public

The Rushubi Hospital (French: Hôpital de Rushubi) is a hospital in Bujumbura Rural Province, Burundi.

== Location ==
The Rushubi Hospital is in the center of the town of Rushubi, to the east of the RP121 highway. The Rushubi Health Center is to the northeast. It is the center and only public hospital in the Isale Health District. It is a public district hospital serving a population of 24,819 in 2014.

== Events ==
The state-run hospital was established by a decree dated 23 September 2003.

In March 2016 it was reported that the manager of the hospital had been dismissed and would be charged with embezzlement.

== Sources ==
- "23 septembre 2003 no. 100/143" (PDF), Bulletin Officiel du Burundi (in French), 1 September 2003
- Carte Sanitaire du Burundi (PDF), Burundi Ministry of Public Health, 2016
- Financement base sur la performance HD Rushubi (in French), Ministere de la Sante Publique et de la Lutte Contre le Sida
- Hakizimana, Placide (31 March 2016), "Menaces de poursuites à un détourneur de l'Hôpital de Rushubi (Video)", Radio Télévision Nationale du Burundi (in French)
- "Way: hopital de Rushubi (790434417)", OpenStreetMap
