= Commune of Bweru =

Coordinates: 3°22′05″S 30°26′04″E

- Commune
- Interactive map of Commune of Bweru
- Country: Burundi
- Province: Ruyigi Province
- Administrative center: Bweru
- Time zone: UTC+2 (Central Africa Time)

The commune of Bweru is a commune of Ruyigi Province in eastern Burundi. The capital lies at Bweru.
