= Commune of Nyabitsinda =

Nyabitsinda Commune in Ruyigi Province, Burundi

Coordinates: 3°32′10″S 30°16′39″E

- Commune
- Interactive map of Commune of Nyabitsinda
- Country: Burundi
- Province: Ruyigi Province
- Administrative center: Nyabitsinda
- Time zone: UTC+2 (Central Africa Time)

The commune of Nyabitsinda is a commune of Ruyigi Province in eastern Burundi. The capital lies at Nyabitsinda. In eastern of Nyabitsinda is Gisuru Commune. In the southeast is Kinyinya Commune and Giharo. In the west of Nyabitsinda is Butaganzwa Commune.
