= Commune of Rutegama =

Coordinates: 3°18′58″S 29°45′13″E

- Commune
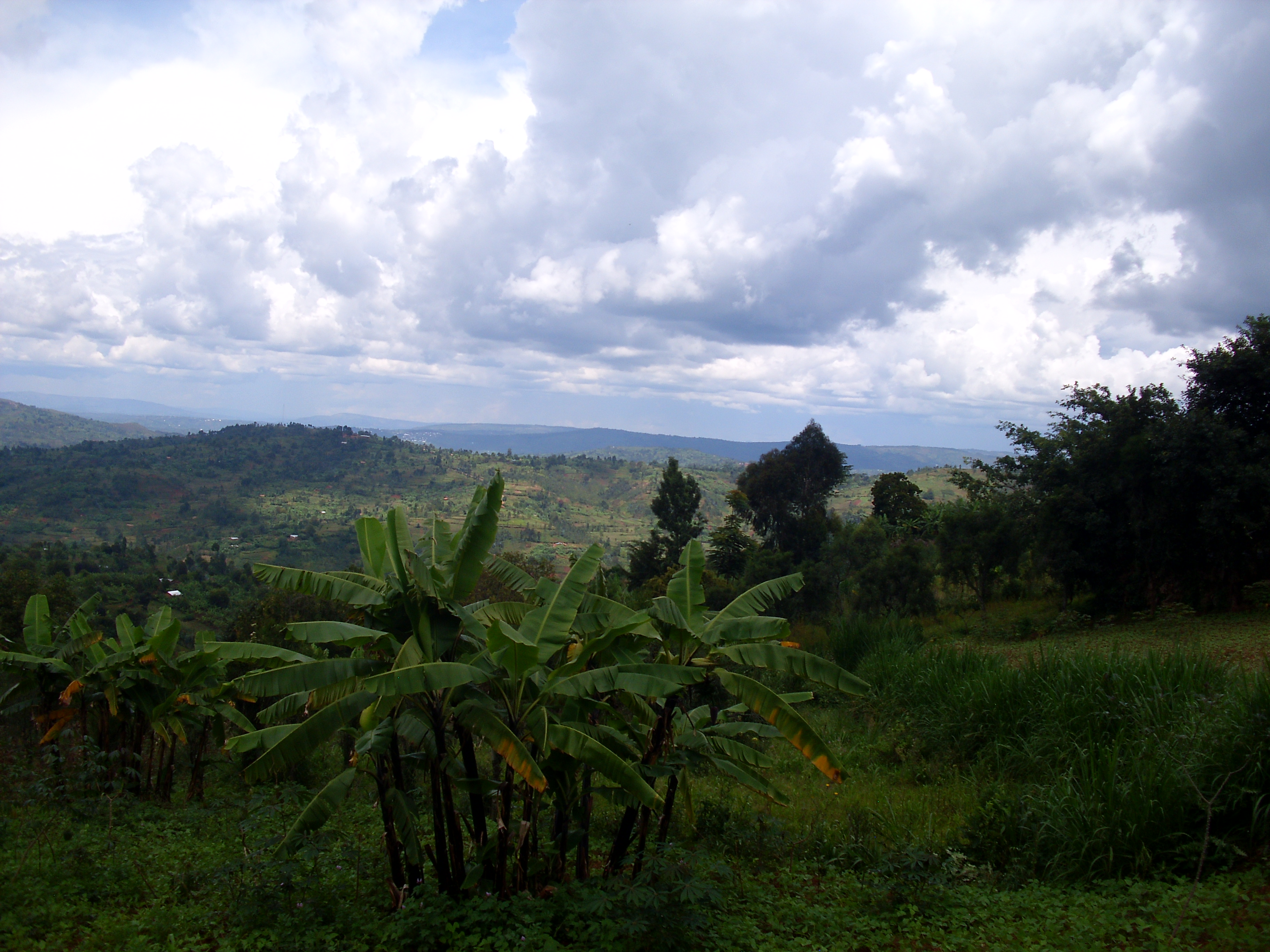
- Commune of Rutegama
- Interactive map of Commune of Rutegama
- Country: Burundi
- Province: Muramvya Province
- Administrative center: Rutegama
- Time zone: UTC+2 (Central Africa Time)

The commune of Rutegama is a commune of Muramvya Province in central-western Burundi. The capital lies at Rutegama.
