= Commune of Ryansoro =

Coordinates: 3°45′57″S 29°47′46″E

- Commune
- Interactive map of Commune of Ryansoro
- Country: Burundi
- Province: Gitega Province
- Administrative center: Ryansoro
- Time zone: UTC+2 (Central Africa Time)

The commune of Ryansoro is a commune of Gitega Province in central Burundi. The capital lies at Ryansoro.
