= Commune of Giheta =

Coordinates: 3°19′04″S 29°50′31″E

- Commune
- Interactive map of Commune of Giheta
- Country: Burundi
- Province: Gitega Province
- Administrative center: Giheta
- Time zone: UTC+2 (Central Africa Time)

The commune of Giheta is a commune of Gitega Province in central Burundi. Its capital is Giheta.
