= Commune of Bukeye =

Coordinates: 3°11′10″S 29°40′32″E

- Commune
- Interactive map of Commune of Bukeye
- Country: Burundi
- Province: Muramvya Province
- Administrative center: Bukeye
- Time zone: UTC+2 (Central Africa Time)

The commune of Bukeye is a commune of Muramvya Province in central-western Burundi. The capital lies at Bukeye.
