= Commune of Gitaramuka =

Coordinates: 2°59′32″S 30°10′27″E

- Commune
- Interactive map of Commune of Gitaramuka
- Country: Burundi
- Province: Karuzi Province
- Administrative center: Gitaramuka
- Time zone: UTC+2 (Central Africa Time)

The commune of Gitaramuka is a commune of Karuzi Province in central Burundi. The capital lies at Gitaramuka.
