= Commune of Muruta =

Coordinates: 2°57′51″S 29°35′36″E

- Commune
- Interactive map of Commune of Muruta
- Country: Burundi
- Province: Kayanza Province
- Administrative center: Muruta
- Time zone: UTC+2 (Central Africa Time)

The commune of Muruta is a commune of Kayanza Province in northern Burundi. The capital lies at Muruta. It is one of the nine communes making Kayanza Province.
