= Commune of Nyabikere =

Coordinates: 3°14′47″S 30°07′07″E

- Commune
- Interactive map of Commune of Nyabikere
- Country: Burundi
- Province: Karuzi Province
- Administrative center: Nyabikere
- Time zone: UTC+2 (Central Africa Time)

The commune of Nyabikere is a commune of Karuzi Province in central Burundi. The capital lies at Nyabikere.
