= Commune of Mbuye =

Coordinates: 3°14′29″S 29°41′30″E

- Commune
- Interactive map of Commune of Mbuye
- Country: Burundi
- Province: Muramvya Province
- Administrative center: Mbuye
- Time zone: UTC+2 (Central Africa Time)

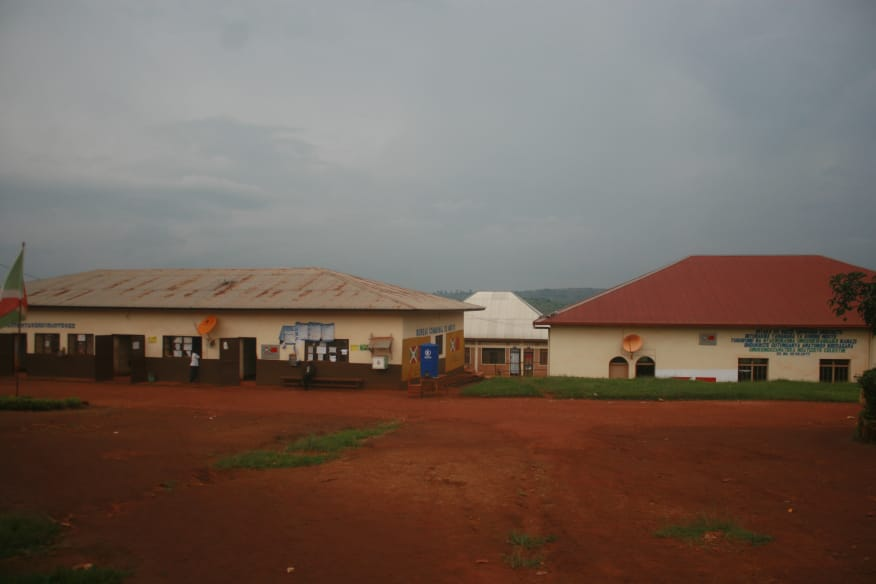
House in Mbuye

The commune of Mbuye is a commune of Muramvya Province in central-western Burundi. The capital lies at Mbuye.
