= Commune of Gahombo =

Coordinates: 2°57′45″S 29°44′02″E

- Commune
- Interactive map of Commune of Gahombo
- Country: Burundi
- Province: Kayanza Province
- Administrative center: Gahombo
- Time zone: UTC+2 (Central Africa Time)

The commune of Gahombo is a commune of Kayanza Province in northern Burundi. The capital lies at Gahombo.
