= Commune of Kigamba =

Kigamba Commune in Cankuzo Province, Burundi

Coordinates: 3°03′20″S 30°28′25″E

- Commune
- Interactive map of Commune of Kigamba
- Country: Burundi
- Province: Cankuzo Province
- Administrative center: Kigamba
- Time zone: UTC+2 (Central Africa Time)

The commune of Kigamba is a commune of Cankuzo Province in north-eastern Burundi. The capital lies at Kigamba.
