= Commune of Mutumba =

Coordinates: 3°15′34″S 30°14′20″E

- Commune
- Interactive map of Commune of Mutumba
- Country: Burundi
- Province: Karuzi Province
- Administrative center: Mutumba
- Time zone: UTC+2 (Central Africa Time)

The commune of Mutumba is a commune of Karuzi Province in central Burundi. The capital lies at Mutumba.
