= Mugamba =

Mugamba may refer to:

- Mugamba natural region, is a natural region of Burundi in the Bururi Province or Burundi
- Commune of Mugamba, a commune in the Bururi Province or Burundi
- Mugamba, Buriri, a town in the Commune of Mugamba
