= Commune of Vyanda =

Coordinates: 4°06′S 29°36′E

- Commune
- Interactive map of Commune of Vyanda
- Country: Burundi
- Province: Bururi Province
- Administrative center: Vyanda
- Time zone: UTC+2 (Central Africa Time)

The commune of Vyanda is a commune of Bururi Province in south-western Burundi. The capital lies at Vyanda. It contains the Vyanda Forest Nature Reserve.
