= Commune of Nyarusange =

Coordinates: 3°32′26″S 29°53′21″E

- Commune
- Interactive map of Commune of Nyarusange
- Country: Burundi
- Province: Gitega Province
- Administrative center: Nyarusange
- Time zone: UTC+2 (Central Africa Time)

The commune of Nyarusange is a commune of Gitega Province in central Burundi.

In 2008 the commune covered 351.7 square kilometres (135.8 sq mi). As of 2008 the commune had a population of 40,904, with a population density of 351.7 per square kilometer. In 2017 it covered 96.36 square kilometres (37.20 sq mi) with 61,218 people and a population density of 637 people per square kilometer.

It extends over two natural regions. The largest part is in the Bututsi natural region, but its temperate tropical climate is typical of the Kirimiro natural region. The economy is dominated by agriculture on small, narrow plots of land, usually less than 0.5 hectares (1.2 acres).

In July 2017 Pierre Nkurunziza, President of Burundi, laid the first sheet of metal on a large building in Nkondo colline, Commune of Nyarusange, that was to hold a school for paramedics. It was being built with the financial support of Vénérand Kazohera, who was a native of the place.

== Sources ==
- "Burundi: Administrative Division", citypopulation
- Lancement du camp de travail pour les jeunes en vacances (in French), Maison Ntare Rushatsi, 15 July 2017
- Presentation de la Commune Nyarusange (in French), Gitega Province
- Sub-Saharan Africa report, United States. Foreign Broadcast Information Service, 1982
