= Commune of Gatara =

Coordinates: 3°00′18″S 29°39′26″E

- Commune
- Interactive map of Commune of Gatara
- Country: Burundi
- Province: Kayanza Province
- Administrative center: Gatara
- Time zone: UTC+2 (Central Africa Time)

The commune of Gatara is a commune of Kayanza Province in northern Burundi. The capital lies at Gatara.
