= Commune of Buhinyuza =

Coordinates: 2°59′11″S 30°26′23″E

- Commune
- Interactive map of Commune of Buhinyuza
- Country: Burundi
- Province: Muyinga Province
- Administrative center: Buhinyuza
- Time zone: UTC+2 (Central Africa Time)

The commune of Buhinyuza is a commune of Muyinga Province in northeastern Burundi. The capital lies at Buhinyuza.
