= Commune of Shombo =

Coordinates: 3°15′11″S 30°02′31″E

- Commune
- Interactive map of Commune of Shombo
- Country: Burundi
- Province: Karuzi Province
- Administrative center: Shombo
- Time zone: UTC+2 (Central Africa Time)

The commune of Shombo is a commune of Karuzi Province in central Burundi. The capital lies at Shombo.
