= Nicolas Bwakira =

Burundian diplomat (1941–2021)

Nicolas Bwakira (November 10, 1941 – March 5, 2021) was a Burundian diplomat, international civil servant and pan-africanist. During his long and exemplary career, Bwakira took on senior roles and responsibilities at various institutions, including the United Nations High Commission for Refugees (UNHCR), the University of South Africa (UNISA), the African Union, the Institute for Security Studies (ISS) and the Crisis Management Initiative (CMI). Bwakira fought the good fight as a pan-Africanist and international civil servant in the service of Africa and its people, especially for those in Namibia, Angola, Somalia and, more recently, the Lake Chad Basin. The quest for peace was his lifelong passion. From the time of his posting in Angola in 1976, he developed a special connection with southern African countries, among which Namibia. From 1976 to 1990, Namibian refugees and Namibia’s independence featured prominently in his professional career. In his role as Coordinator for the return of Namibian exiles, he was instrumental in negotiating a total blanket amnesty with the apartheid government as a condition for the return of Namibian exiles. Later, as Director for Africa (UNHCR, Geneva), he negotiated a total blanket amnesty with the apartheid government, as a pre-condition of the return of South African exiles members of liberation movements.

Bwakira embodied attributes of humility, service, and commitment, addressing to the dedicated population. For over half a century, Bwakira worked for the less fortunate, in the humanitarian field which he mentored for sometime. He was a pan-Africanist and his ideological frameworks continued to influence the movement. Bwakira’s contributed to peace and security in the post-independence diplomatic movement of Africa.

== Early life ==
Bwakira was born on November 10, 1941, in Kabuye, Mugongo-Manga Commune, Bujumbura Province. He attended primary school in Ijenda, Mugongo-Manga and went to begin secondary school at the Petit Séminaire of Mugera. He moved to Bujumbura to attend high school, first at the Athenée Royal and then at the College du Saint Esprit where he obtained his high school diploma. He was awarded a scholarship to attend university in France, where he first studied Law at the University of Nancy before moving to Paris to complete his undergraduate degree in Law at the Université de Paris, Sorbonne. He pursued graduate studies in International Public Law at the same institution. While he was a student in Paris, he participated in the demonstrations of “May 1968”.

== Career at the United Nations High Commission for Refugees ==
Bwakira joined the United Nations High Commission for Refugees (UNHCR) at its headquarters in Geneva, Switzerland as a legal advisor in 1970. He viewed this appointment as temporary and intended to return and serve his native Burundi; in the end, he would spend thirty-two years in various roles at the UNHCR. From 1971 through 1975, Bwakira became the UNHCR deputy regional representative for Africa and head of the liaison office with the Organization of the African Unity (OAU) and the United Nations Economic Commission for Africa (UNECA) in Addis Ababa, Ethiopia. From 1976 to 1978, Bwakira was the United Nations High Commission for Refugees (UNHCR) representative in Angola and at the same the UN coordinator of humanitarian program for rehabilitation and reintegration of refugees and internally displaced persons in Angola. It was during this period that he developed a special connection with the plight of refugees and exiles in South Africa, who were fighting for their full rights and total liberation, especially in Namibia, Angola, and South Africa.

From 1978, Bwakira worked at the UNHCR headquarters as head of Central and West Africa Desk until 1982 when he was posted to Ethiopia again as United Nations High Commission for Refugees representative for Africa and UNECA. In 1988, Bwakira returned to the UNHCR headquarters as deputy director for Africa. The process leading to Namibia’s independence was unfolding and he was appointed the UNHCR coordinator for the return of Namibian exiles and coordinator for UN humanitarian operations in Windhoek, Namibia where he coordinated the repatriation of over 43 000 Namibians in 1989. Prior to the return of exiles, Bwakira undertook a mission to northern Namibia to assess the safety and security of returning exiles. He detested the intimidating presence and mischievous behaviours of Koevoet members who were transformed into the South West Africa Police (SWAPOL).

After leaving Namibia in 1990, Bwakira returned to the UNHCR headquarters in Geneva, Switzerland as director for Africa, where he was involved in the negotiations for the return of South African exiles. There, he demonstrated his negotiation talents and diplomatic acumen. In 1994, Bwakira was appointed UNHCR regional director for the SADC region, based in Pretoria, South Africa until his posting to the UN Headquarters in New York, US as Director of the UNHCR Office at the United Nations Headquarters. He retired from the United Nations High Commission for Refugees in 2002. Throughout his career, Bwakira was committed to peace and the protection of refugees and asylum-seekers; his resolve to improve their lives was legendary.

== Namibia Independence ==
Bwakira contributed immensely to Namibia's transition to independence, he oversaw the return of Namibia exiles in his role as UNHCR Deputy Director for Africa in 1989. Bwakira came to Namibia in 1989 as part of the United Nations Transitional Assistance Group (UNTAG). Prior to that, Bwakira had interacted with Namibian refugees in Angola where he was stationed as the UNHCR representative for Angola. When the first fight carrying Namibians arrived at the then JG Strydom airport, now Hosea Kutako International Airport, Bwakira was there to satisfy himself that exiles were safely back to their motherland. A moving picture in The Namibian newspaper of 13 June 1989 showed Bwakira holding a hand of an exiled child, walking her to the terminal. Bwakira performed his tasks with utmost diligence and accomplishment. His eldest daughter Carine, then a high school learner came to visit him. Carine had long known President Nujoma whom she fondly called "my President" during her father’s posting in Angola. She had the posters of President Nujoma and Che Guevara hanging in her room. During her visit to her father in 1989, Carine spent six weeks in Namibia and had an opportunity to meet “her President”.

== Director of International Relations and Partnerships at UNISA ==
After retiring from UNHCR in 2002, Bwakira joined the University of South Africa (UNISA) as the Director of International Relations and Partnerships until 2007. Under the leadership of the Principal & Vice-Chancellor Dr. Barney Pityana, he helped to extend the reach of distance education to African countries, which culminated with the opening of the UNISA-Ethiopia Regional Centre in Addis-Ababa and the establishment of the South Sudan civil servant training program. Bwakira went on to serve on the international advisory board for the South Sudan Center for Strategic and Policy Studies (CSPS), a think-tank institution that aspires to be a leading research institution in the region and internationally in the fields of strategic and policy studies.

== African Union Special Envoy to Somalia and Head of AMISOM ==
From 2007 to 2009, Bwakira served as the Special Envoy of the Chairperson of the African Union Commission to Somalia and Head of the African Union Mission in Somalia (AMISOM). During his tenure, he facilitated mediation among Somali stakeholders and worked to mobilize regional and international support for peacebuilding efforts in Somalia. According to AMISOM, Bwakira also played a mediatory role between the Transitional Federal Government of Somalia and other Somali stakeholders and helped engage regional, continental, and international partners in support of peace and security initiatives in the country.

== Roles as Advisor and Trustee ==
Upon stepping down from his distinguished career with the United Nations High Commission for Refugees, and having served as the African Union Special Envoy for Somalia, in addition to numerous other roles, Bwakira joined the Crisis Management Initiative (CMI) as a Senior Advisor in 2014. His experience in diplomacy and professional connections supported CMI’s work in Africa. He focused on including the women and young people in peace-making and dialogue efforts. His work contributed to the organization's projects across the continent. Bwakira was passionate about women empowerment; seeing men and women as equal partners in the quest for peace, and a fundamental principle for work. Bwakira worked for many years to support women’s leadership in the South Sudan's fragile peace process. He also contributed significantly to CMI’s dialogue efforts in Central African Republic and the Lake Chad Basin and in solidifying CMI’s partnerships with the African Union and sub-regional institution.

Bwakira was also a long-standing member of the Institute for Security Studies (ISS) Board of Trustees where he consistently advocated for those in Africa who are marginalized and vulnerable. He is remembered by the ISS colleagues for his inquisitive mind and energy, his meticulous preparations, and contribution to the work of the ISS.

Bwakira was a member of the Africa Humanitarian Action (AHA) international Board of Trustees since its inception in 1994, offering his counsel tirelessly up until his formal retirement from the board at AHA's 25th anniversary in 2019. During the AHA's 25th anniversary markings held in Kigali, Rwanda, Bwakira delivered the event's closing remarks, highlighting the role of African NGOs and the need for strengthened solidarity and collaboration between all stakeholders to find durable solutions to forced displacement in Africa. Bwakira was a thoughtful and meticulous person, a humanitarian at heart and an ardent pan-Africanist. His voice and committed support for African NGOs, as a critical component in the humanitarian sector will be greatly missed.
