= Commune of Butihinda =

Coordinates: 2°44′31″S 30°19′06″E

- Commune
- Interactive map of Commune of Butihinda
- Country: Burundi
- Province: Muyinga Province
- Administrative center: Butihinda
- Time zone: UTC+2 (Central Africa Time)

The commune of Butihinda is a commune of Muyinga Province in northeastern Burundi. The capital lies at Butihinda.
