= Commune of Gisuru =

Coordinates: 3°27′11″S 30°29′40″E

- Commune
- Interactive map of Commune of Gisuru
- Country: Burundi
- Province: Ruyigi Province
- Administrative center: Gisuru
- Time zone: UTC+2 (Central Africa Time)

The commune of Gisuru is a commune of Ruyigi Province in eastern Burundi. The capital lies at Gisuru.
