= Commune of Itaba =

Coordinates: 3°40′36″S 30°00′43″E

Commune of Itaba Taba
- Commune
- Itaba
- Interactive map of Commune of Itaba
- Country: Burundi
- Province: Gitega Province
- Administrative center: Itaba

Government
  - The Administrateur Communal: Ms Béatrice NIYONZIMA

Area
  - Total: 66 sq mi (170 km^{2})

Population
  - Total: 54,793 inhabitants as per September 2,006
  - Density: 830/sq mi (322/km^{2})
- Time zone: UTC+2 (Central Africa Time)
- Postal code: BP 118 Gitega

The commune of Itaba is a municipality in the Gitega Province of Burundi. The capital lies at Itaba.

== Administrative structure ==
Zones and administrative divisions

- ZONE BUHEVYI
  - Kagoma
  - Kanyonga
  - Rukobe II
  - Rukobe I
- ZONE GIHAMAGARA
  - Buhinda
  - Gihamagara
  - Kibogoye
  - Kirambi
  - Kugitega
  - Mugomera
  - Ruhanza
- ZONE ITABA
  - Buhanga
  - Butare
  - Gisikara
  - Itaba
  - Kanyinya
  - Karemba
  - Macu
  - Mutanga
  - Nkima
