= Commune of Gishubi =

Coordinates: 3°37′01″S 29°51′30″E

- Commune
- Interactive map of Commune of Gishubi
- Country: Burundi
- Province: Gitega Province
- Administrative center: Gishubi
- Time zone: UTC+2 (Central Africa Time)

The commune of Gishubi is a commune of Gitega Province in central Burundi. The capital lies at Gishubi.
