= Mount Kikizi =

Mountain in Burundi

Kikizi
- Location within Burundi

Highest point
- Elevation: 2,145 m (7,037 ft)
- Coordinates: 3°54′17″S 29°51′09″E

Mount Kikizi is one of the highest mountains in Burundi. Its summit is at a height of 2,145 m (7,038 ft). The mountain stands in the country's southeast, between the towns of Rutana and Kinyinya.

A spring emanating from Mount Kikizi, the Ruvyironza, was identified by Burkhart Waldecker as being the source of the White Nile.
