= Burundian genocide =

The Burundian genocide may refer to:

- the Ikiza – the 1972 mass killings of Hutus
- the 1993 ethnic violence in Burundi against Tutsis
