= Commune of Butaganzwa =

Coordinates: 3°07′01″S 29°41′30″E

- Commune
- Interactive map of Commune of Butaganzwa
- Country: Burundi
- Province: Kayanza Province
- Administrative center: Butaganzwa
- Time zone: UTC+2 (Central Africa Time)

The commune of Butaganzwa is a commune of Kayanza Province in northern Burundi. The capital lies at Butaganzwa. In 2007, DGHER electrified two rural villages in the commune.
