= Mutambu (commune) =

Commune of Mutambu
- Commune
- Interactive map of Commune of Mutambu
- Country: Burundi
- Time zone: UTC+2 (Central Africa Time)

Mutambu is a commune of Bujumbura Rural Province in Burundi.

== See also ==
- Communes of Burundi
