= Nyabiraba (commune) =

Commune of Nyabiraba
- Commune
- Interactive map of Commune of Nyabiraba
- Coordinates: 3°28′17″S 29°29′24″E
- Country: Burundi
- Time zone: UTC+2 (Central Africa Time)

Nyabiraba is a commune of Bujumbura Rural Province in Burundi.

== See also ==
- Communes of Burundi
