= Kanyosha (commune) =

Commune of Kanyosha
- Commune
- Interactive map of Commune of Kanyosha
- Country: Burundi
- Time zone: UTC+2 (Central Africa Time)

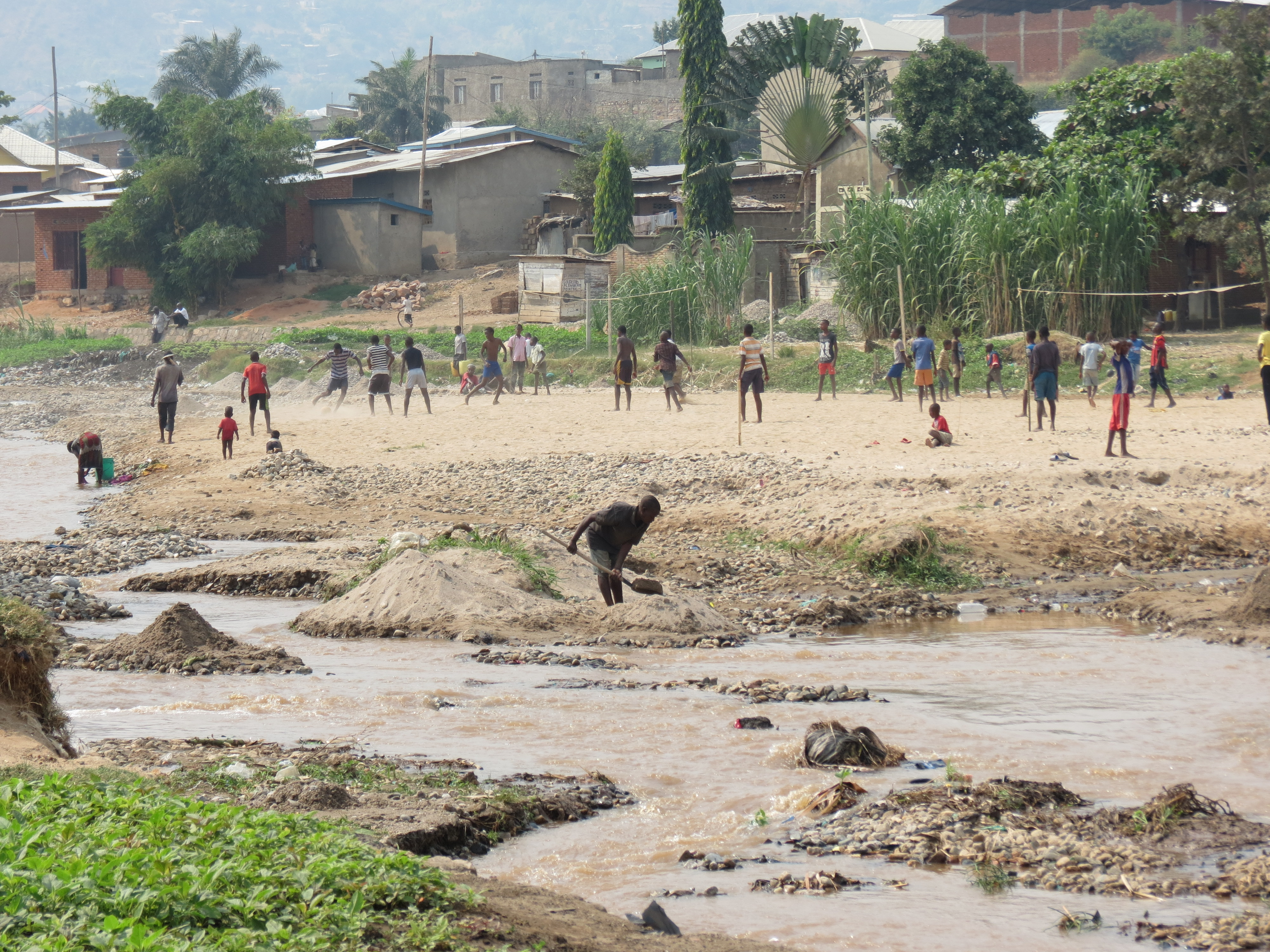
A scene in Kanyosha next to the river. One man digs sand and several people play football

Kanyosha is a commune of Bujumbura Rural Province in Burundi.

== See also ==
- Communes of Burundi
