= Commune of Makebuko =

Coordinates: 3°35′37″S 30°00′04″E

- Commune
- Interactive map of Commune of Makebuko
- Country: Burundi
- Province: Gitega Province
- Administrative center: Makebuko
- Time zone: UTC+2 (Central Africa Time)

The commune of Makebuko is a commune of Gitega Province in central Burundi. The capital lies at Makebuko.
