= Commune of Muyinga =

- Commune
- Location within Burundi
- Coordinates: 2°50′58″S 30°20′10″E
- Country: Burundi
- Province: Buhumuza Province
- Established: 2024
- Largest city: Muyinga

Government
  - Commune Administrator: Hon. Amedée Misago
  - Executive Secretary: Dieudonné Niyonizigiye

Area
  - Total: 989.58 km^{2} (382.08 sq mi)
- Elevation: 1,731 m (5,679 ft)

Population (2024 census)
  - Total: 600,915
  - Density: 607.24/km^{2} (1,572.8/sq mi)
- Time zone: UTC+2 (Central Africa Time)
- Website: Commune of Muyinga

The commune of Muyinga is one of the 7 communes of Buhumuza Province in northeastern Burundi. It is made up of the former communes of Muyinga, Gasorwe, Buhinyuza and Mwakiro. The communal office lies at Muyinga.
