= Commune of Mutaho =

Coordinates: 3°09′28″S 29°51′52″E

- Commune
- Interactive map of Commune of Mutaho
- Country: Burundi
- Province: Gitega Province
- Administrative center: Mutaho
- Time zone: UTC+2 (Central Africa Time)

The commune of Mutaho is a commune of Gitega Province in central Burundi. The capital lies at Mutaho.
