= Commune of Gisagara =

Coordinates: 2°37′S 29°51′E

- Commune
- Interactive map of Commune of Gisagara
- Country: Burundi
- Province: Cankuzo Province
- Administrative center: Gisagara
- Time zone: UTC+2 (Central Africa Time)

The commune of Gisagara is a commune of Cankuzo Province in north-eastern Burundi. The capital lies at Gisagara.
