= Commune of Muramvya =

- Commune
- Location within Burundi
- Coordinates: 3°16′14″S 29°37′19″E
- Country: Burundi
- Province: Muramvya Province
- Administrative center: Muramvya

Area
  - Total: 193.00 km^{2} (74.52 sq mi)
- Elevation: 1,895 m (6,217 ft)

Population (2008 census)
  - Total: 81,257
  - Density: 421.02/km^{2} (1,090.4/sq mi)
- Time zone: UTC+2 (Central Africa Time)

The commune of Muramvya was a commune of the Muramvya Province in central-western Burundi. The capital was at Muramvya.
