= Commune of Cankuzo =

- Commune
- Location within Burundi
- Coordinates: 3°13′10″S 30°33′10″E
- Country: Burundi
- Province: Cankuzo Province
- Administrative center: Cankuzo

Area
  - Total: 488.62 km^{2} (188.66 sq mi)
- Elevation: 1,540 m (5,050 ft)

Population (2008 census)
  - Total: 47,972
  - Density: 98.179/km^{2} (254.28/sq mi)
- Time zone: UTC+2 (Central Africa Time)

The commune of Cankuzo is a commune of Cankuzo Province in north-eastern Burundi. The capital lies at Cankuzo.
