= Mugina =

Mugina may refer to:

- Commune of Mugina, commune of Burundi
- Mugina, Kigali, suburb of Kigali, Rwanda
