= Commune of Mugamba =

Coordinates: 3°36′31″S 29°36′25″E

- Commune
- Interactive map of Commune of Mugamba
- Country: Burundi
- Province: Bururi Province
- Administrative center: Mugamba
- Time zone: UTC+2 (Central Africa Time)

The commune of Mugamba is a commune of Bururi Province in south-western Burundi. The capital lies at Mugamba.
