= Commune of Nyabihanga =

Coordinates: 3°25′55″S 29°49′17″E

- Commune
- Interactive map of Commune of Nyabihanga
- Country: Burundi
- Province: Mwaro Province
- Administrative center: Nyabihanga
- Time zone: UTC+2 (Central Africa Time)

The commune of Nyabihanga is a commune of Mwaro Province in central Burundi. The capital lies at Nyabihanga.
