= Rwibaga Hospital =

Geography
- Location: Bujumbura Rural Province, Burundi
- Coordinates: 3.4714°S 29.53880°E

Organisation
- Care system: Public

Links
- Lists: Hospitals in Burundi

The Rwibaga Hospital (French: Hôpital de Rwibaga) is a hospital in Bujumbura Rural Province, Burundi.

== Location ==
The Rwibaga Hospital is a hospital in the Rwibaga Health District. It is near the faith-based Ijenda Hospital, the other hospital in the district. It is a public district hospital serving a population of 50,855 as of 2014. The hospital is in the village of Rwibaga to the northeast of Ijenda.

== Events ==
In 1963 there was an epidemic of typhus transmitted by lice in the province, with nine cases dying at Rwibaga Hospital between July and November. The hospital and dispensary staff were given instructions in delousing patients and their contacts.

In May 2023 Antonio Capone, Head of Cooperation of the European Union in Burundi, visited the hospital. In the past it had been threatened by erosion, and had constant disputes with its neighbors over rainwater from the hospital premises threatening their fields and houses. Actions of Team Europe had fixed these problems.

Team Europe had also rehabilitated and extended the premises, and equipped and digitized almost all of its services with laptops and desktop computers, including the maternity ward and the operating room. The work had started in December 2020, to be completed in April 2021. Important elements included construction of the latrines with drainable pits, and installation of toilets with seats and showers inside the hospital blocks to help patients who had difficulty moving.

In May 2023 the hospital was still experiencing difficulties. Intermittent failures in the internet connections were causing delays in treatment. Shortage of staff was another problem, with 22 nurses and 4 doctors (including the medical director) looking after from 500 to 900 patients per month. Lack of vehicles and lack of a morgue were also issues.

== Sources ==
- Carte Sanitaire du Burundi (PDF), Burundi Ministry of Public Health, 2016
- Financement base sur la performance HD Rwibaga (in French), Ministere de la Sante Publique et de la Lutte Contre le Sida
- "L'équipe Europe s'engage à rester un partenaire fiable pour le long terme dans le secteur de la santé et de l'énergie", Agence Burundaise de Presse (in French), 1 June 2023
- Morvan, Carla (2021-09-29), "Burundi: La réhabilitation de l'Hôpital de district de Rwibaga - une condition sine qua non à l'informatisation", Open.Enabel (in French)
- Niyongabo, Jean Marie Vianney (3 June 2023), "L'hôpital de Rwibaga confronté à pas mal de couacs malgré certaines avancées", Burundi Eco (in French)
- TYPHUS Africa Burundi (PDF), 1963
- "Way: Hôpital Rwibaga (785048391)", OpenStreetMap
