= Commune of Mubimbi =

Coordinates: 3.284638°S 29.494431°E

- Commune
- Interactive map of Commune of Mubimbi
- Country: Burundi
- Time zone: UTC+2 (Central Africa Time)

Mubimbi is a commune of Bujumbura Rural Province in Burundi.

== See also ==
- Communes of Burundi
