= Mukike (commune) =

Commune of Mukike
- Commune
- Interactive map of Commune of Mukike
- Country: Burundi
- Time zone: UTC+2 (Central Africa Time)

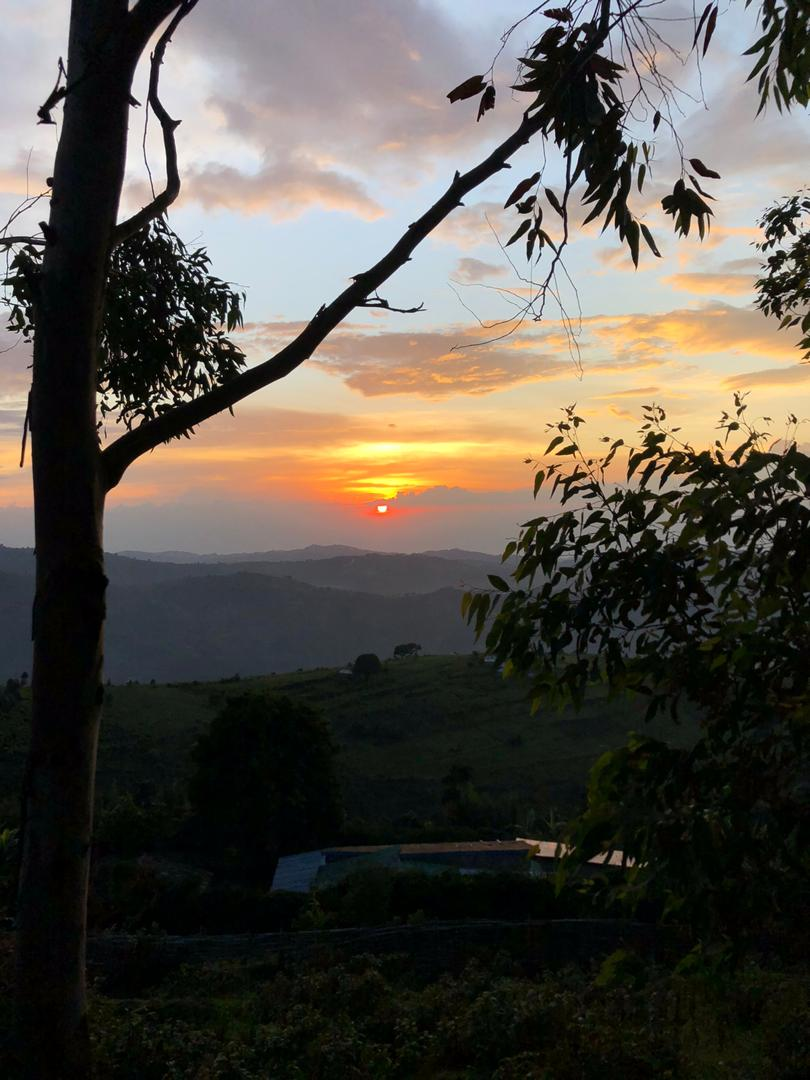
A sunset view over Mount Heha in the Mukike commune, Burundi

Mukike is a commune of Bujumbura Rural Province in Burundi.

== See also ==
- Communes of Burundi
