= Burundi genocide =

Burundi genocide may refer to:

- The Ikiza in 1972
- The 1993 ethnic violence in Burundi
