= Vyanda Forest Nature Reserve =

Protected forest reserve in Burundi

- Réserve Naturelle Forestière de Vyanda
- IUCN category Ib (wilderness area)
- Location within Burundi
- Location: Bururi Province, Burundi
- Nearest city: Vyanda
- Coordinates: 4.1302°S 29.5916°E
- Area: 44.97 km^{2} (17.36 sq mi)
- Designation: Nature reserve
- Designated: 1980
- Operator: Burundian Office for the Protection of the Environment (OBPE)

The Vyanda Forest Nature Reserve is found in Burundi. It was established in 1980. This site is 6 km^{2} (2.3 sq mi).
