= Commune of Buyengero =

Coordinates: 3°48′03″S 29°33′57″E

- Commune
- Interactive map of Commune of Buyengero
- Country: Burundi
- Province: Rumonge Province
- Administrative center: Buyengero

Area
  - Total: 214.72 km^{2} (82.90 sq mi)

Population (2008 census)
  - Total: 58,670
  - Density: 273.2/km^{2} (707.7/sq mi)
- Time zone: UTC+2 (Central Africa Time)

Buyengero is a commune of Rumonge Province in southwestern Burundi. The capital is Buyengero.
