= Ijenda Hospital =

Geography
- Location: Ijenda, Mugongo-Manga, Bujumbura Rural Province, Burundi
- Coordinates: 3.48048°S 29.56752°E

Organisation
- Care system: Public

Links
- Lists: Hospitals in Burundi

The Ijenda Hospital (French: Hôpital d'Ijenda) is a hospital in Bujumbura Rural Province, Burundi.

== Location ==
The Ijenda Hospital is a faith-based hospital in the Rwibaga Health District. It is to the east of the Rwibaga Hospital, the other hospital in the district. It is an approved district hospital serving a population of 50,855 as of 2014.

== Events ==
The private Ijenda Hospital was created in1974, but its services were expensive for most of the local population.

In December 2013 an ophthalmological center built by the Lions Club Bujumbura Doyen was handed over to the Congregation of the Annunciades Sisters of Ijenda. The Ijenda hospital was a partner in the project due to its experience in health care in the area. The project had been supported by the Annunciades Sisters since 2006 with a building plot and rehabilitation of existing buildings. The eye center is located beside the hospital.

== Sources ==
- Ndayisaba, Éric (2016), La région théicole d’Ijenda (Burundi) : économie et société, 1965-2011. Histoire. (PDF) (in French)
- Carte Sanitaire du Burundi (PDF), Burundi Ministry of Public Health, 2016
- Financement base sur la performance HD Ijenda (in French), Ministere de la Sante Publique et de la Lutte Contre le Sida
- "Hospital D'ijenda", Google maps
- Uwimana, Diane (16 December 2013), "Désormais, un centre ophtalmologique d'Ijenda", Iwacu (in French)
