= Mugongo-Manga =

Commune of Bujumbura Rural Province, Burundi

Coordinates: 3.443°S 29.554°E

Mugongo-Manga is one of the communes of Bujumbura Rural Province, located in natural region of Mugamba.

== Administration ==
Mugongo-Manga is divided into 3 zones: Kankima, Ijenda and Mugongo.

Mugongo-Manga contains the collines of Mwura, Kayoyo, Butaganzwa, Mugongo, Gisarwe, Nyamugari, Murunga, Kibira, Rutambiro, Mugoyi, Ijenda, Rwibaga, Centre-Urbain, Buhoro and Nyarushanga.

== Health ==
The commune of Mugongo-Manga has 2 main hospitals: Ijenda Hospital and Rwibaga Hospital; there are 2 other health centers in Kankima and Mugongo.

== Education ==
There are 4 high schools in Mugongo-Manga: Kankima (college communal), Ijenda (Lycee), Rwibaga (college communal), and Mugongo (college communal). There are several elementary schools.

== Sources ==
- "Burundi / Bujumbura Rural / Mugongomanga", GADM
