= Cankuzo =

- City
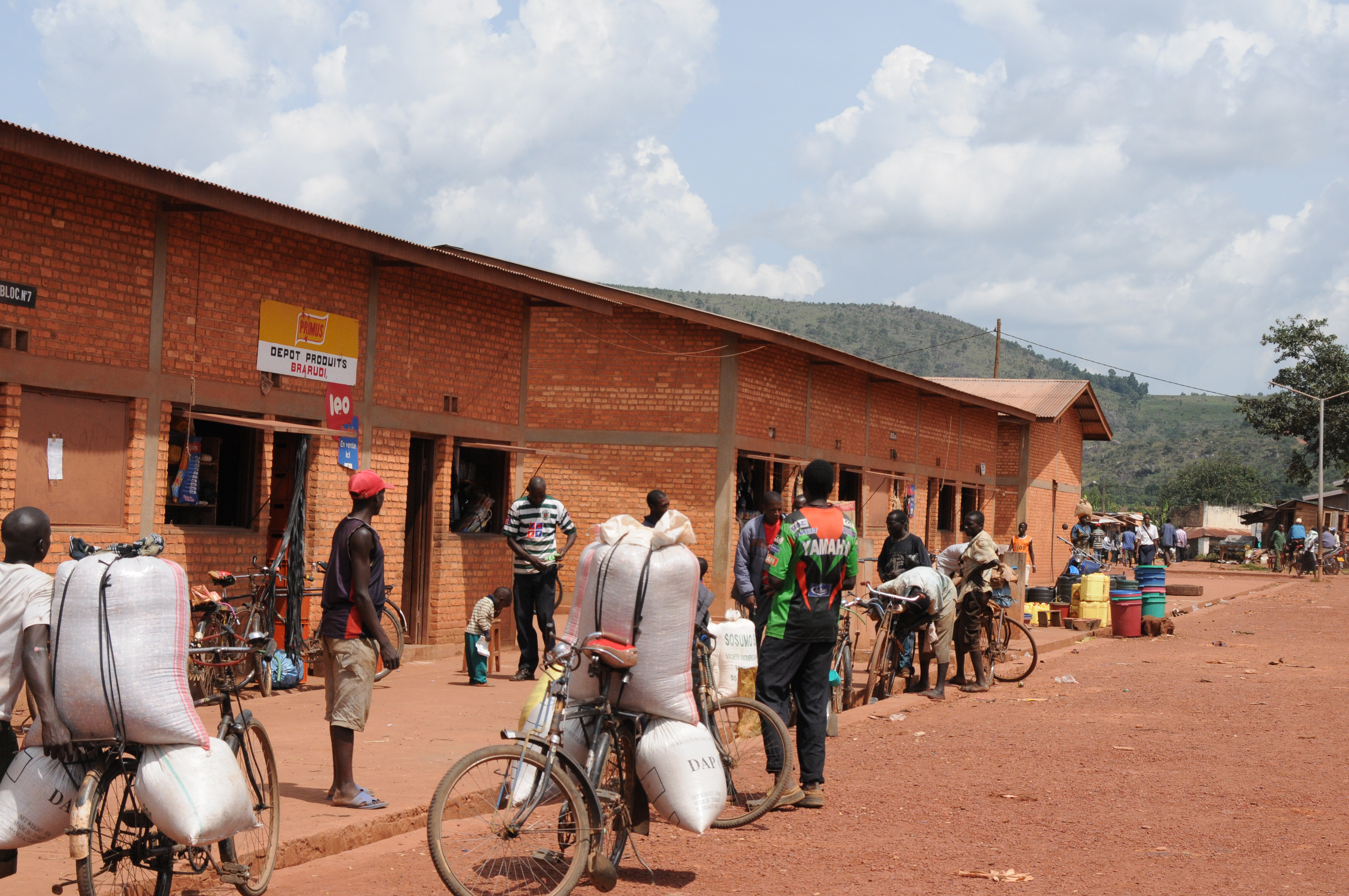
- Market in Cankuzo

- Location in Burundi
- Coordinates: 3°13′10″S 30°33′10″E
- Country: Burundi
- Province: Cankuzo Province
- Commune: Commune of Cankuzo
- Elevation: 5,308 ft (1,618 m)

Population (2008)
  - Total: 3,624
- Time zone: UTC+02:00 (CAT)

Cankuzo is a city located in eastern Burundi. It is the capital city of Cankuzo Province.
