= Isale (commune) =

Commune of Isale
- Commune
- Location within Burundi
- Coordinates: 3°20′45″S 29°29′03″E
- Country: Burundi
- Time zone: UTC+2 (Central Africa Time)

Isale is a commune of Bujumbura Rural Province in Burundi. It is also the capital of Bujumbura Rural Province.

It contains the collines' of Benga, Karunga, Bibare, Kwigere, Rutegama, Rushubi, Cirisha, Nyambuye, Nyarumpongo, Caranka, Nyakibande, Nyarukere, Buyimba, Sagara and Kibuye.

== See also ==
- Communes of Burundi

== Sources ==
- "Burundi / Bujumbura Rural / Isale", GADM
