= Mutimbuzi (commune) =

Coordinates: 3.33627°S 29.23232°E

Commune of Mutimbuzi
- Commune
- Interactive map of Commune of Mutimbuzi
- Country: Burundi
- Time zone: UTC+2 (Central Africa Time)

Mutimbuzi is a commune of Bujumbura Rural Province in Burundi.

== See also ==
- Communes of Burundi
