= Commune of Bugarama =

- Commune
- Location within Burundi
- Coordinates: 3.70775°S 29.35100°E
- Country: Burundi
- Time zone: UTC+2 (Central Africa Time)

Bugarama is a commune of Rumonge Province in Burundi. The seat lies at Bugarama.

== 2020 attack ==
Between August 23 and 24, 2020, militants from RED-Tabara attacked the city of Bugarama, Burundi, resulting in the death of eleven civilians and five militants. Several RED-Tabara militants, including the commander of the Bugarama attack, were arrested in Rwanda on September 29. They claimed that the Bugarama attack was against Burundian forces and Imbonerakure.

== Flooding ==
In December 2023 heavy rains flooded hundreds of hectares of crop fields and caused landslides in the communes of Bugarama and Muhuta.

== See also ==
- Communes of Burundi

== Sources ==
- Nzorubonanya, Félix (9 December 2023), "Région Sud/Rumonge-Muhuta : Au moins 4 personnes sont mortes, une dizaine blessée", Iwacu
