= Communes of Burundi =

The provinces of Burundi are subdivided into 119 communes. The communes are further subdivided into collines.

Burundi's provinces and communes were created on Christmas Day in 1959 by a Belgian colonial decree. They replaced the pre-existing system of chieftains.

In July 2022, the government of Burundi announced a complete overhaul of the country's territorial subdivisions. The proposed change would reduce the amounts of provinces from 18 to 5, and reduce the amount of communes from 119 to 42. The change were approve by both the National Assembly and the Senate. The new territorial subdivisions will take effect with the 2025 parliamentary elections.

The communes (before the 2025 reform) are listed below, by province:

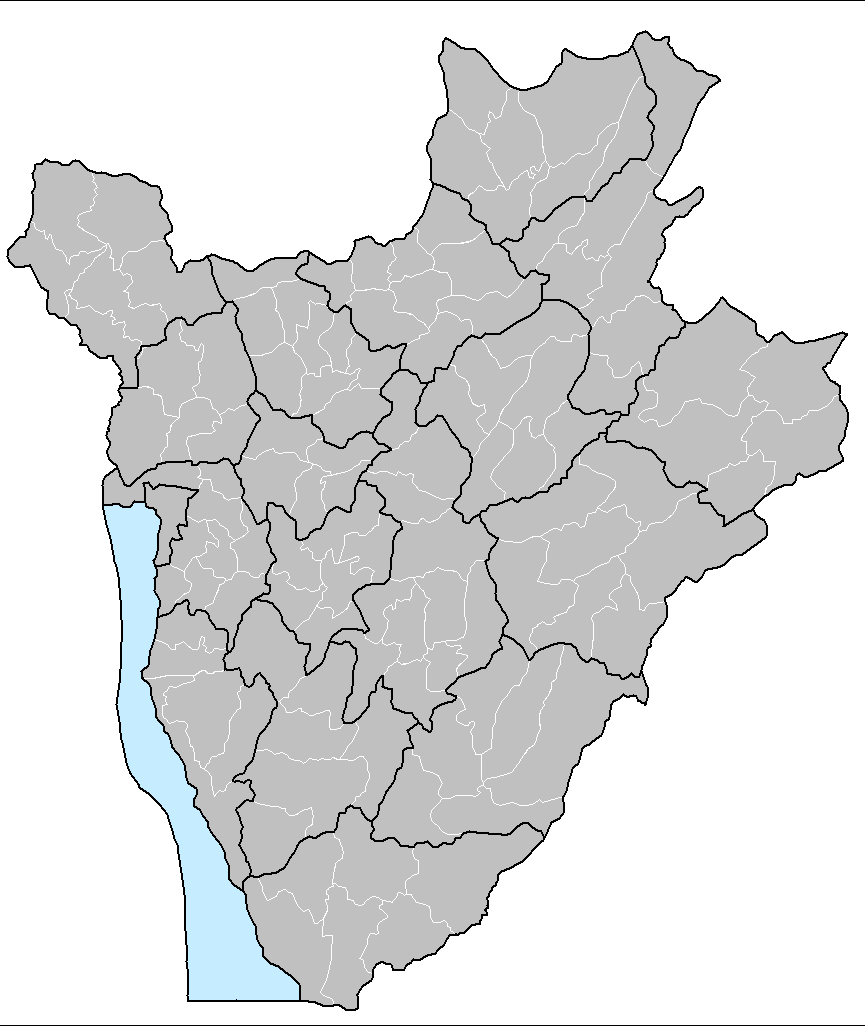
Communes of Burundi

== Bubanza ==
1. Commune of Bubanza
2. Commune of Gihanga
3. Commune of Musigati
4. Commune of Mpanda
5. Commune of Rugazi

== Bujumbura Mairie ==
1. Commune of Muha
2. Commune of Mukaza
3. Commune of Ntahangwa

== Bujumbura Rural ==
1. Commune of Isale
2. Commune of Kabezi
3. Commune of Kanyosha
4. Commune of Mubimbi
5. Commune of Mugongomanga
6. Commune of Mukike
7. Commune of Mutambu
8. Commune of Mutimbuzi
9. Commune of Nyabiraba

== Bururi ==
1. Commune of Bururi
2. Commune of Matana
3. Commune of Mugamba
4. Commune of Rutovu
5. Commune of Songa
6. Commune of Vyanda

== Cankuzo ==
1. Commune of Cankuzo
2. Commune of Cendajuru
3. Commune of Gisagara
4. Commune of Kigamba
5. Commune of Mishiha

== Cibitoke ==
1. Commune of Buganda
2. Commune of Bukinanyana
3. Commune of Mabayi
4. Commune of Mugina
5. Commune of Murwi
6. Commune of Rugombo

== Gitega ==
1. Commune of Bugendana
2. Commune of Bukirasazi
3. Commune of Buraza
4. Commune of Giheta
5. Commune of Gishubi
6. Commune of Gitega
7. Commune of Itaba
8. Commune of Makebuko
9. Commune of Mutaho
10. Commune of Nyanrusange
11. Commune of Ryansoro

== Karuzi ==
1. Commune of Bugenyuzi
2. Commune of Buhiga
3. Commune of Gihogazi
4. Commune of Gitaramuka
5. Commune of Mutumba
6. Commune of Nyabikere
7. Commune of Shombo

== Kayanza ==
1. Commune of Butaganzwa
2. Commune of Gahombo
3. Commune of Gatara
4. Commune of Kabarore
5. Commune of Kayanza
6. Commune of Matongo
7. Commune of Muhanga
8. Commune of Muruta
9. Commune of Rango

== Kirundo ==
1. Commune of Bugabira
2. Commune of Busoni
3. Commune of Bwambarangwe
4. Commune of Gitobe
5. Commune of Kirundo
6. Commune of Ntega
7. Commune of Vumbi

== Makamba ==
1. Commune of Kayogoro
2. Commune of Kibago
3. Commune of Mabanda
4. Commune of Makamba
5. Commune of Nyanza-Lac
6. Commune of Vugizo

== Muramvya ==
1. Commune of Bukeye
2. Commune of Kiganda
3. Commune of Mbuye
4. Commune of Muramvya
5. Commune of Rutegama

== Muyinga ==
1. Commune of Buhinyuza
2. Commune of Butihinda
3. Commune of Gashoho
4. Commune of Gasorwe
5. Commune of Giteranyi
6. Commune of Muyinga
7. Commune of Mwakiro

== Mwaro ==
1. Commune of Bisoro
2. Commune of Gisozi
3. Commune of Kayokwe
4. Commune of Ndava
5. Commune of Nyabihanga
6. Commune of Rusaka

== Ngozi ==
1. Commune of Busiga
2. Commune of Gashikanwa
3. Commune of Kiremba
4. Commune of Marangara
5. Commune of Mwumba
6. Commune of Ngozi
7. Commune of Nyamurenza
8. Commune of Ruhororo
9. Commune of Tangara

== Rumonge ==
1. Commune of Bugarama
2. Commune of Burambi
3. Commune of Buyengero
4. Commune of Muhuta
5. Commune of Rumonge

== Rutana ==
1. Commune of Bukemba
2. Commune of Giharo
3. Commune of Gitanga
4. Commune of Mpinga-Kayove
5. Commune of Musongati
6. Commune of Rutana

== Ruyigi ==
1. Commune of Butaganzwa
2. Commune of Butezi
3. Commune of Bweru
4. Commune of Gisuru
5. Commune of Kinyinya
6. Commune of Nyabitsinda
7. Commune of Ruyigi

== See also ==
- Provinces of Burundi
- Collines of Burundi
