= Muhuta (commune) =

Commune of Muhuta
- Commune
- Location within Burundi
- Coordinates: 3.6157714°S 29.4042537°E
- Country: Burundi
- Time zone: UTC+2 (Central Africa Time)

Muhuta is a commune of Rumonge Province in Burundi.

In December 2023 heavy rains in the commune of Muhuta flooded hundreds of hectares of crop fields, causing landslides. A woman and her two children died when they were swept away by the Nyamusenyi stream. A week later their bodies were found in a pile of mud. Lightning injured people in the commune, social infrastructure was damaged and dozens of hectares of crop fields were damaged.

== See also ==
- Communes of Burundi

== Sources ==
- Nzorubonanya, Félix (9 December 2023), "Région Sud/Rumonge-Muhuta : Au moins 4 personnes sont mortes, une dizaine blessée", Iwacu
