= Ruyigi Province =

Province of Burundi

Coordinates: 3°31′47″S 30°17′31″E

Ruyigi Province Mkoa wa Ruyigi
- Province
- Country: Burundi
- Capital: Ruyigi

Area
  - Total: 2,338.88 km^{2} (903.05 sq mi)

Population (2008 census)
  - Total: 400,530
  - Density: 171.25/km^{2} (443.53/sq mi)

Ruyigi Province was one of the provinces of Burundi. In 2025, it was merged into the new province of Buhumuza.

== Location ==
Ruyigi Province was in the center of eastern Burundi, bordering Tanzania to the east. It was north of Rutana Province, east of Gitega Province, southeast of Karuzi Province and south of Cankuzo Province. The western part of Ruyigi Province is in the Buyogoma natural region and the eastern part in the Kumoso natural region.

== Communes ==
It was divided administratively into the following communes:

- Commune of Butaganzwa
- Commune of Butezi
- Commune of Bweru
- Commune of Gisuru
- Commune of Kinyinya
- Commune of Nyabitsinda
- Commune of Ruyigi

== Sources ==
- Atlas des quatre sites Ramsar: Localisation et Resources (PDF) (in French), Ministry of Water, Environment and Urbanism, October 2014
