= Rumonge Province =

Former province of Burundi

Coordinates: 3°58′S 29°26′E

Rumonge
- Province
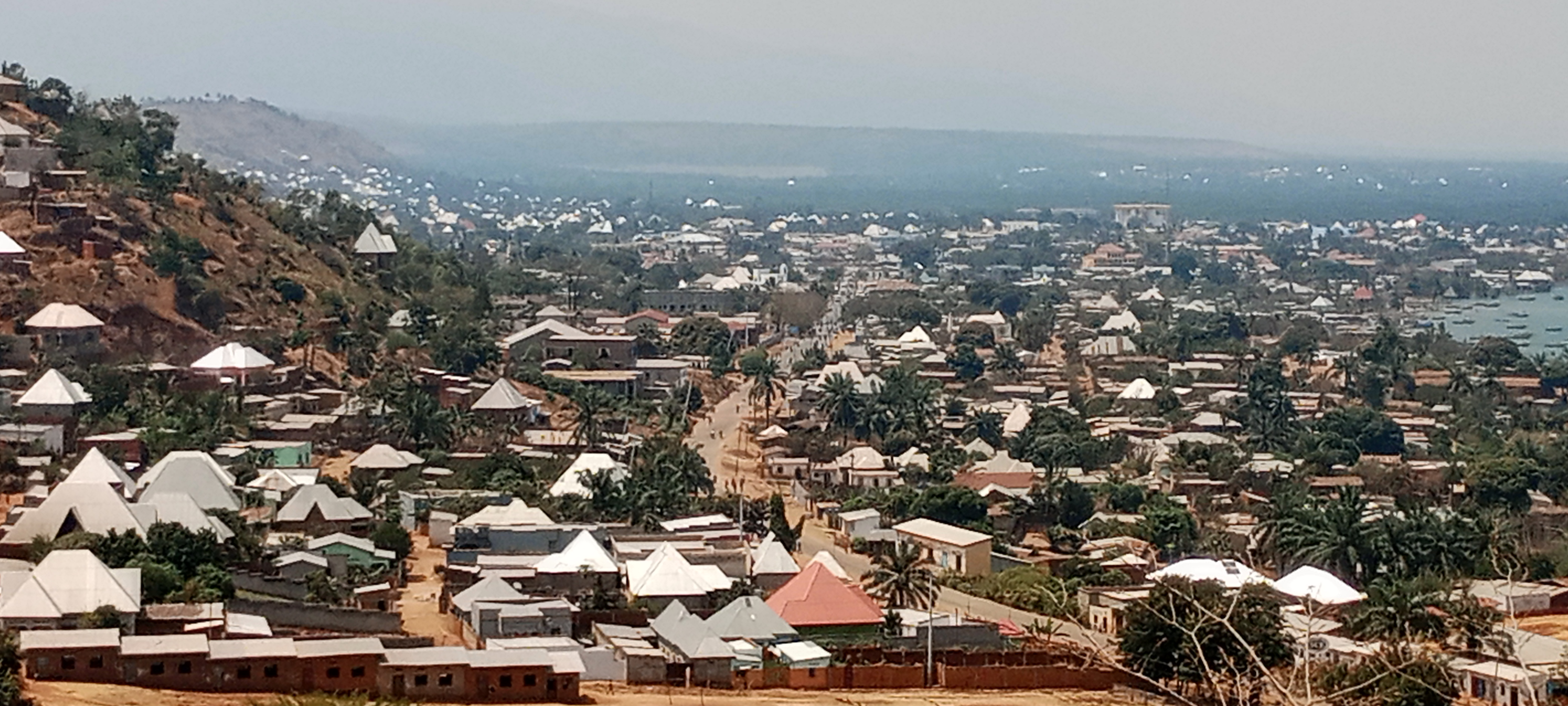
- The town of Rumonge

- Map of the former province of Rumonge in Burundi
- Country: Burundi
- Established: 2015
- Disestablished: 2025
- Capital: Rumonge

Area
  - Total: 1,079.72 km^{2} (416.88 sq mi)

Population (2008 census)
  - Total: 352,026
  - Density: 326.035/km^{2} (844.426/sq mi)
- Time zone: UTC+2 (CAT)

Rumonge was one of the provinces of Burundi. It was created on 26 March 2015 by combining the communes of Burambi, Buyengero and Rumonge, previously part of Bururi Province, with the Bugarama and Muhuta communes previously belonging to Bujumbura Rural Province. In 2025, it was divided between the new provinces of Burunga and Bujumbura. The communes of Burambi, Buyengero and Rumonge became part of Burunga, while the communes of Bugarama and Muhuta became part of the province of Bujumbura.

== Geography ==
The capital was at Rumonge, on the shores of Lake Tanganyika. The Rumonge Nature Reserve, a semi-deciduous forest, and Kigwena Nature Reserve, a lowland tropical forest, were located in the province.

== Government ==
The province's first governor, Juvénal Bigirimana, was sworn in on 17 April 2015. In June 2015 it elected four deputies to Burundi's National Assembly, and in July it chose its first two senators, Jean-Pierre Ndayahundwa and Tharcisse Rutomo.

Bigirimana was succeeded as the provincial governor by Consolateur Nitunga in 2020, and Léonard Niyonsaba in 2023.

== Communes ==
Rumonge Province administered the following communes:

- Commune of Bugarama
- Commune of Burambi
- Commune of Buyengero
- Commune of Muhuta
- Commune of Rumonge
