= Cankuzo Province =

Province of Burundi

Coordinates: 3°12′52″S 30°36′38″E

Cankuzo Province Mkoa wa Kankuzo
- province
- Country: Burundi
- Capital: Cankuzo

Government
  - Governor: Régine Katabarumwe (UPRONA)

Area
  - Total: 1,964.54 km^{2} (758.51 sq mi)
  - Rank: Ranked 4th

Population (2008 census)
  - Total: 228,873
  - Density: 116.502/km^{2} (301.739/sq mi)

Cankuzo was one of the provinces of Burundi. Located in the eastern part of the country, the province covered an area of 1,965 km^{2}. The provincial capital was Cankuzo. It was Burundi's least populated province. In 2025, it became part of the new province of Buhumuza.

== Location ==
Cankuzo Province was in the east of Burundi, bordered by Tanzania to the northeast and southeast. It was southeast of Muyinga Province, east of Karuzi Province and northeast of Ruyigi Province. The south east of Cankuzo Province is in the Kumoso natural region, and the rest of the province is in the Buyogoma natural region.

== Communes ==
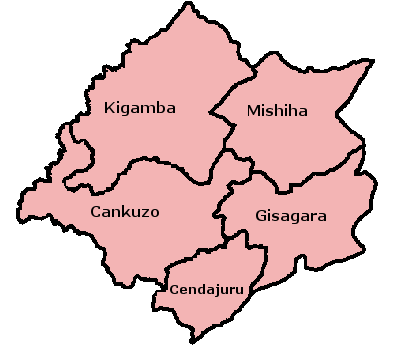
Cankuzo Province was divided into five communes; each governed by an elected 25-member council.

- Commune of Cankuzo
- Commune of Cendajuru
- Commune of Gisagara
- Commune of Kigamba
- Commune of Mishiha

== Politics ==
Direct Communal and National Assembly elections were held throughout Burundi on 3 June and 4 July 2005, respectively.

- In communal council elections, the National Council for the Defense of Democracy-Forces for the Defense of Democracy (CNDD- FDD) won a majority of the 125 seats followed by the Front for Democracy in Burundi (FRODEBU) and Union for National Progress (UPRONA). Smaller parties won the remaining seats.
- Cankuzo province has four deputies in the National Assembly. They are distributed as follows: CNDD-FDD – 2, FRODEBU – 1, UPRONA – 1.

== Sources ==
- Atlas des quatre sites Ramsar: Localisation et Resources (PDF) (in French), Ministry of Water, Environment and Urbanism, October 2014
