= Kayanza Province =

Province of Burundi

Coordinates: 2°55′S 29°37′E

- Province
- Country: Burundi
- Capital: Kayanza

Area
  - Total: 1,233.24 km^{2} (476.16 sq mi)

Population (2008 census)
  - Total: 585,412
  - Density: 474.694/km^{2} (1,229.45/sq mi)

Kayanza was one of the provinces of Burundi. Its capital city was also called Kayanza. In 2025, it was merged into the new province of Butanyerera.

== Location ==
Kayanza Province was in the center of northern Burundi, adjoining Rwanda to the north. It bordered Cibitoke Province and Bubanza Province to the west, Muramvya Province and Gitega Province to the south, and Ngozi Province to the east. The western part of Kayanza Province was in the Mugamba natural region, and the eastern part in the Buyenzi natural region. Some parts of the south were in the Kirimiro natural region.

== Communes ==
It was divided administratively into the following communes:

- Commune of Butaganzwa
- Commune of Gahombo
- Commune of Gatara
- Commune of Kabarore
- Commune of Kayanza
- Commune of Matongo
- Commune of Muhanga
- Commune of Muruta
- Commune of Rango

== Sources ==
- Atlas des quatre sites Ramsar: Localisation et Resources (PDF) (in French), Ministry of Water, Environment and Urbanism, October 2014
