= Muyinga Province =

Former province of Burundi

Coordinates: 2°49′25″S 30°19′25″E

- Province
- Country: Burundi
- Capital: Muyinga

Area
  - Total: 1,836.26 km^{2} (708.98 sq mi)

Population (2008 census)
  - Total: 632,409
  - Density: 344.401/km^{2} (891.993/sq mi)

Muyinga Province was one of the provinces of Burundi. In 2025, it was merged into the new province of Buhumuza.

== Location ==
Muyinga Province was in the northeast of Burundi, bordering Tanzania to the east and Rwanda to the north. It was south of Kirundo Province, east of Ngozi Province and north of Karuzi Province and Cankuzo Province. Muyinga Province was in the Bweru natural region apart from an area in the north that is in the Bugesera natural region.

== Communes ==
It was divided administratively into the following communes:

- Commune of Buhinyuza
- Commune of Butihinda
- Commune of Gashoho
- Commune of Gasorwe
- Commune of Giteranyi
- Commune of Muyinga
- Commune of Mwakiro

== Sources ==
- Atlas des quatre sites Ramsar: Localisation et Resources (PDF) (in French), Ministry of Water, Environment and Urbanism, October 2014
