= Muramvya Province =

Former province of Burundi

Coordinates: 3°15′15″S 29°37′43″E

- province
- Country: Burundi
- Capital: Muramvya

Area
  - Total: 695.52 km^{2} (268.54 sq mi)

Population (2008 census)
  - Total: 292,589
  - Density: 420.68/km^{2} (1,089.5/sq mi)

Muramvya Province was one of the provinces of Burundi. The capital city was Muramvya. In 2007 the province was added to the UNESCO World Heritage Tentative List. In 2025, the province was merged into the new Gitega Province.

== Location ==
Muramvya Province was in the center of western Burundi. It bordered Bubanza Province and Bujumbura Rural Province to the west, Mwaro Province to the south, Gitega Province to the east and Kayanza Province to the north. The eastern part of Muramvya Province was in the Mugamba natural region, and the western part was in the Kirimiro natural region.

== Culture ==
The area is renowned for the route of enthronement of the Bami (kings), the royal capital of Mbuye, the necropolis of the queen mothers in Mpotsa, and the royal necropolis of Nkiko-Mugamba, amongst other things.

== World Heritage status ==
The region's cultural and natural landscape was added to the UNESCO World Heritage Tentative List on May 9, 2007 in the Mixed (Cultural & Natural) category.

== Communes ==
Muramvya Province was divided administratively into the following communes:

- Commune of Bukeye
- Commune of Kiganda
- Commune of Mbuye
- Commune of Muramvya
- Commune of Rutegama

== Sources ==
- Atlas des quatre sites Ramsar: Localisation et Resources (PDF) (in French), Ministry of Water, Environment and Urbanism, October 2014
- Les paysages naturels sacrés de Muramvya, de Mpotsa et de Nkiko-Mugamba, UNESCO World Heritage Centre
