= Direction Generale de L'Hydraulique et de l'Electrification Rurales =

Hydraulic and Electric Scheme in Burundi

Direction Generale de L'Hydraulique et del'Electrification Rurales (DGHER) is a hydraulic and electricity scheme in Burundi. Also known as Direction Generale de l'Hydraulique et des Energies Rurales, the World Bank has been involved with the funding.
