= Karuzi Province =

Province of Burundi

Coordinates: 3°7′46″S 30°4′59″E

- Province
- Country: Burundi
- Capital: Karuzi

Area
  - Total: 1,457.40 km^{2} (562.71 sq mi)

Population (2008 census)
  - Total: 436,443
  - Density: 299.467/km^{2} (775.616/sq mi)

Karuzi Province was one of the provinces of Burundi. In 2025, it was merged into Gitega Province.

== Location ==
Karuzi Province was in the north-center of Burundi. Gitega Province and Ruyigi Province were to the south, Cankuzo Province to the east, and Muyinga Province and Ngozi Province to the north. A small part of the northwest was in the Buyenzi natural region, and a small part of the west was in the Kirimiro natural region. The northeast of the province was in the Bweru natural region and the southeast was in the Buyogoma natural region.

== Communes ==
It was divided administratively into the following communes:

- Commune of Bugenyuzi
- Commune of Buhiga
- Commune of Gihogazi
- Commune of Gitaramuka
- Commune of Mutumba
- Commune of Nyabikere
- Commune of Shombo

== Events ==
Six mass graves with 6,032 bodies were found by Burundi's Truth and Reconciliation Commission in Karuzi Province in January and February 2020. Some of the victims were identified by clothes and rosaries.

== Sources ==
- Atlas des quatre sites Ramsar: Localisation et Resources (PDF) (in French), Ministry of Water, Environment and Urbanism, October 2014
