= Gitega Province =

Province of Burundi

- Province
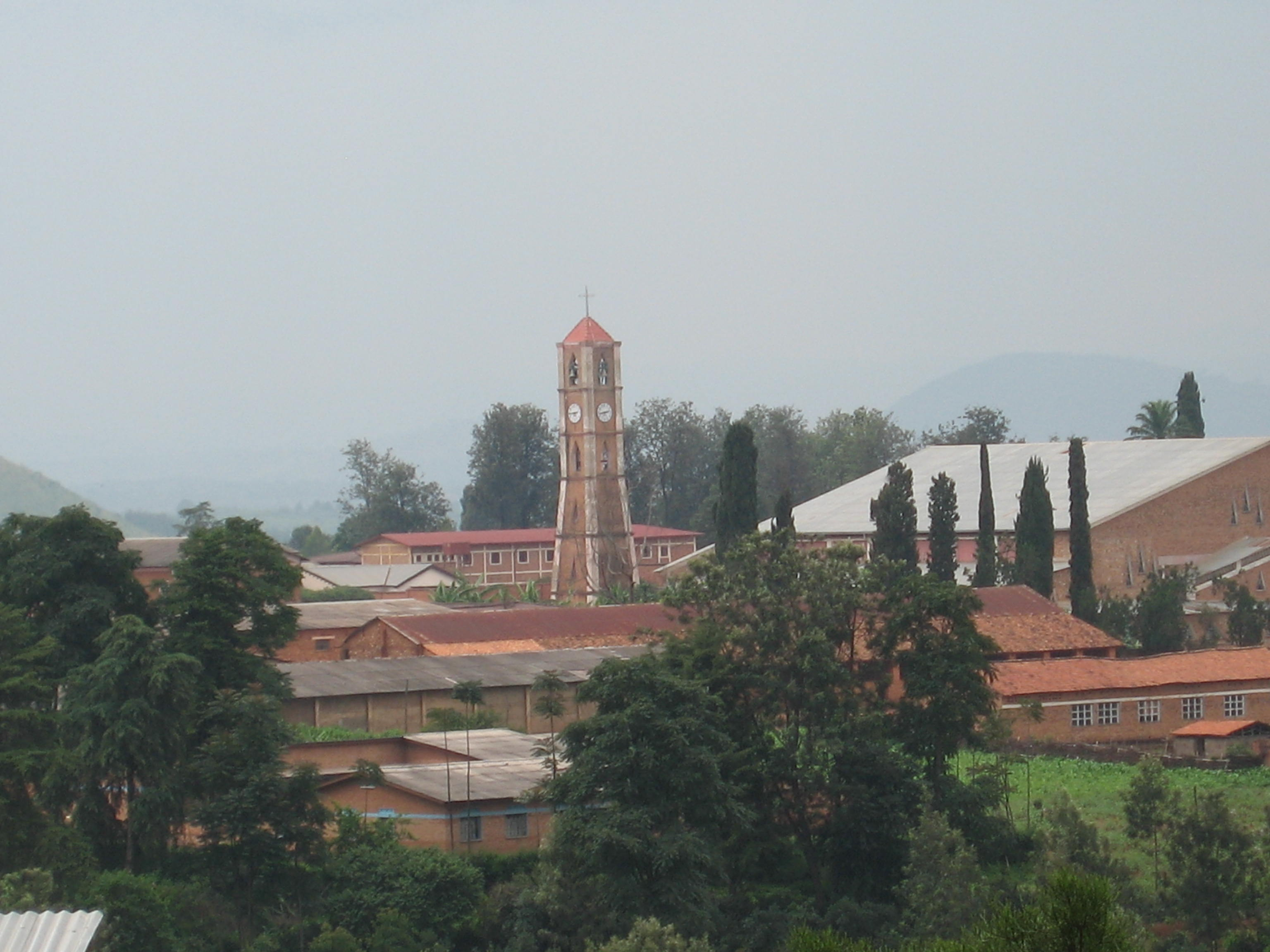
- View of Mushasha suburb in Gitega

- Map showing location of Gitega Province in Burundi
- Coordinates: 3°28′10″S 29°57′25″E
- Country: Burundi
- Capital: Gitega

Government
  - Governor: Liboire Bigirimana

Area
  - Total: 1,978.96 km^{2} (764.08 sq mi)

Population (2020 census)
  - Total: 1,100,000
  - Density: 560/km^{2} (1,400/sq mi)
- Time zones: UTC+01
- CET
- Communes: 11
- Website: https://provincegitega.gov.bi/

Gitega is one of the five provinces of Burundi. Its capital is Gitega, which is also the political capital of the country. It has a population of 725,223 as of 2008 and an area of 1,979 square kilometres (764 sq mi).

== History ==
Gitega Province before 2025

After Burundi attained full independence on 1 July 1962, there was a military coup d'état in which the king was overthrown and monarchy disbanded in 1966. When King Ntare V tried to reinstate his kingdom, he was assassinated in 1972 at the Royal Palace of Gitega.

On 26 April 1996, army attacks at Buhoro killed some 230 civilians. On 21 October, some 70 Tutsi students were burnt alive at Kibimba. In March 2007, President Pierre Nkurunziza announced that Burundi had plans to transfer the capital from Bujumbura to Gitega. According to him, the central location of the city makes it "an ideal place to better serve the majority of the population". The capital was moved on 24 December 2018.

== Geography ==
Gitega Province is located in central Burundi. It has an area of 1,979 square kilometres (764 sq mi) and has a population density of 366.5 individuals per square kilometre. Gitega is a central highland province along with Kayanza and Muramvya. It is south of Ngozi Province, east of Kayanza Province, Muramvya Province and Mwaro Province, north of Bururi Province and Rutana Province, west of Ruyigi Province and Karuzi Province, and south of Ngozi Province. Most of Gitega Province lies in the Kirimiro natural region. The extreme east is in the Buyogoma natural region.

=== Communes ===
Gitega Province is divided administratively into 11 communes:

- Commune of Bugendana
- Commune of Bukirasazi
- Commune of Buraza
- Commune of Giheta
- Commune of Gishubi
- Commune of Gitega
- Commune of Itaba
- Commune of Makebuko
- Commune of Mutaho
- Commune of Nyanrusange
- Commune of Ryansoro

== Demographics ==
Gitega Province is one of the seventeen provinces of Burundi and Gitega is its capital city. The province has a population of 725,223 and the Gitega Commune the largest population of 155,005; the least populous commune is Ryansoro with a population of 35,835. Gitega city had a population of 20,700 in 1990. As of June 2000, 21,350 people were located in internally displaced persons (IDP) camps, housed in 16 settlements within the province.

== Climate ==
The climatic condition in Gitega, the capital of the province is moderate with an average annual high of 18 degrees c 18 °C (64 °F) and a low of 12 °C (54 °F). The average annual rainfall is 720 millimetres (28 in).

Climate data for Gitega, Burundi (Average monthly temperature and precipitation)
Month	Jan	Feb	Mar	Apr	May	Jun	Jul	Aug	Sep	Oct	Nov	Dec	Year
Mean daily maximum °C (°F)	14 (57)	16 (61)	13 (55)	16 (61)	18 (64)	16 (61)	16 (61)	17 (63)	18 (64)	18 (64)	15 (59)	16 (61)	18 (64)
Mean daily minimum °C (°F)	13 (55)	13 (55)	12 (54)	14 (57)	14 (57)	12 (54)	12 (54)	12 (54)	14 (57)	14 (57)	13 (55)	13 (55)	12 (54)
Average precipitation mm (inches)	75 (3.0)	69 (2.7)	111 (4.4)	123 (4.8)	51 (2.0)	3 (0.1)	1 (0.0)	2 (0.1)	57 (2.2)	90 (3.5)	96 (3.8)	42 (1.7)	720 (28.3)

== Economy ==
Burundi is diversifying from the main economic activities of agriculture and livestock farming. One such microproject is in the fisheries sector in Gitega. In 1999, the Dushirehamwe fish farm association was established in the province with 23 men and women. In 2002, they received a grant from Africare. After the success of the first fish farm under the grant, the association successfully launched a second project with its own funds in 2003. Africare has also supported measures to strengthen civil society organizations. While the principal hospital in the province is Gitega Hospital in Gitega City, the only state-run rehabilitation center for landmine victims is located in the province. The principal airport is Gitega Airport (IATA: GID, ICAO: HBBE) which has an elevation of 1,750 metres (5,740 ft) with a runway of 1,000 metres (3,300 ft).

== Religion ==
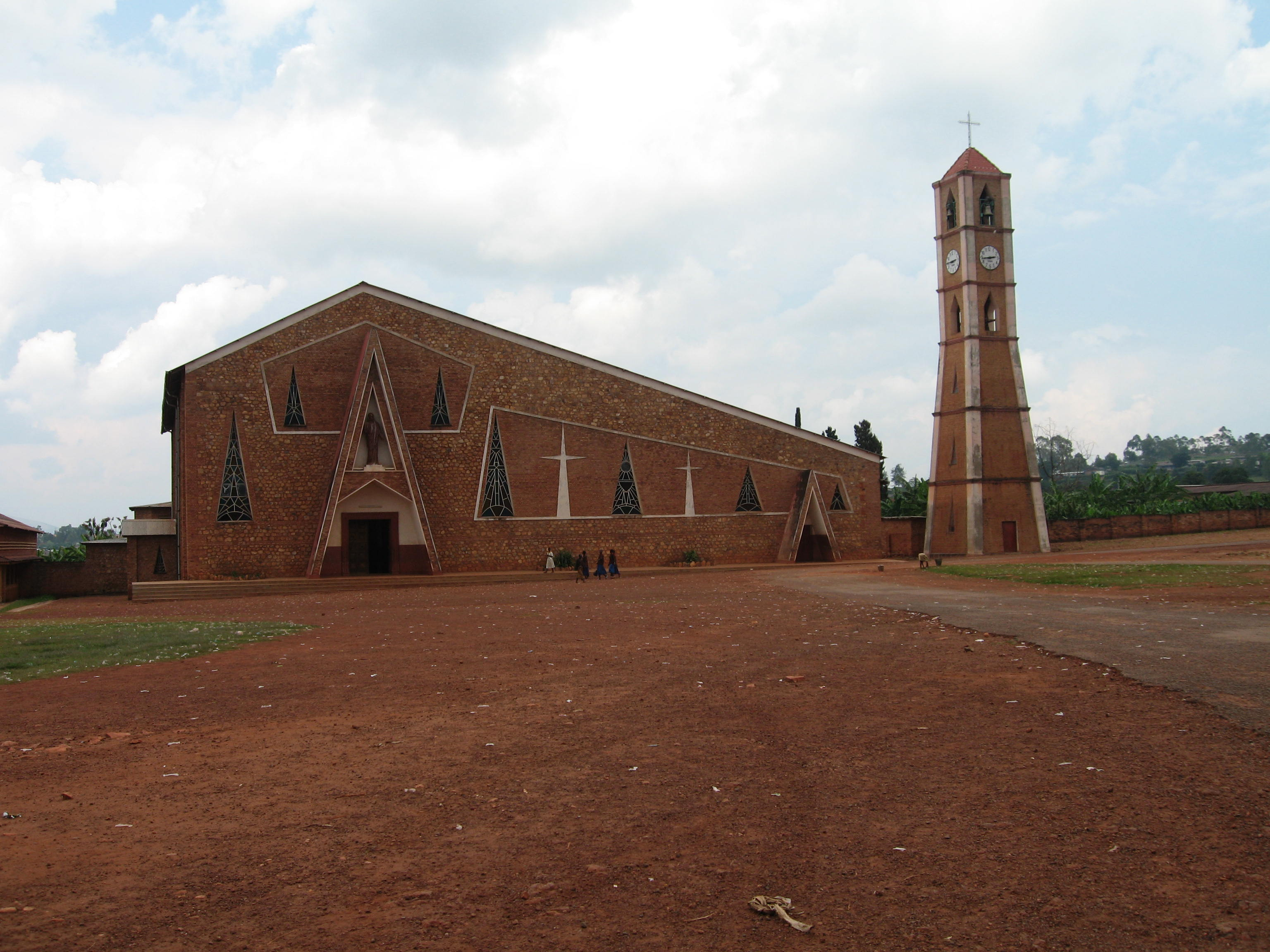
Cathedral of Christ the King in the Mushasha sector of Gitega.

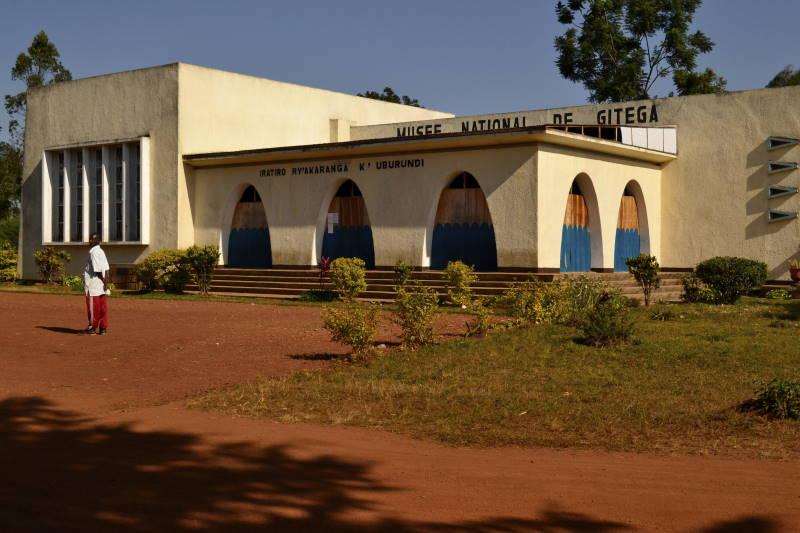
Burundi National Museum

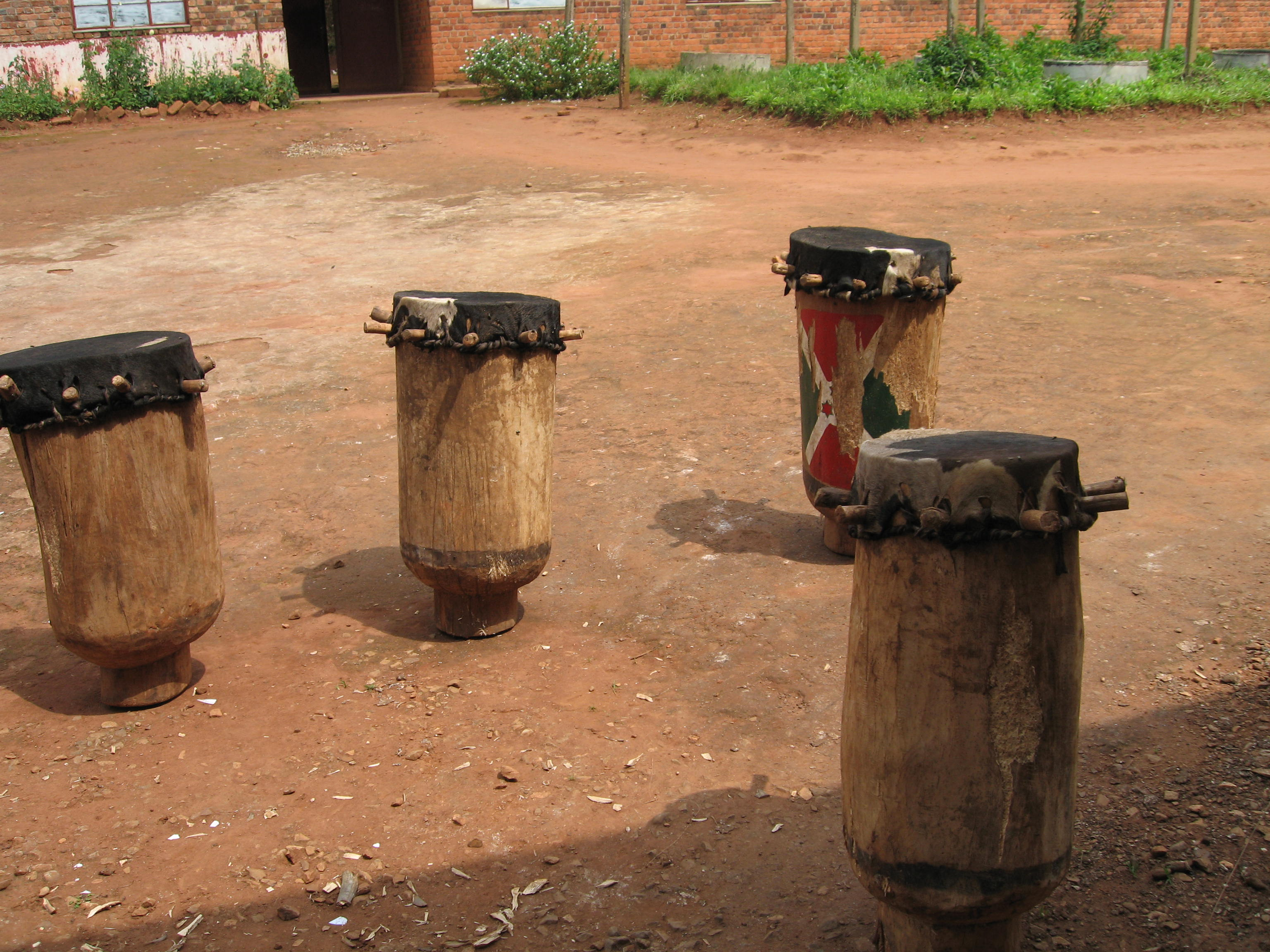
Gitega drums in the sanctuaries.

Mushasha is the seat of the Catholic archbishop. The Archdiocese of Gitega, the Metropolitan See for the ecclesiastical province of Gitega, was established in 1959. It has jurisdiction over an area of 1,498 square miles (3,880 km^{2}). Approximately 77 percent out of the total population in the province belongs to the diocese.

== Landmarks ==
Some of the landmarks in the province are the national museum and drum sanctuaries. Burundi National Museum was established in 1955. It consists of two distinct areas, the traditional museum building and the drummers' sanctuary. Exhibits consist of drums, dance and musical instruments, baskets, calabashes weaponry, and tools used in sorcery. It also houses ancient Burundian dresses and a large library.

The royal palace is located on a hill top 45 miles away from Gitega; it contains a traditional art museum. It is located within the military camp where the King Ntare V was incarcerated. The drum sanctuary is in the precincts of the royal palace. It houses ancient drums and drum making tools, and offers exhibitions with dance and music programmes for the public. The sanctuary's objective is to preserve and popularize the Burundian culture particularly the role of the drum in its history. Of the two personal drums of the king, one is in the sanctuary and the other is preserved in the museum. Dancers performed with these drums for the king. This sanctuary was refurbished in 1988. The rukinzo drum used to be part of the king's entourage.

Also in the province are a craftwares village and the Gitega Art School of ceramics, paintings and sculptures. There is also an artistic centre where ceramics, leather and wood carvings are made. The Chutes de la Kalera, close to Rutana, is a natural scenic attraction during the rainy season.

== Sources ==
- Atlas des quatre sites Ramsar: Localisation et Resources (PDF) (in French), Ministry of Water, Environment and Urbanism, October 2014

Bibliography

- Campbell, Penelope (25 September 2012). Africare: Black American Philanthropy in Africa. Transaction Publishers. ISBN 978-1-4128-4638-7.
- Human Rights Watch (2004). Landmine Monitor Report. Human Rights Watch. ISBN 978-1-56432-327-9.
- Lemarchand, Rene (19 November 2009). The Dynamics of Violence in Central Africa. University of Pennsylvania Press. ISBN 978-0-8122-2090-2.
- Smallman-Raynor, Matthew; Cliff, Andrew (17 June 2004). War Epidemics : An Historical Geography of Infectious Diseases in Military Conflict and Civil Strife, 1850–2000: An Historical Geography of Infectious Diseases in Military Conflict and Civil Strife, 1850–2000. OUP Oxford. ISBN 978-0-19-151345-9.
- Vincet, Marc; Sorenson, Birgitte Refslund (20 October 2001). Caught Between Borders: Response Strategies of the Internally Displaced. Pluto Press. ISBN 978-0-7453-1818-9.
- Watt, Nigel (2008). Burundi: The Biography of a Small African Country. C. Hurst, Publishers, Limited. ISBN 978-1-85065-917-4.
