= Bururi =

- City
- Location in the Burundi
- Coordinates: 3°57′S 29°37′E
- Country: Burundi
- Province: Bururi Province
- Elevation: 1,836 m (6,024 ft)

Population (2012)
  - Total: 20,764

Bururi is a city located in southern Burundi. It is the capital city of Bururi Province and has around 20,000 inhabitants in 2007.

== History ==
On 29 April 1972, a massacre took place here. Local Hutu gendarmes in Bururi drove out military and civil government control of the Tutsi military regime of Micombero. A republic was declared, and a week later suppressed by Burundian troops.
