= Bururi Province =

Province of Burundi

Coordinates: 3°53′49″S 29°34′40″E

- Province
- Country: Burundi
- Capital: Bururi

Area
  - Total: 2,456.12 km^{2} (948.31 sq mi)

Population (2008 census)
  - Total: 574,013
  - Density: 233.707/km^{2} (605.299/sq mi)

Bururi was one of the provinces of Burundi. It was formerly Burundi's largest province until the communes of Burambi, Buyengero and Rumonge were transferred to the province of Rumonge when it was created in 2015. In 2025, Bururi was merged into the new province of Burunga.

== Location ==
Bururi Province was in the southeast of Burundi. It looked over Lake Tanganyika to the west. It was south of Bujumbura Rural Province and Mwaro Province, west of Gitega Province and Rutana Province, and north of Makamba Province. The west coastal strip was in the Imbo natural region. Further inland it covered part of the Mumirwa natural region, Mugamba natural region and Bututsi natural region.

== Overview ==
Bururi Province was created on 26 September 1960 as part of national political and administrative reforms initiated by the Belgian colonial administration in Ruanda-Urundi. Burundi became independent in 1962 and the province was retained in the new national constitution.

The provincial capital was Bururi. Bururi Province was home to the Bururi Forest Nature Reserve, a remnant Afromontane tropical forest. The Ruvyironza River, which was in Bururi Province, is the southernmost source of the Nile.

Bururi was famous for the number of military and political leaders to have been born there, including three consecutive presidents (Michel Micombero, Jean-Baptiste Bagaza and Pierre Buyoya) following the country's independence.

== Communes ==
It is divided administratively into the following communes:

- Commune of Bururi
- Commune of Matana
- Commune of Mugamba
- Commune of Rutovu
- Commune of Songa
- Commune of Vyanda

== Sources ==
- Atlas des quatre sites Ramsar: Localisation et Resources (PDF) (in French), Ministry of Water, Environment and Urbanism, October 2014
