= Bujumbura Rural Province =

Former province of Burundi

Coordinates: 3°22′44″S 29°25′36″E

- Province
- Country: Burundi
- Capital: Isale

Area
  - Total: 1,319.12 km^{2} (509.32 sq mi)

Population (2020)
  - Total: 730,000
  - Density: 550/km^{2} (1,400/sq mi)
- Time zone: UTC+2 (CAT)

Bujumbura Rural Province was one of the provinces of Burundi. It surrounded the former national capital Bujumbura and its provincial capital was Isale. In 2025, the province was merged into the new Bujumbura Province.

== Location ==
Bujumbura Rural Province was in the east of Burundi, to the east and north of Lake Tanganyika. In the northeast it bordered the Democratic Republic of the Congo. To the north it bordered Bubanza Province, to east it bordered Muramvya Province and Mwaro Province, and to the south it bordered Bururi Province. It enclosed Bujumbura Mairie Province around the northwest corner of Lake Tanganyika. In the west it was in the Imbo natural region. The center was in the Mumirwa natural region and the east was in the Mugamba natural region.

== Communes ==
Bujumbura Rural Province administered nine communes:

- Commune of Isale
- Commune of Kabezi
- Commune of Kanyosha
- Commune of Mubimbi
- Commune of Mugongomanga
- Commune of Mukike
- Commune of Mutambu
- Commune of Mutimbuzi
- Commune of Nyabiraba

== Sources ==
- Atlas des quatre sites Ramsar: Localisation et Resources (PDF) (in French), Ministry of Water, Environment and Urbanism, October 2014
