= Provinces of Burundi =

Burundi is divided into five provinces: Buhumuza, Bujumbura, Burunga, Butanyerera, and Gitega. Prior to 2025, there were 18 provinces.

== History ==
The Belgian colonial administration created provinces in Burundi on 26 September 1960, to replace chiefdoms as part of a series of administrative reforms. There were 18: Bubanza, Bukirasazi, Bururi, Cankuzo, Cibitoke, Karuzi, Kayanza, Kitega, Kirundo, Makamba, Muhinga, Muramvya, Mwaro, Mwisale, Ngozi, Ruyigi, Rutana, and Usumbura. The 1962 constitution of the Kingdom of Burundi provided for eight provinces: Bubanza, Bukirasazi, Bururi, Gitega, Muramvya, Muyinga, Ngozi, and Ruyigi.

In 2000, the province encompassing Bujumbura was separated into two provinces, Bujumbura Rural and Bujumbura Mairie. The newest province, Rumonge, was created on 26 March 2015 from portions of Bujumbura Rural and Bururi.

In July 2022, the government of Burundi announced a complete overhaul of the country's territorial subdivisions. The proposed change would reduce the number of provinces from 18 to 5, and the number of communes from 119 to 42. The changes were approved by both the National Assembly and the Senate and took effect in 2025 with the new parliamentary elections.

With the new administrative division, the country is now made up of 5 provinces: Buhumuza, Bujumbura, Burunga, Butanyerera and Gitega. These provinces are further subdivided into 42 communes, 451 zones and 3044 hills (or districts)

== Provinces ==
=== Current provinces ===
Map of the provinces of Burundi as of 2025.

As of July 2025, Burundi has five provinces, each with its own governor.

Province	Capital	Population (2024 census)	Area (km^{2})	Territorial correspondence with former provinces	Governor as of 2025
Buhumuza	Cankuzo	2.052.261	5.931	Cankuzo, Muyinga, Ruyigi	Dénise Ndaruhekeye
Bujumbura	Bujumbura	3.353.555	3.937	Bubanza, Bujumbura Mairie, Bujumbura Rural, Cibitoke, and parts of Rumonge and Muramvya	Aloys Ndayikengurukiye
Burunga	Makamba	2.118.551	6.206	Bururi, Makamba, Rutana, three communes in Rumonge, and the zone of Mahwa in Gitega	Parfait Mboninyibuka
Butanyerera	Ngozi	2.530.206	4.480	Kayanza, Kirundo, Ngozi, and parts of Muramvya	Victor Segasago
Gitega	Gitega	2.278.215	4.546	Gitega minus the zone of Mahwa, Karuzi, Mwaro, and parts of Muramvya	Liboire Bigirimana

=== Former provinces (2015–2025) ===
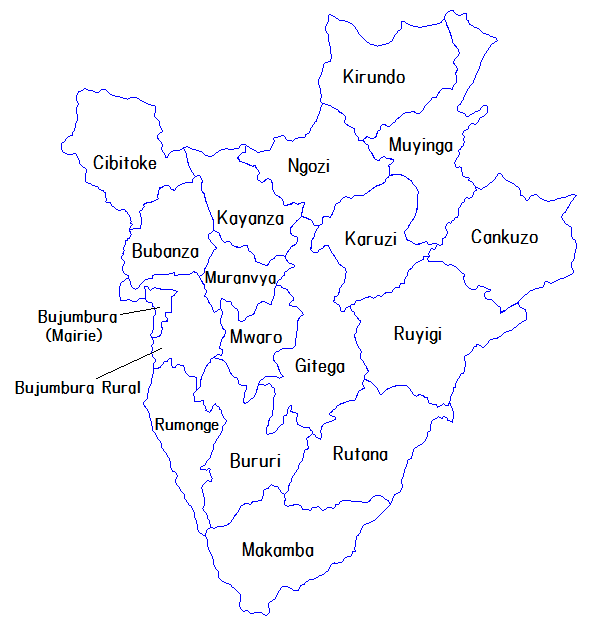
Map of the provinces of Burundi as they existed from 2015 to 2025.

Province	Capital	Area (km^{2})	Population (2008 census)	Density (per km^{2})	Communes
Bubanza	Bubanza	1,089.04	338,023	310.4	5
Bujumbura Mairie	Bujumbura	86.52	497,166	5746.3	13
Bujumbura Rural	Isale	1,059.84	464,818	438.6	9
Bururi	Bururi	1,644.68	313,102	190.4	6
Cankuzo	Cankuzo	1,964.54	228,873	116.5	5
Cibitoke	Cibitoke	1,635.53	460,435	281.5	6
Gitega	Gitega	1,978.96	725,223	366.5	11
Karuzi	Karuzi	1,457.40	436,443	299.5	7
Kayanza	Kayanza	1,233.24	585,412	474.7	9
Kirundo	Kirundo	1,703.34	628,256	368.8	7
Makamba	Makamba	1,959.60	430,899	219.9	6
Muramvya	Muramvya	695.52	292,589	420.7	5
Muyinga	Muyinga	1,836.26	632,409	344.4	7
Mwaro	Mwaro	839.60	273,143	325.3	6
Ngozi	Ngozi	1,473.86	660,717	448.3	9
Rumonge	Rumonge	1,079.72	352,026	326.0	5
Rutana	Rutana	1,959.45	333,510	170.2	6
Ruyigi	Ruyigi	2,338.88	400,530	171.2	7

== See also ==
- Communes of Burundi
- Collines of Burundi
- Geography of Burundi
- List of Burundian provinces by area
- List of Burundian provinces by population
- List of Burundian provincial governors
- ISO 3166-2:BI

== Works cited ==
- Weinstein, Warren (1976). Historical Dictionary of Burundi. Metuchen: Scarecrow Press. ISBN 978-0-8108-0962-8.
