= List of power stations in Burundi =

Power stations in Burundi

This article lists all power stations in Burundi.

== Hydroelectric ==
Hydroelectric station	Province	Coordinates	Type	River	Capacity	Year completed	Ref
Mugere Power Station	Bujumbura (in former Bujumbura Rural)	3°29′S 29°24′E	Run-of-the-river	Mugere River	8 MW	1982	
Gikonge Power Station	Gitega (in former Muramvya)	3°15′S 29°39′E	Run-of-the-river	Mubarazi River	1 MW	1982	
Ruvyironza Power Station	Gitega	3°20′S 29°59′E	Run-of-the-river	Ruvyironza River	1.5 MW	1984	
Upper Ruvyironza Power Station	Gitega		Run-of-the-river	Ruvyironza River	1.65 MW	April 2025	Built by Songa Energy, a subsidiarie of Anzana Electric Group
Kayenzi Power Station	Buhumuza (in former Muyinga)	2.88814°S 30.38803°E	Run-of-the-river	Kavuruga River	0.8 MW	1984	
Buhiga Power Station	Gitega (in former Karuzi)	3°2′S 30°09′E	Run-of-the-river	Ndurumu River (Ruvubu)	0.47 MW	1984	
Rwegura Power Station	Bujumbura (in former Cibitoke)	2°56′S 29°27′E	Reservoir	Kitenge River	18 MW	1986	
Marangara Power Station	Butanyerera (in former Ngozi)	2.73035°S 29.964927°E	Run-of-the-river	Ndurumu River (Akanyaru)	0.26 MW	1986	
Nyemanga Hydroelectric Power Station	Burunga (in former Bururi)	3°57′S 29°34′E	Run-of-the-river	Siguvyaye River	2.8 MW	1988	
Nyamyotsi Power Station	Gitega (in former Mwaro)	3.32917°S 29.777346°E	Run-of-the-river	Kaniga River	0.3 MW	2018	
Kabu 16 Power Station	Bujumbura (in former Cibitoke)	2°55′S 29°15′E	Run-of-the-river	Kaburantwa River	20 MW	2024	
Ruzibazi Hydroelectric Power Station	Burunga (in former Rumonge)	3.72346°S 29.36172°E	Run-of-the-river	Ruzibazi River	15 MW	2022	
Kirasa Hydroelectric Power Station	Bujumbura (in former Bujumbura Rural)	3.5947°S 29.3531°E	Run-of-the-river	Kirasa River	16 MW	2022 (expected)	
Jiji Power Station	Burunga (in former Bururi)	3.887334°S 29.56518°E	Run-of-the-river	Jiji River	32.5 MW	26 June 2025	
Murembwe Power Station	Burunga (in former Bururi)	3.845998°S 29.575877°E	Run-of-the-river	Murembwe River	17.5 MW	16 June 2026	
Upper Murembwe Hydroelectric Power Station	Burunga (in former Bururi)		Run-of-the-river	Murembwe River	9 MW	Under construction	Built by Songa Energy, a subsidiarie of Anzana Electric Group
Mpanda Power Station	Bujumbura (in former Bubanza)		Run-of-the-river	Mpanda River	10.2 MW	Planned	
SIKU 011 Power Station	Burunga		Run-of-the-river	Siguvyaye River	12.4 MW	Planned	
DAMA 015 Power Station	Burunga		Run-of-the-river	Dama River	9.8 MW	Planned	

Burundi also has various power stations that are jointly owned by corporations in Burundi and neighboring countries.

Hydroelectric station	Partner nations	Coordinates	Type	River	Capacity	Burundi capacity share	Year completed	Ref
Ruzizi II Power Station	Burundi, DRC, Rwanda	2°37′S 28°54′E	Run-of-the-river	Ruzizi River	36 MW	12 MW	1989	
Rusumo Power Station	Burundi, Rwanda, Tanzania	2°22′S 30°47′E	Run-of-the-river	Kagera River	80 MW	26.4 MW	2024	
Ruzizi III Power Station	Burundi, DRC, Rwanda		Run-of-the-river	Ruzizi River	147 MW		2027 (expected)	
Ruzizi IV Power Station	Burundi, DRC, Rwanda		Run-of-the-river	Ruzizi River	287 MW		2030 (expected)	

Ruzizi I is owned and operated by Société Nationale d'Électricité (SNEL) of DRC, which sells electricity into Burundi's grid. Despite having a contractual agreement, the electricity is considered an import.

== Thermal ==
Thermal power station	Province	Coordinates	Fuel type	Capacity	Operator	Year completed	Ref
Bujumbura Thermal Power Station	Bujumbura		Diesel	5.5 MW	REGIDESO	1999	
Interpetrol Power Station	Bujumbura		Diesel	45 MW	Interpetrol Burundi	2017	

== Solar ==
Solar power station	Province	Coordinates	Technology	Capacity	Operator	Year completed	Ref
Mubuga Solar Power Station	Gitega	03°22′29″S 29°59′14″E	PV	7.5MW	Gigawatt Global	2021	
Ruyigi Solar Power Station	Buhumuza		PV	500MW	EnSmart International Limited	Planned	

== See also ==
- REGIDESO Burundi, the national power company
- Jiji and Murembwe Hydroelectric Project
- List of rivers of Burundi
- List of power stations in Africa
- List of largest power stations in the world
