= Kavuruga River =

River in Burundi

- Location within Burundi
- Native name: Rivière Kavuruga (French)

Location
- Country: Burundi
- Province: Muyinga Province

Physical characteristics
- Mouth: Ruvubu River
  - coordinates: 2.86178°S 30.40586°E

The Kavuruga River (French: Rivière Kavuruga) is a river in Muyinga Province, Burundi. It is a left tributary of the Ruvubu River.

== Course ==
The Kavuruga River forms at 1,427 metres (4,682 ft) elevation. where the Nyabihongo and Mugatama rivers, on either side of the Rugazi colline, converge to the west of Muramba in Karuzi Province. It flows in a winding course north of northeast through Muyinga Province to the Kavuruga Dam, then a short distance to its mouth on the Ruvubu River.

The Kavuruga receives the Kwagatabo and Kibwirwa from the left (west), the Rusabagi, Gasarara (1,399 metres (4,590 ft)) and Ntawuntunze (1,389 metres (4,557 ft)) from the right (east), the Gahomoka from the left, the Nyarumasni from the right, the Kinyamaganda and Kagare from the left. It enters the Ruvubu at around 1,343 metres (4,406 ft). As of 2014 the lower river flowed through a 40 hectares (99 acres) undeveloped marsh.

== Environment ==
The surroundings of Kavuruga are a mosaic of agricultural land and natural vegetation. The area is quite densely populated, with 214 inhabitants per square kilometer as of 2016. The average annual temperature in the area is 20 °C (68 °F). The warmest month is September, when the average temperature is 24 °C (75 °F), and the coldest is March, with 18 °C (64 °F). Average annual rainfall is 1,170 millimetres (46 in). The wettest month is March, with an average of 178 millimetres (7.0 in) of precipitation, and the driest is July, with 1 millimetre (0.039 in) of precipitation.

== Power Station ==
The 0.85 MW Kayenzi Hydroelectric Power Station produces 1.3 MWh of power annually. It was implemented in 1984 and is operated by REGIDESO Burundi. It was designed to supply electricity to the Muyinga and Cankuzo urban centers. The power station receives water from the Kavuruga dam, which was built with the assistance of the Federal Republic of Germany. The reservoir is between the Nkoyoyo and Kayenzi collines.

In 2009 REGIDESO Burundi, the water and electricity authority, announced bids to rehabilitate five hydroelectric plants and to improve the network in Bujumbura. The plants were the 18 MW Rwegura plant on the Gitenge River; 1.44 MW Nyemanga on the Siguvyaye River; 850 kW Kayenzi on the Kavuruga River; 240 kW Marangara on the Ndurumu River; and 72 kW Sanzu on the Sanzu River.

== See also ==
- List of rivers of Burundi

== Sources ==
- "Five Hydros Go to Rehab in Burundi", Alternative Energy Africa, 30 June 2009
- "Muyinga : les alentours du barrage de la Kavuruga reboisés", Iwacu (in French), 5 June 2013
- NASA Earth Observations: Population Density, NASA/SEDAC, archived from the original on 9 February 2016
- NASA Earth Observations Data Set Index, NASA, archived from the original on 28 November 2017 Temperature data from satellite measurements of the earth's surface temperature within a box that is 0.1x01. degrees.
- NASA Earth Observations: Rainfall (1 month - TRMM), NASA/Tropical Rainfall Monitoring Mission, archived from the original on 19 April 2019 Average value for the years 2012–2014 within a box that is 0.1x01. degrees.
- NASA Earth Observations: Land Cover Classification, NASA/MODIS, archived from the original on 28 February 2016
- Strategie nationale de developpement de la filiere riz au Burundi (PDF) (in French), Bujumbura: Ministry of Agriculture and Livestock, 2014
- U.S. Defense Mapping Agency (1994), Buhinyuza (PDF), University of Texas at Austin
- U.S. Defense Mapping Agency (1994), Muyinga (PDF), University of Texas at Austin
- "Way: Kavuruga (313253519)", OpenStreetMap
- World Small Hydropower Development Report 2016 (PDF), United Nations Industrial Development Organization, 2016
