= Kayenzi Hydroelectric Power Station =

Power station in Burundi

- Location within Burundi
- Official name: French: Centrale Hydroélectrique de Kayenzi
- Country: Burundi
- Location: Muyinga Province
- Coordinates: 2.88814°S 30.38803°E
- Purpose: Power
- Owner: REGIDESO Burundi

Power Station
- Installed capacity: 0.8 megawatts (1,100 hp)

Ruvyironza Hydroelectric Power Station (French: Centrale Hydroélectrique de Kayenzi) is an 0.8 megawatts (1,100 hp) run-of-the-river hydroelectric power station in the Muyinga Province of Burundi.

== Location ==
The 0.85 MW Kayenzi power station produces 1.3 MWh of power annually. It was implemented in 1984 and is operated by REGIDESO Burundi. It was designed to supply electricity to the Muyinga and Cankuzo urban centers.

The power station receives water from the Kavuruga dam, which impounds rivers of the Gasenyi, Muhongo, Rusabagi and Gitaramuka areas. The dam was built with the assistance of the Federal Republic of Germany. The reservoir is between the Nkoyoyo and Kayenzi collines. The Kavuruga River runs northeast for a short distance from the dam to the Rurubu River on the Burundi-Tanzania border.

== History ==
In 2007 it was expected that the Marangara (280 kW), Buhiga (240 kW) and Kayenzi (800 kW) power plants would soon by connected to the national grid through the Musasa substation, which would be connected by a 30 kV line to the Ngozi substation. The project was financed by the Programme de réhabilitation du Burundi (PREBU).

In 2009 REGIDESO Burundi, the water and electricity authority, announced bids to rehabilitate five hydroelectric plants and to improve the network in Bujumbura. The plants were the 18 MW Rwegura plant on the Gitenge River; 1.44 MW Nyemanga on the Siguvyaye River; 850 kW Kayenzi on the Kavuruga; 240 kW Marangara on the Ndurumu River; and 72 kW Sanzu on the Sanzu River.

When built, the water level of the reservoir reached 8 metres (26 ft) in the rainy season. As of 2013 it did not exceed 5 metres (16 ft) due to deforestation. That year the Anglican Church, helped by the Christian Aid NGO, planted 40,000 agroforestry plants in the surrounding area.

== See also ==
- List of power stations in Burundi

== Sources ==
- "Five Hydros Go to Rehab in Burundi", Alternative Energy Africa, 30 June 2009
- "Muyinga : les alentours du barrage de la Kavuruga reboisés", Iwacu (in French), 5 June 2013
- Study on the interconnection of the electricity networks of the Nile equatorial lakes countries (PDF), vol. 1 – Power supply and demand analysis, NELSAP, October 2007
- "Way: Kavuruga (313253519)", OpenStreetMap
- World Small Hydropower Development Report 2016 (PDF), United Nations Industrial Development Organization, 2016
