= Nyemanga Hydroelectric Power Station =

Power station in Burundi

- Location within Burundi
- Official name: French: Centrale Hydroélectrique de Nyemanga
- Country: Burundi
- Location: Bururi Province
- Coordinates: 3.95992°S 29.56809°E
- Purpose: Power
- Owner: REGIDESO Burundi

Dam and spillways
- Impounds: Siguvyaye River

Power Station
- Installed capacity: 2.88 megawatts (3,860 hp)
- Annual generation: 24.4 GWh

Nyemanga Hydroelectric Power Station (French: Centrale Hydroélectrique du Nyemanga) is an 1.44 megawatts (1,930 hp) run-of-the-river hydroelectric power station in the Bururi Province of Burundi.

== History ==
Nyemanga began operation in 1988. It is connected to the southern grid. As of 1992 Nyemanga had capacity of 1.4 MW, with the potential to expand to 2.8 MW as demand grew in the southern grid.

In 2009 REGIDESO Burundi, the water and electricity authority, announced bids to rehabilitate five hydroelectric plants and to improve the network in Bujumbura. The plants were the 18 MW Rwegura plant on the Gitenge River; 1.44 MW Nyemanga on the Siguvyaye River; 850 kW Kayenzi on the Kavuruga River; 240 kW Marangara on the Ndurumu River; and 72 kW Sanzu on the Sanzu River.

As of 2013 the Nyemanga plant generated about 2.9 MW, with annual output of 24.4 GWh.

== See also ==
- List of power stations in Burundi

== Sources ==
- African leap, NS Energy, 16 May 2013
- Burundi. Issues and options in the energy sector (PDF), World Bank, January 1992
- "Five Hydros Go to Rehab in Burundi", Alternative Energy Africa, 30 June 2009
