= Jiji Hydroelectric Power Station =

Power station in Burundi

Jiji Hydroelectric Power Plant
- Location within Burundi
- Official name: French: Centrale Hydroélectrique de Jiji
- Country: Burundi
- Coordinates: 3.887334°S 29.56518°E
- Purpose: Power
- Status: Operational
- Opening date: 24 June 2025
- Owner: Government of Burundi
- Operator: REGIDESO Burundi

Dam and spillways
- Impounds: Jiji River

Power Station
- Installed capacity: 32.5 megawatts (43,600 hp)

The Jiji Hydroelectric Power Plant (French: Centrale Hydroélectrique de Jiji) is a hydroelectric power station built in Burunga Province, in what is the former Bururi Province of Burundi. It was officially inaugurated par President Évariste Ndayishimiye on 24 June 2025.

== Location ==
The Jiji Hydroelectric Power Plant is a run-of the river hydroelectric power plant in the Songa Commune of Bururi Province in southern Burundi. It is on the Jiji River, near the point where the Jiji River joins the Murembwe River. The Jiji dam is upstream, directing water along a supply conduit to a tunnel which leads to the forebay. From there a penstock carries the water down to the power station.

The power station was built as part of the Jiji and Murembwe Hydroelectric Project. It is owned and operated by REGIDESO Burundi, part of the Ministry of Hydraulics, Energy and Mines.

== Technical ==
The Jiji Hydroelectric Power Plant exploits a head height of 434 metres (1,424 ft) with a capacity of 32.5 MW. The Jiji dam is upstream, and creates a water storage reservoir. Water is routed from this reservoir through a grit trap to remove solid matter, then through a 1,100 metres (3,600 ft) tunnel to the head of the penstock. From the forebay the penstock carries the water down to the power station.

A 110 kV power line runs 5.5 kilometres (3.4 mi) north from the Jiji station up the Mulembwe River to the Murembwe Hydroelectric Power Plant, where it is joined by a 110 kV power line from that station. The two lines run east 2.3 kilometres (1.4 mi) to the Horezo switchyard on RP 403 highway. From there, lines run north towards Kabezi and Bujumbura, and southeast towards Bururi.

== See also ==
- List of power stations in Burundi

== Sources ==
- Faller, Tanja (2014), Projet de developpement des centrales hydroelectriques de Jiji et Mulembwe (PDF), African Development Bank
- Jiji-Mulembwe: Pas à pas vers l’objectif (in French), Regideso, 24 June 2023
- Projet Hydroélectrique Jiji et Murembwe (in French), REGIDESO
