= Nyamyotsi Hydroelectric Power Station =

Power station in Burundi

- Location within Burundi
- Official name: French: Centrale Hydroélectrique de Nyamyotsi
- Country: Burundi
- Location: Mwaro Province
- Coordinates: 3.32917°S 29.777346°E
- Purpose: Power
- Owner: REGIDESO Burundi

Dam and spillways
- Impounds: Kaniga River

Power Station
- Installed capacity: 0.35 megawatts (470 hp)

Nyamyotsi Hydroelectric Power Station (French: Centrale Hydroélectrique du Nyamyotsi) is an 0.3 megawatts (400 hp) run-of-the-river hydroelectric power station in the Mwaro Province of Burundi.

== History ==
The preliminary report on implementation of the Strategic Framework for the Fight against Poverty 2012-2015 gen2 (CSLP II), recommended construction of three micro hydroelectric power stations, including Nyamyotsi (350 kilowatts) in Kibimba. In September 2015 the new governor of the Mwaro Province. Jean Marie Nyakarerwa, inherited the project to build a dam in Nyamyotsi in the Commune of Ndava on the Kaniga river to supply the Kibimba village. The Nyamyotsi plant on the Kaniga came into service in 2018.

== See also ==
- List of power stations in Burundi

== Sources ==
- Kuriyo, Benjamin (19 June 2020), "Panorama du secteur énergétique", Burundi Eco (in French)
- Mwaro doté du nouveau Gouverneur (in French), 15 September 2015
- Ntibarikure, Mathias (13 September 2017), "Construction des centrales hydroélectriques : Où en est-on ?", Burundi Eco (in French)
