= Ndurumu River =

Ndurumu River may refer to:

- Ndurumu River (Ruvubu), a tributary of the Ruvubu River, which it enters in Burundi
- Ndurumu River (Akanyaru), a tributary of the Akanyaru River, which it enters from Burundi
