= Bujumbura Thermal Power Station =

Power station in Burundi

- Location within Burundi
- Official name: French: Centrale thermique de Bujumbura
- Country: Burundi
- Coordinates: 3.372177°S 29.35130°E
- Purpose: Power
- Status: Operational
- Opening date: 1999
- Owner: Regideso Burundi
- Operator: Regideso Burundi

Power Station
- Installed capacity: 5.5 megawatts (7,400 hp)

The Bujumbura Thermal Power Station (French: French: Centrale thermique de Bujumbura) is a 5.5 MW thermal power station in the Commune of Buyenzi in Bujumbura Mairie Province, Burundi. It is owned by Regideso Burundi.

== History ==
In 1995 REGIDESO acquired a 5.5 MW thermal power station in Bujumbura, but up to 2008 it was generally idle, available as an emergency back-up. Low prices for electricity and high costs for diesel made it uneconomical. By 2010, the severe electrical power deficit could only be rectified through overhaul of the Bujumbura thermal power plant and rental of a 10 MW thermal power plant. (Note: Diesel power generators are often housed in standard containers, making them relatively easy to transport, and installed in groups at the power station. They may be leased or purchased.)

In December 2010 the World Bank agreed to provide US$15 million to improve the electricity supply in Burundi, including an extension of the thermal power plant in Bujumbura. The second thermal plant, with 5.0MW capacity, operated through subsidies from the World Bank and the European Union. In 2012 Burundi was facing a large electrical power deficit, reaching 40% - 50% of demand in peak hours. The government was forced to order "load shedding" (power cuts). The Bujumbura Thermal Power Plant resumed operating in June 2012 to make up for the deficit at the Rwegura Hydroelectric Power Station and to reduce the need for load shedding.

As of 2013 Regideso owned just one thermal power plant in Bujumbura. There was no budget for fuel for the 5.5MW plant, installed in 2007, so it was not operating. A 10MW group on a 2-year lease with fuel financed for a year started operation in April 2013. Another 5MW group was to be set up later in 2013 under a World Bank emergency project. The 5.5MW thermal power plant was shut down in August 2014, and the 5MW plant in November 2015. The leased 10MW plant continued to supply power in 2016.

In 2017 Regideso signed a contract with Interpetrol to build and operate the 30MW Interpetrol Power Station. The contract with Interpetrol was for ten years. In October 2022 the director general of Regideso said he would restart the 5.5 Megawatt Buyenzi Thermal Power Station later that month, using fuel that was being used to power the Interpetrol Power Station. The Bujumbura Thermal Power Station, owned by Regideso, had been shut down for nine years.

== See also ==
- List of power stations in Burundi

== Sources ==
- IBP (3 March 2008), Burundi Energy Policy, Laws and Regulations Handbook Volume 1 Strategic Information and Regulations, ISBN 978-1-4330-7118-8
- Cadre Stratégique de Croissance et de Lutte contre la Pauvreté CSLP II (PDF) (in French), République du Burundi, January 2012
- Etude diagnostique du secteur de l’Energie au Burundi dans le cadre de l’Initiative du Secrétaire Général des Nations Unies sur l’Energie durable pour tous (Sustainable Energy for All) (PDF) (in French), Ministère de l’Energie et des Mines, June 2013
- La Banque mondiale aide le Burundi à faire face aux coupures d’électricité (in French), World Bank, 12 September 2012
- Les services ecosystemiques pour la survie de la popupulation et la croissance de l’economie nationale (PDF) (in French), Ministere de l'eau, de l'environnement, de l’amenagement du territoire et de l’urbanisme, February 2014
- Maniragaba, Mélance (7 November 2022), "Centrale thermique de 5,5 MW à l'arrêt : Des pertes énormes pendant neuf ans", Burundi Eco (in French)
- Manirakiza, Fabrice (9 June 2017), "«Nous espérons qu'en septembre cette centrale sera fonctionnelle.»", Iwacu (in French)
- Nsabimana, René (14 September 2020), "Electricity Sector Organization and Performance in Burundi", Proceedings, 58 (1), First World Energies Forum, doi:10.3390/WEF-06938
- Rapport Annuel 2016 (PDF) (in French), Regideso
- "WB to inject USD 15 million into Burundi's crisis-hit energy sector", PANA (in French), 2 December 2010
