= Mubuga Solar Power Station =

Solar farm in Burundi

- Country: Burundi
- Location: Mubuga, Gitega Province
- Coordinates: 03°22′29″S 29°59′14″E
- Status: Operational
- Construction began: January 2020
- Commission date: October 2021
- Construction cost: US$14 million
- Owner: Gigawatt Global Coöperatief
- Operator: "Voltalia"

Solar farm
- Type: Flat-panel PV

Power generation
- Nameplate capacity: 7.5 MW (10,100 hp); Expandable to 15 MW (20,000 hp)

The Mubuga Solar Power Station is a grid-connected 7.5 MW solar power plant in Burundi. The power station was constructed between January 2020 and October 2021, by Gigawatt Global Coöperatief, the Netherlands-based multinational independent power producer (IPP), through its local subsidiary Gigawatt Global Burundi SA. The off-taker for this power station is Régie de production et distribution d’eau et d’électricité (REGIDESO), the Burundian electricity parastatal utility company. A 25-year power purchase agreement (PPA) governs the sale of electricity between Gigawatt Global Burundi SA and REGIDESO. The engineering, procurement and construction (EPC) contractor was Voltalia of France, which was also awarded the operations, management and maintenance contract.

== Location ==
The power station is located in the settlement of Mubuga, in the Gitega Province of Burundi, approximately 15.2 kilometres (9 mi), northeast of the city of Gitega, the political capital of that country.

== Overview ==
This power station is the first grid-connected solar project developed by an IPP in Burundi. It is also the first major electricity generation investment in the country, in the past 30 years.

The renewable energy infrastructure was on the books since 2016. Attempts were made to start construction in 2018, but the process aborted. In January 2020, construction started in earnest. Despite delays attributed to the COVID-19 pandemic, the power installation was commercially commissioned in October 2021.

== Financing ==
A number of financial institutions participated in the financing of this renewable energy project. The Renewable Energy Performance Platform, based in London, United Kingdom, "provided a bridge loan for the construction of the Mubuga solar plant". A portion of the construction loan was refinanced as a "10-year subordinated loan".

Other funding sources included (a) Inspired Evolution II Fund (b) Belgian Investment Company for Developing Countries (BIO) and (c) U.S. International Development Finance Corporation (DFC). The African Trade and Investment Development Insurance (ATIDI), owned by COMESA, provides insurance cover "against political and commercial risks". ATIDI received technical and financial support from the World Bank Group.

== Benefits ==
At the time of commissioning in October 2021, it was reported that the 7.5 MW power plant contributed 10 percent to the country's generation capacity at that time. The energy generated here is enough to supply an estimated 90,000 people and businesses. A total of 190-300 part-time jobs were created during the construction phase. Another estimated 25-50 people were hired to operate the power station.

== Expansion ==
In May 2023, Evariste Ndayishimiye, the president of Burundi toured the solar farm and personally gave his approval for the power station's capacity to be expanded to 15 megawatts.

== See also ==
- List of power stations in Burundi
