= Gikonge Hydroelectric Power Station =

Power station in Burundi

- Location within Burundi
- Official name: French: Centrale Hydroélectrique Gikonge
- Country: Burundi
- Location: Muramvya Province
- Coordinates: 3.259598°S 29.659369°E
- Purpose: Power
- Status: Operational
- Opening date: 1982
- Owner: REGIDESO Burundi

Power Station
- Installed capacity: 0.85 megawatts (1,140 hp)

Gikonge Hydroelectric Power Station (French: Centrale Hydroélectrique Gikonge) is an 0.85 megawatts (1,140 hp) run-of-the-river hydroelectric power station in the Muramvya Province of Burundi.

== History ==
The Gikonge Hydroelectric Power Station is on the Mubarazi River, to the east of the city of Muramvya and north of the RN 2 highway. It was commissioned in 1982. As of 1983 the plant was providing power to the rural center of Muramvya. It was generating only at partial capacity, because local demand was still low and it was not yet connected to the main Bujumbura grid. It had two Ossberger turbines financed by Germany.

In 2005 the Chinese Government funded a maintenance project for the Gikonge Hydroelectric Power Plant and the 1.28 MW Ruvyironza Hydroelectric Power Station in Gitega Province. The project was undertaken by the Xinjiang Beixin International Engineering Construction Company, and was officially completed on 10 December 2008. The rehabilitated hydropower stations has a total installed energy of 2500 KW.

== See also ==
- List of power stations in Burundi

== Sources ==
- Burundi: Small Hydropower and Rural Development (PDF), Deutsche Gesellschaft für Internationale Zusammenarbeit (GIZ), 2023
- "Project ID: 73414 Chinese Government provides grant for First Phase of the Hydroelectric Power Plant Technical Cooperation Project", AidData, William & Mary
- "Way: Centrale hydroélectrique Gikonge (304015929)", OpenStreetMap
- Zimmermann, Robert; Inversin, Allen (February 1983), Burundi: Institutional requirements and technical alternatives for a small hydropower program (PDF), United States Agency for International Development, archived from the original (PDF) on February 27, 2017
