= Ruvyironza Hydroelectric Power Station =

Power station in Burundi

- Location within Burundi
- Official name: French: Centrale Hydroélectrique de Ruvyironza
- Country: Burundi
- Location: Gitega Province
- Coordinates: 3.347396°S 29.98481°E
- Purpose: Power
- Status: Operational
- Opening date: 1984
- Owner: REGIDESO Burundi

Dam and spillways
- Impounds: Ruvyironza River

Power Station
- Turbines: 3 x 425 KW
- Installed capacity: 1.28 megawatts (1,720 hp)

Ruvyironza Hydroelectric Power Station (French: Centrale Hydroélectrique de Ruvyironza) is an 1.28 megawatts (1,720 hp) run-of-the-river hydroelectric power station in the Gitega Province of Burundi.

== Location ==
The Ruvyironza power station is in Gitega Province, northeast of the city of Gitega, facing Karuzi Province over the Ruvubu River. It is fed by a canal running south from a dam on the Ruvyironza River near its mouth on the Ruvubu River. It discharges into the Ruvubu River. The dam is just south of the colline of Rushanga, in the Commune of Bugendana.

== History ==
The Ruvyironza plant, owned by REGIDESO Burundi, was commissioned in 1980/1984. Power is supplied by three 425 KW turbines, delivering 1275 KW when all three are running, or 850 KW when just two are operational.

The power station was out of service due to flooding between 2004 and 2007. In 2005 the Chinese government funded a maintenance project for the Gikonge Hydroelectric Power Plant and the 1.28 MW Ruvyironza hydroelectric power station in Rushanga. The project was undertaken by the Xinjiang Beixin International Engineering Construction Company, and was officially completed on 10 December 2008. The rehabilitated hydropower stations have a total installed energy of 2500 KW.

The Ruvyironza power station again experienced serious flooding in 2014, 2016 and 2018. Production is dependendent on levels of rainfall. The plant produced 6,594,710 Kwh in 2012, 8,237,200 Kwh in 2015 and 4,686,100 Kwh in 2021.

== See also ==
- List of power stations in Burundi

== Sources ==
- Bizimana, Arthur (4 July 2024), "Climate and agriculture: a double threat to hydroelectric production in Burundi", Inside Burundi
- "Centrale hydroélectrique Rushanga", OpenStreetMap
- Nsabimana, René (September 2022), Quality of service and access to electricity in Burundi and East Africa, a comparison of sector performance (PDF), University of Liège
- "Project ID: 73414 Chinese Government provides grant for First Phase of the Hydroelectric Power Plant Technical Cooperation Project", AidData, William & Mary
- "Ruvyironza", Energypedia
