= Murembwe Hydroelectric Power Station =

Power station in Burundi

Murembwe Hydroelectric Power Plant
- Location within Burundi
- Official name: French: Centrale Hydroélectrique de Murembwe
- Country: Burundi
- Coordinates: 3.845998°S 29.575877°E
- Purpose: Power
- Status: Operational
- Opening date: 16 June 2026
- Owner: Government of Burundi
- Operator: REGIDESO Burundi

Dam and spillways
- Impounds: Murembwe River

Power Station
- Installed capacity: 17.5 megawatts (23,500 hp)
- Annual generation: 90.5 GWh

The Murembwe Hydroelectric Power Plant (French: Centrale Hydroélectrique de Murembwe) is a hydroelectric power station in the Bururi Province of Burundi. It was inaugurated on 16 June 2026 by Prime Minister Nestor Ntahontuye.

== Location ==
The Murembwe Hydroelectric Power Plant is being built as part of the Jiji and Murembwe Hydroelectric Project. It will be owned and operated by REGIDESO Burundi, part of the Ministry of Hydraulics, Energy and Mines. The Mulembwe hydroelectric power station is on the Murembwe River (Mulembwe River), upstream from the Jiji River junction.

== Dam ==
The dam is less than 15 metres (49 ft) high and impounds a reservoir of 50,000 cubic metres (1,800,000 cu ft). Up to 8 cubic metres per second (280 cu ft/s) is diverted to the water intake for the plant, while any excess is returned to the river. A minimum flow of 0.424 cubic metres per second (15.0 cu ft/s) is guaranteed for the river section between the dam and the power station.

== Plant ==
The plant is about 1.5 kilometres (0.93 mi) downstream from the dam. Water is taken there by a 1.13 kilometres (0.70 mi) underground gallery with a diameter of 2.8 metres (9 ft 2 in) to an equilibrium chamber, then by a 600 metres (2,000 ft) surface penstock with 1.6 metres (5 ft 3 in) diameter falling 258 metres (846 ft). The plant will have a capacity of 17.5 MW and estimated annual power is 90.5 GWh.

== Transmission ==
A 110 kV power line runs 5.5 kilometres (3.4 mi) north from the Jiji station up the Mulembwe River to the Mulembwe station, where it is joined by a 110 kV power line from that station. The two lines run east 2.3 kilometres (1.4 mi) to the Horezo switchyard on RP 403 highway. From there, lines run north towards Kabezi and Bujumbura, and southeast towards Bururi.

== See also ==
- List of power stations in Burundi

== Sources ==
- Faller, Tanja (2014), Projet de developpement des centrales hydroelectriques de Jiji et Mulembwe (PDF), African Development Bank
- Projet Hydroélectrique Jiji et Murembwe (in French), REGIDESO
