= Ruzibazi Hydroelectric Power Station =

Power station in Burundi

Ruzibazi Hydroelectric Power Plant
- Location within Burundi
- Official name: French: Centrale Hydroélectrique de Ruzibazi
- Country: Burundi
- Coordinates: 3.72346°S 29.36172°E
- Purpose: Power
- Status: Operational
- Construction began: October 2018
- Opening date: 6 September 2022
- Owner: REGIDESO Burundi

Dam and spillways
- Impounds: Ruzibazi River

Power Station
- Operator: REGIDESO Burundi
- Commission date: 6 September 2022
- Installed capacity: 15 megawatts (20,000 hp)

The Ruzibazi Hydroelectric Power Plant (French: Centrale Hydroélectrique de Ruzibazi) is a hydroelectric power station in the Rumonge Province of Burundi.

== Location ==
The Ruzibazi Hydroelectric Power Station is in Rutumo colline, Minago zone in the Commune of Rumonge. The dam is on the Ruzibazi River between the Commune of Bugarama and the Commune of Rumonge. There are two transmission lines, a 5 MW line to Rumonge and a 10MW line to Kabezi station.

== Construction ==
The agreement between China and the Burundian Ministry of Energy and Mines was signed on 26 August 2016. Work was planned to start in August 2017 and complete around 2021. Construction by the Chinese company Sinohydro began in October 2018 and was completed ahead of schedule in July 2022. It was inaugurated on 6 September 2022 in a ceremony attended by Evariste Ndayishimiye, President of Burundi. The Chinese ambassador, Zhao Jiangping, was also present.

== Technical ==
The power plant includes a gravity dam, a supply channel, a power plant, a return channel, a step-up transformer station and an electrical transmission line. It has a capacity of 15 MW. As of February 2022 the Ruzibazi-Kabezi line had been completed. The Kabezi section of the dispatching center in Ngagara in the commune of Ntahangwa and the substation were not yet complete, but were expected to be ready on time.

== See also ==
- List of power stations in Burundi

== Sources ==
- "Burundi / Chine : Travaux de la Centrale Hydroélectrique RUZIBAZI 15MW en 2017", AGnews (in French), 4 September 2016
- Habarugira, Bruce (11 February 2022), "Centrale hydroélectrique de Ruzibazi : Sa mise en service prévue pour avril 2022", Burundi Eco (in French)
- Inauguration de la Centrale hydroélectrique de RUZIBAZI, Maison Ntare Rushatsi, 6 September 2022
- "Le barrage hydroélectrique de Ruzibazi sera opérationnel à partir du mois de mai", Agence Burundaise de Presse, 21 April 2022
- Ntahondi, Nathan (8 September 2022), "Province de Rumonge : Le chef de l'Etat inaugure la centrale hydroélectrique de Ruzibazi", Le Renouveau
