= Interpetrol Power Station =

Power station in Burundi

- Location within Burundi
- Official name: French: Centrale Interpetrol
- Country: Burundi
- Coordinates: 3.371464°S 29.351183°E
- Purpose: Power
- Owner: Interpetrol Burundi

Power Station
- Installed capacity: 45 megawatts (60,000 hp)

The Interpetrol Power Station (French: French: Centrale Interpetrol) is a thermal power station in the Bujumbura Mairie Province of Burundi. It is owned by Interpetrol Burundi SA.

== Location ==
The Centrale Interpetrol is to the west of the Buyenzi district of Bujumbura, south of the Ntahangwa River. It is on the east side of the RN5 Boulevard Melchior Ndadaye opposite the Brarudi Brewery and the Port of Bujumbura on Lake Tanganyika.

== History ==
In 2010 the state-owned water and power company Regideso Burundi signed a contract with Interpetrol to supply 10 MW for six months. Regideso lost money on the contract.

In 2017 Regideso signed a contract with Interpetrol to build and operate a thermal power plant. By June 2017 six of the nineteen planned generators had arrived and the others were on the way. The site for the generators had been prepared. A protective wall was being built to prevent damage from the Ntahangwa River, and a 1,000,000 litres (220,000 imp gal; 260,000 US gal) fuel tank was being built. It was expected that the 30MW plant would be ready by September 2017, and Regideso would no longer have to practice "load shedding" power cuts. The contract with Interpetrol was for ten years.

In April 2018 the Director General of Interpetrol Burundi threatened to suspend production, since Regideso had failed to make payments on schedule. He also noted that Regideso was only requesting about 20MW on average while the sale price was based on 30MW, which was causing Interpetrol to lose money. Other complaints were that the tax administration was not respecting exemptions for spare parts and equipment, and the Bank of the Republic of Burundi (BRB) was not releasing dollars for Interpetrol to pay suppliers. Regideso refuted these charges, complaining that Interpetrol was charging above the agreed price, which would cause huge losses to Regideso since their retail sales price was fixed.

In October 2022 the director general of Regideso said he would restart the 5.5 Megawatt Buyenzi Thermal Power Station later that month, using fuel that was being used to power the Interpetrol power station. The Buyenzi Thermal Power Station, owned by Regideso, had been shut down for nine years.

== See also ==
- List of power stations in Burundi

== Sources ==
- Gahama, Parfait (19 April 2018), "Interpetrol tire la sonnette d'alarme", Iwacu (in French)
- Maniragaba, Mélance (7 November 2022), "Centrale thermique de 5,5 MW à l'arrêt : Des pertes énormes pendant neuf ans", Burundi Eco (in French)
- Manirakiza, Fabrice (9 June 2017), "«Nous espérons qu'en septembre cette centrale sera fonctionnelle.»", Iwacu (in French)
- "Way: Centrale Interpetrol (847830680)", OpenStreetMap
