= Dama River =

Dama River may refer to:

- Dama River (Burundi), a river in Burundi
- Dama River (Fiji), a tributary of the Vanua Levu in Fiji
