= Buhiga Hydroelectric Power Station =

Power station in Burundi

- Location within Burundi
- Official name: French: Centrale Hydroélectrique de Buhiga
- Country: Burundi
- Location: Karuzi Province
- Coordinates: 3.04009°S 30.153656°E
- Purpose: Power
- Owner: REGIDESO Burundi

Dam and spillways
- Impounds: Ndurumu River (Ruvubu)

Power Station
- Commission date: 1984
- Installed capacity: 240 kW

Buhiga Hydroelectric Power Station (French: Centrale Hydroélectrique de Buhiga) is an 0.47 megawatts (630 hp) run-of-the-river hydroelectric power station in the Karuzi Province of Burundi.

== Location ==
The power station is to the southeast of the Buhiga District Hospital and the town of Buhiga. It is about 600 metres (2,000 ft) south-southeast of the dam on the Ndurumu River. It supplies the city of Buhiga and Karuzi.

== Technical ==
The power station has a hydraulic head of 26 metres (85 ft) and installed power of 220 kW using an Ossberger turbine. A concrete masonry gravity dam diverts water from the upper Ndurumu River into the intake and settling area. From there, it flows through a 440 metres (1,440 ft) power canal, then down a steel penstock to the turbogenerator. Given the available river flow, the station was designed to allow for later installation of a second turbine in the powerhouse.

== History ==
Buhiga Hydroelectric Power Station was commissioned in 1984. The project was funded by the Mission of the Eglise Episcopale du Burundi.

In 1991 the hydropower plants of Buhiga (240 KW) and Ruyigi (70KW), both run at that time by Direction Generale de L'Hydraulique et de l'Electrification Rurales (DGHER), were handed over to REGIDESO Burundi for operation.

In 2007 it was expected that the Marangara (280 kW), Buhiga (240 kW) and Kayenzi (800 kW) power plants would soon by connected to the national grid through the Musasa substation, which would be connected by a 30 kV line to the Ngozi substation. The project was financed by the Programme de réhabilitation du Burundi (PREBU).

In 2012 the government issued a National strategy for electricity access which included plans to double the capacity of the Buhiga station.

== See also ==
- List of power stations in Burundi

== Sources ==
- "Centrale Hydroélectrique de Buhiga", Google Maps
- Kizza, Michael; Kyaruzi, Alexander; Nyamichaba Oonge, Zablon Isaboke; Rurihose, Fidèle; Ruhamya, Colleta; Kigobe, Max; Joel, Nobert; Nagawa, Helen (2010), Future Hydropower Scenarios Under the Influence of Climate Change for the Riparian Countries of Lake Victoria Basin (PDF), University of Dar es Salaam
- GEF-6 Project Identification Form (PDF), Global Environment Facility (GEF), 2015
- Study on the interconnection of the electricity networks of the Nile equatorial lakes countries (PDF), vol. 1 – Power supply and demand analysis, NELSAP, October 2007
- Zimmermann, Robert; Inversin, Allen (February 1983), Burundi. Institutional requirements and technical alternatives for a small hydropower program (PDF), United States Agency for International Development, archived from the original (PDF) on February 27, 2017
