= Jiji River =

River in Burundi

- Location within Burundi
- Native name: Rivière Jiji (French)

Location
- Country: Burundi
- Province: Bururi Province

Physical characteristics
- Mouth
  - location: Murembwe River
  - coordinates: 3.88845°S 29.55797°E

The Jiji River (French: Rivière Murembwe) is a river in Burundi.

== Course ==
The Jiji River rises in the east of Bururi Province near Ruvuye. It flows east, then north, then flows west, parallel to the Siguvyaye River to its south, to its mouth on the Murembwe River. The river defines the northeast tip of the Bururi Forest Nature Reserve.

== Environment ==
The surroundings of the Jiji river are a mosaic of farmland and natural vegetation. The area is quite densely populated, with 166 inhabitants per square kilometer as of 2016. The average annual temperature in the area is 17 °C (63 °F). The warmest month is September, when the average temperature is 20 °C (68 °F), and the coldest is January, with 15 °C (59 °F). Average annual rainfall is 1,174 millimetres (46.2 in). The rainiest month is December, with an average of 200 millimetres (7.9 in) of precipitation, and the driest is July, with 1 millimetre (0.039 in) of precipitation.

== Dam ==
In 2013 the Burundian government started a project to build hydroelectric dams on the Jiji and Murembwe rivers. Work began in 2020 after seven years of study. Alain-Guillaume Bunyoni, prime minister of Burundi, visited the sites in June 2021. He said work on the access roads was going well, work had started on the Jiji River and would start soon on the Murembwe River.

In December 2022 there were torrential rains in Muheka colline, below the Nyakigo colline, but officials of the ORASCOM company said the Jiji Murembwe Hydroelectric Power Station was not badly affected. The director general of REGIDESO Burundi asked ORASCOM to speed up the work.

== See also ==
- List of rivers of Burundi

== Sources ==
- "La centrale hydroélectrique de Jiji Murembwe restée en bon état malgré les aléas climatiques", Agence Burundaise de Presse (in French), 19 December 2022
- NASA Earth Observations: Population Density, NASA/SEDAC, archived from the original on 9 February 2016
- NASA Earth Observations Data Set Index, NASA, archived from the original on 11 May 2020 Temperature data from satellite measurements of the earth's surface temperature within a box that is 0.1 x 0.1 degrees.
- NASA Earth Observations: Rainfall (1 month - TRMM), NASA/Tropical Rainfall Monitoring Mission, archived from the original on 19 April 2019 Average value for the years 2012–2014 within a box that is 0.1 x 0.1 degrees.
- NASA Earth Observations: Land Cover Classification, NASA/MODIS, archived from the original on 28 February 2016
- Ndereyimana, Fidès (15 June 2021), "Construction des barrages Jiji et Murembwe : Malgré le retard constaté, les travaux avancent", Le Renouveau du Burundi
- "Relation: Jiji (17502783)", OpenStreetMap
