= Kabu 16 Hydroelectric Power Station =

Power station in Burundi

- Map of Burundi showing the location of Kabu 16 Hydroelectric Power Station. Kabu 16 Hydroelectric Power Station (Africa) Kabu 16 Hydroelectric Power Station (Earth)
- Country: Burundi
- Location: Cibitoke Province
- Coordinates: 02°55′30″S 29°15′45″E
- Purpose: Power
- Status: Operational
- Construction began: March 2019
- Opening date: 25 October 2024
- Owner: Government of Burundi

Dam and spillways
- Impounds: Kaburantwa River

Power Station
- Type: Francis
- Turbines: 2 x 10MW
- Installed capacity: 20 megawatts (27,000 hp)
- Annual generation: 117.7 gigawatt-hours (424 TJ)

Kabu 16 Hydroelectric Power Station is a 20 megawatts (27,000 hp) hydroelectric power station in Burundi. It was developed by the government of Burundi, with funding from the Indian government. Construction began in March 2019 and was completed in October 2024. It was formerly opened on October 25, 2024.

== Location ==
The power station is located across the Kaburantwa River, a tributary of the Ruzizi River. The power station is approximately 16 kilometres (10 mi) upstream of where the two rivers merge.

This location is in Cibitoke Province, in the northwest of the country, approximately 28 kilometres (17 mi), southeast of the town of Cibitoke, the provincial capital.

== Overview ==
The engineering, procurement, and construction (EPC) contract was awarded to Angelique International Limited of India. The development involves the construction of a concrete and rock-fill dam, with a hydraulic head (water drop) of 191 metres (627 ft). WAPCOS Ltd. (A Govt. of India Undertaking) is Project Management Consultant for Kabu-16 HEP and monitored the project for good quality and timely completion. Two vertical Francis turbines, each rated at 10 megawatts were supplied by Voith, the German industrial machinery manufacturer. Other infrastructure installed include the construction of staff housing for the construction workers, an electric switchyard, electricity transmission lines and access roads to the site.

== Funding ==
The power station was funded by the Government of India as a developmental grant, with money borrowed from the Export-Import Bank of India.

== Operations and benefits ==
The power station was handed over to REGIDESO, the Burundian state-owned electric utility monopoly company, responsible for generation, transmission and distribution; and who will be operating it.

The power station supplies 177.7GWh of green energy into the Burundi grid, increasing available power for national economic expansion and job creation.

== See also ==
- List of power stations in Burundi
