= Jiji and Murembwe Hydroelectric Project =

Power station in Burundi

- Location within Burundi
- Official name: French: Projet Hydroélectrique de Jiji et Murembwe
- Country: Burundi
- Coordinates: 3.888450°S 29.557970°E
- Purpose: Power
- Status: Operational
- Opening date: 24 June 2025 (Jiji), 16 June 2026 (Mulembwe)
- Construction cost: US$320 million for both stations
- Owner: REGIDESO Burundi
- Operator: REGIDESO Burundi

Dam and spillways
- Impounds: Mulembwe River, Jiji River
- Height: 434 metres (1,424 ft) for Jiji; 256 metres (840 ft)for Mulembwe

Power Station
- Installed capacity: Total 50 megawatts (67,000 hp) with: 32.5 megawatts (43,600 hp) for Jiji; 17.5 megawatts (23,500 hp) for Mulembwe

The Jiji and Murembwe Hydroelectric Project (French: Projet Hydroélectrique de Jiji et Murembwe, PHJIMU) was a project to build two hydroelectric power stations with shared infrastructure in the former Bururi Province (part of current Burunga Province) of Burundi. Both stations were completed and are fully operational. Jiji hydroelectric power station was completed and inaugurated on 24 June 2025. Mulembwe station was completed and inaugurated on 16 June 2026.

== Components ==
The project was undertaken for REGIDESO Burundi, part of the Ministry of Hydraulics, Energy and Mines. It included building two run-of the river hydroelectric power plants in the Songa Commune of the former Bururi Province and the Buyengero Commune of the former Rumonge Province both part of present day Burunga Province , in southern Burundi. Contractors include CMC (Italy), ORASCOM (Egypt), KEC International (India) for the transmission lines and VINCI (France) for the associated stations.

=== Jiji Hydroelectric Power Plant ===
The Jiji Hydroelectric Power Plant on the Jiji River exploits a head height of 434 metres (1,424 ft) with a capacity of 32.5 MW. The Jiji hydroelectric power station is near the point where the Jiji River joins the Murembwe River. The Jiji dam is upstream, directing water along a supply conduit to a tunnel which leads to the forebay. From there a penstock carries the water down to the power station.

It was officially inaugurated par President Évariste Ndayishimiye on 24 June 2025.

=== Murembwe Hydroelectric Power Plant ===
The Murembwe Hydroelectric Power Plant on the Murembwe River (Mulembwe River) exploits a head height of 256 metres (840 ft) with a capacity of 17.5 MW. The Mulembwe hydroelectric power station is upstream from the Jiji River junction. It has a similar configuration, with a dam directing water through a tunnel to the penstock.

=== Transmission ===
A 110 kV power line runs 5.5 kilometres (3.4 mi) north from the Jiji station up the Mulembwe River to the Mulembwe station, where it is joined by a 110 kV power line from that station. The two lines run east 2.3 kilometres (1.4 mi) to the Horezo switchyard on RP 403 highway. From there, lines run north towards Kabezi and Bujumbura, and southeast towards Bururi. Other components include two 110 kV switching stations at the Jiji and Mulembwe hydroelectric plants, a 110/30 kV substation in Horezo, a 110/30/10 kV substation in Kabezi, extensions to existing substations, about 107.2 kilometres (66.6 mi) of 110 kV transmission lines, as well as distribution lines.

It was inaugurated on 16 June 2026 by Prime Minister Nestor Ntahontuye.

== Finance ==
The total project cost was extimated at US$270 million. The African Development Bank (AfDB) approved a grant of $22 million on 23 June 2014 in Tunis. Other funding is supplied by the World Bank (US$100 million), the European Investment Bank (US$95 million), the African Development Bank ($US$22 million), the European Union (US$36.6 million), the Government of Burundi (US$14,3 million) and REGIDESO (US$2.5 million).

The project was initially scheduled for completion in December 2023. In February 2024 Regideso announced that the Jiji station would be commissioned by 30 December 2024 and the Mulembwe station by 30 March 2025. After cost overruns, effective May 2024 work continued at Jiji and Mulembwe under additional financing of US$102 million, of which the World Bank contributed US$50 million.

== Events ==
The Burundian government started the project to build hydroelectric dams on the Jiji and Murembwe rivers in 2013. Work began in 2020 after seven years of study. Alain-Guillaume Bunyoni, prime minister of Burundi, visited the sites in June 2021. He said work on the access roads was going well, work had started on the Jiji River and would start soon on the Murembwe River.

In December 2022 there were torrential rains in Muheka colline, below the Nyakigo colline, but officials of the ORASCOM company said the Jiji Murembwe Hydroelectric Power Station was not badly affected. The director general of REGIDESO Burundi asked ORASCOM to speed up the work.

In September 2022 Gervais Ndirakobuca, prime minister of Burundi, visited the two hydroelectic dams, where he observed cracks in the structures.

On 24 June 2025, Jiji hydroelectric power station was officially inaugurated by President Évariste Ndayishimiye adding 32.5 Mw to the national grid.

Murembwe Hydroelectric power station was subsequently inaugurated on 16 June 2025 by Prime Minister Nestor Ntahontuye, adding an additional 17.5 Mw to the grid.

== See also ==
- List of power stations in Burundi

== Sources ==
- "Barrage Jiji-Murembwe : La BAD accorde 22 millions de dollars", Isanganiro (in French), 25 June 2014
- Faller, Tanja (2014), Projet de developpement des centrales hydroelectriques de Jiji et Mulembwe (PDF), African Developmewnt Bank
- Jiji et Mulembwe sous le financementadditionnel (in French), Regideso, 24 August 2024
- "La centrale hydroélectrique de Jiji Murembwe restée en bon état malgré les aléas climatiques", Agence Burundaise de Presse (in French), 19 December 2022
- Manirakiza, Fabrice (27 September 2022), "Projet Jiji-Murembwe : visite surprise du Premier ministre", Iwacu (in French)
- Ndereyimana, Fidès (15 June 2021), "Construction des barrages Jiji et Murembwe : Malgré le retard constaté, les travaux avancent", Le Renouveau du Burundi
- Ndirariha, Nobel (4 March 2024), "Barrages Jiji-Mulembwe : des reports de mise en service jusqu'à quand ?", Yaga Burundi (in French)
- Projet Hydroélectrique Jiji et Murembwe (in French), REGIDESO
