= Kaniga River =

River in Burundi

Kaniga
- Location within Burundi
- Native name: Rivière Kaniga (French)

Location
- Country: Burundi
- Province: Bururi Province

Physical characteristics
- Source
  - location: Mwaro Province
  - coordinates: 3.41438°S 29.70441°E
  - elevation: 1,970 m (6,460 ft)
- Mouth: Mubarazi River
  - location: Border between Gitega Province and Muramvya Province
  - coordinates: 3.25484°S 29.81030°E
  - elevation: 1,520 m (4,990 ft)
- Length: 46.5 km (28.9 mi)
- Basin size: 230.6 km^{2} (89.0 sq mi)
- Discharge
  - location: Mouth
  - average: 2.15 m^{3} (75.82 cu ft)
  - minimum: 0.558 m^{3} (19.71 cu ft)
  - maximum: 4.66 m^{3} (164.7 cu ft)

Basin features
- Progression: Mubarazi → Rurubu → Kagera → Lake Victoria → White Nile → Nile → Mediterranean Sea
- Population: 91,464 (2016)

The Kaniga River (French: Rivière Kaniga) is a river in Burundi.

== Course ==
The Kaniga River is a tributary of the Mubarazi River, which it joins from the right (south) to the west of Busangana. It is one of the four principal rivers that drain the Mwaro Region. These are the Mubarazi and Kaniga in the northwest, the Kayokwe in the northeast and the Mushwabure in the southwest, centre and southeast.

The Kaniga is 46.5 km (28.9 mi) long and has a basin 230.6 km^{2} (89.0 sq mi) in area. It forms to the east of Gatsinga, Mwaro Province, and flows north-northeast parallel to highway RP 112 for its whole length. The upper section of the river forms the boundary between Muramvya Province and Mwaro Province. The lower section flows north along the boundary between Muramvya Province and Gitega Province, and is crossed by the RN2 highway before entering an area of marshes and joining the Mubarazi River.

== Environment ==
The surroundings of Kaniga are a mosaic of agricultural land and natural vegetation. The area is densely populated, with 411 inhabitants per square kilometer. The average annual temperature in the area is 20 °C (68 °F). The warmest month is September, when the average temperature is 22 °C (72 °F), and the coldest is May, with 18 °C (64 °F). Average annual rainfall is 1,149 millimetres (45.2 in). The wettest month is December, with an average of 175 millimetres (6.9 in) of precipitation, and the driest is July, with 1 millimetre (0.039 in) of precipitation.

== Agriculture ==
In the Commune of Ndava, Mwaro Province, the climate is too cold for rice. Finger millet is the main crop in most of the marshes, rather than sweet potatoes and corn. The millet is planted after the floods of the rainy season.

In September 2023 rain, hail and violent wind damaged the banana plantations and fields of sweet potatoes and potatoes in the Kaniga marsh of the Kirambi village in the Commune of Rusaka, Mwaro Province.

The Mubarazi-Kaniga marshes cover about 130 hectares (320 acres) in the Mbuye and Rutegama communes of Muramvya Province, and produce almost 1,000 tons of rice annually. The flow of the Mubarazi is controlled above the marshes by an irrigation dam.

== Hydroelectricity ==
The preliminary report on implementation of the Strategic Framework for the Fight against Poverty 2012-2015 gen2 (CSLP II), recommended construction of three micro hydroelectric power stations, including the Nyamyotsi Hydroelectric Power Station (350 kilowatts) in Kibimba. In September 2015 the new governor of the Mwaro Province, Jean Marie Nyakarerwa, inherited the project to build a dam in Nyamyotsi in the Commune of Ndava on the Kaniga river to supply the Kibimba village. The Nyamyotsi plant on the Kaniga came into service in 2018.

== See also ==
- List of rivers of Burundi

== Sources ==
- Center For International Earth Science Information Network-CIESIN-Columbia University (2016), Gridded Population of the World, Version 4 (GPWv4): Population Count, Palisades, NY: NASA Socioeconomic Data and Applications Center (SEDAC), doi:10.7927/H4X63JVC
- Etude d'une méthodologie d'évaluation de l'impact du Project des Travaux Publics et de Création d'Emplois sur l'environnement (PDF) (in French), Ministère des Finances Project des Travaux Publics et de Création d'Emplois, May 2000, archived from the original (PDF) on 21 August 2024
- Kuriyo, Benjamin (19 June 2020), "Panorama du secteur énergétique", Burundi Eco (in French)
- "Les travaux de sarclage et d'application des engrais chimiques dans les champs de riz des marais de Mubarazi-Kaniga appréciés à plus de 80%", Agence Burundaise de Presse (in French), 21 March 2024
- Linke, Simon; Lehner, Bernhard; Ouellet Dallaire, Camille; Ariwi, Joseph; Grill, Günther; Anand, Mira; Beames, Penny; Burchard-Levine, Vicente; Maxwell, Sally; Moidu, Hana; Tan, Florence; Thieme, Michele (2019-12-09), "Global hydro-environmental sub-basin and river reach characteristics at high spatial resolution", Scientific Data, 6 (1), doi:10.1038/s41597-019-0300-6, ISSN 2052-4463, PMC 6901482, PMID 31819059
- Mwaro doté du nouveau Gouverneur (in French), 15 September 2015
- Mwaro, l'éleusine en triomphe (in French), L’Association pour la dignité paysanne, ADIP, 23 September 2022
- NASA Earth Observations: Population Density, NASA/SEDAC, archived from the original on 9 February 2016
- NASA Earth Observations Data Set Index, NASA, archived from the original on 6 August 2013 Temperature data from satellite measurements of the earth's surface temperature within a box that is 0.1x0.1 degrees.
- NASA Earth Observations: Rainfall (1 month - TRMM), NASA/Tropical Rainfall Monitoring Mission, archived from the original on 19 April 2019 Average value for the years 2012–2014 within a box that is 0.1x0.1 degrees.
- NASA Earth Observations: Land Cover Classification, NASA/MODIS, archived from the original on 28 February 2016
- Ntibarikure, Mathias (13 September 2017), "Construction des centrales hydroélectriques : Où en est-on ?", Burundi Eco (in French)
- "Rain mixed with wind and hail damaged fields", Burundi News Agency, 24 September 2023
- "Way: Kaniga (573771053)", OpenStreetMap
