= Muhembuzi River =

River in Burundi

Muhembuzi River Mubembuzi
- Location within Burundi
- Native name: Rivière Muhembuzi (French)

Location
- Country: Burundi
- Province: Kirundo Province

Physical characteristics
- Source
  - location: Rungazi
  - coordinates: 2°36′9″S 30°13′26″E
  - elevation: 1,654 m (5,427 ft)
- Mouth: Lake Rweru
  - location: Kirundo Province of Burundi
  - coordinates: 2.46901°S 30.27163°E
  - elevation: 1,324 m (4,344 ft)
- Length: 20 km (12 mi)
- Basin size: 80.8 km^{2} (31.2 sq mi)
- Discharge
  - location: Mouth
  - average: 0.475 m^{3} (16.77 cu ft)
  - minimum: 0.163 m^{3} (5.756 cu ft)
  - maximum: 1.11 m^{3} (39.06 cu ft)

Basin features
- Progression: Lake Rweru → Kagera → Lake Victoria → White Nile → Nile → Mediterranean Sea
- Population: 47,300

The Muhembuzi River (French: Rivière Muhembuzi) is a river in the northeast of Kirundo Province, Burundi, a tributary of Lake Rweru.

== Course ==
The Muhembuzi River flows north and then northeast through the Commune of Busoni into the south end of Lake Rweru. It forms to the west of the Rungazi colline, and flows north between the Munyinya and Gatemere collines. It passes to the west of Murore and flows through the Busoni colline, then turns to the northeast through the Burara colline. It enters the lake to the west of Nyagisozi colline.

== Environment ==
The surroundings of Muhembuzi are a mosaic of farmland and natural vegetation. The area is densely populated, with 308 inhabitants per square kilometer. Savannah climate prevails in the area. The average annual temperature in the area is 21 °C (70 °F). The warmest month is September, when the average temperature is 24 °C (75 °F), and the coldest is April, with 18 °C (64 °F). Average annual rainfall is 1,170 millimetres (46 in). The wettest month is March, with an average of 178 millimetres (7.0 in) of precipitation, and the driest is July, with 1 millimetre (0.039 in) of precipitation.

== Marsh ==
The Muhembuzi marsh is in the Bugesera natural region. It flows directly into Lake Rweru. The developed part extends from about 2 kilometres (1.2 mi) upstream from the RP314 Busoni–Bwambarangwe road down to the RP63 Gatare–Nyagisozi road, a few hundred meters from Lake Rweru. There are five collines on the left (west) bank: Gatare, Kigoma, Nyakizu, Burara and Mugobe and thee on the right (east) bank: Ruheha, Nyabugeni and Butabo. The land has medium slopes and erosion is not very intense.

The marsh has been developed by the local people for several decades. It is fully cultivated year round, and had no wild biodiversity. As of 2020 the marsh operators were organized in a cooperative of about 1,800 people which had two sheds, one in Nyakizu colline on the left bank, and one in Nyabugeni colline on the right bank. The cooperative members have been trained in modern methods of intensive rice cultivation, using less seeds and producing more.

A three-year program for 2003-2005 was launched to develop the 150 hectares (370 acres) Muhembuzi marsh, and supervise cultivation of rice and of market gardening crops that could grow in all seasons. The program also included development of the Muhembuzi watershed by planting anti-erosion hedges on contour lines, planting fixing grasses and other measures that would preserve the dikes and canals in the marshland.

The marsh operators were meant to pay fees to the commune and the cooperative, but as of 2020 these were no longer being paid. After the marsh was first developed, the cooperative paid three employees to manage water distribution gates. By 2020 these employees had left and the gates no longer worked. The dykes and canals had mostly been demolished. Some parts of the marsh were often flooded, while others never received water. Due to lack of coordination, nearby rice fields would be at different stages of maturity with different water needs. There were frequent conflicts over water sharing.

In 2021 Enabel's Association for the Promotion of Education and Training Abroad (APEFE) launched a proposal for collaboration with the Programme d’Appui Institutionnel et Opérationnel au Secteur Agricole (PAIOSA) to rehabilitate the Muhembuzi marsh and the Ndurumu marsh in Bugesera. On 23 March 2023 the Irrigation Development Support Program (PADI) was officially launched to develop irrigation of the 160 hectares (400 acres) Muhembuzi marsh in the Burara colline of the Commune of Busoni. The floods that often occur would be controlled and agricultural yields would increase.

== See also ==
- List of rivers of Burundi

== Sources ==
- Investment opportunities in renewable energy Burundi (PDF), Minister for Energy and Mines, October 2012, p. 14
- NASA Earth Observations: Population Density, NASA/SEDAC, archived from the original on 9 February 2016
- NASA Earth Observations Data Set Index, NASA, archived from the original on 28 November 2017
- NASA Earth Observations: Rainfall (1 month - TRMM), NASA/Tropical Rainfall Monitoring Mission, archived from the original on 19 April 2019
- NASA Earth Observations: Land Cover Classification, NASA/MODIS, archived from the original on 28 February 2016
- "PADI, un programme qui vient à point nommé pour booster la production agricole" (PDF), Burundi Eco (in French), 31 March 2023
- Projet d’appui au développement durable des chaines de valeur de l’agriculture et de l’elevage au Burundi. Etude d’impact environnemental et social (PDF) (in French), Ministere de l’environnement, de l’agriculture et de l’elevage, August 2020
- Rapport de résultats 2021 (PDF), Enabel, 2022
- Ruzima, Salvator (March 2004), Renforcement des capacites pour la mise en œuvre de la strategie nationale et plan d’actions en matiere de diversite biologique (PDF) (in French), Bujumbura: Ministere de l’amenagement de l’environnement
- U.S. Defense Mapping Agency (1994), Kirundo (PDF), University of Texas at Austin
- U.S. Defense Mapping Agency (1994), Lac Rweru, University of Texas at Austin
- "Way: Muhembuzi (1263776717)", OpenStreetMap
