= Kirasa River =

River in Burundi

- Location within Burundi
- Native name: French: Rivière Kirasa

Location
- Country: Burundi
- Province: Rumonge Province

Physical characteristics
- Mouth
  - location: Lake Tanganyika
  - coordinates: 3.59695°S 29.34765°E

The Kirasa River (French: Rivière Kirasa) is a river in Rumonge Province, Burundi.

== Course ==
The Kirasa River flows in a generally westward direction through the extreme north of Rumonge Province to its mouth on Lake Tanganyika near Gitaza.

== Environment ==
The area around the Kirasa river is densely populated, with 276 inhabitants per square kilometer as of 2016. The climate in the area is temperate. The average annual temperature is 18 °C (64 °F). The warmest month is July, when the average temperature is 21 °C (70 °F), and the coldest is November, with 14 °C (57 °F). Average annual rainfall is 1,304 millimetres (51.3 in). The rainiest month is December, with an average of 200 millimetres (7.9 in) of precipitation, and the driest is July, with 15 millimetres (0.59 in) of precipitation.

== Events ==
In May 2021 torrential rains caused the bridge carrying the RN3 road over the Kirasa River to collapse. It linked the Kabezi Commune in Bujumbura Rural Province, with the Muhata Commune in Rumonge Province. The bridge was damaged beyond repair, so a new one had to be built. In the interim, passengers travelling between Bujumbura and Rumonge would have to disembark and cross the river on foot.

In April 2024 a landslide that ran down the Kirasa River destroyed 497 houses and more than 500 hectares (1,200 acres) of crop fields in Gabaniro village, Gitaza zone, Muhuta district in Rumonge Province. It seriously damaged the Kirasa hydropower dam that provides electricity to the town of Mutamba in Muhuta District and destroyed the buildings that would hold Kirasa Energy's new hydropower station.

== Hydroelectric project ==
Kirasa Energy signed a contract with the government of Burundi in October 2019 to develop and transfer two cascade hydroelectric power plants on the Kirasi River with a combined capacity of 16MW. The company asked for financing from the African Development Bank and the Trade Development Bank. In December 2022 Kirasa Energy issued a notice of expression of interest for international consultant services to monitor and control the construction project.

There would be a dam on the river between the Rutovu and Higiro collines, and a dam on its left (south) tributary the Ginge River in the Gihondo colline. Both would feed a conduit leading to a 9.5MW hydroelectric power station below the junction of the Kirasa and Ginge. Further down there would be a dam in the Nigera colline feeding a conduit leading to a 6.5MW hydroelectric power station near the mouth of the river.

== See also ==
- List of rivers of Burundi

== Sources ==
- "Landslide kills child, destroys nearly 500 houses, hydropower dam in west Burundi", Xinhua, 21 April 2024
- Le projet: En quoi consiste-il ? (in French), Kirasa Energy
- NASA Earth Observations: Population Density, NASA/SEDAC, archived from the original on 9 February 2016
- NASA Earth Observations Data Set Index, NASA, archived from the original on 11 May 2020 Temperature data from satellite measurements of the earth's surface temperature within a box that is 0.1 x 0.1 degrees.
- NASA Earth Observations: Rainfall (1 month - TRMM), NASA/Tropical Rainfall Monitoring Mission, archived from the original on 11 May 2020 Average value for the years 2012–2014 within a box that is 0.1 x 0.1 degrees.
- Nyandwi, Dieudonné (7 May 2021), "Effondrement du pont Kirasa, le ministère en charge des infrastructures interpellé", Radio Télévision Nationale du Burundi (in French)
- Projet de développement, construction, exploitation et transfert de deux centrales hydroélectriques en cascades de puissance totale installée de 16 MW sur la rivière Kirasa-Burundi (in French), Kirasa Energy, 27 January 2023
- "Un pont s'est effondré sur la rivière KIRASA", AGnews (in French), 7 May 2021
