= Mubarazi River =

River in Burundi

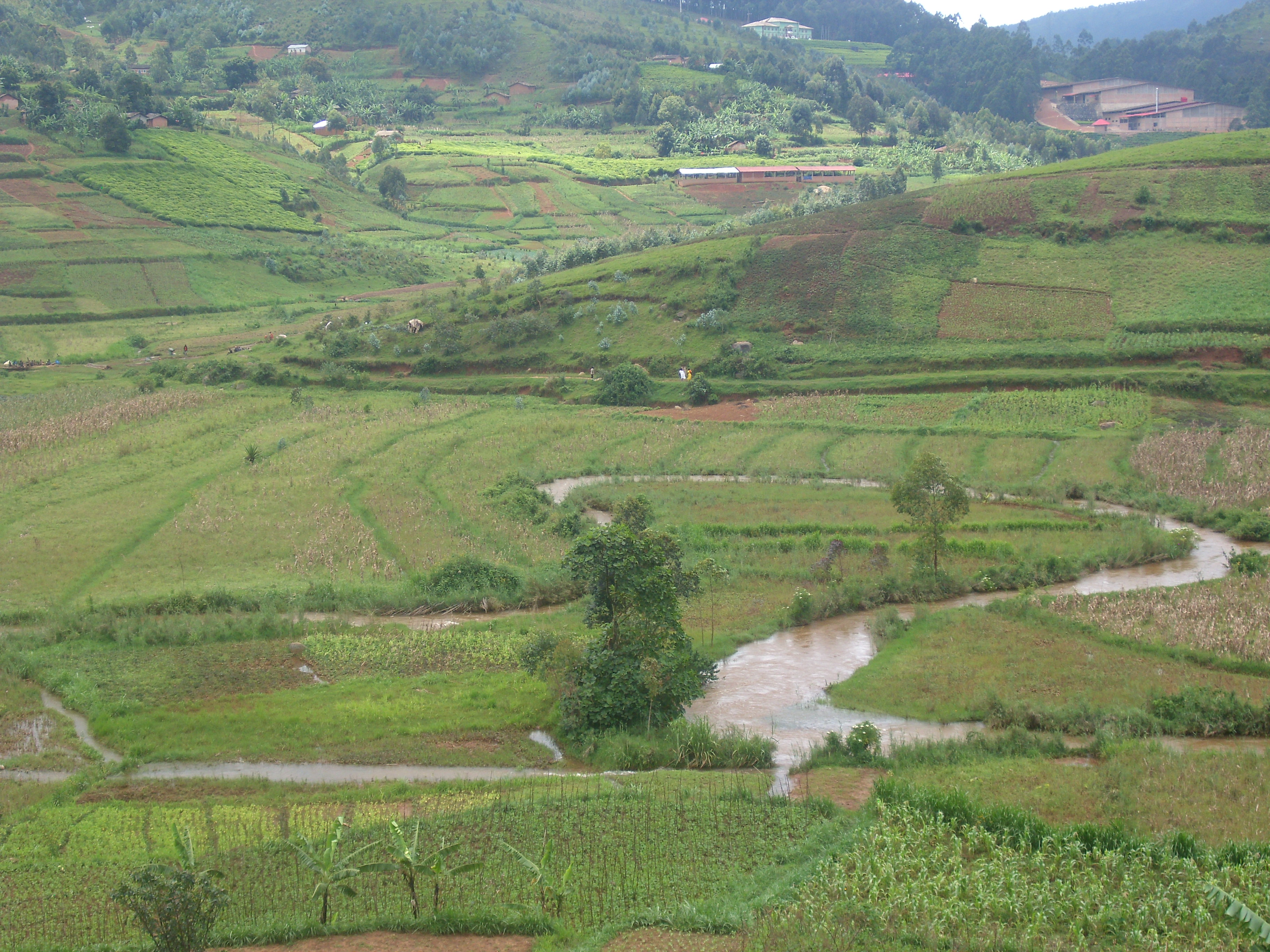

- Location within Burundi
- Native name: Rivière Mubarazi (French)

Location
- Country: Burundi

Physical characteristics
- Source
  - location: Bujumbura Rural Province
  - coordinates: 3.5290°S 29.5434°E
  - elevation: 2,469 m (8,100 ft)
- Mouth: Ruvubu River
  - location: Gitega Province
  - coordinates: 3.180805°S 29.92297°E
  - elevation: 1,485 m (4,872 ft)
- Length: 89.3 km (55.5 mi)
- Basin size: 950.6 km^{2} (367.0 sq mi)
- Discharge
  - location: Mouth
  - average: 8.74 m^{3} (308.6 cu ft)
  - minimum: 2.22 m^{3} (78.50 cu ft)
  - maximum: 18.85 m^{3} (665.8 cu ft)

Basin features
- Progression: Rurubu → Kagera → Lake Victoria → White Nile → Nile → Mediterranean Sea
- Population: 419,760 (2016)
- Tributaries
  - right: Kaniga River

The Mubarazi River (French: Rivière Mubarazi) is a river in Burundi, a major tributary of the Ruvubu River.

== Course ==
The Mubarazi River rises in Bujumbura Rural Province to the east of Rukina. It flows southeast, then northeast, then north into Muramvya Province to the west side of Muramvya, where it turns east around the north of the town. Just east of Muramvya it powers the Gikonge Hydroelectric Power Station. It continues southeast and then east to the border with Gitega Province, defining the Muramvya-Gitega border for some distance. It flows northeast through Gitega Province past Murongwe to join the Ruvubu River.

== Environment ==
The surroundings of the lower Mubarazi are a mosaic of agricultural land and natural vegetation. The area is densely populated, with 369 inhabitants per square kilometer. Savannah climate prevails in the area. The average annual temperature in the area is 20 °C (68 °F). The warmest month is August, when the average temperature is 22 °C (72 °F), and the coldest is April, with 18 °C (64 °F). Average annual rainfall is 1,149 millimetres (45.2 in). The wettest month is December, with an average of 175 millimetres (6.9 in) of precipitation, and the driest is July, with 1 millimetre (0.039 in) of precipitation.

== Natural regions ==
The catchment area of the upper section of the river is in the Mugamba natural region and Bututsi natural region, and includes tributaries such as the Karuyenzi and Kigezi rivers. It slopes steeply down the Congo-Nile ridge to the central plateau, where it slows down. Downstream it flows through the Kirimiro natural region. In its lower section it is joined by the Munyinya river. This region is heavily cultivated. An irrigation dam on the river contains the Mubarazi-Kaniga rice marshes, which cover about 130 hectares (320 acres) and can produce almost 1,000 tons of rice.

== Events ==
In July 2016 Jean Bigirimana, an investigative journalist with Iwacu, was arrested by agents thought to be from the National Intelligence Agency and disappeared. In August that year, two bodies in advanced decomposition were found in the Mubarazi River near the place where Bigirimana went missing. However, his wife confirmed that neither was Bigirimana.

In December 2019 heavy rains caused the Mubarazi River to break its banks and flood roads and crops.

== See also ==
- List of rivers of Burundi

== Sources ==
- "Burundi – Heavy Rain Triggers Deadly Landslides in Cibitoke Province", Floodlist, 6 December 2019
- "Burundi: Two years on and no word on forcibly disappeared journalist Jean Bigirimana", La Libre Afrique, 26 July 2018
- "Les travaux de sarclage et d'application des engrais chimiques dans les champs de riz des marais de Mubarazi-Kaniga appréciés à plus de 80%", Agence Burundaise de Presse (in French), 21 March 2024
- Nahimana, Louis; Ntakarutimana, Vestine; Habonimana, Laurent; Nyandwi, Rénovat; Emmanuella Ngenzebuhoro; Faustin Harumukiza; Astère Nindamutsa; Régis Niyongabo; Désiré Baranyikwa; Fidèle Niyoyahagera; Elias Havyarimana; Emmanuel Hitimana; Christian Hatungimana (2010), Analysis of the Nature of the Sediments Load in the Nile Basin, Burundi Case (PDF), University of Burundi
- NASA Earth Observations Data Set Index, NASA, archived from the original on 7 April 2019 Temperature data from satellite measurements of the earth's surface temperature within a box that is 0.1×0.1 degrees.
- NASA Earth Observations: Population Density, NASA/SEDAC, archived from the original on 9 February 2016
- NASA Earth Observations: Rainfall (1 month - TRMM), NASA/Tropical Rainfall Monitoring Mission, archived from the original on 19 April 2019 Average value for the years 2012–2014 within a box that is 0.1×0.1 degrees.
- NASA Earth Observations: Land Cover Classification, NASA/MODIS, archived from the original on 28 February 2016
- "Way: Centrale hydroélectrique Gikonge (304015929)", OpenStreetMap
- "Way: Mubarazi (308663637)", OpenstreetMap
- "Way: Mubarazi (526451722)", OpenStreetMap
