= Ndurumu River (Ruvubu) =

River in Burundi

- Location within Burundi
- Native name: Rivière Ndurumu (French)

Location
- Country: Burundi
- Province: Karuzi Province

Physical characteristics
- Mouth: Ruvubu River
  - coordinates: 3.247455°S 30.028135°E

The Ndurumu River (French: Rivière Ndurumu) is a river in Karuzi Province, Burundi. It is a left tributary of the Ruvubu River.

== Course ==
The Ndurumu River rises in the north of Karuzi Province and flows south past Buhiga and Karuzi, then south-southwest parallel to the RN 12 highway down to the border with Gitega Province, where it joins the Ruvubu River. It is one of the main tributaries of the Ruvubu.

== Environment ==
The surroundings of the Ndurumu River are a mosaic of farmland and natural vegetation. The area is quite densely populated, with 239 inhabitants per square kilometer as of 2016. The average annual temperature in the area is 20 °C (68 °F). The warmest month is September, when the average temperature is 23 °C (73 °F), and the coldest is April, with 18 °C (64 °F). Average annual rainfall is 1,321 millimetres (52.0 in). The rainiest month is December, with an average of 215 millimetres (8.5 in) of precipitation, and the driest is July, with 1 millimetre (0.039 in) of precipitation.

== Power Station ==
The Buhiga Hydroelectric Power Station is on the Ndurumu River, near the town of Buhiga. The power station has a hydraulic head of 26 metres (85 ft) and installed power of 220 kW using an Ossberger turbine. A concrete masonry gravity dam diverts water from the upper Ndurumu River into the intake and settling area. From there, it flows through a 440 metres (1,440 ft) power canal, then down a steel penstock to the turbogenerator.

== See also ==
- List of rivers of Burundi

== Sources ==
- Etude d’Impact Environnemental et Social des sous-projets du 5ème portefeuille du PTPGU (PDF) (in French), Ministere des transports, des travaux publics et de l’equipement, September 2013
- NASA Earth Observations: Population Density, NASA/SEDAC, archived from the original on 9 February 2016
- NASA Earth Observations Data Set Index, NASA, archived from the original on 11 May 2020
- NASA Earth Observations: Rainfall (1 month - TRMM), NASA/Tropical Rainfall Monitoring Mission, archived from the original on 11 May 2020
- NASA Earth Observations: Land Cover Classification, NASA/MODIS, archived from the original on 28 February 2016
- "Way: Ndurumu (315549515)", OpenStreetMap
- Zimmermann, Robert; Inversin, Allen (February 1983), Burundi. Institutional requirements and technical alternatives for a small hydropower program (PDF), United States Agency for International Development, archived from the original (PDF) on February 27, 2017
