= Marangara Hydroelectric Power Station =

Power station in Burundi

- Location within Burundi
- Official name: French: Centrale Hydroélectrique de Marangara
- Country: Burundi
- Location: Ngozi Province
- Coordinates: 2.73035°S 29.964927°E
- Purpose: Power
- Owner: REGIDESO Burundi

Dam and spillways
- Impounds: Ndurumu River (Akanyaru)

Power Station
- Installed capacity: 280 kW

Marangara Hydroelectric Power Station (French: Centrale Hydroélectrique de Marangara) is an 280 kilowatts (380 hp) run-of-the-river hydroelectric power station in the Ngozi Province of Burundi.

== History ==
Marangara was inaugurated in 1986, producing 280 kW of power. The station has two Francis Turbines. It originally supplied electricity to the communes of Marangara, Ntega and Kirundo.

In 2007 it was expected that the Marangara (280 kW), Buhiga (240 kW) and Kayenzi (800 kW) power plants would soon by connected to the national grid through the Musasa substation, which would be connected by a 30 kV line to the Ngozi substation. The project was financed by the Programme de réhabilitation du Burundi (PREBU).

Farmers were compensated to move off the land above the hydroelectric dams, but they returned and resumed farming after a few years. Farmers along the Ndurumu River cut down almost all the trees and planted crops such as cassava and banana. During heavy rainfall tons of earth, stones and trees are washed into the valley, digging huge furrows and forming a mountain of mud and stones in the reservoir.

Marangara was shut down for most of 2016. That year the two alternators were rewound.

In 2012 the station produced 1,393,836 Kwh. In 2021 it supplied 306,480 Kwh. By 2024 the Rwegura Hydroelectric Power Station was supplying Ntega and Kirundo, and Marangara was only serving the commune of Marangara. Erosion waste was deposited in the supply channels and sometimes stuck to the turbines, causing damage. In April 2024 the power station had been out of service for three months. Technicians from REGIDESO Burundi had been unable to repair the turbines. As of June 2024 the Marangara Hydroelectric Power Station had not reopened.

== See also ==
- List of power stations in Burundi

== Sources ==
- Bizimana, Arthur (28 June 2024), "Climat et agriculture : une double menace pour la production hydroélectrique burundaise", Ibehe
- Projet d’appui aux projets PMIEE et PURSE de la Regideso et au Proseceau (PDF) (in French), REGIDESO, November 2013
- Rapport Annuel 2016 (PDF) (in French), Regideso
- Study on the interconnection of the electricity networks of the Nile equatorial lakes countries (PDF), vol. 1 – Power supply and demand analysis, NELSAP, October 2007
