= Mugere Hydroelectric Power Station =

Power station in Burundi

- Location within Burundi
- Official name: French: Centrale Hydroélectrique de Mugere
- Country: Burundi
- Location: Bujumbura Rural Province
- Coordinates: 3.49102°S 29.414786°E
- Purpose: Power
- Owner: REGIDESO Burundi

Power Station
- Turbines: 4 x 2 MW
- Installed capacity: 8 megawatts (11,000 hp)
- Annual generation: 40 GWh

MugereHydroelectric Power Station (French: Centrale Hydroélectrique de Mugere) is an 8 megawatts (11,000 hp) run-of-the-river hydroelectric power station in the Bujumbura Rural Province of Burundi.

== Location ==
The 8 MW Mugere Hydroelectric Power Station is in the Commune of Kabezi, Bujumbura Rural Province. It is along the Mugere River. The plant is south of Bujumbura. It contains four 2-MW units. It delivers 40 GWh per year. The original purpose of the plant was to provide power to a Chinese textile mill and to Bujumbara.

== Construction and rehabilitation ==
The Mugere plant was the first hydroelectric plant in Burundi. The government of China financed its original construction in the late 1970s and early 1980s. It was commissioned in 1982. A 35 kV line was built in 1982 linking the Mugere hydroelectric plant to Bujumbura.

Successive rehabilitation projects were undertaken with Chinese financing in 1987, 1993, 2000 and 2009–2010. The 2009–2010 project was undertaken by Hebei Hydraulic Engineering Bureau, China First Highway Engineering Company and China Road and Bridge Corporation, and was handed over on November 15, 2010.

As of 2010 the power station provided almost 30% of the electricity supplied to the city of Bujumbura, and 40% of the hydroelectric capacity of the state-owned water and power utility Regideso, Burundi. The output of the Mugere hydroelectric generating station drops considerably in the dry season since it has no reservoir to store water, but relies on the river flow.

== See also ==
- List of power stations in Burundi

== Sources ==
- Nsabimana, René (14 September 2020), "Electricity Sector Organization and Performance in Burundi", Proceedings of The First World Energies Forum—Current and Future Energy Issues, doi:10.3390/WEF-06938
- Nsabimana, René (September 2022), Quality of service and access to electricity in Burundi and East Africa, a comparison of sector performance (PDF) (Dissertation), University of Liège
- "Project ID: 825 Chinese Government provides RMB 30 million grant for Fourth Phase of 8MW Mugere Hydroelectric Power Plant Rehabilitation Project", Aiddata, William & Mary
- Reynolds, Patrick (16 May 2013), "African leap", International Water Power
- Ruzizi II Regional Hydroelectric Power Project (PDF), World Bank, 5 May 1983
- Zimmermann, Robert; Inversin, Allen (February 1983), Burundi. Institutional requirements and technical alternatives for a small hydropower program (PDF), National Rural Electric Cooperative Association, archived from the original (PDF) on February 27, 2017
