= Ruzibazi River =

River in Burundi

- Location within Burundi
- Native name: French: Rivière Ruzibazi

Location
- Country: Burundi
- Province: Bujumbura Rural Province, Bururi Province, Rumonge Province

Physical characteristics
- Mouth
  - location: Lake Tanganyika
  - coordinates: 3.73170°S 29.31350°E

The Ruzibazi River (French: Rivière Ruzibazi) is a river in Burundi.

== Course ==
The RuziBazi River rises to the east of Mukike on the border between Bujumbura Rural Province and Bururi Province. It flows along this border in a generally south-southeast direction to the border between Rumonge Province and Bururi Province, which it defines for a short distance, then turns west and flows to its mouth on Lake Tanganyika, which it enters to the south of Magara.

== Environment ==
The surroundings of the Ruzibazi River are a mosaic of agricultural land and natural vegetation. The area is quite densely populated, with 207 inhabitants per square kilometer as of 2016. The climate in the area is temperate. The average annual temperature is 19 °C (66 °F). The warmest month is July, when the average temperature is 22 °C (72 °F), and the coldest is November, with 14 °C (57 °F). Average annual rainfall is 1,304 millimetres (51.3 in). The rainiest month is December, with an average of 200 millimetres (7.9 in) of precipitation, and the driest is July, with 15 millimetres (0.59 in) of precipitation.

The Monge Forest Nature Reserve contains a remnant of natural Afro-montane forest on the hills of the southern extension of the Congo-Nile ridge, covering parts of the communes of Mukike, Muhuta and Bugarama. Some of the streams flow into the Ruzibazi River, while others flow into the Nile Basin.

== Hydroelectricity ==
The 15MW Ruzibazi Hydroelectric Power Station is in Rutumo colline, Minago zone in the Commune of Rumonge. The dam is on the Ruzibazi River between the Commune of Bugarama and the Commune of Rumonge. Construction by the Chinese company Sinohydro began in October 2018 and was completed ahead of schedule in July 2022. It was inaugurated on 6 September 2022 in a ceremony attended by Evariste Ndayishimiye, President of Burundi.

== See also ==
- List of rivers of Burundi

== Sources ==
- NASA Earth Observations: Population Density, NASA/SEDAC, archived from the original on 9 February 2016
- NASA Earth Observations Data Set Index, NASA, archived from the original on 11 May 2020 Temperature data from satellite measurements of the earth's surface temperature within a box that is 0.1 x 0.1 degrees.
- NASA Earth Observations: Rainfall (1 month - TRMM), NASA/Tropical Rainfall Monitoring Mission, archived from the original on 19 April 2019 Average value for the years 2012–2014 within a box that is 0.1 x 0.1 degrees.
- NASA Earth Observations: Land Cover Classification, NASA/MODIS, archived from the original on 28 February 2016
- Niyonkuru, Apollinaire (December 2019), Cartes georeferencees des reserves naturelles forestieres de Monge, de Nkayamba, de Rumonge, de Kigwena et de Vyanda (PDF) (in French), United Nations Food and Agriculture Organization
- Ntahondi, Nathan (8 September 2022), "Province de Rumonge : Le chef de l'Etat inaugure la centrale hydroélectrique de Ruzibazi", Le Renouveau
- "Relation: Ruzibazi (17502778)", OenStreetMap
