= Interpetrol Burundi =

Interpetrol Burundi SA
- Industry: Petrol import, distribution and sale
- Founder: Taruk Bashir
- Headquarters: Bujumbura, Burundi
- Area served: Burundi
- Headquarters (Burundi)

Interpetrol Burundi S.A. is a Bujumbura-based company that imports and sells petrol in Burundi.

== Origins and growth ==
Interpetrol was founded in the early 1990s by Taruk Bashir, a businessman born in Burundi to an Indo-Pakistani family who had dual Burundian and Tanzanian citizenship. In 1996 Interpetrol bought the wheat flour mill in Muramvya, built by the government in 1978 and privatized in 1992. Interpetrol renovated the machinery, and the mill resumed operations in 2000 under the name of MINOLACS.

Interpetrol Bujumbura supplied oil to Burundi during the years of Burundian Civil War and during the economic embargo of 1996–2000. In 1997 the Société Interpetrol was allowed access to foreign exchange as it was considered an enterprise of national interest. Interpetrol SARL, a subsidiary, was established in Lubumbashi, Democratic Republic of the Congo around 2008.

In June 2012 the Ministry of Trade cut the number of companies allowed to import fuel into Burundi from 63 to ten, removing inactive companies. The ten were OCOGES, Burundi Petroleum, Mogas Burundi, Delta Petroleum Burundi, EBS Petroleum, Engen Petroleum Burundi, MP, IMMATCO, Interpetrol and Kobil Burundi.

Through his relationship with Pierre Nkurunziza, President of Burundi until 2020, Taruk Bashir managed to obtain a quasi-monopoly in oil distribution in Burundi. In May 2017 Engen Petroleum of South Africa, a subsidiary of Malaysian parastatal Petronas, said it had sold its Burundi assets to Interpetrol. By 2022 the company had 450 tankers among other vehicles, storage centers, gas stations, and agreements to supply petrol to other retailers.

== Embezzlement case ==
In August 2007 Isaac Bizimana, Governor of the Bank of the Republic of Burundi, was arrested for embezzlement and jailed in Bujumbura Central Prison. The case involved reimbursement to Interpetrol for losses incurred before 2002. It was claimed that the Burundian State paid the same bill three times. Other senior figures were said to be involved, including the former Minister of Finance, Denise Sinankwa. Bizimana was later released without charges. The public treasury lost over US$10 million. A 2011 report by the U.S. State Department said that judges had been pressured to drop corruption charges against Munir and Tariq Bashir, owners of Interpetrol, by senior government officials.

== Supply issues ==
In 2013 there were almost 80,000 vehicles in Burundi. 13,305 newly registered vehicles were added in 2014 and 12,631 in 2015.

When Pierre Nkurunziza ran in 2015 for a third term as president of Burundi, donors cut aid payments, the economy shrank and there was a shortage of dollars needed pay for fuel imports. In May 2017 severe shortages of fuel caused the government to introduce petrol rationing. Black market fuel prices were more than twice the official prices, food prices soared and commerce ground to a halt. An anti-corruption organization blamed the shortages on the central bank allocating most of the dollars for fuel imports to Interpetrol Trading Ltd.

In August 2019 the Council of Ministers, chaired by Pierre Nkurunziza, President of Burundi, decided to rehabilitate the Société d'Entreposage Pétrolier au Burundi (SEP Burundi) petrol storage facility in close collaboration with Interpetrol, now the sole shareholder and manager of SEP Burundi.

In November 2021 President Évariste Ndayishimiye instructed the Central Bank of Burundi to throttle the supply of foreign currency to Interpetrol and instead supply the money to a new cartel. The publicly owned power and water company Regideso was allowed import petrol. Prestige, a newly created private company, was also allowed to import petrol. However, these companies did not have trading connections, transport vehicles or storage facilities, so the result was severe shortages of fuel and soaring prices.

In April 2022 Interpetrol stated that the company had supplied 350,000 litres (77,000 imp gal; 92,000 US gal) of petrol per day at over 110 service stations for the last two weeks. The company was also distributing 400,000 to 500,000 litres (88,000 to 110,000 imp gal; 110,000 to 130,000 US gal) of fuel oil per day. In August 2022 President Ndayishimiye said he would address the persistent shortages of gasoline and heating oil. In October 2022 the president allowed the central bank to release more foreign currency to Interpetrol.

In June 2023 vehicles again had to wait at the gas stations for days before fuel was delivered. The president blamed "traitors to the nation" who travelled to Tanzania to buy petrol but only supplied it to members of their family when they returned. Others said the problem was a lack of foreign currency due to an extreme trade imbalance where Burundi goods worth more than five times their exports.

Presidential decree 100/034 of 20 February 2024 created the Société Pétroliere du Burundi (SOPEBU) a publicly owned company, under the Ministry of Energy. The company was to organize, coordinate and centralize Burundi's orders for oil products, establish a physical stock that would last at least three months, import oil and gas products and distribute oil products fairly to different parts of the country, among other duties. The license to import petroleum products was withdrawn from Interpetrol and awarded to Regideso.

In June 2024 a video was circulated on social media in which Freddy Ipoma, general director of Interpetrol, said the fuel shorage would soon end due to actions by Interpetrol and the President of Burundi. However, it turned out that the video was made in October 2022.

== Electrical power station ==
In 2017 Regideso signed a contract with Interpetrol to build and operate a thermal power plant. It was expected that the 30MW Interpetrol Power Station would be ready by September 2017, and Regideso would no longer have to practice "load shedding" power cuts. The contract with Interpetrol was for ten years. Regideso would pay Interpetrol about US$3.4 million per month for the electricity.

In April 2018 the Director General of Interpetrol Burundi threatened to suspend production, since Regideso had failed to make payments on schedule. He also noted that Regideso Burundi was only requesting about 20MW on average while the sale price was based on 30MW, which was causing Interpetrol to lose money. Regideso refuted these charges, complaining that Interpetrol was charging above the agreed price, which would cause huge losses to Regideso since its retail sales price was fixed.

== See also ==
- List of companies of Burundi
- Economy of Burundi

== Sources ==
- About us, Interpetrol SARL
- BEST Analysis: Burundi (PDF), USAID, January 2012, archived from the original (PDF) on February 7, 2017
- "Burundi: 10 importateurs de carburant pour 7 Millions de litre/mois", AGnews, 21 June 2012
- Burundi: A Deepening Corruption Crisis (PDF), International Crisis Group, 21 March 2012
- "Burundi : Achat de 30 MW pour 3.4 Millions USD par mois à Interpetrol", AGnews, 26 September 2017
- "Burundi: BRB Governor Arrested", BBC, 5 August 2007
- "Burundi: le président accuse les «traitres à la nation» d'être la cause de la pénurie de carburant", RFI (in French), France Médias Monde, 29 June 2023
- "Burundi Paralyzed by Fuel Shortages as Leaders Blame Lack of Dollars", VOA, 30 May 2017
- "Crise de carburant au Burundi : Non, la vidéo d'Interpetrol date de 2022", Le Mandat (in French), 22 June 2024
- Communique de presse de la reunion du conseil des ministres du mercredi 14 août 2019 (PDF), Burundi Council of Ministers
- Decret No100/034 du 20 fevrier 2024... (PDF) (in French), Burundi
- Gahama, Parfait (19 April 2018), "Interpetrol tire la sonnette d'alarme", Iwacu (in French)
- Grauvogel, Julia (September 2014), Regional Sanctions against Burundi (PDF), GIGA German Institute of Global and Area Studies
- Leclercq, Hubert (10 October 2022), "Burundi : Le président Ndayishimiye perd son bras de fer pétrolier", La Libre Afrique (in French), La Libre Belgique
- Maniragaba, Mélance (22 March 2024), "SOPEBU : est-ce une garantie !", Burundi Eco (in French)
- Manirakiza, Fabrice (9 June 2017), "«Nous espérons qu'en septembre cette centrale sera fonctionnelle.»", Iwacu (in French)
- Manirakiza, Fabrice (15 April 2022), "La société Interpetrol se dédouane", Iwacu (in French)
- Ndoricimpa, Arcade (November 2017), Analysis of Capital Flight from Burundi, Nairobi: African Economic Research Consortium
