= Commune of Ndava =

- Commune
- Location within Burundi
- Coordinates: 3°21′31″S 29°46′13″E
- Country: Burundi
- Province: Mwaro Province
- Administrative center: Ndava
- Time zone: UTC+2 (Central Africa Time)

The commune of Ndava is a commune of Mwaro Province in central Burundi. The capital lies at Ndava.
