= Murembwe River =

River in Burundi

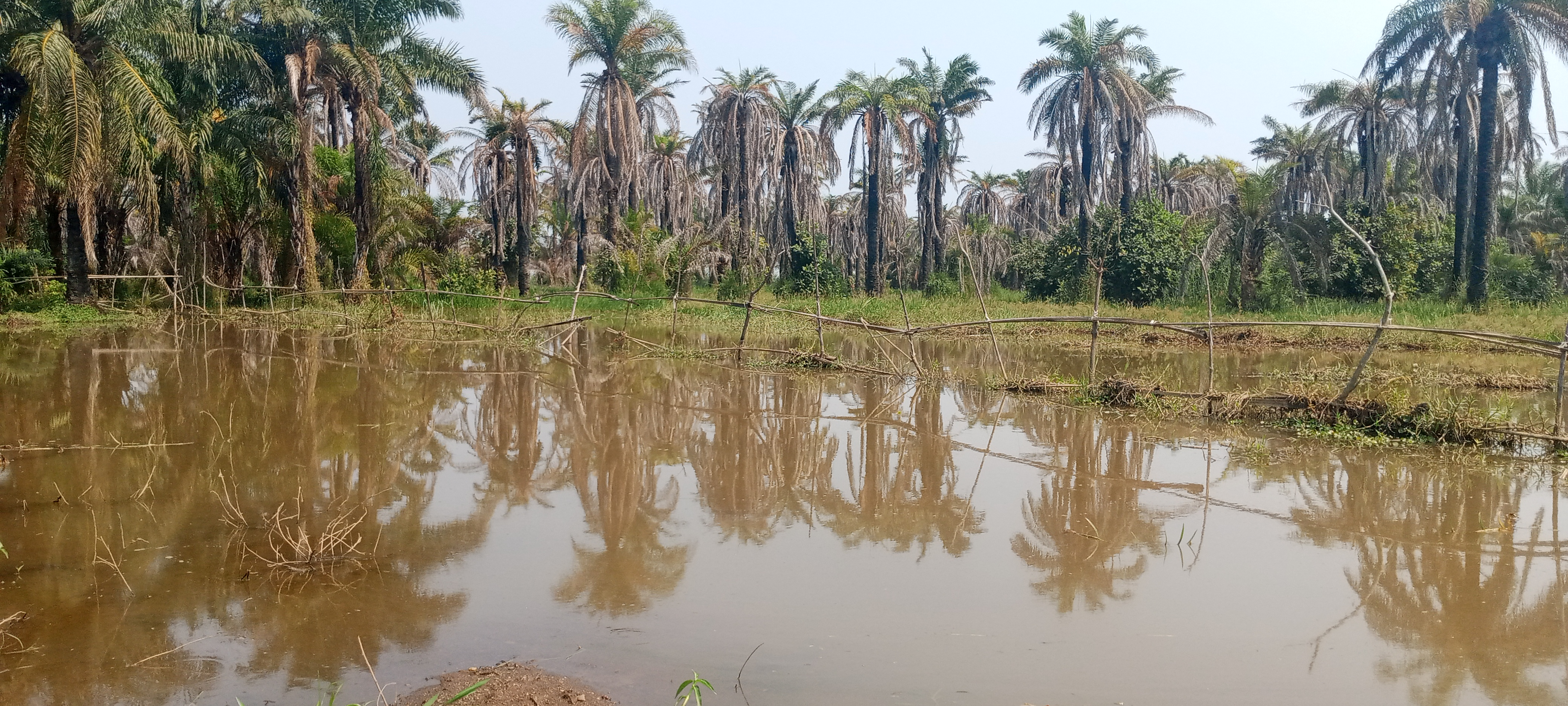
- Murembwe oil palms dying due to rising waters in Lake Tanganyika and the Murembwe River

- Location within Burundi
- Native name: Rivière Murembwe (French)

Location
- Country: Burundi
- Province: Bururi Province

Physical characteristics
- Mouth
  - location: Lake Tanganyika
  - coordinates: 4.01198°S 29.42969°E

The Murembwe River (French: Rivière Murembwe) is a river in Burundi.

== Course ==
The Murembwe watershed covers 950 square kilometres (370 sq mi). The river rises in the east of Rumonge Province and flows southwest and then southeast. It is joined from the east (left) by the Jiji River, which flows west to the north of the Bururi Forest Nature Reserve, and lower down by the Siguvyaye River. For most of its length, down to the point where it is joined by the Siguvyaye River, it defines the boundary between Rumonge Province and Bururi Province. From there it flows southeast to enter Lake Tanganyika after flowing through the palm plantations to the south of the city of Rumonge.

The river is polluted by palm oil production, coffee washing and household waste. Consumption of the river water causes cholera.

== Flooding ==
In April 2018 the Murembwe River Valley flooded and the crops were submerged, apart from oil palms. Some of the farmers were facing starvation. Floods in the rainy season had become common. Building levees along the river could help, but the head of protected areas in Southern Burundi suggested that the only solution was to reforest the river's watershed and to protect its banks. Farmers had destroyed bamboos planted on the banks to try to limit flood damage.

In December 2019 the river flooded the valley between it and Rumonge by up to 2 metres (6 ft 7 in), almost reaching the leaves of the oil palms. Fields of sweet potatoes, colcas and rice had been totally submerged. A new stream had emerged from the river that was threatening the Kanyenkoko district of the city of Rumonge.

In December 2023 the banks of the Murembwe River gave way and caused a major flood in the Murembwe palm plantations. Over 200 hectares (490 acres) of oil palm trees were flooded, and the palm trees had started to dry out. Hundreds of hectares of crop fields were flooded, bridges were destroyed, tracks were almost impassable, and landslides were widespread. Traffic on the RN3 highway was difficult, with flooding and large potholes. The Dama River surroundings experienced similar problems.

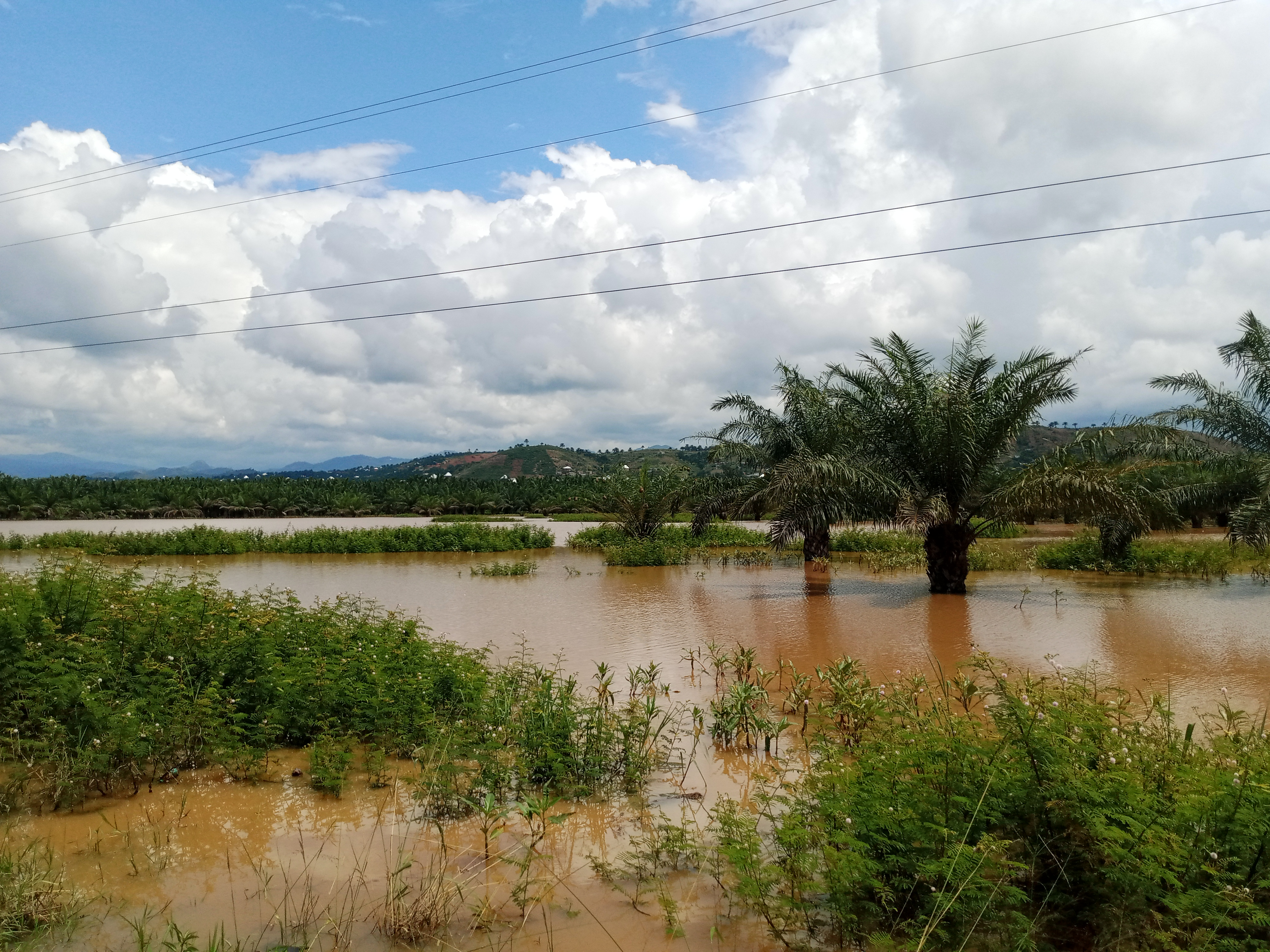
Flooding along the Murembwe River in 2024

In May 2024 hundreds of families in Rumonge, particularly the Kanyenkoko district, had to leave their homes due to flooding caused by water from the Murembwe River meeting rising water levels in Lake Tanganyika. Some families were housed in Rumonge Hospital, others had been placed in Mutambara and hundreds of others had rented houses. Fields of rice, cassava, banana and sweet potato along the river had also been flooded, and the palm groves had been damaged.

== Other events ==
In 2013 the Burundian government started a project to build hydroelectric dams on the Jiji and Murembwe rivers. Work began in 2020 after seven years of study. Alain-Guillaume Bunyoni, prime minister of Burundi, visited the sites in June 2021. He said work on the access roads was going well, work had started on the Jiji River and would start soon on the Murembwe River.

In December 2022 there were torrential rains in Muheka colline, below the Nyakigo colline, but officials of the ORASCOM company said the Jiji Murembwe Hydroelectric Power Station was not badly affected. The director general of REGIDESO Burundi asked ORASCOM to speed up the work.

== See also ==
- List of rivers of Burundi

== Sources ==
- "La centrale hydroélectrique de Jiji Murembwe restée en bon état malgré les aléas climatiques", Agence Burundaise de Presse (in French), 19 December 2022
- Hicintuka, Jean-Marie (29 December 2019), "Les champs des cultures sont menacés par la rivière Murembwe qui a inondé sa vallée", Agence Burundaise de Presse (in French)
- "La vallée de la rivière Murembwe de nouveau inondée", Isanganiro (in French), 11 April 2018
- Ndereyimana, Fidès (15 June 2021), "Construction des barrages Jiji et Murembwe : Malgré le retard constaté, les travaux avancent", Le Renouveau du Burundi
- Nzorubonanya, Félix (9 December 2023), "Région Sud/Rumonge-Muhuta : Au moins 4 personnes sont mortes, une dizaine blessée", Iwacu
- "Relation: Murembwe (17502786)", OpenStreetMap
- Roissart, Philippe de (August 2013), Développement de la gestion intégrée des ressources en eau (gire) dans la zone pilote Dama-Murembwe (PDF) (in French)
- "Rumonge : Les inondations forcent des centaines de familles à quitter leur foyer", Radio Publique Africaine, 9 May 2024
