= Kitenge River =

River in Burundi

- Location within Burundi
- Native name: French: Rivière Kitenge

Location
- Country: Burundi
- Province: Bubanza Province, Cibitoke Province

Physical characteristics
- Mouth: Kagunuzi River,
  - coordinates: 2.948608°S 29.427927°E

The Kitenge River, or Gitenge River, is a river in northwestern Burundi.

== Course ==
The Kitenge River forms above Lake Rwegura, the reservoir for the Rwegura Hydroelectric Power Station and flows in an overall west-southwest direction. It forms the boundary between Bubanza Province to the south and Cibitoke Province to the north. It is a tributary of the Kagunuzi River, which it joins from the right, which in turn is a tributary of the Ruzizi River.

== Hydroelectricity ==
Gitenge–Kagunuzi and the Kaburantwa River are important tributaries on the east side of the Ruzizi river, with an estimated total hydroelectric potential of about 100 MW. The Gitenge River provides power to the 18 MW Mugere Hydroelectric Power Station. The reservoir allows regulation of the Kitenge with a view to the establishment of other power plants downstream.

In 2011 the KItenge River above the Rwegura Dam Lake had dried up completely. Some said Eucalyptus trees planted around the lake were said to be consuming large amounts of water. Another explanation was that deforestation and tea plantations had reduced the ability of the land to absorb water in the rainy season and release through seepage it in the dry season. Regideso Burundi was employing at least 400 workers to dig a 8 kilometres (5.0 mi) canal so the Inamunyiriri River would flow into the lake.

== Sources ==
- Bizimana, Arthur (4 July 2024), "Climate and agriculture: a double threat to hydroelectric production in Burundi", Inside Burundi
- "Nouvelles locales du jeudi 15 septembre 2011", arib.info (in French)
- Rapport annuel 1982 (PDF) (in French), African Development Bank, May 1983
- Republic of Burundi Energy sector rehabilitation project (PDF), World Bank, 14 February 1991, archived from the original (PDF) on 2024-08-19
