= Dama River (Burundi) =

River in Burundi

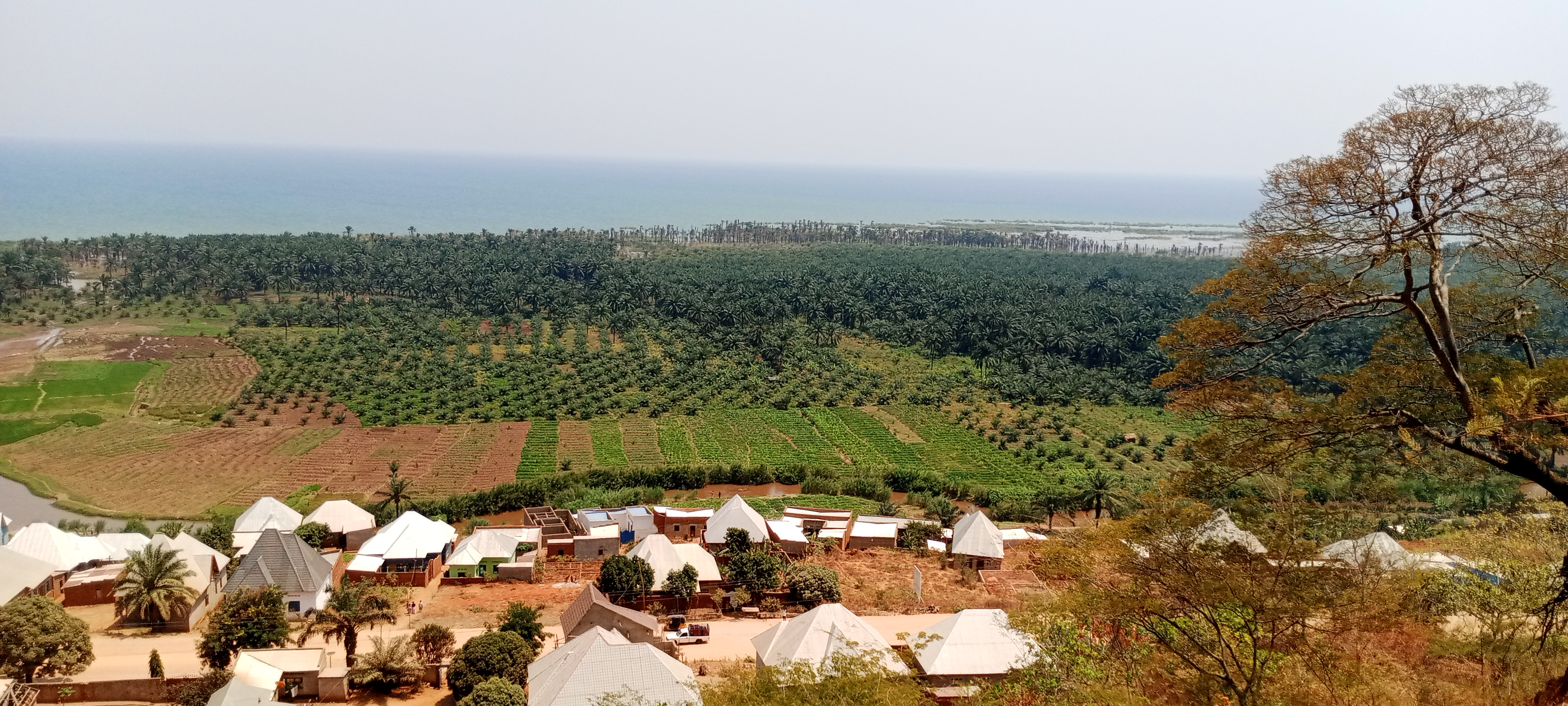
- Near the Nkayamba Forest Nature Reserve

- Location within Burundi
- Native name: Rivière Dama (French)

Location
- Country: Burundi
- Province: Bururi Province

Physical characteristics
- Mouth
  - location: Lake Tanganyika
  - coordinates: 3.96578°S 29.42052°E

The Dama River (French: Rivière Dama) is a river in Rumonge Province, Burundi.

== Course ==
The Dama River rises in central Rumonge Province near Magana, and flows south-southwest parallel to the Murembwe River, which is further east. It enters Lake Tanganyika just north of the city of Rumonge. There are large palm plantations along its lower reaches. The Dama watershed covers 295 square kilometres (114 sq mi).

== Environment ==
The average annual temperature in the area is 21 °C (70 °F). The warmest month is July, when the average temperature is 24 °C (75 °F), and the coldest is February, with 19 °C (66 °F). Average annual rainfall is 1,622 millimetres (63.9 in). The rainiest month is December, with an average of 270 millimetres (11 in) of precipitation, and the driest is July, with 7 millimetres (0.28 in) of precipitation.

== Issues ==
The river is polluted by palm oil production, coffee washing and household waste. Consumption of the river water causes cholera.

In December 2023 there were heavy rains in the region. Palm plantations and crop fields were flooded along the Dama and Murembwe rivers.

== See also ==
- List of rivers of Burundi

== Sources ==
- NASA Earth Observations Data Set Index, NASA, archived from the original on 11 May 2020 Temperature data from satellite measurements of the earth's surface temperature within a box that is 0.1 x 0.1 degrees.
- NASA Earth Observations: Rainfall (1 month - TRMM), NASA/Tropical Rainfall Monitoring Mission, archived from the original on 19 April 2019 Average value for the years 2012–2014 within a box that is 0.1 x 0.1 degrees.
- Nzorubonanya, Félix (9 December 2023), "Région Sud/Rumonge-Muhuta : Au moins 4 personnes sont mortes, une dizaine blessée", Iwacu
- "Relation: Dama (17502787)", OpenStreetMap
- Roissart, Philippe de (August 2013), Développement de la gestion intégrée des ressources en eau (gire) dans la zone pilote Dama-Murembwe (PDF) (in French)
