= Cross-flow turbine =

Water turbine

Diagram of a Cross-flow turbine 1 — air-venting valve 2 — distributor 3 — turbine casing (all thick grey) 4 — runner 5 — removable rear casing 6 — blades 7 — water flow 8 — shaft

A cross-flow turbine, Bánki-Michell turbine, or Ossberger turbine is a water turbine developed by the Australian Anthony Michell, the Hungarian Donát Bánki and the German Fritz Ossberger. Michell obtained patents for his turbine design in 1903, and the manufacturing company Weymouth made it for many years. Ossberger's first patent was granted in 1933 ("Free Jet Turbine" 1922, Imperial Patent No. 361593 and the "Cross Flow Turbine" 1933, Imperial Patent No. 615445), and he manufactured this turbine as a standard product. Today, the company founded by Ossberger which bears his name is the leading manufacturer of this type of turbine.

Unlike most water turbines, which have axial or radial flows, in a cross-flow turbine the water passes through the turbine transversely, or across the turbine blades. As with a water wheel, the water is admitted at the turbine's edge. After passing to the inside of the runner, it leaves on the opposite side, going outward. Passing through the runner twice provides additional efficiency. When the water leaves the runner, it also helps clean it of small debris and pollution. The cross-flow turbine is a low-speed machine that is well suited for locations with a low head but high flow.

Although the illustration shows one nozzle for simplicity, most practical cross-flow turbines have two, arranged so that the water flows do not interfere.

Cross-flow turbines are often constructed as two turbines of different capacity that share the same shaft. The turbine wheels are the same diameter, but different lengths to handle different volumes at the same pressure. The subdivided wheels are usually built with volumes in ratios of 1∶2. The subdivided regulating unit, the guide vane system in the turbine's upstream section, provides flexible operation, with 33, 66 or 100 % output, depending on the flow. Low operating costs are obtained with the turbine's relatively simple construction.

== Details of design ==
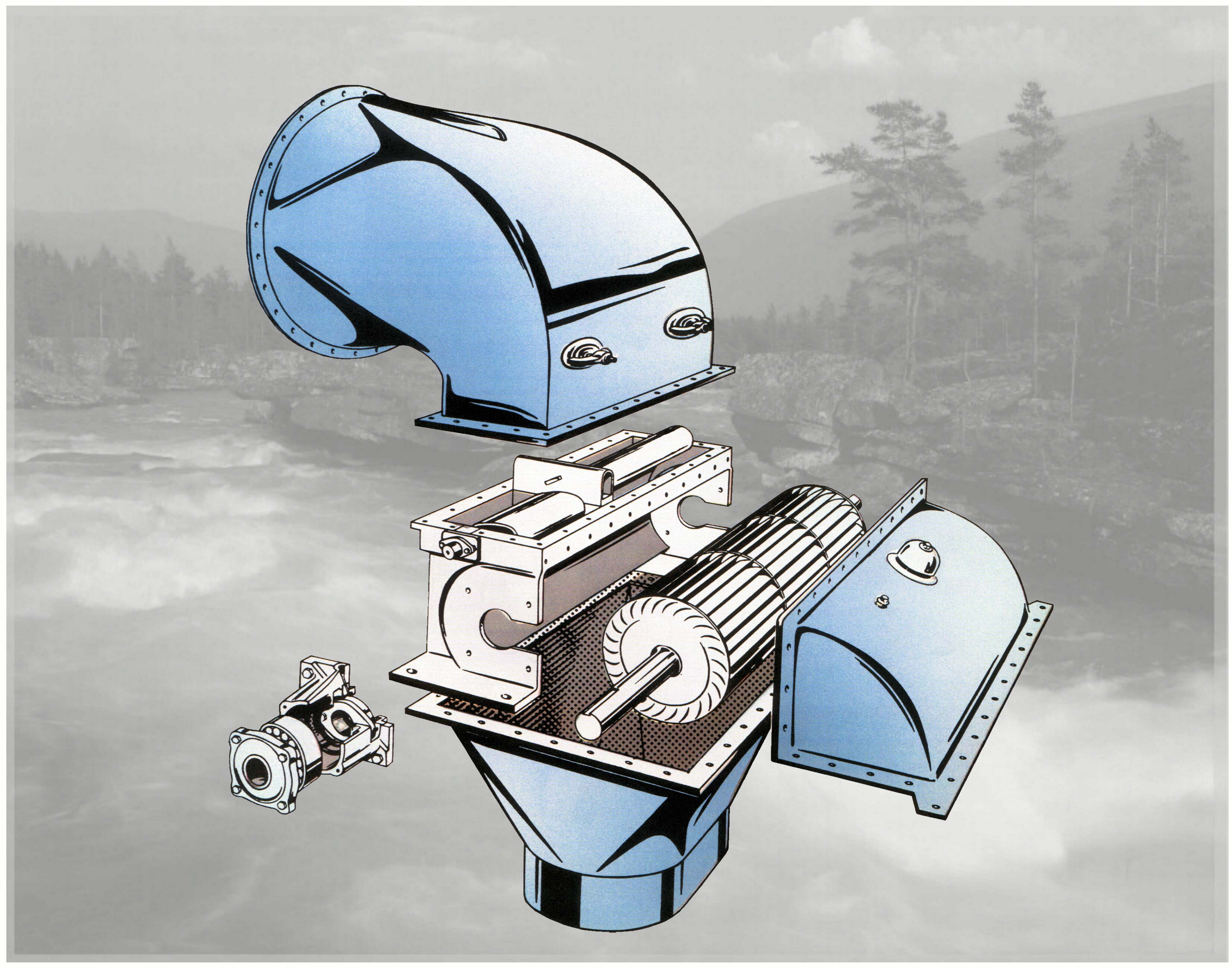
Ossberger turbine section

The turbine consists of a cylindrical water wheel or runner with a horizontal shaft, composed of numerous blades (up to 37), arranged radially and tangentially. The blade's edges are sharpened to reduce resistance to the flow of water. A blade is made in a part-circular cross-section (pipe cut over its whole length). The ends of the blades are welded to disks to form a cage like a hamster cage and are sometimes called "squirrel cage turbines"; instead of the bars, the turbine has the trough-shaped steel blades.

The water flows first from the outside of the turbine to its inside. The regulating unit, shaped like a vane or tongue, varies the cross-section of the flow. The water jet is directed towards the cylindrical runner by nozzle. The water enters the runner at an angle of about 45/120 degrees, transmitting some of the water's kinetic energy to the active cylindrical blades.

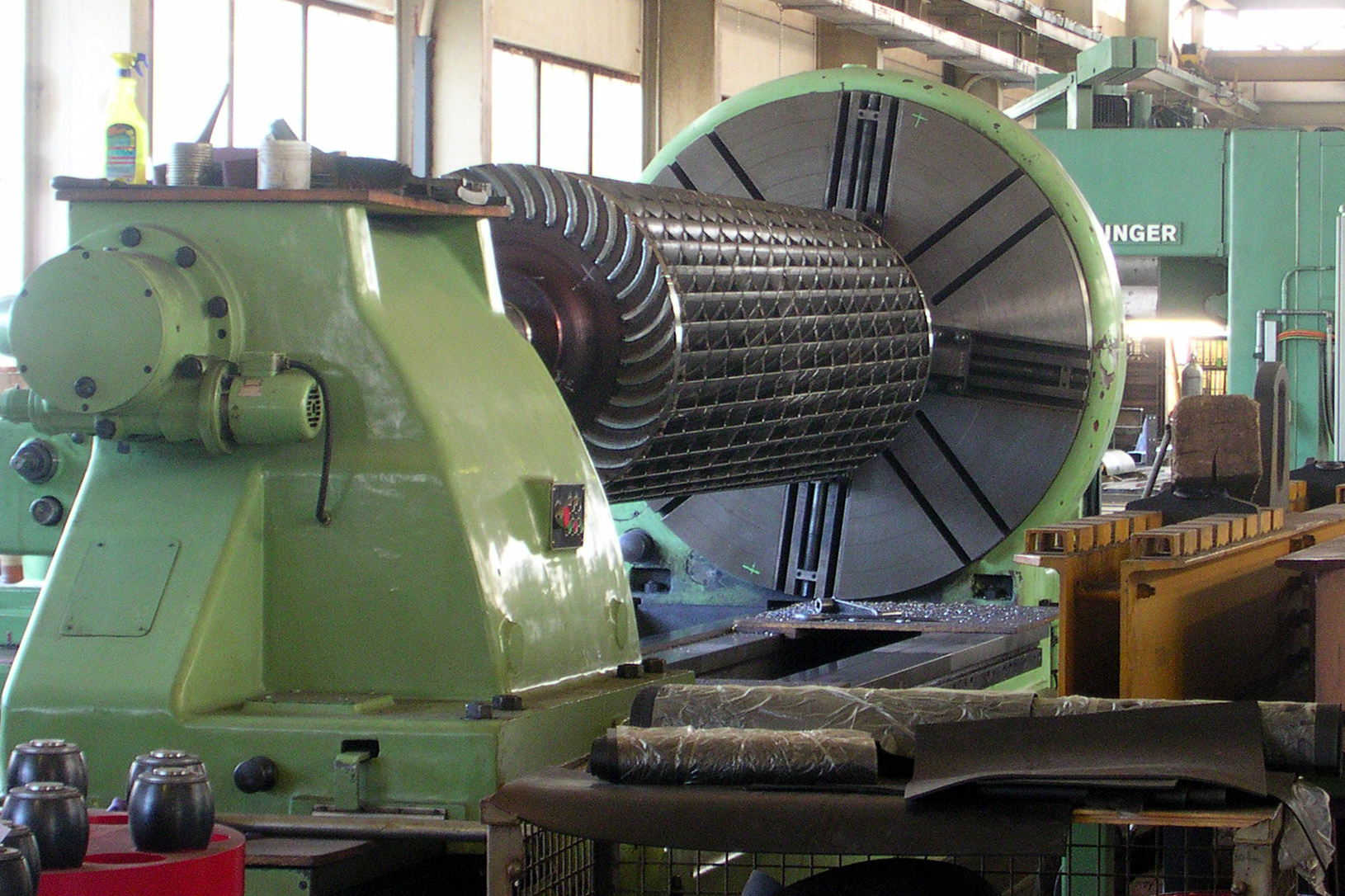
Ossberger turbine runner

The regulating device controls the flow based on the power needed, and the available water. The ratio is that (0–100%) of the water is admitted to 0-100%×30/4 blades. Water admission to the two nozzles is throttled by two shaped guide vanes. These divide and direct the flow so that the water enters the runner smoothly for any width of opening. The guide vanes should seal to the edges of the turbine casing so that when the water is low, they can shut off the water supply. The guide vanes therefore act as the valves between the penstock and turbine. Both guide vanes can be set by control levers, to which an automatic or manual control may be connected.

The turbine geometry (nozzle-runner-shaft) assures that the water jet is effective. The water acts on the runner twice, but most of the power is transferred on the first pass, when the water enters the runner. Only 1/3 of the power is transferred to the runner when the water is leaving the turbine.

The water flows through the blade channels in two directions: outside to inside, and inside to outside. Most turbines are run with two jets, arranged so two water jets in the runner will not affect each other. It is, however, essential that the turbine, head and turbine speed are harmonised.

The cross-flow turbine is of the impulse type, so the pressure remains constant at the runner.

== Advantages ==
The peak efficiency of a cross-flow turbine is somewhat less than a Kaplan, Francis or Pelton turbine. However, the cross-flow turbine has a flat efficiency curve under varying load. With a split runner and turbine chamber, the turbine maintains its efficiency while the flow and load vary from 1/6 to the maximum.

Since it has a low price, and good regulation, cross-flow turbines are mostly used in mini and micro hydropower units of less than one thousand kW and with heads less than 200 m (660 ft).

Particularly with small run-of-the-river plants, the flat efficiency curve yields better annual performance than other turbine systems, as small rivers' water is usually lower in some months. The efficiency of a turbine determines whether electricity is produced during the periods when rivers have low flows. If the turbines used have high peak efficiencies, but behave poorly at partial load, less annual performance is obtained than with turbines that have a flat efficiency curve.

Due to its excellent behaviour with partial loads, the cross-flow turbine is well-suited to unattended electricity production. Its simple construction makes it easier to maintain than other turbine types; only two bearings must be maintained, and there are only three rotating elements. The mechanical system is simple, so repairs can be performed by local mechanics.

Another advantage is that it can often clean itself. As the water leaves the runner, leaves, grass etc. will not remain in the runner, preventing losses. Therefore, although the turbine's efficiency is somewhat lower, it is more reliable than other types. No runner cleaning is normally necessary, e.g. by flow inversion or variations of the speed. Other turbine types are clogged more easily, and consequently face power losses despite higher nominal efficiencies.

== See also ==
- Water turbines
- Vertical axis wind turbines are sometimes called cross-flow turbines since the flow passes through the rotor transversely
- Gorlov helical turbine, in which the rotor axis is also positioned perpendicular to the flow
