= Siguvyaye River =

River in Burundi

- Location within Burundi
- Native name: Rivière Siguvyaye (French)

Location
- Country: Burundi
- Province: Bururi Province

Physical characteristics
- Mouth: Murembwe River
  - coordinates: 3.95199°S 29.51687°E

The Siguvyaye River (French: Rivière Siguvyaye) is a river in Burundi.

== Course ==
The Siguvyaye River rises near Nyagatovu in southern Bururi Province, and flows east–west through that province for its entire length. After passing south of the city of Bururi it flows through the southern end of the Bururi Forest Nature Reserve.

The Bururi forest is very humid, with plentiful Newtonia buchananii and Carapa grandiflora in the lower parts of the Siguvyaye River valley below 1,800 metres (5,900 ft). The waterfalls of the river and the beautiful surrounding landscapes are potential tourist attractions. However, tourists do not know about the waterfalls in part because of their inaccessibility, and in part because of lack of publicity.

Further down, the Siguvyaye River powers the Nyemanga Hydroelectric Power Station. The dam is maintained by water from the Bururi forest. The lowest section of the river forms the boundary between Bururi Province to the north and Rumonge Province to the south. At its mouth, the Siguvyaye River is a tributary of the Murembwe River.

== Environment ==
The surroundings of the Siguvyaye River are a mosaic of agricultural land and natural vegetation. The area is quite densely populated, with 166 inhabitants per square kilometer as of 2016. Savannah climate prevails in the area. The average annual temperature in the area is 20 °C (68 °F). The warmest month is September, when the average temperature is 22 °C (72 °F), and the coldest is December, with 18 °C (64 °F). Average annual rainfall is 1,137 millimetres (44.8 in). The wettest month is December, with an average of 199 millimetres (7.8 in) of precipitation, and the driest is July, with 1 millimetre (0.039 in) of precipitation.

== Events ==
In March 2022 it was reported that Tembo Power (Mauritius), an independent power producer, was looking for investors in two run-of-river hydroelectric power plants. The larger of the two would be in Sigu village and would harness the Siguvyaye River, generating 12.4 MW. The smaller would be on the Dama River in Rumonge Province and would generate 9.6 MW.

== See also ==
- List of rivers of Burundi

== Sources ==
- "Five Hydros Go to Rehab in Burundi", Alternative Energy Africa, 30 June 2009
- La province Bururi regorge plusieurs sites touristiques non aménagés (in French), Agence Burundaise de Presse, 28 September 2023
- NASA Earth Observations: Population Density, NASA/SEDAC, archived from the original on 9 February 2016
- NASA Earth Observations Data Set Index, NASA, archived from the original on 7 April 2019 Temperature data from satellite measurements of the earth's surface temperature within a box that is 0.1 x 0.1 degrees.
- NASA Earth Observations: Rainfall (1 month - TRMM), NASA/Tropical Rainfall Monitoring Mission, archived from the original on 19 April 2019 Average value for the years 2012–2014 within a box that is 0.1 x 0.1 degrees.
- NASA Earth Observations: Land Cover Classification, NASA/MODIS, archived from the original on 28 February 2016
- Plan régional de mise en œuvre de la Stratégie Nationale et Plan d’Action sur la Biodiversité en zones écologiques de Mumirwa et de la crête Congo-Nil (PDF) (in French), Bujumbura: Institut National pour l’Environnement et la Conservation de la Nature (INECN), November 2013
- "Relation: Suguvyaye (17502784)", OpenStreetMap
- Réserve Naturelle Forestière de Bururi (PDF) (in French), Office Burundais pour la Protection de l’Environnement
- Takouleu, Jean Marie (16 March 2022), "BURUNDI : Tembo Power recherche des partenaires pour deux centrales au fil de l'eau", Afrik 21 (in French)
