= Ndurumu River (Akanyaru) =

River in Burundi

- Location within Burundi
- Native name: Rivière Ndurumu (French)

Location
- Country: Burundi
- Province: Kirundo, Ngozi

Physical characteristics
- Source
  - location: Vumbi, Kirundo
  - coordinates: 2.678234°S 30.071870°E
  - elevation: 1,678 m (5,505 ft)
- Mouth: Akanyaru River
  - location: Marangara
  - coordinates: 2°39′47″S 29°55′50″E
  - elevation: 1,359 m (4,459 ft)
- Length: 22 km (14 mi)
- Basin size: 144.9 km^{2} (55.9 sq mi)
- Discharge
  - location: Mouth
  - average: 1.09 m^{3} (38.49 cu ft)
  - minimum: 0.353 m^{3} (12.47 cu ft)
  - maximum: 2.49 m^{3} (87.79 cu ft)

Basin features
- Progression: Akanyaru → Nyabarongo → Kagera → Lake Victoria → White Nile → Nile → Mediterranean Sea
- Population: 88,000

The Ndurumu River (French: Rivière Ndurumu) is a river in Burundi. It flows west through Kirundo Province and Ngozi Province to join the Akanyaru River on the border with Rwanda.

== Course ==
The Ndurumu River rises in the Ntega and Vumbi communes of Kirundo Province, and reaches its mouth in the Kiremba and Marangara communes of Ngozi Province. It flows in a generally west-southwest direction, turning west and then northwest at the Ndurumu Hydroelectric Station. The watershed of the Ndurumu River above the Marangara Hydroelectric Power Station is rugged, wth slopes between 5% and 55%.

== Environment ==
The surroundings of the Ndurumu River are mainly savannah. The area is densely populated, with 442 inhabitants per square kilometer. The climate in the area is temperate. The average annual temperature in the area is 19 °C (66 °F). The warmest month is August, when the average temperature is 22 °C (72 °F), and the coldest is May, with 17 °C (63 °F). Average annual rainfall is 1,170 millimetres (46 in). The wettest month is March, with an average of 178 millimetres (7.0 in) of precipitation, and the driest is July, with 1 millimetre (0.039 in) of precipitation.

== Agriculture ==
The climate is tropical humid, with average annual rainfall of 1,124.8 millimetres (44.28 in). More than 53.34% of the population of the watershed cultivate farms of less than 0.5 hectares (1.2 acres) and earn less than 100 dollars per year. Soil erosion is a serious problem.

In 2021 Enabel's Association for the Promotion of Education and Training Abroad (APEFE) launched a proposal for collaboration with the Programme d’Appui Institutionnel et Opérationnel au Secteur Agricole (PAIOSA) to rehabilitate the Muhembuzi marsh and the Ndurumu marsh in Bugesera.

== Hydroelectricity ==
As of June 2024 the Marangara Hydroelectric Power Station was at a standstill. Farmers upstream of the dam along the Ndurumu River had cut down almost all the trees and planted crops such as cassava and banana. During heavy rainfall tons of earth, stones and trees are washed into the valley, digging huge furrows and forming a mountain of mud and stones in the reservoir.

== See also ==
- List of rivers of Burundi

== Sources ==
- Bizimana, Arthur (28 June 2024), "Climat et agriculture : une double menace pour la production hydroélectrique burundaise", Ibehe
- NASA Earth Observations: Population Density, NASA/SEDAC, archived from the original on 9 February 2016
- NASA Earth Observations Data Set Index, NASA, archived from the original on 11 May 2020
- NASA Earth Observations: Rainfall (1 month - TRMM), NASA/Tropical Rainfall Monitoring Mission, archived from the original on 11 May 2020
- NASA Earth Observations: Land Cover Classification, NASA/MODIS, archived from the original on 28 February 2016
- Niyongabo, Jean Baptiste (6 April 2017), Analyse des déterminants de l'érosion différentielle dans les hautes terres du Burundi et proposition du plan de gestion durable du bassin versant de la rivière Ndurmu (PDF) (in French), Université Senghor
- Rapport de résultats 2021 (PDF), Enabel, 2022
