= Rwegura Hydroelectric Power Station =

Power station in Burundi

- Location within Burundi
- Official name: French: Centrale Hydroélectrique de Rwegura
- Country: Burundi
- Location: Cibitoke Province
- Coordinates: 2.93818°S 29.46338°E
- Purpose: Power
- Owner: REGIDESO Burundi

Power Station
- Turbines: 3 x 6 MW
- Installed capacity: 18 megawatts (24,000 hp)

Rwegura Hydroelectric Power Station (French: Centrale Hydroélectrique de Rwegura) is a 18 megawatts (24,000 hp) hydroelectric power station in the Cibitoke Province of Burundi.

== Development ==
The Rwegura dam and hydroelectric power station were funded by a loan from the African Development Bank. The project was approved on 29 September 1982, with a planned completion of 30 July 1988. It delivered 18 MW of power and had total production of 64 GWH. The Rwegura Dam impounds the Kitenge River (Note: Some sources give the river's name as Gitenge rather than Kitenge.), which flows from Kayanza Province. The lake is at an elevation of more than 2,000 metres (6,600 ft).

== Operations ==
The Rwegura Hydroelectric Power Station came into operation 1986. The plant supplies the surrounding region, the city of Bujumbura, Ngozi and Kayanza in the north of the country and the high-altitude tea plantations at Rwegura and Tora. The power station is operated by the Regie de Production et de Distribution d'Eau et d’Electricite (REGIDESO). At 18 MW, with three 6 MW turbine generators, it was the largest in the country in 2016 and produced half the Burundi's 32 MW total hydropower.

In September 2011 it was reported that the water level in the reservoir was well below the normal level. Normally the plant should produce 150 KWh per day, but it had been running at over 200 KWh per day to meet demand. As of August 2016 the reservoir had dropped by 3 metres (9.8 ft) during the year to date, but was expected to increase in September or October when the rainy season began.

Between 2016 and 2018 the plant only delivered 8 to 12 MW due to obsolete equipment and soil erosion affecting the dam capacity. In January 2017 the director general of REGIDESO told the press that the water level had dropped by 8 metres (26 ft) due to lack of rainfall, and the plant was only supplying 4 MW. The electricity users should be prepared for a long period of load shedding.

== See also ==
- List of power stations in Burundi

== Sources ==
- Burundi - Rwegura Hydro-Electric Project, AFDB: African Development Bank
- Buzuguri, Goreth (25 January 2017), "Regideso/alerte: Les niveaux des eaux des barrages électriques baissent dangereusement", Radio Télévision Nationale du Burundi (in French)
- "Électricité : dans le noir, on s'interroge…", Iwacu (in French), 2 September 2011
- Kuriyo, Benjamin (19 June 2020), "Panorama du secteur énergétique", BurundiEco (in French)
- Kuriyo, Benjamin (11 May 2018), "Le Burundi va tripler son offre d'électricité d'ici 5 ans", BurundiEco (in French)
- Ndayiragije, Gaspard (May 1991), "L'aménagement hydro-électrique dans la région des Grands Lacs.", L’eau et l’aménagement dans l’Afrique des grands lacs. Colloque de Bujumbura (in French)
- Poindexter, Gregory (15 August 2016), "Strategies used at 18-MW Rwegura hydroelectric facility in Burundi to deal with low water levels", HydroReview
