= REGIDESO Burundi =

State-owned water and power company in Burundi

Coordinates: 3.386919°S 29.3615087°E

- REGIDESO
- Type: State owned
- Industry: Water and power
- Founded: June 22, 1962; 64 years ago
- Headquarters: Avenue de la Révolution No.010-010-014 Rohero, Bujumbura, Burundi
- Key people: Dr. Eng. Ltn Col. Jean Albert Manigomba, CEO
- Headquarters in Bujumbura
- Website: regideso.bi

REGIDESO Burundi (French: Régie de Production et de Distribution d’eau et d’électricité du Burundi, Burundi Water and Electricity Production and Distribution Authority) is a state-owned water and power distribution company in Burundi.

== Mandate ==
REGIDESO has the mission of capture, treatment and distribution of water; of production and distribution of electricity; and of marketing these products in urban centers and other locations specified by the board of directors. REGIDESO undertakes, or subcontracts, studies and works needed to achieve this mission. REGIDESO is supervised by the Ministry responsible for Energy and Mines, which reviews and approves decisions taken by the board of directors.

== Power generation and supply ==
As of 2008 REGIDESO supplied most of the country's electricity from seven hydroelectric power plants, with a total installed capacity of 30.6 MW. Rwegura (18MW) and Mugere (8 MW) between them provided 85% of the domestic power supply. REGIDESO operated and controlled all the thermal power stations in Burundi, and also ran various small hydroelectric units in rural areas. It was responsible for supplying water and distributing power in urban areas, mostly in and around Bujumbura.

The Direction Generale de l'Hydraulique et de l'Électrifacation Rurales (DGHYER) buys electricity from REGIDESO and distributes it to rural customers. It used to operate its own power plants, but now only has a few, unreliable micro plants.

REGIDESO has a leased 10 MW diesel generator. It imports 3 MW from the National Electricity Company of the Democratic Republic of Congo (SNEL) from the joint hydroelectric power station of Ruzizi I, and imports 13.3 MW from the International Electricity Company of the Great Lakes Countries (SINELAC). Burundi is integrated into the Eastern Africa Power Pool (EAPP), which aims to establish connections through which power can be traded between member countries. There may be potential for Burundi to export low-cost hydroelectric power. As of 2024 it had a staff of 1272.

== History ==
=== Colonial era (1939–1962) ===
The Régie de Production et de Distribution d’Eau et d’Electricité (REGIDESO) du Congo-Belge et du Ruanda-Urundi (Water and Electricity Production and Distribution Authority (REGIDESO) of the Belgian Congo and Ruanda-Urundi) was created by decree on 30 December 1939.

Before Burundi became independent, the International Agency for Rural Development (AIDR) supplied water to centers in the interior of the country, and the REGIDESO of the Belgian Congo and Ruanda-Urundi produced and distributed water and electricity in urban areas.

=== Early years (1962–1975) ===
The Régie de Distribution d’Eau et d’Electricité du Burundi (Burundi Water and Electricity Distribution Authority: REGIDESO Burundi) was created on 22 June 1962 by the High Representative of Belgium in Burundi. It was an administration with a distinct legal personality and administrative and financial autonomy.

When it was created, REGIDESO did not have any hydroelectric capacity. Power was supplied through a small number of generators in the interior, and through the Bujumbura and Gitega thermal power stations. Electrical energy was also provided by the Ruzizi I Hydroelectric Power Station on the Ruzizi River via the SNEL Substation. The city of Bujumbura received water from the Ntahangwa, Gatunguru and Kinuke sources.

Between 1962 and 1975 REGIDESO was mainly involved in organizing itself, looking for partners and identifying projects. On 2 October 1968 REGIDESO was placed under the authority of the Ministry of Public Works, Energy and Mines.

=== Expansion (1975–1992) ===
From 1975 to 1992 REGIDESO expanded to supply drinking water and electricity to all the urban centers with the help of Germany, France, China and the World Bank. Hydroelectric power plants were built at Gikonge, Kayenzi, Buhiga, Sanzu, Marangara, Rwegura and Nyemanga (in 1988), as well as the Rusizi community hydroelectric power plant. Electricity transmission and distribution lines were built during this period. On 11 March 1986 a presidential decree made REGIDESO a public legal establishment of a commercial and industrial nature with legal personality and financial and organic autonomy.

=== Civil war (1992–2004) ===
Between 1992 and 2004 administration, accounting and commercial servies were split between Electricity and Water Directorates. This was a period of civil unrest in which much of the REGIDESO infrastructure was destroyed. In 1995 REGIDESO acquired a 5.5 MW thermal power station in Bujumbura, but up to 2008 it was generally idle, available as an emergency back-up. Low prices for electricity and high costs for diesel made it uneconomical.

On 5 September 1997 decree No. 100/164 made REGIDESO-S.P. an "Authority" within the Code of Private and Public Companies. The headquarters were established in the Urban Commune of Rohero, in Bujumbura. REGIDESO was a company with public participation supervised by the Ministry of Energy and Mines. The company struggled to rebuild and maintain infrastructure due to withdrawal of donors and lack of sales revenue. On 20 August 2000 REGIDESO lost its monopoly on electricy production.

=== Port-war reconstruction (2004–present) ===
Under the terms of the World Bank's Economic Reform Support Grant, REDIDESO was one of 14 public enterprises targeted in the 2006-2008 privatization program. The others were OCIBU, BRB, Abattoir Public de Bujumbura (APB), OPHAVET, ONATEL, SOSUMO, COTEBU, UCAR, OTB, SOCABU and SIP.

Between 2005 and 2016 REGIDESO rebuilt and developed infrastructure, and extended the supply of water and electricity to new locations. It also increased consumer prices to make it more attractive to future investors. In June 2016 several districts of Bujumbura Mairie experienced severe water shortages, with some receiving no water for days. Regideso explained that many distribution pipes were broken or clogged, and promised to solve the problem within a week. As of 2020 Redideso was in poor financial condition. It had large unpaid debts, and was having difficulty paying its creditors, including the thermal power plants operator Interpetrol.

A report in January 2024 quoted the general director of Regideso, Jean-Albert Manigomba, in saying that despite repeated power cuts in Bujumbura Mairie, the electricity supply was improving fast. The Rusumo Hydroelectric Power Station had been completed, and the Kabu 16 Hydroelectric Power Station was under construction. Both should be delivering energy that year. The Jiji-Murembwe Hydroelectric Power Station should also be completed in 2024.

The Kabu 16 Hydroelectric Power Station was inaugurated on October 25, 2024 while the Jiji-Murembwe Hydroelectric Power Station was inaugurated on 24 June 2025.

The power cuts were due to a network of underground wires in Bujumbura that dated to the 1960s. Work was underway, with funding from the World Bank and other partners, to rehabilitate this network and improve the network in the rest of the country. In the longer term, a line via Rwanda, Uganda and Kenya, would lead to the Grand Ethiopian Renaissance Dam, which should supply 200 MW. Also, a line from the Ruzizi III Hydroelectric Power Station could provide 26 MW to Burundi in 2028. Another project would obtain 200 MW from a dam being built in Tanzania.

== See also ==
- List of power stations in Burundi
- List of companies of Burundi

== Sources ==
- "Burundi-Regideso : Le problème de manque d'eau sera résolu dans une semaine", IndundiCulture Radio (in French), 29 June 2016
- Historique de la REGIDESO (in French), REGIDESO
- IBP (3 March 2008), Burundi Energy Policy, Laws and Regulations Handbook Volume 1 Strategic Information and Regulations, Lulu.com, ISBN 978-1-4330-7118-8
- Kwizera, Emery (16 January 2024), "Coupures répétitives d'électricité : La Regideso donne toujours des raisons d'espérer", Iwacu (in French)
- Proposed grant in the amount of SDR 12 million to the Republic of Burundi for a financial and private sector development project (PDF), World Bank, 25 November 2009
- Régie de Production et de Distribution d'eau et d'électricité (in French), Esoko
- Rugira, Aimé (18 February 2021), "Regideso vs Gouvernement : qui dit vrai ?", yaga-burundi (in French)
