= List of Catholic dioceses in Burundi =

The Roman Catholic Church in Burundi is composed of 2 ecclesiastical provinces and 5 suffragan dioceses.

== List of dioceses ==
=== Conference of Catholic Bishops of Burundi ===
==== Ecclesiastical Province of Bujumbura ====
- Archdiocese of Bujumbura
  - Diocese of Bubanza
  - Diocese of Bururi

==== Ecclesiastical Province of Gitega ====
- Archdiocese of Gitega
  - Diocese of Muyinga
  - Diocese of Ngozi
  - Diocese of Rutana
  - Diocese of Ruyigi
