= Léonidas Nitereka =

Burundian Catholic prelate (born 1960)

The Most Reverend Léonidas Nitereka
- Bishop of Rutana, Burundi
- Church: Catholic Church
- Archdiocese: Roman Catholic Archdiocese of Gitega
- See: Diocese of Rutana
- Appointed: 15 February 2025
- Installed: 12 April 2025
- Predecessor: Bonaventure Nahimana
- Successor: Incumbent

Orders
- Ordination: 17 August 1986
- Consecration: 12 April 2025 by Dieudonné Datonou
- Rank: Bishop

Personal details
- Born: Léonidas Nitereka; 1 September 1960 (age 65) Martyazo, Diocese of Bururi, Makamba Province, Burundi
- Motto: "Ut fructum multum afferatis" (That you may bear much fruit)

Styles of Léonidas Nitereka
- Reference style: Your Lordship; The Most Reverend
- Spoken style: His Lordship
- Religious style: Bishop

Léonidas Nitereka (born 1 September 1960) is a Burundian Catholic prelate who is the bishop of the Roman Catholic Diocese of Rutana, in Burundi, since 15 February 2025. Before that, he served as a priest of the Diocese of Bururi, in Burundi from 17 August 1986 until 15 February 2025. He was appointed bishop by Pope Francis. His episcopal consecration took place on 12 April 2025 at Rutana by the hands of Dieudonné Datonou, Titular Archbishop of Vico Equense.

== Background and education ==
Léonidas Nitereka was born on 1 September 1960 at Martyazo, Diocese of Bururi, Makamba Province, Burundi. He studied philosophy at the Saint Curé d'Ars Major Seminary in Bujumbura. He then studied theology at the Saint John Paul II Major Seminary in Gitega. He graduated with a Doctorate in Anthropological Theology from the Pontifical Gregorian University, in Rome, Italy in 2006.

== Priest ==
On 17 August 1986, he was ordained a priest for the Diocese of Bururi in Burundi. He served in that capacity until 15 February 2025. While a priest, he served in various capacities and locations including as:

- Chaplain of secondary schools in the Diocese of Bururi from 1986 until 1987.
- Parish priest of Murago Parish, Diocese of Bururi from 1987 until 1990.
- Treasurer of Bururi Diocese from 1990 until 1997.
- Studies in Rome, leading to the award of a Doctorate in Anthropological Theology at the Pontifical Gregorian University from 1997 until 2006.
- Pastoral Service in the Archdiocese of Florence, Italy from 1997 until 2006.
- Rector of the Buta Minor Seminary from 2007 until 2012.
- President of the Clergy of Bururi Diocese from 2007 until 2012.
- Vicar General of the Diocese of Bururi from 2010 until 2025.
- Director of the Pastoral Office of Bururi Diocese from 2010 until 2025.

== Bishop ==
On 15 February 2025, Pope Francis appointed Reverend Father Monsignor Léonidas Nitereka, previously a member of the clergy of Bururi Diocese, as the new bishop of the Diocese of Rutana, Burundi. He was consecrated and installed at Rutana, Burundi on 12 April 2025. The Chief Consecrator was Dieudonné Datonou, Titular Archbishop of Vico Equense assisted by Bonaventure Nahimana, Archbishop of Gitega and Salvator Niciteretse, Bishop of Bururi. He succeeded Bonaventure Nahimana who was appointed Archbishop of the Ecclesiastical Metropolitan Province of Gitega in February 2022.

== See also ==
- Catholic Church in Burundi

== Succession table ==
Catholic Church titles
Preceded by Bonaventure Nahimana (17 January 2009 - 19 February 2022)	Bishop of Rutana (since 15 February 2025)	Succeeded by Incumbent
