= Emmanuel Ntakarutimana =

Burundian Catholic prelate (born 1956)

The Most Reverend Emmanuel Ntakarutimana
- Bishop of Bubanza, Burundi
- Church: Catholic Church
- Archdiocese: Roman Catholic Archdiocese of Bujumbura
- See: Diocese of Bubanza
- Appointed: 15 February 2025
- Installed: 5 April 2025
- Predecessor: Jean Ntwagarara (24 October 1997 - 1 April 2023)
- Successor: Incumbent

Orders
- Ordination: 23 August 1987
- Consecration: 5 April 2025 by Archbishop Dieudonné Datonou
- Rank: Bishop

Personal details
- Born: Emmanuel Ntakarutimana; 30 December 1956 (age 69) Gitega, Archdiocese of Gitega, Burundi

Styles of Emmanuel Ntakarutimana
- Reference style: Your Lordship; The Most Reverend
- Spoken style: His Lordship
- Religious style: Bishop

Emmanuel Ntakarutimana O.P. (born 30 December 1956) is a Burundian Catholic prelate who was appointed Bishop of the Roman Catholic Diocese of Bubanza, in Burundi on 15 February 2025. Before that, from 23 August 1987 until 15 February 2025, he was a priest. He was appointed bishop of Bubanza by Pope Francis. He was consecrated and installed at Bubanza, Diocese of Bubanza on 5 April 2025 by Dieudonné Datonou, Titular Archbishop of Vico Equense, the Papal Nuncio to Burundi. Bishop Ntakarutimana is a professed member of the Catholic religious Order of Preachers (Dominican Order).

== Background and education ==
He was born on 30 December 1956 in Gitega, in the Archdiocese of Gitega. He studied philosophy at the Major Seminary of Bujumbura. He then studied theology at the Catholic University of the Congo in Kinshasa, Democratic Republic of the Congo. He holds a Doctorate degree in Fundamental Theology, awarded by the University of Fribourg in Switzerland.

== Priesthood ==
He made his preliminary vows as a member of the Dominican Order on 28 September 1981 in Ibadan, Nigeria. Then in 1984, he made his perpetual vows in Rweza, Burundi. He was ordained a priest for his religious Order in Gitega, Burundi on 23 August 1987. He served as a priest until 15 February 2025. While a priest, he served in various roles and locations, including as:

- Professor of Fundamental Theology at the Major Seminary of Gitega from 1986 until 1989.
- Secretary of the Episcopal Commission for Justice and Peace from 1988 until 1990.
- Master of Students at the Inter-African Formation House of the Dominicans in Kinshasa from 1991 until 1993.
- Advisor to the Superior and Coordinator for Africa of the Order of Dominican Fathers from 1993 until 1999.
- Coordinator of the Ubuntu Center for the Promotion of Peace and Reconciliation in Bujumbura from 2001 until 2015.
- Director of the Office of the Episcopal Conference for Evangelization from 2015 until 2021.
- Coordinator of the Council for the creation of the Catholic University of Burundi from 2021 until 2025.

== As bishop ==
On 15 February 2025, Pope Francis appointed him as bishop of the Roman Catholic Diocese of Bubanza, Burundi, a suffragan of the Ecclesiastical Metropolitan Province of Bujumbura. He succeeded Bishop Jean Ntagwarara who had retired in April 2023, having attained the mandatory retirement age for Catholic Bishops.

Bishop Ntakarutimana was consecrated bishop and installed at Bubanza, Burundi on 5 April 2025, by the hands of Dieudonné Datonou, Titular Archbishop of Vico Equense assisted by Georges Bizimana, Bishop of Ngozi and Bonaventure Nahimana, Archbishop of Gitega.

== See also ==
- Catholic Church in Burundi

== Succession table ==
Catholic Church titles
Preceded by Jean Ntagwarara (24 October 1997 - 1 April 2023)	Bishop of Bubanza (since 15 February 2025)	Succeeded by Incumbent
