= Salvator Niciteretse =

Burundian Catholic prelate (born 1958)

The Most Reverend Salvator Niciteretse
- Bishop of Bururi, Burundi
- Church: Catholic Church
- Archdiocese: Roman Catholic Archdiocese of Bujumbura
- See: Diocese of Bururi
- Appointed: 15 February 2020
- Installed: 20 April 2020
- Predecessor: Venant Bacinoni (25 June 2007 - 15 February 2020)
- Successor: Incumbent

Orders
- Ordination: 18 February 2006
- Consecration: 1 March 2025 by Gervais Banshimiyubusa
- Rank: Bishop

Personal details
- Born: Salvator Niciteretse; 2 August 1958 (age 68) Rutwenzi, Diocese of Bururi, Rumonge Province, Burundi

Styles of Salvator Niciteretse
- Reference style: Your Lordship; The Most Reverend
- Spoken style: His Lordship
- Religious style: Bishop

Salvator Niciteretse (born 2 August 1958) is a Burundian Catholic prelate who was appointed Bishop of the Roman Catholic Diocese of Bururi, in Burundi on 15 February 2020. Before that, from 9 July 1989 until 15 February 2020, he was a priest of the same Catholic diocese. He was appointed bishop by Pope Francis. He was consecrated and installed at Bururi, Diocese of Bururi on 18 April 2020 by Gervais Banshimiyubusa, Archbishop of Bujumbura.

== Background and education ==
He was born on 2 August 1958 in Rutwenzi, Diocese of Bururi, Rumonge Province, Burundi. He studied at the Kanyosha Minor Seminary from 1975 until 1979. He then transferred to the Middle Seminary of Bujumbura, where he graduated with "a humanistic diploma" in 1982. He studied philosophy at the Major Seminary of Bujumbura from 1982. He graduated from there in 1985 with a bachelor's degree in the subject. From 1985, he studied at the Major Seminary of Burasira, where he graduated with bachelor's degree in theology in 1989. From 1998 until 2002, he studied at the Pontifical Lateran University, in Rome, Italy, where he earned a licentiate in pastoral theology and a doctorate in the "social doctrine of the Church".

== Priesthood ==
He was ordained a priest for the Diocese of Bururi on 9 July 1989. He served as a priest until 15 February 2020. While a priest, he served in various roles and locations, including as:

- Parish vicar and parish priest of Murago Parish from 1989 until 1993.
- National chaplain of the "Xaveri Movement" from 1989 until 1993.
- Parish priest of the Cathedral of Bururi and diocesan director of the Pontifical Mission Societies from 1993 until 1998.
- Studies at the Pontifical Lateran University, in Rome, leading to the award of a licentiate in pastoral theology and a doctorate in the social doctrine of the Church from 1998 until 2002.
- Secretary of the Episcopal Commission for the Lay Apostolate.
- Professor at the Major Seminary of Gitega.
- Professor at the Major Seminary of Kiryama.
- African representative at the International Forum of Catholic Action.

== As bishop ==
On 15 February 2020, Pope Francis appointed him as bishop of the Roman Catholic Diocese of Bururi, Burundi, a suffragan of the Ecclesiastical Metropolitan Provinceof Bujumbura. He succeeded Bishop Venant Bacinoni, who retired.

Bishop Salvator Niciteretse was consecrated bishop and installed at Bururi, Burundi on 18 April 2020. The Principal Consecrator was Gervais Banshimiyubusa, Archbishop of Bujumbura assisted by Joachim Ntahondereye, Bishop of Muyinga and Evariste Ngoyagoye, Archbishop Emeritus of Bujumbura. He continues to provide pastoral care to the diocese of Bururi, as the local ordinary as of January 2026.

== See also ==
- Catholic Church in Burundi

== Succession table ==
Catholic Church titles
Preceded by Venant Bacinoni (25 June 2007 - 15 February 2020)	Bishop of Bururi (since 15 February 2020)	Succeeded by Incumbent
