= Georges Bizimana =

Burundian Catholic prelate (born 1961)

The Most Reverend Georges Bizimana
- Bishop of Bishop of Ngozi, Burundi
- Church: Roman Catholic Church
- Archdiocese: Roman Catholic Archdiocese of Gitega
- Diocese: Roman Catholic Diocese of Ngozi
- Appointed: 7 December 2013
- Installed: 1 March 2014
- Predecessor: Gervais Banshimiyubusa
- Successor: Incumbent

Orders
- Ordination: 20 August 1994
- Consecration: 1 March 2014 by Gervais Banshimiyubusa

Personal details
- Born: Georges Bizimana; 12 March 1965 (age 61) Buraniro, Ngozi Province, Burundi
- Denomination: Roman Catholic

Georges Bizimana (born 12 March 1965) is a Burundian Roman Catholic prelate. He is the Bishop of the Roman Catholic Diocese of Ngozi, Burundi since 2019. He was appointed bishop on 7 December 2013 by Pope Francis. He served as Coadjutor Bishop of the diocese of Bubanza in Burundi from 7 December 2013 until 17 December 2019. He was appointed as the Ordinary at Ngozi on 17 December 2019. He was installed there on 25 January 2020. He contemporaneously served as Apostolic Administrator of the Diocese of Bubanza, Burundi from 1 April 2023 until 5 April 2025.

== Early years and education ==
He was born on 12 March 1965 in Buraniro, Ngozi Province, Diocese of Ngozi, in northern Burundi. He studied philosophy and theology before he was ordained a priest in 1994. He lholds a Doctorate in Moral Theology from the Alphonsian Academy in Rome.

== Priest ==
On 20 August 1994 he was ordained a priest of the Diocese of Ngozi in Burundi. He served in that capacity until 7 December 2013.

As a priest, he held various positions inside and outside his diocese including as:

- Lecturer at the Jean Paul II Major Theological Seminary at Gitega, Burundi.
- Rector of the Jean Paul II Major Theological Seminary at Gitega.

== Bishop ==
On 7 December 2013 Pope Francis appointed him Coadjutor Bishop of Bubanza, Burundi. He was consecrated and installed at Bubanza Stadium, in Bubanza, Burundi on 1 March 2014. The Principal Consecrator was Bishop Gervais Banshimiyubusa, Bishop of Ngozi assisted by Archbishop Evariste Ngoyagoye, Archbishop of Bujumbura and Archbishop Simon Ntamwana, Archbishop of Gitega.

On 17 December 2019 The Holy Father appointed him as the Bishop of the Roman Catholic Diocese of Ngonzi, Burundi. He was installed there on 25 January 2020. On 1 April 2023 Pope Francis accepted the age-related retirement request submitted by Bishop Jean Ntagwarara from the pastoral care of the Catholic Diocese of Rubanza in Burundi. On the same day The Pope appointed Bishop Georges Bizimana of Ngozi as Apostolic Administrator of Bubanza, Burundi until such a time when a suitable bishop is found. His administratorship at Bubanza ceased on 5 April 2025.

== See also ==
- Catholic Church in Burundi

== Succession table ==
Catholic Church titles
Preceded by	Coadjutor Bishop of Bubanza (7 December 2013 - 17 December 2019)	Succeeded by
Preceded by Gervais Banshimiyubusa (14 December 2002 - 24 March 2018)	Bishop of Ngozi (since 17 December 2019)	Succeeded by Incumbent
