= Conference of Catholic Bishops of Burundi =

Assembly of Catholic bishops

The Conference of Catholic Bishops of Burundi (French: Conférence des évêques catholiques du Burundi, CECAB). is the episcopal conference of the Catholic Church in Burundi.

The CECAB is a member of the Association des Conférences Episcopal de l'Afrique Centrale (ACEAC) and Symposium of Episcopal Conferences of Africa and Madagascar (SECAM).

List of presidents of the Bishops' Conference

1980–1986: Joachim Ruhuna, Archbishop of Gitega

1986–1989: Evariste Ngoyagoye, bishop of Bubanza

1989–1997: Bernard Bududira, Bishop of Bururi

1997–2004: Simon Ntamwana, Archbishop of Gitega

2004–2007: Jean Ntagwarara, bishop of Bubanza

2007–2011: Evariste Ngoyagoye, Archbishop of Bujumbura

from 2011: Banshimiyubusa Gervais, Bishop of Ngozi

== See also ==
- Episcopal conference
- Catholic Church in Burundi
