= Religion in Burundi =

Religion in Burundi (2025 ARDA estimate)^{a}
1. Christianity (93.4%)
2. Traditional faiths (4.30%)
3. Islam (2.10%)
4. Other / None (0.20%)
^{a} Upward of 10% of the population is Muslim.

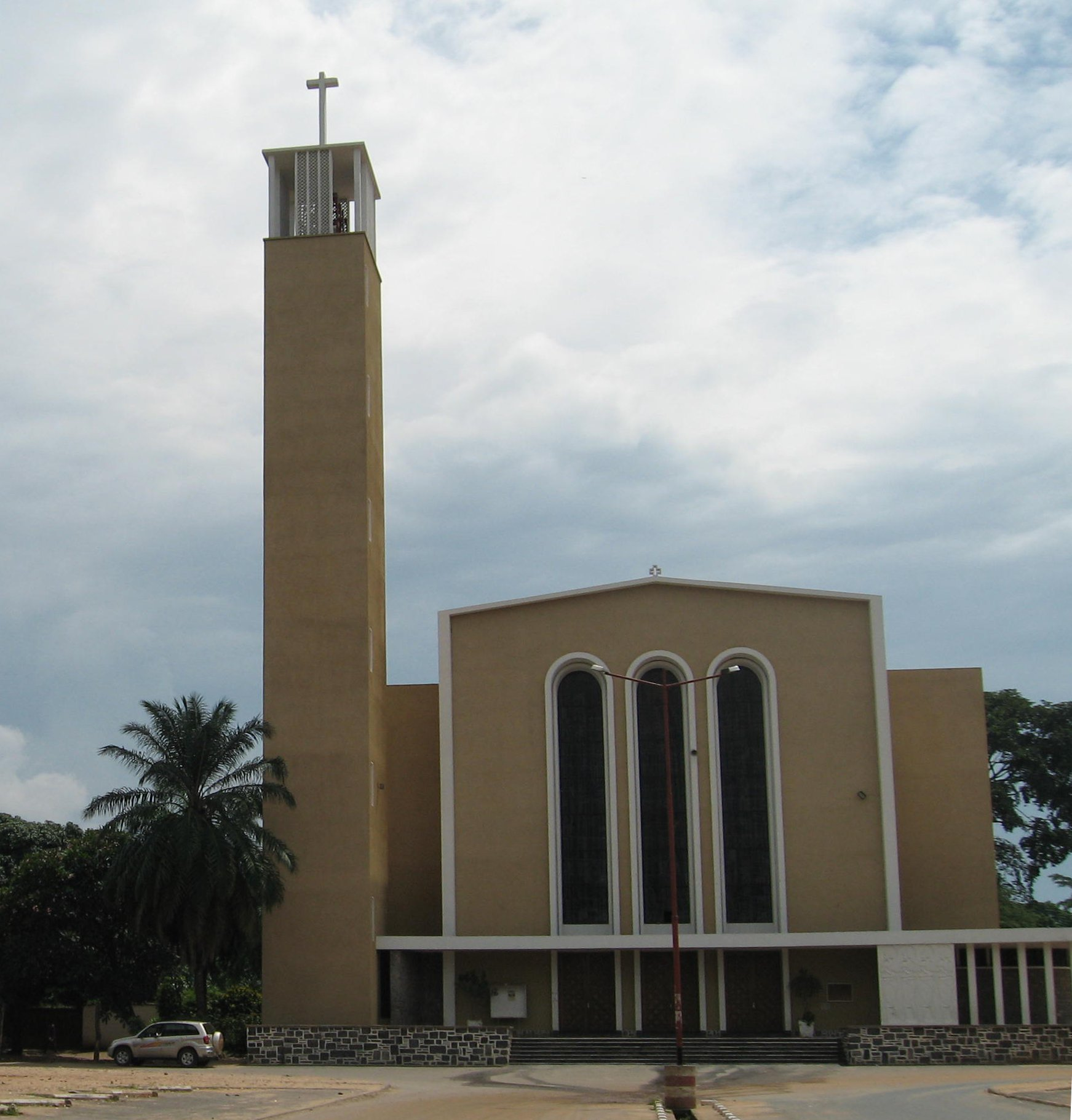
Mary, Queen of the World Cathedral in Bujumbura

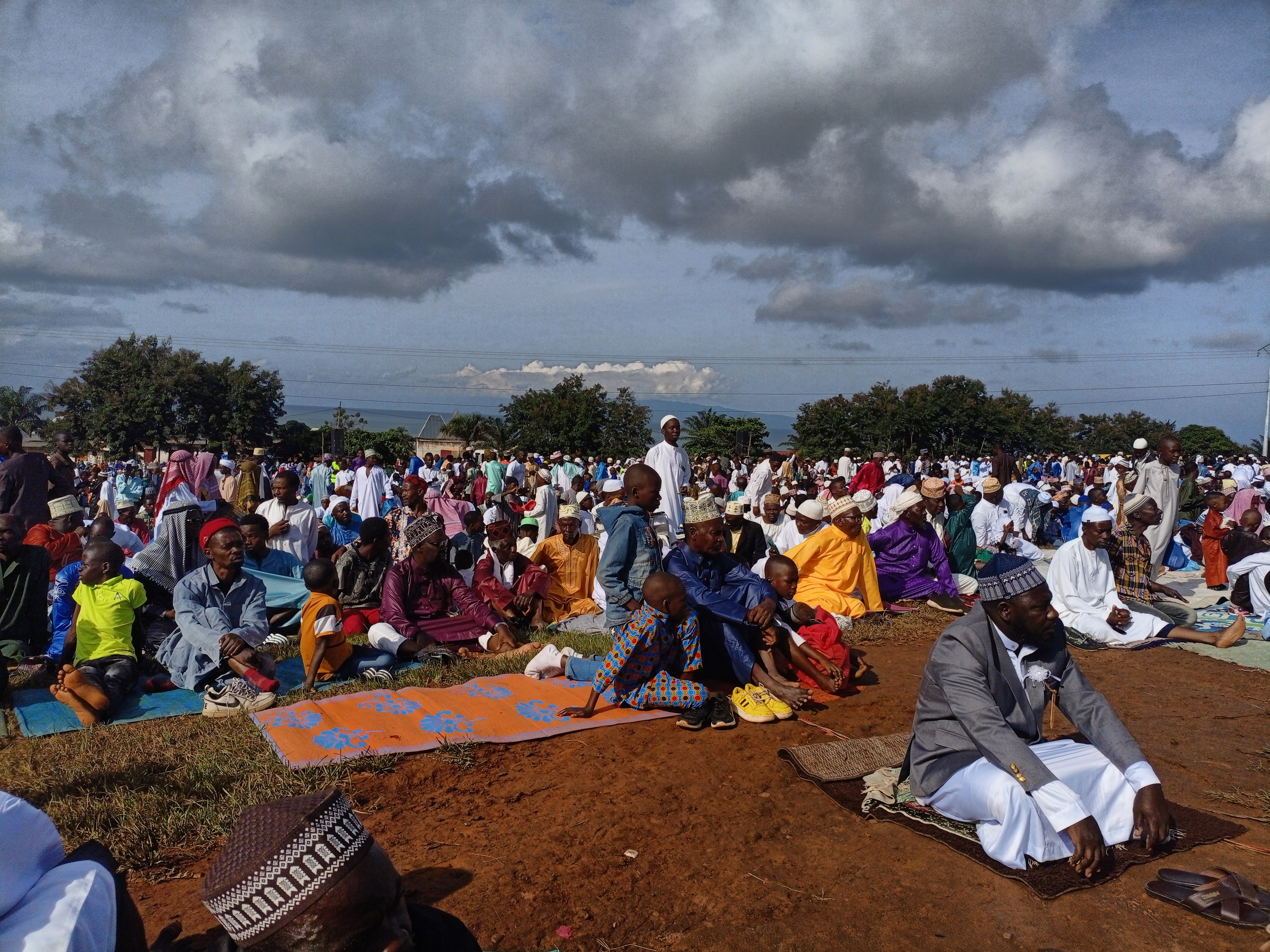
Burundian Muslims celebrating Eid al-Fitr.

Religion in Burundi is diverse, with Christianity being the predominant faith. Catholicism is the largest Christian denomination in the country, followed by Protestantism. Islam is the second largest religion, though its demographic share of the population has been subject to dispute.

Burundi is a secular state and its constitution grants complete freedom of religious practice. Religious festivals including Good Friday, Ascension Day, Assumption Day, All Saints' Day, Christmas, Eid al-Fitr, and Eid al-Adha are recognised as national holidays.

== Statistics ==
According to a 2017 estimate in the CIA Factbook, about 94% of the population of Burundi is Christian (58.6% being Catholic, 35.3% being Protestant), 3.4% is Muslim (mainly Sunni), while 2.3% or 'other' or 'none'.

An estimate by the Encyclopedia of Africa in 2010, states that 67% of the Burundi's people are Christians, 23% follow traditional religions, and 10% are Muslims or adherents of other faiths.

=== Censuses ===
The share of Christians increased from 78.8% to 85.3% of the total population between the 1990 and 2008 population and housing censuses. Similarly, the proportion of Muslims grew from 1.6% to 2.5%, and adherents of other religions also expanded from 0.6% to 6.1% of Burundians in the same period. Conversely, the share of those with an unknown religious affiliation has declined significantly from 18.7% to 6.1% by 2008.

Both Christian and Muslim groups allege that the Muslim population has been undercounted and may constitute upward of 12–15% of the Burundian population.

Religious affiliation by census year
| Religion | 1990 | | 2008 | |
| Religion | # | % | # | % |
|---|---|---|---|---|
| Christianity | 4,174,891 | 78.8 | 6,874,687 | 85.3 |
| —Catholicism | 3,443,087 | 65.0 | 4,941,833 | 61.3 |
| —Protestantism | 729,682 | 13.8 | 1,907,400 | 23.7 |
| —Jehovah's Witnesses | —N/a | —N/a | 25,454 | 0.3 |
| Islam | 83,528 | 1.6 | 200,509 | 2.5 |
| Traditional faiths | 18,251 | 0.3 | 2,747 | 0.0 |
| Other | 30,651 | 0.6 | 494,533 | 6.1 |
| Unknown | 987,594 | 18.7 | 491,098 | 6.1 |
| Total | 5,292,793 | 100 | 8,063,574 | 100 |

== History ==
=== Christianity ===
Religions of Burundi CIA Factbook (2008)
| Religions | percent |
| Catholic | 62.1% |
| Protestant | 23.9% |
| Unspecified | 7.9% |
| Other | 3.6% |
| Islam | 2.5% |

Religions of Burundi Encyclopedia of Africa (2010)
| Religions | percent |
| Christianity | 67% |
| Traditional | 23% |
| Islam | 10% |
| Unspecified | 3.6% |

The earliest Christian missions arrived in 1879, but the missionaries were killed, and the king of Burundi, who ruled through 1908, had no interest in foreign theology or imported goods.

Larger Christian missions arrived in Burundi in the early 20th century, during its German colonial rule era, and followed by its Belgian colonial rule era. Catholic and Protestant missionaries arrived in the first two decades of the 20th century, while the 1920s saw the arrival of Baptists, the 1930s the arrival of Free Methodists and Anglican missionaries. These missions were closely involved with the colonial project. In post-colonial independent Burundi, Christianity has had a deep engagement with political leaders of Burundi, a country with nearly 11 million citizens and one of the most densely populated nations in Africa (over 1000 people per square mile).

The religious institutions within Burundi have both been called upon to help heal social divisions, help end civil chaos after political assassinations, and close wounds of mass violence, but they have also been criticized. Some, such as Timothy Longman - a professor and director of the African Studies Center, state that the colonial officials and Christian missionaries assumed the people of the newly conquered lands to be "savage and anarchic", then worsened the ethnic divisions within the Burundi society by assuming that "the peoples of the world could be neatly divided into distinct racial categories and subcategories" in order to competitively convert them to Christianity. The missionaries did not invent ethnic groups, states Longman, because they pre-existed. However, they did create racial significance when these didn't exist before, inadvertently creating ideological divisions and inequalities.

Initial conversions to Catholicism in Burundi were almost exclusively among the Hutu people – the majority in Burundi but one who neither were the rulers nor were part of economic elite. In contrast, the Protestant missionaries gained early conversions in the elite but minority Tutsi people of Burundi. The assumptions about the ethnic differences, states Longman, led to discriminatory practices, questionable distribution of property. The resulting conflicts and retaliatory genocide among the Hutu and Tutsi ethnic groups, in Burundi and Rwanda, with which Burundi shares history and culture, have attracted widespread dismay and attention.

In the post-colonial contemporary era, Mushasha in the Gitega Province of Burundi serves as its archbishop's seat. The traditional Catholic and Protestant community has been losing members to more emotional Evangelical Protestantism.

=== Islam ===
Islam arrived in Burundi some 200 years before Christianity through Sunni Arab-Swahili traders active in the Lake Tanganyika region. However, Islam has been a minority religion with some presence in the trading towns near the Lake.

== Freedom of Religion ==
In 2022, Freedom House rated Burundi's religious freedom as 3 out of 4, noting that relations between the government and the Catholic Church have worsened in recent years.

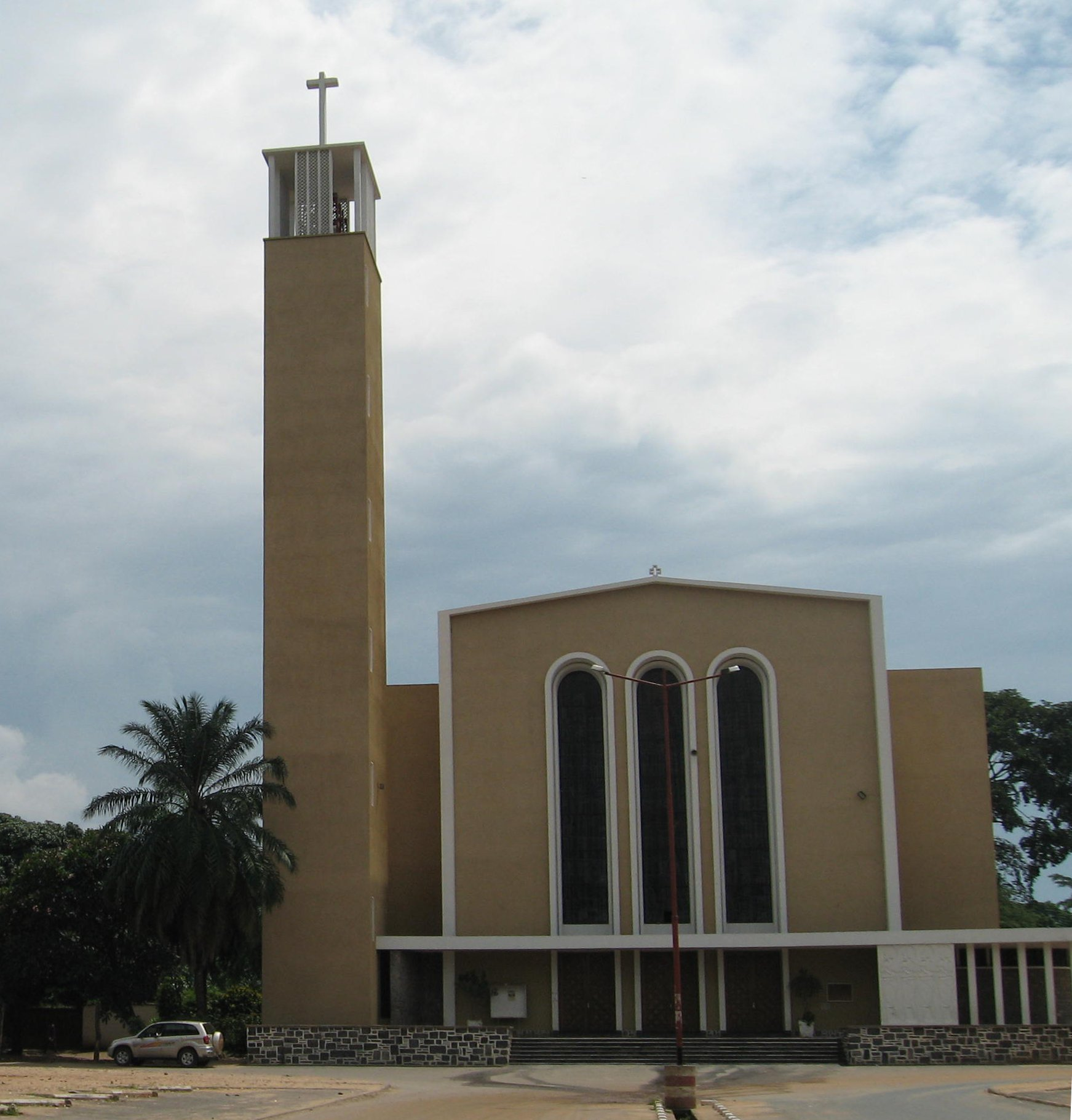
Bujumbura Cathedral

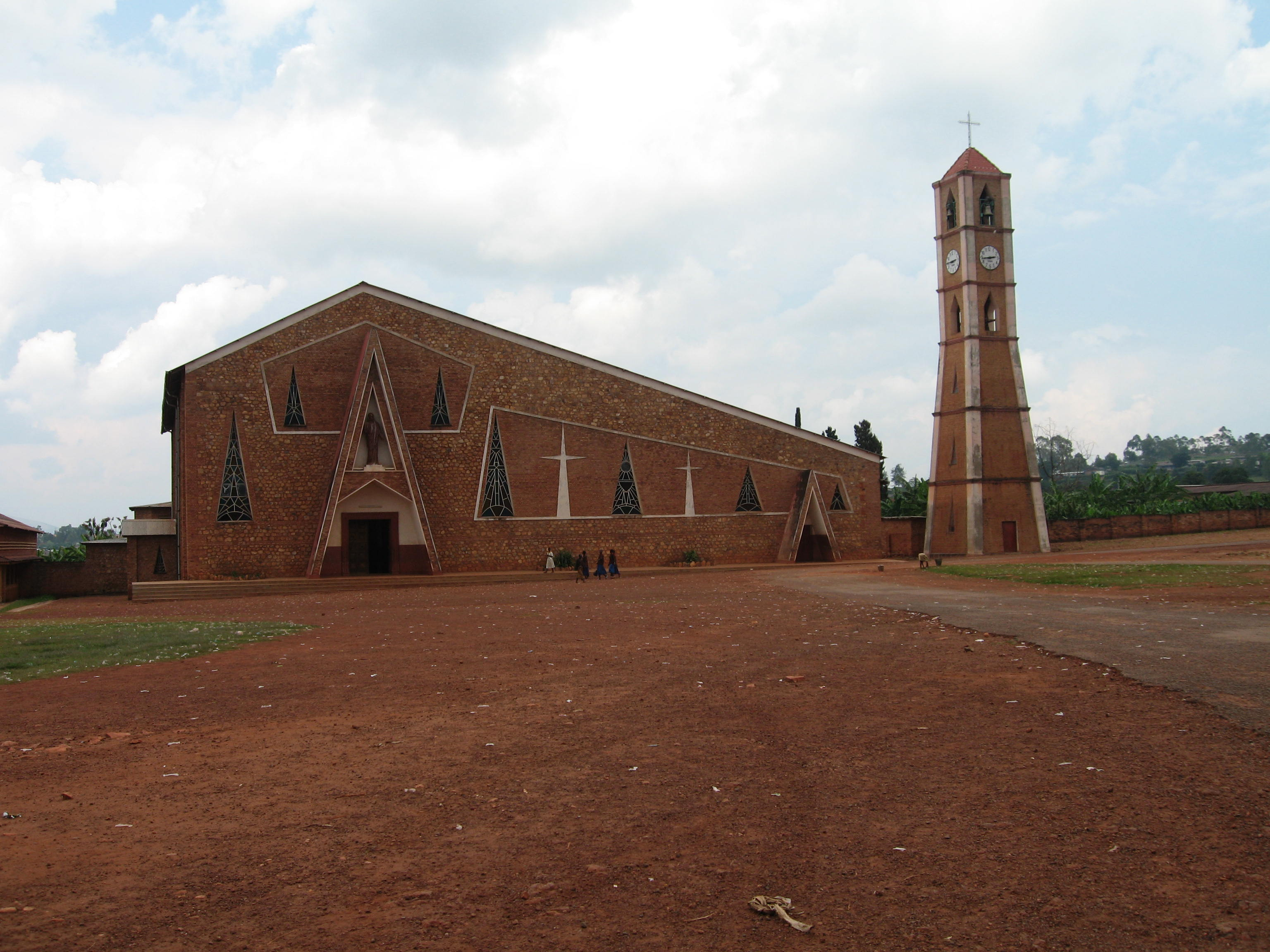
Gitega Church

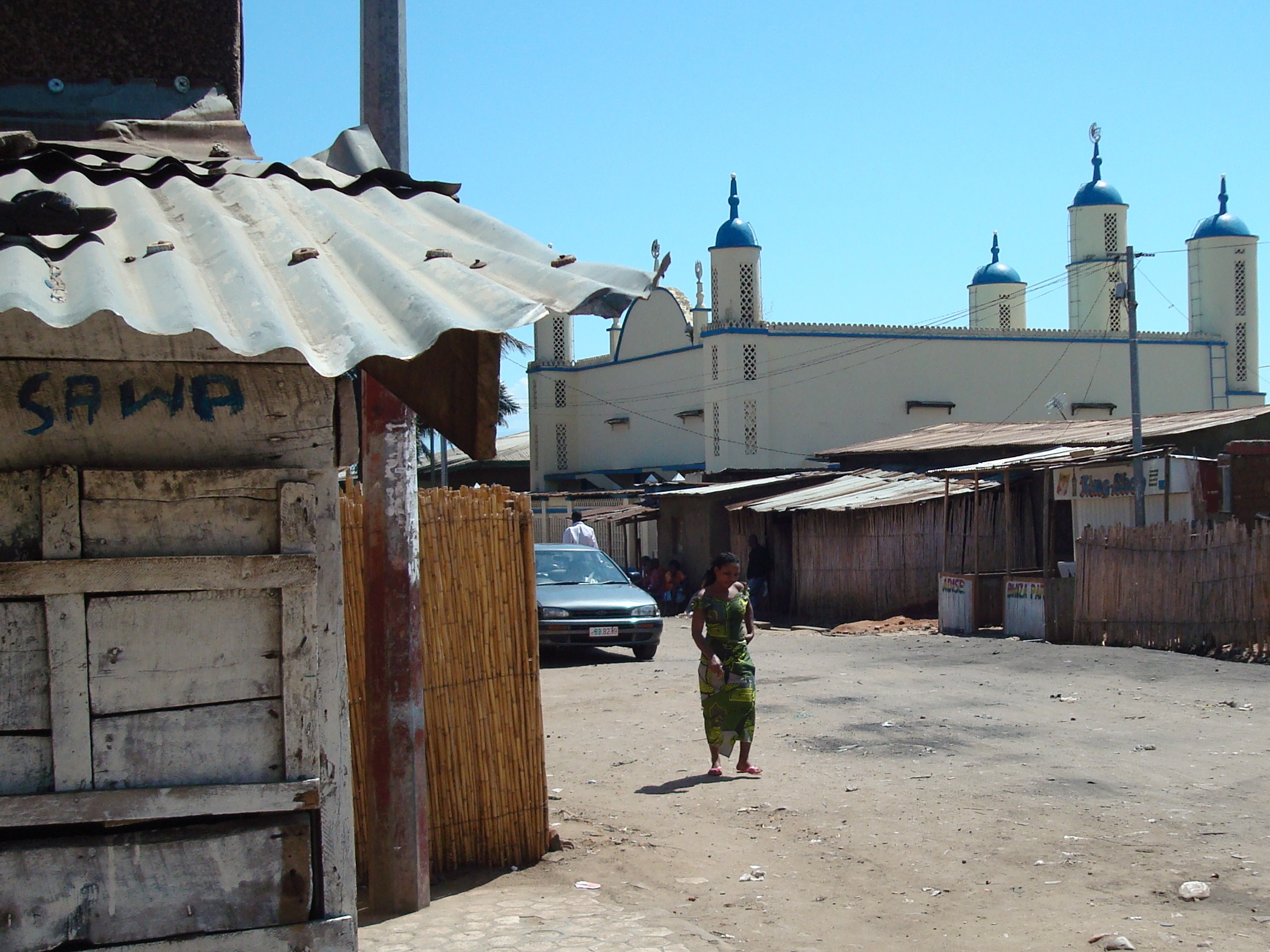
Bujumbura Mosque

== See also ==
- Bahá'í Faith in Burundi
- Christianity in Burundi
- Freedom of religion in Burundi
- Islam in Burundi
