= 1988 ethnic violence in Burundi =

1988 pogroms of Tutsi minority by Hutu ethnic group

Ethnic massacres in Burundi in 1988 were pogroms of Tutsi minority members by Hutu ethnic group members, followed by large-scale retaliatory massacres of Hutu carried out by the Tutsi-dominated army, which took place in August 1988 in the communes of Ntega and Marangara in northern Burundi.

The Hutu were the largest ethnic group in Burundi, but since 1965, power, privileges, and wealth had been reserved exclusively for members of the Tutsi minority. In August 1988, a grassroots Hutu uprising broke out in the communes of Ntega and Marangara in the north of the country, triggered by provocations from local Tutsi officials and fears of a repeat of the 1972 genocide. During several days of riots, several hundred Tutsi were killed, including many women and children. In retaliation, the government army massacred between 15,000 and 30,000 Hutu, forcing another 50,000 to flee the country. The massacres in Ntega and Marangara sparked international outrage, which compelled President Pierre Buyoya to initiate a process of democratization.

== Socio-historical background ==
Burundi, like neighboring Rwanda, gained independence on 1 July 1962. The growing antagonism between the Tutsi minority, which traditionally held a higher social status, and the numerically dominant Hutu had a profound impact on the fate of both countries. (Note: Following Belgian estimates from the 1930s, most sources typically state that Burundi's population consists of 85% Hutu, 14% Tutsi, and 1% Twa. However, Lemarchand (1996, p. 6) points out that these statistics are not particularly reliable, as they do not account for members of the princely ganwa class (who had both Hutu and Tutsi ancestry), the Swahili-speaking minority, or immigrants from neighboring countries. Moreover, data from the 1930s naturally fail to reflect changes in the Hutu population caused by displacement and ethnically motivated massacres since 1965. According to Lemarchand, by the mid-1990s, Tutsi may have constituted as much as 20% of Burundi's population (Skutsch (1999, p. 340)).) In Rwanda, escalating ethnic tensions ultimately led to a bloody popular uprising (1959–1962), which resulted in the overthrow of the Tutsi monarchy and the establishment of a republic entirely dominated by the Hutu. In contrast, Burundi, where the social hierarchy and ethnic divisions were far less rigid and significantly more complex than in its neighbor, began its independent existence as a constitutional monarchy in which the Tutsi retained considerable influence. However, due to a series of factors, relations between the two ethnic groups rapidly deteriorated. A failed coup d'état carried out by a group of Hutu officers in October 1965 enabled the Tutsi-controlled army to secure dominant influence over state affairs. After a few months of uneasy cohabitation, the military overthrew the monarchy and proclaimed the so-called First Republic on 28 November 1966. The head of state became the then-Prime Minister and Minister of Defense, Captain Michel Micombero.

In the following years, the military regime systematically curtailed Hutu influence in politics, the armed forces, and administration. In April 1972, radical Hutu politicians, aided by Congolese mercenaries, launched an armed uprising in the southern provinces of the country, during which between several hundred and several thousand Tutsi were killed. However, the rebellion was swiftly crushed by the government army, and the repression against its sympathizers escalated into a planned and systematic extermination of the Hutu social elite. From late April to September 1972, between 100,000 and 300,000 Hutu were murdered in Burundi, and at least 150,000 were forced to flee the country. This was the first recorded case of genocide in postcolonial Africa. The massacres of 1972 ultimately solidified the Tutsi's status as the dominant group. For the next 16 years, power, influence, privileges, and wealth remained exclusively reserved for Tutsi, while the Hutu were denied access to education and barred from military service or employment in state administration.

On 1 November 1976, President Micombero was overthrown in a military coup. Power was seized by the Supreme Military Council, led by Lieutenant Colonel Jean-Baptiste Bagaza. His rule became known in Burundi's history as the period of the so-called Second Republic. Initially, Bagaza undertook a series of measures that seemingly aimed to ease the ethnic tensions tearing the country apart. However, in reality, his policies were geared toward consolidating absolute Tutsi dominance in political and social life. The system of official Hutu discrimination that existed during the Second Republic (particularly in education) was sometimes compared to South African apartheid. The Bagaza regime also pursued policies restricting the rights of the Roman Catholic Church, which was suspected of supporting Hutu aspirations.

== Birth of the Third Republic ==
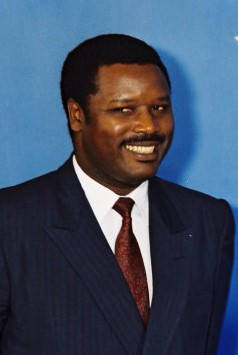
Pierre Buyoya in 1990

By the mid-1980s, Bagaza's rule had become extremely unpopular across all layers of society. In a deeply conservative country, the regime's anti-church policies provoked opposition not only from the Hutu majority but also from many Tutsi. Some members of the ruling elite were deeply concerned that the repression of the church had damaged Burundi's international reputation and strained relations with key foreign aid donors. Widespread corruption and nepotism also fueled dissatisfaction within the military and state bureaucracy. A key catalyst for unrest was Bagaza's decision to force a large group of officers into early retirement – an action that, given the country's economic struggles, amounted to de facto social downgrading for many military personnel. Bagaza's downfall came on 3 September 1987, when a group of officers and non-commissioned officers staged a bloodless coup. While the dictator was attending an Organisation internationale de la Francophonie summit in Quebec, he was stripped of all government and party positions. The National Committee for National Salvation appointed Major Pierre Buyoya as the new president.

At first glance, the coup appeared to be a typical palace intrigue, as Buyoya had been a longstanding member of the ruling elite. Like the deposed president, he belonged to the Tutsi-Hima subgroup and hailed from the southern Bururi Province. The National Committee for National Salvation, which took control, was composed entirely of Tutsi, most of whom were also from Bururi. Nevertheless, Buyoya initiated certain reforms aimed at political liberalization. He prioritized normalizing relations with the church, lifting most restrictions imposed during the Second Republic. Hundreds of Hutu imprisoned for political reasons were released, and three high-ranking Tutsi officials were prosecuted for corruption. His efforts to combat ivory smuggling also earned him international recognition. A significant moment came on 5 December 1987, when the National Committee for National Salvation issued a statement indirectly acknowledging, for the first time in years, the existence of ethnic divisions in Burundi. The document promised that the committee would do everything in its power to "eliminate the various forms of division that threaten harmony and unity among the different ethnic, regional, and clan components of the Burundian nation".

After years of iron-fisted rule, Buyoya's moderate political "thaw" sparked great hopes among the Hutu masses for an improvement in their situation. However, these gestures had little effect on the conduct of local officials and elites. Furthermore, Buyoya had no intention of implementing reforms that would undermine the Tutsi monopoly on the military and state power. The growing disparity between Hutu expectations and reality led to rising political tensions. Between January and March 1988, secondary schools across Burundi were hit by student strikes, with many students – predominantly Hutu – being expelled. On 23 April 1988, dozens of Hutu students fled the university campus in Bujumbura for unknown reasons. Around the same time, reports emerged from the northern provinces of Ngozi and Kirundo about the distribution of anti-government leaflets and secret gatherings involving local Hutu leaders. Many Hutu, fearing imminent reprisals, preemptively fled to neighboring Rwanda. On 10 May 1988, Bishop Bernard Bududira, the ordinary of the Roman Catholic Diocese of Bururi, issued an open letter listing various forms of ethnic discrimination and stating that "whenever a group of Hutu gathers, they are suspected of conspiring". He urged the government to stop treating ethnic tensions as a taboo subject and to initiate an open discussion on the matter. The strong tone of this letter signaled a shift in the previously cautious stance of the Burundian episcopate. Its significance was further heightened by the fact that Bishop Bududira himself was of Tutsi origin.

== Massacres in Ntega and Marangara ==
The political tension that engulfed Burundi in 1988 was particularly felt in Marangara commune in Ngozi Province and the neighboring Ntega commune in Kirundo Province. Both communes were located in the northern part of the country, near the border with Rwanda. In addition to the previously described nationwide factors, several local conditions further contributed to the rise of ethnic antagonisms in the region:

- Following the victorious Hutu revolution in Rwanda, many Tutsi refugees settled in Burundi's northern provinces. Most of them treated the local Hutu population with particular hostility and contempt.
- The residents of Ntega and neighboring communes primarily relied on coffee cultivation for their livelihood. The region was relatively prosperous – in 1985, the GDP per capita in Kirundo Province was 40,000 Burundian francs, more than 50% above the national average. However, while most farmers were Hutu, the majority of intermediaries and coffee traders were Tutsi. This economic disparity strained relations between the two ethnic groups, especially when an economic crisis hit in the mid-1980s due to falling coffee prices on global markets.
- Despite the central government generating significant revenue from local coffee plantations, the social infrastructure in Ntega and Marangara remained underdeveloped and largely inaccessible to ordinary Hutu. For example, in Ntega, which had a population of over 40,000, there was only one qualified healthcare worker. Only 40% of school-aged children attended primary school. Furthermore, in Kirundo Province's schools, the number of Hutu and Tutsi students was roughly equal, despite the fact that Hutu made up the vast majority of the population.
- During the coffee harvest season (April–May), border traffic increased significantly. Hutu opposition members in exile in Rwanda used this opportunity to spread anti-government propaganda in Burundi's northern provinces.
- In April 1988, elections were held in Ntega and Marangara for so-called section committees of the ruling UPRONA party. (Note: In the organizational structure of UPRONA, the "section committees" occupied an intermediate position between the basic party units and the communal committees (Lemarchand (1996, p. 123)).) The Hutu won a majority of seats (as much as 84% in Ntega), but this had little effect on local governance, as commune administrators – usually Tutsi – held almost absolute power. This caused deep resentment among the Hutu, who referred to the election as a "sham vote".
- The frustration and anger of the Hutu were further exacerbated by provocations from local Tutsi officials and elites. Particularly despised were Emmanuel Kajambere from Marangara and Réverien Harushingoro from Ntega. Kajambere, a commune administrator, was known for his arrogance, intransigence, and staunch defense of Tutsi interests. Harushingoro, a wealthy coffee trader, was hated by Hutu farmers and widely known for his active participation in the 1972 genocide.

As tensions grew, on 28 June 1988, Kajambere convened a meeting of local officials and elites (both Tutsi and Hutu) in Marangara. The purpose was to discuss the problem of "illegal and secret tribalist meetings". Kajambere warned the Hutu about the potential consequences of their anti-government activities, subtly implying that the massacres of 1972 could be repeated. A few weeks later, on 5 August, gendarmerie units were deployed from Ngozi to patrol the area. Their presence, combined with Kajambere's earlier threats, triggered panic among Hutu farmers, who began spontaneously erecting road barricades and organizing self-defense groups armed with bows, hoes, and machetes. On the night of 5–6 August, several local bridges were destroyed, followed by five more the next day.

In response, the authorities deployed the 4th Infantry Battalion to Marangara. The Minister of the Interior also personally visited the commune, intending to oversee bridge reconstruction and defuse tensions through dialogue with local Hutu leaders. A meeting was held at a clinic in Murehe, where Hutu leaders demanded the immediate dismissal of Kajambere, a local judge, and the technicien de santé working in Murehe (a Rwandan Tutsi). The minister refused to comply. He continued his provincial inspection while the military and gendarmerie maintained patrols. Many Hutu were arrested for destroying bridges, and among the remaining population, fears grew that the government was preparing to repeat the genocide of 16 years earlier. One local Hutu, who later fled to Rwanda, recalled in an interview with a foreign journalist: "We knew what [the Tutsi] were planning to do. Everyone kept saying: 1972! 1972!". Analogies were also drawn to the fact that President Buyoya came from the same Tutsi clan as President Micombero, who was responsible for the 1972 genocide ("He's Micombero's son! 1972 is happening again!").

The uprising, however, first broke out in neighboring Ntega. On 14 August, local Hutu observed the hated Réverien Harushingoro guiding a group of soldiers through the surrounding hills. That night, a group of Hutu surrounded his house. In panic, Harushingoro opened fire on the crowd, killing six people. He was immediately lynched, along with his family, and his house was set on fire. By the end of 15 August, a full-scale Hutu rebellion had erupted in the hills around Ntega and Marangara. Groups of insurgents – armed with bows, spears, clubs, and machetes – burned Tutsi homes and massacred residents regardless of age or gender. Hundreds of Tutsi tried to save themselves by hiding in the bush or in Catholic missions. However, even missions did not always provide safety. In Ntega, about 300 Tutsi who had sought refuge in a local mission were killed by Hutu attackers. Over the course of several days of riots, at least several hundred Tutsi were murdered.

The government's response was extremely brutal. At least two military battalions, equipped with helicopters and armored vehicles, were deployed to suppress the uprising. In retaliation for the deaths of their fellow Tutsi, soldiers carried out indiscriminate terror, killing thousands of Hutu regardless of age, gender, or any connection to the rebellion. Villages were burned and massacred even where no Tutsi had been harmed by the Hutu. The exact number of victims of the reprisals remains unknown. The most conservative estimates suggest at least 15,000 were murdered. However, the number may have reached 20,000 or even 30,000 Hutu. At least 50,000 Hutu fled to Rwanda, where they were forced to live in refugee camps under primitive conditions. About 45,000 refugees eventually returned to Burundi, but many were arrested upon their return by Burundian security forces.

There is no evidence that the Hutu uprising in Ntega and Marangara was in any way orchestrated by the Hutu armed opposition. It was largely spontaneous, driven by fears of a repeat of the 1972 genocide and provoked by local Tutsi officials. On the other hand, the scale of the retaliatory massacres was likely due to the initiative of the officers and soldiers present on the ground, rather than direct orders from the national leadership.

== Political consequences ==
Initially, the government of Burundi sought to downplay the crisis in Ntega and Marangara, and its response did not differ significantly from previous practices. The causes of the massacre were attributed to "external inspiration", while the number of victims was officially declared to be only 5,000. The government continued to deny the existence of ethnic conflicts in Burundi. When asked by a foreign journalist about the number of Hutu and Tutsi victims, Buyoya responded, "We are all Burundians". Between late August and early September 1988, 48 Hutu suspected of participating in attacks on Tutsi were arrested. None of them were brought to trial; many were tortured, and two died in prison. The remaining 46 prisoners were released only under international pressure in August 1990. Meanwhile, none of the Tutsi involved in massacres against the Hutu were prosecuted.

On 22 August 1988, 27 leading Hutu intellectuals sent an open letter to President Buyoya. They accused the government of perpetuating injustice and social inequality, pointing out that ethnic criteria remained decisive in the distribution of power and wealth. The authors of the letter directly blamed the army for the massacres in Ntega and Marangara and demanded the establishment of an international investigative commission and measures to ensure greater Hutu representation in the government and armed forces. They became targets of fierce government propaganda attacks; six were imprisoned without trial, while nine others fled to Rwanda in fear of arrest.

However, starting in October 1988, the government's policy underwent a radical shift, primarily due to international pressure. While the 1972 genocide of the Hutu had elicited little global reaction, the 1988 tragedy in Ntega and Marangara sparked widespread outrage. The massacres were extensively reported in the press in Belgium, France, West Germany, and the United States, and human rights organizations loudly protested. The foreign ministers of Belgium and Canada demanded an international investigation (on 24 and 31 August 1988, respectively), while the European Parliament passed a strongly worded resolution in September 1988, linking the massacres to the regime's policy of ethnic discrimination. The World Bank also expressed concern and sent a special "information and dialogue mission" to Burundi in October 1988. France, traditionally a protector of Francophone nations, remained largely indifferent.

In September 1988, the United States House of Representatives held public hearings on the events in Burundi. On 7 October 1988, both chambers of the US Congress passed a resolution condemning the violence and urging the Burundian government to take steps toward national reconciliation. The resolution also called on the US president and secretary of state to conduct a comprehensive review of US-Burundi relations and to suspend all economic aid to Burundi (except for humanitarian assistance) and block World Bank loans to the country unless, within six months of the resolution's adoption:

- An impartial investigation involving international experts was conducted;
- The Burundian government took action to punish those responsible for the massacres – military personnel, officials, and private individuals;
- The government took decisive measures to enable refugees to return to their homes;
- The government allowed foreign journalists and humanitarian organizations unrestricted access to areas affected by violence.

Fearing international isolation and economic sanctions, Buyoya initiated sweeping reforms. On 4 October 1988, a 24-member National Commission for the Study of National Unity Issues was established, with an equal number of Hutu and Tutsi representatives. One of its tasks was to investigate the causes and course of the massacres in Ntega and Marangara and to develop recommendations for fostering national unity. Six months later, the commission published its final report. Although it contained numerous half-truths and omissions, it was the first official state document to explicitly acknowledge that the Hutu-Tutsi antagonism remained one of Burundi's most pressing issues.

Meanwhile, Buyoya also implemented significant changes in his government. Adrien Sibomana, a former governor of Muramvya Province and an ethnic Hutu, was appointed prime minister, while the number of Hutu ministers increased from six to twelve. For the first time since 1965, Burundi had a government in which the prime minister and half of the ministers were Hutu. Soon after, a new constitution and the "Charter of National Unity" were adopted. In the following years, the democratization process continued despite numerous challenges, including violent ethnic clashes in the autumn of 1991 and several coup attempts. The culmination of this process was the free presidential elections of June 1993, in which the moderate Hutu opposition candidate, Melchior Ndadaye, emerged victorious.

== Bibliography ==
- Lemarchand, René (1996). Burundi: Ethnic Conflict and Genocide. Woodrow Wilson Center Press and Cambridge University Press. ISBN 0-521-56623-1.
- Skutsch, Carl (1999). "Burundi: ethnic strife since 1962". In Ciment, James (ed.). Encyclopedia of conflicts since World War II. Chicago; London: Fitzroy Dearborn Publishers. ISBN 1-57958-181-1.
