= Christianity in Burundi =

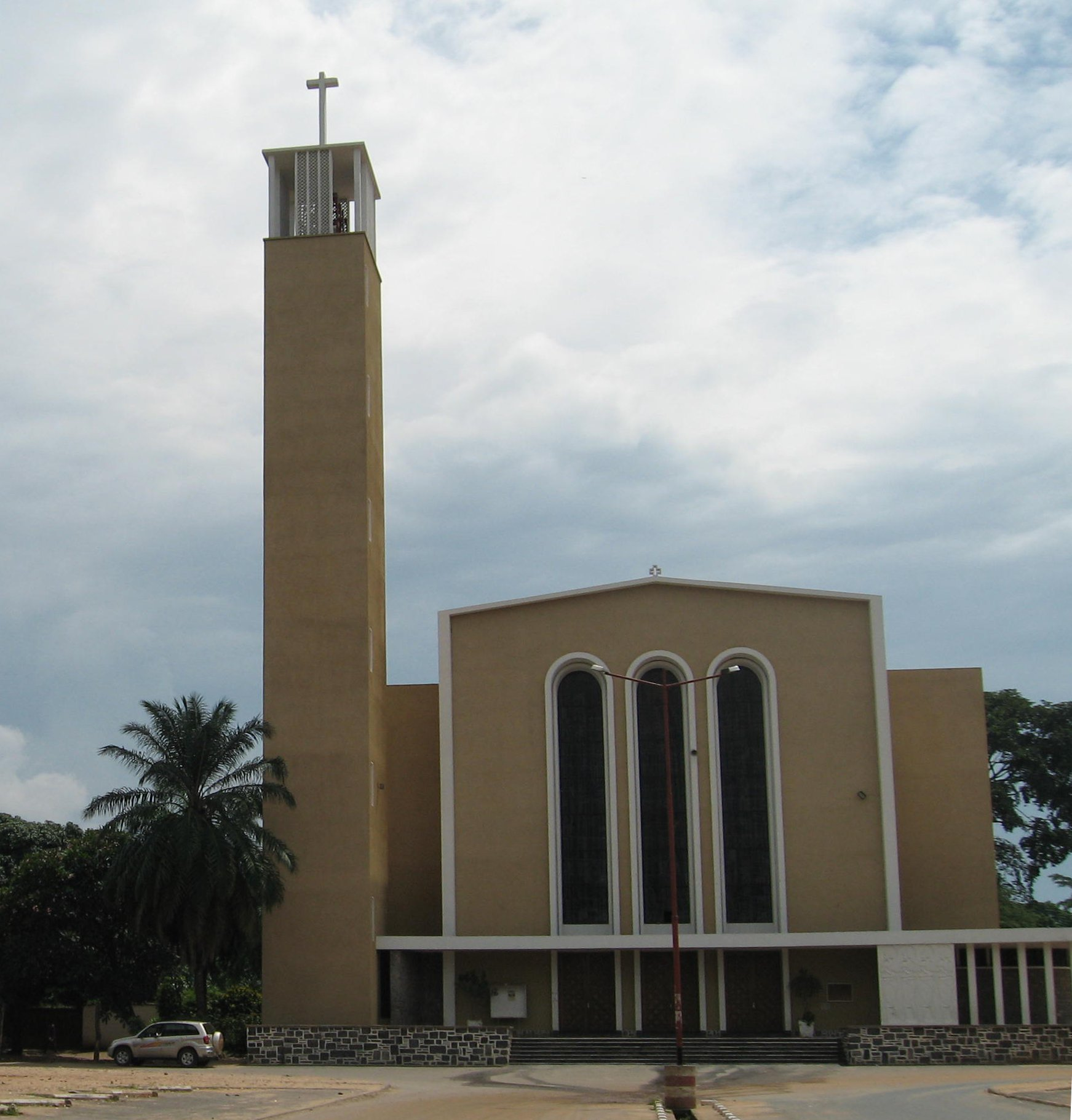
Regina Mundi Cathedral, a Catholic Cathedral in Bujumbura

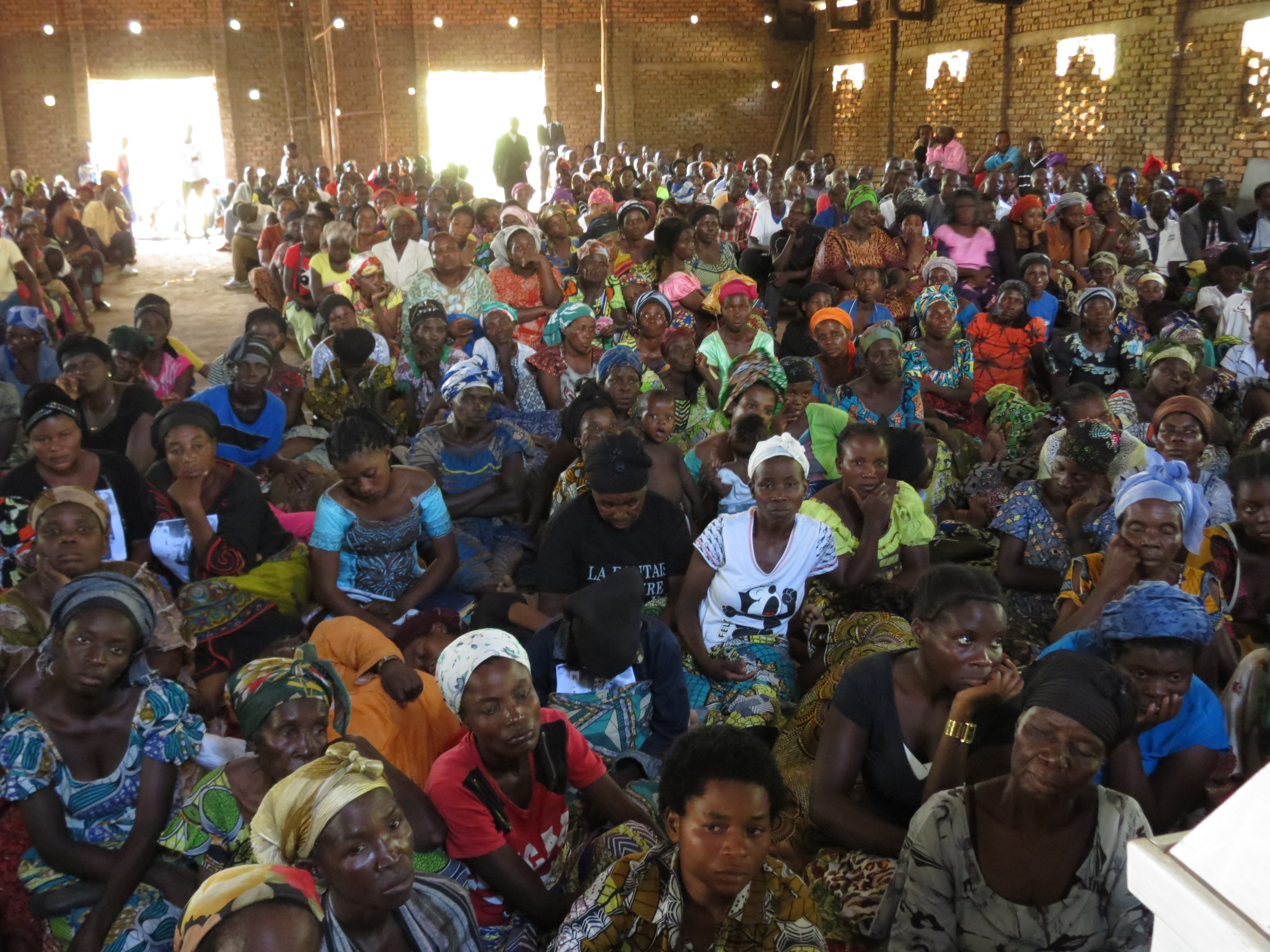
Farewell mass in Bujumbura

Christianity is the majority religion of Burundi. It is estimated to be the religion of between 75–94 percent of the Burundian population. Of these, the majority (60–73 percent) are Catholics and Protestants make up the remainder (15–20 percent). The religion first entered the country under European colonial rule (1890–1962) and remains popular. There are estimated to be 557 separate Churches registered in the country.

== History ==
Christianity is not indigenous to Burundi and arrived during the period of European colonial rule. Protestantism was introduced to the region under German rule (1894–1916) but remained a minority religion. In 1916, there were just 7,000 Christians in the entire country. Catholicism was introduced under Belgian rule (1916–62) and expanded rapidly during the interwar period when it was encouraged as part of the colonial civilising mission. The religion remained popular after independence in 1962. Among the observant Christians was the former president Pierre Nkurunziza, a former rebel leader during the Burundian Civil War, who was a born again Protestant.

== Modern-day ==
Although Burundi is officially a secular state, several religious observances are celebrated as national holidays. This includes Christian festivals such as the Feasts of the Ascension and the Assumption as well as Christmas.

=== Number of adherents ===
Although it is accepted that Christians represent the majority of the population of Burundi, there is no consensus about the exact size of the population that they represent. The United States Department of State estimated in 2010 that 75 percent of Burundians are Christian of which 60 percent are Catholic and 15 percent Protestant. According to the Pew Research Center from 2010, the number of Christians represents 94.1 percent of the national population of whom 73 percent are Catholic and 20 percent Protestant.

Burundian Christians are divided into separate Churches, often very small in size, which differ by religious belief. According to a 2014 estimate, there are 557 different Christian Churches in the country.

== See also ==
- Religion in Burundi
- Islam in Burundi
- Catholic Church in Burundi
- National Council of Churches of Burundi
