= Diocese of Rutana =

Diocese of Rutana may refer to:

- Roman Catholic Diocese of Rutana (f. 2009), Burundi
- Anglican Diocese of Rutana (f. 2017), Burundi
