= Venant Bacinoni =

Roman Catholic prelate (1940–2022)

His Excellency Venant Bacinoni
- Bishop Emeritus of Bururi
- Archdiocese: Bujumbura
- Diocese: Bururi
- Appointed: 25 June 2007
- Term ended: 15 February 2020
- Predecessor: Bernard Bududira
- Successor: Salvator Niciteretse

Personal details
- Born: 20 February 1940 Kirisi, Kingdom of Burundi
- Died: 23 July 2022 (aged 82) Bujumbura, Burundi

Venant Bacinoni (20 February 1940 – 23 July 2022) was a Burundian Roman Catholic prelate. He was bishop of Bururi from 2007 to 2020.

Catholic Church titles
Preceded by Bernard Bududira	Bishop of Bururi; 2007–2020	Succeeded by Salvator Niciteretse
