= Diocese of Ruyigi =

Roman Catholic diocese in Burundi

Diocese of Ruyigi Dioecesis Ruyigiensis

Location
- Country: Burundi
- Metropolitan: Gitega

Statistics
- Area: 4,997 km^{2} (1,929 sq mi)
- Population: Total; Catholics: (as of 2004); 599,689; 370,611 (61.8%)

Information
- Rite: Latin Rite

Current leadership
- Pope: Leo XIV
- Bishop: Blaise Nzeyimana

The Roman Catholic Diocese of Ruyigi (Latin: Ruyigen(sis)) is a diocese located in the city of Ruyigi in the ecclesiastical province of Gitega in Burundi.

== History ==
- April 13, 1973: Established as Diocese of Ruyigi from the Metropolitan Archdiocese of Gitega and Diocese of Ngozi

== Bishops ==
- Bishops of Ruyigi (Roman rite), in reverse chronological order
  - Bishop Blaise Nzeyimana (since October 30, 2010)
  - Bishop Joseph Nduhirubusa (April 19, 1980 – October 30, 2010)
  - Bishop Joachim Ruhuna (April 13, 1973 – March 28, 1980), appointed Coadjutor Archbishop of Gitega

=== Other priest of this diocese who became bishop ===
Joachim Ntahondereye, appointed Bishop of Muyinga in 2002

== See also ==
- Roman Catholicism in Burundi
