= Islam in Burundi =

Islam is a minority religion in Burundi where approximately 90 percent of the national population are followers of Christianity. Between 2–5 percent of the population identifies as Muslim, according to a 2010 estimate by the U.S. Department of State. The same year, the Pew Research Center (PEW) estimated that there were 230,000 Muslims in Burundi, equivalent to 2.8 percent of Burundi's 8.4 million inhabitants.

== Religion ==
=== History ===
Islam first arrived in Burundi from the East African coast with Arab traders in the late 19th century. The Arabs were prevented from entering the Kingdom of Burundi by a successful campaign of resistance led by mwami ("king") Mwezi IV Gisabo. However, they did establish settlements at Ujiji and Uvira close to the country's current borders. The number of Muslims in Burundi increased under German colonial rule (1894–1916) and the German administration favoured the use of Swahili, spoken mostly by the Muslim population, over Kirundi. By the outbreak of World War I, Usumbura (now Bujumbura) had a population which was majority Muslim. The religion declined under Belgian colonial rule (1916–1962) as a result of the spread of Christianity (especially Catholicism) and urbanisation which brought non-Muslim Burundians into the cities.

=== Today ===
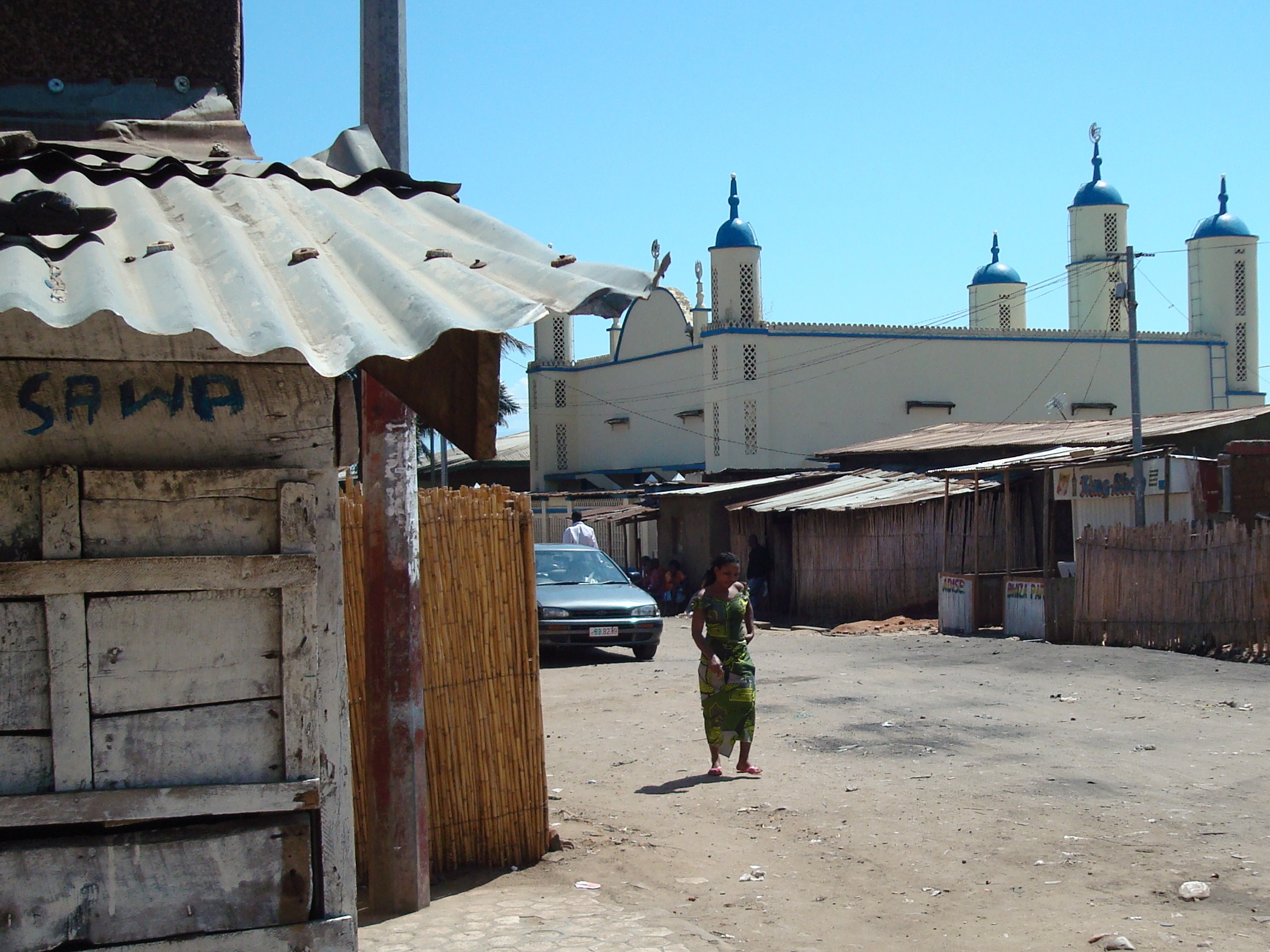
A mosque in Bujumbura, pictured in 2009. The green colouring of its roof is symbolic.

Today the Muslim population is strongly urbanised and focused in Bujumbura, especially in the communes (districts) of Buyenzi and Bwiza, as well as the towns of Gitega, Rumonge, Nyanza, Muyinga, and Makamba. The great majority are Sunni while a small minority are Shia and Ibadi. Most are Swahili speakers although they may speak other national languages as well. Native Burundian Muslims belong to both of the country's major ethnic groups (Hutu and Tutsi) and largely avoided becoming involved in the Burundian genocides and other inter-ethnic violence since independence. However, a significant proportion of the community are recent immigrants to the country from West Africa, the Democratic Republic of the Congo (DRC), the Middle East, and Pakistan.

The Republic of Burundi is officially secular but several Muslim festivals, including Eid al-Fitr and Eid al-Adha, are celebrated as national holidays alongside Christian observances. Despite being only a small proportion of the national population, Muslims are represented in senior positions in Burundian politics and society, especially since the end of the Burundian civil war.

== See also ==
- Glossary of Islam
- Outline of Islam
- Index of Islam-related articles
- Religion in Burundi
- Islam in Africa
- Union for Peace and Democracy
