= Gervais Banshimiyubusa =

Burundian Catholic prelate (born 1952

The Most Reverend Gervais Banshimiyubusa
- Archbishop of Bujumbura, Burundi
- Church: Catholic Church
- Archdiocese: Roman Catholic Archdiocese of Bujumbura
- See: Bujumbura
- Appointed: 24 March 2018
- Installed: 24 March 2018
- Predecessor: Evariste Ngoyagoye
- Successor: Incumbent
- Other posts: Coadjutor Bishop of Ngozi, Burundi (10 May 2000 - 14 December 2002); Bishop of Ngozi (14 December 2002 - 24 March 2018); Apostolic Administrator of Ngozi (24 March 2018 - 24 January 2020)

Orders
- Ordination: 4 July 1981
- Consecration: 16 September 2000 by Stanislas Kaburungu
- Rank: Bishop

Personal details
- Born: Gervais Banshimiyubusa; 9 September 1952 (age 74) Gisuru, Ruanda-Urundi

Styles of Gervais Banshimiyubusa
- Reference style: Your Grace; The Most Reverend
- Spoken style: His Grace
- Religious style: Bishop

Gervais Banshimiyubusa, (born 9 September 1952), is a Burundian Roman Catholic prelate who serves as the Archbishop of the Roman Catholic Archdiocese of Bujumbura, Burundi since 2018. Before that, from December 2002 until March 2018 he was Bishop of the Roman Catholic Diocese of Ngozi, Burundi. Previously, he was Coadjutor Bishop of Ngozi Diocese from May 2000 until December 2002. He also served as Apostolic Administrator of the diocese of Ngozi from 24 March 2018 until 25 January 2020. He was appointed Bishop on 10 May 2000 by Pope John Paul II.

== Background and priesthood ==
He was born on 9 September 1952, at Gisuru, Burundi. He studied both philosophy and theology before he was ordained a priest on 4 July 1981.

== Priest ==
He was ordained a priest on 4 July 1981, two months shy of his 29th birthday. He served in that capacity until 10 May 2000.

== As bishop ==
On 10 May 2000, Pope John Paul II appointed Reverend Father Monsignor Gervais Banshimiyubusa as Coadjutor Bishop of the Roman Catholic Diocese of Ngozi in Burundi. The new bishop was to work with, assist, study and later succeed the then Ordinary Bishop Stanislas Kaburungu. He was consecrated and installed at Ngozi, Diocese of Ngozi on 16 September 2000 by the hands of Bishop Stanislas Kaburungu, Bishop of Ngozi assisted by Bishop Evariste Ngoyagoye, Bishop of Bujumbura and Bishop Joseph Nduhirubusa, Bishop of Ruyigi. On 14 December 2002 he succeeded at Ngozi Diocese following the resignation of Bishop Kaburungu.

On 24 March 2018 he was appointed Archbishop of the Metropolitan Province of Bujumbura. On the same day he was appointed Apostolic Administrator of the Roman Catholic Diocese of Ngozi. His administration of Ngozi Diocese ceased on 25 January 2020 when Bishop Georges Bizimana was installed as the new bishop there. At Bujumbura, he succeeded Archbishop Evariste Ngoyagoye who retired, having attained the retirement age of 75 years.

== See also ==
- Catholic Church in Burundi

== Succession table ==
Catholic Church titles
Preceded by None	Coadjutor Bishop of Ngozi (10 May 2000 - 14 December 2002)	Succeeded by None
Preceded by Stanislas Kaburungu (5 September 1968 - 14 December 2002)	Bishop of Ngozi (14 December 2002 - 24 March 2018)	Succeeded by Georges Bizimana (since 17 December 2019)
Preceded by Evariste Ngoyagoye (25 November 2006 - 24 March 2018)	Archbishop of Bujumbura (since 24 March 2018)	Succeeded by Incumbent
