= Evariste Ngoyagoye =

Burundian Roman Catholic prelate (born 1942)

The Most Reverend Evariste Ngoyagoye
- Archbishop Emeritus of Bujumbura, Burundi
- Church: Catholic Church
- Archdiocese: Roman Catholic Archdiocese of Bujumbura
- See: Bujumbura
- Appointed: 25 November 2006
- Installed: 25 November 2006
- Term ended: 24 March 2018
- Predecessor: Simon Ntamwana
- Successor: Gervais Banshimiyubusa
- Other posts: Bishop of Bubanza, Burundi (7 June 1980 - 21 April 1997); Bishop of Bujumbura (21 April 1997 - 25 November 2006)

Orders
- Ordination: 6 January 1966 by Pope Paul VI
- Consecration: 24 August 1980 by Donato Squicciarini
- Rank: Archbishop

Personal details
- Born: Evariste Ngoyagoye; 3 January 1942 (age 84) Jenda, Bururi Province, Burundi

Styles of Evariste Ngoyagoye
- Reference style: Your Grace; The Most Reverend
- Spoken style: His Grace
- Religious style: Bishop

Évariste Ngoyagoye (born 3 January 1942), is a Burundian Roman Catholic prelate who served as the Archbishop of the Roman Catholic Archdiocese of Bujumbura from 2006 until his age-related retirement in 2018. Before that, from 1977 until 2006, he worked as bishop in the Roman Catholic Diocese of Bujumbura before the diocese was elevated to an archdiocese. He was appointed bishop on 7 June 1980 by Pope Paul VI. He served as bishop of the Roman Catholic Diocese of Bubanza, Burundi from 1980 until 1977 when he was transferred to Bujumbura. He retired from pastoral service on 24 March 2018 at the age of 76 years and two months. He lives on as Archbishop Emeritus of Bujumbura, Burundi.

== Early life and education ==
He was born on 3 January 1942 at Jenda, Bururi Province, Burundi. He studied philosophy and theology before he was ordained a priest in 1966.

== Priest ==
He was ordained a priest of the Diocese of Bujumbura on 6 January 1966, by the hands of Pope Paul VI. He served in that capacity until 7 June 1980.

== Bishop ==
On 7 June 1980 Pope John Paul II appointed him bishop of the Roman Catholic Diocese of Bubanza in Burundi. He was consecrated and installed at the Christ the King Cathedral, in Bubanza, Diocese of Bubanza on 24 August 1980. The Principal Consecrator was Archbishop Donato Squicciarini, Titular Archbishop of Tiburnia assisted by Bishop Michel Ntuyahaga, Bishop of Bujumbura and Archbishop Joachim Ruhuna, Coadjutor Archbishop of Gitega. He served in that capacity until 21 April 1997. On 21 April 1997 The Holy Father appointed him bishop of the Diocese of Bujumbura. He served there in that capacity until 25 November 2006.

On 25 November 2006, Pope Benedict XVI, created the Roman Catholic Archdiocese of Bujumbura by elevating the Diocese of Bujumbura. On the same day, he appointed Bishop Evariste Ngoyagoye as the founding archbishop of the new Metropolitan Province of Bujumbura, thereby elevating him to an Archbishop.

On 24 March 2018 the Pope Francis accepted the resignation of the pastoral care of the archdiocese of Bujumbura, in Burundi that was presented by Bishop Evariste Ngoyagoye. The Holy Father appointed Bishop Gervais Banshimiyubusa, at that time the Bishop of Ngozi, as Archbishop of the Metropolitan Province of Bujumbura.

== See also ==
- Catholic Church in Burundi

== Succession table ==
Catholic Church titles
Preceded by None (Diocese Erected)	Bishop of Bubanza (7 June 1980 - 21 April 1997)	Succeeded by Jean Ntagwarara
Preceded by Simon Ntamwana (14 November 1988 - 24 January 1997)	Bishop of Bujumbura (21 April 1997 - 25 November 2006)	Succeeded by None (Diocese elevated to Archdiocese)
Preceded by None (Archdiocese created)	Archbishop of Bujumbura (25 November 2006 - 24 March 2018)	Succeeded by Gervais Banshimiyubusa (since 24 March 2018)
