= Languages of Burundi =

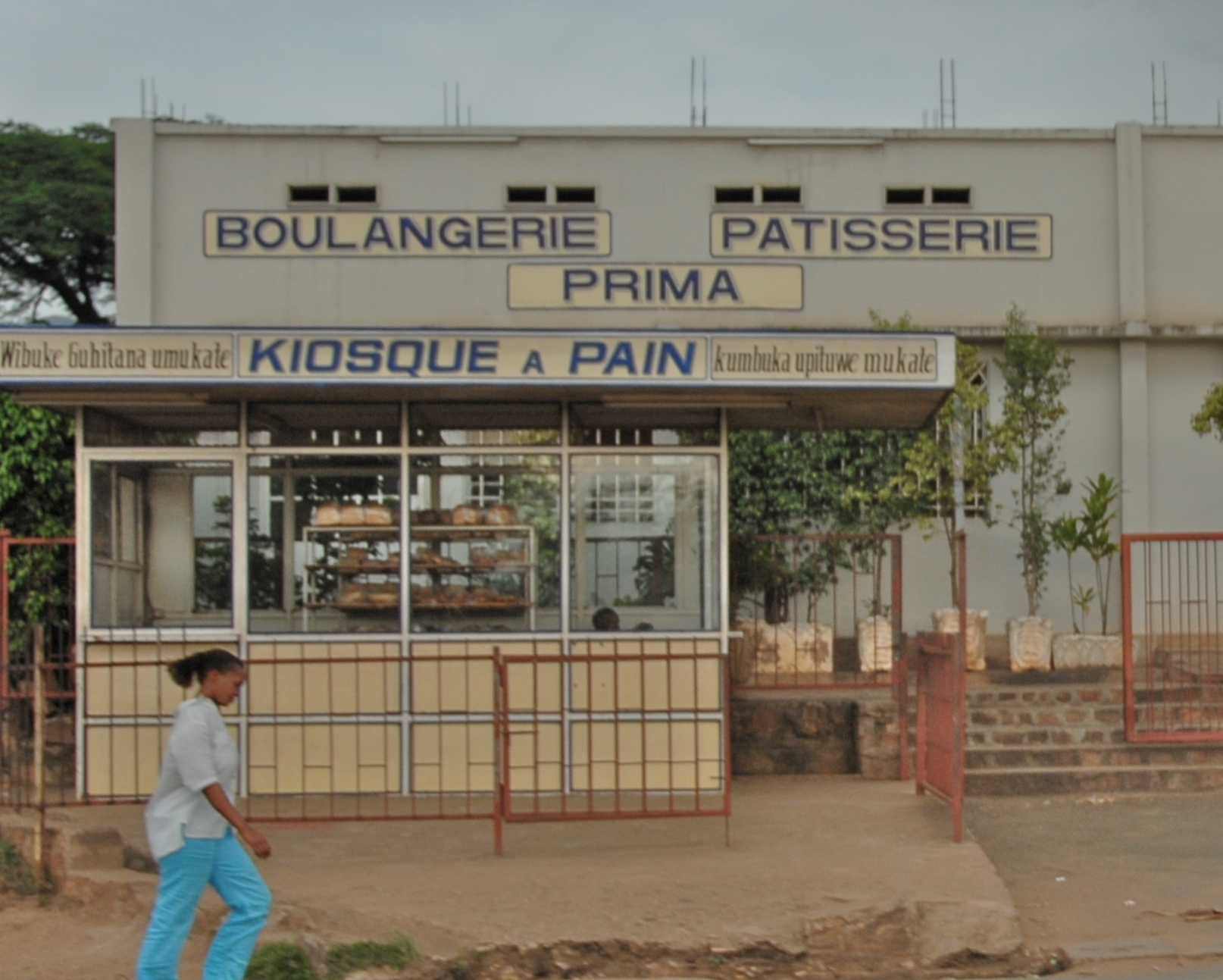
- A bakery in Bujumbura, incorporating signage in French and Kirundi
- Official: Kirundi, French, English
- National: Kirundi
- Minority: Swahili
- Foreign: Arabic, English, Swahili
- Signed: Burundian Sign Language
- Keyboard layout: QWERTY

The three official languages of Burundi are Kirundi, French, and English. Of these, Kirundi is the only one spoken by the vast majority of the country's population. It is recognised as the national language by the Burundian constitution of 2005. English received official status only in 2014.

Burundi is unusual among African states in having a single common indigenous language. In one estimate, 98 percent of Burundians speak Kirundi. Under Belgian colonial rule (1919–62), Kirundi was taught, whereas under German rule (1894–1916), Swahili had been encouraged. In recent years, the Burundian government has promoted the use of the Kirundi language as a way to unify the country's different ethnic groups.

The country is considered part of Francophonie. As a legacy of Belgian colonial rule, French has an important role in government, business, and the educated classes but only between 3 and 10 percent of the population speak the language fluently. Burundian vernacular French also frequently incorporates loanwords from Kirundi, Lingala and other languages. French is spoken by a significant minority and is spoken mainly as a second language, as a French pidgin, or by foreign residents of the country. English was adopted as part of moves towards regional integration with the East African Community after 2007 but has little effective presence in the country.

Spoken languages in Burundi include Swahili which is widely spoken in the Great Lakes region. It is especially used in commerce and in connection with the country's Muslim minority or with immigration from elsewhere in East Africa.

== See also ==
- Culture of Burundi
- Languages of Rwanda
