= Roman Catholic Diocese of Muyinga =

Latin Catholic diocese in Burundi

Diocese of Muyinga Dioecesis Muyinganus

Location
- Country: Burundi
- Ecclesiastical province: Gitega

Statistics
- Area: 4,000 km^{2} (1,500 sq mi)
- Population: Total; Catholics: (as of 2004); 996,029; 565,441 (56.8%)

Information
- Denomination: Catholic Church
- Sui iuris church: Latin Church
- Rite: Roman Rite

Current leadership
- Pope: Leo XIV
- Bishop: Joachim Ntahondereye

The Diocese of Muyinga (Latin: Muyingan(us)) is a Latin Church diocese of the Catholic Church located in the city of Muyinga in the ecclesiastical province of the Archdiocese of Gitega in Burundi.

== History ==
- 5 September 1968: Established as Diocese of Muyinga from the Diocese of Ngozi

== Special churches ==
The cathedral is Our Lady of Lourdes Cathedral in Muyinga.

== Bishops ==
- Bishops of Muyinga, in reverse chronological order
  - Bishop Joachim Ntahondereye (since 14 December 2002)
  - Bishop Jean-Berchmans Nterere (1 July 1994 – 5 May 2001)
  - Bishop Roger Mpungu (6 March 1980 – 1 July 1994)
  - Bishop Nestor Bihonda (5 September 1968 – 25 March 1977)

=== Coadjutor bishop ===
- Jean-Berchmans Nterere (1992-1994)

== See also ==
- Catholic Church in Burundi
