= Jean-Berchmans Nterere =

Burundian clergyman and bishop

- Bishop of Muyinga
- Church: Catholic Church
- In office: 1 July 1994 – 5 May 2001
- Predecessor: Roger Mpungu
- Successor: Joachim Ntahondereye
- Previous post: Coadjutor Bishop of Muyinga (1992-1994)

Orders
- Ordination: 11 October 1970
- Consecration: 10 May 1992 by Roger Mpungu

Personal details
- Born: 1 September 1942 Nkuna, Kingdom of Burundi, Mandatory Ruanda-Urundi, Belgian Empire
- Died: 5 May 2001 (aged 58)

Jean-Berchmans Nterere (1 September 1942 in Nkuna – 2001) was a Burundian prelate and bishop for the Roman Catholic Diocese of Muyinga. He became ordained in 1970. He was appointed bishop in 1992.
