= Freedom of religion in Burundi =

The Constitution of Burundi provides for freedom of religion, and the Government generally respects this right in practice. Government policy contributes to the generally free practice of religion. In a 2007 US Government study, there were no reports of societal abuses or discrimination based on religious belief or practice.

== Religious demography ==
The country has an area of 10,747 square miles (27,830 km^{2}) and a population of 8,390,500. Although reliable statistics on the followers of various religious groups are not available, sources estimate the Christian population to be 67 percent, with Roman Catholics representing the largest group at 62 percent. Protestant and Anglican practitioners comprise the remaining 5 percent. The local representative of the Holy See estimates the Catholic population to be closer to 65 percent. An estimated 23 percent of the population adheres to traditional indigenous religious beliefs; some of the traditional indigenous groups promoted cures for HIV, AIDS and other ailments. The Muslim population is estimated to be as high as 10 percent, the majority of whom live in urban areas. Sunnis make up the majority of the Muslim population, and the remainder is Shi'a.

Foreign missionary groups are active in the country.

== Status of religious freedom ==
=== Legal and policy framework ===
The Constitution, promulgated in March 2005, provides for freedom of religion, and the Government generally respected this right in practice. The Government sought to protect this right and did not tolerate its abuse, either by governmental or private actors. Discrimination on the basis of religious conviction is prohibited. A 1992 law covering nonprofit organizations, including religious groups, is the basis for the recognition and registration of religious bodies.

There is no state religion.

The Government requires religious groups to register with the Ministry of the Interior. Each association with a religious nature must file the following with the ministry: the denomination or affiliation of the religious institution, a copy of its statutes, the address of its headquarters in the country, an address abroad if the local religious institution is a subsidiary, and information about the association's governing body and legal representative. If an association with a religious nature fails to register with the Ministry, its representative is reminded of the requirement to do so. If the representative does not comply, the place of worship or association is instructed to close down. Although the representative of the religious institution or association can be jailed for 6 months to 5 years for failing to comply with these instructions, during the reporting period no representative received this penalty.

The Government requires that all religious groups maintain a headquarters in the country.

While there is no law that accords tax exemptions to religious groups, the Government often waives taxes on imported religious articles used by religious institutions and on the importation by religious institutions of goods destined for social development purposes. The Finance Ministry negotiates these exemptions on a case-by-case basis, and there is no indication of religious bias in the awarding of such exemptions.

The heads of major religious organizations are accorded diplomatic status. Foreign missionary groups openly promote their religious beliefs. The Government has welcomed their development assistance.

The Government recognizes Catholic holy days, including the Assumption, the Ascension, All Saints' Day, and Christmas. In 2005 the Government also officially recognized the Islamic holy days of Eid al-Fitr, commemorating the end of Ramadan, and Eid al-Adha, which is celebrated at the end of the Hajj.

=== Restrictions on religious freedom ===
Government policy and practice contributed to the generally free practice of religion.

=== Abuses of religious freedom ===
There were no known abuses of religious freedom by the Government during the period covered by this report.

In the past, the Party for the Liberation of the Hutu People-National Liberation Force (PALIPEHUTU-FNL) was considered responsible for the killings of religious adherents, including five civilians attending a religious service in Bujumbura Rural Province in June 2005 and Catholic priest Gerard Nzeyimana in Makamba Province in October 2004. No one has been charged in these killings.

There were no reports of religious prisoners or detainees in the country.

=== Forced religious conversion ===
There were no reports of forced religious conversion, including of minor U.S. citizens who had been abducted or illegally removed from the United States, or of the refusal to allow such citizens to be returned to the United States.

== Societal abuses and discrimination ==
There were no reports of societal abuses or discrimination based on religious belief or practice.

== International Views ==
In 2022, Freedom House rated Burundi religious freedom as 3 out of 4, noting that relations between the government and the Roman Catholic Church have worsened in recent years.

A 2021 report noted that the government recognizes and registers religious groups through a 2014 law governing the operational framework of religious groups, which states these organizations must register with the Ministry of Interior.

== See also ==
- Religion in Burundi
- Human rights in Burundi

== Sources ==
- United States Bureau of Democracy, Human Rights and Labor. Burundi: International Religious Freedom Report 2007. This article incorporates text from this source, which is in the public domain.
