= Stanislas Kaburungu =

RC bishop from Burundi

- Bishop Emeritus of Ngozi
- Church: Catholic Church
- Diocese: Diocese of Ngozi
- In office: 5 September 1968 – 14 December 2002
- Predecessor: André Makarakiza
- Successor: Gervais Banshimiyubusa

Orders
- Ordination: 3 September 1961
- Consecration: 25 January 1969 by André Makarakiza

Personal details
- Born: 7 October 1935 (age 91) Gisanze, (south of Bururi), Kingdom of Burundi, Mandatory Ruanda-Urundi, Belgian Empire

Stanislas Kaburungu (born 7 October 1935 in Gisanze) is a Burundian prelate and bishop for the Roman Catholic Diocese of Ngozi. He became ordained in 1961 and was appointed bishop in 1968. He resigned in 2002.
