= Joseph Nduhirubusa =

Burundian Roman Catholic bishop

- Bishop of Ruyigi
- Church: Catholic Church
- Diocese: Diocese of Ruyigi
- In office: 19 April 1980 – 30 October 2010
- Predecessor: Joachim Ruhuna
- Successor: Blaise Nzeyimana

Orders
- Ordination: 21 July 1964
- Consecration: 4 May 1980 by Pope John Paul II

Personal details
- Born: 24 April 1938 Kigarika, Kingdom of Burundi, mandatory Territory of Ruanda-Urundi, Belgian Empire
- Died: 16 July 2012 (aged 74)

Joseph Nduhirubusa (24 April 1938 – 16 July 2012) was the Roman Catholic bishop of the Roman Catholic Diocese of Ruyigi, Burundi.

Ordained to the priesthood in 1964, Nduhirubusa was and named bishop in 1980 and resigned in 2010. He was also considered an advocate for human rights.
