= Joachim Ntahondereye =

Burundian bishop (born 1953)

- Bishop of Muyinga
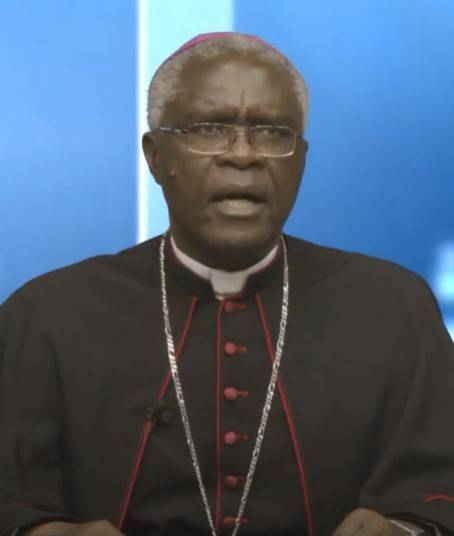
- Ntahondereye in 2020
- Church: Catholic Church
- Diocese: Diocese of Muyinga
- Appointed: 14 December 2002
- Predecessor: Jean-Berchmans Nterere

Orders
- Ordination: 16 November 1980
- Consecration: 1 March 2003 by Simon Ntamwana

Personal details
- Born: 8 May 1953 (age 73) Camazi (in present-day Gisagara), Kingdom of Burundi, Ruanda-Urundi, Belgian Empire

Joachim Ntahondereye (born on 8 May 1953 in Camazi, Burundi) is a bishop in the Catholic Church. He was appointed Bishop of the Roman Catholic Diocese of Muyinga in Muyinga, Burundi, on 14 December 2002. Previously, he was appointed priest of Ruyigi, Burundi, on 16 November 1980. On Wednesday, 21 March 2012, Bishop Ntahondereye was appointed a Consultor of the Pontifical Council for the Pastoral Care of Health Care Workers by Pope Benedict XVI. Since 09 December 2016, Bishop Joachim Ntahondereye has been President of the Burundian Conference of Catholic Bishops.
