= Diocese of Bubanza =

Roman Catholic diocese in Burundi

Diocese of Bubanza Dioecesis Bubantina

Location
- Country: Burundi
- Metropolitan: Bujumbura
- Coordinates: 3.0828°S 29.3942°E

Statistics
- Area: 2,712 km^{2} (1,047 sq mi)
- Population: Total; Catholics: (as of 2004); 632,218; 2,712 (52.5%)

Information
- Rite: Latin Rite

Current leadership
- Pope: Leo XIV
- Bishop: Emmanuel Ntakarutimana
- Bishops emeritus: Jean Ntagwarara

The Roman Catholic Diocese of Bubanza (Latin: Bubantin(a)) is a diocese located in the city of Bubanza in the ecclesiastical province of Bujumbura in Burundi.

== History ==
- June 7, 1980: Established as the Roman Catholic Diocese of Bubanza from the then-Roman Catholic Diocese of Bujumbura

== Special churches ==
The Cathedral is the Cathédrale Christ Roi (Cathedral of Christ the King) in Bubanza.

== Leadership ==
Bishops of Bubanza

- Evariste Ngoyagoye (June 7, 1980 – April 21, 1997), appointed Bishop of Bujumbura
- Jean Ntagwarara (October 24, 1997 – April 1, 2023)
- Emmanuel Ntakarutimana (since 15 February 2025)

Coadjutor bishop

- Georges Bizimana (2013-2019), did not succeed to see; appointed Bishop of Ngozi

== See also ==
- Roman Catholicism in Burundi
