= Regina Mundi Cathedral, Bujumbura =

Coordinates: 3.3919°S 29.3637°E

Queen of the World Cathedral
- Cathédrale Regina Mundi de Bujumbura
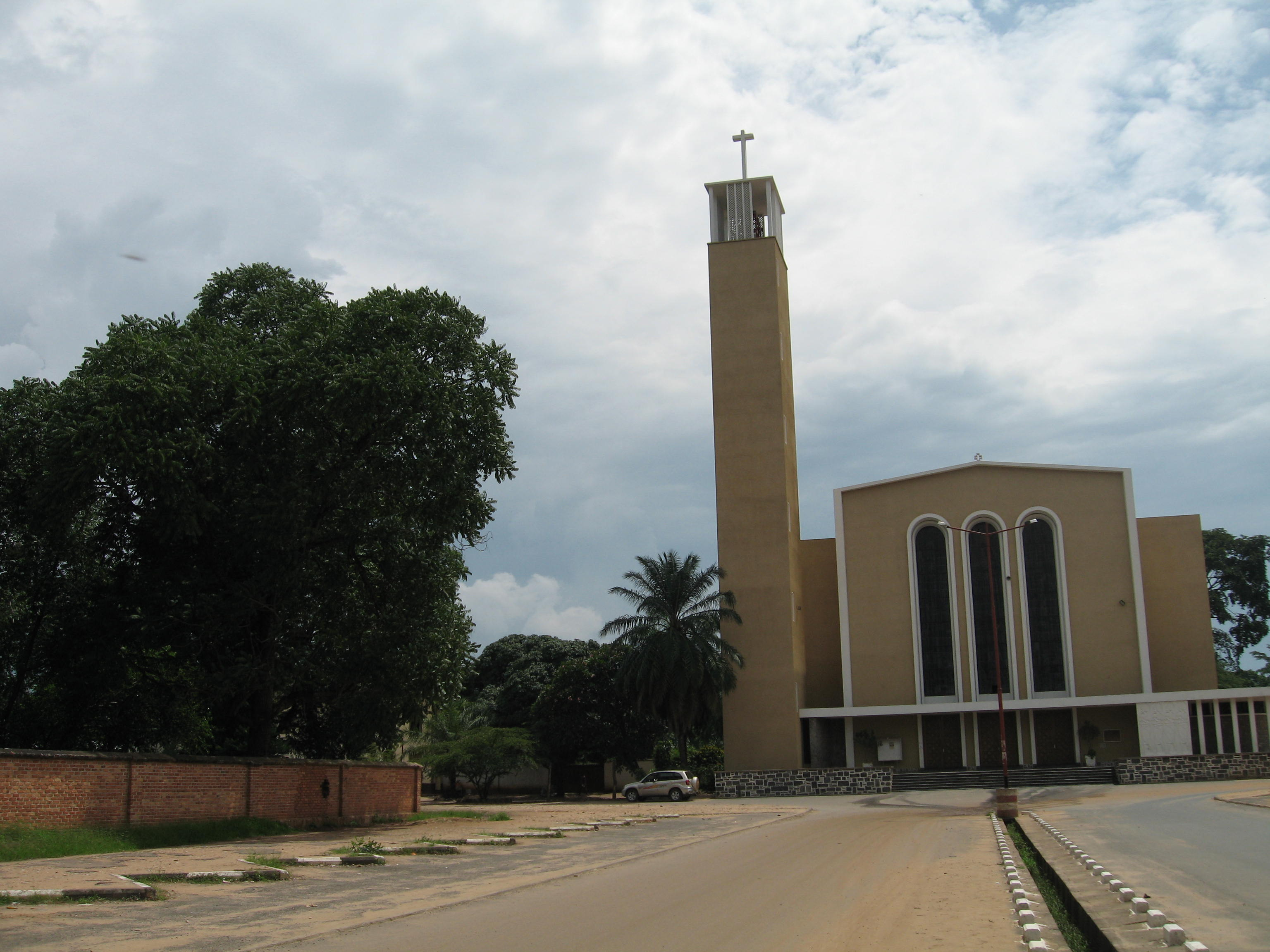
- Queen of the World Cathedral
- Location: Bujumbura
- Country: Burundi
- Denomination: Roman Catholic Church

Specifications
- Capacity: 2,100

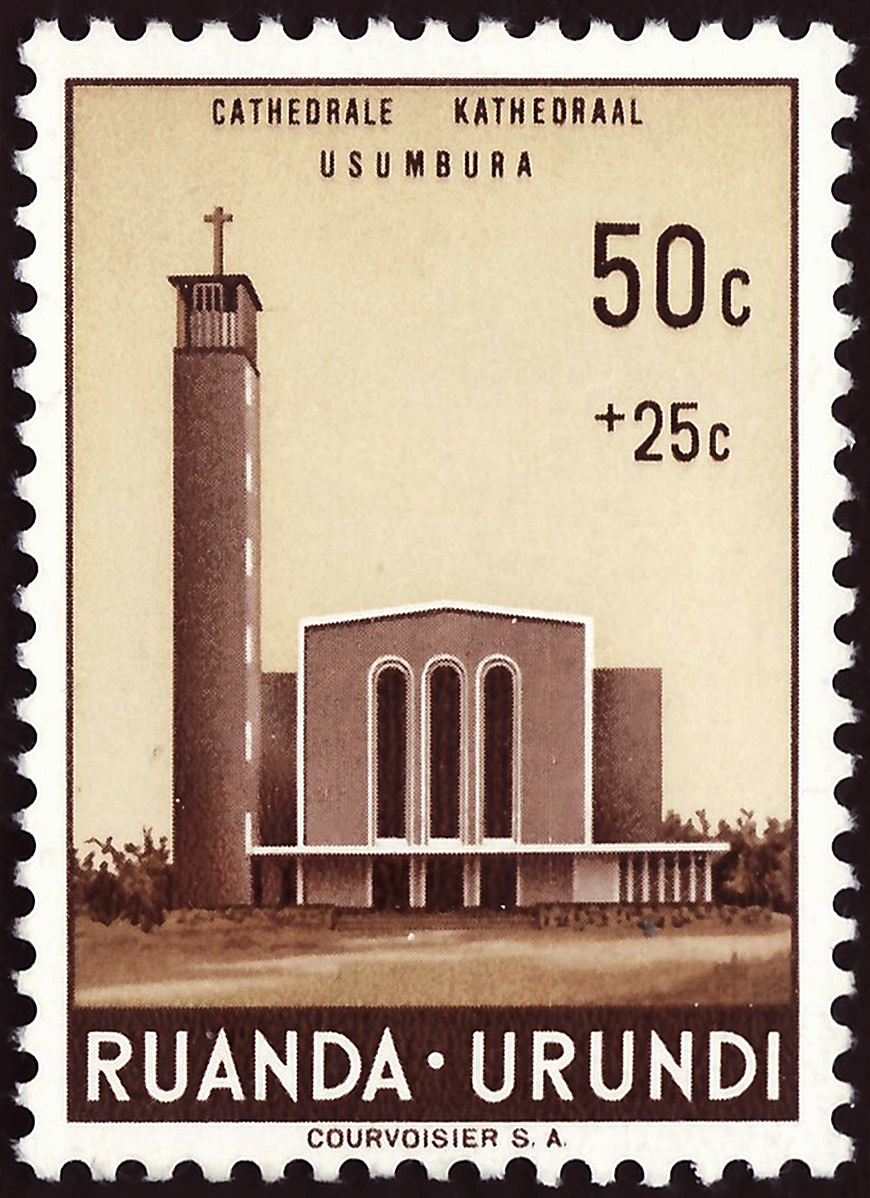
The cathedral on a 1961 stamp

The Regina Mundi Cathedral (French: Cathédrale Regina Mundi de Bujumbura, literally the "Cathedral of the Queen of the World in Bujumbura") is a Catholic church in the city of Bujumbura, the former capital of the African country of Burundi.

It functions as the headquarters of the Metropolitan Archdiocese of Bujumbura (Latin: Archidioecesis Buiumburaensis) that was created on November 25, 2006 by Pope Benedict XVI through the bull Cum ad aptius.

Follow the Roman or Latin rite and is included in the ecclesiastical province of Bujumbura. It is under the pastoral responsibility of Archbishop Evariste Ngoyagoye.

== See also ==
- Roman Catholicism in Burundi
