= Archdiocese of Bujumbura =

Roman Catholic archdiocese in Burundi

Coordinates: 3.3920°S 29.3645°E

Archdiocese of Bujumbura Archidioecesis Buiumburaensis
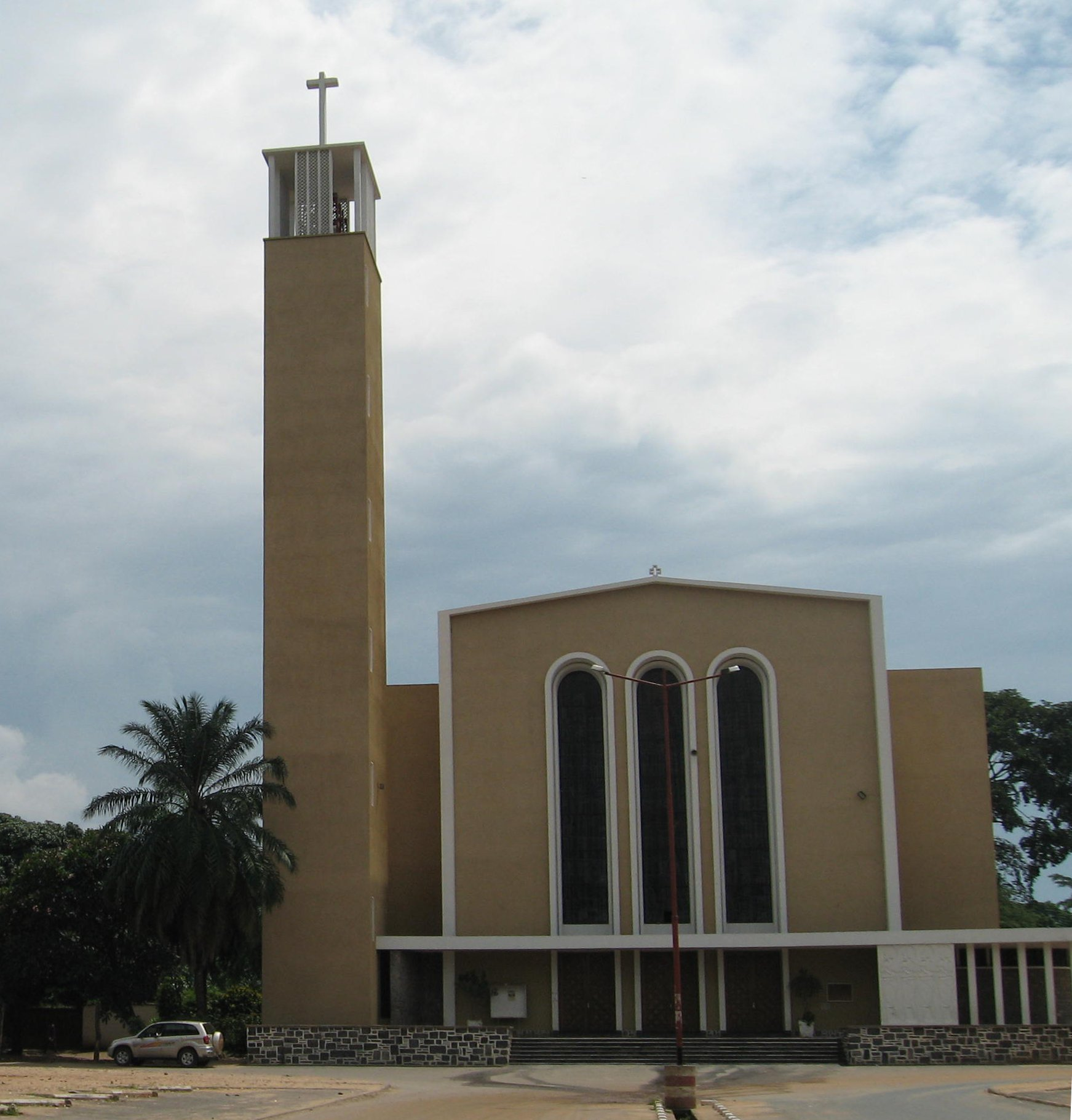
- Bujumbura Cathedral

Location
- Country: Burundi

Statistics
- Area: 2,200 km^{2} (850 sq mi)
- Population: Total; Catholics: (as of 2006); 1,693,000; 1,294,646 (76.5%)

Information
- Rite: Latin Rite

Current leadership
- Pope: Leo XIV
- Bishop: Gervais Banshimiyubusa
- Bishops emeritus: Evariste Ngoyagoye

The Roman Catholic Archdiocese of Bujumbura (Latin: Buiumburaën(sis)) is the Metropolitan See for the ecclesiastical province of Bujumbura in Burundi.

== History ==
- June 11, 1959: Established as Apostolic Vicariate of Usumbura from the Apostolic Vicariate of Kitega and Apostolic Vicariate of Ngozi
- November 10, 1959: Promoted as Diocese of Usumbura
- October 9, 1964: Renamed as Diocese of Bujumbura
- November 25, 2006: Promoted as Metropolitan Archdiocese of Bujumbura

== Special churches ==
The cathedral is the Cathédrale Regina Mundi in Bujumbura.

== Leadership, in reverse chronological order ==
- Metropolitan Archbishops of Bujumbura (Roman rite), below
  - Archbishop Gervais Banshimiyubusa (since March 24, 2018)
  - Archbishop Evariste Ngoyagoye (November 25, 2006 – March 24, 2018); see below
- Bishops of Bujumbura (Roman rite), below
  - Bishop Evariste Ngoyagoye (April 21, 1997 – November 25, 2006); see above
  - Bishop Simon Ntamwana (November 14, 1988 – January 24, 1997), appointed Archbishop of Gitega
  - Bishop Michel Ntuyahaga (October 9, 1964 – November 14, 1988); see below
- Bishop of Usumbura (Roman rite), below
  - Bishop Michel Ntuyahaga (November 10, 1959 – October 9, 1964); see above & below
- Vicar Apostolic of Usumbura (Roman rite), below
  - Bishop Michel Ntuyahaga (June 11, 1959 – November 10, 1959); see above

== Sufferagan Dioceses ==
- Bubanza
- Bururi

== See also ==
- Roman Catholicism in Burundi
- List of Roman Catholic dioceses in Burundi

== Sources ==
- GCatholic.org
- Catholic Hierarchy
