= Roman Catholic Diocese of Rutana =

Roman Catholic diocese in Burundi

Diocese of Rutana Dioecesis Rutana Diocèse de Rutana

Location
- Country: Burundi
- Metropolitan: Archdiocese of Gitega
- Headquarters: Rutana, Rutana Province, Burundi

Statistics
- Area: 2,180 km^{2} (840 sq mi)
- Population: Total; Catholics: (as of 2023); 713,652; 259,036 (36.3%)
- Parishes: 16

Information
- Denomination: Catholic Church
- Sui iuris church: Latin Church
- Rite: Roman Rite
- Established: 17 January 2009; 17 years ago
- Cathedral: Cathédrale Saint-Joseph de Rutana
- Secular priests: 58 (48 Diocesan, 10 Religious Orders)

Current leadership
- Pope: Leo XIV
- Bishop: Léonidas Nitereka
- Metropolitan Archbishop: Bonaventure Nahimana

The Roman Catholic Diocese of Rutana (Latin: Dioecesis Rutanus) is a diocese located in the city of Rutana in the ecclesiastical province of Gitega in Burundi.

== History ==
- 17 January 2009: Established as Diocese of Rutana from Diocese of Bururi and Diocese of Ruyigi.

== Special churches ==
The Cathedral is the Cathédrale Saint-Joseph in Rutana.

== Bishops ==
Bishops of Rutana (Roman rite)

- Bonaventure Nahimana (17 January 2009 – 19 February 2022), appointed Archbishop of Gitega
  - Apostolic Administrator Bonaventure Nahimana (19 February 2022 – 12 April 2025), Archbishop of Gitega
- Léonidas Nitereka (15 February 2025 – Present)

== See also ==
- Roman Catholicism in Burundi
