= Public holidays in Burundi =

This is a list of public holidays in Burundi.

Date	English name	Comments
January 1	New Year's Day	
February 5	Unity Day	Intended to help reconcile ethnic differences between the Tutsi and the Hutu.
April 6	Ntaryamira Day	Marks the anniversary of President Ntaryamira's death in 1994.
May 1	Labour Day	International Workers' Day
April or May; 40 days after Easter	Ascension Day	
June 8	National Patriotism Day	Coincides with the anniversary of President Nkurunziza's death in 2020.
July 1	Independence Day	Independence from Belgium in 1962.
August 15	Assumption Day	
October 13	Rwagasore Day	Prince Louis Rwagasore was a nationalist, Prime Minister and the father of Independence of Burundi, assassinated in 1961.
October 21	Ndadaye Day	President Melchior Ndadaye, father of Democracy, was assassinated in 1993 and his death sparked the Burundian Civil War
November 1	All Saints' Day	
December 25	Christmas Day	
1 Shawwal date varies	Eid al-Fitr	This national holiday celebrates the end of Ramadan.
10 Dhu al-Hijjah date varies	Eid al-Adha	This national holiday is the holiest day of the Islamic year; it celebrates Abraham′s sacrifice of his son.

== Dates of variable holidays ==
2021

- Ascension: May 13
- Eid al-Adha: July 20

2022

- Labour Day: May 2
- Ascension: May 25
- Eid al-Adha: July 10
- Christmas: December 26

2023

- Ascension: May 18
- Eid al-Adha: June 28

2024

- Ascension: May 9
- Eid al-Adha: June 17

2025

- Ascension: May 29
- Eid al-Adha: June 7
