= Bernard Bududira =

Burundian clergyman and bishop

- Bishop of Bururi
- Church: Catholic Church
- Diocese: Diocese of Bururi
- In office: 17 September 1973 – 19 November 2005
- Predecessor: Joseph Martin
- Successor: Venant Bacinoni

Orders
- Ordination: 8 July 1963
- Consecration: 30 November 1973 by André Makarakiza

Personal details
- Born: August 1934 Mushikanwa (northeast of Mutaho), mandatory Territory of Ruanda-Urundi, Belgian Empire
- Died: 19 November 2005 (aged 71)

Bernard Bududira (born Aug 1934 in Mushikanwa; died 2005) was a Burundian clergyman and bishop for the Roman Catholic Diocese of Bururi. He was ordained in 1963 and was appointed bishop in 1973.
