= Simon Ntamwana =

Roman Catholic archbishop

The Most Reverend Simon Ntamwana
- Archbishop of Gitega
- Church: Roman Catholic Church
- Archdiocese: Gitega
- See: Gitega
- Appointed: 24 January 1997
- Predecessor: Joachim Ruhuna
- Previous post(s): Bishop of Bujumbura (1988-97); President of the Burundi Episcopal Conference (1997-2004); Apostolic Administrator of Bururi (2005-07); President of the Association of Episcopal Conferences of Central Africa (2007-13)

Orders
- Ordination: 24 March 1974 by Agnelo Rossi
- Consecration: 5 February 1989 by Bernardin Gantin

Personal details
- Born: Simon Ntamwana; 3 June 1946 (age 78); Mukenke, Ruanda-Urundi
- Motto: Charité et Patience

Simon Ntamwana (born 3 June 1946) has been the Roman Catholic archbishop of the Archdiocese of Gitega in Burundi since 1997. Ntamwana was ordained as a priest on 24 March 1974 and from 1988 to 1997 he was the bishop of the diocese in Bujumbura. In 1997 he succeeded Joachim Ruhuna as the archbishop of Gitega.

In 2009, he defended Pope Benedict XVI over a controversy on the refusal to give any kind of approval to condoms in the fight against AIDS.
