= Diocese of Ngozi =

Roman Catholic diocese in Burundi

Diocese of Ngozi Dioecesis Ngoziensis

Location
- Country: Burundi
- Metropolitan: Gitega

Statistics
- Area: 3,810 km^{2} (1,470 sq mi)
- Population: Total; Catholics: (as of 2004); 1,109,094; 937,373 (84.5%)

Information
- Rite: Latin Rite

Current leadership
- Pope: Leo XIV
- Bishop: Georges Bizimana
- Bishops emeritus: Stanislas Kaburungu

The Roman Catholic Diocese of Ngozi (Latin: Ngozien(sis)) is a diocese located in the city of Ngozi in the ecclesiastical province of Gitega in Burundi.

== History ==
- July 14, 1949: Established as Apostolic Vicariate of Ngozi from the Apostolic Vicariate of Urundi
- November 10, 1959: Promoted as Diocese of Ngozi

== Special churches ==
The Cathedral is the Our Lady of Fatima Cathedral in Ngozi.

== Bishops ==
=== Ordinaries, in reverse chronological order ===
- Bishops of Ngozi (Roman rite), below
  - Bishop Georges Bizimana (since December 17, 2019)
  - Bishop Gervais Banshimiyubusa (December 14, 2002 – March 24, 2018), appointed Archbishop of Bujumbura
  - Bishop Stanislas Kaburungu (September 5, 1968 – December 14, 2002)
  - Bishop André Makarakiza, M. Afr. (August 21, 1961 – September 5, 1968), appointed Archbishop of Gitega
  - Bishop Joseph Martin, M. Afr. (November 10, 1959 – June 6, 1961); see below
- Vicar Apostolic of Ngozi (Roman rite), below
  - Bishop Joseph Martin, M. Afr. (July 14, 1949 – November 10, 1959); see above

=== Coadjutor bishop ===
- Gervais Banshimiyubusa (2000-2002)

== See also ==
- Roman Catholicism in Burundi
