= Joachim Ruhuna =

- Archbishop of Gitega
- Church: Catholic Church
- Archdiocese: Archdiocese of Gitega
- In office: 6 November 1982 – 9 September 1996
- Predecessor: André Makarakiza
- Successor: Simon Ntamwana
- Previous posts: Coadjutor Archbishop of Gitega (1980-1982); Bishop of Ruyigi (1973-1980)

Orders
- Ordination: 18 September 1962
- Consecration: 25 July 1973 by André Makarakiza

Personal details
- Born: 27 October 1933 Nyabikere, Kingdom of Burundi, mandatory Territory of Ruanda-Urundi, Belgian Empire
- Died: 9 September 1996 (aged 62)

Joachim Ruhuna (27 October 1933 – 9 September 1996) was a Burundian Roman Catholic prelate who served as Archbishop of Gitega from 1983 until his murder by a gang of armed men in 1996.
