= Diocese of Bururi =

Roman Catholic diocese in Burundi

Coordinates: 3.9471°S 29.6334°E

Diocese of Bururi Dioecesis Bururiensis

Location
- Country: Burundi
- Metropolitan: Bujumbura

Statistics
- Area: 6,500 km^{2} (2,500 sq mi)
- Population: Total; Catholics: (as of 2004); 966,391; 413,960 (42.8%)

Information
- Rite: Latin Rite

Current leadership
- Pope: Leo XIV
- Bishop: Salvator Niciteretse
- Bishops emeritus: Venant Bacinoni

The Roman Catholic Diocese of Bururi (Latin: Bururien(sis)) is a diocese located in the city of Bururi in the ecclesiastical province of Bujumbura in Burundi.

== History ==
- June 6, 1961: Established as Diocese of Bururi from the Metropolitan Archdiocese of Gitega

== Special churches ==
The Cathedral is the Cathédrale Christ Roi in Bururi.

== Leadership ==
- Bishops of Bururi (Roman rite)
  - Bishop Joseph Martin, M. Afr. (June 6, 1961 – September 17, 1973)
  - Bishop Bernard Bududira (September 17, 1973 – November 19, 2005)
  - Bishop Venant Bacinoni (June 25, 2007 – February 15, 2020)
  - Bishop Salvatore Niciteretse (February 15, 2020 – ...)

== See also ==
- Roman Catholicism in Burundi
