= Archdiocese of Gitega =

Roman Catholic archdiocese in Burundi

Coordinates: 3.4333°S 29.9000°E

Archdiocese of Gitega Archidioecesis Kitegaensis
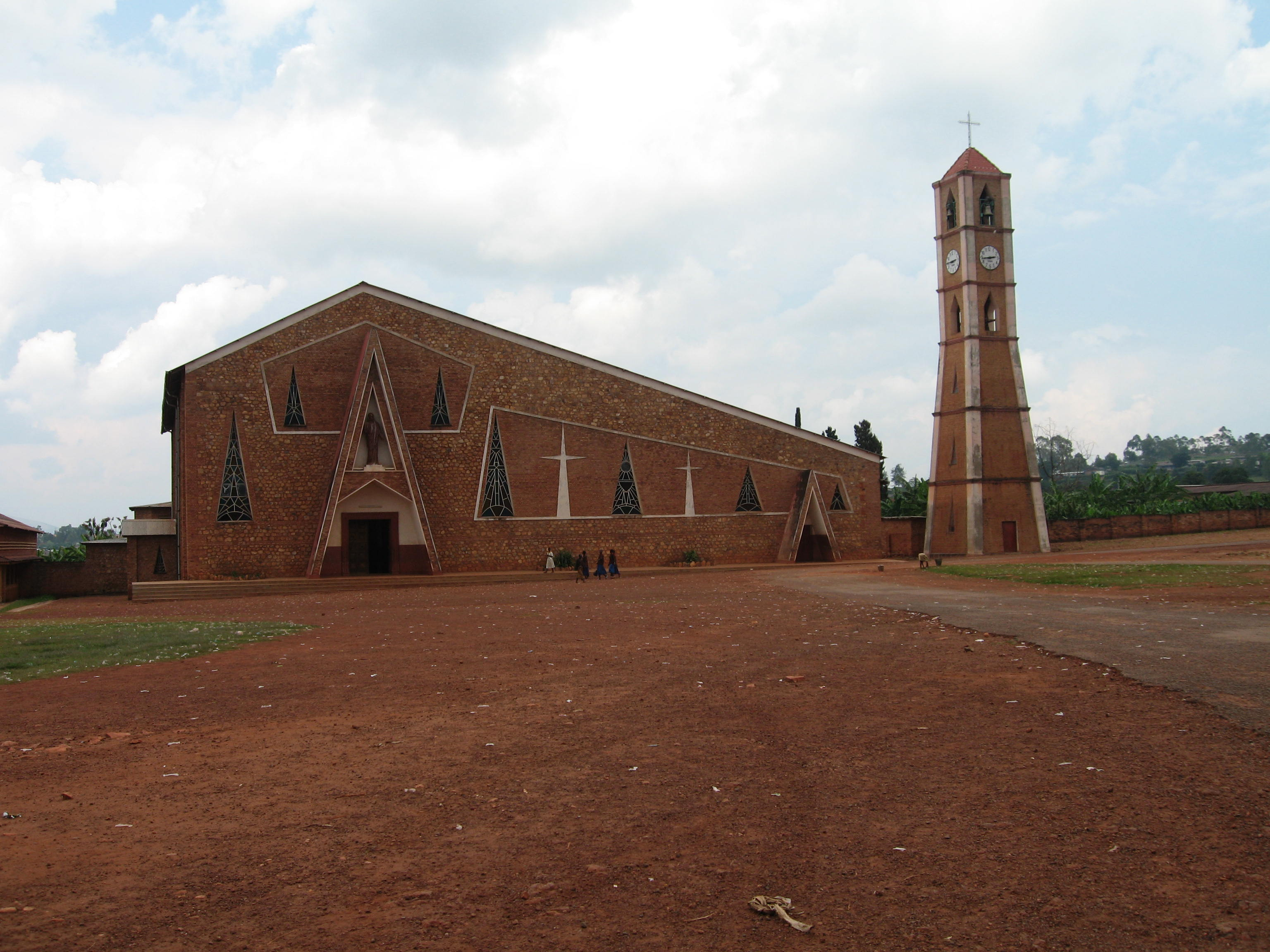
- Cathedral of Christ the King

Location
- Country: Burundi
- Ecclesiastical province: Ecclesiastical province of Gitega, Burundi
- Metropolitan: Gitega

Statistics
- Population: Total; Catholics: (as of 2019); 2,050,000; 1,560,000 (76,1%)

Information
- Denomination: Roman Catholic
- Rite: Roman Rite
- Cathedral: Cathedral of Christ the King

Current leadership
- Pope: Leo XIV
- Archbishop: Simon Ntamwana

Website
- archidiocese-gitega.org

The Archdiocese of Gitega the Metropolitan See for the ecclesiastical province of Gitega in Burundi.

== History ==
- 12 December 1912: Apostolic Vicariate of Kivu formed from parts of the Apostolic Vicariate of Unyanyembe and the Apostolic Vicariate of Southern Victoria Nyanza.
- 1921: Apostolic Vicariate of Kivu renamed the Apostolic Vicariate of Urundi and Kivu
- 25 April 1922: Apostolic Vicariate of Urundi and Kivu divided into the Apostolic Vicariate of Urundi and the Apostolic Vicariate of Ruanda.
- 14 July 1949: Apostolic Vicariate of Urundi renamed the Apostolic Vicariate of Kitega
- 10 November 1959: Apostolic Vicariate of Kitega promoted as Metropolitan Archdiocese of Gitega

== Bishops ==
=== Ordinaries, in reverse chronological order ===
- Metropolitan Archbishops of Gitega (Roman rite), below
  - Archbishop Simon Ntamwana – since 24 January 1997
  - Archbishop Joachim Ruhuna (6 November 1982 – 9 September 1996)
  - Archbishop André Makarakiza, M. Afr. (5 September 1968 – 6 November 1982)
  - Archbishop Antoine Grauls, M. Afr. (10 November 1959 – 16 October 1967); see below
- Vicar Apostolic of Kitega (Roman rite)
  - Bishop Antoine Grauls, M. Afr. (14 July 1949 – 10 November 1959); see above & below
- Vicars Apostolic of Urundi (Roman rite)
  - Bishop Antoine Grauls, M. Afr. (23 December 1936 – 14 July 1949); see above
  - Bishop Julien-Louis-Edouard-Marie Gorju, M. Afr. (26 April 1922 – 29 May 1936)

=== Coadjutor archbishop ===
- Joachim Ruhuna (1980-1982)

=== Auxiliary bishops ===
- Gabriel Kihimbare (1964), never consecrated
- Nestor Bihonda (1965-1968), appointed Bishop of Muyinga

=== Other priests of this diocese who became bishops ===
- Bonaventure Nahimana, appointed Bishop of Rutana in 2009
- Blaise Nzeyimana, appointed Bishop of Ruyigi in 2010

== Suffragan dioceses ==
- Diocese of Muyinga
- Diocese of Ngozi
- Diocese of Rutana
- Diocese of Ruyigi
