= Catholic Church in Burundi =

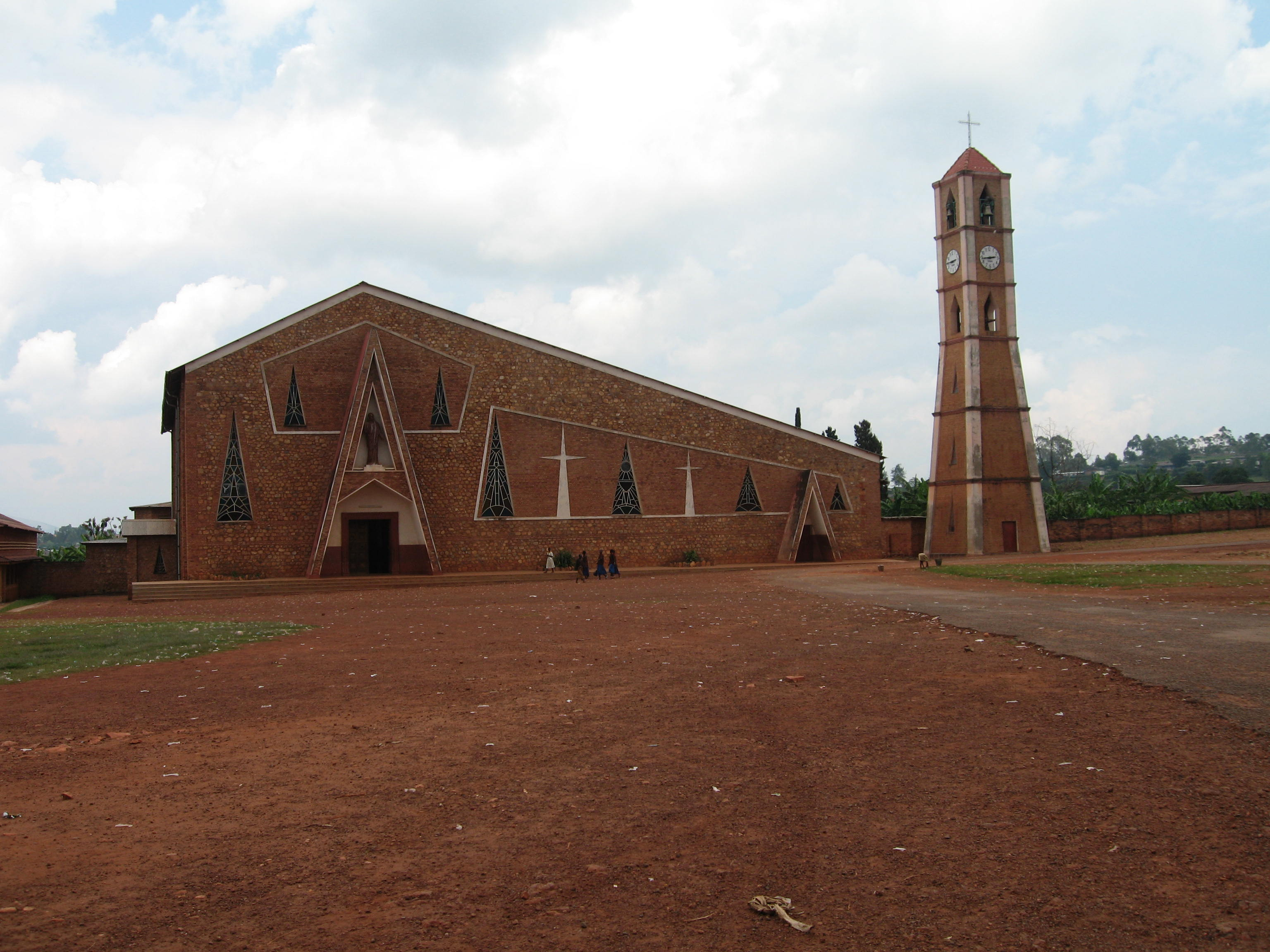
Gitega cathedral

The Catholic Church in Burundi is part of the worldwide Catholic Church, under the spiritual leadership of the Pope in Rome.

There are about four million Catholics in Burundi—around two-thirds of the total population. There are seven dioceses, including two archdioceses.

- Archdiocese of Bujumbura
  - Diocese of Bubanza
  - Diocese of Bururi
- Archdiocese of Gitega
  - Diocese of Muyinga
  - Diocese of Ngozi
  - Diocese of Rutana
  - Diocese of Ruyigi

== History ==
Main source: and Air University

=== Early Failed Attempts ===
The first attempt to spread Catholicism to the Burundians was at Rumonge on July 30, 1879, and lasted until May 4, 1881, when the two White Fathers, Deniaud and Promaux, were killed by the Burundians. More White Fathers returned in 1884, but this time to Bujumbura. Once again they had to leave due to the violence instigated by Arab slave traders. A third attempt near Buzige in 1891 was also thwarted by the slave traders. In a fourth attempt in 1896, Fathers Van Der Burght and Van Der Bresen were only able to stay six weeks and then had to flee. However, they returned to Burundi near Buzige in November 1896. A few years later, in January 1898, Father Van Der Bresen died from a fever, and that same day the mission station was burned to the ground by a violent storm. Subsequently, Father Van Der Burght left the following month.

=== Early Missions ===
The first permanent mission in Burundi was established on May 5, 1898, at Mugera. Muyaga was burned down twice by a chief who considered the Fathers to be enemies, once on the 14th of August 1898, and another the 18th of March 1899. Nevertheless, it was rebuilt again in May 1899. Another separate mission was established at Mugera in February 1899. A man by the name Mwami Mwezi IV Gisabo tried to run them off his property by the use of charms and supernatural threats, but he was told by another sorcerer that he should stop because Imana would protect them. Missions continued to pop up in places such as Buhonga in 1902, Kanyinya 1904, Rugari 1909, and Buhoro 1912. All of these missions started during the German colonial rule from 1896 to 1916.

=== Belgium Colonial Rule ===
When Belgium took over colonial rule from the Germans in 1916, more emphasis was placed on aiding the Catholic agenda. In the time period between 1916 and 1962, the year of Burundi's independence, Catholicism grew from 5,759 members to 1,517,817. Much of the health and education work was done through the Catholic Church. The Catholic Church was financed and supported exclusively through the Belgium colonial power until 1946, then the Protestant Church was able to garner some support, but was not nearly as prominent or important to them as the Catholic Church.

==== Ethnic groups ====
During the colonial period, the Catholic Church did not promote ethnic divisions, but the Belgiums and Germans primarily favored the Tutsi when it came to mission services. The Rwandan Catholic Church to the north of Burundi, was also in favor of the Tutsi during the colonial period, but again the Catholic Church in Burundi remained largely unbiased. By the 1930s, Tutsi chiefs started converting to the Catholic faith like wildfire, and the Hutu were growing in numbers also.

Today, the Catholics in Burundi either are Tutsi, Hutu or Twa, and live in communities throughout the country.

=== After Independence ===
Despite having a previously large number of Tutsi chiefs convert to Catholicism, it was unable to convert the Tutsi King Mwambutsa. During the 1970s and 1980s, the Catholic church supported the Hutus, and as a result, the government revoked some of the privileges and powers which they had previously enjoyed, for example; "religious gatherings were prohibited without prior approval, the Church’s youth movement was banned, Catholic schools were nationalized, and the Catholic radio station and newspaper were closed".

In 1987, all of this changed when power flipped into the hands of a Catholic as the result of a military coup, and Catholics were able to enjoy their previous freedoms.

The horrors of the Rwandan genocide left a stain on the Catholic Church as a whole, and even though the Burundi Catholic Church did not participate in the genocide, the Tutsis accused it of being a hindrance to their goals and the Hutus claimed that the Church was not doing enough to counter the discrimination which the Tutsis were practicing against them.

== Society ==
Main Source: U.S. Department of State

=== Politics ===
At the beginning, close ties existed between the Catholic Church and the Belgium government, but there were complaints from the Catholics that the government was too secular and could do more, nevertheless, they were pleased to have the Belgiums in power rather than the Germans.

Because the Catholic Church has such a powerful role within the country, during stressful political times has acted either as a balancer or an instigator to mounting tensions. A recent example in 2015 is when the then President, Pierre Nkurunziza, agreed to do a third term, when the constitution clearly stated only two terms were allowed. The Catholic Church did not shy away in reminding the President this, but he came back naming them "sponsors of terrorism". However, following this slander the Church continued to press for peace and solving the conflict without bloodshed.

In 2018, the Regulation and Conciliation of Religious Confessions was established as a sort of safety measure to make sure religious organizations complied with laws. In 2020 however, the Catholic Church chose to resign from partaking in the membership, and instead met with the government for a separate agreement.

President Evariste Ndayismimiye, who is a Catholic, reached out to the Catholic Bishops in July 2020 to ask for support in government projects. While Burundi is formally a secular state, in practice a lot of things are influenced and overseen by the Catholic Church. For example, embassy officials regularly meet with Catholic religious leaders in order to discuss improving religious freedom in the country.

In April 2024, the Bishops of Burundi issued a statement denouning the climate of violence in the country, claiming that "forced disappearances and politically motivated murders make one shudder".

“The realisation that there are people in our country who are cruelly murdered or abducted and disappear for political reasons or other macabre interests makes one shudder,” they wrote. “If a person is arrested by the competent authorities, justice must be administered in accordance with the law; the person must be held in a place that is known and accessible to family members.”

The bishops also denounced impunity and called on those responsible for the violence to "sheathe their swords again and set about building the nation by adopting ways that respect the dignity of human beings and favour dialogue and consultation".

=== Education ===
The education was from the early onset, run by the Catholic Church, and it was expected during that beginning time that if a child went to school he would need to become Catholic. Also, boys were generally the only ones attending school during the initial days of the Catholic Church in Burundi. In turn, the Protestant Church started their own schools.

Now, the official curriculum includes religion and morality classes, of which students can choose from. The religion classes are either taught with Catholic instruction, Protestant, or from Islam, and if they decide none of the above, morality classes are a substitute.

=== Healthcare ===
The Catholic Church has typically discouraged the use of other indigenous medicines from healers. Caritas Burundi is an organization founded by the Conference of Catholic Bishops of Burundi on May 20, 1962. It has been significant in the fight against Malaria by distributing insecticide-treated mosquito nets, and has also helped deal with the effects of AIDS. Another Catholic sponsored organization that has helped in the medical aspect as well as education, is Centre d'Entraide et de Developpement.

=== Public Morality ===
During the early period of the Catholic Church, Catholics allowed people to drink beer and fermented juice such as banana juice or durra juice, whereas the Protestants did not. Furthermore, if someone was baptized they were expected to attend services and confessions, if that person refused to pay their dues to the church or did not partake in confessions and sacraments, then their children would not be baptized. In addition, if a man took a second wife or divorced his wife, he was considered removed from the Church.

== Statistics ==
In 1915, the number of baptized Catholics were 5,769. According to estimates done in 2019 by the U.S. Department of State, the population in Burundi stands roughly at about 12.2 million, of which 62% identify as Catholic.

== Catholic lay organizations ==
- Xaveri Burundi

== See also ==
- Conference of Catholic Bishops of Burundi

== Sources ==
- GCatholic.org
- Catholic Hierarchy
