= Joseph Bamina =

Burundian politician

6th Prime Minister of Burundi
- In office 24 January 1965 – 30 September 1965
- Monarch: Mwambutsa IV
- Preceded by: Pié Masumbuko
- Succeeded by: Léopold Biha

Personal details
- Born: 15 March 1927 Busangana, Ruanda-Urundi
- Died: 15 December 1965 (aged 38) Muramvya Province, Kingdom of Burundi
- Party: Union for National Progress
- Spouse: Mary Roache

Joseph Bamina (15 March 1927 – 15 December 1965) was a politician serving as President of the Senate of Burundi when he was assassinated. He had been prime minister for less than a year, member of the Union for National Progress (French: Union pour le Progrès national—UPRONA) party. He and other Burundian leaders of the government were assassinated on 15 December 1965, by Tutsi soldiers during a reprisal effort to stop a coup by Hutu officers.

== Early life ==
Joseph Bamina was born on 15 March 1927 in Busangana, Urundi to a prominent Hutu family. After eight years of schooling at the Mugera Seminary, he enrolled at Lovanium University in the Belgian Congo, studying there from 1945 to 1950. He subsequently worked as a territorial agent for the Belgian colonial administration in Muhinga Province from 1950 to 1954. He married a Tutsi woman, Mary Roache, and had three children with her.

== Political career ==
In 1954 Bamina moved to Gitega. Close to the Urundian monarchy due to his high-status Hutu background, he began working for Mwami Mwambutsa IV. He also joined the Union for National Progress (UPRONA) party and served as an advisor to its leader, Prince Louis Rwagasore. He attended the Belgo-Congolese Round Table Conference in Brussels as an observer in 1960.

In January 1961 the Belgian administration appointed a provisional government for Burundi led by Prime Minister Joseph Cimpaye. On 6 July its composition was modified and Bamina was made Secretary of State for Finance. Burundi hosted legislative elections on 18 September. With approximately 80% voter turnout, UPRONA won 58 of 64 seats in the Legislative Assembly. Bamina contested a seat as an UPRONA candidate and won. Rwagasore was declared prime minister designate. He formed a new government, retaining Bamina as Secretary of State for Finance, but was assassinated on 13 October. Bamina later resigned from his government positions to serve as chief of staff for Mwambutsa.

Following Rwagasore's death, André Muhirwa became Prime Minister of Burundi, and Bamina strongly supported his government. Despite this, conflict embroiled UPRONA over who would assume the party leadership, with Muhirwa seeking it with the support of a Tutsi faction (though he was a Ganwa) and Paul Mirerekano aiming to secure it with the backing of a Hutu faction. Muhirwa's group would be dubbed the Casablanca faction, while Mirerekano's group would become known as the Monrovia faction. In an attempt to break the deadlock, Mwambutsa decreed that the next party leader would be elected by regular UPRONA members. Bamina was elected party president on 14 September with the support of the Mwami and Muhirwa, as a compromise candidate. Though Mirerekano was made a vice president, he refused to recognise the legitimacy of the new national party committee and began leading a separate wing of the organisation. Bamina initially held the UPRONA presidency alongside his position as the Mwami's chief of staff, until Mwambutsa decided the two roles were incompatible and force him to leave the second office. He later sought election to the office of President of the National Assembly in May 1963, but lost by two votes. A conference was held in Gitega in September 1964 in an attempt to resolve UPRONA's divisions and resulted in Bamina retaining the party presidency, though UPRONA remained fractured and de facto leaderless.

The Monrovia faction recognized the People's Republic of China in 1964, contrary to the desires of the Mwami. In January 1965, the Mwami tapped Pierre Ngendandumwe, a Hutu, to form a new government as prime minister, in part because of his stance against Chinese and communist influence in the country. Surprised by this development, the Casablanca leaders conspired with Rwandan refugees and assassinated Ngendandumwe a few days later. The government arrested several Rwandans as well as leading figures of the Casablanca group, but none were ever convicted for the murder. On 24 January Bamina was made Prime Minister as a compromise between the Casablanca and Monrovia factions. He would hold that position until 30 September 1965. In an attempt to move past the political acrimony, the Mwami dissolved the National Assembly and called for new elections. Bamina met with his ministers for the first time on 26 January to commemorate Ngendandumwe and decide upon a new policy for his government. As prime minister, Bamina cut off relations with communist China on 30 January and ordered the Chinese diplomatic staff out of the country, with government troops surrounding the Chinese embassy.

Bamina's government was dismissed on 30 March so that its members could participate in the elections. In the May 1965 contests, 23 of the 33 seats in the Assembly were won by Hutus, and 10 of these were won by politicians from the Hutu-interest aligned Party of the People (PP). UPRONA won a majority 21 seats, but by then the party had lost cohesion and was overtaken by factionalism, with a cross-party Hutu caucus growing in strength. Bamina was elected to the newly-established Senate. He was elected President of the Senate on 4 September.

=== Attempted coup and death ===
After the Mwami overruled the senate's selection of a Hutu as prime minister and instead appointed a Tutsi Hutu officers in the army staged a coup attempt on 18 October, attacking the Mwami's palace and wounding the prime minister before being defeated. Martial law was declared and the army and police began arresting suspected dissidents, including Bamina. He was executed on 15 December 1965 in Muramvya Province.

== Works cited ==
- Année Africaine 1965 (in French). Paris: Éditions A. Pedone. 1967. OCLC 929702844.
- Eyoh, Dickson; Zeleza, Paul Tiyambe (2002). Encyclopaedia of Twentieth-Century African History (reprint ed.). Taylor & Francis. ISBN 9780415234795.
- Lemarchand, René (1970). Rwanda and Burundi. New York: Praeger Publishers. OCLC 254366212.
- Russell, Aiden (2019). Politics and Violence in Burundi: The Language of Truth in an Emerging State. Cambridge: Cambridge University Press. ISBN 978-1-108-49934-7.
- Weinstein, Warren (1976). Historical Dictionary of Burundi. Metuchen: Scarecrow Press. ISBN 978-0-8108-0962-8.

Political offices
Preceded by Pié Masumbuko	Prime Minister of Burundi; 1965	Succeeded by Léopold Biha
