= Joseph Biroli =

Burundian politician (1929–1963)

Portrait of Biroli

Joseph Biroli-Baranyanka or Joseph Biroli (28 May 1929 – 15 January 1963) was a Burundian politician and was the first Burundian to receive a university education. Born in 1929 to a prominent chief, he was a Ganwa of the Batare clan. He performed well as a student and earned a diploma from the Institut universitaire des Territoires d'Outre-Mer in 1953. After continuing his education at several other universities he took up work for the European Economic Community. In 1960 his brother Jean-Baptiste Ntidendereza co-founded the Christian Democratic Party (Parti Démocratique Chrétien, PDC), and Biroli became the party's president. His main political rival was Prince Louis Rwagasore, a Ganwa of the Bezi clan who led the Union for National Progress (Union pour le Progres National, UPRONA). Biroli was friendly to the Belgian colonial administration in Ruanda-Urundi, while UPRONA demanded immediate independence.

In May 1961 Ntidendereza replaced Brioli as PDC president, and the latter became head of the party's public relations. Burundi hosted legislative elections in September in 1961, which were handily won by UPRONA. In October Rwagasore was murdered, and the subsequent investigation implicated Biroli and Ntidendereza. Biroli was found guilty and initially sentenced to life in prison, but in a retrial he was sentenced to death and was executed alongside his brother and other co-conspirators in 1963.

== Early life ==
Joseph Biroli-Baranyanka was born on 28 May 1929. Ethnically, he was Ganwa of the Batare clan, and was a son of Pierre Baranyanka, a paramount chief with close relations to the Belgian colonial administration in Ruanda-Urundi. He attended primary school in Kayanza before enrolling at the Groupe Scolaire d'Astrida. In 1949 he was admitted to the Institut universitaire des Territoires d'Outre-Mer in Antwerp. He performed well as a student and graduated in July 1953 with a diploma in colonial and political sciences. He then secured a degree in economics at the Catholic University of Leuven in September 1956 before working as a scholar at St Antony's College, Oxford, from 1957 to 1958 and participating in an international seminar at Harvard University in 1957. This made him the first Burundian to receive a university education. He then worked for the European Economic Community. In 1958 he joined a Brussels-based interracial working group, the Groupe Marzorati, to study modern problems in Africa. He served as its vice-chairman and was responsible for a seminar on social and cultural affairs.

== Political career ==
Biroli supported a political union between Ruanda and Urundi. In 1960 his brother Jean-Baptiste Ntidendereza co-founded the Christian Democratic Party (Parti Démocratique Chrétien, PDC). Biroli subsequently became the party's president. The PDC's main rival was the Union for National Progress (Union pour le Progres National, UPRONA) led by Prince Louis Rwagasore, a Ganwa of the Bezi clan. Biroli and Rwagasore publicly held significant dislike for one another. Biroli had garnered a reputation in European social circles as more sophisticated and urbane than the prince, and was held in higher regard by the Belgian administration. The PDC, unlike UPRONA, rejected calls for immediate independence and instead focused its platform on socioeconomic reform. Despite ideological differences, the rivalries between the two parties were primarily fueled by the intra-nobility conflicts, as the Bezi and Batare lineages backed UPRONA and PDC respectively. The two lineages had long struggled for control of the country. One of Biroli's other brothers, Charles Baranyanka, joined UPRONA and became a diplomat. As civil order broke down and the Congo fell into crisis, Biroli released a joint communique with Rwagasore on 15 July, appealing for calm and racial harmony, saying Burundi had "the unique chance [...] to create in the heart of Africa an island of peace, tranquility and prosperity." His decision to sign the communique with Rwagasore shocked colonial administration officials.

As PDC president, in September 1960 Biroli led the Burundian delegation to a conference held in Brussels to discuss the decolonisation of Urundi and the organisation of elections. In November Urundi hosted communal elections. Rwagasore was placed under house arrest, hampering UPRONA's campaign, and the PDC emerged as the victor, winning 942 of 2,876 local offices. In December Biroli went to New York to address the United Nations General Assembly. Upon his return he announced his dissatisfaction with the attitudes of the Afro-Asian countries, feeling they were too hostile towards Belgium. Following ethnic violence in Ruanda, the UN General Assembly recommended the postponement of general elections in Urundi. Biroli attended a conference in Ostend in January 1961 and joined the other Burundian delegates in opposing this move, though Belgium acceded to the UN's wishes. In May Ntidendereza replaced Brioli as PDC president, and the latter became head of the party's public relations.

For the 1961 legislative elections, UPRONA concentrated its entire election campaign on Rwagasore, using his charisma to rally substantial support. The PDC had assumed a certain victory due to its success during the November 1960 communal elections and began its election campaign late. To oppose UPRONA it formed a cartel with other parties, termed the Common Front (Front Commun). The elections were held on 18 September 1961. With approximately 80% voter turnout, UPRONA won 58 of 64 seats in the Legislative Assembly, and Rwagasore was declared prime minister designate.

== Death ==
On 13 October 1961 Rwagasore was assassinated by a Greek national, Ioannis Kageorgis. Within three days the police had arrested Kageorgis and three Burundian accomplices: Antoine Nahimana, Henri Ntakiyica, and Jean-Baptiste Ntakiyica. The latter three were all members of the PDC. The group quickly admitted responsibility for the murder and incriminated three other persons in their plot: Michel Iatrou, Ntidendereza, and Biroli. Kageorgis told the police that Ntidendereza and Biroli asked him to shoot the prime minister, and that Biroli assured had him that there would only be a minimal investigation into the affair. Some accounts reported that Biroli had sexual relations with Iatrou and Kageorgis. The investigators concluded that Ntidendereza and Biroli planned the assassination. Iatrou denied this, while Ntidendereza initially implicated himself in the conspiracy before later recanting his testimony. Biroli admitted to attending a meeting with the other two where "it was decided to kill Rwagasore".

For his role in the plot, Biroli was initially sentenced to life in prison. On 30 June 1962, one day before Burundi's independence, Kageorgis was executed. Biroli wrote several letters from prison complaining of the miscarriage of justice and alleging torture. Following independence Burundi established a Supreme Court with retroactive competence, and on 27 October it ruled the previous trials to have violated the right to judgement by a jury established by the new constitution and ordered a retrial. On 27 November the lower court found Ntidendereza, Biroli, Nahimana, Iatrou, and Ntakiyica guilty and sentenced them to death. Officials at St Antony's College attempted to dispatch a lawyer to Burundi and petition Biroli's case to the United Nations Commission on Human Rights, but were unable to intervene in time. The defendants' final appeal to the Supreme Court was denied, as were the attempts of the Belgian government to convince Mwami Mwambutsa IV to offer clemency, and on 15 January 1963 all five were publicly hanged in the Gitega stadium before thousands of people. With the PDC's loss in the legislative elections and the execution of Ntidendereza and Biroli, the party ceased to be a viable political force. Biroli and his brother were buried in the Mushasha cemetery in Gitega.

== Works cited ==
- De Witte, Ludo (2021). Meurtre Au Burundi : La Belgique et l'assassinat de Rwagasore (in French). Editions IWACU, Investig' Action. ISBN 978-2-930827-87-2.
- Lemarchand, René (1970). Rwanda and Burundi. New York: Praeger Publishers. OCLC 254366212.
- McDonald, Gordon C., ed. (1969). Area Handbook for Burundi (PDF). Washington, D.C.: U.S. Government Printing Office. OCLC 953395348. Archived (PDF) from the original on July 27, 2021.
- Nicholls, C. (2000). The History of St Antony's College, Oxford, 1950–2000. Basingstoke: Palgrave Macmillan. ISBN 9780230598836.
- Philipp, Günther (1978). "Burundi". In Franz Nuscheler; Klaus Ziemer (eds.). Die Wahl der Parlamente und anderer Staatsorgane. Band 2: Afrika (in German). Berlin: Walter de Gruyter. pp. 567–604. ISBN 978-3-11-004518-5.
- Poppe, Guy (2015). "The murder of Burundi's prime minister, Louis Rwagasore". Afrika Focus. 28 (2): 156–164. doi:10.1163/2031356X-02802011.
- Russell, Aidan (2019). Politics and Violence in Burundi: The Language of Truth in an Emerging State. Cambridge University Press. ISBN 978-1-108-49934-7.
- Weinstein, Warren (1976). Historical Dictionary of Burundi. Metuchen: Scarecrow Press. ISBN 978-0-8108-0962-8.
