= Kamenge incidents =

Violent incidents and riots in Burundi

The Kamenge incidents (French: incidents à Kamenge) or Kamenge riots were a series of armed raids and murders conducted in the Kamenge quarter of Bujumbura, Burundi in January 1962. They were perpetrated by militants of the Jeunesse Nationaliste Rwagasore against Hutu leaders of the Syndicats Chrétiens trade union and the Parti du Peuple. The Kamenge incidents were the first major instance of ethnic violence in modern Burundi.

== Background ==
=== Political situation in Burundi ===
In the 20th century Burundi had three main indigenous ethnic groups: Hutu, Tutsi, and Twa. The area was colonised by the German Empire in the late 1800s and administered as a portion of German East Africa. In Burundi and neighboring Rwanda to the north, the Germans maintained indirect rule, leaving local social structures intact. Under this system, the Tutsi minority generally enjoyed its historically high status as aristocrats, whereas the Hutus occupied the bottom of the social structure. Princely and monarchal rulers belonged to a unique ethnic group, Ganwa, though over time the political salience of this distinction declined and the category was subsumed by the Tutsi grouping. During World War I, Belgian troops from the Belgian Congo occupied Burundi and Rwanda. In 1919, under the auspices of the nascent League of Nations, Belgium was given the responsibility of administering "Ruanda-Urundi" as a mandated territory. Though obligated to promote social progress in the territory, the Belgians did not alter the local power structures. Following World War II, the United Nations was formed and Ruanda-Urundi became a trust territory under Belgian administration, which required the Belgians to politically educate the locals and prepare them for independence.

The Belgian administration introduced political reforms in Burundi in the late 1950s. In 1958 Prince Louis Rwagasore became heavily involved with the Union pour le Progres National (UPRONA). Rwagasore sought to transform UPRONA into a mass party with broad-base appeal across different regions, ethnicities, and castes. Wary of the growing Hutu-Tutsi conflict in Rwanda, he sought to counteract tensions by bringing members of both groups into UPRONA's leadership. Formal party positions at both the national and local levels were usually evenly divided between Hutus and Tutsis, though the latter tended to occupy the most important offices. UPRONA's internal rules set devolved responsibilities to the central committee, but in practice the party operated at the whim of Rwagasore; it retained relatively weak organisational capability and was held together by his charismatic leadership.

In the September 1961 elections UPRONA won an overwhelming majority of the seats in the Legislative Assembly, and Rwagasore was asked to form a government. On 13 October 1961 Rwagasore was assassinated in a plot conceived by members of an opposition party. His death stoked divisions in UPRONA, and fueled a rivalry between Paul Mirerekano, a Hutu, and the new Ganwa prime minister, André Muhirwa. Both claimed to be the heirs to the late prime minister's legacy and both sought to become president of UPRONA in his wake. Muhirwa initially claimed the presidency, arguing that since he had taken over Rwagasore's place in government he was entitled to lead the party. Mirerekano contested this on the grounds that Rwagasore had made him interim party president in mid-1961. The leadership dispute eventually led to the coalescing of two factions in the party, with Muhirwa leading the "Casablanca group" and Mirekano leading the "Monrovia group". The former, associated with Tutsis, was generally anti-West in its political orientation, while the latter, associated with Hutus, took a more moderate stance on the West.

=== Syndicats Chrétiens and the Jeunesse Nationaliste Rwagasore ===
Despite Mirerekano's distancing from UPRONA's leaders at this stage, most Hutus remained supportive of the party. Hutu political consciousness remained confined to the Parti du Peuple (PP), a small republican group that had gained very little traction in the 1961 elections. Many Burundian Hutu leaders joined the Syndicats Chrétiens, a trade union founded in 1958 as a subsidiary of the Belgium-based Confederation of Christian Trade Unions. Though nominally apolitical, the union became a hotbed of Hutu political activity. Though this group of Hutu republican intellectuals was confined to Bujumbura, Tutsi leaders in UPRONA were deeply suspicious of it.

Tutsi university students Prime Niyongabo and Gilles Bimazubute founded the Union Culturelle de la Jeunesse Africaine du Burundi (UCJAB), in 1959. It was conceived as a progressive nationalist group for youth, but had no partisan attachments. Following the 1961 legislative elections, it aligned itself with UPRONA and was renamed the Jeunesse Nationaliste Rwagasore (JNR). By then, patronage and influence had already been awarded to other UPRONA members, and the JNR leaders became a disgruntled counter-elite. In the months preceding independence, the Burundian government attempted to co-opt the JNR by designating it a "parallel structure" responsible for policing the native sections of Bujumbura. JNR militants enthusiastically performed this task, though the government and UPRONA never fully secured control over the movement. It evolved into a militant Tutsi chauvinist group.

== Events ==
In early January 1962, the Syndicats Chrétiens hosted a congress at the Collège du Saint-Esprit in Bujumbura. At its conclusion the organisation released a communique which condemned the "provocations and revanchist attitude of the JNR. The document further accused the JNR of "propagating hatred and aggression" and stated that the union would "initiate a policy of self-defence" and lead strikes unless the Belgian or Burundian governments intervened to temper the youth movement and ensure peace.

On 13 January, JNR militant Pamphile Bikoboke, falsely claiming to be a court official appointed by the burgomaster of Bujumbura, used forged warrants to arrest two Hutu leaders in the commune of Muzazi, Bubanza Province. The following day, Niyongabo held a meeting with JNR members at the Centre Educatif et Social in the Kamenge neighborhood of Bujumbura. JNR militants then conducted a series of armed raids targeting Hutus associated with the Syndicats Chrétiens and the PP. They set four homes ablaze in Kamenge and stoned Syndicats Chrétiens president and PP national secretary Jean Nduwabike to death. Syndicats Chrétiens permanent secretary and national secretary of the Association of Burundi Teachers Severin Ndinzurwaha, PP member and school principal Basile Ntawumenyakarizi, and a man known only as Baruvura were also murdered.

== Aftermath ==
=== Political effects ===
The Kamenge incidents were the first major instance of ethnic violence in modern Burundi. Hutu leaders in UPRONA were shocked by the violence. Members of the incipient Monrovia faction feared that the violence was the result of growing Tutsi supremacist sentiments. Racial divisions in UPRONA quickly heightened in the incidents' aftermath. Mirerekano became increasingly suspicious of Muhirwa and his government, as some of its members maintained informal links with the JNR. In June, Hutu deputies in the National Assembly accused Minister of Interior Jean Ntiruhama of collaborating with JNR leaders during the riots, spawning over 30 other accusations of impropriety including favouritism in appointments and incitements to ethnic hatred. By the end of the year, the Monrovia and Casablanca factions had solidified in the Assembly. After Ntiruhama attempted to have Mirerekano arrested for continuing the UPRONA leadership dispute, Mwami Mwambutsa IV arranged for him to be removed from the government. Hutu deputies also questioned the actions of Governor of Bujumbura Ildephonse Ntamikevyo and the conclusions of the public prosecutor's office in its proceedings against JNR members implicated in the riots.

=== Criminal proceedings ===
For his role in the incidents, Niyongabo was sentenced by the Belgian Trusteeship Courts to 18 months' incarceration, which he avoided by fleeing to Tanganyika. In 1963 Muhirwa was replaced by Burundi's first Hutu premier, Pierre Ngendandumwe. Ngendandumwe's government sought additional action against JNR members for the Kamenge incidents—Minister of Justice François Karisabiye requested a trial for those involved—generating protests from Tutsi students. Niyongabo was subsequently resentenced to 20 years in prison in late 1963. The following year Ngendandumwe was replaced by Albin Nyamoya. Nyamoya's government suspended all criminal proceedings related to the Kamenege incidents and Minister of Justice Pierre Ngunzu voided the sentence against Niyongabo, his brother-in-law. Dissatisfaction in the Assembly with the government's handling of the affair partly motivated the tabling of a motion of censure against it in 1964.

== Works cited ==
- Eggers, Ellen K. (2006). Historical Dictionary of Burundi (third ed.). Lanham: Scarecrow Press. ISBN 978-0-8108-5302-7.
- Lemarchand, René (1970). Rwanda and Burundi. New York: Praeger Publishers. OCLC 254366212.
- Lemarchand, René (2013). "Burundi 1972: A Forgotten Genocide". Forgotten Genocides : Oblivion, Denial, and Memory. Philadelphia: University of Pennsylvania Press. ISBN 978-0-8122-4335-2.
- Melady, Thomas (1974). Burundi: The Tragic Years. New York: Orbis Books. ISBN 0-88344-045-8.
- Russell, Aidan (2019). Politics and Violence in Burundi: The Language of Truth in an Emerging State. Cambridge: Cambridge University Press. ISBN 978-1-108-49934-7.
- Turner, Simon (2012). Politics of Innocence: Hutu Identity, Conflict and Camp Life. New York: Berghahn Books. ISBN 9780857456090.
- Weinstein, Warren (1976). Historical Dictionary of Burundi. Metuchen: Scarecrow Press. ISBN 978-0-8108-0962-8.
