= André Muhirwa =

Prime Minister of Burundi (1920–2003)

3rd Prime Minister of Burundi
- In office 19 October 1961 – 7 June 1963
- Monarch: Mwambutsa IV
- Preceded by: Louis Rwagasore
- Succeeded by: Pierre Ngendandumwe

Minister of the Interior
- In office September 1961 – October 1961
- Preceded by: Jean-Baptiste Ntidendereza
- Succeeded by: Jean Ntiruhama

Personal details
- Born: 1920 Murete, Ruanda-Urundi
- Died: 28 April 2003 (aged 83)
- Party: UPRONA
- Spouse: Rose Paula Iribagiza
- Parent: Mbanzabugabo (father)

André Muhirwa (1920 – 28 April 2003) was a Burundian politician who served as prime minister of Burundi from 1961 to 1963. He became prime minister following the assassination of his predecessor, Louis Rwagasore. A member of the Union for National Progress (UPRONA), he previously served as Minister of the Interior from September to October 1961.

== Early life ==
André Muhirwa was born in 1920 in Murete, Ruanda-Urundi. He was the son of Mbanzabugabo, a prominent chief. He belonged to the Batare lineage of the Ganwa ethnicity. Following the death of his father in 1930 and his protests over the former's appointed successor, the Belgian Residency forced him into exile with his brothers in Tanganyika. Muhirwa and his brothers returned to Burundi in late 1931. With the assistance of a Catholic priest, he studied at the Groupe Scolaire de Astrida, graduating in 1942. From then until 1944 he served as a clerk in the Bururi District Office.

== Political career ==
In 1944 Muhirwa was granted the small chiefdom of Buhumuza in the Ruyigi territory. The chiefdom was distant from his place of origin, and he later recounted in an interview that while presiding over it he felt as if he were still in exile. In 1952 he married Rosa Paula Iribagiza, the daughter of the Mwami (king) of Burundi, Mwambutsa IV of Burundi. The marriage was part of a deal struck by Muhirwa with the monarchy to assume his father's chiefdom, with the assistance of Chiefs Ntitendereza and Barusasiyeko. He was granted the chiefdom the following year. Afterwards he became a staunch supporter of Bezi lineage Ganwa and grew close to the monarchy. He retained good relations with the Mwami even after he separated from Iribagiza.

In 1958 Muhirwa became a supporter of Crown Prince Louis Rwagasore and later joined the Union for National Progress (Union pour le Progrès national, UPRONA)—Rwagosore's political party—becoming one of its vice-presidents by April 1960. In October 1960 he fled Urundi and went to Tanganyika, but returned in August 1961 to help Rwagosore prepare UPRONA for the 1961 elections. Following UPRONA's victory in September, Rwagosore appointed Muhirwa as Minister of the Interior in his government. On 13 October Rwagosore was assassinated, and Muhirwa was appointed Prime Minister of Burundi to replace him on 19 October. The Legislative Assembly gave him its confidence in a vote, 50 to two. Jean Ntiruhama replaced him as Minister of Interior. At the Legislative Assembly's session on 22 October Muhirwa, citing the distraction of "recent events", declined to offer a government program and the body sat aimlessly for the next few months. He accused the Belgian administration, namely Governor-General Jean-Paul Harroy, of being complicit in Rwagasore's murder, though he vacillated on this position, at points expressing concern over the future of Belgian-Burundian relations but also facing pressure from his government and the public to condemn the Belgians. He attended the public execution of Rwagasore's killers in January 1963.

The death of Rwagosore stoked divisions in UPRONA, and fueled a rivalry between Muhirwa and a Hutu politician, Paul Mirerekano. Both claimed to be the heirs to the late prime minister's legacy and both sought to become president of UPRONA in his wake. Muhirwa initially claimed the presidency, arguing that since he had taken over Rwagasore's place in government he was entitled to lead the party. Mirerekano contested this on the grounds that Rwagasore had made him interim party president in mid-1961. A caucus of several UPRONA leaders met on 4 July 1962 to settle the dispute and confirmed Muhirwa's ascension to the party presidency. Mirerekano refused to concede, and at the Mwami's intervention, an UPRONA mass congress was held in September, which led to both men being assigned vice presidencies in the party. The leadership dispute led to the coalescing of two factions in the party, with Muhirwa leading the "Casablanca group" and Mirekano leading the "Monrovia group". The former was generally anti-West in its political orientation, while the latter took a more moderate stance on the West.

"The Government of Urundi seeks independence, not just autonomy. It wants to be responsible and knows that it can be."

— Muhirwa to the United Nations Trusteeship Council, 13 June 1962

Muhirwa led a delegation to the United Nations headquarters in February 1962 to discuss the terms of Burundi's impending independence. He opposed the retention of Belgian troops in Urundi. He attended ceremonies to mark the independence of the Kingdom of Burundi on 1 July 1962, and subsequently submitted Burundi's request for membership to the United Nations. He also signed the promulgation order for the new Constitution of the Kingdom of Burundi alongside Mwambutsa and Minister of Justice Claver Nuwinkware.

During his tenure, Mwambutsa increasingly involved himself in national politics. In March 1963 Muhirwa ordered the arrest of three Monrovia leaders—including President of the Legislative Assembly Thaddée Siryuyumunsi—for allegedly conspiring against the government, but the Mwami intervened and ordered their release. The Legislative Assembly, in direct opposition to Muhirwa's government subsequently appointed Siryuyumunsi and two other opposition figures to the Mwami's Crown Council on 22 May. On 1 June, Muhirwa announced his appointment of a new Minister of Public Works. This prompted the Mwami to deny the selection, arguing that the crown was entitled to choose its ministers. On 7 June a motion of no confidence was tabled against his government in the Legislative Assembly for his previous imprisonment of its presiding officer. Faced with growing parliamentary opposition and the monarchy's interventions, Muhirwa gave Mwambutsa his resignation that day. The Mwami appointed Pierre Ngendandumwe as the new prime minister. Despite this, Muhirwa retained his position in UPRONA and remained influential in national politics as the leader of the Casablanca group. In 1964 he was made Minister of State in Prime Minister Albin Nyamoya's government.

In 1965, Muhirwa was co-opted into the Senate. Following the failure of a Hutu-led coup attempt later that year, he directed government retaliation against Hutu intellectuals. He was appointed Minister of State under Prime Minister Léopold Biha on 15 March 1966. He orchestrated the July coup that crowned Charles Ndizeye as Mwami Ntare V. Following Captain Michel Micombero's coup that November, he was arrested. He was later released and on 28 November 1967 appointed to a sinecure position with the Bujumbura port authority, serving on its board of directors. From 1975 to 1976 he served as Burundi's ambassador to Tanzania.

== Later life ==
While retiring upon his departure from the ambassadorship, Muhirwa remained engaged with politics in Burundi and became an advocate for the fully-fledged recognition of the Ganwa as a separate ethnicity from Burundi's other major ethnic groups. In 2001, he co-founded the Parliamentary Monarchist Party (Parti Monarchiste Parlementaire, PMP). He died on 28 April 2003 at the age of 83.

== Works cited ==
- Banshimiyubusa, Denis (2018). Les enjeux et défis de la démocratisation au Burundi. Essai d'analyse et d'interprétation à partir des partis politiques (PDF) (PhD thesis) (in French). Université Pau et des Pays de l'Adour. OCLC 1085890695.
- "Le Burundi a la Recherche d'Une Stabilite". Présence Africaine (in French) (47): 235–241. 1963. JSTOR 24348312.
- Carbone, Carlo (March 2000). "Nazione, Nazionalisti, Decolonizzazione in Burundi 1958-1963". Africa: Rivista trimestrale di studi e documentazione dell'Istituto italiano per l'Africa e l'Oriente (in Italian). 55 (1): 1–52. JSTOR 40761428.
- De Witte, Ludo (2021). Meurtre Au Burundi : La Belgique et l'assassinat de Rwagasore (in French). Editions IWACU, Investig' Action. ISBN 978-2-930827-87-2.
- Eggers, Ellen K. (2006). Historical Dictionary of Burundi (third ed.). Lanham: Scarecrow Press. ISBN 978-0-8108-5302-7.
- Ghislain, Jean (1970). La Féodalité au Burundi (PDF) (in French). Brussels: Académie royale des Sciences d’Outre-Mer. OCLC 2115033.
- Lemarchand, René (1970). Rwanda and Burundi. New York: Praeger Publishers. OCLC 254366212.
- McDonald, Gordon C., ed. (1969). Area Handbook for Burundi (PDF). Washington, D.C.: U.S. Government Printing Office. OCLC 953395348. Archived (PDF) from the original on July 27, 2021.
- Webster, John. B. (1964), The Constitutions of Burundi, Malagasy and Rwanda. A Comparison and Explanation of East African French Language Constitutions, Occasional Paper no. 3, Syracuse: Syracuse University, OCLC 846680671
- Weinstein, Warren (1976). Historical Dictionary of Burundi. Metuchen: Scarecrow Press. ISBN 9780810809628.

Political offices
| Preceded by Position created | Prime Minister of Burundi; 1961–1963 | Succeeded by Pierre Ngendandumwe |
