= Jean-Baptiste Ntidendereza =

Jean-Baptiste Ntidendereza (31 May 1926 – 15 January 1963) was a Burundian politician. A co-founder of the Christian Democratic Party, he served as Minister of Interior of Burundi in 1961. He was later convicted of conspiring to kill Louis Rwagasore, a political opponent, and publicly executed.

== Early life ==
Jean-Baptiste Ntidendereza was born on 31 May 1926 in Irabiro, Burundi. Ethnically, he was Ganwa of the Batare clan, and was a son of Pierre Baranyanka, a paramount chief with close relations to the Belgian colonial administration in Ruanda-Urundi. He was educated at the Groupe Scolaire d'Astrida, studying agriculture and administration.

== Career ==
After completing his studies, Ntidendereza was made chief of Mutabo in 1943. From 1944 to 1960 he served as the chief of Bwambarangwe. In 1950 he accompanied Mwami Mwambutsa IV on his first trip to Europe. In 1954 he was made a member of the Supreme Land Council (Conseil Supérieur du Pays, CSP), an advisory body presided over by the Mwami with some responsibility over budgetary and administrative affairs. The CSP later went defunct and was supplanted on 22 February 1960 by the Provisional Commission, a body designed to study issues left unsolved by the CSP and work out immediate problems before national elections were held. Ntidendereza was placed on the commission.

On 5 February 1960 Ntindereza co-founded the Christian Democratic Party (Parti Démocratique Chrétien, PDC). His brother, Joseph Biroli, subsequently became the party's president. The PDC's main rival was the Union for National Progress (Union pour le Progres National, UPRONA) led by Prince Louis Rwagasore, a Ganwa of the Bezi clan. The PDC, unlike UPRONA, rejected calls for immediate independence and instead focused its platform on socioeconomic reform. Despite ideological differences, the rivalries between the two parties were primarily fueled by the intra-nobility conflicts, as the Bezi and Batare lineages backed UPRONA and PDC respectively. The two lineages had long struggled for control of the country. One of Ntidendereza's other brothers, Charles Baranyanka, joined UPRONA and became a diplomat.

The Belgian administration channeled financial aid to Ntidendereza and the PDC, particularly on the initiative of Assistant Resident Pierre DeFay. In November 1960 Urundi hosted communal elections. Rwagasore was placed under house arrest, hampering UPRONA's campaign, and the PDC emerged as the victor, winning 942 of 2,876 local offices. Ntidendereza's and DeFay's relationship later deteriorated, as Ntidendereza sought to loosen his connections to the administration and act independently of its wishes. In May 1961 Ntidendereza replaced Brioli as PDC president. The administration created an interim government led by Prime Minister Joseph Cimpaye based on the communal election results to lead the country until elections for the national legislature were held. On 6 July the government was modified and Ntidendereza was made Minister of Interior.

For the 1961 legislative elections, UPRONA concentrated its entire election campaign on Rwagasore, using his charisma to rally substantial support. The PDC had assumed a certain victory due to its success during the November 1960 municipal elections and began its election campaign late. To oppose UPRONA it formed a cartel with other parties, termed the Common Front (Front Commun). The elections were held on 18 September 1961. With approximately 80% voter turnout, UPRONA won 58 of 64 seats in the Legislative Assembly, and Rwagasore was declared prime minister designate.

== Death ==
On 13 October 1961 Rwagasore was assassinated by a Greek national. Within three days the police had arrested the Greek, Ioannis Kageorgis, and three Burundian accomplices: Antoine Nahimana, Henri Ntakiyica, and Jean-Baptiste Ntakiyica. The latter three were all members of the PDC. The group quickly admitted responsibility for the murder and incriminated three other persons in their plot: Michel Iatrou, Ntidendereza, and Biroli. The investigators concluded that Ntidendereza and Biroli planned the assassination. Iatrou denied this, while Ntidendereza initially implicated himself in the conspiracy before later recanting his testimony.

On 30 June 1962, one day before Burundi's independence, Kageorgis was executed. Following independence Burundi established a Supreme Court with retroactive competence, and on 27 October it ruled the previous trials to have violated the right to judgement by a jury established by the new constitution and ordered a retrial. On 27 November the lower court found Ntidendereza, Biroli, Nahimana, Iatrou, and Ntakiyica guilty and sentenced them to death. The defendants' final appeal to the Supreme Court was denied, as were the attempts of the Belgian government to convince the Mwami to offer clemency, and on 15 January 1963 all five were publicly hanged in Gitega stadium before thousands of people. With the PDC's loss in the legislative elections and the execution of Ntidendereza and Biroli, the party ceased to be a viable political force. Ntidendereza and his brother were buried in the Mushasha cemetery in Gitega.

== Works cited ==
- Lemarchand, René (1970). Rwanda and Burundi. New York: Praeger Publishers. OCLC 254366212.
- McDonald, Gordon C., ed. (1969). Area Handbook for Burundi (PDF). Washington, D.C.: U.S. Government Printing Office. OCLC 953395348. Archived (PDF) from the original on July 27, 2021.
- Philipp, Günther (1978). "Burundi". In Franz Nuscheler; Klaus Ziemer (eds.). Die Wahl der Parlamente und anderer Staatsorgane. Band 2: Afrika (in German). Berlin: Walter de Gruyter. pp. 567–604. ISBN 978-3-11-004518-5.
- Poppe, Guy (2015). "The murder of Burundi's prime minister, Louis Rwagasore". Afrika Focus. 28 (2): 156–164. doi:10.1163/2031356X-02802011.
- Russell, Aidan (2019). Politics and Violence in Burundi: The Language of Truth in an Emerging State. Cambridge University Press. ISBN 978-1-108-49934-7.
- Weinstein, Warren (1976). Historical Dictionary of Burundi. Metuchen: Scarecrow Press. ISBN 978-0-8108-0962-8.
