= 1965 Burundian coup attempt =

1965 coup attempt in Burundi

- Location of Burundi in Central Africa
- Date: 18–19 October 1965
- Location: Bujumbura, Kingdom of Burundi
- Type: Military coup
- Cause: Ethnic tensions between Hutus and Tutsis; Mwambutsa IV's perceived interference in government by Hutu leaders
- Organised by: Antoine Serukwavu
- Participants: Faction within the gendarmerie and army
- Outcome: Coup fails: Mwambutsa IV remains on the throne but moves into exile; 86 alleged conspirators executed; Several thousand civilians killed in ethnic violence

An attempted coup d'etat in Burundi took place between 18–19 October 1965, when a group of ethnic Hutu officers from the Burundian military and gendarmerie attempted to overthrow Burundi's government. The rebels were frustrated with the king (mwami) of Burundi, Mwambutsa IV, who had repeatedly attempted to cement his control over the government and bypassed parliamentary norms despite Hutu electoral gains. Although the prime minister was shot and wounded, the coup failed due to the intervention of a contingent of troops led by Captain Michel Micombero.

The attempted coup d'état provoked a backlash against Hutus in which thousands of people, including the participants in the coup, were killed. The coup also facilitated a militant Tutsi backlash against the monarchy resulting in two further coups which culminated in the abolition of the monarchy in November 1966 and the proclamation of a republic with Micombero as President of Burundi.

== Background ==
In 1962, the Belgian trust territory of Ruanda-Urundi received independence, creating the Republic of Rwanda and the Kingdom of Burundi. Both states historically had monarchies with members of the Tutsi ethnic group holding higher social prestige over a Hutu ethnic majority, but Rwanda's monarchy was abolished by a political revolution in 1959–1961. In Burundi the Mwami (king), Mwambutsa IV, was popular with all groups but was himself Ganwa. Tutsis, Hutus and Ganwas were part of the dominant political party, the Union for National Progress (Union pour le Progrès national, UPRONA).

On 13 October 1961, the Prime Minister of Burundi, UPRONA leader Louis Rwagasore, was assassinated in a plot devised by political rivals with the support of some Belgian officials. His death derailed his attempts to build national inter-ethnic cohesion and facilitated the growth of Hutu-Tutsi tensions. His murder also stoked divisions in UPRONA, and fueled a rivalry between Hutu politician Paul Mirerekano and the new Ganwa prime minister, André Muhirwa. Both claimed to be the heirs to Rwagasore's legacy and both sought to become president of UPRONA in his wake. The controversy led to the coalescing of two factions in the party, with Muhirwa leading the Tutsi-dominated "Casablanca group" and Mirekano leading the Hutu-led "Monrovia group". The former was generally anti-West in its political orientation, while the latter took a more moderate stance on the West.

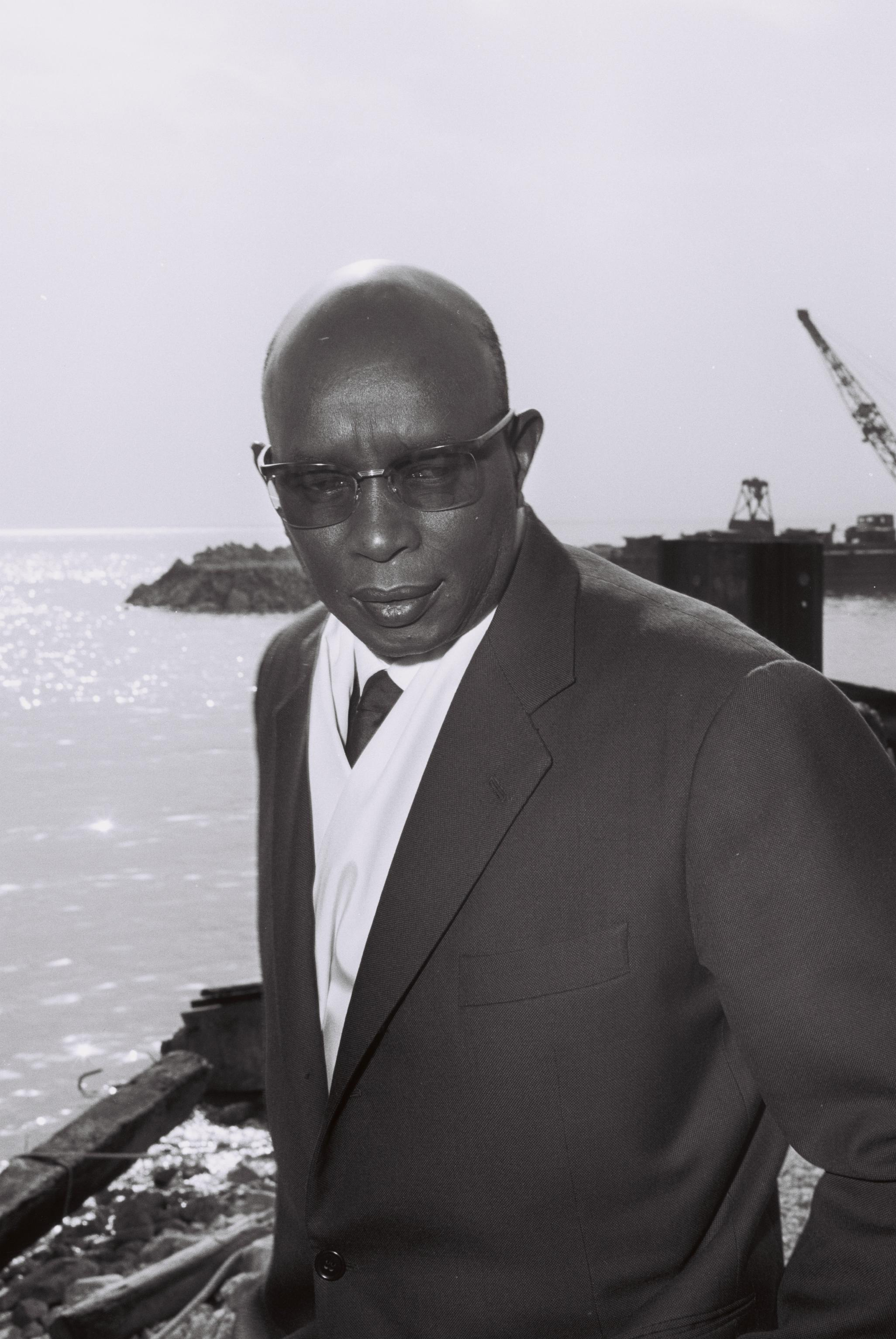
The actions of Mwami Mwambutsa IV (pictured in 1962) angered Hutu political leaders before the coup attempt.

After Muhirwa's government resigned in 1963, the Mwami consolidated power in the court, and he attempted to cement his authority over the successive governments and bypassed parliamentary norms. This provoked protests from members of the National Assembly. Meanwhile, the Casablanca group grew increasingly close to the People's Republic of China, which used its connections in Burundi to support communist rebels in neighbouring states. Fearing a Chinese-sponsored coup was being planned, in January 1965 Mwambutsa dismissed Prime Minister Albin Nyamoya and asked Hutu politician Pierre Ngendandumwe to form a new government. Surprised by this development, the Casablanca leaders conspired with Rwandan refugees and assassinated Ngendandumwe a few days later. The government arrested several Rwandans as well as leading figures of the Casablanca group, but all of the charges were eventually dropped. The lack of a conviction for the murder became a grievance for Hutu politicians. Another Hutu, Joseph Bamina, was made Prime Minister as a compromise between the Casablanca and Monrovia factions.

With Ngendandumwe's death having created a political crisis, the Mwami scheduled new elections for the National Assembly. By then, Hutu political consciousness had risen and in the May 1965 contests 23 of the 33 seats in the Assembly were won by Hutus, and 10 of these were won by politicians from the Hutu-interest aligned Party of the People (PP). UPRONA won a majority 21 seats, but by then the party had lost cohesion and was overtaken by factionalism. Hutus were subsequently selected by the Assembly to lead its bureau. While discussions on the creation of a new government took place, Gervais Nyangoma offered himself as a candidate to be named prime minister. He was a Hutu who served as Director-General of the Prime Minister's Office and was critical of the monarchy. In August the Mwami rejected consideration of Nyangoma for the premiership, surprising Hutu deputies in the Assembly. Tutsi parliamentarians suggested Senator Thaddée Siryuyumunsi for the position, but he was also passed over. On 13 September Mwambutsa instead selected Léopold Biha, a trusted Ganwa associated with his court, to lead the government. The installation of Biha infuriated many Hutus and some extremist Tutsis; though he was personally well-respected, his appointment was viewed as an autocratic move by the Mwami. There were rumours that radical Tutsi army officers were planning a coup. While seven of the other 10 portfolios were granted to Hutus, giving them their first cabinet majority since independence, Hutu parliamentarians felt that the Mwami continued to exercise outsized influence over the government and that they did not have true control. Tutsi leaders were also angered, feeling that the government had been imposed upon them by the crown.

On 2 September Mwambutsa issued an arrêté-loi that reduced the number of communes in the country from 181 to 78 and made all burgomasters appointed functionaries responsible to the crown and the government instead of locally elected officials. Hutu politicians were infuriated by the Mwami's bypassing of the parliamentary government in issuing the decree and by removing their potential to consolidate their strength in communal elections. On 28 September a group of Hutu members of Parliament—including the officers of both the Assembly and the Senate—signed a letter declaring that they "absolutely refused to accept the provisions of the arrêté-loi". The recasting of the burgomasters was particularly sensitive since, after the elections, disruptions and complaints arose from the countryside involving disputes with local officials due to ethnic tensions and alleged discrimination. With resentment at the Mwami's increased involvement in politics building, talk of coup plots circulated among Hutu and Tutsi politicians and were repeated in reports by foreign observers.

== Coup attempt ==
Late in the night on 18 October 1965, Secretary of State for the Gendarmerie Antoine Serukwavu left Kamenge with several jeeps and troops, headed towards the Mwami's palace. Near there he was joined by a small group of mostly-Hutu paracommandos led by a Hutu non-commissioned officer (NCO), Budaga. They were quickly joined by a third group of putschists led by gendarmerie NCOs François Rusake and Albert Harimenshi. Rusake and Harimenshi proceeded to launch an attack on the palace, while a Hutu army officer, Banikwa, went to his barracks presumably to gather reinforcements. The New York Times estimated that about 120 gendarmes and soldiers were involved in the attack. They were aided by one of the Mwami's palace guards.

At the palace, the putschists shot three sentries. According to political scientist René Lemarchand, they then attempted to breach the compound, but were met with stiff resistance from the Mwami's personal guards. According to a report compiled by the United Nations High Commissioner for Refugees, the putschists briefly entered the palace and killed 10 Tutsi soldiers. The document reported rumours that Mwambutsa only avoided being captured because his telephone operator told him to hide in the palace and when the putschists confronted the operator he told them that the Mwami had already fled.

As Banikwa returned to his camp he was shot by a guard and thus unable to complete his mission. Army Captain Michel Micombero brought a contingent of loyalist troops to the palace and caught the putschists in a crossfire. Faced with this situation, they surrendered. While the battle was ongoing at the palace, a separate group of gendarmes drove to Biha's residence and beckoned him to step outside, saying the Mwami needed to see him. Unsuspecting of their motives, Biha obliged and the putschists fired at him point-blank, striking his shoulder, abdomen, and leg. Though seriously wounded, the prime minister escaped. Hutu troops also mutinied at Bujumbura's two main military camps, and order was not restored until the following morning. Faced with the failure of the coup, Serukwavu fled to Rwanda.

== Aftermath ==
=== Civil unrest ===
Shortly after the attempted putsch, bands of Hutu militants began attacking Tutsi families and setting fire to homes. Most disturbances took place in Muramvya Province, though violence occurred in other places, particularly around Cibitoke near Rwanda. Twa people also participated in the hostilities. The Muramvya attacks were largely attributed to the Jeunesse Mirerekano, a youth political organisation created by Mirerekano to support Hutu candidates for public office, though its role in the violence remains contested. At least 500 Tutsi civilians were killed, while approximately 1,000 sought shelter at a Catholic mission in Bukeye and an additional 500 found refuge at the mission in Muramvya. The army and "self-defence" groups under its supervision launched reprisals. In Muramvya, one local commissioner, Tharcisse Ntavyubhua, shot at nearly every Hutu he encountered. The incumbent Hutu governor of the province was executed and Ntavyubhua subsequently replaced him. An estimated 2,500–5,000 Hutus were killed, and hundreds more imprisoned, including in Gitega Province, where there had been no violence. Approximately 4,000 refugees fled to Rwanda.

=== Government response ===
Shaken by the fighting, Mwambutsa fled his palace and by the morning of 19 October had taken refuge in the city of Uvira in the Democratic Republic of the Congo. He only returned to Bujumbura after white mercenaries in the employ of the Armée Nationale Congolaise determined that it would be safe for him to do so. That evening he delivered radio broadcast proclaiming Burundi to be under martial law and formally dismissing Serukwavu. Nevertheless, he stayed for only several days and fled to Europe on 2 November. He never returned to Burundi, and in Lemarchand's view his departure greatly tarnished the image of the monarchy. Biha also went to Belgium for several weeks to be treated for his injuries; Mathieu Muhakwanke served as acting premier in his absence. The remnants of his government set about repressing the perpetrators of the coup and suspected collaborators.

On 21 October, a government-sponsored conseil de guerre sentenced 34 army personnel to death. They were executed by firing squad later that day. Four days later nine gendarmes—including four officers—were executed. Satisfied that the armed forces had been dealt with, the government then began detaining Hutu politicians. On 28 October, 10 were tried before the conseil de guerre and executed. The International Commission of Jurists reported that 86 people were executed in improvised tribunals jointly managed by the army and the Ministry of Justice. Among the most prominent persons executed were director general Gervais Nyangoma; Emile Bucumi and Paul Mirerekano, President and Second Vice-President of the National Assembly, respectively; Senate President Sylvestre Karibwami and senator Ignace Ndimanya; Party of the People President Paul Nibirantiza; Minister of Economy and Commerce Pierre Burarame; and chef de cabinet in the Ministry of Economy Bernard Niyirikana. All the signatories of the September letter of protest to the Mwami were killed. Bamina was arrested and eventually executed in December. Senator Claver Nuwinkware, a former minister, was detained but eventually released several months later. Nyangoma was generally presumed by the government to have proposed the putsch. According to Lemarchand, some Hutu politicians and civil servants were probably involved in the plot, but a substantial number of those executed were innocent. Serukwavu asserted that no politicians were involved in his plot. The government repression was ultimately denounced by the International Commission of Jurists, the International Labour Organization, the International Federation of Christian Trade Unions, and the International Committee of the Red Cross. Some Hutu UPRONA members who escaped the purge gathered in Butare, Rwanda, and founded the Parti Démocrate Hutu, an organisation dedicated to launching a Hutu revolution in Burundi.

As Mwambutsa fled to Europe he suspended the powers of the Biha government, leaving all authority with the ministries' director-generals, the secretaries of state, and the provincial governors. Mwambutsa restored the powers of the Biha government on 20 November. However, with the Mwami outside of the country and the prime minister incapable of discharging his duties, de facto governance fell to the army and the civil service. In December the Foreign Ministry ordered the expulsion of Donald A. Dumont, the United States Ambassador, accusing him of "rightly or wrongly" being under suspicion of having alleged contacts with the perpetrators of the coup attempt. The United States government denied any involvement and asked for evidence of such, but the Burundian authorities never provided any.

== Long-term implications ==
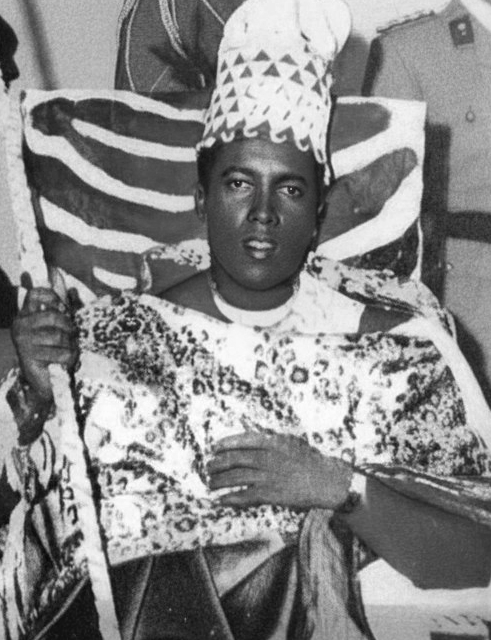
After trying to govern from abroad, Mwambutsa turned power over to his son, Charles Ndizeye (pictured at his coronation).

Parliament ceased to exist in wake of the coup and was not reconstituted until 1982. Faced with the difficulties of trying to govern from abroad and being increasingly attracted to a comfortable life in Europe, on 24 March 1966 Mwambutsa issued a decree giving Crown Prince Charles Ndizeye "special powers to co-ordinate and control the activities of the government and the secretariats of state". The Mwami did not specify whether he was de facto abdicating the throne. In the meantime, young army officers, junior civil servants, and cadres from radical youth organisations—all mostly Tutsi—became increasingly aware of the influence which they had gained in government. The army group, led by Micombero, was predominant in this informal coalition. Tutsi intellectuals and radicals—especially Gilles Bimazubute—began calling for the removal of the Biha government and the dissolution of the monarchy.

On 8 July 1966 Ndizeye took control of the government and became the new head of state of Burundi. His usurpation was orchestrated by the young radicals and army officers with the hope that they could shape the nature of the Burundian regime while using the symbols of the monarchy to retain legitimacy. Ndizeye dismissed the Biha government and appointed a new one led by Micombero as prime minister. On 1 September he was formally crowned as Mwami Ntare V. Soon thereafter conflict arose between Ntare, who wished to actively rule, and the new government and its supporters, eager to implement progressive reforms without interference from the crown. On 28 November, while Ntare was abroad, the army launched a coup. The army proclaimed the transformation of Burundi into a republic under the leadership of a National Revolutionary Council and Micombero as the new President of Burundi. In the following years, some Tutsi government officials feared that Hutu soldiers would attempt to enact a "repeat of '65". A plot by Hutu army personnel was uncovered in September 1969, and in response the Micombero regime purged the armed forces and government, solidifying Tutsi hegemony in the country.

The attempted putsch has generally been portrayed in historiography as a "Hutu coup". Burundian academic opinion on the coup attempt remains divided along ethnic lines, with Hutu writers being more sympathetic to the perpetrators and Tutsi writers portraying them more negatively. Different accounts of the events are offered, with some scholars suggesting that the putschists located and addressed the Mwami in his palace, and some saying the coup failed when the rebellious soldiers and gendarmes began shooting at each other in confusion. There is also debate surrounding the motives of the putschists, such as whether they intended to capture or kill the Mwami, or whether they intended to repress the Tutsi population after seizing power. Some Hutu scholars suggest that Tutsi officers were party to the plot and opportunistically blamed it on Hutus to their advantage.
