= Paul Mirerekano =

Burundian politician

First Vice-President of National Assembly of Burundi
- In office 20 July 1965 – October 1965

Personal details
- Born: 1921 Kavuma, Bukeye, Muramvya Province, Ruanda-Urundi
- Died: October 1965 (aged 43–44) Burundi
- Political party: Union for National Progress

Paul Mirerekano (1921 – October 1965) was a Burundian politician. Ethnically Hutu, he worked as an agronomist for the Belgian colonial administration in Ruanda-Urundi before starting a successful market garden in Bugarama. Politically, he was a nationalist, monarchist, and advocate for Hutu civil rights. He was a leading member of Louis Rwagasore's political party, the Union for National Progress (UPRONA), and in 1961 served as the organisation's interim president. Rwagasore's assassination in 1961 fueled a rivalry between Mirerekano and Prime Minister André Muhirwa, as both men claimed to be the heirs to Rwagasore's legacy and sought to take control of UPRONA. The controversy led to the coalescing of two factions in the party, with Mirerekano leading what became known as the Hutu-dominated "Monrovia group". His criticism of Muhirwa and his successor led him to be arrested on several occasions, but in 1965 he was elected to a seat in the National Assembly representing the Bujumbura constituency. The body subsequently elected Mirerekano its First Vice-President on 20 July. In October Hutu soldiers launched a coup attempt which failed, but led to the outbreak of ethnic violence. The government believed Mirerekano helped plan the coup attempt and executed him. His reputation remains a controversial subject in Burundi.

== Early life ==
Paul Mirerekano was born at the hill of Kavuma in Bukeye, Muramvya Province, Ruanda-Urundi, in 1921. He was ethnically Hutu. He studied agriculture for six years at the Groupe Scolaire de Astrida graduating in 1944. He became an auxiliary agronomist, working for the Belgian colonial administration in Usumbura (present-day Bujumubura). In 1955 the administration sought to transfer him to Ruhengeri in Ruanda. Dissatisfied with this, he quit his job and established a market garden to support farmers in Bugarama and arranged for their produce to be transported to Usumbura for sale. The cooperative venture, which primarily benefitted Hutus, was financially successful and enhanced his public reputation. He married a Tutsi, Catherine Siniremera, and had several children with her.

== Political career ==
Politically, Mirerekano advocated for the civil rights of Hutus, supported the Urundian monarchy, and was a nationalist. A member of the évolué social class, he was granted a carte de mérite civique (Note: The carte de mérite civique, or civic merit card, was introduced by the administration in Belgian Africa in 1948 to be granted to Africans who were monogamous, free of a criminal record, and usually literate. Cardholders were entitled to "certain special rights" in colonial society usually reserved for Europeans. In time these came to include exemptions from curfew policies, corporal punishment, detention in prisons for Africans, and right to criminal trial in courts for Europeans. Four seats on the Conseil Supérieur du Pays were reserved for cardholders.) by the Belgian administration and made a member of the Conseil Supérieur du Pays, an advisory body to the colonial authorities, serving from 1954 to 1957. During this time he began making public demands for reform, appealing to King Baudouin of Belgium to assist peasants in 1955, (Note: The two met in person during Baudouin's trip to Urundi in 1955.) denouncing administration manipulations of royal domains in 1958, and criticising colonial paternalism in 1959.

A friend of Louis Rwagasore, Mirerekano joined the latter's political party, the Union for National Progress (UPRONA) by late 1958. (Note: Some sources report that Mirerekano was the original founder of the party.) In that capacity he became the party treasurer and acted as a liaison between UPRONA and the Mouvement National Congolais in the neighboring Belgian Congo. Mirerekano attended the Republic of the Congo's independence celebrations on 30 June 1960 in Léopoldville. Having provoked the ire of the colonial administration in Urundi, he chose to remain in the Congo to avoid arrest. He returned to Urundi in mid-1961 to help prepare UPRONA for the 1961 legislative elections and was made interim party president by Rwagasore. That year he published a political manifesto, Mbire gito canje... (Listen my son...) in which he called for respect of tradition and stressed the important of reciprocity in relationships between members of different castes in Urundi's social hierarchy. The work became popular among UPRONA members.

"[S]ubjection has always existed, and here, as in other countries, the welfare of the people depends on reciprocal obligations."

— Mirerekano in Mbire gito canje..., 1961

In the elections UPRONA won an overwhelming majority of the seats in the Legislative Assembly, and Rwagasore was asked to form a government. He did not include Mirerekano in his government, reportedly to the latter's disappointment. (Note: According to Selon B. F. Kiraranganya, Rwagasore had said to a gathering that he did not plan on including Mirerekano in his government because he wanted him to be UPRONA president.) On 13 October 1961 Rwagasore was assassinated in a plot conceived by members of an opposition party. His death stoked divisions in UPRONA, and fueled a rivalry between Mirerekano and the new Ganwa prime minister, André Muhirwa. Both claimed to be the heirs to the late prime minister's legacy and both sought to become president of UPRONA in his wake. Muhirwa initially claimed the presidency, arguing that since he had taken over Rwagasore's place in government he was entitled to lead the party. Mirerekano contested this on the grounds that Rwagasore had made him interim party president in mid-1961. A caucus of several UPRONA leaders met on 4 July 1962 to settle the dispute and confirmed Muhirwa's ascension to the party presidency. UPRONA's central committee also dismissed Mirerekano from his post as the organisation's treasurer. That month Urundi became independent as the Kingdom of Burundi.

In an attempt to overturn the outcome of the UPRONA leadership dispute, Mirerekano called a mass meeting of party members at Rwagasore Stadium in Bujumbura on 26 August. Before a crowd of approximately 2,000 people, he angrily denounced the Muhirwa Government for nepotism and displays of ethnic favoritism, and accused it of betraying Rwagasore's wishes. Minister of Interior Jean Ntiruhwama ordered the gendarmerie to arrest Mirerekano for hosting an illegal gathering. Several detachments were dispatched to the stadium, but about 60 gendarmes rallied to his side and acted as his personal guard, while the others took no action. The army was placed on alert, but the crisis resolved without its deployment.

At Mwami Mwambutsa IV's intervention, an UPRONA mass congress was held in September to resolve the leadership dispute, which led to both Mirerekano and Muhirwa being assigned vice presidencies in the party. The controversy led to the coalescing of two factions in the party, with Muhirwa leading the Tutsi-dominated "Casablanca group" and Mirekano leading the Hutu-led "Monrovia group". The former was generally anti-West in its political orientation, while the latter took a more moderate stance on the West. Unsatisfied with the results of the congress, Mirerekano refused to attend any meetings of the newly-constituted central committee and organised his own UPRONA wing, of which he became president. He circulated numerous tracts criticising Muhirwa and the leaders of the Casablanca group. He also called for a renewed investigation into Rwagasore's murder, and accused Muhirwa of opposing this because he was from the same Ganwa clan as the implicated perpetrators.

In February 1963 Mirerekano was accused at an UPRONA meeting of cultivating links with the Party of the Hutu Emancipation Movement, the dominant political party in Rwanda, with the goal of starting a Hutu revolution similar to that which had occurred in Rwanda. The attorney general ordered his arrest on 26 February but he was released several days later due to lack of evidence. He fled to Uvira in the Congo but later returned. In June 1964 he was accused of plotting against the government of Prime Minister of Albin Nyamoya and fled again to Butare, Rwanda. He came back to Burundi in early 1965 after Nyamoya's government collapsed. In preparation for the May 1965 elections, he organised the Jeunesse Mirerekano, a group designed to spread Hutu propaganda and support Hutu candidates. (Note: The organisation was also known as the Jeunesse Ngendandumwe, after assassinated Hutu politician Pierre Ngendandumwe.)

Mirerekano contested a seat in the National Assembly in the Bujumbura constituency during the elections. He remained in exile during this time while his wife managed his campaign, ultimately winning by an overwhelming majority. His candidacy had caused unease among some Tutsi officials and had led Secretary of State for the Army Michel Micombero and Secretary of State for Justice Sixte Butera to plan to sentence him to 21 years in prison, but they backed away from the idea due to Mirerekano's strong electoral showing. The Assembly subsequently elected Mirerekano its First Vice-President on 20 July.

== Execution ==
In October 1965 Hutu soldiers launched a coup attempt. The coup failed, but in its aftermath ethnic violence broke out in the countryside. The Jeunesse Mirerekano was reportedly involved in attacks against Tutsis in Muramvya, though this remains contested. Mirerekano, believed to have helped plan the coup attempt, was arrested by the government, tried by military tribunal, and executed on either 19 or 25 October. His youth group was subsequently disbanded and his market garden project collapsed after many Hutus involved with it were killed. In July 2013 the National Assembly hosted a ceremony to commemorate him. It remains unknown where his body was buried and his reputation remains a controversial subject in Burundi.

== Works cited ==
- Banshimiyubusa, Denis (2018). Les enjeux et défis de la démocratisation au Burundi. Essai d'analyse et d'interprétation à partir des partis politiques (PDF) (PhD thesis) (in French). Université Pau et des Pays de l'Adour. OCLC 1085890695.
- De Witte, Ludo (2021). Meurtre Au Burundi : La Belgique et l'assassinat de Rwagasore (in French). Editions IWACU, Investig' Action. ISBN 978-2-930827-87-2.
- Dickerman, Carol Wilson (1984). Economic and Social Change in an African City: Bujumbura, Burundi, 1900–1962 (PhD thesis). Madison: University of Wisconsin. OCLC 614044351.
- Eggers, Ellen K. (2006). Historical Dictionary of Burundi (third ed.). Lanham: Scarecrow Press. ISBN 978-0-8108-5302-7.
- Lemarchand, René (December 1966). "Social Change and Political Modernisation in Burundi". The Journal of Modern African Studies. 4 (4): 401–433. doi:10.1017/S0022278X00013719. JSTOR 159097. S2CID 153869124.
- Lemarchand, René (1970). Rwanda and Burundi. New York: Praeger Publishers. OCLC 254366212.
- Weinstein, Warren (1976). Historical Dictionary of Burundi. Metuchen: Scarecrow Press. ISBN 978-0-8108-0962-8.
