= Léopold Biha =

Prime Minister of Burundi (1965–1966)

7th Prime Minister of Burundi
- In office 13 September 1965 – 8 July 1966
- Monarch: Mwambutsa IV
- Preceded by: Joseph Bamina
- Succeeded by: Michel Micombero

Personal details
- Born: 1919 Muramvya Province, Ruanda-Urundi
- Died: 2003 (aged 83–84)
- Party: Union for National Progress (UPRONA); Burundi Populaire (BP); Parliamentary Monarchist Party (PMP)

Léopold Bihumugani (1919–2003), better known as Léopold Biha, was a Burundian politician who served as Prime Minister of Burundi from 13 September 1965 until 8 July 1966. An ethnic Ganwa born to a chief in Ruanda-Urundi, he became a close confidant of Mwami Mwambutsa IV in the 1940s after being given charge of a chiefdom which included some of the monarch's property. In the late 1950s he became involved in the Union for National Progress (UPRONA) party as the Belgian colonial administration prepared to grant Burundi its independence. Biha left the party after becoming disenchanted with leader Louis Rwagasore's populist style, and held different roles in transitional governments. He created a new party, Burundi Populaire, but failed to get elected to office and was appointed private secretary to the Mwami after independence.

Following a political crisis and a rise in ethnic tensions in 1965, Mwambutsa appointed Biha as Prime Minister. Hutu and Tutsi politicians were both dissatisfied by his selection, and Biha was seriously wounded in an October coup attempt. He spent several months convalescing in Belgium before returning to Burundi to resume his post in February 1966. He was removed from office during a coup launched by Mwambutsa's son, Crown Prince Charles Ndizeye, in July. He was arrested two months later and, after his release, avoided politics for decades. He co-founded a monarchist party in 2001 and died two years later.

== Early life ==
Léopold Bihumugani was born in 1919 to Burundian Chief Bagorikunda in Muramvya Province, Ruanda-Urundi. Ethnically, he was a Ganwa of the Bezi lineage. He was educated at the Groupe Scolaire de Astrida, graduating in 1940. The following year he was appointed Secretary of the Ngozi District and he worked in that capacity until 1944. He married and had several children. He was Roman Catholic and could speak French and some Kiswahili and English.

== Political career ==
=== Relationship with the monarchy ===
On 29 August 1944 Biha was appointed chief of a jurisdiction in Muramvya formally managed by his father, which encompassed the commune of Mbuye. In 1945 he was given charge of the Muramvya chiefdom, a position which included oversight of Mwami Mwambutsa IV's personal lands, and he subsequently became one of the Mwami's closest advisors. He accompanied Mwambutsa on his first trip to Europe in 1950. While overseeing the Muramvya chiefdom he instituted social reforms which removed previous systems of servility and created institutions to teach women home economics. Prior to government reforms in 1958, he would serve as regent when the Mwami was out of the country. He also served as Vice President of the Conseil Supérieur du Pays (Supreme Land Council) from 1954 until its adjournment sine die in 1959. (Note: The Conseil Supérieur du Pays was an advisory body presided over by the Mwami that had some competence over budgetary and administrative affairs in Urundi.) In November and December 1960 he attended UNESCO conferences in Paris.

=== Early organising ===
Biha cofounded a political party, the Union for National Progress (Union pour le Progres National, UPRONA). Sources differ on the circumstances of UPRONA's founding. According to Biha, UPRONA was created in 1957 to protest a Belgian administrative reorganisation that placed Bujumbura and other major locales under their own direct jurisdiction, thus disempowering the monarchy. According to political scientist Warren Weinstein, UPRONA was created shortly after a 1958 meeting of customary chiefs and clergy convened by Biha and Prince Louis Rwagasore and to discuss nationalist ideas. Biha grew dissatisfied with the populist style and popularity of Rwagasore, who emerged as UPRONA's leader. At the time, Ruanda-Urundi was transitioning towards independence in the near future. Jean-Paul Harroy, Resident-General of Ruanda-Urundi, created the offices of national commissioners under his supervision on 21 July and named Burundians to the posts to give them a chance to practice self-government. Biha was named Commissioner for Finance and Budget, though UPRONA opposed his participation on the commission. He left the party in 1961. On 26 January 1961 the Harroy signed an ordinance creating an interim government in Urundi; Biha was appointed Minister of Finance. In response to UN General Assembly resolution 1605, on 6 July the government was modified and enlarged to grant more representation to different political parties, and Biha was dismissed and replaced by Pierre Ngendandumwe.

On 2 August 1961 Biha joined with two other Ganwa to found Burundi Populaire (BP), also known as Inararibonye. (Note: Inararibonye translates from Kirundi as "the Elders". The term was associated with a legend involving Mwami Mwezi IV, in which the ruler was saved by a group of elders after being choked by a lion skin.) Burundi hosted legislative elections on 18 September. With approximately 80% voter turnout, UPRONA won 58 of 64 seats in the Legislative Assembly, and Rwagasore was declared prime minister designate. Biha lost his bid for a seat in the legislature, and the new UPRONA government moved him to a chiefdom in Bururi Province in 1962. Shortly before the resignation of Prime Minister Ngendandumwe he was appointed private secretary to the Mwami.

=== Prime minister ===
In January 1965 Mwambutsa dismissed Prime Minister Albin Nyamoya and asked Ngendandumwe to form a new government. Ngendandumwe, a Hutu, was assassinated a few days later. The lack of a conviction for the murder became a grievance for Hutu politicians. Another Hutu, Joseph Bamina, was made Prime Minister as a compromise between Hutu and Tutsi factions. With Ngendandumwe's death having created a political crisis, the Mwami scheduled new elections for the National Assembly. By then, Hutu political consciousness had risen and in the May 1965 contests 23 of the 33 seats in the Assembly were won by Hutus, and 10 of these were won by politicians from the Hutu-interest aligned Party of the People (PP). UPRONA won a majority 21 seats, but by then the party had lost cohesion and was overtaken by factionalism. Hutus were subsequently selected by the Assembly to lead its bureau. While discussions on the creation of a new government took place, Gervais Nyangoma offered himself as a candidate to be named prime minister. He was a Hutu who served as Director-General of the Prime Minister's Office and was critical of the monarchy. In August the Mwami rejected consideration of Nyangoma for the premiership, surprising Hutu deputies in the Assembly.

On 13 September 1965 the Mwami appointed Biha as Prime Minister. The installation of Biha infuriated many Hutus and some extremist Tutsis; though he was personally well-respected, his appointment was viewed as an autocratic move by the Mwami. There were rumours that radical Tutsi army officers were planning a coup. While seven of the other 10 government portfolios were granted to Hutus, giving them their first cabinet majority since independence, Hutu parliamentarians felt that the Mwami continued to exercise outsized influence over the government and that they did not have true control. Tutsi leaders were also angered, feeling that the government had been imposed upon them by the crown.

Late in the night on 18 October, Hutu gendarmes and soldiers led by Secretary of State for the Gendarmerie Antoine Serukwavu mounted a coup attempt against the Burundian government. While one contingent of putschists attacked the royal palace, a separate group of gendarmes drove to Biha's residence and beckoned him to step outside. Unsuspecting of their motives, Biha obliged and the putschists fired at him point-blank, striking his shoulder, abdomen, and leg. Though seriously wounded, he escaped. Loyalist troops eventually suppressed the coup. As a result of the attempt, the Mwami fled to Europe while Biha went to Belgium for several weeks to be treated for his injuries. The remnants of his government set about repressing the perpetrators of the coup and suspected collaborators. Mwambutsa soon thereafter suspended the powers of the Biha government before restoring them on 20 November. However, with the Mwami outside of the country and the prime minister incapable of discharging his duties, de facto governance fell to the army and the civil service.

Biha returned to Burundi in February 1966. On 15 March his government was reformed and Biha assumed the portfolio for Civil Service, Sûreté and Immigration. On 24 March Mwambutsa issued a decree giving Crown Prince Charles Ndizeye "special powers to co-ordinate and control the activities of the government and the secretariats of state". Biha joined a council created to advise Charles. On 8 July 1966 Charles launched a coup, saying he taking complete control of the government. He suspended the constitution and dismissed Biha, replacing him with Captain Michel Micombero the following day. Biha was arrested in August and held in Rumonge prison. After his release he avoided politics.

== Later life ==
In 2001 Biha co-founded the Parliamentary Monarchist Party (Parti Monarchiste Parlementaire, PMP). He died in 2003 and was buried on 1 March in Mpanda Cemetery in Bujumbura.

== Works cited ==
- Eggers, Ellen K. (2006). Historical Dictionary of Burundi (third ed.). Lanham: Scarecrow Press. ISBN 978-0-8108-5302-7.
- Lemarchand, René (December 1966). "Social Change and Political Modernisation in Burundi". The Journal of Modern African Studies. 4 (4): 401–433. doi:10.1017/S0022278X00013719. JSTOR 159097. S2CID 153869124.
- Lemarchand, René (1970). Rwanda and Burundi. New York: Praeger Publishers. OCLC 254366212.
- Russell, Aiden (2019). Politics and Violence in Burundi: The Language of Truth in an Emerging State. Cambridge: Cambridge University Press. ISBN 978-1-108-49934-7.
- Weinstein, Warren (1976). Historical Dictionary of Burundi. Metuchen: Scarecrow Press. ISBN 9780810809628.
