= November 1966 Burundian coup d'état =

November 1966 coup d'état in Burundi

- Location of Burundi in Central Africa
- Date: 28 November 1966
- Location: Bujumbura, Kingdom of Burundi
- Type: Military coup
- Motive: Regime change
- Target: Royal Palace, Bujumbura
- Organised by: Michel Micombero
- Outcome: Coup succeeds: Ntare V is ousted by Prime Minister Michel Micombero; Micombero proclaimed a republic with himself as its first President

On 28 November 1966, Michel Micombero, Burundi's 26-year-old Prime Minister, ousted the 19-year-old king (mwami) of Burundi, Ntare V, in a coup d'état. Ntare was out of the country at the time and the coup leaders quickly succeeded in taking control. Micombero declared an end to the monarchy and the Kingdom of Burundi became a republic, with Micombero as its first President.

== Background ==
The November coup of 1966 was the last of three coups to take place in Burundi during 1965 and 1966. The previous coups (in October 1965 and July 1966) followed the assassination of the country's Prime Minister, Pierre Ngendandumwe on 15 January 1965, and the country's first parliamentary election in May 1965. The assassinations, attempted coups, contentious elections and ethnic cleansing campaigns combined to make the period immediately following independence a tumultuous one for Burundian society.

On 8 July 1966 Crown Prince Charles Ndizeye announced that he was assuming the role of head of state of Burundi. He suspended the constitution, dismissed Prime Minister Léopold Biha, and asked Captain Michel Micombero to form a new government. On 12 July Micombero's government was installed with himself as prime minister. On 1 September, Ndizeye had himself crowned as Mwami Ntare V. Tension developed between Ntare, who wanted to actively rule as a monarch, and Micombero's government, which had aligned itself to reform and saw little need for an involved king. In September Ntare attempted to dismiss the foreign minister, but Micombero countermanded the order and reassigned the minister to a different portfolio. After Ntare appointed secretaries for defense, gendarmerie, and justice, Micombero had the men arrested and purged the army of the monarch's supporters.

== Events ==
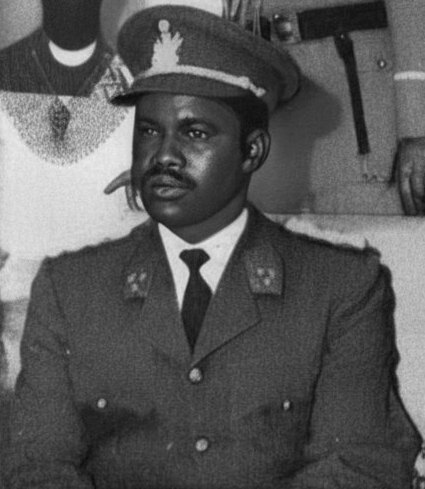
Michel Micombero, who took power in the coup, pictured as prime minister at the coronation ceremony of Mwami Ntare V two months prior to the coup

In his first move, Micombero announced the dissolution of the royal government and assumed the prerogatives of the head of state. Artémon Simbananiye, who served as Minister of Justice, was appointed Prosecutor General of the Republic. The governors of the provinces were replaced by officers. Before the formation of the new government, the National Revolutionary Committee was established on a temporary basis under the chairmanship of Micombero, which consisted only of officers.

Speaking on the radio, Micombero said:

I ask friendly countries not to interfere in our internal affairs... I want to make it clear that our international obligations will be respected. Our foreign policy remains unchanged. Our bonds of friendship with friendly countries remain intact. Our relations with the neighboring countries of the fraternal republics of Congo-Kinshasa, Tanzania and Rwanda will be improved. Freedom of religion will be guaranteed... I guarantee the safety of all Burundian citizens and all foreigners.

== Aftermath ==
There was little overt public response to Micombero's coup, and administration officials noted that rural residents seemed to be in a "stupor" in wake of the takeover. The new regime requested that its local officials report on how the population received its assumption of power. Some farmers feared civil war and refused to tend to their plots while citizens in the commune of Busiga felt that the coup meant the dissolution of the royalist UPRONA and its usurpation by the republican Parti du Peuple.

President Grégoire Kayibanda of Rwanda immediately extended his country's recognition to the new government of Burundi. Burundi's relations with Rwanda subsequently improved, and diplomatic relations between the two states were resumed.

== Works cited ==
- Lemarchand, René (1970). Rwanda and Burundi. New York: Praeger Publishers. OCLC 254366212.
- Russell, Aidan (2019). Politics and Violence in Burundi: The Language of Truth in an Emerging State. Cambridge: Cambridge University Press. ISBN 978-1-108-49934-7.
- Weinstein, Warren (1976). Historical Dictionary of Burundi. Metuchen: Scarecrow Press. ISBN 9780810809628.
