= Christian Democratic Party (Burundi) =

Political alliance in Burundi

The Christian Democratic Party (French: Parti Démocratique Chrétien, PDC) was a political alliance in Burundi.

== History ==
The PDC was established by brothers Joseph Biroli and Jean Ntitendereza shortly before independence after leaving the Union for National Progress (UPRONA). In September 1960 the party joined the Common Front alliance, alongside the Party of the People (PP), the Democratic and Rural Party, the People's Emancipation Party, the Murundi People's Voice and several other smaller parties.

Local elections in November and December 1960 saw the PDC emerge as the largest party, winning 2,004 seats to UPRONA's 545. However, in the September 1961 parliamentary elections the Common Front won only six seats, of which the PDC took just two. The alliance was heavily beaten by UPRONA, which won 58 seats.

In October 1961, UPRONA leader and Prime Minister Prince Louis Rwagasore was assassinated by Jean Kageorgis, who was in the pay of the PDC. The assassination was organised by Biroli and Ntitendereza with the encouragement of some Belgian officials, and aimed to create turmoil from which the PDC would benefit. After independence Biroli and Ntitendereza were sentenced to death; Biroli was killed on 14 January 1963, whilst Ntitendereza was hanged in Gitega in 1962. With the PDC's loss in the legislative elections and the execution of Ntidendereza and Biroli, the party ceased to be a viable political force.
