= Colonial University of Belgium =

Former Belgian university

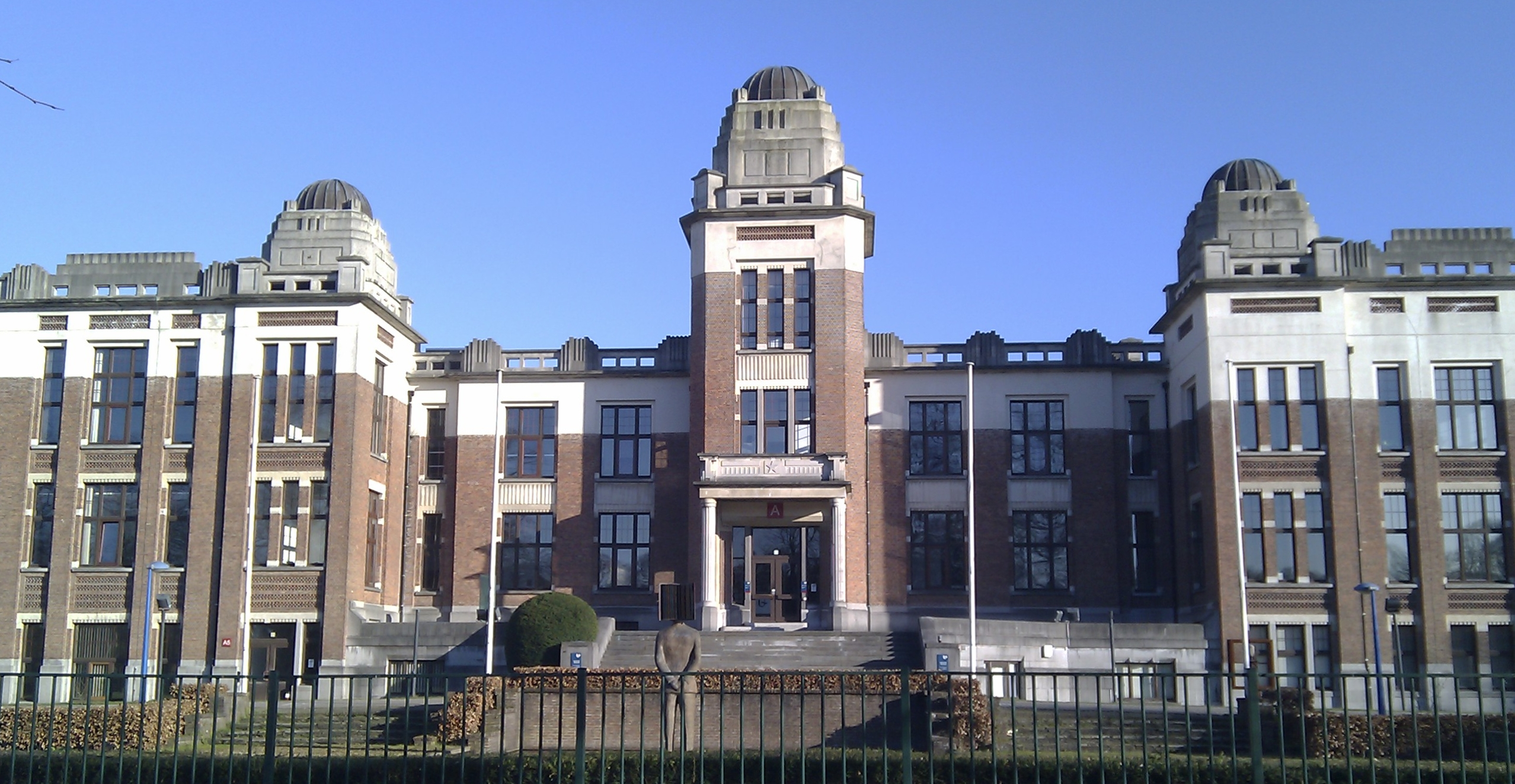
The building of the former Colonial University currently serves as the rectorate of the University of Antwerp and seat of the Antwerp University Association.

The Colonial University of Belgium (French: Université coloniale de Belgique, Dutch: Koloniale Hogeschool van België) was an institute of higher education located in Antwerp. Founded in 1920, the institute was established to prepare students for a careers as colonial functionaries in the Belgian Congo and Ruanda-Urundi. It was renamed the University Institute of Overseas Territories (French: Institut universitaire des territoires d'outre-mer, INUTOM; Dutch: Universitair Instituut voor de Overzeese Gebieden, UNIVOG) in 1949. It was dissolved in 1962.

== History ==
By 1908, public pressure and diplomatic manoeuvres led to the end of Leopold II's personal rule of the Congo Free State and to the annexation of the Congo as a colony of Belgium, known as the "Belgian Congo". In order to train future settlers for a (high) administrative function in the colony, the initiative was taken to found the École coloniale supérieure (Dutch: Hogere Koloniale School) by the Royal Decree of 11 February 1920 by Louis Franck, Minister of Colonies. In 1923, the school was restructured to become the Université coloniale de Belgique (Dutch: Koloniale Hoogeschool van België (UNIVOG)). The buildings near the Middelheim Open Air Sculpture Museum were officially inaugurated in November 1923 by King Albert I of Belgium. Colonel Charles Lemaire was the director, who was succeeded at the time of his death in 1926 by lieutenant Laude. In March 1929, the main building was damaged by a violent fire, but was immediately rebuilt. This new building was inaugurated in May 1931.

The institute was again renamed in 1949 to Institut universitaire des territoires d'outre-mer or INUTOM (Dutch: Universitair Instituut voor de Overzeese Gebieden, abbreviated to UNIOG, later UNIVOG)). Being an institute at university level, it issued degrees of colonial and administrative sciences, as well as commercial and colonial sciences.

After the independence of the Republic of the Congo in 1960, the INUTOM was discontinued in 1962. Its library was sold in 1963, and INUTOM merged with the Rijkshandelshogeschool (English: National Business School) and the Hoger Instituut voor Vertalers en Tolken (English: Institute of Higher Education for Translators and Interpreters) to the Rijksuniversitair Centrum Antwerpen (RUCA) (English: National University Centre Antwerp). From the merger of the institution with the department international cooperation of the Rijkshandelshogeschool, the College voor Ontwikkelingslanden (English: College for Developing Countries) emerged. In 2000 The College voor Ontwikkelingslanden merged again, this time with the Centrum Derde Wereld (English: Third World Centre) of the Saint Ignatius University Centre to form the Institute of Development Policy (IOB).

Nowadays, the university building functions as Building A of the Middelheim Campus of the University of Antwerp. In front of the main entrance, the five-pointed star of the Belgian Congo's flag is still visible.

== Students ==
The student association Association des Étudiants was founded at the École coloniale supérieure in 1921, and ceased to exist in 1965.

== Professors ==
- Jean-Marie Derscheid (1901-1944)

== Trivia ==
- According to one Antwerp urban legend, an elephant is supposed to be buried underneath the university building. When a fire erupted at circus Sarrasani in 1932, elephant Lady died. The cadaver was donated to professor Hasse, a biologist at the institute. He performed an autopsy on the animal with his students, after which Hasse and his students buried the remains next to the institute. After a local Antwerp television network made a documentary of the urban legend, they discovered that the elephant was reburied in 1934 and is nowadays preserved at the Museum of Natural Sciences in Brussels.
- The University of Antwerp named a historic auditorium after Patrice Lumumba in the building of the former Colonial University.
