= Ntare V of Burundi =

Last king of Burundi (July–November 1966)

Ntare V
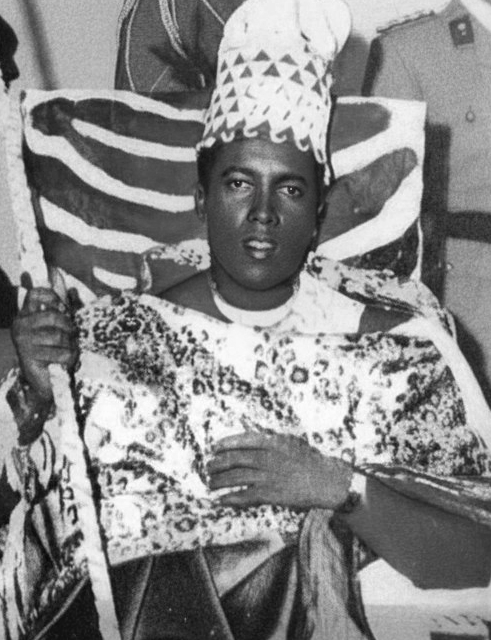
- King Ntare V at his coronation ceremony

King of Burundi
- Reign: 8 July 1966 – 28 November 1966
- Coronation: 3 September 1966
- Predecessor: Mwambutsa IV
- Successor: Monarchy abolished
- Prime minister: Michel Micombero
- Born: Prince Charles Ndizeye of Burundi; 2 December 1947; Gitega, Burundi, Ruanda-Urundi
- Died: 29 April 1972 (aged 24); Gitega, Burundi
- House: Ntwero
- Father: Mwambutsa IV Bangiricenge
- Mother: Baramparaye Ruhasha
- Religion: Catholicism

Ntare V of Burundi (born Charles Ndizeye; 2 December 1947 – 29 April 1972), less commonly numbered Ntare III, was the last king (mwami) of Burundi, reigning from July to November 1966. Until his accession, he was known as Crown Prince Charles Ndizeye.

He seized power in July 1966 by deposing his own father. He reigned until November, when prime minister Michel Micombero overthrew him, ending the Burundian monarchy. He went into exile but returned in 1972, only to be swiftly arrested by the republican government. Later that year, during a period of mass violence called the "Ikiza", he was killed under unclear circumstances.

== Early life ==
Charles Ndizeye was the son of King Mwambutsa IV (1912–1977) and Queen Baramparaye Ruhasha (1929–2007). He had one half-brother (Prince Louis Rwagasore, assassinated 1961 whilst prime minister), and two half-sisters: Princess Rosa Paula Iribagiza (born 1934) and Princess Regina Kanyange (died 1987). Ndizeye was educated at Institut Le Rosey in Switzerland.

== Ascension and rule ==
Crowning of Ntare V in Burundi

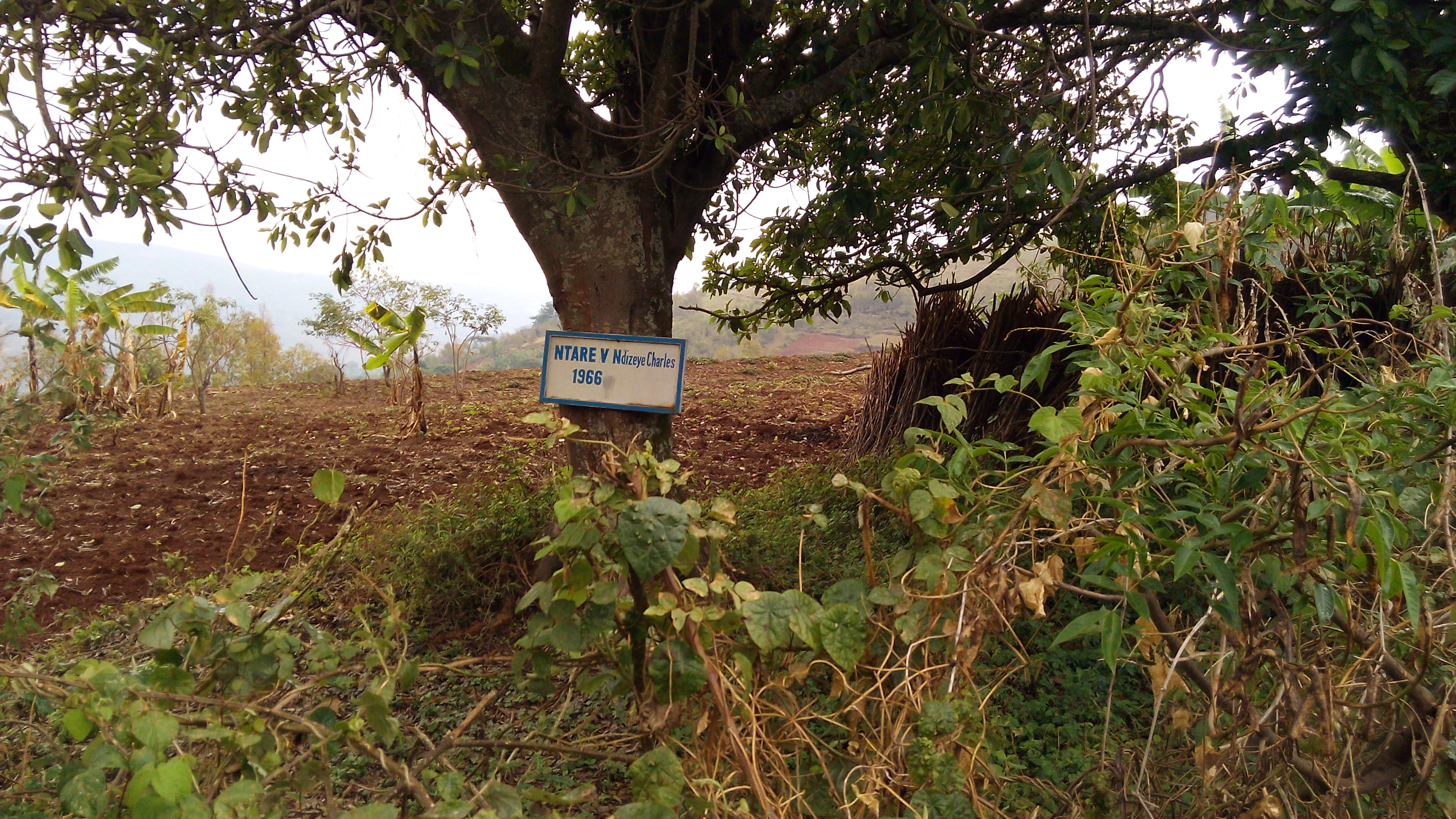
Modern-day view of the ceremonially planted tree (ikigabiro) from the coronation of Ntare V

After a Hutu-led coup attempt in October 1965, Mwambutsa IV went into exile in Switzerland, while Prime Minister Léopold Biha was hospitalized. Though the monarch attempted to rule from abroad, this effectively left Burundi without a state head. The country was also heavily affected by the coup's aftermath, as Tutsi officers under Michel Micombero purged the security forces and political leadership of Hutu figures. In March 1966, Mwambusta IV designated Charles Ndizeye, his only surviving son, as heir apparent and entrusted him with overseeing Burundi's government. The Crown Prince then formally deposed his father and his father's government in July 1966. On 8 July, Ndizeye declared the dismissal of Prime Minister Biha and the suspension of the constitution. The following day he asked Micombero to form a government. On 12 July Micombero presented his government to the prince with himself as Prime Minister and Minister of Defence. Ndizeye was formally crowned as mwami on 3 September, taking the regnal name Ntare V.

The cooperation between Ntare V and Micombero was short-lived. Tensions between the soldiers in the government and the monarchy emerged in August and led to a reshuffling of the cabinet in September. On 7 November Ntare V attempted to broadcast a decree dismissing Micombero's government, but was turned away from the radio station by soldiers. Three weeks later, Ntare V was in the Democratic Republic of the Congo on a state visit, celebrating the takeover of Mobutu Sese Seko. On 28 November, the king heard over radio that Micombero had led a military coup d'état, abolishing the monarchy and proclaiming Burundi a republic with himself as its first President. Overall, Ntare V had the shortest rule of any Burundian mwami.

Ntare V went into exile in West Germany and later Uganda. Meanwhile, Micombero's regime had to contend with various forms of resistance and conducted a series of purges. As time went on, the government's support base became increasingly narrow, and it marginalized not just Hutu but also certain Tutsi sub-groups like the Banyaruguru. In 1971, a group of Tutsi figures were arrested over an alleged plot to restore the monarchy.

== Execution ==
Ntare V returned to Burundi in March 1972. Ugandan President Idi Amin claimed he received a written guarantee from President Micombero that Ntare could return to Burundi and live there as a private citizen. Using the helicopter at his disposal from Amin, Ntare arrived. Within a few hours he was put under house arrest in the former palace in Gitega. Soon after, an official radio broadcast proclaimed that Ntare was trying to instigate a mercenary invasion of Burundi to take back rule. Whether the former monarch had really intended to peacefully return or actually plotted a takeover, as Micombero's government alleged, remains unclear. Some ministers favored keeping him under restricted protection in Gitega, while others wanted him dead. As the government discussed its next moves, Ntare remained under house arrest in Gitega.

On 29 April, Hutu rebels began an uprising against the Burundian government. Around the same time, Micombero dismissed his entire cabinet. At the evening of the same day, Ntare was assassinated by Burundian soldiers under circumstances which remain unclear. Whether there was a conspiracy or his death involved a spontaneous outbreak of violence in Gitega has not been determined. Researcher Nigel Watt argued that Ntare's murder was motivated by the Burundian government's fear that monarchists might support the Hutu rebellion; by the time of his death, the former mwami was seen as a champion of the interests of both Hutu as well as Tutsi-Banyaruguru marginalized by Micombero. Radio Nationale du Burundi (RNB Broadcasting) announced that the king was shot while attempting to escape from the palace where he had been "under arrest". The king's supporters claim he was taken from the Royal Palace and executed by a firing squad before being thrown into a common grave. The king was 24 years old. Meanwhile, the Hutu uprising was quelled by Micombero's forces. Between 80,000 and 210,000 people died in the ensuing mass killings of ethnic Hutus.

== Distinctions ==
=== National orders ===
- Grand Master of the Royal Order of Prince Louis Rwagasore.
- Grand Master of the Royal Order of Rukinzo (Royal Male Drum).
- Grand Master of the Royal Order of Karyenda (Royal Female Drum).
- Grand Master of the Military Order of Karyenda (Royal Female Drum).

=== Foreign honour ===
- Congo-Léopoldville: Grand Cross of the Order of the Leopard

== Ancestry ==
Ancestors of Ntare V of Burundi

8. Mwezi IV, Mwami of Burundi
4. Mutaga IV, Mwami of Burundi
9. Vyano, of the Bunyakarama clan
2. Mwambutsa IV, Mwami of Burundi
5. Princess Ngenzahago, of the Munyagisaka clan
1. Ntare V, King of Burundi
6. Umuganwa ntare Mathias Ruhasha, of the Bakundo clan
3. Baramparaye
7. Bernadette Mucereza

Ntare V of Burundi House of Ntwero Born: 2 December 1947 Died: 29 April 1972
Regnal titles
Preceded by Mwambutsa IV	King of Burundi; 8 July 1966 – 28 November 1966	Vacant Monarchy abolished
Political offices
Preceded by Mwambutsa IV as King of Burundi	Head of State of Burundi; 8 July 1966 – 28 November 1966	Succeeded by Michel Micombero as President of Burundi
