= Common Front =

Defunct political alliance in Burundi

The Common Front (French: Front Commun) was a political alliance in Burundi.

== History ==
The Common Front was established in 1960 as an alliance of the Party of the People (PP), the Christian Democratic Party (PDC), the Democratic and Rural Party, the People's Emancipation Party, the Murundi People's Voice and several other smaller parties. Based on the local election results in 1960, the Front supplied assigned eight of the ten delegates to a conference in Ostend, Belgium in January 1961, with the Union for National Progress (UPRONA) supplying the other two.

In the September 1961 parliamentary elections the alliance won six seats, of which the PP took four, but was heavily beaten by UPRONA, which won 58 seats.

The PP contested the 1965 parliamentary elections alone, winning 10 seats in the National Assembly and none in the Senate, whilst UPRONA won 21 seats in the National Assembly and 12 in the Senate.
