= 1965 Burundian parliamentary election =

Parliamentary elections were held in Burundi on 10 May 1965, the first since independence in 1962. Voters elected the National Assembly, which had been reduced from 64 to 33 seats. They followed the assassination of Prime Minister Pierre Ngendandumwe on 15 January 1965, and were won by the ruling Union for National Progress.

== Background ==
On January 15, 1965, Burundian Prime Minister Pierre Ngendandumwe was assassinated. In response, Mwami Mwambutsa IV dissolved Parliament on March 4 and called for new elections. New elections were declared on March 29 and were held on May 10.

== Results ==
=== National Assembly ===
Party	Seats	+/–
Union for National Progress	21	–37
Party of the People	10	+6
Other parties	0	0
Independents	2	New
Total	33	–31
Source: EISA, Lemarchand

=== Senate ===
Following the National Assembly elections, the 16-member Senate was filled. Eight members of the Senate were elected by the members of the National Assembly—each representing one of the county's provinces. The eight Senate members elected a further four members, with a further four appointed by the King. UPRONA held eight of the 12 seats.

== Aftermath ==
Despite the decisive victory by Hutu candidates in the election, King Mwambutsa IV appointed a Tutsi prince, Léopold Biha, as Prime Minister.

Tensions finally erupted into violence following an attempted coup by Hutu army officers in October 1965. The failed coup was followed by a major purge of Hutus in the armed forces. Hutu politicians and civilians were also killed. The following year Mwambutsa was overthrown by his son Ntare V, who was deposed in a military coup later in the year, ending the country's monarchy.

== Works cited ==
- Cornevin, Robert (24 August 1966). "Chance of Re-Establishing Peace In Burundi After Coup D'Etat". Translations on Sub-Saharan Africa. No. 420. United States Joint Publications Research Service. pp. 11–16.
- Lemarchand, René (1970). Rwanda and Burundi. New York: Praeger Publishers. OCLC 254366212.
- Russell, Aiden (2019). Politics and Violence in Burundi: The Language of Truth in an Emerging State. Cambridge University Press. ISBN 9781108499347.
- Weinstein, Warren (1976). Historical Dictionary of Burundi. Metuchen: Scarecrow Press. ISBN 9780810809628.
