= Mwambutsa IV of Burundi =

Penultimate king of Burundi from 1915 to 1966

Mwambutsa IV
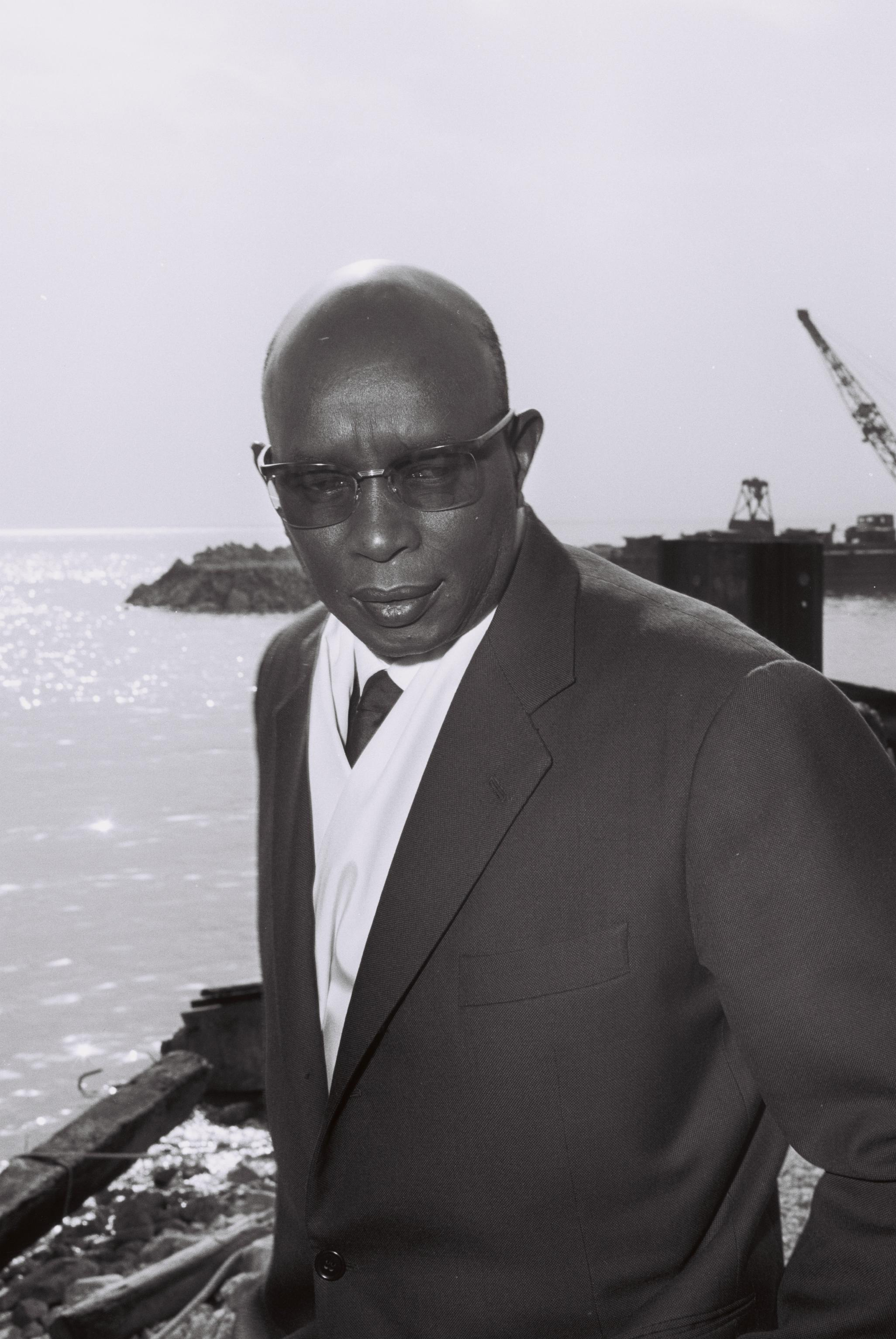
- Mwambutsa on a visit to Israel in 1962

King of Burundi
- Reign: 16 December 1915 – 8 July 1966
- Coronation: 16 December 1915
- Predecessor: Mutaga IV Mbikije
- Successor: Ntare V Ndizeye
- Prime ministers: See list: Joseph Cimpaye Louis Rwagasore André Muhirwa Pierre Ngendandumwe Albin Nyamoya Pié Masumbuko (Acting) Joseph Bamina Léopold Biha
- Born: Umuganwa (Prince) Bangiricenge of Burundi; 6 May 1912; Nyabiyogi, Burundi, German East Africa
- Died: 26 March 1977 (aged 64); Geneva, Switzerland
- Burial: Meyrin, Switzerland
- Spouse: Thérèse Kanyonga; Baramparaye Ruhasha (d. 2007)
- Issue: Louis Rwagasore; Rosa Paula Iribagiza; Régine Kanyange; Charles Ndizeye (Ntare V)
- House: Ntwero
- Father: Mutaga IV Mbikije
- Mother: Princess Ngenzahago
- Religion: Catholicism

Mwambutsa IV Bangiricenge (6 May 1912 – 26 March 1977) was the penultimate king (mwami) of Burundi who ruled between 1915 and 1966. He succeeded to the throne on the death of his father Mutaga IV Mbikije (reigned 1908–15). Born while Burundi was under German colonial rule, Mwambutsa's reign mostly coincided with Belgian colonial rule (1916–62). The Belgians retained the monarchs of both Rwanda and Burundi under the policy of indirect rule.

== Early life and regency ==
Mwambutsa IV was born Umuganwa (Prince) Bangiricenge in c. 1912 at Nyabiyogi, chiefdom of Buyenzi, Ruanda-Urundi. He was one of two sons of Mwami (king) Mutaga IV and Ngenzahayo. Like other Burundian kings, he was an ethnic Ganwa. He became king, taking the regnal name Mwambutsa, on 16 December 1915 when he was still a child following the death of his father in a family dispute. Because of his age, a regency was declared. Several family members, including Queen Mother Ririkumutima, served as regent. At the time of his coronation, Burundi was part of German East Africa but was captured by Belgium in 1916 during the East African campaign in World War I. In 1925, a full regency council was established with Belgian approval.

Mwambutsa underwent a traditional Burundian education until he was about the age of 13. In 1925 the Belgians opened a primary school in Muramvya so he could attend it. Two years later a Roman Catholic mission was established in Bukeye with the goal of further educating the prince and one day converting him to Catholicism. Mwambutsa's performance in school was undistinguished and he never converted.

== Colonial reign ==
Mwambutsa became a ruler in his own right on 28 August 1929, when the regency council declared he was of-age for the throne. On 24 December 1930 he married Thérèse Kanyonga, a Tutsi of the Abasine clan. He married her because she was Catholic.

Mwambutsa actively distanced himself from partisan politics, saying on 8 February 1960, "I do not belong to any political party...I do not authorize anyone and no party to claim exclusivity of my patronage or to discredit, in my name, any other party having as its goal the interest of the Barundi." In June 1962, shortly before Urundi's independence, he went on a tour of villages throughout the country to present a speech appealing to residents to commit to hard work and to respect law and order.

== Post-independence rule and exile ==
Urundi became independent as the Kingdom of Burundi on 1 July 1962. Mwambutsa attended ceremonies in Bujumbura to mark the occasion, reviewing troops of the Burundian National Army (Armée Nationale Burundaise). He delivered a speech in which he asked Burundians and foreign technicians to "work together in a common effort to make this Burundi a peaceful, hard-working, prosperous, and perfectly happy country."

On 15 December Mwambutsa was made a member of the Order of Pope Pius IX. He met with Pope John XXIII at Vatican City the following day.

On the independence of Burundi, Mwambutsa IV became the head of state of Burundi with far reaching political power. In Rwanda, the monarchy had been overthrown between 1959–62. He attempted to balance ethnic tensions between ethnic Hutu and Tutsi subjects by choosing his prime ministers from each ethnic group alternately. In October 1965, Hutu officers attempted a coup against the monarchy. Despite their failure to take power, Mwambutsa fled into exile in the Republic of the Congo, eventually moving to Switzerland. In March 1966 he designated his only surviving son Charles Ndizeye to exercise his powers in the country. Still in exile, Mwambutsa was officially deposed in a second coup that brought his son to power as Ntare V on 8 July 1966. The monarchy was finally abolished altogether in a third coup in November 1966 and its leader, Michel Micombero, came to power as president and dictator. Mwambutsa spent the rest of his life in Switzerland where he died in 1977.

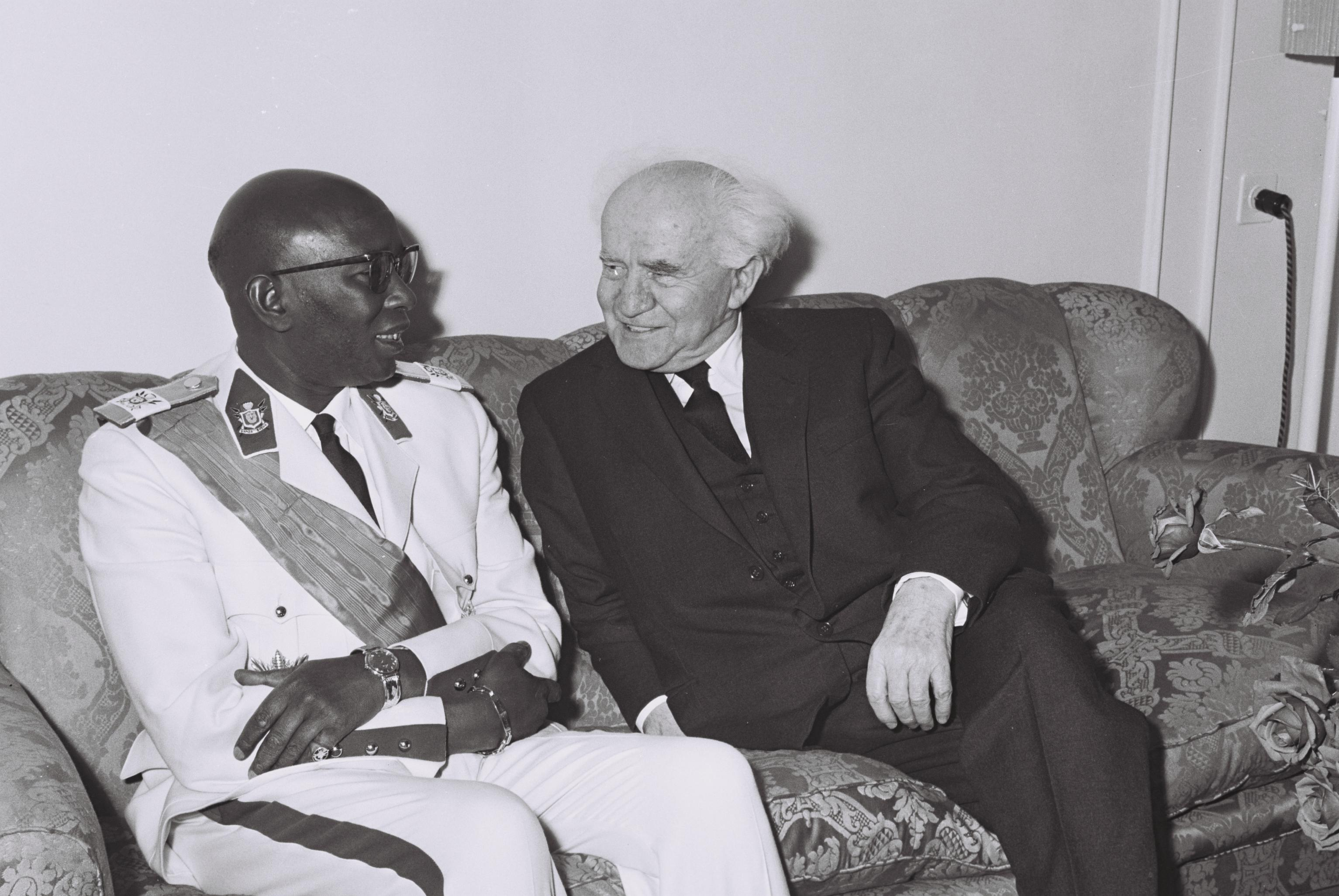
Mwambutsa IV and David Ben-Gurion in 1962

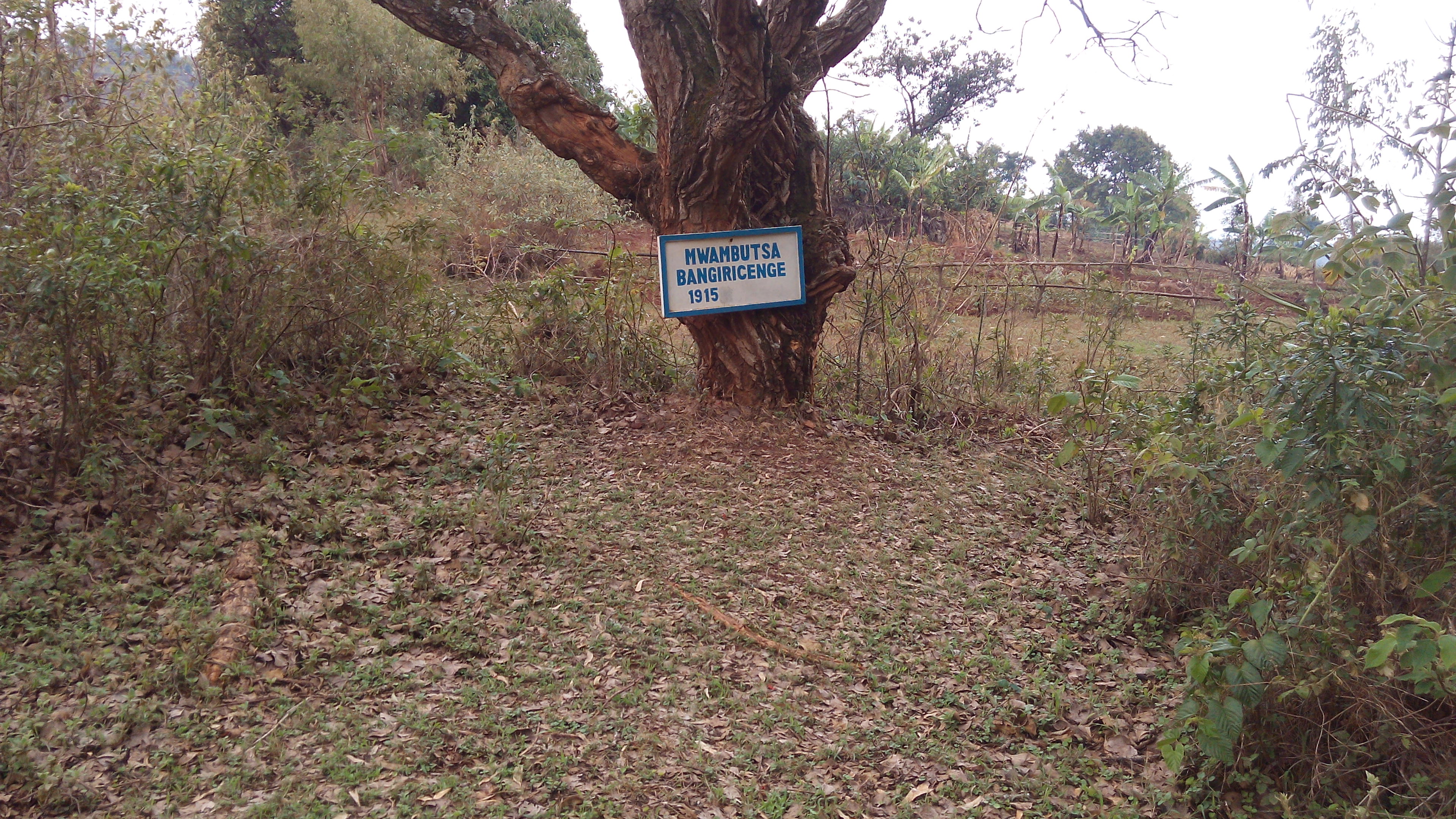
Modern-day view of the ceremonially planted tree (ikigabiro) from the coronation of Mwambutsa IV

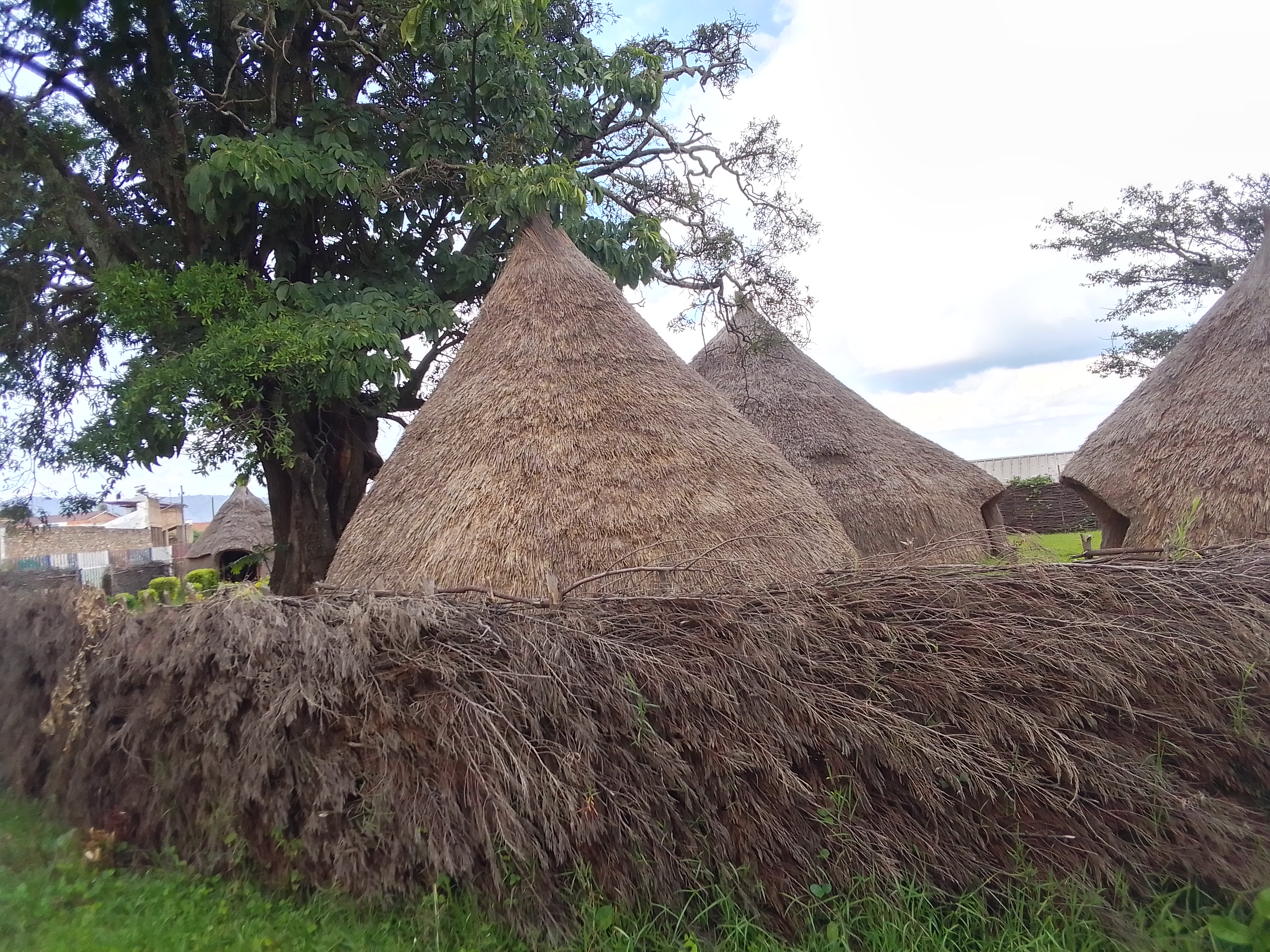
Modern-day view of the traditional palace (ibwami) of Mwambutsa IV

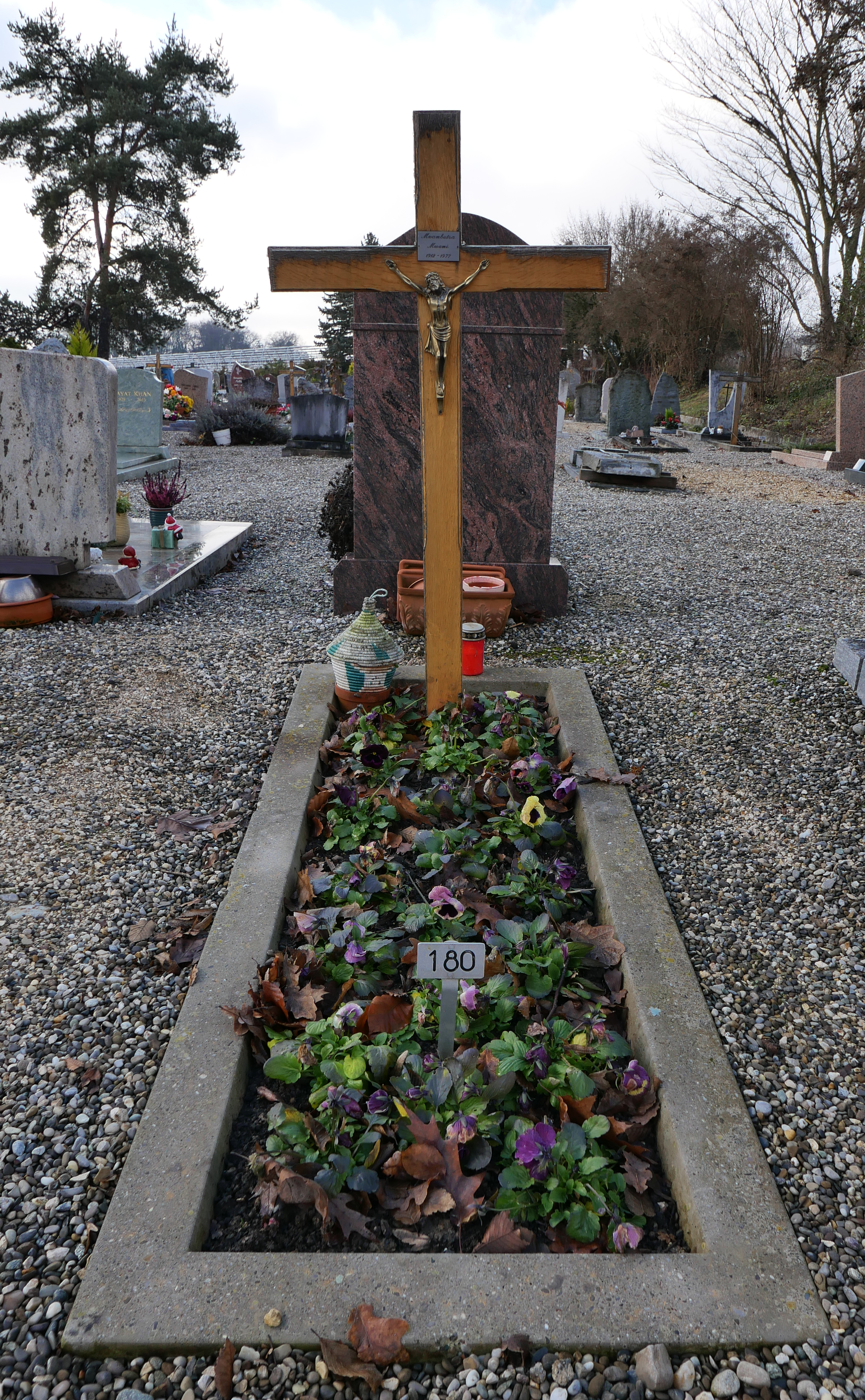
Grave of Mwambutsa IV

== Exhumation ==
Mwambutsa's remains were exhumed from their burial site in Switzerland in 2012 with a view to repatriating them to Burundi for a state funeral. After a legal battle, however, the remains were re-interred in Switzerland in 2016 in accordance with his family's wishes.

Mwambutsa IV of Burundi House of Ntwero Born: 6 May 1912 Died: 26 April 1977
Regnal titles
| Preceded by Mutaga IV | King of Burundi; 16 December 1915 – 8 July 1966 | Succeeded by Ntare V |
