= Joseph Cimpaye =

Burundian politician

1st Prime Minister of Burundi
- In office 26 January 1961 – 28 September 1961
- Monarch: Mwambutsa IV
- Governor: Jean-Paul Harroy
- Succeeded by: Louis Rwagasore

Personal details
- Born: 1929 Mugera, Gitega Province, Ruanda-Urundi (modern-day Burundi)
- Died: c.May 1972 (aged 42–43) Burundi
- Party: Union des parties populaires
- Known for: Author of first Burundian novel

Joseph Cimpaye (1929 – c.May 1972) was a Burundian politician and writer who served as the first prime minister of Burundi for a brief term in 1961 and is considered to have written the first Burundian novel.

Born into an educated family from the Hutu ethnic group, Cimpaye was considered one of Burundi's leading intellectuals in the late colonial period. He became involved in politics under Belgian colonial rule, co-founding the Union of Popular Parties (Union des parties populaires, UPP), a cartel which was opposed by the more popular anti-colonial Union for National Progress (Union pour le Progrès national, UPRONA). Cimpaye briefly held the position of prime minister in 1961 before UPRONA was decisively returned in the country's first elections ahead of Burundi's independence in July 1962. Although retiring from politics, he was later arrested under the regime of Michel Micombero in 1969.

While imprisoned, he wrote L'Homme de ma colline which has been acclaimed as the first Burundian novel. The work remained unpublished in his lifetime. He was among a number of influential Hutus killed in the genocidal violence of 1972 instigated by the Micombero regime.

== Early life ==
Joseph Cimpaye was born in 1929 in Mugera, a small town in Gitega Province, Ruanda-Urundi. His mother was ethnically Tutsi, while Joseph was Hutu. His father, Michel Cimpaye, worked as a medical assistant for the Belgian colonial administration. Joseph completed his primary education in Rulindo District in Ruanda, where his father was posted. He went on to receive a secondary education at the Groupe Scolaire d'Astrida, where he studied veterinary science until 1952. From then until 1957 he served as an assistant veterinarian in Rutana District. He subsequently became a laboratory technician at Astrida.

== Political career ==
Cimpaye became active in local politics and founded a short-lived political party called AMEHUTU in May 1960. At the time, Ruanda-Urundi was transitioning towards independence in the near future. Jean-Paul Harroy, Resident-General of Ruanda-Urundi, created the offices of national commissioners under his supervision on 21 July and named Burundians to the posts to give them a chance to practise self-government. Shortly after their creation, the number of portfolios was expanded and Cimpaye was named Commissioner of Public Works. He left his laboratory position to assume the office. In March 1961 Cimpaye co-founded the Union of Popular Parties (Union des parties populaires, UPP), a cartel to stand against the more popular Union for National Progress (Union pour le Progrès national, UPRONA) under Prince Louis Rwagasore. The UPP fractured into three tendencies, and Cimpaye and Emmanuel Nigane led one of these groups in trying to reach an understanding with UPRONA.

On 26 January 1961 the Belgian Governor-General of Ruanda-Urundi signed an ordinance creating an interim government in Urundi. The colonial administration selected Cimpaye to lead the government as Prime Minister of Urundi. In response to UN General Assembly resolution 1605, on 6 July the government was modified and enlarged to grant more representation to different political parties. Cimpaye served until September 1961. UPRONA won the country's first elections decisively that month and Rwagasore replaced Cimpaye as prime minister.

== Later life ==
Cimpaye left politics after UPRONA's victory and took up a career in journalism and public relations. Between October 1962 and November 1963 attended training seminars at the Institut Belge d'Information et de Documentation in Brussels and at the Centre universitaire d'enseignement du journalisme of the University of Strasbourg designed for African journalists. He later returned to Bujumbura and was hired by the Belgian airline Sabena on 2 January 1964 as a public relations specialist. He was later made head of sales for the Bujumubura office. In 1965 he married a Rwandan Tutsi businesswoman.

He was distrusted by Michel Micombero who came to power at the head of a radical Tutsi regime after a series of coups d'état in 1965–66. Cimpaye was arrested by the regime on 6 October 1969 for alleged involvement in a Hutu coup plot. In February 1970 he was sentenced to five years in prison. During his incarceration, he authored a French-language novel entitled L'homme de ma colline (lit. 'The Man From My Hill', or 'District') which followed the struggles of a protagonist named Benedikto living in a rural part of Burundi during the colonial era in the 1930s or 1940s. It addressed the theme of exile and was praised by Jean‐Marie Ngendahayo for its use of language, particular Kirundi proverbs in translation.

Cimpaye was released from prison in a general amnesty on 1 July 1971. He was among a number of Hutu elites killed during the Ikiza by Micombero's regime in May 1972.

== Works ==
- Cimpaye, Joseph (2013). L'homme de ma colline. Brussels: Archives & Musée de la Littérature. ISBN 978-2-871680-68-0.

== Works cited ==
- Lemarchand, René (1970). Rwanda and Burundi. New York: Praeger Publishers. OCLC 254366212.
- Ndoba, Gasana (2008). "L'Homme de ma colline par Joseph Cimpaye. Un exercise posthume de transmission littéraire". In Quaghebeur, Marc (ed.). Analyse et enseignement des littératures francophones: Tentatives, réticences, responsabilités. Actes du colloque de Paris, 31 mai-2 juin 2006. Bruxelles: PIE Peter Lang. pp. 315–20. ISBN 978-90-5201-478-4.
- Tshibola Kalengayi, Bibiane, ed. (1997). Ecrire en français en Belgique et au Congo. Congo-Meuse (in French). Mbuji-Mayi: Centre d'études des littératures belge et congolaise de langue française. OCLC 428028595.
- Weinstein, Warren (1976). Historical Dictionary of Burundi. Metuchen: Scarecrow Press. ISBN 9780810809628.
