= Pierre Ngendandumwe =

Burundian politician

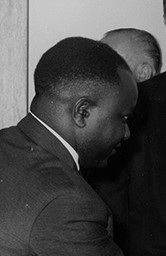

4th Prime Minister of Burundi
- In office 7 January 1965 – 15 January 1965
- Preceded by: Albin Nyamoya
- Succeeded by: Pié Masumbuko
- In office 18 June 1963 – 6 April 1964
- Monarch: Mwambutsa IV
- Preceded by: André Muhirwa
- Succeeded by: Albin Nyamoya

Personal details
- Born: 1930 Ngozi Province, Ruanda-Urundi
- Died: 15 January 1965 (aged 34–35) Bujumbura, Kingdom of Burundi
- Cause of death: Assassination
- Party: Union for National Progress

Pierre Ngendandumwe (1930 – 15 January 1965) was a Burundian politician and statesman who served as the Prime Minister of Burundi in two terms, first from 1963 to 1964 and second for only eight days in January 1965.

An ethnic Hutu, he was a member of the Union for National Progress political party. On 18 June 1963, about a year after Burundi gained independence and amidst efforts to bring about political cooperation between Hutus and the dominant minority Tutsis, Ngendandumwe became Burundi's first Hutu prime minister. He served as prime minister until 6 April 1964 and then became prime minister again on 7 January 1965, serving until his death. Eight days after beginning his second term, he was assassinated by a Rwandan Tutsi refugee.

== Early life ==
Pierre Ngendandumwe was born in 1930 in Ngozi Province, Burundi. He came from a prosperous Hutu family. In 1959, he earned a degree in political science from Lovanium University in the Belgian Congo. That year, he bemoaned the domination of Burundi's administration by the Tutsi minority ethnic group.

== Career ==
Following the completion of his education, Ngendandumwe worked in the Belgian colonial administration as an assistant territorial administrator. He supported Prince Louis Rwagasore and was a member of his political party, the Union for National Progress (UPRONA). In July 1961 he was appointed Minister of Finance in the caretaker of government of national union assembled by the Belgian administration. National elections were held and won by UPRONA; Ngendandumwe became the only member of the Legislative Assembly to hold a university degree.

The Legislative Assembly met on 28 September to invest a new government with Rwagasore acting as formateur. In a secret ballot, most deputies expressed their desire for Rwagasore to become the new prime minister, though two indicated their preference for Ngendandumwe. Rwagasore ultimately became prime minister with Ngendandumwe serving as Vice Prime Minister and Minister of Finance. On 13 October Rwagasore was assassinated. André Muhirwa was named Prime Minister to replace him, while Ngendandumwe continued to serve as Vice Prime Minister. (Note: The Legislative Assembly had indicated to the Mwami that it preferred Muhirwa for the premiership at the time over Ngendandumwe. Ngendandumwe initially thought that Muhirwa's appointment was done as consolation to the Mwami since he was a member of the royal family, but in time came to believe this was part of a strategy to exclude Hutus from national leadership.) Upon the death of Rwagasore, UPRONA developed two factions which became known as the "Casablanca group" and the "Monrovia group". The former was dominated by Tutsis and anti-Western in its ideological orientation. The latter was led by Hutus and leaned either pro-West or was neutral towards it. Ngendandumwe was associated with the Monrovia group.

In December Belgian Foreign Minister Paul-Henri Spaak summoned Rwandan and Burundian representatives to Brussels to discuss the future of their territory. Ngendandumwe led the Burundian delegation. He signed an agreement with Spaak, guaranteeing Burundi internal autonomy in most matters until independence. On 18 January 1962 he and the President of the Legislative Assembly of Ruanda appealed to the United Nations General Assembly to permit the independence of Ruanda-Urundi as two separate states. He served as part of a Burundian delegation sent to the United Nations Headquarters in February to finalise the terms of Burundi's independence. The National Assembly appointed him to the Mwami Mwambutsa IV's Crown Council on 22 May 1963.

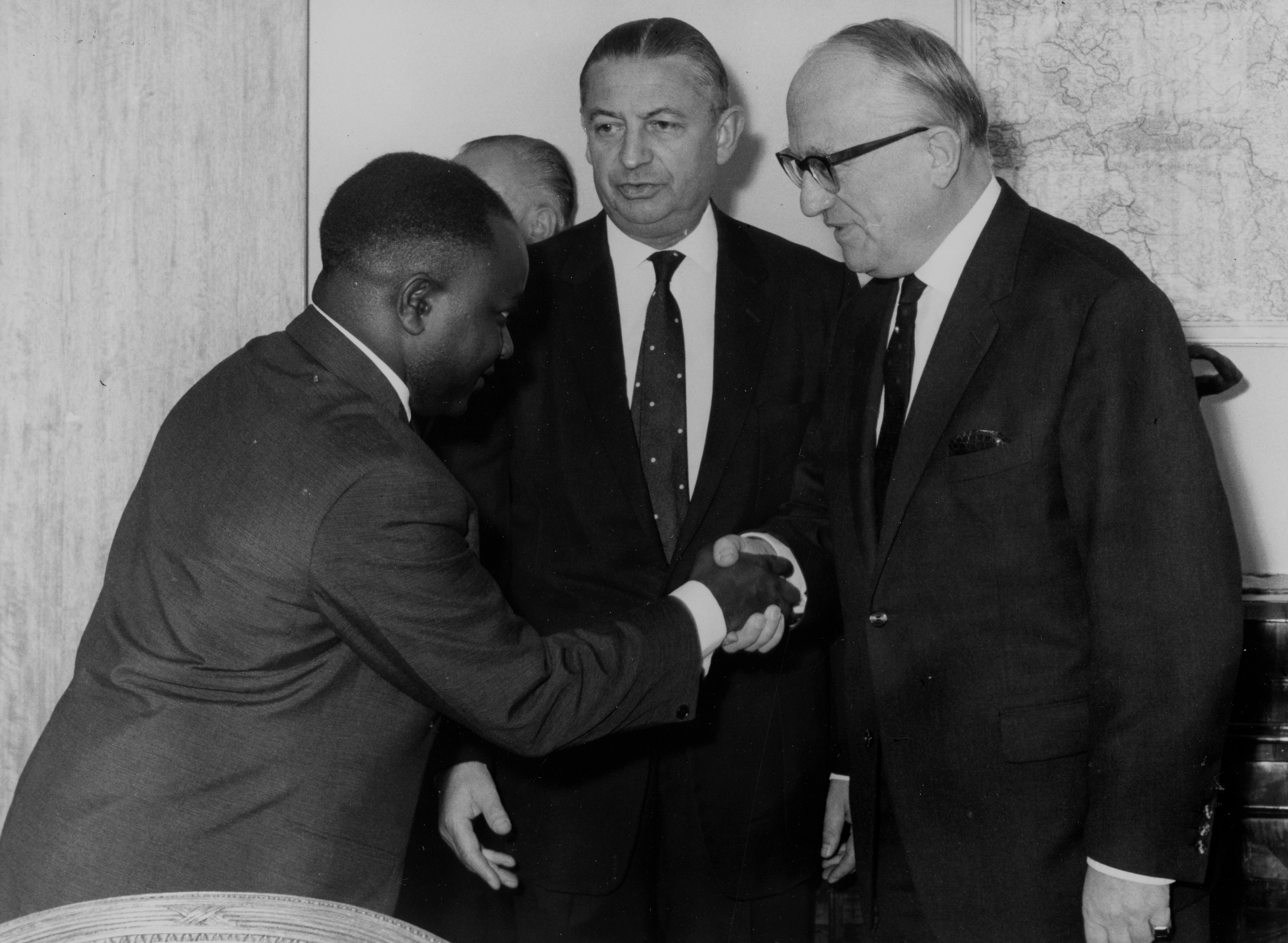
Ngendandumwe meeting with European Commission members, July 1963

Muhirwa's government, facing increasing opposition in the Assembly and from the crown, resigned in early June 1963. The Mwami asked Ngendandumwe to form a new government on 11 June. He became Prime Minister of Burundi on 18 June 1963, the first Hutu to hold the office. Of the 12 ministers in his new government, Ngendandumwe was the only parliamentarian; the other members were largely apolitical technocrats. Upon swearing in he announced a programme for "bread and peace", including an initiative to preserve coffee trees and an appeal to all citizens to provide two days of free labor to the country to bolster the state treasury. From this point onward the Mwami exerted considerable control over Burundian politics and made the cabinet responsible to him instead of Parliament. On 29 July he traveled to Brussels and signed several technical assistance and financial agreements with the Belgian government, including a loan of 65 million Belgian francs for economic development, subsidies for Burundian students at Belgian universities, and grantees of co-operation between Belgian and Burundian civil servants.

In early 1964 Ngendandumwe went on a regional tour, visiting Kenya, Uganda, and Tanganyika to explore the possibility of Burundi joining the East African Common Services Organization and eventually a proposed East African Federation. He also established diplomatic relations with the People's Republic of China, upsetting the Mwami. On 31 March 1964 the Mwami dismissed four controversial cabinet members and asked Ngendandumwe to create a new government. A settlement was not reached and Ngendandumwe resigned on 6 April 1964. He was replaced by Albin Nyamoya. Despite this, he accompanied the Mwami to the United States in May to meet with President Lyndon B. Johnson.

== Assassination ==
On 7 January 1965, Mwambutsa called on Ngendandumwe to replace Nyamoya and form a new government. The appointment was protested by the Tutsi-dominated Rwagasore National Youth, the Federation of Burundian Workers, and the Union of Administration Agents. At noon on 15 January his new government was announced. Later that day he visited his wife at a hospital in Bujumbura to watch her give birth to their son. At about 8:00 PM, as he was leaving the hospital, he was shot in the back and killed. His death was reportedly instantaneous, while one of his aides was wounded by a stray bullet.

=== Aftermath ===
His funeral was held three days later and he was succeeded in office by acting Prime Minister Pié Masumbuko. Ngendandumwe was the second Burundian premier to have been assassinated. His death created a political crisis, prompting Mwambutsa to dissolve Parliament and call for new elections. The Hutu-dominated Party of the People (PP), bolstered by UPRONA defections, saw a political opportunity and billed itself as a champion of the Monrovia group's ideas, renaming its youth wing the Jeunesse Populaire Ngendandumwe. (Note: The group was also known as the Jeunesse Mirerekano, after Hutu leader Paul Mirerekano.) UPRONA loyalist civil servants denounced the youth organisation as a group founded to "avenge" the late prime minister. UPRONA maintained its majority in the elections, but the PP earned 10 seats in Parliament.

"Ngendandumwe's assassination was both an act of revenge and an act of solidarity—an act of revenge against the crown, and the expression of a growing solidarity between the Casablanca elites and the [Rwandan] refugee leadership."

— Political scientist René Lemarchand, 1970

The man accused of killing Ngendandumwe was Gonzalve Muyenzi, a Rwandan refugee who worked at the United States Embassy. Shortly after the murder several Rwandan refugees were arrested, including most of the leaders of the Armée Populaire de Libération Rwandaise. The Burundian government also severed relations with China, but in March a Burundian diplomat declared that his government believed that both the United States and China were not involved in the killing. The police detained a man named Butera, another employee at the United States Embassy and the son of François Rukeba, a prominent Rwandan exile rebel leader. A ballistics expert alleged that the bullet which killed Ngendandumwe had been traced to a gun found in the possession of Butera. Also arrested were leading figures of the Casablanca group, including Nyamoa, Prime Niyongabo, and Zenon Nicanyenzi. The group had convened shortly before the murder and were accused of plotting it. Despite the arrests and several investigations, no members of the Casablanca group were ever prosecuted. In December 1967 the Supreme Court of Burundi, citing lack of evidence, dismissed all charges against those accused in the murder. The lack of a conviction for the murder became a grievance for Hutu opposition politicians.

Ngendandumwe was buried in the Vugizo area of Bujumbura, next to the tomb of Rwagasore. On 26 January 1965 the government voted to rename the Avenue de Hospital in Bujumbura—where he had been shot—as Avenue Pierre Ngendandumwe. The anniversary of Ngendandumwe's death in 1966 was declared a public holiday. He was also officially declared a "national hero" like Rwagasore, but his status in Burundian collective memory never became as prominent as that of the prince. In 2019, the Burundian government announced that it would name the planned building for the Senate in Gitega after Ngendandumwe.

== Works cited ==
- Année Africaine 1965 (in French). Paris: Éditions A. Pedone. 1967. OCLC 929702844.
- Banshimiyubusa, Denis (2018). Les enjeux et défis de la démocratisation au Burundi. Essai d'analyse et d'interprétation à partir des partis politiques (PDF) (PhD thesis) (in French). Université Pau et des Pays de l'Adour. OCLC 1085890695.
- "Le Burundi a la Recherche d'Une Stabilite". Présence Africaine (in French) (47): 235–241. 1963. JSTOR 24348312.
- Carbone, Carlo (March 2000). "Nazione, Nazionalisti, Decolonizzazione in Burundi 1958-1963". Africa: Rivista trimestrale di studi e documentazione dell'Istituto italiano per l'Africa e l'Oriente (in Italian). 55 (1): 1–52. JSTOR 40761428.
- Deslaurier, Christine (2013). "Rwagasore for ever? Des usages contemporains d'un héros consensuel au Burundi". Vingtième Siècle Revue d'histoire (in French). Vol. 2, no. 118. pp. 15–30.
- De Witte, Ludo (2021). Meurtre Au Burundi : La Belgique et l'assassinat de Rwagasore (in French). Editions IWACU, Investig' Action. ISBN 978-2-930827-87-2.
- Eggers, Ellen K. (2006). Historical Dictionary of Burundi (third ed.). Lanham: Scarecrow Press. ISBN 978-0-8108-5302-7.
- Latham-Koenig, A. L. (March 1964). "Notes of the Month: Attempted genocide in Ruanda". The World Today. 20 (3): 97–100. JSTOR 40393588.
- Lemarchand, René (1970). Rwanda and Burundi. New York: Praeger Publishers. OCLC 254366212.
- Russell, Aiden (2019). Politics and Violence in Burundi: The Language of Truth in an Emerging State. Cambridge University Press. ISBN 9781108499347.
- Weinstein, Warren (1976). Historical Dictionary of Burundi. Metuchen: Scarecrow Press. ISBN 9780810809628.

Political offices
Preceded by André Muhirwa	Prime Minister of Burundi; 1963–1964	Succeeded by Albin Nyamoya
Preceded by Albin Nyamoya	Prime Minister of Burundi; 1965	Succeeded by Pié Masumbuko
