= Groupe Scolaire Officiel de Butare =

Secondary school in Huye District, Butare

The Groupe Scolaire Officiel de Butare (GSOB) Indatwa n’inkesha, also known as the Indatwa n'Inkesha School, is a historic secondary school in Huye District in Butare (formerly Astrida), Rwanda. As well as being the oldest secondary school in the country, it is regarded as one of the most prestigious and successful public schools in Rwanda.

The school, originally known as the Groupe Scolaire d'Astrida, was established by the Brothers of Charity in 1929. It was intended to educate students who would form an élite to serve as chiefs and medical, agricultural, and veterinary assistants in the Belgian mandatory administration in Ruanda-Urundi. It took students, often the children of chiefs and other dignitaries, from both modern-day Rwanda and Burundi. Between 1932 and 1957, the Groupe Scolaire d'Astrida admitted 964 students from Rwanda including 739 ethnic Tutsi and 177 ethnic Hutu. At the time, the only comparable educational institution in the mandate was the Nyakibanda Major Seminary (Grand Séminaire de Nyakibanda) which also educated some students not destined for the priesthood after its foundation in 1936.

After independence, the school was renamed the Groupe Scolaire de Butare. This school is regarded as one of the most selective schools in Rwanda. In 2004 President of Rwanda Paul Kagame visited the school to celebrate its 75th anniversary and thank the Brothers of Charity. In 2012 the school celebrated its 83rd anniversary.

== Notable students ==
- King Kigeli V Ndahindurwa of Rwanda
- Louis Rwagasore, Prince of Burundi
- Melchior Ndadaye, Assassinated President of Burundi
- Joseph Cimpaye, Burundian politician and writer
- Pascal Bubiriza, Burundian ambassador

== See also ==
- King's College Budo, a comparable institution in Uganda
