= Party of the People (Burundi) =

The Party of the People (French: Parti du Peuple, PP) was a Hutu political party in Burundi.

== History ==
The PP was established in 1959 following events in neighbouring Rwanda. It contested the 1961 parliamentary elections as part of the Common Front alliance, alongside the Christian Democratic Party, the Democratic and Rural Party, the People's Emancipation Party, the Murundi People's Voice and several other minor parties. The alliance won six seats, of which the PP took four, but was heavily beaten by the Union for National Progress (UPRONA), which won 58 seats. Following UPRONA's victory, party activist Albert Maus committed suicide upon learning the election results. Party member Basile Ntawumenyakarizi was killed in the Kamenge incidents of January 1962, whilst party secretary Jean Ndukwabike was killed later in the year. Several other party members were threatened or beaten, including party president Joachim Baribwegure and Jean Kandeke.

The party contested the 1965 parliamentary elections alone, winning 10 seats in the National Assembly and none in the Senate, whilst UPRONA won 21 seats in the National Assembly and 12 in the Senate.
