= 1961 Burundian parliamentary election =

- 18 September 1961
- All 64 seats in the National Assembly; 33 seats needed for a majority
- Turnout: 75.39%
Party	Leader	Vote %	Seats
UPRONA	Louis Rwagasore	80.97	58
Common Front	Jean-Baptiste Ntidendereza	17.86	6
This lists parties that won seats. See the complete results below.
Prime Minister before	Prime Minister after
Joseph Cimpaye; UPP	Louis Rwagasore; UPRONA

Parliamentary elections were held in Burundi on 18 September 1961 to elect all 64 members of the National Assembly and a government to lead the country following its independence from Belgium in 1962. With 75% voter turnout, the elections resulted in a victory for the Union for National Progress (UPRONA) led by Louis Rwagasore, which received over 80% of the vote and won 58 seats. Rwagasore became prime minister in the new government, but he was assassinated two weeks after the elections.

== Results ==
Party	Votes	%	Seats
Union for National Progress	627,453	80.97	58
Common Front (Note: The Party of the People won four of the six seats, with the Christian Democratic Party taking the remaining two.)	138,406	17.86	6
Association of the Middle Classes, Clerks, and Intellectuals	3,470	0.45	0
Union of People's Parties	2,452	0.32	0
African National Union of Ruanda-Urundi	1,641	0.21	0
Burundi People	1,461	0.19	0
Total	774,883	100.00	64
Valid votes	774,883	98.96	
Invalid/blank votes	8,144	1.04	
Total votes	783,027	100.00	
Registered voters/turnout	1,038,653	75.39	
Source: African Elections Database
