= Mwami =

Honorific title for chief or king in several parts of Central or East Africa

Mwami (pronounced [mwɑmi, mŋɑmi]) is an honorific title common in parts of Central and East Africa. The title means King, chief or tribal chief in several Bantu languages. It was historically used by kings in several African nations, and is still used for traditional kings or rulers of regions within several African nation-states, for example, in ancient Bushi Kingdom and Rwanda.

== Tribal chief ==
In several Bantu languages − including Kirundi, Kinyarwanda, Fuliiru, Nande, Lega, Luhya, Nyindu, Shi, and Chitonga − the word mwami means "tribal chief". It is used as a title for the leader of tribal societies or chiefdoms in areas where those languages are spoken.

In addition, mwami means either "chief" or "husband" in Luganda. It is used as a title for administrative chief in Luganda-speaking chiefdoms around the African Great Lakes region, though it can also be used as a general honorific for men, similar to English Mr.

Traditional chiefs of the Lenje and the Ila people of Zambia, and the Tonga people of Zambia and Zimbabwe also use the honorific.

== Etymology ==
Mwami comes from the Proto-Bantu word "mʊ̀jámí" which meant chief, master, or king.

== King ==
In the Kingdom of Rwanda, the King of Rwanda was known as mwami (plural abami). Since 1961, the nation has been led by the president of Rwanda.

The Kingdom of Burundi was ruled by kings titled mwami, followed by one of four regnal names (Ntare, Mwezi, Mutaga, Mwambutsa) that followed a repeating cycle. The President of Burundi has ruled since the start of the republic in 1966.

As of 2020 the current Buha Kingdom in the Kigoma Region of Western Tanzania is led by a regional mwami.

Traditional kingdoms in the North Kivu, South Kivu, and Maniema provinces in the Democratic Republic of the Congo call their traditional leaders mwami.

The Luhya people of Western Kenya refer to their supreme ruler as Mwami.
