= Ganwa =

Ethnic group in Burundi

Ganwa is the name for the princely group that traditionally ruled Burundi. They formed a distinct social class that was neither Hutu nor Tutsi, although they were affiliated with the latter. They have launched several appeals to be recognized as a distinct socio-cultural grouping.

== Origins ==
Burundi's Ganwa dynasty were not from the Hima stock, as was the case for the Nyiginya dynasty of Rwanda.

The White Father Bernard Zuure reported that the first king of Burundi (Rufuku, father of Ntare) was a Hutu: "Everybody here says so, and the princes themselves told me they do not descend from a Tutsi". The Ganwa kings of Burundi did not like to be called Tutsi because the Tutsi were associated with the Hima, who were despised.
