= Ndungutse's rebellion =

1912 conflict in Rwanda

Date	January–May 1912
Location	Northern Rwanda
Result	Victory of Germany and the Rwandan monarchy

Belligerents
German Empire: Kingdom of Rwanda; German East Africa	Ndungutse's coalition

Commanders and leaders
Yuhi V Musinga; Kanjogera; Eberhard Gudowius; Rwubusisi	Ndungutse (MIA); Rukara (executed); Basebya (executed)

Units involved
Rwandan royal army: Indengabaganizi; Inkemba; Schutztruppe: 11th Company	Ndungutse's followers Rukara's Hutu rebels Basebya's Basengo and Ibijabura

Strength
c. 3,000 warriors 60 German askari 30 policemen	Thousands

Casualties and losses
Unknown	Heavy
- Many civilians killed in reprisals and a related famine

In 1912, a coalition of various opposition groups rebelled against the Kingdom of Rwanda and aligned German colonial forces. The insurgents were headed by Ndungutse, an individual who claimed to be the rightful king of Rwanda, and consisted of peasants, separatists, adherents of a rival royal lineage, anti-colonial rebels, and bandits. Initially, Ndungutse's coalition garned much support across the kingdom and seized control of a substantial territory from January 1912, while the Germans were unsure about how to react to the uprising as it was mainly aimed at overthrowing their ally King Yuhi V Musinga of Rwanda instead of directly targeting Europeans. As a result, the German commander Eberhard Gudowius initially prevented a counteroffensive by Yuhi's followers and instead enforced a de facto ceasefire.

In April 1912, open hostilities resumed as the Germans finally opted to aid Yuhi V in eliminating the insurgents. The German-led campaign crushed the opposition forces by May after heavy fighting, resulting in widespread destruction, looting, death, and hunger in the region. The rebel leaders were either captured and executed or disappeared. The 1912 campaign contributed to the centralization of Rwanda, strengthening the local monarchy at the expense of previously autonomous northern communities.

== Background ==
=== Ascension of Yuhi V of Rwanda ===
The Kingdom of Rwanda was an old state located in the African Great Lakes region. An expansionist realm led by a royal family and nobility of Tutsi ethnicity, the kingdom exploited a lower class of Hutu and Twa to fund its wars of conquest. In the 17th and 18th century, the Rwandan monarchs attempted to conquer a number of northern border territories, though faced high resistance. As a result, Rwanda opted for a more indirect expansion in this territory by allying with or vassalizing the local small statelets. Rwanda significantly grew in strength and territory in the 19th century, with King Kigeli IV Rwabugiri in particular conquering a series of smaller kingdoms and principalities. He also strengthened the Rwandan presence in the north by resettling nobles who subsequently displaced parts of the native upper class and exploited the northern Hutu, creating much resentment. Northern resistance efforts against Kigeli IV Rwabugiri often rallied around mediums who claimed to speak for the spirit Nyabinghi whose movement grew increasingly popular in the wider region. Meanwhile, the Berlin Conference assigned Rwanda to the German colonial empire without the Rwandans' knowledge and consent. Regardless, Germany initially did little to establish a lasting presence in Rwanda aside of a few expeditions. Though not particularly approving of the German intruders, the Rwandan elite quickly realized that it could use the European arrivals to its advantage to further cement their own control of the kingdom's Hutu population.

In 1895, Kigeli IV died, passing the throne to his son Mibambwe IV Rutarindwa. Seeing a chance to increase their power, elements of the nobility plotted against the new ruler. In late 1896, a faction at the royal court overthrew and murdered King Mibambwe IV in the Rucunshu Coup. Afterward, Queen Mother Kanjogera enforced the enthronement of her own son by Kigeli IV, namely Yuhi V Musinga. As a result of the circumstances of his rise to power, Yuhi V was largely backed by Kanjogera's relatives –the Bega or Ega clan– and seen as an illegitimate usurper by many other nobles. His regime was popularly dubbed Cyiimyamaboko ("It is force that rules"), and would keep this monicker for more than 15 years despite propaganda efforts by Yuhi's supporters. Conversely, Rwanda saw the arrival and establishment of a German colonial administration around this time. Impressed by the Rwandan royal court and its seemingly tight grip on power, the Germans opted for an indirect rule through Yuhi V, meaning that they secured his position while he assisted their overlordship. This system worked to the benefit of the two sides, but marginalized nobles and other groups opposed to the monarch.

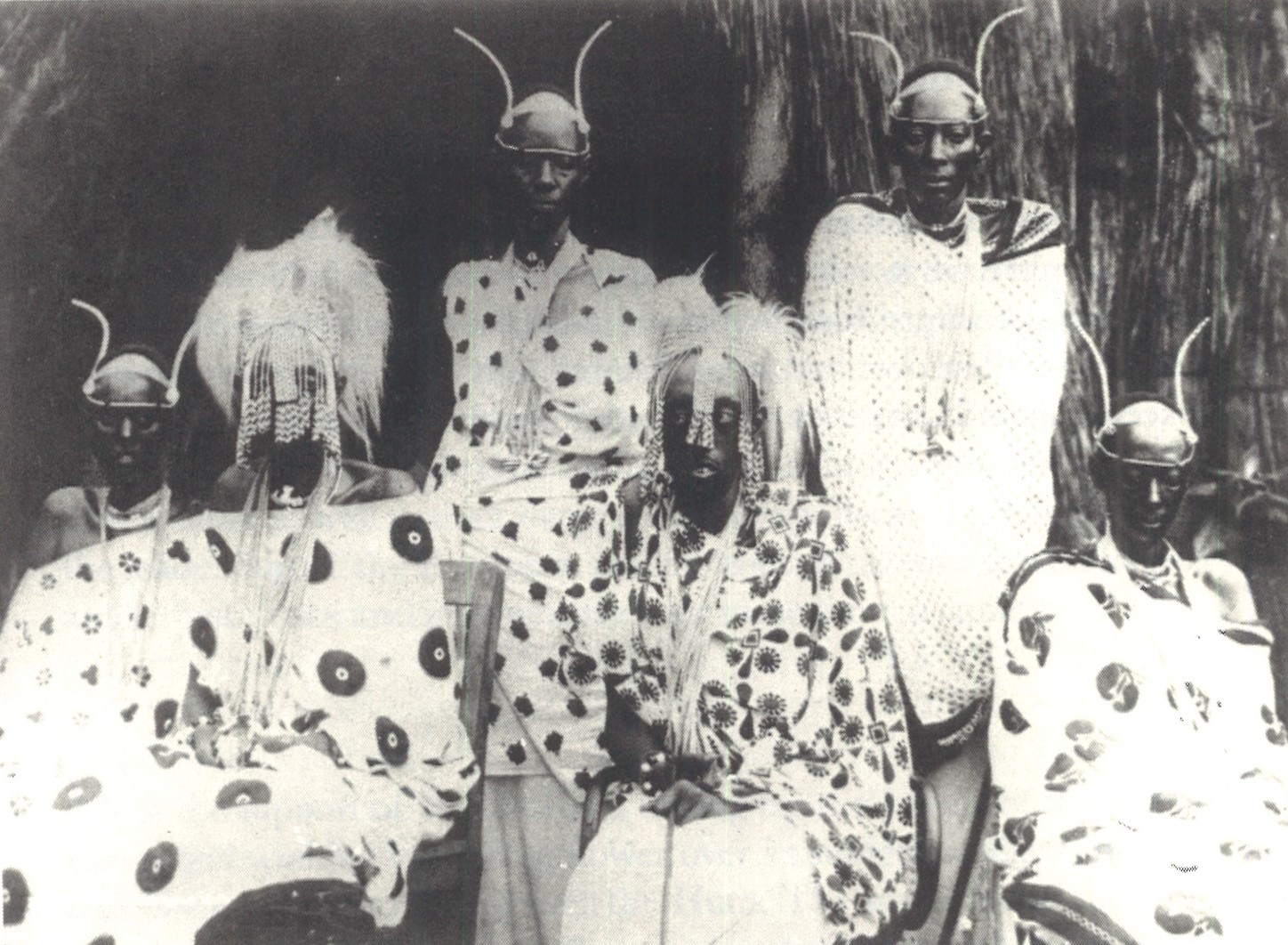
Yuhi V Musinga (center, seated) and his mother Kanjogera (2nd from left, seated) among other royal family members.

As the German support allowed Yuhi V to cement his control over the court, the opposition to his reign moved to northern Rwanda. Never fully pacified to begin with, this part of the kingdom had been partially overrun by rebels after Kigeli IV Rwabugiri's death and remained largely autonomous. One of those who moved to the north was Basebya, a warrior who had previously served as a bodyguard of Mibambwe IV Rutarindwa and led a contingent of Twa warriors. Disgusted over the Rucunshu Coup, he and his followers relocated to the Rugezi Marsh where they became bandits, raiding the surrounding lands. Basebya proved to be a skillful tactician who evaded royal punitive expeditions and gradually grew his forces. Other opposition members were sheltered by the traditional Hutu rulers of the northern territories, hoping to use the anti-Yuhi forces as allies to further increase their freedom from the court. For a time, a northern resistance movement was led by Muserekande, another widow of Kigeli IV Rwabugiri who tried to claim the throne for her own son. Muserekande and her son were ultimately defeated and killed by Kanjogera's forces, but many believed that she had actually survived and fled into exile. After defeating the most extensive revolts, the Rwandan court under Kanjogera used their German allies to increase their control over the north. This region began to particularly suffer under the dual royalist-colonial system, as the royal notables and nobles could increase their exploitation while calling on the Germans to violently crush any resistance. Thus, they were no longer reliant on cooperating with the old northern elites and instead imposed more state control, higher taxes, and various manpower demands (for warriors and workers). The Germans and the newly arrived White Fathers, an influential order of Christian missionaries, also tried to implement new levies and taxes, furthering the northern resentment. Resentful northerners resisted through banditry or by retreating into more remote areas, with many joining Basebya's followship.

Meanwhile, Kanjogera and her allies continued their attempts to cement their position by also purging potential rivals at the court. One of these was Rukara, head of the powerful Hutu-Barashi clan and royal provincial governor in the northeastern kingdom. Though a loyal follower of Kigeli IV, he fell from favor after the Rucunshu Coup, clashing with other notables and insulting Kanjogera at one point. Furthermore, the new German authorities distrusted him after he swore a blood feud against Europeans after Belgian soldiers of the Congo Free State killed his father in 1901. Eventually, Rukara was imprisoned at the royal court, but set free after he agreed to assist a scientific expedition of Jan Czekanowski in 1908.

=== Growing tensions in northern Rwanda ===
After returning to northern Rwanda, Rukara increasingly opposed the Rwandan royal government and attempted to turn the province of Mulera into an independent kingdom. He dubbed his own base "Nyanza" after the royal capital, scorned and insulted the rule of Yuhi V, and started to act like a king. Though the local German representatives such as Resident Richard Kandt generally favored the royal court in this dispute, they initially tolerated Rukara's activities due to harboring some sympathy for his viewpoints. Conversely, Rukara came under growing pressure from both the court for his resistance but also from among his clan due to his authoritarianism. The dissatisfied Barashi rallied around his cousin Sebuyange who represented a "more customary" leadership style, rapprochement with the court, and more cooperation with the Europeans. To gain more support for his own actions, Rukara turned to the White Fathers who tried to remain neutral. He met with the White Fathers' station head in Rwaza, Paulin Loupias, who angrily rebuffed the intervention requests and even slapped Rukara's face during one heated argument. On 1 April 1910, Rukara again attempted to convince Loupias to take his side, but the dispute again went badly. According to researcher Helmut Strizek, the missionary seemingly raised his hand to slap the Hutu chief a second time, whereupon his furious warriors killed Loupias. Historian Alison Des Forges stated that Loupias held a rifle with one hand and grabbed Rukara's wrist with the other, whereupon the chief asked for aid from his followers who killed the White Father. Either way, the incident was described by another missionary as the result of escalated self-defense, but many northerners perceived Loupias' murder as an act of anti-colonial resistance.

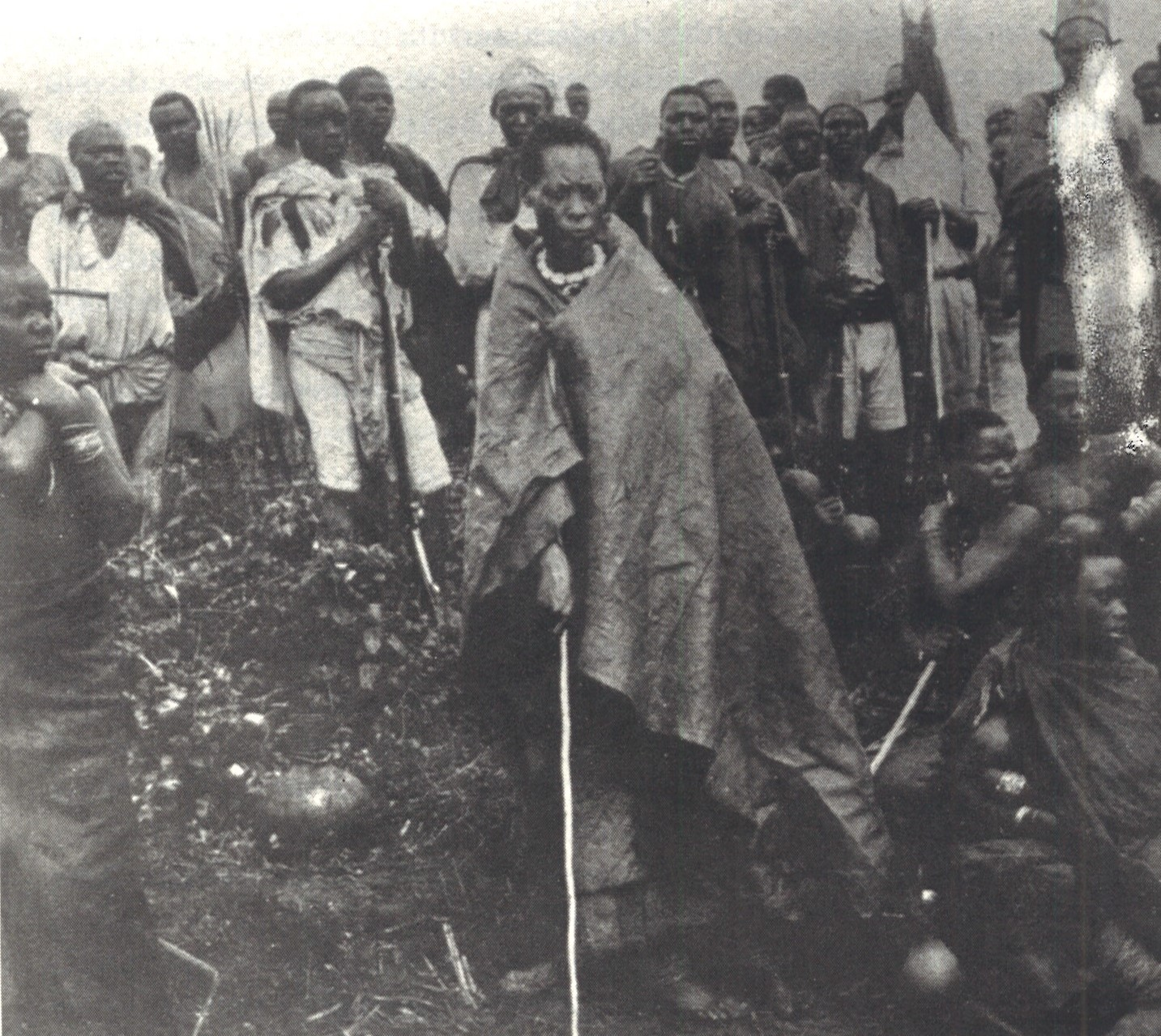
The 1912 rebellion in Rwanda was partially inspired by a previous uprising led by Muhumusa (center, with staff).

The German colonial administration could not tolerate the murder of a White Father in their territory, and thus Rukara was deemed a rebel. The Schutztruppe colonial military immediately sent a punitive expedition, though it failed to catch the Hutu chief. Seeing no other option, Rukara subsequently joined the militant resistance in northern Rwanda. At this point, an uprising was developing in the border region. In 1911, a spiritual leader named Muhumusa was organizing an anti-colonial movement at Mpororo in British Uganda. (Note: Muhumusa's origins are unclear. She was already active in northern Rwanda by 1903, at the time reportedly claiming to be a widow of Kigeli IV Rwabugiri and seeking to put her son "Biregeya" on the Rwandan throne. The European authorities in the region, both German and British, mainly regarded her as a troublemaker. In 1907, she clashed with a British border commission.) One of the famous Nyabinghi mediums, she claimed to have been a widow of Kigeli IV or Mibambwe IV, possibly posing as the disappeared Muserekande to add a form of royalist legitimacy to her spiritualist reputation. She was aided by two lieutenants, namely Ndungutse and Basebya. At this point, Basebya had established his own fiefdom in the Rugezi Marsh and led two regiments of warriors dubbed Basengo (consisting of his clients) and Ibijabura (composed of Twa raiders). Ndungutse was a figure of a much more dubious background who would later claim to be of royal descent; his ethnicity was variously reported as Tutsi, Hima or Hutu, and his birthplace located either in Rwanda or at Mpororo. Kanjogera and Yuhi V suspected that a number of royal court members were supportive of Muhumusa and Basebya; as royal expeditions failed to eliminate them, the Rwandan leadership requested the Germans' aid. Basebya evaded the Germans, while Muhumusa was captured in 1908 and exiled to Bukoba, only to eventually escape detention in July 1911.

Upon her escape, Muhumusa returned to the Rwandan-Ugandan border region, rallying the locals by proclaiming the imminent return of a king, the discovery of royal drums –an important piece of royal regalia in the region–, and promising the distribution of cows. Muhumusa's forces were eventually defeated by a joint German-British operation in September 1911. She was imprisoned and exiled to Kampala, where she stayed until her eventual death. With news of her downfall spreading slowly, many northern Rwandans continued to believe that her rebellion was gaining traction and would soon spread to their land to expel the Europeans. Meanwhile, Ndungutse and Basebya had survived the defeat of their superior and relocated to the Rugezi Marsh, where they continued their operations and reignited the armed opposition.

== Prelude ==
To continue his movement, Ndungutse started to claim to have not just been Muhumusa's lieutenant but to be her son. By extension, this would have made him the son of a Rwandan king –either Kigeli IV or Mibambwe IV– and he began to style himself as the rightful ruler of Rwanda, opposing the usurper Yuhi V. To garner the sympathy of the Bakiga-Hutu in the region, Ndungutse also claimed that he would expel the unjust tax official and encouraged the people to disobey the unpopular uburetwa; the uburetwa was a corvée system in which Hutu were forced to work for Tutsi chiefs. In this way, Ndungutse became popular among Hutu as he championed their interests and promised social changes, while attracting the support of royalists who had opposed the Rucunshu Coup and the ruling clique of the Bega. By promising to continue Muhumusa's efforts and emphasizing his connections with Basebya, Ndungutse gained Twa followers as well. Furthermore, he claimed to possess supernatural powers, alluding to the Nyabinghi movement of Muhumusa and other famous figures of the past. Some northerners framed him as a kind of messiah, a "saviour king" or the minister (kisongo) who heralded the coming of Nyabinghi. In accordance to these supernatural beliefs, Ndungutse was rumored to be invulnerable and to be capable of bewitching his enemies as well as turning enemy bullets into water.

According to researcher Helmut Strizek, Ndungutse's claim to be a Rwandan prince is generally regarded as doubtful by modern historians, whereas researcher Mahmood Mamdani described him as "accepted by most authorities as a son of Muhumusa and Rwabugiri". Either way, the rebel's royal descent was widely believed by 1911/12. Ndungutse set up a court and used traditional royal regalia. His alleged descent garnered him the greatest support in former royalist strongholds like Buberuka, Bumbogo, Busigi, and Buriza. When Rukara eventually met the claimant in January 1912, he reportedly insulted Ndungutse and called him a false pretender. Regardless, the Hutu chief opted to join Ndungutse's forces, as he was still hunted by the Germans and had few other options left. Ndungutse ignored the chief's previous insults due to his substantial influence and the potential benefits of cooperation. With his anti-tax populist rhetoric and Rukara's assistance, Ndungutse also gained a following in Mulera, Bukonya, Buhoma, and Bushiru where the Rwandan monarchy was viewed more negatively. Despite his alliance with anti-colonial figures and connections to Muhumusa's anti-colonial movement, Ndungutse even attempted to present himself as a valid ally to the Europeans, offering the White Fathers and Germans gifts to gain their acceptance, albeit unsuccessfully. In this way, he did not just try to placate the Europeans, but also Christian Rwandans of whom there were over 3,800 in the north.

Overall, many of Ndungutse's promises were contradictory; his pledges to the Hutu were opposed to the expectations by Tutsi nobles, his support for Basebya's Twa raiders was disdained by the peasants, and his conciliatory attitude toward Europeans was disappointing to his anti-colonial followers. However, his supporters generally chose to view any measures whom they disapproved of as "temporary", implemented by Ndungutse merely for the duration of his initial campaign; they believed that he would fully support their interests once he had taken control of Rwanda. According to researchers Ian and Jane Linden, Ndungutse proved to have an "exceptional ability to respond to the demands of the disparate northern groups". Furthermore, Des Forges argued that, "while people differed on why they believed Ndungutse legitimate, they generally agreed on why [Yuhi V] Musinga was illegitimate. Everyone knew he had usurped power [...]", had failed to contain the Twa raiders, had not restricted the Europeans, and had not protected the people from exploitation by notables.

== Campaign ==
=== Ndungutse's expansion and German stalling ===
We love Ndungutse and he loves us. If you could only see how fine he is! You cannot look at him without feeling tears come to your eyes.

— One of Ndungutse's supporters in a conversation with a missionary

In late January 1912, Ndungutse began to organize violent attacks on his opponents. His first militant operation was aimed at the Tsobe clan of the Tutsi around Rulindo in Busigi Province. The Tsobe had sanctioned the Rucunshu Coup, and Ndungutse also declared to his Hutu followers that they would be henceforth be free of the Tsobe's taxes. This operation destroyed the clan's local presence, with the Tsobe villages being wiped out. The success of this attack inspired more support for the royal claimant across the region, with thousands rallying to his cause. Ndungutse then continued to expand his territory of control and influence, becoming widely popular among Hutu. He was often greeted with gifts and celebrations when he travelled. His followers focused their next attacks on members of the Bega and Batsobe lineages, as these had been major supporters of the Rucunshu Coup and also assisted the expansion of royal control over northern Rwanda. As Bega and Batsobe notables fled southward, Yuhi V grew increasingly concerned over the growing power of Ndungutse, especially as some at his own court began to display sympathy for the latter's "legitimist" cause. About a dozen court members made contacts with the rebel leader, reinforcing his belief that he could actually win the throne from the unpopular, Bega-supported Yuhi V.

Feeling betrayed by the former supporters of his father, Yuhi V relied even more on the Bega nobles to rally his loyalists and reinforce his reign. As part of these efforts, he relied on diviners for spiritual aid whio informed him that the unrest was rooted in the anger of two of his dead brothers, Karara and Burabyo, who had been murdered in the coup. The monarch thus initiated a programme to placate their spirits. In addition, he mustered the best-trained royal army ngabo (regiments) –including the Indengabaganizi royal guard– to launch an offensive against the northern rebels. To assist in this operation, Yuhi V and his mother Kanjogera requested German support. At the time, Resident Kandt was absent, and his deputy Leutnant Eberhard Gudowius was thus left to decide about an intervention. Unlike Kandt, Gudowius was not very interested in the court's politics and initially contemplated siding with Ndungutse, as the lieutenant believed that the rebel might be more easily influenced than Yuhi V as well as be a genuine, legitimist prince due to his widespread popularity. Furthermore, Gudowius was also unsure over the rebel's actual attitude toward the German colonial rule due to his contradictory actions and statements. For the time being, the officer thus rejected Yuhi V's demands for a counter-insurgency operation. At first, he sent just 15 askari and one police officer to "halt" Ndungutse's advance on Kigali. Later, the Germans set up four military camps around Ndungutse's territory to contain the uprising and enforce a de facto ceasefire, demanded most of the Rwandan royal army to demobilize, and then just waited. The Rwandan king was unsettled over this development, as he worried that Gudowius' stalling hinted at the Europeans pondering over supporting Ndungutse. At the same time, Yuhi V's forces could not go on the offensive against the rebels and started to suffer on low morale, as their leader's impotence in the face of the Germans became apparent.

By late February, a royal drummaker had reportedly sent Ndungutse a drum in recognition of his position. At the peak of his power he held the lands between the lakes Ruhondo and Bulera as well as the Rugezi Marsh. To the south, his forces had expanded to the road between Kigali and Ruhengeri, and his followers had organized raids near Kigali itself. The Yoka clan and the Tutsi diviners of Bushiru as well as Buhoma had pledged loyalty to him, while the umuhinza (petty king) of Kibali had exploited the chaos to organize an independent rebellion. On 27 February, a group of Hutu killed two German askari, two house servants and three Christian oarsmen on Lake Bulera. Though the attackers were not followers of Ndungutse, this event may have contributed to Gudowius' eventual decision to intervene in the conflict after all. By early March, the rebels completely controlled the provinces of Buberuka, Kibali, and Bumbogo as well as parts of Mulera, Bukonya, and Buriza. Ndungutse organized a new administration in his captured territories. The insurgent areas were generally difficult to access during the wet season.

=== Counter-insurgency and rebel defeat ===
In early April, Gudowius changed his attitude toward Ndungutse for unclear reasons. He informed the Rwandan court that they would finally move against the rebels. The leutnant mustered the Schutztruppe's 11th Company, while the court organized an army of 3,000 warriors led by Bega noble Rwubusisi. Even as the pro-government forces mobilized, Ndungutse surprised them by imprisoning Rukara and handing him over to a German post on 6 or 7 April. The reason for this betrayal remains unclear. Des Forges and Strizek speculated that Ndungutse may have seen the Hutu chief as a possible contender for power or tried to prevent the upcoming counter-insurgency operation by handing over Rukara. Linden and Linden instead regarded this as Ndungutse's final attempt to convince the White Fathers to side with his movement, only for them to shun him due to their general distrust of revolutionaries as well as his connections to "paganism". Regardless of Ndungutse's motives, Gudowius continued with the plan to attack the northern rebels.

On 8 April, the joint German-royal force moved northward in a quick forced march, aiming to launch a surprise assault on Ndungutse's main base. The pro-government army consisted of 60 askari, 30 policemen, and about 3,000 warriors including the inkemba elite troops. They were aided by the White Father who provided the Germans with local intelligence, especially concerning Ndungutse's Twa supporters. When they attacked, the rebels had either been forewarned or quickly rallied. In the following battle, at least 50 insurgents were killed. Ndungutse's fate remained disputed. Gudowius personally shot a man who was later identified by spies as the claimant, but others argued that the insurgent leader had successfully escaped from the battlefield to British-held areas. Either way, Ndungutse did not reappear after this defeat and was presumed dead. In contrast, Basebya managed to retreat from the battlefield and continued his operations. By 13 April, Ndungutse's forces had been shattered.

Resolving to fully secure both the court's control over the north as well as the German colonial regime, Gudowius then opted for a "demonstration campaign" through pro-Ndungutse territories to extinguish the opposition to Yuhi V. The Rwandan ruler eagerly supported this decision, and organized a "traditional raid" as a form of "imperial punitive measures". The joint Rwandan-German army subsequently rampaged from Buberuka to Bushiru, then through Bukonya and Kibari. In the process, they killed, burned and plundered the local communities, with some being targeted due to concerns of disloyalty even though they had not sided with Ndungutse. Only civilians linked to the White Fathers were properly warned and thus could move to safety. One of the White Fathers wrote "the batutsi massacre, are without mercy, half of the population of Bumongo will be destroyed. Groups of women are led away and will become the booty of the great chiefs". The White Fathers unsuccessfully protested at the mass capture of northern women who were brought south to serve as concubines for nobles. The great destruction also impacted the region's agriculture and resulted in a famine which killed many more people.

When a man has a great name, he must expect to die for it.

— Rukara's last words after hearing his death sentence

Meanwhile, Rukara was tried and sentenced to death at Ruhengeri on 18 April, but generally impressed those in attendance with his fearless attitude. On the way to the gallows, a person in the crowd signalled that he had a chance to escape. Though shackled, the Hutu chief promptly grabbed the bayonet of the German askari who held his chain, killed him, and ran. Before he could get away, however, Rukara was shot dead by the other askari. Regardless, Gudowius ordered his men to hang the rebel's corpse as a warning to the local Bakiga-Hutu, but Rukara's last actions instead increased his reputation. Des Forges concluded that "even the followers of the missionaries had to agree that a man who took his own vengeance before death was indeed a man of worth".

By 5 May, the counter-insurgency campaign was largely concluded, and the north mostly pacified. One last pocket of resistance remained in the region's swamps, still controlled by Basebya. The raider was eventually betrayed by one of his followers who informed the court of his hiding place. Rwubusisi then coaxed him out of his stronghold by feiging interest in a peaceful solution and offering to negotiate. When Basebya met with the Bega noble, however, four disguised German askari revealed their guns, seized the rebel, and drove his bodyguards away. Fearing that the Twa leader might escape, Gudovius ordered his execution on the next day, 14 May.

== Aftermath ==
After I arrived at Nyanza, the king of all humanity came before me graciously, offered me different provisions, and said to me, 'Here is your share, O Being with Strange Beard and Hair, Runner of the Forests! No enemy would dare attack us as long as I have you with me. You alone truly inspire fear.'

— Excerpt of the self-deprecatory victory poem composed for Eberhard Gudowius.

Following the insurgents' defeat, the pro-government forces returned to the court at Nyanza to celebrate their victory. Conversely, the celebrations became the source of new tensions due to Yuhi V's resentment over Gudowius. Even though the monarch did award the lieutenant the traditional gifts and honors for a successful military commander, he still despised the officer due to the latter's initial stalling and sympathy for Ndungutse. Thus Yuhi V attempted to exploit Gudowius' lack of knowledge in the courtly traditions to covertly humiliate him: Historically, it was custom for victorious Rwandan warriors to compose Kinyarwanda poems to honor their achievements in battle, but Gudowius was ignorant of the local language and accordingly had to rely on a royal poet for his honor. Yuhi V instructed the poet to compose a self-deprecatory text which declared Gudowius an officer worthy of foreign mercenaries who travelled on a "donkey with all the rashness of a warrior", was given only the most worthless tributes by his enemies, and was ultimately pathetic. After the poem had been told during the celebrations, however, a member of the court revealed its true contents to the German. The angry lieutenant responded by humiliating Yuhi V in turn by forcing him to present his prized cattle before him in public, a traditional move for a Rwandan to acknowledge someone as a superior and patron.

After the rebellion's suppression, the north was subjected to a much tighter control by the Rwandan court, with many territories losing their old autonomy. Many northern Hutu "now fell within the orbit of unscrupulous parvenus", as newly arrived Tutsi nobles carved up the area among themselves. Conversely, some territories like Bushiru, Mulera, and Ndorwa escaped some of the carnage as they were difficult to reach and poor, with the Germans and royal forces not bothering to fully subjugate them; localized resistance continued in these areas.

The end of Ndungutse's insurgency generally demonstrated the military strength of the Germans and thus intimidated the kingdom's Hutu population into accepting the European-backed system of indirect rule through Yuhi V. The White Fathers also benefitted from the rebellion's defeat, as their Christian followers had largely escaped the punitive campaign and not aided the insurgents. This boosted the White Fathers' reputation among the Tutsi nobility and also among the Germans. Conversely, Hutu emerged disappointed with the White Fathers, with a substantial number of Christian Hutu leaving the kingdom and resettling at Bukoba. In general, the northern population continued to remember and resent the counter-insurgency operation of 1912, particularly the behavior of Rwubusisi's warriors. The royal court again lost control of the north during World War I, when the Germans had to retreat from Rwanda due to an Allied offensive and the notables lost their protectors. Rwanda subsequently under Belgian rule, and the new colonial overlords assisted the court in retaking the north a few years later.

== Analysis and historiography ==
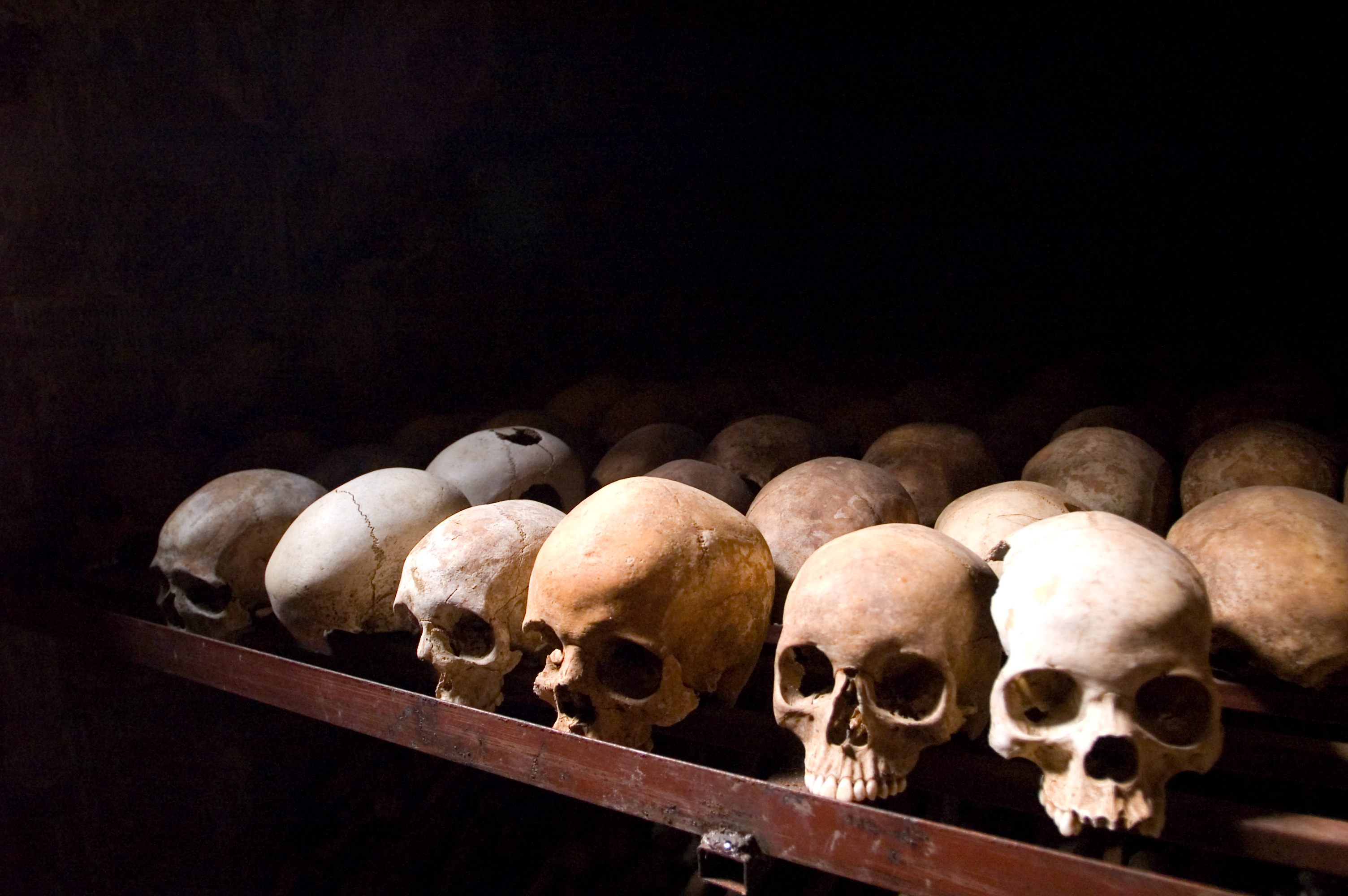
Ossuary at the Nyamata Genocide Memorial Centre. Historians have linked the events of Ndungutse's rebellion to the Rwandan genocide and Rwandan Civil War of the 1990s.

Contemporary observers were unsure on how to categorize Ndungutse's rebellion, either viewing it as a legtimist uprising or a kind of Hutu "revolution". Linden and Linden described Ndungutse –despite his populist rhetoric– as the leader of a "legitimist rebellion which had become intertwined with a wide range of peasant grievances". Mamdani also categorized Ndungutse as a legitimist insurgent. He further described the revolts of Muhumusa and Ndungutse as the "first" and "second phase" of a "protest movement" which emerged after the death of Kigeli IV Rwabugiri, with a "third phase" continuing in the form of a Nyabinghi "possession cult of messianic proportions".

Rwandan historian Ferdinand Nahimana concluded that the 1912 campaign broke the anti-royal resistance in the north and northwest, greatly strengthening the position of Yuhi V. Linden and Linden even concluded that Yuhi V "Musinga's throne had been saved by German might". Conversely, Strizek described the campaign in northern Rwanda as the morally "most questionable" military operation which the Germans carried out to secure the Rwandan monarchy. He speculated that the campaign contributed to Kandt's feeling of dissatisfaction over his performance as a colonial resident, as Kandt had long felt conflicted over the oppression of the lower classes by the Rwandan court as well as the brutality of the colonial rule. Suffering from depression, Kandt later burned the manuscript of a book on Rwanda which he had been writing. The brutal counter-insurgency and imposition of new Tutsi overlords after Ndungutse's defeat also led to long-lasting resentments against the monarchy and Tutsi in general among northerners, with researcher Tharcisse Gatwa questioning whether the pro-government forces' brutality truly succeeded in pacifying the region's population. From 1959, northerners play a central role in overthrowing the monarchy during the Rwandan Revolution.

Historians have thematically linked the 1912 uprising with much later events in Rwanda. Nahimana himself used the events of Ndungutse's rebellion to incite Hutu against Tutsi in the 1990s, thereby contributing to the Rwandan genocide. Strizek also linked the 1912 conflict with the Rwandan Civil War and genocide: He pointed out that Rwandan rebel leader Paul Kagame was a Bega noble and had used foreign support to topple the then-ruling Hutu regime, mirroring how Yuhi V and his Bega allies had only defeated Ndungutse with German backing. Kagame is also the great-nephew of Rwubusisi. Thus, Strizek concluded, "a historical circle was closed" in 1994. (Note: Translated quote, in the original this reads in German: "So schließt sich ein historischer Kreis.")
