= Louis Rwagasore =

Burundian prince and politician (1932–1961)

Crown Prince (Note: Though styled "crown prince", Rwagasore was not heir apparent to the throne.) Louis Rwagasore
- Rwagasore in 1961

2nd Prime Minister of Burundi
- In office 28 September 1961 – 13 October 1961
- Monarch: Mwambutsa IV
- Governor: Jean-Paul Harroy
- Preceded by: Joseph Cimpaye
- Succeeded by: André Muhirwa

Personal details
- Born: 10 January 1932 Gitega, Ruanda-Urundi (now Burundi)
- Died: 13 October 1961 (aged 29) Usumbura, Ruanda-Urundi (now Bujumbura)
- Cause of death: Assassination by gunshot
- Party: UPRONA
- Spouse: Marie-Rose Ntamikevyo (m. 1959)
- Parents: King Mwambutsa IV (father); Thérèse Kayonga (mother)
- Relatives: Rosa Paula Iribagiza (sister); Ntare V (half-brother); Esther Kamatari (cousin)

Prince Louis Rwagasore (Kirundi: Ludoviko Rwagasore; 10 January 1932 – 13 October 1961) was a Burundian prince and politician, who was the second prime minister of Burundi for two weeks, from 28 September 1961 until his assassination on 13 October.

Born to the Ganwa family of Burundian Mwami (king) Mwambutsa IV in Belgian-administered Ruanda-Urundi in 1932, Rwagasore was educated in Burundian Catholic schools before attending university in Belgium. After he returned to Burundi in the mid-1950s he founded a series of cooperatives to economically empower native Burundians and build up his base of political support. The Belgian administration took over the venture, and as a result of the affair his national profile increased and he became a leading figure of the anti-colonial movement.

He soon thereafter became involved with a nationalist political party, the Union for National Progress (UPRONA). He pushed for Burundian independence from Belgian control, national unity, and the institution of a constitutional monarchy. Rwagasore sought to bring UPRONA mass appeal across different regions, ethnicities, and castes, and under him the party maintained a leadership balanced between ethnic Hutus and Tutsis, though the latter were usually favoured for more important positions. The Belgian administration disliked UPRONA and initially attempted to stifle Rwagasore's activities, placing him under house arrest in 1960 during municipal elections.

International pressure led the administration to back down, and the following year UPRONA won an overwhelming majority in the legislative elections. As a result, Rwagasore became prime minister of Burundi on 28 September 1961. Two weeks later, he was shot by a Greek national at the direction of leaders of a rival political party with the probable support of the Belgian Resident in Burundi. Rwagasore's death derailed his attempts to build national ethnic cohesion and facilitated the growth of Hutu–Tutsi tensions in the country. It also fractured UPRONA, as his former lieutenants engaged in a power struggle to succeed him as the party's leader. Within Burundi, Rwagasore enjoys nearly universal acclaim, and his assassination is commemorated annually with large ceremonies. He remains relatively unknown internationally in comparison to other leaders of independence movements in the African Great Lakes region.

== Early life ==
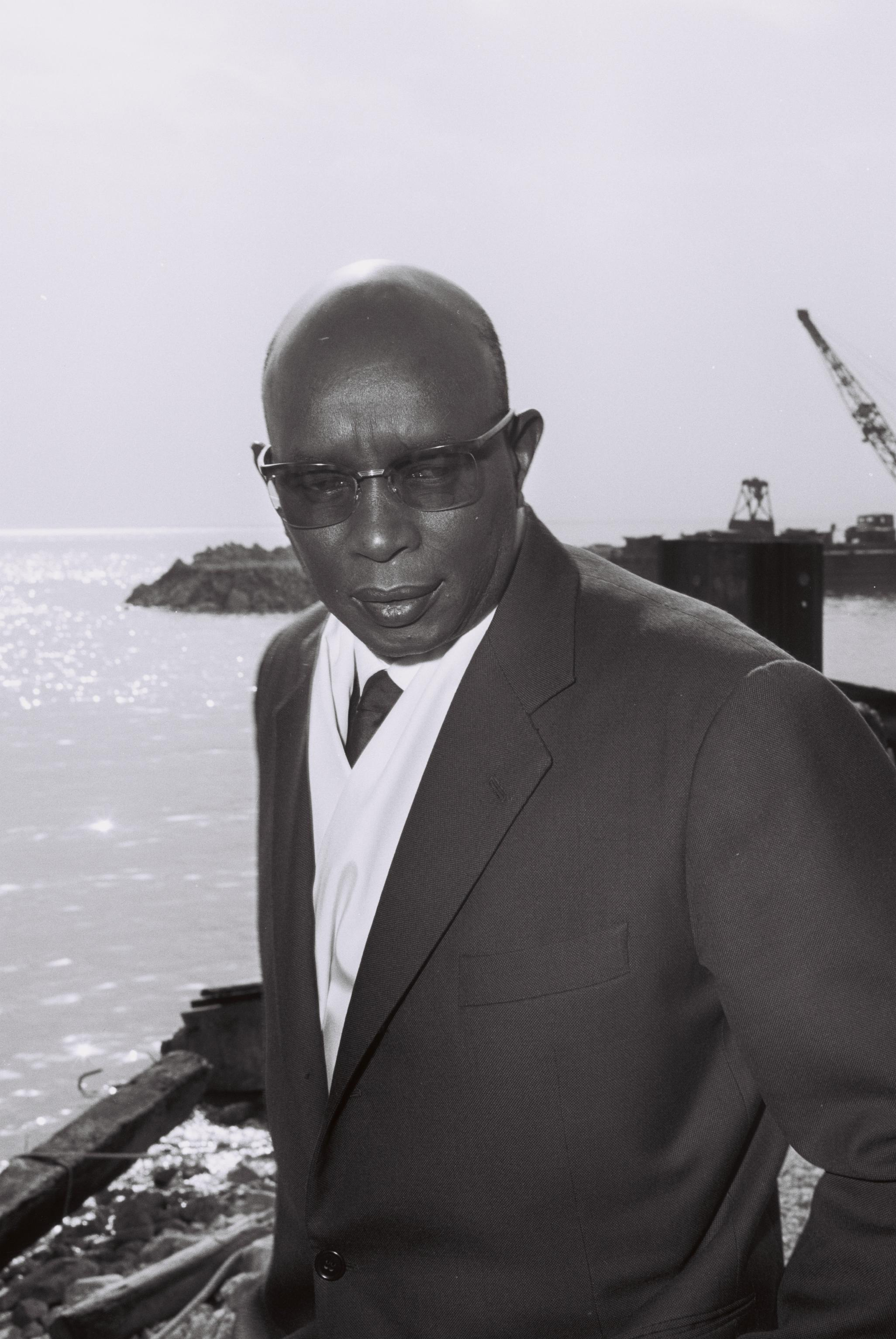
Rwagasore's father, King Mwambutsa IV, on a visit to Israel in 1962

Prince Louis Rwagasore was born on 10 January 1932 in Gitega, Ruanda-Urundi, to Mwami (king) Urundi Mwambutsa IV and Thérèse Kanyonga. Ethnically, he was a member of the Bezi clan of the Ganwa, a group of people of aristocratic status often associated with the Tutsis. The frequency of matrimonial alliances among the Ganwa gave Rwagasore familial links to numerous chiefs in Urundi. Mwambutsa and Kanyonga, after giving birth to Louis, birthed two daughters, Rosa Paula Iribagiza and Régine Kanyange, before divorcing in 1940. Mwambutsa remarried in 1946 and fathered a second son, Charles Ndizeye. Rwagasore began attending school at the age of seven, going to Catholic institutions in Bukeye, Kanyinya, and Gitega. In 1945 Rwagasore enrolled in the Groupe Scolaire d'Astrida. He studied there for six years, and in 1951, he went to Antwerp to study at the University Institute of Overseas Territories (Institut universitaire des Territoires d'Outre-Mer). He was a poor student, but after one year at the institute he enrolled at the Catholic University of Leuven, where after three years of study he earned a degree in political economy. Rwagasore returned to Urundi in December 1956. In April 1957 he was hired by the Belgian administration to oversee studies of economic, agricultural, and administrative concerns. On 12 September 1959 he married a Hutu woman, Marie-Rose Ntamikevyo, in Usumbura. They had two daughters, both of whom died in infancy.

== Political career ==
=== CCB and leadership of UPRONA ===
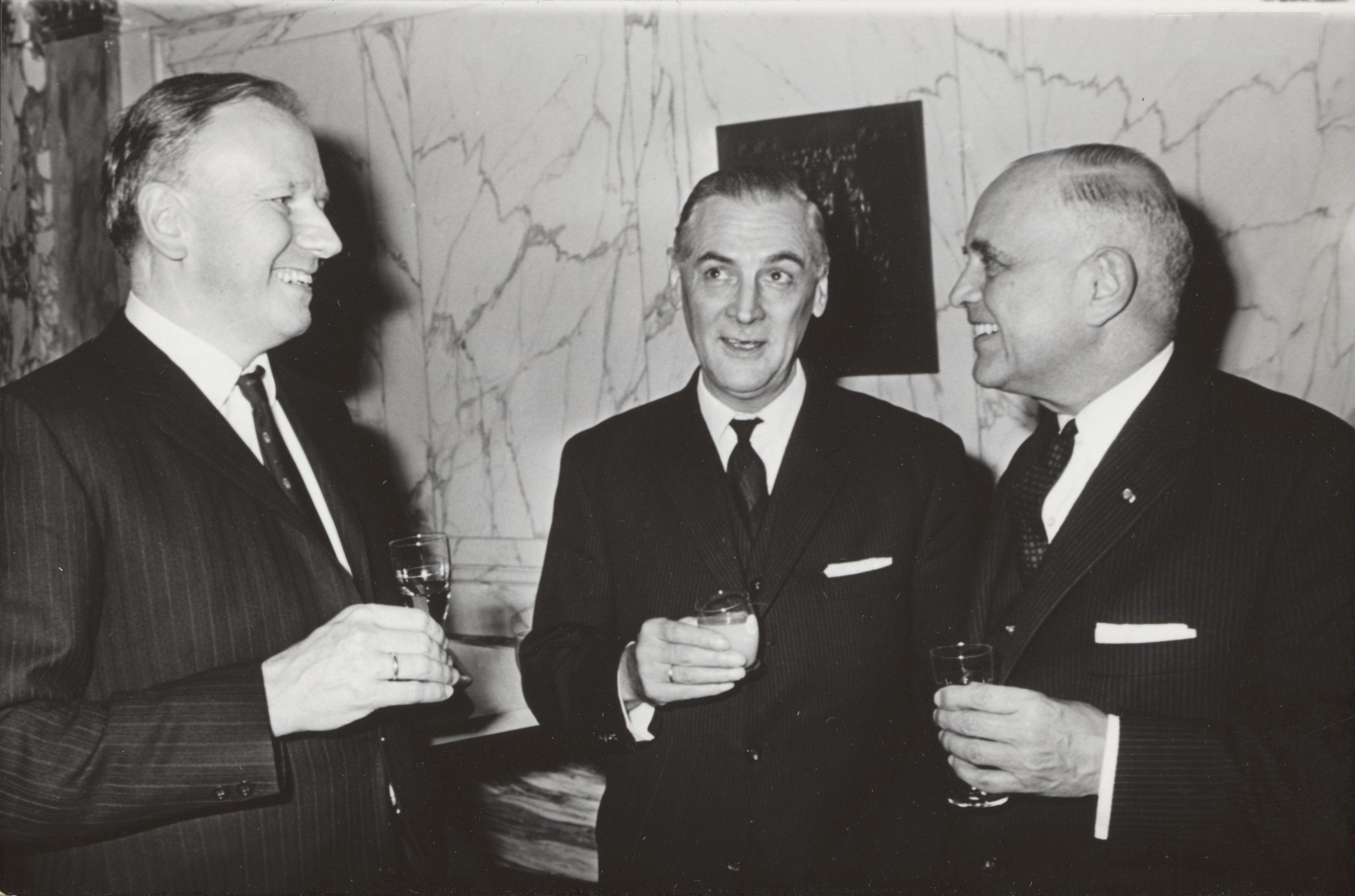
Ruanda-Urundi Governor Jean-Paul Harroy (right), c. 1968

In June 1957, Rwagasore founded a series of cooperatives, known as the Traders' Cooperatives of Burundi (Coopératives des Commerçants du Burundi, CCB), (Note: According to Carol Wilson Dickerman, the CCB was founded in 1956 but came under Rwagasore's leadership in 1957.) with the goal of empowering native Urundians to control their own commerce and thus building his personal support among Swahili traders of Usumbura. In its first public meeting, the CCB drew a crowd of 200 merchants, and it secured several favourable contracts with exporters. It facilitated the creation of links between rural farmers and urban traders, and, at the same time, Urundians began protesting fees and taxes levied by the Belgians. The colonial administration was irritated by the CCB, but reasoned that it could not take direct action against Rwagasore, with Governor of Ruanda-Urundi Jean-Paul Harroy writing to the Minister of Colonies that detaining or deporting the eldest son of the Mwami would be poorly received by peasants and lead to civil disorder.

Despite its early successes, the CCB ran into financial trouble, in part due to mismanagement. Rwagasore attributed the cooperatives' problems to Belgian sabotage, while the colonial administration accused Rwagasore of embezzling its money to fund a lavish lifestyle. To what extent either of these factors was true and how heavily they affected the project remains unclear. Rwagasore spent three months at the Expo 58 in Brussels seeking new investors and asked for help from President Gamal Abdel Nasser of Egypt, but these appeals were unsuccessful. He then requested credit for the cooperatives from the Supreme Land Council (Conseil Supérieur du Pays), an advisory body presided over by the Mwami that had some competence over budgetary and administrative affairs in Urundi. Though the Belgian administration informed the council that it disapproved of the cooperative, Rwagasore convinced the body to support him. The Belgian administration formally vetoed the loan in June, and intervened to take over the CCB. In the ensuing struggle, Rwagasore's national profile dramatically increased and he became a leading figure of the anti-colonial activists. The CCB was ultimately merged with an administration cooperative. As a result of the affair he forged connections with Tanganyikan nationalist Julius Nyerere, who provided him with advice and financial assistance. (Note: Rwagasore's connections with Nyerere caused consternation to the Belgian administration, and the Sûreté recorded the two meet each other in person about 10 times. The Belgians also feared Rwagasore's relations with Congolese nationalist Patrice Lumumba, but the two were not particularly close and only met each other twice. Nyerere later baptised one of his grandsons with the name Louis in honour of Rwagasore.)

Some time thereafter, Rwagasore became involved with a nascent political party, the Union for National Progress (Union pour le Progres National, UPRONA), though sources differ on the circumstances of UPRONA's founding and Rwagasore's role in its early days. (Note: According to political scientist Warren Weinstein, UPRONA was created shortly after a 1958 meeting of customary chiefs and clergy convened by Rwagasore and Léopold Biha to discuss nationalist ideas. According to Biha, UPRONA was created in 1957 to protest a Belgian administrative reorganisation that disempowered the monarchy. According to linguist Ellen K. Eggers, UPRONA was formed in the late 1950s and Rwagasore became heavily involved with it in 1958. Historian Ludo De Witte wrote that Rwagasore and some associates organised the first UPRONA meetings in September and October 1958. According to Governor Harroy, Rwagasore founded the party in late 1959. It received official recognition from the colonial administration as a political party on 7 January 1960.) He took virtual control over the movement, though his familial connection to the Mwami disqualified him from holding any party offices and he officially served UPRONA only as an advisor. UPRONA was able to secure the early financial support of the Swahili population in Bujumbura and Lake Tanganyika coastline. The party initially was strongly identified with the interests of the Bezi lineage of Ganwa and support for traditional institutions, but this alignment fell apart after Rwagasore came into conflict with his father. Mwambutsa had been quietly supportive of his son's attempts to build a political career in the late 1950s, but encouraged other Ganwa to compete with Rwagasore to ensure his own authority remained unchallenged. Mwambutsa cared little for UPRONA and his son was not among his close confidants. At the centre of their political differences was Rwagasore's anti-colonial rhetoric, which frustrated Mwambutsa, as he felt it strained the monarchy's relationship with the Belgians. In an attempt to distract Rwagasore from politics, the Belgian administration designated him head of the Butanyerera chiefdom (an area in Ngozi Province) in February 1959. He resigned from the post to focus on his political career.

Flag of Rwagasore's political party, the Union for National Progress (UPRONA)

Under Rwagasore, UPRONA pushed a program of modernisation, committing neither to a return to the feudal system nor a complete societal transformation. He used symbols of the monarchy to communicate his message and often emphasised his princely status at public appearances, but he stressed that UPRONA would support the monarchy "only insofar as this regime and its dynasty favoured the genuine emancipation of the Murundi people". He believed that only a constitutional monarchy could maintain legitimacy and that the Mwami should cede most authority to a civilian government. While conscious of socioeconomic problems, he primarily focused on issues relating to Urundian independence, popular legitimacy of the monarchy, and national unity. He advocated a foreign policy of nonalignment in the ongoing Cold War. Rwagasore sought to transform UPRONA into a mass party with broad-base appeal across different regions, ethnicities, and castes.

Wary of the growing Hutu–Tutsi conflict in Ruanda, (Note: Like Urundi, Ruanda's population was dominated by the Hutu and Tutsi ethnic groups and was historically ruled by the Mwami. Beginning in 1959, Hutus in Ruanda challenged the Tutsi-dominated mwamiship and social hierarchy, eventually culminating in the monarchy's overthrow and the establishment of a Hutu-dominated republic. These events caused significant anxiety among Urundi's political leaders.) he sought to counteract tensions by bringing members of both groups into UPRONA's leadership. Formal party positions at both the national and local levels were usually evenly divided between Hutus and Tutsis, though the latter tended to occupy the most important offices. The party enjoyed some cohesive success in Usumbura, but never truly cultivated a mass political base, especially outside the capital. UPRONA's internal rules set devolved responsibilities to the central committee, but in practice the party operated at the whim of Rwagasore; it retained relatively weak organisational capability and was held together by his charismatic leadership. His populist tendencies and personal popularity led many of the original chiefs who had supported UPRONA, including founding member Léopold Biha, to leave the party and engage in their own political activities. Rumours that the Mwami would pass the throne on to his younger son, Charles, facilitated criticisms by UPRONA's rivals that the party was simply a mechanism for Rwagasore to achieve power. In response, he issued a tract which said, "[I]f I do not become Mwami, will that prevent me from fighting for you, from being a great leader for you?"

Rwagasore favoured "immediate independence" from Belgian control. To protest colonial rule, he encouraged boycotts of European goods and refusal to pay taxes. The Belgian administration was wary of Rwagasore's nationalism, which it perceived as extremist, and supported the creation of a rival party, the Christian Democratic Party (Parti Démocratique Chrétien, PDC), a grouping seen as more moderate and which rejected immediate independence. Despite ideological differences, the rivalries between the two parties were primarily fueled by the intra-nobility conflicts, as the Bezi and Tare lineages backed UPRONA and PDC respectively. The two lineages had long struggled for control of the country. (Note: Researchers Helmut Strizek and Günther Philipp identified the conflict among the nobility as being of great national importance, as Hutu-Tutsi tensions and republican tendencies were playing a relatively minor role in Urundi at the time.) In 1959 Tare leader Chief Pierre Baranyanka questioned whether Mwambutsa's marriage to Kanyonga was legitimate according to custom in an attempt to challenge Rwagasore's place in the line to the throne. Even though UPRONA had distanced themselves from the Bezi, Rwagasore was still perceived as leader of the Bezi nobility by the time of the elections. As the PDC and UPRONA campaigned in early 1960, the antipathy between Rwagasore and Baranyanka grew; the former feared an assassination plot sponsored by the chief and began carrying a gun, while the latter wrote letters to the Mwami to condemn him for failing to control his son.

=== 1960 and 1961 elections ===
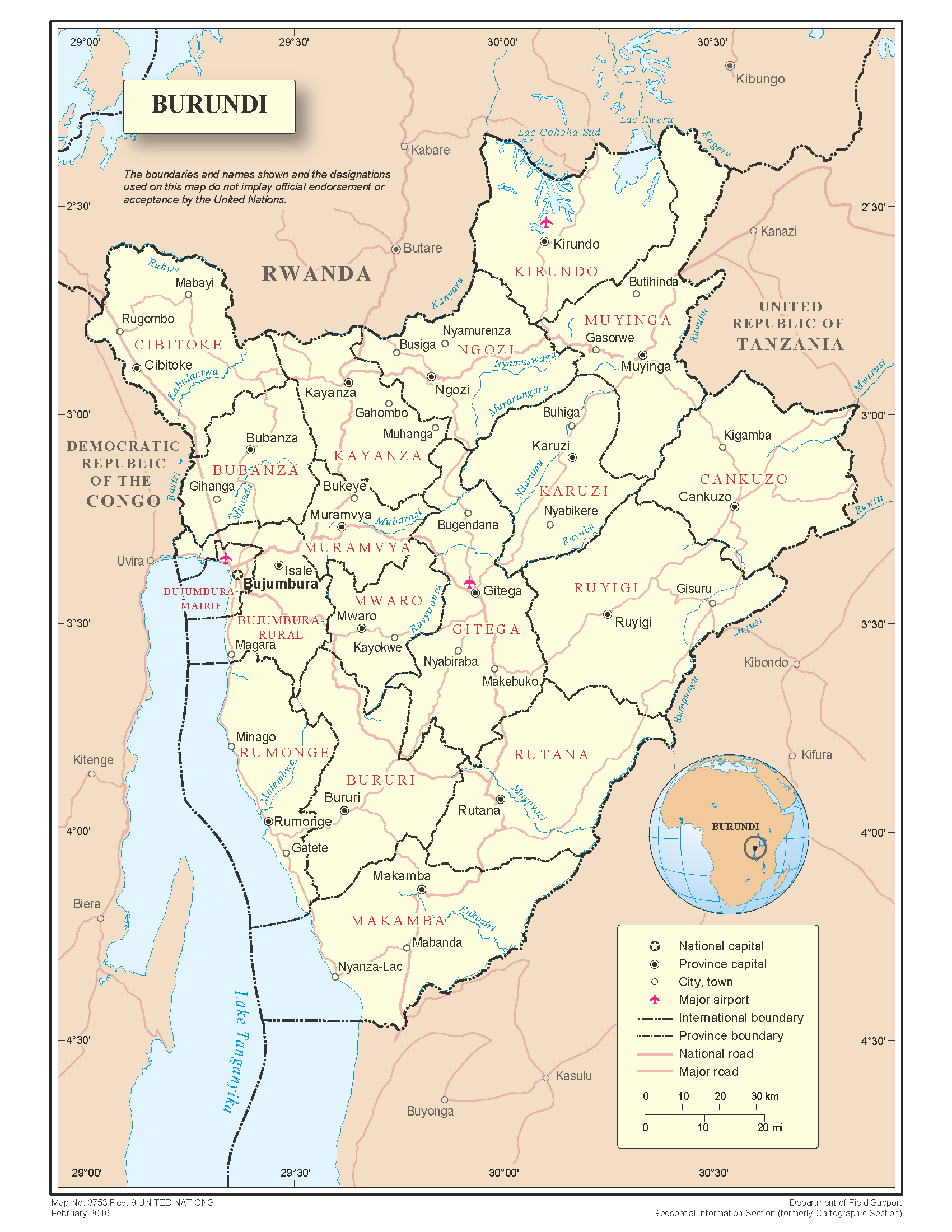
2016 map of Burundi

Rwagasore participated in the independence celebrations of the Republic of the Congo in June 1960. As civil order broke down and the Congo fell into crisis, he released a joint communique with rival politician Joseph Biroli on 15 July, appealing for calm and racial harmony, saying Urundi had "the unique chance ... to create in the heart of Africa an island of peace, tranquility and prosperity." In anticipation of Urundi's first municipal elections in November 1960, he issued circulars which called for people to "shake off foreign domination and slavery". Shortly before the contests were held, the administration placed Rwagasore under house arrest on 27 October with the pretext that he was violating a previous agreement by Urundian political parties stipulating that persons within two degrees of familial relationship to the Mwami be barred from political activity. (Note: Over 100 people, most of them UPRONA personalities, were detained at the same time for the same violation.) It further accused him of possessing "seditious" pamphlets.

In reality, the administration hoped the arrest would weaken UPRONA and generate a more preferable outcome in the elections. At the administration's encouragement, the PDC also joined with several other parties to create an anti-UPRONA cartel known as the Common Front (Front Commun, FC). Angered by the arrest of their leader, UPRONA declared a boycott of the elections. The PDC won a plurality of the offices in the contest, and in early 1961 the administration established a transitional government under Joseph Cimpaye with some PDC ministers but none from UPRONA. Rwagasore was released after the elections on 9 December 1960. Subsequent international scrutiny, particularly from the United Nations (UN), led the Belgians to withdraw themselves from national politics. The UN created a Commission for Ruanda-Urundi which liberalised the political sphere and restored Rwagasore's political rights. Thereafter he was allowed to engage in politics unhindered by the Belgian administration.

In 1961, the Belgian administration officially renamed Ruanda-Urundi as Rwanda-Burundi. For the 1961 legislative elections, UPRONA concentrated its entire election campaign on Rwagasore, using his charisma to rally substantial support. Rwagasore traveled across the country to introduce his party's candidates. Over the course of the elections, he was able to assemble a broad political coalition; even though most of it was pro-monarchical, he also voiced support for the leftist ideas of Patrice Lumumba from the neighboring Congo. This earned him the support of a small group of radical anti-monarchist Tutsi intellectuals. In the end, Rwagasore's coalition included representatives of the Tutsi oligarchy, conservative Hutu évolués, radical youth groups, urban factions, and large sections of the rural population. In general, UPRONA presented itself as strongly pro-monarchy, with the slogan "God, Fatherland, Mwami" being prominently used. The PDC had assumed victory was certain due to its success during the November 1960 municipal elections. It began its election campaign far too late, and also used the alternate slogan "God and Fatherland" which seemed to many Burundians to be deliberately critical of the monarchy, costing it substantial grassroots backing.

Burundi held legislative elections on 18 September 1961. With approximately 80% voter turnout, UPRONA won 58 of 64 seats in the Legislative Assembly, and Rwagasore was declared formateur. Two days later he delivered a speech over national radio aimed at reconciliation, saying that UPRONA's "electoral victory is not the one of the party. It is the triumph of order, that of discipline, of peace, of public tranquility ... the electoral campaign is over, the past must be forgotten". Belgian officials were generally unhappy with Rwagasore's victory, though they conceded some appreciation for his address. Angered by their loss, PDC members in Mukenke, Kirundo Province rioted and attacked UPRONA members. Rwagasore appealed to the latter not to be provoked, and the colonial authorities quickly restored order. On 28 September the Legislative Assembly convened to decide on a new government. In a secret ballot, 51 deputies indicated their desire for Rwagasore to lead the new government. He assembled a 10-member government of national unity which secured the confidence of all but one of the deputies in the Legislative Assembly and was sworn in. Pierre Ngendandumwe became Vice Prime Minister, while Rwagasore's brother-in-law, André Muhirwa, was made Minister of Interior.

Rwagasore's government did not offer a programme to the Assembly. In his inaugural address, he promised that his government would look "into the real problems of the nation, especially the economic problems, the problems of the land and of the social emancipation of the population, the problems of education and so many others, to which we will find our own solutions." His government was generally welcomed by Burundians, although some Hutu UPRONA members felt they were underrepresented. The government did not have any control over matters of defence, foreign affairs, or technical assistance—these competencies being reserved to the Belgian Resident—though Rwagasore proclaimed his wish to reduce the role of the colonial administration in Burundi to one of consultative aid. His government pledged to incorporate opposition party members into the administration and supported a political union with Rwanda and Tanganyika, though he later suggested that he wanted an economic union with Tanganyika but no association with the ethnically polarised Rwanda. He also promised to address Hutu interests. However, UPRONA's victory caused considerable unrest among the nobility, with the Tare lineage perceiving Rwagasore's success as a takeover by the Bezi. Existing hostilities between the nobility escalated as a result of the elections. As a measure of reconciliation, Rwagasore appointed a Tare as Director of Tourism. The Belgian Resident in Burundi, Roberto Régnier, later claimed that Rwagasore planned to make several FC figures ambassadors or grant them other positions, though in an interview with the press in October the prime minister remained vague about the place of an opposition in the new regime.

== Death ==
=== Assassination ===
On 13 October 1961, Rwagasore was shot in the throat, fired from approximately 60 feet (18 meters) away from a group of bushes while dining outdoors with friends and his cabinet members at the Hotel Tanganyika in Usumbura. He was pronounced dead at the scene. In the ensuing confusion, Rwagasore's assassin jumped into a waiting car and escaped. After being inspected by a doctor, Rwagasore's corpse was taken to Rhodain Hospital. A witness described the getaway car to the authorities, and an investigator was able to connect the vehicle to a group of people he had seen in the capital earlier that day. Within three days the police had arrested a Greek national, Ioannis Kageorgis—who had fired the shot—and three Burundian accomplices: Antoine Nahimana, Henri Ntakiyica, and Jean-Baptiste Ntakiyica. The latter three were all members of the PDC. The group quickly admitted responsibility for the murder and incriminated three other persons in their plot: Michel Iatrou, Jean-Baptiste Ntidendereza, and Joseph Biroli. The former was a Greek national who had given money to the PDC and was a business associate of Kageorgis. The latter two were high-ranking members of the PDC, with Ntidendereza having previously served as a minister in government. As sons of Chief Pierre Baranyanka, they were also distant cousins of Rwagasore.

=== Investigation ===
The investigators concluded that Ntidendereza and Biroli planned the assassination. Iatrou denied this, while Ntidendereza initially implicated himself in the conspiracy, saying that FC leaders viewed Rwagasore as an existential threat to multi-party democracy and that the prime minister had planned assassination attempts against himself and his father, before later recanting his testimony. The investigators also uncovered three previous assassination plots against Rwagasore in September which had been cancelled. On 2 April 1962 a Burundian tribunal composed of Belgian judges sentenced Kageorgis, Nahimana, and Ntidendereza to death for their role in the murder. Two others accused of minor roles in the affair, Pascal Bigirindavyi (a Burundian) and Liverios Archianotis (a Greek), were given prison sentences. On 7 May the Court of Appeal affirmed Kageorgis' sentence but commuted the other death sentences to 20 years of penal servitude. On 30 June, one day before Burundi's independence, Kageorgis was executed. Following independence Burundi established a Supreme Court with retroactive competence, and on 27 October it ruled the previous trials to have violated the right to judgement by a jury established by the new constitution and ordered a retrial. On 27 November the lower court found Ntidendereza, Biroli, Nahimana, Iatrou, and Ntakiyica guilty and sentenced them to death. The defendants' final appeal to the Supreme Court was denied, as were the attempts of the Belgian government to convince the Mwami to offer clemency, and on 15 January 1963 all five were publicly hanged.

=== Responsibility ===
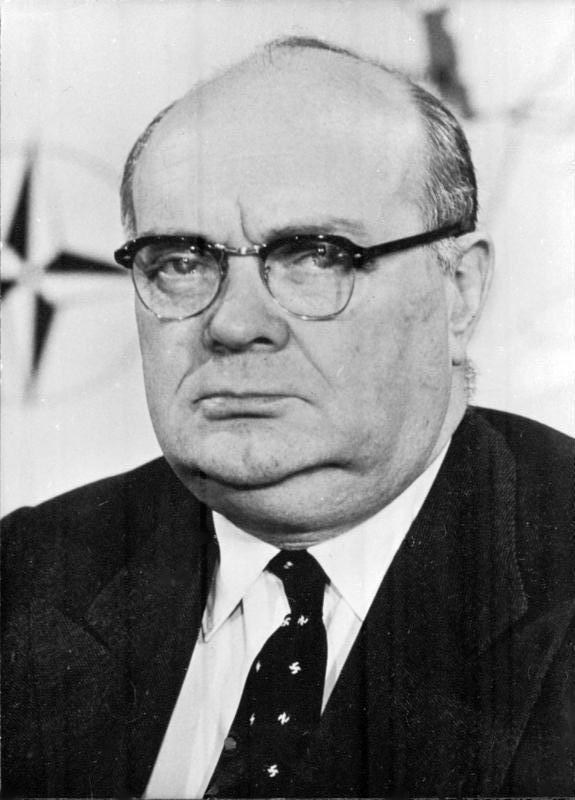
Belgian Foreign Minister Paul-Henri Spaak, who sent several telegrams to officials in Usumbura inquiring about the role of "Europeans" in Rwagasore's assassination

There was immediate concern in Burundi following the killing that the Belgian administration shared responsibility for Rwagasore's murder. When Governor Harroy went to the hospital to pay respects to the corpse of the late prime minister, Rwagasore's mother confronted him in a hallway and slapped him. Belgian Foreign Minister Paul-Henri Spaak sent several telegrams to officials in Usumbura inquiring about the role of "Europeans" in the events. Spaak was also fearful of a UN inquiry and ordered Harroy to send him a detailed report on the murder which he could present so as to assuage international concerns. The UN General Assembly ultimately passed a resolution calling for an investigation and dispatched a Commission for Ruanda-Urundi delegation to Burundi to draft a report. The commission noted complaints from UPRONA leaders which accused the administration of being complicit in the murder, with additional accusations of culpability lodged against Brioli's and Ntidendereza's father, Chief Baranyanka. The body also received complaints that the PDC leaders were given favourable treatment in prison. The commission's report was ultimately dismissive of such concerns and affirmed the findings of the original criminal investigation.

Generally, little academic attention has been paid to the details of the murder. Political scientist René Lemarchand wrote, "That the assassin, [Ioannis] Kageorgis, was a mere tool ... that the crime was the result of a political conspiracy organised by Biroli and Ntidendereza, and that the ultimate aim of this conspiracy was to create disturbances throughout the realm that would then be exploited by the PDC to its own advantages—these are well-established facts. However, the PDC leaders might have not resorted to such drastic action unless they had been actively encouraged to go ahead with their plans by certain Belgian functionaries." Harroy wrote in his 1987 memoirs pertaining to concerns of Belgian support for the assassination that, "To deny this seems unreasonable." Belgian journalist Guy Poppe wrote a book on Rwagasore's assassination in 2012, but conceded that its publication was rushed and that he was not "well placed enough" to make concrete claims on the extent of Belgian involvement. Historian Ludo De Witte concluded that the "Residency at Gitega was an accomplice" and that "Belgian responsibility must be attributed to ... Régnier and some of his collaborators.

Noting civil disorder fomented by opposition members in the aftermath of the September 1961 elections with the alleged support of Belgian administrators, De Witte argued that Rwagasore's assassination fitted into a larger scheme to provoke a civil war which would allow the Belgian administration to intervene and install a regime of its choosing, as in Rwanda. In regards to the concrete motives of Biroli and Ntidendereza, political scientist Helmut Strizek and researcher Günther Philipp argued that Rwagasore's assassination was probably inspired by the Bezi-Tare rivalry. (Note: Concerning Kageorgis' motives, Kageorgis told investigators that he had been offered a large sum of money by Iatrou to kill Rwagasore. According to Ntidendereza, Iatrou disliked Rwagasore and UPRONA and feared that after they took power his property and personal security would be threatened, as had happened to him during the civil unrest in the Congo following its independence.) The PDC's European secretary, Sabine Belva, testified during the appellate trial that Régnier hosted a meeting shortly after the September elections and had asked "whether the elimination of Rwagasore had been considered, as a means of solving the political problem." Belva stated that she reported this to Ntidendereza. In court, Régnier denied making such remarks. The Belgian judges determined in their verdict that these comments were only "jokes which were expressed lightly" and thus not worthy of serious investigation. Biroli's and Ntidendereza's lawyers also insisted on the responsibility of Belgian officials, though this was rejected by the presiding judge. Some lower-ranking officials in the Belgian Residency were dissuaded from testifying during the proceedings by the Belgian Foreign Ministry, which threatened to have them dismissed from their posts. A separate investigation conducted by the Brussels Public Prosecutor's Office after the initial Burundian proceedings ended—as Kageorgis had requested a pardon from the Belgian King on the grounds that others played a greater role in the murder—obtained the depositions of several Belgian civil servants. Hubert Léonard, an official in the Residency, testified that on 21 September 1961 Régnier had stated in a meeting, "Rwagasore must be killed!"

Confronted with this, Régnier admitted to the Brussels Office that he had said such. The evidence gathered by the Brussels Public Prosecutor's Office was not made public, though portions of it were shared with the Burundian courts once they reopened their investigation following independence. Spaak threatened to suspend bilateral aid to Burundi for renewing the inquiry, causing consternation to the Burundian government, though this never occurred. De Witte surmised, "Burundi wanted the skin of those who murdered Rwagasore, at the risk of upsetting Brussels, but Spaak resigned himself to it and did not question Belgium's 'development aid' ... In return, Bujumbura kept the Brussels Public Prosecutor's report under wraps and avoided accusing the Belgians." In 1972, the Burundian government issued a report in an attempt to deflect responsibility for the massacres of the Ikiza. The document included an accusation that Régnier had organised Rwagasore's murder. The matter of the assassination was thereafter ignored by the government for many years, though in 2001 some Burundian parliamentarians called on the Belgian government to open an official investigation into the killing. On 14 October 2018 the Burundian government officially accused Belgium of being the "true backer of the assassination of Rwagasore" and declared that it would set up a "technical commission" to investigate the killing, though no progress on this has since been made. (Note: De Witte wrote that while Burundi was in possession of the Brussels Public Prosecutor's report (or at least excerpts of it) on the role of Belgian officials since 1962, it has never fully released it and has opted to make only vague accusations. He believed that, "Never has Bujumbura presented a compelling case." He argued that Burundian governments have preferred to use the threat of releasing the file as "means of blackmail against Belgium – in order to incite Brussels to temper or swallow its criticisms of human rights violations by Bujumbura.")

=== Political effects ===
Muhirwa succeeded Rwagasore as Prime Minister of Burundi. Citing the distraction of "recent events", Muhirwa declined to offer a government programme and the Legislative Assembly sat in session aimlessly for the next few months. The establishment of the role of opposition figures in the assassination plot and their subsequent execution led to the immediate demise of a formal parliamentary opposition in Burundi. Rwagasore's death derailed his attempts to build national inter-ethnic cohesion and facilitated the growth of Hutu–Tutsi tensions; the latter came to eclipse the internal Ganwa rivalries in national politics. Subsequent governments remained ethnically diverse but unstable. The assassination also fractured UPRONA, as Rwagasore's former lieutenants struggled to succeed him as the party's leader; figures of Ganwa aristocracy eventually succeeded in claiming control of the organisation. UPRONA subsequently used Rwagasore's image to promote itself while disregarding his vision for the party, ultimately becoming a vehicle for exclusionary, Tutsi-elitist, single-party rule. There is a belief among some Burundians that Rwagasore's murder created a political void with long-term implications for the country and contributed to its later instability.

== Legacy ==
=== Burial and official commemoration ===
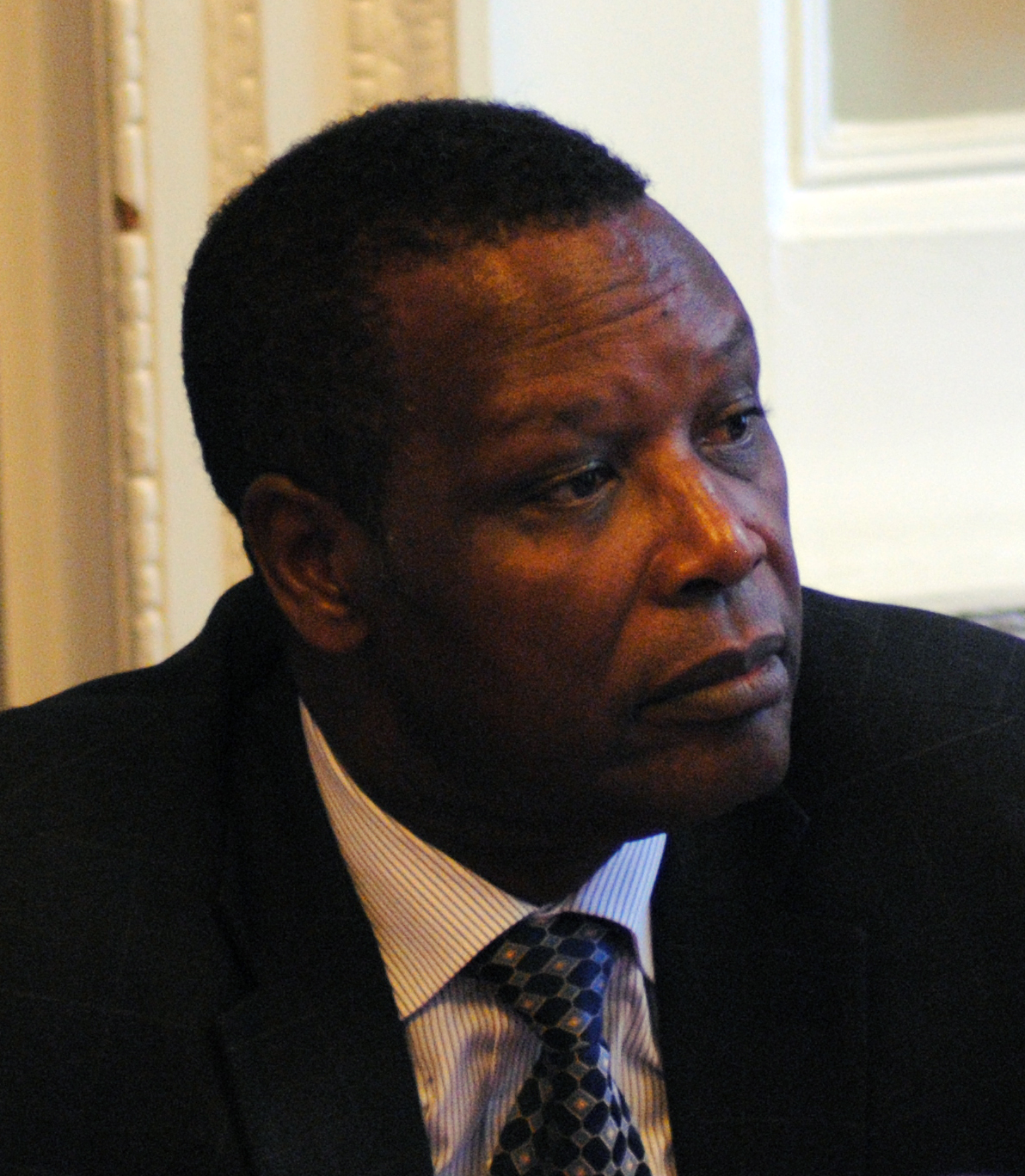
President Pierre Buyoya, who used Rwagasore as a symbol of national unity

Rwagasore was buried on 18 October 1961 at the plot of Vugizo in Bujumbura. Burundi was granted independence in 1962, and in his official speech marking the event, Prime Minister Muhirwa paid extensive tribute to Rwagasore and credited him for pushing the country towards sovereignty. From 1962 to 1963 a monument was constructed at Rwagasore's burial site, featuring a mausoleum and three arches with a black cross. Prince Louis Rwagasore Stadium was also constructed to honour him. The government funded these projects by releasing a series of postage stamps bearing his image in February 1963. That year the government declared 13 October a public holiday and renamed a hospital and avenue in Bujumbura in commemoration. His image was also used to adorn public buildings, while the first printings of the Burundian franc included banknotes with his visage. (Note: The 100 franc note, which has borne Rwagasore's image since it was introduced, is the one most commonly used by Burundians in daily life.) Two more postage series featuring Rwagasore were later released; one in 1966 pairing his image with that of assassinated United States President John F. Kennedy, and another in 1972 celebrating the 10th anniversary of Burundian independence. Numerous schools and roads in Burundi have since been named for him, as was the sole aircraft of the country's first state airline, and the Legislative Assembly created the Order of Prince Louis as a national order of merit.

In 1966 Captain Michel Micombero launched a military coup, overthrowing the monarchy and transforming Burundi into a republic with himself as its president. UPRONA subsequently became the only legal political party. Micombero referred to himself as the "successor" and sometimes "little brother" of Rwagasore. Throughout his tenure the late prime minister was frequently honoured in public ceremonies, and his portrait remained prevalent in public places. In 1976, Micombero was overthrown and replaced by Colonel Jean-Baptiste Bagaza. Bagaza tried to present himself as a moderniser, and Rwagasore's reputation thus competed with him. As a result, he deemphasised mention of Rwagasore and suspended celebration of the 13 October holiday. In 1987 Bagaza was overthrown by Major Pierre Buyoya. Following ethnic violence in 1988, Buyoya declared a policy of national unity, and used Rwagasore as a symbol of this. Under Buyoya's tenure, more portraits of Rwagasore were hung in public places, the mausoleum was renovated and a UPRONA-sponsored Rwagasore Institute was created to promote national reconciliation.

The historic significance of Rwagasore's murder is enormous: it is truly a day on which doors were closed for Burundi ... From now on, increasingly, the Rwandan term for demokarasi, referring to ethnic majority politics, would sound appealing to some Burundian Hutu and scary to most Tutsi.

— Peter Uvin, American political scientist, writing in 2009

In the 1990s, Burundi underwent a democratic transition which included the reestablishment of multi-party politics. The end of UPRONA's monopoly on power led to a decline in public celebration of Rwagasore. One of the key nascent opposition parties, Front for Democracy in Burundi (Front pour la Démocratie au Burundi, FRODEBU), made reference to Rwagasore in its official publication but avoided all associations of him with UPRONA. FRODEBU won the parliamentary and presidential elections in 1993. The new president, Melchior Ndadaye, did not attend any official commemorations for Rwagasore in October. Ndadaye was assassinated in a coup attempt later that month, plunging Burundi into a crisis which evolved into a civil war. During this time Rwagasore was usually invoked only by politicians in self-serving fashion or by newspapers calling for reconciliation.

In the late 1990s, the belligerents in the civil war partook in peace talks. The resulting Arusha Accords praised the "charismatic leadership of Prince Louis Rwagasore and his companions" who had kept Burundi from "plunging into a political confrontation based on ethnic considerations". The implementation of the accords and further negotiation eventually resulted in the election of Pierre Nkurunziza as president in 2005. During his tenure, he attended annual celebrations of Rwagasore in October and frequently mentioned him in his speeches. His government also repaired several monuments to the late premier and erected a new one jointly honoring him and Ndadaye at a roundabout in Bujumbura. In 2019 he renamed Rwagasore Stadium, but stated that the planned parliament building to be built in Gitega would bear Rwagasore's name.

=== Popular reputation ===
After his death, historian Aidan Russell wrote that Rwagasore's reputation was quickly transformed into that of a "hero and martyr" and that he was the subject of a "competitive hagiography". Within Burundi, his reputation enjoys nearly-universal acclaim, with his speeches often quoted in political discussions and his surviving political opponents and their descendants offering praise of him. His assassination is commemorated annually with large ceremonies.

Historian Christine Deslaurier wrote that "it is the martyrological dimensions of his anti-colonialism that have established a consensus around his mythical figure, more than his political and social thought." De Witte wrote that Rwagasore has "functioned as a two-dimensional icon". Rwagasore's widespread popularity in Burundi stands in contrast to the divided feelings toward most other domestic historical figures. He remains relatively unknown internationally, with his career overshadowed by those of Nyerere and Lumumba and his assassination eclipsed by the Congo Crisis and the contemporary ethnic violence in Rwanda.
