= Rugezi Marsh =

Rugezi Marsh Ruhengeri Marsh
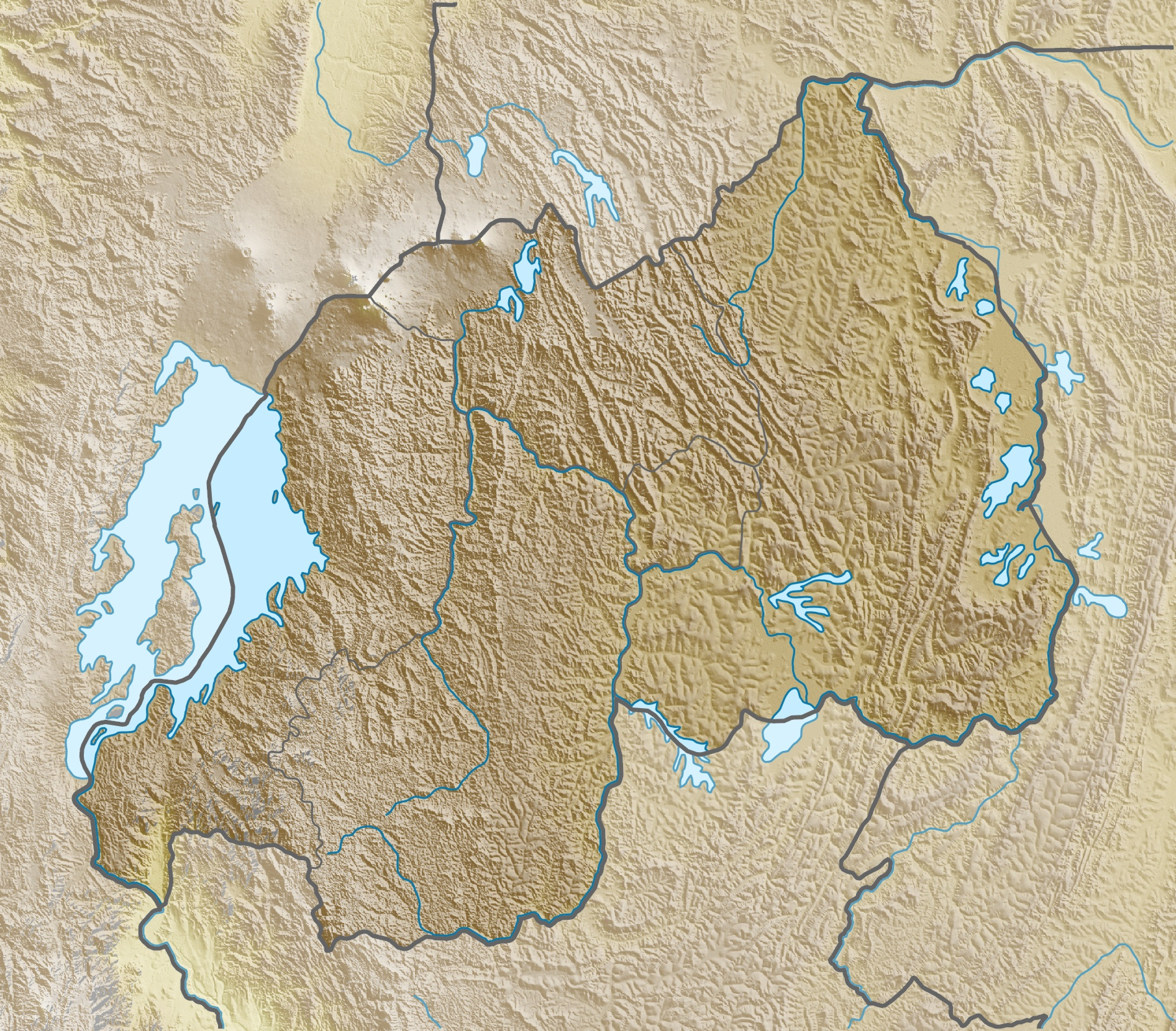
- Location within Rwanda
- Location: Rwanda
- Coordinates: 01°29′00″S 29°51′00″E
- Area: 6,735 hectares (16,640 acres)

The Rugezi Marsh (also known as Ruhengeri Marsh) is a protected area in Rwanda, covering 6,735 hectares (16,640 acres). The wetland is one of headwaters of the Nile, situated in the Northern Province within the Buberuka Highlands. At 2,100 metres (6,900 ft), the marsh is a high altitude peat bog. Rugezi developed from an accumulation of organic materials within a quartzite rock-trapping water depression. In its natural state, Rugezi has been playing a significant ecological, hydrological, socio-economical, historic, and recreational role in Rwanda. It is also an Important Bird Area (IBA) recognized by the BirdLife International in 2001, and is reported to be the habitat of 43 species of birds within and in the surrounding areas of the marsh; the area of IBA is identified as ha8,500 hectares (21,000 acres). The specific species of Grauer's swamp warbler (Bradypterus graueri) and white-winged swamp warbler (Bradypterus carpalis) living together is reported as "unusual" by BirdLife International.

== Geography ==
The Rugezi Marsh is a high altitude valley created due to the uplift of Buberuka Highlands. Its boundary extends between southern latitude 1° 21’30’’and 1°36’11’’ and eastern longitudes 29°49’59’’and 29°59’50.’’ The hills in the marshy land are caused due to erosion and are found formed in round shape. Its geological formation consists of metamorphic rocks. The ridges surrounding the flooded marsh is of quartzite formations. In its natural state, the Rugezi Marsh formed a dense mat over floating peat formation in its deeper waters. Average annual rainfall in the marsh is reported to be of 1,200 millimetres (47 in).

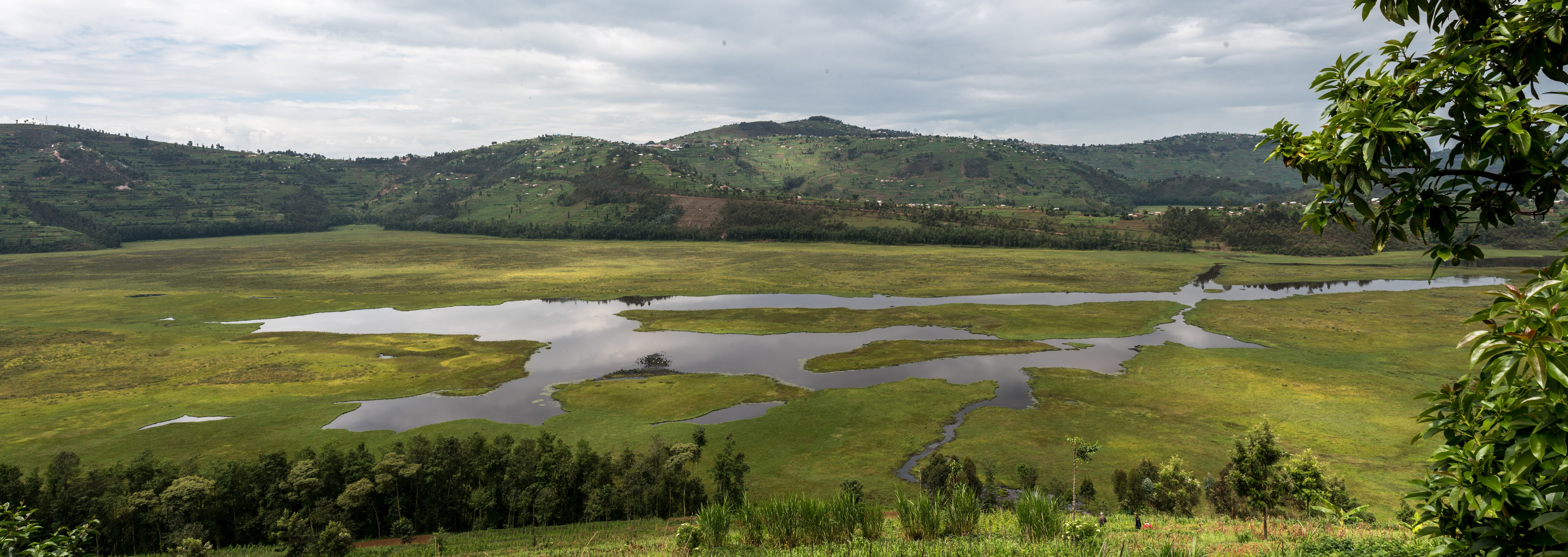
Rugezi wetland

== Hydrology ==
The marsh land functions as a regulating basin to moderate the flows inflows and outflows and is given the epithet "earth kidneys". The marsh regulates, retains, and filters water resources which flow into the downstream lakes of Bulera (bordering Uganda) and Ruhondo. Environmental issues related to Rugezi Marsh include agricultural reclamation and drainage by ELECTROGAZ (Agency for Electricity, Water and Gas supply). However, its effectiveness as water balancing of the resources has been dented in recent years due to high anthropogenic pressure and also due to the development specific project of agricultural reclamation and drainage of the marsh.

== Flora ==
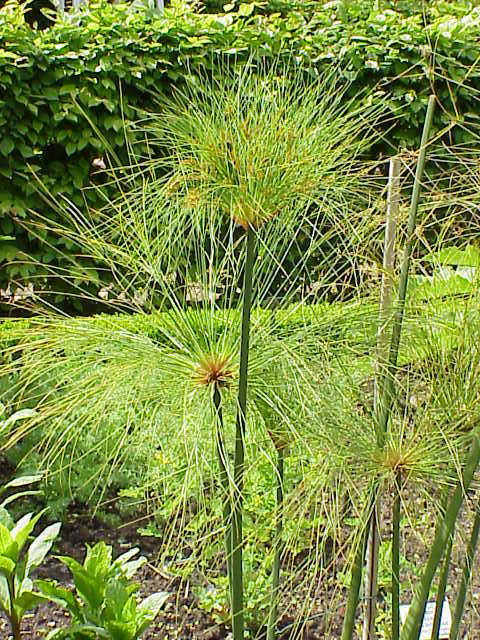
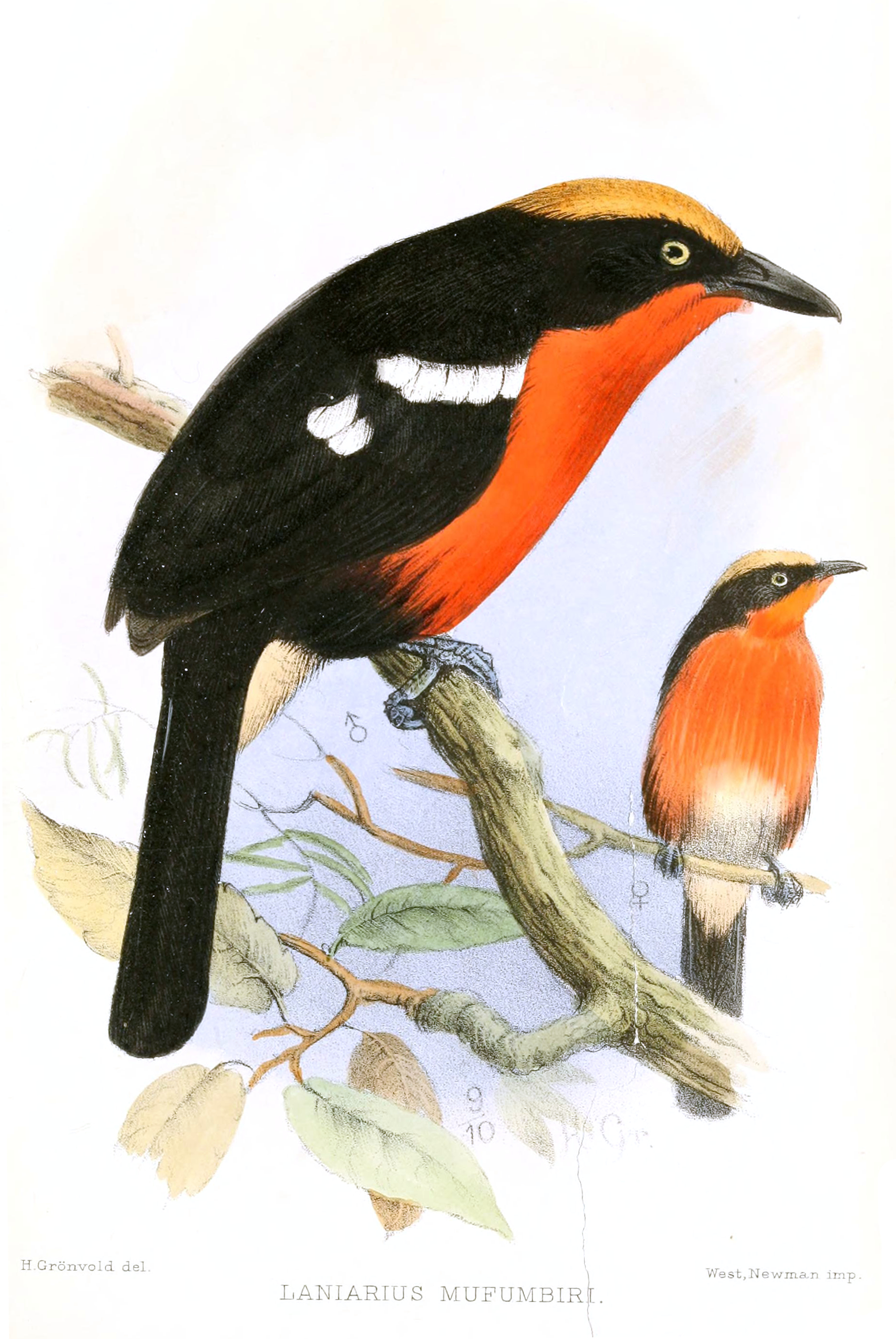
Left: Cyperus papyrus. Right: Sketch of Laniarius mufumbiri (papyrus gonolek) by Henrik Grönvold

The floral species reported from the marsh are Miscanthidium violaceum, Cyperus latifolius and papyrus C. papyrus species is reported near the outlet of the lake.

== Avifauna ==
Of the 43 species of birds (all are resident birds) in the marsh and its surrounding Afrotropical Highlands biome, the globally threatened species under defined categories are the following.

- Bradypterus graueri (Grauer's swamp-warbler) (EN)
- Laniarius mufumbiri (papyrus gonolek) (NT)
- Calamonastides gracilirostris (papyrus yellow warbler) (VU)
- Balearica regulorum (Grey crowned crane) (EN)

Apart from the above, some of the species of least concern are the following.

- Cisticola carruthersi (Carruthers's cisticola)
- Bradypterus carpalis (white-winged scrub-warbler)
- Onychognathus tenuirostris (slender-billed starling)
- Ploceus baglafecht (baglafecht weaver)
- Nesocharis ansorgei (white-collared oliveback)
- Crithagra frontalis (yellow-browed citril)
- Crithagra koliensis (papyrus canary)
- Crithagra burtoni (thick-billed seedeater)
