= Eberhard Gudowius =

German colonial officer

German colonial resident of the Kingdom of Burundi (acting)
- In office January 1909 – April 1909
- Monarchs: Wilhelm II, German Emperor; Mutaga IV of Burundi
- Preceded by: Heinrich Fonck
- Succeeded by: Erich von Langenn-Steinkeller

German colonial resident of the Kingdom of Rwanda (acting)
- In office 1911–1913
- Monarchs: Wilhelm II, German Emperor; Yuhi V Musinga
- Preceded by: Richard Kandt
- Succeeded by: Richard Kandt

Personal details
- Born: 29 July 1878 Schöneiche, Wohlau, Kingdom of Prussia, German Empire
- Died: Unknown
- Nickname: bwana lazima ("you must")

Military service
- Allegiance: German Empire
- Branch/service: Schutztruppe
- Years of service: ?–1916
- Rank: Captain
- Battles/wars: Ndungutse's rebellion; World War I; East African campaign; Battle of Bukoba; Tabora offensive (POW)

Eberhard Gudowius (Note: Surname less commonly spelled "Gudovius".) was a German military officer who served as acting colonial resident in Burundi (1909) and Rwanda (1911–1913), helping to suppress native uprisings. He later served as a commander in the World War I's East African campaign until being captured by British forces in 1916. After the conflict, he was active as an author.

== Biography ==
=== Early life and career ===
Gudowius was born in Schöneiche, Wohlau district, on 29 July 1878. His father was the royal forester for Rothemühl. He graduated from the Pädagogium Putbus, a gymnasium in Putbus, in 1895/96 and embarked on a career as a military officer. He eventually joined the Schutztruppe, the German colonial army, and became a lieutenant. He served in German East Africa, where the Germans had partially implemented a system of indirect rule through native monarchies.

In January 1909, Gudowius became acting German colonial resident of the Kingdom of Burundi, succeeding Heinrich Fonck. He held this position until April 1909, when he was replaced by Erich von Langenn-Steinkeller.

=== Service in Rwanda ===
After his service in Burundi, Gudowius was appointed as the deputy of Richard Kandt, German colonial resident of the Kingdom of Rwanda. When Kandt left the region for a long home visit in 1911, Gudowius became acting resident. In this position, he quickly became impatient with the local indirect rule including the intricacies of the appointment of native notables. He thus started to appoint "government chiefs" (Regierungsamtwale) who were loyal to him and directly implement his orders as well as act intermediaries between Rwandans and non-Rwandans.

In early 1912, he was confronted by a crisis when a major rebellion broke out in northern Rwanda. The rebels were led by Ndungutse who claimed to be the rightful king (mwami) of Rwanda, challenging Yuhi V Musinga. Unlike Kandt, Gudowius had showcased little interest in the internal politics of the Rwandan monarchy and thus was not automatically supportive of Yuhi V. Contemplating that Ndungutse might be a more pliant ally if he gained the throne through a German intervention, the lieutenant even pondered to offer support to the insurgent leader. His reluctance to intervene was also motivated by Ndungutse's contradictory actions and statements, as the rebel seemed to pose both as an anti-colonial populist as well as a German ally. Either way, Gudowius decided to enforce a ceasefire between the warring parties and rejected Yuhi V's demands for a counter-insurgency operation, earning the current monarch's lasting enmity.

In April 1912, Gudowius suddenly changed his stance for unknown reasons and, alongside Yuhi V's royalists, organized a large-scale operation against Ndungutse's forces. As part of an early surprise attack on the main rebel base, the lieutenant reportedly shot a man who was later identified as Ndungutse, though the insurgent leader's death remained unconfirmed. After the defeat of the main rebel force, Gudowius led the German-Rwandan royalist forces on a punitive campaign across northern Rwanda, causing great destruction and deliberately targeting civilians. The lieutenant also ordered the execution of Rukara, another rebel leader.

After the end of Ndungutse's rebellion, Gudowius received the traditional honors for warriors by the Rwandan court. Conversely, Yuhi V was still upset over the German officer's earlier stalling, and thus tried to humiliate him by having a native poet compose a self-deprecatory Kinyarwanda victory poem for Gudowius. This poem was read in front of the court, but the lieutenant was ignorant of its true meanings due to not understanding Kinyarwanda. When someone informed him of the poem's true nature, a furious Gudowius retaliated by using another Rwandan tradition: Yuhi V was forced parade his prized cattle before the German officer in public, a traditional move for a Rwandan to acknowledge someone as a superior and patron.

In the following period, Gudowius appointed more "government chiefs"; among others he selected Rwamaga as chief of Mutara and Biganda as a mutware (commander of a native regiment) to oversee parts of Mulera. Conversely, he still asked for Yuhi V's approval when naming these officials. At some point, Gudowius explored the rivers in Rwanda, discovering that the Nyabarongo River presented a navigatable waterway between the Kagera River and the settlement of Kigali.

=== World War I ===
In World War I, Gudowius operated in northwestern German East Africa. He earned the local nickname bwana lazima ("you must"). In June 1915, he was left in charge of 150 soldiers to defend Bukoba, an important German-held town at Lake Victoria. At the time, his superior Major Willibald von Struemer had been deceived by a British feint on the Kagera River and led most of Bukoba's garrison westward. When a British fleet thus approached Bukoba and landed troops near the town on 22 June, Gudowius' forces were heavily outnumbered in the following battle. Despite his small force, Gudowius organized counter-attacks which delayed the British advance, but eventually had to concede ground around the town. Struemer and his troops returned later that day, but the defense became increasingly desperate. On 23 June, the German garrison retreated from Bukoba to avoid being encircled and destroyed. After destroying and looting the town, the British retreated. The Germans reoccupied the ruined location, and tried to restore order by heavily punishing continued looting by native civilians. Afterward, Gudowius was officially put in control of Bukoba by Struemer.

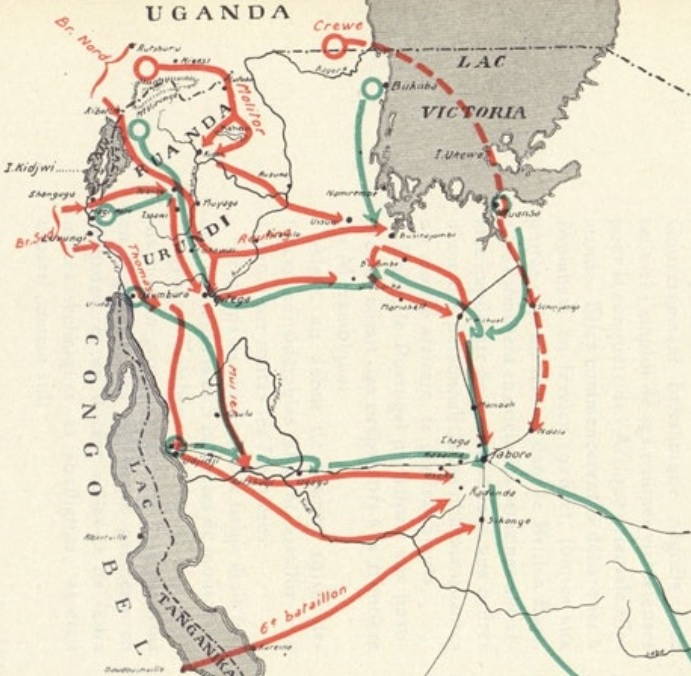
Map of the Tabora offensive in 1916. The retreat of Gudowius' forces from Bukoba can be seen in the northwest, intercepted by Major Rouling's troops south of Lake Victoria.

Over the next months, Gudowius was promoted to captain and appointed overall commander of the German forces at Lake Victoria. In 1916, the British conducted a number of feints –including troop landings and naval bombardments– at western Lake Victoria, hoping to pin down Gudowius' force and prevent him from reinforcing German forces further west that were targeted by a Belgian offensive. Conversely, historian E. Paice argued that Gudowius had probably never planned to reinforce the western German forces in the first place, as the Bukoba garrison was already depleted, on the defensive, and in no position to shift its troops. Furthermore, Gudowius and other German officers had been ordered to conduct delaying operations instead of trying to stand and fight against the developing Belgian-British offensive across the northwest. In the face of a major British landing, Gudowius abandoned Bukoba and led his 800 troops southward, organizing a fighting retreat. His initial destination remained unclear to the Allied forces, but he relocated to Kato near the southernmost tip of Lake Victoria. Though still undetected, his force became gradually encircled by the advancing Allies. He thus organized a breakout attempt. On 3 July, a Belgian Force Publique contingent (namely Brigade Nord) under Major Rouling discovered a 300-strong group led by Gudowius near Kato, initiating a fierce, two hours-long battle. The Belgians suffered heavy losses, but managed to defeat the German troops. Gudowius was separated from his troops and then chanced upon Major Rouling, whereupon the opposing commanders reportedly engaged in a pistol duel. Both were heavily wounded, and the German captain eventually surrendered. (Note: The duel was later mythologized as a knightly clash on open field, though historian Michael Pesek argued that this ignored the actual, brutal realities of the Battle of Kato.) Most of his remaining troops were also captured over the next days.

=== Later life ===
After World War I, Gudowius became active as a writer. In 1928/29, he published an article on his exploration of the Nyabarongo River. He also wrote a right-wing short story titled Expedition gegen Ndungutze und Bassebja ("Expedition against Ndungutse and Basebya"), published in a collection of colonial literature by Werner von Langsdorff in 1936. Historian Timm Ebner categorized this publication as one example of right-wing colonial literature of Nazi Germany which emphasized a motive of retaliation, as allegedly heroic colonists and Schutztruppe members were depicted in their battles against "traitorous" native rebels.

The death date of Gudowius is unknown.
