= Erich von Langenn-Steinkeller =

- Erich von Langenn-Steinkeller in 1911

German colonial resident of the Kingdom of Burundi
- In office April 1909 – September 1909
- Monarchs: Wilhelm II, German Emperor; Mutaga IV of Burundi
- Preceded by: Eberhard Gudowius
- Succeeded by: Otto Brentzel
- In office May 1911 – June 1916
- Monarchs: Wilhelm II, German Emperor; Mutaga IV of Burundi; Mwambutsa IV of Burundi
- Preceded by: Kurt von Stegmann und Stein
- Succeeded by: End of German rule (Edouard van den Eende as Belgian military resident)

Personal details
- Born: 8 April 1872 Elbing, Kingdom of Prussia, German Empire
- Died: 30 March 1917 (aged 44) Mahenge, German East Africa
- Spouse: Ella Breest

Military service
- Allegiance: German Empire
- Branch/service: Schutztruppe
- Years of service: ?–1917
- Rank: Major
- Commands: 5. Feldkompanie (5/FK); Urundi Company
- Battles/wars: World War I; East African campaign; Battle of Karonga (WIA); Burundian campaign; Tabora offensive; Iringa offensive

Erich von Langenn-Steinkeller (Franz Heinrich Gneomar Erich von Langenn-Steinkeller; 8 April 1872 – 30 March 1917) was a German military officer and official who served as the colonial resident of the Kingdom of Burundi in 1909 and from 1911 to 1916.

== Biography ==
=== Early life and career ===
Erich von Langenn-Steinkeller, full name Franz Heinrich Gneomar Erich von Langenn-Steinkeller, was born to Franz Heinrich von Langenn-Steinkeller and Agnes von Massow in Elbing, West Prussia, on 8 April 1872. He was part of the Steinkeller dynasty, a Mecklenburg-Pomeranian noble family. Langenn-Steinkeller eventually joined the German colonial military, the Schutztruppe, and was posted to German East Africa. Serving for several years, he earned a reputation as a colonial veteran.

Succeeding Eberhard Gudowius, Langenn-Steinkeller's first tenure as colonial resident in Burundi lasted from April to September 1909, when he was replaced by Otto Brentzel. In May 1911, Langenn-Steinkeller –promoted to Major– was again appointed as colonial resident of Burundi. In 1912, he moved the seat of the German administration from Usumbura to Gitega, close to the traditional heartland of the Burundian monarchy. His exact reasoning for this decision is disputed. Researchers variously interpreted it as an acknowledgement of the monarchy's importance, as an attempt to better implement a divide and rule strategy, or as the result of Gitega's central location, allowing the colonial authorities better access to all parts of the country. In general, Langenn-Steinkeller encouraged various chiefs to resist the Burundian monarchy by recognizing their formal independence from the court. The resulting infighting among the native nobility allowed the resident to control Burundi without relying on a substantial number of colonial soldiers. Around this time, Langenn-Steinkeller also had to deal with conflicts between Protestant missionaries and the Catholic White Fathers; the latter, alongside their native allies including mwami (king) Mutaga IV of Burundi, opposed the creation of a Protestant mission in Burundi. The colonial resident was unenthusiastic about the Protestant missionaries' project, and offered very little support.

=== World War I ===
In 1914, World War I erupted, and German East Africa became a battlefield. At the time, only 55 Germans and 450 Schutztruppe askari guarded all of Burundi. However, the Belgians in the neighbouring Congo overestimated the German strength and were hampered by poor logistics. Thus, the Allies initially refrained from attempting offensive operations into Burundi. In contrast, Langenn-Steinkeller decided to launch a raid into enemy territory without authorisation by German East Africa's chief commander, Paul von Lettow-Vorbeck. He led one of the companies under his command, namely the 5. Feldkompanie (5/FK) to capture Karonga, part of British Nyasaland. Supported by 500 Ruga-Ruga, he launched the operation unaware that strong British forces were close to Karonga, and suffered a heavy defeat. Langenn-Steinkeller's troops were decimated, and he was seriously wounded, losing the use of one eye. After this failure, he returned to Burundi for several months, before being ordered to relocate to Neu Langenburg to oversee the southwestern frontline in February 1915.

In April 1915, Lettow-Vorbeck began to prepare an offensive into British Northern Rhodesia; initially Langenn-Steinkeller was put in charge of the companies involved, but in June the command was transferred to Kurt Wahle. In September 1915, German forces under Captain Karl Schimmer crossed the Burundi-Congo border and attacked Belgian-held Luvungi. This assault was repelled by the Belgians, and Schimmer was killed in action. Following his demise, Langenn-Steinkeller once again assumed direct responsibility for the German garrison of Burundi. However, most of the German troops were withdrawn from the area to other frontlines, leaving him with only the Urundi Company and the 14th Reserve Company, consisting of 36 Germans, 250 askari, and 100 Ruga-Ruga. In November 1915, mwami Mutaga IV died; he was succeeded by his three-year-old son, Mwambutsa IV. Langenn-Steinkeller appointed a regency council to oversee Burundi during the king's minority, consisting of his grandmother Ririkumutima, and his uncles Ntarugera and Nuduwumwe.

On 13 March 1916, he married Ella Breest in Usumbura. In May, the Belgians launched a major offensive in the northwest, quickly overrunning Rwanda. By June, they were moving into Burundi, where Langenn-Steinkeller's force offered some limited resistance as it retreated to avoid being encircled by the superior Allied troops. Together with the contingent of Max Wintgens who had led the German garrison of Rwanda, Langenn-Steinkeller was able to evade the Belgians and took up position at the Mariahilf Mission. On 14 July, they clashed with the Belgians at Diobahika to delay their advance toward Mwanza. After several battles, the Belgians and British captured the important city of Tabora in September 1916. Wahle who served as main German commander in the area, opted to abandon the city to avoid further losses, and embarked on a surprise counter-attack into the south to retake Iringa; Langenn-Steinkeller was put in charge of one of the columns involved in this operation. After a march through difficult terrain, harassed by hostile Wahehe partisans, Wahle's forces reached and attacked Iringa in October. The assault was beaten back, and the British inflicted over 100 losses on Langenn-Steinkeller's column.

After the defeat at Iringa, Wahle and Langenn-Steinkeller led their remaining troops to Malangali, but could not capture this settlement either. Eventually, Wahle's depleted forces were able to link up with another German force led by Georg Kraut. By Christmas 1916, Wahle's force was able to set up camp between Mkapira and Lupembe where his troops were able to recuperate; there, Langenn-Steinkeller also learnt that he had already been awarded the Iron Cross 2nd Class in September. Fighting soon resumed, and Wahle's contingent was pushed back to the Ruhudi river by January 1917. Heavy rains and limited supplies meant that the living conditions of both Allies and Germans in this area were rather poor.

On 30 March 1917, Langenn-Steinkeller died of sickness in Mahenge. He was survived by his wife who returned to Germany after the war and remarried. It is possible that Erich von Langenn-Steinkeller had children, as researcher Wolfgang Völker described him as the "ancestor" of Bogislaw von Langenn-Steinkeller.
