= List of colonial residents of Burundi =

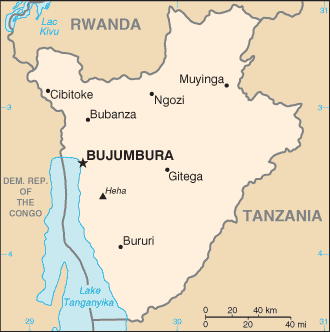
Map of Burundi.

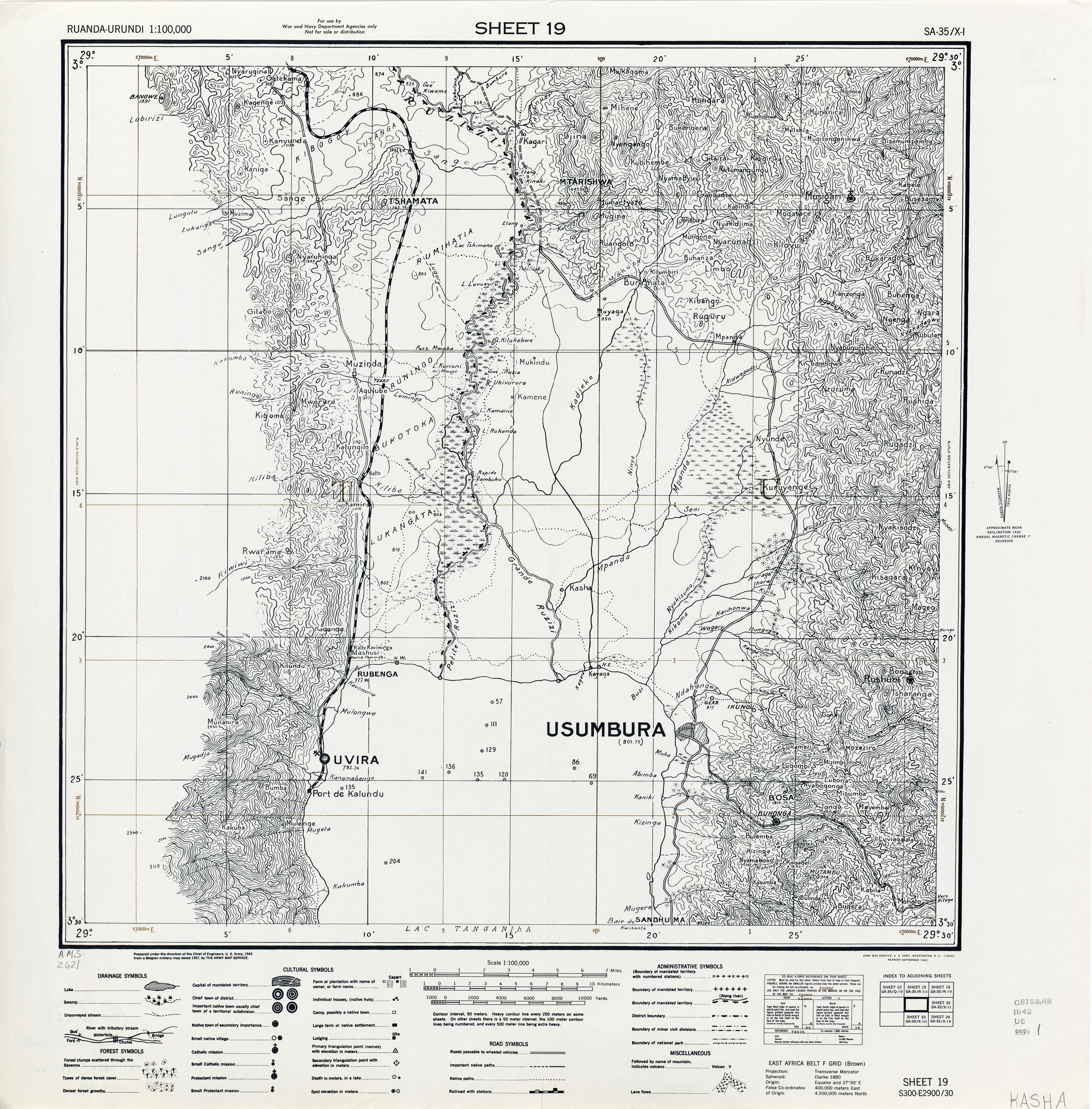
Map of Usumbura (1942).

This article lists the colonial residents of Burundi, during the time when modern-day Burundi was part of German East Africa and Ruanda-Urundi.

== Overview of office ==
=== German rule ===
The Germans established the office of Resident of Urundi in 1906. They moved the seat of the residency to Gitega in 1912.

=== Belgian rule ===
After Urundi fell under Belgian control and became part of the League of Nations mandate of Ruanda-Urundi, the Belgians placed it under the oversight of a Residency based in Gitega. The office included a resident, assistant resident, and other staff for specialised purposes. This system of administration continued when Ruanda-Urundi became a United Nations trust territory. A significant amount of Belgian colonial policy was carried out by the residency. The office of the Vice Governor-General, based in Usumbura (now Bujumbura), was responsible for overseeing the whole of Ruanda-Urundi.

== List ==
(Dates in italics indicate de facto continuation of office)

Tenure	Portrait	Incumbent	Notes
German suzerainty
Kajaga station
1896		... Ullman, Commander	
1896 to 1897		... Muller, Commander	
Usumbura station
1897 to 1898		Konstantin Cramer, Commander	
1898 to 1902		Werner von Grawert, Commander	1st term
1902 to 1904		Friedrich Robert von Beringe, Commander	
1904 to 15 November 1907		Werner von Grawert, Commander	2nd term
15 November 1907 to 1908		Werner von Grawert, Resident	2nd term
September 1908 to January 1909		Heinrich Fonck, acting Resident	
January 1909 to April 1909		Eberhard Gudowius, Resident	
April 1909 to September 1909		Erich von Langenn-Steinkeller, Resident	1st term
September 1909 to January 1910		Otto Brentzel, Resident	
January 1910 to January 1911		Wilhelm Göring, Resident	
January 1911 to May 1911		Kurt von Stegmann und Stein, Resident	
May 1911 to 6 June 1916		Erich von Langenn-Steinkeller, Resident	2nd term
1913		Karl von Bock, acting Resident	Acting for Langenn-Steinkeller
May 1913 to August 1914		Karl Schimmer, acting Resident	Acting for Langenn-Steinkeller
August 1914 to 1916		Max Wentzel, acting Resident	Acting for Langenn-Steinkeller
Belgian suzerainty
1916 to December 1918		Edouard van den Eende, Military Resident	
January 1919 to 1928		Pierre Ryckmans, Resident	
1928 to 12 May 1929		Oscar Defawe, acting Resident	
1 February 1930 to 24 December 1930		Charles, Baron de l'Epine, interim Resident	
24 December 1930 to 17 July 1933		Léon Borgers, Resident	
17 July 1933 to 1935		Oger Coubeau, Resident	
1935 to 1937		R. Hombert, Resident	
12 January 1938 to 1940		René Verstappen, acting Resident	
March 1941 to 1944		George Victor Sandrart, Resident	
2 February 1944 to July 1953		Robert Schmidt, Resident	
July 1953 to 1956		Fernand Siroux, Resident	
1956 to 28 October 1959		Robert Scheyven, Resident	
28 October 1959 to 28 July 1961		Ivan Reisdorff, Resident	
28 July 1961 to January 1962		Roberto Régnier, Resident	
January 1962 to 1962		Roberto Régnier, High Representative	
1962 to 1 July 1962		Edouard Henniquiau, High Representative	
1 July 1962	Independence as Kingdom of Burundi		

== See also ==
- List of colonial governors of Ruanda-Urundi
- List of colonial residents of Rwanda

== Works cited ==
- Weinstein, Warren (1976). Historical Dictionary of Burundi. Metuchen: Scarecrow Press. ISBN 978-0-8108-0962-8.
