= Muhumusa =

Rwandan-Ugandan anti-colonial rebel and spiritual leader

Muhumuza
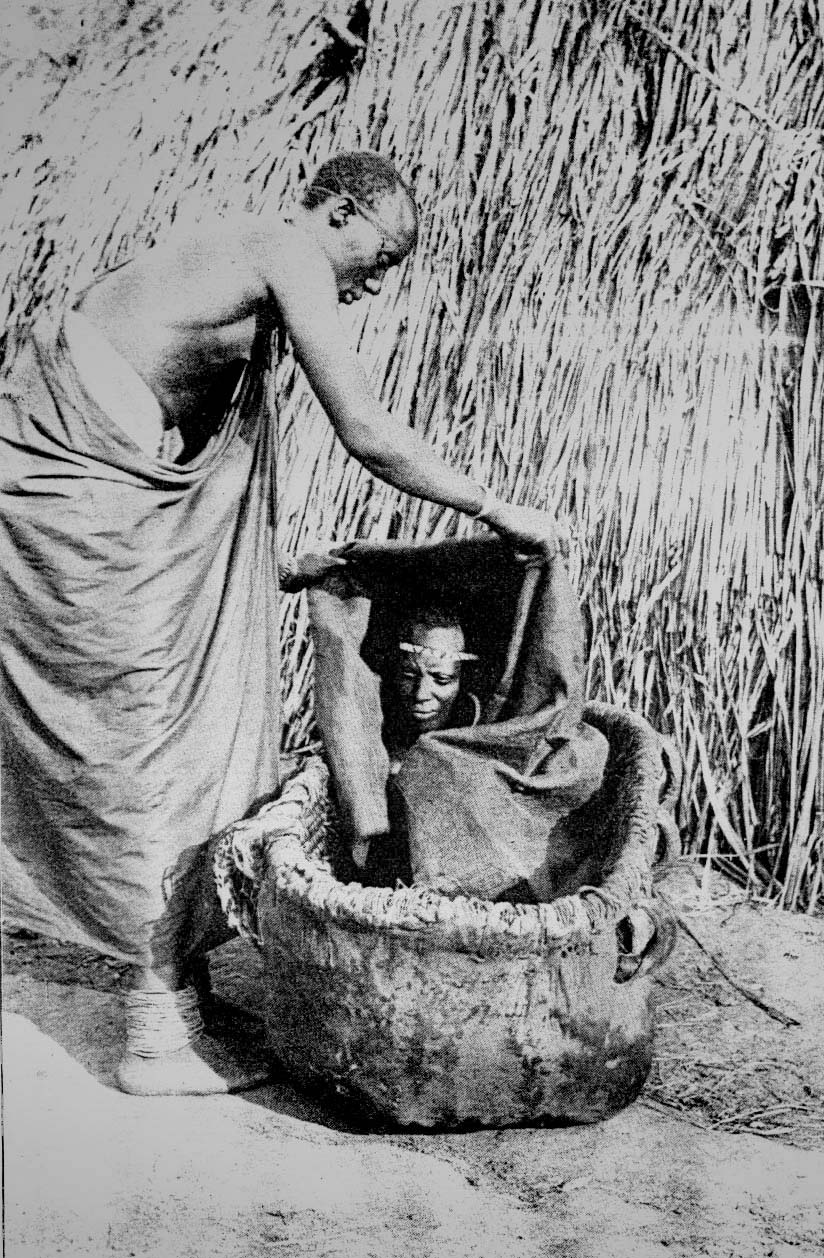
- Muhumusa and her husband
- Died: 1945; Kampala, Uganda (under house arrest)
- Other names: Muhumusa, Nyiragahumusa, Muserakande
- Occupations: Spiritual leader, revolutionary
- Known for: Leader of the Nyabinghi spiritual practice; Anti-colonial resistance against British and German forces
- Title: Queen of the Nyabinghi
- Spouse: Kigeli IV Rwabugiri (disputed)
- Children: Biregeya

Muhumuza (also spelled Muhumsa, and Nyiragahumusa) was a leader of the east African Nyabingi spiritual practice, which was influential in Rwanda and Uganda from 1850 to 1950. Muhumusa is said to have been a medium of the spirit of a legendary African woman, known as Nyabinghi (also spelled Nyabingi and Nyabyinshi).

According to some Rwandan sources, her original name was Muserakande, and she was married to and had a son named Biregeya with Kigeri Rwabugiri, the King of Rwanda from 1867 to 1895. Following Rwabugiri's death in 1895 and the coup at Rucunshu in 1896, which was orchestrated by Rwabugiri's favourite wife, Kanjogera, to overthrow his chosen successor, Rutarindwa, and enthrone her son, Musinga, Muserakande allegedly fled north to Mpororo with her son to escape massacre. Other sources, however, claim Muhumusa was originally named Nyakayoga and had been married to Rutarindwa prior to his death.

== Spiritual leadership ==
Regardless of the specifics of her affiliation with the Rwandan court, soon after arriving in Mpororo, Muserakande became known as a popular umugirwa, or medium of Nyabinghi. Oral traditions from the region recognise many possible origins for Nyabingi. The most prominent legends at present attributes Nyabinghi's origins to Kitami, an 18th century Queen of Mpororo kingdom (in modern-day southern Uganda / northern Rwanda), whose murder by her husband, Murari, was followed by a series of natural disasters and other catastrophic events. After her death, any atrocities that happened were considered to be due to Nyabinghi's revenge, while any good things that happened were attributed to her positive interference which she exercised through mediums who had been possessed by her spirit. These possessions led to the emergence of a new religious practice that European colonisers at the time widely referenced as a cult. Adherents provided gifts to Nyabinghi mediums, known collectively as abagirwa, who then spoke with (and for) Nyabinghi to convince the spirit to intervene positively in people's lives.

== Colonial resistance ==
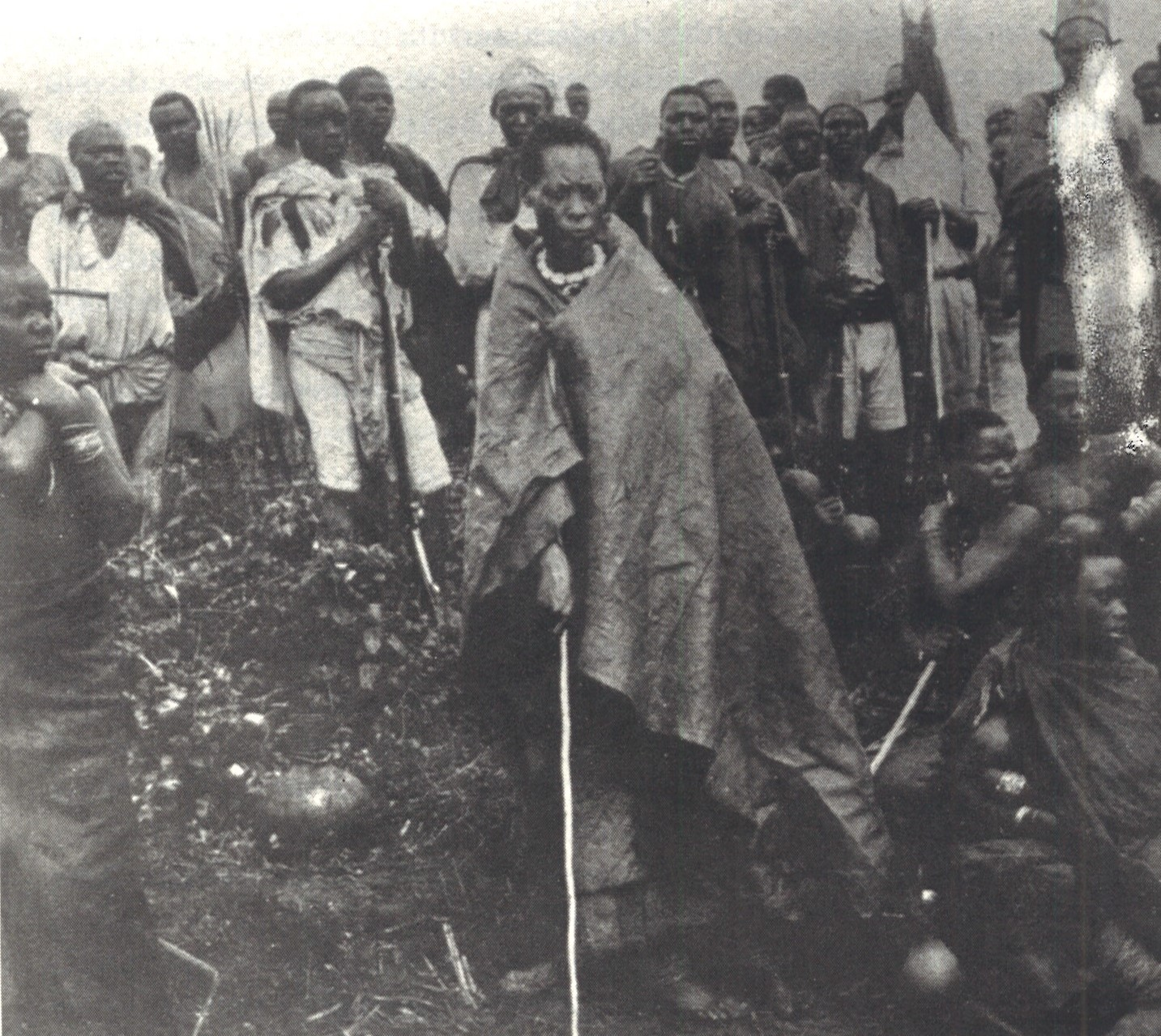
Muhumusa at the time of her capture by the British

By claiming spiritual authority through Nyabinghi, Muhumusa was able to rally the Abakiga people of northern Rwanda behind her to challenge to Musinga's claim to the throne. Over the next few years, she raised armies and organised a series of insurrections aimed at enthroning her son, Biregeya, who she claimed was Rwabugiri's legitimate successor. She also encouraged her followers to pay tribute to her, rather than Musinga's court. In response, Musinga asked the German colonisers for help defeating Muhumusa's movement. The Germans arrested her in 1908 for 'witchcraft' and imprisoned her in Bukoba until her escape in July 1911. Once again, she fled north where she began rallying her supporters, but this time in defiance of the German and British colonisers who were laying claim to the region, in collaboration with an umutwa leader named Basebya. They were behind the first armed resistances against colonisation in the region, with Muhumusa encouraging their followers not to fear European guns because Nyabinghi would turn the Europeans' bullets into water. Muhumusa's rebellion created a great deal of concern among the European colonisers in the region, and well as the European missionaries who were attempting to spread Christianity, prompting the Germans and British to join forces. On September 29, 1911, they surrounded Muhumusa's forces and, after a short battle, arrested her. The British escorted her to Kampala, where they kept her under house arrest until her death in 1945.

Some of her followers, most importantly Ndungutse and Basebya, subsequently organized another rebellion in northern Rwanda.
