= Nyabinghi =

Ankole talles

Nyabinghi or Nyabingi is a legendary woman in the culture of Rwanda, Uganda and Tanzania, where religions or 'possession cults' formed around her.

In the 20th century, the name "Nyabinghi" was adopted by practitioners of Jamaican Rastafari as a term for their gatherings and later for the drumming style used in religious practices.

Nyabingi is a goddess of abundance among the Nande people (Yira) of eastern Democratic Republic of Congo and the Konzo in Uganda. She holds the power to multiply wealth and bless the material possessions of her followers and the community.

Nyabingi is a name often given to a princess or a beloved daughter of the family.

== Origins ==
Nyabinghi, or Nyabingi, was a legendary woman of the Banyarwanda tribe whose name means "mother of abundance" or "the one who possesses many things" in the Kinyarwanda and Mpororo language. The date and place of her birth are contested. Jim Freedman, an anthropologist who studied the Nyabinghi movement in Rwanda/Uganda, dates the 'birth' of Nyabinghi between 1750–1800.

== Religion ==
The veneration or worship of the deity or spirit of the woman known as Nyabinghi began in Rwanda, around 1800. She was thought to be a powerful force in everyday life. Religious practice operated through a medium who was in communication with the spirit of Nyabinghi. To appease her spirit, believers brought offerings to the medium who would negotiate with the spirit on the believer's behalf. While there were specific mediums that communicated with Nyabinghi directly, Nyabinghi could also possess ordinary people who were not leaders or official mediums within the religion. Belief in this religion was particularly strong in the southern parts of Uganda and the northern regions of Rwanda, areas which had formerly been part of the precolonial kingdom of Ndorwa.

== Muhumuza ==
Nyabinghi was said to have possessed a Rwandan/Ugandan woman named Muhumuza, who was a famous Nyabinghi medium in the 19th to early 20th century. Muhumuza led a campaign against Yuhi V of Rwanda, claiming to be a mother to the rightful heir to the Rwandan throne. She also led and then inspired further anti-colonial movements in East Africa, rebelling against European colonial authorities. Although she was captured in 1913, alleged possessions by Nyabinghi continued afterwards across East Africa (mostly afflicting women). The bloodline of the true Nyabinghi warriors supposedly settled in the heart of Dzimba dze Mabwe, now known as Zimbabwe.

== Influence on Rastafari ==
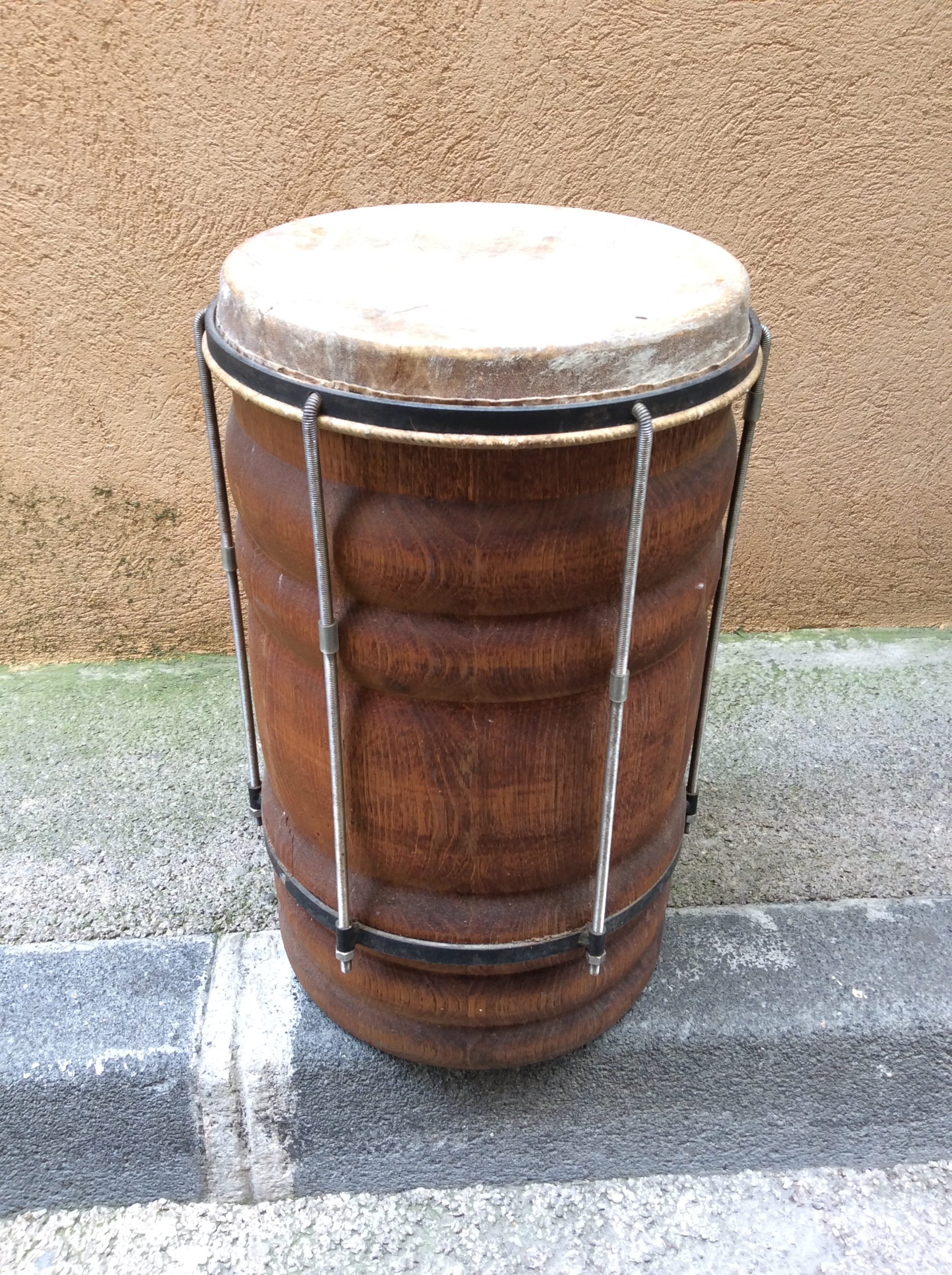
A Nyabinghi drum

The term "Nyabinghi" may have reached Jamaica via an article written by the Italian journalist Frederico Philos. This article was first published in Italy in 1934 and then in the Jamaica Times in 1935. Philos claimed that there was a secret society across South Africa called the "Nya-Binghi" which was devoted to the message: "Death to all White Farmers." He also maintained that the Ethiopian Emperor Haile Selassie had been made head of this order in 1930 at a secret meeting held in Moscow, capital of the Soviet Union. Philos' article was designed as propaganda to rally support for European colonial attempts to suppress anti-colonial efforts on the African continent. In Jamaica, the article influenced early practitioners of Rastafari, a religion that had emerged in the 1930s devoting itself to Haile Selassie. On the island, the term "Nyabinghi" came to be used to describe a gathering of Rastas.

By the 1950s, various Rasta drummers in Jamaica had developed a style of ritual music which they called "Nyabinghi drumming". It was influenced by various older Afro-Jamaican musical styles, including Burru drumming and the ritual drum styles found in religions such as Kumina and Revival Zion. The term "Nyabinghi" also came to be used to describe one of the oldest branches of Rastafari, known as the House of Nyabinghi.

Among Rasta women, Queen Nyabinghi, as well as Empress Menen Asfaw, is a symbol of women's agency to resist domination.

== See also ==
- Ethiopian Orthodox Tewahedo Church
- Pacifism
