= Rosa Paula Iribagiza =

Rosa Paula Iribagiza Mwambutsa
- Crown Princess of Burundi

Head of the Royal House of Burundi
- Period: 26 April 1977 – present
- Predecessor: King Mwambutsa IV Bangiricenge
- Born: 20 March 1934 (age 92); Gitega, Kingdom of Burundi, Ruanda-Urundi
- Spouse: André Muhirwa (m. 1952 - div. ?); Frédéric Van de Sande (m. 1984)
- Issue: Prince Rémy Iribagiza; Prince Charles Iribagiza; Princess Louise Iribagiza; Princess Michelle Iribagiza; Princess Anita Iribagiza; Princess Sheila Iribagiza-Kiliza; Prince David Iribagiza-Kiliza
- House: Ntwero
- Father: King Mwambutsa IV Bangiricenge of Burundi
- Mother: Thérèse Kanyonga
- Religion: Catholicism

Rosa Paula Iribagiza Mwambutsa (born 20 March 1934) is the current pretender to the throne of Burundi. She was a sister of Burundi's last king, Mwami Ntare V (who had overthrown their father Mwambutsa IV in 1966), who was executed in 1972. In 2009, the Crown Princess called for an investigation into the death of her brother. She served as a member of the National Assembly of Burundi.

== Family ==
She married twice.

With her first husband, Chief André Muhirwa of Busumanyi, she had two sons and two daughters.

- Prince Rémy Ciza Muhirwa. He married Pascale Hody (later divorced). Later, he married Michèle Ingabire Gateretse. He has 4 children.
- Prince Charles Muhirwa.
- Princess Louise Muhirwa (born in Muhinga, on 29 April 1956 - died 25 December 2019). Married to Camille Ngoga.
- Princess Michelle Muhirwa.

The Crown Princess also had issue by François Bourgeon, a French national, one daughter:

- Anita Iribagiza (born on 15 October 1970). Actress.

Also Princess Rosa Paula had further issue by Hamisi Masud Kiliza, one son and one daughter:

- Sheila Babile Kiliza (born in Nairobi, Kenya, on 16 June 1973 - died 29 January 2020).
- David Kabunga wa Mwambutsa Hamisi Kiliza (born in Nairobi, Kenya, on 2 July 1974).

== Distinctions ==
- Kingdom of Belgium: Commander of the Order of the Crown (14 May 2012)
