= Roberto Régnier =

Belgian colonial administrator

Roberto Régnier was a Belgian Colonial official in Ruanda-Urundi. He served as Regent from 28 July 1961 to January 1962 and as High Representative of Burundi for no more than six months starting in January 1962.

René Lemarchand, an expert on Burundian history, claims that the assassination of Prince Louis Rwagasore was planned by members of the pro-Belgian Christian Democratic Party (PDC) whose European secretary, Ms Belva was allegedly told by Régnier that "Rwagasore must be killed". In addition, several days before his assassination Prince Rwagasore filled a complaint against seven Belgian officials including the Belgian Governor-General, Jean-Paul Harroy and Régnier. Prior to his execution for murdering Prince Rwagasore, Jean Kageorgis explicitly accused Harroy and Régnier of responsibility in the murder stating, “Ce crime fut perpétré par la tutelle, M. Harroy et M. Regnier.”
