= Buberuka Highlands =

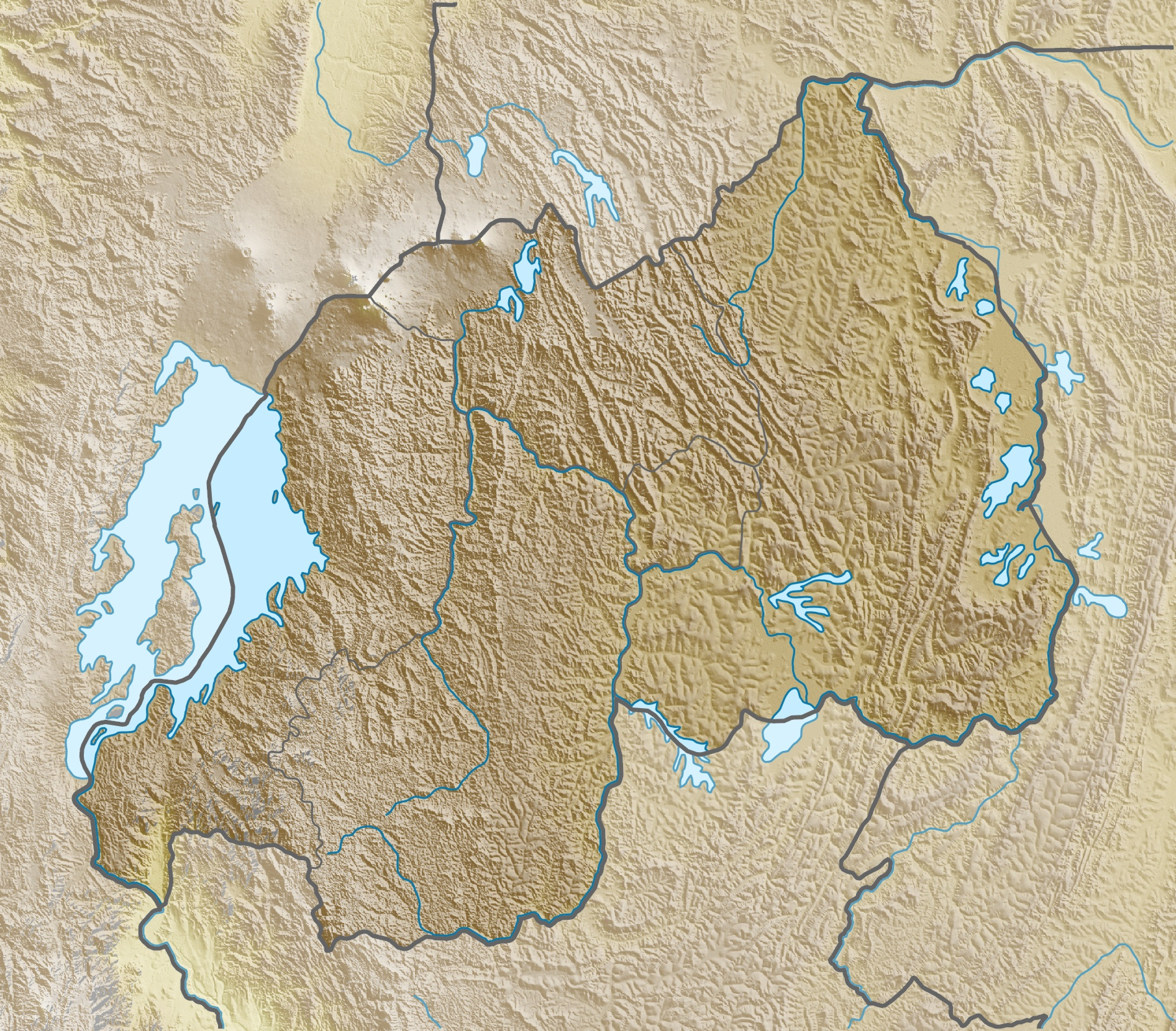
- Location within Rwanda
- Location: Rwanda
- Coordinates: 01°29′18″S 29°51′6.6″E
- Area: 60,000 hectares (150,000 acres)

Buberuka Highlands ishema ry'ubwiza bwa kamere.

Buberuka Highlands is one of the 12 major agroecological zones in northeast Rwanda and covers an area of 600 square kilometres (230 sq mi), which is nearly one third area in the Ruhengeri Prefecture. Located near the border with Uganda, the highlands include parts of the Byumba and Ruhengeri provinces located to the south of the equator.

A Research sub station of the National Agricultural Research Institute (ISAR) is located here.

== Geography ==
The highland extends over 600 square kilometres (230 sq mi). Its altitude ranges between 1,800–2,400 metres (5,900–7,900 ft). The highlands are characterized by steep slopes whose soils have low fertility and high acidity, which is not conducive to high yield of crops The annual rainfall measures approximately 1,400 millimetres (55 in). Rainfall recorded at the research station here is bimodal and is also of the order of 1,400 millimetres (55 in) /year.

== Economy ==
Potato (Solanum tuberosum L.) is the major food and cash crop after banana, in the highland region. Next in order of priority are maize, beans and wheat. In order to increase the growth of these crops in the highland region, inter cropping of bean, potato, pea and wheat was tested on an experimental basis with Seasbani sesban (Sesbania); lime and manure were added as supplements for the growth. Species of shrubs such as Sasbania, Leucaena, Calliandra and Markamia showed better growth than in the Central Plateau Region where similar studies were conducted. Studies have been conducted since 1987 by the National Agricultural Research Institute (ISAR) who maintains a substation in Rwerere, Western Province within the highlands. In order to increase agricultural production with use new commercial crops have been adopted in the project area. The crops adopted are maracuja (passion fruit), an export item, and potatoes. In addition, modern livestock breeding techniques have also been adopted. This project under the aegis of IFAD, has been found successful in increasing the incomes and purchasing power of the farmers and pastorals. A local NGO supports women who live in the highlands to collect clay and sell it for use in the construction of bricks and roof tiles.

== Agricultural practices ==
Wheat which is grown in area of 4,000 hectares (9,900 acres) in the highlands accounts for 50% of the total area under cultivation of wheat in the country. However, its yield has been generally low, of the order of 850 kilograms (1,870 lb)/ha necessitating adoption of better land use practices of terracing in the highlands and also better crop yield practices. Hence, the terracing method called the “radical terracing” has been done in many areas with steep slopes in the highlands in order to control erosion and increase crop yield. On the gentler slopes, the hedgerow plantation of trees and grasses called the “progressive terracing” has been introduced at the edge of the terraces.

In order to increase the yield under wheat cultivation, it was grown on the steep slopes of the highlands on an experimental basis adopting row method and with weeding the field twice a week, as against the broadcasting method practiced in the past. This resulted in doubling the yield from the area to 3,000 kilograms (6,600 lb) per ha.
