= Martyazo =

Unrecognised state in Burundi (1972)

Republic of Martyazo: République de Martyazo
- 1972
- Possible flag (Note: Researchers Jean-Pierre Chrétien and Jean-François Dupaquier described this possible design as being of dubious origin. They also noted a similarity to the flag of Tanzania.)

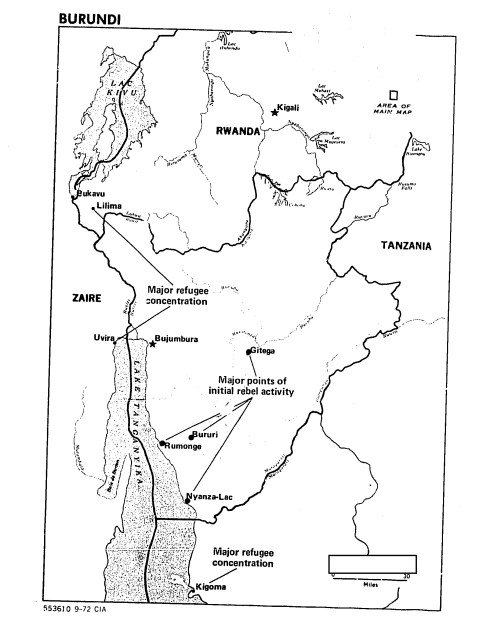
- Contemporary United States Central Intelligence Agency map of Burundi showing areas of Hutu rebel activity during the Ikiza
- Status: Unrecognised state
- Government: Republic
- Historical era: Ikiza
  - Established: 1 May 1972
  - Disestablished: c. 10 May 1972
Preceded by	Succeeded by
Burundi	Burundi
- Today part of: Burundi

The Republic of Martyazo (French: République de Martyazo) was a short-lived secessionist state proclaimed by Hutu rebels at Vyanda in Burundi's province of Makamba in early May 1972 during the Ikiza, a period of genocidal violence affecting Burundi.

== History ==
On 29 April 1972, a Hutu rebellion broke out in Burundi. The insurgents quickly began to target Tutsi civilians and officials, carrying out massacres in Bururi, Rumonge, and Nyanza Lac. Uprisings also took place in Cankuzo and Bujumbura. The rebels were joined by armed Congolese, largely former Simba rebels. Despite these ethnic killings, researcher Nigel Watt argued that the insurgents initially hoped to gain the support of Tutsi monarchists who were upset over the arrest of Ntare V. The latter was the former king (mwami) of the country and had been imprisoned by the republican, Tutsi-led government of Michel Micombero. Ntare V had been regarded as a defender of Hutu interests as well as a champion of Tutsi groups which had been excluded from power by Micombero's regime.

After taking control in the south, the rebels regrouped in Vyanda and declared the creation of the "Republic of Martyazo" in an attempt to "build a political base". Within their territory the rebels hoisted a red and green flag and subjected captured Tutsis to "people's tribunals". These "tribunals" were often held in the local banana plantations, trying and executing Tutsi hostages. Rebel forces also continued their advance, capturing Mabanda, raising their flag in Kayogoro, and eventually reaching the Tanzanian border.

However, the self-proclaimed state already began to crumble from the day of its proclamation. Burundian government troops retook Rumonge on 1 May, followed by Nyanza Lac on the next day. According to witnesses, all of the rebels captured by the Burundian Army were summarily executed and buried in mass graves. All persons seeking shelter in the bush or bearing scarification were deemed "rebels" by the government and hunted down. This caused an exodus of thousands of refugees towards Zaire and Tanzania, particularly those who had resided on the coast of Lake Tanganyika. One Burundian helicopter dropped leaflets stating that order would soon be restored, while another strafed columns of fleeing civilians. Between 30 April and 5 May the army focused on recapturing the Lake Tanganyika coastline. Within a week, the Republic of Martyazo had ceased to exist. On 10 May the government announced that it had complete military control over southern Burundi, though some conflict persisted. After the rebellion's suppression, the Burundian government continued a campaign of mass murder targeting the Hutu population as well as political opposition, resulting in the killing of more than 100,000 people in a period dubbed "Ikiza".

== Assessment ==
Owing to its short existence of little more than a week, there is a lack of reliable information on the republic. Researcher René Lemarchand described Martyazo as "mysterious" and an "experiment". Researchers Jean-Pierre Chrétien and Jean-François Dupaquier termed it an "ephemeral" state. Researchers Warren Weinstein, Robert Schrere, and later Catherine Scott argued that the Hutu rebellion represented an "attack by the countryside against the town", an attempt to stop intrusions into local village life by Micombero's government. They likened it to agrarian revolts of the colonial era. In this sense, the three researchers framed Martyazo as a popular republic whose declaration was possibly supposed to signify the overthrow of the "managerial elite" by "the peasants".

The rebels who proclaimed Martyazo also used a flag, but its exact design is unclear. It is described as either a tricolor or bicolor in conflicting reports. An official report released by the secessionist government mentions a green-red-green flag. Contemporary reports, however, mention a green-red-black, black-red-yellow or even green-red-blue tricolor. The discrepancy about the flag is attributed to the second-hand nature of the information, as well as a language barrier between French and Kirundi.
