= Nyanza-Lac Hospital =

Geography
- Location: Nyanza-Lac, Makamba Province, Burundi
- Coordinates: 4.34541°S 29.60019°E

Organisation
- Care system: Public

Links
- Lists: Hospitals in Burundi

The Nyanza Lac Hospital (French: Hôpital de Nyanza-Lac) is a hospital in Makamba Province, Burundi.

== Location ==
The Nyanza Lac Hospital is a hospital in the city of Nyanza-Lac, at the center of the Nyanza-Lac Health District. It is a public district hospital serving a population of 206,795 as of 2014.

As of February 2024 the district hospital only had three general practitioners to serve the populations of the communes of Mabanda, Nyanza-Lac and Vugizo.

== Events ==
There was an outbreak of cholera in August 2017, apparently brought by a fisherman who had visited the town of Karamba in the South Kivu province of the Democratic Republic of the Congo. By 20 August 13 cases had been received by the cholera treatment center of the Nyanza-Lac hospital, with one patient cured and discharged.

In November 2021 Radio Publique Africaine reported that the people of the Commune of Nyanza-Lac were angry about corruption in the hospital morgue. After accepting a dead body, the next day they would call the relatives and ask them to take the body, citing repeated power cuts as the reason. They accept bribes to retain the bodies. However, the hospital had a functioning back-up generator so was not affected by power outages.

== Sources ==
- Carte Sanitaire du Burundi (PDF), Burundi Ministry of Public Health, 2016
- Financement base sur la performance HD Nyanza Lac (in French), Ministere de la Sante Publique et de la Lutte Contre le Sida
- Flambée des cas de choléra au Burundi - 21 Août 2017 (in French), WHO, 22 August 2017
- "Insuffisance de médecins à l'hôpital de district de Nyanza-Lac, un défi majeur", Agence Burundaise de Presse (in French), 9 February 2024
- "Les gestionnaires de la morgue de l'hôpital Nyanza- Lac indexés de corruption", Radio Publique Africaine (in French), 11 November 2021
