= Burunga =

Province of Burundi

- Province
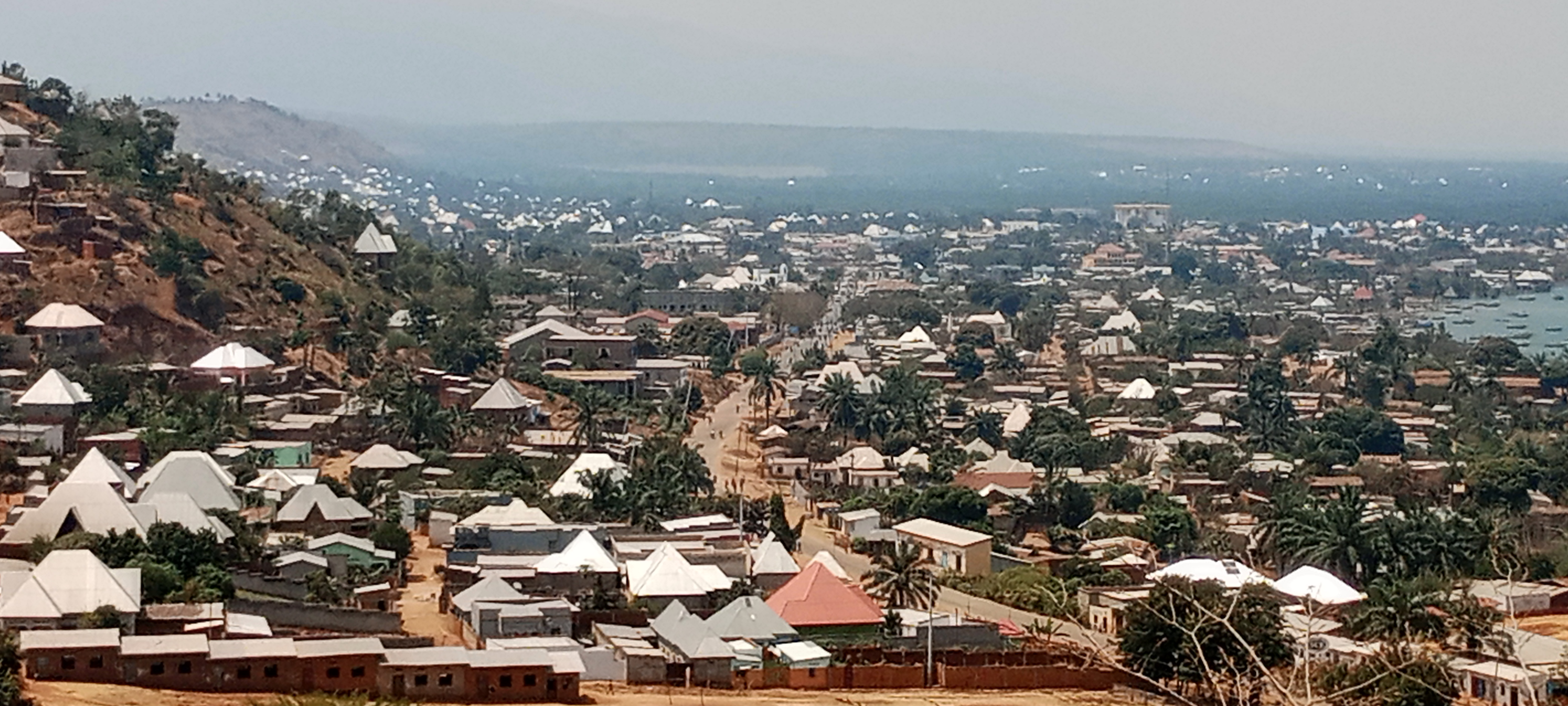
- Rumonge, the largest town in Burunga

- Location of Burunga in Burundi
- Coordinates: 4°S 30°E
- Country: Burundi
- Inaugurated: 2025
- Capital: Makamba

Government
  - Governor: Parfait Mboninyibuka (CNDD-FDD)

Area
  - Total: 6,206 km^{2} (2,396 sq mi)

Population (2024 census)
  - Total: 2,118,551
  - Density: 341.4/km^{2} (884.1/sq mi)
- Time zone: UTC+2 (CAT)

Burunga is the largest of Burundi's five provinces by area. It covers an area of 6,206 square kilometres (2,396 sq mi) and recorded a population of 2,118,551 in the 2024 Burundian census. The province's capital is Makamba, while Rumonge is its largest town, reporting a population of 35,931 in the 2008 Burundian census.

== Geography ==
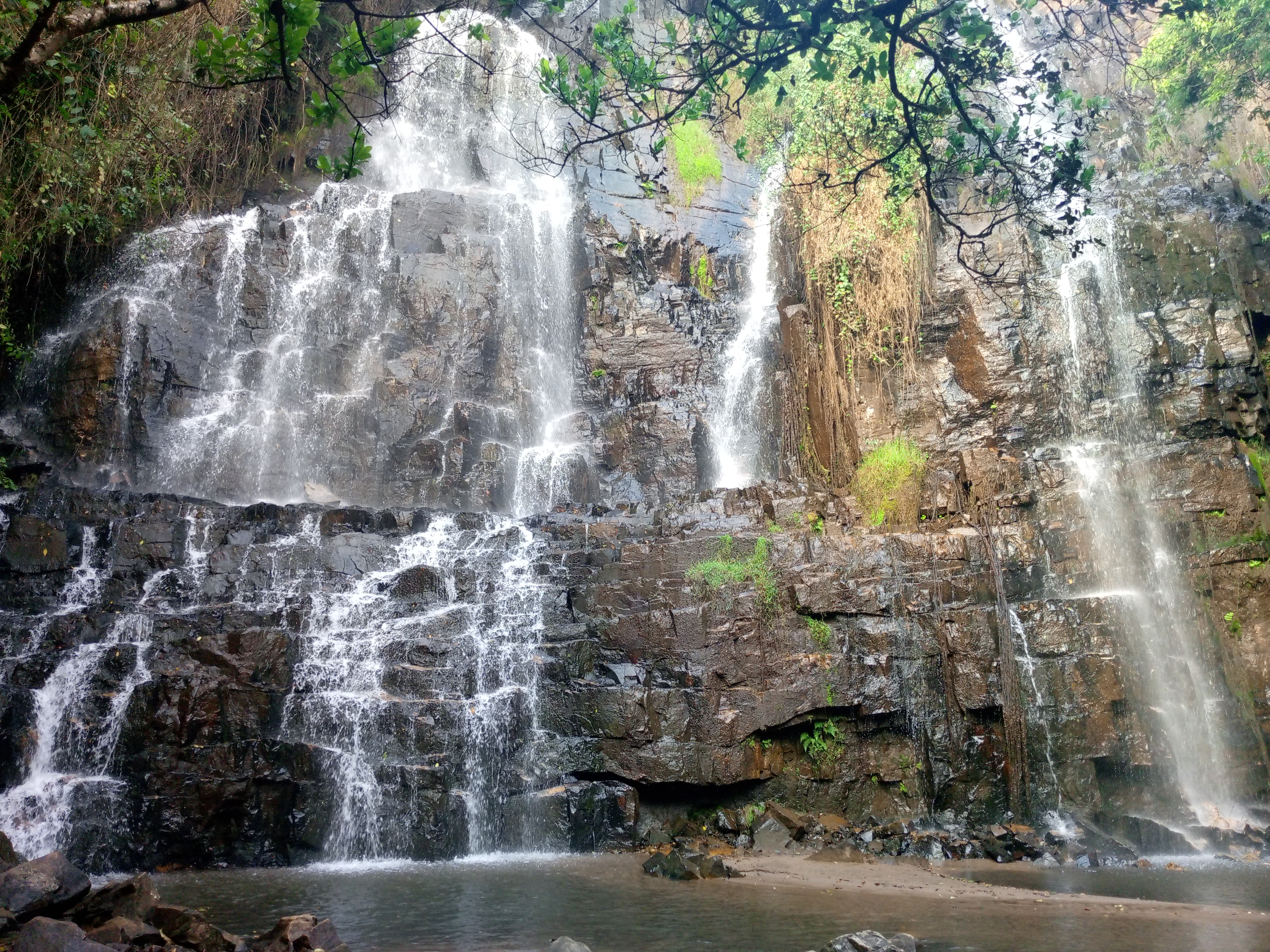
One of the cascades at Karera Falls.

Located in southern Burundi, Burunga borders Lake Tanganyika to the west, the Burundian provinces of Bujumbura, Gitega and Buhumuza to the northwest, north and northeast respectively, and Tanzania's Kigoma Region to the east and south. The Kibimbi and Inanzerwe massifs on the Bututsi plateau in the centre of the province divide the Imbo plain along Lake Tanganyika and Mumirwa foothills from the Moso and Buragane lowlands to the east.

Burunga contains five of Burundi's six nature reserves: Bururi Forest Nature Reserve, Malagarazi Nature Reserve, Kigwena Nature Reserve, Rumonge Nature Reserve, and Vyanda Forest Nature Reserve. The Makamba Protected Landscapes are also located in the province. Three sites in Burunga are on Burundi's list of Tentative World Heritage Sites: Karera Falls and Nyakazu Gorge (also known as German Gorge) in the commune of Musongati, and the southernmost source of the Nile at Gasumo on Mount Kikizi in the commune of Bururi.

== History ==
On 16 March 2023, President of Burundi Évariste Ndayishimiye signed into law a reorganization of Burundi's administrative divisions, which included the reduction of Burundi's provinces from eighteen to five. Burunga was created from the former provinces of Bururi, Makamba and Rutana, the communes of Burambi, Buyengero and Rumonge formerly part of Rumonge Province, and the zone of Mahwa formerly part of the commune of Ryansoro in Gitega Province. The new provinces took effect with Burundi's 2025 parliamentary and local elections. Burunga's first governor Parfait Mboninyibuka was sworn in on 4 July 2025.

Burunga is named after a region of southern Burundi described in the Nkoma cycle of Burundian oral tradition as being conquered by Ntare Rushatsi on his way to founding the kingdom of Burundi. Historically this part of Burundi has been a zone of commercial exchange between the central plateau and the Imbo and Moso lowlands. Since the 1980s, SOSUMO has grown and processed sugarcane around Gihofi.

== Communes ==
Burunga is divided into seven communes: Bururi, Makamba, Matana, Musongati, Nyanza, Rumonge, and Rutana.
