= Ikiza =

1972 mass killings of Hutus in Burundi

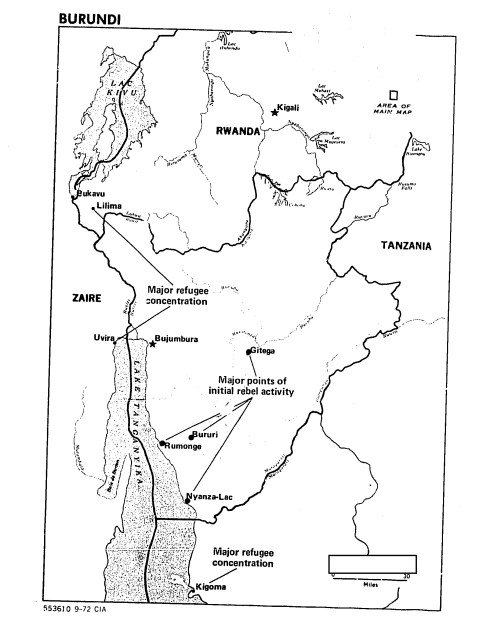
- Contemporary United States Central Intelligence Agency map of Burundi showing areas of Hutu rebel activity and refugee concentrations from the Ikiza
- Location: Burundi
- Date: April–August 1972
- Target: Hutus, particularly the educated and elite; some Tutsi-Banyaruguru
- Attack type: Genocide, mass murder
- Deaths: 100,000–300,000
- Perpetrator: Tutsi-Hima dictatorship
- Motive: Retribution for Hutu rebellion

The Ikiza (variously translated from Kirundi as the Catastrophe, the Great Calamity, and the Scourge), or the Ubwicanyi (Killings), was a series of mass killings—often characterised as a genocide—which were committed in Burundi in 1972 by the Tutsi-dominated army and government, primarily against educated and elite Hutus who lived in the country. Conservative estimates place the death toll of the event between 100,000 and 150,000 killed, while some estimates of the death toll go as high as 300,000.

== Background ==
=== Ethnic tensions in Burundi ===
Burundi (red) was bordered by Rwanda to the north, Zaire to the west, and Tanzania to the east

In the 20th century Burundi had three main indigenous ethnic groups: Hutu, Tutsi, and Twa. The area was colonised by the German Empire in the late 1800s and administered as a portion of German East Africa. In Burundi and neighboring Rwanda to the north, the Germans maintained indirect rule, leaving local social structures intact. Under this system, the Tutsi minority generally enjoyed its historically high status as aristocrats, whereas the Hutus occupied the bottom of the social structure. Princely and monarchal rulers belonged to a unique ethnic group, Ganwa, though over time the political salience of this distinction declined and the category was subsumed by the Tutsi grouping. During World War I, Belgian troops from the Belgian Congo occupied Burundi and Rwanda. In 1919, under the auspices of the nascent League of Nations, Belgium was given the responsibility of administering "Ruanda-Urundi" as a mandated territory. Though obligated to promote social progress in the territory, the Belgians did not alter the local power structures. Following World War II, the United Nations was formed and Ruanda-Urundi became a trust territory under Belgian administration, which required the Belgians to politically educate the locals and prepare them for independence.

The inhabitants of Urundi were allowed to participate in politics beginning in 1959. Limited self-government was established in 1961. The Union pour le Progrès national (UPRONA) won in a landslide in national elections and its leader, Louis Rwagasore, became prime minister. Though a son of Burundian King Mwambutsa IV, he ran on a platform of equal opportunity, generating hope of peaceful race relations. He was assassinated a month after taking office. Ethnic polarization, initially of little concern to the ruling class, rapidly rose among Urundi's political elite after the murder. Urundi was granted independence as the Kingdom of Burundi in July 1962, while Rwanda became an independent republic.

Mwambutsa angered Burundi's politicians by repeatedly intervening in their affairs to try and reform the country's fractious governments. The violence against Tutsis in the Rwandan Revolution of 1962–1963 heightened domestic ethnic anxieties. From this point on, every Tutsi-dominated regime in Burundi was keen to prevent a similar revolution in their own country. By 1965, assassinations, subversive plots, and an attempted coup had generated the murder of numerous Hutu members of Parliament and sparked ethnic violence in rural areas. The following year Mwambutsa was ousted in a coup in favor of his son Ntare V. Ntare was soon thereafter deposed in another coup led by a young Tutsi officer in the Burundian military, Michel Micombero. Micombero abolished the monarchy and was installed as President of Burundi; under his rule power was increasingly concentrated in the hands of Tutsis, particularly a coterie from Bururi Province dubbed the Groupe de Bururi, while Hutu participation in government was steadily reduced. Rumours of a Hutu coup plot in 1969 led the government to execute dozens of Hutu public figures. By the early 1970s, Burundi had a population of roughly five million, of which approximately 85 percent were Hutu, 14 percent were Tutsi, and one percent were Twa.

During the same period tensions rose between the Tutsi subgroups—the Tutsi-Banyaruguru and the Tutsi-Hima. The Tutsi-Banyaruguru were historically connected to the monarchy, whereas Micombero and many of his Bururi associates were Tutsi-Hima. His government accused several prominent Banyaruguru in July 1971 of plotting to restore Ntare to the throne. On January 14, 1972, a military tribunal sentenced nine Banyaruguru to death and another seven to life in prison for conspiracy. The Tutsi division greatly weakened the legitimacy of Micombero's Hima-dominated government.

=== Return of Ntare V ===
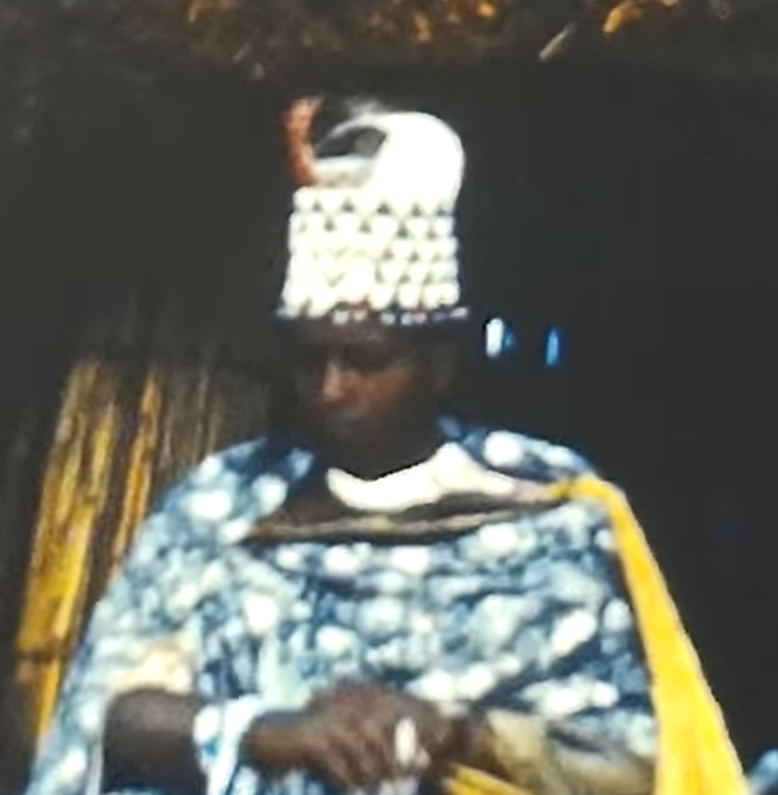
Ntare V of Burundi in 1966, pictured at his coronation

On 30 March 1972 Ntare flew into Gitega, Burundi via helicopter from Uganda after years in exile. He was immediately detained and kept under house arrest in his former palace in the city. The reasons for Ntare's return to Burundi remain disputed. Some commentators alleged that he had negotiated an arrangement with Micombero whereby he could return to his home country to live as a normal citizen but was ultimately betrayed by the president. Others suggested that Ugandan President Idi Amin had delivered Ntare into Micombero's custody as a "gift". Writer Marc Manirakiza stated that Amin's government had coordinated with Micombero to hijack Ntare's aircraft while it was en route to the Ugandan locale of Kabare. The Ugandan government denied any conspiracy, stating that Micombero had guaranteed it that Ntare would be safe in Burundi. Some European diplomats believed Micombero had legitimately agreed to let Ntare return unmolested "in a moment of mental aberration" only to quickly regret his decision and "over-react" by arresting him. Burundian Minister of Foreign Affairs Artémon Simbananiye oversaw the discussions with the Ugandan authorities that led to Ntare's repatriation.

Soon after Ntare's arrest, Burundian official media declared that he had been detained for plotting a coup to restore his throne with the use of white mercenaries. The state radio broadcaster, Voix de la Révolution, declared, "Let us re-double our vigilance, the enemies of our liberation have not yet been disarmed." While the original broadcast attributed the failure of Ntare's supposed plot to his lack of "agents" within Burundi, a correction issued the following day alleged that such agents were inside the country.

Meanwhile, the Burundian government debated Ntare's fate. Some ministers favored that he would be kept in custody in Gitega, while others wanted him executed. Particularly, the Groupe de Bururi members thought his death was a necessity, while those who disagreed feared severe ramifications from killing the former king. On 23 April a school administrator in Bururi was informed that most Hutu teachers in Nyanza-Lac had fled to Tanzania. He relayed the message to the Burundian government which, fearing trouble, scheduled a meeting of provincial officials in the city of Rumonge for 29 April. At noon on 29 April Micombero dissolved his government and dismissed several other top officials, including Executive Secretary of UPRONA André Yande. Some Burundians were excited by this news, thinking it signaled Micombero's decision to do away with the Groupe. The administration was left to operate at the direction of the directors general of the government ministries.

== Events ==
=== Hutu uprising ===
Between 20:00 and 21:00 on 29 April, Hutu militants began a series of attacks in Bujumbura and across the southern provinces of Rumonge, Nyanza-Lac and Bururi. In each location, the rebels coalesced around a group of individuals that wore a "uniform" of black shirts, tattoos, red headbands or white enamel pots splashed with red paint. They operated in bands of about 10–30 individuals and were armed with automatic weapons, machetes, and spears. The militants were joined by Zairean exiles, commonly dubbed "Mulelists". Burundi was home to thousands of Zairean exiles who were culturally distinct from other members of Burundian society but had grievances against the Groupe de Bururi and were receptive to the incitement against Micombero's regime. The Mulelist label recalled the name of Pierre Mulele, who had led a rebellion in central Zaire from 1964 to 1965. In reality, the Zairean rebels who fought alongside the Hutu militants were mostly the former followers of Gaston Soumialot, who had led a similar rebellion in eastern Zaire during the same time period. (Note: Historian Aidan Russell wrote, "This portrayal [of the rebels as Mulelists] served a special purpose in currying foreign favor, or at least indulgence; given Mobutu's early struggles against the Mulelists and the United States' fears of their Communist aspirations, this was a productive line of rhetoric. Mobutu's swift support to Micombero, and perhaps the general U.S. silence on the subsequent state violence, suggested it was substantially effective.") The rebels targeted Tutsis and committed numerous atrocities, as well as burning homes and slaughtering cattle. Despite these ethnic killings, researcher Nigel Watt argued that the insurgents initially hoped to gain the support of Tutsi monarchists who were upset over Ntare's arrest.

In Bururi, the rebels murdered all military and civilian authorities. Upon capturing armories in Rumonge and Nyanza-Lac, the militants killed every Tutsi person they encountered and a number of Hutus who refused to join them. The meeting of provincial officials in Rumonge was still ongoing when the attacks began. The rebels killed 12 officials, but Yande and Albert Shibura, who had been leading the conference, managed to shoot their way out of the meeting hall and escape to Bujumbura. Hutu and Tutsi peasants in the town of Vyanda jointly attempted to resist the militants. Missionaries estimated that the rebels murdered 800–1,200 Tutsis and Hutus between 29 April and 5 May, with most victims being Tutsis. Academic René Lemarchand cited 1,000–2,000 Tutsi deaths as a "plausible estimate". After taking control in the south, the rebels regrouped in Vyanda and declared the creation of the "République de Martyazo". Within their territory the rebels hoisted a red and green flag and subjected captured Tutsis to "people's tribunals".

Late in the evening on 29 April, the Voix de la Révolution broadcast a declaration of a state of emergency. In Bujumbura, the rebels targeted the radio station but lost the element of surprise and quickly resorted to uncoordinated attacks against Tutsis. Army officers swiftly mobilized their troops and neutralised the rebels in the city within 24 hours. That night Ntare was executed at Gitega by government troops. Historians Jean-Pierre Chrétien and Jean-François Dupaquier, after evaluating several witness testimonies, concluded that Ntare was shot and stabbed to death by a group of about a dozen soldiers led by Captain Ntabiraho on the orders of Micombero at about 23:15. On 30 April, Micombero quickly restored the public prosecutors Cyrille Nzohabonayo and Bernard Kayibigi to their offices to aid in suppressing the insurgency. State media also announced the installation of military governors to replace civilians in every province, revealed Ntare's death, and claimed that monarchists had assaulted his palace in Gitega in an attempt to free him and that he "was killed during the attack".

The same day, Micombero appealed to the government of Zaire for assistance in suppressing the rebellion. President Mobutu Sese Seko responded by dispatching a company of Zairian paratroopers to Bujumbura, where they occupied the airport and guarded strategic locations around the city. He also loaned Micombero a few jets to conduct aerial reconnaissance. This guaranteed Micombero's control of the capital and freed up Burundian troops to fight the insurgency in the south. The Zairian forces were withdrawn a week later. Tanzanian President Julius Nyerere shipped 24 tons of ammunition to the Burundian army to assist in its campaign. (Note: According to Warren Weinstein, "It is reported" that the Chinese government had pressured the Tanzanian government to send the "Chinese-provided" ammunition to Burundi.) Once the extent of the reprisal killings became known, Mobutu and Nyerere refused Micombero further materiel assistance. The French government supplied the Burundian regime with arms, and several French pilots flew on its behalf in counterattacks against the rebels. (Note: France signed a technical assistance agreement with Burundi concerning its army air force in 1969.) Uganda and Libya also supplied the Burundian government with technical assistance to suppress the rebellion.

The Burundian government launched its first counter-attacks using soldiers from Bujumbura and military camps in Bururi. On 1 May government troops from Bujumbura secured Rumonge, and the following day troops from Gitega occupied Nyanza-Lac. According to witnesses, all of the rebels captured by the Burundian Army were summarily executed and buried in mass graves. All persons seeking shelter in the bush or bearing scarification were deemed "rebels" by the government and hunted down. This provoked an exodus of thousands of refugees towards Zaire and Tanzania, particularly those who had resided on the coast of Lake Tanganyika. One Burundian helicopter dropped leaflets stating that order would soon be restored, while another strafed columns of fleeing civilians. Between 30 April and 5 May the army focused on recapturing the Lake Tanganyika coastline. On 10 May the government announced that it had complete military control over southern Burundi, though some conflict persisted.

=== Killings ===
After re-securing Bururi and suppressing the rebellion, the Burundian government embarked on a programme of repression, first targeting the country's remaining Hutu elites. All remaining former Hutu ministers in Micombero's previous governments were detained in the first week of the crisis. This included the four Hutus who had been in the cabinet as of the morning of 29 April before its dissolution: Minister of Civil Service Joseph Baragengana, Minister of Communications Pascal Bubiriza, Minister of Public Works Marc Ndayiziga, and Minister of Social Affairs Jean Chrysostome Bandyambona. Ndayiziga had stunned missionaries when he complied with Micombero's summons for him to return from abroad, even though members of his family had been arrested. All four were quickly killed. Hutu officers in the armed forces were hastily purged; the United Nations High Commissioner for Refugees estimated that 131 Hutu officers were killed by late May, with only four left remaining. Commandant Martin Ndayahoze, a Hutu officer and former government minister who had been loyal to Micombero, disappeared after being summoned to a crisis meeting early in the morning on 30 April. It was later revealed that he had been arrested and executed, and Burundian officials maintained that he had been plotting against the government. According to the American ambassador, Thomas Melady, an additional approximate 500 Hutu soldiers were detained as well as was about 2,000 civil servants in the capital. The government admitted to the killing of these prisoners by declaring that the "culprits" of the uprising were being arrested, put on trial, and executed. There were never any public trials of those accused of plotting rebellion. Victims collected from Bujumbura were buried in a mass grave in Buterere.

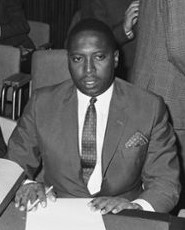
Artémon Simbananiye directed the killings of Hutus

As Micombero had dissolved his government, the early stages of repression were marred by substantial confusion. In practice, individuals with close connections to the president, particularly the Groupe de Bururi, were still able to wield authority. On 12 May, Micombero appointed former Minister of Foreign Affairs Simbananiye to an itinerant ambassadorship, thus empowering him to organise and direct the killings of Hutus. (Note: Simbananiye later denied any involvement in the killings.) Albert Shibura and other key Groupe members were quickly viewed by foreign aid workers as conduits through whom official business with the authorities could be conducted. Thus, power in the centre of government was quickly reconsolidated, though without the restoration of many formal positions of authority. This initial confusion was limited to the highest levels of government; the lower-levels of administration carried out the repression with minimal disruption. In May the Burundian authorities banned foreign journalists from entering the country. The government also forbade movement of persons between provinces without a pass.

At the Official University of Bujumbura, Tutsi students attacked and killed some of their Hutu classmates. A total of 56 Hutu students were arrested at the institution by the authorities and taken away, as were many Hutu administrators. Gabriel Barakana, the rector of the university, condemned the killing of innocent people, particularly students, in a public address on 9 May. He also privately urged Micombero, his friend, to stop the repression. By 8 May most of the educated Hutus in Bujumbura had been eliminated, and the regime extended its repression to the provinces, with Micombero appealing to his supporters to seek "new victories". Repression then became frequent in the north of the country. A handful of foreign Christian priests in northern Burundi condemned the repression, resulting in police interrogating them for engaging in "political activity" and placing them under surveillance. A total of 17 Hutu Roman Catholic priests were killed, while two bishops were placed under house arrest. Several Catholic mission superiors penned a letter to the Burundi Episcopate which attacked church officials for failing to condemn the atrocities committed against Hutus. Archbishop André Makarakiza, a Tutsi, defended the church's position, while the Sûreté Nationale expelled several of the letter's signatories from the country.

The significant involvement of the Burundian judiciary in the repression allowed it to assume a quasi-judicial nature. The first arrests in the provinces were authorised by prosecutors against individuals long-suspected of dissidence or of playing leading roles in the uprising. Indictments and arrests gradually expanded outward through the initial detainees' personal relationships to encompass entire segments of the population. Regular meetings by communal and provincial officials about general issues of governance began to include discussions of suspects in the rebellion. As the arrests progressed, magistrate Déogratias Ntavyo wrote that "difficulties of a practical nature" prevented him from providing extensive detail in his indictments. By mid-May Ntavyo resorted to grouping 101 detainees into categories based upon their profession and geographic proximity. The categories Ntavyo delineated were as follows: civil servants, who used their positions in government to deliberately undermine state institutions; church officials, who preached social division and fanaticism; and wealthy merchants, who used their money to persuade others to support their ulterior motives. (Note: During the Ikiza the government seized the accounts of most prosperous Hutus at the Caisse d'Epargne du Burundi, the national savings bank.) According to historian Aidan Russell, Ntavyo's outlook "was mirrored across the country; an urge to 'couper tout ce qui dépasse', 'cut down all those who excel'."

Authorities usually arrested people according to their name appearing on a written list. Even when authorities selected victims at personal whim for opportunistic reasons, such as living in a quality home suitable for plunder, they would justify their selection by referring to the victim's name appearing on a list. Though some detainees were roughed up when arrested, most arrests occurred peacefully and the captives were later executed by soldiers or gendarmes out of public view. There is a consensus among the accounts of the killings that the majority of Hutus targeted by the state behaved submissively and cooperated with authorities. Authorities swept through rural areas during the night, moving house to house, while in urban areas they established roadblocks and took Hutus from their vehicles. The killings were mostly undertaken by the army, the Jeunesses Révolutionnaires Rwagasore (the youth wing of UPRONA), and an unknown number of Rwandan Tutsi refugees who had fled from the Rwandan Revolution. Few persons were shot; most victims were either stabbed or beaten to death. Many Hutu women and girls were sexually abused by the authorities.

Hutu intellectual Michel Kayoya was arrested by the regime for "racism" in the early stages of the Ikiza before being removed from prison and shot on 15 May. Joseph Cimpaye, Burundi's first prime minister, was also executed, as was former parliamentarian and governor Eustache Ngabisha, university administrator and former government minister Claver Nuwinkware, and star footballer Meltus Habwawihe. Governor of Bujumbura Gregoire Barakamfitiye, a Hutu, was arrested thrice but ultimately spared.

There were few instances of regime-sponsored killings of Tutsi during the affair. International observers in Bujumbura noted a "purification" among the local Tutsis as the authorities arrested and executed the moderates who did not appear to fully support the course of action being taken against the Hutus. Groupe de Bururi members sought the arrest of "liberal" Tutsis in early May. An estimated 100 Tutsi were executed in Gitega on 6 May in an incident that probably extended from the Hima-Banyaruguru rivalry. In Ngozi Province, Military Governor Joseph Bizoza had six Tutsi officials killed including former government minister Amédée Kabugubugu. (Note: Bizoza had a long-standing grudge against Kabugubugu. He later stated that he had mistaken Kabugubugu and another Tutsi official as Hutus.) The civilian governor, Antoine Gahiro, feared for his life and fled, leaving Bizoza in sole command of the area. Several Rwandan and Zairian citizens were also killed, and some Hutus in Bujumbura pretended to be Zairean citizens to avoid scrutiny. The Belgian ambassador reported that one Belgian citizen was killed during the first few days of repression, though attributed this to an accident. No other Western nationals were harmed.

The most intense violence subsided in June. At the beginning of the month Micombero dispatched "councils of wise men" to tour the country to encourage calm and inform the public that the crisis was over. In some instances they convened meetings to draw Hutus out of hiding so they could be taken by the army and executed. On 21 June Army Commander-in-Chief Thomas Ndabyemeye announced that all military operations were over. On 13 July the Burundian army seized UNICEF vehicles and a UN survey boat, and executed Hutus working on UN projects. The Sûreté Nationale also sent agents into eastern Zaire to extradite wanted Hutus. Micombero formed a new government the following day led by Albin Nyamoya. To deflect criticism of the violence, Micombero placed more moderates in his cabinet, including a few token Hutus. Simbananiye was restored to the office of Minister of Foreign Affairs. He soon thereafter reshuffled the army command, dismissing its deputy commander who had played a key role in the civilian massacres and a purge of moderate Tutsi soldiers. The new prime minister embarked on a tour of the country, speaking with Tutsi-dominated crowds. Though assuring them that peace had been restored, he encouraged them to be wary of persisting "traitors". The killings mostly ended by early August. On 23 August the civilian governors were restored to the provinces.

=== Official Burundian narrative ===
Micombero stated that 100,000 people died in the rebellion and its aftermath, suggesting that the deaths were shared equally among Hutus and Tutsis. He officially denied that the dissolution of his government was linked to the rebellion, saying the succession of events was a matter of "providence". Early on in the Ikiza the government attempted to link the Hutu rebels with Rwandan monarchists, but this was quickly abandoned as the rebels professed an ideology of Hutu supremacy while the majority of Rwandan monarchists were popularly perceived as Tutsi. In late June Nzohabonayo declared in an interview that the uprising in the south had been part of an "imperialist" plot hatched by Hutu insurgents, followers of the late Zairean rebel Pierre Mulele, and former Hutu government ministers with intent to take over Burundi and use it as a base to attack Tanzania and Zaire.

International observers were inclined to agree with the government that there had been some sort of "Hutu plot" but remained suspicious of the apparent efficiency and precision of its anti-Hutu repression. Some Christian church officials suspected that the government had known about the plot and had allowed the uprising to proceed to use it as an excuse to start the killings. On 26 June the Burundian Embassy in the United States published a white paper which deflected accusations of genocide. It read in part, "We do not believe that repression is tantamount to genocide, there is an abyss between the two. We do not speak of repression, but of a LEGITIMATE DEFENSE BECAUSE OUR COUNTRY WAS AT WAR". (Note: Russell wrote that the killings took place in "an absence of genuine civil war".) In turn, the Burundian paper accused the rebels of meticulously planning a genocide that would eliminate all Burundian Tutsis. The government published a white book in September titled Autopsy of the Tragedy of Burundi. Distributed to diplomatic postings, the work claimed that ethnic violence was instigated by foreigners and that Belgium was largely responsible for the events of 1972. It made no attributions of responsibility for the violence to Burundian leaders. Foreign sources disagreed significantly with the Burundian account, rejecting its description of the uprising as exaggerated and its version of the repression as minimised. Burundi's Catholic bishops mostly defended the government's position, speaking of "a diabolical plot to deceive the people in order to foster racial hatred". Two bishops specifically stated that the killings were the result of an "attack from a foreign power". The government and the church both euphemistically referred to the rebellion and the subsequent killings as the "troubles".

== Foreign response ==
=== Humanitarian relief ===
Burundi was declared to be a "disaster area" by the United States government on May 1. After using $25,000 from the aid contingency fund of the World Disaster Relief Account, Burundi asked the United States for another $75,000, which was immediately granted. Most of the money was used to purchase goods locally or from nearby countries; items included blankets, two ambulances, food, clothes and transportation. In total, the United States government spent $627,400 on relief efforts during and after the Ikiza in Burundi and in the neighboring countries to which refugees had fled. Total American private charitable expenditures on aid amounted to $196,500.

In late May UN Secretary General Kurt Waldheim offered to establish a humanitarian aid programme. Two small UN missions were dispatched to Burundi to survey the needs of the populace. The first consisted of Issoufou Saidou-Djermakoye, Macaire Pedanou, and A. J. Homannherimberg. They arrived in Bujumbura on 22 June and were received by Micombero. They stayed in the country for a week, touring several outlying areas and writing a report which was submitted to Waldheim. On 4 July Waldheim held a press conference. Referring to the report, he said that an estimated 80,000–200,000 people had been killed while another 500,000 had been internally displaced. A second, "technical team" consisting of P. C. Stanissis and Eugène Koffi Adoboli was dispatched to Burundi to draft a relief plan. They stayed from 31 July to 7 August, submitting their recommendations two days thereafter. Central to their argument was the urging of the creation of a short-term and a long-term relief program to rehabilitate the heavily damaged regions and promote economic growth. This included suggested UN technical assistance to replace those Burundian personnel from important institutions who had "disappeared". The UN ultimately spent over $4 million in assisting internally displaced persons and refugees.

Several international Christian charitable groups supplied food and medical supplies to Burundians during the early stages of the Ikiza. Following an appeal to the Burundian government, the International Committee of the Red Cross (ICRC) was authorised on 28 June to provide relief in southwestern Burundi and Bujumbura. The Burundian government also agreed to a Red Cross request that its staff be allowed to directly oversee the distribution of its aid to its intended recipients, but on 6 July the Minister of Health and the president of the Burundi Red Cross withdrew the authorisation and made all ICRC-planned efforts subject to approval by Burundi's National Relief Commission before implementation. The ICRC delegates in the country—who also felt that the Burundi Red Cross was little more than a government instrument—feared that the change would prevent proper distribution of relief to Hutu victims. Frustrated, the delegates wrote to their headquarters in Geneva, urging them to publicise the affair to embarrass the Burundian government. The Mennonite Central Committee also accused the Burundian authorities of an "apparent unwillingness to allow relief agencies to help the Hutu". ICRC talks with Burundian officials on renegotiating the terms of aid distribution broke down on 14 July. A delegate made a new attempt to reach an agreement three days later after the new government was installed. They proposing a tripartite scheme of control over aid distribution including representatives from the ICRC, the Burundi Red Cross, and a national comite de secours (relief committee) which would allow for ICRC staff to manage its own stock of supplies and personally disburse it. Burundian officials rejected it, maintaining that relief supplies should instead be kept at the UPRONA party headquarters and distributed by local Burundian agencies. Hearing of the lack of progress of the negotiations, the ICRC headquarters withdrew its representatives from the country; one moved to Rwanda to evaluate the possibilities of aiding refugees there. Leaks about the problems with the ICRC led the Burundian mission at the UN to issue a denial of any difficulties on 4 August, saying, "the Burundi Government was able to fully meet the required relief aid, fortunately having ample relief sources of its own from the start, thanks to the bi-lateral assistance from friendly countries and consequently we succeeded in handling the emergency...if the International Red Cross team left it is not because the Government has anything to hide but because it was not needed."

In mid-August the Burundian government softened its stance and allowed the ICRC to provide aid on the condition that League of Red Cross Societies personnel replaced ICRC staff in Burundi, that their efforts would be confined to Bujumbura and Bururi, and that distribution would be done in conjunction with the Burundi Red Cross. As the ICRC was primarily responsible for relief efforts in wartime while the League held the purview for peacetime relief, this proposal by the Burundian government was meant to signal that the conflict and killings had ceased. In attempt to exert its control over the country, the Burundian government continuously harassed relief organisations during this time; on 21 August the offloading of relief supplies from a Caritas Internationalis plane was delayed while the director-general of the Ministry of Health debated with the director of the charity over who would control the distribution of aid. The government ultimately seized all Red Cross shipments inbound from Switzerland and ten tons of milk brought in by Caritas. Catholic Relief Services was permitted to keep its supplies after the government forced it to open all of its packages for inspection. Ultimately, the ICRC was able to distribute aid in the government-designated disaster area in southwest Burundi while Caritas and Catholic Relief Services discreetly assisted widows and orphans in areas around the country not officially sanctioned for relief by the government. Once their ability to provide aid was secure, the charitable organisations avoided politicising the situation in Burundi or commenting on the killings that had triggered the disaster.

=== Reactions to violence ===
United States officials at their embassy in Bujumbura were quick to notice the repression, as trucks full of bodies passed their building and their Hutu employees spoke about relatives being murdered. On 5 May Ambassador Melady met with Micombero to express his concern about the violence and offer humanitarian aid. Melady cautioned Micombero to exercise restraint in quelling the rebellion, thus making him the first Western representative to officially react to the killings and appeal for the cessation of them. Micombero assured the ambassador that American expatriates would be guaranteed their safety by the government. A Burundian employee of the United States embassy who had been arrested was released after Melady's intervention. On 10 May Melady sent a wire to the United States Department of State indicating that the violence was taking on the characteristics of a "selective genocide". The United States government responded to the atrocities by encouraging the Organisation of African Unity to discuss the matter and urging the United Nations to send humanitarian aid to Burundi. Officials at the United States embassy in Nairobi, Kenya initially shared details of the situation in Burundi with American reporters, but this stopped after Melady criticised them for divulging the information.

By mid-May most Western diplomats in Burundi felt that the rebellion had been quelled and that the persisting violence took on the appearance of an attempt to eliminate Hutus. As Belgium was the previous mandatory ruler of Burundi, the Belgian government was, among foreign entities, the most directly concerned by the events there. Prime Minister Gaston Eyskens informed his cabinet on 19 May that he was in the possession of information that Burundi was experiencing "veritable genocide". The Belgian Foreign Minister assured the Senate Foreign Relations Committee that the Belgian Ambassador in Burundi had been instructed to express concern about the situation and a desire for peace. Ambassador Pierre van Haute fulfilled this task several days later. Belgian journalists, the public, and members of Parliament condemned the violence. Due to a large amount of pressure from the public and some urging from the United States, Belgium halted ammunition sales to Burundi. It also initiated a gradual withdrawal of its military assistance team and, after a rejection of a revision of terms for its education assistance program, withdrew its loaned teachers. The Belgian government later decided to terminate all military aid to Burundi by September 1973, deeply angering Burundian officials. The Belgians also threatened to suspend its annual $4.5 million aid contribution to Burundi but this was never carried out, as policy makers took the position that withdrawing assistance would be more harmful to the Burundian people than the government.

"Halt the killing: that does Africa no good or, particularly, Burundian development. We realize that that is very difficult, once the murderers have taken to the road."

— Excerpt of Rwandan President Grégoire Kayibanda's letter to Micombero, 1 June 1972

During this time the American, Belgian, French, West German, Rwandan, and Zairean diplomats held several meetings at the Apostolic nunciature in Bujumbura where they expressed their feelings that the Burundian government's repression was no longer related to suppressing the uprising but had extended into a campaign of ethnic revenge. They all urged that the dean of the diplomatic corps, Papal Nuncio William Aquin Carew, should address a letter on their behalf to Micombero. Carew had been out of the country and returned on 25 May. Four days later he sent a cautious message of protest to the Burundian authorities on behalf of himself and the other diplomats. Pope John Paul II also publicly denounced the "bloody fighting" in the country. Fearing that harsh condemnation from their governments would arouse Burundian anger at perceived Western imperialism, the Western diplomats encouraged their superiors to appeal to African leaders to intercede. Mobutu and Nyerere were approached to no avail. On 1 June, after American diplomats spoke with Rwandan President Grégoire Kayibanda (who was Hutu), the Rwandan Minister of International Cooperation delivered a letter signed by Kayibanda to the Burundian authorities which pleaded with Micombero stop the killings. The following day deputies in the National Assembly of France vainly urged the French government to take action to stop the killings. According to Melady, the foreign representatives of North Korea, the Soviet Union, and the People's Republic of China showed no interest in protesting the killings.

Waldheim informed the Burundian Permanent Representative that the UN was concerned about the situation in the country. OAU Secretary General Diallo Telli visited Burundi on 22 May for a "fact-finding" mission, and declared that his presence indicated the OAU's solidarity with Micombero, pledging his "full support" to the president. Many Western diplomats were shocked by this statement. The United States Department of State later reported that Telli had confided in a diplomat that he had urged Micombero to stop the killings, as they reflected poorly on Africa. The following month the OAU held a conference in Rabat. The Burundian delegation declared that the crisis in Burundi was primarily due to outsiders acting on the behalf of neocolonialists and that the country had no problems in its ethnic relations. The OAU Ministerial Council passed a resolution stating that it was assured that Micombero's actions would quickly restore peace and Burundian national unity. A handful of African delegates privately expressed their dissatisfaction with this gesture. Aside from Kayibanda of Rwanda, most African heads of state made no public condemnation of the killings in Burundi, though the National Union of Students of Uganda did so on July 16. On 21 August the United Nations Development Programme's representative in Burundi left the country to protest the murder of Hutus. The Rwandan government formally accused Burundi of committing genocide against Hutus at an OAU meeting in May 1973.

Aside from the diplomatic protests and the procuring of humanitarian aid, no steps were taken by the international community to stop the killings. United States Department of State officials concluded that "there could be no interference in the internal affairs of Burundi" for fear of aggravating anti-imperialist sentiment in Africa. The United States National Security Council closely monitored Burundian affairs in case events there were to "break more sharply into the public view than has thus far been the case." This did not occur, as most news stories about Burundi faded by July. In September President Richard Nixon became intrigued by the events in Burundi and began requesting information on the State Department's response to the killings. State officials maintained that they had taken the best course of action and that they held little leverage in Burundi, neglecting to mention that the United States was the chief importer of Burundian coffee. United States National Security Adviser Henry Kissinger wrote a memo on the killings to Nixon, arguing that since the United States had few strategic interests in the country that it should limit its involvement in the affair. Nixon reacted angrily to the cautious advice of the document, writing in its margins that "This is one of the most cynical, callous reactions of a great government to a terrible human tragedy I have ever seen." He added, "Tell the weak sister[s] in the African Bureau of State to give a recommendation as to how we can at least show moral outrage. And let's begin by calling back our Ambassador immediately for consultation. Under no circumstances will I appoint a new Ambassador to present credentials to these butchers." Robert L. Yost, Melady's replacement (Melady had been reassigned), was recalled from Burundi in 1973. This coincided with the termination of all bilateral cultural exchange and economic aid programs. Humanitarian aid was left to continue under the condition that it was fairly distributed to all Burundians. The State Department arranged for diplomat David D. Newsom to meet Burundian Ambassador Terence Tsanze on 18 October to explain that the actions were meant to protest the anti-Hutu violence. Tsanze responded defensively, arguing that the Hutu uprising had posed the greatest threat to Micombero's government to date, denying that ethnicity was a major factor in the reprisals, and maintaining that all foreign aid was equitably distributed. The United States normalised its relations with Burundi in January 1974.

== Analyses ==
=== Death toll ===
Conservative estimates place the death toll of the genocide between 100,000 and 150,000 killed, while some place it as high as 300,000, roughly coming out to include 10–15 percent of Burundi's male Hutu population. Lemarchand estimated 200,000–300,000 Hutu deaths. Since the repression targeted educated Hutus and most educated persons in Burundi were male, more males than females died in the event. Approximately 75 percent of educated Burundian Hutus were killed. Lemarchand asserted that the killings were conducted by the government due to a perceived threat to the state in the form of the April rebellion, writing, "Retribution rather than ideology must be seen as the primary motivation behind the killings."

=== Assessment of the violence as a genocide ===
There is a no academic consensus as to whether the Ikiza constituted a genocide, a "selective genocide", a "double genocide", or simply extensive ethnic cleansing. Many prefer to describe what happened as a "massacre". International law practitioner William J. Butler and international studies scholar George Obiozor concluded that "genocidal acts occurred in Burundi and the victims were mainly Hutus". Historian Jean-Pierre Chretien characterised the Ikiza as "a veritable genocide of Hutu elites". Sociologist Leo Kuper considered it a genocide, as did historian Alison Des Forges. Lemarchand described the event as a "selective genocide" and "partial genocide", stressing the targeting of educated persons among the wider Hutu population. Sociologist Irving Louis Horowitz criticised Lemarchand's use of the former phrase, saying "the use of such terms as selective genocide, like cultural genocide, is an essentially emotive effort to lay claim to the special character of mass murder, perhaps to heighten the sense of horrors these often neglected people have experienced." Scholars who have focused on the 1994 Rwandan genocide have tended to minimise the 1972 events in Burundi. Academics Scott Straus and David Leonard refer to them as "organised massacres" instead of genocide. Policy analyst David Rieff wrote that the targeting of Hutus based on education status meant that the killings qualified under international law as genocide. Historian Timothy J. Stapleton also believed that the Ikiza satisfied international standards for qualification as genocide. In 1985 the UN retroactively labeled the 1972 killings as genocide.

While most academic discussions about the use of the term genocide in relation to the 1972 events in Burundi involve the mass killing of Hutus by Tutsis, Chretien and historian Jean-François Dupaquier considered the anti-Tutsi activities of the Hutu rebels as evidence of a projet génocidaire which never came to fruition. As part of their case for this conclusion, Chretien and Dupaquier cited the alleged existence of pamphlets distributed by the rebels with explicit calls to commit genocide against Tutsis. No original copies of these documents are known to exist, though the two historians cited a book by Marc Manirakiza, an opponent of Micombero's regime who claimed to have reproduced these tracts in their near entirety in his work. Lemarchand rejected the historical authenticity of the documents and criticised Chretien's and Dupaquier's hypothesis as "uncritically endorsing the official version of the Burundi authorities at the time" and not supported by empirical data.

=== Behavior of victims ===
Foreign accounts of the Ikiza generally expressed surprise at the apparent willingness of the victims to comply with the perpetrators' orders until their deaths. Numerous explanations for this behavior have been offered. Some authors attribute the obedience of the Hutus to resignation in the face of overwhelming obstacles, while others suggested that their actions were rooted in Burundi's feudal history and a culture of Hutu subservience to Tutsis. Kuper cited the Ikiza as an example of a genocide "in which the victims [had] some (significant) capacity to resist, or in which, objectively considered, the victims constitute[d] a serious threat". Historian Aidan Russell criticised this conclusion, writing "to maintain such a reading it is necessary to elide the distinction between the individual faced with such state violence and the potential of an imagined community that, as yet, many had not themselves imagined [...] Beyond a select group of politicians and militants, the Hutu ethnicity had not constituted a corporate community for the majority of its members in the hills. Each victim met the violence of state alone."

== Aftermath ==
=== Effects on Burundi ===
"The impact of the Burundi bloodbath on subsequent developments in Burundi and Rwanda cannot be overemphasized."

— Political scientist René Lemarchand, 2009

Russell wrote, "Burundi's long 1960s stretched from the abrupt beginning of political competition in 1959, through formal independence in 1962, to a cataclysm of destruction in 1972. It was with this violence that the future horizons of possibility closed, and people felt they recognised a new certainty in what postcolonial relationships, identities, and life itself now meant." The Ikiza secured the domination of Burundian society by Tutsis, particularly the Hima. The Banyaruguru elites who had sparred with Micombero's regime moved to support the Hima leaders, seeing the Hutu uprising as presenting a greater threat to themselves. Some of the underlying tension persisted, leading the president to dismiss his Banyarugu prime minister in 1973 and assume personal control over key ministerial portfolios. Thousands of Hutus and Tutsis were rendered internally displaced by the violence of 1972. In the event's aftermath, the surviving educated Hutus were almost entirely excluded from leading positions in the army, the civil service, state enterprises, and higher-level educational institutions. What Hutus were left in the civil service were kept there largely for appearances. The virtual elimination of a generation of educated Hutus also ensured Tutsi dominance of the judiciary for decades. The purges shrunk the size of the armed forces. The killings also caused limited harm to the economy, as the loss of Hutu workers in the coffee industry disrupted its transport and storage. Many Hutu farmers fled the violence and their crops were burned, but since most of these ran subsistence agriculture operations, their destruction had little national impact. Production of cotton—the county's second largest cash crop—plummeted. From 1973 to 1980, many Hutu students from Burundi pursued their secondary educations in neighboring countries. Within Burundi, the month of May—the anniversary of the Ikiza—generated anxiety among Hutu students, and this was reportedly exploited by Tutsi authorities to prevent them from passing their annual exams.

In 1974 Micombero declared a general amnesty for Hutu refugees. His regime remained hostile to the exiles, however; in 1975 the government killed a group of repatriated refugees in Nyanza Lac one year after their return. Throughout the 1970s the Burundian government produced propaganda that portrayed the country as united and without ethnic problems. Nevertheless, its position remained precarious and fears of another Hutu uprising led to increased appropriations for the army. The repressiveness of the Ikiza successfully dampened the prospects of anti-regime actions, and Burundi was unprecedently free of conflict until 1988. Burundi received little military aid from Western powers following the killings with the exception of France. In turn, the country deepened its military ties with Eastern Bloc states.

In 1976 Micombero was overthrown in a bloodless coup by Colonel Jean-Baptiste Bagaza. Initially, Bagaza's regime offered potential ethnic reconciliation, declaring an amnesty for all Hutu refugees abroad and, in 1979, granting a limited amnesty to some of the incarcerated population. Nevertheless, Tutsi-Hima domination over the government was maintained. Political repression continued, and the government closely monitored the activities of its nationals abroad, even those who had renounced their Burundian citizenship. The systematic exclusion of Hutus from socio-economic opportunities was given little international attention for many years. Following international pressure, Burundi underwent a democratic transition in 1993 and elected its first Hutu president, Melchior Ndadaye. In an interview he said he would not pursue prosecution of individuals for acts committed in 1972, fearing that it would destabilise the country. On 21 October he and other political leaders were murdered by Tutsi army officers in a failed coup. The announcement of his death triggered a wave of violence, as Hutu peasants and political activists—many declaring that they feared a repeat of the Ikiza if they did not act—murdered thousands of Tutsis across the country.

=== Refugees ===
The Ikiza prompted a large, mostly-Hutu exodus from Burundi to neighboring countries. An unknown number who lived in the borderlands briefly sought shelter in neighbouring countries but returned after the most intense repression had passed. By mid-1973, however, about 6,000 had fled to Rwanda, but about half of these moved on to Tanzania, since Rwanda was densely populated and most of the land was already cultivated. By the same time approximately 35,000 had sought refuge in Zaire. The farmers mostly settled on the Ruzizi plain while the more-educated exiles applied for work with limited success in the towns of Uvira and Bukavu. Relief assistance from the Zairean government was sporadic, and it did not consider granting permits of residence to the refugees until 1976. Tanzania absorbed the vast majority of Burundi's refugees for several reasons: it was geographically proximate to Burundi's Bururi Province, where the government's repression was the most intense; it was already home to a sizable Burundian expatriate population; Tanzania's large Ha ethnic group's language was closely related to Kirundi; it was not densely populated; and it had historically welcomed refugees from other countries. An estimated 40,000 Burundians had sought refuge there by the end of 1973, and by the end of the 1974 the number had grown to 80,000. In August 1972 the Tanzanian government designated Ulyankulu, a remote area in the Tabora region, for refugee settlement with other communities established at Katumba and Mishoma in Kigoma region. Micombero's and Bagaza's amnesties convinced about 10,000 to 20,000 nationals to return to Burundi, mostly those residing in Zaire. The Ikiza triggered a new wave of thinking among the Hutu refugees, whereupon they came to believe that the Tutsis' ultimate goal was to kill enough Hutus to change the demography of Burundi so that both ethnic groups would be about equal in number, thus strengthening their political influence. Some surviving Hutu elites formulated a harsh anti-Tutsi ideology founded in the Hamitic hypothesis; according to them, Tutsi people—being of Hamitic origin—were inherently cruel and savage, relative to the Bantu-related Hutus. They cited the Ikiza as a prime example of this cruelty. More generally, Hutus became more aware of their own ethnic identity. Radical Hutus established the Parti pour la libération du peuple Hutu in the Tanzanian settlements, and in 1988 organised attacks against Tutsis in Burundi. Tanzanian political leaders sought to maintain good relations with Burundi, and openly discouraged attempts by the refugees to sponsor subversion in their home country. In the 2010s the Tanzanian government offered mass naturalisation to the remaining Burundian refugees and their children.

=== International effects ===
In 1973 the UN Sub-Commission for Prevention of Discrimination and Protection of Minorities forwarded a complaint against the Burundian government for consistent human rights violations to the UN Commission on Human Rights. When the commission held its annual conference in 1974, it appointed a new working group to communicate with the Burundians and deliver a new report on the country's human rights issues at the next conference, effectively dropping the matter. The commission ultimately dismissed the case in 1975. Meanwhile, the Carnegie Endowment for International Peace published a report on the genocide, advocating that the United States use its position as the chief purchaser of Burundian coffee to apply economic pressure to Micombero's regime. United States State Department official Herman Jay Cohen told a congressional committee that, "We felt that a threatened boycott would not have influenced the immediate problems of ethnic violence" and would have been detrimental to regular Burundian citizens. In 1987 the widow of Commandant Ndayahoze sought compensation for the murder of her husband and on behalf of other families with members who were victims of the Ikiza. At the request of the Burundian ambassador, she was barred from the UN headquarters building in New York.

The events in Burundi intensified ethnic tensions in Rwanda, where Hutus began harassing and attacking Tutsis, particularly students. Faced with increasing political isolation, Kayibanda used the Burundi killings as a reason to take further discriminatory measures against Tutsis. His government's use of vigilante committees to implement the programme generated instability when the bodies began questioning the power of the authorities, facilitating army officer Juvénal Habyarimana's coup in 1973. During the 1990–1994 Rwandan Civil War, many Hutu politicians recalled the Ikiza, using it to inform their fears of atrocities if the Tutsi-dominated Rwandan Patriotic Front succeeded in seizing power.

== Legacy ==
The genocide is remembered in Burundi as the "Ikiza", translated variously as the "Catastrophe", "Great Calamity", or "Scourge". It is also called the "Ubwicanyi", which translates from Kirundi as "Killings" or "Massacres". Ubwicanyi was commonly used to describe the event during and after the 1970s. The term "genocide" was not frequently used as a label until the 1990s, with local discourse being influenced by the 1994 Rwandan genocide and broad international human rights discussions. Genocide is still commonly used as a descriptor only in French discussions of the event and rarely mentioned in Kirundi-told narratives. It is sometimes called the "first genocide" to distinguish it from the 1993 killings in Burundi. According to Lemarchand, the Ikiza was the first documented genocide in post-colonial Africa. No person has ever been pressed with criminal charges related to the killings. Most information about the Ikiza came from refugees' and missionaries' accounts until historians Chrétien and Dupaquier published their book on the event, Burundi 1972, au bord des génocides, in 2007.

"Without a doubt for me April 29, 1972, the day of the start of the Bahutu genocide in Burundi [is the most terrible date in Burundian history]. This is all the more terrible as until today, a national consensus to recognize it is struggling to assert itself."

— Burundian politician Jean‐Marie Ngendahayo, 2018 (translated from French)

According to Lemarchand, the Ikiza "compete[s]" with the Rwandan genocide of Tutsis in the collective consciousness of Burundian Hutus and Tutsis for recognition. Burundian Hutus also attach more significance to the Ikiza relative to the 1993 massacres, which Tutsis emphasize. Lemarchand wrote in 2009 that "the 1972 genocide of Hutu by Tutsi has been virtually obliterated from the consciousness of most Tutsi." Some Burundians perceive both events as genocides worthy of remembrance, but generally factions have formed to claim the precedence of one event over the other and commemorate them accordingly. Burundian Hutus have retrospectively cited the existence of a "Simbananiye plan", a plot devised by the former foreign minister in 1967 before the Ikiza to eliminate the monarch and the Hutu elite, thus demonstrating the regime's alleged genocidal intent. This is likely a historical falsehood. Opinions in Burundian academia remain similarly divided on the events, with Hutu writers speaking of a premeditated plan put into action by the regime to exterminate Hutu elites, while Tutsi authors stress that the Ikiza started with the Hutu rebellion and accuse its perpetrators of having anti-Tutsi genocidal motives, thus justifying the response of the government.

For many years the Burundian government suppressed all public references to the killings of 1972 and did not investigate their origins. Annual commemorations of the Ikiza tend to occur abroad, especially in Belgium. The Burundian government erected a monument in 2010 to commemorate victims of all post-colonial violence in the country. In 2014 the Parliament of Burundi passed a law calling for the establishment of a Truth and Reconciliation Commission (CVR) to investigate atrocities and repression in the country between 1962 and 2008, including the Ikiza. The commission began its work in 2016. As part of its work, mass graves believed to contain victims of the Ikiza were exhumed across the country, documents from government archives were examined, and witnesses were interviewed. On 20 December 2021, the CVR delivered its 2021 progress report to Parliament and declared that the state committed genocide against Hutus in 1972.

== Works cited ==
- Adelman, Howard; Suhrke, Astri, eds. (1999). The Path of a Genocide: The Rwanda Crisis from Uganda to Zaire (illustrated ed.). Oxford: Transaction Publishers. ISBN 978-1-41-283820-7.
- Annan, Kofi A. (11 March 2005), Letter dated 11 March 2005 from the Secretary-General addressed to the President of the Security Council (PDF), New York: United Nations Security Council
- Bentrovato, Denise (2019). "Burundi". The Palgrave Handbook of Conflict and History Education in the Post-Cold War Era. Cham: Palgrave Macmillan. ISBN 9783030057213.
- "Burundi: The Long, Hot Summer" (PDF), Current Intelligence Weekly Summary, no. 653 (special ed.), United States Central Intelligence Agency, 22 September 1972, archived from the original (PDF) on 23 January 2017
- Callahan, David (1997). Unwinnable Wars: American Power and Ethnic Conflict (reprint ed.). New York: Macmillan. ISBN 9780809016105.
- Campbell, Jason J. (2012). On the Nature of Genocidal Intent. Lanham: Lexington Books. ISBN 9780739178478.
- Carney, J.J. (2014). Rwanda Before the Genocide: Catholic Politics and Ethnic Discourse in the Late Colonial Era. New York: Oxford University Press USA. ISBN 9780199982271.
- Charny, Israel W., ed. (1999). Encyclopedia of Genocide: A–H. Vol. 1. Santa Barbara: ABC-CLIO. ISBN 9780874369281.
- Chorbajian, Levon; Shirinian, George, eds. (2016). Studies in Comparative Genocide. London: Springer. ISBN 9781349273485.
- Chrétien, Jean-Pierre; Dupaquier, Jean-François (2007). Burundi 1972, au bord des génocides (in French). Paris: Karthala Editions. ISBN 9782845868724.
- Daley, Patricia O. (2008). Gender & Genocide in Burundi : The Search for Spaces of Peace in the Great Lakes Region. African Issues. Bloomington: Indiana University Press. ISBN 978-0-253-35171-5.
- Davis, Morris (1975). Civil Wars and the Politics of International Relief: Africa, South Asia, and the Caribbean. New York: Praeger. ISBN 9780275098704.
- Des Forges, Alison (May 1994). "Burundi: Failed coup or creeping coup?". Current History. 93 (583): 203–207. doi:10.1525/curh.1994.93.583.203. ISSN 0011-3530.
- Kay, Reginald (1987). Burundi Since the Genocide (second ed.). London: Minority Rights Group International. ISBN 9780080308319.
- Krueger, Robert; Krueger, Kathleen Tobin (2007). From Bloodshed to Hope in Burundi : Our Embassy Years During Genocide (PDF). Austin: University of Texas Press. ISBN 9780292714861.
- Kuper, Leo (1981). Genocide: Its Political Use in the Twentieth Century (reprint ed.). New Haven: Yale University Press. ISBN 9780300031201.
- Lemarchand, René (1996). Burundi: Ethnic Conflict and Genocide (1st ed.). Cambridge: Cambridge University Press. ISBN 0-521-56623-1.
- Lemarchand, René (27 June 2008). "The Burundi Killings of 1972". Online Encyclopedia of Mass Violence. Sciences Po.
- Lemarchand, René (2009). The Dynamics of Violence in Central Africa. Philadelphia: University of Pennsylvania Press. ISBN 9780812241204.
- Lemarchand, René (2013). "Burundi 1972: A Forgotten Genocide". Forgotten Genocides : Oblivion, Denial, and Memory. Philadelphia: University of Pennsylvania Press. ISBN 978-0-8122-4335-2.
- Lemarchand, René; Martin, David (1974). Selective Genocide in Burundi (PDF). London: Minority Rights Group International.
- Loft, Francis (1988). "Background to the Massacres in Burundi". Review of African Political Economy. 15 (43): 88–93. doi:10.1080/03056248808703792. JSTOR 4005758.
- Lott, Gaia (July 2018). "On the margins of the Françafrique: Franco-Burundian and Franco-Rwandan bonds from an historical perspective". African Affairs. 117 (468): 347–369. doi:10.1093/afraf/ady013.
- Manirakiza, Désiré (2011). "Les intellectuels burundais face au piège de l'ethnisme". Revue Africaine de Sociologie (in French). 15 (1): 20–47. JSTOR 24487939.
- Melady, Thomas (1974). Burundi: The Tragic Years. New York: Orbis Books. ISBN 0-88344-045-8.
- Nimuraba, Sixte Vigny; Irvin-Erickson, Douglas (2019). "Chapter 9 : Narratives Of Ethnic And Political Conflict In Burundian Sites Of Persuasion". Museums and Sites of Persuasion Politics, Memory and Human Rights. London: Routledge. doi:10.4324/9781138567825-10. S2CID 237121150.
- Rieff, David (2001). "Suffering and Cynicism in Burundi". World Policy Journal. 18 (3) (Fall ed.): 61–68. doi:10.1215/07402775-2001-4002. JSTOR 40209763.
- Russell, Aidan (2019). Politics and Violence in Burundi: The Language of Truth in an Emerging State. Cambridge: Cambridge University Press. ISBN 9781108499347.
- Russell, Aidan (August 2015). "Obedience and selective genocide in Burundi". Africa: The Journal of the International African Institute. 85 (3): 437–456. doi:10.1017/S0001972015000273. ISSN 1750-0184. S2CID 143187212.
- Russell, Aidan (2015). "Rebel and Rule in Burundi, 1972". The International Journal of African Historical Studies. 48 (1): 73–97. JSTOR 44715385.
- Schweiger, Romana (July 2006). "Late Justice For Burundi". The International and Comparative Law Quarterly. 55 (3): 653–670. doi:10.1093/iclq/lei109. JSTOR 4092644.
- Stapleton, Timothy J. (2017). A History of Genocide in Africa. Santa Barbara: ABC-CLIO. ISBN 9781440830525.
- Taylor, Jordan D. (2012). The U.S. response to the Burundi Genocide of 1972 (Masters thesis). James Madison University. OCLC 801507594.
- Turner, Simon (2012). Politics of Innocence: Hutu Identity, Conflict and Camp Life. New York: Berghahn Books. ISBN 9780857456090.
- Uvin, Peter (2013). Life after Violence: A People's Story of Burundi. London: Zed Books. ISBN 9781848137240.
- Watt, Nigel (2008). Burundi : Biography of a Small African County. New York: Columbia University Press. ISBN 978-0-231-70090-0.
- Watt, Nigel (2016) [1st pub. 2008]. Burundi: Biography of a Small African Country (Revised and updated ed.). London: C. Hurst & Co. ISBN 978-1849045094.
- Weinstein, Warren (1975). Chinese and Soviet Aid to Africa. New York: Praeger Publishers. ISBN 978-0-275-09050-0.
- Weinstein, Warren (1974). "Ethnicity and Conflict Regulation: The 1972 Burundi Revolt". Africa Spectrum. 9 (1): 42–49. JSTOR 40173604.
- Weinstein, Warren (1976). Historical Dictionary of Burundi. Metuchen: Scarecrow Press. ISBN 9780810809628.
- Weinstein, Warren (March 1976). "Reviews". The Journal of Modern African Studies. 14 (1): 161–163. doi:10.1017/S0022278X00024071. JSTOR 159655.
