= List of airports in Burundi =

This is a list of airports in Burundi, sorted by location.

== Airports ==
| City served | Province | ICAO | IATA | Airport name | Coordinates | Runway |
|---|---|---|---|---|---|---|
| Bujumbura | Bujumbura Mairie | HBBA | BJM | Melchior Ndadaye International Airport | 3°19′26.2″S 29°19′6.6″E | 17/35: 11,990 x 187, Asphalt |
| Gitega | Gitega | HBBE | GID | Gitega Airport | 3°25′2.9″S 29°54′43.1″E | 12/30: 3,270 x 66, Grass; H1: 82 dia., Grass; H2: 82 dia., GRASS |
| Nyanza-Lac | Makamba | HBBL | | Nyanza-Lac Airport - Closed | 4°20′20.9″S 29°36′2.5″E | Closed |
| Kirundo | Kirundo | HBBO | KRE | Kirundo Airport | 2°32′40.9″S 30°5′41.0″E | 12/30: 3,480 x 75, Grass |

== See also ==
- Transport in Burundi
- List of airports by ICAO code: H#HB - Burundi
- Wikipedia: WikiProject Aviation/Airline destination lists: Africa#Burundi
