= Bugabira =

- Town
- Location within Burundi
- Coordinates: 2.5314°S 30.0706°E
- Country: Burundi
- Province: Kirundo Province
- Commune: Kirundo Commune
- Time zone: UTC+2 (Central Africa Time)

Bugabira is a village of the Commune of Kirundo, in the Kirundo Province of Burundi.

== Location ==
Bugabira is in Kirundo Commune just north of Lake Rwihinda on the road from Kirundo City north to Ruhehe in Bugabira Commune. It is west of Rutare and Kirundo Airport The Köppen climate classification is Aw: Tropical savanna, wet.

== Sources ==
- "Bugabira, Kirundo Province, Burundi", Mindat
- "Node: Bugabira (3130314368)", OpenStreetMap
