= Kiganda =

Kiganda may refer to:

- Kiganda, Murang'a, central Kenya
- Buganda
- Kiganda, Bisoro, Burundi
- Kiganda, Bururi, Burundi
- Kiganda, Muramvya, Burundi
  - Commune of Kiganda, whose seat is in Kiganda, Muramvya
- Kiganda, Rwanda
- Kiganda, Mubende, Uganda
- Kiganda, Kamuli, Uganda
