= Rutare =

- Village
- Location within Burundi
- Coordinates: 2.5376°S 30.1047°E
- Country: Burundi
- Province: Kirundo Province
- Commune: Kirundo Commune
- Time zone: UTC+2 (Central Africa Time)

Rutare is a village of the Commune of Kirundo, in the Kirundo Province of Burundi.

== Location ==
Rutare is in Kirundo Commune just northeast of Lake Rwihinda and Kirundo Airport. It is north of Kirundo City. The village of Bugabira is to the west.

== Facilities ==
The village contains the Kigozi pentecostal church mission and the Rutare Centre de Santé (Health Center). A map issued in 2016 by the Burundi Ministry of Public Health shows the health center as a Centre de Santé Confessionel, or Faith-Based Health Center. The center is privately owned, and served a target population of 10,613 as of 2017. Assessments between 2010 and 2013 showed improvement of quality of service to high levels in terms of hygiene, maternity care and financial management.

A project scheduled for 2017–2018 funded by the German Federal Institute of Geosciences and Natural Resources (BGR) planned to improve the sustainable drinking water supply in the region by two solar-power borehole water pumps, with water distributed to standpipes. The Rukuramigabo borehole in Cewe zone would be rehabilitated and the network extended to the Rutare center. It would serve the 4,200 inhabitants of Cewe and Rutare.

== Sources ==
- Carte Sanitaire du Burundi (PDF), Burundi Ministry of Public Health, 2016
- CDS Rutare, Burundi Ministry of Public Health
- "Node: Rutare (1347150637)", OpenStreetMap
- Projet de réalisation de forages et d’accès à l’eau potable (in French), Seves
- "Rutare Centre de Santé", Google Maps
