= Nyanza-Lac Airport =

Airport in Makamba, Burundi

- IATA: none; ICAO: HBBL

Summary
- Airport type: Closed
- Serves: Nyanza-Lac, Burundi
- Elevation AMSL: 2,559 ft / 780 m
- Coordinates: 4°20′22″S 29°35′50″E

Map
- Location of Nyanza-Lac Airport in Burundi

Runways
| Direction | Length | | Surface |
| Direction | ft | m | Surface |
|---|---|---|---|
Closed
- Source: OurAirports Google Maps

Nyanza-Lac Airport (ICAO: HBBL) was an airstrip serving Nyanza-Lac, a city in the Makamba Province of Burundi.

== See also ==
- Transport in Burundi
- List of airports in Burundi
