= Mutambara =

Mutambara may refer to:

== Places ==
- Mutambara, Manicaland, a village in Zimbabwe
- Mutambara, Burundi, a village in Rumonge province, South of Burundi

== People ==
- Arthur Mutambara (born 1966), Zimbabwean politician

== See also ==
- Mutamba Milambo (born 1984), Congolese football midfielder
