= Muramvya Hospital =

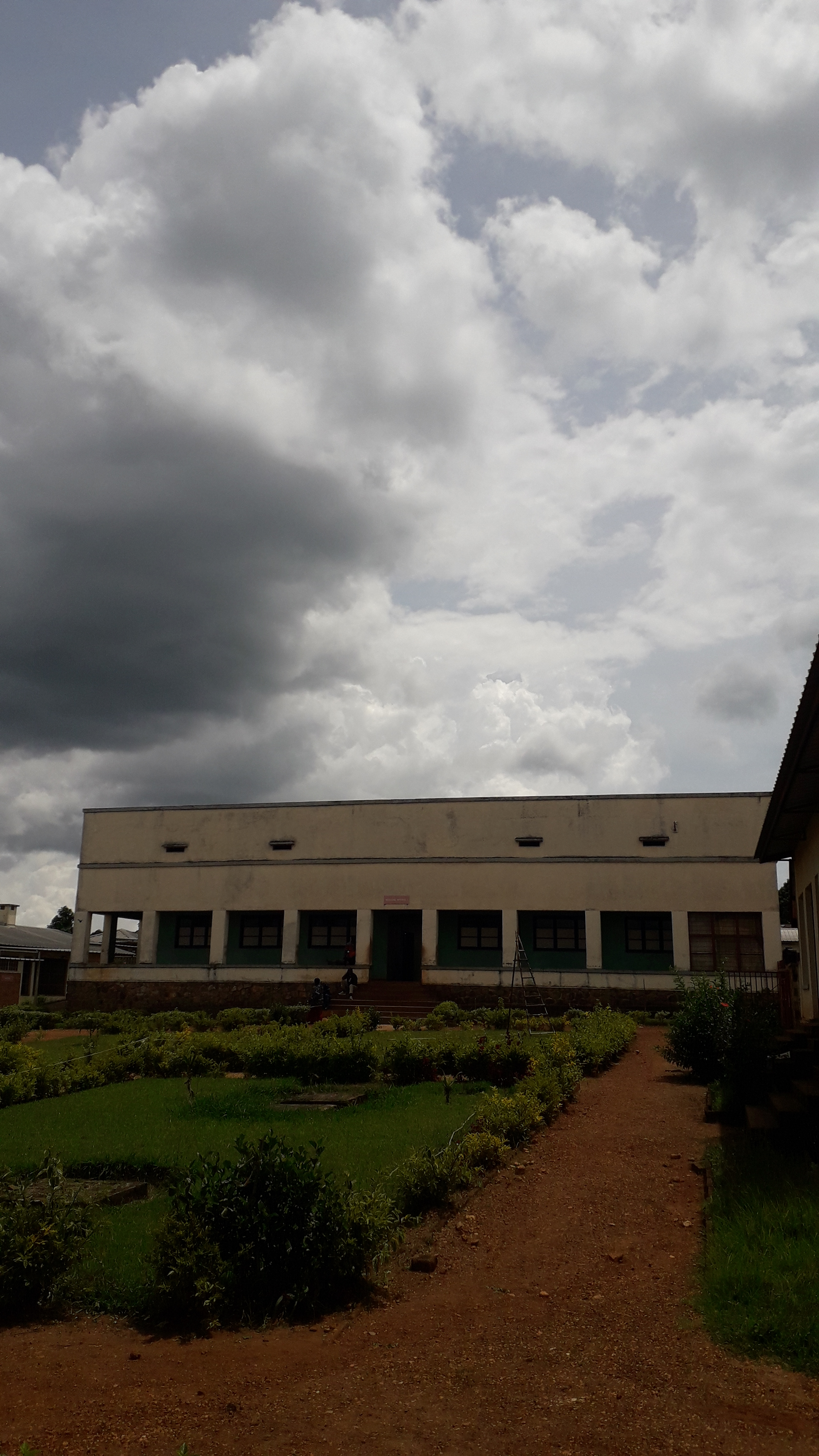
- A wing of the hospital

Geography
- Location: Muramvya Province, Burundi
- Coordinates: 3.2677°S 29.62791°E

Organisation
- Care system: Public

Links
- Lists: Hospitals in Burundi

The Muramvya Regional Hospital (French: Hôpital Régional de Muramvya) is a hospital in Muramvya Province, Burundi.

== Location ==
The Muramvya Hospital is a public district hospital in the Muramvya Health District serving a population of 174,259 as of 2014. It is in the city of Muramvya. As of 2016 it was the only hospital in the district, the western district of two in Muramvya Province. Kiganda Hospital served th eastern district.

== Events ==
In June 2001 there was an outbreak of typhus in Muramvya Province. 126 cases were reported, and Muramvya Hospital recorded nine deaths.

In 2005/2006 Muramvya Hospital and others were investigated by Human Rights Watch for their practice of detaining patients who were unable to pay for their treatment, forcing them to sell possessions or rely on help from relatives to be allowed to leave. About two thirds were surgical patients who could not collect insurance payments, and could not repay the high costs of treatment. Other hospitals investigated were Prince Régent Charles Hospital, Prince Louis Rwagasore Clinic, Roi Khaled Hospital, Gitega Hospital, Ngozi Hospital, Bururi Hospital, Rumonge Hospital and Matana Hospital. Similar practices prevailed at all of them.

In May 2006, without prior warning, the President of Burundi removed user fees in all hospitals and health centers to women giving birth and for children under 5. Although well-intentioned, the immediate effect at Muramvya Hospital was to reduce the hospital's revenue, increase paperwork and reduce the quality of service that could be offered. Between May 2006 and May 2008 a Chinese medical team was stationed at Muramvya Provincial Hospital.

WorldVision reported that in 2012 it had rehabilitated a child nutrition center at the hospital, giving mothers, children and staff access to clean water.

In May 2013 it was reported that Muramvya hospital had gone without water for about five months. The problem was that some of the pipes delivering water had been cut. Due to insecurity in the region, technicians were unable to go to make repairs.

In July 2018 the physiotherapy department was inaugurated at the hospital. The Association for the Promotion of Education and Training Abroad had been active in improving physiotherapy care in Burundi, and led this effort, which was funded by the federal state of Belgium.

As of September 2020 the hospital had 170 employees, of whom 53 were nurses and 6 were doctors. It was cramped, because the original buildings had never been extended.

In an audit in August–September 2022 it was found that the hospital did not have the space needed to accommodate the high numbers of patients. The debt recovery rate was less than 50%. A relatively high number of patients escaped without paying. At this time the hospital had six general practitioners (one under contract), 47 nurses and other medical specialists and administrative staff.

In February 2024 the head doctor of the Muramvya Health District, Jeanne Ndayishimiye, talked to partners from the Kingdom of Belgium who were visiting the province. She said digitization of records was helping in the hospital, and in health centers that had implemented it. The slow video connection to Bujumbura meant that remote consultation during surgery was not practical. There was difficulty retaining doctors trained in surgery. The Muramvya Hospital did not have an ambulance. The Giko Hospital in the Commune of Bukeye had one, but it was in very poor condition.

== Sources ==
- "A High Price to Pay: Detention of Poor Patients in Burundian Hospitals", Human Rights Watch, 7 September 2006
- Carte Sanitaire du Burundi (PDF), Burundi Ministry of Public Health, 2016
- Financement base sur la performance HD Muramvya (in French), Ministere de la Sante Publique et de la Lutte Contre le Sida
- Focus on Water, Sanitation & Hygiene (PDF), WorldVision
- Gahimbare, Grace Divine (8 February 2024), "Muramvya : Les défis du secteur de la santé", Le Renouveau du Burundi (in French)
- Inauguration du service de kinésithérapie de l'Hôpital de District Sanitaire de Muramvya au Burundi (in French), APEFE
- Maniragaba, Mélance (17 May 2023), "Performance des hôpitaux de Cibitoke et de Muramvya : La Cour des comptes identifie les défis", Burundi Eco (in French)
- "Muramvya : plein de sources, mais pas d'eau potable …", Iwacu, 5 May 2013
- Ndaribaze, Kean Marie (19 September 2020), "Muramvya: Le ministre de la santé visite deux hôpitaux", Radio Télévision Nationale du Burundi (in French)
- Nimpagaritse, Manassé; Bertone, Maria Paola (November 2011), "The sudden removal of user fees: the perspective of a frontline manager in Burundi", Health Policy and Planning, 26, Supplement 2, Oxford University Press
- Project ID: 36089 12th medical team dispatched to Muramvya Provincial Hospital, William & Mary
- "Typhus fever kills nine in Burundi", PANAPress, 18 June 2001
