= Mutwenzi =

- Village
- Location within Burundi
- Coordinates: 2.5668347°S 30.0639819°E
- Country: Burundi
- Province: Kirundo Province
- Commune: Kirundo Commune
- Time zone: UTC+2 (Central Africa Time)

Mutwenzi is a village of the Commune of Kirundo, in the Kirundo Province of Burundi.

== Location ==
Mutwenzi is in Kirundo Commune, just southwest of south end of Lake Rwihinda. It is northwest of Kirundo City. The Camp militaire de Mutwenzi is to the south of the village. The Köppen climate classification is Aw: Tropical savanna, wet.

== Novitiate ==
The Frères de Notre-Dame de Miséricorde, an order of Catholic monks. has been active in Burundi since 1961. From 1980 to 1985 they organized a novitiate in Mutwenzi-Kirundo. From 1982 the brothers helped disabled people at the Center for the Handicapped or I.M.P. (Institut Médico Pédagogique) in Mutwenzi-Gitega. In 2021–2022 the Roman Catholic Archdiocese of Gitega nominated Frère Charles Baravuga as chaplain at the Mutwenzi noviciate.

== Military base ==
In March 2016 the second in command of the Mutwenzi camp was ambushed by criminals armed with illegal guns. They shot and killed his bodyguard and injured a policeman who came to help. Stany Misago, administrator of Kirundo Commune, said this sort of incident shows that civilians still have weapons, despite the efforts of the disarmament commission.

In March 2020 it was reported that paramilitary training had started, with 62 Imbonerakure (Note: Imbonerakure are the youth wing of the National Council for the Defense of Democracy – Forces for the Defense of Democracy (CNDD–FDD).) from all parts of the commune gathered on a football field near the military camp. They were taken to a bush area near Lake Rwihinda where they would stay for 24 days while being trained. 23 rifles were provided by the prosecutor of Kirundo Province. The new provincial head of Intelligence, the police commissioner and the head of the military camp were all present when the trainees gathered.

== Sources ==
- "Début ce jeudi des entraînements paramilitaires à Kirundo", RPA (in French), 6 March 2020
- Etat du Personnel Sacerdotal : Notification des Nominations 2021-2022 (PDF) (in French), Archdiocese of Gitega
- Frères de Notre-Dame de Miséricorde, Institut Scheppers
- "Mutwenzi, Kirundo Province, Burundi", Mindat
- "Node: Mutwenzi (3632962719)", OpenStreetMap
- Nyandwi, Dieudonné (31 March 2016), Kirundo/ sécurité: Le commandant en second du camp Mutwenzi échappe à un attentat (in French), Radio Télévision Nationale du Burundi
