= Rwaba River =

River in Burundi

- Location within Burundi
- Native name: Rivière Rwaba (French)

Location
- Country: Burundi
- Province: Makamba Province

Physical characteristics
- Mouth: Lake Tanganyika
  - coordinates: 4.33507°S 29.58760°E

The Rwaba River (French: Rivière Rwaba) is a river in Makamba Province, Burundi, that flows into Lake Tanganyika.

== Course ==
The Rwaba River forms in the northwest of Makamba Province to the north of Murinda and flows south, then southwest to enter Lake Tanganyika just north of Nyanza Lac. The Rwaba River drains the sedimentary plain of Nyanza-Lac, which is about 16 kilometres (9.9 mi) wide and backed by high ground. Open forests on the steep slopes around the plain form a natural water catchment system, and prevent sedimentation of the river and damage from landslides. The river is fed by springs on the slopes or at the foot of the slopes.

== Environment ==
The surroundings of the Rwaba River are a mosaic of agricultural land and natural vegetation. The area is quite densely populated, with 214 inhabitants per square kilometer as of 2016. Savannah climate prevails in the area. The average annual temperature in the area is 21 °C (70 °F). The warmest month is September, when the average temperature is 25 °C (77 °F), and the coldest is November, with 19 °C (66 °F). Average annual rainfall is 1,137 millimetres (44.8 in). The wettest month is December, with an average of 199 millimetres (7.8 in) of precipitation, and the driest is July, with 1 millimetre (0.039 in) of precipitation.

== See also ==
- List of rivers of Burundi

== Sources ==
- de Cliff, Steve; Harerimana, Pierre Claver (2013), "Extraction de l'Huile Essentielle Complète des Fleurs de Cananga Odorata de la Plaine de l'Imbo: Vers la Vulgarisation d'une Nouvelle Filière de Plante Industrielle au Burundi", Revue de l’Université du Burundi -Série Sciences Exactes (in French), no. 28
- NASA Earth Observations: Population Density, NASA/SEDAC, archived from the original on 9 February 2016
- NASA Earth Observations Data Set Index, NASA, archived from the original on 11 May 2020 Temperature data from satellite measurements of the earth's surface temperature within a box that is 0.1 x 0.1 degrees.
- NASA Earth Observations: Rainfall (1 month - TRMM), NASA/Tropical Rainfall Monitoring Mission, archived from the original on 19 April 2019 Average value for the years 2012–2014 within a box that is 0.1 x 0.1 degrees.
- NASA Earth Observations: Land Cover Classification, NASA/MODIS, archived from the original on 28 February 2016
- Newell, E. D.; Vyungimana, F. (September 1997), L’onchocercose est-elle endémique à Nyanza Lac (Burundi) ? (PDF) (in French)
- "Relation: Rwaba (17503409)", OpenStreetMap
- Stratégie Nationale et Plan d’Action sur la Biodiversité 2013-2020 (PDF) (in French), Bujumbura: Institut National pour l’Environnement et la Conservation de la Nature, February 2013
