= Amédée Kabugubugu =

Amédée Kabugubugu (1934/1935–1972) was a Burundian educator, politician, and diplomat.

== Early life ==
Amédée Kabugubugu was born in 1934 or 1935 in Kivoga. He was ethnically Tutsi. He was educated in Gitega and in 1962 received a master's degree in psychology from Lovanium University in the Republic of the Congo.

== Career ==
Kabugubugu served as the director general of the Ministry of Education until June 1963 when he became the minister of education. In 1965 he was made minister of information and immigration. Due to his political independence, Mwami Mwambutsa IV asked him to resign, and he was made a counselor at the Burundian embassy in Belgium. In 1966 served as an ambassador to UNESCO. He taught psychology courses at Official University of Burundi in 1967. In March 1969 he was made an assistant professor.

During the Ikiza in 1972, Military Governor of Ngozi Province Joseph Bizoza had six Tutsi officials killed including Kabugubugu. Bizoza had a long-standing grudge against Kabugubugu. He later stated that he had mistaken Kabugubugu and another Tutsi official as Hutus.

== Works cited ==
- Chrétien, Jean-Pierre; Dupaquier, Jean-François (2007). Burundi 1972, au bord des génocides (in French). Paris: Karthala Editions. ISBN 9782845868724.
- Lemarchand, René (1996). Burundi: Ethnic Conflict and Genocide (1st ed.). Cambridge: Cambridge University Press. ISBN 0-521-56623-1.
- Weinstein, Warren (1976). Historical Dictionary of Burundi. Metuchen: Scarecrow Press. ISBN 9780810809628.
- Russell, Aidan (2019). Politics and Violence in Burundi: The Language of Truth in an Emerging State. Cambridge: Cambridge University Press. ISBN 9781108499347.
