= Gitega Airport =

Airport in Burundi

- IATA: GID; ICAO: HBBE

Summary
- Airport type: Public
- Serves: Gitega, Burundi
- Elevation AMSL: 5,741 ft / 1,750 m
- Coordinates: 3°25′05″S 29°54′45″E

Map
- Location of airport in Burundi

Runways
Direction	Length		Surface
Direction	m	ft	Surface
12/30	990	3,248	Grass
- Source: GCM Google Maps SkyVector

Gitega Airport (IATA: GID, ICAO: HBBE) is an airport serving the city of Gitega, the current capital of Burundi (and capital of the Gitega Province). The airport is situated on a low ridge in the northwest section of the city.

The Bujumbura VOR-DME (Ident: BJA) is located 35.6 nautical miles (65.9 km) west of the airport. The Gitega non-directional beacon (Ident: GI) is located on the field.

== See also ==
- Transport in Burundi
- List of airports in Burundi
