= Jacques Sémelin =

French historian and political scientist

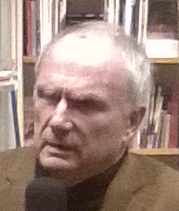
- Portrait of Sémelin during a talk at a book shop in Côte-des-Neiges, 2017
- Born: 1951 (age 74–75); Le Plessis-Robinson, Île-de-France, French Fourth Republic
- Occupation: Historian

Academic background
- Education: Paris Descartes University
- Alma mater: Paris IV
- Influences: Léon Poliakov

Academic work
- Discipline: History
- Sub-discipline: Contemporary history
- Main interests: Genocide studies
- Notable works: OEMV

Jacques Sémelin is a French historian and political scientist. He is a professor at Sciences Po Paris and senior researcher at the French National Centre for Scientific Research (CNRS). His main fields of study are the Holocaust, mass violence, civil resistance and rescue in genocidal situations, and more recently the survival of Jews in France during the Second World War. In 1998, he created a pioneering course on genocides and massacres at Sciences Po Paris. He is the founder of the Online Encyclopedia of Mass Violence.

== Biography ==
Sémelin has a transdisciplinary education in contemporary history, social psychology and political science. He obtained his PhD in Contemporary History at the Sorbonne (Paris IV, 1986) and was Post-Doctoral Fellow at Harvard University at the Center for International Affairs (1986–1988). Previously, he was a social and clinical psychologist as a former master graduate from the Paris Institute of Psychology. In 1990, he joined the CNRS as a Research Fellow in Political Science. He started teaching at the Ecole des Hautes études en Sciences Sociales and joined Sciences Po Paris in 1998, where he created a pioneering transdisciplinary course on genocide and extreme violence.

Much of Sémelin's work is concerned with the question of how "ordinary people" can commit "extraordinary crimes" such as genocide. He also studies civil resistance and the ways that unarmed civilians have resisted authoritarian and totalitarian regimes.

Sémelin devoted his PhD studies to the comparative analysis of some 30 examples of civil resistance in Nazi Europe, summarized in his book Unarmed Against Hitler (1994), available now in five languages. Following this research, he then inquired about the development of civil resistance in Communist Europe (through media strategies) until the fall of the Berlin Wall. He published his results in a new book, Freedom Over the Airwaves (1997; published in English in 2016 by the International Center on Nonviolent Conflict ( )). In 2014, he received the James Lawson Award for his research, awarded at Tufts University by the International Center on Nonviolent Conflict.

Meanwhile, Sémelin became increasingly engaged in holocaust genocide studies, especially after visiting Auschwitz. He began to work on his master book on mass violence: Purify and Destroy (2007), available now in eight languages. For this book, he was awarded a prize by the Association Française de Science Politique and received the Figaro-Sciences Po Prize in 2007. In 2008, Sémelin founded massviolence.org at Sciences Po under the sponsorship of Simone Veil and Esther Mujawayo. This online encyclopedia is no longer active due to a lack of funds but the archives are still available online.

In 2010, Sémelin was appointed as consultant to the United Nations for the genocide prevention (Office of political affairs).

Sémelin has also initiated a new research program on rescue in genocidal situations. He is co-founder of the Lieu de Mémoire, a museum chronicling the French Resistance, in Chambon-sur-Lignon, where Jewish children and adults were saved during the Nazi occupation. In 2006, Sémelin co-directed an international symposium on genocidal rescue practices at Sciences Po. The proceedings were published in 2010, under the title Resisting Genocide.

Subsequently, Sémelin engaged in a study to understand how 75% of Jews in France survived the Holocaust. The resulting book, Persécutions et entraides dans la France occupée (2013), was awarded the Prix Phillipe Viannay by the Fondation de la Résistance and the "Emerald" Prize of the Académie Française. Taking into account the many debates aroused by his book, especially with American historian Robert Paxton, Sémelin wrote an abridged and revised version, published in 2018 and prefaced by Serge Klarsfeld (reference), under the title The Survival of the Jews in France, 1940–44. This book has been published in English by Oxford University Press (USA) and Hurst (UK) and in German at Wallstein.

In his autobiographical book J'arrive où je suis étranger (2007) (I Arrive Where I Feel a Stranger), Sémelin speaks openly about his struggle against an inexorable blindness. In 2016, he also published Je veux croire au soleil, a humorous account of his stay in Montréal as a visually impaired professor, based on anecdotes from everyday life.

== Published works ==
- Semelin, Jacques (1993), Unarmed against Hitler: Civil resistance in Europe, 1939-1943, Praeger, ISBN 0-275-93960-X
- Sémelin, Jacques (2002), Non-violence explained to my children, Da Capo Lifelong Books, ISBN 978-1569245156
- Semelin, Jacques (2009), Purify and Destroy: The Political Uses of Massacre and Genocide, Columbia University Press, ISBN 978-0231142830
- Semelin, Jacques (2010), Resisting Genocide: The multiple forms of rescue, Columbia University Press
- Sémelin, Jacques (2016 [1997]), Freedom over the Airwaves: From the Czech Coup to the Fall of the Berlin Wall, International Center On Non-violent Conflict, ISBN 978-1943271078
- Sémelin, Jacques (2019), The survival of the Jews in France, Oxford University Press/Hurst, ISBN 978-1-78738-014-1

=== On his journey to blindness ===
- Sémelin, Jacques (2007), J’arrive où je suis étranger, Seuil, ISBN 978-2020883986
- Sémelin, Jacques (2016), Je veux croire au soleil, Les Arènes, ISBN 978-2352045113
