= Eustache Ngabisha =

Burundian politician

Eustache Ngabisha (d. 1972 in Ngozi, Burundi) was a Burundian politician, and the father of Burundian president Pierre Nkurunziza.

Ngabisha, who was Hutu and Roman Catholic, was an associate of Louis Rwagasore in the early 1960s, and subsequently became involved in politics, joining UPRONA.

In 1965, he was elected to a term in the Parliament of Burundi, and later served as governor of Ngozi Province and Kayanza Province (also described as the "director" of Kabezi, and the "commissioner of the district (Ngozi-Kayanza)").

During the 1972 genocide in Burundi, Ngabisha was imprisoned in Ngozi, and subsequently strangled in his cell with his own necktie.
