= Kiganda Hospital =

- Location within Burundi

Geography
- Location: Muramvya Province, Burundi
- Coordinates: 3.3476°S 29.6847°E

Organisation
- Care system: Public

Links
- Lists: Hospitals in Burundi

The Kiganda Hospital (French: Hôpital Kiganda) is a hospital in Muramvya Province, Burundi.

== Location ==
The Kiganda Hospital is in the south of the village of Kiganda. It is a public hospital in the Kiganda Health District serving a population of 178,544 as of 2014. As of 2016 it was the only hospital in the district, the eastern district of two in Muramvya Province. The Muramvya Hospital is the district hospital of the western, Muramvya Hospital District.

== History ==
The hospital was built in the 1950s as a health center. Extensive rehabilitation of existing infrastructure, new buildings and equipment, and a secure water supply were needed to transform it into a district hospital that meets the standards.

A tender with plans for the upgrades was prepared in 2010, but missed several important aspects including moving the health center, operation of the hospital during the work, the flow of patients and staff and management of rainwater, electricity and waste water. In 2014 the Kiganda district hospital was rehabilitated and built according to standards. At this time it was serving a population of almost 200,000.

In July 2019 Dr Thaddée Ndikumana, Minister of Public Health and the Fight against AIDS, made a working visit to the hospital, which had just been rehabilitated and expanded by the Kingdom of Belgium. He agreed that there were not enough staff at all levels, and promised that more would be assigned to the Kiganda hospital. In November 2019 Joseph Butore, Second Vice President of Burundi, inaugurated new buildings at the hospital.

In August 2023 it was reported that about thirty contract workers in the hospital were demanding that they be treated according to the new salary policy. Like other civil servants they should be paid based on their diplomas and seniority.
