= Commune of Burambi =

- Commune
- Location within Burundi
- Coordinates: 3°49′02″S 29°22′40″E
- Country: Burundi
- Province: Burunga
- Administrative center: Burambi

Area
  - Total: 280.84 km^{2} (108.43 sq mi)

Population (2008 census)
  - Total: 57,167
  - Density: 203.56/km^{2} (527.21/sq mi)
- Time zone: UTC+2 (Central Africa Time)

Burambi is a commune of Burunga in southwestern Burundi. The capital of the commune is Burambi. It has a population of 57,167 people (last recorded in 2008).
