= Kiganda, Muramvya =

Kiganda
- village
- Location within Burundi
- Coordinates: 3.343°S 29.6869°E
- Country: Burundi
- Province: Muramvya Province
- Commune: Commune of Kiganda

Kiganda is a village, center of the Commune of Kiganda, Muramvya Province, Burundi.

== Location ==
Kiganda is in the south of Muramvya Province, southeast of the provincial capital, Muramvya. It is on the RP31 road which runs north from Mwaro Province into Muramvya Province and continues north from Kiganda to join the RN2 highway at Nkonyovu. It contains a hospital, a football field and a church, and the historical site of the Treaty of Kiganda.

The Köppen climate classification is Cwb : Subtropical highland climate or temperate oceanic climate with dry winters.

== Historical site ==
Before the colonial era, each king or clan of Burundi had his own capital, with a palace surrounded by homes, places of worship and store houses. The main capitals were in the present Muramvya Province at Mbuye, Muramvya, Bukeye and Kiganda.

From 1881 the state of Ingoma Y'Uburundi was attacked by the European colonial powers. At the Berlin Conference of 1884-1885 "Urundi" was ceded to the Germans. In 1895 the Germans entered Burundi from Rwanda, but were defeated in the battles of Ruvubu (1896) and Uzige and Muyaga (1898). In June 1899 at the Battle of Ndaga, Captain Robert von Bering used Mexican machine guns to decisively defeat the Barundi. Later that year, in the Second Battle of Muyaga the Germans were forced to retreat to Tanganyika.

After further fighting, the Germans proposed a treaty to Mwezi IV of Burundi (Mwezi Gisabo), which was signed in Kiganda on 6 June 1903. The Treaty of Kiganda acknowledged the independence of Ingoma y’Uburundi, while making concessions to the Germans including the military station of Usumbura and the Catholic mission of Mugera. The place where the treaty was signed is now a tourist site.

== Hospital ==
The Kiganda Hospital is in the south of the village. It is a public hospital in the Kiganda Health District serving a population of 178,544 as of 2014.

== Sources ==
- "Burundi : Retour sur les 121 ans du Traité de Kiganda", AGnews, 20 June 2024
- Financement base sur la performance HD Kiganda (in French), Ministere de la Sante Publique et de la Lutte Contre le Sida
- "Kiganda, Muramvya Province, Burundi", Mindat
- "Muramvya, Mpotsa et Nkiko-Mugamba", World Heritage Site
- "Node: Kiganda (3041822064)", OpenStreetMap
- The Speaker of the National Assembly has visited Kiganda commune, 8 November 2021
- "Way: Hôpital Kiganda (210931901)", OpenStreetMap
