= Commune of Makamba =

- Commune
- Location within Burundi
- Coordinates: 4°8′5″S 29°48′18″E
- Country: Burundi
- Province: Makamba Province
- Administrative center: Makamba

Area
  - Total: 325.08 km^{2} (125.51 sq mi)
- Elevation: 1,472 m (4,829 ft)

Population (2008 census)
  - Total: 93,558
  - Density: 287.80/km^{2} (745.40/sq mi)
- Time zone: UTC+2 (Central Africa Time)

The commune of Makamba is a commune of Makamba Province in southern Burundi. The capital lies at Makamba. In 2007, DGHER electrified one rural village in the commune.
