= Commune of Mabanda =

- Commune
- Location within Burundi
- Coordinates: 4°16′29″S 29°47′12″E
- Country: Burundi
- Province: Makamba Province
- Administrative center: Mabanda
- Time zone: UTC+2 (Central Africa Time)

The commune of Mabanda is a commune of Makamba Province in southern Burundi. The capital lies at Mabanda.
