= Collines =

Collines may refer to:

- Collines Department, Benin
- Collines of Burundi
