= David E. Mark =

American diplomat

David Everett Mark (November 15, 1923 – September 17, 2005) was a career officer in the United States Foreign Service.

Born in New York City to Leslie Mark (ne Lazarus Macht) and Lena Tyor Mark, Mark graduated from Columbia University, and while serving in the Army Air Corps during World War II, he completed his studies at Columbia Law School. He joined the U.S. Foreign Service in 1946, serving first in South Korea, Germany, Finland, Romania and Moscow in the 1950s.

Mark met his wife, Elisabeth Ann Lewis, in Moscow in 1958 where she headed the Anglo-American school. They married in Washington, D.C. in 1959, and moved to Geneva, Switzerland where Mark joined the delegation to the Test Ban Treaty negotiations. 1963-1964 he attended the Harvard International Seminar run by Henry Kissinger.

In the early 1960s, Mark served in various capacities in INR at the U.S. State Department until his appointment as United States Ambassador to Burundi from 1974 to 1977. From 1979 to 1981 he served again at the State Department as a Deputy Assistant Secretary of State. After retirement from government in 1981, he consulted on international affairs for ALCOA in Pittsburgh, Pennsylvania.

Mark spoke fluent Russian, German, and French, and was conversant in Portuguese, Spanish, Italian, and Japanese. With the break-up of the Soviet Union in 1989 and the dearth of Russian linguists, Mark was asked to help establish the American Embassy in the former Soviet Republic of Georgia. He returned to Tbilisi in 1992 to participate in helping the Georgians write their Constitution.

During the 1990s until his death, Mark was an active member of the Council on Foreign Relations in New York City. He volunteered every week for nine years as a guide and translator for Big Apple Greeters of New York. He worked full-time as a licensed New York City tour guide for Gray Line/CoachUSA. When he was not volunteering and touring on the Gray Line bus tours, Mark taught a variety of courses as an adjunct professor of global affairs at New York University.

Ambassador Mark died in a car accident in 2005 at age 81.

Diplomatic posts
Preceded by Robert L. Yost	U.S. Ambassador to Burundi; 1974–1977	Succeeded by Thomas J. Corcoran
