= Robert L. Yost =

American diplomat

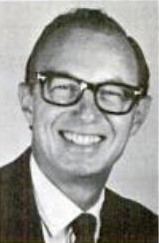
- Yost, circa 1972

4th Ambassador of the United States to Burundi
- In office August 19, 1972 – May 26, 1974
- President: Richard Nixon
- Preceded by: Thomas P. Melady
- Succeeded by: David E. Mark

Personal details
- Born: Robert Lloyd Yost; 1907 Kirkland, Washington, United States of America
- Died: May 29, 1990 (aged 82–83) Berkeley, California, United States of America
- Education: University of California (1942); George Washington University (I.R.)

Robert Lloyd Yost (1922 Kirkland, Washington – May 29, 1990 Berkeley, California) was an American career Foreign Service officer who was the United States Ambassador to Burundi from 1972 to 1974 and to the Dominican Republic from 1978 until 1982, when he retired.

During Yost's tenure in Burundi, the Ikiza was happening. This was a major concern for President Richard Nixon and after many attempts to bring about a resolution, Yost was recalled by Nixon “as a first step in an informal break of diplomatic relations with Burundi’s “butchers”“ as Nixon referred to them.

Yost was an Army veteran of World War II. He graduated from the University of California, Los Angeles in 1942 and received a master's degree in international relations from George Washington University. He was a graduate of the National War College.

A resident of Oakland, California, Yost died of liver failure at Alta Bates Hospital in Berkeley, California.
