= Commune of Kibago =

- Commune
- Location within Burundi
- Coordinates: 4°17′26″S 29°50′57″E
- Country: Burundi
- Province: Makamba Province
- Administrative center: Kibago
- Time zone: UTC+2 (Central Africa Time)

The commune of Kibago is a commune of Makamba Province in southern Burundi. The capital lies at Kibago.
