= Commune of Kirundo =

- Commune
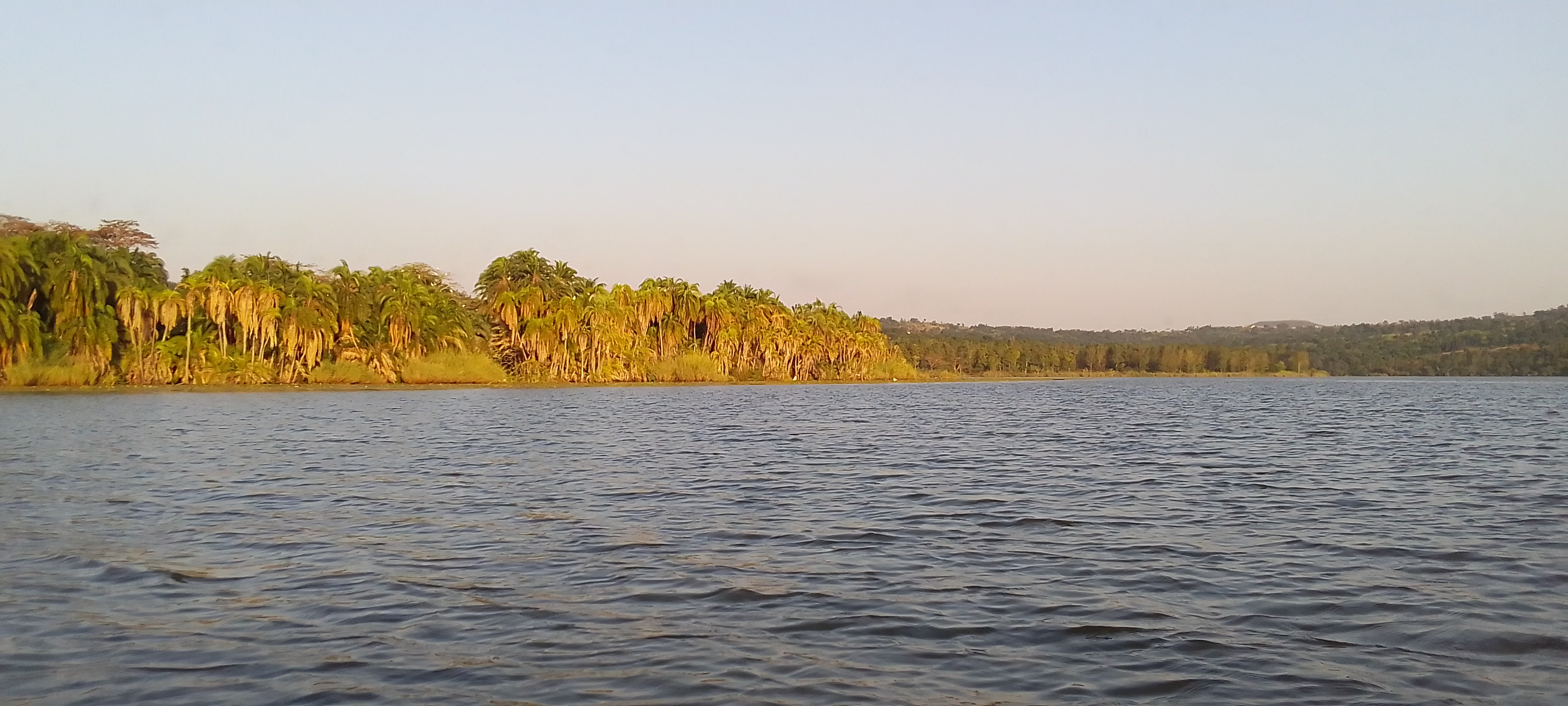
- Lake Rwihinda

- Location within Burundi
- Coordinates: 2°35′5″S 30°5′50″E
- Country: Burundi
- Province: Kirundo Province
- Administrative center: Kirundo

Area
  - Total: 207.29 km^{2} (80.04 sq mi)
- Elevation: 1,526 m (5,007 ft)

Population (2008 census)
  - Total: 93,110
- Time zone: UTC+2 (Central Africa Time)

The Commune of Kirundo is a commune of Kirundo Province in northern Burundi.

== Location ==
The Commune of Kirundo has an area of 207.3 square kilometres (80.0 sq mi) and had a population of 93,110 as of the 2008 census.

== Environment ==
The Rwihinda Lake Nature Reserve is in Kirundo commune, to the west of Kirundo Airport. Marshes extend northwest from the reserve to the Akanyaro River, which forms the border with Rwanda. Lake Rwihinda has been threatened by lack of rain since 1999 and excessive evapotranspiration.

== Administrative divisions ==
Settlements include the provincial capital of Kirundo; Rutare, to the north of the airport; and Mutwenzi, near to the Mutwenzi military base.

Kirundo is divided into 22 collines, from north to south:

- Ceru
- Runyonza
- Yaranda
- Cewe
- Nyabibugu
- Kavomo
- Bugera
- Kinyangurube
- 1Murama
- Mwenya
- Kanyinya
- Mutara
- Kirundo
- Rambo
- Gihosha
- Gakana
- Rugero
- Mataka
- Gikuyo
- Karamagi
- Cumva
- Busenyi

== Sources ==
- Akanyaru wetlands, Birdlife
- "BURUNDI: Administrative Division", City Population
- "Burundi / Kirundo / Kirundo", GADM
- Risper Nyairo; Takashi Machimura; Takanori Matsui (24 May 2020), "A Combined Analysis of Sociological and FarmbManagement Factors Affecting Household Livelihood Vulnerability to Climate Change in Rural Burundi", Sustainability, 12 (10): 4296, doi:10.3390/su12104296
- United States. Foreign Broadcast Information Service (1982). Sub-Saharan Africa report. Foreign Broadcast Information Service.
