= Commune of Kiganda =

Coordinates: 3°21′09″S 29°40′48″E

- Commune
- Interactive map of Commune of Kiganda
- Country: Burundi
- Province: Muramvya Province
- Administrative center: Kiganda
- Time zone: UTC+2 (Central Africa Time)

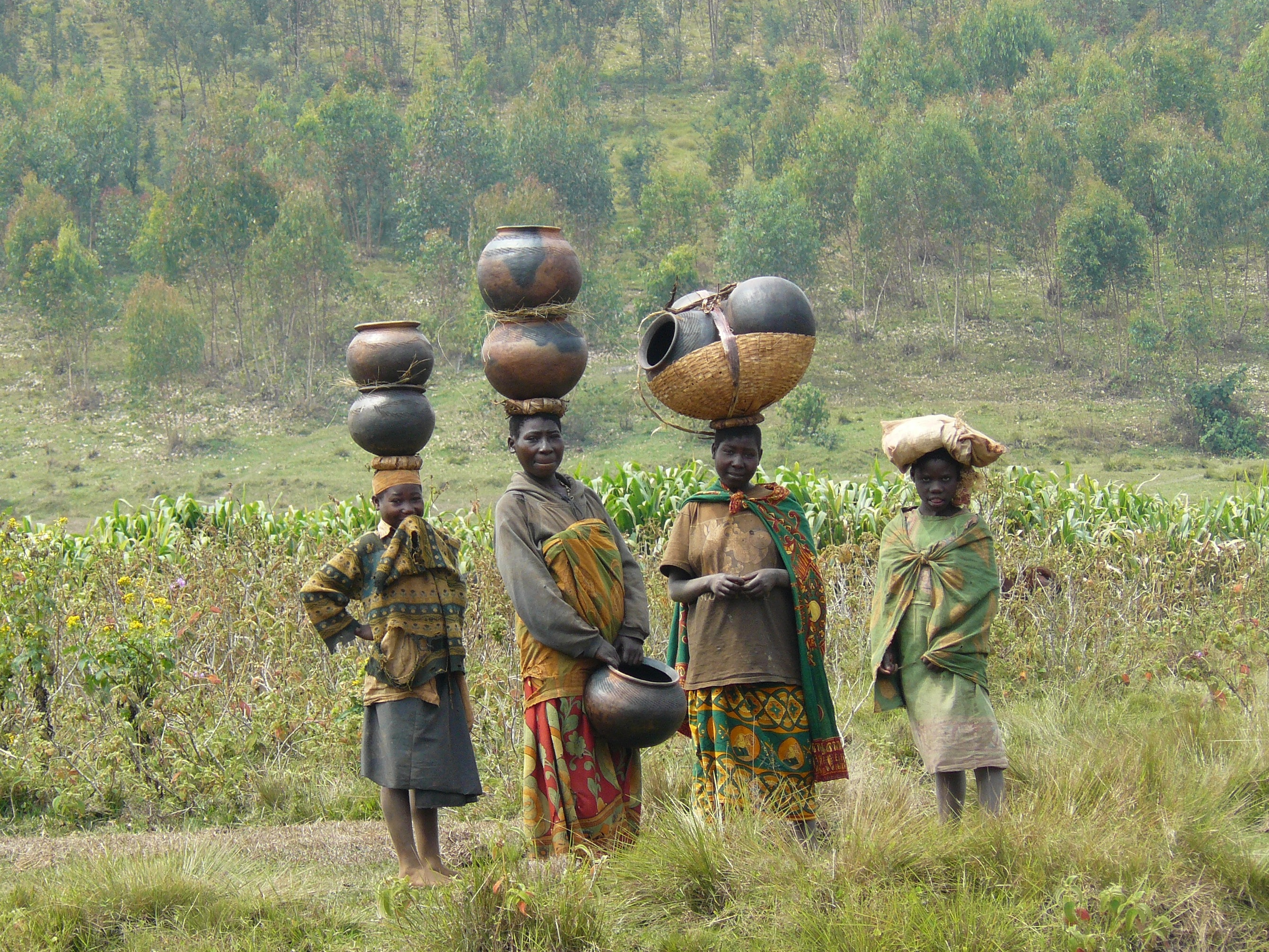
Batwa women with traditional pots in the Commune of Kiganda, July 2007.

The commune of Kiganda is a commune of Muramvya Province in central-western Burundi. The capital lies at Kiganda. In 2007, DGHER electrified one rural village in the commune.
