= Commune of Nyanza-Lac =

- Commune
- Location within Burundi
- Coordinates: 4°16′19″S 29°35′46″E
- Country: Burundi
- Province: Makamba Province
- Administrative center: Nyanza-Lac
- Time zone: UTC+2 (Central Africa Time)

The commune of Nyanza-Lac is a commune of Makamba Province in southern Burundi. The capital lies at Nyanza-Lac.
