= Commune of Kayogoro =

- Commune
- Location within Burundi
- Country: Burundi
- Province: Makamba Province
- Administrative center: Kayogoro
- Time zone: UTC+2 (Central Africa Time)

The commune of Kayogoro is a commune of Makamba Province in southern Burundi. The capital lies at Kayogoro.
