= Commune of Vugizo =

- Commune
- Location within Burundi
- Country: Burundi
- Province: Makamba Province
- Administrative center: Vugizo
- Time zone: UTC+2 (Central Africa Time)

The commune of Vugizo is a commune of Makamba Province in southern Burundi. The capital lies at Vugizo.
