= Rumonge Hospital =

- Location within Burundi

Geography
- Location: Rumonge, Rumonge Province, Burundi
- Coordinates: 3.97554°S 29.43945°E

Organisation
- Care system: Public

Links
- Website: www.hopitalrumonge.bi
- Lists: Hospitals in Burundi

The Rumonge Regional Hospital (French: Hôpital régional Rumonge) is a hospital in Rumonge Province, Burundi.

== Location ==
The Rumonge Hospital is a hospital in the city of Rumonge, in the west of the Rumonge Health District. It is the only hospital in the district. It is a public regional hospital. The hospital has beds for intensive care and long-term care, and specialized facilities for surgery, cardiology and neurology.

== History ==
The present hospital has its origins as a dispensary created in 1922 during the Belgian colonial period. Over the years it steadily expanded, until today it can accommodate a large number of patients.

In May 2013 it was reported that the administrative and financial director of the hospital had been arrested by the anti-corruption brigade in November, accused of embezzlement of public funds and illicit enrichment. He had spent several months in a luxury hotel because the house provided by the hospital was not convenient to him. He owned several assets, notably travel agencies, whose origin could not be explained.

In August 2013 it was reports that the hospital was in financial difficulties, with high levels on money owing to it, and large amounts owed to others. The pharmacy was almost empty, and there were not enough funds to pay the staff regularly. The main debtors were the Ministry of National Solidarity, the Ministry of Public Health, the police, the army and the civil service mutual fund. Prices of supplies and equipment continued to rise, while charges for care were pegged.

In 2017 Médecins Sans Frontières Switzerland was providing technical support for early stages of a project to rebuild and rehabilitate the hospital's emergency department. In September 2019 Pierre Nkurunziza, President of Burundi, inaugurated the maternity block on the upper floor of the hospital. It had been built by local citizens with financial support from economic partners or investors.

== Sources ==
- Carte Sanitaire du Burundi (PDF), Burundi Ministry of Public Health, 2016
- Financement base sur la performance HR Rumonge (in French), Ministere de la Sante Publique et de la Lutte Contre le Sida
- "Inauguration du bloc de maternité de l'hôpital de Rumonge", AGnews, 20 September 2019
- Nos Services (in French), Rumonge Hospital
- Nzorubonanya, Félix (26 August 2013), "L'hôpital de Rumonge est gravement malade", Iwacu (in French)
- Préparation de la construction du service d’urgence de l’hôpital de Rumonge, Burundi (in French), Interacta
- Qui Sommes Nous? (in French), Rumonge Hospital
- "Rumonge-Corruption : un cadre de l'hôpital est sous les verrous", Iwacu (in French), 5 May 2013
