= Online Encyclopedia of Mass Violence =

The Online Encyclopedia of Mass Violence (OEMV) is an online encyclopedia with the objective of documenting massacres which have occurred in the 20th century.

The project was founded by Jacques Sémelin. The Centre d’Etudes et de Recherches Internationales, Sciences Po (Paris), and the Centre National de la Recherche Scientifique and The Hamburg Institute for Social Research are working on the project. Claire Andrieu (Sciences Po Paris) is currently supervising the project.
