= Muramvya =

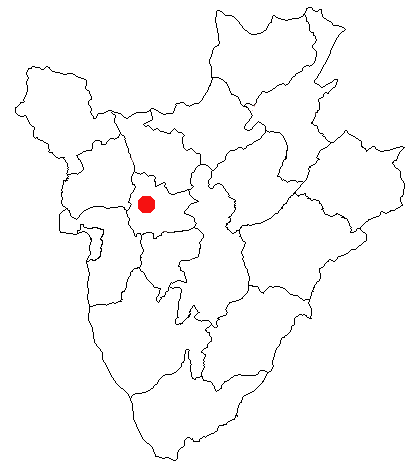

- Location in Burundi
- Coordinates: 3°15′S 29°36′E
- Country: Burundi
- Province: Gitega Province
- Elevation: 1,895 m (6,217 ft)

Population (2008)
  - Total: 5,458

Muramvya is a city located in Gitega Province in central Burundi. It was the capital city of the former Muramvya Province.

Muramvya is home to the Muramvya Regional Hospital. Since 1982 the city has received electricity from the nearby Gikonge Hydroelectric Power Station on the Mubarazi River.

== Sources ==
- Carte Sanitaire du Burundi (PDF), Burundi Ministry of Public Health, 2016
- Financement base sur la performance HD Muramvya (in French), Ministere de la Sante Publique et de la Lutte Contre le Sida
- "Way: Centrale hydroélectrique Gikonge (304015929)", OpenStreetMap
- Zimmermann, Robert; Inversin, Allen (February 1983), Burundi: Institutional requirements and technical alternatives for a small hydropower program (PDF), United States Agency for International Development, archived from the original (PDF) on February 27, 2017
