= Rumonge =

Capital of Rumonge Province, Burundi

- Location in Burundi
- Coordinates: 3°58′S 29°26′E
- Country: Burundi
- Province: Rumonge Province

Population (2008)
  - Total: 35,931

Rumonge is the capital city of Rumonge Province, Burundi, and a port on the shores of Lake Tanganyika. It is a significant transit point on the lake for trade into Burundi and other parts of East Africa.

Many of the city's residents were displaced by flooding in 2024, and 2025 attacks by the militant March 23 Movement in the eastern Democratic Republic of the Congo disrupted trade to Rumonge.

== History ==
In May 2024, hundreds of families in Rumonge, particularly in the Kanyenkoko district, had to leave their homes due to flooding caused by the Murembwe River overflowing to meet the rising water levels of Lake Tanganyika. Some families were housed inside Rumonge Hospital, others were placed in Mutambara, and hundreds rented houses nearby. Fields of rice, cassava, banana, and sweet potato along the river were also flooded, and the palm groves damaged.

The Goma and Bukavu military offensives by the March 23 Movement in early 2025 severely reduced trade in Rumonge. The Congolese rebel group's attacks displaced hundreds of thousands of civilians, resulting in merchants and customers from those cities no longer visiting Rumonge's port.

== Demographics ==
The 2008 census recorded a population of 35,931 in Rumonge, making it Burundi's fourth largest city.

== Hospital ==
Rumonge Hospital is a public regional hospital. It serves the Rumonge Health District. The hospital originated as a dispensary constructed in 1922 during the Belgian colonial period. Over the years it steadily expanded, and at present it can accommodate a large number of patients.

== Transportation ==
Rumonge is the location of Burundi's only major landing site.
