= René Lemarchand =

French-American political scientist (born 1932)

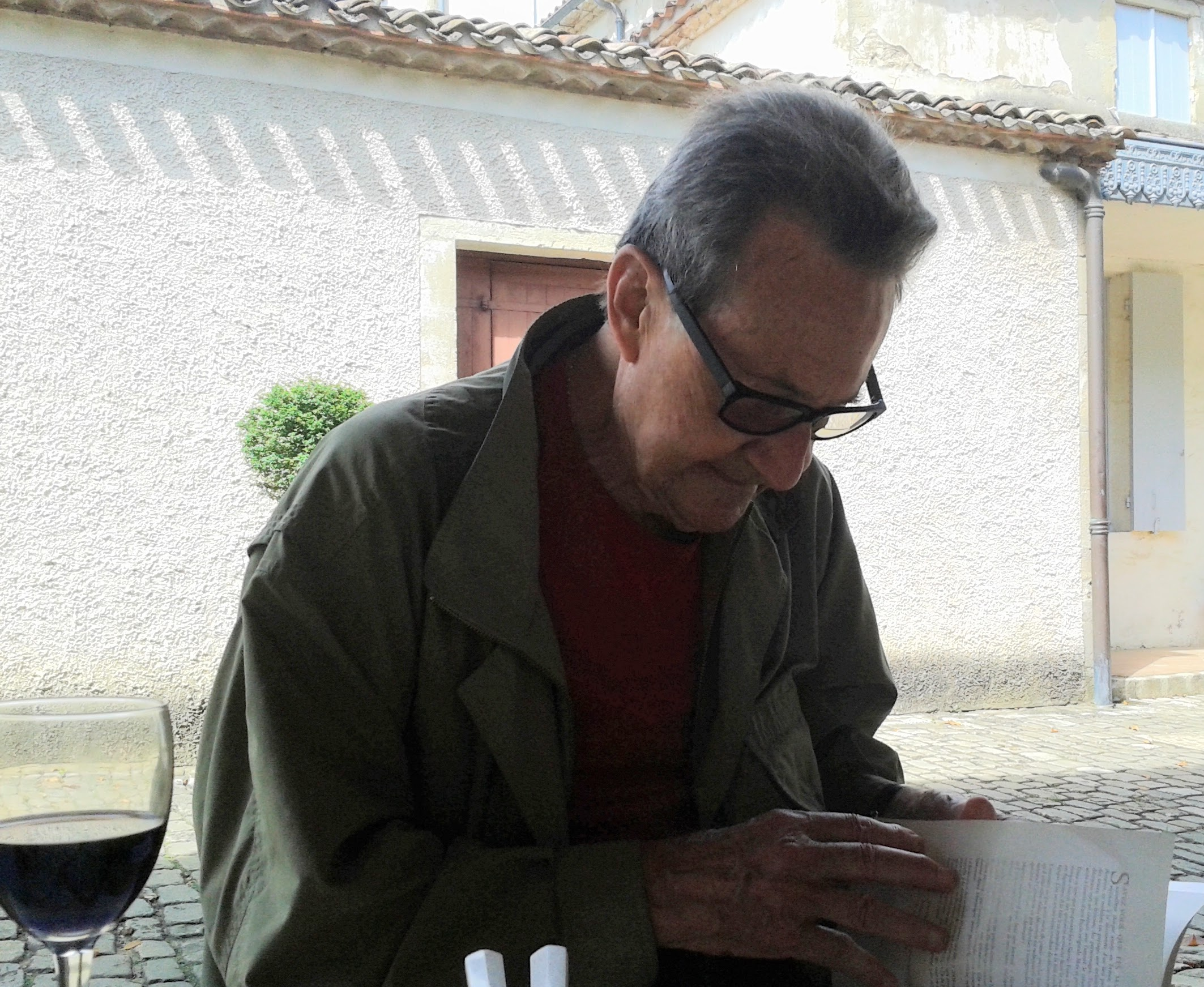
- Lemarchand in 2014
- Born: 1932 (age 93–94); France
- Education: UCLA
- Known for: Research on ethnic conflict and genocide in Rwanda, Burundi and Darfur
- Awards: African Studies Association Melville J. Herskovits Award for Rwanda and Burundi, 1971
- Scientific career
- Fields: Political science
- Workplaces: University of Florida

René Lemarchand (born 1932) is a French-American political scientist who is known for his research on ethnic conflict and genocide in Rwanda, Burundi and Darfur. Publishing in both English and French, he is particularly known for his work on the concept of clientelism. He is a Professor Emeritus at the University of Florida, and continues to write, teach internationally and consult. Since retiring he has worked for USAID (Agency for International Development, Department of State) out of Abidjan, Côte d'Ivoire as a Regional Consultant for West Africa in Governance and Democracy, and as Democracy and Governance advisor to USAID / Ghana.

== Early life and education ==
René Lemarchand was born in 1932 in France. After doing undergraduate work in France, he went to the United States for doctoral studies in political science. He completed his Ph.D. at the University of California, Los Angeles (UCLA), specializing in studies of Central Africa.

== Career ==
Lemarchand joined the political science faculty of the University of Florida in late 1962. He became the first Director of the Center for African Studies at UF and served in that position until 1965. He worked at UF for his entire academic career. He has specialized in political issues in African nations, especially ethnic conflicts leading to warfare, and has published works in both French and English.

In July 1971, while on a two-month research trip to Chad, Lemarchand was arrested and charged with visiting a restricted zone and failing to respond to a summons by the country's president. He was released at the end of August 1971.

Lemarchand received a Fulbright award for June–September 1983 to lecture in political science at the University of Zimbabwe, Salisbury, Zimbabwe. He also received a Fulbright for July 1987–January 1988 for research in political science at the University of Chad, N'djamena, Chad and the University of Lagos, Lagos, Nigeria.

Lemarchand has become an expert in ethnic populations and conflicts, such as that in Burundi, the Rwandan genocide in 1994, and Darfur. He is internationally known as an expert on the cycle of violence in Central Africa. He has taught as a visiting professor at universities in Europe, Africa and North America.

Now professor emeritus of political science at the University of Florida, Lemarchand has worked as a consultant in governance for the USAID in Abidjan, Côte d'Ivoire and as governance and democracy adviser to USAID/Ghana.

== Works ==
=== Books ===
- Political Awakening in the Belgian Congo (University of California Press, 1964)
- '"Rwanda and Burundi"' (Praeger, 1970).
- Selective Genocide in Burundi (1974)
- African Kingships in Perspective (1977)
- African Policy in Southern Africa (1978)
- Political Clientelism in Patronage and Development (1981)
- The World Bank in Rwanda (1982)
- Green and the Black: Qadhafi's Policies in Africa (1988)
- Burundi: Ethnocide as Discourse and Practice (1994),
- Burundi: Ethnic Conflict and Genocide (Woodrow Wilson Center Press/Cambridge University Press, 1996)
- The Dynamics of Violence in Central Africa (University of Pennsylvania Press, 2009)
- Remembering Genocides in Central Africa. (Routledge, 2021)

=== Articles ===
- 2018. "Rwanda: The state of research" Mass Violence and Resistance online journal.
- 2007. "Rwanda: The state of research". Online Encyclopedia of Mass Violence (4 November). pp. 1-25.
- 2006. "Consociationalism and power sharing in Africa: Rwanda, Burundi, and the Democratic Republic of the Congo". African Affairs 106, No. 422: pp. 1–20.
- 2006. "The politics of memory in post-genocide Rwanda". Occasional Papers, Center for Holocaust and Genocide Studies, University of Florida: pp. 25–54.
- 2005-2006. "The geopolitics of the Great Lakes crisis." L'Afrique des Grands Lacs. Annuaire 2005-2006.
- 2005. "Bearing witness to mass murder." African Studies Review, Vol. 48, No. 3 (December), pp. 93–101.
- 2004. Myth-Making and the Rationality of Mass Murder: Rwanda, Bosnia and Cambodia in Comparative Perspective, Leeds African Studies Bulletin, 66 (2004), 31-43.
- 2003. "Comparing the killing fields: Rwanda, Cambodia and Bosnia." In Jensen, Steven ed., Genocide: Cases, Comparisons, and Contemporary Debates. København; Sweden; The Danish Center for Holocaust and Genocide Studies.
- 2003. "Where Hamites and Aryans cross paths: the role of myth-making in mass murder", Journal of Genocide Research, vol. 5, no. 1, pp. 145–48.
- 2002. "Disconnecting the Threads: Rwanda and the Holocaust Reconsidered", Idea Journal, Vol. 7, No. 1, 29 March 2002.
- 2002. "The fire in the Great Lakes." Peace Research Abstracts 39 (2): pp. 155–306.
- 2002. "Disconnecting the threads: Rwanda and the Holocaust reconsidered." Journal of Genocide Research 4 (4): pp. 499–518.
- 2002. "Le génocide de 1972 au Burundi: Les silences de l'histoire", Cahiers d'Etudes Africaines, no. 167, XLII-3, pp. 551–567.
- 2000. "The crisis in the Great Lakes". In Harbeson & Rothchild, Africa in World Politics, Boulder, CO: Westview Press: pp. 324–352.
- 2000. "Hate crimes." Transition 9, 1/2: pp. 114–132.
- 1999. "Ethnicity as myth: The view from the Central Africa". Occasional Paper, Centre of African Studies, University of Copenhagen, May 1999.
- 1999. "Genocide in Comparative Perspective: Rwanda, Cambodia, and Bosnia", unpublished manuscript.
- 1998. "Genocide in the Great Lakes: Which genocide? Whose genocide?" New Haven, Ct.: Yale Center for International and Area Studies, Mellon Sawyer Seminar Series; pp. 1–13.
- 1997. "Eyewitness accounts; the Rwandan genocide." In Totten, Parson, and Charny, Century Of Genocide: Eyewitness Accounts And Critical Views, New York: Garland Publishing, Inc., pp. 408–423.
- 1997. "Patterns of state collapse and reconstruction in Central Africa: Reflections on the crisis in the Great Lakes Region". Afrika Spectrum, Vol. 32, No. 2: pp. 173–193; also in African Studies Quarterly online at .
- 1995. "Rwanda: the rationality of genocide". Issue: A Journal of Opinion, 23, No. 2: pp. 8–11.
- 1994. "Managing transition anarchies: Rwanda, Burundi, and South Africa in comparative perspective". The Journal of Modern African Studies 32 (4): pp. 581–604.
- 1994. "The apocalypse in Rwanda. Ethnic conflict: the new world order". Cultural Survival Quarterly 18, 2 (Summer): pp. 29–33.
- 1992. "Africa's troubled transitions". Journal of Democracy 3, No. 4 (October 1992): pp. 98–109.
- 1992. "Uncivil states and civil societies: How illusion became reality". Journal of Modern African Studies 30, No. 2: pp. 177–191.
- 1992. "African transitions to democracy: an interim (and mostly pessimistic) assessment". African Insight 22; pp. 178–85.
- 1992. "Burundi: The Politics of Ethnic Amnesia", in Helen Fein ed., Genocide Watch, New Haven: Yale University Press, pp. 70–86.
- 1991. The René Lemarchand Collection at the University of Florida: Box 1: Rwanda Documents, 1930 [bulk 1950 – 1991. 57 Folders.
- 1990. "Lécole historique burundo-française: Une école pas comme les aures". Canadian Journal of African Studies, 24 2, pp. 235–48.
- 1983. "The state and society in Africa: Ethnic stratification and restratification in historical and comparative perspective". in Donald Rothchild and Victor A. Olorunsola, eds, State Versus Ethnic Claims: African Policy Dilemmas, Boulder, Colorado (1983): pp. 44–66.
- 1980-81 "Rwanda: Recent history". In Africa South of the Sahara, 1980-81. London: Europa Publications.
- 1976. "The C.I.A. in Africa: How Central? How Intelligent?" The Journal of Modern African Studies, Volume 14, Issue 03, Sept, pp. 401–426.
- 1975. "Ethnic genocide". Excerpts from Selective Genocide in Burundi, Report No. 20, Minority Rights Group, London, 1974. Issue 5, No. 21, Summer: pp. 9–16.
- 1975. "Rwanda: Recent history". In Africa South of the Sahara, 1974. London: Europa Publications.
- 1974. "The military in former Belgian Africa". In Kelleher Ed., Political Military Systems: Comparative Perspectives. Beverly Hills: Sage Publications.
- 1973. "African Power Through the Looking Glass". The Journal of Modern African Studies, vol. 11, No. 2 (June), pp. 305–314.
- 1972. "Political clientelism and ethnicity in tropical Africa: Competing solidarities in nation-building". The American Political Science Review 66, no. 1 (March): pp. 68–90.
- 1970. "The coup in Rwanda". in Protest and Power in Black Africa, ed. Rothberg, R. I., and Mazrui, Oxford, p. 891.
- 1968. "Revolutionary phenomena in stratified societies; Rwanda and Zanzibar". Civilisations 18, No. 1: pp. 16–51.
- 1968. "Les relations de clientèle comme agent de contestation: le cas du Rwanda". Civilisations 18, No. 4: pp. 553–578.
- 1967. "The passing of Mwamiship in Burundi". Africa Report (January): pp. 15–24.
- 1966. "Power and stratification in Rwanda; A reconsideration". Cahiers d'Études africaines 6, No. 24: pp. 592–610. Also available at www.persee.fr.
- 1966. "Political instability in Africa, the case of Rwanda and Burundi." Civilisations 16 (3): pp. 307–37.
- 1962. "L'influence des systèmes traditionnels sur l'évolution du Rwanda et du Burundi." Revue de l'Institut de Sociologie de l'Université Libre de Bruxelles: pp. 2–24.

== Legacy and honors ==
- 1971, Melville J. Herskovits Award for Rwanda and Burundi, African Studies Association
- The René Lemarchand Collection of African Political Papers at the University of Florida, featuring materials on Rwanda, Burundi, Zaire, Chad, Gabon, and Libya, mostly in French, with emphasis on the period of the 1950s through independence, and increasing democratization in the 1980s and 1990s.
