= Mabanda =

- Location in Burundi
- Coordinates: 4°16′S 29°47′E
- Country: Burundi

Mabanda is a city located close to the southern tip of Burundi, near the border with Tanzania.
