= Makamba, Burundi =

Makamba Mji wa Makamba
- Location in Burundi
- Coordinates: 4°08′S 29°48′E
- Country: Burundi
- Province: Makamba Province
- Elevation: 1,472 m (4,829 ft)

Population (2012)
  - Total: 26,644

Makamba is a city located in southern Burundi. It is the capital city of Makamba Province.
