= Kirundo Airport =

Airport in Burundi

- IATA: KRE; ICAO: HBBO

Summary
- Serves: Kirundo, Burundi
- Elevation AMSL: 4,619 ft / 1,408 m
- Coordinates: 2°32′40″S 30°05′40″E

Map
- Location of airport in Burundi

Runways
| Direction | Length | | Surface |
| Direction | m | ft | Surface |
|---|---|---|---|
| 12/30 | 1,000 | 3,281 | Grass |
- Source: GCM Google Maps

Kirundo Airport (IATA: KRE, ICAO: HBBO) is an airstrip serving the city of Kirundo, Burundi. The airstrip is 4 kilometres (2.5 mi) north of Kirundo, on the north shore of Lake Rwihinda.

The Kigali VOR-DME (Ident: KNM) is located 34.7 nautical miles (64.3 km) north of Kirundo. The Kirundo non-directional beacon (Ident: DO) is located 500 metres (1,600 ft) east of the runway.

== See also ==
- Transport in Burundi
- List of airports in Burundi
