= Mutambara, Burundi =

- Location in Burundi
- Coordinates: 4°01′S 29°27′E
- Country: Burundi
- Province: Bururi Province

Mutambara is the village in Rumonge province in Burundi. Mutambara is on shores of the Lake Tanganyika. North of Mutambara is Murembwe jail, west of Mutambara is the city of Rumonge, east of Mutambara is Buruhukiro locality, south of Mutambara is Gatete locality. National Road number 3 (RN3) is from Bujumbura, Rumonge, Mutambara, Nyanza-Lac.
