= Kirundo =

- Location in Burundi
- Coordinates: 2°35′24″S 30°05′24″E
- Country: Burundi
- Province: Kirundo Province
- Elevation: 1,383 m (4,537 ft)

Population (2008)
  - Total: 10,024
- Time zone: UTC+2 (Central Africa Time)

Kirundo is a city located in northern Burundi. It is the capital city of Kirundo Province and seat of the Commune of Kirundo.

The city is served by Kirundo Airport.
