= Nyanza Lac =

Nyanza Lac, Burundi
- Location in Burundi
- Coordinates: 4°20′36″S 29°36′19″E
- Country: Burundi
- Province: Makamba Province

Nyanza-Lac

Nyanza Lac is a city in southern Burundi, in Makamba Province. The city is located on the shores of Lake Tanganyika, to the south of Mutambara and close to the border with Tanzania.

The Rwaba River flows southwest to enter Lake Tanganyika just north of Nyanza Lac. The river drains the sedimentary plain of Nyanza-Lac, which is about 16 kilometres (9.9 mi) wide and backed by high ground.

== Climate ==
Climate data for Nyanza Lac (1961–1990)
Month	Jan	Feb	Mar	Apr	May	Jun	Jul	Aug	Sep	Oct	Nov	Dec	Year
Mean daily maximum °C (°F)	28.1 (82.6)	28.5 (83.3)	28.3 (82.9)	28.6 (83.5)	29.3 (84.7)	29.3 (84.7)	29.6 (85.3)	30.1 (86.2)	31.1 (88.0)	29.3 (84.7)	28.0 (82.4)	27.6 (81.7)	29.0 (84.2)
Mean daily minimum °C (°F)	19.2 (66.6)	19.2 (66.6)	19.4 (66.9)	19.4 (66.9)	19.0 (66.2)	17.6 (63.7)	16.4 (61.5)	16.9 (62.4)	18.2 (64.8)	19.2 (66.6)	19.3 (66.7)	19.1 (66.4)	18.6 (65.4)
Average rainfall mm (inches)	159.5 (6.28)	118.8 (4.68)	160.7 (6.33)	162.6 (6.40)	103.9 (4.09)	9.4 (0.37)	3.0 (0.12)	8.5 (0.33)	18.8 (0.74)	105.1 (4.14)	181.4 (7.14)	192.1 (7.56)	1,223.8 (48.18)
Average rainy days (≥ 0.1 mm)	16	13	16	17	9	2	1	1	3	12	18	19	127
Source: World Meteorological Organization

== Sources ==
- de Cliff, Steve; Harerimana, Pierre Claver (2013), "Extraction de l'Huile Essentielle Complète des Fleurs de Cananga Odorata de la Plaine de l'Imbo: Vers la Vulgarisation d'une Nouvelle Filière de Plante Industrielle au Burundi", Revue de l’Université du Burundi -Série Sciences Exactes (in French), no. 28
- "Relation: Rwaba (17503409)", OpenStreetMap
