= Makamba Province =

Province of Burundi

Coordinates: 4°15′51″S 29°49′0″E

Makamba Province Mkoa wa Makamba
- Province
- Country: Burundi
- Capital: Makamba

Area
  - Total: 1,959.60 km^{2} (756.61 sq mi)

Population (2008 census)
  - Total: 430,899
  - Density: 219.891/km^{2} (569.516/sq mi)

Makamba was a province of Burundi. The province had a population of 430,899 (2008 census) and covers an area of 1,960 km^{2}. The provincial capital was Makamba. Makamba had six communes. In 2025, it was merged into the new province of Burunga.

== Location ==
Makamba Province was the southernmost province of Burundi. It bordered Lake Tanganyika to the west, and Tanzania to the south and east. Bururi Province and Rutana Province were to the north. The central part of Makamba Province was in the Buragane natural region. In the west, some areas were in the Imbo natural region or the Mumirwa natural region. The east of the province was in the Kumoso natural region.

== Communes ==
It was divided administratively into the following communes:

- Commune of Kayogoro
- Commune of Kibago
- Commune of Mabanda
- Commune of Makamba
- Commune of Nyanza-Lac
- Commune of Vugizo

== Sources ==
- Atlas des quatre sites Ramsar: Localisation et Resources (PDF) (in French), Ministry of Water, Environment and Urbanism, October 2014
