= List of ambassadors of Burundi to Belgium =

Coordinates: 50.847594°N 4.379728°E

Ambassador of Burundi to Belgium
- Umuserukizi w'Uburundi mu bwami bw'Ububiligi
- Coat of arms of Burundi

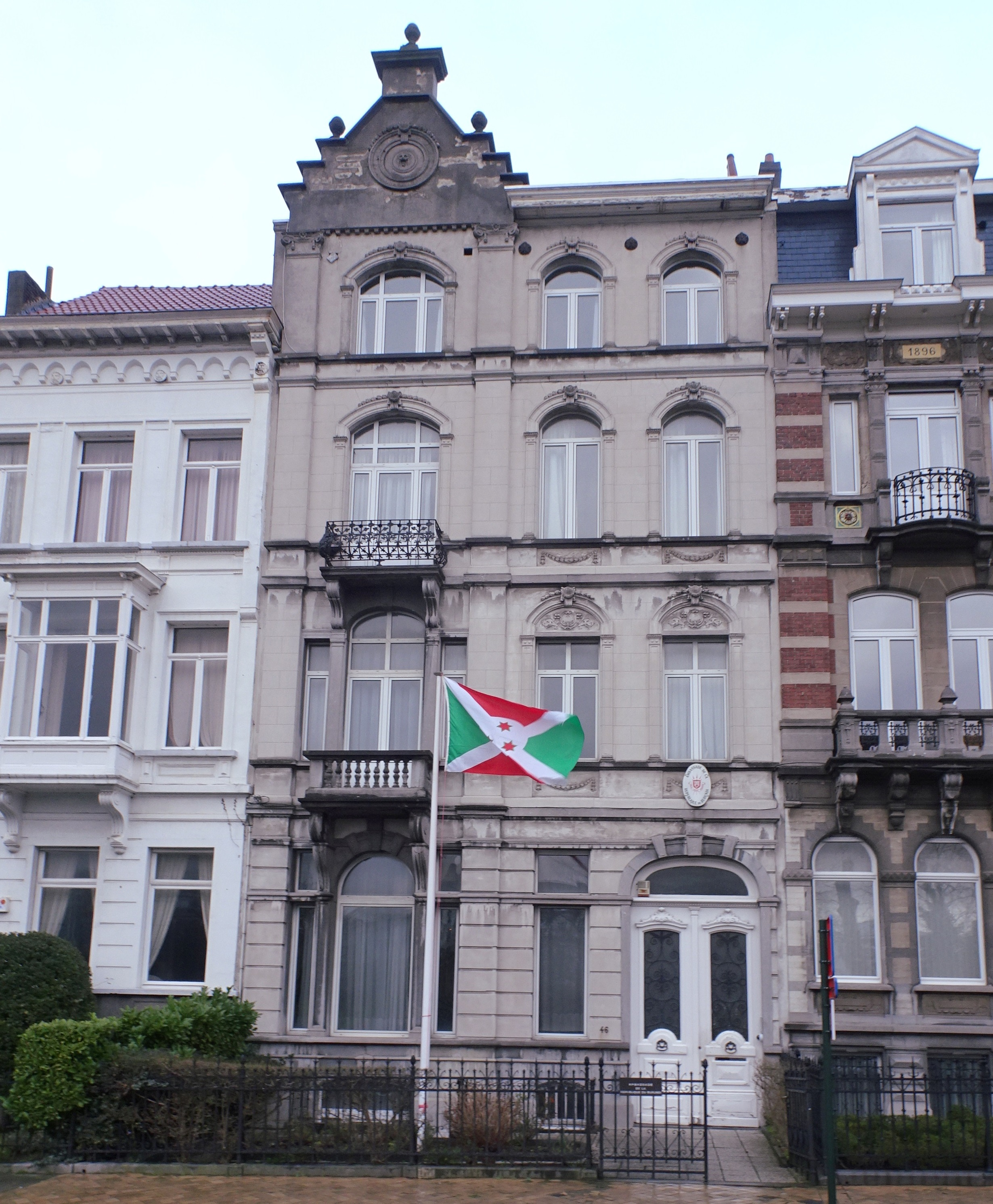
- Incumbent; Thérence Ntahiraja since November 14, 2019
- Style: His/Her Excellency
- Residence: Square Mairie-Louise 46 1000, Brussels (Embassy offices)
- Appointer: Évariste Ndayishimiye
- Inaugural holder: Charles Baranyanka
- Formation: 1962
- Website: https://ambabubruxelles.mae.gov.bi/

The Burundian Ambassador to Belgium is the official representative of the Government of Burundi to the Government of Belgium.

- The Ambassador, with residence in City of Brussels, is concurrently accredited to the European Commission, the Organisation of African, Caribbean and Pacific States and Luxembourg.

== History ==
- from 1916 to 1922 the territory of Ruanda-Urundi was under Belgian military occupation
- from 1922 to 1945 the territory of Ruanda-Urundi was a Belgian-controlled Class B Mandate under the League of Nations.

== List of representatives ==
Diplomatic accreditation	ambassador	Observations	Head of State of Burundi	President of the European Commission	Term end
1962	Charles Baranyanka		Mwambutsa IV Bangiriceng of Burundi	Walter Hallstein	July 1966
February 5, 1965	Louis Barusasiyeko		Mwambutsa IV Bangiriceng of Burundi	Walter Hallstein	July 1966
September 16, 1969	Laurent Nzeyimana		Michel Micombero	Jean Rey (politician)	November 1976
September 20, 1977	Jérôme Ntungumburanye		Jean-Baptiste Bagaza	Roy Jenkins	September 1987
December 16, 1980	Cyprien Mbonimpa		Jean-Baptiste Bagaza	Roy Jenkins	September 1987
April 4, 1986	Egide Nkuryingoma		Jean-Baptiste Bagaza	Jacques Delors	September 1987
May 24, 1988	Astere Nzisabira		Pierre Buyoya	Jacques Delors	April 2003
March 15, 1990	Julien Nahayo		Pierre Buyoya	Jacques Delors	April 2003
June 29, 1992	Balthazar Habonimana		Pierre Buyoya	Jacques Delors	April 2003
June 8, 1999	Jonathas Niyungeko		Pierre Buyoya	Jacques Santer	April 2003
March 24, 2003	Ferdinand Nyabenda		Domitien Ndayizeye	Romano Prodi	August 25, 2005
January 18, 2007	Laurent Kavakure		Pierre Nkurunziza	José Manuel Barroso	June 20, 2020
October 28, 2011	Balthazar Bigirimana		Pierre Nkurunziza	José Manuel Barroso	June 20, 2020
May 31, 2013	Félix Ndayisenga		Pierre Nkurunziza	José Manuel Barroso	June 20, 2020
September 16, 2015	Jérémie Banigwaninzigo		Pierre Nkurunziza	José Manuel Barroso	2019
November 14, 2019	Thérence Ntahiraja		Pierre Nkurunziza	Jean-Claude Juncker	
