= Supreme Court of Burundi =

Highest civil and criminal court of Burundi

- Sentare ntahinyuzwa (Kirundi); Cour Suprême du Burundi (French)
- Coat of arms of Burundi
- Established: As a Court of Cassation1962; 64 years ago; As Supreme Court February 25, 2005; 21 years ago
- Jurisdiction: Burundi
- Location: Bujumbura, Burundi
- Composition method: Appointed by President on the proposal of the Minister of Justice, on the advice of the High Council of the Judiciary and after approval by the Senate.
- Authorised by: Constitution of Burundi Title VIII Chapter III
- Judge term length: Five years, non renewable
- Number of positions: 15

President
- Currently: Amb. Gamaliel Nkurunziza
- Since: November 19, 2024; 2 years ago

The Supreme Court (French: Cour Suprême) is the highest civil and criminal court in Burundi. It has nine members, including the Court President, who are nominated by the Judicial Service Commission and appointed by the President of the Republic after the approval of the Senate. The court's president is referred to as the Chief Justice.

The composition of the Supreme Court was established as a Court of Cassation with the independence of Burundi in 1962. Its current form is regulated by the Law of 25 February 2005. It is composed of three chambers which are known collectively as the United Chambers (chambres réunies):

- Judicial Chamber (chambre judiciaire);
- Administrative Chamber (chambre administrative);
- Chamber of Cassation (chambre de cassation).

The Judicial Chamber is sub-divided into two sections: a Section of First Instance (section du premier degré) and an Appellate Section (section d'appel). Attached is the National Department of Public Prosecutions.

The Supreme Court may sit together with the Constitutional Court constituting the High Court of Justice which has special powers, such as the ability to try an incumbent president or government ministers for treason.

== History ==
Article 94 of the 1962 constitution of the Kingdom of Burundi provided for a Supreme Court. The constitution gave the court sole competence over criminal cases against government ministers and members of the Parliament, as well as questions of constitutionality of laws and disputes between different branches of government. The court was given competence to retry decisions made by the judiciary before independence. An Accounts Court was brought into service as a special chamber of the Supreme Court in May 1975 to try cases of government corruption.

== List of chief justices ==
This list of all chief justices:

Name	Took office	Left office	Notes
André Masunzu	1963	1963	
Alois Malorerwa	1964	1964	
Joseph Bukera	1967	1974	
Gaétan Rugambara	1974	1976	
Vincent Ndikumasabo	1977	1977	
Pasteur Nzinahora	1978	1987	[Juvénal Njinyari listed as President in 1981 docket]
Gérard Buyoya	1988	1989	
Thérence Sinunguruza	1990	1990	
Marc Birihanyuma	1991	1993	
Diomède Nahayo	1993	1995	
Fidèle Havyarimana	1995	1995	
Timothée Bisumbagutira	1995	1995	
Juvénal Njinyari	1995	1995	
Salvator Seromba	1995	1998	[Adrien Nyankiye listed as President in 1996 docket]
Ladislas Ndayisenga	1998	1998	
Timothée Bisumbagutira	1999	1999	
Adrien Nyankiye	2000	2005	
Ancilla Ntakaburimvo	2006	2011	
Jean-Marie Ngendanzi	2011	2011	
Emmanuel Jenje	2012	2014	
Sylvestre Mpawenayo	2015	2016	
François Nkezabahizi	2016	2019	
Emmanuel Gateretse	28 Octobre 2019	18 November 2024	
Amb. Gamaliel Nkurunziza	19 November 2024	Present	

== See also ==
- Judiciary of Burundi
- Constitutional Court of Burundi

== Works cited ==
- Lemarchand, René (1970). Rwanda and Burundi. New York: Praeger Publishers. OCLC 254366212.
- McDonald, Gordon C., ed. (1969). Area Handbook for Burundi (PDF). Washington, D.C.: U.S. Government Printing Office. OCLC 953395348. Archived (PDF) from the original on July 27, 2021.
- Weinstein, Warren (1976). Historical Dictionary of Burundi. Metuchen: Scarecrow Press. ISBN 978-0-8108-0962-8.
