= Philippe Minani =

Burundian politician

Minister of Justice of Burundi
- In office 1975–1976
- President: Michel Micombero

Personal details
- Born: Burundi
- Party: Union for National Progress

Philippe Minani was a Burundian politician. He was the former Minister of Justice of Burundi from 1975 to 1976. He was succeeded by Jean-Baptiste Manwangari, who also was succeeded by Laurent Nzeyimana (1979–1982).

Preceded by Albert Shibura	Minister of Justice of Burundi; 1975–1976	Succeeded by Jean-Baptiste Manwangari
