= List of ambassadors of Burundi to France =

Coordinates: 48.878365°N 2.400326°E

Ambassador of Burundi to France
- Umuserukizi w'Uburundi mu Bufaransa
- Coat of arms of Burundi

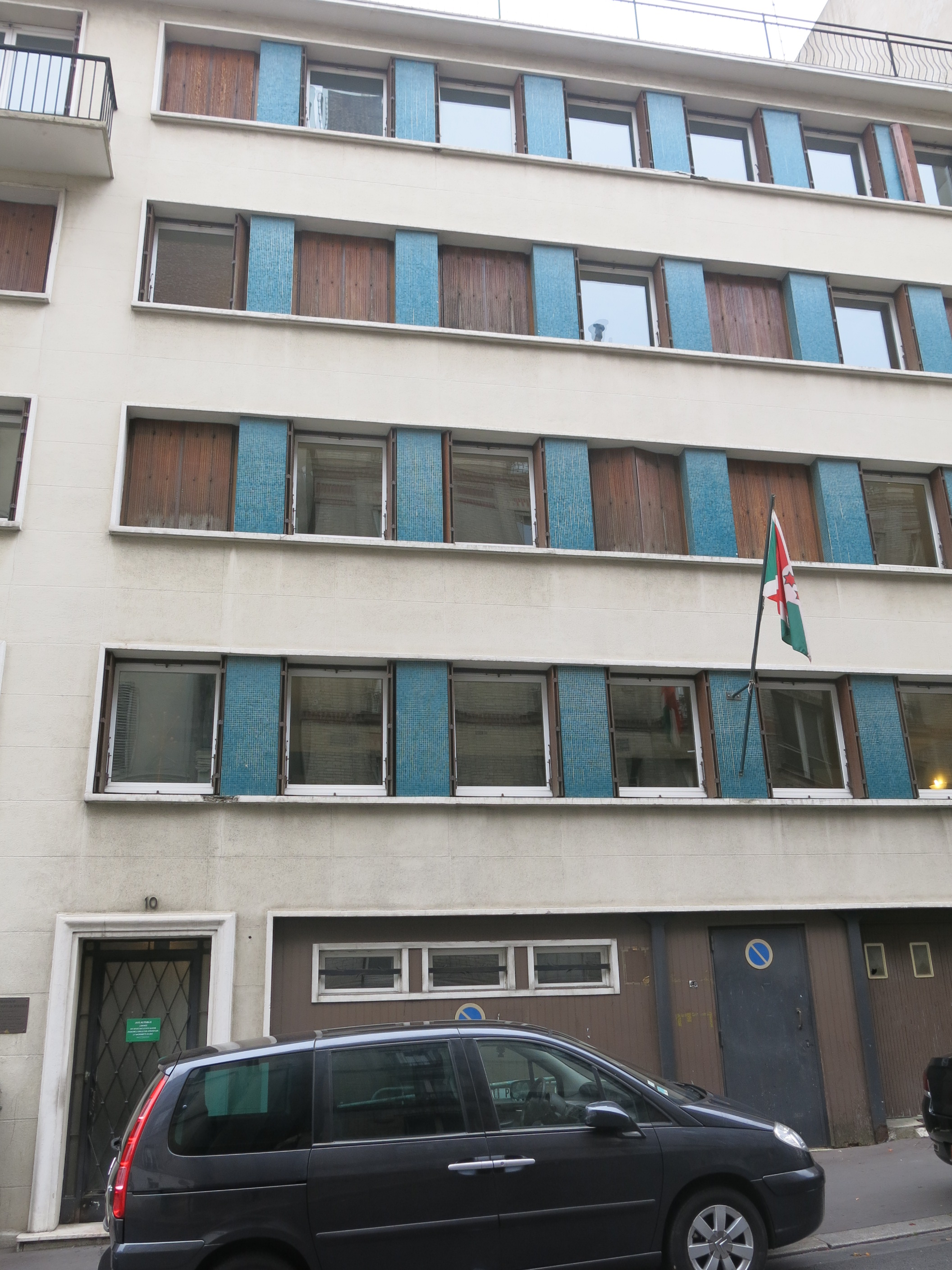
- Incumbent; Spès Caritas Njebarikanuye since March 16, 2026
- Style: His/Her Excellency
- Residence: 10-12, rue de l'Orme 75019 Paris
- Appointer: Évariste Ndayishimiye
- Inaugural holder: Louis Barusasiyeko
- Formation: November 24, 1964
- Website: https://www.ambabuparis.mae.gov.bi/

The Burundian Ambassador to France is the official representative of the Government of Burundi to the Government of France. The Ambassador with residence in Paris is concurently accredited to Monaco, to Lisbon, to Madrid, to UNESCO and the Organisation of Francophonie.

== List of representatives ==
Below is a list of all officeholder of the title of ambassador of Burundi to France:

Diplomatic accreditation	Ambassador	Observations	List of heads of state of Burundi	List of presidents of France	Term end
November 24, 1964	Louis Barusasiyeko		Mwambutsa IV	Charles de Gaulle	
March 24, 1965	Charles Baranyanka	Resident in Brussels	Mwambutsa IV	Charles de Gaulle	
1966	Arcade Bankamwabo	Encargado de negocios	Michel Micombero	Charles de Gaulle	
1967	Joseph Nindorera		Michel Micombero	Charles de Gaulle	1972
March 10, 1977	Gérard Wakarerwa		Jean-Baptiste Bagaza	Valéry Giscard d’Estaing	July 27, 1981
March 3, 1984	Cyprien Mbonimpa	(*December 26, 1946 in the Commune Vyanda, Province Bururi)	Jean-Baptiste Bagaza	François Mitterrand	1986
January 13, 1988	Pasteur Nzinahora		Pierre Buyoya	François Mitterrand	
1993	Edonias Niyongabo		François Ngeze	François Mitterrand	1994
March 30, 1995	Fulgence Dwima Bakana		Sylvestre Ntibantunganya	François Mitterrand	1995
July 25, 1997	Jean Baptiste Mbonyingingo		Pierre Buyoya	Jacques Chirac	1997
October 29, 1998	Vénérand Bakevyumusaya		Pierre Buyoya	Jacques Chirac	2001
October 11, 2002	Liboire Ngendahayo		Pierre Buyoya	Jacques Chirac	2005
October 18, 2006	Ildephonse Nkeramihigo		Pierre Nkurunziza	Jacques Chirac	2008
September 17, 2008	Claude Nimubona-Gatogato		Pierre Nkurunziza	Nicolas Sarkozy	2010
June 8, 2011	Gaspard Musavyarabona		Pierre Nkurunziza	Nicolas Sarkozy	2013
July 12, 2013	Dieudonné Ndabarushimana		Pierre Nkurunziza	François Hollande	January 17, 2016
January 17, 2016	Aloys David Mugemancuro	Chargé d'affaires	Pierre Nkurunziza	François Hollande	July 31, 2017
July 31, 2017	Christine-Nina Niyonsavye		Pierre Nkurunziza	Emmanuel Macron	March 9, 2019
September 10, 2019	Ernest Niyokindi		Pierre Nkurunziza	Emmanuel Macron	August 31, 2022
September 22, 2023	Isaïe Kubwayo		Évariste Ndayishimiye	Emmanuel Macron	July 20, 2025
March 16, 2026	Spès Caritas Njebarikanuye		Évariste Ndayishimiye	Emmanuel Macron	
