= Sébastian Ntahuga =

Burundian politician

Minister of Justice of Burundi
- In office 1992–1993
- President: Pierre Buyoya

Personal details
- Born: Burundi
- Party: Union for National Progress

Sébastian Ntahuga is a Burundian politician and diplomat. He was the former Minister of Justice of Burundi from 1992 to 1993. He was succeeded by Fulgence Dwima-Bakana, who was also succeeded by Melchior Ntahobama (1994–1995).

Ntahuga worked as a supervisor for Arusha Peace Accord in the early 2000s. He holds a master's degree in International Organizations Law obtained from Pantheon Sorbonne in Paris, France. In Burundi, he served as a Magistrate at courts and tribunals, as well as the Diplomatic Adviser to the President of the Republic of Burundi. He also worked as the Ambassador of Burundi in Germany standing for the Holy See and Scandinavian countries. He has worked for the African Union and Regional Economic Communities (REC) in ensuring peace and security in African countries. Besides being a judge and a minister, he was also a trainer of African Union field diplomats, as well as an electoral observer.In South Sudan, he was part of South Sudan's Official Negotiators.

Preceded by Evariste Niyonkuro	Minister of Justice of Burundi; 1992–1993	Succeeded by Jean-Baptiste Manwangari
