= Melchior Ntahobama =

Burundian politician

Minister of Justice of Burundi
- In office 1994–1995
- President: Jean-Baptiste Bagaza

Personal details
- Born: Burundi
- Party: Union for National Progress

Melchior Ntahobama was a Burundian politician. He was the former Minister of Justice of Burundi from 1994 to 1995. He was succeeded by Gerard Ngendaganya, who was also succeeded by Gervais Rubashamuheto in 1997.

Preceded by Fulgence Dwima-Bakana	Minister of Justice of Burundi; 1994–1995	Succeeded by Gerard Ngendaganya
