= Vincent Ndikumasabo =

Burundian politician

Minister of Justice of Burundi
- In office 1983–1986
- President: Michel Micombero

Personal details
- Born: Burundi
- Party: Union for National Progress

Vincent Ndikumasabo was a Burundian politician, activist and educator. He was the former Minister of Justice of Burundi from 1975 to 1976. He was succeeded by Aloys Ndenzako, who also was succeeded by Evariste Niyonkuro (1988–1991).

Preceded by Laurent Nzeyimana	Minister of Justice of Burundi; 1983–1986	Succeeded by Aloys Ndenzako
