= Constitution of the Kingdom of Burundi =

Definitive Constitution of the Kingdom of Burundi (French: Constitution Définitive du Royaume du Burundi; Kirundi: Ishimikiro ry'Ingoma y'i Burundi)
- Coat of arms of the Kingdom of Burundi

Overview
- Jurisdiction: Kingdom of Burundi
- Date effective: 16 October 1962
- System: Constitutional monarchy
- Chambers: Bicameral
- Executive: Mwami
- Repealed: 8 July 1966
- Signatories: Mwambutsa IV, André Muhirwa, Claver Nuwinkware

The Definitive Constitution of the Kingdom of Burundi (French: Constitution Définitive du Royaume du Burundi; Kirundi: Ishimikiro ry'Ingoma y'i Burundi), sometimes called the "independence constitution", was the constitution of the independent Kingdom of Burundi from its promulgation in 1962 until its suspension in 1966.

== Background ==
From 1919 to 1962 Burundi was governed as a mandatory territory by Belgium as part of Ruanda-Urundi. The Belgian administration exercised authority on the basis of decrees, regulations, and by-laws, but never produced a formal constitution. A provisional constitution was promulgated in November 1961. It was repealed on 30 June 1962, the day before independence.

Following adoption by the National Assembly, the constitution was promulgated on 16 October 1962 with retroactive application to 1 July. The promulgation order was signed by Mwami Mwambutsa IV, Prime Minister André Muhirwa, and Minister of Justice Claver Nuwinkware.

== Framework and provisions ==
=== Overview ===
The constitution was largely based on the Belgian and French legal systems, both derived from the Napoleonic Code. Some provisions were taken verbatim from the Belgian constitution of 1832. It was written in French with an official translation offered in Kirundi. It consisted of 123 articles. It established Burundi as a constitutional monarchy with eight provinces: Bubanza, Bukirasazi, Bururi, Gitega, Muramvya, Muyinga, Ngozi, and Ruyigi. Article 21 declared French and Kirundi as the country's official languages. Article 23 declared that all governmental power was derived from "the Nation". Article 113 declared "God, King, and Burundi" to be the national motto and article 114 designated Bujumbura as the capital. Article 18 stipulated that the constitution could not be suspended.

=== Bill of rights ===
Articles 4–22 served as a bill of rights, enumerating the basic civil, political, and economic rights of Burundians. Article 6 declared that the legal system made no racial distinctions and gave Burundians equality before the law. Article 13 ensured the freedom of religion. Article 17 guaranteed the freedom of the press. Article 19 granted Burundians the right to petition the government. Article 20 guaranteed the "secrecy" of letters. The freedoms of association and assembly were also recognised. The freedoms of the press, secret correspondence, and association were subject to exceptions to be determined by law.

=== Legislature ===
Articles 23–50 established the Parliament of Burundi as a bicameral entity with a National Assembly and a Senate and laid out their powers. Article 24 stated that legislative authority was shared by the Mwami and Parliament, and article 5 assured that "authoritative interpretation of the laws" rested with them. Article 44 stipulated that the deputies of the National Assembly were to be directly elected by male and female citizens. Article 50 provided for the creation of the Senate but did not require its existence, reading, "the Senate may be created on the initiative of the legislative power [Mwami and National Assembly]". The Senate was empowered to review legislation but not propose bills on its own accord. Parliament was given responsibility for creating a national budget. Article 105 requested that the National Assembly appoint an Accounts Court to oversee national expenditures. Article 122 listed additional parliamentary powers and requested that the legislature create regulations concerning 11 subjects, including the press, finances, the organisation of the judiciary, administrative organisation of provinces and communes, organisation of the armed forces, and the responsibilities of ministers. Parliament was empowered to demand the presence of government ministers at its proceedings and could initiate public inquiries. Members of Parliament enjoyed parliamentary immunity and could only be prosecuted if stripped of immunity by the chamber of which they were a member or in instances where they had committed a conspicuous offense.

=== Powers of the monarchy and government ===
Articles 51–82 established the powers of the Mwami and his ministers. The Mwami was declared a constitutional king. Article 27 vested him with executive authority. Monarchical orders had to be countersigned by a minister with competence in the relevant subject in order to be legal. The Mwami was not responsible to Parliament, while his ministers were responsible. Ministers appointed from the members of Parliament were allowed to retain their seats and participate in debates. The Mwami was empowered to appoint and revoke his ministers and had more general appointment powers concerning government administration, diplomats, and some judicial offices subject to limits imposed by laws. He could also select a formateur. He also had the power to veto parliamentary legislation and dissolve Parliament. He enjoyed sovereign immunity from criminal prosecution. Article 77 established a six-member Crown Council to advise the Mwami, three of whom were to be appointed by the National Assembly. The position of the Mwami was to be assumed by hereditary succession to a male of 17 years of age, though in cases where there was no heir apparent the Mwami was to be designated by Parliament and the Crown Council. In instances when the heir was not of age, Parliament and the Crown Council would select a regent. Any new Mwami or regent would swear an oath to the constitution before assuming their powers. A regent would also be selected in case the Mwami was incapacitated. No regent could accept amendments to the constitution during his tenure. During brief vacancies of the crown, the powers of the monarchy were to be exercised by the council of ministers.

=== Judiciary ===
Articles 83–97 established the judiciary and largely modeled it after the Belgian system. Article 94 provided for Tribunals/Courts of Residence, Courts of Province, Courts of First Instance, an Appeals Court, and a Supreme Court. Judges were to be appointed by the Mwami at the suggestion of his Minister of Justice and held their offices for life unless dismissed by the Mwami on the Minister of Justice's recommendation. Criminal trial by a board of jurors was stipulated in instances where the accused was facing capital punishment or life imprisonment. The Supreme Court had the sole competence to try cases involving breaches of the law by ministers, deputies, and senators. It also had the sole authority to try cases involving disputes between different branches of government and the constitutionality of laws. Ministers found guilty of a crime committed in the course of their official responsibilities could not be pardoned by the Mwami.

=== Provinces and local institutions ===
Articles 98–106 detailed the role of provincial and communal governments.

=== Armed forces ===
Articles 107–112 handled the creation of the armed forces. This was to include three branches: an army, a gendarmerie, and a civil guard. Foreigners were prohibited from serving in the forces. The Mwami was declared commander-in-chief and empowered to confer ranks upon the forces' members.

=== Amendment process ===
Article 119 detailed the process for amending the constitution. The Mwami and Parliament were to declare that a specific amendment was being considered. Following this, Parliament was to be dissolved and a special election held within 40 days. Within two months following this Parliament was to reconvene to debate the amendment. In order to be ratified, the amendment had to secure the approval of two-thirds of those voting in each chamber of Parliament as well as the agreement of the Mwami and the Crown Council.

== Historical application and suspension ==
The constitution's provisions for freedom of assembly and association allowed for the continued development of a multi-party system. In accordance with the constitution, many government orders, especially those printed in the Bulletin Officiel du Burundi from 1962 to 1963, were written in both French and Kirundi.

On 1 June 1963, Prime Minister Muhirwa announced his appointment of a new Minister of Public Works. This prompted the Mwami to deny the selection, arguing that the crown was entitled to choose its ministers. Faced with growing parliamentary opposition and the monarchy's interventions, Muhirwa gave Mwambutsa his resignation that on 7 June. The Mwami appointed Pierre Ngendandumwe as the new Prime Minister on 18 June. From this point onward the government became increasingly subject to the maneuverings of the monarchy, and de facto lost its responsibility to Parliament. Parliament retained its legislative responsibilities but the initiative for creating laws increasingly fell to the Mwami. Some deputies in the National Assembly defended the Mwami's involvement in politics, citing article 57's empowerment of the monarch to choose his ministers. On 15 February 1964, the Assembly bureau penned a letter of protest to the Mwami, accusing him of violating article 61 of the constitution. They followed with another letter on 12 March, accusing him of violating the separation of powers.

The Senate was first constituted after the county's 1965 elections. By mid-1965 the Mwami had exercised all of his constitutional powers. On September 2 the Mwami issued an arrêté-loi that reduced the number of communes in the country from 181 to 78 and made all burgomasters appointed functionaries responsible to the crown and the government instead of locally elected officials. Hutu politicians were infuriated by the Mwami's bypassing of the parliamentary government in issuing the decree and by removing their potential to consolidate their strength in communal elections. On 28 September a group of Hutu members of Parliament—including the officers of both the Assembly and the Senate—signed a letter denouncing the move as unconstitutional and declared that they "absolutely refused to accept the provisions of the arrêté-loi". The Mwami also appointed his own government, and his continued contraventions of the constitution infuriated Hutu parliamentarians. On October 18, a group of Hutu soldiers in the army and gendarmerie launched a coup attempt. The coup failed, but Mwambutsa fled to Europe.

Faced with the difficulties of trying govern from abroad and being increasingly attracted to a comfortable life in Europe, on 24 March 1966 Mwambutsa issued a decree giving Crown Prince Charles Ndizeye "special powers to co-ordinate and control the activities of the government and the secretariats of state". The Mwami did not specify whether he was de facto abdicating the throne. In the mean time, young army officers, junior civil servants, and cadres from radical youth organisations—all mostly Tutsi—became increasingly aware of the influence which they had gained in government. The army group, led by Captain Michel Micombero, was predominant in this informal coalition. Tutsi intellectuals and radicals—especially Gilles Bimazubute—began calling for the removal of the Biha government and the dissolution of the monarchy.

On 8 July 1966 Ndizeye, supported by the radicals, led a coup. He declared himself the new head of state and suspended the constitution. He dismissed the Biha government and appointed a new one led by Micombero as prime minister. Despite the suspension of the constitution, the new government left the existing constitutional framework of the state mostly intact. On 1 September Ndizeye was formally crowned as Mwami Ntare IV. Soon thereafter conflict arose between Ntare, who wished to actively rule, and the new government and its supporters, eager to implement progressive reforms without interference from the crown. On 28 November, while Ntare was abroad, the army launched a coup. The army proclaimed the transformation of Burundi into a republic under the leadership of a National Revolutionary Council and Micombero as the new President of Burundi.

== Aftermath ==
Following the constitution's suspension in 1966, Burundi faced years of legal uncertainty. In the absence of a formal legal framework, Micombero ruled by executive decree, though he still abided by the constitution's guidelines for budgeting and finance. The Accounts Court authorized by the constitution was not founded until 1967 to keep corruption in check. French and Kirundi remained de facto official languages, though usage of Kirundi in government documents declined. The judicial system also remained largely based on the 1962 constitutional framework. A commission to draft a new constitution was established in 1967. The issue went largely unattended over the following years, though Micombero occasionally alluded to constitutional projects. In May 1974 he appointed another commission to create a constitution. The commission created a new document which was promulgated that July. It affirmed the republican style of government in place since the 1966 coup and placed all governing power in the office of the president.

== See also ==
- Constitution of Burundi

== Works cited ==
- Banshimiyubusa, Denis (2018). Les enjeux et défis de la démocratisation au Burundi. Essai d'analyse et d'interprétation à partir des partis politiques (PDF) (PhD thesis) (in French). Université Pau et des Pays de l'Adour. OCLC 1085890695.
- Bigirimana, Jean-Baptiste (2009). "Translation as a Dynamic Model in the Development of the Burundi Constitution(s)". Translation Issues in Language and Law. Springer. ISBN 9780230233744.
- Lemarchand, René (1970). Rwanda and Burundi. New York: Praeger Publishers. OCLC 254366212.
- McDonald, Gordon C., ed. (1969). Area Handbook for Burundi (PDF). Washington, D.C.: U.S. Government Printing Office. OCLC 953395348. Archived (PDF) from the original on July 27, 2021.
- Russell, Aidan (2019). Politics and Violence in Burundi: The Language of Truth in an Emerging State. Cambridge University Press. ISBN 978-1-108-49934-7.
- Vanderlinden, Jacques (1975). "Deux constitutions africaines récentes et novatrices: celles du Burundi et du Zaïre" (PDF). Bulletins des Séances (in French). 21 (2): 113–134.
- Verdoodt, A. (2011). "Social and Linguistic Structures of Burundi, a Typical 'Unimodal' Country". Language and Society: Anthropological Issues (reprint ed.). Walter de Gruyter. ISBN 9783110806489.
- Webster, John. B. (1964), The Constitutions of Burundi, Malagasy and Rwanda. A Comparison and Explanation of East African French Language Constitutions, Occasional Paper no. 3, Syracuse: Syracuse University, OCLC 846680671
- Weinstein, Warren (1976). Historical Dictionary of Burundi. Metuchen: Scarecrow Press. ISBN 978-0-8108-0962-8.
