= Balthazar Bigirimana =

Burundian politician

Burundian Minister of Public Works & Equipment
- In office 1992–1992

President of Rally for the People of Burundi
- In office 1995 – October 28, 2011
- Preceded by: Ernest Kabushemeye

Burundian Ambassador to Belgium of Burundi to Belgium
- In office October 28, 2011 – December 13, 2012
- Preceded by: Laurent Kavakure
- Succeeded by: Félix Ndayisenga

Personal details
- Born: 1957 Kirundo Province, Burundi
- Died: December 13, 2012 (aged 55) Brussels, Belgium

Balthazar Bigirimana was a Burundian politician and diplomat. From 1995 to his death, he has been president of the Rally for the People of Burundi (RPB). Bigirimana was an ethnic Hutu from Kirundo province. From October 28, 2011 to December 13, 2012 he was Burundian Ambassador to Belgium.
