= Ancilla Ntakaburimvo =

Burundian Supreme Court Justice

Marie Ancilla Ntakaburimvo is a Burundian lawyer who was the president of the Supreme Court of Burundi. She was appointed to the position by President Pierre Nkurunziza on the recommendation of Minister of Justice and Keeper of the Seals on 4 March 2006 succeeding Adrien Nyankiye in that office. She served in this position until August 2010, when she was appointed Minister of Justice and Keeper of the Seals. President Nkurunziza sacked her from her ministerial post along with five other cabinet members for poor performance in November 2011.
