= Inamujandi =

Inamujandi (died c. 1935) was a Burundian spiritual leader and anticolonial activist.

== Early life ==
Inamujandi was born in the mid-nineteenth century in a remote region near Ndora Mountain in 1872/1890, northeast Burundi, in the modern province of Cibitoke. Her early life is otherwise obscure, but she belonged to a long tradition of female prophets associated with the shrines of deceased Burundian kings.

== Involvement in 1934 revolt ==
Inamujandi played an important role in fomenting the 1934 rebellion against Belgian colonial rule in Burundi. The colonial authorities had replaced the young king Mutaga Mbikije with Pierre Baranyanka, an action Inamujandi was strongly opposed to, particularly as Baranyanka was a Tutsi in a predominantly Hutu area. Under her instigation and inspiration by her invocation of the demi-God Kiranga, the population of Ndora revolted in an attempt to restore the pre-colonial order.

Such was Inamujandi's ability to motivate her people that she was rumoured to have magical powers. A Belgian government report described her as "a sorceress by the name of Mujande. She announced the coming of a new king," while eyewitnesses said that she claimed that anyone "who called himself Tutsi or mzungu (European) would be spat upon by the new king and would perish." She reportedly told her followers that the bullets of colonial forces would turn into grain or water, and that the trees themselves would eat their enemies.

The rebels under her guidance set fire to more than three hundred huts and ten mission schools within a matter of days. However, the revolt was soon crushed by Force Publique troops.

She was captured in on 6 November 1934, and was sent into exile Ruyigi in the east of the country, where she was sentenced to 10 to 12yrs followed by house arrest. Later she escaped and disappeared in 1949

== Legacy ==
Inamujandi's name was frequently invoked by Hutu partisans in the 1950s and 60s, and successive Burundian governments have presented her as an anti-colonial role model.
