= Claver Nuwinkware =

Burundian politician

Pierre-Claver Nuwinkware (Kirundi: Petro Claveri Nuwinkware; died 1972) was a Burundian politician.

== Early life ==
Pierre-Claver Nuwinkware was ethnically Hutu. He was educated in Catholic schools.

== Political career ==
Nuwinkware was a member of the Union for National Progress (Union pour le Progrès national). In September 1961 Louis Rwagasore became Prime Minister of Burundi and formed a government with Nuwinkware as Minister of Justice. Following Rwagasore's assassination, André Muhirwa became prime minister. Politically, Muhirwa worked to prevent Hutus from gaining influence in government. Nevertheless, Nuwinkware remained a loyal member of his cabinet. He signed the promulgation order of the 1962 Constitution of the Kingdom of Burundi along with Mwami Mwambutsa IV and Muhirwa. Mwambutsa attempted to intervene in national politics to temper ethnic and political divides, but Nuwinkware resisted this, garnering the Mwami's ire.

In late February 1963, Hutu political leader Paul Mirerekano was arrested, but Nuwinkware ordered him released on 1 March. The Ministry of Justice also published a pamphlet in tribute to Rwagasore which he reportedly authored. Muhirwa's government collapsed later that year and in June Pierre Ngendandumwe formed a government with Nuwikware as Minister of Social Affairs. Ngendandumwe was dismissed in June 1964 and replaced by Albin Nyamoya, who retained Nuwinkware in the same portfolio. In January 1965, Ngendandumwe formed a new government with Nuwinkware as Minister of Justice, but was shortly thereafter killed. His successor, Joseph Bamina, retained Nuwinkware in the office.

In 1965, Nuwinkware was co-opted into the Senate. Following a failed coup attempt by Hutu soldiers later that year, he was arrested by the government.

== Later life ==
Nuwinkware was released from prison in April 1966, but briefly detained again in August. He then found employment at the Official University of Bujumbura, working as its administrative director. During the Ikiza in May 1972, he was arrested by the government for alleged subversion and subsequently executed.

== Works cited ==
- Chrétien, Jean-Pierre; Dupaquier, Jean-François (2007). Burundi 1972, au bord des génocides (in French). Paris: Karthala Editions. ISBN 9782845868724.
- Hirsch, Bertrand; Kropp, Manfred, eds. (2003). Heilige, Biographien und Geschichte in Afrika (in English, French, and German). Peter Lang. ISBN 9783631364987.
- Webster, John. B. (1964), The Constitutions of Burundi, Malagasy and Rwanda. A Comparison and Explanation of East African French Language Constitutions, Occasional Paper no. 3, Syracuse: Syracuse University, OCLC 846680671
- Weinstein, Warren (1976). Historical Dictionary of Burundi. Metuchen: Scarecrow Press. ISBN 978-0-8108-0962-8.
