= Pierre Ngunzu =

Burundian politician

Minister of Justice of Burundi
- In office 1964–1965
- President: Michel Micombero

Personal details
- Born: Burundi
- Party: Union for National Progress

Pierre Ngunzu was a Burundian politician. He was the former Minister of Justice of Burundi from 1961 to 1964. He was succeeded by Artémon Simbananiye, who also was succeeded by Albert Shibura (1973–1975).

Preceded by Claver Nuwinkware	Minister of Justice of Burundi; 1964–1965	Succeeded by Artémon Simbananiye
