= Clotilde Niragira =

Burundian politician and lawyer (1968–2021)

Minister of Justice and Keeper of the Government Seals
- In office 2005–2007
- President: Pierre Nkurunziza
- Preceded by: Didace Kiganahe
- Succeeded by: Jean Bosco Ndikumana

Minister of Civil Service, Labour and Social Security
- In office 2007–2009
- President: Pierre Nkurunziza

Head of Civil Cabinet/President's Deputy Chief of Staff
- In office 2009–2011
- President: Pierre Nkurunziza

Minister of National Solidarity, Human Rights and Gender
- In office 2011–2015/2016
- President: Pierre Nkurunziza

Secretary-General of the Truth and Reconciliation Commission
- In office 2015/2016–2018
- President: Pierre Nkurunziza

Personal details
- Born: 1968 Commune of Bugenyuzi, Burundi
- Died: 19 February 2021 (aged 52–53) Nairobi, Kenya

Clotilde Niragira (1968 – 19 February 2021) was a Burundian politician and lawyer. She served as head of three separate ministries in Pierre Nkurunziza's government and was Secretary-General of Burundi's Truth and Reconciliation Commission.

== Early career ==
Clotilde Niragira was born in the Commune of Bugenyuzi in Karuzi Province, Burundi, in 1968. She was married with three children and was a lawyer before entering politics. In 2005 she was appointed Minister of Justice and Keeper of the Government Seals in the country's Council of Ministers by President Pierre Nkurunziza. In 2006 Niragira authorised the release of 3,300 prisoners. She was appointed Minister of Civil Service, Labour and Social Security by Nkurunziza in a cabinet reshuffle on 14 November 2007. Niragira was almost immediately faced with a strike by civil servants demanding a 34% pay rise. In 2009 she was appointed Head of the Civil Cabinet and was later Nkurunziza's Deputy Chief of Staff.

== Minister of National Solidarity ==
Niragira was appointed Minister of National Solidarity, Human Rights and Gender by Nkurunziza on 7 November 2011. She instigated the creation of a national care centre for victims of sexual violence in 2010. In October 2014, acting in her ministerial capacity, Niragira assisted those in Muramvya Province where torrential rain and hailstorms had destroyed 56 homes and damaged crops. She attended the 47th session of the United Nations Commission on Population and Development in April 2014. Whilst there she announced the aims of the Burundi 2025 initiative for sustainable development which seeks to reduce the rate of poverty from 67% to 33%, increase economic growth and reduce population growth from 2.4% to 2% per year.

At the 58th session of the United Nations Commission on the Status of Women Niragira committed to end violence against women in Burundi in accordance with the Kampala Declaration on Violence against Women and Girls. She announced that the country had adopted a national strategy to combat such acts including through the adoption of harsher sentences on trafficking, exploiting and prostituting women. Niragira returned to the commission for the 58th session where she revealed that Burundi had achieved equal numbers of boys and girls in primary education and the implementation of a quota system to encourage the employment of women in public services. She also restated Burundi's commitment to achieving the Millennium Development Goals. Niragira stated that her aims were to reduce the disparity in provision of post-primary education, empower women economically and reduce sexual violence.

Niragira remained National Solidarity Minister until at least 2015.

== Secretary-General of the Truth and Reconciliation Commission ==
Niragira was later appointed Secretary-General of the Burundian Truth and Reconciliation Commission, whose aim is to investigate the Burundian genocides; she appointed an international advisory council in March 2016, which allowed the work of the commission to begin. The commission has implemented a programme to identify and exhume mass graves, identify victims and perpetrators where possible and re-bury bodies with appropriate funerals. The first mass grave was excavated in June 2017; a further 2,500 are estimated to exist in the country. Niragira has promised to implement a system of compensation for the victims and their families. Niragira's appointment to the commission ended in December 2018.

== Death ==
From December 2020 Niragira was appointed regional director of an organisation in Kampala, Uganda, working to provide training in the field of gender-based sexual violence. Whilst there she was diagnosed with a serious illness, stated by her colleagues to be brain cancer. Niragira received treatment in Kampala and apparently made a recovery. She afterwards suffered a stroke and was hospitalised for a few days. At the end of 2020 she had recovered sufficiently to return to Burundi on holiday. However, Niragira suffered another stroke and was paralysed on one side of her body. She was medically evacuated to Nairobi, Kenya, on 14 January 2021. Niragira fell into a coma and died on 19 February 2021.

== See also ==
- List of the first women holders of political offices in Africa
