= Commune of Bugenyuzi =

Coordinates: 3°05′26″S 30°03′56″E

- Commune
- Interactive map of Commune of Bugenyuzi
- Country: Burundi
- Province: Karuzi Province
- Administrative center: Bugenyuzi
- Time zone: UTC+2 (Central Africa Time)

The commune of Bugenyuzi is a commune of Karuzi Province in central Burundi. The capital lies at Bugenyuzi.

== Notable people ==
- Clotilde Niragira, head of three different ministries under Pierre Nkurunziza.
