= Cyprien Mbonimpa =

Burundian diplomat

Cyprien Mbonimpa (born December 26, 1946) is a Burundian diplomat. He was his country's ambassador to Belgium (1980–85) and France (1985–87) and served as minister of foreign affairs in 1987–92.
