= Pierre Baranyanka =

Pierre Baranyanka was a Burundian chief and historian.

== Early life ==
Pierre Baranyanka was born in the late 1800s in the Kilimiro region near Gitega, Kingdom of Burundi. Ethnically, he was a Ganwa of the Tare clan, and a great-grandson of Mwami Ntare IV of Burundi. His father served as a chief in the Vyanda region. German military officers from German East Africa reached Burundi in the 1890s and brought it under their rule by establishing a post at Gitega. They opened a school there for the sons of chiefs, and Baranyanka attended it. He worked as a secretary for Richard Kandt.

Baranyanka was still a student at the time of the outbreak of World War I in 1914. At the time of the Belgian offensive into Burundi in 1916, he fled into German-held territory with two Germans and several Burundian associates. He travelled as far as Tabora before settling in Kigoma. During his several months of exile he managed porters and worked as an interpreter for German priests and doctors. He eventually returned to Burundi and established contact with Belgian colonial official Pierre Ryckmans. After the war, the Belgians established a new administration in Burundi as part of the League of Nations mandate of Ruanda-Urundi.

== Chief ==
Barayanka became a top source of information for Ryckmans who placed him on the regency council for the infant Mwami Mwambutsa IV in 1922. He became an avid supporter of the new administration and was granted numerous favours by the Belgians. He supported Catholic missionaries and himself converted to Catholicism. An advocate of cash-crops, he set up a coffee plantation and by 1935 owned 35,000 coffee bushes. Many European visitors praised him for having embraced a European lifestyle.

Baranyanka served as head of a chiefdom near Gitega until the Belgians appointed him chief of Ndora-Kayanza, Ngozi District in 1929. Ndora-Kayanza was the former domain of a Hutu leader, Kilima, and the territory had experienced several bouts of rebellion under his rule and until his death in 1920. Baranyanka established a palace at Rabiro. Within his domain, he was known as a somewhat despotic ruler, with the Belgians ceding him the authority to mediate legal disputes, collect taxes, recruit and manage forced labour, and represent the colonial administration. He encouraged his subjects to plant coffee, and used forced labour to develop his own coffee holdings. Numerous residents reported that he dealt out harsh physical discipline. Biographer Charles Ndayiziga wrote, "Baranyanka was not a friend of the people." Baranyanka preferred to act as a distant ruler, having instructions passed down to the populace through his subchiefs, though occasionally he hosted public meetings to issue work orders. An asthmatic, he often appeared in public holding a handkerchief to his face, though locals believed this was because he disliked the smell of common people.

Baranyanka's abuses, as well as irregular rains, stoked rumors of Kilima's return to regain his place as ruler. In 1934 a spiritual healer in the area, Inamujandi, began prophesising the coming of a new king who would usher in a golden age. As her support grew, residents began ignoring the authority of the Belgian-appointed chiefs. Baranyanka reported the incipient uprising to the Belgians, who arrested Inamujandi and crushed her rebellion. Ndora-Kayanza remained peaceful throughout the rest of Baranyanka's tenure as chief. Some locals moved to Rwanda to avoid his harsh taxation. While some residents remained dissatisfied with his harsh methods, others reflected that his tenure brought peace to the area and his promotion of coffee led to some prosperity. Chiefdoms were abolished in 1960 and Baranyanka was given a pension.

== Historical work ==
Baranyanka's close collaboration with the Belgian administration and missionaries led him to serve as an "informant" on precolonial history and myths for writers such as Peter Schumacher. In 1943 he published his own history of Burundi, titled Intsinzi Kartenda. He supported the conflation of the Ganwa ethnicity with the Tutsi ethnicity.

== Tare-Bezi rivalry ==
There existed a longstanding historical rivalry between the Tare Ganwa and the Bezi Ganwa, of which Mwambutsa IV was a member. The Belgian administration sought to unify Burundi under the monarch's control, but also collaborated with Tare leaders to limit his authority. Resident Ryckmans and one of his successors, Robert Schmidt, both thought Baranyanka would make for a preferable and more reliable ruler of Burundi than Mwambutsa. Despite this, Schmidt sometimes worried about his "open disobedience towards the mwami". His Belgian backing aggravated the Ganwa rivalry.

Baranyanka had five sons and seven daughters. Residents of his domain rumoured that he openly mocked the Mwami for not having as many children. In the 1950s the Belgians began introducing democratic reforms in Burundi, while the sons of both Baranyanka and Mwambutsa had aged and begun taking an interest in public affairs. In 1959 Baranyanka openly questioned whether Mwambutsa's marriage to his first wife, Thérèse Kanyonga, was legitimate according to custom in an attempt to challenge his eldest son's place in the line to the throne.

The monarch's eldest son, Prince Louis Rwagasore, had been educated in Belgium and, upon his return, became actively involved in a nationalist political party, the Union for National Progress (Union pour le Progres National, UPRONA). Baranyanka disliked UPRONA for advocating immediate independence from Belgium—which would harm his interests—and thought Rwagasore was arrogant. To counter UPRONA, in 1960 he sponsored the creation of a new political party, the Christian Democratic Party (Parti Démocratique Chrétien, PDC). Under the leadership of two of Baranyanka's sons, Joseph Biroli and Jean-Baptiste Ntidendereza, it advocated for internal autonomy and delayed independence. As a result, it received the support of the Belgian administration. While the PDC remained under Tare domination, UPRONA gained more broad-based support. One of Baranyanka's other sons, Charles, chose to join UPRONA.

As the PDC and UPRONA campaigned, the antipathy between Rwagasore and Baranyanka grew; the former feared an assassination plot sponsored by the chief, while the latter wrote letters to the Mwami to condemn him for failing to control his son. UPRONA gained ground in Baranyanka's chiefdom, and he responded by angrily threatening to have Rwagasore's in-laws in Rukecu raped by Twas and soldiers and have hunts burnt down. In June over 2,000 people gathered in Rukecu after hearing rumours that Rwagasore would appear to speak on behalf of UPRONA. When Baranyanka asked why they had gathered, they ignored his question and refused to address him. He declared to the crowd that all public meetings were prohibited and wrote to Mwambutsa to say that he would "not tolerate that [Rwagasore] should hold meetings in my chefferie."

Facing increasing insubordination from the populace, Baranyanka threatened to call upon the Belgians to occupy his chiefdom with troops. UPRONA members petitioned the administration to intervene, alleging that the chief was instigating violence. He had several UPRONA members arrested and tried before his own tribunal for failing to heed his call to a meeting. He sentenced the men to brief incarceration and ordered them to pay fines, but dissension in his chiefdom only increased. Municipal elections were held across Burundi in November 1960. UPRONA boycotted the polls, and the PDC won a majority of the communal bourgmestre offices. The bourgmestres replaced chiefs and subchiefs and, though Baranyanka lost his official position, he still held influence through his sons' leadership of the PDC.

Legislative elections were held in Burundi on 18 September 1961. With approximately 80% voter turnout, UPRONA won 58 of 64 seats in the Legislative Assembly, and Rwagasore was declared prime minister designate. On 13 October, Rwagasore was assassinated by a Greek merchant. Biroli and Ntidendereza were implicated in the conspiracy and charged accordingly. Some persons, including Rwagasore's successor, Prime Minister André Muhirwa, accused Baranyanka of having played a key role in the plot, but he was never charged. Biroli and Ntidendereza were eventually convicted and executed in January 1963.

== Later life ==
Following Burundi's independence, Baranyanka became politically impotent; popular association of him with the murder of Rwagasore severely harmed his reputation. Mourning the loss of his sons, he drifted into obscurity and poverty. He died in the late 1960s or early 1970s.

== Works cited ==
- Akyeampong, Emmanuel Kwaku; Gates, Henry Louis, eds. (2012). Dictionary of African Biography. Vol. 1. Oxford University Press USA. ISBN 9780195382075.
- Chrétien, Jean-Pierre (2016). "La guerre de 1914-1918 au Burundi. Le vécu local d'un conflit mondial". Outre-Mers (in French). 1 (390–391): 127–151. doi:10.3917/om.161.0127.
- Ghislain, Jean (1970). La Féodalité au Burundi (PDF) (in French). Brussels: Académie royale des Sciences d’Outre-Mer. OCLC 2115033.
- Lemarchand, René (1970). Rwanda and Burundi. New York: Praeger Publishers. OCLC 254366212.
- Russell, Aidan (2019). Politics and Violence in Burundi: The Language of Truth in an Emerging State. Cambridge: Cambridge University Press. ISBN 978-1-108-49934-7.
- Weinstein, Warren (1976). Historical Dictionary of Burundi. Metuchen: Scarecrow Press. ISBN 978-0-8108-0962-8.
