= Ministry of Justice (Burundi) =

Government ministry of Burundi

Ministry of Justice, Human Rights, and Gender
- Ministère de la Justice, des Droits de la Personne Humaine et du Genre (French)
- Coat of arms of Burundi

Ministry overview
- Formed: 1962
- Jurisdiction: Government of Burundi
- Headquarters: Boulevard de l’Uprona n° 51. 1221 A B.P 1880 Bujumbura
- Minister responsible: Hon. Alfred Ahingejeje
- Ministry executives: Rosalie Nahishakiye, Permanent Secretary; Parfait Hatungimana, Assistant Minister
- Website: justice.gov.bi

The Ministry of Justice, Keeper of the Government Seals, Human Rights and Gender performs tasks such as the following:

- Promote judicial cooperation and training and inspect any related institutions
- Educate litigants by disseminating legal information and providing translation if necessary
- Ensure human rights and ministerial collaboration
- Monitor cases that are gender-based or minor-related violations

The following administrations are under the leadership of the Ministry of Justice:

- General Directorate of Penitentiary Affairs
- Directorate of the Conservation of Land Titles
- Center for Studies and Legal Documentation
- Professional Training Center of Justice
- National Service of Legislation

== History ==
On 7 March 1965, the Mwami issued a royal decree removing the ministry of justice from the control of Parliament to put it "above all political rivalries" and placing it under the control of a secretary of state responsible to the Mwami.

In August 2025, under the new cabinet of Prime Minister Nestor Ntahontuyecertain ministry were merged. The Ministry of National Solidarity, Social Affairs, Human Rights and Gender was merged with the Ministry of Justice creating a new Ministry called Ministry of Justice, Keeper of the Government Seals, Human Rights and Gender.

== List of ministers (Post-1962 upon achieving independence) ==
- Claver Nuwinkware (1961–1964)
- Pierre Ngunzu (1964–1965)
- Artémon Simbananiye (1965–1972)
- Albert Shibura (1973–1975) [referred to as Minister of Interior and Justice]
- Philippe Minani (1975–1976)
- Jean-Baptiste Manwangari (1977–1978)
- Laurent Nzeyimana (1979–1982)
- Vincent Ndikumasabo (1983–1986)
- Aloys Ndenzakoo (1987)
- Evariste Niyonkuro (1988–1991)
- Sebastian Ntahuga (1992–1993)
- Fulgence Dwima-Bakana (1994)
- Melchior Ntahobama (1994–1995)
- Gerard Ngendaganya (1996)
- Gervais Rubashamuheto (1997)
- Thérence Sinunguruza (1998– 2001)
- Fulgence Dwima Bakana (2002–2003)
- Didace Kiganahe (2004-2005)
- Clotilde Niragira (2005-2007) [1st female]
- Jean Bosco Ndikumana (2007-2010)
- Ancille Ntakaburimvo (2010-2011)
- Pascal Barandagiye (2011–2015)
- Aimée Laurentine Kanyana (2015–2020)
- Jeanine Nibizi (2020–2022)
- Domine Banyankimbona (2022-2025)
- Arthémon Katihabwa (5 August 2025- 23 Janvier 2026) [1st Twa]
- Alfred Ahingejeje(23 Janvier 2026–Present)

== See also ==
- Justice ministry
- Politics of Burundi

== Works cited ==
- Weinstein, Warren (1976). Historical Dictionary of Burundi. Metuchen: Scarecrow Press. ISBN 9780810809628.
