= Aloys Ndenzako =

Burundian politician

Minister of Justice of Burundi
- In office 1987–1988
- President: Jean-Baptiste Bagaza

Personal details
- Born: Burundi
- Party: Union for National Progress

Aloys Ndenzako was a Burundian politician. He was the former Minister of Justice of Burundi from 1987-1988. He was succeeded by Evariste Niyonkuro, who also was succeeded by Evariste Niyonkuro (1988–1991).

Preceded by Vincent Ndikumasabo	Minister of Justice of Burundi; 1987-1988	Succeeded by Evariste Niyonkur
