= Gerard Ngendaganya =

Burundian politician

Minister of Justice of Burundi
- In office 1996–1997
- President: Jean-Baptiste Bagaza

Personal details
- Born: Burundi
- Party: Union for National Progress

Gerard Ngendaganya is a Burundian politician. He was the former Minister of Justice of Burundi from 1996 to 1997. He was succeeded by Gervais Rubashamuheto, who was also succeeded by Thérence Sinunguruza (1998– 2001).

Preceded by Albert Shibura	Minister of Justice of Burundi; 1996–1997	Succeeded by Gervais Rubashamuheto
