= Evariste Niyonkuro =

Burundian politician

Minister of Justice of Burundi
- In office 1988–1991
- President: Jean-Baptiste Bagaza

Personal details
- Born: Burundi
- Party: Union for National Progress

Evariste Niyonkuro was a Burundian politician. He was the former Minister of Justice of Burundi from 1988 to 1991. He was succeeded by Sebastian Ntahuga, who also was succeeded by Fulgence Dwima-Bakana in 1994.

| Preceded by Aloys Ndenzako | Minister of Justice of Burundi; 1988–1991 | Succeeded by Sebastian Ntahuga |
