= Truth and Reconciliation Commission (Burundi) =

Truth and reconciliation commission in Burundi

- Commission de vérité et réconciliation

Agency overview
- Formed: 2014
- Type: Truth and reconciliation commission
- Jurisdiction: Government of Burundi
- Headquarters: Mukaza, Bujumbura, Burundi
- Agency executives: Amb. Pierre Claver Ndayicariye, President of the commission; Msgr. Aimé Joseph Kimararungu, Vice president of the commission; Léa Pascasie Nzigamasabo, Secretary of the commission
- Website: www.cvr.bi

Burundi's Truth and Reconciliation Commission (TRC) (French: Commission vérité et réconciliation, CVR) is a truth and reconciliation commission established in the African country of Burundi to investigate crimes during ethnic conflict which started after the country became independent in 1962. The TRC arose from the Arusha Agreement of 2000. Established by the ruling CNDD-FDD party in 2014, the commission was intended to run for an initial four years; however, its terms of reference were extended for a further four years in 2018.

Pierre Claver Ndayicariye is chairperson of the TRC. Clotilde Niragira was Secretary-General. She appointed an international advisory council in March 2016, which allowed the work of the commission to begin. Niragira's appointment to the commission ended in December 2018.

Massacres took place in 1965, 1969, 1972, 1988 and 1993. The commission implemented a programme to identify and exhume mass graves, identify victims and perpetrators where possible and re-bury bodies with appropriate funerals. The first mass grave was excavated in June 2017; a further 2,500 were estimated to exist in the country. Niragira promised to implement a system of compensation for the victims and their families. A report presented to parliament in early 2020 revealed that over 4,000 mass graves had been discovered, and 142,505 victims identified.

Public opinion was divided upon its creation, and the commission has since been criticised for not being impartial, but Ndayicariye says that criticisms are politically motivated.

In August 2024, parliament voted to replace the commissioners of the TRC. Among the 13 new commissioners is the former foreign affairs minister Laurent Kavakure; the former ambassador of Burundi to India, Stella Budiriganya and the former ambassador of Burundi to Egypt, Selemani Mossi. Pierre Claver Ndayicariye was reelected as chairperson of the TRC.

== Members of the commission (2024-today) ==
Name	Position		
Name	Position	Amb. Pierre Claver Ndayicariye	President of the commission
Msgr. Aimé Joseph Kimararungu	Vice president of the commission		
Léa Pascasie Nzigamasabo	Secretary of the commission		
Amb. Laurent Kavakure	Commissioner		
Amb. Stella Budiriganyi	Commissioner		
Amb. Eng. Selemani Mossi	Commissioner		
Rev. P. Elie Nahimana	Commissioner		
Déo Ndikumana	Commissioner		
Alice Nijimbere	Commissioner		
Fr. Pascal Niyonkuru	Commissioner		
Hon. Denise Sindokotse	Commissioner		
Charlotte Rukundo	Commissioner		
Vianney Ndikumana	Commissioner		

== See also ==
- Ikiza
- 1993 ethnic violence in Burundi
