= Laurent Nzeyimana =

Burundian politician

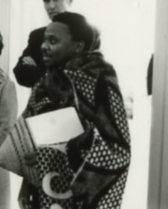

Minister of Justice of Burundi
- In office 1979–1982
- President: Michel Micombero

Personal details
- Born: Burundi
- Party: Union for National Progress

Laurent Nzeyimana was a Burundian politician who served as the Minister of Justice of Burundi from 1979 to 1982. He was succeeded by Jean-Baptiste Manwangari, who, in turn, was also succeeded by Vincent Ndikumasabo (1983–1986).

Preceded by Jean-Baptiste Manwangar	Minister of Justice of Burundi; 1979–1982	Succeeded by Vincent Ndikumasabo
