= Joseph Bukera =

Joseph Bukera (born 1932) is a Burundian jurist. He served as the Burundian Secretary of State for Justice, Surêté, and Immigration from March to 10 September 1965 and President of the Supreme Court of Burundi from 29 February 1968 to 8 October 1974.

== Early life ==
Joseph Bukera was born in 1932 in Muyaga, Ruyigi Province, Ruanda-Urundi. Ethnically, he was Tutsi. He received his primary education and much of his secondary education at the Muyaga Minor Seminary before enrolling at the Burasira Major Seminary, where he studied for two years. He subsequently studied liberal arts at the Official University of the Congo and Ruanda-Urundi from 1958 to 1960, and secured a law degree from the Free University of Brussels in 1964. He married a Belgian woman.

== Career ==
Bukera was appointed to the Supreme Court of Burundi on 15 October 1964. In March 1965 he became Secretary of State for Justice, Surêté, and Immigration under Prime Minister Joseph Bamina. He was also tasked by Mwami Mwambutsa IV with overseeing government preparations for the 1965 Burundian legislative election as head of the electoral commission. Under his management, the elections were conducted in a free and fair atmosphere. He was replaced at the justice secretariat by Artémon Simbananiye on 10 September. At the International Commission of Jurists meeting in Dakar in January 1967, he served as rapporteur for a committee studying public opinion on the rule of law.

Bukera was appointed President of the Supreme Court on 29 February 1968. In February 1973 he was appointed to the Magistrates Study Commission. He was replaced by Gaéten Rugambara as President of the Supreme Court on 8 October 1974.

== Works cited ==
- Année Africaine 1974 (in French). Paris: Éditions A. Pedone. 1975. OCLC 867231259.
- Ngayimpenda, Evariste (2003). Histoire du conflit politico-ethnique burundais: les premieres marches du calvaire (1960-1973) (in French). Editions de la Renaissance. ISBN 9782842230036.
- Ntibazonkiza, Raphaël (1992). Au royaume des seigneurs de la lance: De l'indépendance à nos jours (1962-1992) (in French). Bruxelles droits de l'homme. ISBN 978-2-9600041-1-3.
- Weinstein, Warren (1976). Historical Dictionary of Burundi. Metuchen: Scarecrow Press. ISBN 978-0-8108-0962-8.
- Weeramantry, Lucian G. (2021). The International Commission of Jurists: The Pioneering Years. Brill. ISBN 9789004478770.
