= Didace Kiganahe =

Burundian politician

Minister of Justice of Burundi
- In office 2004–2005
- President: Jean-Baptiste Bagaza

Personal details
- Born: Burundi
- Party: Union for National Progress

Didace Kiganahe is a Burundian politician, activist and military officer. He served as the Minister of Justice of Burundi from 2004 to 2005. He was succeeded by Clotilde Niragira, who was also succeeded by Jean Bosco Ndikumana (2007-2010).

== Background ==
=== Early life ===
Didace Kiganahe was born on January 15, 1965, in the Commune of Buganda, Province of Cibitoke, Burundi to parents who were farmers.

=== Education ===
Kiganahe attended primary school in Buganda and secondary school in Cibitoke. He then joined the Burundian military academy, where he graduated with a degree in military science. He furthered his education at the University of Burundi, earning a degree in political science.

=== Political career ===
Kiganahe's political career began in 1993 when he joined the Burundian army. In 2005, he was appointed Minister of Defense by President Pierre Nkurunziza, a position he held until 2010. He then served as Minister of Interior and Security from 2010 to 2015. He was a key ally of President Nkurunziza and played a crucial role in maintaining the president's power during the 2015 political unrest.

== Allegations ==
Kiganahe has faced allegations of human rights abuses, particularly during the 2015 political unrest. He was accused of ordering the military to use excessive force against protesters, resulting in numerous deaths and injuries. However, Kiganahe has denied these allegations, stating that the military acted in self-defense.

Preceded by Fulgence Dwima Bakana	Minister of Justice of Burundi; 2004-2005	Succeeded by Clotilde Niragira
