= Fulgence Dwima Bakana =

Burundian politician

Minister of Justice of Burundi
- In office 2002–2003
- President: Jean-Baptiste Bagaza

Personal details
- Born: Burundi
- Party: Union for National Progress

Fulgence Dwima Bakana is a Burundian politician. From 2002 to 2003, he served as Minister of Justice of Burundi. He was succeeded by Didace Kiganahe, who was in turn succeeded by Clotilde Niragira (2005-2007), the first woman to hold such position.

Preceded by Thérence Sinunguruza	Minister of Justice of Burundi; 2002–2003	Succeeded by Didace Kiganahe
