= Artémon Simbananiye =

Burundian politician (1935–2024)

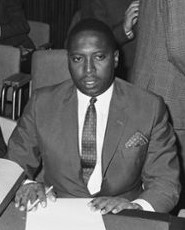
Artémon Simbananiye in 1970

Artémon Simbananiye (1935 – 22 July 2024) was a Burundian politician.

== Early life ==
Artémon Simbananiye was born in 1935 in Bihanga, a settlement near Matana in Bururi Province, Ruanda-Urundi. Ethnically, he was a part of the Babanda clan of the Tutsi-Hima group. He studied in Belgium and France, earning a law degree from the University of Paris in 1962.

== Political career ==
Politically, Simbananiye was an early member of the Union for National Progress (UPRONA) party. Upon returning to Burundi in 1962 he was appointed Director General of the Ministry of Justice. On 10 September 1965 Mwami Mwambutsa IV of Burundi appointed him Secretary of State for Justice, replacing Joseph Bukera. Following the failure of a Hutu-led coup attempt that year, Simbananiye oversaw the government's repression of Hutu leaders and refused to cooperate with the International Commission of Jurists' delegate sent to observe the trial of alleged putschists.

Simbananiye was opposed to the monarchal system and oversaw the execution several members of Mwambutsa's entourage in the coup's aftermath. In August 1966 he rescinded a royal decree banning youth political movements. On 28 November 1966 Colonel Michel Micombero, launched a coup, displacing the monarchy and becoming President of Burundi. He dismissed the government and appointed Simbananiye Procureur Général of the new Republic of Burundi. On 6 December he was appointed Minister of Justice, whilst still holding the office of Procureur Général. In March 1967 the responsibility for the Sûreté Nationale and immigration services was added to his ministerial portfolio. He and Sûreté Director Albert Shibura exercised extensive influence upon the Micombero regime's internal politics, and he arranged for fellow Matana Tutsis to receive high postings in the government, the Burundi National Army, and UPRONA. Viewed by Micombero with suspicion as a political threat, in October 1967 he was stripped of his offices during a political purge. On 4 November he was arrested and incarcerated at a prison in Muyinga Province for allegedly embezzling state funds.

Despite his initially tenuous position under Micombero, Simbananiye rose to become a key member of the Groupe de Bururi, a coterie of officials in the regime that hailed from the same province and sought to consolidate their own power. In 1971 he was appointed Minister of Foreign Affairs and filled the ministry posts with mostly southerners. In July he helped organise a purge of Tutsi-Banyaruguru from the government. The Tutsi-Banyaruguru hailed from the north of the country and were viewed as rivals by the Groupe de Bururi. When they were put on trial for allegedly plotting to kill the president, Simbananiye summoned one of their main defence attorneys to accompany him on a foreign trip, preventing the lawyer from participating in most of the proceedings. Several of the accused were found guilty and sentenced to death and life imprisonment in January 1972, though Micombero quickly commuted the sentences and released most of convicted.

== Later life ==
In 1987 Simbananiye left Burundi and went into exile. He returned several years later, proclaiming himself to be a born again Christian. He died on 22 July 2024 in Kigali.

== Works cited ==
- Lemarchand, René (1970). Rwanda and Burundi. New York: Praeger Publishers. OCLC 254366212.
- Ngayimpenda, Evariste (2003). Histoire du conflit politico-ethnique burundais: les premieres marches du calvaire (1960–1973) (in French). Editions de la Renaissance. ISBN 9782842230036.
- Russell, Aiden (2019). Politics and Violence in Burundi: The Language of Truth in an Emerging State. Cambridge University Press. ISBN 978-1-108-49934-7.
- Weinstein, Warren (1976). Historical Dictionary of Burundi. Metuchen: Scarecrow Press. ISBN 978-0-8108-0962-8.
