= Jean-Baptiste Manwangari =

Burundian politician

Jean-Baptiste Manwangari is a Burundian born in the 1950s. He is from the Kirundo Province. He was a member of the Pan-African Parliament from Burundi. Manwangari is a member of the nationalist Union for National Progress party. He is also a Tutsi. Since the beginning of his political career, under the chairmanship of President Jean-Baptiste Bagaza, he is an influential member of Union for National Progress party of which he was the chairman. He was member of various governments since 1976. He was on the head of different ministries, such as Justice, Interior, Transport, Post and Telecommunications, territorial administration and was a leading senior advisor to the President Pierre Buyoya for political and legal questions. He was also a long time a member of parliament as MP and Senator.
