= Jean Bosco Ndikumana =

Burundian politician

Minister of Justice and Keeper of the Government Seals of Burundi
- In office 14 November 2007 – 11 August 2013
- President: Pierre Nkurunziza

Personal details
- Born: Burundi
- Party: CNDD–FDD

Jean Bosco Ndikumana is a Burundian politician. Ndikumana was the former Minister of Justice and Keeper of the Government Seals in Burundi, having been appointed to the position in 2007 by the former president of Burundi, Pierre Nkurunziza. The term began on 14 November 2007.

Awards and achievements
| Preceded by | Minister of Justice and Keeper of the Government Seals of Burundi | Succeeded by |
