= Charles Baranyanka =

Burundian diplomat and historian (1935–2021)

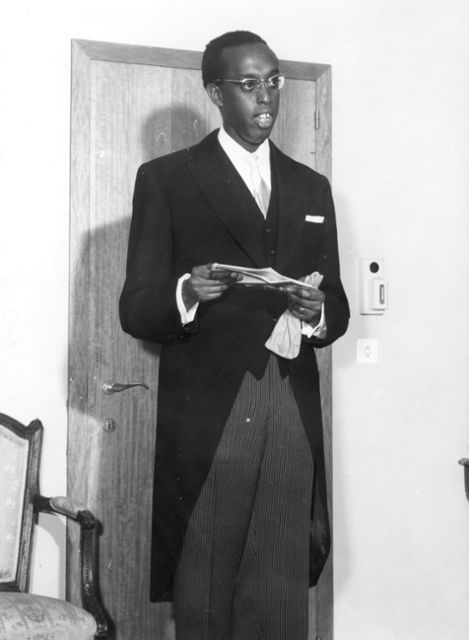
Charles Baranyanka, 1962

Charles Baranyanka (1935 – 1 August 2021) was a Burundian diplomat and historian.

== Early life ==
Charles Baranyanka was born in 1935 in Rabiro, Ngozi Province, Ruanda-Urundi. His father, Pierre Baranyanka, was a chief who had close connections with the Belgian colonial administration. Ethnically, he was a Ganwa of the Tare lineage. He attended the Groupe Scolaire d'Astrida before studying political science at the University of Liège from 1958 to 1961. He married a Belgian woman.

== Career ==
Unlike his brothers, who became leading members of the Christian Democratic Party (Parti Démocratique Chrétien, PDC), Baranyanka chose to support the Union for National Progress (Union pour le Progres National, UPRONA). After completing his studies in 1961 he became the chargé d'affaires of Burundi's delegation to the European Economic Community (EEC). The following year he was made Burundi's permanent representative to the EEC.

In 1965 Baranyanka was appointed Ambassador to France. He subsequently became Ambassador to Switzerland. In February 1967 the Burundian government recalled him to Bujumbura and arrested him for embezzlement and jeopardising state security. He was acquitted on the first charge but incarcerated for the second count until July 1969. He was nominated by Minister of Foreign Affairs Libère Ndabakwaje to become Ambassador to the United States, but the incumbent, Terence Nsanze, garnered support to suppress it. He then became the chef de cabinet for Ndabakwaje. Ndabakwaje was then made Minister of Economy and Baranyanka moved to that ministry to occupy the same post. In 1971 he was accused by Henri Ntakiyica—who had been incarcerated since 1961 of plotting with Baranyanka's brothers to assassinate Louis Rwagasore—of conspiring with other officials to hire assassins to kill President Michel Micombero. Baranyanka was arrested and detained until 1974. He later became a historian, and in 2015 published a history of Burundi, Le Burundi face à la croix et à la bannière.

Baranyanka died on 1 August 2021.

== Works cited ==
- Russell, Aiden (2019). Politics and Violence in Burundi: The Language of Truth in an Emerging State. Cambridge: Cambridge University Press. ISBN 978-1-108-49934-7.
- Weinstein, Warren (1976). Historical Dictionary of Burundi. Metuchen: Scarecrow Press. ISBN 978-0-8108-0962-8.
