= Judiciary of Burundi =

The Judiciary of Burundi is the branch of the Government of the Republic of Burundi which interprets and applies the laws of Burundi to ensure impartial justice under law and to provide a mechanism for dispute resolution. The independence of the judiciary is guaranteed by the constitution.

The judicial system in Burundi is based upon French and German customary law and comprises the Supreme Court, the Courts of Appeal, Constitutional Courts and Tribunals of First Instance.

The President of the Court of Appeal, the presidents of the High Courts, the public prosecutors and the state counsels are appointed by the President of the Republic following nomination by the Judicial Service Commission and approval by the Senate.

== Supreme Court ==
The Supreme Court is divided into three chambers, the Administrative Chamber, the Judicial Chamber and the Chamber of Cassation. It has both original and appellate jurisdiction over civil and criminal matters and consists of nine members, including the President of the court. A National Department of Public Prosecutions is also attached.

== Courts of Appeal ==
The Courts of Appeal comprise three courts which are based at Bujumbura, Ngozi and Gitega.

== Tribunals of First Instance ==
These are local county courts, one in each of the 18 provinces.

== Courts of Residence ==
The 127 Courts of Residence (Resident Magistrate's Courts) operate at the Commune level and deal with both criminal and civil cases, including land matters, matters relating to evictions, family and persons related matters and infractions against the Highway Code. The Courts have limits on the fines and custodial sentences they can award.

== Constitutional Court ==
The Constitutional Court ensures that all laws are adhere strictly to the Constitution and also decides on issues relating to human rights violations. It has seven members appointed by the President of the Republic and approved by the Senate. Together with the Supreme Court, the Constitutional Court constitutes the High Court of Justice, which has the power to try the president and other senior members of the government for high treason.

== Specialised Courts ==
Specialized commercial, administrative and labour courts and courts martial also exist.

== Judicial Service Commission ==
The Judicial Service Commission is made up of five members nominated by the Executive, three judges of the Supreme Court, two magistrates from the National Department of Public Prosecutions, two judges from the resident magistrates' courts and three members of the legal profession in private practice.
