= Laurent Kavakure =

Burundian diplomat and politician

Laurent Kavakure (born January 5, 1959) is a Burundian diplomat and politician who served the Minister of Foreign Affairs of Burundi from November 2011 to May 2015.

Kavakure was born in Tangara, Ngozi Province. He was Burundi's Ambassador to Belgium from 2006 to 2010.

Kavakure was dismissed from his post as Minister of Foreign Affairs on May 18, 2015, shortly after a failed coup attempt during the 2015 Burundian unrest, which started after President Pierre Nkurunziza stated he wished to run for office a third time. Observers stated that his dismissal might be due to Kavakure failing to convince other states to support the 2015 presidential elections.

In August 2024, Kavakure was voted as a new commissioner in the Truth and Reconciliation Commission of Burundi alongside 12 other commissioner of which; Stella Budiriganya (former ambassador to India) and Selemani Mossi (former ambassador to Egypt).
