= Gervais Rubashamuheto =

Burundian politician

Minister of Justice of Burundi
- In office 1997–1998
- President: Jean-Baptiste Bagaza

Personal details
- Born: Burundi
- Party: Union for National Progress

Gervais Rubashamuheto is a Burundian politician. He was the former Minister of Justice of Burundi from 1997 to 1998. He was succeeded by Thérence Sinunguruza,

Preceded by Gerard Ngendaganya	Minister of Justice of Burundi; 1997–1998	Succeeded by Thérence Sinunguruza
