= Outline of Burundi =

Country in Central Africa

The Flag of Burundi

The Coat of arms of Burundi

The location of Burundi

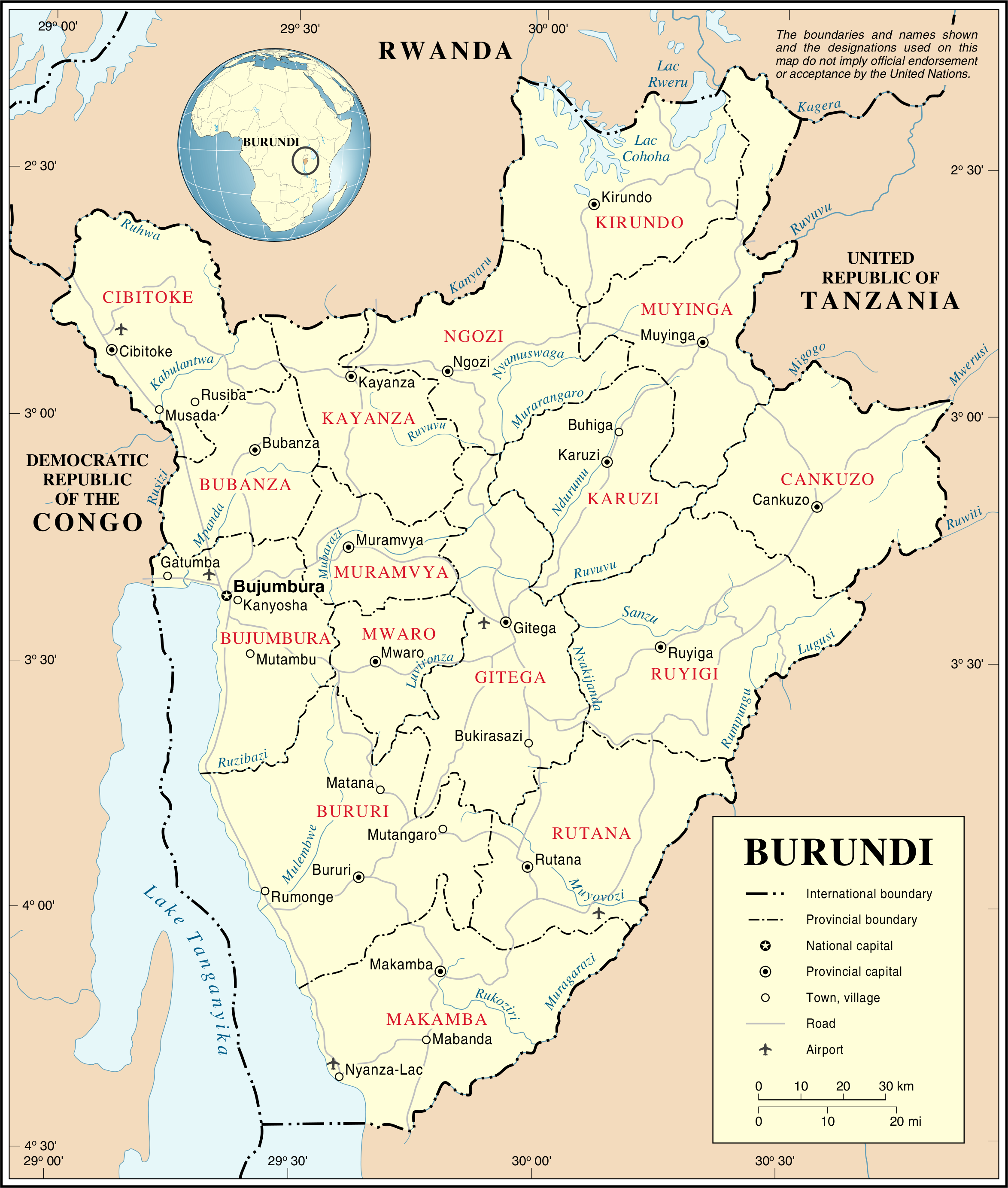
An enlargeable map of Burundi

The following outline is provided as an overview of and topical guide to Burundi:

Burundi is a small sovereign country located in the Great Lakes region of Africa. Geographically isolated, facing population pressures and having sparse resources, Burundi has the lowest GDP per capita in the world, arguably making it the poorest country on the planet. One scientific study of 178 nations rated Burundi's population as having the lowest satisfaction with life of all.

== General reference ==
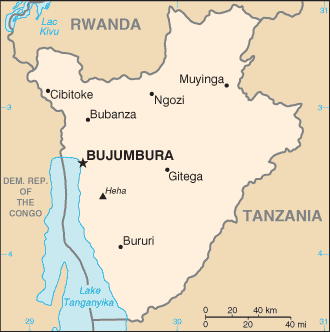
An enlargeable basic map of Burundi

- Pronunciation: /bəˈrʊndɪ/ or /bəˈrʌndi/
- Common English country name: Burundi
- Official English country name: The Republic of Burundi
- Common endonym(s):
- Official endonym(s):
- Adjectival(s): Burundian
- Demonym(s): Burundian(s), Barundi
- ISO country codes: BI, BDI, 108
- ISO region codes: See ISO 3166-2:BI
- Internet country code top-level domain: .bi

== Geography of Burundi ==
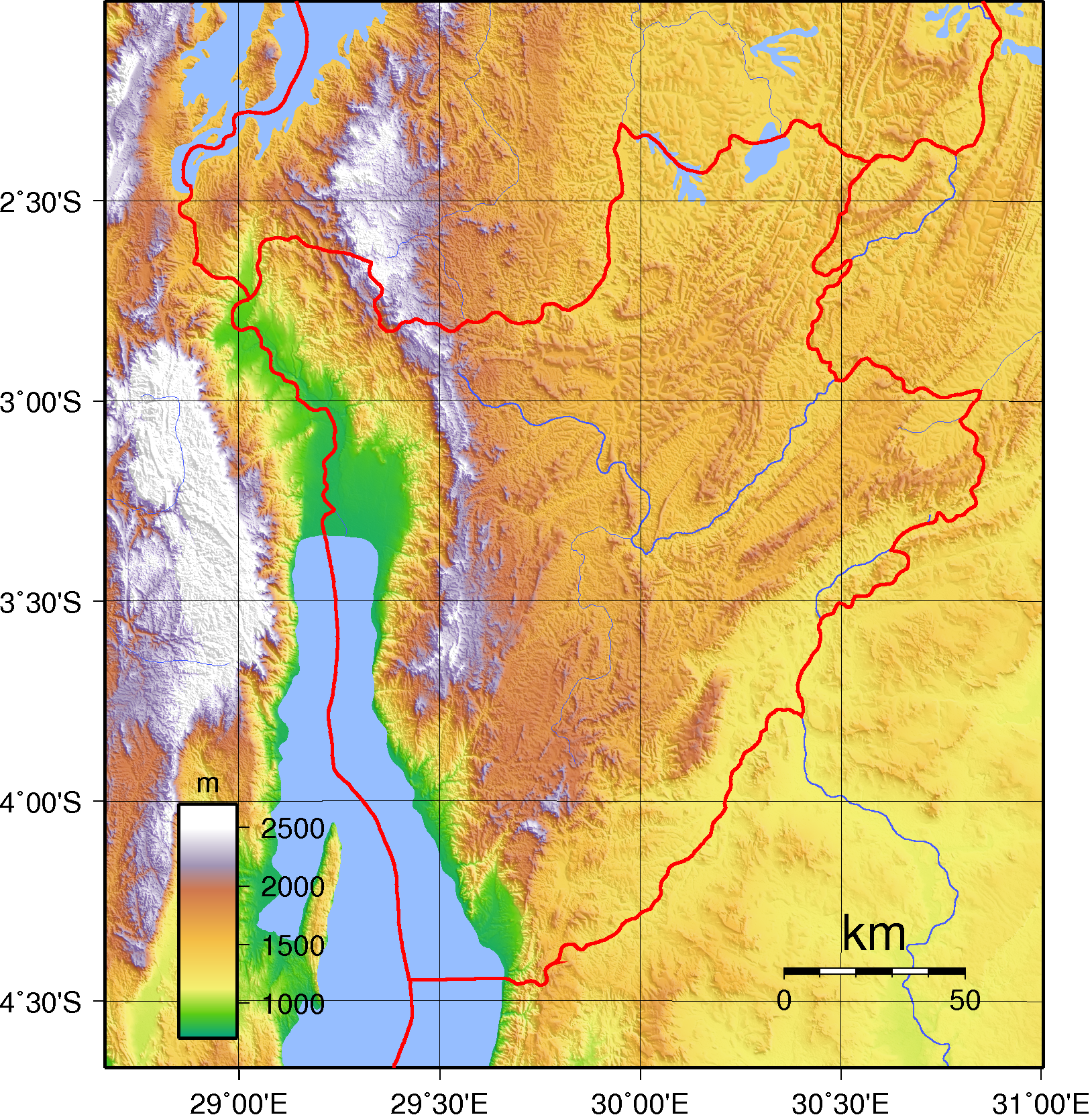
An enlargeable topographic map of Burundi

Geography of Burundi

- Burundi is: a landlocked country
- Location: Africa
  - Southern Hemisphere and Eastern Hemisphere
  - Africa
    - Central Africa
    - East Africa
  - Time zone: Central Africa Time (UTC+02)
  - Extreme points of Burundi
    - High: Mount Heha 2,684 m (8,806 ft)
    - Low: Lake Tanganyika 772 m (2,533 ft)
  - Land boundaries: 974 km

Tanzania 451 km
Rwanda 290 km
Democratic Republic of the Congo 233 km

- Coastline: none

- Population: 3,589,434(1978)
- Size: 27,830 square kilometres (10,750 sq mi) - 145th largest country
- Atlas of Burundi

=== Environment of Burundi ===
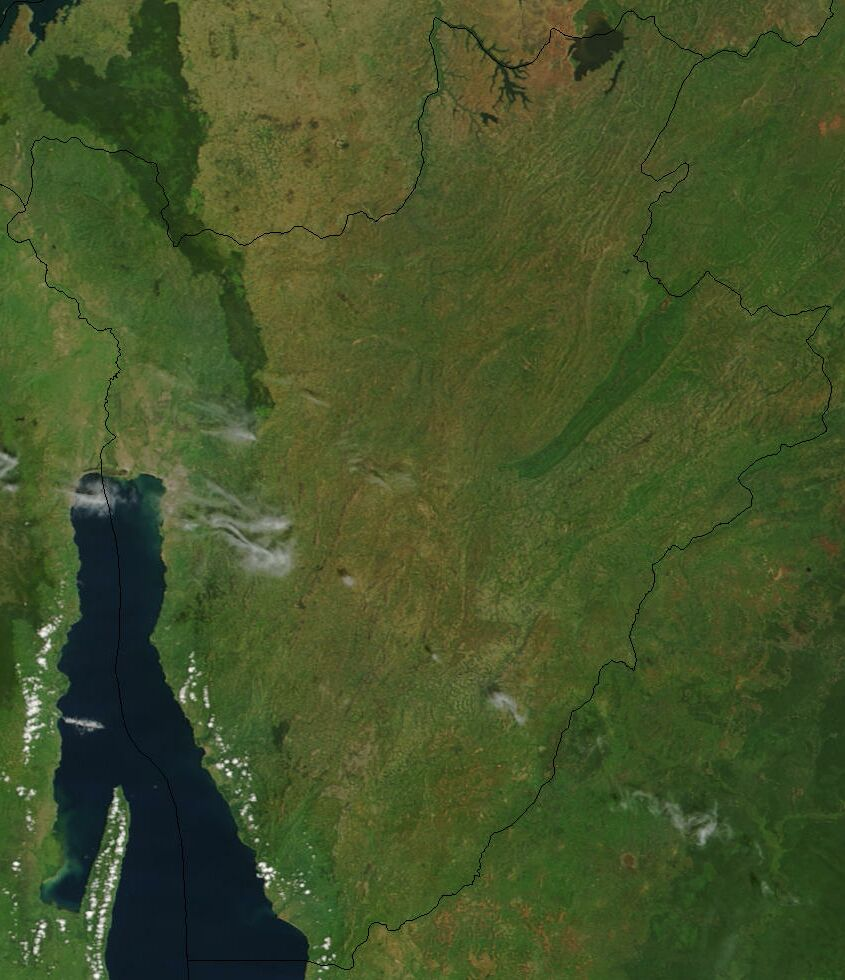
An enlargeable satellite image of Burundi

- Climate of Burundi
- Ecoregions in Burundi
- Geology of Burundi
- Protected areas of Burundi
  - National parks of Burundi
- Wildlife of Burundi
  - Fauna of Burundi
    - Birds of Burundi
    - Mammals of Burundi

==== Natural geographic features of Burundi ====
- Glaciers in Burundi: none
- Lakes of Burundi
  - Lake Tanganyika
  - Lake Cohoha
  - Lake Rweru
- Mountains of Burundi
  - Mitumba Mountains
- Rivers of Burundi
  - Kagera River
  - Ruvyironza River
  - Rurubu River
  - Ruzizi River
- World Heritage Sites in Burundi: none

=== Regions of Burundi ===
==== Ecoregions of Burundi ====
List of ecoregions in Burundi

==== Administrative divisions of Burundi ====
Administrative divisions of Burundi

===== Provinces of Burundi =====
Current Provinces of Burundi (from 2025)

Current Provinces of Burundi (from 2025)
Province Name
Bujumbura
Buhumuza
Burunga
Butanyerera
Gitega

Communes of Burundi

Communes of Burundi

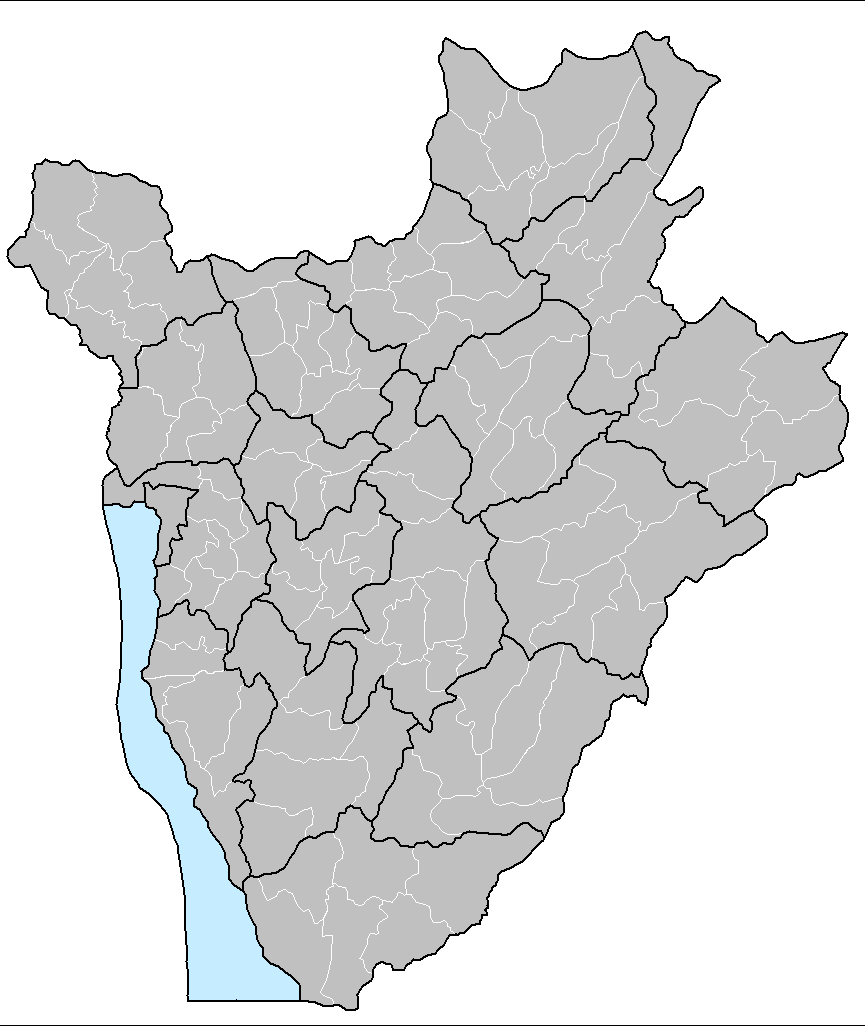
Communes of Burundi

The provinces of Burundi are divided into 117 communes, which are further divided into 2,637 collines.

===== Collines of Burundi =====
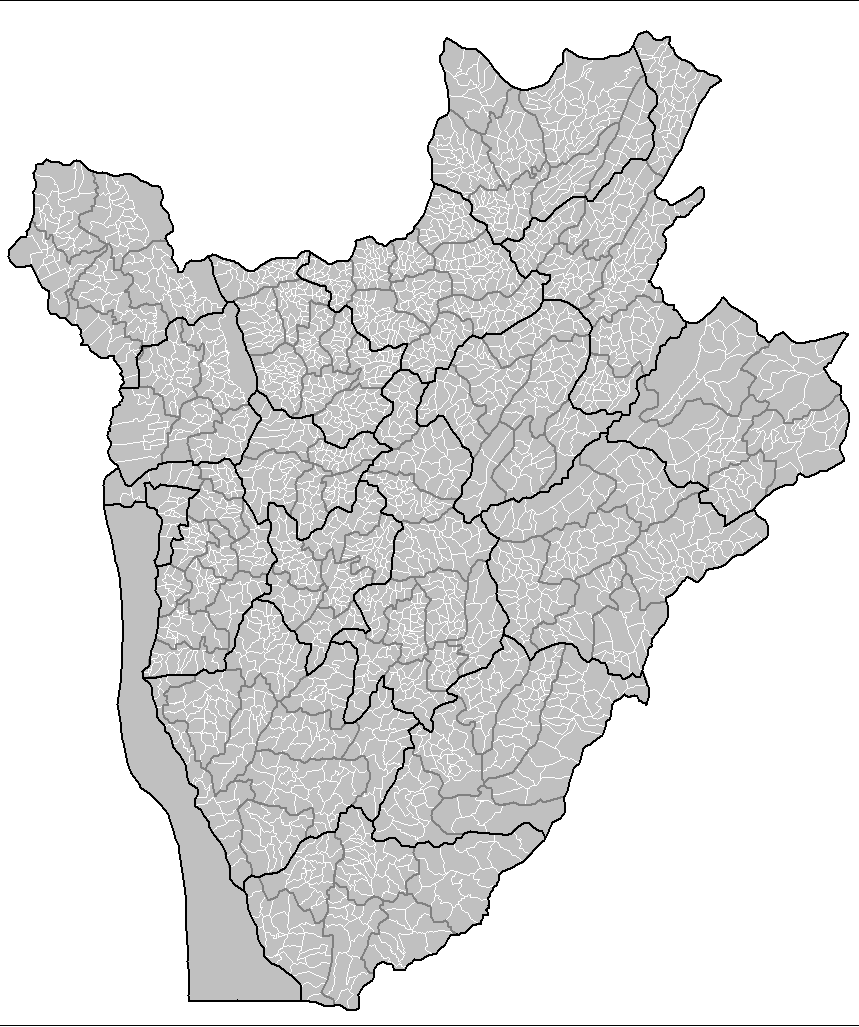

- Capitals of Burundi:
  - Political Capital: Gitega
  - Economic Capital: Bujumbura
- Cities of Burundi
- List of cities in Burundi
  - Bubanza
  - Bujumbura
  - Bururi
  - Cankuzo
  - Cibitoke
  - Gitega
  - Karuzi
  - Kayanza
  - Kibumbu
  - Kirundo
  - Makamba
  - Muramvya
  - Muyinga
  - Mwaro
  - Ngozi
  - Rutana
  - Ruyigi

=== Demography of Burundi ===
Demographics of Burundi

== Government and politics of Burundi ==
Politics of Burundi

- Form of government: presidential representative democratic republic
- Capitals of Burundi:
  - Political Capital: Gitega
  - Economic Capital: Bujumbura
- Elections in Burundi
- Political parties in Burundi
- Rulers of Burundi
- United Nations Integrated Office in Burundi

=== Branches of government ===
Government of Burundi

==== Executive branch of the government of Burundi ====
- Head of state: President of Burundi
  - Vice-President of Burundi
- Head of government: Prime Minister of Burundi
  - List of heads of government of Burundi
- Cabinet of Burundi: Council of Ministers

===== Ministries of the Burundian Government =====
- Ministry of the Interior, Community Development, and Public Security
- Ministry of Foreign Affairs and Development Cooperation
- Ministry of Mineral Resources, Energy, Industry, Trade and Tourism
- Ministry of Justice, Human Rights, and Gender

==== Legislative branch of the government of Burundi ====
- Parliament of Burundi (bicameral)
  - Upper house: Senate of Burundi (upper chamber)
  - Lower house: National Assembly of Burundi (lower chamber)

==== Judicial branch of the government of Burundi ====
Court system of Burundi

- Supreme Court of Burundi
- Constitutional Court of Burundi

=== Foreign relations of Burundi ===
Foreign relations of Burundi

- Diplomatic missions in Burundi
- Diplomatic missions of Burundi
- United States-Burundi relations
- Burundi–Democratic Republic of the Congo relations
- Burundi–Kenya relations
- Burundi–Rwanda relations
- Burundi–Tanzania relations
- Burundi–China relations
- Burundi–India relations
- Burundi–Germany relations
- Burundi–Netherlands relations
- Burundi–Russia relations
- Burundi–Turkey relations

==== International organization membership ====
The Republic of Burundi is a member of:

- East African Community (EAC)
- Common Market for Eastern and Southern Africa (COMESA)
- International Conference on the Great Lakes Region (ICGLR)
- Coordinating Committee on Export Controls (COCOM)
- International Atomic Energy Agency (IAEA)
- International Bank for Reconstruction and Development (IBRD)
- International Committee of the Red Cross (ICRC)
- International Criminal Police Organization (Interpol)
- International Energy Agency (IEA)
- International Finance Corporation (IFC)
- International Fund for Agricultural Development (IFAD)
- International Hydrographic Organization (IHO)
- International Labour Organization (ILO)
- International Olympic Committee (IOC)
- International Organization for Migration (IOM)
- International Red Cross and Red Crescent Movement (ICRM)
- International Telecommunication Union (ITU)
- International Telecommunications Satellite Organization (ITSO)
- Inter-Parliamentary Union (IPU)
- Organisation internationale de la Francophonie (OIF)
- United Nations (UN)
- United Nations Environment Program (UNEP)
- United Nations High Commissioner for Refugees (UNHCR)
- United Nations University (UNU)
- World Confederation of Labour (WCL)
- World Federation of Trade Unions (WFTU)
- World Food Programme (WFP)
- World Health Organization (WHO)
- World Intellectual Property Organization (WIPO)
- World Tourism Organization (UNWTO)

=== Law and order in Burundi ===
- Constitution of Burundi
- Human rights in Burundi
  - LGBT rights in Burundi
  - Freedom of religion in Burundi
  - Polygamy in Burundi
- Law enforcement in Burundi
  - Ministry of Public Security of Burundi

=== Military of Burundi ===
Military of Burundi

- Command
  - Commander-in-chief:
- Forces
  - Army of Burundi
  - Navy of Burundi
  - Air Force of Burundi

=== Local government in Burundi ===
Local government in Burundi

- List of Burundian provincial governors

== History of Burundi ==
- Current events of Burundi

=== By period ===
- Kingdom of Burundi
  - Burundian monarchy
  - List of kings of Burundi
    - Karyenda
    - Mutaga IV Mbikije of Burundi
    - Mwambutsa I Mbariza
    - Mwambutsa IV Bangiriceng of Burundi
    - Mwami
    - Mwami Mutaga III Senyamwiza Mutamo
    - Mwezi III Ndagushimiye of Burundi
    - Mwezi IV Gisabo of Burundi
    - Ntare I Kivimira Savuyimba Semunganzashamba Rushatsi Cambarantama
    - Ntare IV Rutaganzwa Rugamba
    - Ntare V
- Burundi Colonial Period
  - German East Africa
    - German East African rupie
    - Colonial heads of Burundi
  - Ruanda-Urundi
    - Colonial heads of Burundi (Ruanda-Urundi)
    - Colonial heads of Burundi (Urundi)
- League of Nations Class B Mandate
- United Nations Trust Territory#Former German Schutzgebiete
- Burundi independence
  - Martyazo
    - Heads of state of Martyazo
  - Burundi Civil War
    - Itaba massacre
    - United Nations Security Council Resolution 1375
    - United Nations Security Council Resolution 1286
    - Titanic Express massacre
    - Gatumba massacre
  - United Nations Operation in Burundi
    - United Nations Security Council Resolution 1545
    - United Nations Security Council Resolution 1577
    - United Nations Security Council Resolution 1602
    - United Nations Security Council Resolution 1606
  - Burundian constitutional referendum, 2005

=== By subject ===
- 1972 Burundi Genocide
- 1993 ethnic violence in Burundi
- History of rail transport in Burundi
- Union for National Progress
- Front for Democracy in Burundi
- National Council for the Defense of Democracy-Forces for the Defense of Democracy
- National Forces of Liberation
- National Congress for Liberty

=== Conflicts in which Burundi was involved ===
- Second Congo War
- Kivu Conflict
- Democratic Republic of the Congo–Rwanda conflict (2022–present)
- M23 campaign (2022–present)

== Culture of Burundi ==

Burundian Amahoro dance crew at Dzaleka Refugee Camp

- Cuisine of Burundi
- Languages of Burundi
  - Rundi language
- Media of Burundi
- National symbols of Burundi
  - Coat of arms of Burundi
  - Flag of Burundi
  - National anthem of Burundi: Burundi Bwacu
    - Karyenda
- Public holidays in Burundi
- Scouting and Guiding in Burundi
- World Heritage Sites in Burundi: none

=== Art in Burundi ===
- Music of Burundi
  - Karyenda
  - Master Drummers of Burundi
  - Royal Drummers of Burundi
  - Ikembe
  - Umuduri
  - Inanga
  - List of Burundian musicians
    - Jean-Pierre Nimbona
    - Khadja Nin
    - Miss Erica
    - Masterland
    - Sat-B
    - Spoks Man
    - J.P. Bimeni
    - Chelsea Muco
    - DJ Ira
    - Happy Famba
- Television in Burundi
- Burundian TV presenters
  - Katja Mia
- Actors from Burundi
  - Celeste O'Connor
  - Léonce Ngabo
  - Consolate Sipérius
  - Michel-Ange Nzojibwami
  - Vénuste Maronko
  - Seba Johnson

=== People of Burundi ===
- People of Burundi

==== Ethnic groups in Burundi ====
- Ethnic groups in Burundi
  - Hutu
    - List of Hutus
  - Tutsi
    - List of Tutsis
  - Great Lakes Twa

===== African Pygmies =====
- Aka people
- Baka people (Cameroon and Gabon)
- Ota Benga
- Efé people
- Pygmy
- Pygmy music
- Twa peoples

====== Pygmy mythology ======
- Bambuti mythology
- Khonvoum

=== Religion in Burundi ===
- Religion in Burundi
  - Christianity in Burundi
    - Anglican Church of Burundi
    - Roman Catholicism in Burundi
      - Apostolic Nuncio to Burundi
      - List of Roman Catholic dioceses in Burundi
  - Islam in Burundi

=== Sports in Burundi ===
- Football in Burundi
  - Burundi national football team
  - Burundi Premier League
  - Football Federation of Burundi
  - List of football clubs in Burundi
  - Burundian footballers
    - Shabani Nonda
    - David Opango
    - Mohammed Tchité
    - Saido Berahino
    - Youssouf Ndayishimiye
    - Marco Weymans
    - Gaël Bigirimana
    - Saidi Ntibazonkiza
  - Football venues in Burundi
    - Prince Louis Rwagasore Stadium
- Rugby Union in Burundi
  - Burundi national rugby union team
- Burundi at the Olympics
  - Burundi at the 1996 Summer Olympics
  - Burundi at the 2000 Summer Olympics
  - Burundi at the 2004 Summer Olympics
  - Burundi at the 2008 Summer Olympics

==== Burundian athletes ====
- Arthémon Hatungimana
- Dieudonné Kwizera
- Jean-Patrick Nduwimana
- Vénuste Niyongabo
- Charles Nkazamyampi
- Francine Niyonsaba
- Francine Niyonizigiye
- Elvanie Nimbona

===== Olympic competitors for Burundi =====
- Arthémon Hatungimana
- Jean-Patrick Nduwimana
- Vénuste Niyongabo
- Charles Nkazamyampi
- Francine Niyonsaba

== Economy and infrastructure of Burundi ==
- Economic rank, by nominal GDP (2026): 158th (one hundred and fifty eighth)
  - One of the ten poorest countries in the world.
  - Has the lowest per capita GDP of any nation in the world.
- Agriculture in Burundi
- Banking in Burundi
  - National bank of Burundi: Bank of the Republic of Burundi
  - List of banks in Burundi
- Communications in Burundi
  - Media of Burundi
    - Internet in Burundi
      - .bi
    - Telephone service in Burundi
      - AfricaPhonebook/Annulaires Afrique
      - Telephone numbers in Burundi
  - Postal service in Burundi
- Companies of Burundi
- Currency of Burundi: Franc
  - ISO 4217: BIF
- Energy in Burundi
- Health care in Burundi
- Mining in Burundi
- Tourism in Burundi
  - Visa policy of Burundi
- Trade unions in Burundi
  - Confederation of Trade Unions of Burundi
  - Trade Union Confederation of Burundi
- Transportation in Burundi
  - Air transport in Burundi
    - Air Burundi
    - Airports in Burundi
      - Bujumbura International Airport
  - Rail transport in Burundi

== Education in Burundi ==
Education in Burundi

- University of Burundi
- Hope Africa University

== Health in Burundi ==
- Health in Burundi
  - Kira Hospital
  - Village Health Works
    - Kigutu Hospital
  - Kamenge University Hospital
  - Kamenge Military Hospital
  - Bumerec Hospital
  - Centre Medico-Chirurgical de Kinindo
  - Burundi Medical and Research Center
  - Tanganyika Care Polyclinic
  - Prince Regent Charles Hospital
  - Polyclinique Centrale de Bujumbura
  - Natwe Turashoboye Hospital
  - Gitega Regional Hospital
  - Mpanda Hospital

== See also ==
Burundi

- List of Burundi-related topics
- List of international rankings
- Member state of the United Nations
- Outline of Africa
- Outline of geography
