= Health in Burundi =

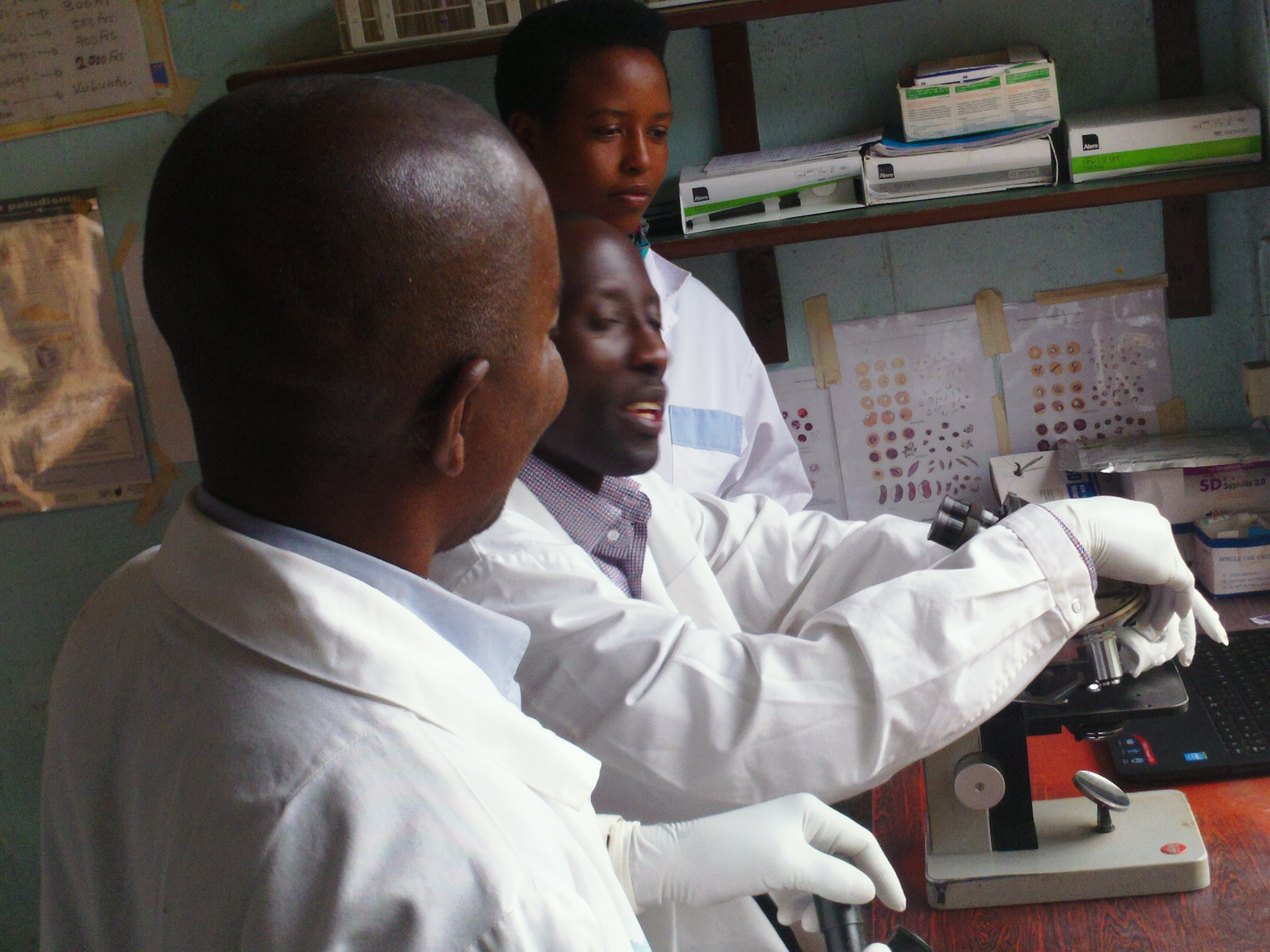
Improving health in Burundi.

Burundi is one of the poorest countries in the world, with a population of 14.4 million people as of 2025. Generally, there have been some improvements in the key health indicators such as life expectancy, child mortality and maternal mortality over the last fifty years. According to UNWPP, the life expectancy of Burundi has gradually increased from 40.9 years in 1950 to 63.7 years in 2023. Despite the improvement in life expectancy, it remains below the current world average of 73.2 years. Over the past forty years, the maternal mortality rate has greatly reduced from 1428 deaths per 100000 live births in 1985 to 392 deaths per 100000 live births in 2023. However, this maternal mortality rate is two times higher than the world average of 197 deaths per 100,000 live births. In addition, child mortality has also declined gradually in the last 20 years from 170 deaths per 1000 live births in 1995 to 49 per 1000 live births in 2023. The total fertility rate of Burundi reduced from 7.0 births per woman in 1960 to 4.9 births per woman in 2022, though it remains higher than the global average. The low life expectancy and high child mortality rate, and high fertility rate in Burundi, indicate that the overall health status of the country is generally poor.

Civilians in Burundi have lived through years of conflict due to the civil war, leaving many civilians facing economic crisis. The government has had limited capacity to invest in the health system, so the health infrastructure is poor. The link between health and poverty is undeniable. Many Burundians do not have access to primary health care. Despite this, the Human Rights Measurement Initiative finds that Burundi is fulfilling what it should be for the right to health based on income levels. Burundi had the lowest consumption of antibiotics of any country in the world in 2015 with a rate of 4.4 defined daily doses per 1,000 inhabitants per day.

== Health status ==
As of 2019, the average life expectancy in Burundi is estimated at 62 years, up from 49 years in 2000.

=== Life expectancy in Burundi ===
1	Low life expectancy	About 62 years
2	Food insecurity	Lack of proper nutrition
3	Long term effects of malnutrition on children	Underweight children
4	Low sources	The population expected to double in 2050
5	Low reproductive health services	Lack of contraceptives, no family planning program
6	Poverty	Vast majority of people live on less than $3.10 per day
7	HIV/AIDS	84000 of people were living with this disease in 2016, most of them are sex workers and men who have sex with men, increased condom uses and antiretroviral therapy
8	Other infectious diseases	Malaria, typhoid fever, hepatitis A, measles
9	Environmental issues	Floods, droughts, landslides
10	Life expectancy is increasing	However, it is increasing, this is lower than other countries like USA

== Burden of disease ==
=== Disability adjusted life years (DALYs) ===
In 2021, the leading five causes of DALYs per 100,000 of the population in Burundi for both sexes, of all ages, were neglected tropical diseases (NTDs) & malaria, maternal and neonatal diseases, respiratory infections and tuberculosis, cardiovascular diseases and enteric infections.

=== Child mortality (under 5 years) ===
The under-5 mortality rate in Burundi is 1.6 times higher than that WHO has estimated for the African region. As this list illustrates maternal and neonatal disorders are the first causes of DALYs but the death rate decreased from 100 deaths per 1000 live births in1996 to 80 deaths in 2016.

These deaths have various causes but they have not been measured directly for each age group and gender. Research has shown that there are 3 main reasons for the hospitalization of children under 5 years. About 93% of all children aged 1 to 59 months old were hospitalized due to malaria, lung disease, or acute diarrhea. The malaria ratio was about 63%; this is why malaria is the main cause of death and hospitalization among children under five in Burundi.

Various causes are playing a role in reducing the under-5 mortality rate. The government implemented a pilot program to increase deliveries in hospitals and reclaim the quality of antenatal care. Experienced nurses and skilled birth attendants can prevent maternal and neonatal deaths. Between the years 2004 and 2008 the proportion of children who were delivered in health facilities by qualified staff increased from 76% to 94%.

=== HIV/AIDS ===
Jeanne Gapiya-Niyonzima was the first person from the country to publicly admit they had HIV. She founded the National Association of Support for Seropositive and AIDS Patients (ANSS). It was the first civil organisation in the country to provide support and treatment, including anti-retroviral therapy, for people with HIV and AIDS within the country.

== Health policies ==
=== Abortion ===
Abortion in Burundi is only legal if the abortion will save the woman's life or if the pregnancy gravely endangers the woman's physical, or potentially mental, health. In Burundi, two certified physicians must agree that the pregnancy is threatened before providing medical assistance. Even in cases in which a practitioner has deemed that the pregnancy has endangered the woman, both the physician and woman may be subject to prison time and fines.

== Hospitals ==
There are 3 regional hospitals, 15 provincial hospitals, 33 district hospitals, and 509 health centers in Burundi. Notable hospitals include:

- Bumerec Hospital
- Bururi Hospital in Bururi Province
- Clinic Prince Louis Rwagasore
- Gitega Hospital (Gitega province, central Burundi)
- Karuzi Hospital
- KIRA Hospital
- Matana Hospitals in Bururi Province
- Muramvya Hospital (Muramvya province, central Burundi)
- Muyinga Hospital
- Ngozi Hospital (Ngozi Province, northern Burundi)
- Polyclinic Central
- Prince Louis Rwagasore Clinic in Bujumbura
- Prince Regent Charles Hospital in Bujumbura, established in 1949
- Roi Khaled Hospital (the Centre Hospitalo – Universitaire de Kamenge) in Bujumbura
- Rumonge Hospital in Bururi Province

== See also ==
- COVID-19 pandemic in Burundi
- List of Hospitals in Burundi
