= Rundi =

Rundi may refer to:

- Rundi language, the language of Burundi, commonly known as Kirundi
- Rundi people, the people of Burundi. For specific information see:
  - Demographics of Burundi
  - Culture of Burundi
  - List of Burundians
