= Barundi (disambiguation) =

Barundi are the people of Burundi, or of Burundian descent.

Barundi may refer to:

== Burundi ==
- Burundi
  - Demographics of Burundi
  - Culture of Burundi
  - List of Burundians

== Other uses ==
- Barundi, Punjab, a village in the Ludhiana district of the state of Punjab in India.
