= Burundian =

Burundian may refer to:

- Something of, from, or related to the country of Burundi
- A person from Burundi, or of Burundian descent. For information about the Burundian people, see Demographics of Burundi and Culture of Burundi. For specific Burundians, see List of Burundians.
- Note that the Burundian language is called Rundi or Kirundi
