= United Nations Security Council Resolution 1602 =

UN Security Council Resolution 1602
- Flag of Burundi
- Date: 31 May 2005
- Meeting no.: 5,193
- Code: S/RES/1602 (Document)
- Subject: The situation in Burundi
- Voting summary: 15 voted for; None voted against; None abstained
- Result: Adopted

Security Council composition
- Permanent members: China; France; Russia; United Kingdom; United States
- Non-permanent members: Algeria; Argentina; Benin; Brazil; Denmark; Greece; Japan; Philippines; Romania; Tanzania

United Nations Security Council resolution 1602, adopted unanimously on 31 May 2005, after recalling resolutions 1545 (2004), 1565 (2004), 1577 (2004) and 1596 (2005) on the situation in Burundi, the Council extended the mandate of the United Nations Operation in Burundi (ONUB) for a period of six months until 1 December 2005.

== Resolution ==
=== Observations ===
The Security Council reiterated its support for the Peace and Reconciliation Agreement signed in Arusha in 2000, calling on the relevant parties to honour their commitments under the agreement. It highlighted positive developments that had taken place since the ONUB mission was deployed, including the approval of a constitution in a referendum and the signing of a peace agreement between President Domitien Ndayizeye and leader of the Palipehutu-FNL rebel group. Furthermore, the imminent holding of elections was welcomed, along with reform of the security sector, and the greater participation of women in politics was encouraged.

Meanwhile, all violence, violations of human rights and the massacre of civilians at Gatumba were condemned. The Council considered that ending impunity was essential for bringing peace to the African Great Lakes region.

=== Acts ===
Acting under Chapter VII of the United Nations Charter, the Council called on Burundian parties to ensure the stability of the country through the transitional period and national reconciliation. It awaited a report of the Secretary-General Kofi Annan's report concerning the role of the United Nations and Burundi and how it could support the peace process, including a possible restructuring of ONUB's mandate and strength. Additionally, the Council looked forward to the Secretary General's proposal to establish a post-transitional support mechanism in Burundi.

Finally, the Security Council welcomed ONUB's attempts to implement the zero-tolerance sexual exploitation policy, and the Secretary-General was asked to report on the situation in Burundi at regular intervals.

== See also ==
- Burundi Civil War
- List of United Nations Security Council Resolutions 1601 to 1700 (2005–2006)
- United Nations Integrated Office in Burundi
