= Burundi National Radio and Television =

Publicly funded broadcaster of Burundi

Radio Télévision Nationale du Burundi
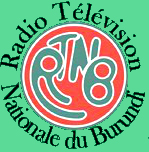
- RTNB logo
- Country: Burundi
- Broadcast area: National
- Headquarters: 12 Avenue du 13 Octobre, Bujumbura, Burundi

Programming
- Languages: English, French, Kiswahili (also known as Swahili), and Kirundi
- Picture format: 1080i HDTV (downscaled to 4:3 480i pan and scan for SDTVs)

Ownership
- Owner: Government of Burundi
- Key people: Faustin Ndayizeye (Director-General); Séverin Wakarerwa (Administrative and Financial Director); Innocent Niyonkuru (Technical Director); Jonas Ndikumuremyi (Director of the National Television); Prosper Ngabirano (Director of the National Radio)
- Sister channels: Chaine 1 Chaine 2

History
- Launched: 5 October 1975; 51 years ago

Links
- Website: www.rtnb.bi

Burundi National Radio and Television, also known as the National Radio and Television of Burundi or Radio Television National of Burundi (French: La Radio Télévision Nationale du Burundi (RTNB)), is the national broadcaster of Burundi. It currently broadcasts in Kirundi, French, Swahili (also known as Kiswahili), and English.

== History and idents ==
=== History ===
Burundi National Radio and Television began broadcasting in 1960 with the launch of Radio Burundi when the country was still part of a Belgian colony. Television broadcasting only began in 1984, long after Burundi gained independence. The television station uses a 0.5kW transmitter in Bujumbura on UHF channel 25. Among its founding staff was Rwandan-born Valence Rwamukwaya, who worked for Burundi's national radio for two years, beginning in 1982.

Television transmissions began in 1984; as of 1997, it was reported to broadcast on a VHF transmitter on Mount Manga on channel 8, while the transmitter for Bujumbura proper was a UHF one, on channel 25.

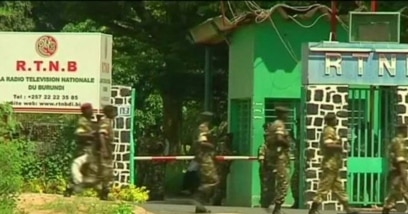
Photograph of RTNB's office in Bujumbura taken in 2015

RTNB operates two radio stations and one television channel, broadcasting news, cultural programmes, and entertainment.

In June 2013, Burundi began transitioning from analogue to digital television, intending to complete the process by the end of 2014. However, the migration was delayed due to the 2015 Burundian unrest. President Pierre Nkurunziza officially launched digital broadcasting in December 2016, starting with Bujumbura and gradually expanding nationwide. RTNB appointed a new general director in August 2016. On 23 April 2017, RTNB lost its employee in a traffic accident. RTNB completed the digital migration later in 2017, though as of mid‑2023, the system remained not fully operational.

=== Idents ===
There are two known idents of the station. The first, used from 2008 to 2017, contains a mountain landscape background with the Burundian flag displayed inside the text RTNB at the centre of the screen. The second, introduced after 2017, includes the day's broadcast program. An example of a typical broadcast schedule would list Amakuru, Journal, News, next program, advertisement, special documentaries and idents.

== Popularity ==
The television series Ninde is broadcast by RTNB across Burundi. The show began in 1980 without a formal title. A few years later, RTNB named it Ninde. Following the launch of television broadcasting in 1984, RTNB began airing Ninde on television.

As of 2024, RTNB broadcasts four radio and two television programmes, including Ninde and Burundi Bwacu.

== Channels ==
RTNB is divided into two radio stations and one television.

=== Television channels ===
- RTNB is the first and main channel.

=== Radio channels ===
There are two RTNB radio channels including:

- Chaine 1: main radio station that broadcasts news, cultural programmes, and public service announcements.
- Chaine 2: second radio station that broadcasts news, music, and entertainment.

== Programmes ==
- News: English news
- Journal: French news
- Amakuru: Kirundi news
- Ninde? (English: Who is it?): Series (1984 to present)
- Burundi Bwacu: culture

== See also ==
- Media of Burundi
- 2015 Burundian unrest
- Communications in Burundi
- List of companies of Burundi
- Economy of Burundi
