= Climate of Burundi =

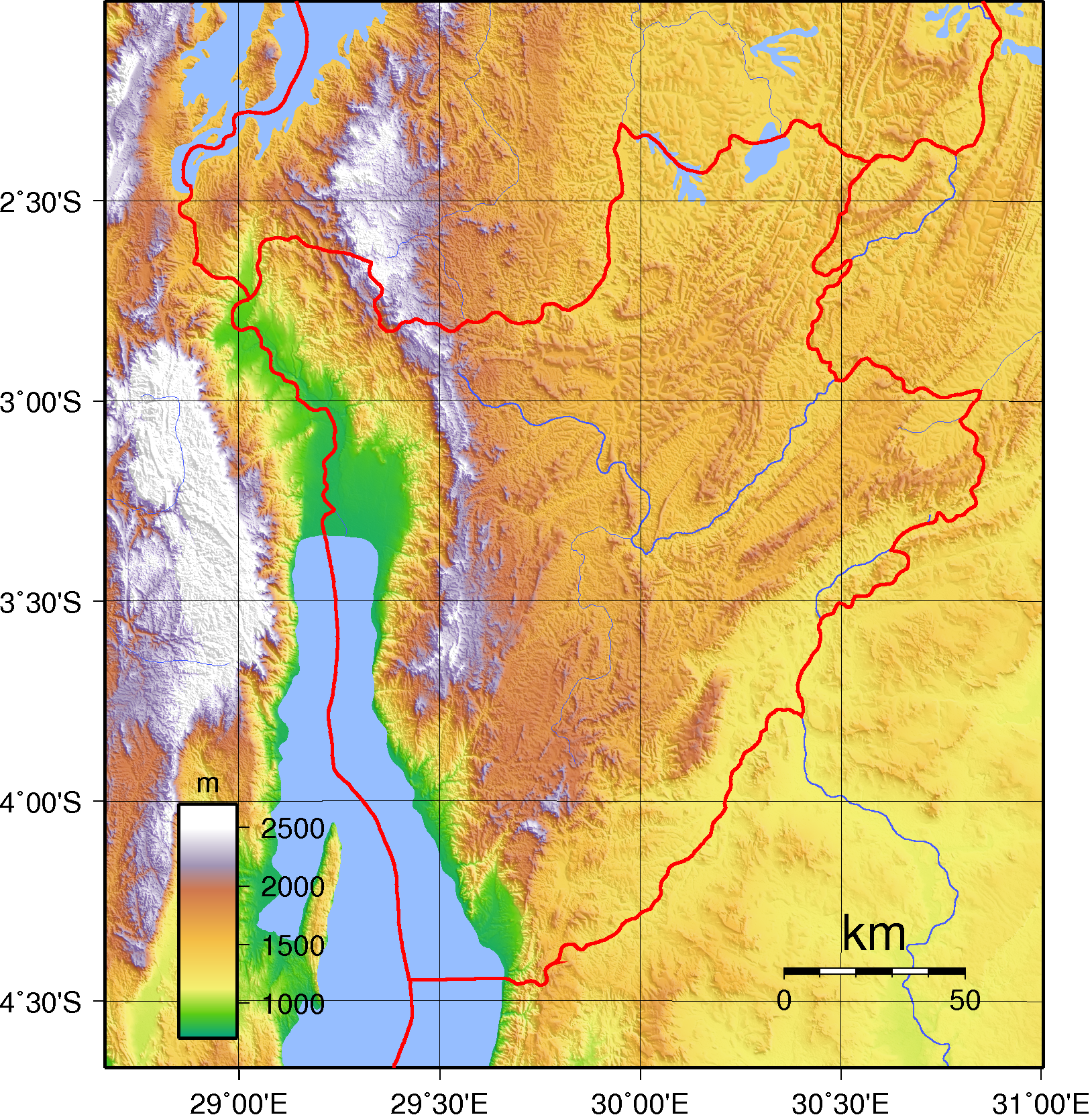
Topography of Burundi

The climate of Burundi is equatorial in nature, and is marked by high mean annual temperatures, small temperature ranges, and rainfall throughout the year. Despite this, there is still considerable daily variation in temperature and rainfall across the country, depending on altitude.

Burundi is located on the Albertine Rift, the western extension of the East African Rift. Altitudes in the country vary between 775 metres or 2,543 feet at Lake Tanganyika to 2,684 metres or 8,806 feet at Mount Heha. Burundi's generally high elevation produces relatively mild temperatures, with an average temperature of 21 °C or 70 °F throughout the year in the central plateau. At lower areas, such as the capital, Bujumbura, and Lake Tanganyika, the average annual temperature increases slightly, to 23 °C or 73 °F; while at higher altitudes, it decreases to 16 °C or 61 °F.

Burundi experiences its dry season between May and August, with a shorter dry season also occurring between January and February. Its rainy season occurs between February and May, and September to November. Annual precipitation stands at between 1,500 and 1,800 millimetres (60 and 70 in) in high-elevation areas, though it drops to 1,000 millimetres or 40 inches on the shores of Lake Tanganyika and various depressions. The rainiest part of the country is the north-east; rainfall in higher areas can be almost double that of what is found on lower ground. As a result of its rainfall, agriculture in Burundi — which employs between 80% and 90% of the country's workforce — is heavily reliant upon rain-fed crop production.

Burundi's mild climate and adequate rainfall makes it a suitable location for intensive agriculture, though the impact of climate change is making rainfall less predictable. Burundi has experienced alternating cycles of excess and deficit rainfall in nearly every decade since the 1950s. This has included severe floods in 2006 and 2007, and droughts from 1999 to 2000, and in 2005. Burundi has been identified as one of six African countries considered to be highly vulnerable to droughts.
