= Deogratias Niyizonkiza =

Burundian-born American

- Born: Burundi
- Education: Columbia University (BA); Harvard University (MPH); Geisel School of Medicine at Dartmouth (MD)

Deogratias "Deo" Niyizonkiza is a Burundian-born American who founded and leads the organization Village Health Works in Kigutu, Burundi. He is also the subject of Tracy Kidder's 2009 book, Strength in What Remains. Niyizonkiza escaped the Burundi's Civil War in the 1990s, arrived in New York city, became homeless and was eventually taken in by an American couple who helped support his education at Columbia University. He began working for Partners in Health and has worked in Burundi and Rwanda. He started a health clinic in his parents' community in Burundi which he continues to lead.

Niyizonkiza has been the recipient of several awards, including the 2016 Carnegie Corporation of New York Great Immigrants.
