= Jeanne Gapiya-Niyonzima =

Burundian human rights activist

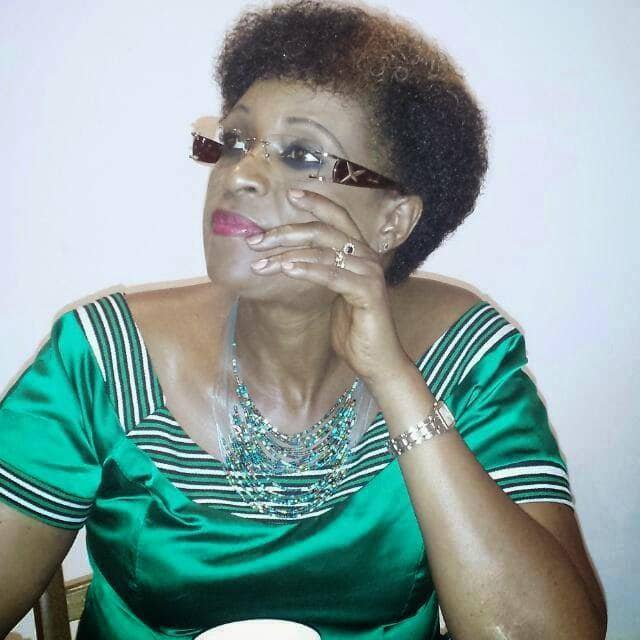
- Born: 12 July 1963 (age 63); Bujumbura, Burundi
- Occupation: Human rights activist
- Known for: First person in Burundi to publicly declare their HIV-positive status
- Spouse(s): First husband (m. 1987; died 1989) Second husband (m. 1999)
- Children: 3 (including 1 deceased)
- Awards: World Food Programme Prize (2003); Sidaction International Prize (2006); Human Rights Prize of the French Republic (2012); Burundian Woman of Courage (2012)

Jeanne Gapiya-Niyonzima (born 12 July 1963, in Bujumbura) is a human rights activist from Burundi. She is the chair and founder of the National Association for Support for HIV-Positive People with AIDS (ANSS) and was the first person from the country to publicly state they had HIV.

== Biography ==
Gapiya-Niyonzima trained as an accountant initially, but found her first employment at a pharmacy in Burundi's capital city.

In 1987, she married her husband and in 1988 when she was pregnant with her second child, her first child was diagnosed as HIV positive. At her doctor's insistence her pregnancy was terminated, and she was also diagnosed as HIV positive. Her first child died aged eighteen months; her husband died of AIDS soon after in 1989. In 1993 after the death of her sister and brother, she tested positive for HIV.

In 1994, Gapiya-Niyonzima became the first person from Burundi to publicly declare that they were HIV positive. This happened during a religious service, in which a sermon was delivered which stigmatised people with the disease.

=== Activism ===
In 1993, Gapiya-Niyonzima founded the National Association of Support for Seropositive and AIDS Patients (ANSS). It was the first civil organisation in the country to provide support and treatment, including anti-retroviral therapy, for people with HIV and AIDS within the country. The ANSS promotes the prevention of the transmission of HIV/AIDS and provides support for those with the infection, however it was transmitted, and their families.

In 1996, whilst Burundi was under a trade embargo, Gapiya-Niyonzima fought for the right of patients to continue to access medicines, which were being sold at exorbitant prices. In 1999 she established the Turinho centre within the ANSS which provides overall support and care for those infected and affected.

In April 2011 Gapiya-Niyonzima addressed the United Nations Committee for HIV/AIDS in New York City. Since 2013, with the support of UNITAID, the ANSS has run a laboratory which performs its own viral loads tests. Between August 2014 and November 2016, the laboratory performed 14,800 HIV viral load tests for patients on anti-retrovirals. From 2013 to 2016, the ANSS performed 85% of the viral load tests carried out in Burundi.

In 2016, Gapiya-Niyonzima was re-elected as president of the ANSS by its General Assembly. The ANSS had at that time 6,410 members, 5,114 of whom take antiretroviral medicines. She is also a board member for other NGOs active in anti-discrimination organisations, including Coalition Plus and Sidaction.

=== Awards ===
- 2012 : Prize of Human Rights of the French Republic.
- 2012: Elected Burundian Woman of Courage of the Year 2012 by the Government of the United States of America.
- 2006: Sidaction International Prize.
- 2003: World Food Program Prize for having “mobilized and influenced young people in secondary schools, women's leagues, the media and the authorities to fight against HIV / AIDS”.

== Family ==
Gapiya-Niyonzima remarried in 1999 and she has two children.
