= List of rulers of Burundi =

This is a list of rulers and office-holders in Burundi.

== Heads of state ==
- Kings of Burundi
- Presidents of Burundi
- Vice-Presidents of Burundi

== Colonial governors ==
- Provincial governors of Burundi
- Colonial heads of Burundi
- Colonial heads of Burundi (Urundi)
- Colonial heads of Burundi (Ruanda-Urundi)

== See also ==
- Lists of office-holders
