= Polyclinique Centrale de Bujumbura =

Hospital in Bujumbura

Geography
- Location: Bujumbura, Bujumbura Mairie Province, Burundi
- Coordinates: 3.38040°S 29.36881°E

Organisation
- Care system: Private

Links
- Lists: Hospitals in Burundi

Polyclinique Centrale de Bujumbura (Polyceb) is a private hospital located in Bujumbura, Burundi.

== Location ==
The Polyclinique Centrale de Bujumbura is in the center of Bujumbara, on the north side of the Boulevard de l'Uprona. It is opposite the Orthodox Church, and to the west of Avenue Mosso. The clinic is one of the oldest in the capital.

== History ==
During the 2015 political crisis in Burundi when the president sought a third term of office, the clinic experienced a drop of revenues for outpatient consultations and hospitalizations of over 40%. It was forced to reduce service levels in response.

In May 2020 Polyceb was one of the four hospitals holding patients suspected of COVID-19. Others were BUMEREC, HPRC and the UN hospital. At this stage, 19 people had been identified with the virus in Burundi.

== Sources ==
- "Burundi announces four new COVID-19 infections", Burundi Times, 2 May 2020
- "Les hôpitaux privés très affectés par la crise", Isanganiro (in French), 31 August 2015
- "Polyclinique Centrale De Bujumbura (Polyceb)", Petit Fute
- "Way: Polyclinique Centrale de Bujumbura (996803956)", OpenStreetMap
