= Geography of Burundi =

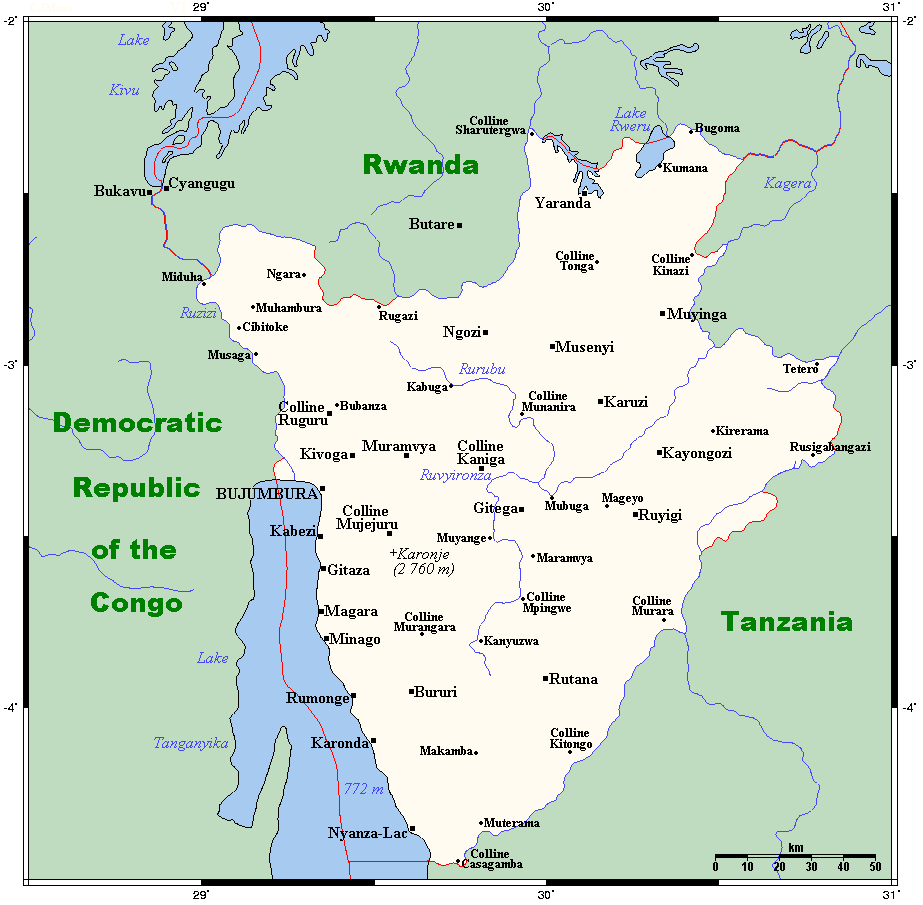
- Continent: Africa
- Region: East Africa
- Coordinates: 3°30′S 30°0′E
- Area: Ranked 142nd
  - Total: 27,830 km^{2} (10,750 sq mi)
  - Land: 92.2%
  - Water: 7.8%
- Coastline: 0 km (0 mi)
- Borders: 1,140 km (DRC 236 km, Rwanda 315 km, Tanzania 589 km)
- Highest point: Mount Heha 2684 m
- Lowest point: Lake Tanganyika 772 m
- Longest river: Ruvubu 300 km
- Largest lake: Lake Tanganyika

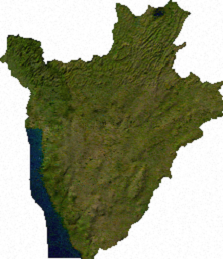
Satellite image of Burundi

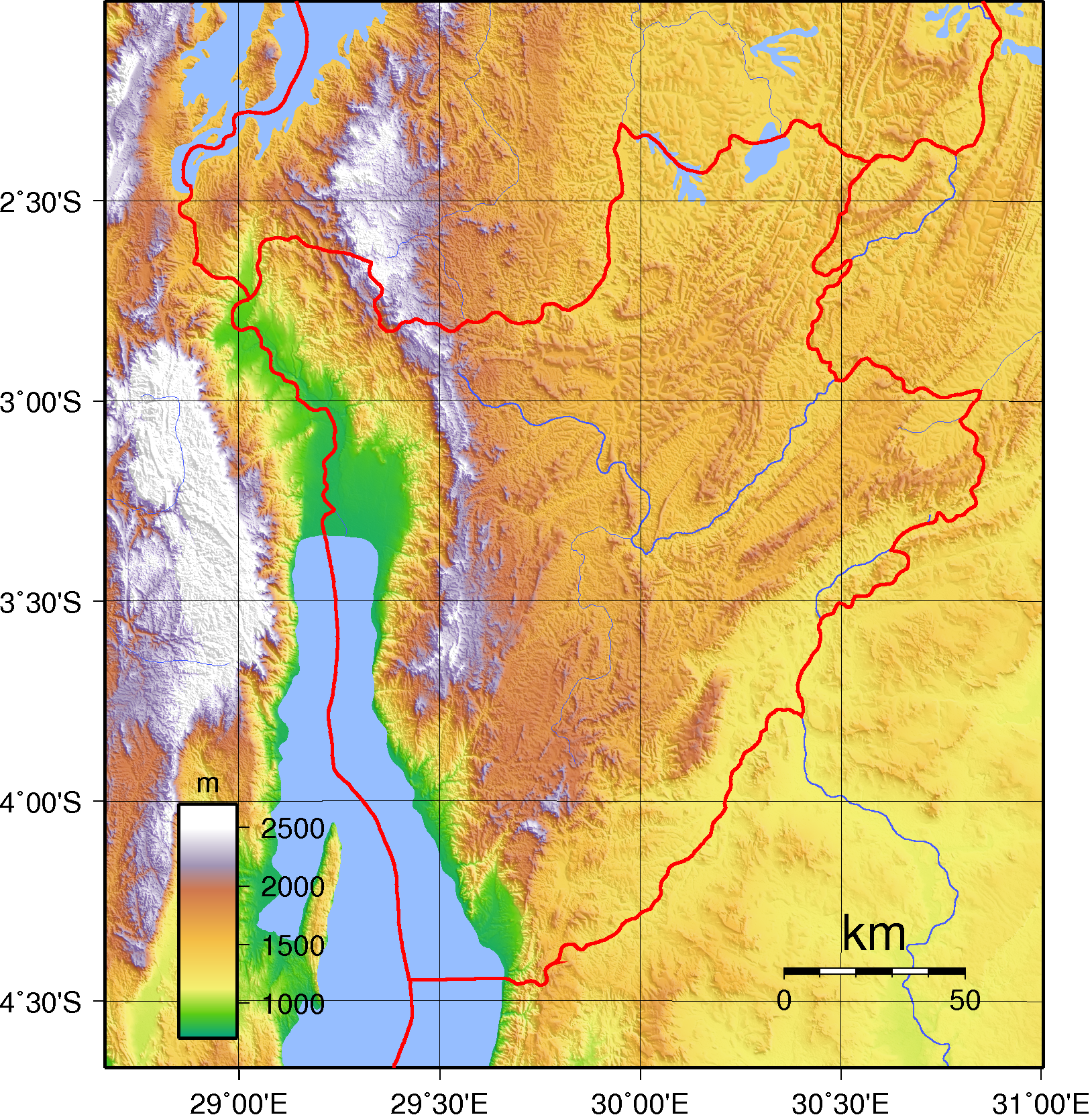
Topography of Burundi

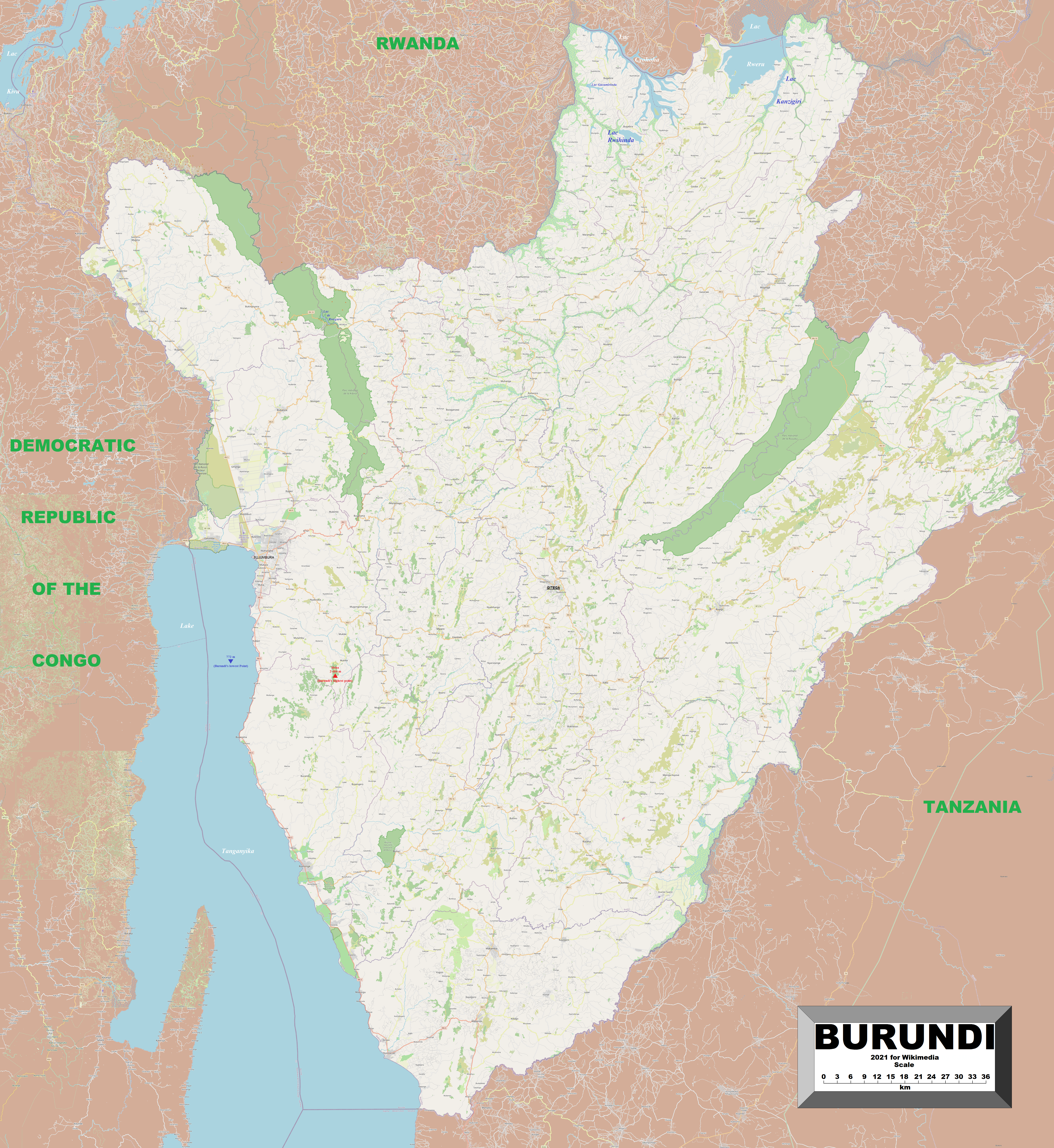
Enlargeable, detailed map of Burundi

State of Burundi

Burundi is located in East Africa, to the east of the Democratic Republic of the Congo, at the coordinates 3°30′S 30°0′E.

== Physical geography ==
Burundi occupies an area equal to 27,830 square kilometres (10,750 sq mi) in size, of which 25,680 square kilometres (9,920 sq mi) is land. The country has 1,140 kilometres (710 mi) of land border: 236 kilometres (147 mi) of which is shared with the Democratic Republic of the Congo, 315 kilometres (196 mi) with Rwanda and 589 kilometres (366 mi) with Tanzania. As a landlocked country, Burundi possesses no coastline. It straddles the crest of the Congo–Nile Divide which separates the basins of the Congo and Nile rivers. The farthest headwaters of the Nile, the Ruvyironza River, has its source in Burundi.

=== Terrain ===
The terrain of Burundi is hilly and mountainous, dropping to a plateau in the east. The southern and eastern plains have been categorised by the World Wide Fund for Nature as part of the Central Zambezian miombo woodlands ecoregion.

The lowest point in the country is at Lake Tanganyika, at 772 metres (2,533 ft), with the highest point being on Mount Heha, at 2,684 metres (8,806 ft). Natural hazards are posed in Burundi by flooding and landslides.

=== Forests ===
In Burundi forest cover is around 11% of the total land area, equivalent to 279,640 hectares (691,000 acres) of forest in 2020, up from 276,480 hectares (683,200 acres) in 1990. In 2020, naturally regenerating forest covered 166,670 hectares (411,900 acres) and planted forest covered 112,970 hectares (279,200 acres). Of the naturally regenerating forest 23% was reported to be primary forest (consisting of native tree species with no clearly visible indications of human activity) and around 41% of the forest area was found within protected areas. For the year 2015, 100% of the forest area was reported to be under public ownership.

=== Natural resources ===
Burundi possesses reserves of: nickel, uranium, rare earth oxides, peat, cobalt, copper, platinum (not yet exploited), vanadium, niobium, tantalum, gold, tin, tungsten, kaolin, and limestone. There is also arable land and the potential for hydropower. Burundi has 214.3 square kilometres (82.7 sq mi) of land that is irrigated. The table below describes land use in Burundi.

Land use
Use	Percentage of Area
arable land	42.83
permanent crops	13.63
other	43.54

== Climate ==
The climate of Burundi is equatorial in nature and is marked by high mean annual temperatures, small temperature ranges, and rainfall throughout the year. The temperature and amount of rainfall varies dependent upon altitude. Burundi experiences its dry season between May and August, and its rainy season between February and May. Due to climate change, Burundi is becoming more susceptible to both excess and deficit rainfall, leading alternately to floods and droughts.

== Environment ==
=== Current issues ===
In Burundi, soil erosion poses a significant challenge, exacerbated by overgrazing and the expansion of agriculture into marginal lands. This problem is compounded by other environmental issues such as deforestation, driven by the uncontrolled cutting of trees for fuel, and habitat loss, which severely threatens wildlife populations. The cumulative effect of these issues not only degrades the environment but also undermines the agricultural productivity that is crucial for the country's economy and food security. The "Adapting to Climate Change in the Lake Victoria Basin" project, initiated by the United Nations Environment Programme (UNEP) and funded by the Adaptation Fund, addresses these interconnected concerns. By promoting nature-based solutions like reforestation and the construction of terraces, the project helps stabilize the soil and improve water retention, which mitigates the impact of soil erosion. Additionally, the introduction of sustainable practices such as the eco-friendly fish-drying kiln helps reduce the dependence on wood for fuel, thereby curbing deforestation. This comprehensive approach not only aims to enhance environmental resilience but also supports sustainable development by preserving natural habitats and promoting the sustainable use of resources, thereby securing the livelihoods of local communities against the backdrop of climate change.

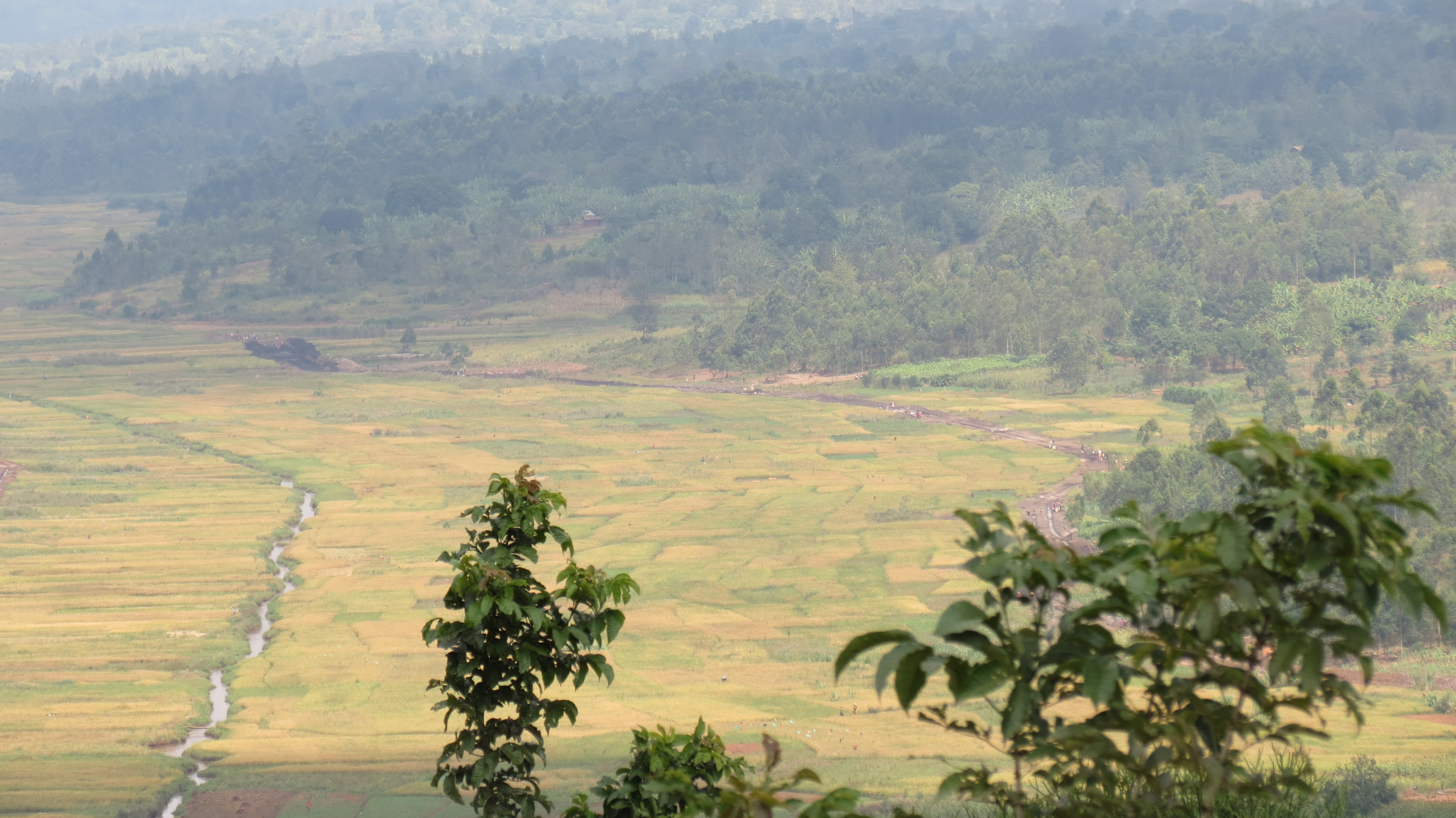
Plateau of Burundi

=== International agreements ===
Burundi is a party to the following international agreements that relate to the environment: Biodiversity, Climate Change, Desertification, Endangered Species, Hazardous Wastes and Ozone Layer Protection. The following have been signed but not yet ratified by Burundi: Law of the Sea and Nuclear Test Ban.

=== Tree cover extent and loss ===
Global Forest Watch publishes annual estimates of tree cover loss and 2000 tree cover extent derived from time-series analysis of Landsat satellite imagery in the Global Forest Change dataset. In this framework, tree cover refers to vegetation taller than 5 m (including natural forests and tree plantations), and tree cover loss is defined as the complete removal of tree cover canopy for a given year, regardless of cause.

For Burundi, country statistics report cumulative tree cover loss of 37,509 ha (375.09 km^{2}) from 2001 to 2024 (about 7.0% of its 2000 tree cover area). For tree cover density greater than 30%, country statistics report a 2000 tree cover extent of 537,671 ha (5,376.71 km^{2}). The charts and table below display this data. In simple terms, the annual loss number is the area where tree cover disappeared in that year, and the extent number shows what remains of the 2000 tree cover baseline after subtracting cumulative loss. Forest regrowth is not included in the dataset.

Annual tree cover loss in Burundi, 2001–2024. View chart definition.
Tree cover extent in 2000 minus cumulative tree cover loss in Burundi, 2001–2024 (loss-only residual; does not account for gain). View chart definition.

Annual tree cover extent and loss
Year	Tree cover extent (km2) (Note: This residual measure does not include forest regrowth.)	Annual tree cover loss (km2)
2001	5,362.54	14.17
2002	5,352.67	9.87
2003	5,339.41	13.26
2004	5,333.28	6.13
2005	5,323.43	9.85
2006	5,320.00	3.43
2007	5,301.39	18.61
2008	5,281.40	19.99
2009	5,272.57	8.83
2010	5,253.52	19.05
2011	5,243.92	9.60
2012	5,235.21	8.71
2013	5,221.15	14.06
2014	5,200.67	20.48
2015	5,186.09	14.58
2016	5,170.33	15.76
2017	5,152.58	17.75
2018	5,123.84	28.74
2019	5,099.97	23.87
2020	5,081.40	18.57
2021	5,058.68	22.72
2022	5,042.57	16.11
2023	5,023.05	19.52
2024	5,001.62	21.43

== Extreme points ==
This is a list of the extreme points of Burundi, the points that are farther north, south, east or west than any other location.

- Northernmost point – Muyinga Province; unnamed location on the border with Rwanda immediately south of the Rwandan town of Mbuye
- Easternmost point – Cankuzo Province; unnamed location on the border with Tanzania immediately northwest of Mburi hill
- Southernmost point – Makamba Province; unnamed location on the border with Tanzania immediately north of the Tanzanian town of Mwenene,
- Westernmost point – Cibitoke Province; unnamed location on the border the Democratic Republic of the Congo immediately east of the Congolese town of Kamanyola
