= Communications in Burundi =

Communications in Burundi include radio, television, fixed and mobile telephones, the Internet, and the postal service in Burundi.

== Radio and television ==
Radio is the main source of information for many Burundians.

- Radio stations:
  - La Radiodiffusion et Television Nationale de Burundi (RTNB), the state-controlled broadcaster operates the only national radio network, broadcasting in Kirundi, Swahili, French, and English; roughly 10 privately owned radio stations are operating; transmissions of several international broadcasters are available in the largest city, Bujumbura (2007).
  - No AM radio stations, four FM stations, and one shortwave station (2001).
  - Two AM stations, two FM stations, and no shortwave stations (1998).
- Radios: 440,000 radios in use (1997).
- Television stations:
  - La Radiodiffusion et Television Nationale de Burundi (RTNB), the state-controlled national network, broadcasting in Kirundi, Swahili, French, and English (2013); and
  - Tele Renaissance, a private station launched in 2008 (2013).
  - BeTV, a private television channel launched in 2017.
- Television sets: 25,000 sets in use (1997).

The BBC World Service broadcasts on 90.2 FM in the largest city and former capital, Bujumbura, and on 105.6 in Mount Manga; Radio France Internationale and the Voice of America are also available in the capital.

== Telephones ==
- Calling code: +257
- International call prefix: 00
- Telephone system:
  - In 2011, system described as sparse open-wire, radiotelephone communications, and low-capacity microwave radio relays; telephone density one of the lowest in the world; fixed-line connections stand at well less than 1 per 100 persons; mobile-cellular usage is increasing but remains at roughly 20 per 100 persons;
  - In 2010, system described as “primitive” with “one of the lowest” telephone densities in the world and “increasing … but meager” use of cell phones; the number of fixed-line telephone connections was far fewer than one per every 100 persons; roughly five cell phones in use per 100 persons; the domestic telephone system consists of open-wire, radiotelephone communications, along with low capacity microwave radio relay.
- Main lines:
  - 17,400 lines in use, 193rd in the world (2012);
  - 30,400 lines in use, 178th in the world (2008), a decrease from 2006;
  - 35,000 lines in use (2006);
  - 27,000 lines in use (2005);
  - 17,000 lines in use (1995).
- Mobile cellular lines:
  - 2.2 million lines, 140th in the world (2012);
  - 480,600 lines, 156th in the world (2008), a large increase, almost doubling the figure from 2006;
  - 250,000 lines (2006);
  - 153,000 lines (2005);
  - 343 lines (1995).
- Satellite earth stations: one station, operated by Intelsat in the Indian Ocean region (2008).

== Internet ==
- Internet top-level domain: .bi
- Internet users:
  - 128,799 users, 167th in the world; 1.2% of the population, 208th in the world (2012);
  - 65,000 users, 167th in the world (2008);
  - 60,000 users (2006).
- Fixed broadband: 422 subscriptions, 189th in the world; less than 0.05% of the population, 191st in the world (2012).
- Wireless broadband: Unknown (2012).
- Internet hosts:
  - 229 hosts. 198th in the world (2012);
  - 191 hosts, 189th in the world (2009);
  - 162 hosts (2008).
- IPv4: 5,376 addresses allocated, less than 0.05% of the world total, 0.5 addresses per 1000 people (2012).

=== Internet censorship and surveillance ===
There are no government restrictions on access to the Internet or credible reports that the government monitors e-mail or Internet chat rooms. Operating in a turbulent political climate, Burundi's media are subject to occasional government censorship and may practice self-censorship.

The constitution and law provide for freedom of speech and press, and the government generally respects these rights. The law prohibits the media from spreading "hate" messages or from using abusive or defamatory language against public servants acting in their official role that could damage the dignity of or respect for the public office. Libel laws prohibit the public distribution of information that exposes a person to "public contempt" and carry penalties of prison terms and fines. The crime of treason, which includes knowingly demoralizing the military or the nation in a manner that endangers national defense during a time of war, carries a criminal penalty of life imprisonment. It is a crime for anyone knowingly to disseminate or publicize false rumors likely to alarm or excite the public against the government or to promote civil war. It is illegal for anyone to display drawings, posters, photographs, or other items that may disturb the public peace. Penalties range from two months' to three years' imprisonment and fines. Some journalists, lawyers, and political party, civil society, and NGO leaders allege the government uses these laws to intimidate and harass them.

The constitution and law provide for the right to privacy, but the government does not always respect this right in practice. Authorities do not always respect the law requiring search warrants.

== Postal Service ==
Régie Nationale des Postes (RNP, National Postal Administration) is responsible for postal service in Burundi. Operating as an independent state-owned company since 1992, the RNP has reported to the Ministry of Commerce, Industry, Posts and Tourism since 2010.

== See also ==
- Burundi National Radio and Television (RTNB), the national broadcaster of Burundi.
- Media of Burundi
- Economy of Burundi
