= United Nations Security Council Resolution 1577 =

UN Security Council Resolution 1577
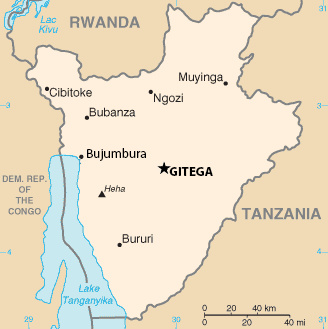
- Burundi
- Date: 1 December 2004
- Meeting no.: 5,093
- Code: S/RES/1577 (Document)
- Subject: The situation in Burundi
- Voting summary: 15 voted for; None voted against; None abstained
- Result: Adopted

Security Council composition
- Permanent members: China; France; Russia; United Kingdom; United States
- Non-permanent members: Algeria; Angola; Benin; Brazil; Chile; Germany; Pakistan; Philippines; Romania; Spain

United Nations Security Council resolution 1577, adopted unanimously on 1 December 2004, after recalling Resolution 1545 (2004) on the situation in Burundi, the Council extended the mandate of the United Nations Operation in Burundi (ONUB) for a period of six months until 1 June 2005.

The resolution was adopted amid continued debate over the jurisdiction of the International Criminal Court between members of the Security Council.

== Resolution ==
=== Observations ===
The Security Council reiterated its support for the Peace and Reconciliation Agreement signed in Arusha in 2000, calling on the relevant parties to honour their commitments under the agreement. It highlighted positive developments that had taken place since the ONUB mission was deployed, including the adoption of an interim constitution which provided for all communities to be represented in future post-transition institutions.

Meanwhile, all Burundian parties were urged to continue dialogue and reminded them to hold elections by 2005. All violence, violations of human rights and the massacre of civilians at Gatumba were condemned.

=== Acts ===
Acting under Chapter VII of the United Nations Charter, the Council called on all parties and governments in the region to condemn incitement to violence, violations of human rights and international humanitarian law, co-operate with ONUB and the United Nations Mission in the Democratic Republic of Congo (MONUC) and end impunity. In particular, the governments of the Democratic Republic of the Congo and Rwanda were asked to co-operate with the investigation into the Gatumba massacre, while the council was "troubled" that the National Forces of Liberation had claimed responsibility for the massacre.

The Secretary-General was asked to report on the situation in Burundi at regular intervals.

== See also ==
- Burundi Civil War
- List of United Nations Security Council Resolutions 1501 to 1600 (2003–2005)
- United Nations Integrated Office in Burundi
