= Agriculture in Burundi =

Burundi has the eighth highest proportion of women working in agriculture, forestry and fishing in the world.

Agriculture in the central African country of Burundi produced in 2018:

- 2.3 million tons of cassava;
- 1.6 million tons of banana;
- 583 thousand tons of sweet potato;
- 556 thousand tons of vegetable;
- 393 thousand tons of beans;
- 302 thousand tons of potato;
- 290 thousand tons of maize;
- 178 thousand tons of sugar cane;
- 85 thousand tons of palm oil;
- 56 thousand tons of taro;
- 55 thousand tons of rice;
- 53 thousand tons of tea;

The country grows smaller quantities of other agricultural products, like sorghum (28 thousand tons) and coffee (14 thousand tons). Agriculture makes up more than 50% of Burundi's GDP.
