= Scouting and Guiding in Burundi =

Scouting and Guiding associations in Burundi

The Scout and Guide movement in Burundi is served by two organisations

- Association des Guides du Burundi, member of the World Association of Girl Guides and Girl Scouts
- Association des Scouts du Burundi, member of the World Organization of the Scout Movement
