= Village Health Works =

Burundi NGO

- Formation: 2007
- Founder: Deogratias Niyizonkiza
- Headquarters: Kigutu, Burundi
- Website: https://www.villagehealthworks.org/

Village Health Works (VHW) is a non-governmental organization operating in a rural area of southwestern Burundi. The organization was founded in 2007 by Deogratias Niyizonkiza, a Burundian-born American humanitarian.

VHW has expanded since its founding in 2007 to include programs in health care, education, nutrition, and community engagement. The campus now features a teaching hospital, the Kigutu Hospital and Women's Health Pavilion, and the Kigutu International Academy.
