= Prince Louis Rwagasore Clinical Hospital =

Clinique Prince Louis Rwagasore
- Location within Burundi

Geography
- Location: Bujumbura, Bujumbura Mairie Province, Burundi
- Coordinates: 3.38776°S 29.36766°E

Organisation
- Care system: Public

Links
- Lists: Hospitals in Burundi

The Prince Louis Rwagasore Clinical Hospital (French: Hôpital Clinique Prince Louis Rwagasore, CPLR) is a hospital in Bujumbura, Bujumbura Mairie Province, Burundi.

== Location ==
The Clinique Prince Louis Rwagasore is a public health center (CDS) and communal medical centre (CMC) in the Central Health Zone of Bujumbura. It is in the center of Bujumbura, just south of the old central market. It is south of the Avenue Croix Rouge, east of the Boulevard Patrice Lumumba and north of the Avenue Piere Ngendandumwe.

== History ==
The Prince Louis Rwagasore Clinical Hospital, formerly called the Doctor Rhodain hospital, was the first hospital to provide service in Bujumbara. It was built in 1945. In the early years it discriminated against ordinary citizens of Burundi. The Hôpital Prince Régent Charles, completed in 1949, provided treatment to citizens refused by the Doctor Rhodain hospital.

In May 2012, the hospital launched a pilot mobile medical care service (Somado). For a fee, a doctor, nurse and other medical workers treated patients suffering from chronic illnesses in their own homes. One of the hospital's three ambulances was assigned to the service. The service was provided to paying members.

The hospital is a large, yellow-painted building, now named for Louis Rwagasore, a hero of the independence struggle. A 2022 report described the hospital, which once welcomed VIPs, as having gradually deteriorated due to chronic underfunding. Some doors cannot close, walls are peeling, beds are small and old, and water is not always available.

== Sources ==
- Financement base sur la performance CDS CMC CPLR (in French), Ministere de la Sante Publique et de la Lutte Contre le Sida
- "Historique de l'Hôpital Prince Régent Charles", MemoireOnline (in French)
- "La Clinique Prince Louis Rwagasore innove avec des soins mobiles", Iwacu, 5 May 2013
- Ndikumana, Jonathan (12 August 2022), "Clinique Prince Louis Rwagasore : Le non entretien des locaux menace un bâtiment public de grande envergure", Burundi Eco (in French)
- "Way: Clinique Prince Louis Rwagasore (87173395)", OpenStreetMap
