= Burundi–Germany relations =

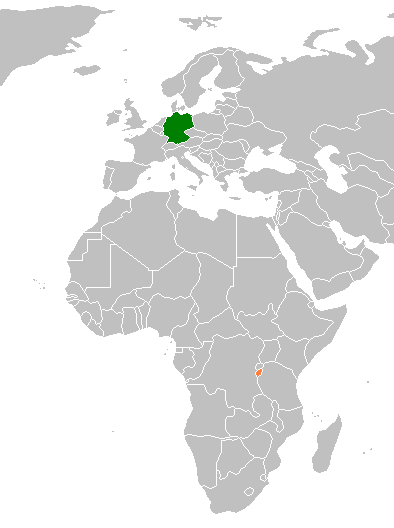

- Germany: Burundi

Burundi–Germany relations are relations between Burundi and Germany. As part of German East Africa, Burundi was once a German colony. Both countries established diplomatic relations shortly after Burundi's independence in 1962.

== History ==
=== Colonial era ===
As a result of the Berlin Congo Conference of 1884/85, the areas that now belong to Burundi fell within the sphere of influence of the German Empire. The Germans did not initially occupy the country, and it was only in 1899 that Burundi became part of German East Africa. In contrast to the Rwandan monarchy, which chose to accept German rule, Burundi's King Mwezi IV Gisabo resisted all European influence, refused to wear European clothing, and opposed the incursion of European missionaries and administrators. His son-in-law, Inanga Maconco, joined forces with the Germans when they tried to capture Mwezi. The Germans promised Maconco a high administrative position in return. However, he was arrested and hanged by the Germans after being accused of stealing a weapon. The German troops and some of the locals who had allied themselves with the Europeans finally drove Mwezi out of his camp and were able to force him to accept an agreement. With the Treaty of Ikiganda in 1913, Mwezi finally submitted to the German Empire. However, German rule always remained indirect, with the local nobility acting as intermediaries, and colonization was therefore never particularly intensive. The later Burundian capital, Bujumbura, emerged from the German military base of Marienheim and represents a lasting legacy of the German colonial era. During World War I, Rwanda-Urundi was taken by British and Belgian troops and awarded to Belgium as a mandated territory after the war.

=== After Burundi's independence ===
Burundi finally gained its independence from Belgium on July 1, 1962. The Federal Republic of Germany established diplomatic relations with Burundi in January 1963 and opened an embassy in Bujumbura. The FRG was the first country to provide development aid to Burundi immediately after its independence. After the end of the Hallstein Doctrine in 1972, Burundi also established diplomatic relations with the GDR, even though it was never represented by its own embassy in Burundi. In 1987, a German-Burundian friendship society was founded. Burundian-German relations also suffered from the unrest in Burundi in the 1990s, and the German Embassy in Bujumbura remained closed between 1999 and 2006. Efforts to revive bilateral cultural relations began in 2012. However, in 2015, Germany suspended development aid after Burundi's president Pierre Nkurunziza was unconstitutionally elected for a third term. Development aid resumed in 2020, following the death of Nkurunziza and the election of his successor, Évariste Ndayishimiye.

== Partnership between Burundi and Baden-Württemberg ==
In 1984, a partnership was agreed between Burundi and the German state of Baden-Württemberg. In 2014, this was formalized by an agreement between Burundi's foreign minister Laurent Kavakure and Baden-Württemberg's minister-president Winfried Kretschmann. The partnership is implementing a range of projects in which churches, local authorities and civil society groups are playing a major role. The partnership's joint projects are divided into six clusters: agroforestry, reconciliation and peace work, governance and local authorities, health, a school initiative, and climate.

== Economic relations ==
In economic terms, Burundi is one of the poorest countries in the world, and German economic relations with the country are correspondingly underdeveloped. In 2024, German exports of goods to Burundi amounted to 13.4 million euros, while imports from the country amounted to 4.4 million euros. This put Burundi 179th in the ranking of Germany's trading partners.

== Cultural relations ==
Efforts have been made to revitalize bilateral cultural relations between the two countries. In 2012, German film weeks were held in Burundi for the first time. In 2015, the German Embassy in Burundi supported the Burundian National Museum in Gitega in creating a catalog of its holdings.

The University of Burundi and some schools in the country offer German courses that are taken up by almost 3,500 people a year. The German Embassy and the Goethe-Institut Nairobi promote the German language in the country.
