= Burundi–Netherlands relations =

Burundi–Netherlands relations relations
- Burundi: Netherlands

Burundi–Netherlands relations are the bilateral relations between Burundi and the Netherlands. Diplomatic ties between the two nations were established in 1964.

== History ==
Bert Koenders and Alain Aimé Nyamitwe in The Hague

On July 14, 2003, Burundian President Domitien Ndayizeye met with Agnes van Ardenne for talks between the two nations. Both nations discussed relaunching the peace process between the two, with Ndayizeye highlighting the financial and economic difficulty in Burundi.

On August 10, 2003, Dutch Foreign Minister Jaap de Hoop Scheffer and Development Minister Agnes van Ardenne toured Africa, including Burundi, discussing armed conflict in the nation.

On August 17, 2009, in Bujumbura, security and defense delegations signed an agreement on security sector development.

Burundi and the Netherlands celebrated 60 years of diplomatic ties on July 6, 2024.

On February 25, 2025, the Netherlands embassy in Burundi launched a 2 year deal that aims at promoting innovation in horticulture, fisheries, and essential oils. This costed €1.95 million.

On August 3, 2026, it was revealed that the embassy of the Netherlands in Burundi would cease on July 31, 2027, and would instead be switching to Dar es Salaam.

== Trade ==
In 2024, Burundi exported $621k worth of goods to the Netherlands. The top export was coffee, which totaled $612k. In the same year the Netherlands exported $5.55M worth of goods to Burundi, their top export being beer, which totaled $1.8M.

== High-level visits ==
=== High level visits from Burundi to the Netherlands ===
- Domitien Ndayizeye (July 14, 2003)

== Diplomatic missions ==
- Burundi has an embassy in The Hague.
- Netherlands has an embassy in Bujumbura.

== See also ==
- Foreign relations of Burundi
- Foreign relations of the Netherlands
