= List of ecoregions in Burundi =

The following is a list of ecoregions in Burundi, according to the Worldwide Fund for Nature (WWF).

== Terrestrial ecoregions ==
By major habitat type:

=== Tropical and subtropical moist broadleaf forests ===
- Albertine Rift montane forests

=== Tropical and subtropical grasslands, savannas, and shrublands ===
- Central Zambezian miombo woodlands
- Victoria Basin forest-savanna mosaic

== Freshwater ecoregions ==
By bioregion:

=== Eastern and Coastal ===
- Malagarasi-Moyowosi

=== Great Lakes ===
- Lake Tanganyika
- Lake Victoria Basin
