= Prince Regent Charles Hospital =

Hospital in Bujumbura fully public from 1949 until 1992

Geography
- Location: Bujumbura, Bujumbura Mairie Province, Burundi
- Coordinates: 3.373°S 29.362°E

Organisation
- Care system: Public

Links
- Website: https://www.hprc-burundi.bi/
- Lists: Hospitals in Burundi

Prince Regent Charles Hospital (French: Hôpital Prince Régent Charles, H.P.R.C.) is a hospital located in Bujumbura, Burundi. It was a gift from Prince Charles, Count of Flanders, and opened in 1949. It was fully public until 1992, when it became a special domain of the state.

== Location ==
The Prince Regent Charles Hospital is in central Bujumbura between the Avenue de l'Hôpital and Avenue de la Santé, just west of the Chausée du Peuple Murundi. It is northeast of the Golf de Bujumbura course. It is a tertiary public hospital in the central health zone of Bujumbura Mairie Province, and serves a population of 157,846.

== History ==
The Prince Regent Charles of Belgium toured the region in 1947 and visited Usumbura in the colony of Ruanda-Urundi. At that time, the only hospital in the city was the Doctor Rhodain Hospital (now the Prince Louis Rwagasore Clinical Hospital, which only served European settlers and a few so-called evolved nationals and politicians.

The Prince initiated construction of a hospital that would be open to everyone in the Buyenzidans urban commune. The site was then a camp for personnel of the Compagnie du chemin de fer du Congo supérieur aux Grands Lacs africains. The hospital was completed in 1949 and inaugurated that year.

After Burundi became independent on 1 July 1962, most of the Belgian doctors left the interior of the country, and the hospital had to serve people from all parts of Burundi. The hospital had to build new infrastructure and adapt existing buildings to cope with the demand. The physiotherapy building was converted to use for administration, the current emergency department was added, and in 2010 with help from Belgium there was a general expansion of the hospital.

From 1978 to 1984, the hospital undertook training of students from the Faculty of Medicine of the University of Burundi and other institutions. This role was then transferred to the University Hospital Center of Kamenge (CHUK). HPRC was a public hospital until Decree-Law No. 100/011 of 6 February 1992 gave it an independent administration. However, it remains under the supervision of the Ministry for Public Health and the fight against AIDS.

== Sources ==
- Financement base sur la performance HT H.P.R.C (in French), Ministere de la Sante Publique et de la Lutte Contre le Sida
- "Historique de l'Hôpital Prince Régent Charles", MemoireOnline (in French)
- "Way: Prince Regent Charles (997079377)", OpenStreetMap
