= List of current Burundian governors =

This is a list of current provincial governors in Burundi, as of 2025.

Provinces	Governor
Buhumuza	Dénise Ndaruhekeye
Bujumbura	Aloys Ndayikengurukiye
Burunga	Parfait Mboninyibuka
Butanyerera	Victor Segasago
Gitega	Liboire Bigirimana

== See also ==
- List of presidents of Burundi
- List of heads of government of Burundi
- Vice-President of Burundi
- List of mayors of Bujumbura
- Lists of office-holders
