= .bi =

Top-level Internet domain for Burundi

- Introduced: 21 October 1996
- TLD type: Country code top-level domain
- Status: Active
- Registry: Burundi National Center of Information Technology
- Intended use: Entries connected with Burundi
- Actual use: Gets some use, some of which is not related to Burundi; also used to signify business intelligence
- DNSSEC: Yes
- IDN: No
- Registry website: nic.bi

.bi is the Internet country code top-level domain (ccTLD) for Burundi. It is administered by the Burundi National Center of Information Technology.

The .bi domain was first delegated in October 1996. It was delegated to the entire country on July 16, 2002.

== Second-level domains ==
- .com.bi
- .co.bi
- .org.bi
- .or.bi
- .edu.bi
- .gov.bi
- .info.bi
