= United Nations Security Council Resolution 1375 =

UN Security Council Resolution 1375
- Location of Burundi
- Date: 29 October 2001
- Meeting no.: 4,399
- Code: S/RES/1375 (Document)
- Subject: The situation in Burundi
- Voting summary: 15 voted for; None voted against; None abstained
- Result: Adopted

Security Council composition
- Permanent members: China; France; Russia; United Kingdom; United States
- Non-permanent members: Bangladesh; Colombia; Ireland; Jamaica; Mali; Mauritius; Norway; Singapore; Tunisia; Ukraine

United Nations Security Council resolution 1375, adopted unanimously on 29 October 2001, after reaffirming all resolutions and statements by the President of the Security Council on the civil war in Burundi, endorsed efforts by South Africa and other states to implement the Arusha Accords and supported the establishment of an interim multinational security presence in Burundi.

The Security Council reaffirmed that the Arusha Peace and Reconciliation Agreement remained as a basis for a settlement of the conflict in Burundi and welcomed mediation efforts by the former South African President Nelson Mandela and the United Nations. There was concern at the ongoing violence in the country and its consequences on the situation in Burundi and regional instability.

The resolution, initiated by Jamaica and Mauritius, supported the future installation of a transitional government on 1 November 2001. Armed groups, including the Forces pour la Défense de la Démocratie (FDD) and Forces Nationales de Libération (FNL) were urged to end hostilities and attacks against the civilian population and enter into negotiations as part of the peace process.

The Council supported the establishment of a temporary multinational security presence in the country to protect returning political leaders and train a Burundian protection force, asking the Burundian government to keep the Council informed in this regard. The peacekeeping mission would be the first time South Africa had participated in such an operation. It expressed willingness to consider further contributions to the peace process and urged the international community to provide assistance.

== See also ==
- Burundi Civil War
- History of Burundi
- List of United Nations Security Council Resolutions 1301 to 1400 (2000–2002)
