= United Nations Security Council Resolution 1545 =

United Nations Security Council resolution

UN Security Council Resolution 1545
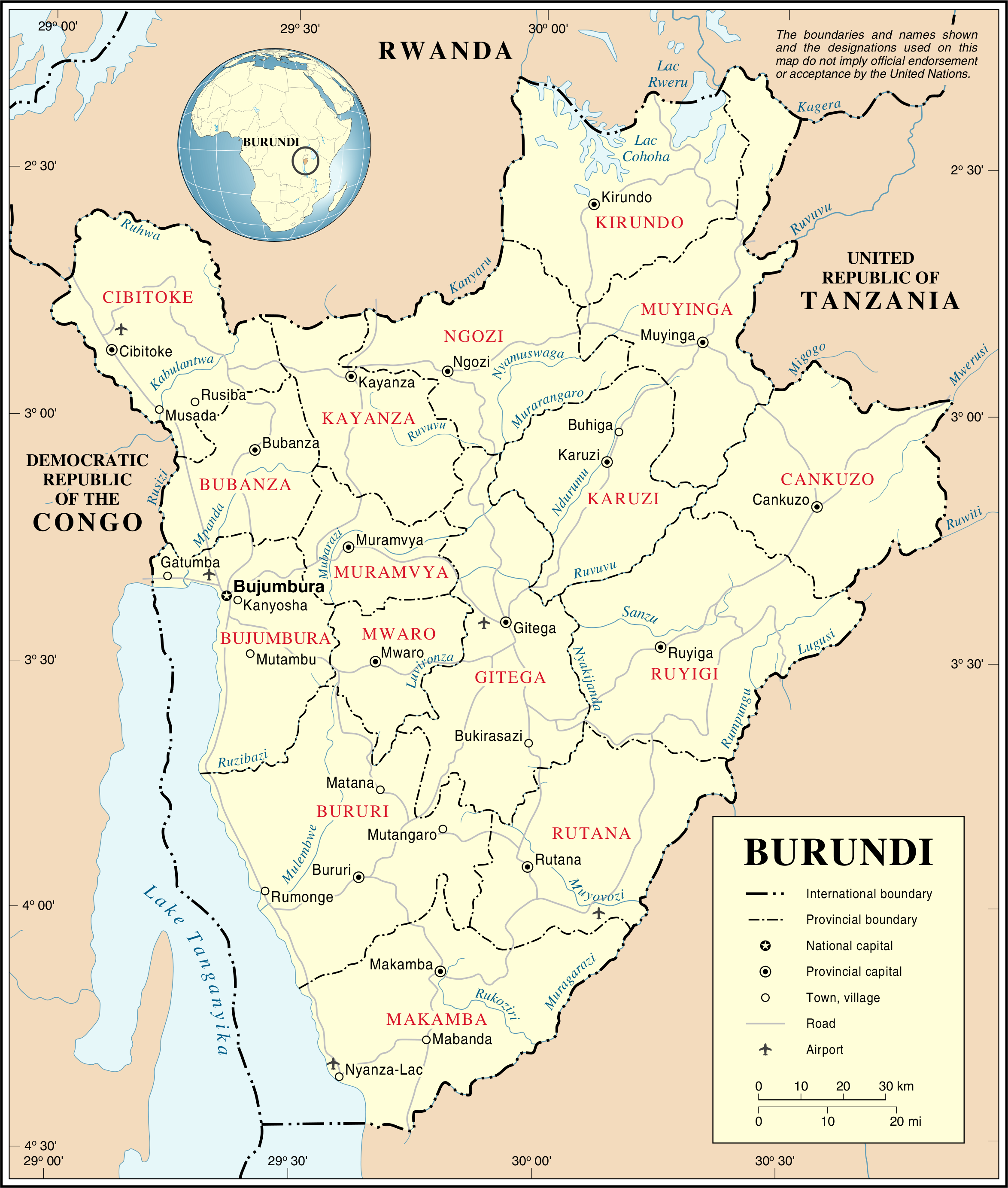
- Burundi
- Date: 21 May 2004
- Meeting no.: 4,975
- Code: S/RES/1545 (Document)
- Subject: The situation in Burundi
- Voting summary: 15 voted for; None voted against; None abstained
- Result: Adopted

Security Council composition
- Permanent members: China; France; Russia; United Kingdom; United States
- Non-permanent members: Algeria; Angola; Benin; Brazil; Chile; Germany; Pakistan; Philippines; Romania; Spain

United Nations Security Council Resolution 1545, adopted unanimously on 21 May 2004, after recalling all resolutions on the situation in Burundi, particularly Resolution 1375 (2001), the council established the United Nations Operation in Burundi (ONUB) to bring about peace and national reconciliation in the country.

The ONUB operation would replace the African Union mission in the country.

== Resolution ==
=== Observations ===
The Security Council reiterated its support for the Peace and Reconciliation Agreement signed in Arusha in 2000, calling on the relevant parties to honour their commitments under the agreement. Transitional institutions were urged to enact legislation for election preparations before the transitional period ended on 31 October 2004. It noted that two ceasefire agreements were signed between the rebel National Council for the Defense of Democracy – Forces for the Defense of Democracy (CNDD-FDD) and the transitional government, though hostilities in parts of Burundi continued.

The preamble of the resolution also condemned all violations of human rights and international humanitarian law, including mass rape, and the need to bring the perpetrators to justice. There was concern at the economic and humanitarian situation of the majority of the civilian population. Meanwhile, the council welcomed progress in preparing the disarmament, demobilisation and reintegration (DDR) programme for combatants, and the efforts of a mission of the African Union deployed in Burundi were praised. It was also aware of the difficulties of maintaining stability in Burundi unless it was achieved in neighbouring states, particularly the Democratic Republic of the Congo.

=== Acts ===
Acting under Chapter VII of the United Nations Charter, the council authorised the ONUB operation for an initial period of six months, beginning on 1 June 2004. It would be headed by the Special Representative of the Secretary-General, and consist of 5,650 military personnel and 120 police. Furthermore, it was authorised to use all necessary means to fulfill the following mandate:

- Monitor and investigate any violations of the ceasefire;
- Promote trust between the Burundian forces, collecting and securing weapons;
- Disarm and demobilise combatants;
- Monitor the cantonment of the armed forces and their heavy weapons;
- Monitor the illegal arms trade;
- Provide secure conditions for humanitarian aid delivery and the return of refugees;
- Provide a safe environment for the electoral process;
- Protect the population against imminent threats;
- Protect United Nations personnel and facilities, co-ordinate demining efforts.

ONUB was also tasked with assisting the Burundian government through monitoring of the country's borders; institutional reforms; training of the army and police; electoral activities; reforming the judiciary and penal systems; promoting and protecting human rights; extending the authority of the state throughout the country; and running the national DDR programme.

The resolution asked Burundi to conclude a Status of Forces Agreement with the Secretary-General Kofi Annan within 30 days, and all parties were called upon to co-operate with ONUB. It was also necessary that ONUB had access to effective public channels such as radio, television and newspapers to promote the peace process and the role of the operation in Burundi. Meanwhile, donors were urged to contribute towards the long-term development of Burundi.

Finally, the council directed the operation in Burundi and the United Nations Mission in the Democratic Republic of the Congo (MONUC) to co-ordinate their activities and share military information, particularly with regard to movement of rebels and weapons. The Secretary-General was asked to report on the situation in Burundi at regular intervals.

== See also ==
- Burundi Civil War
- List of United Nations Security Council Resolutions 1501 to 1600 (2003–2005)
- United Nations Integrated Office in Burundi
