= Kamenge University Hospital =

Centre Hospitalo - Universitaire De Kamenge Roi Khaled

Geography
- Location: Bujumbura, Bujumbura Mairie Province, Burundi
- Coordinates: 3.35684°S 29.38527°E

Organisation
- Care system: Public

Links
- Website: www.chuk.bi
- Lists: Hospitals in Burundi

The Kamenge University Hospital (CHUK), formally the University of Kamenge Hospital Center / King Khaled Hospital (French: Centre Hospitalo - Universitaire De Kamenge / Hôpital Roi Khaled) is a teaching hospital in Bujumbura, Burundi.

== Administrative structure ==
The hospital was created by Decree #100/121 on 28 December 1984. Under Ministerial Ordinance #6101/1175 of 11 December 2006 it was placed under the supervision of the Rector of the University of Burundi. It is self-governing, but receives state subsidies. The CHUK is under the authority of the Ministry of National Education and Scientific Research.

== Operations ==
The CHUK provides medical and health care, serves as a training center, and supports research. It is home to a Faculty of Medicine and offers internships to students from higher education institutions and students from paramedical schools. It does not have an important technical platform, but is Burundi's national reference center.

The CHUK is in the northwest of Bujumbura. As of 2024 the CHUK had 420 beds, and a total of 730 employees. Departments are Surgery, Gynecology and Obstetrics, Anesthesia and Resuscitation, Pediatrics, Internal Medicine, Community Medicine, Specialties (ENT, Ophthalmology, Stomatology), Radiology, Laboratory and Pharmacy.

== Events ==
On 19 December 2022 Brasseries et Limonaderies du Burundi (Brarudi), a Heineken N.V. subsidiary, announced that it and the Kamenge University Teaching Hospital had launched the Niwonkwe project, funded by the Heineken Africa Foundation. The project would provide obstetric equipment and training of health workers at CHUK and the Kabezi District Hospital.

== Sources ==
- BRARUDI and CHUK, Kamenge University Hospital (CHUK), officially launched the "NIWONKWE" project, Brarudi, 19 December 2022
- Centre Hospitalo - Universitaire De Kamenge Roi Khaled (in French), CHUK
- Historique (in French), CHUK
- Le Centre Hospitalo-Universitaire de Kamenge (CHUK) - Burundi (in French), FGFRM
