= Bumerec Hospital =

Hospital in Bujumbura

Bumerec

Geography
- Location: Bujumbura, Bujumbura Mairie Province, Burundi
- Coordinates: 3.39298°S 29.35102°E

Organisation
- Care system: Public

Links
- Website: www.hmkamenge.bi
- Lists: Hospitals in Burundi

Bumerec Hospital (Note: The name is a contraction of Burundi Medical and Research Center, but most sources use "Bumerec" rather than "BUMEREC" or the full name.) (French: Hôpital Bumerec), or the Burundi Medical and Research Center, is a private hospital located in Bujumbura, Burundi.

== Location ==
The Bumerec Hospital is in the Kabondo district in the southwest of central Bujumbura, between the Avenue du Large and Lake Tanganyika. The hospital is well-equipped, has an emergency department and a surgery, and gives specialized consultations.

== History ==
There was an attempted army coup against the government of President Pierre Nkurunziza on 13 May 2015, but it failed and the leaders were arrested. Two rebels who had been injured in a gunfight with loyalist forces were admitted to the hospital on 15 May 2015. Two other rebels entered the hospital in the morning. Later in the day between 50 and 100 soldiers and police officers stormed the Bumerec hospital in search of supporters of the coup. They opened fire on the bedridden rebels, then searched the building, where the other two were hiding among the patients. One loyalist policeman was shot and died, one rebel died and the other three were wounded, and taken away.

On 1 April 2020 the health minister of Burundi, Thadée Ndikumana, announced that the first COVID-19 cases in the country were being hospitalized at Bumerec hospital. One had returned to Burundi from Rwanda and the other from Dubai.

== Sources ==
- Buchanan, Elsa (17 May 2015), Burundi: Government kills and kidnaps fighters in hospital where they were treated, claims doctor
- "BUMEREC HOSPITAL", Isoko
- "Burundi announces first two Covid-19 cases", The Citizen (Tanzania), 1 April 2020
- "Way: BUMEREC (784512721) (122956893)", OpenStreetMap
