= Mount Heha =

Mountain in Burundi

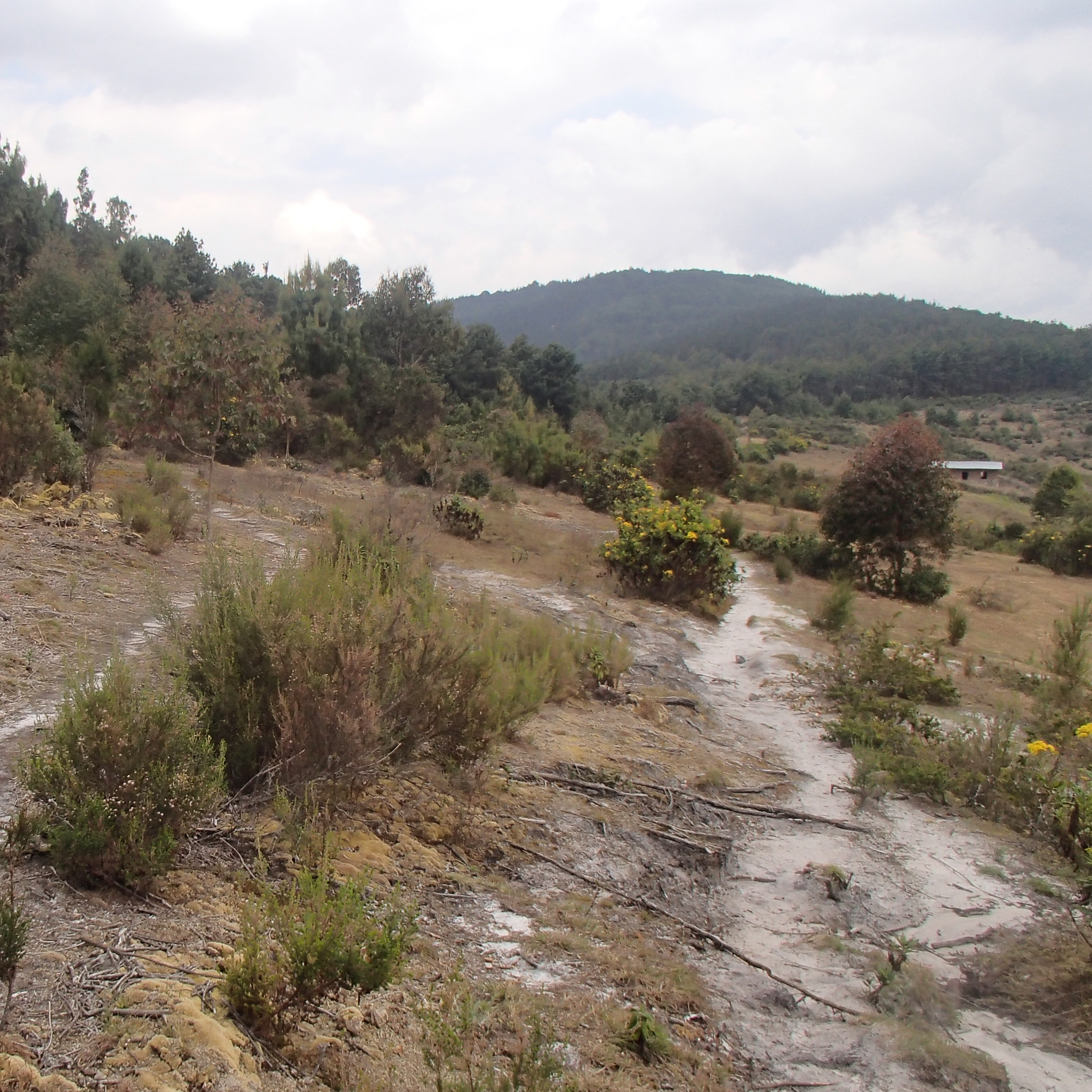
- Mount Heha in 2018

Highest point
- Elevation: 2,684 m (8,806 ft)
- Listing: Country high point
- Coordinates: 3°36′12″S 29°29′57″E

Geography
- Location within Burundi
- Location: Bujumbura Rural, Burundi
- Parent range: Burundi Highlands

Mount Heha is the highest mountain in Burundi and the highest point in the Burundi Highlands mountain range. It is located in the Bujumbura Rural province of Burundi and it lies approximately 20 km to the east of Lake Tanganyika and about 30 km to the southeast of Bujumbura, the largest city and former capital of Burundi.
