= Culture of Burundi =

The culture of Burundi is based on local tradition and common influence with its neighbors.

== People ==
Although referred to as ethnic groups the Hutu, the Tutsi, the Twa, and the Ganwa all share the same culture, language and land. In Kirundi, the national language of Burundi, these ethnic groups are called miryango, which can be translated to clans or tribe.

=== Pre-colonial society ===
Before colonization Burundi and Rwanda formed one kingdom, Ruanda-Urundi. The Burundian part of society was ruled by Kings also called Mwami. There are no records of discrimination during this time. Every clan was involved in royal duties, for inclusion purposes. While there were physical differences between clans, they all shared to same customs and beliefs.

=== Colonial society ===
Burundi's colonization started in the early 19th century, which is later than most African countries. First, German colonizers were assigned Rwanda and Burundi at the Berlin Conference of 1884/1885. Belgians than took over the colony after the World War I. Both colonizers implemented Christianity and a new hierarchical order, by making traditional ceremonies illegal and by creating a hierarchical order between clans.

=== Post-colonial society ===
Burundi and Rwanda experienced multiple civil wars after their independence, and policies that were put in place by colonizers were kept. Hutus were subjugated to forced labor controlled by Tutsi clans. This created persistent underdevelopment of the clans and tensions that created civil wars.

Burundi gained its independence in 1962, but there are still post-colonial institutions present in a variety of traditional cultural and political centers. Christianism is the main religion in the country, there are two main groups catholic and protestant, but there is also Islam, and different types of animism.

In the Burundian population all clans still mainly speak Kirundi, and colonialism brought French and English. French is used by society in private and government institutions for communication, knowledge acquisition, and cultural production. Which undermines the local language and limits the population that can access these institutions.

== Music ==
Burundi has a wide range of music, from traditional percussions to modern music. Drums are the main instruments in Burundi, because of the heritage of the Royal Drummers of Burundi, a group of musicians that play the instrument, sing and dance. In the precolonial period, the drummers would often play for the Kings and royal families, Royal drummers would announce the beginning of the day and the ending of the day. They would also play during special spiritual events such as enthronements or the beginning of the agricultural season. To this day, Burundians still celebrate important events with drummers. The Intangible Cultural Heritage of UNESCO in 2014 added the drummers' practices to their list.

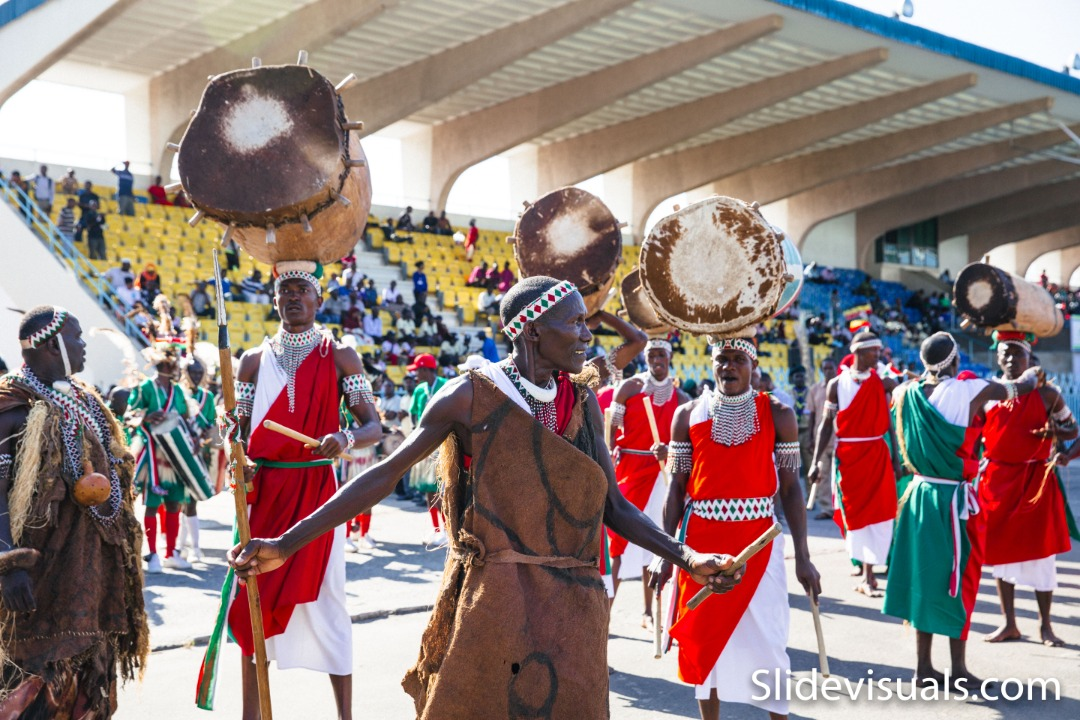
Burundian Drummers

In 2017, a decree was passed by the government, legally banned women from beating drums as it was explained to be a men's activity, despite the centuries-long tradition of female drum-players in the country.

Burundian women greet each other in an interlocking rhythmic vocal form called akazehe.

== Media ==
In the 1990s, Burundi had several private media companies that started broadcasting government events and started to publish subjects considered taboo like political violence and corruption. It started a liberation movement that resulted in tensions between the government and the media. As most private media companies were and are funded by foreign aid, the government tried to exercise control by cutting the maximum funds that these companies could receive, obligating the companies to monitor the population, and making it legally difficult to have freedom of speech.

== Literature and oral tradition ==
During the 1972 genocide, many Burundians involved in higher education were killed, stalling written culture. This combined with the lower literacy rate have encouraged an adherence to Burundi's strong oral tradition, which relays history and life lessons through storytelling, poetry, and song. This is evident in kivivuga amazina, an improvisational poetry contest played by cattle herders, in which they boast their abilities or accomplishments.

== Sports ==
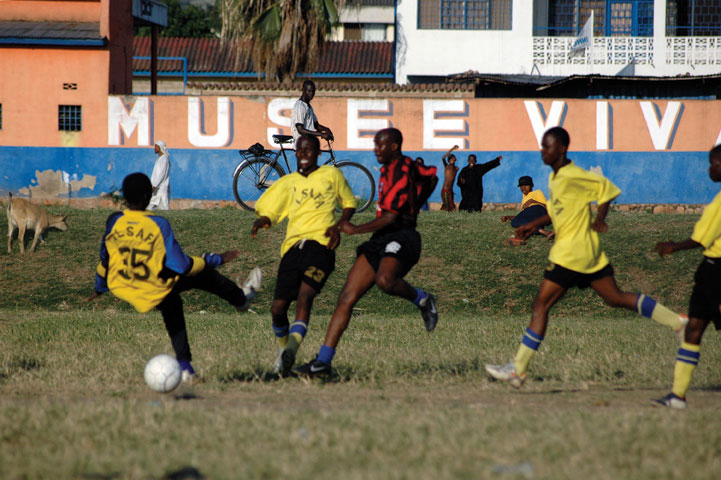
Football in Burundi

Football is a popular pastime throughout the country, as are mancala games. Many Burundians celebrate Christian holidays and Burundian Independence Day, though the largest celebration occurs on New Year's Day with feasting and traditional drumming and dancing.

Burundi's women's national volleyball team lastly qualified for the 2021 Women's African Nations Volleyball Championship.

== Cuisine ==
Burundian cuisine utilises maize and bananas as staple foods and often contains red kidney beans. Meals are not usually accompanied by sweet foods or dessert. During celebrations and gatherings, Burundians drink homemade banana wine and beer, sometimes drinking through straws from a single large container.

In some areas, brochettes and frites are a popular remnant of the Belgian colonial period. The presence of Lake Tanganyika adds fish such as ngangara and mukeke to Burundian cuisine. A national brewery produces Primus and Amstel beers.

== Education and language ==
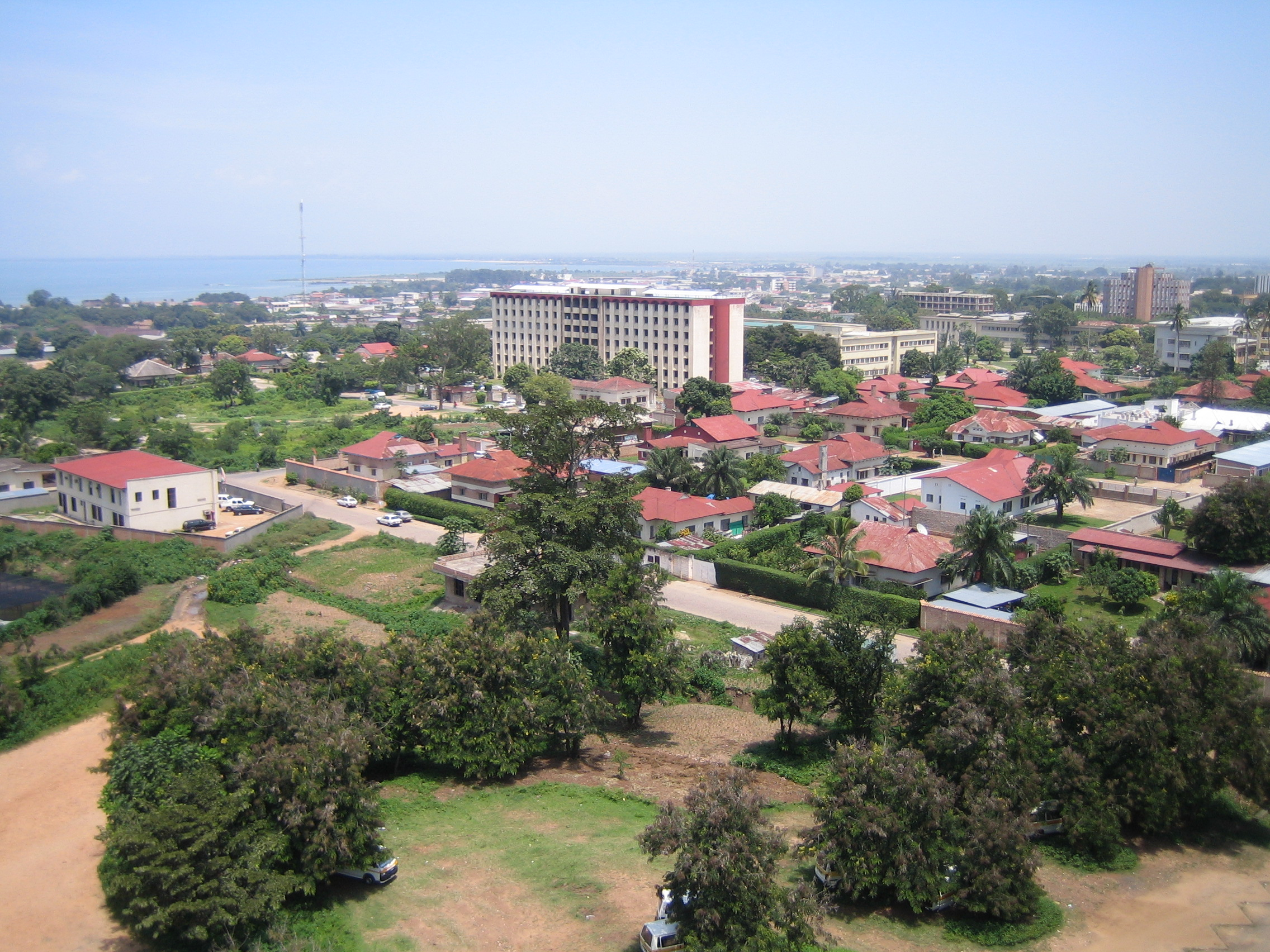
Central Bujumbura, capital of Burundi

In the public education system of Burundi, only one student out of 100 will be able to attend university. The public elementary schools are mostly taught in Kirundi with a few French classes, and secondary schools and universities are taught in French. It creates difficulties that result in the alienation of local communities, affecting girls more than boys. Recently Burundi has added Kiswahili and English to the curriculum, creating an even wider gap in the population. For the past decade, there has been a shortage of staff, faculty, and material in the public sector as well.

== See also ==
- List of African cuisines

== Bibliography ==
- Marsh, Ian (2015). Africa [3 volumes]: An Encyclopedia of Culture and Society: Bloomsbury Academic.
- Mbonyingingo, Audace; Ntiranyibagira, Constantin (2020). Beating Drums or Beating Women? An Analysis of the Drum Universe in Burundi. (2020). Journal of Postcolonial Writing and World Literatures, 1(1), 15–30. https://royalliteglobal.com/world-literatures/article/view/50
- Maguire, L. (1995). Power ethnicized: the pursuit of protection and participation in Rwanda and Burundi. Buffalo Journal of International Law, 2(1), 49–90.
- Sentamba, E., & Kilonzo, Susan M. (2023). The palgrave handbook of religion, peacebuilding, and development in Africa. In Country case studies on religion, peacebuilding and development in Africa (pp. 199–216). essay, Springer International Publishing.
- Albert, E. M. (1964). “Rhetoric,” “Logic,” and “Poetics” in Burundi: Culture Patterning of Speech Behavior. American Anthropologist, 66(6), 35–54. JSTOR 668160
- Blouin, A. (2021). CULTURE AND CONTRACTS: THE HISTORICAL LEGACY OF FORCED LABOUR. The Economic Journal.
- Jackson, T. (2000). Equal Access to Education: A Peace Imperative for Burundi. International Alert.
- Juan, A. D. (2017). Traditional” Resolution of Land Conflicts: The Survival of Precolonial Dispute Settlement in Burundi. Comparative Political Studies Volume 50, Issue 13. Peace and Conflict Management Review.
- Oumar Kane, A.-J. B. (2016). MEDIA–STATE RELATIONS IN BURUNDI: Overview of a Post Traumatic Media Ecology. Communication.
- Rwantabagu, H. (2011). Tradition, globalisation and language dilemma in education: African options for the 21st century. Int Rev Educ.
- Mabweazara, H. M. (2018). Newsmaking Cultures in Africa. Penryn, UK: palgarve macmillan.
- Ntiyanogeye, A. (2008). Burundi Media and Good Governance. Peace and Conflict Management Review.
- Jamar, A. (2022). Accounting for which violent past? transitional justice, epistemic violence, and colonial durabilities in Burundi. Critical African Studies.
