= Demographics of Burundi =

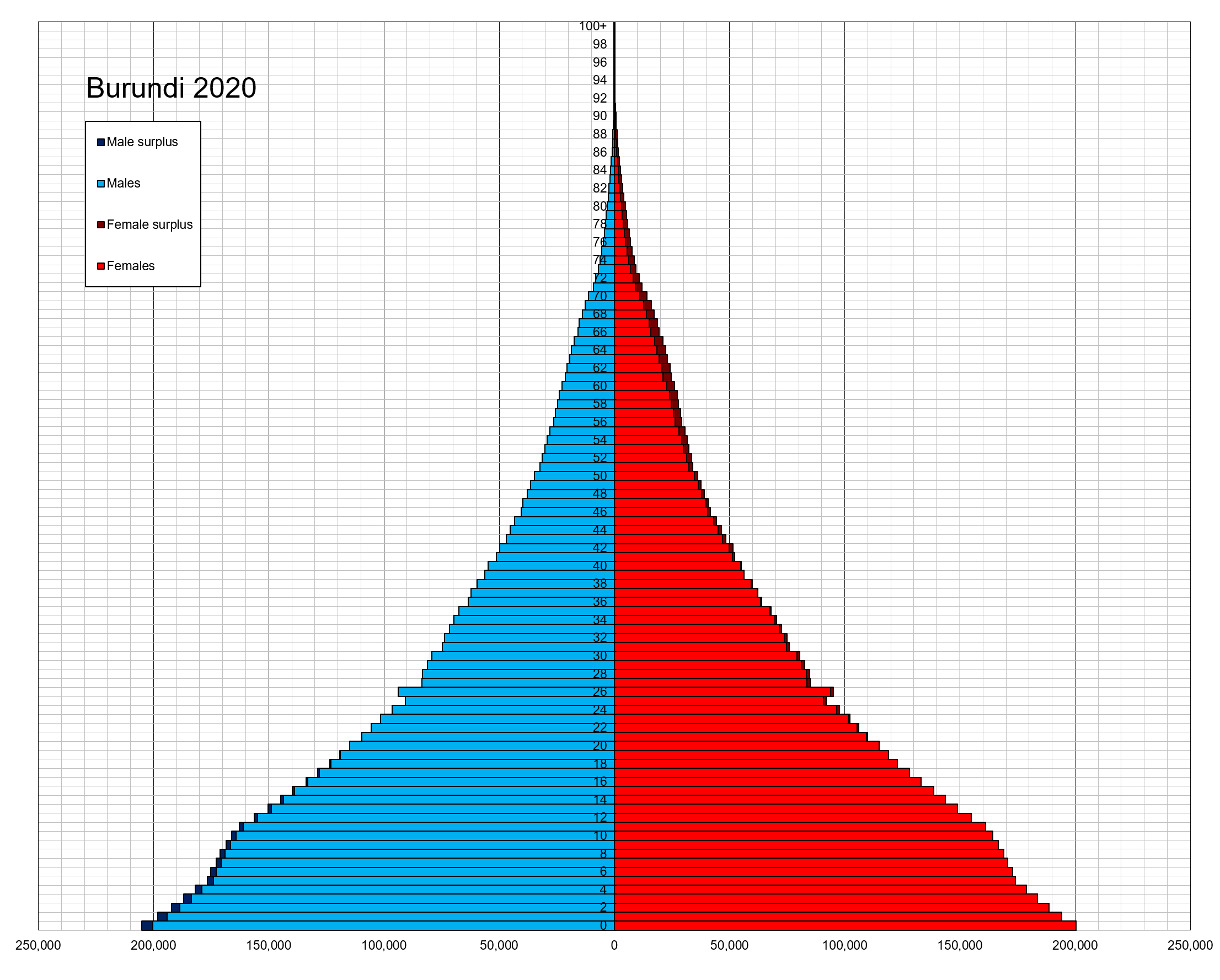
- Population pyramid of Burundi in 2020
- Population: 12,696,478 (2022 est.)
- Growth rate: 3.63% (2022 est.)
- Birth rate: 35.17 births/1,000 population (2022 est.)
- Death rate: 5.96 deaths/1,000 population (2022 est.)
- Life expectancy: 67.41 years
  - male: 65.32 years
  - female: 69.59 years
- Fertility rate: 5.03 children born/woman (2022 est.)
- Infant mortality: 37.84 deaths/1,000 live births
- Net migration rate: 7.09 migrant(s)/1,000 population (2022 est.)

Age structure
- 0–14 years: 43.83%
- 65 and over: 3.06%

Sex ratio
- Total: 0.99 male(s)/female (2022 est.)
- At birth: 1.03 male(s)/female
- Under 15: 1.02 male(s)/female
- 65 and over: 0.62 male(s)/female

Nationality
- Nationality: Burundian

Language
- Official: Kirundi, French, English, Swahili

Demographic features of the population of Burundi include population density, ethnicity, education level, health of the populace, economic status, religious affiliations and other aspects.

Demographics of Burundi, Number of inhabitants in thousands.

At 206.1 persons per km^{2}, Burundi has the second-largest population density in Sub-Saharan Africa. Most people live on farms near areas of fertile volcanic soil. The population is made up of three major ethnic groups – Hutu (Bahutu), Tutsi (Batutsi or Watusi), and Twa (Batwa). Kirundi is the common language. Intermarriage takes place frequently between the Hutus and Tutsis. The terms "pastoralist" and "agriculturist", often used as ethnic designations for Watusi and Bahutu, respectively, are only occupational titles which vary among individuals and groups. Although Hutus encompass the majority of the population, historically Tutsis have been politically and economically dominant.

== Population ==
Estimated population, fertility rate and net reproduction rate by year according to United Nations estimates

According to the 2022 revision of the World Population Prospects, the total population was 11,891,000 in 2020, compared to only 2 309 000 in 1950. The proportion of children below the age of 15 in 2020 was 45.3%, 52.4% were between 15 and 65 years of age, while 2.4% of the population was 65 years or older.

	Total population	Population aged 0–14 (%)	Population aged 15–64 (%)	Population aged 65+ (%)
1950	2 309 000	40.9	55.9	3.2
1955	2 537 000	42.4	54.5	3.1
1960	2 798 000	43.8	53.2	2.9
1965	3 094 000	45.3	51.8	3.0
1970	3 479 000	45.5	51.5	3.0
1975	3 701 000	45.4	51.3	3.3
1980	4 157 000	44.7	52.2	3.1
1985	4 751 000	46.2	50.9	3.0
1990	5 439 000	47.9	49.3	2.8
1995	5 987 000	50.3	47.1	2.5
2000	6 379 000	50.1	47.4	2.5
2005	7 365 000	47.0	50.7	2.3
2010	8 676 000	45.1	52.7	2.2
2015	10 160 000	45.5	52.4	2.1
2020	11 891 000	45.3	52.4	2.4

Population Estimates by Sex and Age Group (01.VII.2015) (Unrevised data.):

Age group	Male	Female	Total	%
Total	4 822 838	5 000 990	9 823 828	100
0–4	856 714	855 769	1 712 483	17.43
5–9	679 740	699 260	1 379 000	14.04
10–14	604 457	629 629	1 234 086	12.56
15–19	496 353	525 562	1 021 915	10.40
20–24	467 123	507 522	974 645	9.92
25–29	397 323	446 043	843 366	8.58
30–34	321 348	337 758	659 106	6.71
35–39	236 115	230 446	466 561	4.75
40–44	182 701	183 765	366 466	3.73
45–49	153 796	156 798	310 594	3.16
50–54	134 933	130 247	265 180	2.70
55–59	113 470	111 808	225 278	2.29
60–64	74 556	70 655	145 211	1.48
65–69	44 744	46 041	90 785	0.92
70–74	25 722	28 826	54 548	0.56
75–79	16 056	20 164	36 220	0.37
80+	17 687	20 697	38 384	0.39
Age group	Male	Female	Total	Percent
0–14	2 140 911	2 184 658	4 325 569	44.03
15–64	2 577 718	2 700 604	5 278 322	53.73
65+	104 209	115 728	219 937	2.24

Population Estimates by Sex and Age Group (01.VII.2020):

Age group	Male	Female	Total	%
Total	6 080 391	6 229 209	12 309 600	100
0–4	874 372	864 599	1 738 971	14.13
5–9	869 861	865 182	1 735 043	14.10
10–14	813 776	816 817	1 630 593	13.25
15–19	635 015	647 234	1 282 249	10.42
20–24	536 485	556 280	1 092 765	8.88
25–29	496 482	527 430	1 023 911	8.32
30–34	443 784	481 580	925 364	7.52
35–39	360 774	378 666	739 439	6.01
40–44	268 219	268 291	536 510	4.36
45–49	190 837	196 746	387 583	3.15
50–54	163 759	171 797	335 555	2.73
55–59	140 489	143 340	283 830	2.31
60–64	118 050	122 024	240 075	1.95
65–69	82 201	86 101	168 302	1.37
70–74	43 526	48 289	91 815	0.75
75–79	24 811	30 186	54 997	0.45
80+	17 951	24 649	42 600	0.35
Age group	Male	Female	Total	Percent
0–14	2 558 009	2 546 598	5 104 607	41.47
15–64	3 353 893	3 871 836	7 225 729	58.70
65+	168 489	189 225	357 714	2.91

== UN population projections ==
Numbers are in thousands. UN medium variant projections

- 2020 11,891
- 2025 13,764
- 2030 15,773
- 2035 17,932
- 2040 20,253
- 2045 22,728
- 2050 25,325

== Vital statistics ==
Registration of vital events is in Burundi not complete. The Population Departement of the United Nations prepared the following estimates.

	Mid-year population	Live births	Deaths	Natural change	CBR (Note: CBR = crude birth rate (per 1000); CDR = crude death rate (per 1000); NC = natural change (per 1000); TFR = total fertility rate (number of children per woman); IMR = infant mortality rate per 1000 births)	CDR	NC	TFR	IMR	Life expectancy (years)
1950	2,254,000	116,000	53,000	63,000	51.3	23.5	27.8	6.92	166.9	40.6
1951	2,303,000	117,000	55,000	62,000	50.7	23.9	26.8	6.91	166.0	40.8
1952	2,352,000	118,000	56,000	62,000	49.9	23.8	26.1	6.90	164.0	41.0
1953	2,399,000	119,000	57,000	62,000	49.4	23.6	25.8	6.92	162.0	41.3
1954	2,447,000	120,000	57,000	63,000	48.9	23.3	25.5	6.92	160.1	41.6
1955	2,495,000	121,000	58,000	63,000	48.4	23.0	25.4	6.93	158.2	41.9
1956	2,544,000	122,000	58,000	64,000	47.9	22.8	25.1	6.93	156.4	42.1
1957	2,594,000	123,000	58,000	65,000	47.4	22.5	24.9	6.93	154.6	42.3
1958	2,643,000	125,000	59,000	66,000	47.0	22.2	24.8	6.95	152.8	42.6
1959	2,694,000	126,000	59,000	67,000	46.7	21.9	24.8	6.98	150.9	42.8
1960	2,747,000	128,000	60,000	68,000	46.5	21.7	24.8	7.00	149.0	43.0
1961	2,816,000	130,000	60,000	70,000	46.3	21.4	24.9	7.02	147.2	43.3
1962	2,887,000	135,000	61,000	73,000	46.5	21.2	25.3	7.04	145.3	43.4
1963	2,948,000	137,000	62,000	75,000	46.4	21.0	25.4	7.07	143.5	43.7
1964	3,033,000	140,000	63,000	77,000	46.3	20.7	25.5	7.09	141.7	44.0
1965	3,118,000	147,000	69,000	77,000	46.9	22.2	24.7	7.11	146.0	42.0
1966	3,193,000	150,000	67,000	82,000	46.9	21.1	25.7	7.14	144.3	43.5
1967	3,274,000	155,000	70,000	85,000	47.1	21.3	25.8	7.16	145.5	43.3
1968	3,352,000	158,000	72,000	87,000	47.2	21.3	25.9	7.18	146.3	43.4
1969	3,424,000	163,000	75,000	88,000	47.5	21.7	25.7	7.22	147.4	42.9
1970	3,498,000	166,000	76,000	90,000	47.3	21.6	25.7	7.21	147.9	43.0
1971	3,582,000	170,000	78,000	92,000	47.5	21.7	25.8	7.21	148.2	43.0
1972	3,579,000	173,000	145,000	28,000	47.6	39.9	7.7	7.21	161.2	25.6
1973	3,571,000	165,000	93,000	72,000	46.3	26.1	20.2	7.22	151.5	37.3
1974	3,660,000	171,000	79,000	92,000	46.7	21.5	25.2	7.22	148.4	43.0
1975	3,749,000	178,000	81,000	97,000	47.4	21.6	25.8	7.24	148.2	43.0
1976	3,831,000	182,000	82,000	100,000	47.5	21.5	26.0	7.25	147.4	43.1
1977	3,927,000	187,000	83,000	104,000	47.7	21.2	26.5	7.25	145.4	43.5
1978	4,039,000	194,000	85,000	110,000	48.2	21.0	27.2	7.26	142.3	43.8
1979	4,137,000	203,000	85,000	118,000	48.9	20.4	28.5	7.31	137.9	44.6
1980	4,313,000	207,000	84,000	123,000	48.9	19.8	29.1	7.35	132.5	45.4
1981	4,491,000	228,000	86,000	142,000	50.5	19.1	31.4	7.33	126.5	46.4
1982	4,602,000	229,000	85,000	144,000	49.7	18.5	31.2	7.31	120.5	47.3
1983	4,727,000	235,000	85,000	150,000	49.5	17.8	31.7	7.30	115.0	48.1
1984	4,842,000	237,000	84,000	152,000	48.8	17.4	31.4	7.30	110.0	48.5
1985	4,948,000	241,000	86,000	155,000	48.3	17.2	31.2	7.29	106.2	48.5
1986	5,042,000	242,000	88,000	155,000	47.8	17.3	30.5	7.32	103.7	48.2
1987	5,158,000	245,000	91,000	155,000	47.5	17.6	29.9	7.38	102.3	47.5
1988	5,272,000	250,000	109,000	141,000	47.2	20.6	26.7	7.38	105.5	43.0
1989	5,374,000	253,000	101,000	153,000	46.9	18.6	28.3	7.39	102.4	45.6
1990	5,484,000	256,000	105,000	151,000	46.5	19.1	27.5	7.37	103.0	44.9
1991	5,595,000	259,000	109,000	150,000	46.1	19.4	26.7	7.34	103.7	44.2
1992	5,743,000	262,000	112,000	150,000	45.7	19.5	26.2	7.30	104.2	43.9
1993	5,555,000	272,000	147,000	125,000	46.0	24.9	21.1	7.27	108.6	37.1
1994	5,586,000	208,000	101,000	107,000	39.1	18.9	20.2	7.23	104.4	44.1
1995	5,933,000	266,000	113,000	154,000	44.5	18.8	25.7	7.18	104.6	44.1
1996	5,931,000	265,000	112,000	153,000	43.9	18.6	25.3	7.12	104.2	44.4
1997	5,924,000	250,000	105,000	145,000	41.9	17.6	24.2	7.04	102.1	45.4
1998	6,035,000	249,000	100,000	149,000	41.3	16.6	24.7	6.96	99.8	46.6
1999	6,180,000	260,000	99,000	161,000	42.0	16.0	26.0	6.90	97.4	47.5
2000	6,308,000	269,000	101,000	168,000	42.5	15.9	26.6	6.87	95.3	47.5
2001	6,466,000	277,000	99,000	178,000	42.9	15.3	27.6	6.85	92.4	48.4
2002	6,649,000	292,000	97,000	195,000	43.8	14.5	29.3	6.82	89.1	49.9
2003	6,861,000	305,000	96,000	209,000	44.5	14.0	30.5	6.79	86.0	50.9
2004	7,120,000	322,000	95,000	227,000	45.3	13.4	31.9	6.75	82.4	52.0
2005	7,389,000	340,000	95,000	245,000	46.0	12.8	33.2	6.71	78.6	53.0
2006	7,658,000	355,000	95,000	260,000	46.4	12.4	34.0	6.66	74.4	53.9
2007	7,945,000	369,000	94,000	275,000	46.5	11.9	34.7	6.59	70.3	54.7
2008	8,278,000	384,000	93,000	291,000	46.6	11.3	35.2	6.52	66.4	55.7
2009	8,709,000	402,000	94,000	308,000	46.7	10.9	35.8	6.41	62.8	56.4
2010	9,127,000	426,000	96,000	330,000	46.7	10.5	36.2	6.26	59.4	57.1
2011	9,456,000	432,000	96,000	336,000	45.6	10.1	35.5	6.11	56.2	57.8
2012	9,795,000	435,000	94,000	340,000	44.4	9.6	34.8	5.99	53.3	58.5
2013	10,150,000	441,000	93,000	347,000	43.4	9.2	34.2	5.89	50.6	59.2
2014	10,495,000	445,000	92,000	352,000	42.4	8.8	33.6	5.79	48.2	59.9
2015	10,727,000	448,000	93,000	355,000	41.3	8.6	32.8	5.70	46.3	60.2
2016	10,903,000	432,000	90,000	343,000	39.5	8.2	31.3	5.59	44.4	60.8
2017	11,156,000	427,000	87,000	340,000	38.1	7.8	30.4	5.48	42.8	61.6
2018	11,493,000	424,000	88,000	336,000	37.0	7.6	29.4	5.38	41.3	61.7
2019	11,875,000	431,000	87,000	344,000	36.3	7.4	29.0	5.27	39.9	62.6
2020	12,441,000	452,000	91,000	362,000	35.9	7.2	28.7	5.18	38.8	62.6
2021	12,793,000	455,000	95,000	360,000	35.1	7.3	27.8	5.08	37.6	62.1
2022	13,138,000	457,000	93,000	364,000	34.3	7.0	27.3	4.98	36.5	62.9
2023	13,504,000	461,000	92,000	369,000	33.7	6.7	26.9	4.88	35.4	63.7

Source: UN DESA, World Population Prospects, 2022

View source data.
View source data.
View source data.
View source data.

=== Fertility ===
Total Fertility Rate (TFR) (Wanted Fertility Rate) and Crude Birth Rate (CBR):

Year	Total		Urban		Rural	
Year	CBR	TFR	CBR	TFR	CBR	TFR
1987		6.6 (5.3)		5.2 (4.2)		6.6 (5.4)
2010	44.5	6.4 (4.2)	37.3	4.8 (3.4)	45.3	6.6 (4.3)
2016–17	37.9	5.5 (3.6)	33.0	4.1 (3.0)	38.5	5.7 (3.7)

Fertility data as of 2010 (DHS Program): The fertility rate in the Bujumbura Mairie Province fell to 3.7 by 2016–2017; the other regions were not aggregated in the report, for easy reference and comparison to the below chart. Per the 2016-2017 report, the average number of desired children in Burundi, nationwide, by both men and women of 15 to 49 years of age who are either paired up or married, is 4 children or less, and slightly less for men than for women. Per the report, this suggests an excess fecundity (more children than desired) of 1.8 children per couple nationwide; 1.1 in urban areas (where 3.0 children are desired, and the fertility rate is 4.1) and 2.0 in rural areas (where 3.7 children are desired and the fertility rate is 5.7). However, the number of desired children appears to be based on the lowest-desired rate - that of paired but unmarried men (3.7 children) rather than the highest (4.0, desired by married women) or even an overall average.

Region	Total fertility rate	Percentage of women age 15-49 currently pregnant	Mean number of children ever born to women age 40–49
Bujumbura Mairie	4.2	7.9%	5.3
Nord	6.7	10.1%	6.4
Centre-Est	6.3	10.5%	6.6
Ouest	7.1	11.7%	7.2
Sud	6.2	10.8%	6.8

Years	1925	1926	1927	1928	1929	1930	1931	1932	1933	1934
Total Fertility Rate in Burundi	6.81	6.81	6.81	6.81	6.81	6.81	6.81	6.81	6.81	6.81

Years	1935	1936	1937	1938	1939	1940	1941	1942	1943	1944
Total Fertility Rate in Burundi	6.81	6.81	6.81	6.82	6.82	6.82	6.82	6.82	6.82	6.82

Years	1945	1946	1947	1948	1949
Total Fertility Rate in Burundi	6.82	6.82	6.82	6.82	6.82

== Ethnic groups ==
Hutu (Bantu) 85%, Tutsi 14%, Twa (Pygmy) 1% Europeans 3,000, South Asians 2,000

== Languages ==
Kirundi (official) only: 29.7%, French (official) only: 0.3%, Kirundi and French: 8.4%, Kurundi, French and English: 2.4%, Swahili only: 0.2%, other language combinations: 2%, unspecified: 56.9% (2008 est.)
NOTE: Data represents only languages read and written by people 10 years of age or older; spoken Kirundi is nearly universal.

== Religion ==
Roman Catholic 62.1%, Protestant 23.9% (includes Adventist 2.3% and other Protestant 21.6%), Islam 2.5%, Other 3.6%, Unspecified 7.9% (2008 est.)
