= List of protected areas of Burundi =

The country of Burundi in Africa has the following national parks and other protected areas.

== National parks ==
- Kibira National Park
- Ruvubu National Park
- Rusizi National Park

== Nature reserves ==
- Bururi Forest Nature Reserve
- Kigwena Natural Reserve
- Lake Rwihinda Natural Reserve (Lac aux Oiseaux)
- Rumonge Nature Reserve
- Rusizi Nature Reserve
- Vyanda Forest Nature Reserve

== Natural monuments ==
- Chutes de la Karera (Karera Waterfalls Natural Monument)
- German Gorge - Faille des Allemands

== See also ==
- Tourism in Burundi
