= Wildlife of Burundi =

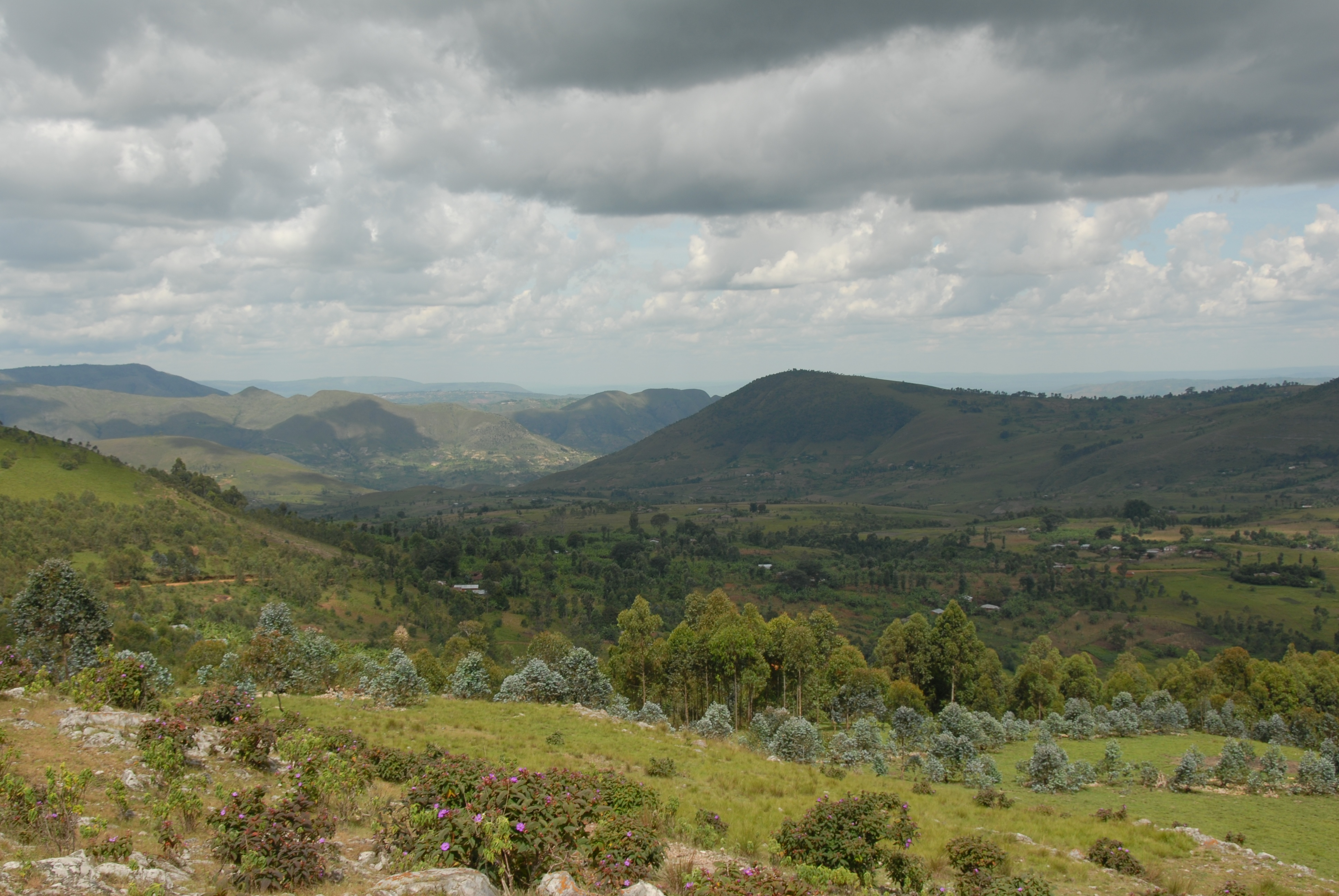
Landscapes of Burundi.

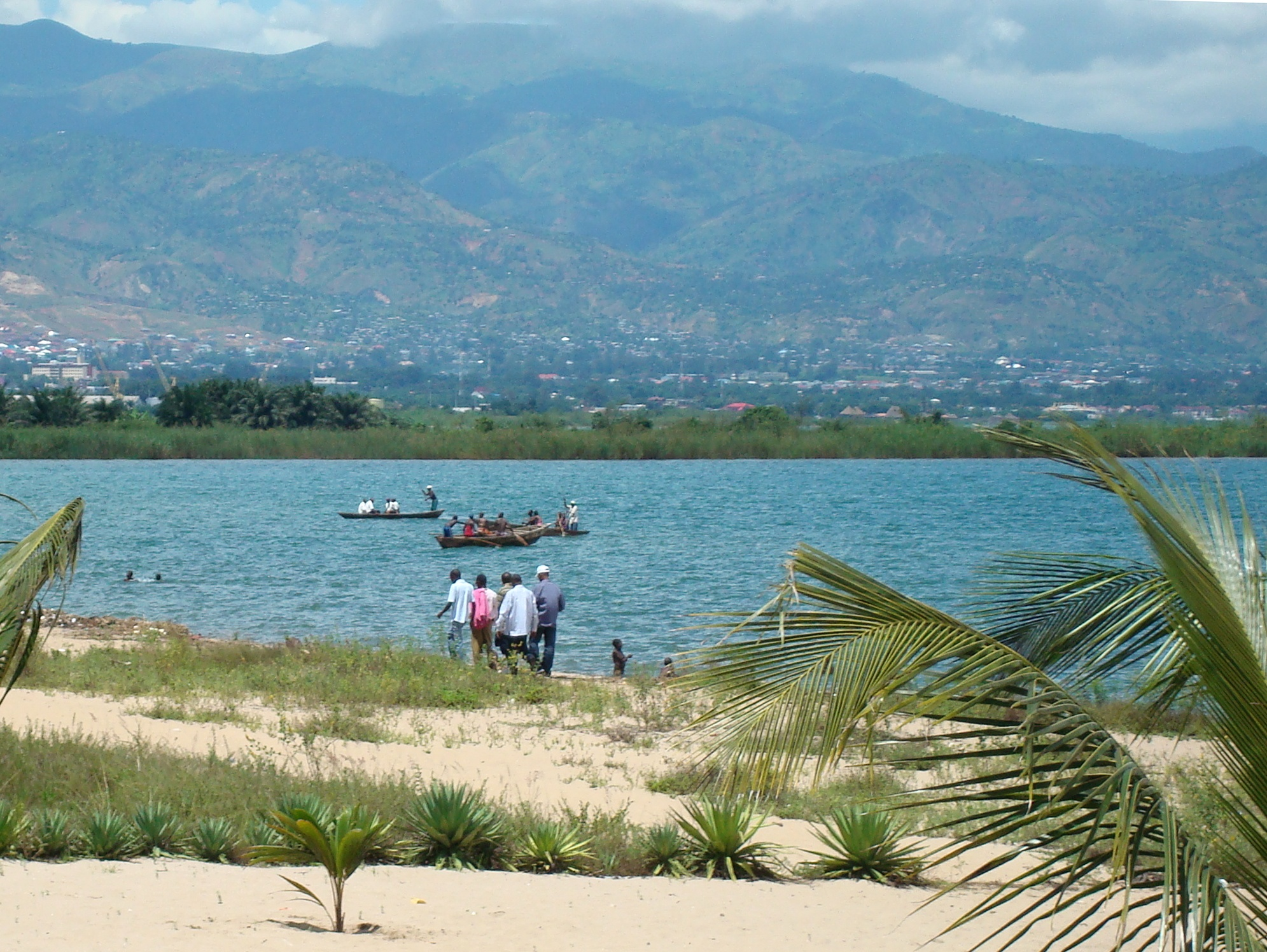
Bujumbura on the banks of Lake Tanganyika.

The wildlife of Burundi is composed of its flora and fauna. The small, landlocked country is home to 2,950 species of plants, 596 birds, 163 species of mammals, 52 species of reptiles, 56 species of amphibians, and 215 fish species. The wildlife has been drastically reduced in recent years, mainly on account of intense population pressure, conversion of large areas of forest into agricultural land, and extensive livestock farming. The protected area encompasses little more than 5% of the total area of the country.

== Legal status ==
With one exception, there were no national laws on conservation of wildlife during the colonial rule of Belgium nor any national parks established. The exception was a forest reserve, established in 1933. Before 1980, little action was taken to protect wildlife. The first Act issued was Decree No. 1/6, dated 3 March 1980, under which national parks (parc nationaux) and reserves were proposed to preserve and conserve wildlife. Under this decree, forest boundaries were to be defined. The Forest Code of 25 March 1985 was an enabling law under which protected forest areas were decreed, and reserve areas were specified. A national institute for conservation was established, the National Institute for the Conservation of Nature, under the decree of March 1980; now renamed as the National Institute for Environment and Conservation of Nature. It has the responsibility to establish national parks and reserves. It also undertakes some significant research in flora and fauna as well as promoting ecotourism.

== Habitat ==
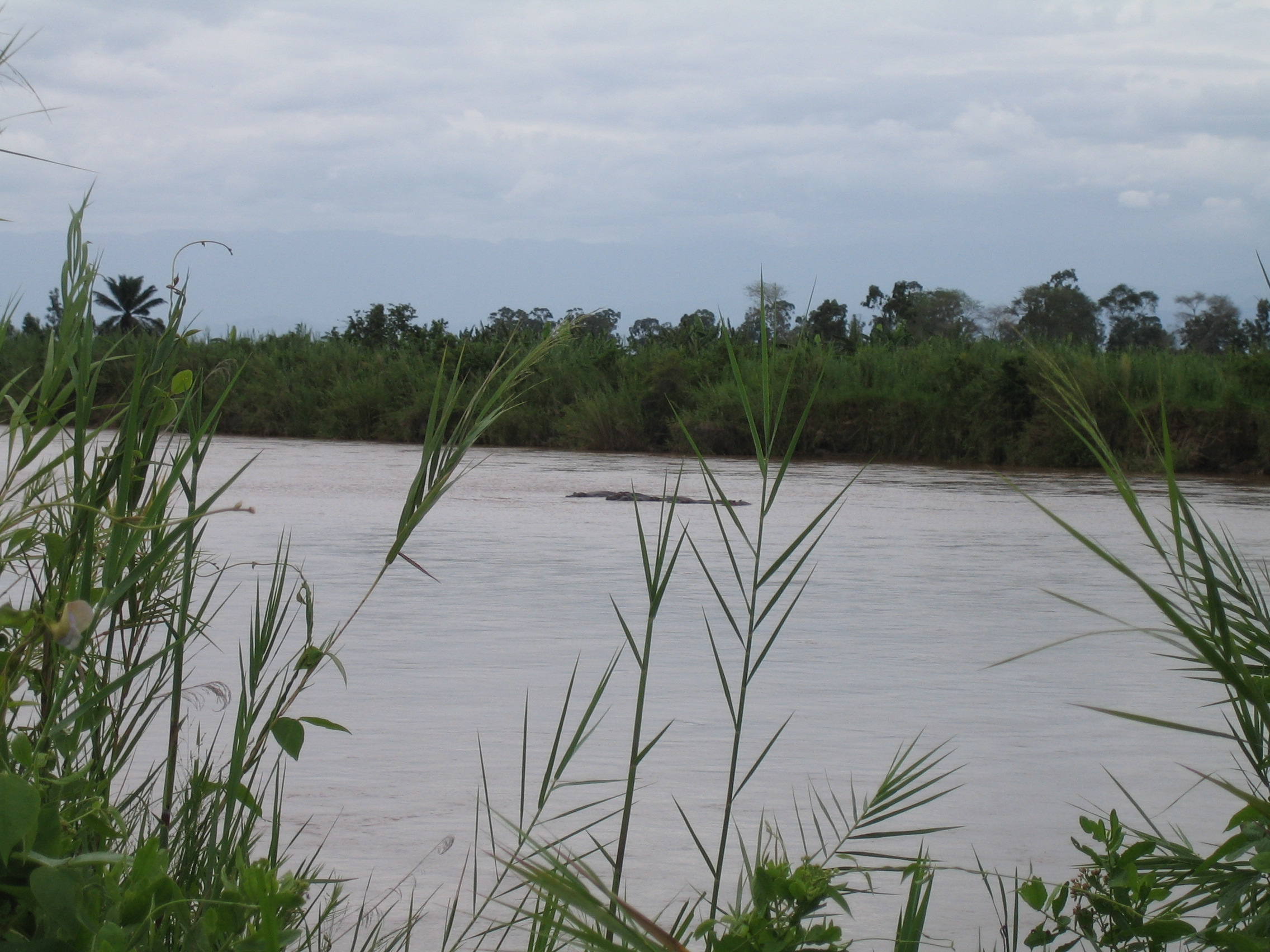
Rusizi River.

The wildlife habitat of Burundi, spread over its 15 provinces, is effected by the moderate tropical climate, dominated by variation in elevation. An average annual temperature of 20 °C (68 °F) is recorded in the plateau region while the Rift Valley records a temperature of 23 °C (73 °F). Dry season lasts from June to August and again from December to January. The rainy season is from October to December with annual rainfall varying from 500–2,000 millimetres (20–79 in); Bujumbura, the largest city and former capital, has an average rainfall of 960 millimetres (38 in). The western mountain region receives an average rainfall of 1,375 millimetres (54.1 in); the eastern plateaus, however, receive an annual rainfall in the range of 1,100–1,250 millimetres (43–49 in). The country is dominated by hilly plateaus. The elevation in the plateau varies from 1,400–1,800 metres (4,600–5,900 ft) with the decreasing trend recorded towards the east and southeast of the country. Its biodiversity is broadly categorized under the terrestrial ecosystems, and the aquatic and semi-aquatic ecosystems. The western area of the country is narrow and borders Lake Tanganyika, formed by the trough of the Rift Valley and the Rusizi River (formed by the border with DR Congo). The western region of the country is formed by the hilly terrain of the Congo-Nile Divide, with many hills lying above 2,500 metres (8,200 ft) elevation; the highest mountains are Mount Teza at 2,665 metres (8,743 ft) and Mount Heha at 2,670 metres (8,760 ft). The central plateau (about 2,100 metres (6,900 ft) in elevation) forms the middle part of the country. In the southeast, the Malagarasi River flows through the Kumoso depression and borders Tanzania. The northern part of the country is formed of lowland in the Bweru Bugesera region and has two lakes, Cohoha and Rweru; this region is distinct for its Cyperus papyrus vegetation. The forest area is limited to 127,662 hectares (315,460 acres), and the wetlands account for 120,000 hectares (300,000 acres) (about 5% of the total area of the country). The montane forest, which occupied nearly 33 to 50% of the country in the past, is mostly denuded and only a patch of 800 hectares (2,000 acres) of closed forest is recorded on the banks of Lake Tanganyika. Lake Tanganyika, the second-deepest lake in the world, has a water spread of only 8% in Burundi. Other rivers are the Malagarisi and the Ruvuvu. Ruviyaronza, an upper branch of the Kagera River, is the head stream of the Nile which rises in Burundi. The river systems of the country fall under the two main hydrographical basins of the Nile and the Congo Basin. The dominant vegetation that encompasses most of the habitats is of savanna. Acacia, eucalyptus, and oil palm trees are common.

== Protected areas ==
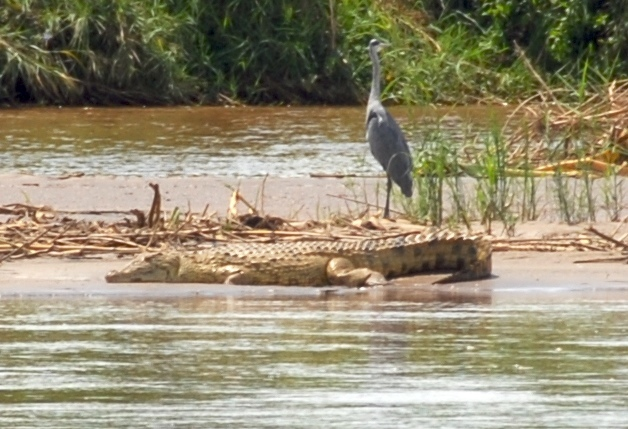
View of Rusizi National Park in 2007

There are three national parks in Burundi:

- Kibira National Park is 40,000 hectares (99,000 acres) in size and contains the country's largest rainforest and borders Rwanda's Nyungwe National Park.
- Ruvubu National Park covers 50,800 hectares (126,000 acres), making it the largest park in the country. It is known for its hiking trails and has expansive views.
- Rusizi National Park covers 9,000 hectares (22,000 acres), 15 kilometres (9.3 mi) from Bujumbura (the former capital of Burundi). It is wetland, with hippos, sitatunga (aquatic antelopes) and many species of birds. Declared a national park in 1990, it is situated in the flood plains of the Rusizi River in the outer limits of Bujumbura.

Apart from the national parks, there are four reserves:

- Lac Rwihinda Nature Reserve – 8,000 hectares (20,000 acres)
- Bururi Forest Nature Reserve – 3,300 hectares (8,200 acres) (which has the last vestiges of montane forest in the country)
- Rumonge Nature Reserve – 5,000 hectares (12,000 acres)
- Kigwena Forest Nature Reserve – 800 hectares (2,000 acres)

In addition, there are two natural monuments: Chutes de la Kagera and Nyakazu Gorge.

== Flora ==
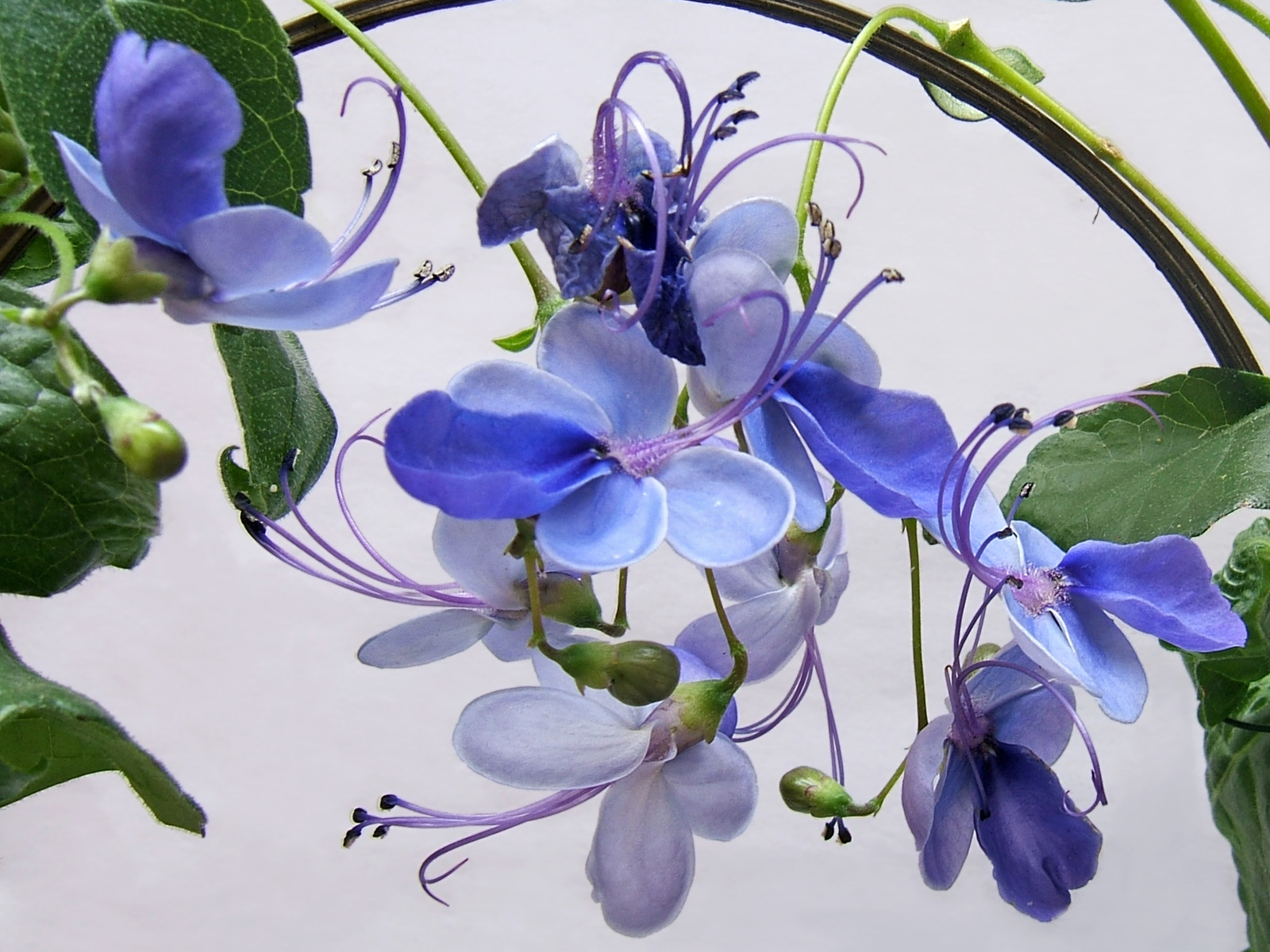
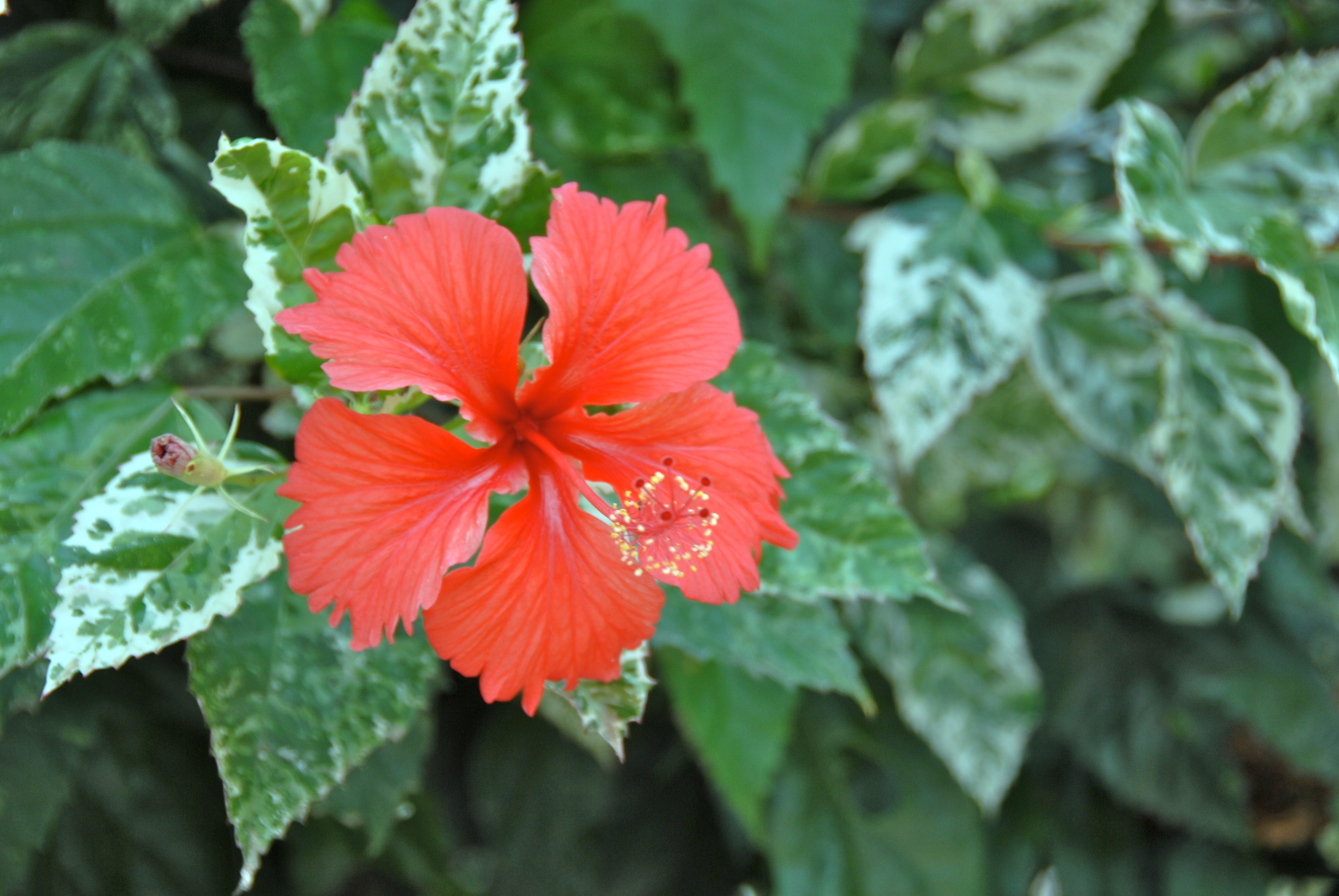
Left: Rotheca myricoides or butterfly bush. Right: Bujumbura flower.

The flora is characterized by East African evergreen bushland and secondary grassland, as well as Afromontane vegetation including transitional rainforests in the western mountain region. Hyphaene–Acacia and Brachystegia trees are noted in the lake shores. The Brachystegia–Julbernardia (miombo) trees are seen in south-eastern border area. The Bugesera region in the north and the Kumoso depression on the east have profuse vegetation of Acacia–Combretum trees, and Brachystegia trees. The vascular flora reported is of 2,950 species under 195 families. In the high altitude in particular many species of wild flora are reported to be endemic; 70 species of plants are reported in this category.

== Fauna ==
There are 163 species of mammals, 52 species of reptiles, 56 species of amphibians and 215 species of fish. It is also reported that at high altitudes, endemicity is distinct in 17 species of mammals and 22 species of birds. Lake Tanganyika has 200 species of fish and an equal number of molluscs. A scientific exploration team of the University of Texas at El Paso found the Bururi long-fingered frog (Cardioglossa cyaneospila) (considered extinct for decades), in December 2011 in the Bururi Forest Nature Reserve, after it was last seen in 1949. Seven important species of fauna reported are Genetta piscivora (aquatic genet), Serinus mozambicus (yellow-fronted canary), Cercopithecus lhoesti (L'hoest's monkey), Agapornis fischeri (Fischer's lovebird), Galago moholi (South African galago), Hyperolius viridiflavus, and Hippopotamus amphibius (hippopotamus).

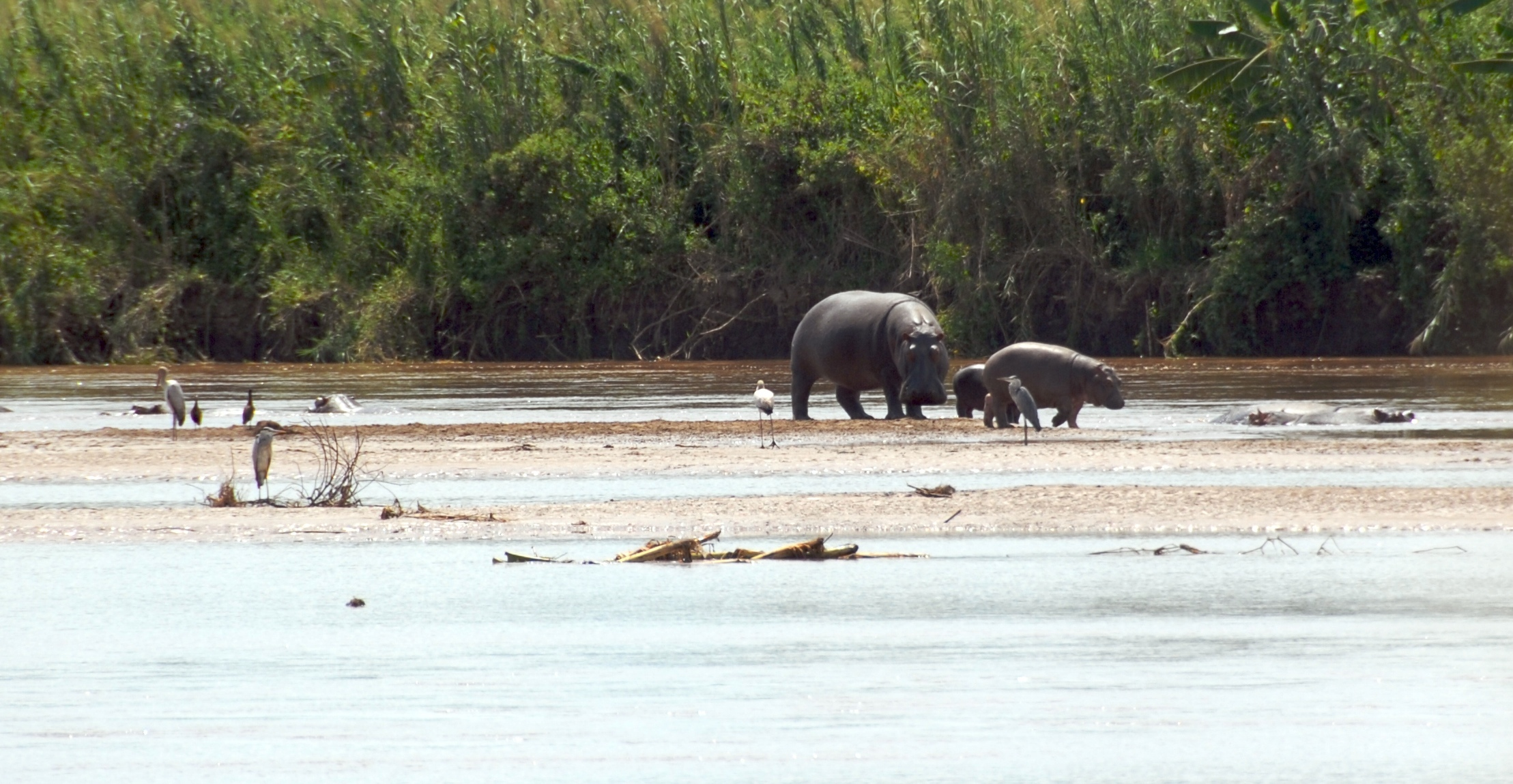
Hippopotamus at Rusizi.

The species reported under endangered and vulnerable categories (as per the IUCN's 2004 Red List) are the following: chimpanzee (Pan troglodytes) (EN), African wild dog (Lycaon pictus) (EN), African golden cat (Profelis aurata) (VU), Carruther's mountain squirrel (Funisciurus carruthersi) (VU), cheetah (Acinonyx jubatus) (VU), lion (Panthera leo) (VU), Ruwenzori shrew (Ruwenzorisorex suncoides) (VU), and spotted-necked otter (Lutra maculicollis) (VU).

=== Mammals ===
There are four subspecies of the African buffalo (Syncerus caffer), of which the Cape subspecies S. c. caffer found in Burundi number only about 500 now. Sitatunga (Tragelaphus speldi) were once found in many swamps in Burundi, but by the 1980s their numbers had dwindled, and the species' present conservation status is unknown. Waterbuck (Kobus ellipsiprymnus), also called the defassa waterbuck, was found throughout Burundi in the savanna grass land, then became restricted to the Ruvibu National Park. Only were reported in the 1980s and its present status is unknown. Lichtenstein's hartebeest (Alcelaphus Lichtensteinii) occurred in the southeast. Korrigum (also tsessebe, topi or tiang), Damaliscus lunatus, which were found in the eastern flood plains and savanna grasslands, is now extirpated. Impala (Aepyeros melampus), which once inhabited the eastern savannas, is also extirpated. Oribi (Ourebia ourebi), which occurred in the eastern and southern savanna and flood plains, is probably extirpated. Klipspringer (Oreotragus oreotragus), found in rocky outcrops in the south and east, is now extirpated. Grey duiker (Sylvicapra grimmia) is found in large numbers in spite of extensive hunting in the eastern and southern savannas. It is found in Ruvubu National Park.

=== Birds ===
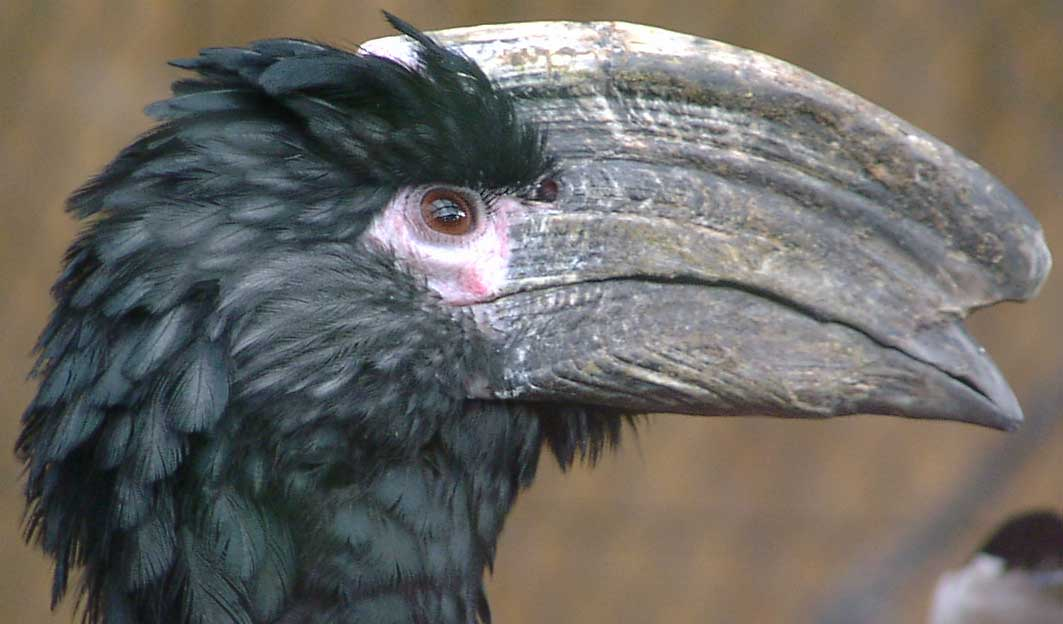
Trumpeter hornbill

Reported avifauna include 596 species (439 resident and 109 seasonal migrants) of which 13 species of global conservation concern and three are introduced species; more species have been found but their details are not recorded (thus UNEP reports 716 species). There are no endemic bird species. There are five Important Bird Areas (IBAs) declared by BirdLife International in the country, which cover an area of 1,018 square kilometres (393 sq mi) and which account for 3.7% of the total area of the country. These coalesce with the national parks and two forest (or nature) reserves. According to BirdLife International, there are 13 species of global conservation concern (six of non-breeding migrants, and balance of breeding type from Albertine Rift and papyrus swamps). These include Phoenicopterus minor (NT), Circus macrourus (NT), Falco naumanni (VU), Gallinago media (NT), Glareola nordmanni (NT), Ardeola idea (NT), Lybius rubrifacies (NT), Kupeornis rufocinctus (NT), Laniarius mufumbiri (NT), Balaeniceps rex (NT), Apalis argentea (VU), Bradypterus graueri (VU), Cryptospiza shelleyi (VU), Calamonastides gracilirostris (VU), and Bugeranus carunculatus (VU).

== Environment ==
Deforestation is a major problem in Burundi, with trees being cut down for fuel or for agricultural clearing; as a result, there is very little natural forest vegetation remaining. Government conservation efforts are minimal, and only 5.4 percent of Burundi's land mass is officially protected. In 2005, the government announced a ban on natural Christmas trees, claiming that around 80,000 conifers per year were lost to the Christmas trade. Much of Burundi's wildlife is threatened with extinction, due to poaching and habitat loss. Gorillas and elephants are already completely extinct in the region.

== Bibliography ==
- Appiah, Kwame Anthony; Gates, Jr., Henry Louis (2010). Encyclopaedia of Africa. Oxford University Press. ISBN 978-0-19-533770-9.
- East, Rod (1999). African Antelope Database 1998. IUCN. ISBN 978-2-8317-0477-7.
- Ham, Anthony; Bewer, Tim; Butler, Stuart; Carillet, Jean-Bernard; Paul Clammer; Matthew D Firestone; Mary Fitzpatrick; Katharina Lobeck Kane; Kate Thomas (1 September 2010). Lonely Planet Africa. Lonely Planet. p. 640. ISBN 978-1-74220-308-9.
- Kanyamibwa, Samuel; Weghe, Jean-Pierre Vande. "Burundi" (PDF). BirdLife International Organization. Archived from the original (pdf) on 8 January 2013.
- UNEP. "National Biosafety Framework in Burundi" (PDF). UNEP Organization. Archived from the original (pdf) on 17 March 2008.
- World Conservation Monitoring Centre (1991). Protected Areas of the World: Afrotropical. IUCN. ISBN 978-2-8317-0092-2.
