= List of World Heritage Sites in Burundi =

The United Nations Educational, Scientific and Cultural Organization (UNESCO) World Heritage Sites are places of importance to cultural or natural heritage nominated by signatory countries to the World Heritage Convention of 1972. Cultural heritage comprises monuments (such as architectural works, monumental sculptures, or inscriptions), groups of buildings, and sites (including archaeological ones). Natural heritage comprises natural features (such as physical and biological formations), geological and physiographical formations (including habitats of threatened flora and fauna), and natural sites which are important for scientific research, conservation or natural aesthetic. Burundi accepted the convention on 19 May 1982, making its cultural and natural heritage sites eligible for inclusion on the list. There are no World Heritage Sites in the country, but there are 10 on the tentative list.

== Tentative list ==
UNESCO lists sites under ten criteria; each entry must meet at least one of the criteria. Criteria i through vi are cultural, and vii through x are natural. In addition to sites inscribed on the World Heritage List, member states can maintain a list of tentative sites for nomination consideration. Nominations for the list are only accepted if the site had been on the tentative list. Burundi has 10 properties on its tentative list.

World Heritage Sites
Site	Image	Location (province)	UNESCO data	Year listed	Description
Rusizi natural reserve	An aerial picture of a muddy river meeting a larger blue body of water	Bujumbura	vii, ix (natural)	2007	
Gasumo, the southernmost source of the Nile	A man on a rock overlooking the forests surrounding Gasumo	Burunga	vii (natural)	2007	
The sacred natural landscapes of Muramvya, Mpotsa and Nkiko-Mugamba		Butanyerera and Gitega	vi, vii (mixed)	2007	
The Lakes of Northern Burundi	Two trees	Butanyerera	x (natural)	2026	
Kibira National Park		Bujumbura and Butanyerera	viii, ix, x (natural)	2026	
The Karera Falls	Jagged rocks created by the waterfall, with trees surrounding it.	Burunga	vi, vii, x (mixed)	2026	
Ruvubu National Park	A landscape with a cloudy blue sky, many lakes and a forest	Buhumuza	ix, x (natural)	2026	
The Nyakazu Fault		Burunga	iii, vii, viii (mixed)	2026	
Lake Tanganyika	A satellite image of the Burundian part of Lake Tanganyika	Bujumbura and Burunga	vii, ix, x (natural)	2026	
Royal Residence of Gishora		Gitega	i, iii, iv, vi (cultural)	2026	

== See also ==
- List of World Heritage Sites in Africa
  - List of World Heritage Sites in the Democratic Republic of the Congo
  - List of World Heritage Sites in Kenya
  - List of World Heritage Sites in Rwanda
  - List of World Heritage Sites in Tanzania
  - List of World Heritage Sites in Uganda
