= Tourism in Burundi =

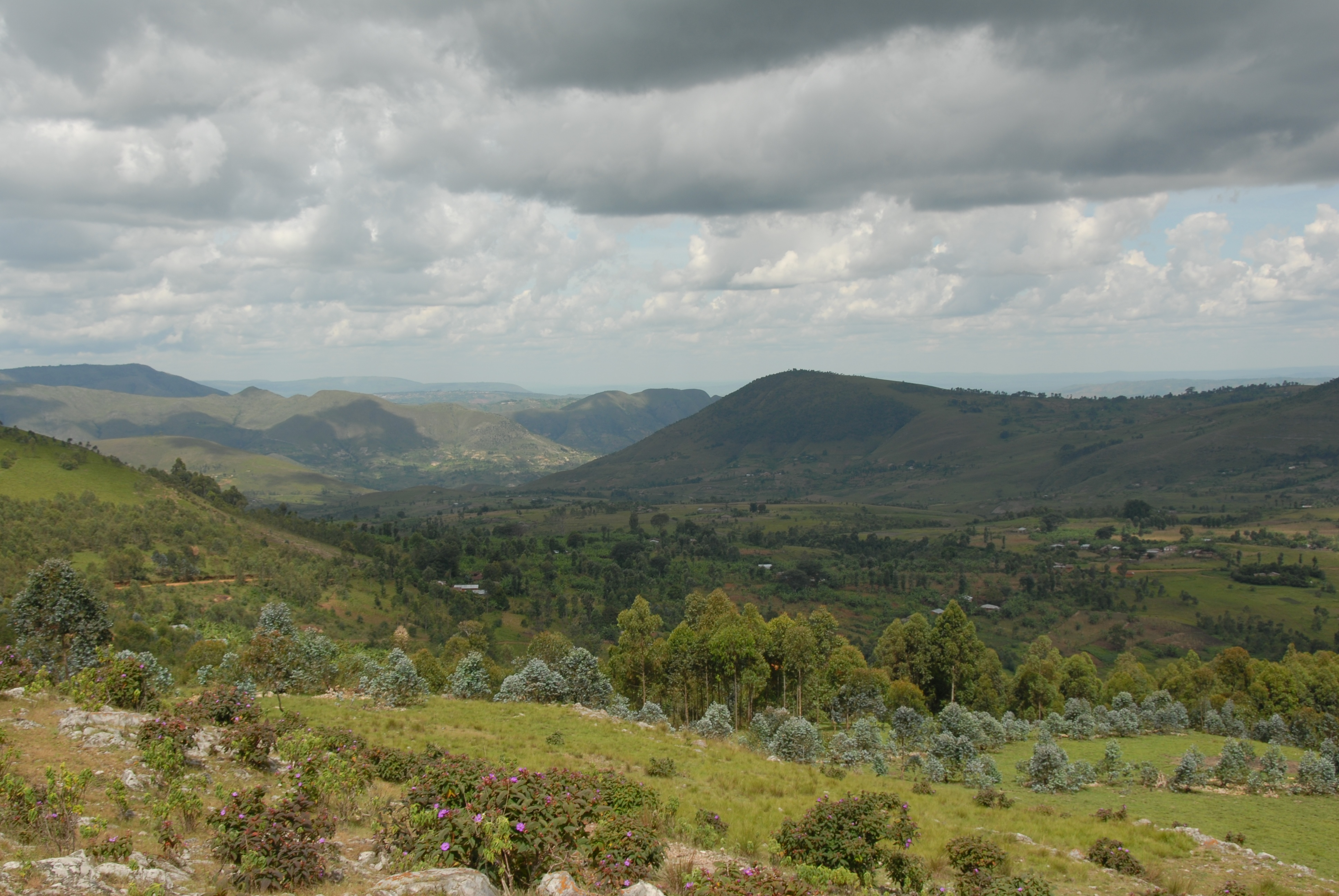
Landscape of Burundi.

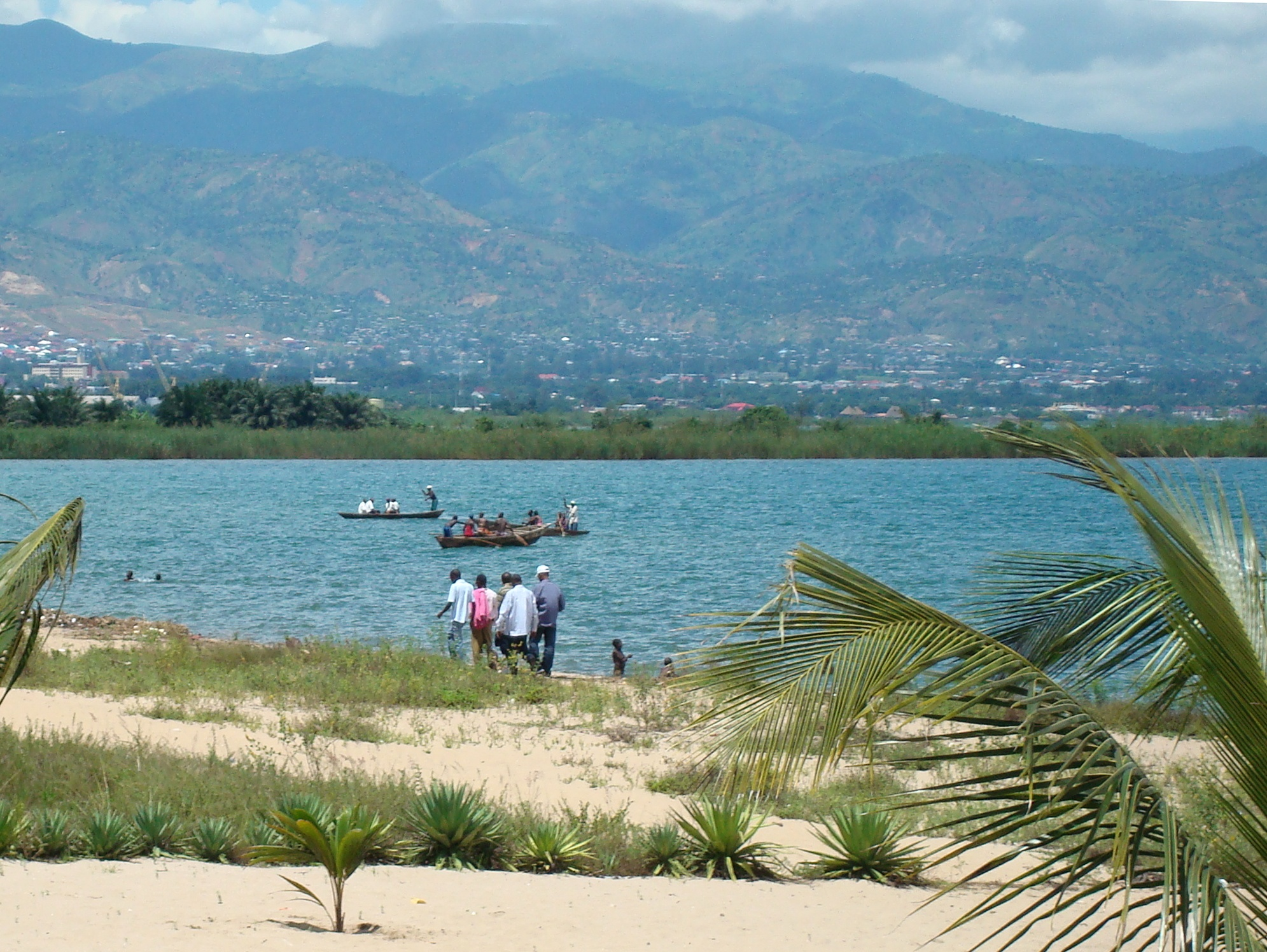
Bujumbura on the banks of Lake Tanganyika.

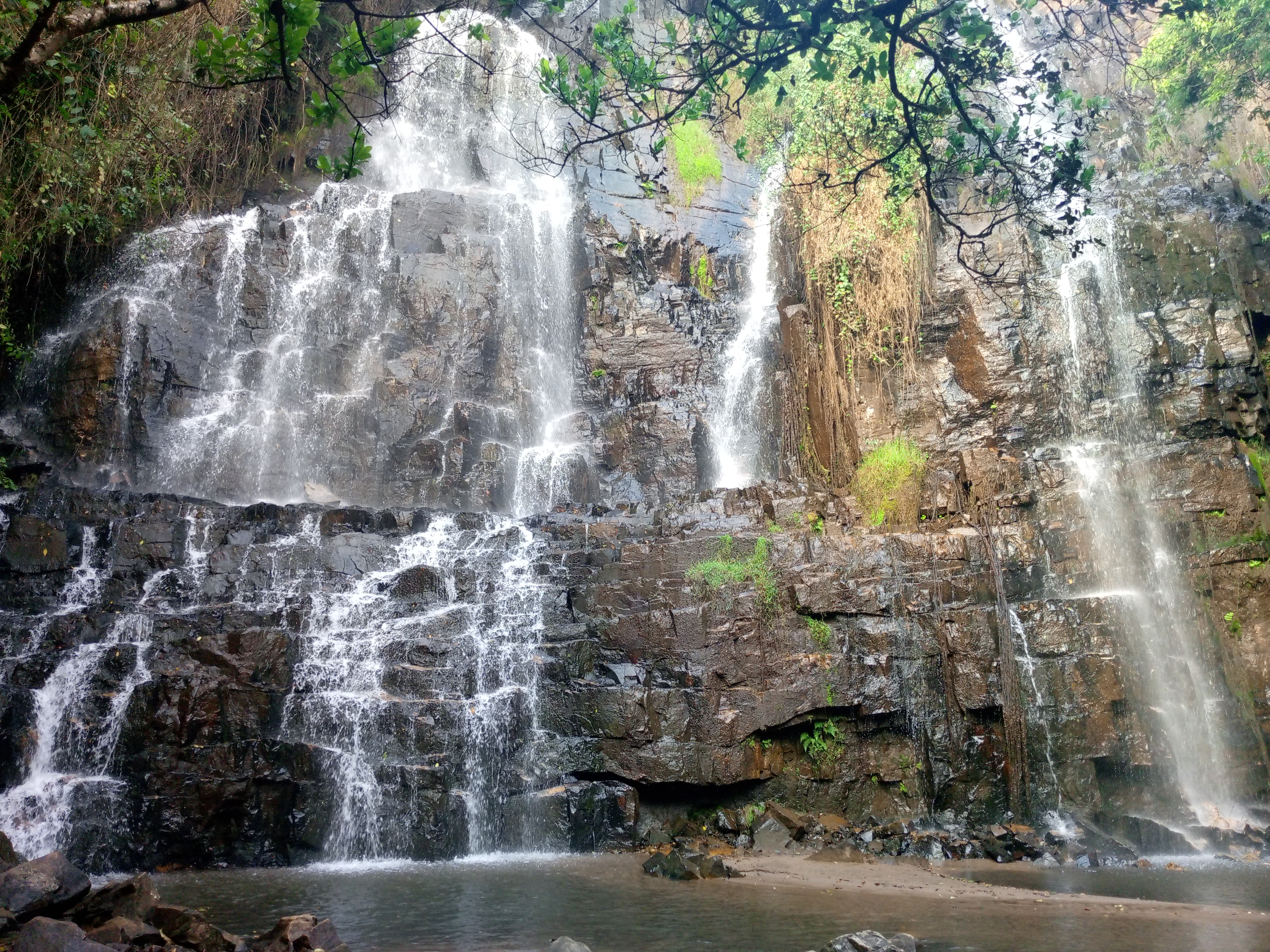
View of the Karera waterfalls.

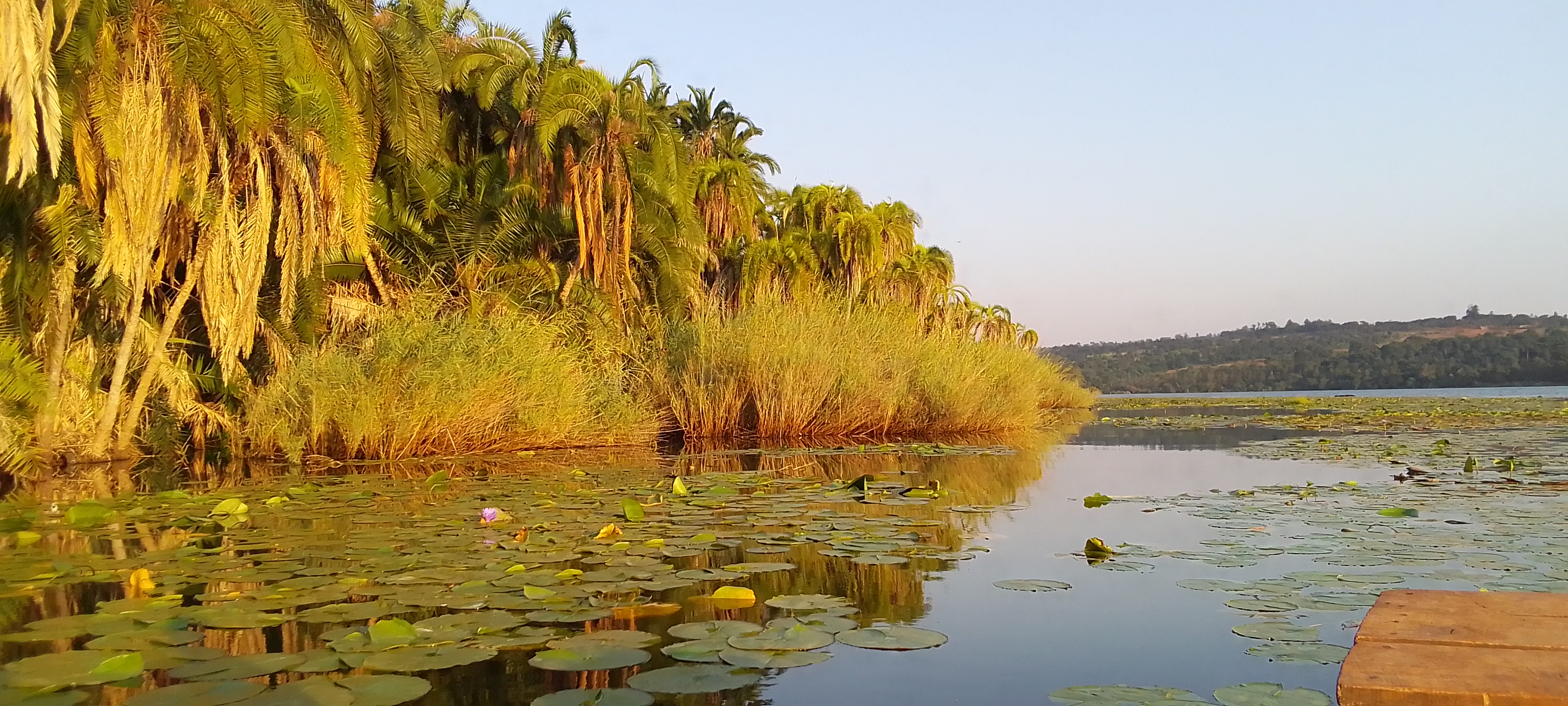
Trees beside Lake Rwihinda, often called Bird Lake ("Lac aux oiseaux" in French)

Tourism in Burundi refers to tourism in Burundi. Bujumbura, the largest city and former capital of Burundi, is a major tourist attraction of the country. In addition to this, Lake Tanganyika is a popular tourist attraction.

The national tourism board also host an official website where details extensive details about the country, the environment and culture can be found. (https://tourisme.gov.bi/en/home/)

== Industry ==
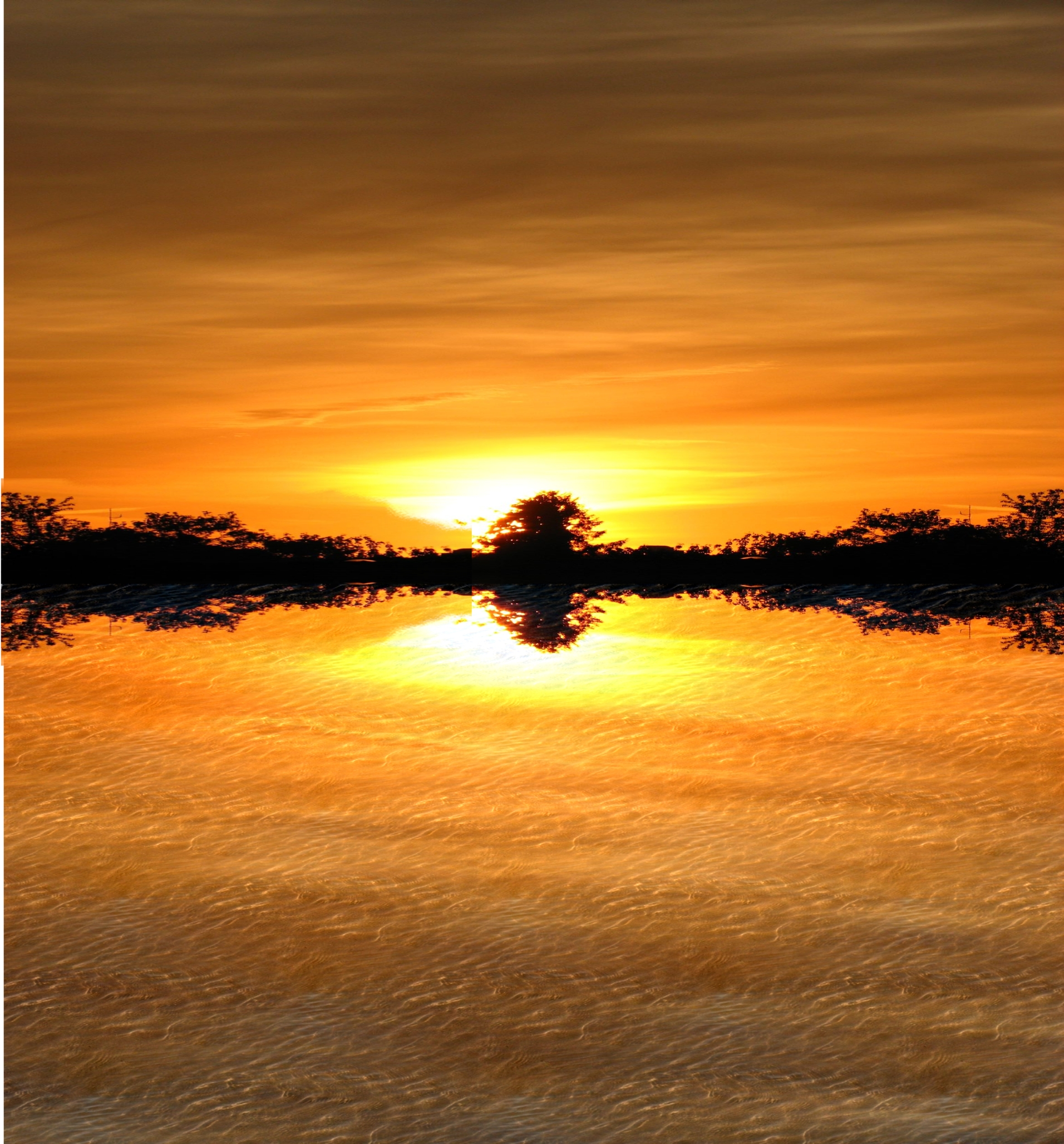
Lake Tanganyika, one of Burundi's most popular tourist attractions

Burundi has vast natural resources and wildlife, but the tourism industry of Burundi is underdeveloped. Tourism has a marginal share in GDP of the nation. Direct contributions of travel and tourism industry to the country's GDP was 2.1% in 2013 and 2% in 2014. According to World Bank data, the number of international tourists increased in the 2000s. In 2000, nearly 29,000 international tourists visited Burundi, the number increased to 148,000 in 2005. Number of tourists peaked at 214,000 in 2006; by 2010, only 142,000 tourists had visited the country. While the tourism sector is small but growing, ongoing unrest has decimated tourism in the country.

Tourism infrastructure is very poor in Burundi. The options for transport and accommodation for tourists are limited. In 2010, the Burundian government planned a 20-year infrastructure development plan in partnership with the African Development Bank to improve tourism infrastructure in the country. The funding also came from other donor nations and organizations.

== Advisories ==
Yellow fever vaccination is necessary before visiting Burundi. Malaria is endemic in Burundi, while vaccination for cholera may also be required when visiting Burundi.

== Attractions ==
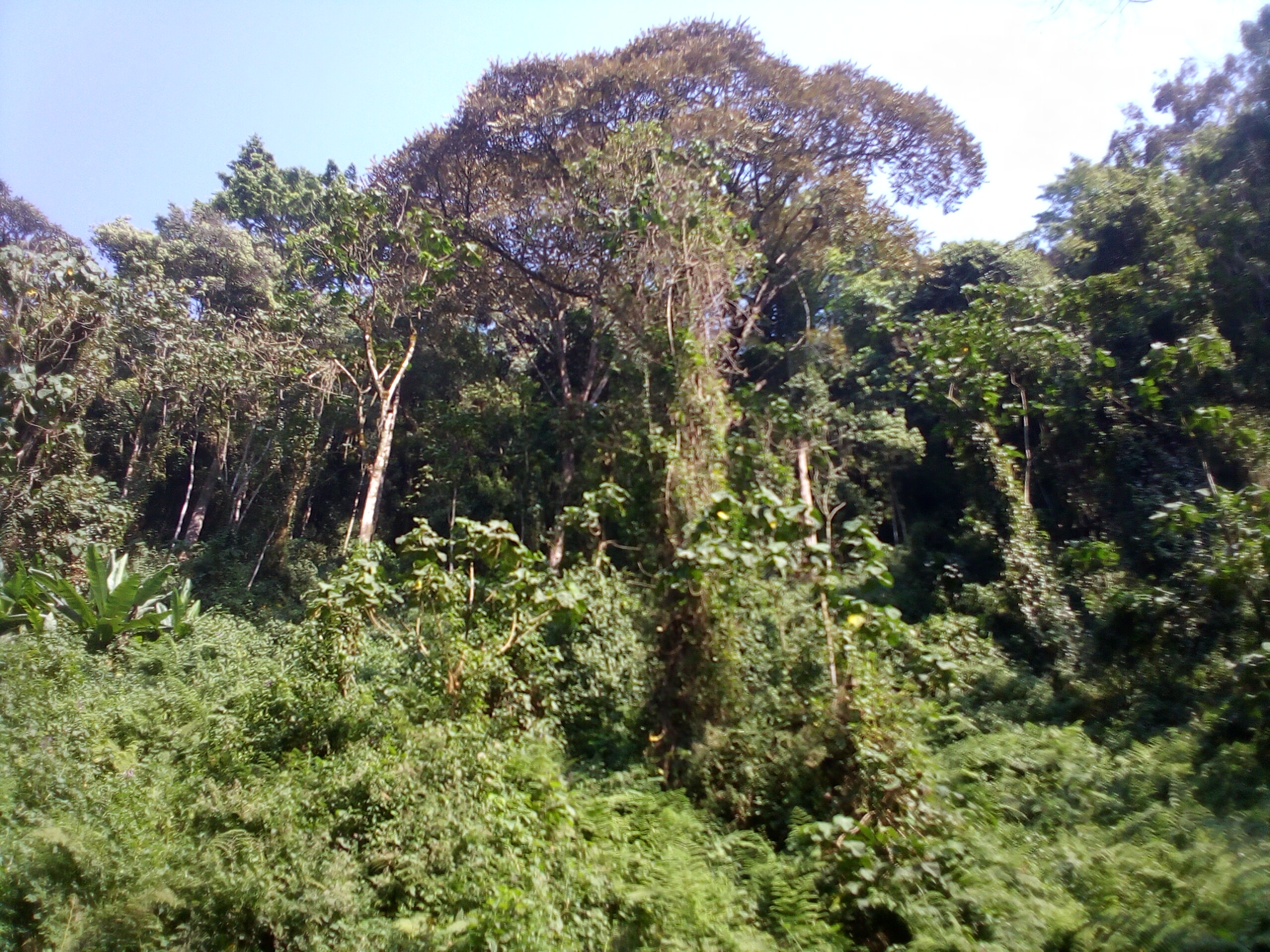
View of the Kibira National Park

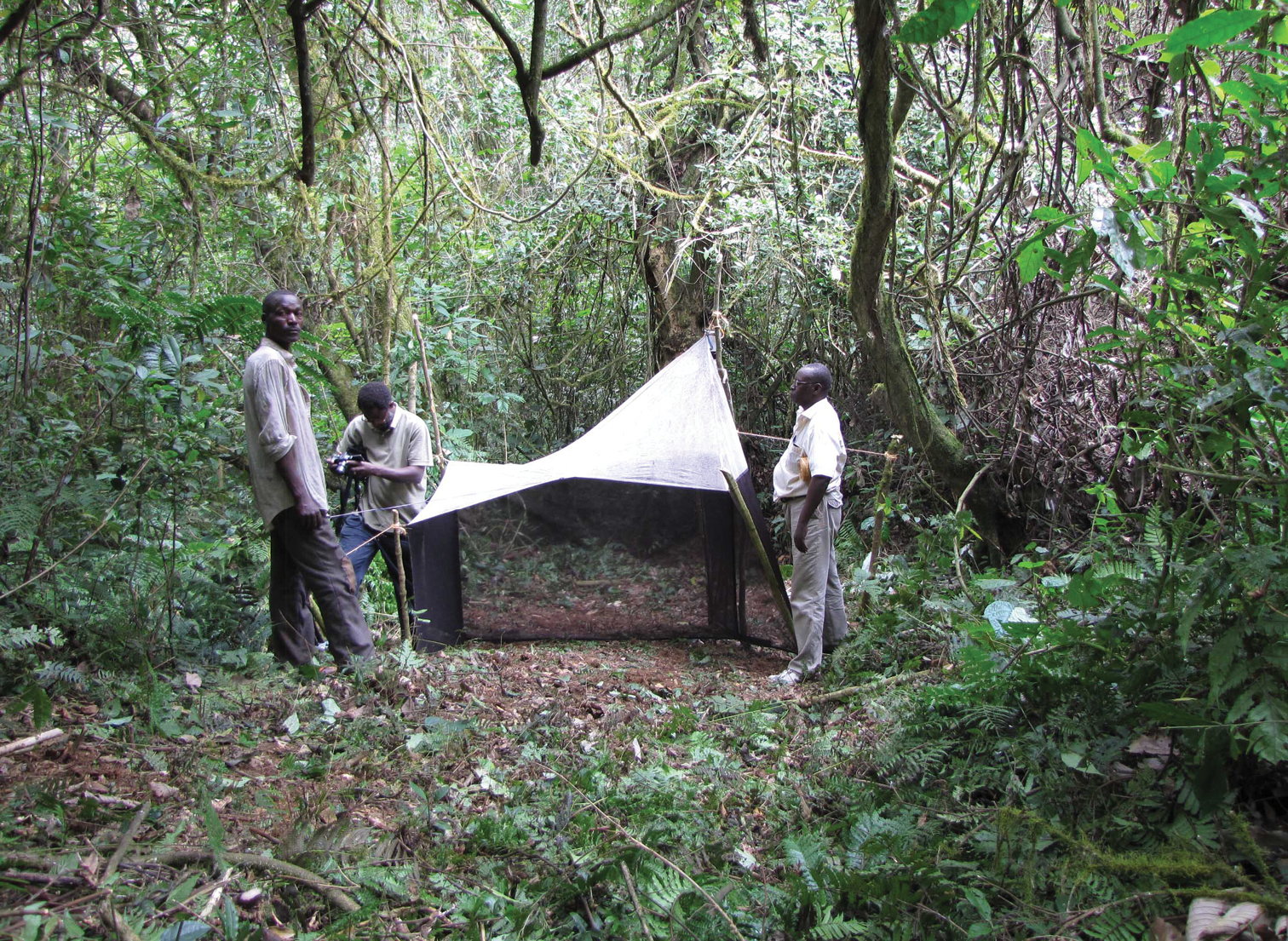
Inside the Bururi Forest Nature Reserve.

Ecotourism is one of the major areas of tourism in Burundi. Kibira National Park, Rurubu River and Lake Tanganyika are considered major natural habitats for wildlife. There are also numerous wildfowl lakes, such as Rwihinda Lake Natural Reserve.

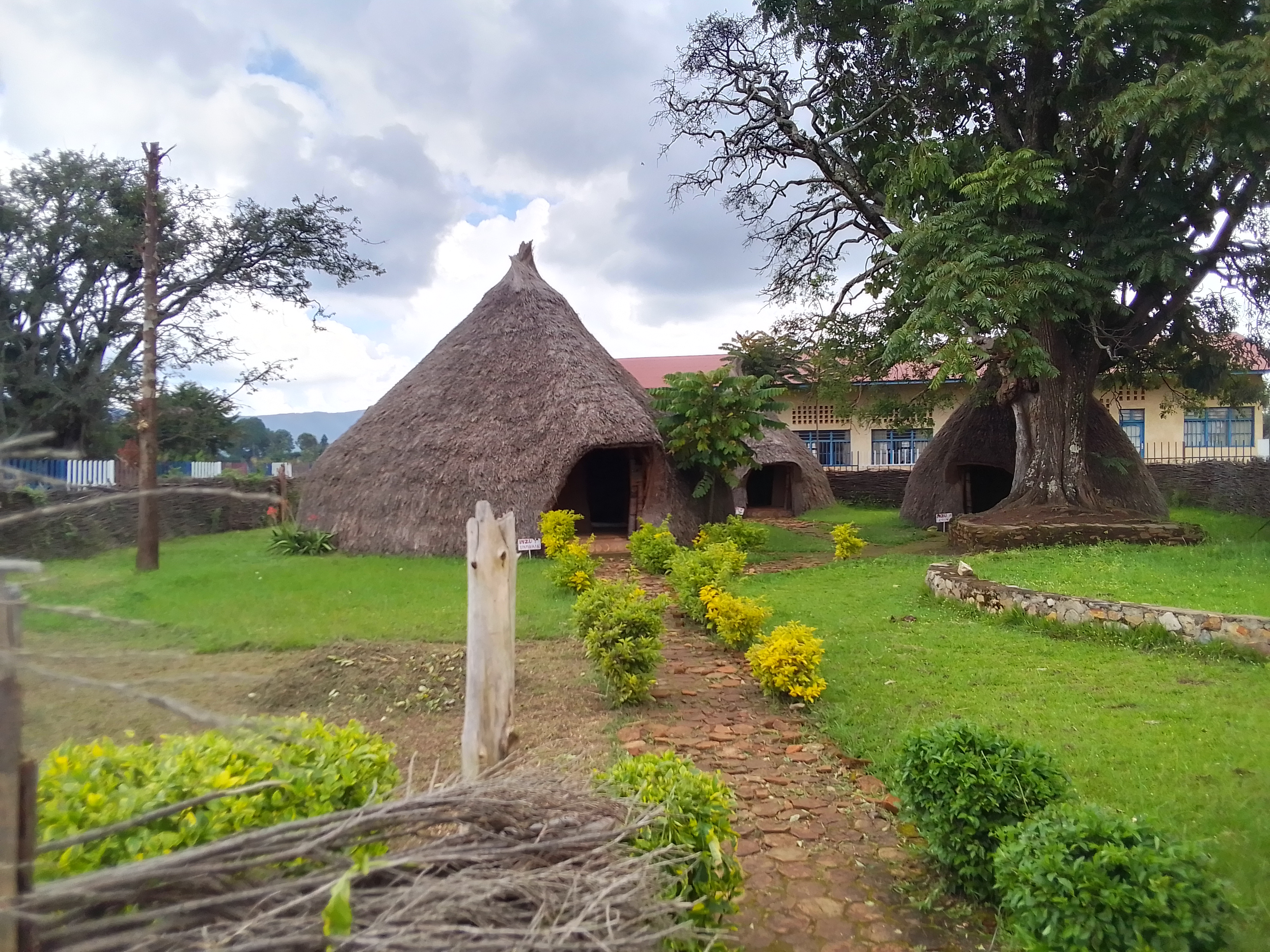
The traditional royal enclosure of Mwambutsa IV of Burundi, penultimate mwami

Burundian drummers, locally known as Abatimbo, are one of the major cultural attractions. Wooden drums are part of ancient Burundi culture. Their sound is known as "ancient" and "sacred" sound in Burundi and also a symbol of unity. In 2014, the ritual Burundian drum dance was placed on UNESCO's Intangible Cultural Heritage list. In 2017, President Pierre Nkurunziza limited drumming rituals to official events and banned women from drumming.

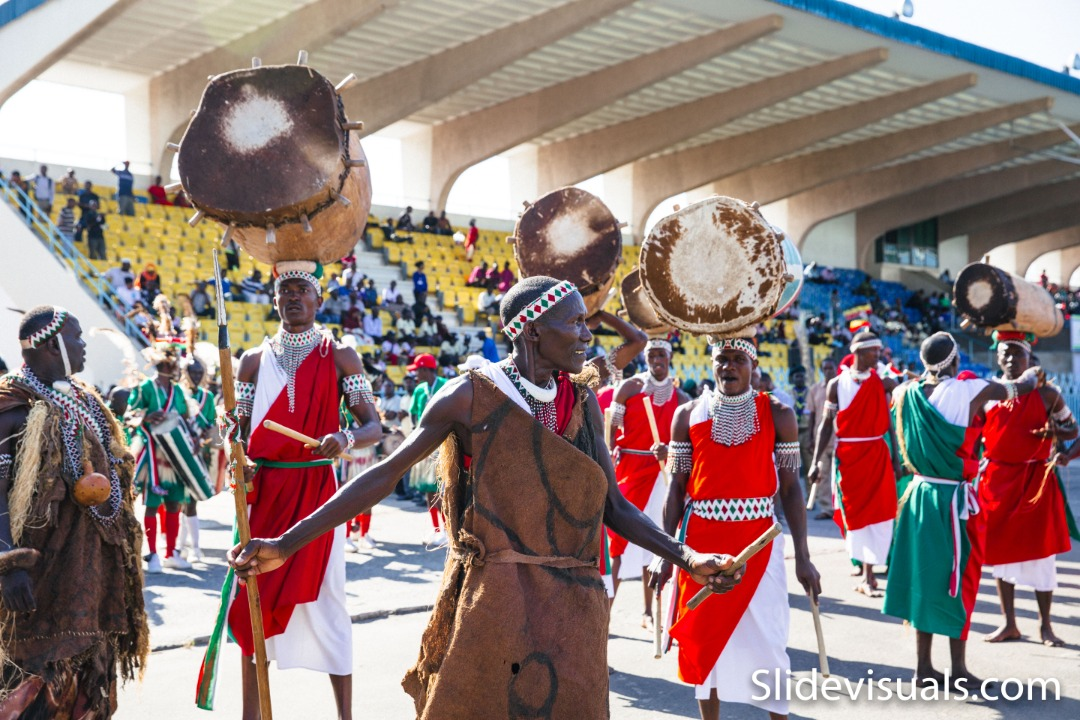
Burundian drummers wearing the traditional attire with drums

There is no UNESCO-recognized World Heritage Site in Burundi but there are 10 sites which are on UNESCO's tentative list. These 10 sites includes Gishora, Mugamba, Muramvya, Gasumo (the southernmost source of the Nile), Lake Rwihinda Natural Reserve, Lake Tanganyika, Rusizi National Park, Kibira National Park, Ruvubu National Park and the Karera waterfalls.

== Gallery ==
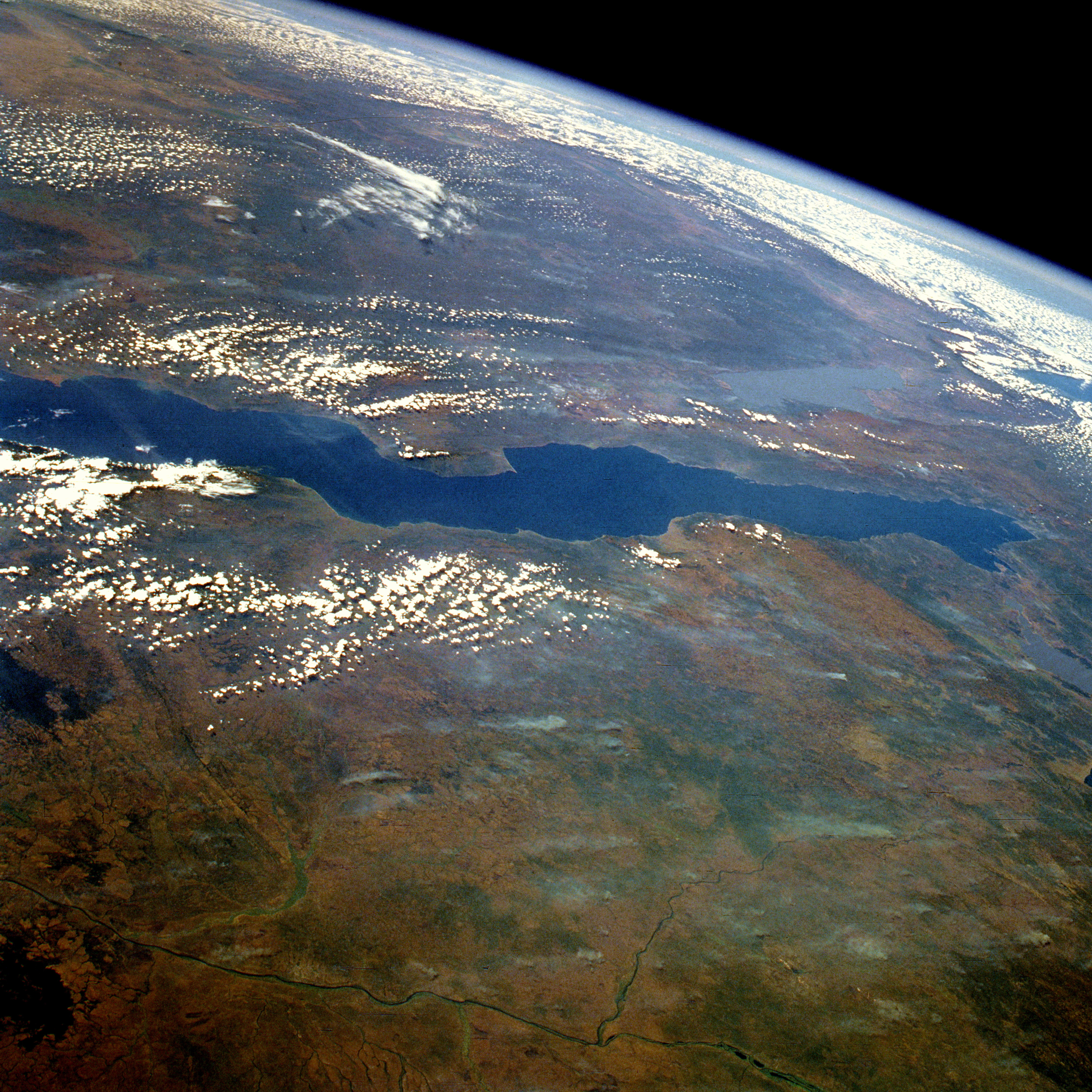
Lake Tanganyika from space in June 1985

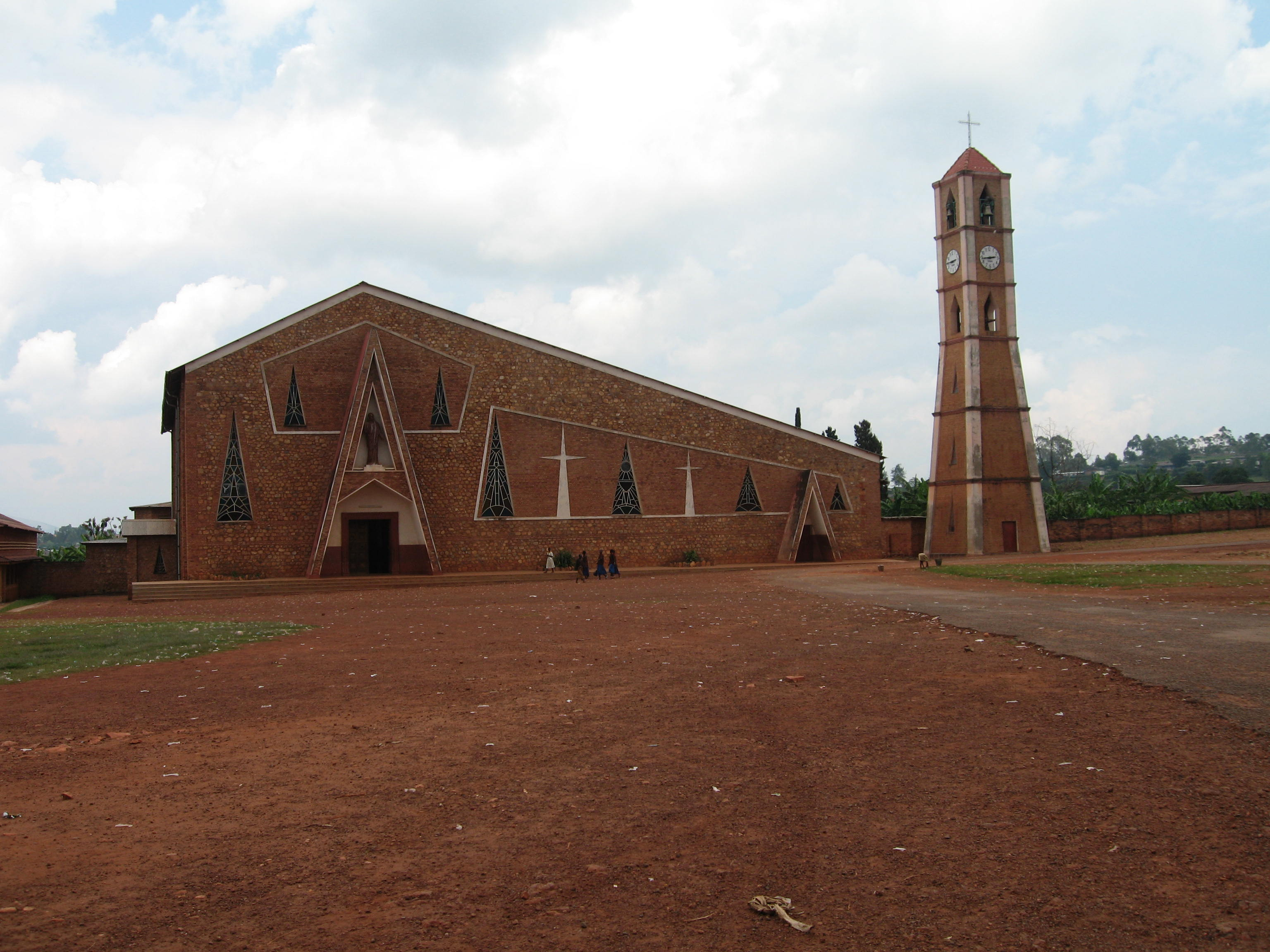
Gitega Church

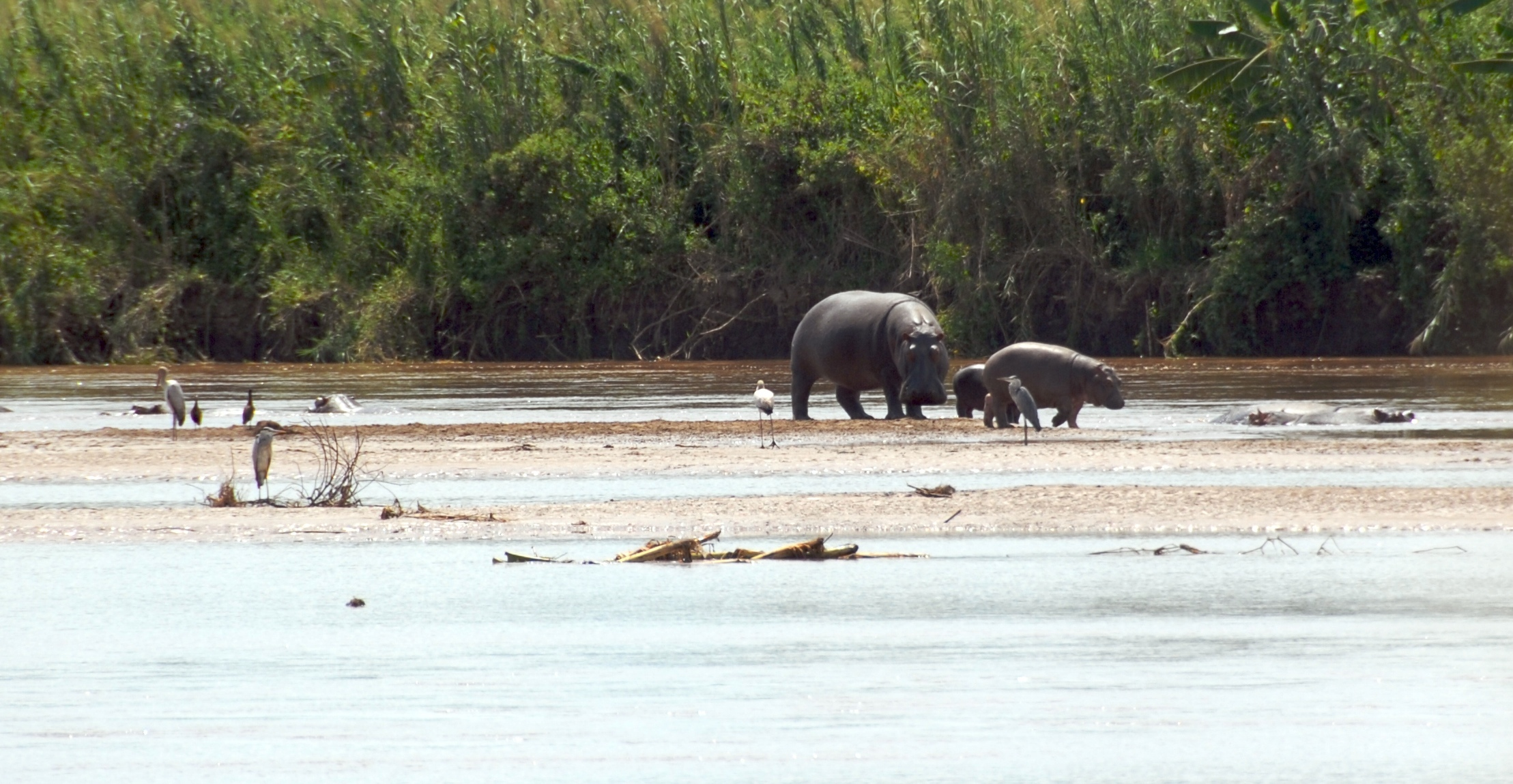
Hippopotamuses in Rusizi Nature Reserve

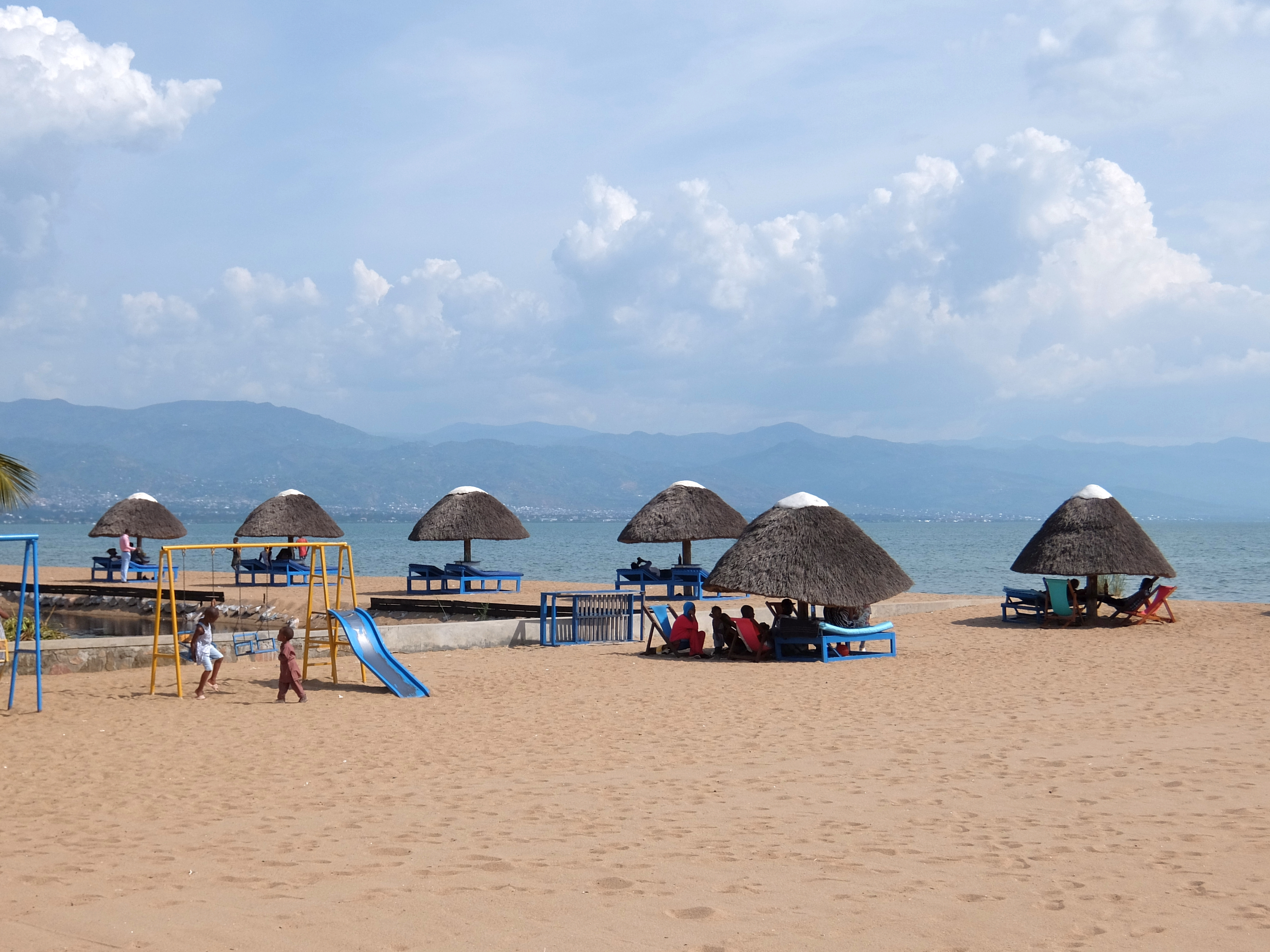
A beach in Bujumbura on the north side of Lake Tanganyika

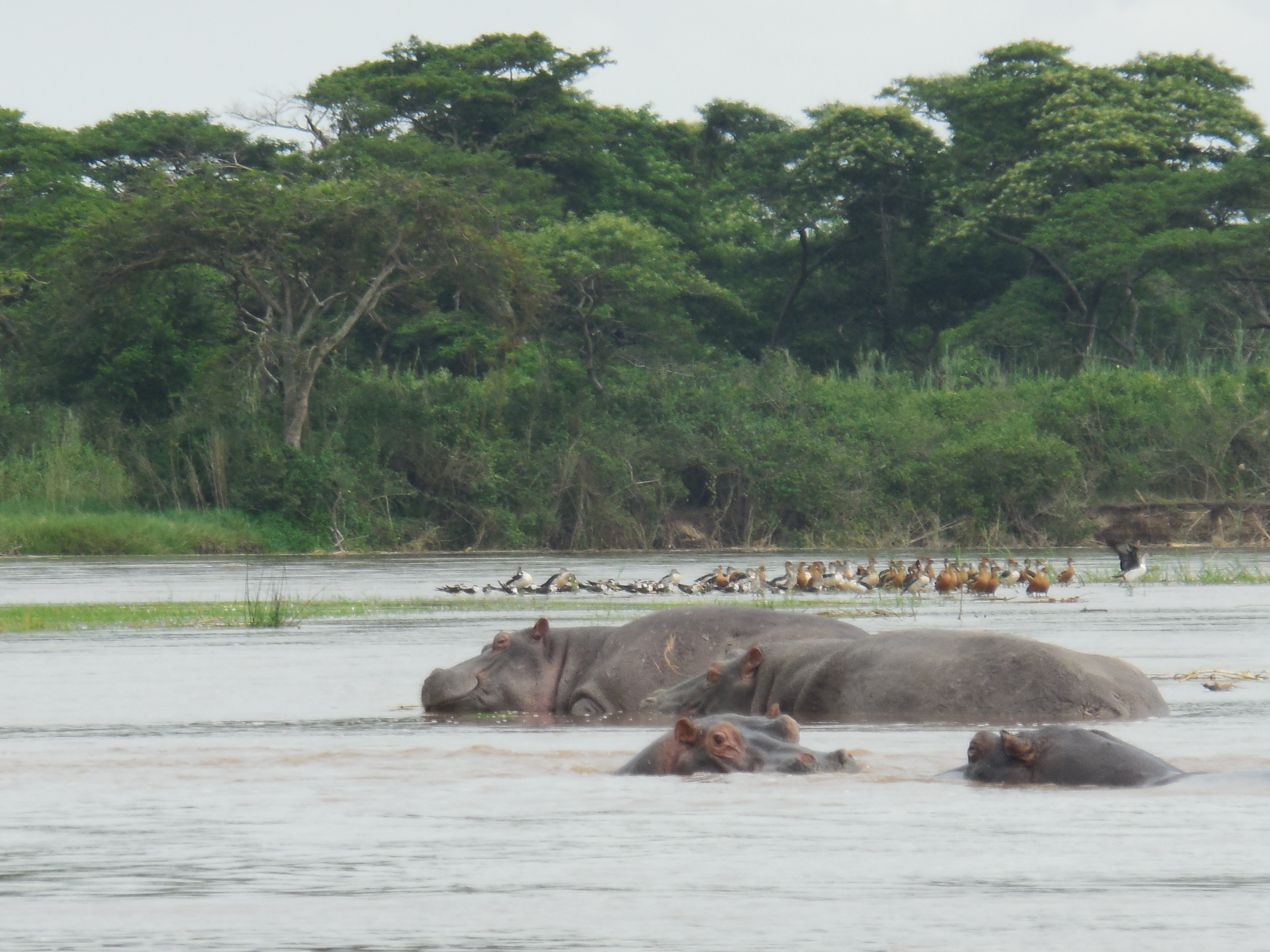
Wild hippopotamuses at Kibira National Park

== See also ==
- Visa policy of Burundi
