= Albertine Rift montane forests =

Ecoregion in east-central Africa

Albertine Rift montane forests Forêts montagnardes du Rift Albertin
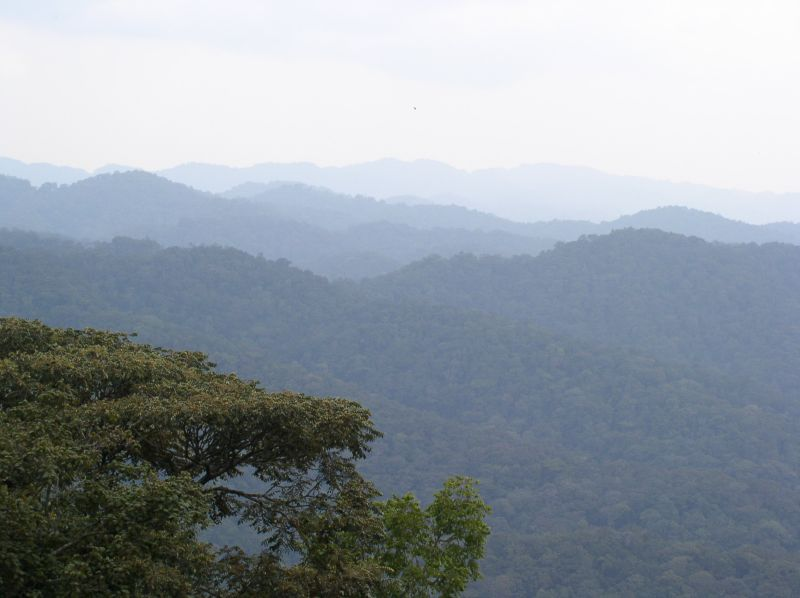
- Bwindi Impenetrable Forest in Uganda

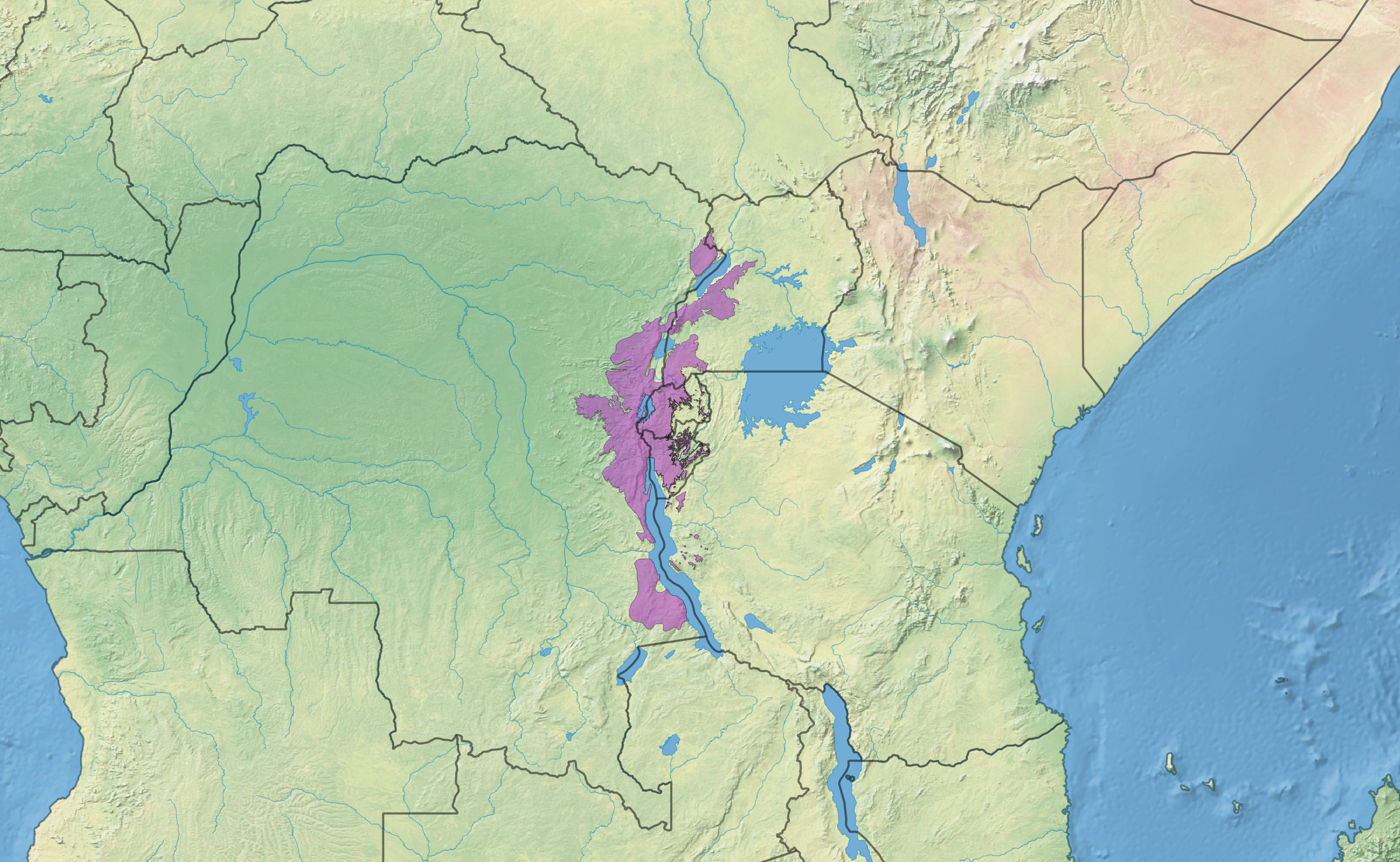
- Map of the Albertine Rift Montane Forests

Ecology
- Biome: Tropical and subtropical moist broadleaf forests
- Borders: List: Northern Congolian forest–savanna mosaic; East Sudanian savanna; Victoria Basin forest–savanna mosaic; Central Zambezian miombo woodlands; Southern Congolian forest–savanna mosaic; Northeast Congolian lowland forests; Rwenzori–Virunga montane moorlands
- Bird species: 732
- Mammal species: 228

Geography
- Area: 103,900 km^{2} (40,100 mi^{2})
- Countries: List: Burundi; Democratic Republic of the Congo; Rwanda; Tanzania; Uganda
- Coordinates: 2.75°S 29.14°E

Conservation
- Habitat loss: 27.433%
- Protected: 12.48%

The Albertine Rift montane forests (French: Forêts montagnardes du Rift Albertin) is a tropical moist broadleaf forest ecoregion in east-central Africa. The ecoregion covers the mountains of the northern Albertine Rift, and is home to distinct Afromontane forests with high biodiversity.

== Geography ==
The high montane forests cover the western portions of Rwanda and Burundi, the eastern edge of the Democratic Republic of the Congo, and portions of western Uganda and Tanzania. This area occupies the parallel Albertine Rift Mountains that enclose the western branch of the East African Rift. The mountain ranges include the Lendu Plateau of Uganda (the forest is almost completely cleared from here), and the Virunga Mountains and Rwenzori Mountains of Rwanda, Uganda, and the Democratic Republic of the Congo.

At the highest elevations of the Rwenzori and Virunga ranges (above 3000 meters), the forests transition to the Afroalpine Rwenzori–Virunga montane moorlands ecoregion, including the high peaks of Mount Stanley and Mount Karisimbi. The highest peak in Burundi, Mount Heha however is in this ecoregion.

=== Urban areas and settlements ===
Developed and settled areas in the region include:

- Uganda — the market town of Fort Portal, base for watching chimpanzees in Kibale National Park, and hub for visiting the Ruwenzori mountains to the north.
- Rwanda — Ruhengeri (near the Volcanoes National Park, and the Lake Kivu towns of Gisenyi, Kibuye (for boats trips to Napoleon Island in the lake, and Cyangugu, base for watching primates in the Nyungwe Forest.
- Democratic Republic of the Congo — the Lake Kivu cities of Goma, opposite Gisenyi and the base for visiting Virunga National Park) and Bukavu, opposite Cyangugu and near the Kahuzi-Biéga National Park, which is home to mountain gorillas but endangered due to the conflict in the region (see Second Congo War).
- Burundi — the northwestern towns of Cibitoke and flood-ravaged Bubanza, and the southern city of Bururi where Bururi Forest Nature Reserve preserves some of the Afromontane forest.

== Flora and fauna ==
The mountain rainforests of the ecoregion have a cooler climate than the Congolian lowland forests or the savanna of Uganda, Rwanda and Burundi, and therefore are home to a rich variety of Afromontane flora and especially fauna. The Albertine Rift montane forests are included on the Global 200 conservation list.

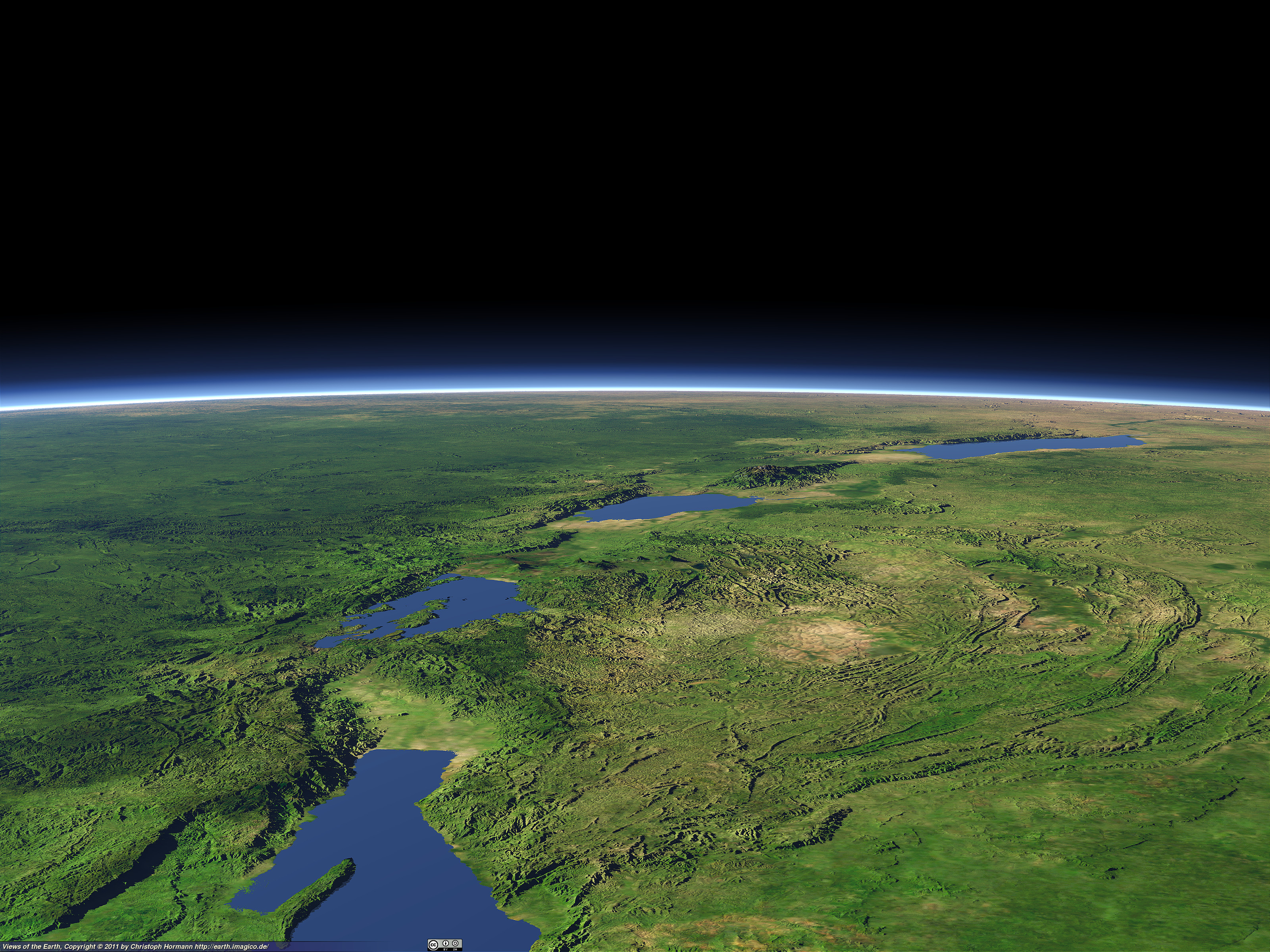
Topographic relief of the Albertine Rift, looking north from Lake Tanganyika

The rare mountain gorilla (Gorilla beringei beringei) survives only in this ecoregion as do the L'Hoest's monkey, and a subspecies of the Hamlyn's monkey − as well as many endemic species of butterflies and birds including: Grauer's warblers, Chapin's flycatchers, and the Rwenzori turaco. The Lendu Plateau clawed frog is endemic to that landform in the ecoregion.

== Conservation ==
Much of the forest has already been cleared for agriculture or for logging, especially in densely populated Rwanda and Burundi, but large areas of forest still remains in forest reserves and at higher altitudes in the Virunga, Itombwe, and Rwenzori Ranges. The forest clearance is ongoing and is a major threat to the ecology of the region, and to the forests as an important carbon store.

The violent political and rebel history of the region in recent times has also caused damage to the ecological balance, for example almost eliminating the population of African bush elephants from Virunga National Park in the DRC.

=== Protected areas ===
11.93% of the ecoregion is in protected areas. Protected areas include:

- Bururi Forest Nature Reserve, Burundi
- Bwindi Impenetrable National Park, Uganda
- Gishwati-Mukura National Park, Rwanda
- Kahuzi-Biéga National Park, Democratic Republic of the Congo
- Kazinga Wildlife Sanctuary, Uganda
- Kibale National Park, Uganda
- Kibira National Park, Burundi
- Kisimba Ikobo Primate Nature Reserve, Democratic Republic of the Congo
- Kyambura Wildlife Reserve, Uganda
- Mahale Mountains National Park, Tanzania
- Mgahinga Gorilla National Park, Uganda
- Monge Forest Nature Reserve, Burundi
- Nyungwe National Park, Rwanda
- Rusizi National Park, Burundi
- Rwenzori Mountains National Park, Uganda
- Queen Elizabeth National Park, Uganda
- Semuliki National Park, Uganda
- Tayna Nature Reserve, Democratic Republic of the Congo
- Toro-Semliki Wildlife Reserve, Uganda
- Virunga National Park, Democratic Republic of the Congo
- Volcanoes National Park, Rwanda

== Recreation ==
Visitor activities in the ecoregion's habitats include:

- Mountain gorilla watching in the 434 square kilometres (168 mi^{2}) Virunga Conservation Area (VCA) of the Virunga Mountains, which includes:

- Bwindi Impenetrable National Park in Uganda.
- Virunga National Park in the Democratic Republic of the Congo.
- Volcanoes National Park in Rwanda — former base of zoologist Dian Fossey.

- Kibale National Park in Uganda.
- Trekking in the Rwenzori Mountains, and within Ruwenzori Mountains National Park.
