= Rusizi =

Rusizi may refer to:

- Rusizi River, a river which flows between Lakes Kivu and Tanganyika, in Rwanda, Burundi and the DRC
- Rusizi National Park, a park based on the river Rusizi near Bujumbura, Burundi
- Rusizi (district), a district in Western Province, Rwanda
- Cyangugu, capital of Rusizi district, also sometimes known as Rusizi
