= Cardioglossa cyaneospila =

Conservation status
- Near Threatened (IUCN 3.1)

Scientific classification
- Kingdom: Animalia
- Phylum: Chordata
- Class: Amphibia
- Order: Anura
- Family: Arthroleptidae
- Genus: Cardioglossa
- Species: C. cyaneospila

Binomial name
- Cardioglossa cyaneospila Laurent, 1950

Synonyms
- Cardioglossa nigromaculata cyaneospila Laurent, 1950

Species of amphibian

Cardioglossa cyaneospila is a species of frog in the family Arthroleptidae. It is endemic to the Albertine Rift area in eastern Democratic Republic of the Congo, southwestern Uganda, Rwanda, and southwestern Burundi. It was described in 1950 by Raymond Laurent based on specimens collected in 1949. No new records were published until 2011. Recent research has uncovered both old unpublished records and several new records, and the conservation status was changed from "data deficient" to "near threatened" in 2016. Common names Bururi long-fingered frog and Mukuzira long-fingered frog have been coined for this species.

== Description ==
Two males from Bururi measure about 31 mm (1.2 in) in snout–vent length. The species is named for its unusual blueish gray color. It has dark spots in its dorsum, a dark mask surrounding the eye and tympanum, and an infratympanic line typical for the genus Cardioglossa. Males have extremely long third fingers.

== Habitat and conservation ==
Cardioglossa cyaneospila occurs in montane forests at elevations of 1,470–2,300 m (4,820–7,550 ft) above sea level, with one imprecise record from about 1,100–1,300 m (3,600–4,300 ft). Specimens have been found active along trails during the day as well as active on the ground just before dusk, calling among low-lying vegetation some 1 metre above a stream.

Montane forests in the range of this species are generally highly threatened by agricultural encroachment and logging. However, it occurs in several protected areas, including Bwindi Impenetrable National Park in Uganda, Kahuzi-Biéga National Park in the Democratic Republic of the Congo, Bururi Nature Reserve in Burundi, and Gishwati Forest in Rwanda. It is also likely to occur in the Virunga National Park, Democratic Republic of the Congo.
