= Rumonge Nature Reserve =

Protected area in Burundi

- Réserve Naturelle Forestière de Rumonge
- IUCN category Ib (wilderness area)
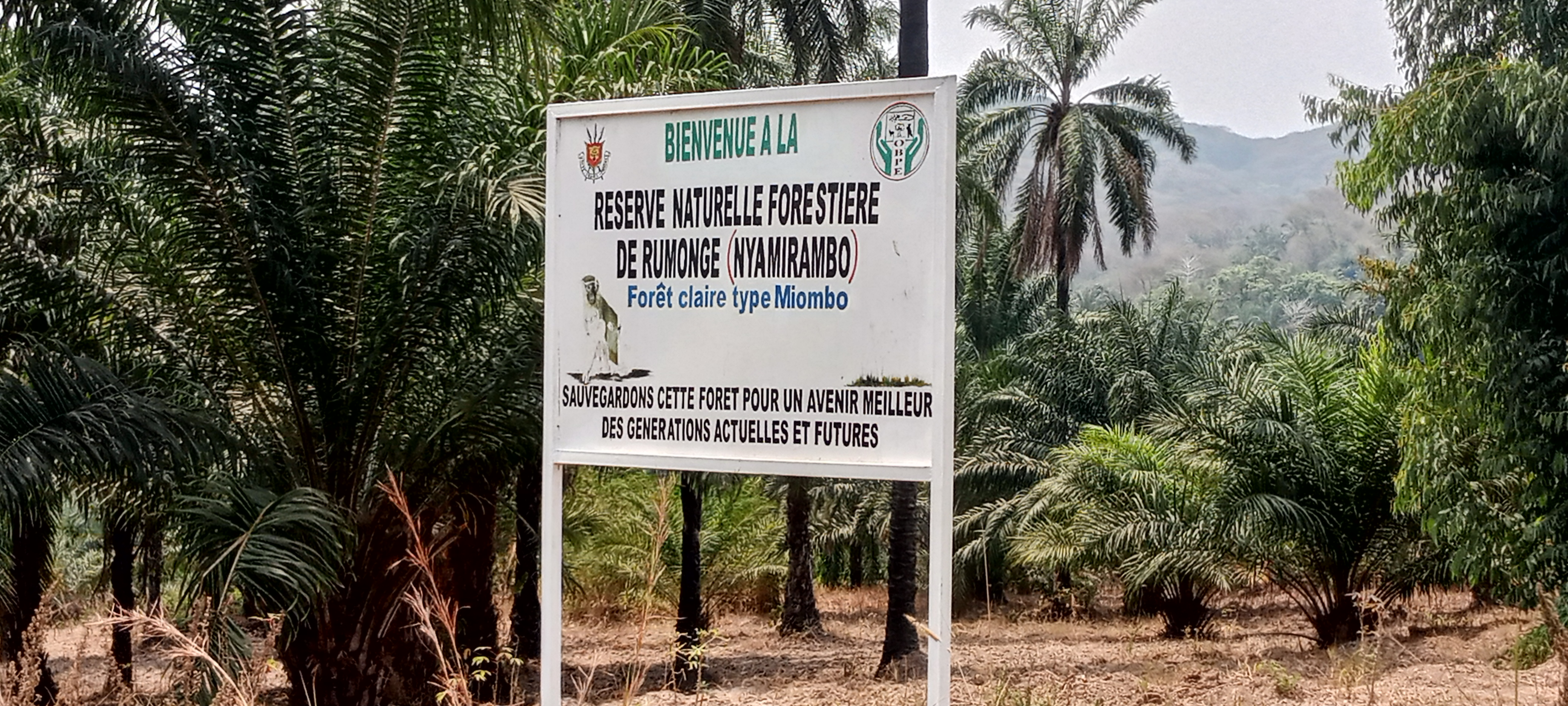

- Location within Burundi
- Coordinates: 4.013°S 29.493°E
- Area: 50 km^{2} (19 sq mi)
- Established: 1980
- Governing body: Office Burundais pour la Protection de l'Environnement

Rumonge Nature Reserve is a protected area in Burundi covering 50 km^{2} (19 sq mi). It was established in 1980. It is located at an elevation of 1,641 m (5,384 ft).
