= Karera waterfalls =

Series of waterfalls in Burundi

Karera Falls
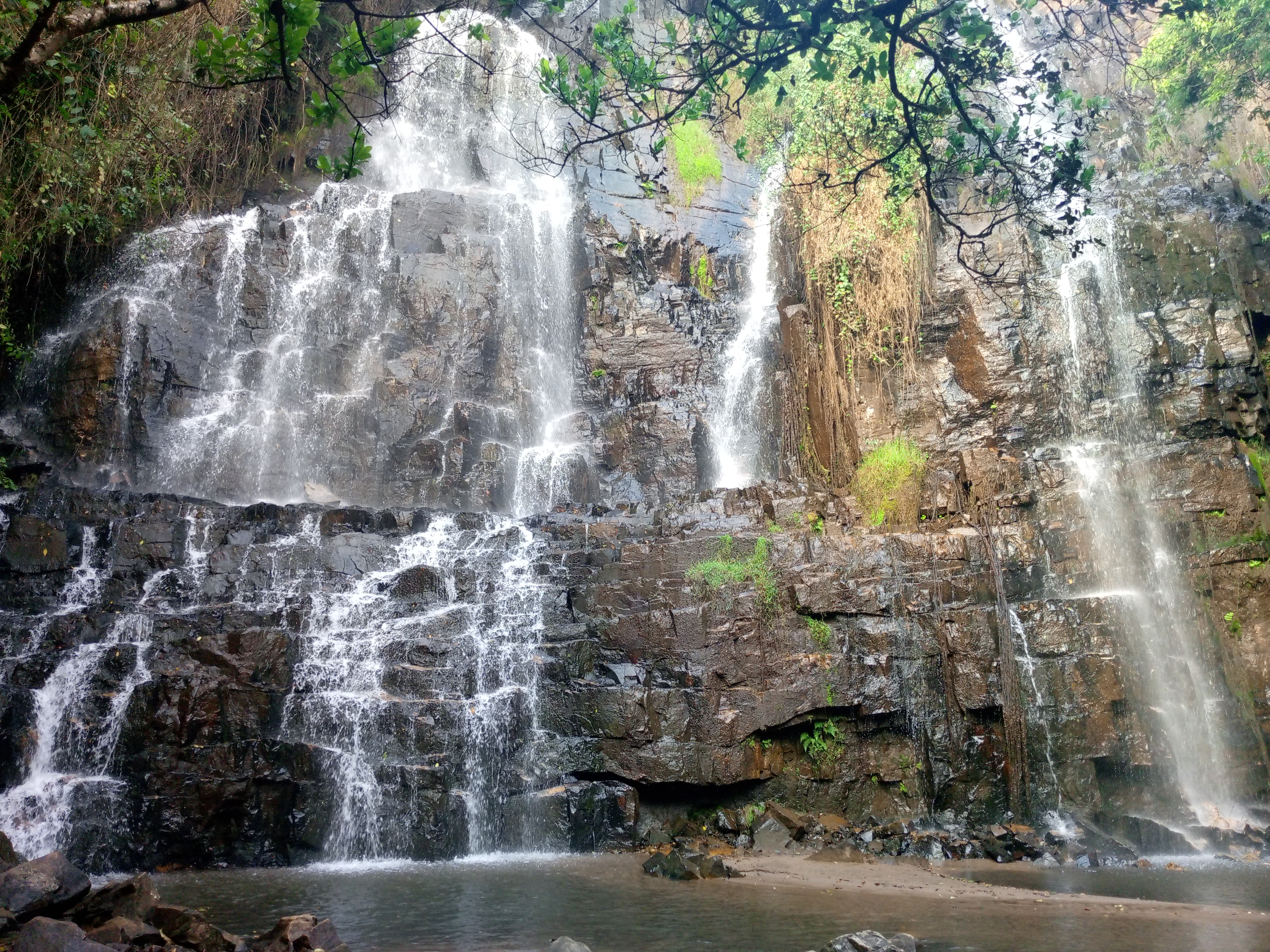

- Location within Burundi
- Location: Burundi
- Coordinates: 3.830°S 30.080°E
- Number of drops: 6

The Chutes de la Karera (Karera Falls or Chutes de la Karera) are a spectacular series of waterfalls in southeastern Burundi. They are located to the south of Rutana. The falls occupy over 142 hectares (350 acres), being made up of six branches divided on three landings.

== Description ==
On a first level, is a main fall subdivided into two parallel branches of a length estimated at 80 m (260 ft) about which pours on a basin. This fall consists of several waterfalls of different sizes intersected with two platforms. Another smaller waterfall is located roughly 50 m (160 ft) to the west of this main fall. Waters of these two falls converge on a second landing to form the third waterfall which pours on the valley.

== World Heritage Status ==
The site, along with the Nyakazu Fault, was added to the UNESCO World Heritage Tentative List on May 9, 2007 in the Mixed (Cultural & Natural) category.

== See also ==
- List of waterfalls
