= Ruvubu National Park =

National park in Burundi

- IUCN category II (national park)
- Location within Burundi
- Location: Burundi
- Nearest city: Muyinga
- Coordinates: 3°06′40″S 30°22′23″E
- Area: 508 km^{2} (196 mi^{2})
- Established: 1980
- Governing body: Office Burundais pour la Protection de l'Environnement

Ramsar Wetland
- Official name: Parc National de la Ruvubu
- Designated: 14 March 2013
- Reference no.: 2148

Ruvubu National Park is a national park in Burundi covering 508 km^{2} (196 mi^{2}) that was established in 1980. Its borders fall within the provinces of Karuzi, Muyinga, Cankuzo and Ruyigi. The park touches neighboring Tanzania to the south, the valley of the Ruvubu River whose landscape dominates this area.

The Ruvubu National Park gets its name from the Ruvubu River which runs through the length of the park. The park is the last vestige of the natural grassland ecosystem which once covered the vast majority of the northeast part of Burundi. It is home to a number of wildlife species, most notably hippopotamus, Nile crocodile, Cape buffalo, waterbuck, numerous duiker species, five primate species, including olive baboon, vervet monkey, red colobus monkey, blue monkey, and Senegal bushbaby. Approximately 200 species of birds were recorded in the park.
