= Kibira National Park =

National park in northwestern Burundi

- IUCN category II (national park)
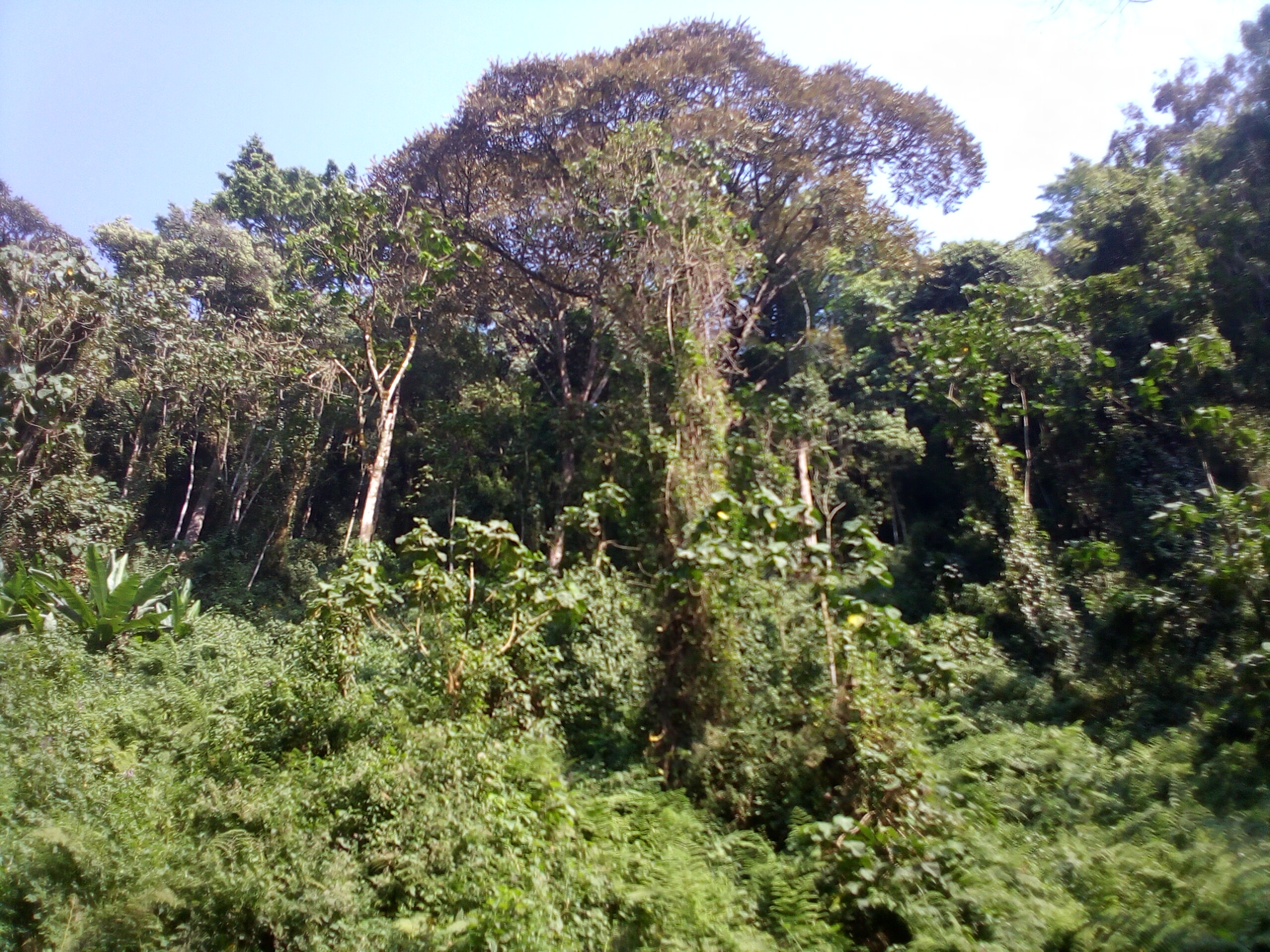

- Location within Burundi
- Location: Burundi
- Nearest city: Bujumbura
- Coordinates: 2°54′52.79″S 29°26′1″E
- Area: 400 km^{2} (150 sq mi)
- Governing body: INECN

The Kibira National Park (French: Parc national de Kibira) is a national park in northwestern Burundi. Overlapping four provinces and covering 400 km^{2} (150 sq mi), Kibira National Park lies atop the mountains of the Congo-Nile Divide. It extends north from the provincial town of Muramvya to the border of Rwanda where it is contiguous with the Nyungwe National Park.

== Forest ==
It is estimated that around 16% of the park consists of primary montane rainforest (the only montane forest in all of Burundi) and is adjacent to two large tea plantations, one in Teza and the other in Rwegura. The Park exceeds 1,100 m in elevation.

Dominant tree species include Symphonia globulifera, Newtonia buchananii, Albizia gummifera and Entandrophragma excelsum.

The forest contains areas of montane bog and bamboo stands. A total of 644 plants grown in the park. There are 98 species of mammal in the forest and 200 species of birds have been recorded here. Although the Kibira has not been as thoroughly studied as some of its neighboring protected areas, it still is considered 'the most important site in Burundi for the conservation of montane-forest birds'.

== Birds ==
Some of the important birds found here include the great blue turaco, mountain buzzard (Buteo oreophilus), white-spotted flufftail (Sarothrura pulchra), grey parrot (Psittacus erithacus), bar-tailed trogon (Apaloderma vittatum) and the black-and-white-casqued hornbill (Bycanistes subcylindricus).

The Kibira is home to a number of primate species, including chimpanzees and black and white colobus monkeys. The park is managed by the Institut National pour l'Environnement et la Conservation de la Nature (INECN).

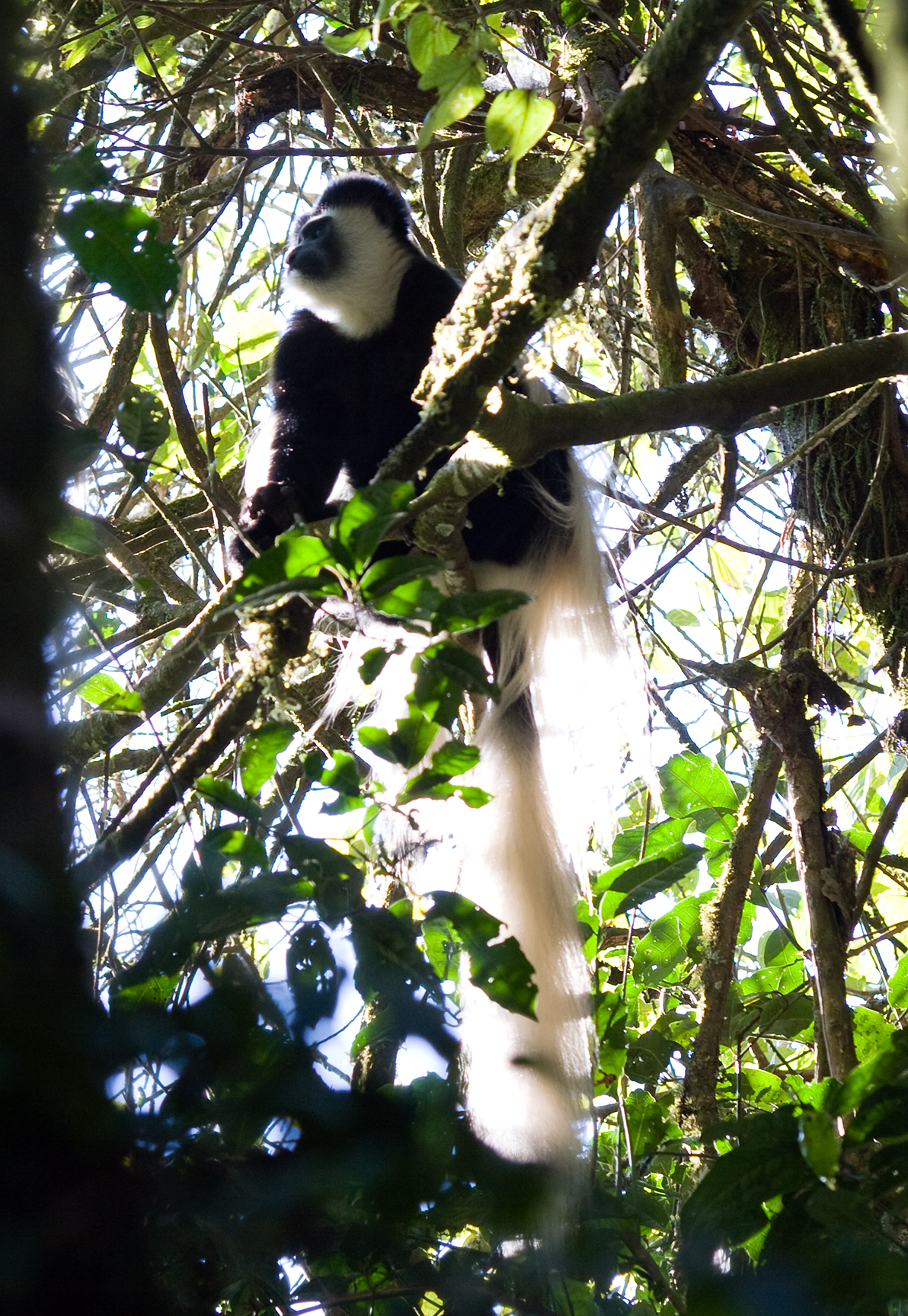
A black-and-white colobus monkey

== History ==
Until 1933, this forest was a hunting reserve of the kings of Burundi. The local people respected the forest, investing it with a magical power. Rights of use for livestock grazing and the gathering of forest products were recognized.

The sacred character of the forest, even prior to the colonial era, helped to conserve it. Between 1933 and 1980 Kibira was classified as the Congo-Nile Ridge Forest Reserve, first under Belgian rule, then after Burundian Independence in July 1962. Only the extraction of high-value timber was regulated and controlled.

=== Independence ===
Between Independence and 1980, the right to allocate new land for cultivation within the defined boundary was abolished, although grazing rights were retained. Despite its status as a National Park, there is much pressure on parts of the forest as a result of felling of trees and cutting of bamboo, fire and poaching, and encroaching subsistence agriculture.

== Water ==
The water from the forests of the Kibira National Park account for over three-quarters of the water that goes into the country’s largest dam, which generates half of the hydroelectric energy generated in the country.

== Gallery ==
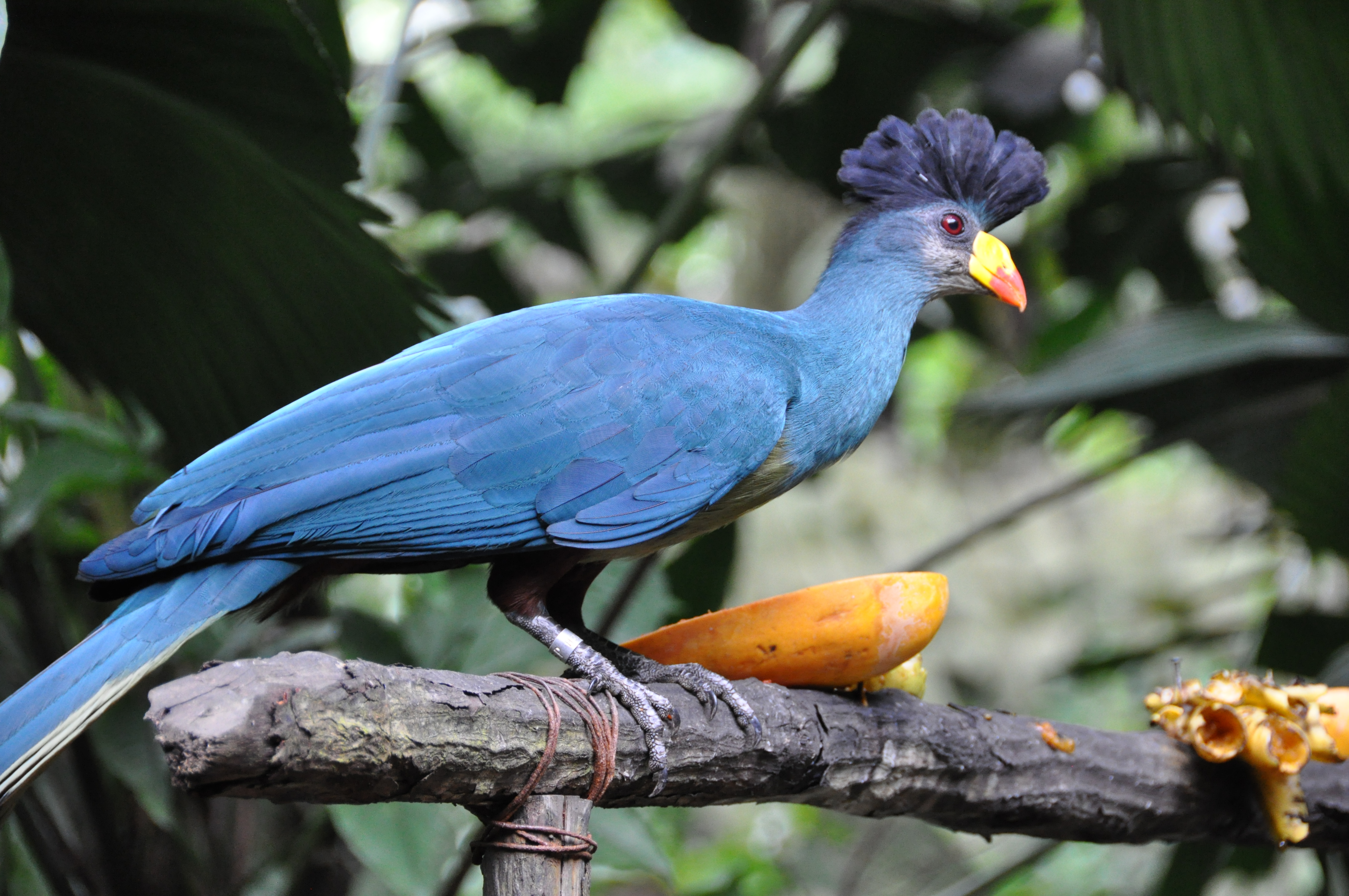
Great blue turaco

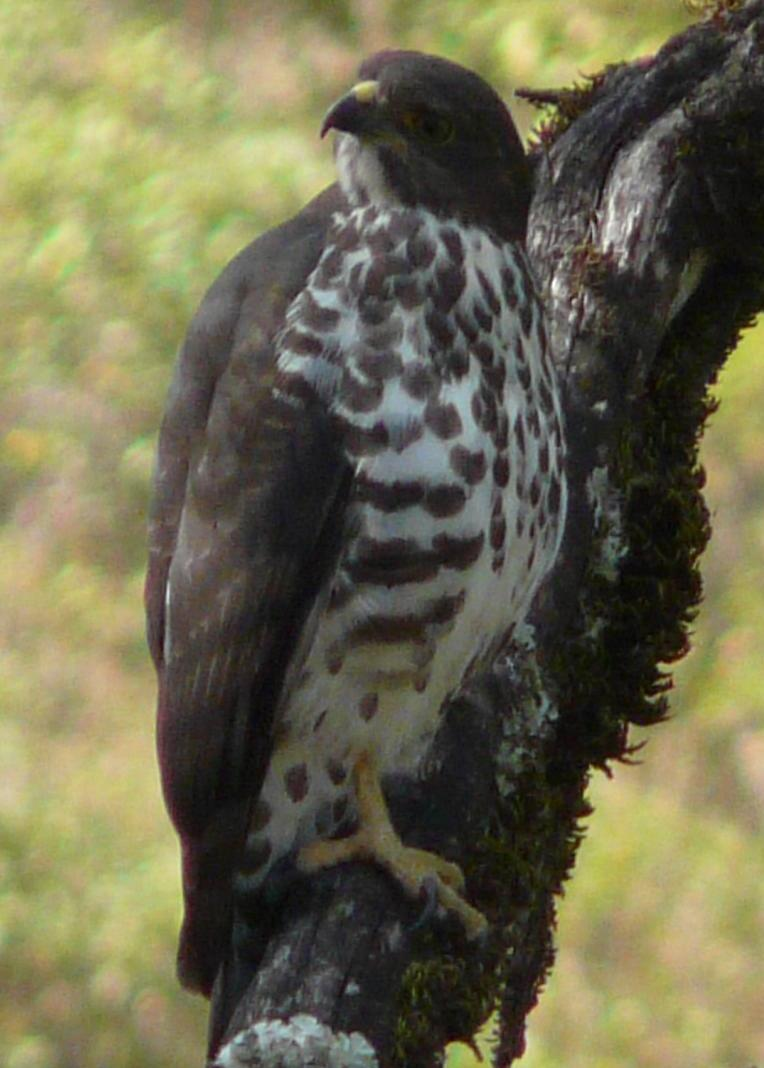
Mountain buzzard

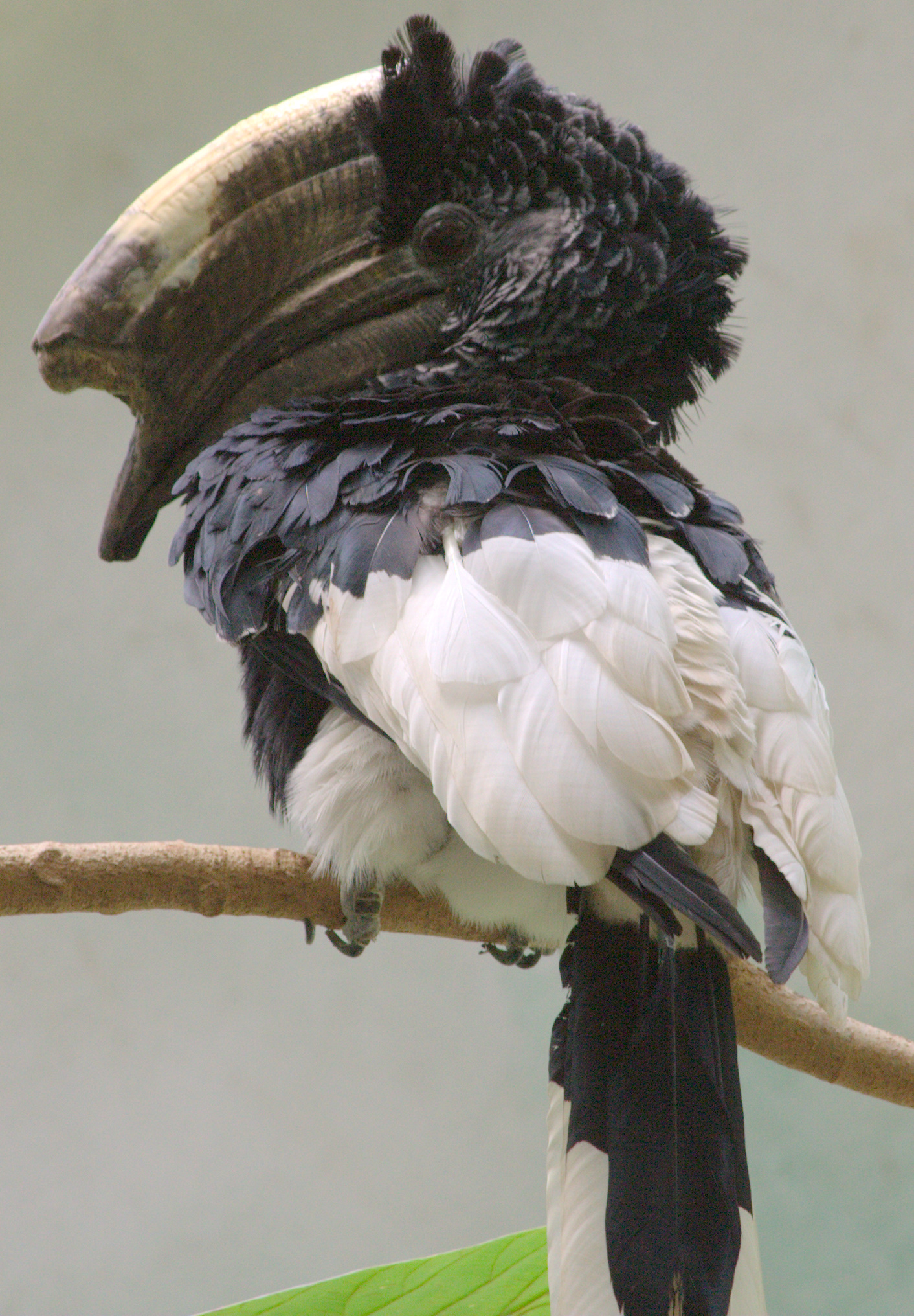
The black-and-white-casqued hornbill

== See also ==
- Great Lakes Twa
- Twa
