= Bururi Forest Nature Reserve =

Nature reserve in Burundi

- Bururi Nature Reserve
- IUCN category Ib (wilderness area)
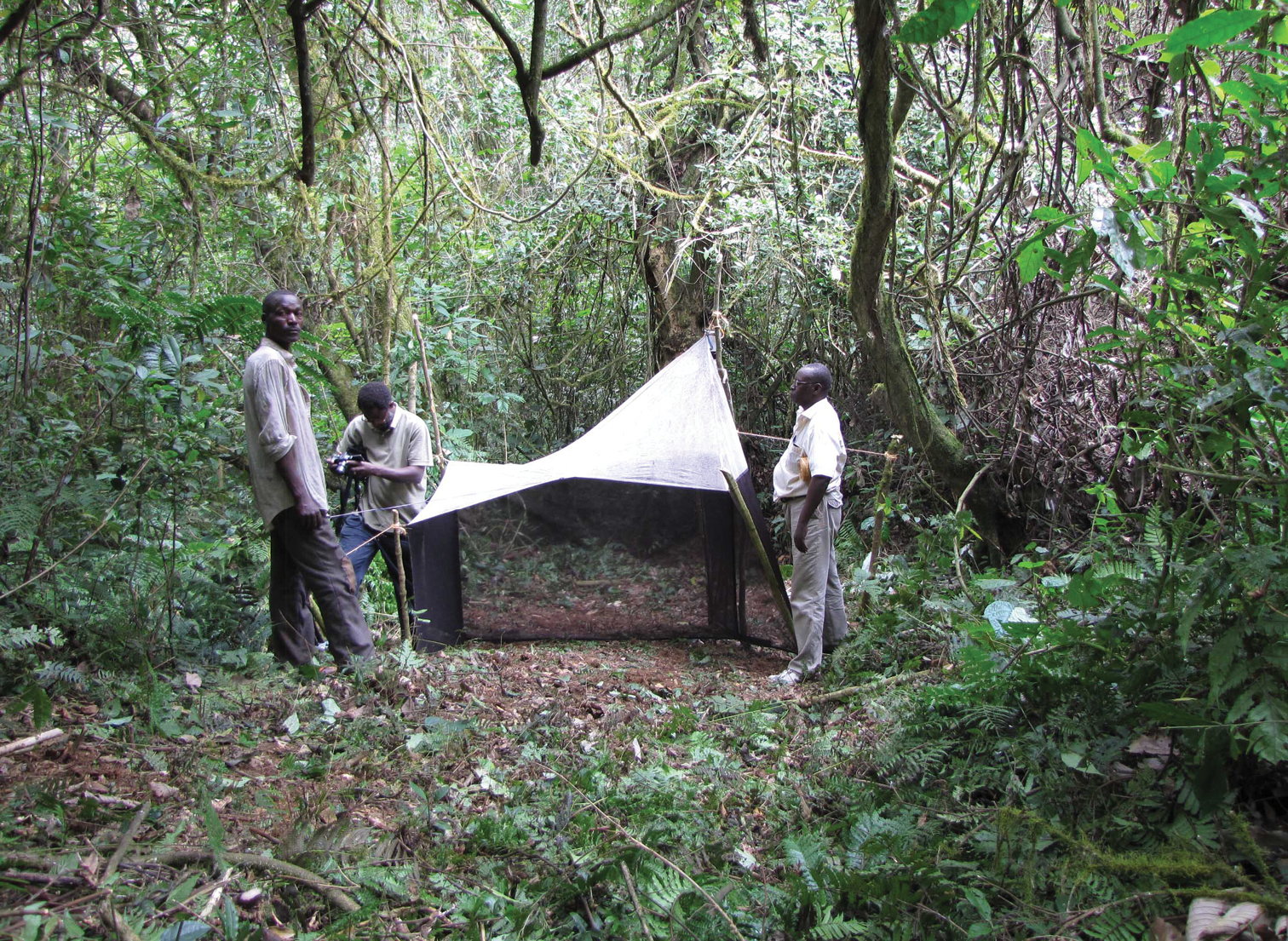

- Location within Burundi
- Coordinates: 3°56′20″S 29°35′50″E
- Area: 33 km^{2} (13 sq mi)
- Designation: Nature reserve
- Established: 1951
- Governing body: Office Burundais pour la Protection de l'Environnement (OBPE)

Bururi Forest Nature Reserve (French: Réserve Naturelle Forestière de Bururi) is a nature reserve in southwestern Burundi. Created in 1951, it is designated a wilderness area (IUCN protected area category Ib).

Its area is 33 km^{2}. It is managed by the Institute National pour l’ Environment et la Conservation de la nature (INECN).

The annual rainfall is from 1200mm to 2400mm.

There are 93 species of trees in the Bururi Forest, with Strombosia and Myrianthus spp. dominant and Tabernaemontana, Newtonia, and Entandrophragma spp. also common.

87 bird species have also been registered, including Apalis argentea which is common in some areas.

The Siguvyaye River flows through the southern end of the reserve. The waterfalls of the river and the beautiful surrounding landscapes are potential tourist attractions.
