= Rusizi National Park =

National park in Burundi

- Réserve naturelle du Rusizi
- IUCN category II (national park)
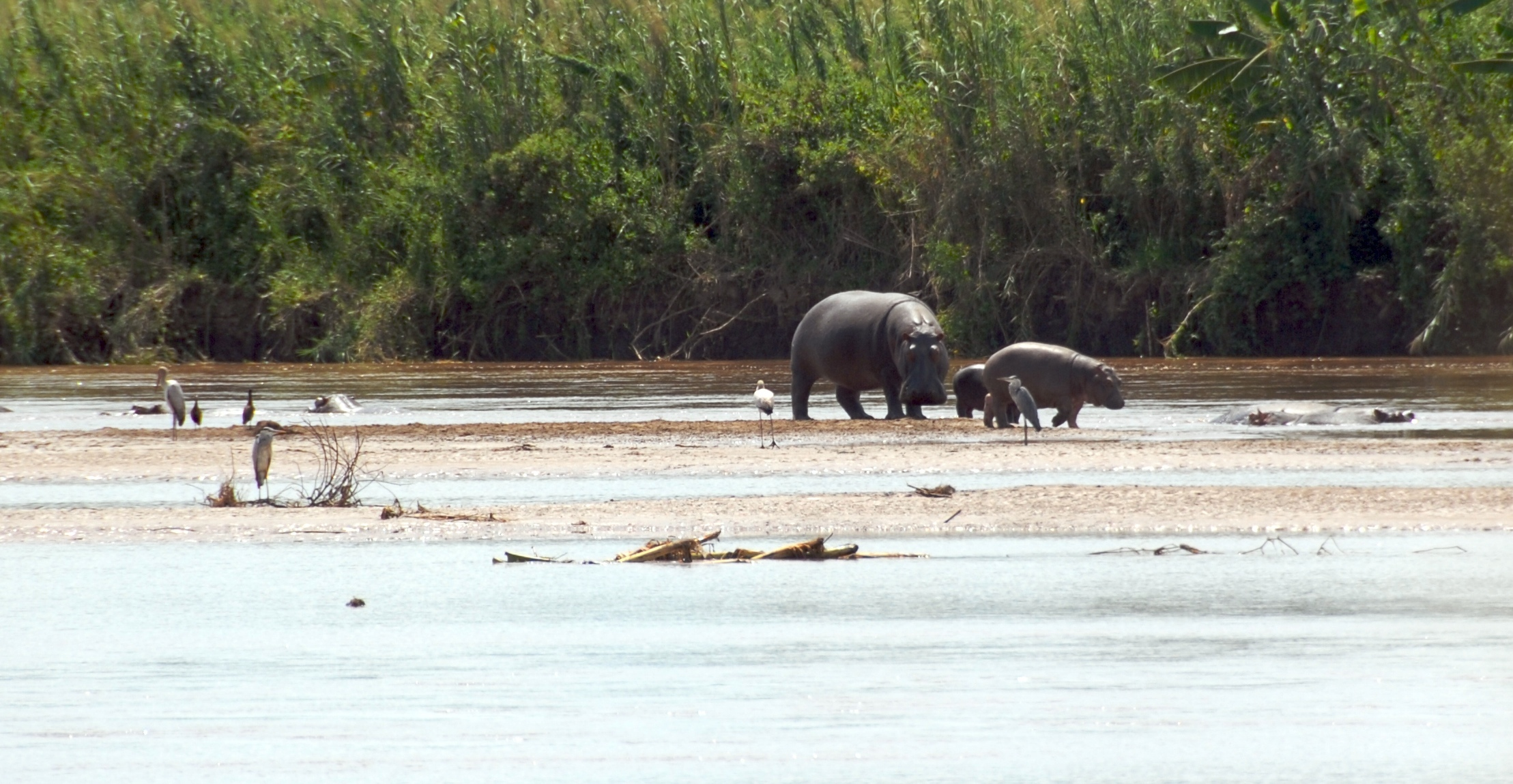
- Hippopotamuses in Rusizi National Park

- Location within Burundi
- Location: Burundi
- Nearest city: Bujumbura
- Coordinates: 3°14′52″S 29°13′50″E
- Area: 90 km^{2} (35 sq mi)
- Established: 1980
- Governing body: Office Burundais pour la Protection de l'Environnement

Ramsar Wetland
- Official name: Parc National de la Rusizi
- Designated: 5 June 2002
- Reference no.: 1180

Rusizi National Park is a national park in Burundi, next to the Rusizi River. It is 15 km north of the city of Bujumbura and home to hippopotamuses and sitatungas. Gustave, a Nile crocodile, is rumored to have killed 300 people here.
