= Kavumbagu =

Kavumbagu is a surname. Notable people with the surname include:

- Didier Kavumbagu (born 1988), Burundian footballer
- Jean-Claude Kavumbagu (fl. 2008–2011), Burundian journalist
