= Telephone numbers in Burundi =

- Location of Burundi (dark green)
- Country: Burundi
- Continent: Africa
- Regulator: ARCT
- NSN length: 8
- Format: +257 yy yy xxxx
- Country code: +257
- International access: 00

The following are the calling codes in Burundi.

== Calling formats ==
To call in Burundi, the following format is used:

yy yy xxxx Calls inside Burundi

+257 yy yy xxxx Calls from outside Burundi

The NSN length is eight digits.

== List of area codes in Burundi ==
LIST OF AREA CODES
Area Code	Area/City
22 20 XXXX	Bujumbura
22 21 XXXX	Bujumbura
22 22 XXXX	Bujumbura
22 23 XXXX	Bujumbura
22 24 XXXX	Bujumbura
22 25 XXXX	Bujumbura
22 26 XXXX	Western Zone
22 27 XXXX	Rural areas
22 30 XXXX	Northern Zone
22 40 XXXX	Central and Eastern Zone
22 50 XXXX	Southern Zone

== List of mobile codes in Burundi ==
LIST OF MOBILE CODES
Number Blocks	Operators	Services
61 XX XXXX	VIETTEL	GSM network
68 XX XXXX	VIETTEL	GSM network
69 XX XXXX	VIETTEL	GSM network
71 XX XXXX	UCOM	GSM network
72 XX XXXX	UCOM	GSM network
75 XX XXXX	LACELL	GSM network
76 XX XXXX	UCOM	GSM network
77 XX XXXX	ONATEL	MOBILE GSM network
79 XX XXXX	UCOM	GSM network
