= Burundi =

Country in East Africa

Republic of Burundi
(in other official languages)
French	République du Burundi
Kirundi	Repuburika y’Uburundi
- Flag Coat of arms
- Motto: "Ubumwe, Ibikorwa, Amajambere" (Kirundi); "Unité, Travail, Progrès" (French); "Union, Work, Progress" (English)
- Anthem: "Burundi bwacu" (Kirundi) "Our Burundi"
- Location of Burundi (dark blue) in Africa (light blue)
- Capital: Gitega (political); Bujumbura (economic); 3°25′41″S 29°55′41″E (Gitega); 3°21′46″S 29°21′56″E (Bujumbura)
- Largest city: Bujumbura
- Official languages: Kirundi; French; English
- Recognised national languages: Kirundi
- Ethnic groups: 100% Barundi; 85% Hutu; 14% Tutsi; 1% Twa; ~1% other (Note: Including ~3,000 Europeans and ~2,000 South Asians)
- Religion (2020): 93.4% Christianity; 63.7% Catholicism; 25.2% Protestantism; 4.5% other Christian; 4.3% traditional faiths; 2.1% Islam; 0.2% other / none
- Demonym: Burundian
- Government: Unitary dominant-party presidential republic under an authoritarian dictatorship
  - President: Évariste Ndayishimiye
  - Vice President: Prosper Bazombanza
  - Prime Minister: Nestor Ntahontuye
  - President of the Senate: Gervais Ndirakobuca
  - President of the National Assembly: Gélase Daniel Ndabirabe
  - Chief Justice: Gamaliel Nkurunziza
- Legislature: Parliament
  - Upper house: Senate
  - Lower house: National Assembly

Establishment history
  - Kingdom of Urundi: 1680–1966
  - Part of German East Africa: 1890–1916
  - Part of Ruanda-Urundi: 1916–1962
  - Independence from Belgium: 1 July 1962
  - Republic: 28 November 1966
  - Burundian Civil War: 21 October 1993 – 15 May 2005
  - Current constitution: 17 May 2018

Area
  - Total: 27,834 km^{2} (10,747 sq mi) (142nd)
  - Water (%): 10

Population
  - 2024 estimate: ▲14,151,540 (78th)
  - Density: 565/km^{2} (1,463.3/sq mi) (25th)
- GDP (PPP): 2025 estimate
  - Total: ▲$13.980 billion (161st)
  - Per capita: ▲US$1,020 (185th)
- GDP (nominal): 2025 estimate
  - Total: ▲US$6.750 billion (157th)
  - Per capita: ▲US$489 (186th)
- Gini (2020): ▼37.5 medium inequality
- HDI (2023): ▲0.439 low (187th)
- Currency: Burundian franc (FBu) (BIF)
- Time zone: UTC+2 (CAT)
- Calling code: +257
- ISO 3166 code: BI
- Internet TLD: .bi

Burundi, (Note: /bəˈrʊndi/ bə-RUUN-dee or /bəˈrʌndi/ bə-RUN-dee) officially the Republic of Burundi, (Note: Kirundi: Repuburika y'Uburundi [u.βu.ɾǔː.ndi]; Swahili: Jamuhuri ya Burundi [ɓuˈruⁿdi]; French: République du Burundi [buʁundi, byʁyndi]) is a landlocked country in East Africa. It is located in the Great Rift Valley at the junction between the African Great Lakes region and southeastern Africa, with a population of over 14 million people. It is bordered by Rwanda to the north, Tanzania to the east and southeast, and the Democratic Republic of the Congo to the west; Lake Tanganyika lies along its southwestern border. The political capital city is Gitega and the economic capital and largest city is Bujumbura.

The Twa, Hutu, and Tutsi peoples have lived in Burundi for at least 500 years. For more than 200 of those years, Burundi was an independent kingdom. In 1885, it became part of German East Africa. After the First World War and Germany's defeat, the League of Nations mandated the territories of Burundi and Rwanda to Belgium in a combined territory called Ruanda-Urundi. After the Second World War, this transformed into a United Nations trust territory.

Burundi gained independence in 1962 and initially retained the monarchy. However, a coup d'état in 1966 replaced the monarchy with a one-party republic, and for the next 27 years, Burundi was ruled by a series of ethnic Tutsi dictators and notably experienced a genocide of its Hutu population in 1972. In 1993, Melchior Ndadaye became Burundi's first Hutu president following the country's first multi-party presidential election. His assassination three months later during a coup attempt provoked the 12-year Burundian Civil War. In 2000, the Arusha Agreement was adopted, which was largely integrated in a new constitution in 2005. Since the 2005 post-war elections, the dominant party has been the Hutu-led National Council for the Defense of Democracy – Forces for the Defense of Democracy (CNDD–FDD), widely accused of authoritarian governance and perpetuating the country's poor human rights record.

Burundi remains primarily a rural society, with just 13.4% of the population living in urban areas in 2019. Burundi is densely populated, and many young people emigrate in search of opportunities elsewhere. Roughly 81% of the population are of Hutu origin, 18% are Tutsi, and fewer than 1% are Twa. The official languages are Kirundi, French, and English—Kirundi being officially recognised as the sole national language.

One of the smallest countries in Africa, Burundi's land is used mostly for subsistence agriculture and grazing. Deforestation, soil erosion, and habitat loss are major ecological concerns. As of 2005, the country was almost completely deforested. Less than 6% of its land was covered by trees, with over half of that being for commercial plantations. Burundi is the poorest country in the world by nominal GDP per capita and is one of the least developed countries. It faces widespread poverty, corruption, instability and authoritarianism. Burundi is a member of the African Union, Common Market for Eastern and Southern Africa, United Nations, East African Community, OIF and the Non-Aligned Movement.

== Etymology ==
Modern Burundi takes its name from the precolonial Kingdom of Burundi (Urundi), a polity that had emerged by the 16th century. The colonial capital Usumbura was officially renamed Bujumbura at independence in 1962.

== History ==
Burundi is one of the few countries in Africa (along Rwanda, Botswana, Lesotho, and Eswatini) to be a direct territorial continuation of a pre-colonial era African state. The early history of Burundi, and especially the role and nature of its three dominant ethnic groups—the Twa, Hutu and Tutsi—is debated amongst academics.

=== Kingdom of Burundi ===
The first evidence of the Burundian state dates back to the late 16th century where it emerged on the eastern foothills of the Rift Valley. Over the following centuries it expanded, annexing smaller neighbours. The Kingdom of Burundi or Urundi, in the Great Lakes region was a polity ruled by a traditional monarch with several princes beneath him; succession struggles were common. The king (mwami) headed a princely aristocracy (ganwa) which owned most of the land and required a tribute from predominantly Hutu farmers and Tutsi herders. The Kingdom of Burundi was characterised by a hierarchical political authority and tributary economic exchange.

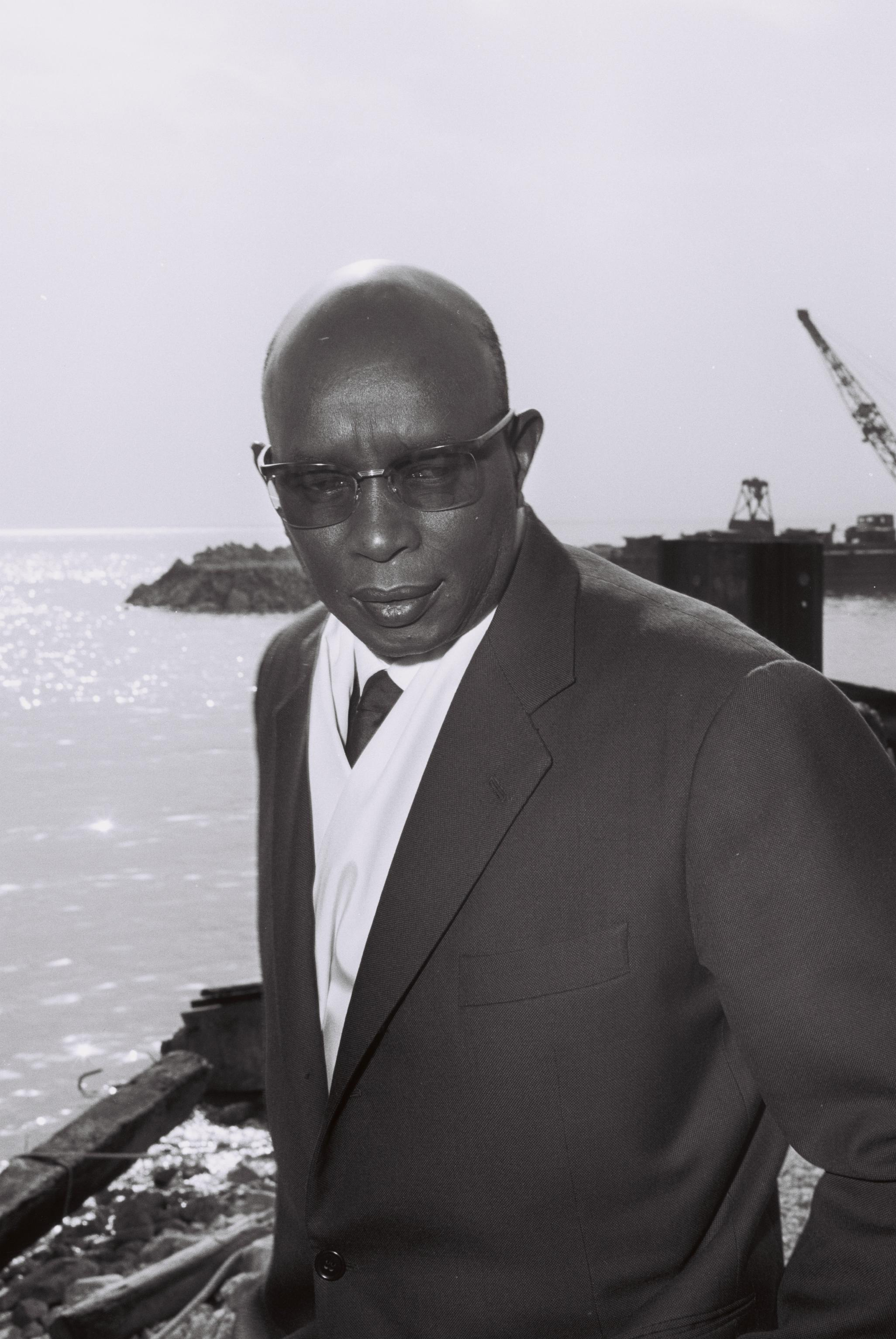
King Mwambutsa IV

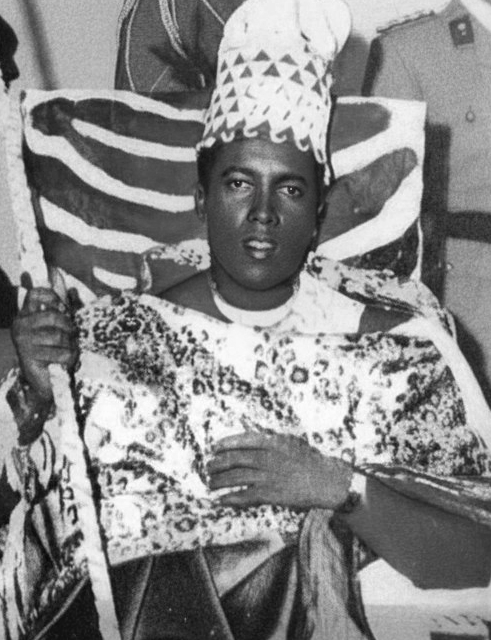
King Ntare V, last king of Burundi

In the mid-18th century, the Tutsi royalty consolidated authority over land, production, and distribution with the development of the ubugabire—a patron-client relationship in which the populace received royal protection in exchange for tribute and land tenure. By this time, the royal court was made up of the Tutsi-Banyaruguru. They had higher social status than other pastoralists such as the Tutsi-Hima. Lower levels of society consisted generally of Hutu people, with Twa at the bottom. The system had some fluidity, however. Some Hutu people belonged to the nobility and in this way also had a say in the functioning of the state.

The classification of Hutu or Tutsi was not merely based on ethnic criteria alone. Hutu farmers that managed to acquire wealth and livestock were regularly granted the higher social status of Tutsi, some even became close advisors of the ganwa. On the other hand, there are also reports of Tutsi that lost all their cattle and subsequently lost their higher status and were called Hutu. Thus, the distinction between Hutu and Tutsi was also a socio-cultural concept, instead of a purely ethnic one. There were many reports of marriages between Hutu and Tutsi people. In general, regional ties and power struggles played a far more determining role in Burundi's politics than ethnicity.

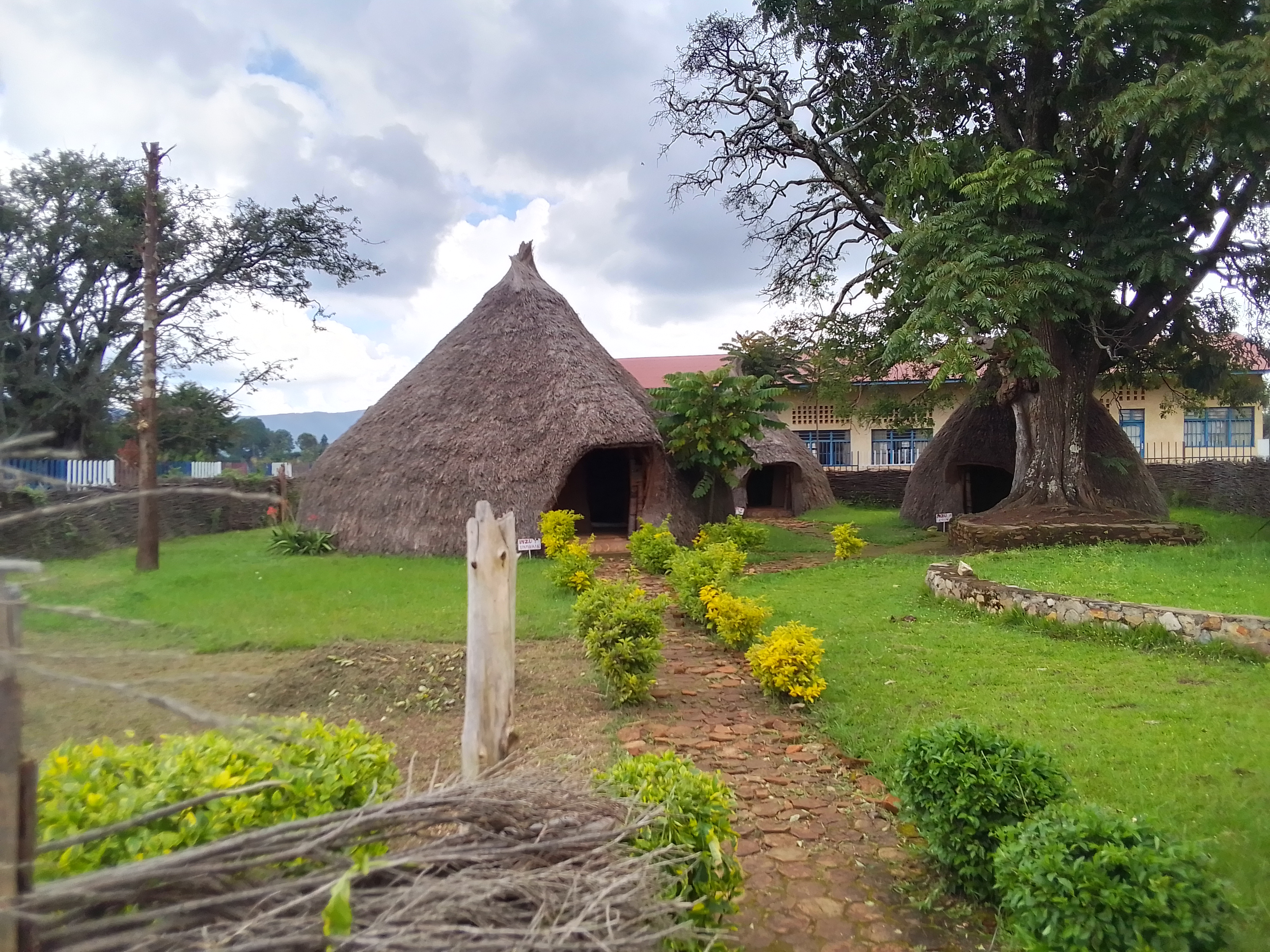
The traditional royal enclosure of Mwambutsa IV of Burundi, penultimate mwami

=== Colonial rule ===
From 1884, the German East Africa Company was active in the African Great Lakes region. As a result of heightened tensions and border disputes between the German East Africa Company, the British Empire and the Sultanate of Zanzibar, the German Empire was called upon to put down the Abushiri revolt and protect the empire's interests in the region. The German East Africa Company transferred its rights to the German Empire in 1891, in this way establishing the German colony of German East Africa, which included Burundi (Urundi), Rwanda (Ruanda), and the mainland part of Tanzania (formerly known as Tanganyika). The German Empire stationed armed forces in Rwanda and Burundi during the late 1880s. The location of present-day Gitega served as an administrative centre for the Ruanda-Urundi region.

During the First World War, the East African campaign greatly affected the African Great Lakes region. The Belgian and British colonial forces launched a coordinated attack on the German colony. The German army stationed in Burundi was forced to retreat by the numerical superiority of the Belgian army, and by 17 June 1916 Burundi and Rwanda were occupied. The Force Publique and the British Lake Force then started a thrust to capture Tabora, an administrative centre of German East Africa. After the war, as outlined in the Treaty of Versailles, Germany was forced to cede "control" of its western section to Belgium.

On 20 October 1924, Ruanda-Urundi, which consisted of modern-day Rwanda and Burundi, became a Belgian League of Nations mandate territory, with Usumbura as its capital. In practical terms it was considered part of the Belgian colonial empire. Burundi continued its kingship dynasty despite the presence of European authorities. The Belgians preserved many of the kingdom's institutions.

Following the Second World War, Ruanda-Urundi was classified as a United Nations trust territory under Belgian administrative authority. During the 1940s, a series of policies caused divisions throughout the country. On 4 October 1943, powers were split in the legislative division of Burundi's government between chiefdoms and lower chiefdoms. Chiefdoms were in charge of land, and lower sub-chiefdoms were established. Native authorities also had powers. In 1948, Belgium allowed the region to form political parties.

=== Independence ===
Flag of the Kingdom of Burundi (1962–1966)

Coat of arms of the Kingdom of Burundi (1962–1966)

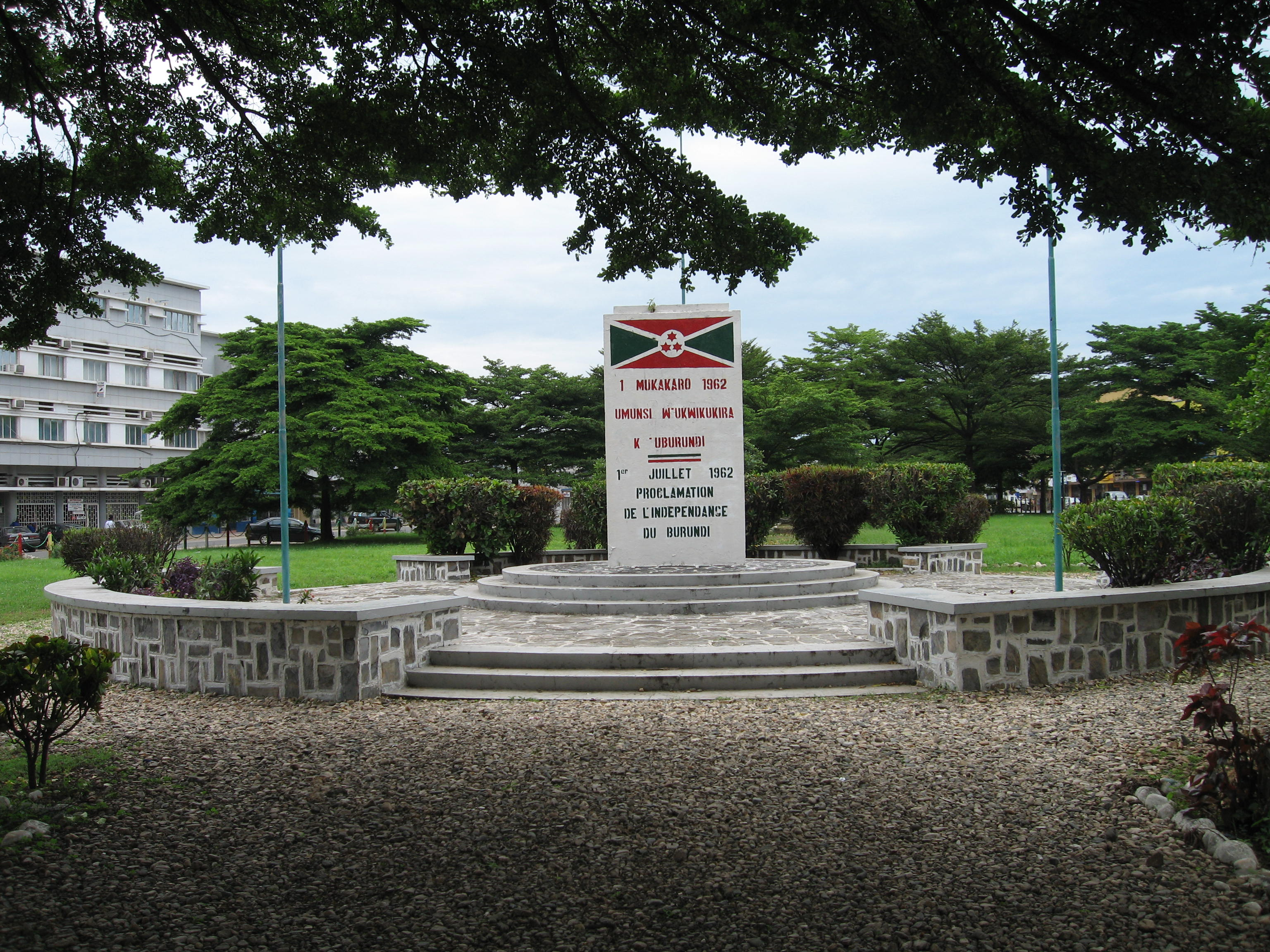
Independence Square and monument in Bujumbura

In January 1959 King Mwami Mwambutsa IV requested Burundi's independence from Belgium and dissolution of the Ruanda-Urundi union. In the following months, Burundian political parties began to advocate for the end of Belgian colonial rule and the separation of Rwanda and Burundi. The first and largest of these political parties was the Union for National Progress (UPRONA). The push for independence was influenced by the Rwandan Revolution and the accompanying instability and ethnic conflict that occurred there, which brought many Rwandan Tutsi refugees to Burundi from 1959 to 1961.

Burundi's first elections took place in September 1961, and UPRONA—a multi-ethnic unity party led by Prince Louis Rwagasore—won over 80% of the votes. In the wake of the elections on 13 October, the 29-year-old Prince Rwagasore was assassinated, robbing Burundi of its most popular and well-known nationalist.

The country claimed independence on 1 July 1962 and legally changed its name from Ruanda-Urundi to Burundi. Burundi became a constitutional monarchy with Mwami Mwambutsa IV, Prince Rwagasore's father, serving as the country's king. On 18 September 1962 Burundi joined the United Nations.

In 1963, Mwambutsa appointed a Hutu prime minister, Pierre Ngendandumwe, but he was assassinated on 15 January 1965 by a Rwandan Tutsi employed by the US Embassy. The assassination occurred in the broader context of the Congo Crisis during which Western anti-communist countries were confronting the communist People's Republic of China as it attempted to make Burundi a logistics base for communist insurgents battling in Congo. Parliamentary elections in 1965 brought a majority of Hutu into the parliament, but when Mwambutsa appointed a Tutsi prime minister, some Hutu felt this was unjust, and ethnic tensions were further increased. In October 1965 an attempted coup led by the Hutu-dominated police was carried out but failed. The Tutsi dominated army, led by Captain Michel Micombero, purged Hutu from their ranks and carried out reprisal attacks which ultimately claimed the lives of up to 5,000 people.

Mwambutsa, who had fled the country during the October coup, was deposed by a coup in July 1966, and his teenage son, Prince Ntare V, claimed the throne. In November 1966 Prime Minister Micombero carried out another coup, this time deposing Ntare, abolishing the monarchy and declaring the nation a republic, though his one-party government was effectively a military dictatorship. As president, Micombero became an advocate of African socialism and received support from the People's Republic of China. He imposed a staunch regime of law and order and sharply repressed Hutu militarism.

=== Genocides ===
An estimated total of 250,000 people died in Burundi from the various conflicts between 1962 and 1993. Since Burundi's independence in 1962, two genocides have taken place: the 1972 mass killings of Hutus by the Tutsi-dominated army, and the mass killings of Tutsis in 1993 by the Hutu majority. Both are described as genocides in the final report of the International Commission of Inquiry for Burundi presented in 2002 to the United Nations Security Council.

On 27 April 1972 a rebellion led by Hutu members of the gendarmerie broke out in the lakeside towns of Rumonge and Nyanza-Lac, and the rebels declared the short-lived Martyazo Republic. The rebels attacked both Tutsi and any Hutu who refused to join their rebellion. During this initial Hutu outbreak, between 800 and 1,200 people were killed. At the same time, Ntare V returned from exile, heightening political tension in the country. On 29 April the 24-year-old Ntare was assassinated. In subsequent months, the Tutsi-dominated government of Micombero used the army to combat Hutu rebels and commit genocide, murdering targeted members of the Hutu majority. The total number of casualties was never established, but contemporary estimates put the number of people killed between 80,000 and 210,000. In addition, several hundred thousand Hutu were estimated to have fled the killings into Zaïre, Rwanda and Tanzania.

Following the civil war and genocide, Micombero became mentally distraught and withdrawn. In 1976 Colonel Jean-Baptiste Bagaza, a Tutsi, led a bloodless coup to topple Micombero and set about promoting reform. His administration drafted a constitution in 1981, which maintained Burundi's status as a one-party state. In 1984 Bagaza was elected head of state. During his tenure, Bagaza suppressed political opponents and religious freedoms. Major Pierre Buyoya, a Tutsi, overthrew Bagaza in 1987, suspended the constitution, and dissolved political parties. He reinstated military rule. Anti-Tutsi ethnic propaganda led to 1988 killings of Tutsi peasants in northern villages of Ntega and Marangara.

The Buyoya regime did not unleash the harsh reprisals of 1972. Its effort to gain public trust was eroded when it decreed an amnesty for those who had called for, carried out, and taken credit for the killings. Analysts have called this period the beginning of the "culture of impunity." Other analysts put the origins of the "culture of impunity" earlier, in 1965 and 1972, when a small number of identifiable Hutus unleashed mass killings of Tutsis.

In the aftermath of the killings, a group of Hutu intellectuals wrote an open letter to Buyoya, asking for more representation of the Hutu in the administration. They were arrested and jailed. A few weeks later, Buyoya appointed a new government with an equal number of Hutu and Tutsi ministers. He appointed Adrien Sibomana (Hutu) as prime minister. Buyoya also created a commission to address issues of national unity. In 1992, the government created a constitution that provided for a multi-party system.

=== Civil war and early democracy project ===
Melchior Ndadaye, leader of the Hutu-dominated Front for Democracy in Burundi (FRODEBU), won the 1993 Burundian presidential election. He became the first Hutu head of state, leading a pro-Hutu government. Though he attempted to smooth the country's bitter ethnic divide, his reforms antagonised soldiers in the Tutsi-dominated army, and he was assassinated amidst a failed military coup in October 1993, after only three months in office. The ensuing Burundian Civil War (1993–2005) saw persistent violence between Hutu rebels and the Tutsi majority army. It is estimated that some 300,000 people, mostly civilians, were killed in the years following the assassination.

In early 1994, the parliament elected Cyprien Ntaryamira (Hutu) as president. He and President Juvénal Habyarimana of Rwanda, both Hutus, died together when their airplane was shot down in April 1994. More refugees started fleeing to Rwanda. Speaker of Parliament, Sylvestre Ntibantunganya (Hutu), was appointed as president in October 1994. A coalition government involving 12 of the 13 parties was formed. A feared general massacre was averted, but violence broke out. Hutu refugees in Bujumbura were killed. The mainly Tutsi Union for National Progress withdrew from the government and parliament.

Pierre Buyoya (Tutsi) again took power through a coup d'état in 1996. He suspended the constitution and was sworn in as president in 1998. In response to rebel attacks, the government forced much of the population to move to refugee camps. Under Buyoya's rule, long peace talks started, mediated by South Africa. Both parties signed agreements to share power. The agreements took four years to plan.

Belligerents of the Second Congo War. Burundi backed the rebels.

In 2000, a transitional government was planned as a part of the Arusha Peace and Reconciliation Agreement. The transitional government was placed on a trial basis for five years. After several aborted ceasefires, a 2001 peace plan and power-sharing agreement was relatively successful. A ceasefire was signed in 2003 between the Tutsi-controlled Burundian government and the largest Hutu rebel group, National Council for the Defense of Democracy – Forces for the Defense of Democracy (CNDD–FDD).

In 2003, FRODEBU leader Domitien Ndayizeye (Hutu) became president. In early 2005, ethnic quotas were formed for determining positions in Burundi's government. Throughout the year, elections for parliament and president occurred. Pierre Nkurunziza (Hutu), once a leader of a rebel group, was elected president in 2005.

==== Peace agreements ====
African leaders began a series of peace talks between the warring factions following a request by the United Nations Secretary General Boutros Boutros-Ghali for them to intervene in the humanitarian crisis. Talks were initiated under the aegis of former Tanzanian President Julius Nyerere in 1995; following his death, South African President Nelson Mandela took the helm. As the talks progressed, South African President Thabo Mbeki and United States President Bill Clinton also contributed to the accords.

The main objective was to transform the structure of both the Burundian government and military to bridge the ethnic gap between the Tutsi and Hutu. A two step approach was formulated. First, a transitional power-sharing government would be established, with the presidents holding office for three year elected terms. The second objective was to restructure the armed forces with equal representation between both ethnic groups.

As the protracted nature of the peace talks demonstrated, the mediators and negotiating parties confronted several obstacles. First, the Burundian officials perceived the goals as "unrealistic" and viewed the treaty as ambiguous, contradictory and confusing. Officials also believed the treaty would be irrelevant without an accompanying ceasefire. This would require separate and direct talks with the rebel groups. The main Hutu party was sceptical of the offer of a power-sharing government; they alleged that they had been deceived by the Tutsi in past agreements.

In 2000 Ndayizeye signed the treaty, as well as 13 of the 19 warring Hutu and Tutsi factions. Disagreements persisted over which group would preside over the nascent government and when the ceasefire would begin. The spoilers of the peace talks were the hardliner Tutsi and Hutu groups who refused to sign the accord; as a result, violence intensified. In 2003 at a summit of African leaders in Tanzania, the Burundian president and the main opposition Hutu group signed an accord to end the conflict; the signatory members were granted ministerial posts within the government. However, smaller militant Hutu groups – such as the Forces for National Liberation – remained active.

==== UN involvement ====
Between 1993 and 2003, many rounds of peace talks gradually established power-sharing agreements to satisfy the majority of the contending groups. Initially the South African Protection Support Detachment was deployed to protect Burundian leaders returning from exile. These forces became part of the African Union Mission to Burundi, deployed to help oversee the installation of a transitional government. In June 2004, the UN stepped in and took over peacekeeping responsibilities as a signal of growing international support for the already markedly advanced peace process.

The mission's mandate, under Chapter VII of the United Nations Charter, was to monitor cease-fire, carry out disarmament, demobilisation and reintegration of former military personnel, support humanitarian assistance and refugee and IDP return, assist with elections, protect international staff and Burundian civilians, monitor Burundi's troublesome borders, including halting illicit arms flows, and assist in carrying out institutional reforms including those of the constitution, judiciary, armed forces and police. The mission has been allotted 5,650 military personnel, 120 civilian police and about 1,000 international and local civilian personnel. The mission has been functioning well. It has greatly benefited from the transitional government, which has functioned and is in the process of transitioning to one that will be popularly elected.

The main difficulty in the early stages was continued resistance to the peace process by the last Hutu nationalist rebel group. This organisation continued its violent conflict on the outskirts of the capital despite the UN's presence. By June 2005, the group had stopped fighting and its representatives were brought back into the political process. All political parties have accepted a formula for inter-ethnic power-sharing: no political party can gain access to government offices unless it is ethnically integrated.

The focus of the UN's mission had been to enshrine the power-sharing arrangements in a popularly voted constitution, so that elections may be held and a new government installed. Disarmament, demobilisation and reintegration were done in tandem with elections preparations. The 2005 constitution was approved with over 90% of the popular vote. The constitution formalised a complex power-sharing architecture that has been described as "associational" in its logic, as it aims to provide guarantees of representation for the Tutsi minority without entrenching the ethnic cleavage at the centre of Burundian politics. This institutional design provides an original contribution from Burundian negotiators and constitution makers to institutional options to manage ethnic conflict.

=== Post-conflict reconstruction ===
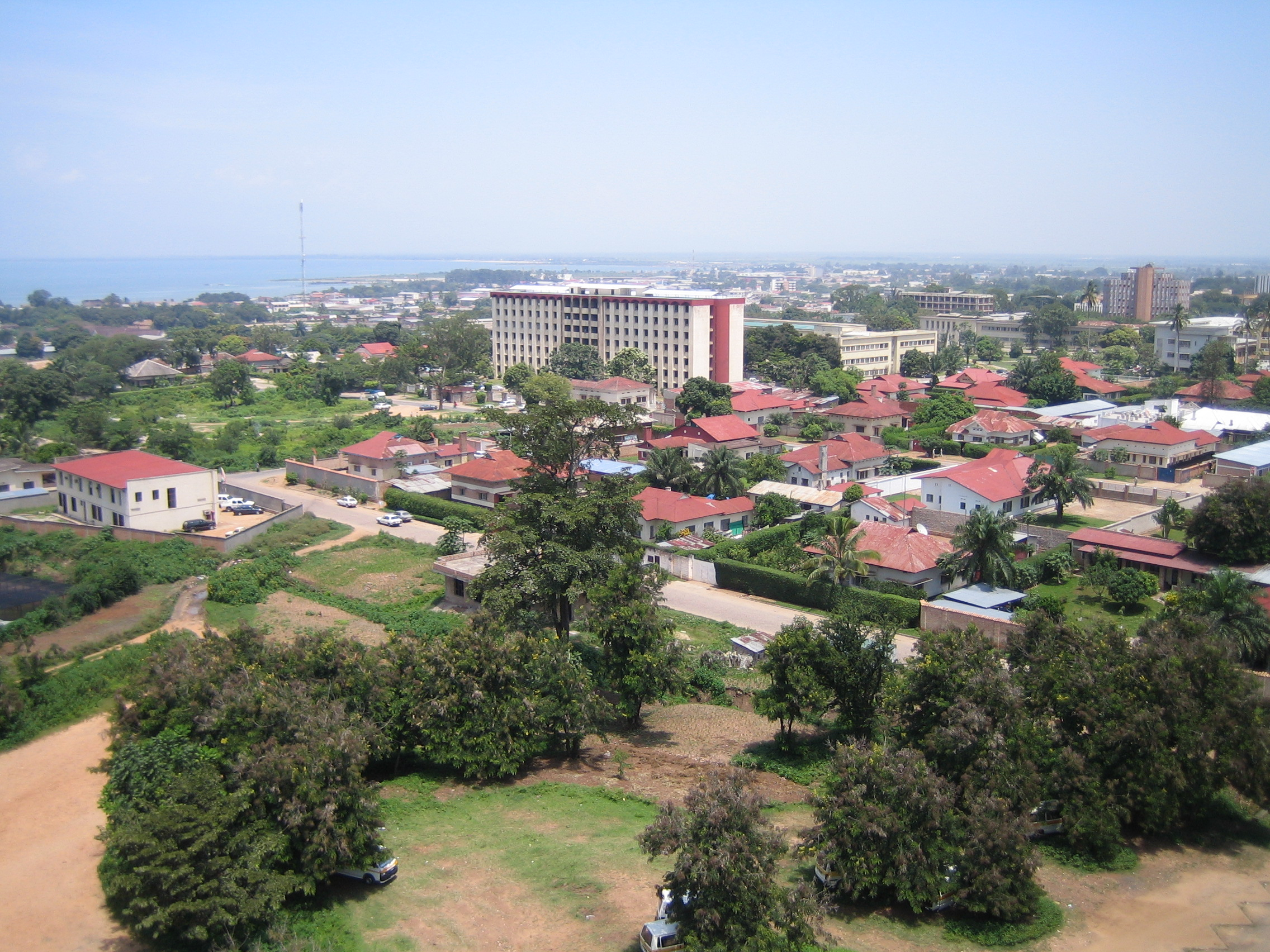
Bujumbura

Reconstruction efforts started to practically take effect after 2006. The UN shut down its peacekeeping mission and focused on helping with reconstruction. Toward achieving economic reconstruction, Rwanda, D.R.Congo and Burundi relaunched the regional Economic Community of the Great Lakes Countries. Burundi and Rwanda joined the East African Community in 2007.

However, the terms of the September 2006 ceasefire between the government and the last remaining armed opposition group, the FLN (Forces for National Liberation, also called NLF or FROLINA), was not fully implemented, and senior FLN members subsequently left the truce monitoring team, claiming that their security was threatened. In September 2007, rival FLN factions clashed in the capital, killing 20 fighters and causing residents to flee. Rebel raids were reported in other parts of the country. The rebel factions disagreed with the government over disarmament and the release of political prisoners. In late 2007 and early 2008, FLN combatants attacked government-protected camps where former combatants were living. The homes of rural residents were also pillaged.

A 2007 Amnesty International report mentions the country's shortcomings on human rights. Civilians are victims of repeated acts of violence done by the FLN. The FLN also recruits child soldiers. The rate of violence against women is high. Perpetrators regularly escape prosecution and punishment by the state. There is an urgent need for reform of the judicial system.

In 2008, the FLN sought for the parliament to adopt a law guaranteeing them 'provisional immunity' from arrest. Parliament denied the request. This would have covered ordinary crimes but not grave violations of international humanitarian law like war crimes or crimes against humanity. On 17 April 2008, the FLN bombarded Bujumbura. The Burundian army fought back and the FLN suffered heavy losses. A ceasefire was signed in May. In August, President Nkurunziza met with the FLN leader Agathon Rwasa, with the mediation of Charles Nqakula, South Africa's Minister for Safety and Security. Both agreed to meet twice a week to establish a commission to resolve any disputes that might arise during the peace negotiations.

In the early 2010s, the UN peacekeeping mission in Burundi sought to assess the success of its Disarmament, Demobilisation and Reintegration program by counting the number of arms that had been collected, given the prevalence of arms in the country. However, these evaluations failed to include data from local populations, which are significant in impact evaluations of peace-building initiatives.

Burundi has participated in African Union peacekeeping missions, including a mission to Somalia against Al-Shabaab militants. In 2014, the Truth and Reconciliation Commission was established.

==== 2015 civil unrest ====
In April 2015 protests broke out after the ruling party announced Nkurunziza would seek a third term in office. Protestors claimed Nkurunziza could not run for a third term in office, but the constitutional court agreed with Nkurunziza (although some of its members had fled the country at the time of its vote).

An attempted coup d'état on 13 May failed to depose Nkurunziza. He returned to Burundi, began purging his government, and arrested several of the coup leaders. Following the attempted coup, however, protests continued; over 100,000 people had fled the country by 20 May, causing a humanitarian emergency. There are reports of continued and widespread abuses of human rights, including unlawful killings, torture, disappearances, and restrictions on freedom of expression.

Despite calls by the United Nations, the African Union, the United States, France, South Africa, Belgium, and various other governments to refrain, the ruling party held parliamentary elections on 29 June, but these were boycotted by the opposition. The United Nations Human Rights Council established the Commission of Inquiry on Burundi through resolution 33/24. Its mandate was to "conduct a thorough investigation into human rights violations and abuses committed in Burundi since April 2015, to identify alleged perpetrators and to formulate recommendations." The Commission called on the government to put an end to serious human rights violations. It stressed "The Burundian government has so far refused to cooperate with the Commission of Inquiry, despite the Commission's repeated requests and initiatives." The violations the Commission documented include arbitrary arrests and detentions, acts of torture and cruel, inhuman or degrading treatment, extrajudicial executions, enforced disappearances, rape and other forms of sexual violence.

==== Present day ====
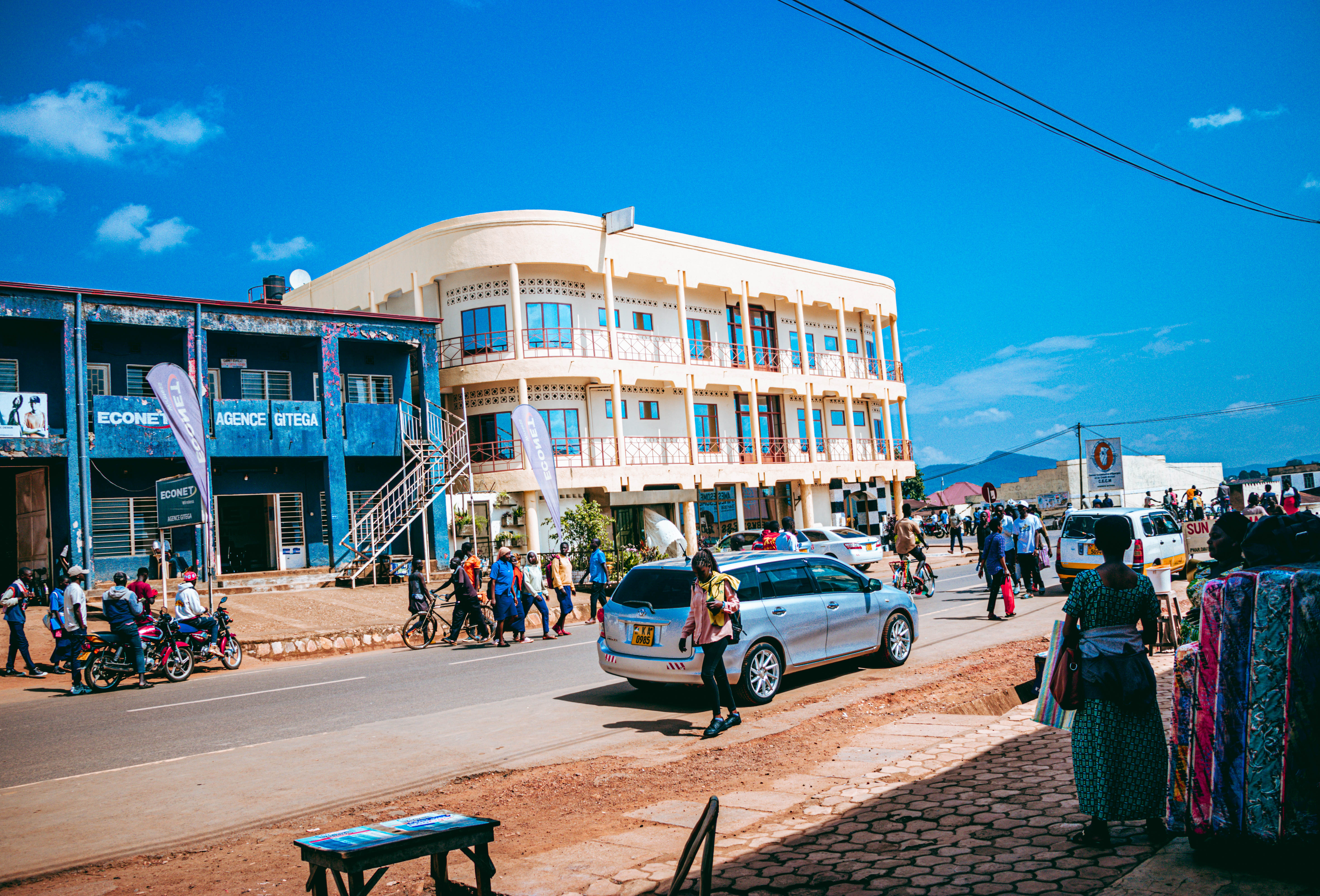
Gitega became the political capital of Burundi in 2019.

In a 2018 constitutional referendum, Burundians voted to approve an amended constitution that ensured that Nkurunziza could remain in power until 2034. However, much to the surprise of most observers, Nkurunziza later announced that he did not intend to serve another term, paving the way for a new president to be elected in the 2020 general election. Evariste Ndayishimiye, a candidate who was hand-picked as Nkurunziza's successor by the CNDD-FDD, won the election. Shortly after on 9 June, Nkurunziza died of a cardiac arrest, at age 55. As per the constitution, Pascal Nyabenda, the president of the national assembly, led the government until Ndayishimiye's inauguration on 18 June 2020.

In December 2021, a prison fire killed dozens in Gitega. In November 2022, in challenges to the COVID-19 pandemic and the Russian invasion of Ukraine, Burundi's economic growth increased slightly to 3 percent, according to an assessment of the International Monetary Fund. Currently, Burundi remains as one of the world's poorest countries, based on an estimated gross national income (GNI) of US$298 per capita.

The fall of Goma in the Democratic Republic of the Congo in January 2025 was the largest escalation of the conflict in Kivu since 2012 and raised concerns that the Rwandan-backed M23 rebel campaign could turn into a larger regional war due to the presence of troops from Rwanda and Burundi in the Kivu provinces. Thousands of soldiers had been deployed to assist the Congolese army in South Kivu by Burundi, which has a Hutu-dominated government and previously accused Rwanda of backing a 2015 coup attempt, adding to concern for the potential of a larger regional war.

== Government ==
=== Politics ===
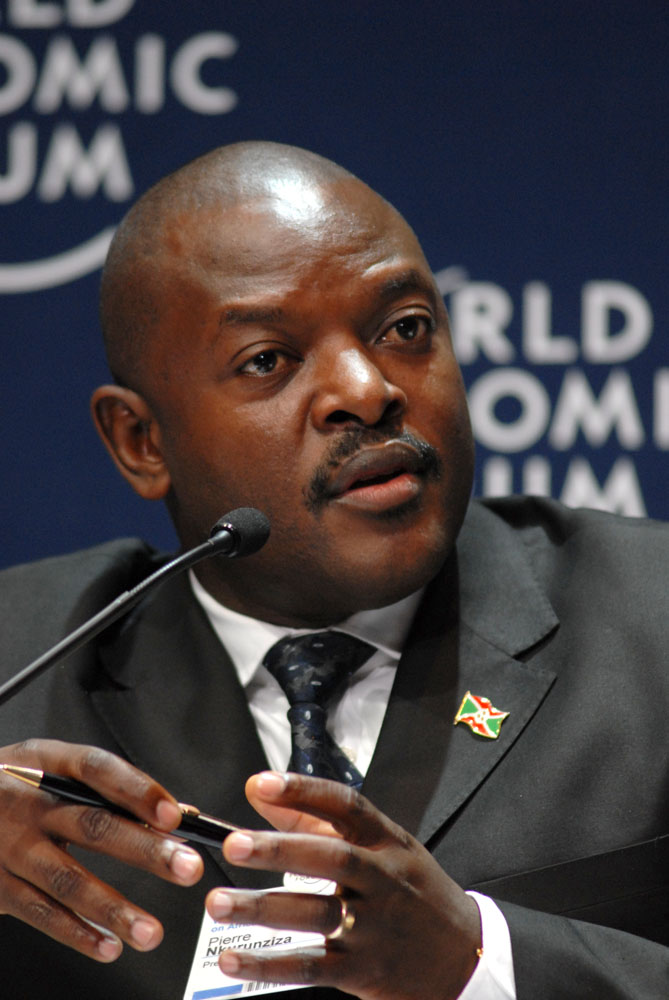
Pierre Nkurunziza, President of Burundi from 2005 to 2020

Burundi is a presidential representative democratic republic based upon a multi-party state. The president is the head of state and head of government. There are currently 21 registered parties in Burundi. The 1992 constitution established a multi-party political process and reflected multi-party competition. The 1998 constitution broadened the National Assembly's seats and made provisions for two vice-presidents.

The legislative branch is a bicameral assembly, consisting of the National Assembly and the Senate. The National Assembly consists of 118 to 123 members. Burundi's constitution mandates representation to be consistent with 60% Hutu, 40% Tutsi, and 30% female members, as well as three Twa members. Members are elected by popular vote and serve five-year terms.

The Senate has fifty-one members, and three seats are reserved for former presidents. 30% of Senate members must be female. Members are elected by electoral colleges, which consist of members from each of Burundi's provinces and communes. For each of the provinces, one Hutu and one Tutsi senator are chosen. One term for the Senate is five years.

Together, Burundi's legislative branch elect the president to a five-year term. The president appoints officials to his council of ministers, which is also part of the executive branch. The president can also pick 14 members of the Senate to serve on the council of ministers. Members of the council of ministers must be approved by two-thirds of Burundi's legislature. The president also chooses two vice-presidents.

The Cour Suprême (Supreme Court) is the highest court. There are three Courts of Appeal directly below the Supreme Court. Tribunals of First Instance are used as judicial courts in each of the provinces as well as 123 local tribunals.

=== Administrative divisions ===
Map of the provinces of Burundi as of 2025

Burundi's provinces and communes were created in 1959 by a Belgian colonial decree. They replaced the pre-existing system of chieftains. The country is currently divided into five provinces: Buhumuza, Bujumbura, Burunga, Butanyerera, and Gitega. In 2000, the province encompassing Bujumbura was separated into two provinces, Bujumbura Rural and Bujumbura Mairie. There are 119 communes and 3,044 collines (hills).

== Human rights ==
In 2009 the government criminalised homosexuality. Persons found guilty of consensual same-sex relations risk three months to two years in prison and/or a fine of 50,000 to 100,000 Burundian francs. Amnesty International has condemned the action, calling it a violation of Burundi's obligations under international and regional human rights law, and against the constitution, which guarantees the right to privacy.

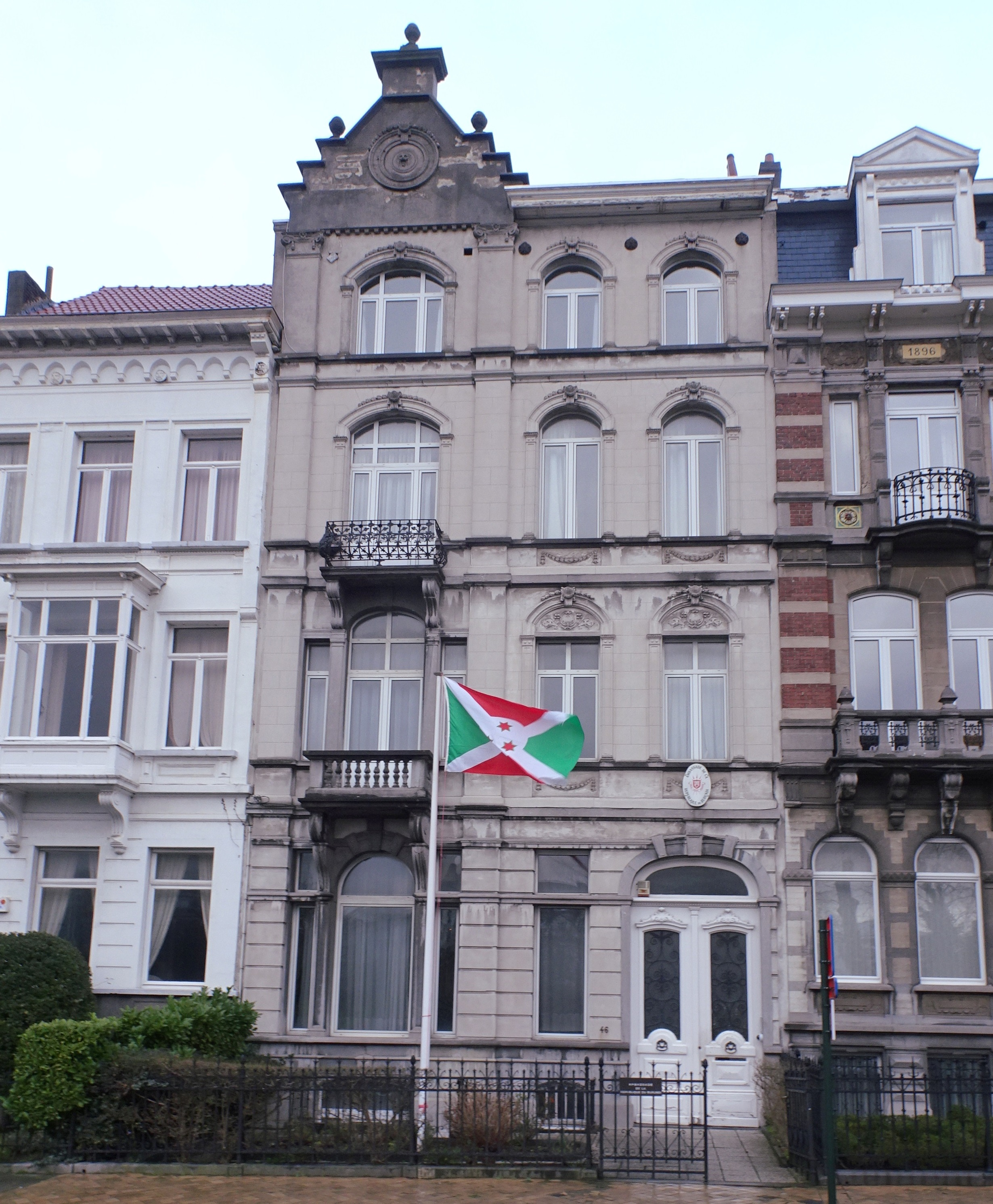
Embassy of Burundi in Brussels

Burundi officially left the International Criminal Court (ICC) in 2017, the first country in the world to do so. The move came after the UN accused the country of various crimes and human rights violations, such as extrajudicial killings, torture and sexual violence, in a September 2017 report. The ICC announced in November that human rights violations from the time Burundi was a member would still be prosecuted.

Censorship by the government remain at risk in the country. Government was criticised for the multiple arrests and 2010 trials of journalist Jean-Claude Kavumbagu for his reporting. Amnesty International named him a prisoner of conscience and called for his "immediate and unconditional release."

== Geography ==
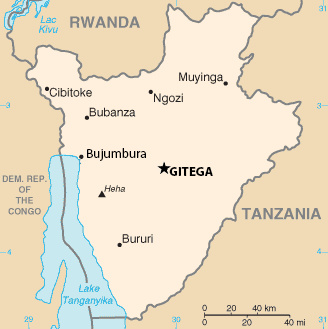
Map of Burundi

One of the smallest countries in Africa, Burundi is landlocked and has an equatorial climate. Burundi is a part of the Albertine Rift, the western extension of the East African Rift. The country lies on a rolling plateau in the centre of Africa. Burundi is bordered by Rwanda to the north, Tanzania to the east and southeast, and the Democratic Republic of the Congo to the west. It lies within the Albertine Rift montane forests, Central Zambezian miombo woodlands, and Victoria Basin forest-savanna mosaic ecoregions.

The average elevation of the central plateau is 1,707 m (5,600 ft), with lower elevations at the borders. The highest peak, Mount Heha at 2,685 m (8,810 ft), lies to the southeast of the largest city and economic capital, Bujumbura. The source of the Nile River is in Bururi Province, where the eastern slope of the central mountain region gives rise to the Rwanda River, one of the sources of the Nile. This source is linked from Lake Victoria to its headwaters via the Ruvyironza River. Lake Victoria is an important water source, which feeds the Kagera River. Another major lake is Lake Tanganyika, located in southwestern Burundi corner.

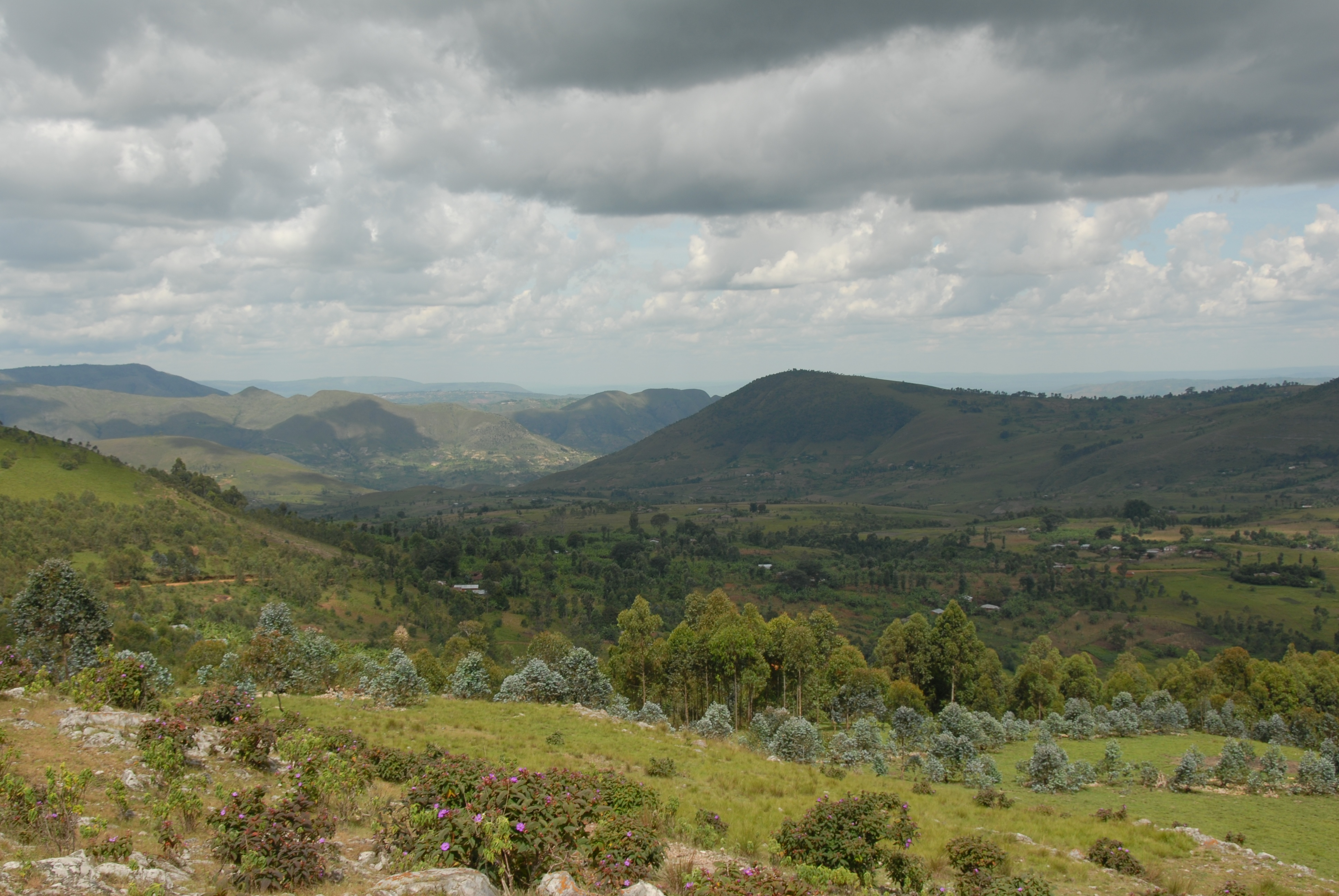
Landscape of Burundi.

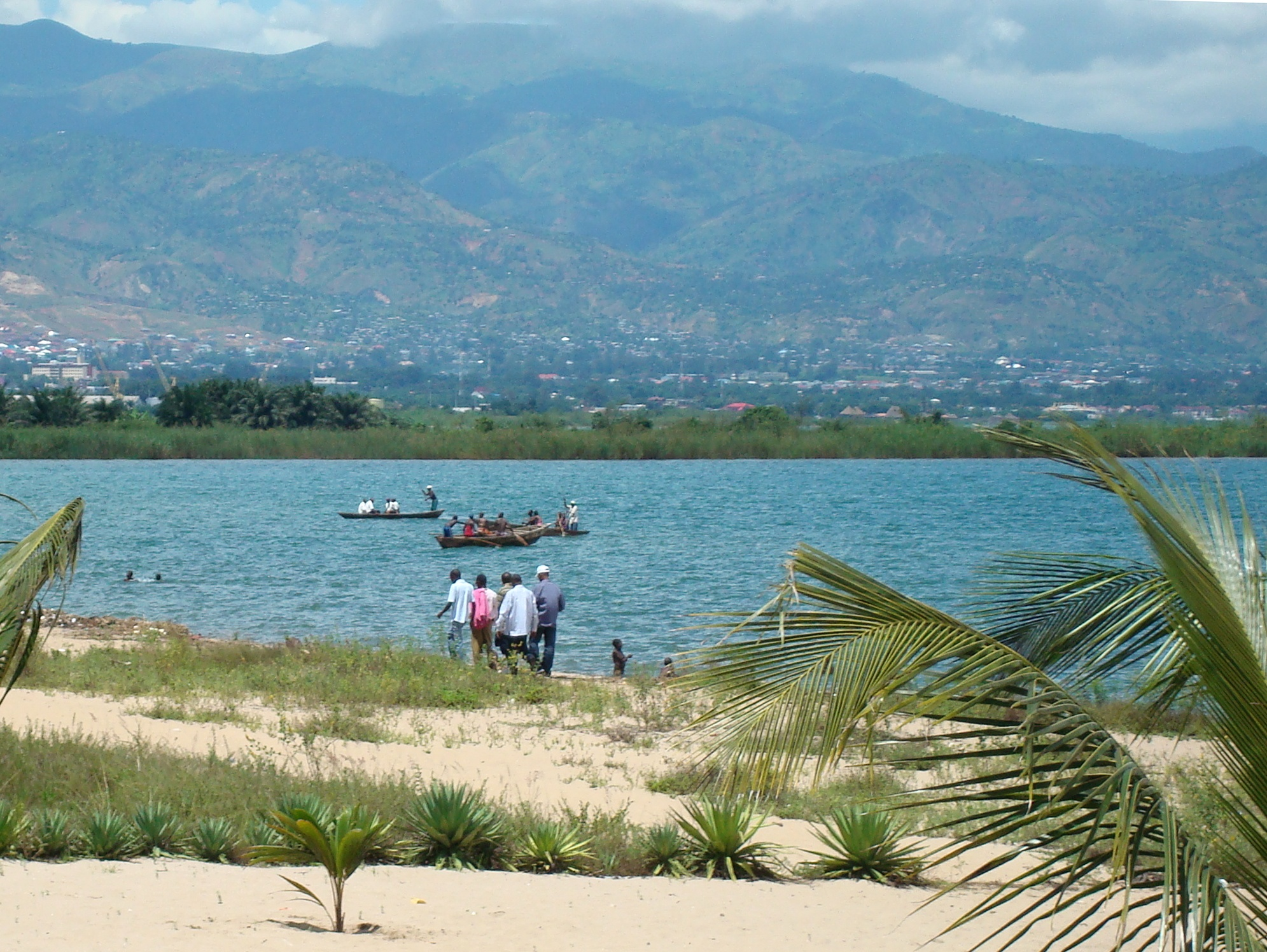
Bujumbura on the banks of Lake Tanganyika.

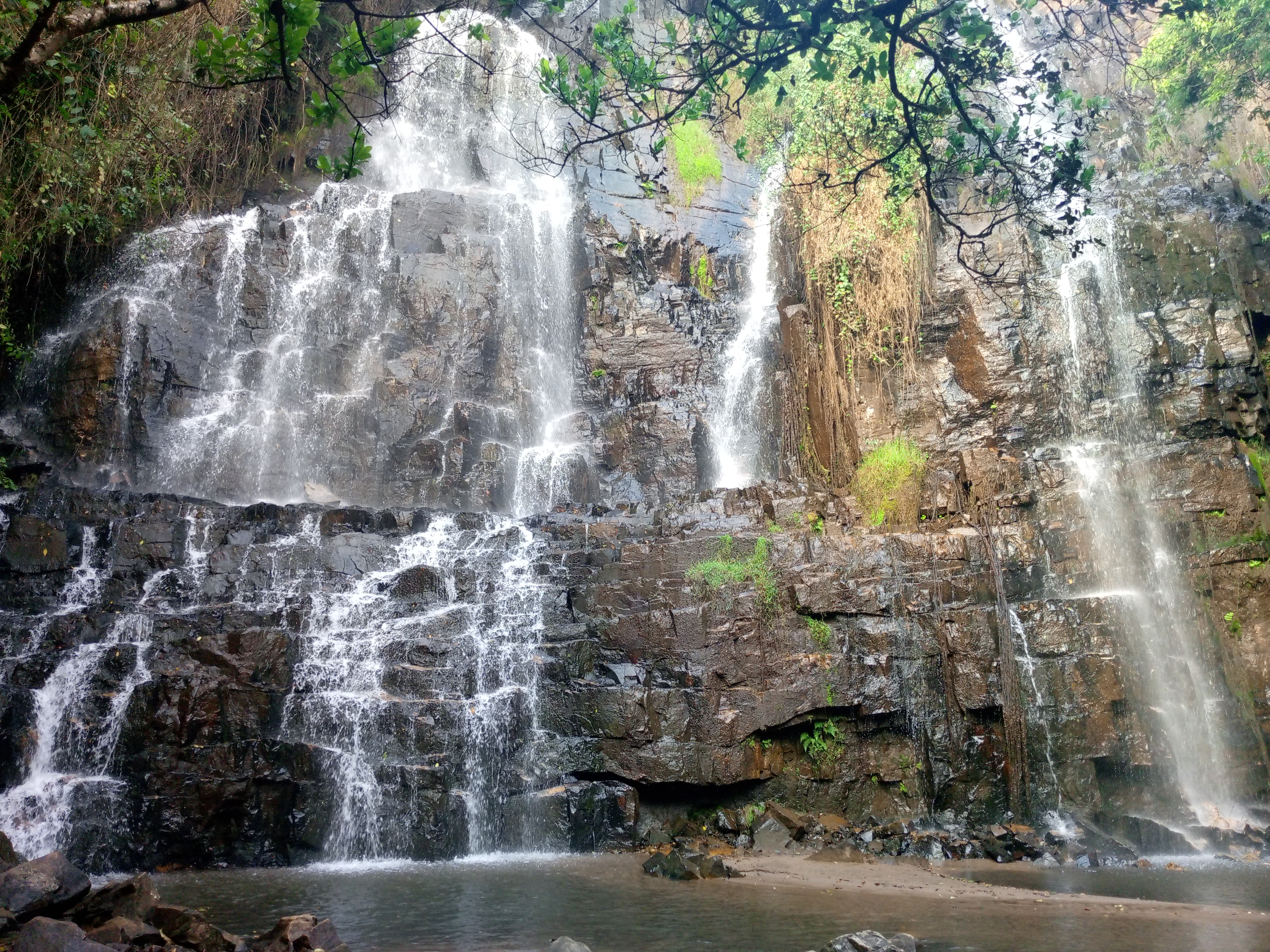
View of the Karera waterfalls.

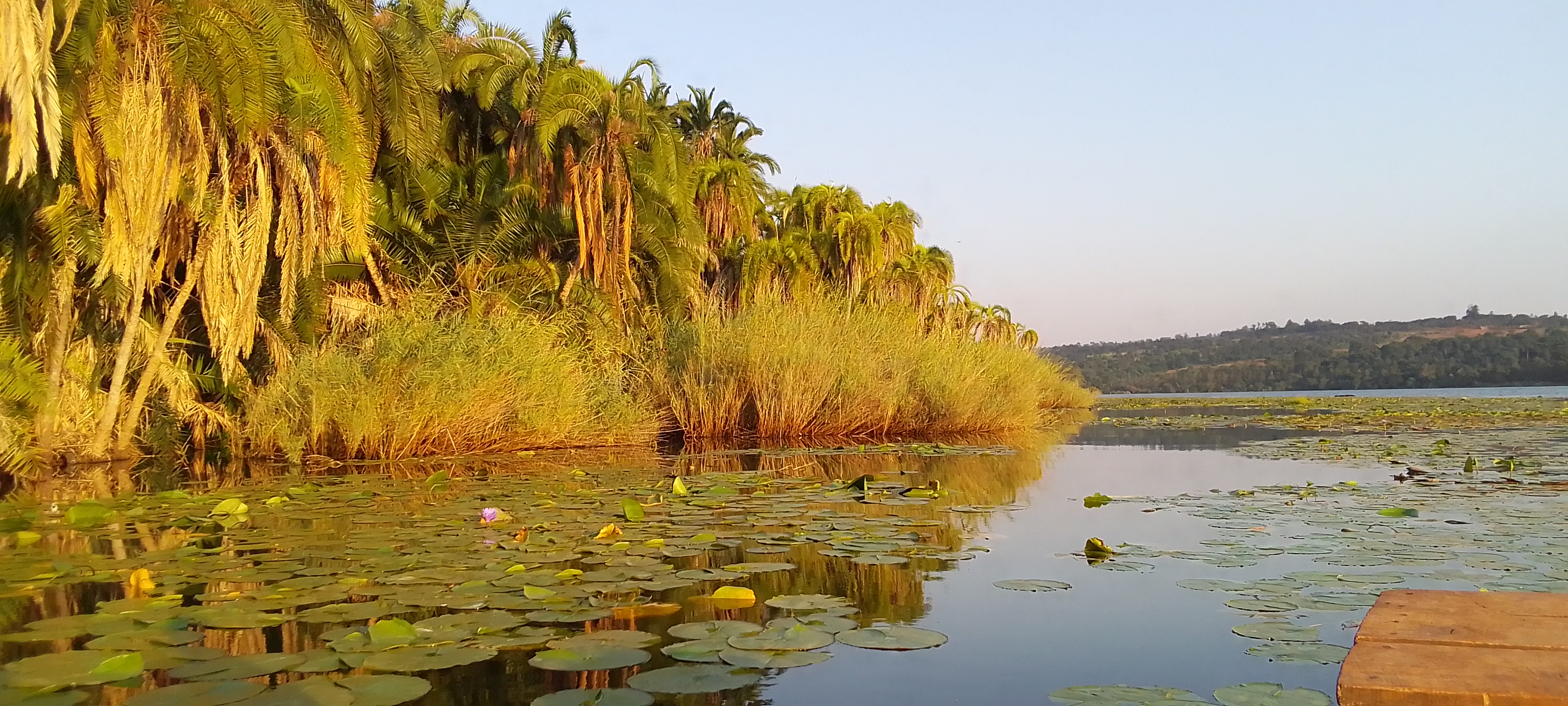
Trees beside Lake Rwihinda, often called Bird Lake ("Lac aux oiseaux" in French)

Forest cover is around 11% of the total land area, equivalent to 279,640 hectares (ha) of forest in 2020. In 1990, forest cover comprised 276,480 hectares (ha) of land cover. Burundi did not meet its target of increasing forests to 20% of land use by 2000, due to pressures of deforestation for logging, firewood, and agriculture. In 2015, 100% of the forest area was reported to be under public ownership.

In the north, along the Congo-Nile ridge is the Bururi Forest Nature Reserve, a 3,300 ha protected forest area. The reserve offers ecological benefits, including the absorption of seasonal flood waters. The Rumonge Forest Natural Reserve is in the southwest. Illegal farming and desertification threaten the existence of these dense forest areas. In addition to the expansion of subsistence agriculture and fuelwood collection, illegal logging threatens the forests.

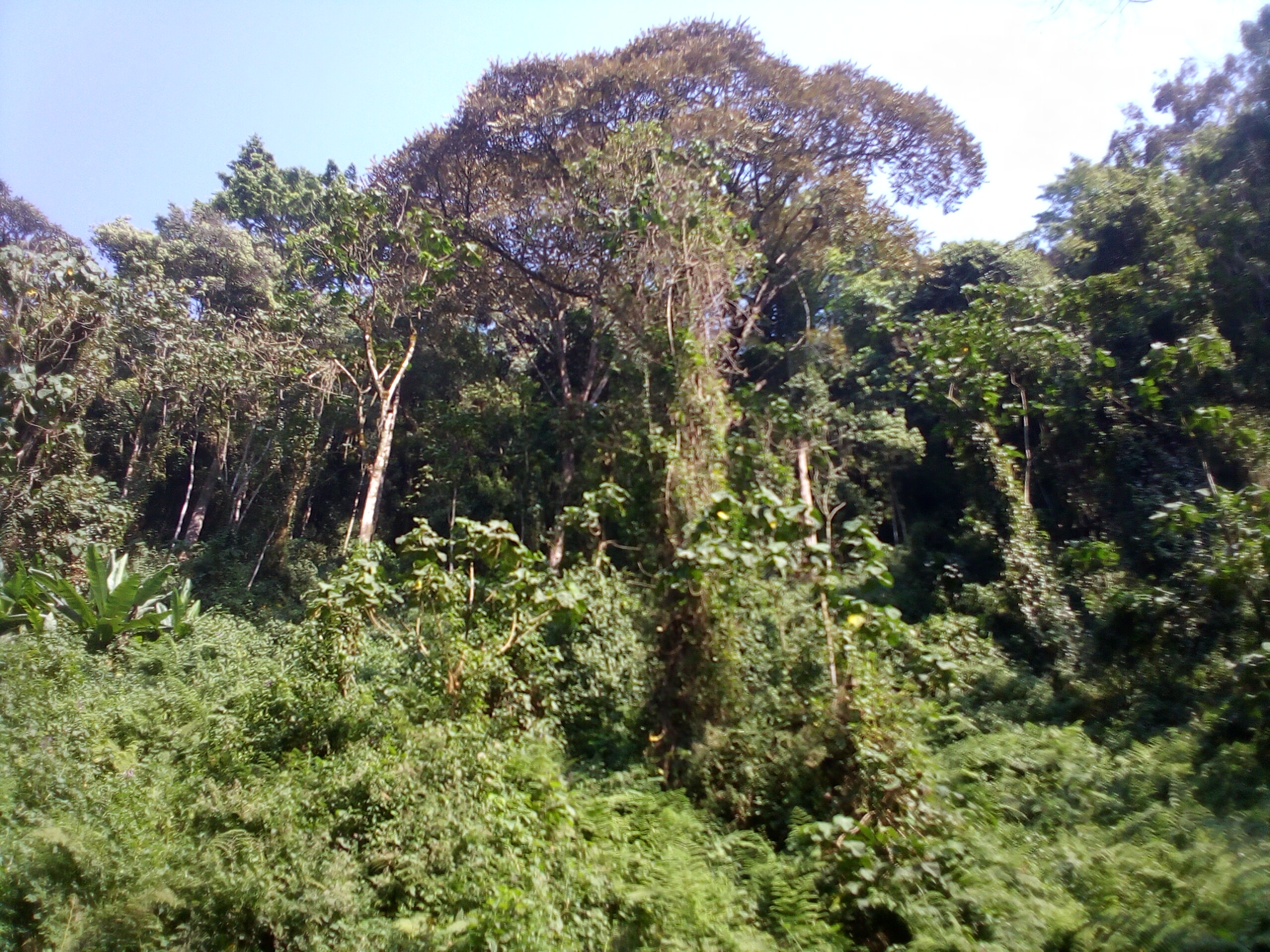
View of the Kibira National Park

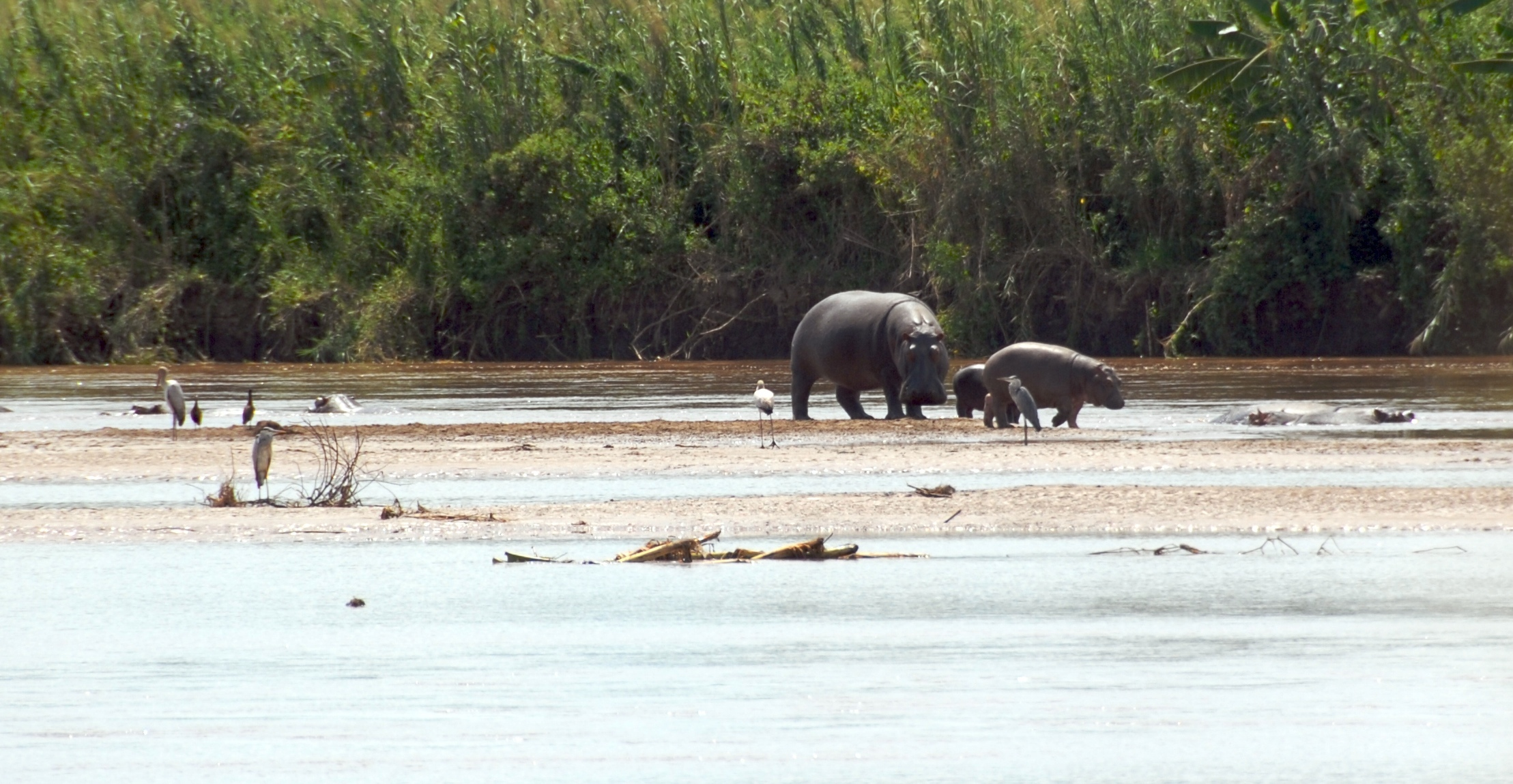
Hippopotamus in the Rusizi National Park.

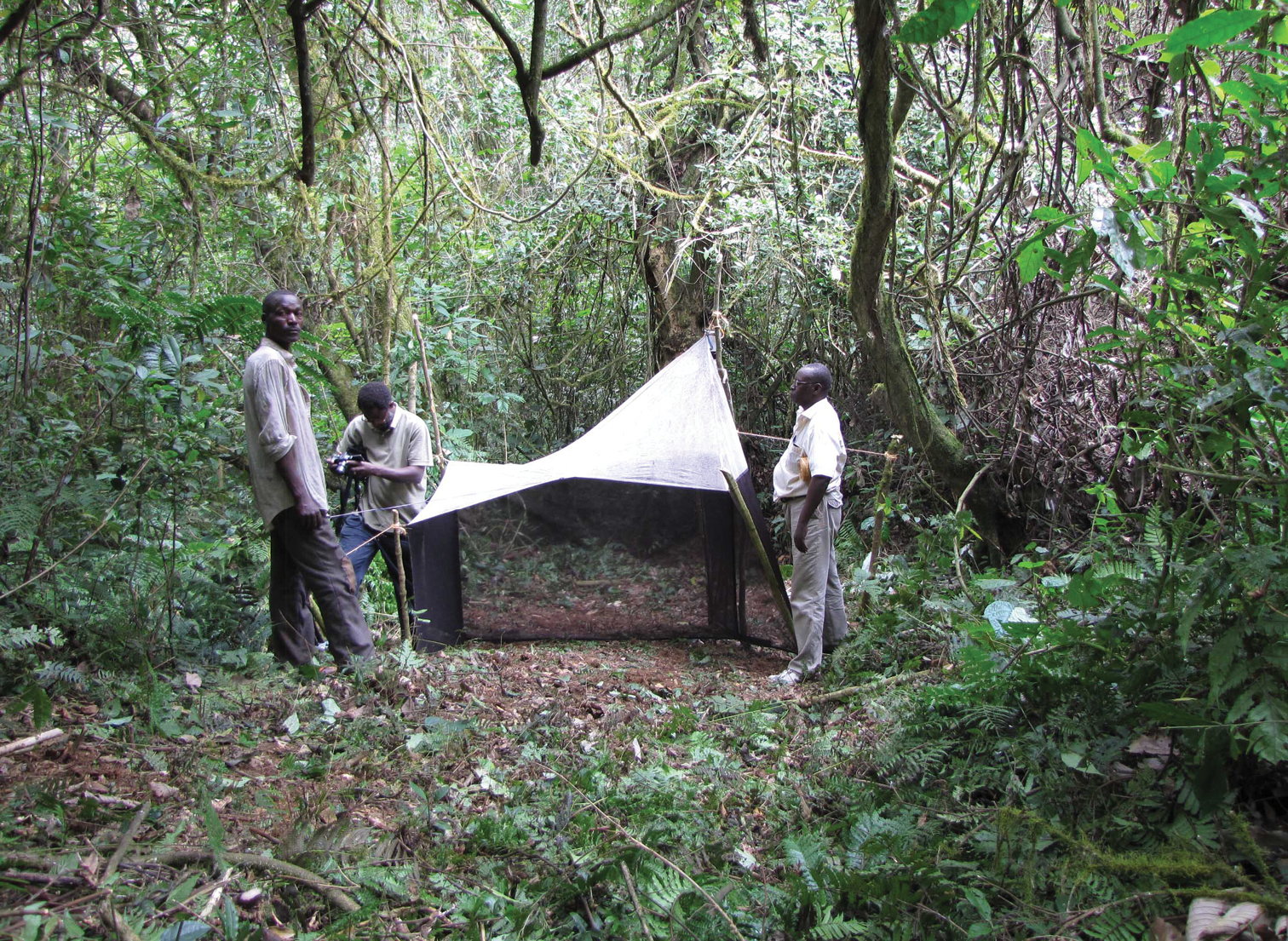
Inside the Bururi Forest Nature Reserve.

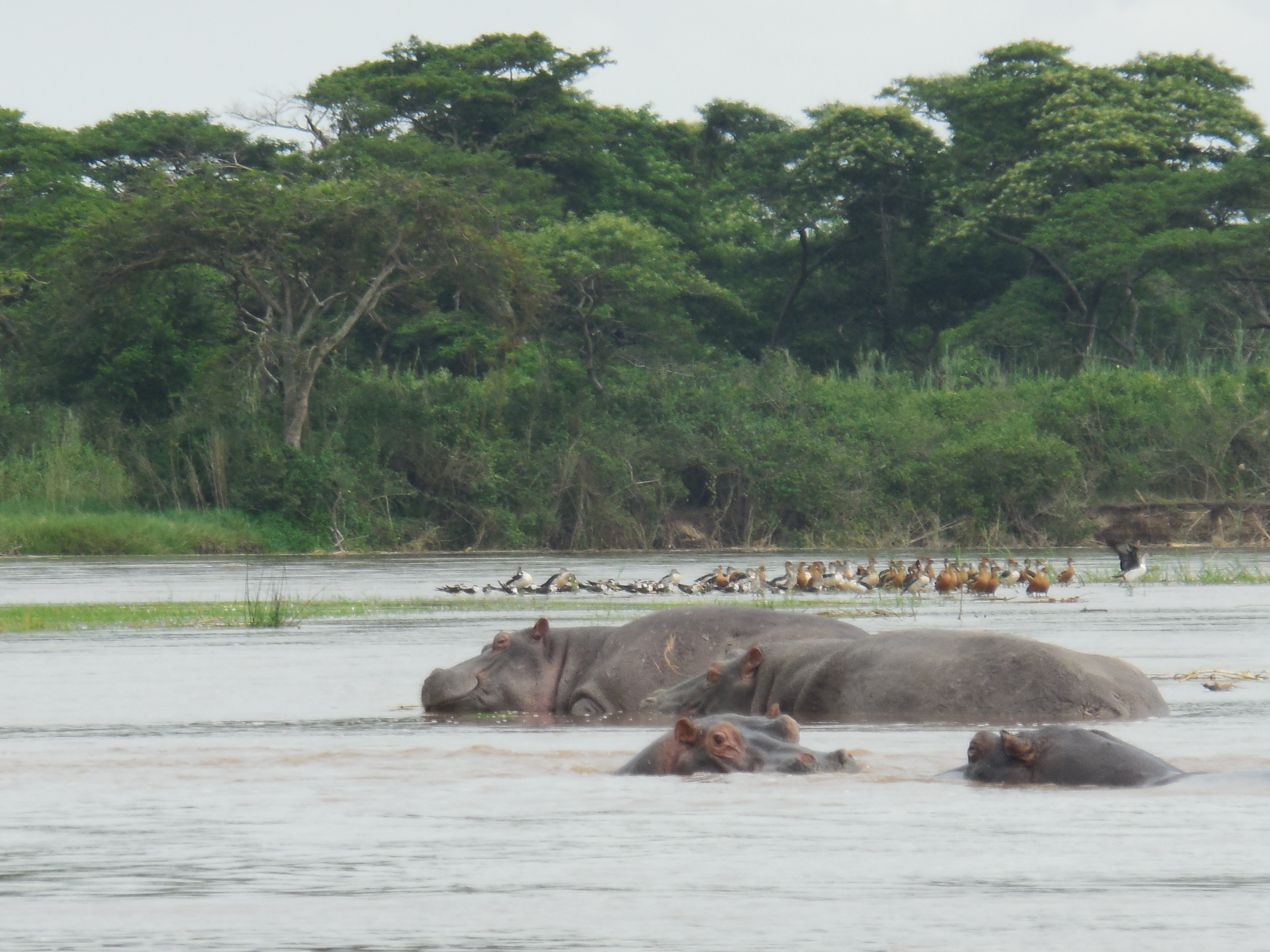
Hippopotamus, one of the most common animals in Burundi

There are two national parks: Kibira National Park to the northwest (a small region of rainforest, adjacent to Nyungwe Forest National Park in Rwanda), and Ruvubu National Park to the northeast (along the Ruvubu River). Both were established in 1982 to conserve wildlife populations. Kibira National Park contains mountain forest and supplies nearly two thirds of the water that fill Burundi's largest dam.

The Miombo woodlands, which stretch across parts of Burundi, are the location of intense illegal logging activity, focused on extracting hardwoods for export to China. Despite the 2024 Maputo Agreement to expand the protection of the area and ban the extraction of certain timber, Burundi's key ports have served as export hubs for illegally harvested timber, specifically for illegal timber from the DRC. The extent of the issue of illegal logging is likely underestimated, as governments and researchers attempt to better account for the flow of illegal timber through international trade networks.

== Economy ==
Historical development of GDP per capita

Burundi is a landlocked, resource-poor country with an underdeveloped manufacturing sector. The economy of Burundi is predominantly agricultural, accounting for 50% of GDP in 2017, and employing more than 90% of the population. Subsistence agriculture accounts for 90% of agriculture. Primary exports are coffee and tea, which account for 90% of foreign exchange earnings, though exports are a relatively small share of GDP. Other agricultural products include cotton, maize, sorghum, sweet potatoes, bananas, manioc (tapioca); beef, milk and hides. Even though subsistence farming is highly relied upon, many people do not have the resources to sustain themselves. This is due to large population growth and no coherent policies governing land ownership. In 2014, the average farm size was about 0.40 hectares (1 acre).

Burundi is one of the world's poorest countries, owing in part to its landlocked geography, lack of access to education and the proliferation of HIV/AIDS. Approximately 80% of Burundi's population lives in poverty. Famines and food shortages have occurred throughout the 20th century, and according to the World Food Programme, 56.8% of children under age five suffer from chronic malnutrition. Burundi's export earnings – and its ability to pay for imports – rests primarily on weather conditions and international coffee and tea prices.

The purchasing power of most Burundians has decreased as wage increases have not kept up with inflation. As a result of deepening poverty, Burundi remains heavily dependent on aid from bilateral and multilateral donors. Foreign aid represents 42% of Burundi's national income, the second highest rate in sub-Saharan Africa. Burundi joined the East African Community in 2009, which should boost its regional trade ties, and also in 2009 received US$700 million in debt relief. Government corruption is hindering the development of a healthy private sector as companies seek to navigate an environment with ever-changing rules.

Studies since 2007 have shown Burundians to have extremely poor levels of satisfaction with life; the World Happiness Report 2018 rated them the world's least happy.

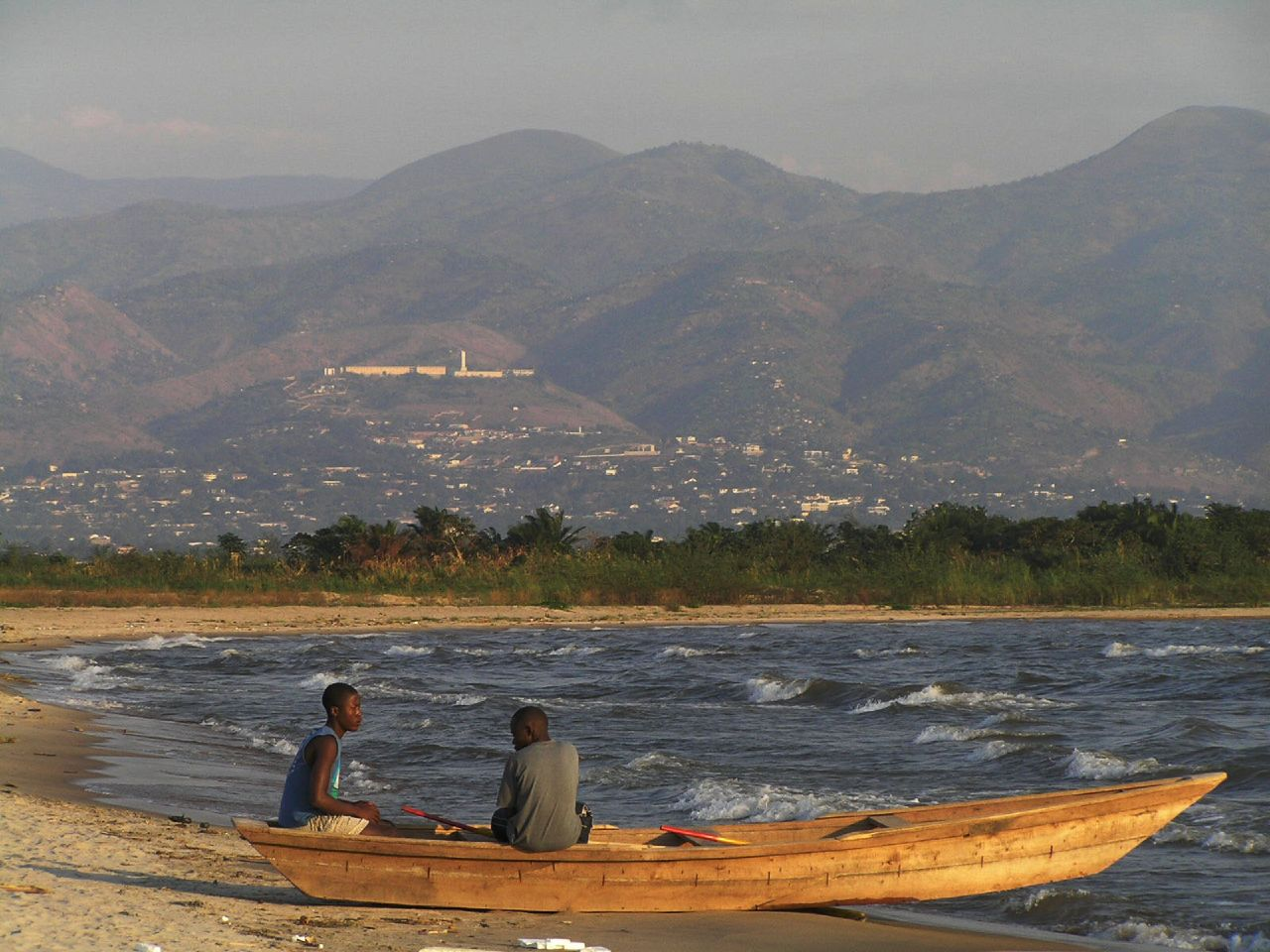
Fishermen on Lake Tanganyika

Some of Burundi's natural resources include uranium, nickel, cobalt, copper and platinum. Besides agriculture, other industries include: the assembly of imported components; public works construction; food processing, and light consumer goods such as blankets, shoes, and soap.

In regards to telecommunications infrastructure, Burundi is ranked last in the World Economic Forum's Networked Readiness Index (NRI) – an indicator for determining the development level of a country's information and communication technologies. Lack of access to financial services is a serious problem for the majority of the population, particularly in densely populated rural areas: only 2% of the population holds bank accounts, and fewer than 0.5% use bank lending services. Microfinance, however, plays a larger role, with 4% of Burundians being members of microfinance institutions – a larger share of the population than that reached by banking and postal services combined. 26 licensed microfinance institutions offer savings, deposits, and short- to medium-term credit. The dependence of the sector on donor assistance is limited.

Burundi is part of the East African Community and a potential member of the planned East African Federation. Burundi economy has declined since 1990s, and Burundi is behind all neighbouring countries.

=== Currency ===
Burundi's currency is the Burundian franc. It is nominally subdivided into 100 centimes, though coins have never been issued in centimes in independent Burundi; centime coins were circulated only when Burundi used the Belgian Congo franc. Monetary policy is controlled by the central bank, Bank of the Republic of Burundi.

=== Transport ===
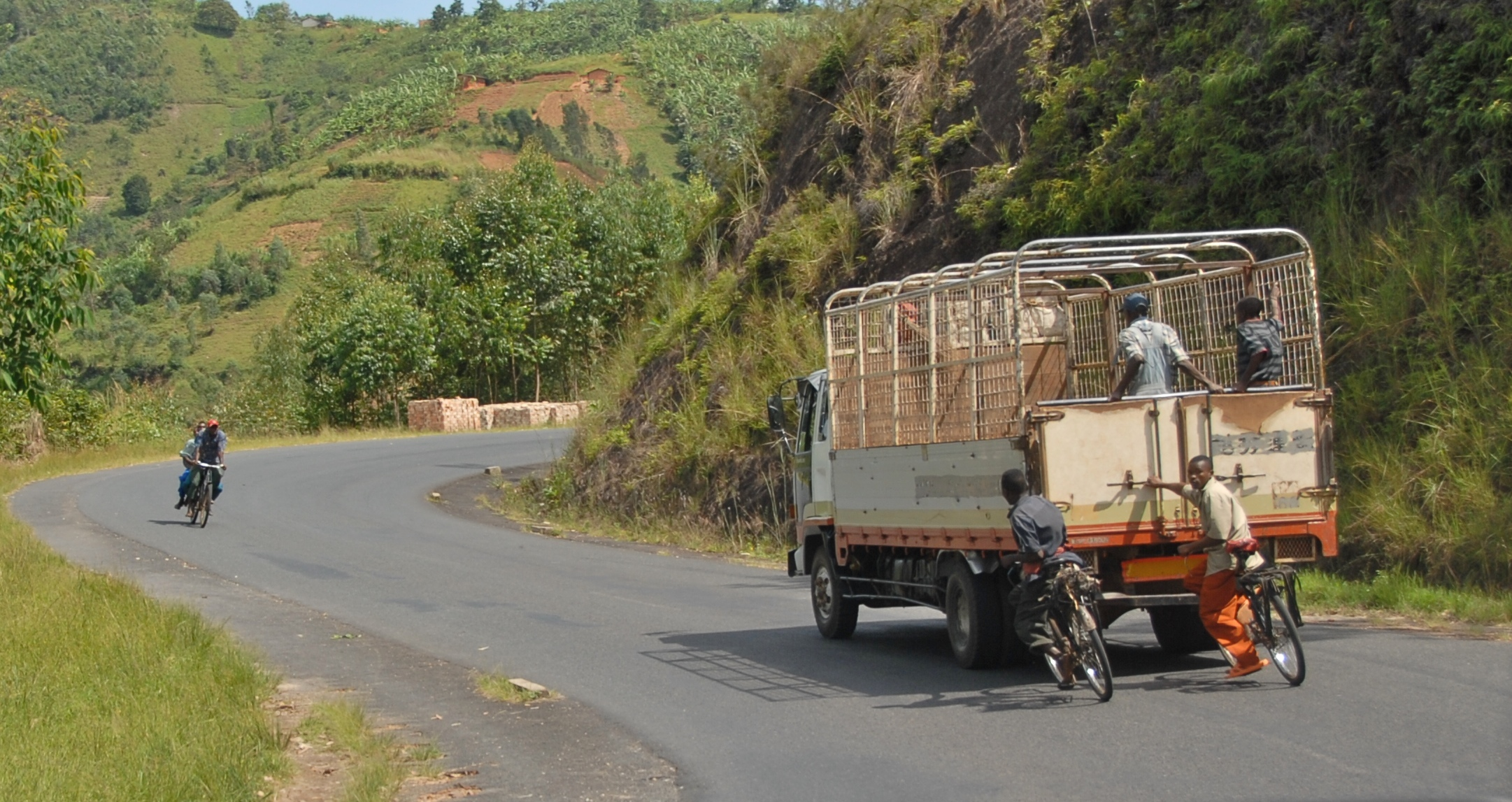
Bicycles are a popular means of transport in Burundi.

Burundi's transport network is limited and underdeveloped. According to a 2012 DHL Global Connectedness Index, Burundi is the least globalised of 140 surveyed countries. Bujumbura International Airport is the only airport with a paved runway and is serviced by four airlines (Brussels Airlines, Ethiopian Airlines, Kenya Airways, and RwandAir). Kigali is the city with the most daily flight connections to Bujumbura.

As of 2005 less than 10% of the roads were paved, and as of 2012 private bus companies were the main operators of buses on the international route to Kigali; however, there were no bus connections to the other neighbouring countries (Tanzania and the Democratic Republic of Congo). Bujumbura is connected by a passenger and cargo ferry (the MV Mwongozo) to Kigoma in Tanzania. There is a long-term plan to link the country via rail to Kigali and then onward to Kampala and Kenya.

== Demographics ==
Largest cities or towns in Burundi Source:
Rank	Name	Province	Pop.
1	Bujumbura	Bujumbura Mairie	374,809
2	Gitega	Gitega	135,467
3	Ngozi	Ngozi	39,884
4	Rumonge	Bururi	35,931
5	Cibitoke	Cibitoke	23,885
6	Kayanza	Kayanza	21,767
7	Bubanza	Bubanza	20,031
8	Karuzi	Karuzi	10,705
9	Kirundo	Kirundo	10,024
10	Muyinga	Muyinga	9,609

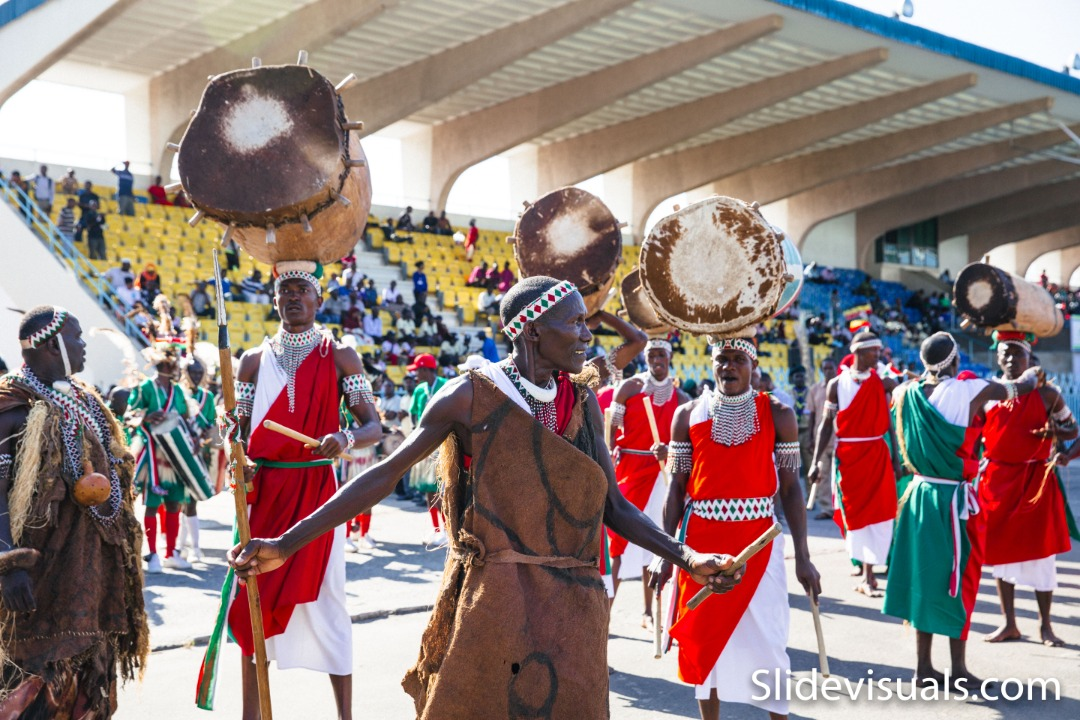
Burundian drummers wearing the traditional attire with drums

As of October 2021, Burundi was estimated by the United Nations to have a population of 12,346,893, compared to 2,456,000 in 1950. The population growth rate is 2.5 percent per year, more than double the average global pace, and a Burundian woman has on average 5.0 children, more than double the international fertility rate. Burundi had the tenth highest total fertility rate in the world in 2021. Many Burundians have migrated to other countries as a result of the civil war. In 2006, the United States accepted approximately 10,000 Burundian refugees.

Burundi remains an overwhelmingly rural society, with just 13% of the population living in urban areas in 2013. The population density of around 315 people per square kilometre (753 per sq mi) is the second highest in Sub-Saharan Africa. Roughly 85% of the population are of Hutu ethnic origin, 15% are Tutsi and fewer than 1% are indigenous Twa. Non-Africans include approximately 3,000 Europeans and 2,000 South Asians.

=== Languages ===
The official languages of Burundi are Kirundi, French, and English. English was made an official language in 2014. Virtually the entire population speaks Kirundi, and just under 10% speak French.

=== Religion ===
Sources estimate the Christian population at 80–90%, with Roman Catholics representing the largest group at 60–65%. Protestant and Anglican practitioners constitute the remaining 15–25%. An estimated 5% of the population adheres to traditional indigenous religious beliefs. Muslims constitute 2–5%, the majority of whom are Sunnis and live in urban areas.

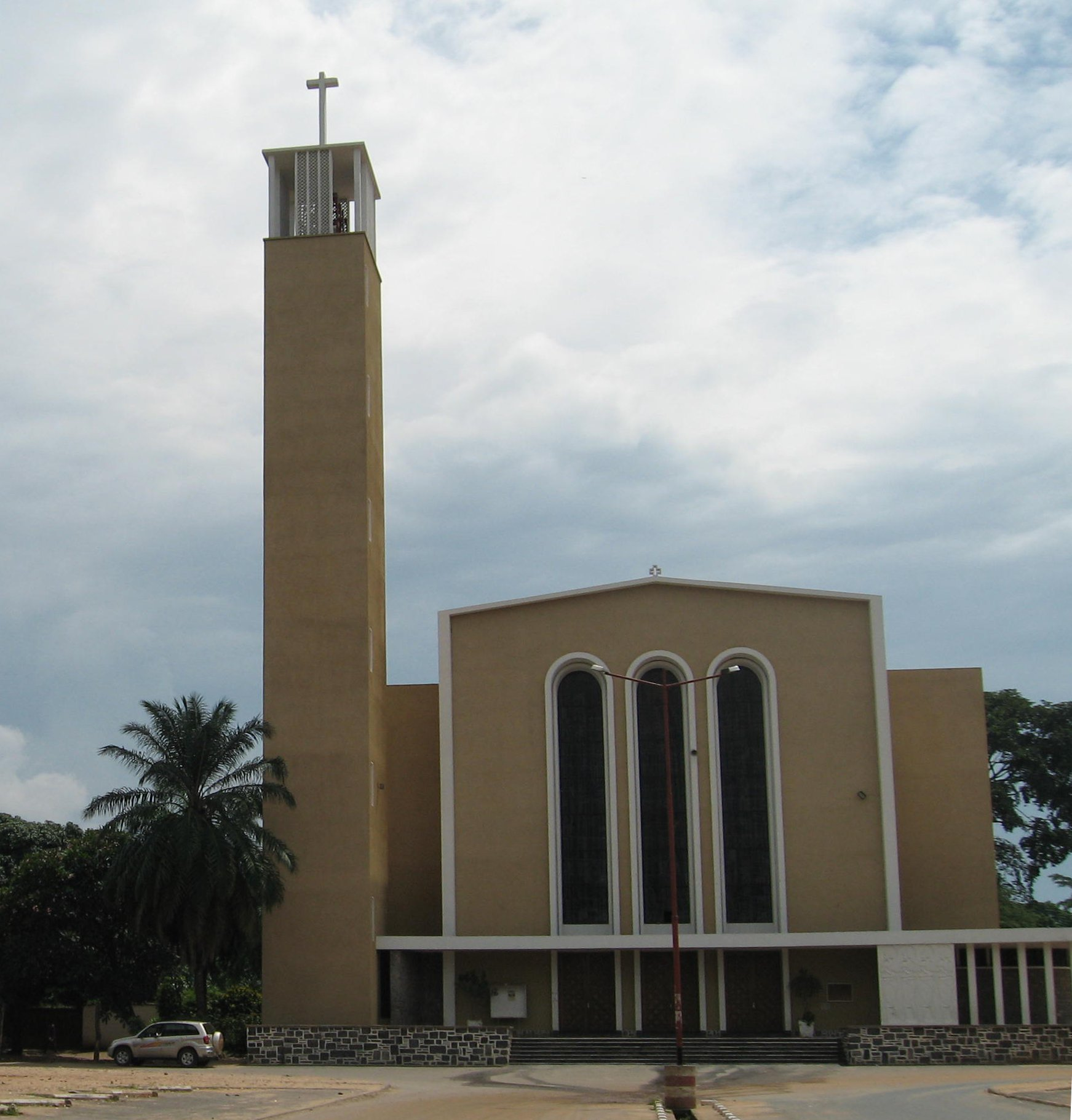
Cathedral Regina Mundi in Bujumbura.

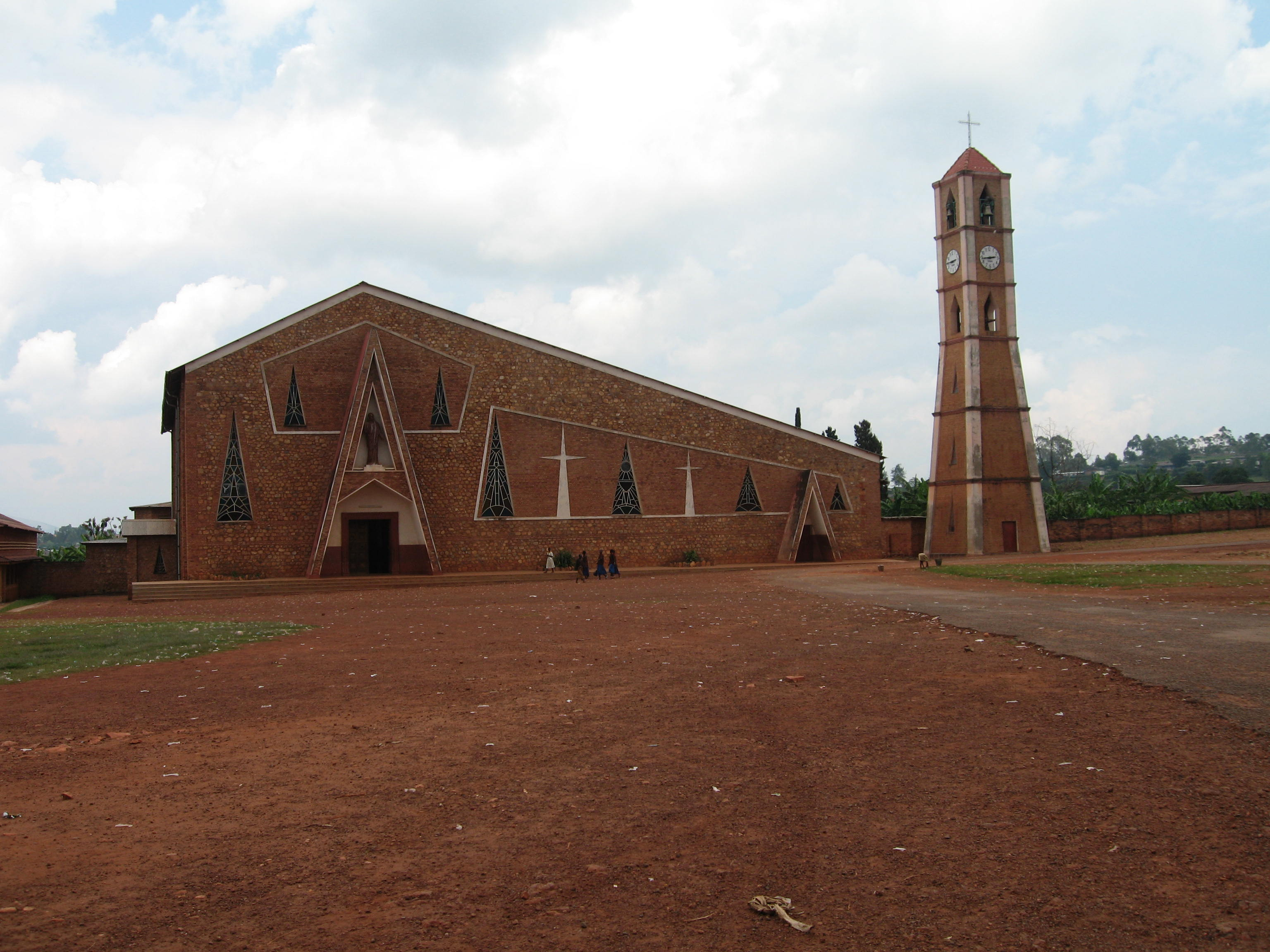
Gitega Church.

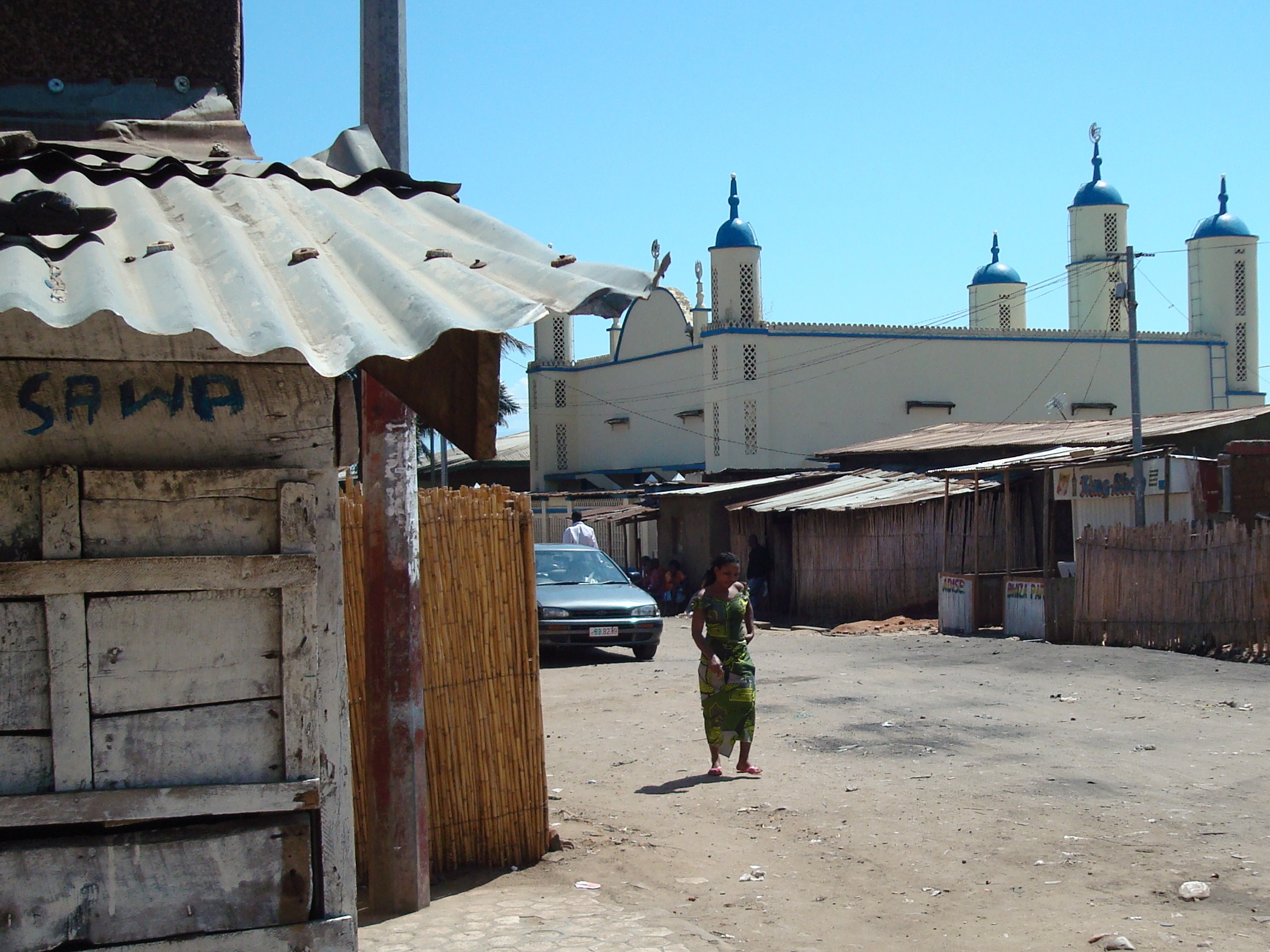
Bujumbura Mosque

=== Health ===
Burundi has the worst hunger and malnourishment rates of all 120 countries ranked in the Global Hunger Index. The civil war in 1962 put a stop on the medical advancements in the country. Burundi again went into a violent cycle in 2015, jeopardising the citizens' medical care.

Like other countries in Sub-Saharan Africa, Burundi uses indigenous medicine in addition to biomedicine. In the 1980s, Burundi's health authorities asked the United Nations Development Program for support to develop quality control for and begin new research on pharmaceuticals from medicinal plants. At the same time, the Burundi Association of Traditional Practitioners was founded, which teamed up with the governments agency to set up the Centre for Research and Promotion of Traditional Medicine in Burundi. The recent influx of international aid has supported the work of biomedical health systems. However, international aid workers have traditionally stayed away from indigenous medicine.

Common diseases include malaria and typhoid fever. Violence has limited the country's access to medication and hospital equipment. As of 2015, roughly 1 out of 10 children die before age 5 from preventable and treatable illnesses such as pneumonia, diarrhoea, and malaria. While the fertility rate is high, the infant death rate is 61.9 deaths for every 1,000 live births. The life expectancy as of 2015 was 60.1 years. In 2013, Burundi spent 8% of their GDP on healthcare.

== Culture ==
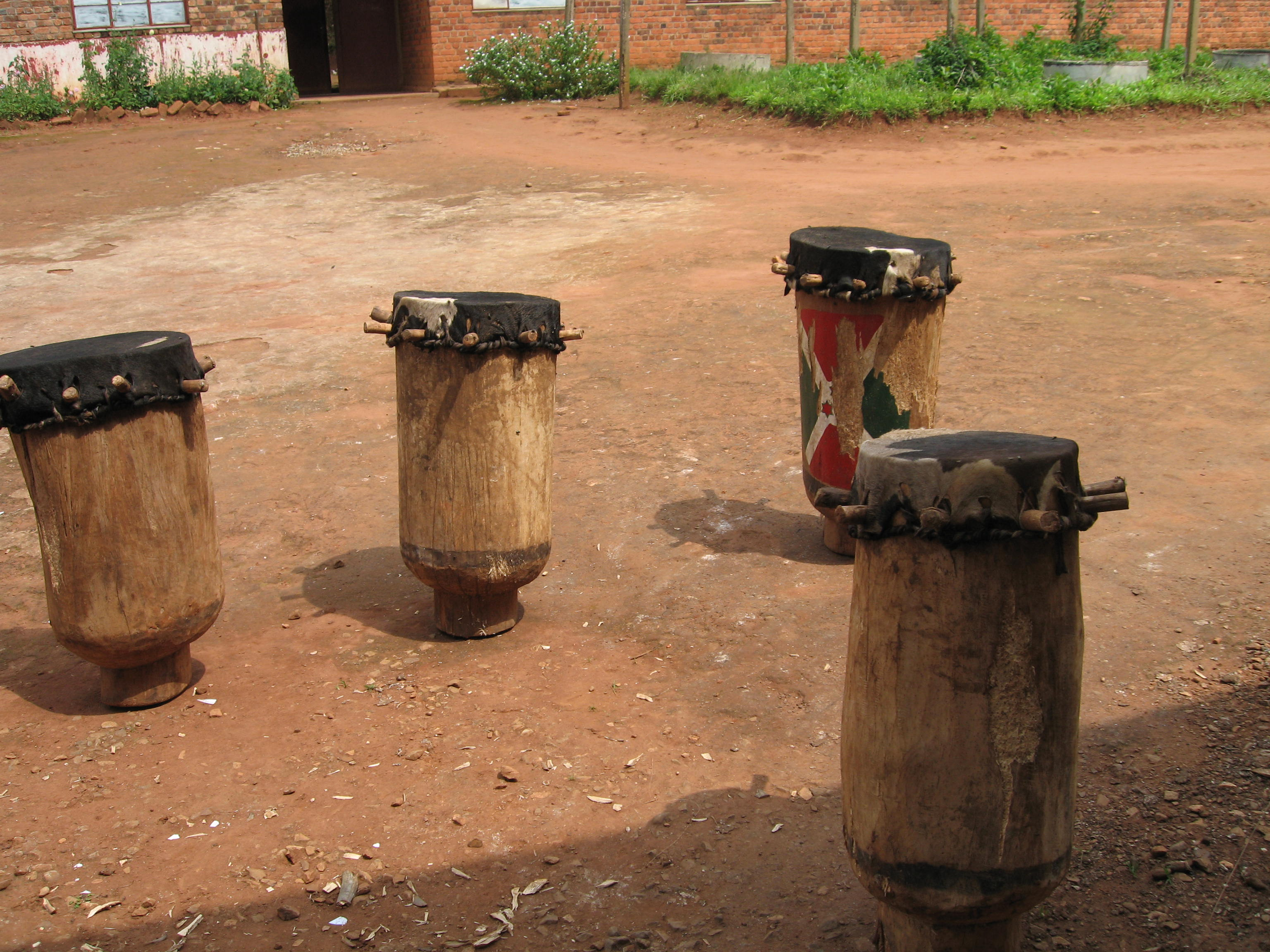
Drums from Gitega

Burundi's culture is based on local tradition and the influence of neighbouring countries, though cultural prominence has been hindered by civil unrest. Since farming is the main industry, a typical Burundian meal consists of sweet potatoes, maize, rice and peas. Due to the expense, meat is eaten only a few times per month.

When several Burundians of close acquaintance meet for a gathering they drink impeke, a beer, together from a large container to symbolise unity. Another traditional alcoholic beverage widely consumed is isongo and urwarwa, both types of banana wine.

Some notable Burundians in sports, culture and politics including:

- Footballer Mohamed Tchité
- Footballer Saido Berahino
- Footballer Marco Weymans
- Dungannon Swifts F.C. midfielder Gaël Bigirimana
- OGC Nice defensive midfielder Youssouf Ndayishimiye
- Vital'O FC winger Saidi Ntibazonkiza
- Olympic gold medalist Venuste Niyongabo
- Olympic and world silver medalist Francine Niyonsaba
- Professor of Economics Léonce Ndikumana
- Philanthropist Deogratias Niyizonkiza
- Writer and model Esther Kamatari
- Humanitarian Marguerite Barankitse
- Singer Jean-Pierre Nimbona, popularly known as Kidumu
- Singer Jeanine Rema popularly known as Khadja Nin
- Burundian-born American actor Celeste O'Connor
- Tennis player Sada Nahimana
- Runner Francine Niyonsaba
- Runner Francine Niyonizigiye
- Former Prime Minister Sylvie Kinigi
- Lydia Nsekera, Minister of Sports and Culture and member of IOC and FIFA

Crafts are an important art form in Burundi and are attractive gifts to many tourists. Basket weaving of inkoko and ibiseke is a popular craft for local artisans, as well as other crafts such as masks, shields, statues and pottery.

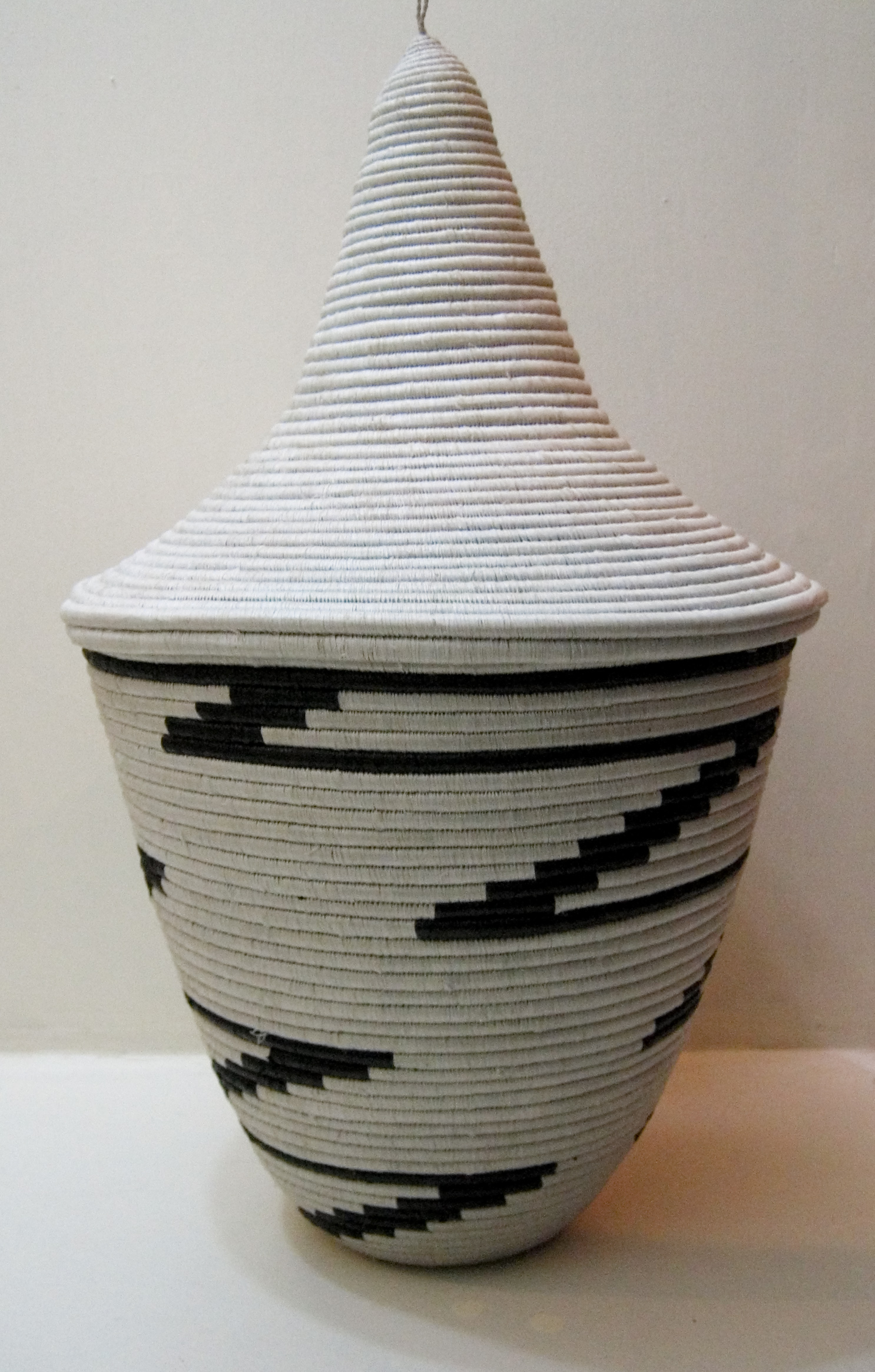
Igiseke, traditional woven basket

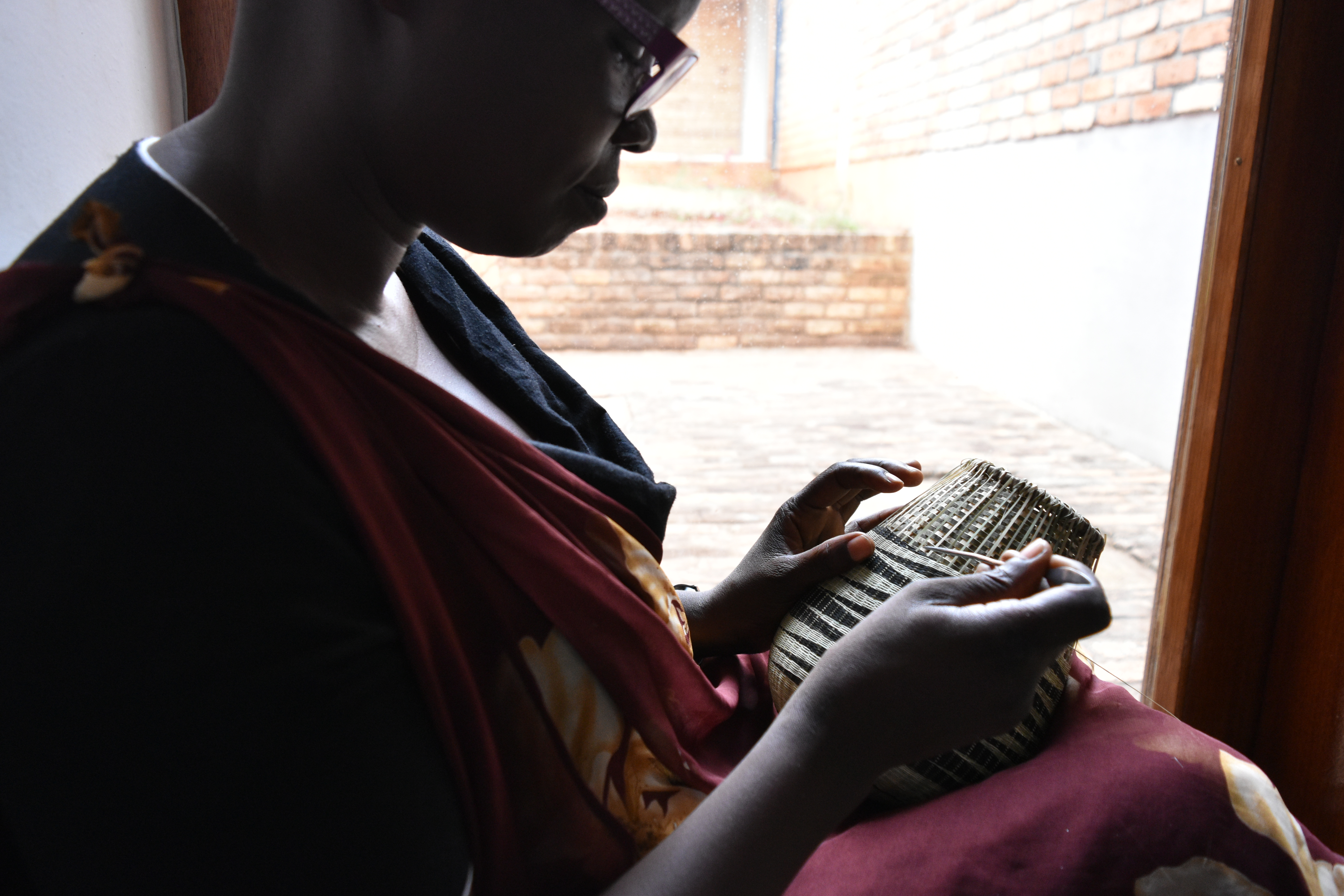
Traditional basket weaving

Drumming is an important part of the cultural heritage. The world-famous Royal Drummers of Burundi, who have performed for over 40 years, are noted for traditional drumming using the karyenda, amashako, ibishikiso and ikiranya drums. Dance often accompanies drumming performance, which is frequently seen in celebrations and family gatherings. The abatimbo, which is performed at official ceremonies and rituals and the fast-paced abanyagasimbo are some famous Burundian dances. Some musical instruments of note are the umwironge (flute), inanga(zither), ikembe, indonongo, umuduri, inanga, amayugi and the inyagara.

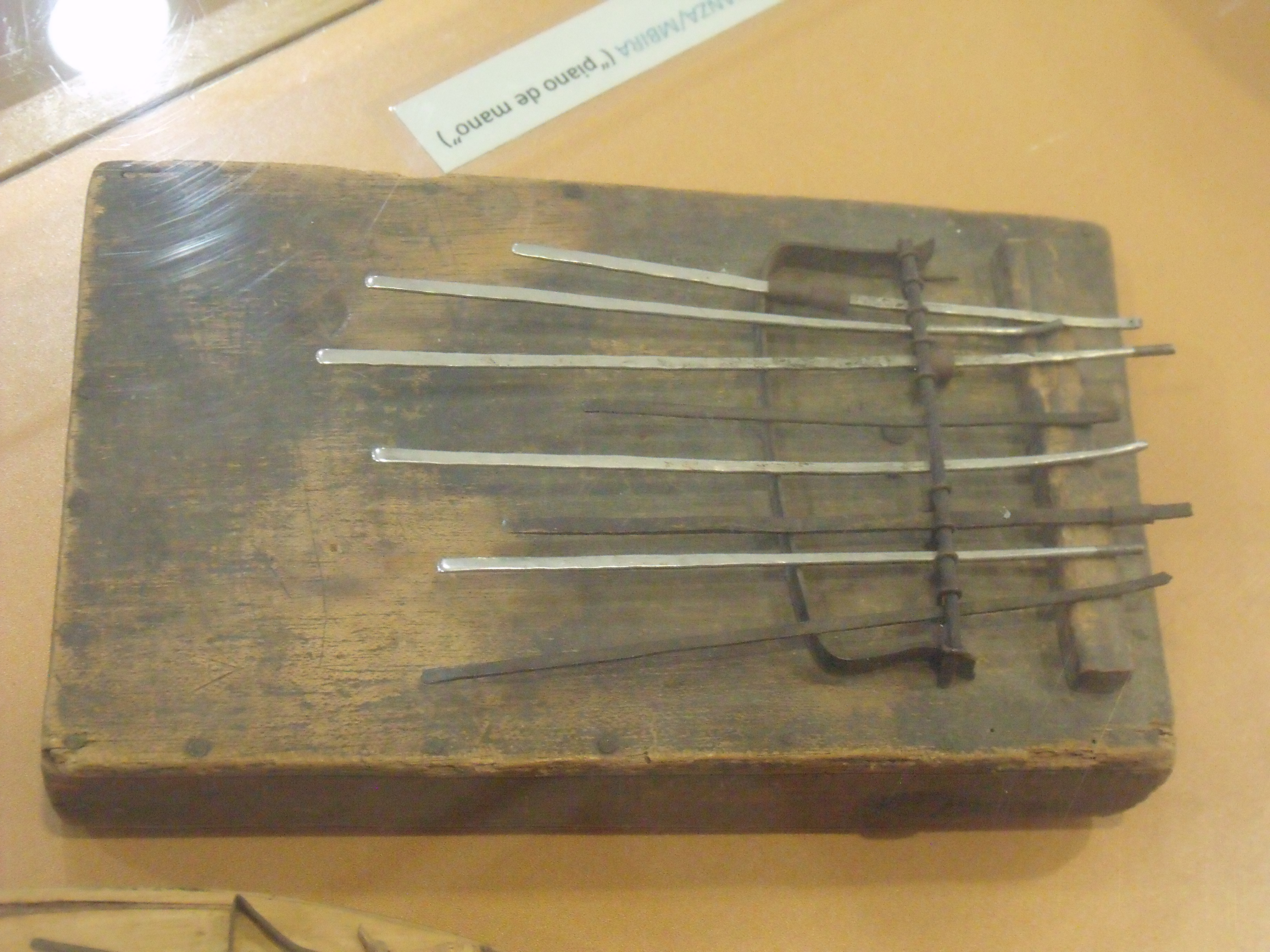
Ikembe

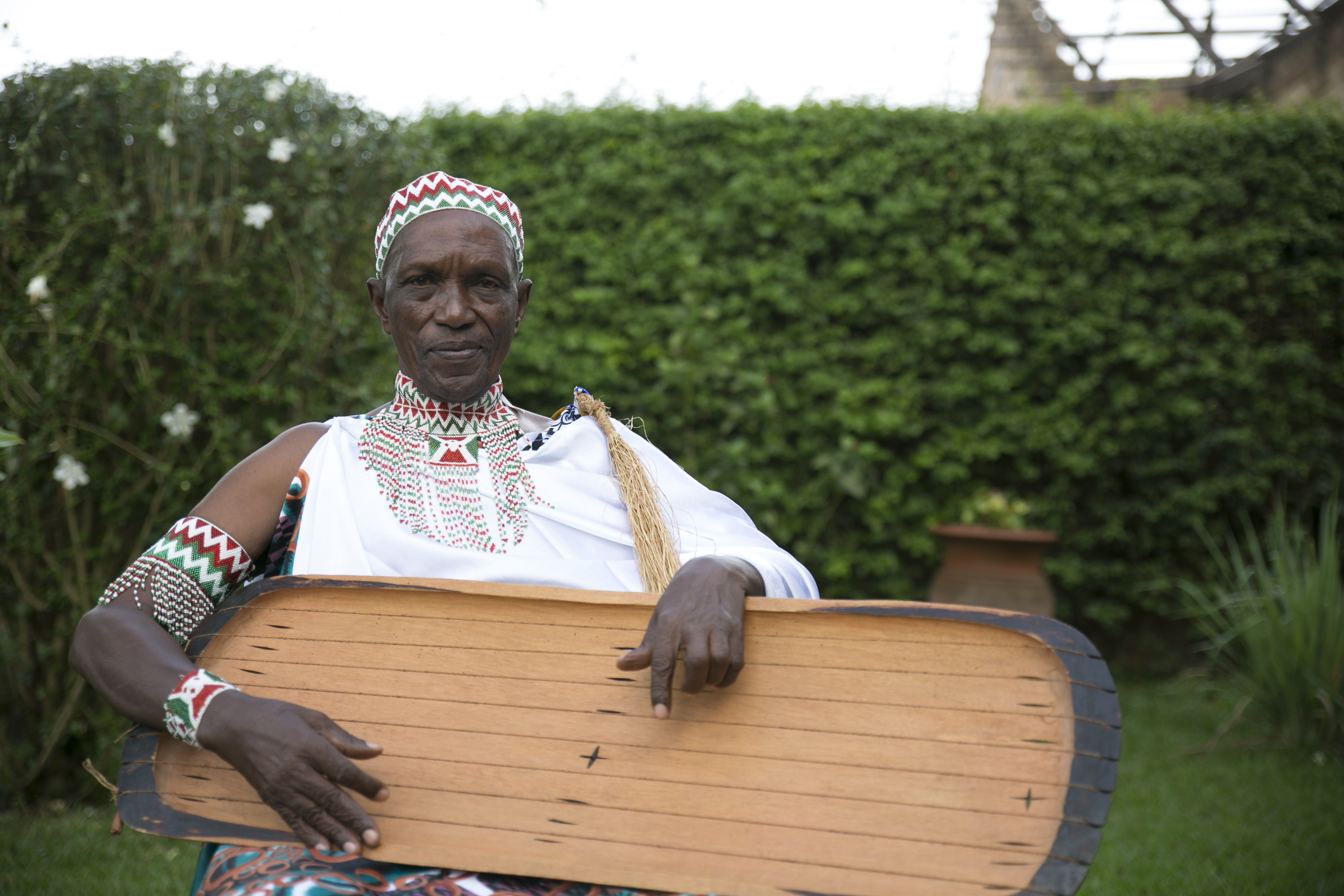
Inanga player Torobeka Joseph

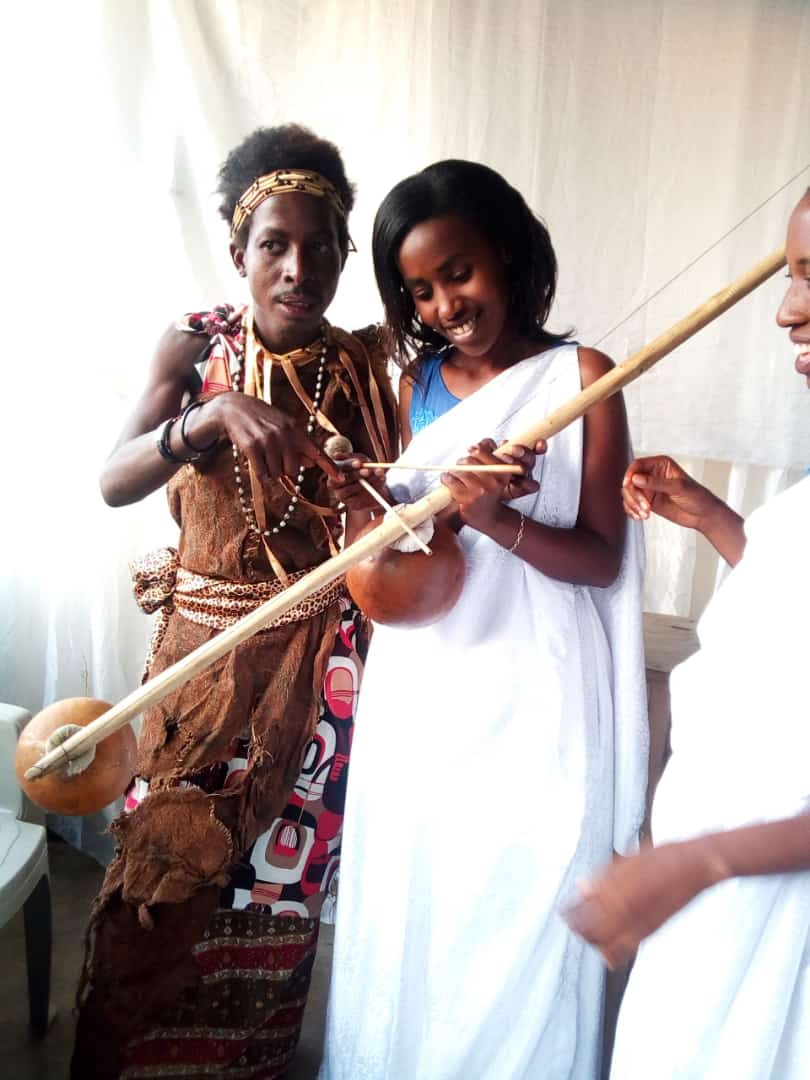
Playing Umuduri

Oral tradition is strong, relaying history and life lessons through storytelling, poetry and song. Imigani, indirimbo, amazina and ivyivugo are literary genres in Burundi.

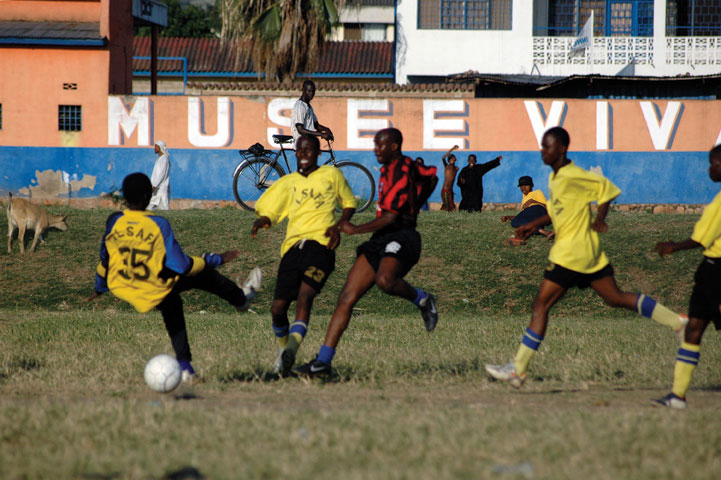
Football in Burundi

Basketball and track and field are noted sports. Martial arts are popular as well. There are five major judo clubs: Club Judo de l'Entente Sportive, in Downtown, and four others throughout the city. Association football is a popular pastime throughout the country, as are Ikibugu (mancala) games, a type of the bao game traditionally played all over East Africa.

Most Christian holidays are celebrated, with Christmas being the largest. Burundian Independence Day is celebrated annually on 1 July. In 2005, the Burundian government declared Eid al-Fitr, an Islamic holiday, to be a public holiday.

=== Education ===
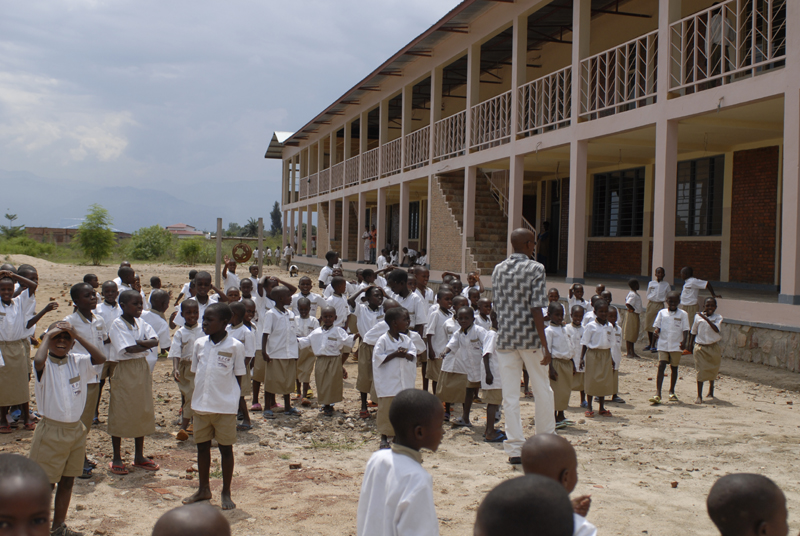
Carolus Magnus School

As of 2022, Burundi invested the equivalent of 5% of its GDP in education. In 2012, the adult literacy rate was estimated to be 75% for men and women between the ages of 15 and 24, while the youth literacy rate was much higher at 93%. Burundi has a comparatively high literacy rate to other countries in the region, which is only about 10% lower than the global average. Ten percent of Burundian boys are allowed a secondary education.

Burundi has one public university, University of Burundi. There are museums in the cities, such as the Burundi Geological Museum in Bujumbura, and the Burundi National Museum and the Burundi Museum of Life in Gitega.

In 2010 a new elementary school was opened in the small village of Rwoga that is funded by the pupils of Westwood High School, Quebec, Canada.

=== Science and technology ===
A 2013 government planning document identified training researchers as an area of policy importance. Researcher density grew from 40 to 55 researchers per million inhabitants between 2011 and 2018. Still, with six scientific publications per million inhabitants, Burundi has one of the lowest publication rates in Central and East Africa. Some 97.5% of publications involved foreign co-authorship between 2017 and 2019, with Ugandans figuring among the top five partners. The amount of funding available to each researcher more than doubled from PPP$14,310 (2005 currency value) to PPP$22,480, since the domestic research effort has also risen since 2012, from 0.11% to 0.21% of GDP. Between 2011 and 2019, Burundi scientists produced several articles on HIV, tropical communicable diseases, and tuberculosis in country, aligned with the country's sustainable development goals. With regard to material sciences, Burundi's publication intensity doubled from 0.6 to 1.2 articles per million inhabitants between 2012 and 2019, placing it in the top 15 for sub-Saharan Africa for this strategic technology. Medical sciences remain the main focus of research: medical researchers accounted for 4% of the country's scientists in 2018 but 41% of scientific publications between 2011 and 2019.

Burundi ranked 181 of 195 countries on the Global Health Security Index in 2021. This ranking sheds light on the low number of research staff and small laboratory network that the country currently has. The country also lacks lab capacity for testing of five critical diseases, as outlined by the WHO. Despite being low on the index, Burundi is home to a research university, the National Veterinary Laboratory, and an Institute on Nutritional Sciences.

== See also ==
- Outline of Burundi
- Mass media in Burundi
- Wildlife of Burundi
- National Defence Force (Burundi)

== Bibliography ==
- Eggers, Ellen K. (2006). Historical Dictionary of Burundi (3rd ed.). Lanham, Maryland: Scarecrow Press. ISBN 0-8108-5302-7.
- Howard, Lise Morjé (2007). UN Peacekeeping in Civil Wars. doi:10.1017/CBO9780511840593. ISBN 978-0-521-88138-8.
- Lemarchand, Rene (1996). Burundi: Ethnic Conflict and Genocide. Cambridge University Press. ISBN 978-0-521-56623-0.
