= Jean-Claude Kavumbagu =

Burundian Internet journalist

- Occupation: journalist
- Known for: dissident reporting

Jean-Claude Kavumbagu is a Burundian Internet journalist who has been arrested on multiple occasions for issues related to his reporting. In 2011, he was charged with treason in a high-profile trial and named a prisoner of conscience by Amnesty International.

== Olympics scandal and arrest ==
Kavumbagu is director of the Burundian Internet news agency Net Press. On 11 September 2008, he was arrested following the publication of an article in which he alleged that the cost of President Pierre Nkurunziza's trip to see the Beijing Olympics (an estimated 100 million Burundian francs) caused some civil servants’ salaries to be paid late. Following a government statement that the trip had only cost half of the alleged amount, Kavumbagu was charged with "libelous writing and insulting remarks." Amnesty International, the Committee to Protect Journalists, and International PEN protested his arrest and called for his immediate release. Kavumbagu was cleared by a court in March 2009 and released from prison. However, the prosecutor appealed the case, and as of July 2010, it remains open.

== Bombing response and second trial ==
On 11 July 2010, Kampala, Uganda was attacked by suicide bombers from Al-Shabaab, a Somali Islamist militia, killing 74 and injuring 70. The following day, Kavumbagu published a blog post on his site which criticized the ability of Burundian forces to defend the country in the face of a similar attack: “The anxiety has been palpable in Bujumbura and all those who have heard about [the bombings] yesterday in Kampala were convinced that if the al-Shabaab militants wanted to try ‘something' in our country, they would succeed with disconcerting ease, [as] our defense and security forces shine in their capacity to pillage and kill their compatriots rather than defend our country." On 17 July, he was arrested, charged with treason, questioned without the presence of a lawyer, and imprisoned in Mpimba Central Prison, Bujumbura. In Burundi, treason carries a maximum sentence of life imprisonment. His arrest was again denounced by a number of international human rights organizations, including Amnesty International, Human Rights Watch, and Front Line. A number of journalism and press freedom organizations have called for the charges against Kavumbagu to be dropped, including the Committee to Protect Journalists, the International Federation of Journalists, International PEN, the Federation of African Journalists, the Eastern Africa Journalists Association, and Reporters Without Borders.

In November 2010, Kavumbagu was denied a request for bail, and was housed with violent offenders. On 13 April 2011, the trial's prosecutor announced his intention to seek a life sentence. On 3 May, World Press Freedom Day, around 100 Burundian journalists marched into Bujumbura to demonstrate support for Kavumbagu.

On 13 May, Kavumbagu was acquitted of treason, but found guilty on the charge of publishing an article "likely to discredit the state or economy". He was sentenced to eight months' imprisonment and released for time served. Human Rights Watch and the Committee to Protect Journalists protested the verdict, the latter reiterating its belief that "Burundi should decriminalize press offenses and allow journalists to speak and write freely without fear of harassment or arrest".
