= Foreign relations of Burundi =

Burundi's relations with its neighbours have often been affected by security concerns. During the Burundian Civil War, hundreds of thousands of Burundian refugees have at various times crossed to neighboring Rwanda, Tanzania, and the Democratic Republic of the Congo. Some Burundian rebel groups have used neighboring countries as bases for insurgent activities. The 1993 embargo placed on Burundi by regional states hurt diplomatic relations with its neighbors; relations have improved since the 1999 suspension of these sanctions.

Burundi is a member of various international and regional organizations, including the United Nations, the African Union, the African Development Bank and the Francophonie. The Swedish Minister for Integration and Gender Equality, Nyamko Sabuni, was born in Burundi.

== Diplomatic relations ==
List of countries which Burundi maintains diplomatic relations with:

#	Country	Date
1	France	1 July 1962
2	Japan	1 July 1962
3	United Kingdom	1 July 1962
4	United States	1 July 1962
5	Netherlands	4 July 1962
6	Belgium	18 July 1962
7	Poland	8 August 1962
8	Russia	1 October 1962
9	Israel	22 December 1962
10	Germany	24 January 1963
—	Holy See	11 February 1963
11	Czech Republic	11 March 1963
12	China	21 December 1963
13	Democratic Republic of the Congo	1963
14	Switzerland	13 January 1964
15	Ghana	25 August 1964
16	Mali	4 November 1964
17	Egypt	8 December 1964
18	Bulgaria	28 December 1964
19	Luxembourg	29 April 1965
20	Ethiopia	9 June 1965
21	Denmark	25 June 1965
22	Kenya	12 June 1965
23	Tanzania	9 September 1965
24	Sweden	7 December 1965
25	Spain	27 September 1966
26	Norway	1966
27	North Korea	12 March 1967
28	Guinea	28 June 1967
29	Uganda	25 August 1967
30	India	1967
31	Italy	1967
32	Hungary	29 May 1968
33	Serbia	1 August 1968
34	Romania	8 August 1968
35	Greece	1968
36	Senegal	January 1969
37	Canada	27 March 1969
38	Rwanda	April 1969
39	Austria	1969
40	Nigeria	6 November 1970
41	Somalia	1970
42	Sudan	1970
43	Algeria	April 1972
44	Syria	April 1972
45	Chad	6 December 1972
46	Zambia	13 March 1973
47	Vietnam	16 April 1973
48	Libya	19 April 1973
49	Albania	7 November 1973
50	Cuba	2 February 1974
51	United Arab Emirates	February 1974
52	Saudi Arabia	15 July 1974
53	Qatar	26 October 1974
54	Bahrain	11 November 1974
55	Portugal	22 February 1975
56	Oman	28 February 1975
57	Mozambique	26 June 1975
58	Argentina	20 September 1976
59	Gabon	23 October 1976
60	Mexico	28 July 1977
61	Finland	1 January 1980
62	Tunisia	1 March 1980
63	Brazil	4 March 1980
64	Turkey	30 April 1980
65	Cameroon	1 August 1980
66	Iraq	27 September 1980
67	Republic of the Congo	21 December 1980
68	Kuwait	16 January 1981
69	Bangladesh	23 May 1983
70	Djibouti	13 December 1984
71	Iran	31 March 1985
72	Zimbabwe	26 April 1985
73	Indonesia	31 May 1988
74	Thailand	20 July 1988
75	Colombia	11 November 1988
76	Angola	21 December 1988
77	Morocco	13 September 1991
78	South Korea	3 October 1991
79	Armenia	28 May 1992
80	Moldova	12 June 1992
81	Belarus	24 July 1992
82	Estonia	30 July 1992
83	Ukraine	22 February 1993
84	Lithuania	17 May 1993
85	Georgia	21 May 1993
86	Latvia	24 May 1993
87	Cambodia	25 May 1994
88	Azerbaijan	2 March 1995
89	South Africa	23 June 1995
90	Cyprus	3 October 1995
91	Malaysia	1996
92	Slovakia	29 June 1999
93	North Macedonia	7 February 2000
94	Seychelles	15 July 2002
95	Ireland	April 2004
96	Pakistan	9 March 2005
97	Iceland	14 December 2006
98	Botswana	13 March 2007
99	Andorra	30 May 2007
100	Slovenia	27 July 2007
101	Australia	23 August 2007
102	Costa Rica	28 September 2007
103	Venezuela	30 October 2007
104	Bosnia and Herzegovina	9 September 2009
105	Ivory Coast	8 April 2010
106	Namibia	23 April 2010
107	Paraguay	2010
108	Equatorial Guinea	23 May 2012
109	Montenegro	17 August 2012
110	Solomon Islands	13 September 2012
111	South Sudan	28 November 2012
112	Mongolia	8 July 2013
113	Benin	13 January 2014
114	New Zealand	16 May 2014
115	Monaco	31 October 2014
116	Kazakhstan	4 December 2014
117	Malta	12 January 2015
118	Ecuador	27 February 2015
119	Fiji	20 March 2015
120	Turkmenistan	12 December 2015
121	Sierra Leone	2 March 2016
122	Malawi	4 April 2016
123	Bolivia	17 November 2016
124	Philippines	30 June 2017
125	Kyrgyzstan	22 September 2017
126	Nepal	6 June 2018
127	Dominican Republic	26 September 2018
128	Tajikistan	18 October 2018
129	Sri Lanka	11 March 2019
130	Nicaragua	26 June 2019
131	Burkina Faso	28 October 2019
132	Vanuatu	6 December 2019
133	Liberia	22 January 2020
134	Croatia	14 May 2021
135	Gambia	15 October 2021
136	Saint Vincent and the Grenadines	24 November 2021
137	Maldives	20 January 2022
138	Laos	4 February 2022
139	Mauritania	26 July 2022
140	Eswatini	4 August 2022
141	Niger	25 April 2023
142	São Tomé and Príncipe	13 June 2023
143	Trinidad and Tobago	1 September 2023
144	El Salvador	18 September 2023
145	Singapore	6 October 2023
146	Belize	23 September 2024
147	Uzbekistan	24 September 2024
148	Madagascar	26 September 2024
149	San Marino	27 September 2024
—	Sovereign Military Order of Malta	25 October 2024
150	Jordan	20 February 2025
151	Central African Republic	17 March 2025
152	Suriname	17 April 2025
153	Cape Verde	19 June 2025
154	Liechtenstein	12 August 2025
155	Guinea-Bissau	22 October 2025
156	Timor-Leste	19 January 2026
157	Comoros	4 February 2026
158	Uruguay	15 May 2026
159	Mauritius	26 August 2026

== Bilateral relations ==
=== Africa ===
Country	Formal Relations Began.	Notes
Algeria	April 1972	Both countries established diplomatic relations in April 1972: Algeria is represented in Burundi through its embassy in Bujumbura.; Burundi has an embassy in Algiers.
Angola	21 December 1988	Both countries established diplomatic relations on 21 December 1988 when Angola's first Ambassador to Burundi, Miguel Gaspar Neto presented his credentials.: Angola is represented in Burundi through its embassy in Tanzania.
Cameroon	1 August 1980	Both countries established diplomatic relations on 1 August 1980: Both countries are members of the Economic Community of Central African States.
Central African Republic		The two countries maintain diplomatic relations and Burundian President Pierre Nkurunziza visited the country in 2014.
Democratic Republic of the Congo	1963	Both countries established diplomatic relations in 1963: Burundi has an embassy in Kinshasa.; DR Congo has an embassy in Bujumbura.
Republic of Congo	21 December 1980	Both countries established diplomatic relations on 21 December 1980: Congo is represented in Burundi through its embassy in Rwanda.
Egypt	8 December 1964	Both countries established diplomatic relations on 8 December 1964: Burundi has an embassy in Cairo.; Egypt has an embassy in Bujumbura.
Equatorial Guinea		Burundi is represented in Equatorial Guinea through its embassy in Nigeria.; Equatorial Guinea is represented in Burundi through its embassy in the Republic of Congo.
Ethiopia	9 June 1965	Both countries established diplomatic relations on 9 June 1965 when the Burundi government has appointed its Ambassador in Addis Ababa, Pascar Bugiriza: Burundi has an embassy in Addis Ababa.; The two countries maintain friendly and cooperative relations.
Ghana	25 August 1964	Both countries established diplomatic relations on 25 August 1964: Ghana is represented in Burundi through its embassy in Kenya.
Guinea	28 June 1967	Both countries established diplomatic relations on 28 June 1967: Guinea is represented in Burundi through its embassy in Gabon.
Kenya	1967	See Kenya–Burundi relations: Kenya has an embassy in Bujumbura.; Burundi has an embassy in Nairobi.
Libya	19 April 1973	Libya has an embassy in Bujumbura.
Malawi		Malawi is represented in Burundi through its embassy in Tanzania.
Morocco	13 September 1991	Both countries established diplomatic relations on 13 September 1991: Burundi has an embassy in Rabat.; Morocco has an embassy in Bujumbura.
Mozambique	26 June 1975	Mozambique is represented in Burundi through its embassy in Tanzania.
Nigeria	6 November 1970	Both countries established diplomatic relations on 6 November 1970 when M. Jimm Etuk, first Ambassador of Nigeria to Burundi, presented his letters of credentials to colonel Michel Micombero, Head of State.: Burundi has an embassy in Abuja.; Nigeria has an embassy in Bujumbura.
Rwanda	April 1969	Both countries established diplomatic relations in April 1969 Main article: Burundi–Rwanda relations: Rwanda has an embassy in Bujumbura.
Senegal	January 1969	Both countries established diplomatic relations in January 1969: Senegal is represented in Burundi through its embassy in Ethiopia.
Sierra Leone	2 March 2016	Both countries established diplomatic relations on 2 March 2016.: Sierra Leone is represented in Burundi through its embassy in Ethiopia.
Somalia	1970	The two countries maintain diplomatic relations and Somali President Mohamed Abdullahi Farmajo visited Burundi in 2019.; Somalia has an embassy in Bujumbura.
South Africa	23 June 1995	Both countries established diplomatic relations on 23 June 1995; Burundi has an embassy in Pretoria.; South Africa has an embassy in Bujumbura.; Both countries are full members of the African Union and of the African Economic Community.
South Sudan	28 November 2012	Both countries established diplomatic relations on 28 November 2012: South Sudan is represented in Burundi through its embassy in Uganda.
Sudan	1970	Both countries established diplomatic relations in 1970: Sudan is represented in Burundi through its embassy in Uganda.
Tanzania	9 September 1965	See Burundi–Tanzania relations: Burundi has an embassy in Dar es Salaam.; Tanzania has an embassy in Bujumbura.
Uganda	25 August 1967	Both countries established diplomatic relations on 25 August 1967 when has been accredited Ambassador of Burundi to Uganda (Resident in Dar es Salaam) Mr. P. Mangona.: Burundi has an embassy in Kampala.; Uganda has an embassy in Bujumbura.
Zambia	13 March 1973	Both countries established diplomatic relations on 13 March 1973: Burundi has an embassy in Lusaka.

=== Americas ===
Country	Formal Relations Began	Notes
Canada	27 March 1969	Both countries established diplomatic relations on 27 March 1969; Both countries are full members of the Organisation internationale de la Francophonie.; Burundi has an embassy in Ottawa.
Mexico	28 July 1977	Both countries established diplomatic relations on 28 July 1977: Burundi is accredited to Mexico from its embassy in Washington, D.C., United States.; Mexico is accredited to Burundi from its embassy in Nairobi, Kenya and maintains an honorary consulate Bujumbura.
United States	1 July 1962	See Burundi-United States relations: Burundi has an embassy in Washington, D.C.; United States has an embassy in Bujumbura.

=== Asia ===
Country	Formal Relations Began	Notes
China	21 December 1963	See Burundi–China relations On December 21, 1963, the People's Republic of China established the diplomatic relations with the Republic of Burundi. But on January 29, 1965, the Burundi government unilaterally announced the break-up of the diplomatic relations with China. On October 13, 1971, the two countries restored the diplomatic relations and afterwards it has witnessed a favorable development.: Burundi has an embassy in Beijing.; China has an embassy in Bujumbura.
India	1967	See Burundi–India relations: Burundi has an embassy in New Delhi.; India is accredited to Burundi from its high commission in Kampala, Uganda.; Both countries have a number of bilateral agreements.
Iraq	27 September 1980	Both countries established diplomatic relations on 27 September 1980 when Ambassador of Iraq Mr. Fakhri Ahmed Oasio presented his credentials to President of Burundi Colonel Jean-Baptiste Bagaza.
Israel	22 December 1962	Diplomatic relations were broken off 16 May 1973 and resumption on 1 March 1995: Burundi is represented in Israel through its embassy in Ethiopia.
Kuwait	16 January 1981	Both countries established diplomatic relations on 16 January 1981 when ambassador of Burundi Mr. Julian Nahabo presented his credentials to Amir of Kuwait Shaikh Jaber.
North Korea	12 March 1967	See Burundi–North Korea relations
South Korea	3 October 1991	Establishment of diplomatic Relations between South Korea and the Republic of Burundi was on 3 October 1991. In October 1985 Minister of Finance Pierre Ngerngi attended the Annual General Meeting of the IMF and the IBRD in Seoul, Korea.
Turkey	30 April 1980	Both countries established diplomatic relations on 30 April 1980: Burundi has an embassy in Ankara.; Turkey has an embassy in Bujumbura.; Trade volume between the two countries was US$3.1 million in 2019 (Burundi's exports/imports: 0.5/2.6 million USD).
Vietnam	16 April 1973	Both countries established diplomatic relations on April 16, 1973; Both countries are full members of the Organisation internationale de la Francophonie.

=== Europe ===
Country	Formal Relations Began	Notes
Belgium	18 July 1962	Both countries established diplomatic relations on 18 July 1962.: Belgium has an embassy in Bujumbura.; Burundi has an embassy in Brussels.
Cyprus	26 November 2001	Both countries established diplomatic relations on 26 November 2001: Burundi is represented in Cyprus by its embassy in Geneva, Switzerland and an honorary consulate in Nicosia.; Cyprus is represented in Burundi by its embassy in Doha, Qatar and an honorary consulate in Bujumbura.; Both countries are full members of the Organisation internationale de la Francophonie.
Denmark	25 June 1965	Denmark is represented in Burundi, through its embassy in Kampala.; Burundi is represented in Denmark, through its embassy in Berlin.
Germany	24 January 1963	Germany has an embassy in Bujumbura; Burundi has an embassy in Berlin
Greece	1968	Greece is represented in Burundi through its embassy in Uganda, while Uganda is represented in Greece through its embassy in Switzerland.
Italy	1967	Burundi and Italy maintain diplomatic relations and Italy is represented in Burundi through its embassy in Uganda.: Italy is represented in Burundi through its embassy in Kampala.; Burundi has an Embassy in Rome.
Netherlands	4 July 1962	The Netherlands have an embassy in Bujumbura.; Burundi has an embassy in The Hague
Poland	8 August 1962	See Burundi–Poland relations
Russia	1 October 1962	Both countries established diplomatic relations on 1 October 1962 See Burundi–Russia relations: Russia has an embassy in Bujumbura; Burundi has an embassy in Moscow
United Kingdom	1 July 1962	See Foreign relations of the United Kingdom Burundi established diplomatic relations with the United Kingdom on 1 July 1962.: Burundi maintains an embassy in London.; The United Kingdom is accredited to Burundi through its embassy office in Bujumbura.; Both countries share common membership of the World Trade Organization. Bilaterally the two countries have an Investment Agreement.

=== Pacific ===
Country	Formal Relations Began	Notes
Australia	23 August 2007	Australia is represented in Burundi by its embassy in Nairobi, Kenya.; Burundi is represented in Australia through its embassy in Beijing, China.

== See also ==
- List of diplomatic missions in Burundi
- List of diplomatic missions of Burundi
