= List of diplomatic missions of Burundi =

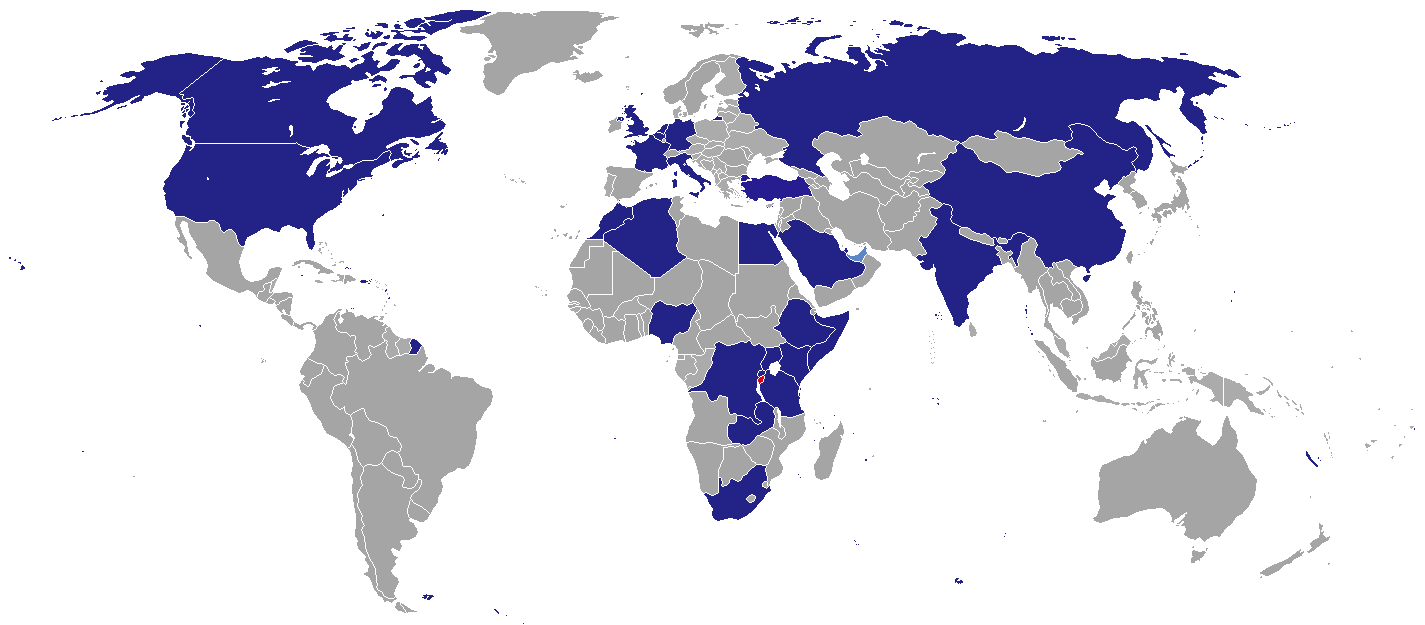
Location of diplomatic missions of Burundi: Burundi Consulate-General Embassy

This is a list of diplomatic missions of Burundi.

Trade missions and honorary consulates are omitted from this listing.

Currently, Burundi holds 28 embassies (12 in Africa, 8 in Europe, 6 in Asia and 2 in North America), 2 permanent missions to the UN (1 in Europe and 1 in North America), 4 consulates and 1 liaison office.

== Current missions ==
=== Africa ===
| Host country | Host city | Mission | Concurrent accreditation | Ref. |
|---|---|---|---|---|
| Algeria | Algiers | Embassy | | |
| DR Congo | Kinshasa | Embassy | Countries: Cameroon; Central African Republic; Congo-Brazzaville; Equatorial Guinea; Gabon; São Tomé and Príncipe; International Organizations: ECCAS | |
| DR Congo | Bukavu | Consulate-General | | |
| Egypt | Cairo | Embassy | Countries: Lebanon; Libya; Sudan; International Organizations: Arab Bank for Economic Development in Africa; Arab League | |
| Ethiopia | Addis Ababa | Embassy | Countries: Chad; Djibouti; Eritrea; Israel; South Sudan; Yemen; International Organizations: African Union; UNECA | |
| Kenya | Nairobi | Embassy | Countries: Somalia; International Organizations: UNEP; UN-Habitat; IGAD | |
| Morocco | Rabat | Embassy | Countries: Mauritania; Tunisia | |
| Morocco | Laayoune | Consulate-General | | |
| Nigeria | Abuja | Embassy | Countries: Benin; Burkina Faso; Ghana; Guinea; Guinea Bissau; Ivory Coast; Liberia; Mali; Niger; Senegal; Togo; International Organizations: African Development Bank; ECOWAS | |
| Rwanda | Kigali | Embassy | | |
| South Africa | Pretoria | Embassy | Countries: Botswana; Eswatini; Namibia; Seychelles; Mozambique; Zimbabwe | |
| Tanzania | Dar es Salaam | Embassy | Countries: Madagascar; Mauritius; International Organization: East African Community | |
| Tanzania | Arusha | Consulate-General | | |
| Tanzania | Kigoma | Liaison Office | | |
| Uganda | Kampala | Embassy | | |
| Zambia | Lusaka | Embassy | Countries: Angola; Malawi; International Organizations: COMESA; Regional Center on Democracy, Good Governance, Human Rights and Civic Education | |

=== Americas ===
| Host country | Host city | Mission | Concurrent accreditation | Ref. |
|---|---|---|---|---|
| Canada | Ottawa | Embassy | | |
| United States | Washington, D.C. | Embassy | Countries: Brazil; El Salvador; International Organizations: IMF; The World Bank | |

=== Asia ===
| Host country | Host city | Mission | Concurrent accreditation | Ref. |
|---|---|---|---|---|
| China | Beijing | Embassy | Countries: Australia; Japan; Philippines; South Korea; Vietnam | |
| India | New Delhi | Embassy | Countries: Indonesia; Malaysia; Singapore; Thailand | |
| Qatar | Doha | Embassy | Countries: Jordan; Kuwait | |
| Saudi Arabia | Riyadh | Embassy | Countries: Bahrain; Oman | |
| Turkey | Ankara | Embassy | Countries: Iraq; Iran; Georgia; Romania | |
| United Arab Emirates | Dubai | Consulate-General | | |

=== Europe ===
| Host country | Host city | Mission | Concurrent accreditation | Ref. |
|---|---|---|---|---|
| Belgium | Brussels | Embassy | Countries: Luxembourg; International Organizations: European Union; Organisation of African, Caribbean and Pacific States | |
| France | Paris | Embassy | Countries: Monaco; Portugal; Spain; International Organizations: Francophonie; UNESCO | |
| Germany | Berlin | Embassy | Countries: Austria; Czech Republic; Denmark; Finland; Hungary; Iceland; Latvia; Norway; Sweden; Slovakia; International Organizations: CND; IAEA; UNIDO; UNODC; UNOOS | |
| Holy See | Rome | Embassy | | |
| Italy | Rome | Embassy | Countries: Armenia; Croatia; Cyprus; Greece; Moldova; Malta; North Macedonia; Serbia; Slovenia; International Organizations: IFAD; FAO; WFP | |
| Netherlands | The Hague | Embassy | Countries: Lithuania; International Organization: OPCW | |
| Russia | Moscow | Embassy | Countries: Kazakhstan; Belarus; Bulgaria; Poland; Uzbekistan | |
| United Kingdom | London | Embassy | Countries: Ireland | |

=== Multilateral organizations ===
| Organization | Host city | Host country | Mission | Concurrent accreditation | Ref. |
|---|---|---|---|---|---|
| United Nations | New York City | United States | Permanent Mission | Countries: Costa Rica; Dominican Republic; Fiji; Maldives | |
| United Nations | Geneva | Switzerland | Permanent Mission | Countries: Switzerland; Liechtenstein; International Organizations: IOM; WHO; UNCTAD; World Trade Organization | |

== Gallery ==
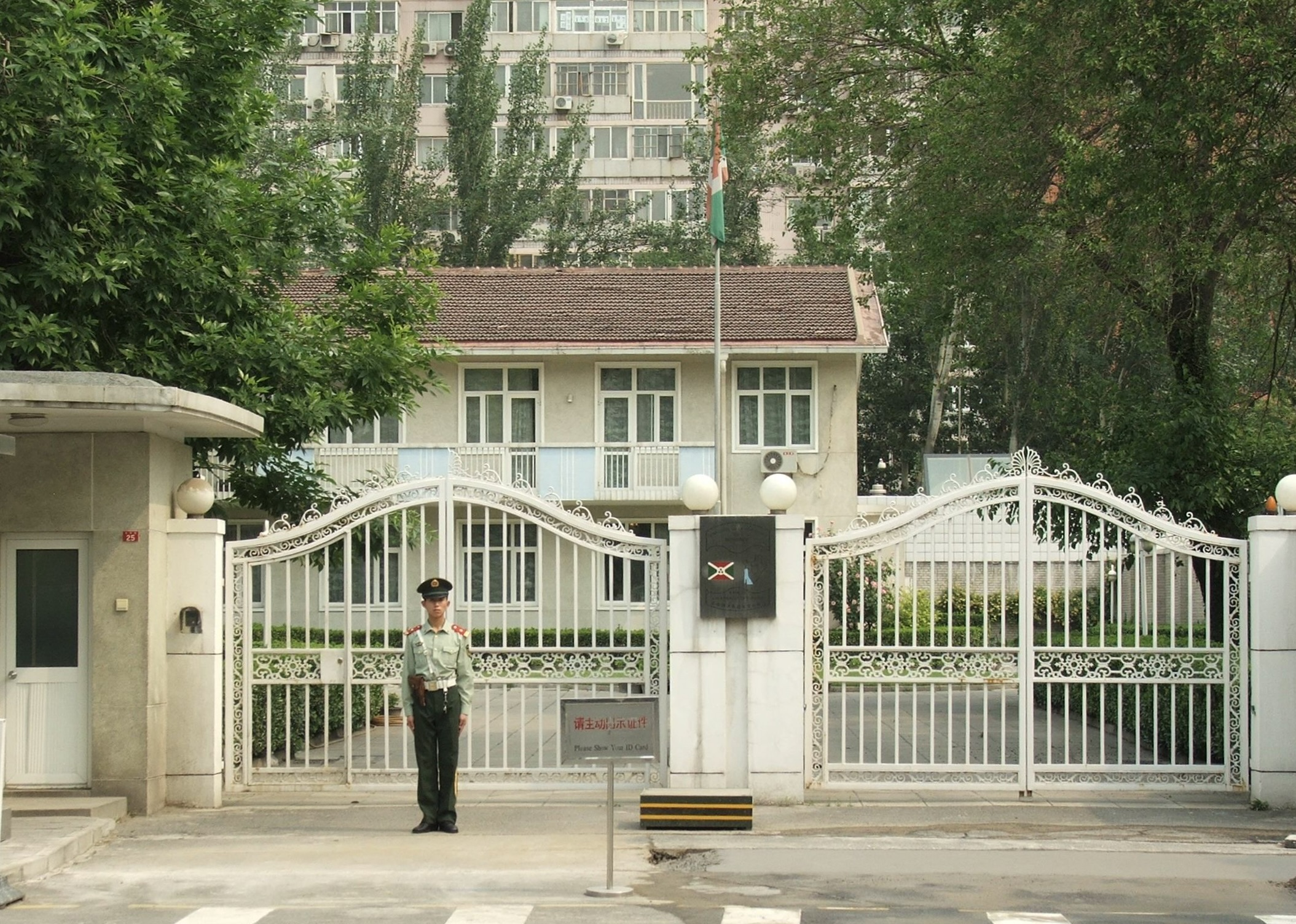
Embassy in Beijing

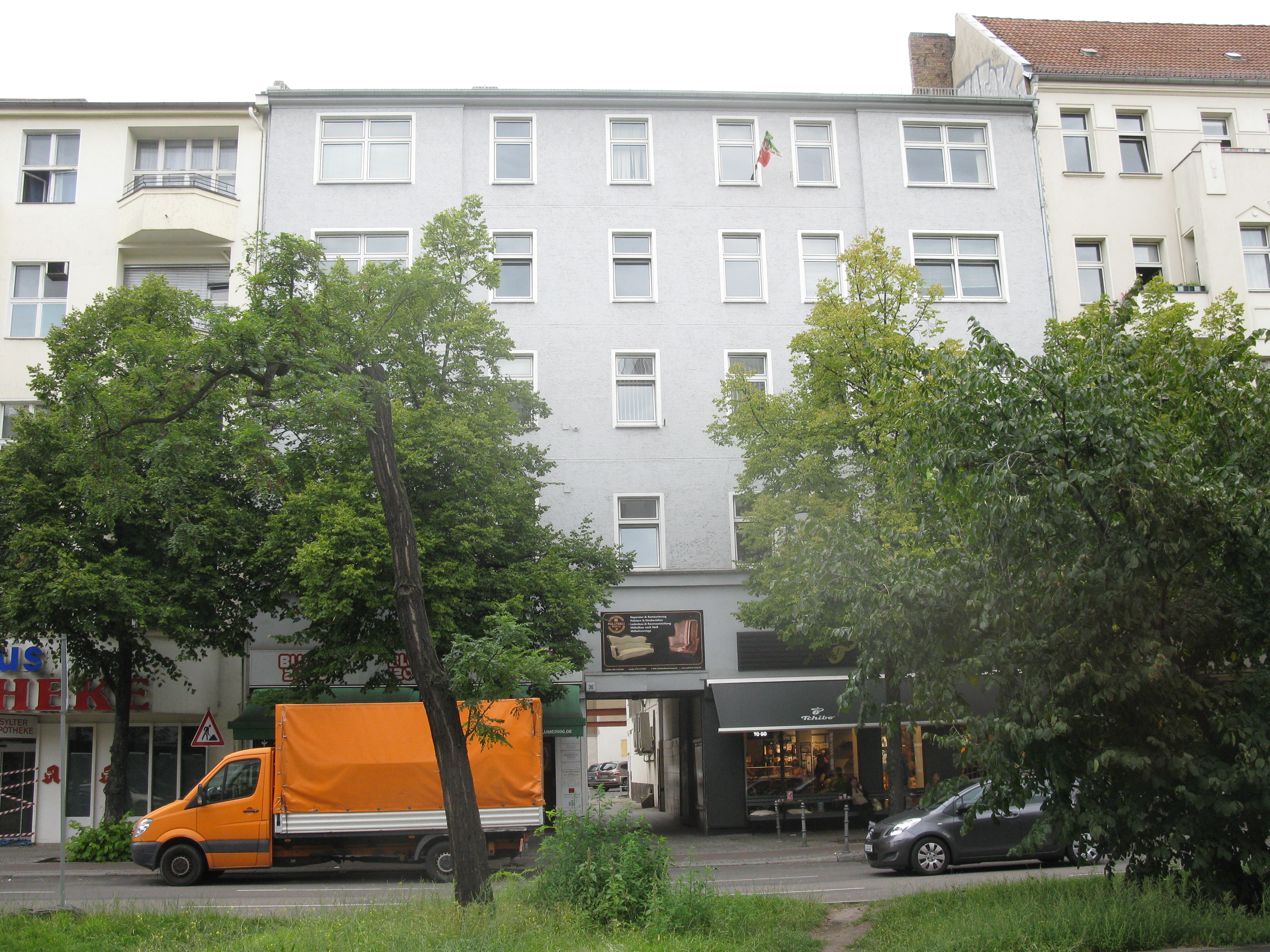
Embassy in Berlin

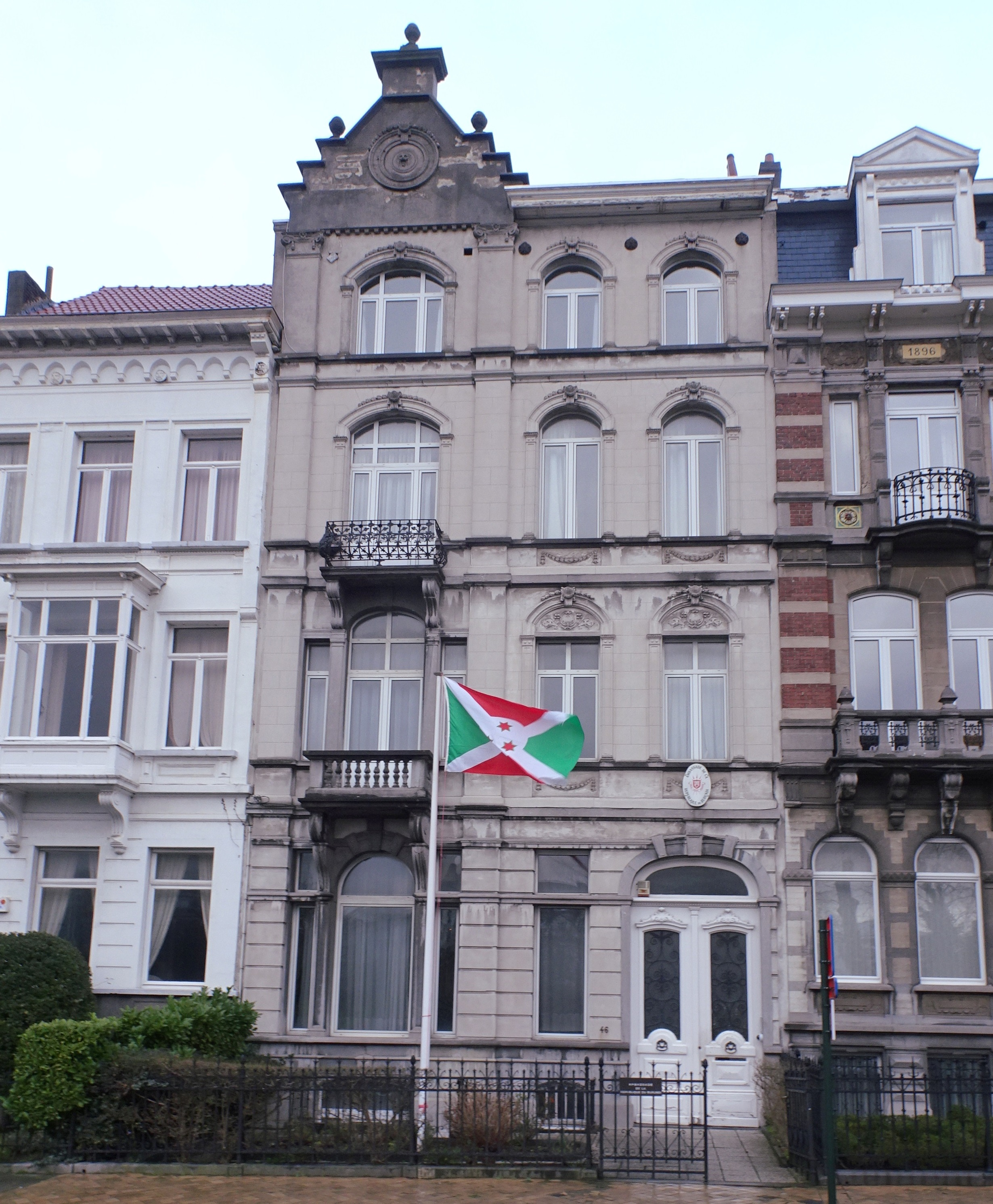
Embassy in Brussels

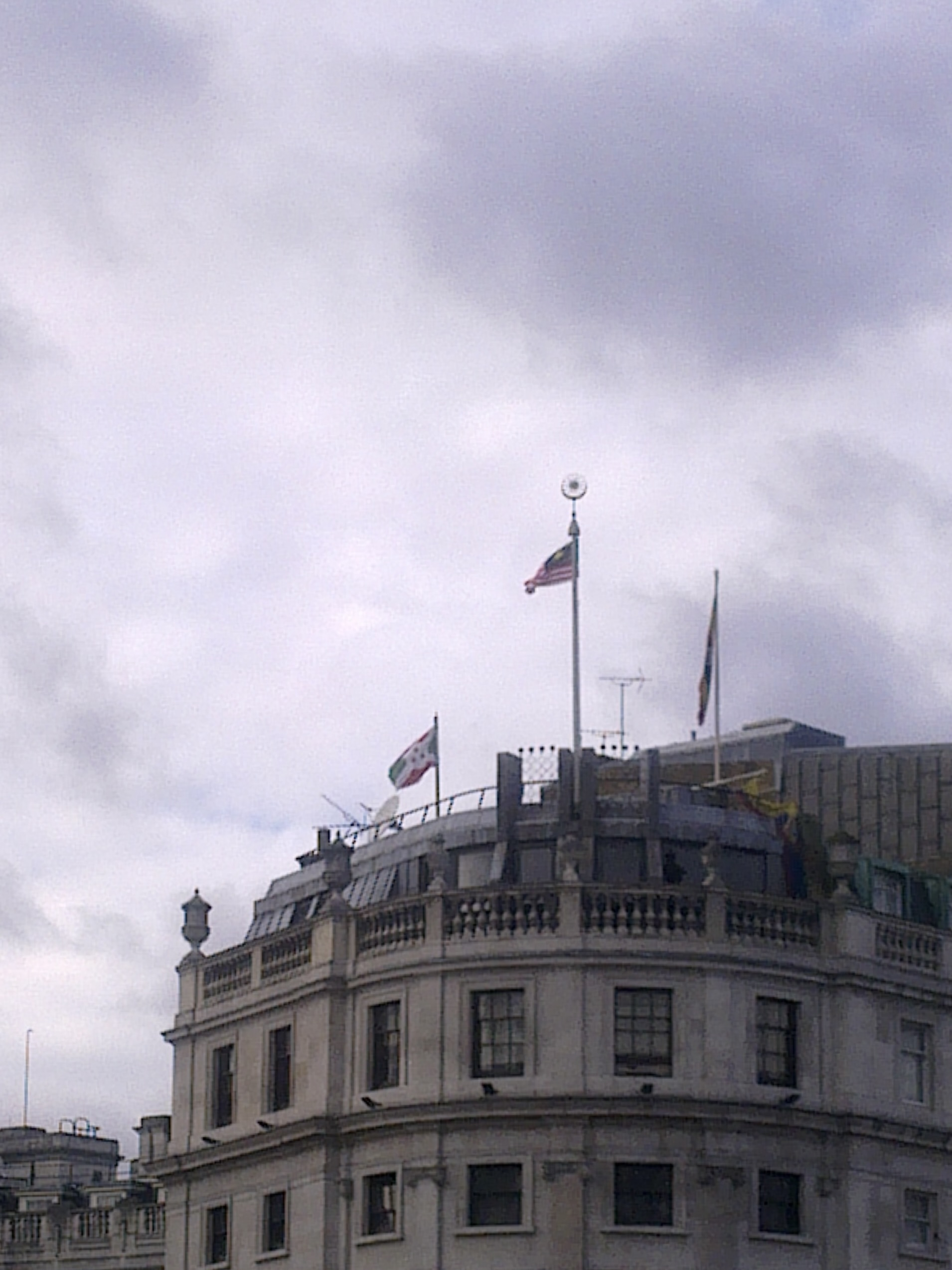
Embassy in London

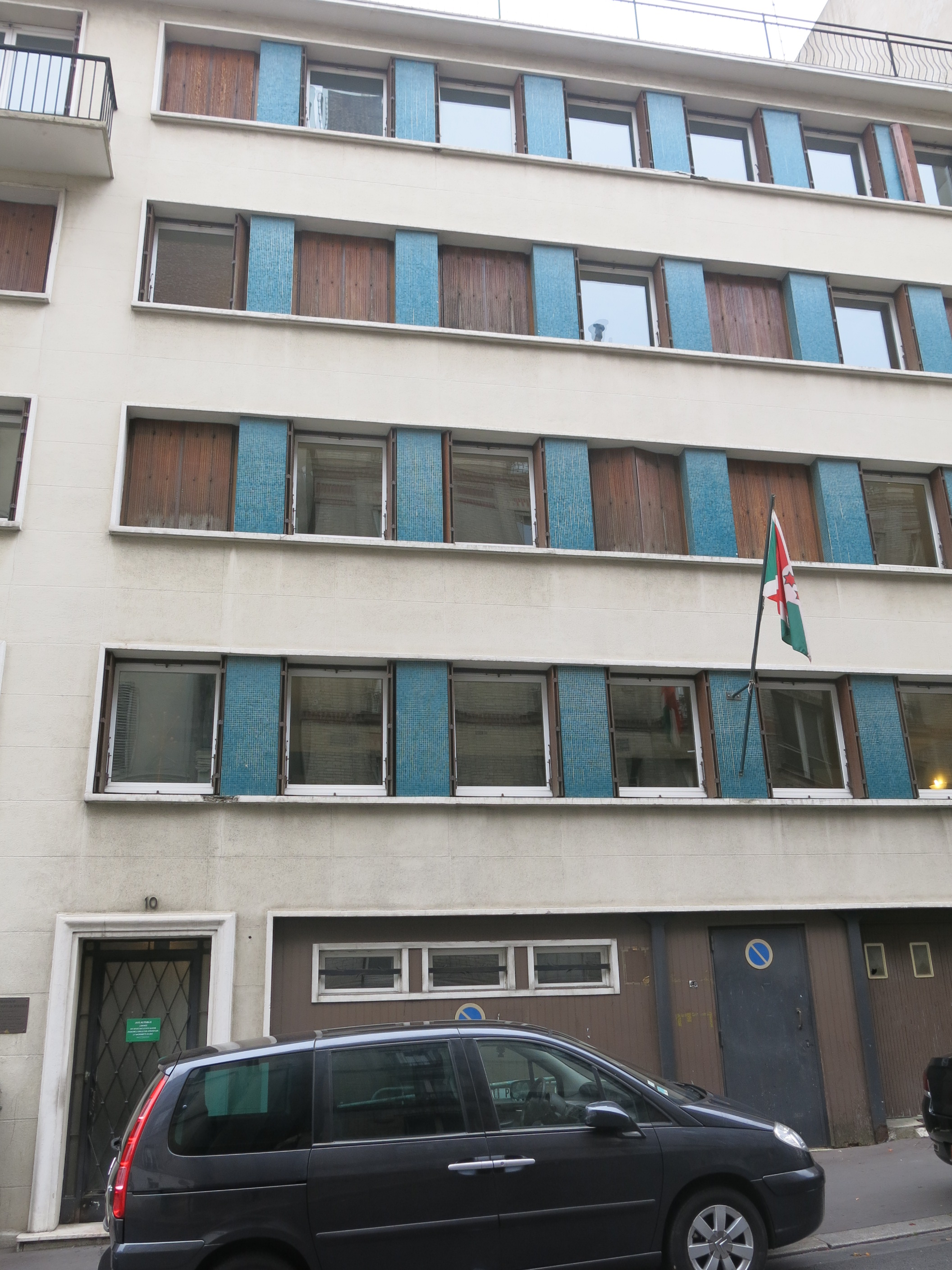
Embassy in Paris

== Closed missions ==
| Host country | Host city | Mission | Year closed | Ref. |
|---|---|---|---|---|
| Brazil | Brasília | Embassy (Note: Resident in Washington, D.C., United States) | 2020 | |
| Iran | Teheran | Embassy (Note: Resident in Ankara, Turkey) | 2018 | |
| Japan | Tokyo | Embassy (Note: Resident in Beijing, China) | 1997 | |
| Libya | Tripoli | Embassy (Note: Resident in Cairo, Egypt) | 2014 | |
| Norway | Oslo | Embassy (Note: Resident in Berlin, Germany) | 2018 | |
| Somalia | Mogadishu | Embassy (Note: Resident in Nairobi, Kenya) | Unknown | |

== Diplomatic missions to open ==
- Austria
- Cuba
- Kuwait

== Links to diplomatic missions websites ==
- Americas
  - Burundi embassy in New York
  - Burundi embassy in Ottawa
  - Burundi embassy in Washington DC
- Europe
  - Burundi embassy in Berlin
  - Burundi embassy in Brussels
  - Burundi embassy in Geneva
  - Burundi embassy in London
  - Burundi embassy in Moscow
  - Burundi embassy in Paris
  - Burundi embassy in Roma
  - Burundi embassy in The Hague
  - Burundi embassy in Vatican City
- Asia
  - Burundi embassy in Ankara
  - Burundi embassy in Beijing
  - Burundi embassy in Doha
  - Burundi embassy in New Delhi
  - Burundi embassy in Riyadh
  - Burundi consulate general in Dubai
- Africa
  - Burundi embassy in Abuja
  - Burundi embassy in Addis Ababa
  - Burundi embassy in Algiers
  - Burundi embassy in Cairo
  - Burundi embassy in Dar Es Salaam
  - Burundi embassy in Kampala
  - Burundi embassy in Kigali
  - Burundi embassy in Kinshasa
  - Burundi embassy in Lusaka
  - Burundi embassy in Nairobi
  - Burundi embassy in Pretoria
  - Burundi embassy in Rabat
  - Burundi consulate general in Bukavu
  - Burundi consulate general in Kigoma
  - Burundi consulate general in Laayoune
  - Burundi Liaison office in Arusha

== See also ==
- Foreign relations of Burundi
- List of diplomatic missions in Burundi
- Visa policy of Burundi
