= Burundi–North Korea relations =

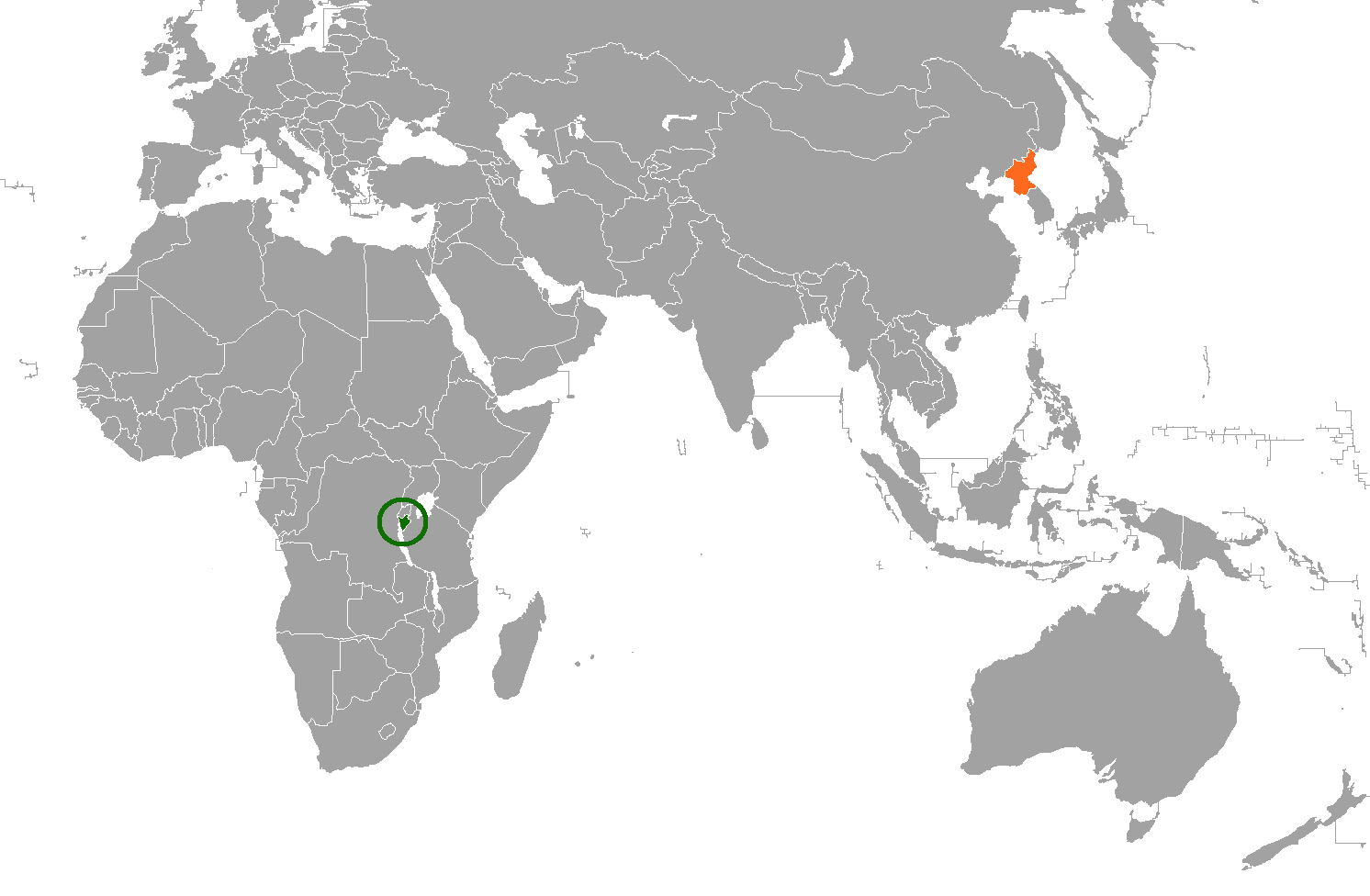

- Burundi: North Korea

Burundi–North Korea relations (Korean: 부룬디-조선민주주의인민공화국 관계) refers to the current and historical relationship between Burundi and North Korea. Neither country maintains an embassy in their respective capitals.

== History ==
Diplomatic relations between the two countries were established on 11 March 1967, a year after President Michel Micombero overthrew the previous monarchy. Micombero, a Tutsi African socialist aligned with China, initially maintained a close relationship with North Korea. It was eventually strained in 1971 by alleged undermining against his military rule carried out by North Koreans among the youth members of the Union for National Progress (UPRONA). For several months he refused to accept the credentials of the North Korean ambassador, and threatened to expel all North Korean citizens.

Despite this issue, North Korea aided Micombero's Tutsi regime during the Hutu uprising that broke out in 1972 the resulting genocidal violence and the deaths of 150,000 Hutus. Together with China and France, North Korea provided military support during the unrest. In the years after this, the relationship improved. In 1976, Micombero promised full support to the policies of Kim Il Sung. He was overthrown the same year.

In the late 1970s, North Korean engineers constructed a presidential palace for Micombero's successor, Jean-Baptiste Bagaza.

A later President, Pierre Buyoya, likewise aligned with North Korea on, among other things, expressing support for the country's plans to achieve Korean reunification. He is reported to have had possible North Korean military assistance during the Second Congo War.

In 2011, it was alleged that Burundi – by purchasing defective Chinese weapons from the North Koreans through a Ukrainian company – had broken the arms embargo placed on North Korea.

== See also ==
- Foreign relations of Burundi
- Foreign relations of North Korea
