= List of diplomatic missions in Burundi =

This is a list of diplomatic missions in Burundi. At present, the economic capital city of Bujumbura hosts 22 embassies and 4 other diplomatic representations.

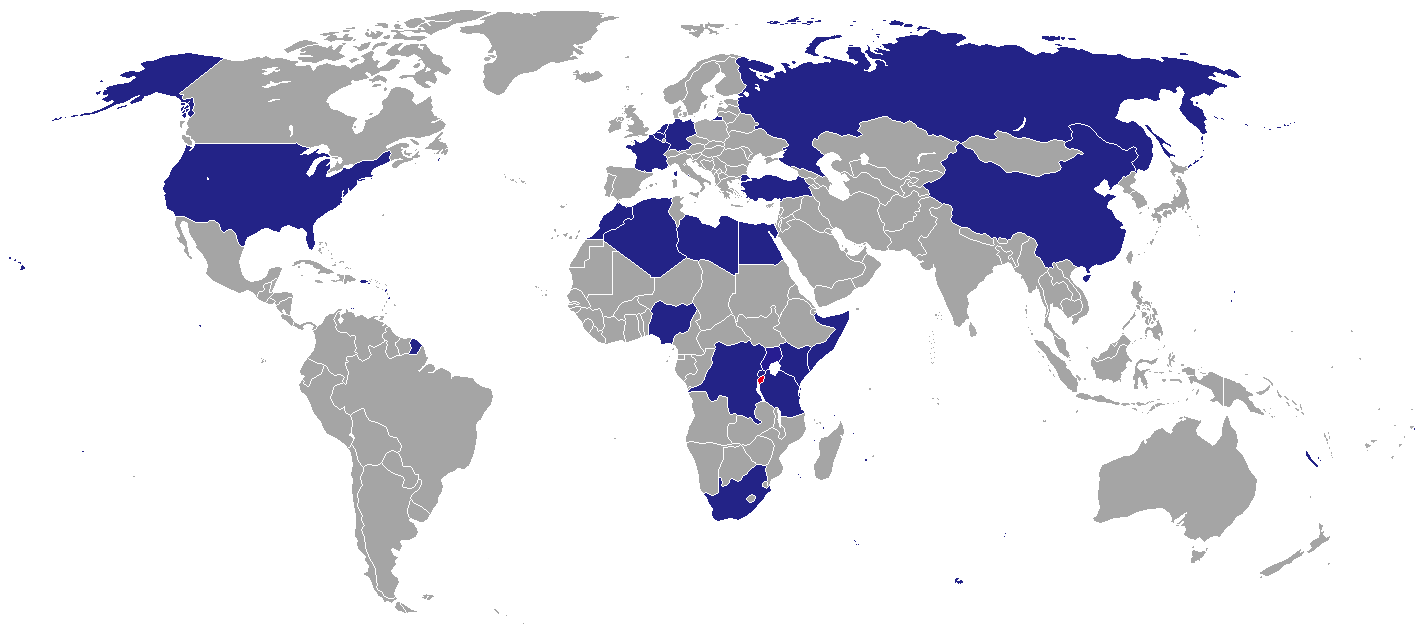
Diplomatic missions in Burundi: Burundi

== Embassies in Bujumbura ==
1. Algeria
2. Belgium
3. China
4. Congo-Kinshasa
5. Egypt
6. France
7. Germany
8. Holy See
9. Kenya
10. Libya
11. Morocco
12. Netherlands
13. Nigeria
14. Russia
15. Rwanda
16. South Africa
17. Sovereign Military Order of Malta
18. Somalia
19. Tanzania
20. Turkey
21. Uganda
22. United States

== Other representations in Bujumbura ==
1. European Union (Delegation)
2. African Union (High Representative & Special Representative of the Chairperson of the Commission for AULO Burundi/the Great Lakes Region)
3. Switzerland (Cooperation office & consular agency)
4. United Kingdom (Embassy office)

== Non-resident embassies accredited to Burundi ==
=== Resident in Addis Ababa, Ethiopia ===
1. Bangladesh
2. Djibouti
3. Georgia
4. Lesotho
5. Mauritania
6. Palestine

=== Resident in Dar es Salaam, Tanzania ===
1. Angola
2. Finland
3. Indonesia
4. Ireland
5. Malawi
6. Mozambique
7. Namibia
8. Oman
9. Qatar
10. Poland
11. Spain
12. Sweden
13. Switzerland
14. Vietnam

=== Resident in Kampala, Uganda ===
1. Cuba
2. Denmark
3. Ethiopia
4. Iran
5. Italy
6. North Korea
7. Norway
8. South Sudan
9. Sudan
10. United Arab Emirates
11. Venezuela

=== Resident in Kigali, Rwanda ===
1. Canada
2. Congo-Brazzaville
3. Israel
4. Japan
5. Pakistan
6. Senegal
7. South Korea
8. United Kingdom
9. Zimbabwe

=== Resident in Kinshasa, Congo-Kinshasa ===
1. Cameroon
2. Portugal
3. Gabon
4. Guinea

=== Resident in Nairobi, Kenya ===
1. Argentina
2. Australia
3. Austria
4. Botswana
5. Brazil
6. Burkina Faso
7. Colombia
8. Cyprus
9. Czech Republic
10. Ghana
11. Greece
12. Hungary
13. Kuwait
14. Mexico
15. Malaysia
16. Philippines
17. Romania
18. Serbia
19. Sierra Leone
20. Slovakia
21. Thailand
22. Tunisia
23. Ukraine

=== Resident in Pretoria, South Africa ===
1. Croatia
2. Madagascar
3. Nepal
4. Seychelles

=== Resident in other cities ===
1. Chad (Brazzaville)
2. Equatorial Guinea (Brazzaville)
3. Mali (Luanda)
4. Nicaragua (Harare)

== See also ==
- Foreign relations of Burundi
- List of diplomatic missions of Burundi
