= Burundi–Tanzania relations =

- Burundi: Tanzania

Burundi–Tanzania relations are bilateral relations between Burundi and Tanzania. Burundi is a strategic partner of Tanzania in many areas, particularly trade. Since Burundi is a landlocked country, almost 80% of its goods are moved through by road to Dar es Salaam Port. Tanzania has also been a strategic partner in mediating the political tensions in the country. Both countries are members of the African Union.

== Overview ==
=== Burundian Refugees ===
Burundi has been very politically alienated and unstable since its independence. There has been various ethnic clashes between the two major ethnic groups and the violence has forced many Burundians to take refuge in neighboring countries, mainly Tanzania. The Burundian civil war that lasted from 1993 to 2005 brought many refugees flooding into Tanzania and various accusations stained the relationship between the Tanzanian and the current Burundian government. The civil war was ended by mediation between the rivaling parties and the then Tanzanian foreign minister Jakaya Kikwete.

In 2015 the political crisis in Burundi with the election for the third term of Pierre Nkurunziza brought further civil unrest in the country. This again brought more refugees into Tanzania. Former president of Tanzania, Benjamin Mkapa was assigned to be the mediator by the East African Community. In September, 2019, 600 refugees returned to Burundi from Tanzania. This was the first batch of mass repatriation. Several weeks later, President John Magufuli said "refugees in Tanzania must go home" and warned that refugees in Tanzania cannot stay indefinitely and will not be granted citizenship.

== Trade and economy ==
On 1 July 2007, Burundi became a full member of the East African Community (EAC). Additionally, Burundi joined the EAC Customs Union on 6 July 2009. It has since then has been a strategic partner in terms of customs and trade integration.

Tanzania is Burundi's second-largest import partner after China and has a very imbalanced trade balance with Tanzania. in 2013 Burundi exported $1.69 million worth of goods to Tanzania and Tanzania exported $45.2 million worth. Tanzania exports various items to Burundi such as Building material, wheat, sugar and cheap manufactured products.

Most of Burundian goods or goods transiting through Burundi to Eastern DRC originate from Dar es Salaam Port. To help facilitate better trade Burundi and Tanzania signed a One-Stop Border post-agreement in 2011 and the status of the project is near completion. However, due to the Burundian unrest the border security has been tightened.

=== Business integration ===
There are various companies that operate cross border, mainly transport companies however there are two notable Tanzanian companies that operate in Burundi. Air Tanzania operated flights out of Bujumbura Airport to Kigoma and Dar es Salaam; however, suspended flights a number of times due to various reasons. CRDB Bank, one of Tanzania's largest bank began operations in Burundi in 2012 and has been operating since.

== Diplomatic relations ==
Burundi maintains an embassy in Dar es Salaam and a consulate in Kigoma.

Tanzania maintains an embassy in Bujumbura.

== State Visits ==
Various state visits are made between the leaders of the respective countries due to the membership in the East African Community.

- 20 March 2015: Jakaya Kikwete makes a state visit to Bujumbura before the Burundian presidential election, 2015, and hopes that the country has peaceful elections.

== See also ==
- Foreign relations of Burundi
- Foreign relations of Tanzania
