= Liaison Office =

Liaison Office is the name of some organization or de facto embassies, which may refer to:

- Liaison Office (Hong Kong), the representative office of China (PRC) government in Hong Kong
- Liaison Office (Macao), the representative office of China (PRC) government in Macao
- Taipei Liaison Office in South Africa, the representative office of ROC (Taiwan) government in South Africa
- Liaison Office of the Republic of South Africa in Taipei, the representative office of South Africa government in ROC (Taiwan)
- Inter-Korean Liaison Office, the joint representative office of North and South Korea government.
