= Burundi–Russia relations =

- Burundi: Russia

Diplomatic mission
- Embassy of Russia, Bujumbura: Embassy of Burundi, Moscow

Burundi–Russia relations are the bilateral relations between Burundi and Russia. Both countries established diplomatic relations on 1 October 1962. Russia has an embassy in Bujumbura while Burundi has an embassy in Moscow.

Relations between the two countries strengthened after Burundi's relations with the West deteriorated. In recent years, Russia and Burundi have maintained similar visions and collaboration in the international arena, including within the United Nations framework. Russia considers Burundi one of its trusted allies on the African continent.

== Relations with the Russian Federation ==
Since relations with the West deteriorated in 2015, Burundi has sided more often with Russia on the international stage. Notably, Burundi supported Russian involvement in the Syrian Arab Republic, to help President Bashar al-Assad.

== Relations since the Russian invasion of Ukraine ==
Burundi voted against United Nations General Assembly Resolution ES-11/3 which called for suspending Russia from the United Nations Human Rights Council.

Burundi's foreign minister insisted that his country would not take sides in Russia's war against Ukraine.

In May 2023, Russian Foreign Minister Sergei Lavrov announced that preparations for an inter-governmental agreement between Moscow and Burundi on civilian nuclear energy were in their final stage.
